= Susan Graham =

American mezzo-soprano

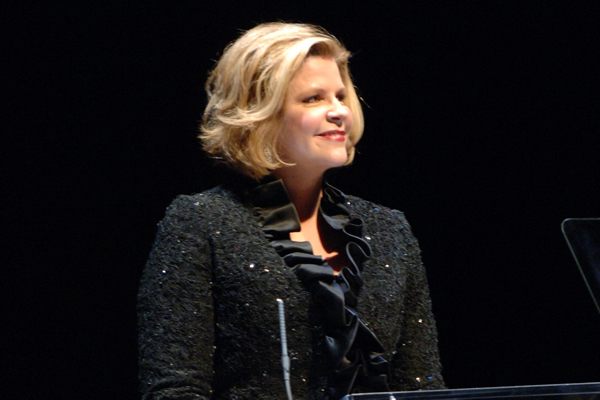
- Graham in 2008
- Born: July 23, 1960 (age 66); Roswell, New Mexico, US
- Education: Texas Tech University, Manhattan School of Music
- Occupation: Opera singer

Susan Graham (born July 23, 1960) is an American mezzo-soprano. She has had an international career in operas and concerts since her stage debut in 1985 at the Eugene Opera. In her early career she came to prominence on the international stage in several trouser roles; among them Annio in La clemenza di Tito, Cherubino in The Marriage of Figaro, The Composer in Ariadne auf Naxos, and Octavian in Der Rosenkavalier. She has premièred several roles in contemporary operas, including John Harbison's The Great Gatsby (Jordan Baker), Jake Heggie's Dead Man Walking (Sister Helen Prejean), and Tobias Picker's An American Tragedy (Sondra Finchley). Graham is a noted champion of the French song repertoire and of songs by contemporary American composers, including Ned Rorem and Lowell Liebermann. She has sung leading roles at the Metropolitan Opera, the Royal Opera House, La Scala, the Paris Opera, and the Vienna State Opera among other theaters. In 2004 she won the Grammy Award for Best Classical Vocal Performance.

== Early life and education ==
The daughter of Floyd "Pete" and Betty Rae Graham, Susan Graham was born in Roswell, New Mexico on July 23, 1960. She spent her early years living in Roswell where she attended elementary school and junior high school. Due to her father's work as a geophysicist, the family moved to various locations in West Texas before her family finally settled in Midland, Texas when she was thirteen years old. She has maintained strong family ties to eastern New Mexico, having relatives living in Roswell, Clovis, and Lovington.

Graham's initial training as a musician was as a pianist which she began studying when she was approximately 7 year old. She studied the piano for 13 years. She began singing in her church choir in Roswell at the age of 6. In Texas she was a member of Midland First United Methodist Church which she attended with fellow congregants George W. Bush and Laura Bush. When she first moved to Midland it was in the middle of her 8th grade year, and she became a student at Goddard Junior High School. She began taking voice lessons when she was in high school. She graduated from Midland Lee High School (MLHS). In her senior year she portrayed Maria Von Trapp in MLHS's production of The Sound of Music.

Graham attended Texas Tech University (TTU) where she graduated with a Bachelor of Music degree in 1983. Her voice teacher at the university was Mary Gillas. She continued graduate studies in vocal performance at TTU. She was a performer in multiple choirs at the university, and appeared in multiple student opera productions directed by John Gillas. She portrayed Hansel in TTU's 1984 production of Engelbert Humperdinck's Hansel and Gretel. She graduated with a master's degree from TTU in 1985, and then immediately pursued further voice studies at the Manhattan School of Music (MSM) in New York with Marlena Malas.

In 1986 Graham performed in MSM's production of Hans Werner Henze's The English Cat which was directed by Lou Galterio. The following year she portrayed the title role in MSM's production of Jules Massenet's Chérubin in that opera's first performance in the United States. In her second year at MSM, she successfully auditioned for the Merola Opera Program; a summer training program for young opera singers operated by the San Francisco Opera. The 1987 summer Merola program ended with a capstone vocal competition in which Graham won the top honor, the Schwabacher Memorial Award, which included a cash prize of four thousand dollars. In 1988 she was one of the winners of the Metropolitan Opera National Council Auditions. In 1990 the Richard Tucker Music Foundation awarded her a career grant.

== Career ==
=== 1980s ===
While still a university student, Graham made her professional opera debut in Oregon in December 1985 in the trouser role of Hansel in Humperdinck's Hansel and Gretel with Eugene Opera at the Hult Center for the Performing Arts. Trouser roles would become a specialty of hers in her early career. In the summer of 1988 she portrayed Erika in Samuel Barber's Vanessa at the Opera Theatre of Saint Louis (OTSL). The following October she appeared as Stéphano, another breeches role, in Gounod's Roméo et Juliette at the Seattle Opera. In December 1988 she made her professional concert debut at Alice Tully Hall with the New York Chamber Ensemble singing Gustav Mahler's Des Knaben Wunderhorn.

In 1989 Graham returned to Missouri as Charlotte in OTSL's production of Massenet's Werther, and was a soloist in Mozart's Requiem with the Bach Society of St. Louis. That same year she portrayed both Flora in La traviata and Annina in Der Rosenkavalier at the Santa Fe Opera, and gave her first performance with the Lyric Opera of Chicago in the pants role of Annio in La clemenza di Tito. In February 1989 she sang the world premiere of Rhian Samuel's "Before Dawn" with the National Orchestral Association. In December 1989 she was one of the soloists in the world premiere of Bright Sheng's orchestrated version of Leonard Bernstein's Arias and Barcarolles which was given at the 92nd Street Y with the New York Chamber Symphony under Gerard Schwarz.

=== 1990s ===
In 1990 Graham made her international debut at the Opéra de Lyon as a replacement for Anne Sofie von Otter as Béatrice in Berlioz's Béatrice et Bénédict; a role which she recorded for her first complete opera recording soon after. In March 1990 she sang Octavian in Der Rosenkavalier for the first time in a concert version of the opera with the Richmond Symphony Orchestra and Ellen Shade as the Marschallin. One of her signature parts, she later sang Octavian in either staged or concert versions with the San Francisco Symphony (1991), the Minnesota Orchestra (1992), the Welsh National Opera (1994), the Teatro Regio in Turin, the Vienna State Opera, and the Paris Opera.

In October 1990 Graham returned to Seattle Opera as the Kitchen Boy in Rusalka. In November 1990 she made her debut at the San Francisco Opera as Minerva in Il ritorno d'Ulisse in patria. That same year she appeared with the Washington National Opera as Sonia in Dominick Argento's The Aspern Papers, and returned to Santa Fe as both Dorabella in Mozart's Così fan tutte and in the trouser role of The Composer in Richard Strauss's Ariadne auf Naxos.

In September 1991 Graham made her debut at the Metropolitan Opera ("the Met") as the Second Lady in The Magic Flute with Ruth Welting as the Queen of the Night, Jerry Hadley as Tamino, Dawn Upshaw as Pamina, and James Levine conducting. That same year she appeared as a soloist with the New York Philharmonic led by Robert Shaw in performances of Barber's Prayers of Kierkegaard and Mozart's Great Mass in C minor, K. 427. She performed the trouser role of Cherubino in The Marriage of Figaro at the Santa Fe Opera in 1991, and later sang Cherubino at the Met in 1992 as a replacement for Frederica von Stade whose husband was having surgery. In February 1992 she portrayed Rosina in The Barber of Seville with the Edmonton Opera in Canada.

Graham's other early Met roles included Tebaldo in Verdi's Don Carlo (1992), Meg Page in Verdi's Falstaff (1992, with Paul Plishka in the title role), and Ascanius in Berlioz's Les Troyens (1993-1994). She sang Octavian at the Met in 1995 for her first major part at that opera house. She had a major success at the Salzburg Festival in 1993 in the breeches role of Cecilio in Mozart's Lucio Silla. She gave her first performances at the Royal Opera House (ROH), Covent Garden the following year as Massenet's Chérubin; a role she repeated at that theatre in 1997. She sang Mozart's Cherubino again at the Glyndebourne Festival Opera (1995), the Salzburg Festival (1995), the Lyric Opera of Chicago (1997), Vienna State Opera (1997-1998), and the Metropolitan Opera (1997 & 1999).

In 1994 Graham returned to Opéra de Lyon as Marguerite in Berlioz La damnation de Faust; a production which was recorded by Erato Records and released on disc by that label in 1995. Around this time she sang Berlioz's Marguerite again for her debut at La Scala. She repeated the role of Berlioz's Beatrice with the Opéra Français de New York (1997) and at the Santa Fe Opera (1998). She repeated the role of The Composer in Ariadne auf Naxos at the Vienna State Opera (1997).

Graham reprised the role of Mozart's Dorabella at the ROH (1995), the Glyndebourne Festival Opera (1996), and the Met (1997). The latter production was filmed for television broadcast on the PBS program Live from the Metropolitan Opera. In 1995 she sang three concerts with the Sydney Symphony under conductor Edo de Waart which included a performance of Berlioz's song cycle Les Nuits d'été. That same year she portrayed the title role in the world premiere of Alexander Goehr's Arianna at the ROH. She has also sung Les Nuits d'été with the New York Philharmonic (1997), the Orchestra of St. Luke's (2002, Carnegie Hall), Palm Beach Opera (2006), the San Francisco Symphony (2007), and the Chicago Symphony Orchestra (2008).

In February 1997 Graham gave her New York recital debut at Alice Tully Hall. In January 1999 she returned to the Met as Massenet's Charlotte with Thomas Hampson as Werther in the composer's revised version of the opera which reset the title role for a baritone rather than tenor. Later that year she performed the role of Ruggerio in Handel's Alcina which was co-produced by the Paris National Opera and Les Arts Florissants. It featured Renée Fleming in the title role, Natalie Dessay as Morgana, and William Christie conducting. On December 20, 1999 she created the role of Jordan Baker in the world premiere of John Harbison's opera The Great Gatsby (after the novel by Fitzgerald) at the Met.

=== 2000s ===
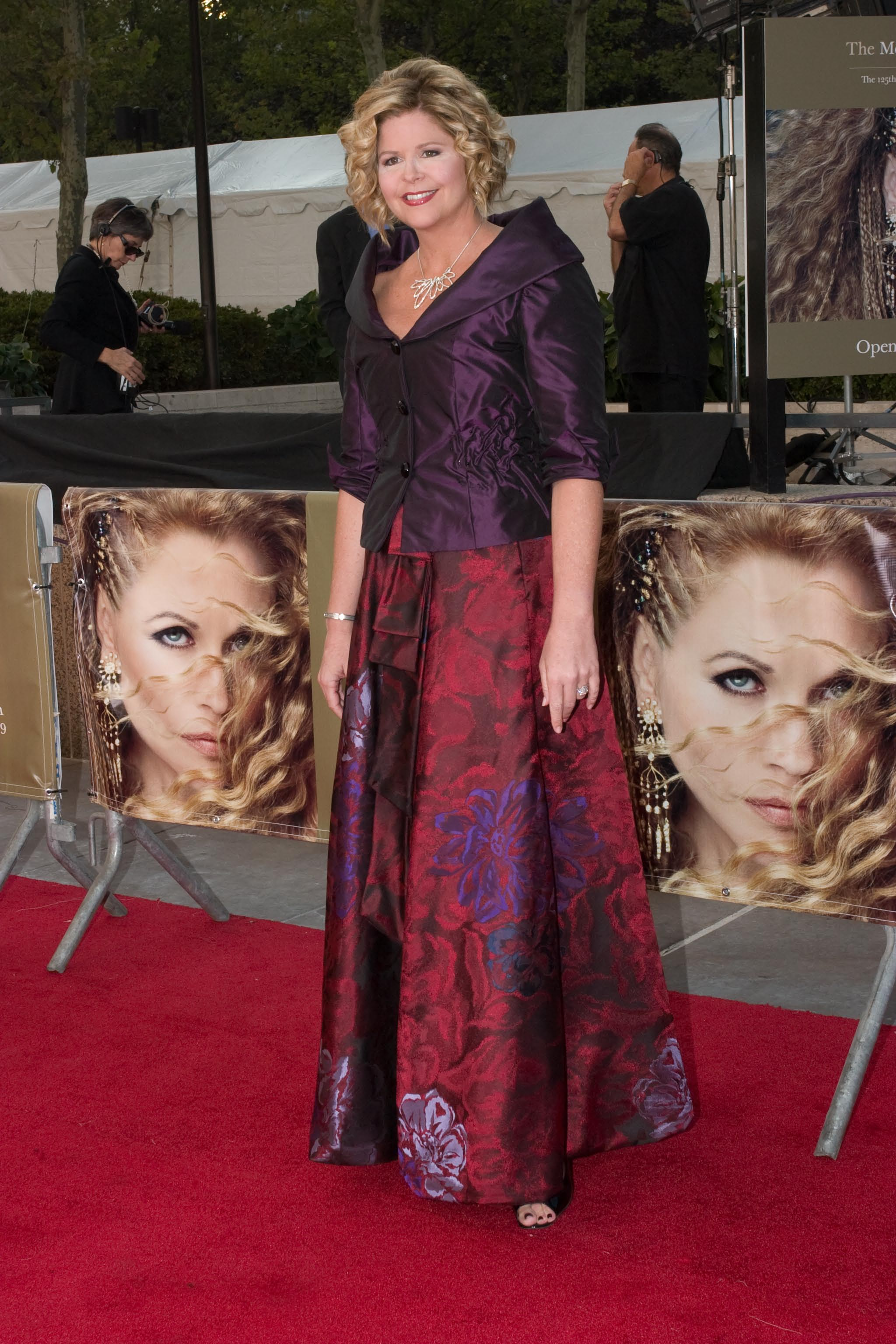
Graham at the Metropolitan Opera opening in 2008

In the summer of 2000 Graham returned to the Salzburg Festival to portray the title role in Iphigénie en Tauride. In October 2000 she portrayed Sister Helen Prejean in the world premiere of Jake Heggie's Dead Man Walking at the San Francisco Opera. She returned to the Met as Strauss' Octavian in 2000, 2005, and 2009. She also sang Octavian at the Royal Opera House (2000), the San Francisco Opera (2000), the Lyric Opera of Chicago (2006), and the Boston Symphony Orchestra (2016).

In 2001 Graham sang Idamante in Mozart's Idomeneo at the Met with Plácido Domingo in the title role. She later sang Idamante at the Palais Garnier (2002) and the Houston Grand Opera (HGO, 2005). She had earlier made her debut at the HGO in the title role of Handel's Ariodante in 2002. She returned to HGO the following year in the title role (aka Hanna Glawari) of The Merry Widow; a role she also performed at the Met in 2003-2004.

In 2003 Graham sang Erika to Christine Brewer's Vanessa in the English National Opera staging of Barber's opera at the Barbican Centre, and gave her first performance as Didon in Berlioz's Les Troyens at the Théâtre du Châtelet in Paris. She made her Carnegie Hall recital debut in April 2003, and a recording of this recital was later released. She sang "Bless This House" at George W. Bush's second inauguration on January 20, 2005, and Schubert's "Ave Maria" at the nationally televised funeral mass for Senator Edward M. Kennedy of Massachusetts on August 29, 2009. She is a US delegate for UNESCO.

In 2005 Graham created the role of Sondra Finchley in the world premiere of Tobias Picker's An American Tragedy at the Met. She repeated the role of The Composer in Ariadne auf Naxos at the Royal Opera House (2004), Glyndebourne Festival Opera (2004) and the Met (2005). She sang the role of Donna Elvira in Mozart's Don Giovanni for the first time at the Lyric Opera of Chicago in 2004. In 2005 she returned to the part of Mozart's Cecilio for performances at the Santa Fe Opera; and portrayed Sesto in Mozart's La clemenza di Tito with the Zurich Opera on tour to Royal Festival Hall. She also sang Sesto at the Palais Garnier in the summer of 2005 in a production that was filmed and released on DVD, and at the Met in 2008.

In 2006 Graham gave her first performance in the title role of Monteverdi's L'incoronazione di Poppea at the Houston Grand Opera. In 2007 she returned to the Met in the title role of Iphigénie en Tauride, and gave a recital at Jordan Hall in Boston. In 2008 Graham returned to the Met as Berlioz's Marguerite, and reprised the role of Ariodante with Ruth Ann Swenson as Ginerva at the San Francisco Opera. In 2009 she sang the role of Dido in Dido and Aeneas with the Philharmonia Baroque Orchestra.

=== 2010s ===
In 2010 Graham portrayed the title role in Handel's Xerxes for the first time at the HGO. She repeated this role the following year at the San Francisco Opera. Graham reprised the role of Berlioz's Didon at the Met (2012) and San Francisco Opera (2015). In 2012 she gave a recital at Carnegie Hall (CH) with pianist Malcolm Martineau. She returned to CH in January 2013 to give a joint recital of French chanson and opera excerpts with soprano Renée Fleming. In summer of 2013 she returned to Santa Fe Opera as Tina in The Aspern Papers and in the title role of Offenbach's La Grande-Duchesse de Gérolstein. In 2014 she portrayed Anna Leonowens in Rodgers and Hammerstein's The King and I at the Théâtre du Châtelet.

In 2015 Graham returned to the Met as Prince Orlofsky in Die Fledermaus , and portrayed the lesbian character of Countess Geschwitz in Alban Berg's Lulu; the latter with Marlis Petersen in the title role. That same year she sang Berlioz's Didon at the San Francisco Opera. In 2016 she sang an all-Handel program with the Los Angeles Philharmonic at the Hollywood Bowl, and reprised the role of Berlioz's Didon at the Lyric Opera of Chicago. In 2017 she repeated the role of Prince Orlofsky at the Santa Fe Opera; opened the Philadelphia Orchestra's Paris Festival with a concert of French folk songs led by conductor Yannick Nézet-Séguin; returned to the Met as Lehar's Hanna Glawari with Paul Groves as Count Danilo; and sang Mahler's Des Knaben Wunderhorn in a concert with Esa-Pekka Salonen and the Metropolitan Opera Orchestra at Carnegie Hall.

In 2018 Graham portrayed the title role in Marc Blitzstein's Regina at the Opera Theater of St. Louis, and performed the role of the Witch in Hansel and Gretel at the Los Angeles Opera. That same year she was a soloist in Mahler's Symphony No. 3 at the BBC Proms with conductor Andris Nelsons. In 2019 she portrayed Mrs. Patrick De Rocher in Dead Man Walking at the Lyric Opera of Chicago with Patricia Racette as Sister Helen. That same year she performed Ernest Chausson's Poème de l'amour et de la mer with the Naples Philharmonic, and gave a recital at the Segerstrom Center for the Arts which included Robert Schuman's song cycle Frauen-Liebe und Leben.

=== 2020s ===
Graham returned to Alice Tully Hall for another recital in February 2020. In the midst of the Covid-19 pandemic she starred as Madeline Mitchell in Opera San José's December 2020 production of Jake Heggie's Three Decembers. Rather than performing before a live audience, the opera was filmed for broadcast via online streaming. In October 2021 she performed the world premiere of Richard Danielpour and Rita Dove's song cycle A Standing Witness at the University of Chicago's Mandel Hall; a work created for her which she subsequently performed at Carnegie Hall in 2025.

In 2022 Graham sang the title role in The Merry Widow in a concert version of the opera with the Dallas Symphony Orchestra, and was the alto soloist in Bach's St Matthew Passion in a staged co-production of the oratorio by the Los Angeles Opera and the Hamburg Ballet. She reprised the role of Mrs. Patrick De Rocher at the Met with Joyce DiDonato as Sister Helen in 2023, and at the San Francisco Opera with Jamie Barton as Sister Helen in 2025. In August 2023 she returned to the Santa Fe Opera as Geneviève in Debussy's Pelléas et Mélisande; a role she had performed earlier that year at the Los Angeles Opera with James Conlon.

In March 2024 Graham starred in John Cage's chamber operas Europa 3 & 4 at the Detroit Opera. In the summer of 2024 she portrayed Madame Armfeldt in a concert version of Stephen Sondheim's A Little Night Music at David Geffen Hall with the Orchestra of St. Luke's and Cynthia Erivo as Petra. The following September she performed in the Boston Symphony Orchestra's (BSO) gala concert opening its 2024-2025 season which also celebrated conductor Andris Nelsons's 10th anniversary leading the ensemble. In early 2025 she performed the role of the Old Baroness in Barber's Vanessa with the National Symphony Orchestra led by Gianandrea Noseda at the Kennedy Center; a performance which was recorded and released on disc in 2026.

In October 2025 Graham portrayed the Marquise of Berkenfield in La Fille du Régiment at the Met with Sandra Oh as the Duchess of Crakentorp. In January 2026 she returned to the Paris Opera as Larina in Ralph Fiennes's staging of Eugene Onegin with Boris Pinkhasovich in the title role. In June 2026 she returned to Carnegie Hall to perform in the Carlisle Floyd Centennial concert led by Christopher James Ray. In August 2026 she performed the role of Marcellina in Mozart's The Marriage of Figaro with the BSO at the Tanglewood Music Festival, and returned to the Ravinia Festival to perform a concert with Frederica von Stade.

== Personal life ==
Graham married lighting designer Clay Brakeley in Santa Fe, New Mexico on September 17, 2016. The couple were friends from their days as students at Texas Tech University (TTU); having met at TTU in 1983.

== Awards ==
- 2001 Chevalier of the Order of Arts and Letters (Chevalier dans l'Ordre des Arts et des Lettres)
- June 2005 Commander of the Order of Arts and Letters
- Musical America 2004 Vocalist of the Year
- 2004 Grammy Award for Best Classical Vocal Performance, for her album Ives: Songs (The Things Our Fathers Loved; The Housatonic At Stockbridge, Etc.)
- 2005 Opera News Award
- September 5, 2006 Midland, Texas first annual "Susan Graham Day"
- May 2008, Honorary Doctorate, Manhattan School of Music

== Recordings ==
=== Complete opera recordings ===
Title	Year	Conductor and Orchestra	Cast	Label	Notes	References
Berlioz; Béatrice et Bénédict	1992	John Nelson; Lyon Opera Orchestra and Chorus	Susan Graham (Béatrice), Jean-Luc Viala (Bénédict), Sylvia McNair (Héro), Gilles Cachemaille (Claudio), Catherine Robbin (Ursule), Gabriel Bacquier (Somarone), Philippe Magnant (Léonato), Vincent le Texier (Don Pedro)	Erato Records / MusiFrance (CD)	Record made following the 1990 production at the Opéra de Lyon.	
Charles Gounod; Roméo et Juliette	1996	Leonard Slatkin; Munich Radio Orchestra	Plácido Domingo (Roméo), Ruth Ann Swenson (Juliette), Alastair Miles (Frere Laurent), Kurt Ollmann (Mercutio), Susan Graham (Stephano), Sarah Walker (Gertrude), Alain Vernhes (Capulet), Paul Charles Clarke (Tybalt), Toby Spence (Benvolio), Christopher Maltman (Paris), Eric Freulon (Gregorio)	RCA Victor Red Seal (CD)		
Handel; Alcina	2000	William Christie; Les Arts Florissants	Renée Fleming (Alcina), Susan Graham (Ruggiero), Natalie Dessay (Morgana), Kathleen Kuhlmann (Bradamante), Timothy Robinson (Oronte), Laurent Naouri (Melisso), Juanita Lascarro (Oberto)	Erato Records (CD)	Recorded live at the Paris Opera in 1999.	
Heggie; Dead Man Walking	2001	Patrick Summers; San Francisco Opera Orchestra & Chorus	Susan Graham (Sister Helen Prejean); John Packard (Joseph De Rocher); Catherine Cook (Jade Boucher); Robert Orth (Owen Hart); Frederica von Stade (Mrs. Patrick De Rocher); Nicolle Foland (Kitty Hart)	Erato Records (CD)	Recording of the opera's premiere cast.	
Purcell; Dido and Aeneas	2003	Emmanuelle Haïm; Le Concert d'Astrée	Susan Graham (Dido); Ian Bostridge (Aeneas); Camilla Tilling (Belinda); Felicity Palmer (Sorceress); David Daniels (Spirit); Cécile de Boever (Second Woman); Paul Agnew (A Sailor)	Virgin Veritas (CD)	Recorded live at the Arsenal de Metz in March 2003.	
Barber; Vanessa	2004	Leonard Slatkin (orchestra conductor), Anthony Legge (choir conductor); BBC Symphony Orchestra & BBC Singers	Christine Brewer (Vanessa); Susan Graham (Erika); William Burden (Anatol); Neal Davies (The Old Doctor); Catherine Wyn-Rogers (Old Baroness); Simon Birchall (Nicholas); Stephen Charlesworth (Footman)	Chandos Records (CD)	Recorded live in November 2003. Released October 2004.	
Berlioz; Les Troyens	2004	John Eliot Gardiner; Orchestre Révolutionnaire et Romantique; Monteverdi Choir; Chœur du Théâtre du Châtelet	Susan Graham (Didon); Gregory Kunde (Énée); Laurent Naouri (Narbal); Lydia Korniordou (Andromaque); Mark Padmore (Iopas); Topi Lehtipuu (Hylas/Hélénus); Fernand Bernardi (Ghost of Hector); Danielle Bouthillon (Hécube); Nicolas Courjal (Trojan Guard); Benjamin Davies (Trojan soldier); Frances Jellard (Polyxène); Anna Caterina Antonacci (Cassandre); Ludovic Tézier (Chorèbe); Renata Pokupić (Anna); Quentin Gac (Astyanax); Stéphanie d'Oustrac (Ascagne); Nicolas Testé (Panthée); René Schirrer (Priam); Laurent Alvaro (Trojan Guard); Robert Davies (Greek Captain); Simon Davies (Priest of Pluto)	Opus Arte (DVD)	Live performances recorded in October 2003 at the Théâtre du Châtelet.	
Mozart; La clemenza di Tito	2005	Sylvain Cambreling; Paris National Opera Chorus and Orchestra	Christoph Prégardien (Tito); Susan Graham (Sesto); Catherine Naglestad (Vitellia); Ekaterina Siurina (Servillia); Hannah Esther Minutillo (Annio); Roland Bracht (Publio)	Opus Arte (DVD)		
Massenet; Werther	2006	Michel Plasson; Orchestre national du Capitole de Toulouse	Thomas Hampson (Werther); Susan Graham (Charlotte)); Sandrine Piau (Sophie); Stéphane Degout (Albert)	Virgin Classics (DVD)	Filmed live in 2004 at the Théâtre du Châtelet. The opera is presented in a concert version.	

=== Live concert recordings ===
Title	Year	Label	Notes	References
Schumann: Scenes from Goethe's Faust	1995	Sony Records (CD)	Scenes from Goethe's Faust by Robert Schumann. Recorded live in 1994. Performers include Bryn Terfel, Karita Mattila, Jan-Hendrik Rootering, Barbara Bonney, Endrik Wottrich, Iris Vermillion, Brigitte Poschner-Klebel, Susan Graham, Hans Peter Blochwitz, Harry Peeters, Berliner Philharmoniker, and Claudio Abbado (conductor).	
Gold & Silver Celebrations	1996	BBC2/EMI (Television)/(CD)	Recorded live at the Royal Opera House (ROH) on December 12, 1996 to mark the ROH's 50th anniversary and the 25th anniversary of Plácido Domingo's appearance at that theatre. Graham is one of several singers to perform in a night led by Domingo and conductor Edward Downes. This event was filmed for British television and aired live on the date of the event. A CD was later released.	
Susan Graham at Carnegie Hall	2003	Erato Records (CD)	Recorded live at Carnegie Hall with pianist Malcolm Martineau.	
Susan Graham – French Songs	2010	Ideale Audience Internationa (DVD)	Recorded live at the 2009 Verbier Festival.	

=== Studio albums ===
Title	Year	Label	Notes	References
Stravinsky: Pulcinella	1992	Delos Records (CD)	Graham is a soloist in Stravinsky's ballet Pulcinella with the Seattle Symphony Orchestra and conductor Gerard Schwarz	
Berlioz: Les nuits d'été, Op. 7 & Opera Arias	1997	Sony Classical (CD)	Graham is joined by conductor John Nelson and the orchestra of the Royal Opera House in performances of the song cycle Les nuits d'été by Berlioz and various opera arias.	
La Belle Époque – The Songs of Reynaldo Hahn	1998	Sony Classical (CD)	Graham and pianist Roger Vignoles perform art songs by Reynaldo Hahn.	
Ravel: Shéhérazade - Debussy: La damoiselle elue - Britten: Les illuminations	1998	Philips Records (CD)	Soprano Sylvia McNair is the principal singer on this album in all three works. Graham joins McNair and the Boston Symphony Orchestra led by Seiji Ozawa as a soloist in Debussy's La Damoiselle élue.	
La Belle Époque – The Songs of Reynaldo Hahn	1998	Sony Records (CD)	Album of Graham singing French-language art songs by composer Reynaldo Hahn. Roger Vignoles serves as her accompanist. Winner of Performance Today "Critic's Choice" Award; the 1999 Caecilia Prize; Preis der Deutschen Schallplattenkritik critic's award; Choc du Monde de la Musique; Opera International's Timbre de Platine.	
Strauss Heroines	1999	Decca Records (CD)	Graham is joined by Renée Fleming and Barbara Bonney in performances of excerpts from acts 1 and 3 of Der Rosenkavalier and act 1 of Arabella with conductor Christoph Eschenbach leading the Vienna Philharmonic. Graham is heard in the part of Octavian.	
Songs of Ned Rorem	2000	Erato Records (CD)	Graham sings art songs by Ned Rorem with pianist Malcolm Martineau.	
Berlioz: L'enfance du Christ; Three Irlande songs; Sara la baigneuse	2000	Decca Records (CD)	Graham sings the role of the Virgin Mary in Berlioz's Christmas oratorio L'Enfance du Christ. Charles Dutoit conducts the Orchestre Symphonique de Montreal. Other singers include John Mark Ainsley, François Le Roux, and Andrew Wentzel.	
Il tenero momento: Mozart & Gluck Arias	2001	Erato Records (CD)	Graham sing arias by Mozart and Gluck with conductor Harry Bicket and the Orchestra of the Age of Enlightenment.	
C'est ça la vie, c'est ça l'amour: French Operetta Arias	2002	Erato Records (CD)	Graham sings a variety of arias from French operetta with conductor Yves Abel and the City of Birmingham Symphony Orchestra.	
Ives: Concord Sonata; Songs	2004	Warner Classics (CD)	Won the Grammy Award for Best Classical Solo Vocal Album for section of the album "Ives: Songs (The Things Our Fathers Loved; The Housatonic At Stockbridge, Etc.)" This album features Graham singing 17 songs by Ives with pianist Pierre-Laurent Aimard. Aimard also recorded Ive's Piano Sonata No. 2 (ie. Concord Sonata) for this album.	
Poèmes de l'amour	2005	Warner Classics	Graham sings Poème de l'amour et de la mer by Ernest Chausson, Shéhérazade by Maurice Ravel, and Le Livre De Baudelaire by Claude Debussy with the BBC Symphony Orchestra led by Yan Pascal Tortelier.	
Sacred Songs	2005	Decca Records	The album's principal singer is soprano Renée Fleming. Graham joins Fleming and the London Voices choir to sing the duet "Abends will ich schlafen gehn" from the opera Hänsel und Gretel.	
Un Frisson Français: A Century of French Song	2008	ONYX Records	Graham and pianist Malcolm Martineau perform French-language art songs by a variety of composers.	
Simon Rattle: Berlioz - Symphonie Fantastique	2008	EMI (CD)	Simon Rattle leads Berliner Philharmoniker in a variety of works by Berlioz. Graham is featured singing Berlioz's La mort de Cléopâtre.	
Passing By – Songs by Jake Heggie	2010	Avie Records (CD)	Graham is one of multiple artists on this album. She sings the aria "A lucky child" from Heggie's opera At the Statue of Venus, and "Motherwit" and "Mother in the mirror" from Heggie's song cycle Facing Forward/Looking Back.	
Mahler: Songs with Orchestra	2010	Erato Records (CD)	Features conductor Michael Tilson Thomas and the San Francisco Symphony in multiple works by Mahler. Graham sings Mahler's Rückert-Lieder on this album, and is otherwise not featured in the other music.	
