= L'elisir d'amore discography =

List of recordings of the opera by Donizetti

This is a list of audio and video recordings (discography) of the 1832 opera L'elisir d'amore ("The Elixir of Love"), with music composed by Gaetano Donizetti and an Italian libretto by Felice Romani.

== Audio recordings ==
Year	Cast (Adina, Nemorino, Belcore, Dulcamara)	Conductor, opera house and orchestra	Label
1953	Margherita Carosio, Nicola Monti, Melchiorre Luise, Tito Gobbi	Gabriele Santini, Orchestra and Chorus of the Teatro dell'Opera di Roma	CD: Testament; Cat: SBT 2150
1955	Hilde Gueden, Giuseppe Di Stefano, Renato Capecchi; Fernando Corena	Francesco Molinari-Pradelli, Maggio Musicale Fiorentino Orchestra and Chorus	CD: Decca; Cat: 443542
1966	Roberta Peters, Carlo Bergonzi, Frank Guarrera, Fernando Corena	Thomas Schippers, Metropolitan Opera Orchestra and Chorus (Met Opera broadcast of 5 March 1966)	CD: Sony Classical Cat: 90991-2
1967	Mirella Freni, Nicolai Gedda, Mario Sereni, Renato Capecchi	Francesco Molinari-Pradelli, Rome Opera Orchestra and Chorus	CD: EMI; Cat: CMS 7 69897 2
1967	Renata Scotto, Carlo Bergonzi, Giuseppe Taddei, Carlo Cava	Gianandrea Gavazzeni, Maggio Musicale FiorentinoOrchestra and Chorus	CD: Myto Records; Cat: 984194
1970	Joan Sutherland, Luciano Pavarotti, Dominic Cossa; Spiro Malas	Richard Bonynge, English Chamber Orchestra; Ambrosian Opera Chorus	CD: Decca; Cat: 424912-2
1977	Ileana Cotrubaș, Plácido Domingo, Ingvar Wixell, Geraint Evans	John Pritchard, Royal Opera House; Covent Garden Orchestra and Chorus	CD: Sony Masterworks; Cat: 2796-96458-2
1982	Lucia Popp, Peter Dvorský, Bernd Weikl, Yevgeny Nesterenko	Heinz Wallberg, Bavarian Radio Chorus, Munich Radio Orchestra	CD: RCA; Cat:
1986	Barbara Bonney, Gösta Winbergh, Bernd Weikl, Rolando Panerai	Gabriele Ferro, Maggio Musicale Fiorentino Orchestra and Chorus	CD: Deutsche Grammophon; Cat: B000458002
1990	Kathleen Battle, Luciano Pavarotti, Leo Nucci, Enzo Dara	James Levine, Metropolitan Opera Orchestra and Chorus	CD: Deutsche Grammophon; Cat: 429744
1996	Alessandra Ruffini, Vincenzo La Scola, Roberto Frontiali, Simone Alaimo	Piergiorgio Morandi, Hungarian State Opera Orchestra and Chorus	CD:Naxos; Cat: 8660045-46
1997	Angela Gheorghiu, Roberto Alagna, Roberto Scaltriti, Simone Alaimo	Evelino Pidò, Lyon Opera Orchestra and Chorus	CD:Decca; Cat: 455691

== Video recordings ==
Year	Cast (Adina, Nemorino, Belcore, Dulcamara)	Conductor, Opera house and orchestra	Label
1981	Judith Blegen, Luciano Pavarotti, Brent Ellis, Sesto Bruscantini	Nicola Rescigno, Metropolitan Opera Orchestra and Chorus (Production: Nathaniel Merrill; designer: Robert O'Hearn; recorded live, 2 March)	DVD: Decca; Cat: 074 3226; Streaming video: Met Opera on Demand
1991	Kathleen Battle, Luciano Pavarotti, Juan Pons, Enzo Dara	James Levine, Metropolitan Opera Orchestra and Chorus (Production: John Copley; designer: Beni Montresor; recorded live, 16 November)	Streaming video: Met Opera on Demand
2005	Anna Netrebko, Rolando Villazón, Leo Nucci, Ildebrando D'Arcangelo	Alfred Eschwé, Vienna State Opera Orchestra and Chorus	DVD: Virgin Classics/EMI; Cat: 00946 363352 9
2007	Silvia Dalla Benetta, Raùl Hernández, Alex Esposito, Damiano Salerno	Alessandro De Marchi, Teatro Donizetti, Bergamo Orchestra and Chorus	DVD: Dynamic; Cat. 33577
2009	Ekaterina Siurina, Peter Auty, Alfredo Daza, Luciano di Pasquale	Maurizio Benini, Glyndebourne Chorus, London Philharmonic Orchestra (Stage director: Annabel Arden; recorded live, Glyndebourne Opera House)	DVD: Opus Arte; Cat. OABD7057D; Streaming: Glyndebourne Encore
2012	Anna Netrebko, Matthew Polenzani, Mariusz Kwiecien, Ambrogio Maestri	Maurizio Benini, Metropolitan Opera Orchestra & Chorus (Production: Bartlett Sher; recorded live, 13 October)	HD video: Met Opera on Demand
2018	Pretty Yende, Matthew Polenzani, Davide Luciano, Ildebrando D'Arcangelo	Domingo Hindoyan, Metropolitan Opera Orchestra & Chorus (Production: Bartlett Sher; performance of 10 February)	HD video: Met Opera on Demand
2023	Nadine Sierra, Liparit Avetisyan, Boris Pinkhasovich, Bryn Terfel	Sesto Quatrini, The Royal Opera Orchestra & Chorus (Director: Laurent Pelly, recorded live, 28 September)	Blu-ray: Opus Arte; Royal Ballet & Opera Stream
