= The Faces of Love: The Songs of Jake Heggie =

The Faces of Love
- RCA Victor Red Seal CD, 09026-63484-2

Studio album by Jake Heggie
- Released: 1999
- Recorded: 1998 and 1999
- Studio: Skywalker Sound, Nicasio, California
- Genre: Contemporary classical vocal
- Length: 78:25
- Language: English
- Label: RCA Victor Red Seal
- Producer: David v. R. Bowles

The Faces of Love is a 78-minute studio album of contemporary classical songs composed by Jake Heggie, performed by Brian Asawa, Zheng Cao, Kristin Clayton, Renée Fleming, Nicolle Foland, Jennifer Larmore, Sylvia McNair, Frederica von Stade and Carol Vaness, with piano accompaniment by Heggie and with two contributions by cellist Emil Miland. It was released in 1999.

== Background ==
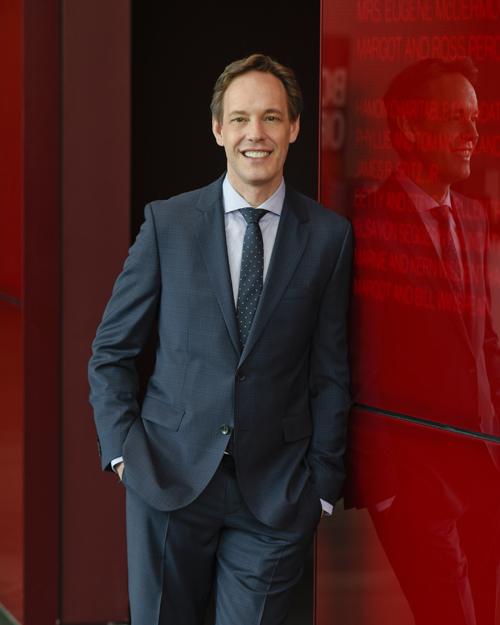
Jake Heggie in 2015

Heggie set the "powerful credo" of Emily Dickinson's "I shall not live in vain" especially for the soprano who performs it on his album, Renée Fleming, after hearing her sing in a rehearsal of Rusalka at the San Francisco Opera. He had been introduced to Dickinson's œuvre when he was seventeen, encouraged to investigate it by his first composition teacher, Ernst Bacon, who had written music for dozens of her poems himself.

Eve-Song is a cycle of eight songs setting verse by Philip Littell, a poet, playwright and librettist based in Los Angeles. It was commissioned by James Schwabacher and is dedicated to Kristin Clayton, and was premiered by her with Heggie on 27 February 2000 at the Old First Church, San Francisco. It was composed "to give the Biblical Eve a contemporary voice". The album's three selections from the cycle were assigned to Sylvia McNair because she had told Heggie that she particularly relished the jazz influences in "Snake".

Of Gods and Cats is a setting of two humorous poems by Gavin Geoffrey Dillard, a poet based in the San Francisco Bay Area. It was commissioned by Vija Nadai, and premiered by Jennifer Larmore and Antoine Palloe in May 2000 in Monte Carlo.

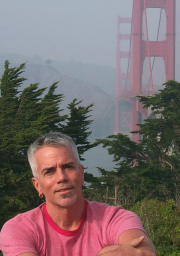
Gavin Geoffrey Dillard

Paper Wings is the fruit of Heggie's friendship with Frederica von Stade, the singer with whom he worked most often in the early phase of his career. She wrote the texts for the cycle, commissioned Heggie to write its music and premiered it with Martin Katz on 20 September 1997 in the Zellerbach Auditorium of the University of California at Berkeley. Dedicated to von Stade's younger daughter, Lisa Elkus, all four of the songs in the cycle are autobiographical. The first, beginning with a quotation of a lullaby from the Chants d'Auvergne, recalls a three-year-old Lisa getting out of bed on a frosty night to join her parents by their fireside. The second tells how when von Stade was living in Greece in her own infancy, her nanny made her paper wings with which she imagined herself flying over Athens. The third remembers how puzzled Lisa was when she encountered her first pair of mittens and wondered where her fingers should go. The fourth relates how von Stade had to be rescued by a fireman after climbing onto her roof as a child, and how history repeated itself when Lisa made the same mistake as her mother.

Natural Selection is a setting of texts by another poet based in the San Francisco Bay Area, Gini Savage. Both the words and the music were written for the singer who performs them on the album, Nicolle Foland, who premiered the work with Donald Runnicles on 27 April 1997 at the Old First Church, San Francisco. Heggie made Foland's acquaintance when she was a member of the company of the San Francisco Opera, where he was the inaugural Chase Composer in Residence. The cycle follows "a young woman's journey of self-discovery".

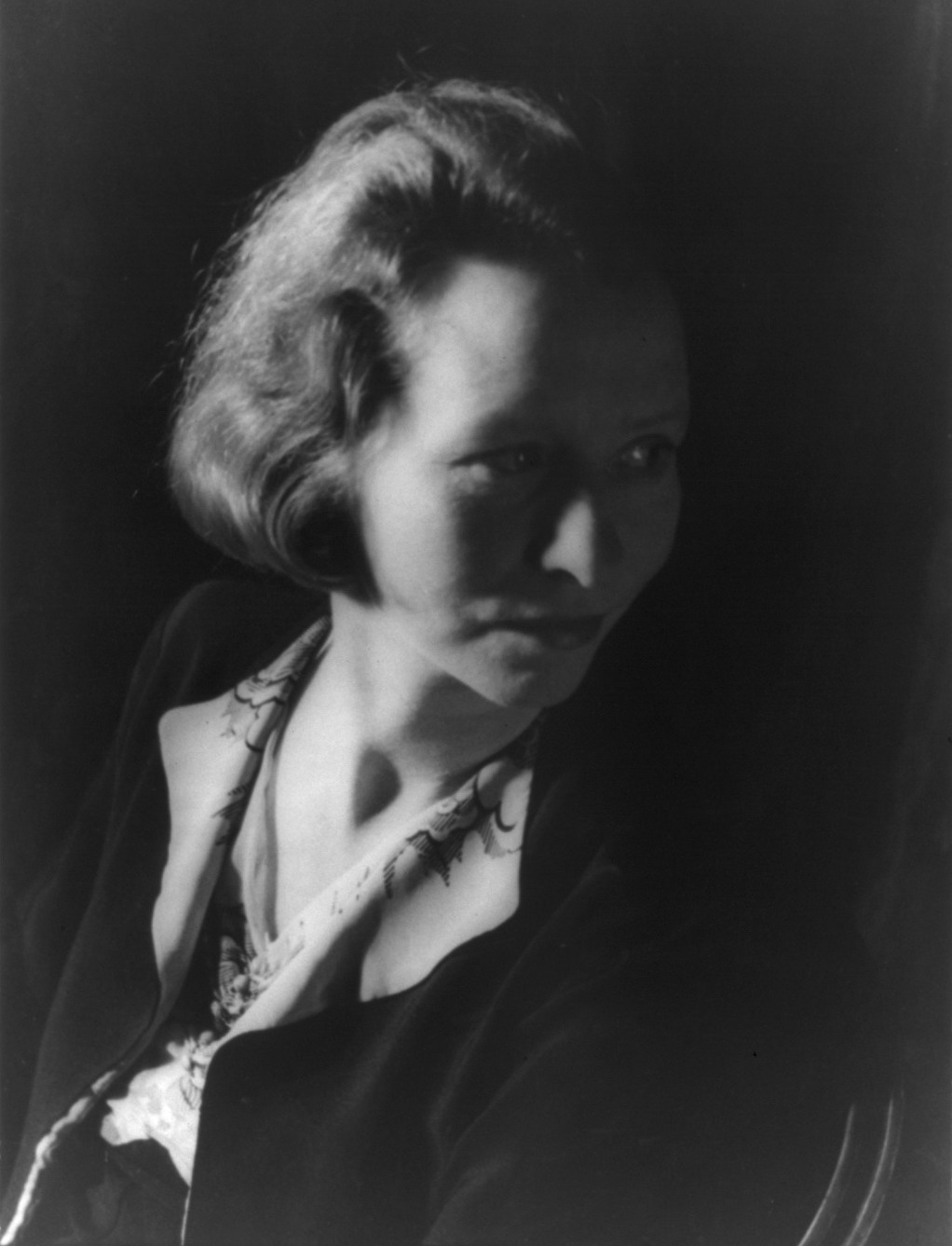
Edna St. Vincent Millay, photographed by Carl van Vechten in 1933

Before the Storm is a cycle of four songs written at the request of the artists who perform the third of them on the album, the late Zheng Cao, to whom the work is dedicated, and Emil Miland, two more colleagues of Heggie's at the SFO. Cao, Miland and Heggie premiered the work on 26 April 1998 at the Old First Church, San Francisco. Heggie picked out "What lips my lips have kissed" for his album because he thought that Edna St. Vincent Millay's "timeless testament to love, loss and perseverance" was the heart of the cycle as a whole.

The second of the album's Emily Dickinson settings, "If you were coming in the Fall" (a winner in G. Schirmer's 1995 competition for new American art songs), is sung by Kristin Clayton, another SFO resident artist. Heggie's settings of Dickinson's "As well as Jesus?" and "It makes no difference abroad" are sung by Carol Vaness, dedicatee of the latter, who recorded them between appearances in Norma.

Encountertenor was commissioned by the singer who sings two excerpts from the cycle on the album, the late Brian Asawa. Heggie and Asawa met while they were both studying at the University of California at Los Angeles in the late 1980s. Together with their mutual friend, John Hall, a teacher in UCLA's music department, Heggie conceived the work as an opportunity for Asawa to take a sabbatical from his usual work in the early music repertoire, and to express "some of the tender and more amusing aspects of growing up as a countertenor in 20th century America". Asawa premiered the cycle with Melvyn Tan on 21 November 1995 at the Wigmore Hall, London.

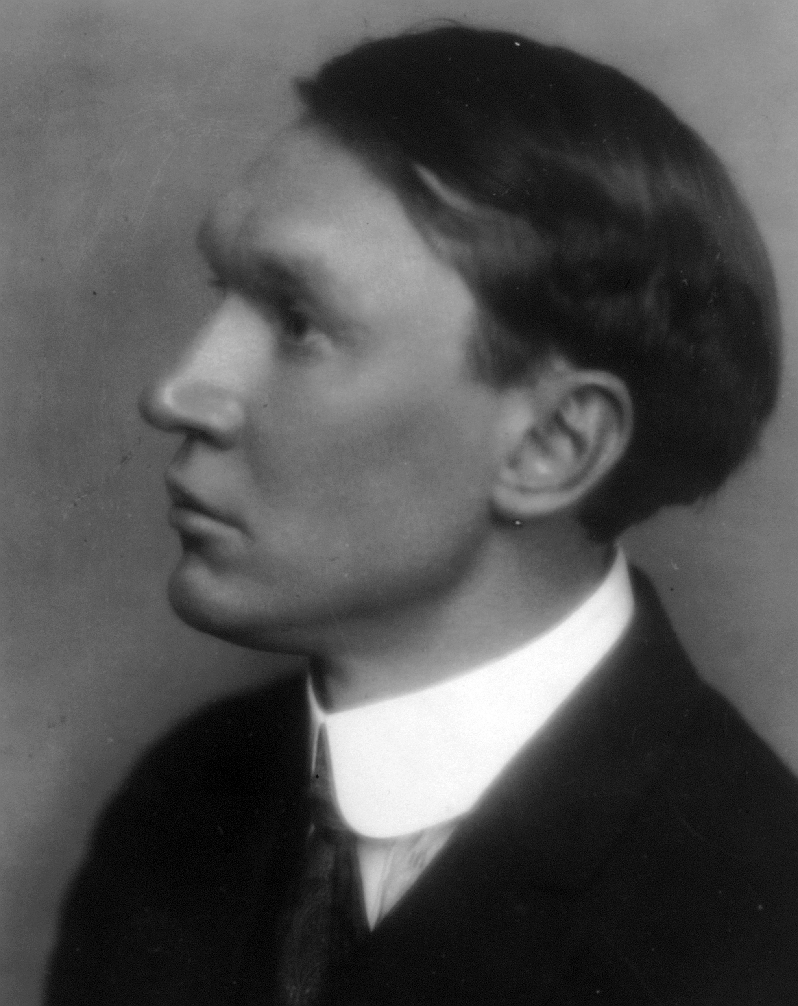
Vachel Lindsay in 1913

"Dixie", one of several folk songs taken up by Heggie, was arranged by him at the request of the singer who performs it on the album, Jennifer Larmore, herself a daughter of the South. Larmore wanted Heggie's music to express the sentiment that "you cannot go home again", which Heggie sought to do by quoting some of the Tara theme from the Max Steiner's score for Gone With the Wind.

Songs to the Moon was commissioned by the consortium Music Accord for von Stade, who premiered it with Martin Katz on 20 August 1998 at the Ravinia Festival, Illinois. Drawing on whimsical fantasies by Vachel Lindsay, the cycle sets "short fairy stories in which a personal and often very humorous view of the moon" is offered by a series of characters in turn.

"My true love hath my heart" was composed as a response both to the sentiments expressed in Sir Philip Sidney's poem and to the person who gave a copy of the work to Heggie as a love token.

"Sophie's Song", a setting of a poem by von Stade, is a comical ditty celebrating the qualities of Larmore's schnauzer dog.

The album was made at von Stade's suggestion, and was financially supported by a charitable foundation set up by the composer Gordon Getty.

== Recording ==
The album was digitally recorded on 20–21 and 28 September 1998, 17 November 1998, 15–16 January 1999 and 18–19 May 1999 on the Scoring Stage of Skywalker Sound, Nicasio, California.

== Cover art ==
The cover of the album, designed under the art direction of Alan Trugman, features a photograph by Jayne Hinds Bidaut.

== Critical reception ==
The album was mentioned in The Advocate, Billboard ("a set of songs ... sung by some of the most important singers of today") and Time ("The American art song is still alive and well, judging by this lovely CD"). It was also noted in Ken Wlaschin's Encyclopedia of American Opera and Judith E. Carman, William K. Gaeddert and Rita M. Resch's Art Song in the United States, 1759-1999.

== Track listing ==
Jake Heggie (born 1961)

The Faces of Love, with a text by Emily Dickinson (1830–1886); from The Faces of Love: Book One

- 1 (2:41) No. 1: "I shall not live in vain" (1995), with Renée Fleming

Eve-Song (1997), with texts by Philip Littell; commissioned by James Schwabacher and dedicated to Kristin Clayton; from The Faces of Love: Book One

- 2 (2:59) No. 2: "Even", with Sylvia McNair
- 3 (2:19) No. 4: "Listen", with Sylvia McNair
- 4 (3:18) No. 5: "Snake", with Sylvia McNair

Of Gods and Cats (1998), with texts by Gavin Geoffrey Dillard (born 1954); commissioned by Vija Nadai; from The Faces of Love: Book Two

- 5 (2:50) No. 1: "In the beginning", with Jennifer Larmore
- 6 (3:23) No. 2:"Once upon a universe", with Jennifer Larmore

Paper Wings (1997), with texts by Frederica von Stade Gorman (born 1945); commissioned by Frederica von Stade and dedicated to Lisa Elkus; from The Faces of Love: Book Two

- 7 (3:19) No.1: "Bedtime story", with Frederica von Stade
- 8 (1:47) No. 2: "Paper wings", with Frederica von Stade
- 9 (1:05) No. 3: "Mitten smitten", with Frederica von Stade
- 10 (2:06) No. 4: "A route to the sky", with Frederica von Stade

Natural Selection (1997), with texts by Gini Savage; from The Faces of Love: Book One

- 11 (3:19) No. 2: "Animal passion", with Nicolle Foland
- 12 (2:29) No. 3: "Alas! Alack!", with Nicolle Foland
- 13 (3:19) No. 5: "Joy alone (Connection)", with Nicolle Foland

Before the Storm (1998), with a text for No. 3 by Edna St. Vincent Millay (1892–1950); requested by Zheng Cao and Emil Miland, and dedicated to Zheng Cao

- 14 (5:30) No. 3: "What lips my lips have kissed", with Zheng Cao and Emil Miland (cello)

The Faces of Love, with texts by Emily Dickinson; from The Faces of Love: Book One

- 15 (3:05) No. 3: "If you were coming in the Fall" (1987), with Kristin Clayton
- 16 (2:29) No. 2: "As well as Jesus?" (1995), with Carol Vaness
- 17 (2:26) No. 4: "It makes no difference abroad" (1998), with Carol Vaness

Encountertenor (1995), with texts by John Hall; commissioned by Brian Asawa; from The Faces of Love: Book Three

- 18 (5:14) No. 1: "Countertenor's conundrum", with Brian Asawa
- 19 (4:18) No. 2: "The trouble with trebles in trousers...", with Brian Asawa

Dixie (1997), a Civil War folk song, in an arrangement commissioned by Jennifer Larmore; from The Faces of Love: Book Two

- 20 (3:51) "Dixie", with Jennifer Larmore

Songs to the Moon - Part 1: Fairy tales for the children (1998), with texts by Vachel Lindsay (1879–1931); commissioned for Frederica von Stade by Music Accord, Inc.; from The Faces of Love: Book Two

- 21 (2:36) No. 1: "Prologue: Once more - To Gloriana", with Frederica von Stade
- 22 (1:46) No. 2: "Euclid", with Frederica von Stade
- 23 (3:14) No. 3: "The haughty Snail-King (What Uncle William told the children)", with Frederica von Stade
- 24 (1:59) No. 7: "What the gray-winged fairy said", with Frederica von Stade

My True Love Hath My Heart (1996), with a text by Sir Philip Sidney (1554–1586); from The Faces of Love: Book Three

- 25 (3:35) "My true love hath my heart", with Sylvia McNair, Frederica von Stade and Emil Miland (cello)

Sophie's Song (1998), with a text by Frederica von Stade Gorman; commissioned by Jennifer Larmore; from The Faces of Love: Book Two

- 26 (2:18) Encore: "Sophie's Song", with Jennifer Larmore

== Personnel ==
=== Musical ===
- Brian Asawa (1966–2016), countertenor
- Zheng Cao (1966–2013), mezzo-soprano
- Kristin Clayton, soprano
- Renée Fleming (born 1959), soprano
- Nicolle Foland, soprano
- Jennifer Larmore (born 1958), mezzo-soprano
- Sylvia McNair (born 1956), soprano
- Frederica von Stade (born 1945), mezzo-soprano
- Carol Vaness (born 1952), soprano
- Emil Miland, cello
- Jake Heggie (born 1961), piano

=== Other ===
- Jake Heggie, A & R direction
- David v. R. Bowles, recording, production and digital editing
- Tom Lazarus, engineering and mastering (Classic Sound Inc.)
- Leslie Anne Jones, production assistance and additional engineering
- Bob Levy, production assistance and additional engineering
- John Schaecher, piano technician and tuning

== Release history ==
On 14 September 1999, RCA Victor Red Seal released the album on CD (catalogue number 09026-63484-2) with a 44-page booklet including notes by Heggie and the texts of his songs, all in English only, as well as photographs of Asawa, Bowles, Cao, Clayton, Fleming, Foland, Heggie, Larmore, McNair, Miland, von Stade and Vaness.
