= List of opera directors =

This list of opera directors is a list of notable stage producers and directors who have worked, or are working, in the opera world.

== A–M ==
- Christopher Alden (born 1949)
- David Alden (born 1949)
- Neil Armfield (born 1955)
- Lucy Bailey (born 1962)
- Vasily Barkhatov (born 1983)
- Stephen Barlow (born 1969)
- Ruth Berghaus (1927–1996)
- Anthony Besch (1924–2002)
- Calixto Bieito (born 1963)
- Saskia Boddeke (born 1962)
- Luc Bondy (1948–2015)
- Tito Capobianco (1931–2018)
- Albert Carré (1852–1938)
- Robert Carsen (born 1954)
- Romeo Castellucci (born 1960)
- Patrice Chéreau (1944–2013)
- Martha Clarke (born 1944)
- John Copley (born 1933)
- Frank Corsaro (1924–2017)
- John Cox (born 1935)
- Paul Curran (born 1964)
- Willy Decker (born 1950)
- John Dexter (1925–1990)
- Doris Dörrie (born 1955)
- Carl Ebert (1887–1980)
- Peter Ebert (1918–2012)
- Johannes Erath (born 1975)
- August Everding (1928–1999)
- Brigitte Fassbaender (born 1939)
- Walter Felsenstein (1901–1975)
- Jürgen Flimm (1)
- Götz Friedrich (1930–2000)
- John Fulljames (born 1976)
- Lou Galterio (1942–1996)
- Colin Graham (1931–2007)
- Robin Guarino (born 1960)
- Claus Guth (born 1964)
- Tatjana Gürbaca (born 1973)
- Peter Hall (1930–2018)
- Nicholas Heath (born 1959)
- Bohumil Herlischka (1919–2006)
- Jens-Daniel Herzog (born 1964)
- Werner Herzog (born 1942)
- Kasper Holten (born 1973)
- Joel Ivany (born 1980)
- Richard Jones (born 1953)
- Václav Kašlík (1917–1989)
- Peter Kazaras (born 20th century)
- Ellen Kent (born 1949 or 1950)
- Jonathan Kent (born 1951)
- Peter Konwitschny (born 1945)
- Barrie Kosky (born 1967)
- Constantine Koukias (born 1965)
- Tobias Kratzer (born 1980)
- Harry Kupfer (1935–2019)
- John La Bouchardière (born 1969)
- Mark Lamos (born 1946)
- Rhoda Levine (1932 or 1933–2026)
- Phyllida Lloyd (born 1957)
- Lotfi Mansouri (1929–2013)
- Ella Marchment (born 1992)
- Phelim McDermott (born 1963)
- David McVicar (born 1966)
- Friedrich Meyer-Oertel (born 1936)
- Dejan Miladinović (1948–2017)
- Jonathan Miller (1934–2019)
- Alexis Minotis (1899–1990)
- Mark Morris (born 1956)
- Elijah Moshinsky (1946–2021)

== N–Z ==
- Francisco Negrin (born 1963)
- Hans Neuenfels (1941–2022)
- Moffatt Oxenbould (born 1943)
- Àlex Ollé (born 1960)
- Richard Pearlman (1938–2006)
- Laurent Pelly (born 1962)
- Pier Luigi Pizzi (born 1930)
- Boris Pokrovsky (1912–2009)
- Jean-Pierre Ponnelle (1932–1988)
- David Pountney (born 1947)
- Olivier Py (born 1965)
- Lamberto Puggelli (1938–2013)
- Max Reinhardt (1873–1943)
- Günther Rennert (1911–1978)
- Luca Ronconi (1933–2015)
- Vladimir Rosing (1890–1963)
- Peter Sellars (born 1957)
- Otto Schenk (1930–2025)
- Oscar Fritz Schuh (1904–1984)
- Yuval Sharon (born 1979)
- Daniel Slater (born 1966)
- Jacopo Spirei (born 1974)
- Giorgio Strehler (1921–1997)
- Olivier Tambosi (born 1963)
- Andrei Tarkovsky (1932–1986)
- Dmitri Tcherniakov (born 1970)
- Mihai Timofti (born 1948)
- Mariusz Treliński (born 1962)
- Ivo Van Hove (born 1958)
- Graham Vick (1953–2021)
- Luchino Visconti (1906–1976)
- Richard Wagner (1813–1883)
- Wieland Wagner (1917–1966)
- Wolfgang Wagner (1919–2010)
- Margarete Wallmann (1904–1992)
- Krzysztof Warlikowski (born 1962)
- Deborah Warner (born 1959)
- Keith Warner (born 1956)
- Herbert Wernicke (1946–2002)
- Robert Wilson (1941-2025)
- Luchino Visconti (1906–1976)
- Francesca Zambello (born 1956)
- Franco Zeffirelli (1923–2019)
- Tomer Zvulun (born 1976)

== Sources ==
- Sadie, Stanley (ed.) (1998). The New Grove Dictionary of Opera. London: Macmillan. ISBN 0-333-73432-7 and ISBN 1-56159-228-5.
- Warrack, John; Ewan West (1992). The Oxford Dictionary of Opera. New York & London: Oxford University Press. ISBN 0-19-869164-5.
