= Dejan Miladinović =

Serbian opera director (1948–2017)

- Born: 2 December 1948; Belgrade, SFR Yugoslavia
- Died: 3 August 2017 (aged 68); Belgrade, Serbia
- Occupation: opera director
- Spouse: Vesna Miladinovic
- Children: Dejana (married: Gajdas)

Dejan Miladinović, (Serbian Cyrillic: Дејан Миладиновић; 2 December 1948 – 3 August 2017) was a Serbian opera director. He was born in Belgrade, Yugoslavia, in a family of opera artists (his father Dušan was the Principal conductor and Artistic Director of Belgrade National Opera and his mother Milica was a leading mezzo with the same opera company). He graduated with a bachelor's degree in Theatre Direction from the Academy for Theatre in Belgrade and received the title Master of Theatrical Arts from the same Academy. He died in Belgrade on 3 August 2017.

== Biography ==
Dejan Miladinović has served as Principal Stage Director and two times as Artistic Director of the National Opera of Novi Sad. He has also served as Director and Artistic Councilor for "Grand Opera Projects" with Convention Centre "Sava" in Belgrade. Dejan Miladinović was Principal Stage Director of Belgrade National Opera and he has accepted the position as Artistic Director of Belgrade National Opera (1997–2001) which was offered to him – in spite of Milošević's regime – by all the artists and staff of Belgrade Opera during their all-out strike. He was Associate Professor and Artistic Director of Opera Theatre at Meadows School of Arts, Southern Methodist University (SMU), Dallas, Texas, and Associate Professor of Opera Theatre at Faculty of Music in Belgrade, and Associate Professor at Thornton School of Music, University of Southern California (USC), Los Angeles, California. Miladinović has staged more than 160 productions (mostly operas, and then plays, operettas, musical comedies) with professional companies in former Yugoslavia and abroad (USA and Canada especially – New York, Dallas, Milwaukee, Atlanta, Seattle, Baltimore, San Diego, Vancouver etc.). He was Artistic Director of Madlenianum Opera and Theatre – Belgrade, the first private owned opera and theater company in Europe (from October 2006). He was Artistic Director of Belgrade National Opera for second time (2012/2013).

Dejan Miladinović was a member of A.G.M.A., USA; Equity, Canada; UMUS (Association of the Music Artists of Serbia); UDUS (Association of the Theatre Artists of Serbia).

== Lordship ==
The empress Maria Theresia of Habsburg dynasty in 18th century granted lordship to Haydu-Voynits family of which Dejan Miladinović is direct and legal heir.

== Productions staged by Dejan Miladinović ==
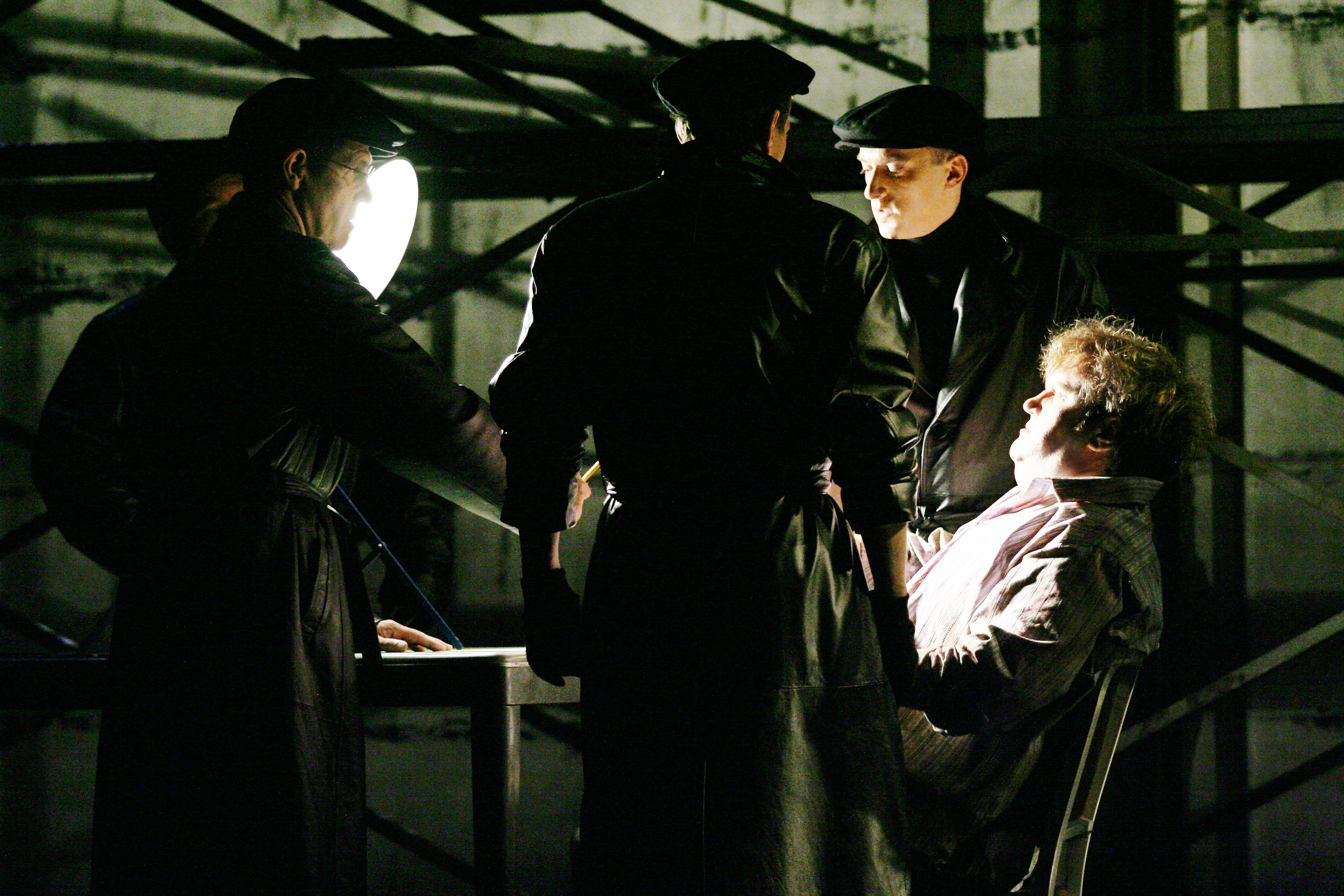
Interrogation of Florestan' scene from Fidelio

- Beethoven: FIDELIO (set and costume design – more than once)
- Bjelinski: 20th CENTURY ORPHEUS (world premiere – awarded)
- Binicki: AT DAWN
- Bizet: CARMEN (more than once)
- Borodin: PRINCE IGOR (conceived – more than once)
- Britten: LET'S MAKE AN OPERA
- Ivan Brkanović: EQUINOX (conceived)
- Bruci-Miladinovic: PROMETHEUS (libretto – world premiere – award for directing)
- Donizetti: DON PASQUALE, L'ELISIR D'AMORE (more than once), LUCIA di LAMMERMOOR (more than once – set design)
- Gallupi: Il FILLOSOFO di CAMPAGNA (award for directing)
- Giordano: ANDREA CHENIER (more than once)
- Don Marco Frisina/D. Miladinovic: IN HOC SIGNO (set & video design)
- Haydn: Il MONDO della LUNA
- Hercigonja: The PIT (conceived – world premiere – more than once – TV broadcast), In SEARCH for JUSTICE (conceived – world premiere – TV broadcast)
- Kálmán: GRÄFIN MARITZA, CZSARDASZ FÜRSTIN (set design)
- Konjović: PRINCE of ZETA (award for directing), The FATHERLAND (world premiere- set design – award for directing)
- Igor Kuljerić-Miladinovic: The POWER of VIRTUE (libretto – world premiere – TV broadcast)
- Kuljerić-Nenad Turkalj: RICHARD III (conceived – world premiere)
- Leoncavallo: I PAGLIACCI (more than once)
- Ivo Lhotka-Kalinski: The IGNORANT, The POWER
- Mascagni: CAVALLERIA RUSTICANA (more than once)
- Menotti: The CONSUL (conceived), The MEDIUM (set design)
- Monteverdi: Il RITORNO d'ULLISSE in PATRIA (conceived – award for directing)
- Mozart: Die ENTFÜHRUNG aus dem SERAIL, Le NOZZE di FIGARO (more than once), Die ZAUBERFLÖTE (conceived – more than once)
- Mussorgsky: BORIS GODUNOV (set design)
- Nicolai: Die LUSTIGEN WEIBER von WINDSOR
- Offenbach: Les CONTES d'HOFFMANN (as SF opera – version D.Miladinovic/G.Korunoski)
- Ponchielli: La GIOCONDA
- Puccini: La BOHEME (more than once), GIANNI SCHICCHI, MADAMA BUTTERFLY (set design – video design – more than once – award for directing), La RONDINE (conceived), SUOR ANGELICA (more than once), TOSCA (conceived – more than once), TURANDOT (conceived – more than once)
- Rossini: La CENERENTOLA
- Saint-Saëns: SAMSON et DALILA (more than once)
- Shostakovich: KATARINA IZMAILOVA (set design – video design)
- J. Strauss: Die FLEDERMAUS (more than once)
- Strauss: ELEKTRA
- Tchaikovsky: EUGENE ONEGIN (conceived – more than once), QUEEN of SPADES (conceived – more than once)
- Trailescu: PUSS in BOOTS (more than once)
- Verdi: AIDA (more than once), ATTILA (conceived – award for directing), Un BALLO in MASCHERA (more than once), DON CARLOS (French version – 5 acts), La FORZA del DESTINO (conceived), NABUCCO (more than once – award for directing), OTELLO (conceived – more than once), RIGOLETTO (more than once), Il TROVATORE (set design – more than once)
- Wagner: Der FLIEGENDE HOLLÄNDER (more than once – set design), SIEGFRIED (conceived)
- Ward: The CRUCIBLE (conceived – European premiere – more than once)
