= University of Hartford Hartt School =

Performing arts conservatory in West Hartford, Connecticut

Coordinates: 41.7979°N 72.718°W

The Hartt School, University of Hartford
- Type: School of Music, Dance, and Theatre
- Established: 1920
- Parent institution: University of Hartford
- Dean: Dale A. Merrill
- Location: West Hartford, Connecticut, United States
- Campus: Suburban
- Website: www.hartford.edu/hartt

The Hartt School is the performing arts conservatory of the University of Hartford, a private university in West Hartford, Connecticut. Founded in 1920 by Julius Hartt and Moshe Paranov, Hartt has been part of the University of Hartford since its charter merged the Hartt College of Music, the Hartford Art School, and Hillyer College to create the university in 1957. The Hartt School offers undergraduate and graduate degrees in music, dance, theatre, and associated disciplines. The Hartt Community Division offers a variety of opportunities in music and dance for students of all ages, backgrounds, and abilities.

== Organ studies ==
Since its founding, Hartt had an organ program of study. In 1970, the school acquired a new Gress-Miles pipe organ; it was inaugurated with a performance of Bach's Wir glauben all' an einen Gott. The organ program's director, John Holtz, subsequently launched the International Contemporary Organ Music Festival which ran from 1971 to 1984, and brought world-wide attraction to Hartt with new organ music commissions and performances from major composers and organists, including Marilyn Mason, William Albright, Iannis Xenakis, and William Bolcom. In 1982, the festival expanded to include harpsichord music. In 2015, facing total declinement of enrollment, the school closed down its organ studies program and sold the Gress-Miles organ to United Methodist Church in Babylon, New York. As of 2022, faculty member Scott Lamlein re-started a Foundations of Organ Performance course available to Hartt piano students, taught on a 1986 Wolff studio pipe organ.

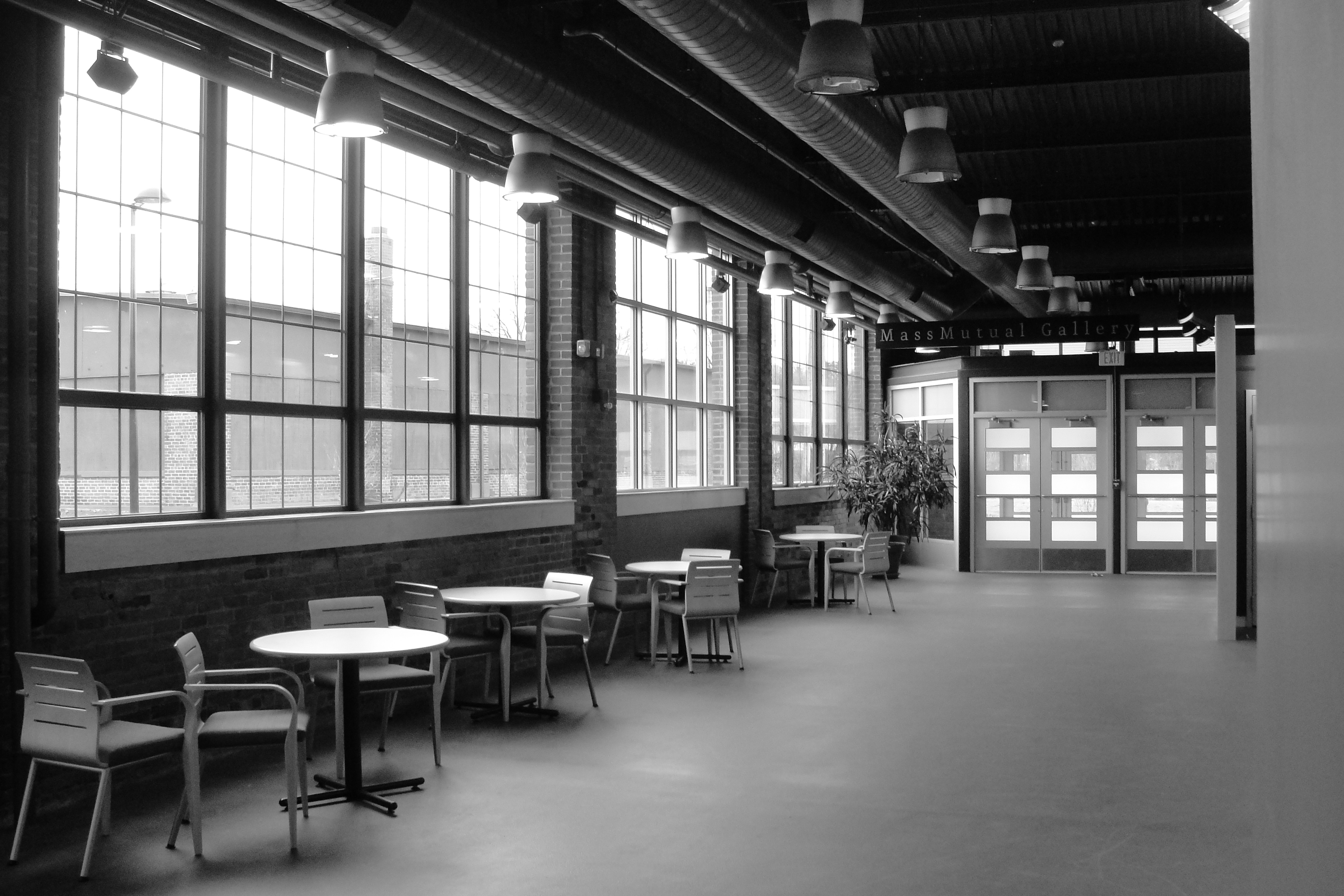
An Interior view into The Mort and Irma Handel Performing Arts Center (HPAC) at University of Hartford.

== Notable faculty ==
The Hartt School's faculty perform, teach, and present all over the country and around the world. Notable faculty members have included:

- Glen Adsit, conductor & founder of the National Wind Ensemble Consortium Group
- Robert Black, Bang on a Can All-Stars
- Robert Carl, composer
- John Feierabend, music education researcher and author
- Kevin Cobb, American Brass Quintet
- Steve Davis, jazz trombonist
- Hotep Idris Galeta, jazz pianist
- Javon Jackson, jazz saxophonist
- Jackie McLean, (former) jazz saxophonist and founder of the Jackie McLean Jazz Institute
- Rene McLean, jazz saxophonist and flutist
- Nat Reeves, jazz double bassist
- Julia Smith, pianist and composer
- Leonid Sigal, violinist
- Oxana Yablonskaya, pianist
- Gwyneth van Anden Walker, composer

== Notable alumni ==
- John Barcellona, flutist
- Peter Boyer, composer
- David Dodge Boyden, musicologist
- Robert Brubaker, tenor
- Larry Chesky, composer and Polka accordionist
- Javier Colon, musician, winner of The Voice
- David Cullen, guitarist
- Jimmy Greene, jazz alto saxophonist
- Ryan Speedo Green, bass-baritone opera singer
- Laurel Hurley, soprano
- Marin Ireland, film, stage and television actress
- Doreen Ketchens, trad jazz clarinetist and New Orleans music ambassador
- Barbara Kolb, composer
- Tony MacAlpine, Grammy-nominated guitarist and pianist
- Mia Love, U.S. Representative from Utah
- Rob Moose, musician
- Keir O'Donnell, actor
- Houston Person, jazz saxophonist
- Lynne Strow Piccolo, soprano
- Carmino Ravosa, composer
- Charles Nelson Reilly, actor, teacher
- Francesca Roberto, soprano
- Joe Souza, actor
- Teresa Stich-Randall, soprano
- Gwyneth van Anden Walker, composer
- Dionne Warwick, pop singer and multiple Grammy winner
