= Passing By – Songs by Jake Heggie =

Passing By

Studio album by Jake Heggie
- Released: 2010
- Recorded: 2007 and 2008
- Studio: Skywalker Sound, Nicasio, California
- Genre: Contemporary classical vocal
- Length: 73:39
- Language: English
- Label: Avie Records
- Producer: Steve Barnett

Passing By is a 73-minute studio album of contemporary art songs and duets composed by Jake Heggie, performed by Isabel Bayrakdarian, Zheng Cao, Joyce DiDonato, Susan Graham, Paul Groves, Keith Phares and Frederica von Stade with Dawn Harms (violin), CarlaMaria Rodrigues (viola), Emil Miland (cello) and Heggie himself at the piano. It was released in 2010.

== Background ==
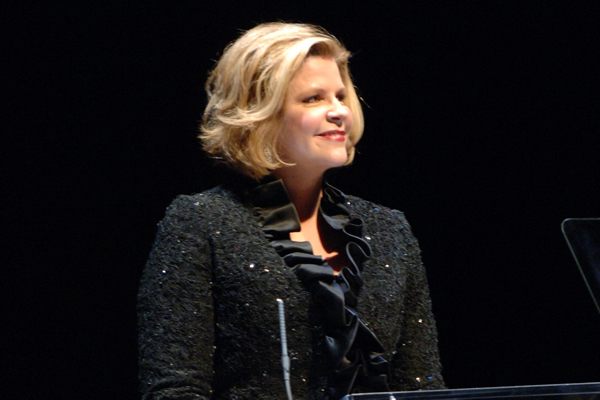
Susan Graham

According to Heggie, Passing By is about life's transience, the chances that either bring people together or keep them apart and the dismay of losing a person whom one had never expected to be without.

At the Statue of Venus, dedicated to Karen Kriendler Nelson, was commissioned by Opera Colorado for the grand opening of the Ellie Caulkins Opera House in Denver, Colorado on 10 September 2005. Originally intended for Renée Fleming, it was premiered by Kristin Clayton. This scena is about a woman on a blind date waiting to meet a man in a museum. Beginning in a nervous hope that she may be about to discover her soul mate, she gradually becomes angrier and angrier as it dawns on her that he might have seen her from a distance and decided to stand her up. "A lucky child" is the aria that she sings when she is on the verge of leaving in a huff.

Some Times of Day was commissioned through Stanford University for the mezzo-soprano Zheng Cao and the Harmida Piano Trio, comprising violinist Dawn Harms, cellist Emil Miland and pianist Laura Dahl. It was premiered by them in the Temple Emanu-El in San Francisco on 31 January 2005. The aim of the cycle is to present the experience of a single day as a metaphor for an entire life. "Minuet" is about morning, "when we wake to see an idealized version of ourselves, young, dancing, magical". "Simple" is about noon, and about how the bliss of being enveloped by beauty in the summer of one's days can be clouded by presentiments of death. "The best time of the day" is about evening, and about how the aged look back on their lives' harvest of "love, peace, beauty and bounty".

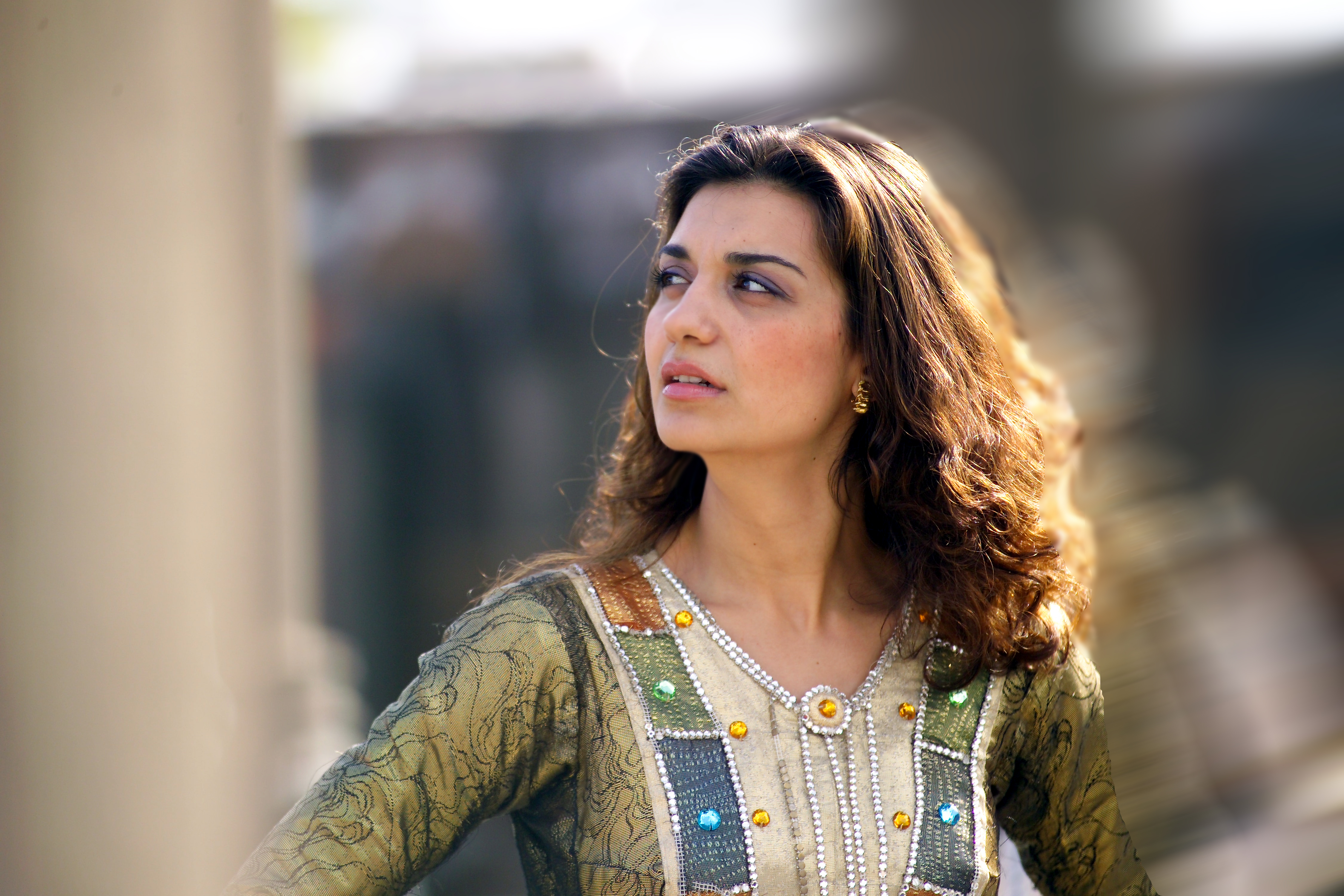
Isabel Bayrakdarian (courtesy of the Armenian Embassy)

Facing Forward/Looking Back was commissioned by Welz Kaufman and the Ravinia Festival in honour of the Steans Institute for Young Artists. It was premiered by soprano Michèle Bogdanowicz, mezzo-soprano Tamara Mumford and pianist Vlad Iftinca in the John B. Harza Building's Bennett Gordon Hall on 8 August 2007. The album presents four of the cycle's five songs, omitting "Hummingbird - for Tess", a setting of a poem by Raymond Carver. The first three are settings of autobiographical poems written by friends of Heggie's specially for his use. "Motherwit" is about a daughter wishing that she could summon her dead mother back to life and build a better relationship with her than she had been able to do in her youth. "Grounded" is about what can happen when a daughter is obliged to assume the responsibility of caring for a mother suffering dementia. "Mother in the mirror" is about seeing the face of one's dead mother in one's own reflection. "Facing forward", with a text by Heggie himself, was written by the composer when he was nineteen and studying in Paris. It is about how, having lost his father to suicide at the age of ten, Heggie coped with his personal problems by imagining the conversations with his father that he was unable to have in reality.

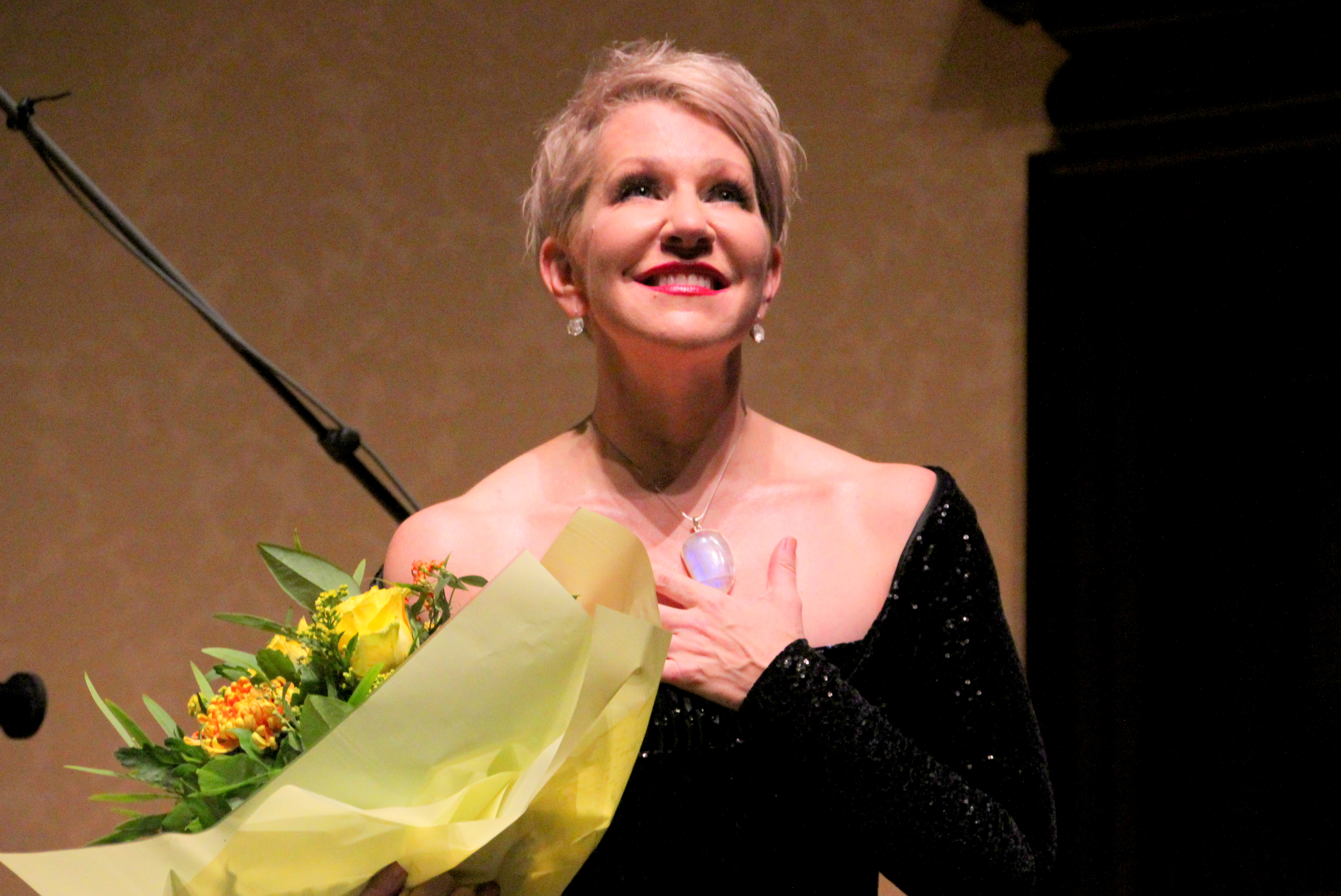
Joyce DiDonato at the Wigmore Hall

Here and Gone was also commissioned by Welz Kaufman and the Ravinia Festival for the Steans Institute. It was premiered at the Institute by tenor Nicholas Phan and baritone Andrew Garland on 6 August 2005. When Heggie was studying music at the University of California at Los Angeles, Johana Harris (1912-1995), the elderly Canadian pianist who taught, mentored and married him, introduced him to the poetry of A. E. Housman and Vachel Lindsay. In later life Heggie conceived the idea of shaping a selection of their verse into a narrative that would reflect both their personal histories and his own. The cycle's baritone, a traveller, goes back to the place where he grew up in the hope of reconciling with his friend (a tenor) who had declared a homosexual love for him that he had spurned. On returning to his home, he discovers that his friend has died, that the backdrop of his youth has been transformed and that he has become a stranger there. Part of the cycle was adapted from songs that Heggie wrote at UCLA in 1987, and some from work that he did at Edenfred, an artistic residency and community centre, now closed, that the Terry family instituted in 2004 in Madison, Wisconsin.

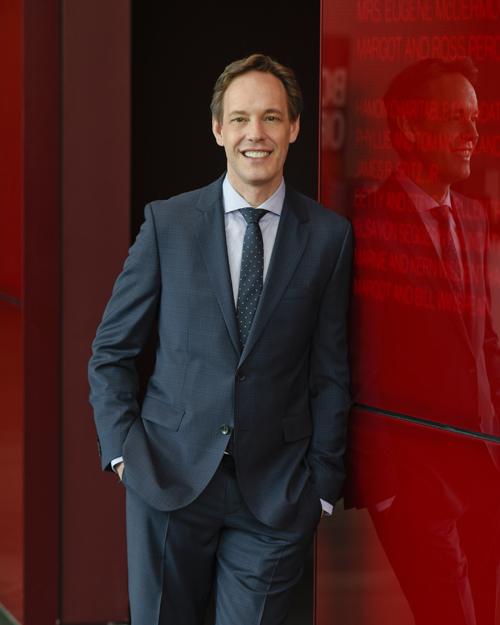
Jake Heggie

To Say Before Going to Sleep was composed by Heggie in his student days. He described it as "a response to the longing and fragility expressed in one stanza from Rilke's beloved poem".

Songs and Sonnets to Ophelia was mostly composed for soprano Peggy Kriha-Dye, and was premiered by her in the James Schwabacher recital series in the Old First Church, San Francisco on 9 May 2009. The first song in the cycle came to Heggie in a flash of inspiration in 1993 when Johana Harris chanced to say "The hills are green, my dear one". Sixteen years later, it occurred to him that the song might be a good prelude to a larger work about Ophelia, "an extraordinary young woman - pushed, pulled and used in a world dominated by men - seeking connection and agonizing over love". He felt that a real-life, twentieth-century Ophelia might well have felt a kinship with Edna St. Vincent Millay, and that the three unrelated Millay poems that he selected for his cycle were apt for telling Ophelia's story.

Final Monologue from Master Class was commissioned for mezzo-soprano Joyce DiDonato by Rusty Rolland in memory of James Schwabacher and to celebrate the fiftieth anniversary of the creation of the Merola Opera Program. It was premiered by DiDonato at the gala that Merola mounted in honour of Schwabacher on 10 September 2005. Master Class is a play about the Greek American operatic soprano Maria Callas: the monologue is a scena in which Callas ponders music and her career after a student has accused her of being rash, callous and selfish.

== Recording ==
The album was recorded on 21-24 June 2007 and 12-13 January 2008 at Skywalker Sound, Nicasio, California.

== Cover art ==
The cover of the album was designed by its art director, Alan Trugman, and features a photograph by Jay Elliott of jayelliottphoto.com.

== Critical reception ==
Edward Seckerson reviewed the album in the 2010 Awards Issue of Gramophone. Opera, he wrote, needed composers like Jake Heggie. His theatre pieces Dead Man Walking and Moby-Dick were both popular in the United States, and this was not something that anyone should wonder at. He had an innate grasp of the music latent in language, and he knew how to carry forward "the emotional memory of a moment, a connection, a feeling" through "that still much maligned enchantress", melody. Heggie and composers like him reminded us that just as songs were about drama, music-drama was about songs.

The songs in Passing By sang with a passion. Like a Broadway tunesmith, Heggie knew how to "hook" listeners "in an isolated phrase or a long line", but he also had an intuitive understanding of how to craft a song's total architecture.

In the duets of Facing Forward/Looking Back, for example, Heggie explored the relationships of mothers and their children "through the harmonic tensions and equivocations of two-part counterpoint where consonance is always a whisker away from dissonance or in one instance - the Armistead Maupin setting 'Mother in the mirror' - downright abrasiveness". The extraordinary interplay of the vocal lines in "Facing forward" - superbly interpreted by Joyce DiDonato and Frederica von Stade - was painful in its emotional truth-telling, something that it was easier to understand when one learned that the text of the piece, written by the composer himself, reflected the ten-year-old Heggie's loss of his father to suicide.

Eloquently performed by Paul Groves and Keith Phares, Here and Gone drew on poems by Vachel Lindsay and A. E. Housman on the theme of "love unrequited only to be acknowledged when it is too late". There was not a syllable in these verses for which Heggie did not find the right note. The Brittenesque "Factory window song" was amazingly acid, and the resignation of "The half-moon westers low" was enough to break one's heart.

Rilke's "To sing before going to sleep" received a "glorious and solitary" setting that Joyce DiDonato sang exquisitely. DiDonato was effective, too, in the album's closing item, a setting of the monologue at the end of Master Class, Terrence McNally's drama about the opera diva Maria Callas. An opera singer herself, DiDonato knew how to convey Heggie's profound insight into "the poignant subtext of this 'confessional'. The isolation and unforgiving 'hollowness' of the line 'Besides, it's all there in the recordings' says more about Callas's losses - her one true love and career - than the entire play."

Jason Victor Serinus reviewed the album for San Francisco Classical Voice on 16 November 2010. Until recently, he wrote, some people had regarded Heggie as likeable but superficial and mediocre. His opera Dead Man Walking had improved his reputation, and his follow-up, Moby-Dick, had proved that he was no one-hit wonder. In his new CD of exquisitely crafted art songs, he had produced an album which would probably be enjoyed by devotees of Franz Schubert and Robert Schumann, such was the "beauty and care" with which it addressed "love and loss".

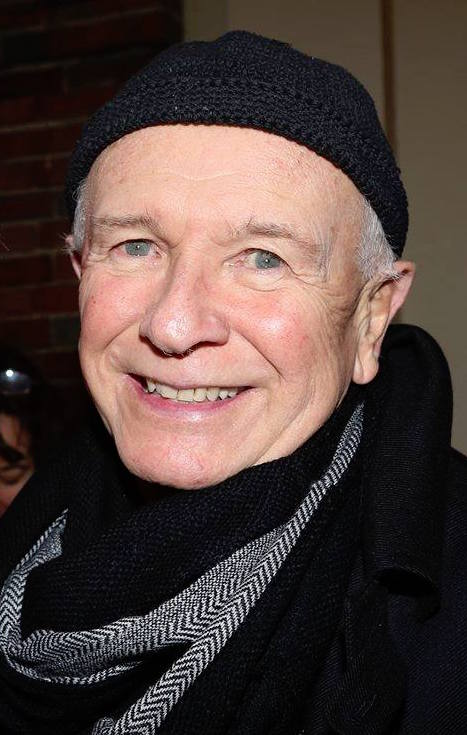
Terrence McNally

His standing in America's musical life was evidenced by the extraordinary roster of singers listed on his album's cover. His instrumentalists might not be quite as famous, but their playing was just as accomplished as the vocalism of their starrier colleagues.

"A lovely child", the first track on the disc, was typical of the mood of the collection as a whole. The work from which it was excerpted was a hilarious comedy, but the aria was something different from what surrounded it: an "introspective gem" that essayed a simple meditation on how we experience love in infancy. Susan Graham's performance of it was "so natural and relaxed [and] so deeply felt" that it went "straight to the heart".

In Some Times of Day, Zheng Cao, Dawn Harms, Emil Miland and Heggie himself were all "at their virtuosic best". Especially noteworthy were Harms's "teasing" violin in "The minuet" and a "wonderful" tune that Heggie had dreamt up for "The best time of the day".

The duets of Facing Forward/Looking Back were so wonderful that one could talk about them for days. "Mother in the mirror" was as side-splittingly funny as "Facing forward" was lovely - to not enjoy this setting of Heggie's own words would be impossible, particularly when it was performed by Frederica von Stade and Joyce DiDonato. Von Stade's mezzo-soprano blended with DiDonato's perfectly, just as it did with Susan Graham's.

In Here and Gone, Heggie had a baritone, Keith Phares, who could make a laundry list sound appealing. But the text of the cycle was anything but lightweight. Heggie was one of the few composers brave enough to tell a story about a man trying to reestablish a friendship from which he had recoiled because of a fear of homosexuality.

Songs and Sonnets of Ophelia exemplified Heggie's philosophy that love, irrespective of the shape that it took, was the most important thing in the world. Isabel Bayrakdarian sang the cycle with "the touch of youth" and, in "Spring", with "one of the softest pianissimos [that Serinus had] ever heard on disc".

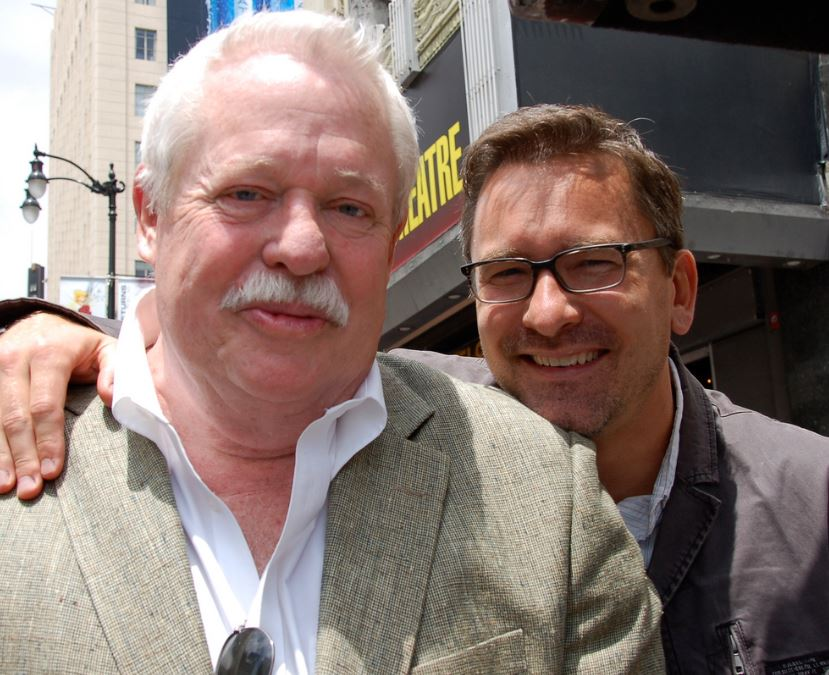
Armistead Maupin (left) and his husband, Christopher Turner

The last track on the album, a setting of the monologue that concluded Terrence McNally's play about Maria Callas, was allocated to Joyce DiDonato. She "[transcended] the temptation to wallow in maudlin self-pity, bringing far more beauty to the scene than [Serinus expected] Callas would have done in real life". The speech that McNally had written for Callas entreated her student to sing "properly and honestly". Heggie and his colleagues had obeyed that injunction and done much more beside. Their album was "a very special recording".

David Patrick Stearns reviewed the album in The Philadelphia Inquirer. He wondered "what on Earth [was] going on", he wrote, when he found himself listening to "a wacky tango characterizing a woman arguing with her dead mother - with mom answering back". Some people might wonder whether this item qualified as a song at all, but Susan Graham and Frederica von Stade manifestly enjoyed singing it and made for a happy partnership. The duet exemplified the wide spectrum of literature from which Heggie had chosen his texts, with Terrence McNally's play Master Class adding some prose to the album's poetry. The CD's second cycle of duets, Here and Gone, composed for a tenor, a baritone and a piano quartet, was engagingly reminiscent of Ralph Vaughan Williams's On Wenlock Edge.

Heggie's music could be accused of being old-fashioned, and he was perhaps too self-effacing in his piano accompaniments. But his cast of vocal luminaries performed as well as anyone could wish.

== Track listing ==
Jake Heggie (b. 1961)

At the Statue of Venus (2005), text by Terrence McNally (1939-2020); with Susan Graham

- 1 (5:44) Aria: "A lucky child"

Some Times of Day : Three songs for mezzo-soprano and piano trio (2004), texts by Raymond Carver (1938-1988); with Zheng Cao

- 2 (3:04) "The minuet"
- 3 (3:53) "Simple"
- 4 (4:10) "The best time of the day"

Facing Forward/Looking Back : Duets for two women and piano (2007)

- 5 (4:27) No. 1: "Motherwit", text by Charlene Baldridge; with Susan Graham and Frederica von Stade
- 6 (4:09) No. 2: "Grounded", text by Eugenia Zukerman (b. 1944); with Joyce DiDonato and Frederica von Stade
- 7 (3:18) No. 4: "Mother in the mirror", text by Armistead Maupin (b. 1944); with Susan Graham and Frederica von Stade
- 8 (4:29) No. 5: "Facing forward", text by Jake Heggie; with Joyce DiDonato and Frederica von Stade

Here and Gone : Songs and duets for tenor, baritone and piano quartet (2005); with Paul Groves and Keith Phares

- 9 (4:32) "The farms of home", text by A. E. Housman (1859-1936)
- 10 (2:59) "In praise of songs that die", text by Vachel Lindsay (1879-1931)
- 11 (1:53) "Stars", text by A. E. Housman
- 12 (2:32) "The factory window song", text by Vachel Lindsay
- 13 (1:00) "In the morning", text by A. E. Housman
- 14 (3:06) "Because I liked you better", text by A. E. Housman
- 15 (3:26) "The half-moon westers low", text by A. E. Housman

To Say Before Going to Sleep (1987), text by Rainer Maria Rilke (1875-1926), translated by Albert Ernest Flemming; with Joyce DiDonato

- 16 (2:48) "To say before going to sleep"

Songs and Sonnets to Ophelia (1999); with Isabel Bayrakdarian

- 17 (2:39) "Ophelia's song", text by Jake Heggie
- 18 (3:20) "Women have loved before", text by Edna St. Vincent Millay (1892-1950)
- 19 (2:!7) "Not in a silver casket", text by Edna St. Vincent Millay
- 20 (3:23) "Spring", text by Edna St. Vincent Millay

Final Monologue from Master Class (2007), text by Terrence McNally; with Joyce DiDonato

- 21 (6:28) Final monologue from Master Class

== Personnel ==
=== Musical ===
- Isabel Bayrakdarian (b. 1974), soprano
- Zheng Cao (1966-2013), mezzo-soprano
- Joyce DiDonato (b. 1969), mezzo-soprano
- Susan Graham (b. 1960), mezzo-soprano
- Paul Groves (b. 1964), tenor
- Keith Phares, baritone
- Frederica von Stade (b. 1945), mezzo-soprano
- Dawn Harms, violin
- CarlaMaria Rodrigues, viola
- Emil Miland, cello
- Jake Heggie, piano

=== Other ===
- Stave Barnett, producer and digital editor (Barnett Music Productions, Minneapolis, Minnesota)
- Preston Smith, recording engineer (Perfect Record, St Paul, Minnesota)
- Dann Thompson, assistant engineer
- Mark Schecter, piano technician

== Release history ==
The album was released on CD by Avie Records in 2010 (catalogue number AV-2198). It was accompanied by a 36-page booklet including the texts of the songs, notes by Heggie, biographies of the performers, a photograph of Bayrakdarian and Heggie by Dario Acosta and ten session photographs by Janna Waldinger of Arts & Clarity. The booklet is in English only, but Avie have published French and German versions of it online at avierecords.com.
