= Zheng Cao =

Chinese-American operatic singer (1966–2013)

- Born: July 9, 1966; Shanghai, China
- Died: February 21, 2013 (aged 46); San Francisco, California, US
- Education: Master's degree
- Alma mater: Curtis Institute of Music
- Occupation: Operatic mezzo-soprano
- Years active: 1990–2013
- Employer(s): The San Francisco Opera and other companies
- Known for: Suzuki role in Madama Butterfly
- Spouse: David Larson (m. 2010)
- Partner(s): Troy Donahue (1991; eng. 1999; d. 2001)
- Awards: 1993 Palm Beach Vocal Competition winner

Zheng Cao
- Traditional Chinese: 曹錚
- Simplified Chinese: 曹铮
Transcriptions
Standard Mandarin
- Hanyu Pinyin: Cáo Zhēng

Zheng Cao (July 9, 1966 – February 21, 2013) was a Chinese-born, American operatic mezzo-soprano known for her signature role of Suzuki in Madama Butterfly. She performed this role with opera companies such as San Francisco Opera, Grand Théâtre de Genève, Pittsburgh Opera, Vancouver Opera, Washington National Opera and San Diego Opera, and under the baton of Seiji Ozawa with the Boston Symphony Orchestra. Her portrayal of the role of Cherubino in The Marriage of Figaro also earned her recognition at several American opera companies, including San Francisco Opera, Pittsburgh Opera, and Houston Grand Opera. She died from lung cancer in San Francisco, California in 2013.

== Early life and education ==
Zheng Cao was born July 9, 1966, to parents Mao Yuan Cao and Xiao Jiao Huang in Shanghai, China. Her sister Dan Cao, four years her senior, is her only sibling. As an undergraduate, she attended Shanghai Conservatory of Music. In 1988, Cao moved to the United States to attend American University in Washington, D.C. to study English and sing. She then began attending Curtis Institute of Music in Philadelphia. In July 1990, opera choreographer and Washington Post critic László Seregi highlighted Cao's mezzo-soprano performance at the Chinese Community Church in Washington as "worth noting". In 1993, Cao earned a Master's degree from the Curtis Institute of Music.

== Career ==
In 1994, Cao was accepted to the Merola Opera Program, a San Francisco training program at the San Francisco Opera Center for opera singers, coaches, and stage directors. There, Cao sang the role of Dorabella in the Italian-language opera buffa Così fan tutte.

She was subsequently chosen to be an Adler Fellow for the San Francisco Opera. While in the two-year performance-oriented residency for promising young artists, Cao debuted in the role of Nicklausse in the opéra fantastique The Tales of Hoffmann when she covered for an ailing Susan Quittmeyer.

In 1998, Cao performed in Beethoven's 9th Symphony at the Nagano Winter Olympics '98 as a soloist for an opening ceremony concert conducted by conductor Seiji Ozawa. She subsequently appeared with Ozawa as Marguerite in Berlioz's La damnation de Faust at the Saito Kinen Festival, as Suzuki in Madama Butterfly, in A Midsummer Night's Dream with the Boston Symphony Orchestra, and for the Ozawa's farewell concert singing Beethoven's Choral Fantasy in Tanglewood Music Center.

Returning to the San Francisco Opera stage many times, Cao performed roles including Suzuki, Cherubino, Idamante in Idomeneo and Siébel in Faust. She sang the role of Suzuki at Le Grand Théâtre de Genève, Washington Opera, Pittsburgh Opera, and San Diego Opera. She later returned to San Diego Opera to sing the role of Siébel and appeared at Michigan Opera Theatre, Kentucky Opera, and Washington Opera as Rosina in Rossini's Il barbiere di Siviglia.

At the Los Angeles Opera she appeared as Penelope in Il ritorno d'Ulisse in patria by Monteverdi and Zerlina in Don Giovanni, a role she also sang at Opera Pacific. She made her debut at Opera Pacific as Nicklausse. At Houston Grand Opera she debuted in Janáček's Káťa Kabanová singing Varvara, and later returned to sing Cherubino.

Cao performed on the concert stage with the Philadelphia Orchestra where she sang Mozart's Requiem. She sang Handel's Messiah with both the National Symphony Orchestra and the Warsaw Philharmonic. She performed Mahler's Des Knaben Wunderhorn with the San Francisco Symphony, and Das Lied von der Erde with the Sacramento Symphony and China Philharmonic and on a tour of the Canary Islands. Composer Jake Heggie wrote a number of songs for her, and she performed and recorded many of his compositions.

To celebrate the Beijing Summer Olympics 2008, Cao toured some former Summer Olympics cities as one of China's cultural ambassadors to give a series of concerts with the China Philharmonic. The tour was cut short by the Sichuan earthquake in Western China, but not before she had performed for and met Pope Benedict XVI at the Vatican.

Cao performed the world premiere of two opera roles, Magali in Salsipuedes by Daniel Catán and Ruth Young Kamen in Stewart Wallace's The Bonesetter's Daughter, the latter with a libretto by Amy Tan based on her book of the same name. The role of Ruth was created for Cao, and the opera had its world premiere at San Francisco Opera in 2008.

== Personal life ==
While at Curtis, Cao performed on a cruise ship, where she met actor Troy Donahue. After Cao received her master's degree from Curtis, she and Donahue moved to Santa Monica, California. Donahue traveled with Cao to cities where she performed when he was not away doing personal appearances on cruises and at film festivals. They became engaged in 1999 and remained together until his death in 2001 from a heart attack at the age of 65. Cao then moved to San Francisco, where, in 2010, she married Dr. David Larson, a radiation oncologist who was involved in her cancer treatment.

=== Lung cancer ===
In April 2009 Cao, a non-smoker, was diagnosed with stage IV lung cancer which resulted in brain, liver and bone metastases. She was initially treated successfully with radiation therapy for bone tumors and Gamma Knife radiation therapy for several brain lesions as reported on ABC News's "Good Morning America".

Shortly after her diagnosis of lung cancer in 2009, she met Dr. David Larson, a radiation oncologist at the University of California, San Francisco and at Washington Hospital in Fremont, California, where he treated her with Gamma Knife radiation therapy for several brain tumors. Their doctor-patient relationship turned to friendship and later to a romantic relationship, and they were married in December 2010 in San Francisco. Throughout her four-year illness, Cao was treated three more times for brain lesions, twice with Gamma Knife radiation therapy and once with whole brain radiation therapy.

The chemotherapy Cao received shrank Cao's lung and liver tumors by over fifty percent in the first three months. This allowed her to continue to perform on the opera stage, singing with Pittsburgh Opera and Vancouver Opera. After 16 months the drug stopped working, and Cao began a series of both common chemotherapy and clinical trials.

The results of these treatments were mixed, and Cao's last public performance was in 2011 with the Philharmonia Baroque Orchestra. She sang Nathaniel Stookey's Into the Bright Lights, a cycle with autobiographical texts by her close friend and mentor, mezzo-soprano Frederica von Stade.

== Death ==
On February 21, 2013, Zheng Cao died from complications from lung cancer at her San Francisco home which she shared with Larson.

== Awards ==
- Finalist at the 1992 Metropolitan Opera National Council Auditions
- Winner of the 1993 Palm Beach Vocal Competition

== Honors ==
- Member of the Committee of 100
- Zheng Cao Merola Endowment, begun in 2011 to create an annual scholarship for an Asia-Pacific singer and/or mezzo-soprano to attend the Merola Opera Program

== Discography ==
- The Faces of Love - The Songs of Jake Heggie, RCA, 1999; Before the Storm: What lips my lips have kissed"
- Passing By - Songs by Jake Heggie, Avie, 2010; Some Times of Day: "The minuet", "Simple", and "The best time of day"
- Angel Heart, a music storybook; with Jeremy Irons (narrator), Matt Haimovitz (cello), Lisa Delan (soprano) and Frederica von Stade (mezzo-soprano); "All through the night", arranged by Gordon Getty
