= Bark! The Musical =

BARK! The Musical
- Original Cast Recording Artwork.
- Music: David Troy Francis
- Lyrics: Gavin Geoffrey Dillard and Robert Schrock
- Productions: Los Angeles World Premiere

BARK! The Musical is a musical with music by David Troy Francis and lyrics by Gavin Geoffrey Dillard and Robert Schrock (with additional lyrics by Mark Winkler). The book is by Mark Winkler and Gavin Geoffrey Dillard.

== Synopsis ==
BARK! explores one day in the lives of six dogs in Deena's Doggie Daycare. These dogs include a little puppy who yearns to bark like a real dog, an opera singing poodle, and a street mutt who raps and sometimes cross dresses as a chihuahua. The entire show is presented from a dog's point of view.

== Production history ==
BARK! made its world premiere in Los Angeles at The Coast Playhouse in 2004. The show received rave reviews including Critic's Choice from the Los Angeles Times. The show ran for two years and became the third longest running show in Los Angeles history. The show received nominations for Best Musical Score & Best Choreography from the prestigious LA Critics’ Drama Circle Awards. Bark! received critic's pick designation from the Chicago Tribune and played for seven months at The Chicago Center for the Performing Arts. The show has since enjoyed productions in Illinois, Oregon, Tennessee, Arizona, California, Florida, Washington, North Carolina, etc., and had its first international production in Brazil in Portuguese. BARK! has enjoyed a history of both critical and financial success.

It made its UK premiere at the Edinburgh Festival Fringe in 2018.

The show returned to Los Angeles in 2018 with an opening night of August 31 and a closing night of October 7.

== World premiere cast ==
The LA world premiere cast included Joe Souza as Rachmaninoff, Katherine Von Till as Chanel, Ginny McMath as Boo, Robert Alan Clink as Chester, Joshua Finkel as Ben, and Laurie Johnson as Molly.

== Additional production aspects ==
BARK! partners with local animal charitable organizations to help raise funds for those groups and to date has enabled them to raise over $250,000. At performances, local adoption and rescue agencies have set up in the lobby outside of the theatre with photographs of adoptable dogs available in the area, in hopes of finding them homes.

== Recordings ==
BARK! The Musical: Original Cast Recording (LA World Premiere Cast) was recorded, mixed and mastered by engineer Randall Tobin at Theta Sound Studio in Burbank, California.

Music composed by David Troy Francis. Lyrics by Gavin Geoffrey Dillard, Robert Schrock, Mark Winkler, Jonathan Heath and Danny Lukic.

Vocals: Lauri Johnson (Molly), Ginny McMath (Boo), Katherine von Till (Chanel), Robert Alan Clink (Chester), Joshua Finkel (Ben), Joe Souza (Charlie). Backup vocals: Emily Kosloski and Dan Morris.

Musical Conductor/Keyboards - Chris Lavely; Keyboards: William V. Malpede, David Troy Francis; Percussion: Matt Mayhall.

Orchestrations by William V. Malpede and Dan Morris.
