= Joe Souza =

American actor and singer

- Born: October 5, 1970 (age 55); Bloomsburg, Pennsylvania, United States
- Education: The Hartt School
- Years active: 2001-present

Joseph Souza (born October 5, 1970) is an American actor and singer. He is a graduate from The Hartt School and is best known for his appearances in the film version of the Off-Broadway musical, Naked Boys Singing, various turns in television shows, and as a performer in softcore adult pornography.

== Theatre ==
Souza starred in the Los Angeles world premiere of BARK! The Musical in the role of Charlie. He previously starred on the L.A. stage in the award-winning world premiere of Sneaux! The Musical (book by Tim Garrick, music and lyrics by Lori Scarlett) at the Matrix Theatre, co-starring Kristen Bell. He has been seen off-Broadway in Gorgeous Mosaic and Nelson Jewell's Working Out With Leona. Other regional theatrical credits include City of Angels, Ramon in the Chicago premiere of Love! Valour! Compassion!, Matt in The Fantasticks, Judas in Godspell, Kalman in The Rothschilds, and Joseph in Joseph and the Amazing Technicolor Dreamcoat. He also worked alongside Arthur Kopit in a reading of the musical Lewis and Clark. In 2009, he appeared in Dr. Seuss' How the Grinch Stole Christmas! The Musical at the Pantages Theatre in Los Angeles,

== Film and television ==
The bulk of Souza's film career has been in heterosexual softcore adult pornography movies which either aired on pay-per-view adult television channels or were released straight to video. He is often billed under the stage names Matt Dalpiaz and Marcus Leland. Between 2001 and 2009 Souza appeared in 16 such films including "The Witches of Breastwick," "Naked Sins," and "Private Sex Club".

In 2007 he appeared in the film version of the Off Broadway musical Naked Boys Singing, in which the entire cast is frontally nude for the majority of the production. He appeared in featured extra roles in the films Boogie Town and The Under Shepherd.

Souza has made guest appearances in co-starring roles on several television programs such as 90210, Criminal Minds: Suspect Behavior, The Defenders, General Hospital, Scrubs, and Make It or Break It.

== Discography ==
- BARK! The Musical: Original Cast Recording
