= Lomax, the Hound of Music =

Television series

- Created by: Christopher Cerf; Norman Stiles; Louise Gikow
- Written by: Christopher Cerf; Norman Stiles; Louise Gikow; Sarah Durkee; Peter K. Hirsch; Brian Meehl; Luis Santeiro
- Directed by: Richard Fernandes; Hugh Martin; Lisa Simon
- Starring: Lomax the Hound (Peter Linz); Delta the Cat (Jennifer Barnhart); Amy Miles (herself); Louise and Clark (Pam Arciero, Jim Kroupa); Fred the Conductor aka Fred Newman (himself)
- Opening theme: The Melody Hound Express
- Ending theme: The Melody Hound Express (instrumental)
- Country of origin: United States
- Original language: English
- No. of episodes: 13

Production
- Executive producers: Christopher Cerf; Norman Stiles; Richard Fernandes; Richard Moore
- Production location: Mississippi
- Running time: 22 minutes (approx. per episode); 28 minutes (PBS Kids prints)
- Production companies: Sirius Thinking, Ltd. Eyevox, Inc. Connecticut Public Television

Original release
- Network: PBS Kids
- Release: October 6 – December 29, 2008

Lomax, the Hound of Music (stylized in all caps; sometimes shortened to Lomax) is a 2008 American children's television series that uses a combination of puppets, live actors, live music, and animation to promote musical education towards young children (specifically ages 3 to 7 years).

Inspired by John Feierabend's "First Steps in Music" curriculum for music educators, the series was created by Christopher Cerf, Norman Stiles and Louise Gikow, and produced by Sirius Thinking, Ltd. (the company behind Between the Lions), Eyevox, Inc., and Connecticut Public Television.

Lomax premiered on October 6, 2008, and received positive reception from parents and critics.

== Premise ==
Lomax, the Hound of Music follows the adventures of Lomax (named after well-known ethnomusicologist Alan Lomax), a good-natured, melody-obsessed puppet hound dog, his fluffy cat sidekick, Delta, and their human companion, Amy. Throughout the series, the three travel across the United States on a steam train called the Melody Hound Express, and explore songs in different music genres and music styles.

== Production ==
It was initially announced that the series would premiere in 2007, but instead was released in 2008. The series was canceled on December 29, 2008, finishing with just 13 episodes. Following the cancellation, PBS relinquished the rights to the show, with Sirius Thinking assuming the primary ownership. In 2010, certain PBS stations revealed plans to rerun the series for a brief period.

== Featured songs ==
- "The Melody Hound Express" (opening) (Inspired by "Wabash Cannonball" by Boxcar Willie)
- "My Dog Has Fleas"
- "Bill Grogan's Goat"
- "There Ain't No Bugs on Me"
- "Aloha ʻOe"
- "John Jacob Jingleheimer Schmidt"
- "The Old Hen Cackled"
- "Buffalo Gals"
- "All the Pretty Little Horses"
- "The Horse Stood Around"
- "The Old Bell Cow"
- "Toodala"
- "There's a Hole in the Bucket"
- "Mother Gooney Bird"
- "The Old Oaken Bucket"
- "The Itsy Bitsy Spider"
- "Alabama Bound"
- "Skip to My Lou"
- "Row, Row, Row Your Boat"
- "Down by the Bay"
- "Michael, Row the Boat Ashore"
- "The Cat Came Back"
- "Kitty in the Straw" ("Turkey in the Straw" parody)
- "Whoa Mule"
- "Oh, In the Woods" ("The Green Grass Grew All Around")
- "It's Raining It's Pouring"
- "Ragtime Annie"
- "The Arkansas Traveler"
- "Miss Mary Mack"
- "Pay Me My Money Down"
- "Miss Mary Mack Hip Hop Remix"
- "I Had a Rooster"
- "The Bear Went Over the Mountain"
- "The Other Day I Met a Bear"
- "My Father's Whiskers"
- "Jim Along Josie"
- "She'll Be Comin' 'Round the Mountain"
- "Turkey in the Straw"
- "The Duet for Two Cats" (Gioachino Rossini)
- "Crabfish"
- "John the Rabbit"
- "The Long-Legged Sailor"
- "Polly Wolly Doodle"
- "Derby Ram"
- "The ABC Song!"
