= David Dodge Boyden =

American musicologist and violinist

David Dodge Boyden (10 December 1910 – 18 September 1986) was an American musicologist and violinist specializing in organology and performance practice.

== Education ==
Boyden received a BA (1932) and MA (1938) from Harvard University. He also studied at Columbia University and the Hartt School of Music, which awarded him an honorary PhD in 1957.

== Career ==
After teaching for a year at Mills College, Boyden joined the faculty at the University of California, Berkeley in 1939. He taught there until 1975, serving as assistant professor (1943–1949), associate professor (1949–1955), and full professor (1955–1975). He also served as chairman of the music department from 1955 to 1961.

Boyden played a significant role in the development of the UC Berkeley music department, contributing to the growth of musicology and supporting ethnomusicology, composition, and performance studies.

He was twice president of the American Musicological Society (1954–1956, 1960–1962) and served on its executive board in 1958, 1966, and 1978–1979. He was also associated with the International Musicological Society, the Royal Musical Association, the Galpin Society, and the Stradivari Society.

After a long struggle with Parkinson’s disease, Boyden died on 18 September 1986.

== Awards ==
Boyden received a Fulbright grant to teach at the University of Oxford in 1963 and was awarded a Guggenheim Fellowship three times (1954, 1967, 1970). The University of California, Berkeley honoured him with the Berkeley Citation in 1980.

== Publications ==
Boyden published in journals such as The Musical Quarterly, The Journal of the American Musicological Society, and The Strad. He authored several books, including An Introduction to Music.

His most notable work is A History of Violin Playing from its Origins to 1761, first published in 1965 and later translated into German and Polish. The book is considered an important contribution to the study of organology and performance practice.

=== A History of Violin Playing from its Origins to 1761 ===
The work is organised into four chronological sections: “The Formative Period, 1520–1600”; “The Development of an Idiomatic Technique, 1600–1650”; “National Schools of the Late Seventeenth Century and the Rise of Virtuosity”; and “The Culmination of the Early History of Violin Playing, 1700–1761”.

In these sections, Boyden uses musical analysis, organological and iconographical studies, and historical treatises to examine the development of violin technique and performance. He also began work on a sequel, which remained unfinished.
