= Lynne Strow Piccolo =

American soprano

Lynne Strow Piccolo (born 17 June 1943) is an American soprano, particularly associated with the spinto roles of the Italian operatic repertoire.

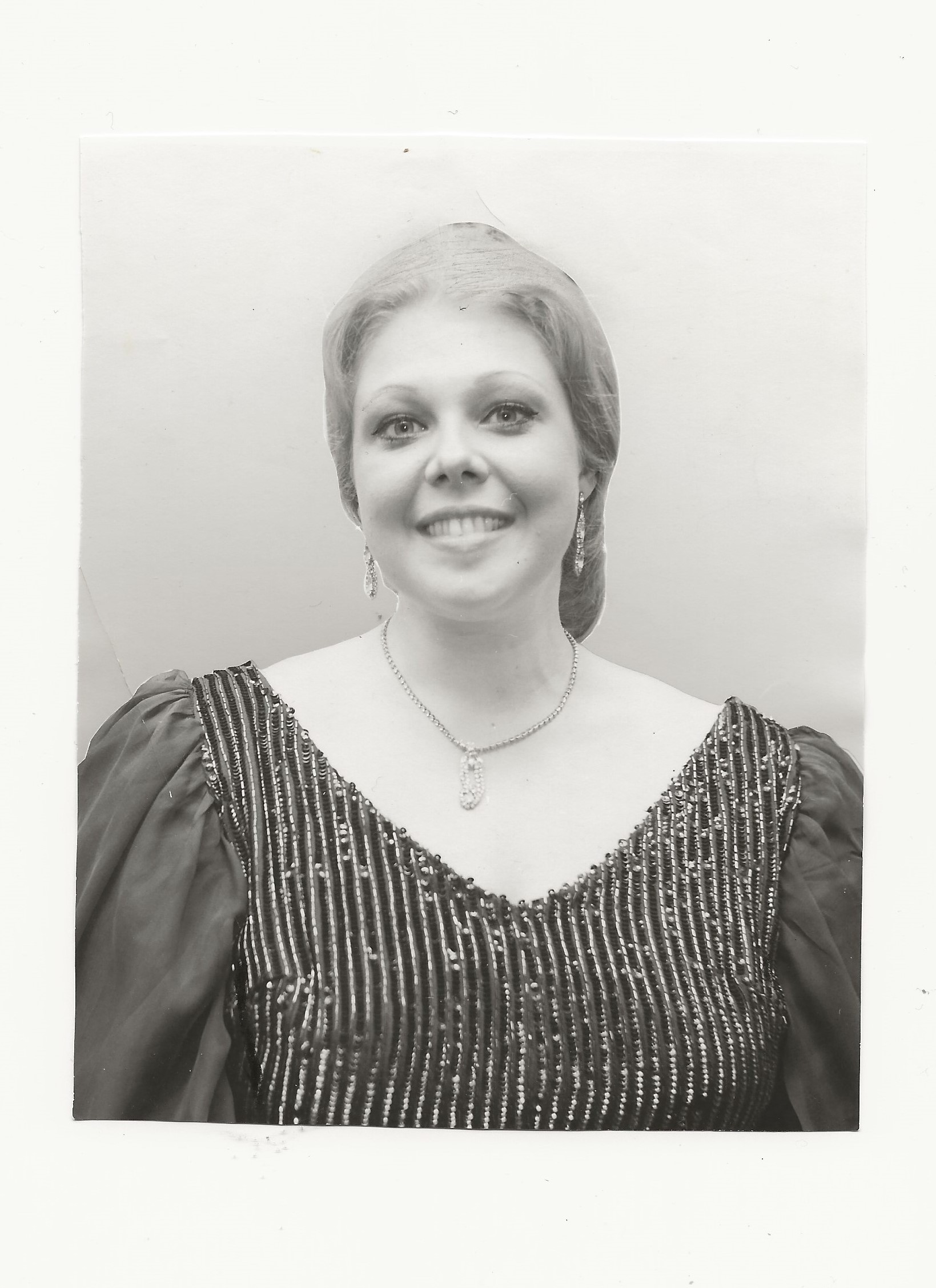
Lynne Strow Piccolo in 1978

She pursued her career mainly in Europe and made her mark in Verdi and Verismo operas.

After studies at the Hartt College of Music with Cantor Arthur Koret, she started performing in mezzo-soprano roles. In 1970 she moved to Milan for further studies with retired tenor Carlo Alfieri.

In 1974 she won the prestigious RAI-Radiotelevisione italiana International Contest Voci liriche dal mondo. Only a few months earlier she had won the highly competitive Busseto's Voci Verdiane International Contest.

Ms. Strow made her operatic debut as soprano in 1975 at the Teatro dei Rinnovati in Siena in Iphigenie en Tauride by Gluck. Until 1988, when she retired for family reasons, she performed in major Italian, French, German Opera Houses as Lodoiska, Maria Stuarda, Norma, Verdi and Verismo heroines.

She appeared at the Ludwigsburg Festival, the Budapest Opera House as Aida, the Gran Teatre del Liceu in 1981 as Elisabetta di Valois, the Salle Pleyel, the Vienna State Opera and the Arena di Verona, La Scala in 1985 as Turandot, the Covent Garden in 1987 as Norma.

She took part in the European premiere of John La Montaine's song cycle,Songs of the Rose of Sharon, at the Teatro di San Carlo in 1975 and in Verdi's Messa da Requiem commemorating the fortieth anniversary of the Invasion of Poland, in Krakow Cathedral and Warsaw's main square.

Ms. Strow occasionally returned to her home country for performances at the San Diego Opera as Desdemona in 1976 and, in later years, the New Orleans Opera, the Florida Grand Opera, with the Indianapolis Symphony Orchestra.

She also appeared as Sieglinde, her only Wagnerian role, and recorded Operas (Leoncavallo's Zaza', Isabeau, Nerone, Amica) and Concerts for RAI, Radio France, Dutch and German Rundfunks.

She was noteworthy for radiance of sound and propriety of style in Oratorios (La Resurrezione, Lazarus), Cantatas (Apollo e Dafne), Concert Arias.

Strow's voice is known for intensity, yet with a sweetness, and capable of modulations.

== Awards ==
- 1975 Apollo Musagete-Guido Monaco Award for Music, Talla(Arezzo)

== Sources ==
- Kutsch, K.J.- Riemens, L. Grosses Sangerlexicon, Bern-Munich, 1997, p. 3378.
