= John Feierabend =

- Website: http://www.feierabendmusic.org

John Martin Feierabend (born November 29, 1952) is an American music education researcher, pedagogue, and author. He is known for his First Steps in Music and Conversational Solfege music education curricula, as well as his contributions to the music intelligence education for young children. His methodologies combine the teachings of Edwin Gordon and Zoltán Kodály. He is currently the Director of Music Education at the Hartt School of the University of Hartford. As an author, he is widely held in libraries worldwide.

== Research ==
Feierabend's original research, conducted in his time at Temple University, is entitled The Effects of Specific Tonal Pattern Training On Singing and Aural Discrimination Abilities of First Grade Children. In this study, Feierabend investigated the outcomes of singing and aural discrimination. Four groups of children were taught pre-determined amalgamations of tonal patterns that were either easy to sing and easy to aurally discriminate, or patterns that were more difficult to sing and aurally discrimination. This test lasted for five minutes over the series of seven weeks. After analysis, evidence showed that singing and aural discrimination abilities become more similar in students who echo patterns which are easy to sing. This research suggests better singing skills are fostered in children who echo patterns varied in singing difficulty, and aural discrimination abilities are improved if echoed patterns are easy to sing.

Despite criticism on the level of detail and methodology used in the study, this study has been frequently cited in supporting claims regarding pitch matching and singing by important researchers. Kenneth Phillips included Feierabend's work in his study, "The Relationship of Singing Accuracy to Pitch Discrimination and Tonal Aptitude Among Third-Grade Students".

Another study, Song Recognition among Preschool-Age Children: An Investigation of Words and Music investigated relationships between words and pitch and melody recognition. The study found that preschool children more accurately recognized songs performed without texts when they had heard them performed previously with texts. Another conclusion from this study is that distinct melodies were more easily recognized than similar melodies, regardless if the melodies had text.

== Lomax, the Hound of Music ==
Inspired by the First Steps in Music curriculum, Christopher Cerf and PBS TV created a television show entitled Lomax, the Hound of Music. The show, approximately 22 minutes in length, presented a dog puppet, named Lomax (for Alan Lomax), who travels the country searching for folk songs. The show features minimally produced music, using only guitar and voice - an outgrowth of the emphasis on the acoustic nature of Feierabend's First Steps in Music approach.

== Honors and awards ==
- National Association for Music Education (NAfME): Lowell Mason Fellow
- Connecticut Music Educators Association: University Educator of the Year
- Wayne State University: Outstanding Alumni Award
- American Kodály Educators: Outstanding Educator Award
- University of Hartford: James Bent Award
- LEGO Foundation: first U.S. recipient of the LEGO Prize, an international award given annually to “an individual who has made a distinctive contribution to the betterment of children.”
