= Julius Hartt =

American musician (1869–1942)

Julius Stephen Hartt
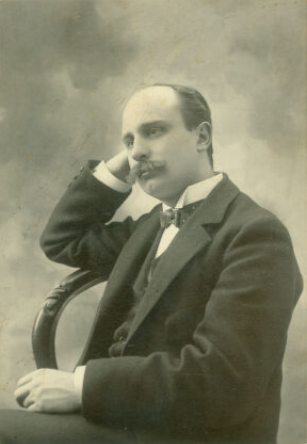
- Portrait of Julius S. Hartt, taken c. 1899
- Born: 1869
- Died: 1942 (aged 72–73)
- Occupations: Pianist, organist, teacher and writer
- Parent(s): Aaron Hartt and Helen M. Libby

Julius Stephen Hartt (1869 – 1942) was an American music educator, pianist and founder of the Julius Hartt School of Music, known today as The Hartt School (which is located at the University of Hartford). His contributions to higher education in music in the Northeast were numerous.

== Early life ==
Julius Hartt was born in 1869 in Boston, Massachusetts, into a Baptist family. His Father, Rev. Aaron Hartt, was a Baptist minister.

Hartt studied piano with Carl Baermann Jr. and Louis Maas in Boston. He later studied in Berlin in 1890 with Ernst Jedliczka and Wilhelm Berger, and in Vienna. He was an assistant to Jedliczka while in Berlin. Centering around New England, Hartt established his earliest piano studios in Maine and Massachusetts.

== Boston and Maine ==
Hartt taught music at the Collonnade Building in Brookline, Massachusetts in 1891, where he also resided. Hartt removed to the town of Skowhegan, Maine about 1893, where he taught piano lessons and music theory. He also taught piano lessons in the city of Augusta, Maine, advertising the Leschetizky method. Hartt was organist at St. Mark's Episcopal Church in Augusta from 1896 to 1897 and choirmaster and organist at the Congregational Church in Augusta before 1901. He was a founder of the Augusta Musical Chorus and collaborated with the Cecilia Club in Augusta, which promoted concerts of local and international performers including tenor J.C. Bartlett in 1899.

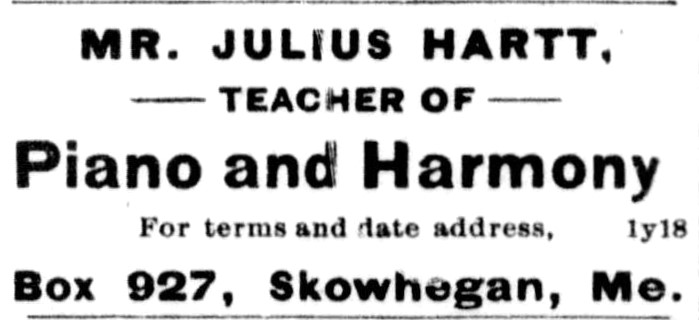
Advertisement for music instructor Julius Hartt, Maine 1895

Hartt taught piano lessons once more during the summer months at Augusta in 1905. He married Jennie A. Hall in 1898 at Augusta, who later taught with Hartt at his first music school in Hartford, Connecticut.

He returned to the Boston area by 1902, residing in the Dorchester neighborhood and Newton, Massachusetts. Hartt operated a private piano studio on Boylston Street in Boston during this time, as well as teaching out of his home studio in Newton. Hartt and his wife later moved to Wellseley in 1907.

== Initial activities in Connecticut ==
Julius Hartt began teaching music in Hartford, Connecticut in 1906. Hartt was appointed to direct music at Asylum Hill Congregational Church in Hartford in 1909, as organist. He remained at Asylum Hill until 1910. Hartt operated two private piano studios before 1914 in Connecticut, one located on Niles Street in the city of Hartford and the other on Chapel Street in New Haven. He also advertised sharing a studio with voice teacher George Chadwick Stock in New Haven in 1914. Hartt had previously been the private piano instructor to Morris Perlmutter, alias Moshe Paranov, a future business partner in Hartford. They shared a music studio in New Haven. Prior to 1914, Hartt also taught music at the Good Will Club in Hartford, where his pupil Moshe Paranov conducted the group's orchestra. Hartt also collaborated with the Von Ende School of Music of New York led by Herwegh von Ende.

During WWI, Hartt was the music critic of the former local newspaper, The Hartford Times. He met composer Ernest Bloch about the year 1917, remaining a close friend and confidant of Bloch throughout his life. Bloch praised Julius Hartt's writings in The Hartford Times, particularly his "Letters to a Young Musician" published in March 1918. Hartt also advocated for private piano lessons to count as high school credit in a paper he presented at the 38th Music Teachers National Association conference in 1916.

== The Julius Hartt School ==
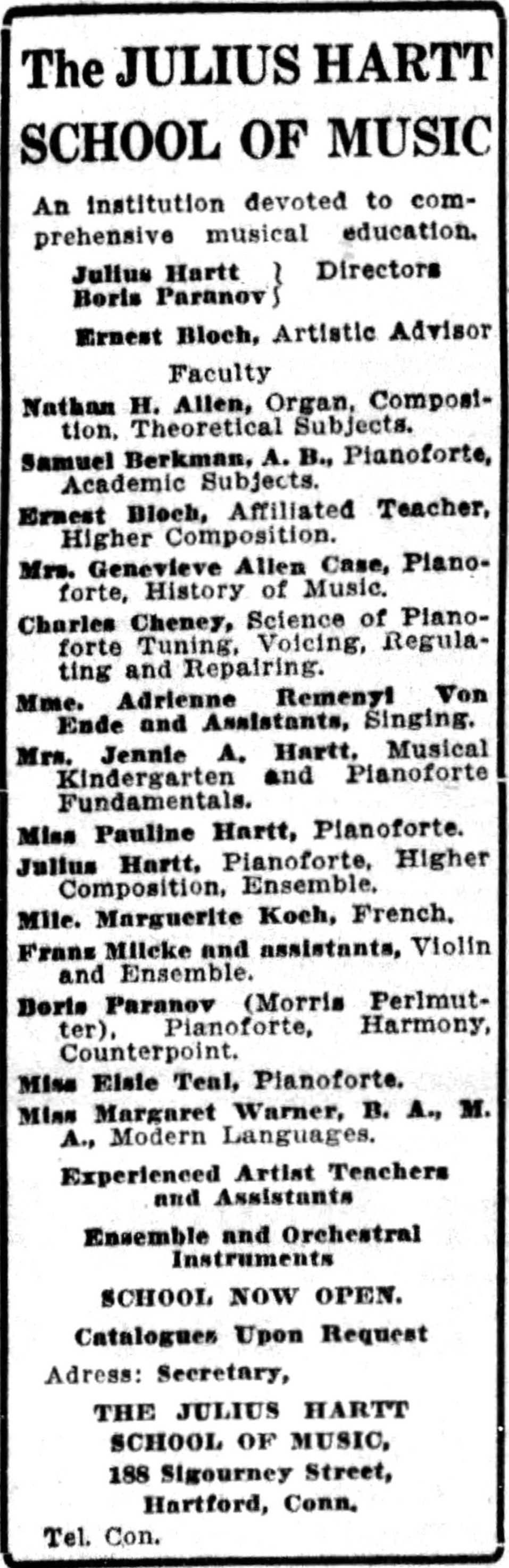
Advertisement for The Julius Hartt School of Music, 1920

Hartt planned a small private music school in 1919, to be opened in Hartford. It was named the Julius Hartt School of Music, opening in 1920, initially specializing in the instruction of keyboard, violin and voice. Moshe Paranov was a co-founder with Hartt, with whom he originally established the school as Julius Hartt, Moshe Paranov, and Associated Teachers. The first school was located at Hartt's home on Sigourney Street in Hartford, then moved to a converted private residence at 222 Collins Street. The school began college courses in 1927.

Hartt retired from teaching at the school in 1936, whereafter most activities were taken over by Moshe Paranov.

== Death and legacy ==
Julius Hartt died in West Hartford, Connecticut on September 10, 1942. In addition to establishing The Hartt School of Music, he is remembered for contributing to the endowment of Trinity College in Hartford, sponsoring free concerts by Hartt School faculty and students at Bushnell Memorial Hall, serving on the board of trustees of the Symphony Society of Connecticut, founding the Hartford Musical Foundation (renamed the Julius Hartt Musical Foundation) in 1934 with former president of the Hartford Electric Light Company Viggo E. Bird and for his many pupils who went onto become concert pianists, accompanists, music educators and conservatory leaders in the U.S. and abroad. Julius Hartt's motto was "Music is life; life is art; art is nature molded in the crucible of discipline."

His papers are archived at the University of Hartford Archives and Special Collections.
