= Evelino Pidò =

Italian conductor

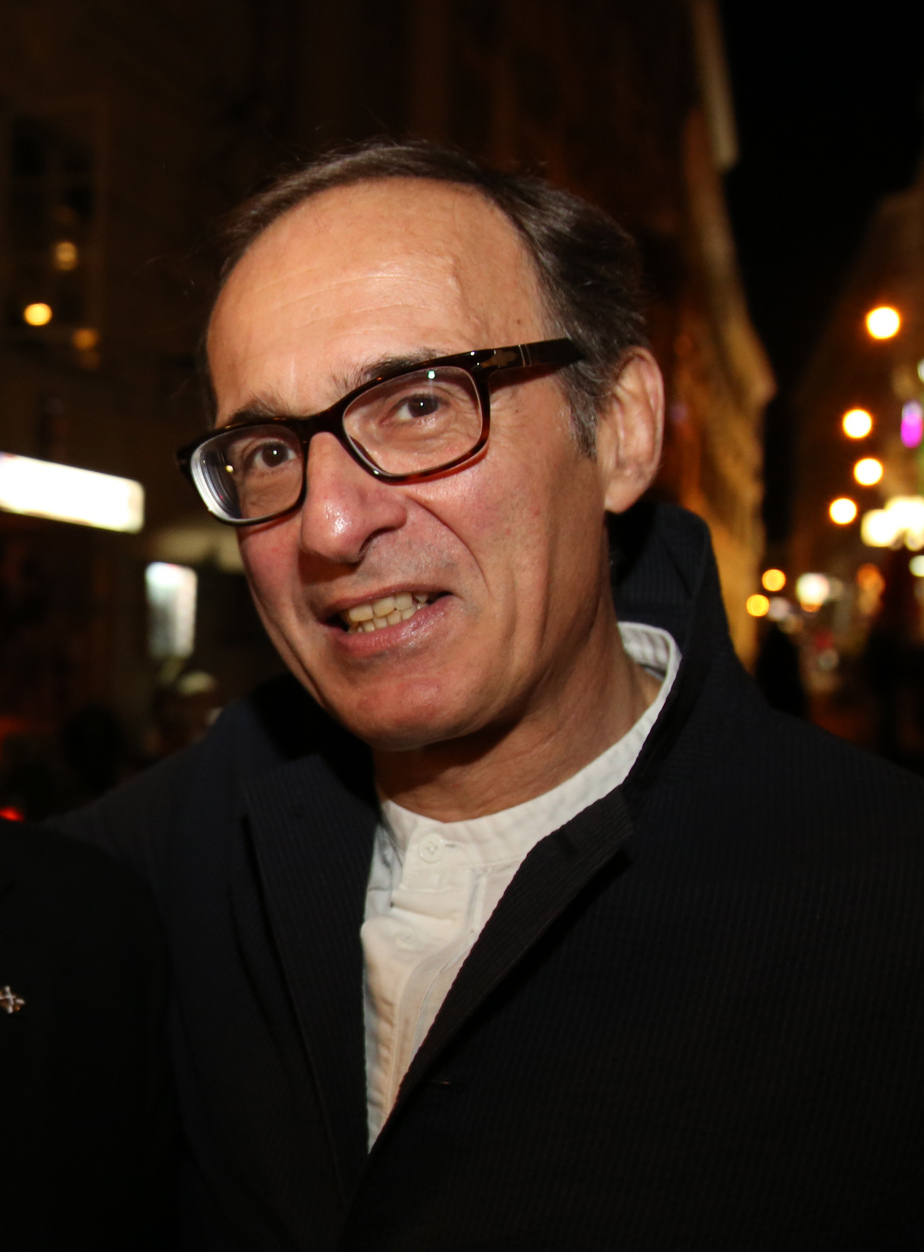
Evelino Pidò (2015)

Evelino Pidò (born 1953 in Torino) is an Italian conductor. Acclaimed for his Bellini and Donizetti interpretations, he has served as conductor of the Lyon Opera. Gramophone said "Evelino Pido is a specialist in this repertory [Donizetti] and he leads the Geneva forces in a well balanced account of what many people consider Donizetti's masterpiece."
