= Gavin Geoffrey Dillard =

American poet and songwriter

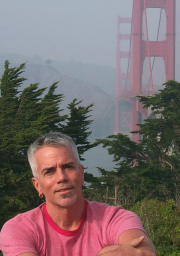
- Born: November 28, 1954 (age 71); Asheville, North Carolina, United States
- Occupations: Author, poet

Gavin Geoffrey Dillard (born November 28, 1954) is an American poet and songwriter. He is the author of nine books of verse, two poetry anthologies, a memoir, numerous popular and classical art songs. He wrote many of the lyrics for Bark! The Musical. An award-winning opera, When Adonis Calls, is composed entirely of Dillard's poetry.

== Early life ==
Dillard was born in Asheville, North Carolina, on November 28, 1954. He was in the high school program at the North Carolina School of the Arts and also attended California Institute of the Arts. His first chapbook of poetry, Twenty Nineteen Poems, was published by Ian Young's Catalyst Press when Dillard was 20 years old.

== Hollywood years ==
During the late 1970s, Dillard lived in Hollywood, California, and his experiences there figured heavily in his autobiography, In the Flesh: Undressing for Success, published in 1997 by Barricade Books. Dillard's portraits have been drawn by Tom of Finland and Don Bachardy. Photos of Dillard have appeared in Playgirl and many gay publications.

== Bibliography ==
Dillard is the author of nine books of homoerotic poetry, the first of which was published when he was 20. Dillard collected and published two anthologies of gay poetry, Between the Cracks, and A Day for a Lay: A Century of Gay Poetry. Many of Dillard's private letters, notes, and files were donated by Dillard to the Gay and Lesbian Archives of the San Francisco Public Library.

- Twenty Nineteen Poems (1975)
- Rosie Emissions (1978)
- Notes From a Marriage (1983)
- Waiting for the Virgin (1985)
- Pagan Love Songs (1987)
- The Naked Poet (1989)
- Yellow Snow (1993)
- In the Flesh: Undressing for Success (1997)
- Between the Cracks (1997)
- A Day for a Lay: A Century of Gay Poetry (1999)
- Nocturnal Omissions – A Tale of Two Poets (2011), co-authored with Eric Norris
- Graybeard Abbey (2017)

== Songwriting ==
Dillard wrote many of the lyrics for Bark! The Musical. His songwriting work (as lyricist) also includes "The Rescue," recorded by Sam Harris and Janis Ian, and art songs set to music by composers Jake Heggie, Clint Borzoni, Glen Roven. Dillard wrote book and lyrics for OMFG!!! – an iLove Story, which opened at the ODC Theater in San Francisco on July 8, 2011. The music was written by Christopher Winslow. When Adonis Calls is a new opera composed by Clint Borzoni with a libretto created by John de los Santos entirely from the poetry of Gavin Dillard. The opera won "best new work" laudits from both Fort Worth Opera's "Frontiers," as well as OPERA America. When Adonis Calls officially premiered with the Asheville Lyric Opera in Asheville, NC, on May 11, 2018.
