= Ekaterina Siurina =

Russian operatic soprano

Ekaterina Siurina (Екатерина Сюрина; born 2 May 1975) is a Russian operatic soprano.

== Life ==
Born in Swerdlowsk, Siurina studied voice at the Russian Institute of Theatre Arts. She made her stage debut during her studies, as Gilda (Rigoletto) at the Novaya Opera Theatre. She appeared as a guest at the Metropolitan Opera, the Royal Opera House Covent Garden (2003/04), la Scala, Gran Teatre del Liceu, Vienna State Opera, Deutsche Oper Berlin (2005) Paris Opera and Hamburg State Opera, Bavarian State Opera, the Salzburg Festival (2006) and the Glyndebourne Festival.

In 2016, she first appeared in Australia at the Sydney Opera House as Leila (Les pêcheurs de perles).

Her roles include Pamina (Die Zauberflöte), Susanna (Le nozze di Figaro), Zerlina (Don Giovanni), Antonia (The Tales of Hoffmann), Amina (La sonnambula), Adina (L'elisir d'amore), Giulietta (I Capuleti e i Montecchi), Violetta Valéry (La traviata), Nanetta (Falstaff), Mimì (La Bohème) and Anne Trulove (The Rake’s Progress).

Siurina is married to the American tenor Charles Castronovo and lives in Berlin.

== Recordings ==
- Amour Éternel Audio-CD with Charles Castronovo among others (2020, Label: Delos)
- Medtner: Songs Audio-CD with Iain Burnside among others (2018, Label: Delphian)
- Amore e Morte Audio-CD with Ian Burnside (2013, Label: Opus Arte)

== Videos ==
- L’elisir d’amore DVD (2010, Label: Opus Arte) with Peter Auty, Alfredo Daza, Luciano di Pasquale, Eliana Pretorian, Maurizio Benini, Annabel Arden, London Philharmonic Orchestra, The Glyndebourne Chorus
