= Lou Galterio =

American stage director

Lou Galterio (born on November 29, 1942; died in St Louis, Missouri, on June 20, 1996) was a noted stage director of opera. He studied drama and English at Marquette University.

His productions were seen at the Opera Theatre of St. Louis (including Albert Herring, which was televised in 1978, Così fan tutte, Le nozze di Figaro, Gianni Schicchi, Ariadne auf Naxos, Maddalena), Santa Fe Opera (including Neues vom Tage, Il cappello di paglia di Firenze, and his posthumous production of Don Giovanni), Washington Opera (Anna Bolena and Postcard from Morocco), Opera Pacific (Regina), Dallas Opera (Madama Butterfly), Connecticut Grand Opera (Carmen), and the New Orleans Opera Association (La traviata, Il barbiere di Siviglia, L'elisir d'amore, Lucia di Lammermoor, Macbeth, and La bohème).

Galterio was, from 1977 to 1989, director of opera production at the Manhattan School of Music, where he staged The Nose, Sancta Susanna, Eine florentinische Tragödie, The English Cat, Feuersnot, Cendrillon, etc.

In 1980, Galterio made his New York City Opera debut, with an acclaimed production of La Cenerentola (with Susanne Marsee, Rockwell Blake, and Alan Titus), which was televised over PBS. He later staged Die lustigen Weiber von Windsor and Susannah for the company.

Lou Galterio died at the age of fifty-three, from heart failure, following a long illness.
