= Boris Pinkhasovich =

Operatic baritone

- Борис Пинхасович
- Born: 14 November 1986 (age 39); Sankt-Peterburg
- Occupation: Opera singer
- Years active: 2011–present
- Website: borispinkhasovich.com

Boris Pinkhasovich (born 14 November 1986) is a Russian-Austrian baritone, known for his leading roles in opera theaters, such as the Vienna State Opera, Bavarian State Opera, Royal Opera House Covent Garden and Teatro alla Scala.

== Life and career ==
Boris Pinkhasovich was born in Saint Petersburg into a family of musicians. His exceptional musical talent was recognized early and he studied conducting and singing (with world-famous mezzo-soprano Irina Bogacheva) at the Saint Petersburg Conservatory of Music. Upon graduating cum laude in 2011, he was immediately engaged as a soloist at the prestigious Mikhailovsky Theatre in St. Petersburg, where he sang in numerous principal roles.

His international career took off with engagements at the Royal Opera House Covent Garden (Shchelkalov in "Boris Godunov", Marcello in "La Bohème" and Belcore in "L'elisir d'amore"), Opéra Bastille (Shchelkalov in "Boris Godunov"), Vienna State Opera (Figaro in "Barbiere di Siviglia", Onegin in "Eugen Onegin", Sharpless in "Madama Butterfly", Ford in "Falstaff", Rodrigo in "Don Carlo", Lescaut in "Manon Lescaut", Yeletsky in "Queen of Spades", Marcello in "La Bohème"), Bavarian State Opera (Paolo Albiani in "Simon Boccanergra", Onegin in "Eugen Onegin", Ford in "Falstaff", Sharpless in "Madama Butterfly", Lescaut in "Manon Lescaut", Platon Kovalyov in Shostakovich's "Nos", Rodrigo in "Don Carlo", Yeletsky in "Queen of Spades"), Semperoper Dresden (Sharpless in "Madama Butterfly"), Teatro alla Scala (Marcello in "La Bohème" and Enrico in "Lucia di Lammermoor").

He appeared as soloist at a Gala Concert at Chorégies d'Orange in France, at the Royal Opera House Hvorostovsky Memorial Concert in London, at the Salzburg Festival (Thésée in Enescu's "Ödipe"), at the Easter Festival in Baden-Baden and the Philharmonie Berlin (Yeletsky in "Queen of Spades").

In December 2023 Boris Pinkhasovich became an Austrian citizenship in the special interest of the Republic of Austria for extraordinary achievements.
