= List of compositions by Jake Heggie =

This is a list of compositions by Jake Heggie sorted by genre, date of composition, and title.

Genre	Date	Title	Text	Orchestration	Notes
Opera	2000	Dead Man Walking	Libretto by Terrence McNally	An opera in two acts	Based on the book of the same name by Sister Helen Prejean. Commissioned by San Francisco Opera.
Opera	2000	Again	Libretto by Kevin Gregory	Operatic scene for four solo voices (soprano, mezzo-soprano, tenor and baritone) with chamber orchestra	Commissioned by the EOS Orchestra (Jonathan Sheffer, music director).
Opera	2003	The End of the Affair	Libretto by Heather McDonald	An opera in two acts	Based on the novel of the same name by Graham Greene. Commissioned by Houston Grand Opera. Revised in 2004–2005.
Opera	2005	At the Statue of Venus	Libretto by Terrence McNally	A musical scene for soprano and piano	Commissioned by Opera Colorado.
Opera	2006	To Hell and Back	Libretto by Gene Scheer	An opera in one act for soprano, Broadway soprano and period instrument orchestra	Commissioned by Philharmonia Baroque Orchestra.
Opera	2008	Three Decembers	Libretto by Gene Scheer	An opera in one act	Based on Terrence McNally’s original script, "Some Christmas Letters." Commissioned by the Houston Grand Opera and co-commissioned by the San Francisco Opera in association with Cal Performances at UC Berkeley.
Opera	2010	Moby-Dick	Libretto by Gene Scheer	An opera in two acts	Based on the novel of the same name by Herman Melville. Commissioned by Dallas Opera, San Francisco Opera, Calgary Opera, San Diego Opera and the State Opera of South Australia.
Opera	2012	Another Sunrise	Libretto by Gene Scheer	Dramatic scene for soprano, clarinet, violin, cello, bass, and piano	Commissioned by Music of Remembrance (Mina Miller, artistic director)
Opera	2013	Out of Darkness	Libretto by Gene Scheer	Opera in three parts for soprano, mezzo-soprano, baritone, actor, with flute, clarinet, violin, cello, bass and piano	Opera in three parts: 1. Another Sunrise; 2. Farewell, Auschwitz; 3. For a Look or a Touch; Commissioned by Music of Remembrance (Mina Miller, artistic director). Each part received its premiere individually by Music of Remembrance.
Opera	2014	The Radio Hour	Libretto by Gene Scheer	Chamber opera for chamber choir, silent actress, flute, clarinet, alto sax, percussion, piano, violin, cello, and bass	Commissioned by Pacific Chorale, VocalEssence, Conspirare, and The Philadelphia Singers.
Opera	2015	Great Scott	Libretto by Terrence McNally	An opera in two acts	Based on an original story by Terrence McNally. Commissioned by Dallas Opera and co-produced with San Diego Opera.
Opera	2019	If I Were You	Libretto by Gene Scheer	An opera in two acts	Based on the novel Si j'etais vous By Julien Green. Commissioned by the Merola Opera program.
Opera	2023	Intelligence	Libretto by Gene Scheer	An opera in two acts	Commissioned by Houston Grand Opera.
Opera	2026	The Judgment of Paris	unknown librettist	An opera in one act	Based on The Judgment of Paris. Commissioned by Festival Napa Valley.
Vocal	1992	Trois poemes de interieurs de Rainer Maria Rilke	Text by Rainer Maria Rilke	For baritone and piano	1. Portrait intérieure 2. La porteuse de fleurs 3. Epilogue: C’est pour t’avoir vue; Unpublished.
Vocal	1995	Encountertenor	Lyrics by John Hall	For countertenor and piano	1. Countertenor’s Conundrum; 2. The trouble with trebles in trousers … (Pitch can be a bitch!); 3. A Gift to Share; Commissioned by Brian Asawa.
Vocal	1995	Three Folk Songs	Traditional	For mezzo-soprano and piano	1. Barb'ry Allen; 2. He's Gone Away; 3. The Leather-Winged Bat; Dedicated to Frederica von Stade.
Vocal	1995	I shall not live in vain	Poetry by Emily Dickinson	For mezzo-soprano and piano, and for mezzo-soprano solo with SA chorus, hand bells and piano	Song originally written in 1995, expanded and arranged for mezzo-soprano with SA chorus, hand bells and piano in 1998.
Vocal	1996	On the Road to Christmas	Texts by A.E. Housman, Frederica von Stade, John Jacob Niles, Emily Dickinson and Jake Heggie	For mezzo-soprano and string orchestra	1. The Night is Freezing Fast (A.E. Housman); 2. The Car Ride to Christmas (von Stade); 3. Good King Merrily on High (traditional); 4. I wonder as I wander (Niles); 5. The Road to Bethlehem (Dickinson); 6. And then the Setting Sun (von Stade); 7. Christmas Time of Year (Heggie); Commissioned by the New Century Chamber Orchestra.
Vocal	1996	My true love hath my heart	Poetry by Sir Philip Sydney	For soprano, cello and piano	Also arranged as a duet for soprano, mezzo, cello and piano.
Vocal	1996	Thoughts Unspoken	Lyrics by John Hall	For baritone and piano	1. A learning experience over coffee…; 2. You enter my thoughts 3. To speak of love 4. Unspoken thoughts at bedtime; Commissioned by Earle Patriarco.
Vocal	1997	Natural Selection	Poetry by Gini Savage	For soprano and piano	1. Creation; 2. Animal Passion; 3. Alas! Alack!; 4. Indian Summer – Blue; 5. Connection; Music and poetry composed for Nicolle Foland.
Vocal	1997	So Many Notes!	Text by Jake Heggie	For 11 singers and orchestra	Commissioned by San Francisco Opera to celebrate its 75th Season and the reopening of the War Memorial Opera House. Unpublished.
Vocal	1997	Paper Wings	Lyrics by Frederica von Stade	For mezzo-soprano and piano, and for mezzo-soprano and full orchestra	1. Bedtime Story; 2. Paper Wings; 3. Mitten Smitten; 4. A Route to the Sky; Commissioned by Frederica von Stade and dedicated to her daughter, Lisa Elkus. Orchestration commissioned by the Louisville Orchestra in 2000.
Vocal	1998	Before the Storm	Poetry by Judyth Walker, Emily Dickinson, Edna St. Vincent Millay and Dorothy Parker	For mezzo-soprano, cello and piano	1. Before the Storm (Walker); 2. It sounded as if the streets were running (Dickinson); 3. What lips my lips have kissed (Millay); 4. The Thin Edge (Parker); Dedicated to Zheng Cao. Three songs based on works written in 1986, revised in 1998.
Vocal	1998	Songs to the Moon	Poetry by Vachel Lindsay	For mezzo-soprano and piano	1. Prologue: Once More – To Gloriana; 2. Euclid; 3. The Haughty Snail-King; 4. What the Rattlesnake Said; 5. The Moon’s the North Wind’s Cooky (What the little girl said); 6. What the Scarecrow Said; 7. What the Gray-Winged Fairy Said; 8. Yet Gentle Will the Griffin Be (What Grandpa told the children); Commissioned for Frederica von Stade by MUSIC ACCORD.
Vocal	1998	Everyone Sang	Poetry by Siegfried Sassoon	For baritone and piano	Unpublished.
Vocal	1999	Song and Sonnets to Ophelia	Text by Edna St. Vincent Millay and Jake Heggie	For soprano and piano	1. The Spring is Arisen; Ophelia’s Song (Heggie); 2. Women have loved before as I love now (Edna St. Vincent Millay); 3. Not in a silver casket cool with pearls (Millay); 4. Spring (Millay); Composed for Peggy Kriha-Dye.
Vocal	1999	Patterns	Poetry by Amy Lowell	For mezzo-soprano, SSAA chorus and piano	Commissioned by San Francisco Girls Chorus to celebrate its 20th anniversary.
Vocal	1999	From Emily's Garden	Poetry by Emily Dickinson	For soprano, flute, violin, cello, and piano	Unpublished.
Vocal	2000	Of Gods and Cats	Poetry by Gavin Geoffrey Dillard	For mezzo-soprano and piano	1. In the beginning …; 2. Once upon a universe; Commissioned by Vija Nadai.
Vocal	2000	How Well I Knew The Light	Poetry by Emily Dickinson	For soprano and piano	1. Ample Make This Bed; 2. The Sun Kept Setting
Vocal	2000	Eve-Song	Poetry by Philip Littell	For soprano and piano	1. My name 2. Even; 3. Good; 4. Listen; 5. Snake; 6. Woe to Man; 7. The Wound; 8. The Farm; Commissioned by James Schwabacher.
Vocal	2001	The Starry Night	Poetry by Ann Sexton, Emily Dickinson, and A. E. Housman, with texts by Vincent van Gogh	For mezzo-soprano and piano	Commissioned for mezzo-soprano Kristine Jepson by Evolutions in Song.
Vocal	2002	A Great Hope Fell: Songs from Civil War	Texts by Maya Angelou, Paul Laurence Dunbar, Emily Dickinson, Stephen Foster and others	For baritone and chamber orchestra	Commissioned by the Eos Orchestra (Jonathan Sheffer, conductor) for baritone Gordon Hawkins. Unpublished.
Vocal	2002	The Deepest Desire	Text by Sister Helen Prejean	For mezzo-soprano and piano, and for mezzo-soprano and chamber orchestra	1. The Call; More is required; Love; 2. I catch on fire 3. The deepest desire 4. Primary colors; Commissioned by Bravo! Vail Valley Music Festival. Orchestration commissioned by the St. Paul Chamber Orchestra in 2005.
Vocal	2004	Some Times of Day	Text by Raymond Carver	For mezzo-soprano, violin, cello and piano	1. The Minuet; 2. Simple; 3. The Best Time of the Day; Commissioned by the Harmida Trio.
Vocal	2004	Winter Roses	Poetry by Charlene Baldridge, Emily Dickinson, Frederica von Stade and Raymond Carver	For mezzo-soprano, string quintet, wind quintet and piano	Prologue: Winter Roses (Baldridge) I. Two Birds: 1. The Wren (Baldridge); 2. The Robin (Dickinson); II. Three Shades (in memoriam C.v.S.): 3. A Hero (von Stade); 4. Sleeping (Carver); 5. To My Dad (von Stade); III. Looking West: 6. Sweet Light (Carver); Epilogue: Late Fragment (Carver) Commissioned by Richard and Luci Janssen for Camerata Pacifica.
Vocal	2004	Vanity (blah blah me)	Text by Jake Heggie	For soprano and piano, and for soprano, clarinet, cello, bass, piano and percussion	Commissioned by Carnegie Hall for Audra McDonald as part of a new cycle, “The Seven Deadly Sins” (also featuring compositions contributed by Michael John LaChiusa, Stephen Flaherty, Ricky Ian Gordon and others).
Vocal	2004	Grow Old Along With Me!	Poetry by Robert Browning	For baritone and piano	Composed as a gift for baritone Robert Orth.
Vocal	2005	Statuesque	Text by Gene Scheer	For mezzo-soprano and piano; also, with chamber orchestra accompaniment	1. Henry Moore: Reclining Figure of Elmwood; 2. Pablo Picasso: Head of a Woman, 1932; 3. Hapshetsut: The Divine Potter; 4. Alberto Giacommetti: Standing Woman #2; 5. Winged Victory: We’re Through; Commissioned by University of Kansas at Lawrence for mezzo-soprano Joyce Castle.
Vocal	2005	Here and Gone	Poetry by A.E. Housman and Vachel Lindsay	For tenor and baritone with violin, viola, cello and piano	1. The Farms of Home (Housman); 2. In Praise of Songs That Die (Lindsay); 3. Stars (Housman); 4. The Factory Window Song (Lindsay); 5. In the Morning (Housman); 6. Because I Liked You Better (Housman); 7. The Half-Moon Westers Low (Housman); Commissioned by Welz Kaufman and the Ravinia Festival for the Stearns Institute for Young Artists.
Vocal	2005	The Other Other Woman	Lyrics by Mark Campbell	For male voice and piano	From Songs from an Unmade Bed, a stage work that features 18 songs by various composers with lyrics by Mark Campbell.
Vocal	2007	Facing Forward/Looking Back	Poetry by Charlene Baldridge, Eugenia Zukerman, Raymond Carver, Armistead Maupin and Jake Heggie	For soprano and mezzo-soprano with piano	Commissioned by Welz Kaufman and the Ravinia Festival for the Stearns Institute for Young Artists.
Vocal	2007	Final monologue from Master Class	Text by Terrence McNally	For mezzo-soprano and piano	Composed for mezzo-soprano Joyce DiDonato to celebrate the 50th anniversary of the Merola Opera Program and to remember the late James Schwabacher.
Vocal	2008	Friendly Persuasions: Homage to Poulenc	Poetry by Gene Scheer	For tenor and piano	1. Wanda Landowska; 2. Pierre Bernac; 3. Raymonde Linossier; 4. Paul Eluard; Based on four transformative friendships and meetings in Francis Poulenc’s life.
Vocal	2011	Pieces of 9/11: Memories from Houston	Texts by Gene Scheer	For soprano, baritone and girl soprano (age 14–18) with flute, guitar, violin and cello	1. Prelude; Lauren; 2. Lessons; 3. Phone Calls; 4. That Moment On; 5. Beyond; 6. An Open Book; Commissioned by Houston Grand Opera.
Vocal	2011	A Question of Light	Texts by Gene Scheer	For baritone and piano	1. The Light of Coincidences (Magritte); 2. Eccentric Flint (Maya c. AD 600–900); 3. Yellow Flowers in a Vase (Caillebotte); 4. Place de la Concorde (Mondrian); 5. El Hombre (Tamayo); 6. Watch (Murphy); Commissioned by Dallas Opera in association with the Dallas Museum of Art for baritone Nathan Gunn.
Vocal	2011	The Years Roll By	Text by Charles Hart	For soprano and mezzo-soprano with piano	Composed for soprano Kiri Te Kanawa and mezzo-soprano Frederica von Stade.
Vocal	2011	The Breaking Waves	Text by Sister Helen Prejean	For mezzo-soprano and piano	Commissioned by Carnegie Hall for mezzo-soprano Joyce DiDonato and pianist David Zobel.
Vocal	2012	Farewell, Auschwitz	Texts adapted by Gene Scheer	For soprano, mezzo-soprano, baritone and piano, or with clarinet, violin, cello, bass, and piano	1. Prologue: For Maria; 2. Soldiers; 3. Diamonds; 4. In the Cards; 5. Irenka; 6. Miss Ziutka; 7. The Sun and the Skylark; 8. Farewell, Auschwitz; Commissioned by Music of Remembrance (Mina Miller, Artistic Director).
Vocal	2012	Camille Claudel: Into the Fire	Text by Gene Scheer	For mezzo-soprano and string quartet	1. Rodin; 2. La Valse; 3. Shakuntala; 4. La petite châtelaine 5. The Gossips; 6. L’age mûr 7. Epilogue: Jessie Lipscomb visits Camille Claudel, Montdevergues Asylum, 1929; Commissioned by San Francisco Performances.
Vocal	2012	Of Laughter and Farewell	Poetry by Vachel Lindsay	For tenor or baritone and piano	1. By The Spring, At Sunset; 2. Under the Blessing of Your Psyche Wings; Commissioned by Ravinia Festival (2012) and Opera America (2013).
Vocal	2013	From "The Book of Nightmares"	Poetry by Galway Kinnell	For soprano, cello and piano	1. You Scream; 2. In A Restaurant; 3. My Father’s Eyes; 4. Back You Go; Composed for soprano Lisa Delan.
Vocal	2013	For a Look or a Touch (song cycle)	Libretto by Gene Scheer	For baritone and piano, or baritone with flute, clarinet, violin, cello, piano	Originally commissioned by Music of Remembrance as a stage work, the song cycle version was created in 2013.
Vocal	2014	Newer Every Day: Songs for Kiri	Poetry by Emily Dickinson	For soprano and piano	1. Silence; 2. I’m Nobody! Who are You?; 3. Fame; 4. That I did always love 5. Goodnight; Commissioned by the Ravinia Festival in celebration of Dame Kiri Te Kanawa’s 70th Birthday.
Vocal	2015	The Work at Hand	Poetry by Laura Morefield	For mezzo-soprano, cello and piano; also for mezzo-soprano, cello and orchestra	Three symphonic songs based on poetry by the late Laura Morefield (1961–2011). Commissioned for mezzo-soprano Jamie Barton and cellist Anne Martindale Williams by Carnegie Hall and the Pittsburgh Symphony.
Orchestral	2001	"Cut Time" Variations		For piano and chamber orchestra	Commissioned by the Eos Orchestra (Jonathan Sheffer, conductor) for pianist Jeremy Denk.
Orchestral	2002	Orchestral episodes from Dead Man Walking		For full orchestra	Commissioned by the Dallas Symphony (Andrew Litton, music director).
Orchestral	2002	Holy the Firm: an essay for cello and orchestra	Inspired by the novel of the same name by Annie Dillard	For solo cello and orchestra	Commissioned by the Oakland East Bay Symphony (Michael Morgan, conductor) for Emil Miland, cellist.
Orchestral	2013	Ahab Symphony	Texts by Herman Melville (from "Moby-Dick") and W.H. Auden (from his poem, “Herman Melville”)	For tenor solo, SATB choir and full orchestra	Commissioned by the University of North Texas.
Choral	1987	Faith Disquiet	Poetry by Emily Dickinson	For SATB Chorus (a cappella)	1. “Why do I love” You, Sir?; 2. What if I say I shall not wait!; 3. If you were coming in the fall; Commissioned by the UCLA Choir (William Hatcher, conductor).
Choral	1999	Anna Madrigal Remembers	Text by Armistead Maupin	For mezzo-soprano and 12 solo male voices	Commissioned by Chanticleer. Unpublished.
Choral	2001	My Grandmother's Love Letters	Poetry by Hart Crane	For SATB Chorus and orchestra	Commissioned by the Choral Arts Society of Philadelphia (Donald Nally, artistic director).
Choral	2003	He will gather us around from Dead Man Walking	Libretto by Terrence McNally	For SATB Chorus (a cappella)	An arrangement of the original hymn tune from the opera, Dead Man Walking.
Choral	2006	Seeking Higher Ground: Bruce Springsteen Rocks New Orleans, April 30, 2006	Text by Sister Helen Prejean	For double SATB chorus with full orchestra	Commissioned by Pacific Chorale.
Choral	2011	A Hundred Thousand Stars from A Look or a Touch	Text by Gene Scheer	For TTBB Chorus and piano, or with flute, clarinet, violin, cello, and piano	This chorus was added to For a Look or a Touch when the original stage work was expanded for the Seattle Men’s Chorus in 2011.
Choral	2012	Six Christmas Traditions	Lyrics by Mark Campbell	For SATB choir with piano, flute and oboe	Commissioned by Renaissance City Choirs (Pittsburgh, PA).
Choral	2013	For a Look or a Touch (choral)	Libretto by Gene Scheer	For baritone, men’s chorus, actor, flute, clarinet, violin, cello, piano and percussion	Originally commissioned by Music of Remembrance, this second incarnation was commissioned by the Seattle Men’s Chorus and The Boston Gay Men’s Chorus.
Choral	2013	The Narrow Bridge	Text by Pamela Stewart	For TTBB Chorus	Final movement of Tyler's Suite, featuring compositions by Nolan Gasser, Stephen Schwartz, Ann Hampton Callaway, John Corigliano, John Bucchino, and Lance Horne. Commissioned by the San Francisco Gay Men’s Chorus.
Choral	2015	Stop This Day and Night with Me	Poetry from Walt Whitman’s "Leaves of Grass"	For SATB chorus (a cappella)	Composed for The King’s Singers as The Raymond W. Brock Commission for the American Choral Directors Association.
Instrumental	1982	Indiana Bound		For piano	Unpublished.
Instrumental	1983	Inishfallen		Suite for piano	Unpublished.
Instrumental	1984	Lugalla		For string quartet	Unpublished.
Instrumental	1985	Glengariff Trio		For violin, cello and piano	Unpublished.
Instrumental	1985	Inishfree		For two pianos	Unpublished.
Instrumental	1986	Skellig Variations		For two pianos	Unpublished.
Instrumental	1987	Rhosymedre		For two pianos	Unpublished.
Instrumental	1988	One Day at the Duck Pond: illustrations with music to write stories to (children's book)	Drawings and music by Jake Heggie	For piano	Unpublished.
Instrumental	1990	Divertimento		For two pianos	Unpublished.
Instrumental	1991	Christmas Nocturnes		For piano	1. Est is ein Ros’; 2. Coventry Carol; 3. O Come, Emanuel; 4. The Holly and the Ivy; 5. I Saw Three Ships; 6. I Wonder as I Wander; 7. Silent Night; Arrangement by Jake Heggie. Unpublished.
Instrumental	1996	Coward/Cabaret		For cello and piano	1. Mad About the Boy; 2. Someday I’ll Find You; 3. Meme les anges; Music by Noël Coward, arrangement by Jake Heggie. Unpublished.
Instrumental	2010	Fury of Light	Inspired by Mary Oliver's poem, Sunrise	For flute and piano; also for flute and chamber orchestra	Commissioned for flutist Carol Wincenc by Linda & Stuart Nelson. Orchestration created in 2010.
Instrumental	2012	Orcas Island Ferry		Suite for violin/viola and piano	1. Crossing; 2. On and Off; 3. The Shoreline Lullabye; 4. Whistling and Listening; 5. In Tows and Threes (Motor Rhythm); Commissioned by the Orcas Island Chamber Music Festival.
Instrumental	2012	Soliloquy		For flute and piano	A setting of the song Beyond (from Pieces of 9/11) commissioned by Camerata Pacifica (Adrian Spence, artistic director).
