= Jamie Barton (singer) =

American mezzo-soprano

- Born: October 17, 1981 (age 44); Rome, Georgia, U.S.
- Education: Shorter College; Indiana University Jacobs School of Music
- Occupation: Singer (mezzo-soprano)
- Years active: 2007–present

Jamie Barton (born October 17, 1981) is an American mezzo-soprano. She won the BBC Cardiff Singer of the World competition (both Main and Song Prizes) in June 2013. She is also the winner of the 2015 Richard Tucker Award.

== Early life and education ==
Barton was born in Rome, Georgia. Her parents are Jim Barton and Robin Fox. She first performed when she was six years old, singing "Tender Shepherd" from the 1954 musical Peter Pan at a talent show at the Armuchee Elementary School.

She attended Armuchee High School, obtained a bachelor's degree from Shorter College and pursued a master's degree from Indiana University Jacobs School of Music, both degrees in voice performance.

In the summers of 2006 and 2007, Barton was a Gerdine Young Artist at the Opera Theatre of Saint Louis and a Fellow in Vocal Studies at the Tanglewood Music Center. In April 2007, Barton, along with five other singers, won the Metropolitan Opera National Council Auditions.

== Career ==
In summer 2007, Barton made her professional operatic debut singing the role of Annina, the maid, in Verdi's La traviata at the Opera Theatre of Saint Louis.

In July 2008, Barton sang as the Witch in Humperdinck's Hansel and Gretel at the Aspen Music Festival; one critic described Barton's performance as coming "close to stealing the show with her over-the-top witch."

In the 2008/09 season, Barton, a graduate of the Houston Grand Opera Studio, sang three times with the Houston Grand Opera, as Ursula in Berlioz's Béatrice et Bénédict, as Giovanna in Verdi's Rigoletto, and as Mrs. Ronaldson in the world premiere of André Previn's Brief Encounter.

In the 2009/2010 season, she debuted at the Metropolitan Opera in the role of the Second Lady in Mozart's The Magic Flute. She also sang for the first time with the Canadian Opera Company as Emilia, Desdemona's maid, in Verdi's Otello.

In 2011, Barton performed the role of Mère Marie in Poulenc's Dialogues of the Carmelites at the Bavarian State Opera in Munich. Also in 2011, Barton debuted with the Lyric Opera of Chicago. She sang three roles: the Voice of the Mother in Offenbach's The Tales of Hoffmann, the Nurse in Mussorgsky's Boris Godunov, and the Dryade in Richard Strauss's Ariadne auf Naxos.

In summer 2012, she sang again with the Bavarian State Opera at the Munich Opera Festival, singing the role of the Second Norn in Richard Wagner's Götterdämmerung.

On June 21, 2013, Barton won both the main prize and the song prize at the BBC Cardiff Singer of the World competition. She won the primary competition two days after winning the song prize. This made her the second person in the history of the competition to win both prizes, after Romanian tenor Marius Brenciu did so in 2001.

In 2018 she was the vocal soloist for the BBC Last Night of the Proms in the Royal Albert Hall.

She is represented by Columbia Artists Management and Verismo Communications.

== Critical reception ==
The Guardian reviewing the 2013 Cardiff Singer of the World results: "She is a great artist, no question, with an imperturbable steadiness of tone, and a nobility of utterance that invites comparison not so much with her contemporaries as with mid-20th century greats such as Kirsten Flagstad and Karin Branzell...her performance of Unbewegte Laue Luft, marked her out as one of the great Brahms interpreters of our times."

In 2012, Opera News described Barton as a "rising star" with a "sumptuous voice".

In a review of a recital at the Kennedy Center in 2009, Anne Midgette said that Barton had a "big voice" and "sang very well" but "showed [a] penchant for mugging".

In May 2015, Musical Toronto wrote about Barton's singing in Verdi's Requiem with the Toronto Symphony Orchestra: "Jamie Barton’s gleaming mezzo and exemplary legato was such a pleasure – no wonder she took Cardiff! Her Liber Scriptus, Quid sum miser, and Lux Eterna were all amazing. She was not afraid to use chest voice, but it was very musical and without vulgarity."

== Personal life ==
In 2014, Barton came out as bisexual on her Twitter on National Coming Out Day.

== Recordings ==
- André Previn- Brief Encounter – Elizabeth Futral (soprano); Nathan Gunn (baritone ); Jamie Barton (mezzo); Kim Josephson (baritone). Houston Grand Opera; Patrick Summers (conductor). Label: Deutsche Grammophon. Released May 2011.
- Dominico Scarlatti – La Dirindina – Ars Lyrica Houston; Brian Shurcliffe (baritone); Jamie Barton (mezzo); Joseph Gaines (tenor). Label: Sono Luminus. Released August 2012.
- Peter Ash-The Golden Ticket – Benjamin Wenzelberg (treble); Jamie Barton (mezzo); Jason Hardy (bass); Gerald Thompson (countertenor); Daniel Okulitch (Baritone); Atlanta Opera; Peter Ash (conductor). Label: Albany Records. Released December 2012.
- An Aids Quilt Songbook: Sing for Hope – Yo Yo Ma (cello); Jamie Barton (mezzo); Joyce Di Donato (mezzo); Isabel Leonard (mezzo ); Sharon Stone (spoken word). Released November 2014.
- Holiday Harmonies: Songs of Christmas – Jamie Barton (mezzo); Maureen McKay (mezzo); Stacey Shames (harp); Essential Voices USA (chorus). Label: Sono Luminus. Released October 2015.
- All Who Wander – Jamie Barton (mezzo); Brian Zeger (piano). Label: Delos Music. Released November 2016.
- Unexpected Shadows – Jamie Barton (mezzo), Matt Haimovitz (cello), Jake Heggie (composer). Label: Pentatone. Released September 2020.
