= Emily Pulley =

American soprano (born 1967)

Emily Ann Pulley (born 14 April 1967) is an American opera soprano. As of 2010, she had performed in more than 150 operas.

== Education ==
Pulley earned a Bachelor of Music degree, summa cum laude from West Texas A&M University in 1989 and a Master of Music degree in voice (with a focus on opera performance), in 1995, from the University of North Texas, where she studied with Pattye Johnstone. At West Texas A&M, Pulley had been a student of Elsie "Elsa" Ruth Porter (1920–2006).

== Selected productions ==
1. Peter Grimes (1995)
  Metropolitan Opera
2. La Fanciulla del West
  Glimmerglass Opera
  Title role
3. The End of the Affair
  Lyric Opera of Kansas City
  Pulley as Sarah Miles
4. 1600 Pennsylvania Avenue, (2008)
  Robert Bass, conductor
  Pulley was a soloist
5. The Turn of the Screw (2010)
  Pulley as The Governess
6. Three Decembers (2010)
  Central City Opera
  Pulley as Beatrice

== Selected discography, filmography, and videography ==
Live performances of the Metropolitan Opera

- Faust CD OCLC 55806273

March 29, 2003
Pulley as Marguerite

- The Merry Widow CD OCLC 79051606

January 27, 2004
Emily Pulley as Valencienne

- The Magic Flute CD OCLC 79308267

April 16, 2005
Pulley as the First lady

== Awards ==
- 2006 — Christopher Keene Award, New York City Opera, for a performance in new or unusual repertoire
