= Joyce Castle =

American mezzo-soprano (born 1939)

- Born: Lillian Joyce Malicky; January 17, 1939 (age 87); Beaumont, Texas, United States
- Education: University of Kansas; Eastman School of Music
- Occupations: Mezzo-soprano; Academic teacher
- Organizations: New York City Opera

Joyce Castle (born Lillian Joyce Malicky; January 17, 1939) is an American mezzo-soprano and voice teacher. She has had an international career in operas, musicals, and concerts that has spanned eight decades from the late 1950s into the 2020s. While her repertoire embraces a wide range of musical periods, she is closely associated with contemporary operas, often performing in new works or 20th / 21st century stage works. She was featured on the front cover of Opera Monthly magazine in November 1988. The accompanying feature article on her described her as a performer who "specializes in portraying nuts, mamas, lesbians, nymphomaniacs, witches, and men". Critical commentary of her career has emphasized her strength at embodying powerfully believable and widely diverse characters ranging from tragic to humorous with often scene-stealing impact.

Castle was born in Beaumont, Texas, and grew up in Golden, Colorado, and Baldwin City, Kansas. A graduate of University of Kansas and the Eastman School of Music, she began working professionally while studying at both institutions. Her stage debut was in Dallas in 1958 as a member of the chorus in stock theatre, and her professional opera debut in a leading part was as Lucia in Mascagni's Cavalleria rusticana with the Opera Theatre of Rochester in 1962. In the 1960s she was a regular performer with the Chautauqua Opera and Syracuse Symphony Orchestra, and was a member of the early music ensemble Ars Antiqua. From 1969 to 1973, she performed frequently with the San Francisco Opera's Western Opera Theatre, and in 1970 sang with that organization's main company as Siebel in Gounod's Faust in what was her first appearance with a major opera company in a leading role. She was married to the sculptor Wendell Castle, and later to tenor Bruce Brewer, in 1971. Castle and Brewer periodically performed together during their marriage, and moved to Paris, France in 1973. Castle lived in France for approximately ten years and worked in Europe as an opera and concert singer. She was a frequent performer in broadcasts of operas recorded for Radio France during this part of her career.

Castle returned to the United States and became a regular performer with the New York City Opera (NYCO) at the invitation of Beverly Sills. She sang with this company with intermittent regularity from 1983 through 2009, serving as the NYCO's leading character mezzo. She also performed with the Metropolitan Opera in many productions from 1986 to 1999. She has worked as a guest artist with many opera companies, mostly in the United States with organizations like the Seattle Opera, Glimmerglass Opera, Houston Grand Opera, Lyric Opera of Chicago, Washington National Opera, and Santa Fe Opera, but also abroad. In her later career she performed several roles with the Des Moines Metro Opera, most recently portraying the Countess in Tchaikovsky's The Queen of Spades in 2021 at the age of 82. It was the 140th role of her career. She taught on the voice faculty of the University of Kansas as a distinguished professor from 2001 until her retirement in 2023. She sang her farewell concert at the age of 84.

== Early life ==
The daughter of Beaumont Exporters pitcher George Malicky and Ethel Malicky (nee Reed), Lillian Joyce Malicky was born on January 17, 1939, in Beaumont, Texas. She sang her first solo at church when she was three years old and was taught to play the piano by her mother, beginning lessons at the age of 5. Because of her father's work as a baseball player, construction worker, and later in the oil industry the Malicky family moved around to different places in her early years. She spent three years in her early childhood living in Golden, Colorado.

The Malicky family moved to Kansas and settled in Baldwin City around the time when Joyce was a fourth-grade student in elementary school. In her teenage years Joyce studied singing with teachers at nearby Baker University and participated in music camp for high school students at the University of Kansas. In addition to singing she played instruments in school ensembles, learning to play the cello, tenor saxophone, oboe, and clarinet. She either placed or won regional music competitions, and gave a recital in Baldwin in 1957. In 1958 she won second place in the state music competition of the Kansas Federation of Women's Clubs. Her older sister, Georgann Raney (née Malicky), was also musical and became an organist. Her older brother Neal Malicky became an academic administrator at Baker University and president of Baldwin-Wallace College.

Joyce studied music and theater in the School of Fine Arts at the University of Kansas (KU), where she was a member of the Delta Gamma sorority. At KU she studied voice with Reinhold Schmidt and drama with Lewin Goff. In 1958 she performed in KU's productions of Rodgers and Hammerstein's The King and I (as Anna Leonowens) and Assunta in Menotti's The Saint of Bleecker Street. She was also a soloist in KU's presentation of Handel's Messiah. In the summer of 1958 she performed in professional stock theatre in the chorus of a series of musicals staged at the Dallas States Fair, among them Oklahoma! and Guys and Dolls. She later performed in the ensemble for a second season of musicals with this company. The Dallas casts included many well known stars of the period with Castle performing on stage with Shirley Jones, Jack Cassidy, Johnnie Ray, Frankie Laine, Burgess Meredith, Janis Paige, Jane Powell, and Marie Wilson among others.

In 1960 Joyce performed roles in several KU productions, including the prostitute Dol Common in the 17th-century play The Alchemist by Ben Jonson, Cleo in The Most Happy Fella, and Meg Brockie in Brigadoon. She toured in the latter KU production to Asia for performances of the show in Japan, the Philippines, Korea, Taiwan, and Hawaii. These performances were given for those serving in the American military and were sponsored by the United Service Organizations. She gave her senior recital as a mezzo-soprano at KU in April 1961, and graduated the following June with a Bachelor of Arts degree in voice and theater. She married sculptor and fellow KU student Wendell Castle in June 1961. The marriage did not last, and she married her second husband, operatic tenor Bruce Brewer, in 1971.

== Eastman School of Music ==
In the 1960s Castle pursued further studies at the Eastman School of Music at the University of Rochester where she was a voice student of Julius Huehn. She graduated from Eastman with both a Bachelor of Music (1964) and a Master of Music (1966) in vocal performance. She later studied lieder in Vienna, Austria in 1968 through a grant provided by the International Institute of Education, and continued to study privately during her career with Harry Garland in New York City.

In 1964 she was a featured soloist in a concert honoring Eastman's director, composer Howard Hanson, and that same year was appointed to the voice faculty of the Hochstein School of Music & Dance. In 1965 she portrayed Mistress Quickly in Eastman's production of Verdi's Falstaff; sang Mahler's song cycle Kindertotenlieder with Laszlo Halasz conducting the Eastman School Symphony Orchestra; and performed the world premiere of Frederick Koch's Astronaut with the Eastman Chamber Orchestra. She later performed this work with the Orchestra of America at The Town Hall in New York City in 1967. In 1966 she performed roles in two operas at Eastman: Mrs. Herring in Benjamin Britten's Albert Herring (with John Maloy in the title role) and the Third Lady in Mozart's The Magic Flute.

== Career ==
=== Early career in New York ===
Castle began her performance career in the early 1960s as a chamber musician while studying at Eastman. She was a member of the vocal group Ars Antiqua, a professional chamber choir based in Rochester, New York. With this group she was a featured performer in the 1962 production of the 13th-century mystery play Herod taken from the Fleury Playbook. That same year she sang in the chorus for a truncated version of Bizet's Carmen performed on CBS television for the program The Drama of Carmen with the New York Philharmonic and conductor Leonard Bernstein. She also sang in the chorus with the New York City Opera at New York City Center in this period which was her first professional work in opera, notably working with the company during its season of American operas.

Castle's first major role with a professional company was in 1962 with the Opera Theater of Rochester (OTR) when she replaced an ailing Gloria McMaster as Lucia in Cavalleria rusticana. Conducted by Paul Freeman with players from the Rochester Philharmonic, the production starred Eddy Ruhl as Turiddu and Charlene Chadwick-Cullen as Santuzza. After this she continued to perform with Ars Antiqua in performances of early music repertoire from 1963 to 1965. In the summer of 1964 she performed the roles of Berta in Rossini's The Barber of Seville and Marcellina in Mozart's The Marriage of Figaro with Opera Under the Stars in Rochester. The following Fall she portrayed the Guardian in OTR's production of Ron Nelson's The Birthday of the Infanta. In December 1964 she portrayed the role of Plentiful Tewke in Hanson's Merry Mount with the San Antonio Symphony under the baton of the composer for performances at the San Antonio Grand Opera Festival. The cast also included Chester Ludgin as Wrestling Bradford and Beverly Sills as Lady Marigold Sandys.

In 1965 Castle was the soloist in De Falla's El amor brujo with the Rochester Civic Orchestra coducted by Paul Freeman. She returned to Opera Under the Stars as Suzuki in Puccini's Madama Butterfly (1965) the Witch in Humperdinck's Hansel and Gretel (1965), Verdi's Maddelena in Rigoletto (1966) and Azucena in Il trovatore (1969). She was a resident artist at the Chautauqua Institution in the summers of 1965 through 1969 during which time she performed in concerts and on radio with the Chautauqua Symphony Orchestra. With Chautauqua Opera she portrayed The Princess in Puccini's Suor Angelica (1966), Mrs. Pearce in My Fair Lady (1966), Berta in The Barber of Seville (1966) Alisa in Donizetti's Lucia di Lammermoor (1967), Parthy in Show Boat (1967), The Duchess of Plaza-Toro in Gilbert and Sullivan's The Gondoliers (1967), Mistress Quickley in Flastaff (1967), Rebecca Nurse in Robert Ward's The Crucible (1967), La Frugola in Puccini's Il tabarro (1968), Nicklausse in Offenbach's The Tales of Hoffmann (1968), Zita in Puccini's Gianni Schicchi (1968), and Ruth in The Pirates of Penzance (1969).

In 1966 Castle was a district winner of the Metropolitan Opera National Council Auditions, and was appointed a resident artist with the Syracuse Symphony Orchestra (SSO) with whom she first performed in the fall of that year as the soloist in Kindertotenlieder with Karl Kritz conducting. In December 1966 she was a soloist in Handel's Messiah with the Rochester Oratotorio Society and the Rochester Philharmonic with fellow soloists including soprano Benita Valente and bass Malcolm Smith. In 1967 she appeared with the SSO in staged productions of Faust and Madama Butterfly. In May 1967 she was a soloist in both Bach's Magnificat and St Matthew Passion at the Rochester Bach Festival. In 1968 she performed excerpts from the title role in Carmen with the Rochester Philharmonic led by Samuel Jones, and performed the world premiere of Richard Bales' song cycle for orchestra and mezzo-soprano, A Set of Jade, under the baton of the composer at the National Portrait Gallery in Washington D.C. She repeated this latter work at Eastman's 39th annual Festival of American Music in 1969.

=== 1970s ===
In the 1969–1970 season, Castle portrayed the title role in Menotti's The Medium with the Western Opera Theatre (WOT) in a tour on the West Coast of the United States funded by a grant from the National Endowment for the Arts. At that time the WOT was the touring arm of the San Francisco Opera (SFO) and employed young professional opera singers full time in a repertory format. Other operas Castle performed in with the WOT in that season included H. Owen Reed's monodrama Earth Trapped, Gianni Schicchi, Mozart's Cosi Fan Tutti, and Puccini's La bohème. In April 1970 she starred in Robert Ward's The Crucible with the Anchorage Lyric Opera in Alaska which was a co-production with the WOT. In May 1970 she created the role of Bruneida in the world premiere of Ellis Kohs's Amerika which was staged by the WOT at the Los Angeles Inner City Cultural Center.

In the summer of 1970, Castle performed as a soloist with the San Francisco Pops under Arthur Fiedler; was the featured vocalist at an Independence Day celebration at Candlestick Park where she sang to a crowd of more than 50,000 people; and performed in the American Conservatory Theater's production of Shakespeare's The Tempest in which she was a featured singer as well as one of the spirits in Act IV. In November 1970 she made her debut with the main company of the San Francisco Opera as a last minute replacement for Sylvia Anderson in the role of Siebel in Charles Gounod's Faust. She then returned to the WOT for the 1970–1971 season, portraying Tisbe in Rossini's La Cenerentola and further performances of The Medium. In April 1971 she performed Marcellina in The Marriage of Figaro with the Sacramento Symphony, baritone Timothy Nolen as Count Almaviva, and Philip Booth as Figaro. In the summer of 1971 she portrayed Bessie in Kurt Weill's Mahagonny-Songspiel at the Tanglewood Music Festival (TMF).

Castle spent seven years performing with opera companies in France during the 1970s. By 1973 she was living in Paris with her husband when not traveling to perform. With the Orchestre philharmonique de Radio France she made recordings of Verdi's Oberto and Riccardo Zandonai's Francesca da Rimini in the mid 1970s. She performed frequently on Radio France in the 1970s and 1980s.

While living in France, Castle also appeared occasionally in the US. She returned to the TMF in 1972 as Ottavia in Monteverdi's L'incoronazione di Poppea, and that same year portrayed Leokadja Begbick in Weill's Rise and Fall of the City of Mahagonny with the Opera Society of Washington at the Kennedy Center. She repeated that role at the Skylight Opera Theatre (1973) and many years later with Opera Boston (2007). In 1973 she returned to the San Antonio Grand Opera Festival where she played both Flora Bervoix and Annina in a production of Verdi's La traviata starring Beverly Sills as Violetta and John Stewart as Alfredo. In August 1973 she portrayed Jenny in the WOT's production of The Threepenny Opera, and the following year appeared in this same opera in the part of Celia Peachum at the Houston Grand Opera. In August 1975 Castle and her husband performed a recital of German lieder and art songs by American composers which broadcast nationally on the NPR program NPR Recital Hall. The couple gave a joint recital at Baker University in 1976.

=== 1980s to present ===
==== New York City Opera ====
Sometime in the 1980s, Castle moved back to the United States. Her marriage to Brewer ended in divorce prior to 1984. After this her career has mainly been spent performing with opera companies in the United States. While still living in Paris, she was hired by Beverly Sills as a member of the New York City Opera. She performed on and off with the company for the next 25 years in 21 roles in nearly 200 performances. In 1983 she performed in the NYCO's productions of Richard Strauss's Die Liebe der Danae and Lehar's The Merry Widow. In January 1984 she performed with the NYCO in a benefit concert given at Kean College to aid the Jersey Lyric Opera. This was followed by NYCO performances later that year as Suzy in Puccini's La rondine, The Third Lady in The Magic Flute, Berta in The Barber of Seville, Mercedes in Carmen, and Mother Goose in Stravinsky's The Rake's Progress. In the summer of 1984 she became the first woman to portray Mrs. Lovett in an operatic staging of Sweeney Todd, at the Houston Grand Opera, a role she repeated at the NYCO.

From 1984 through 1986, Castle periodically performed (and also recorded) the role of the Old Lady in the NYCO's celebrated production of Leonard Bernstein's Candide. In 1985 she returned to the NYCO as Lalume in Kismet, Tisbe in Rossini's La Cenerentola, Katisha in Gilbert and Sullivan's The Mikado, Fata Morgana in Sergei Prokofiev's The Love for Three Oranges, and Madame d'Urfé in Dominick Argento's Casanova's Homecoming. She appeared in the NYCO's 1986 production of Brigadoon (as Meg Brockie) as well as reprisals of some of her earlier roles with the company.

Other roles Castle performed at the NYCO included Babba the Turk in The Rake's Progress (1987), Lucia in Cavalleria rusticana (1987), Emma Jones in WeilL's Street Scene (1990), Wesener's Old Mother in Bernd Alois Zimmermann's Die Soldaten (1991), the title role in Gottfried von Einem's The Visit of the Old Lady (1997), and Madame de la Haltière in Massenet's Cendrillon (2007). In 1993 she created the role of Zeresh in the world premiere of Hugo Weisgall's Esther at the NYCO. In 1999 she created roles in the world premieres of two operas that were staged together as part of a trio of short works collectively known as Central Park that were co-produced by the NYCO and the Glimmerglass Opera. These included The Mother in Deborah Drattell's The Festival of Regrets and The Old Lady in Michael Torke and A. R. Gurney's Strawberry Field. This opera trilogy was filmed for PBS's Great Performances and co-starred Lauren Flanigan.

In 2011 Castle resigned from her position on the board of the NYCO in protest to the company's decision to leave Lincoln Center.

==== Metropolitan Opera ====
On September 22, 1986, Castle made her debut at the Metropolitan Opera as Waltraute as Die Walküre in the premiere of Otto Schenk's new staging of that work with designs by Gunther Schneider-Siemssen. She returned to the Met regularly for the next 13 years. At the Met she performed such roles as the Innkeeper in Modest Mussorgsky's Boris Godunov (1987); reprisals of Waltraute (1989 with Jessye Norman as Sieglinde and Christa Ludwig as Fricka; 1992 with Gwyneth Jones as Brunnhilde; and 1996 with Placido Domingo as Siegmund); Countess di Coigny in Andrea Chénier (1990); the Second Norn in Götterdämmerung (1990), Marthe in Faust (1990, with Neil Rosenshein and Diana Soviero); the Mayor's Wife in Jenůfa (1992, with Ben Heppner and Leonie Rysanek); Madame Larina in Eugene Onegin (1992, with Lyubov Kazarnovskaya as Tatiana and Jerry Hadley as Lenski); and Annina in Der Rosenkavalier (1991 & 1993). Her final role at the Met was as Mrs. McLean in Carlisle Floyd's Susannah (1999) with Renee Fleming in the title role and Samuel Ramey as Olin Blitch.

Castle's performances in The Ring Cycle as the Second Norn and Waltraute were filmed for television broadcast on PBS's Live from the Metropolitan Opera in 1990.

==== The Ballad of Baby Doe ====
Castle is well known for her portrayal of Augusta Tabor in Douglas Moore's The Ballad of Baby Doe, an opera she has performed in 17 different productions. She first performed in the opera as a student at KU in one of the minor roles. In 1987 she portrayed Augusta to Ruth Ann Swenson's Baby Doe at the Long Beach Opera. This was followed by the NYCO revival of the opera in 1988 which received significant attention because of Beverly Sills's attachment to the project and her close association with that opera. She reprised the role at the NYCO in their new staging of that opera in 2001 with Elizabeth Futral as Baby Doe. In 2006 she sang Augusta for the 50th anniversary staging of the opera at the Central City Opera, the company which gave the opera's world premiere in 1956. Some of the other companies with whom she has sung this role included Seattle Opera (1992), Cleveland Opera (1992), Indianapolis Opera (1994), and Chautauqua Opera (1996).

==== Santa Fe Opera, Washington National Opera, Seattle Opera ====
Castle has been a frequent guest artist with the Santa Fe Opera, Washington National Opera (WNO, and Seattle Opera. She gave her first performance at the Santa Fe Opera as Prince Orlofsky in Die Fledermaus in the summer of 1986, a role she later repeated with that company in 1988 and in 1992. She was also seen in Santa Fe in 1986 as The Anne who Strips in the U.S. premiere of Aulis Sallinen's The King Goes Forth to France. Other U.S. premieres she performed with the Santa Fe Opera included Krzysztof Penderecki's Die schwarze Maske (1988, as Countess Laura Huttenwachter) and Judith Weir's A Night at the Chinese Opera (1989, as The Mezzo Actor, a.k.a. The Chinese General). Her other appearances in Santa Fe included the Woman in the Crowd in Strauss's Friedenstag (1988), the Widow Zimmerlein in Die schweigsame Frau in 1991 Marcellina in The Marriage of Figaro (1991), Annina in Der Rosenkavalier (1992), and The Notary's Wife in Strauss's Intermezzo (1994).

In January 1986 Castle returned to the Kennedy Center to portray The Marquise of Berkenfield in the WNO's (then known as Washington Opera) production of Donizetti's La fille du régiment with Erie Mills as Marie. She subsequently performed with the WNO as Massenet's wicked stepmother to Frederica von Stade's Cinderella in 1988; Herodias in Strauss's Salome with Maria Ewing in the title role in 1990; and The Old Baroness in Barber's Vanessa in 1995. She created the role of Alla Nazimova in the world premiere of Dominick Argento's The Dream of Valentino which was given by the WNO in 1994. That opera production was recorded for broadcast on NPR.

Castle made her debut at the Seattle Opera (SO) in 1990 as Mother Marie in Poulenc's Dialogues of the Carmelites with Rita Gorr as the Mother Superior. She subsequently returned to the SO as Mrs. Grose in Britten's The Turn of the Screw (1994), Fricka in Wagner's Das Rheingold (1995), Prince Orlofsky in Die Fledermaus (1999), the witch Ježibaba in Dvorak's Rusalka (2001), Herodias (2002), Mrs. Bertram in Jake Heggie's The End of the Affair (2005), Marcellina (2009), and the Marquise of Birkenfield (2013).

==== Leonard Bernstein concerts ====
Castle has frequently performed in concerts of music by Leonard Bernstein. In 1988 she performed as a soloist in the world premiere of Bernstein's Arias and Barcarolles. In 1992 she was a soloist with the New York City Gay Men's Chorus in an all-Bernstein concert. In 1997 she performed with Sarah Jessica Parker and Alison Fraser in a Bernstein concert at Symphony Space, She performed frequently with baritone Kurt Ollmann in recitals and concerts of music by Bernstein, including at the Ojai Music Festival (1998), the Tanglewood Music Festival (1998, with the Boston Symphony Orchestra) in Arizona with the Phoenix Symphony (1998), the Lied Center of Kansas (2001), and the Madison Opera (2003). In 2003 she sang an all-Bernstein program with Harolyn Blackwell, the Chicago Symphony Orchestra, and the Luna Negra Dance Theater. In 2008 she performed Bernstein's song cycle Songfest: A Cycle of American Poems for Six Singers and Orchestra at the Gettysburg Festival held at Gettysburg College. In 2018 she performed a program of music by Leonard Bernstein with the Desert Chorale in Albuquerque, New Mexico.

==== Other work ====
In May 1986 Castle performed György Ligeti's Aventures and Nouvelles Aventures with the New York Philharmonic at Avery Fisher Hall under conductor Zoltan Pesko. In 1988 she portrayed Mrs Lovett at the Arkansas Arts Center in Little Rock with the Arkansas Opera Theatre, and returned to the Houston Grand Opera (HGO) as both The Gingerbread Witch and the mother Gertrud in Hansel and Gretel. She returned to the HGO the following year to portray the society matron Mrs. Heimlich in the first fully staged production of Stewart Wallace's Where's Dick?, and to reprise her roles in Humperdinck's opera. She later performed Humerdinck's witch with the Baltimore Opera (2000).

In 1990 Castle performed the role of Strauss's Herodias at the Calgary Opera with Donnie Ray Albert as John the Baptist and Mario Bernardi conducting, and co-starred with Philip Bosco and Debbie Shapiro in a concert version of Dan Butler and Donald Oliver's musical The Case of the Dead Flamingo Dancer to raise funds for ACT UP to address the AIDS pandemic. In 1991 she reprised the role of Mrs. Lovett with the Anchorage Opera and portrayed multiple roles in Puccini's Il trittico (Frugola, an Old Nun and Zita) at the Dallas Opera. She later appeared in Il trittico at the Lyric Opera of Chicago (1996) and Chautauqua Opera (1997). In 1992 Castle was a guest soloist with the Parnassus Ensemble in a concert of music by Stefan Wolpe. In 1993 she performed Mahler's Rückert-Lieder with first the Allentown Symphony Orchestra, and later in a recital she gave at her alma mater, the Eastman School of Music, with pianist Barry Snyder.

In 1994 Castle performed Alfred Schnittke's Faust Cantata with Leon Botstein and the American Symphony Orchestra in what The New York Times described as a "graphically gory" performance that was the "height of anomaly". In 1995 she portrayed Ruth in the Vancouver Opera's production of The Pirates of Penzance, and performed the role of the Mother in Menotti's The Consul at the Opéra de Montréal. She repeated the latter role at the Berkshire Opera (1998) Arizona Opera (2005), the Glimmerglass Opera (2009), and Opera New Jersey (2011). In 1996 she performed the role of Madame Dilly in a semi-staged production of On the Town with the San Francisco Symphony and conductor Michael Tilson Thomas, later singing with that orchestra again in 2009 as Queen of the Fairies in Gilbert and Sullivan's Iolanthe.

In 1997 Castle returned to the Calgary Opera as Katisha in The Mikado; performed a Valentine's Day concert with baritone Kurt Ollmann and the Columbus Symphony Orchestra; and both performed and recorded the role of Madame Flora in Menotti's The Medium with the Chicago Opera Theatre. She later reprised this role with Opera Delaware (2004). In December 1998 she returned to the Lyric Opera of Chicago as Prince Orlofsky. In 2000 she returned to the Opéra de Montréal in Das Rheingold, and portrayed Madame Larina in Eugene Onegin with Utah Opera. In 2001 she performed a concert of Gilbert and Sullivan music with the Indianapolis Symphony Orchestra, and portrayed Queen Elizabeth I in Britten's Gloriana at the Central City Opera.

In 2002 Castle performed the role of Mrs. Sedley in Britten's Peter Grimes at the Teatro Comunale, Florence with conductor Seiji Ozawa. That same year she performed the role of Madame de Croissy in Dialogues of the Carmelites at the Glimmerglass Opera, a role she later repeated at the NYCO (2004), the Mannes Opera (2008), and the Northwestern University Opera Theater (2017). In 2003 she sang Herodias at the Arizona Opera; portrayed Prince Andronico in Handel's Tamerlano at the Spoleto Festival USA; performed the role of Bedronyi's wife in Brundibár at the Chicago Opera Theatre; reprised the role of Mrs. Grose at the Fort Worth Opera; and appeared at the Minnesota Opera as Serena Joy in the North American premiere of Poul Ruders's The Handmaid's Tale based on the novel by Margaret Atwood.

In 2004 she portrayed Yvette in Martha Clarke's Belle Époque at the Mitzi E. Newhouse Theater, and returned to Glimerglass as Lady Jane in Patience. This latter role notably featured Castle playing a cello solo on stage, pulling from her skills learned as a child. In 2005 she performed the role of Genevieve in Debussy's Pelléas et Mélisande at the French Institute Alliance Française with L'Opera Francais de New York, and reprised the role of Rebecca Nurse in The Crucible at Chautauqua Opera, a part she sang with that same company nearly 40 years earlier. In 2006 she reprised the role of the Marquise of Berkenfield at the Florida Grand Opera, and performed with Jake Heggie and the New Millennium Orchestra at the Chicago Cultural Center. In 2007 she portrayed Public Opinion in Offenbach's Orpheus in the Underworld at the Glimmerglass Opera; reprised the role of Mrs. Bertram at the Lyric Opera of Kansas City; and performed in a benefit concert at Skywalker Ranch to raise funds for Performing Arts Against AIDS.

==== Late career performances ====
In 2008 Castle performed Herodias at the Florentine Opera. In November 2009 she made one of her last NYCO appearances singing "I'm Easily Assimilated" from Candide in the concert "American Voices". In January 2010 she reprised the role of Mrs. Grose at the Boston Lyric Opera. Her career was profiled in the June 2010 issue of Opera News in what was described as the 40th anniversary of her performance career. That same year she performed the world premiere of William Bolcom's song cycle The Hawthorn Tree with the Orchestra of St. Luke's at the Morgan Library & Museum, a work which was composed for her. In 2011 she sang a program of music by Bolcom with the composer as her accompanist at the Modern Art Museum of Fort Worth, and returned to the Lyric Opera of Kansas City as the Marquise of Berkenfield.

In 2012 Castle returned to Central City Opera as Aunt Eller in Oklahoma!, and portrayed the oracle Sosostris in Michael Tippett's The Midsummer Marriage with Gil Rose and the Boston Modern Orchestra Project. In 2014 she portrayed Madame Armfeldt in Stephen Sondheim's A Little Night Music in a return to the Houston Grand Opera. In 2015 she performed the role of The Duchess of Crakentorp in La fille du régiment with the Pittsburgh Opera. That same year she performed the role of Grandmother Buryjovka in Leoš Janáček's Jenůfa with the Des Moines Metro Opera (DMMO). She has performed with the DMMO many times in her late career as Klytaemnestra in Elektra (2013), Madame Armfeldt (2017), as chef Julia Child in Bon Appétit (2019), and the Countess in The Queen of Spades (2021), the latter the 140th role of her long career.

==== Teaching ====
Castle has taught masterclasses at Sonoma State University. She taught on the voice faculty of the University of Kansas from 2001 until her retirement in 2023 when she gave a farewell concert. She was a distinguished professor of voice at KU. She performed in several events at KU during her time there, including singing at Murphy Hall's 50th anniversary celebration concert and giving the program "Joyce Castle: A Short History of a Long Career on the Stage! Part Two!" in 2008. When she was appointed to KU's faculty in 2001 the university commissioned Jake Heggie to write the song cycle Statuesque (with lyrics by Gene Scheer) for her to perform at an introductory faculty recital. She later recorded this cycle on the album Flesh & Stone.

== Partial list of recordings ==
- Joseph Fennimore: Eventide; 6 Songs; Inscape; Berlitz: Introduction to French (1989, Albany Records) – Joseph Fennimore (piano), Joyce Castle (mezzo-soprano), Karen Williams (soprano), Hillary Johnsson (mezzo-soprano), Philip Creech (tenor), Chelsea Chamber Ensemble, Timm Rolek (conductor)
- Chicago Opera Theatre: Gian Carlo Menotti's The Medium (1997, Cedille Records) – Lawrence Raphchak (conductor), Joyce Castle (Madame Flora), Patrice Michaels Bedi (Monica)
