= Music of Remembrance =

Classical chamber music ensemble

Music of Remembrance is a non-profit classical chamber music organization based in Seattle whose purpose is to find and perform music composed by victims of the Holocaust, irrespective of their background, as well as to perform related newly commissioned works.

== History ==
Music of Remembrance was founded 1998 in Seattle by Mina Miller, who is also president and artistic director, to find and perform music composed by victims of the Holocaust, irrespective of their background, as well as to perform related newly commissioned works.

The company presents two concerts each year in Benaroya Hall: one in spring to mark Holocaust Remembrance Day and the other in fall for the anniversary of Kristallnacht. They also give a free Sparks of Glory series of concerts with associated commentary at venues including the Seattle Art Museum and run an educational outreach program throughout Washington State. In 2005, they established the David Tonkonogui Memorial Award for young musicians. Since 2015, Music of Remembrance present a free community-wide concert at Benaroya Hall every January to mark International Holocaust Remembrance Day and the anniversary of the liberation of Auschwitz-Birkenau. Also since 2015, they have brought their programs to the Bay Area with an annual major concert in San Francisco.

The 2020–2021 season was disrupted by the COVID-19 pandemic, and replaced by a series of four online concerts.

Most of the performing instrumental artists are drawn from the Seattle Symphony. Seattle Symphony violinist Mikhail Shmidt, violist Susan Gulkis Assadi, and clarinetist Laura DeLuca have performed with Music of Remembrance since its founding. Flutist Zart Dambourian-Eby, violinist Natasha Bazhanov, cellist Walter Gray, pianist Jessica Choe, and double bassist Jonathan Green have made frequent appearances.

== Repertoire ==
Music of Remembrance's repertoire is made up of historic pieces by composers who perished in or survived the Holocaust and contemporary commissions that share lessons of the Holocaust.

The company's first recording, Art from Ashes – volume 1 (2002), included: Serenata, written in Terezín concentration camp in 1942, the only surviving piece by Robert Dauber who died in Dachau in 1945; Five Pieces for String Quartet (1924) by Erwin Schulhoff, who died in Wülzburg in 1942, and Herman Berlinski's Flute Sonata, lost when he left Paris and reconstructed in the USA in 1942.

Music specially commissioned by the company includes Camp Songs (2002) by Paul Schoenfield, five songs set to poems by Aleksander Kulisiewicz who was interned in Sachsenhausen concentration camp. This piece was one of three finalists for the Pulitzer Prize for Music in 2003 and was also on their first recording.

Music of Remembrance also commissioned three pieces by Jake Heggie: For a Look or A Touch (2007, for baritone and actor), about the persecution of gay men during the Holocaust; Another Sunrise (2012, soprano), based on the life and work of Polish resistance member and Auschwitz survivor Krystyna Żywulska and Farewell, Auschwitz (2013, soprano, mezzo-soprano, baritone), based on lyrics by Żywulska translated by Gene Scheer. Heggie incorporated these pieces into an opera in three parts, Out of Darkness (2013) with libretto by Scheer, of which Music of Remembrance presented the world première May 2016 in Seattle, with further performances planned for San Francisco.

The company's presentations also include more established music, such as Different Trains (1988) by Steve Reich, which compares his experiences of travelling by train in America with the very different experiences of being transported to a concentration camp in Nazi-occupied Europe, and Verklärte Nacht (1899) by Arnold Schoenberg, who recognised the Nazi danger early and emigrated to America in 1934. This was the music for the world première of Donald Byrd's dances Transfigured Night performed by Spectrum Dance Theatre.

== Discography ==
Music of Remembrance's first CD was on the Innova label. Since then, they have recorded several CDs for Naxos.

Audio CDs
| Year | Title | Record label |
|---|---|---|
| 2001 | Art From Ashes | Innova |
| 2004 | Letter to Warsaw | Naxos |
| 2006 | Brundibár | Naxos |
| 2008 | For a Look or a Touch | Naxos |
| 2009 | Camp Songs & Ghetto Songs | Naxos |
| 2011 | Vedem | Naxos |
| 2014 | Out of Darkness | Naxos |
| 2016 | After Life | Naxos |
| 2020 | The Parting | Naxos |

DVDs
| Year | Title |
|---|---|
| 2008 | Unsilenced |
| 2010 | The Boys of Terezín |
| 2015 | Out of Darkness |
| 2018 | Hear Our Story Now |

== Commissions ==
Music of Remembrance commissions Holocaust-inspired works by living composers to build a bridge between Holocaust musicians and a new generation of artists and audiences. These new works are intended to embrace the Holocaust’s legacy of spiritual resistance through music, and of communicating this legacy to audiences in today’s world.

Music
| World première | Title | Composer | Description | Instrumentation |
|---|---|---|---|---|
| 2000 | A Vanished World | David Stock | A snapshot of the pre-war world of East European Jewry, living on the edge of the abyss. | Flute, viola, harp |
| 2002 | Camp Songs | Paul Schoenfield | Musical setting of five poems written in Sachsenhausen concentration camp compiled by Aleksander Kulisiewicz. | Mezzo-soprano, baritone, clarinet, violin, cello, double bass, piano |
| 2003 | Fathers | Lori Laitman | Musical setting of Holocaust related poems by Anne Ranasinghe and David Vogel that focus on father-child relationships. | Baritone, violin, cello, piano |
| 2004 | Letters to Warsaw | Thomas Pasatieri | Musical setting of six texts by Pola Braun written in the Warsaw Ghetto and Majdanek concentration camp. | Soprano, piano |
| 2005 | The Seed of a Dream | Lori Laitman | Musical setting of poems from the Vilna Ghetto by Abraham Sutzkever. | Mezzo-soprano, cello, piano |
| 2005 | In Memoriam | Gerard Schwarz | A musical tribute to cellist David Tonkonogui, a teacher of Schwarz’s son Julian. | Solo cello, string quartet |
| 2007 | For a Look or a Touch | Jake Heggie | Duet between actor and singer based on the journal of Manfred Lewin written for his lover Gad Beck, who tells his story in Paragraph 175 (film). | Actor, baritone, flute, clarinet, violin, cello, piano |
| 2008 | Ghetto Songs | Paul Schoenfield | Based on the poetry in a notebook of Mordechai Gebirtig. | Soprano, baritone, clarinet, violin, cello, double bass, piano |
| 2008 | Rudolf and Jeanette | Gerard Schwarz | A musical tribute to Schwarz’s maternal grandparents, Rudolf and Jeanette Weiss, who were murdered at a concentration camp in Riga, Latvia. | Flute, oboe, bassoon, trumpet, horn, 2 violins, viola, 2 cellos, double bass, piano, harp, celesta |
| 2008 | Mayn Shvester Khaye | David Stock | Arrangement of the song by Israeli singer Chava Alberstein based on the poem written by Pole Binem Heller for his sister, who died in Treblinka extermination camp. | Mezzo-soprano, clarinet, string quartet |
| 2009 | Pictures from the Private Collection of God | Aharon Harlap | Song cycle based on the poetry of Yaakov Barzilai, a Hungarian Holocaust survivor. | Mezzo-soprano, baritone, oboe, string quartet |
| 2010 | Vedem | Lori Laitman | Based on the story of boys at Terezín publishing a clandestine journal Vedem. | Boychoir, mezzo-soprano, tenor, clarinet, violín, cello, piano |
| 2011 | Kolo't ("Voices") | Betty Olivero | Based on the history of Sephardic settlement at Thessaloniki and an anonymous poem from a resident who survived Auschwitz concentration camp. | Mezzo soprano, clarinet, violin, viola, cello, harp, percussion |
| 2012 | Another Sunrise | Jake Heggie | Song cycle based on the life of writer Krystyna Zywulska from an interview in Barbara Engelking's book Holocaust and Memory. | Soprano, clarinet, violin, cello, double bass, piano |
| 2013 | For a Look or a Touch (song cycle) | Jake Heggie | Based on the journal of Manfred Lewin written for his lover Gad Beck, who tells his story in the film Paragraph 175. | Actor, baritone, flute, clarinet, violin, cello, piano |
| 2013 | Farewell, Auschwitz | Jake Heggie | Based on Wiazanka z Effektenkammer by lyricist Krystyna Zywulska written in Auschwitz. | Soprano, mezzo-soprano, baritone, clarinet, violín, cello, double bass, piano |
| 2014 | In Sleep the World is Yours | Lori Laitman | Song cycle based on the poetry of Selma Meerbaum-Eisinger who died at 18 in a Nazi labor camp. | Soprano, oboe, piano |
| 2014 | The Yellow Ticket (arrangement) | Alicia Svigals | Film score for 1918 silent movie Der Gelbe Schein based on Abraham Schomer’s melodrama Afn Yam un “Ellis Island” and Aleksandr Amfiteatrow’s novel The Yellow Pass. | Violin, clarinet, piano |
| 2015 | After Life | Tom Cipullo | Chamber opera based on an imagined reunion of the ghosts of Gertrude Stein and Pablo Picasso as they discuss culpability of artists in WWII occupied France. | Soprano, mezzo-soprano, bass, flute, clarinet, violin, cello, piano |
| 2016 | Out of Darkness | Jake Heggie | A two-act opera. Act one, “Krystyna,” tells the story of poet Krystyna Zywulska in Auschwitz. Act two, “Gad,” imagines the renunion of homosexuals Gad Beck and Manfred Lewin torn apart under Nazi rule in Berlin. | 2 sopranos, mezzo-soprano, baritone, actor/baritone, flute, clarinet (Bb and A), violín, cello, double bass, piano |
| 2017 | Wilderness Mute | Keiko Fujiie | Song cycle based on eye-witness accounts of Atomic bombings of Hiroshima and Nagasaki. | Soprano, baritone, clarinet, violin, cello, double bass |
| 2017 | to open myself, to scream | Mary Kouyoumdjian | Multi-media work inspired by the life of Roma painter and writer Ceija Stojka who survived three concentration camps. | Clarinet, bass clarinet, trumpet, violin, cello, double bass, recording, click track, projection |
| 2017 | Snow Falls | Ryuichi Sakamoto | Text from a poem by Kiyoko Nagase about a mother visited by the ghost of her son lost in the atomic bombing with melodies from the film score to Nagasaki: Memories of My Son. | Narrator, violin, piano |
| 2018 | Gaman | Christophe Chagnard | Multi-media work based on the diaries of Takuichi Fujii and Kamekichi Tokita from their WWII incarceration at Minidoka Relocation Center. | Soprano, baritone, clarinet/bass clarinet, string quartet, fue (Japanese flute), taiko drum |
| 2019 | The Parting | Tom Cipullo | Chamber opera based on the life and work of Hungarian poet Miklós Radnóti set on his last night with wife Fanni before his WWII conscription. | Soprano, mezzo-soprano, baritone, flute, clarinet, violin, cello, piano |
| 2019 | Veritas | Shinji Eshima | Multi-media work with media projections by Kate Duhamel based on Vandalized Doors series by sculptor Al Farrow. | Cello, double bass, projection |
| 2019 | Passage | Ryuichi Sakamoto | Narrated poem by Kareem Lotfy with string quartet about an Arab Spring refugee. | Narrator, string quartet |
| 2020 | Stormy Seas | Sahba Aminikia | Musical portraits of 5 true stories of child boat refugees. Based on the book of the same name by Mary Beth Leatherdale and Eleanor Shakespeare. | 5 child singers, clarinet/bass clarinet, violin, cello, piano |
| 2021 | Return to Amasia | Eric Hachikian | Based on a grandson of the Armenian genocide searching for his roots. | String quartet |
| 2022 | Tres Minutos | Nicolas Lell Benavides | Chamber opera inspired by a real program that reunites families separated by immigration policies at the U.S. – Mexico border, but only for three minutes. | Soprano, tenor, baritone, clarinet, violín, cello, double bass, piano |
| 2026 | The Dialogue of Memories | Tom Cipullo | Libretto by Howard Reich with Tom Cipullo, based on Reich's account of his survivor mother's PTSD and his own interview of Elie Wiesel. | Baritone, mezzo-soprano, tenor, flute, clarinet, violin, cello, piano |

Choreography
| World première | Title | Choreographer | Composer |
|---|---|---|---|
| 2008 | The Wind | Donald Byrd | Franz Schreker |
| 2010 | The Dybbuk Suite | Donald Byrd | Joel Engel |
| 2013 | Zeks Yiddishe Lider un Tantz | Pat Hon | Betty Olivero |
| 2014 | Tap Dance | Donald Byrd | Dick Kattenburg |
| 2014 | Transfigured Night | Donald Byrd | Arnold Schoenberg |
| 2015 | La Revue de Cuisine | Olivier Wevers | Bohuslav Martinů |
| 2017 | Lullaby & Doina | Olivier Wevers | Osvaldo Golijov |

== Young Artist Award ==
In 2005, Music of Remembrance established the David Tonkonogui Memorial Award in memory of cellist David Tonkonogui (1958–2003). This is open to young musicians from the Seattle area who wish to perform music with a connection to the Holocaust. As well as a monetary award for continuing musical study, recipients are invited to perform at a Music of Remembrance concert.

Past Awards
| Year | Name | Instrument |
|---|---|---|
| 2005 | Julian Schwarz | cello |
| 2006 | Jocelyn Chang | violin |
| 2008 | Marie Rossano | violin |
| 2012 | Benjamin Shmidt | cello |
| 2013 | Takumi Taguchi | violin |
| 2016 | Evan Johanson | violin |
| 2018 | Kina Pak | cello |
| 2019 | Sophie Denhard | double bass |
| 2019 | Zoe Lonsinger | violin |
| 2020 | Julin Cheung | flute |
| 2021 | Leyna Kitahama | cello |
| 2021 | Tokuji Miyasaka | violin |
| 2022 | Seohyun Hwang | violin |
