= The End of the Affair (1955 film) =

1955 film by Edward Dmytryk based on the 1951 novel

- Theatrical release poster
- Directed by: Edward Dmytryk
- Screenplay by: Lenore Coffee
- Based on: The End of the Affair by Graham Greene
- Produced by: David Lewis
- Starring: Deborah Kerr; Van Johnson; John Mills; Peter Cushing
- Cinematography: Wilkie Cooper
- Edited by: Alan Osbiston
- Music by: Benjamin Frankel
- Color process: Black and white
- Production company: Coronado Productions
- Distributed by: Columbia Pictures
- Release dates: 24 February 1955 (London); May 1955 (United States)
- Running time: 106 minutes
- Countries: United Kingdom; United States
- Language: English

The End of the Affair is a 1955 British-American drama romance film directed by Edward Dmytryk, based on Graham Greene's 1951 novel of the same name. The film stars Deborah Kerr, Van Johnson, John Mills and Peter Cushing. It was filmed largely on location in London, particularly in and around Chester Terrace. The film was entered into the 1955 Cannes Film Festival.

== Plot ==
Writer Maurice Bendrix settles in London in 1943–44 after being wounded in the war. His affair with Sarah Miles, wife of civil servant Henry Miles, "grows into a deep and abiding passion." Maurice becomes jealous. He wants to marry Sarah, but she won't leave Henry yet.

Maurice's apartment is hit by a buzz bomb. He revives and pulls himself from the rubble to find Sarah kneeling on the floor. As she tends to his wounds, he asks her why she was kneeling. She says she was praying and was certain he was dead. She stares at him, her face wet with tears, then leaves abruptly. He runs after her, but finds the street empty. Maurice suffers from delayed shock and is bedridden for several days. When he recovers, he tries in vain to reach Sarah and his "jealousy turns to hate."

A year later, the war is over. Maurice struggles with his book and his hate for Sarah. One rainy night, he sees Henry. Henry is worried about Sarah and invites Maurice over for a drink. Sarah, who "is out at all hours," returns soaking wet, and is vague and detached with Maurice and Henry. Maurice confronts Sarah, who takes all the blame.

Parkis, a private investigator, reports to Maurice in the darkened flat. He describes Maurice's meeting with Sarah in detail, interpreting it as a final parting and describing Sarah as "looking ready to weep her eyes out." Maurice steps into the light and Parkis recognises him as the person he saw. Maurice says the parting was long ago. Parkis has the bottom of a discarded note in Sarah's handwriting that reads "Nothing matters except that we should be together, now and forever."

Parkis obtains Sarah's journal, observing that she appears to be very ill. As Maurice reads the journal, Sarah's voice is heard describing the past year. Maurice lies under the rubble. Sarah touches his hand, then returns to his room. Fearing him to be dead, she weeps, and prays: "I love him, I'll do anything... I'll give Maurice up forever, only just let him be alive!" Maurice calls her name. She plans to tell him about her "hysterical" promise, but then he seems to remember what it was like to be dead. "Now the agony of being without you starts," she writes. At home, Henry tells her that Maurice has been taken to a hospital with delayed shock.

Suddenly Sarah wants Maurice beside her. She confides in a Catholic priest and asks: "What does God want with me?" She lights a candle and for the first time in months feels "a little tremble of happiness." At home, she finds Maurice with Henry. It took "everything she had" to walk up the stairs. She writes a love letter, records it in the diary and tears it up, creating the scrap of paper Parkis found.

She tells her friend, Richard Smythe, she is going back to Maurice because she believes God will love her even if she breaks her vow. But when Henry tells her how much he needs her, she promises not to leave him.

The diary ends with a cry of pain and love for Maurice. He closes the journal and phones her. She begs him not to come. He pursues her to the church through pouring rain, promising they will be together.

Maurice goes to the house and finds Sarah has died. At home, he finds a letter from Sarah that says she can never see him again, and that she has never loved as she loves him. Maurice replies: "Have it your way, Sarah. I believe that you live and that He exists. But I'm tired. Just give me a little time..."

== Cast ==
- Deborah Kerr as Sarah Miles
- Van Johnson as Maurice Bendrix
- John Mills as Albert Parkis
- Stephen Murray as Father Crompton
- Nora Swinburne as Mrs. Bertram
- Charles Goldner as Savage
- Michael Goodliffe as Smythe
- Peter Cushing as Henry Miles

== Production ==
David Lewis bought the rights to the novel. He was going to set up the project with Louis B Mayer who had left MGM but this fell through and resulted in the project being delayed for three years. The movie was set up with producer David Rose who had a deal with Columbia. Deborah Kerr agreed to play the female lead. David Lewis wanted Richard Burton to play the male lead but Columbia did not want him. Instead Van Johnson, who wanted to play the role, was cast. " He was far from the Greene hero the film needed and I knew it," said Lewis.

Graham Greene wanted James Agee to do the script but the backers did not support this choice. The script was written by Lenore Coffee, who like Graham Greene was a late convert to Catholicism. She said:

I wrote a beautiful script; but they got somebody in England to rewrite it, and it wasn’t an improvement. I opened with the ending, the separation—after they had already stopped seeing each other—and then I backtracked to show what led to the separation. I reversed the order of the novel.

David Rose wanted Edward Dymtryk to direct. Lewis said "he wanted to do the film because he had had no success working with women and he wanted to prove that he could."

Lewis said "The film was well made, but at the last minute Rose and Columbia decided that the book’s “miracles” weresomehow beyond our audience, and they were summarily removed over my empathic objections. Their loss meant the loss of the film’s depth and uniqueness."

== Reception ==
The New York Times’ Bosley Crowther had harsh words for Lenore Coffee’s adaptation of the novel. “It is too bad the drama is so muddy, for the cast is good for this film. Miss Kerr is ideal for the lady and Van Johnson is apt for the man. Peter Cushing as the lady's cryptic husband and John Mills as a jaunty private-eye are also exceedingly potent in the only other fair-size roles. But the story just is not articulate, so no matter how diligently and well Edward Dmytryk has directed, it all comes out cluttered and cold."

== Release ==
=== Home media ===
This film was released on DVD on 16 May 2000. The DVD contains both the 1955 and 1999 adaptations of the novel, together with supporting material about their making.
