= Jake Heggie =

American opera composer and pianist (born 1961)

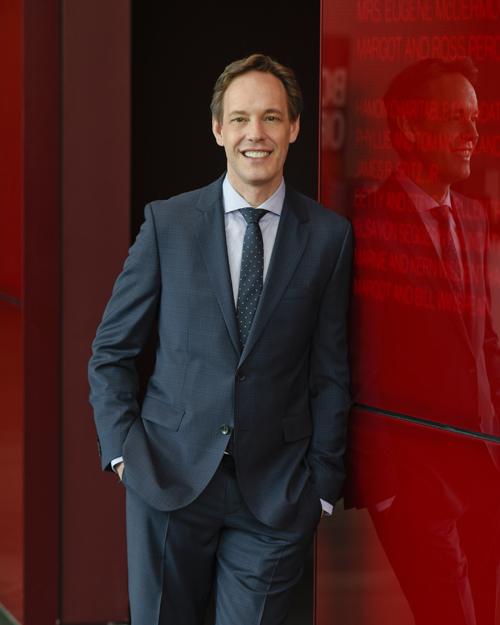
- Heggie in 2015
- Born: March 31, 1961 (age 65); West Palm Beach, Florida, U.S.
- Education: University of California, Los Angeles
- Occupation: Composer
- Works: List of compositions

Jake Heggie (born March 31, 1961) is an American composer of opera, vocal, orchestral, and chamber music. He is best known for his operas and art songs as well as for his collaborations with internationally renowned performers and writers.

== Biography ==
=== Childhood ===
John ("Jake") Stephen Heggie was born in West Palm Beach, Florida, to Judith (née: Rohrbach) and John Francis Heggie, the third of four children. His father was a physician and an amateur saxophonist, and his mother was a nurse. Shortly after Heggie's birth, his family relocated to Columbus, Ohio. He began studying piano when he was seven years old.

In 1972, Heggie's father committed suicide after a long battle with depression. Shortly thereafter, Heggie began writing music. A few years after his father's death, the family moved to the San Francisco Bay Area, where Heggie completed high school and continued his studies in piano.

=== Education and musical training ===
As a teenager, Heggie studied composition privately with Ernst Bacon from 1977 to 1979. After graduating from high school, he spent two years studying at the American University in Paris. He later continued his studies at University of California, Los Angeles (UCLA), where his teachers included Roger Bourland, Paul Des Marais, David Raksin, and Paul Reale. He graduated from UCLA with a Bachelor of Arts in 1984 and returned for graduate school from 1986 to 1988, where he won the Henry Mancini Award in 1987.

Heggie's most significant teacher during his studies at UCLA was Johana Harris, widow of composer Roy Harris.

"She was a magnificent teacher, a brilliant artist in every way, and she was nurturing and encouraging," said Heggie in a 2015 interview with Opera News. "She wanted you to have a broad recognition of what the world had to offer in literature, music, art, food, and daily life. She was all about unleashing inspiration, trusting instincts, opening up your heart and soul to possibility. And she saw something in me as an artist and as a composer that I didn't see or recognize in myself."

=== Early career ===
Upon graduating, Heggie and Harris toured the country as a performing duo until 1989, when Heggie started to notice pain in his right hand. These symptoms would lead to Heggie being diagnosed with focal dystonia, a neurological condition affecting a specific part of the body – in this case, Heggie's right hand – causing involuntary muscular contractions. Unable to continue playing the piano, Heggie pursued a career in public relations, working for the UCLA Performing Center for the Arts.

In consideration of Harris' failing health and Heggie's desire to relocate to San Francisco from Los Angeles, the couple made the mutual decision to separate but remain married. In 1993, Heggie moved to San Francisco, where he and Harris would stay friends until her death from cancer in 1995.

Heggie worked briefly as a public relations writer for Cal Performances at UC Berkeley in 1993 before being hired by San Francisco Opera the following year as the company's Public Relations Associate, a position previously held by novelist Armistead Maupin. After being hired, Heggie began composing again, and the focal dystonia in his hand lessened to the extent that he could begin rehabilitating his piano playing. His job at San Francisco Opera allowed him the opportunity to interact with key collaborators – including singers, conductors and administrators – who might be interested in performing his music and collaborating on future compositions.

In the fall of 1994, Heggie began a friendship with mezzo-soprano Frederica von Stade when she starred in the world premiere of Conrad Susa's The Dangerous Liaisons. On opening night, he decided to give her Three Folk Songs as a gift, and when Heggie visited von Stade during intermission, she was playing the arrangements at the piano. She became an enthusiastic champion of his work and suggested that they begin performing together in recital. In 1995, with von Stade's encouragement, Heggie entered the Schirmer American Art Song Competition and won with "If you were coming in the fall..." (text by Emily Dickinson).

Lotfi Mansouri, then the General Director of San Francisco Opera, asked Heggie at a cocktail party if he had ever thought about writing an opera. The next day he called Heggie into his office.

"I really thought it was going to be about a new press release so I brought my notepad," Heggie told the Nob Hill Gazette in a 2013 interview. "[Mansouri] said, 'We have an opening in the 2000 season, and I am going to send you to New York to talk to Terrence McNally because we've wanted to work with him, and I think you two would really hit it off and could come up with something amazing.' Everyone was stunned, but no one more than I – that he was offering a guy on his PR staff the chance to write a full-length opera, when he could have his choice of any composer on the planet."

At the close of the 1997 season, Heggie resigned from his position as the Public Relations Associate, and Mansouri named him the CHASE Composer-in-Residence for San Francisco Opera, a two-year position created especially for him so that he could write Dead Man Walking. The creation of Dead Man Walking would launch Heggie's international career as an opera composer.

== Career ==
=== Operas ===
Heggie is most known for his contributions to the American operatic repertoire. Hailed by the Associated Press as "one of the pre-eminent contemporary opera composers," he has seen his operas enter the standard repertory with the likes of those of such American composers as Carlisle Floyd, Gian Carlo Menotti, and Douglas Moore, as well as with those of his contemporaries. Heggie describes himself as a theatre composer who is concerned with "serving [the] drama" and "exploring character."

==== Dead Man Walking ====
Dead Man Walking, with a libretto by Terrence McNally, is an opera in two acts. Based on the narrative book by Sister Helen Prejean, it tells the story of a Louisiana nun who becomes the spiritual advisor to a convicted murderer on Angola State Prison's death row.

Commissioned by San Francisco Opera, the opera received its highly acclaimed first performance at the War Memorial Opera House on October 7, 2000, in a production that starred Susan Graham (Sister Helen), John Packard (Joseph De Rocher), and Frederica von Stade (Joseph's mother), with conductor Patrick Summers leading the San Francisco Opera Orchestra and Chorus. It was directed by Joe Mantello and designed by Michael Yeargan, with lighting by Jennifer Tipton and costumes by Sam Flemming. Due to popular demand, the original production of seven performances was increased to nine, most of them completely sold out. The original version of Dead Man Walking was revised during the East Coast premiere at New York City Opera in September 2002.

At present, Dead Man Walking has been seen internationally in more than 70 productions on five continents. It has received two live recordings: the first on ERATO of the original cast in 2000 and the second on Virgin Classics from Houston Grand Opera in 2011, starring Joyce DiDonato (Sister Helen), Philip Cutlip (Joseph), and Frederica von Stade (Joseph's mother). The creation of the opera was the subject of a documentary, And Then One Night: The Making of Dead Man Walking, which aired nationally on PBS in 2002. 'Dead Man Walking'is scheduled to have its Metropolitan Opera debut in 2021 in a new production by Ivo Van Hove, conducted by Yannick Nezet-Seguin.

Several productions of Dead Man Walking have been created, including a widely performed version by director Leonard Foglia with designs by Michael McGarty. The first European production was at the Dresden Semperoper in 2006, directed by Niklaus Lehnhoff and repeated at Vienna's Theater an der Wien in 2007. The Australian premiere at the 2003 Adelaide Festival featured the original production by Joe Mantello, while the Canadian premiere at the Calgary Opera in 2006 featured a new production by Kelly Robinson. Over the years, additional productions have been mounted by companies in Sweden, Ireland, Germany, South Africa, Montreal, and recently in the United States by Opera Parallèle in San Francisco, as well as companies in Boston, St. Louis, Eugene, Central City, Des Moines, and at the University of Michigan and Northwestern University. In 2008, a reduced orchestration was created for a production at the University of Nebraska–Lincoln. That orchestration was further edited in 2013 and is now widely used.

==== Other early operas ====
Again (with a libretto by Kevin Gregory) was commissioned and premiered by the EOS Orchestra in 2000, shortly before the premiere of Dead Man Walking. The opera involved domestic abuse and the four main characters from the television sitcom I Love Lucy. The context was that Ricky Ricardo had become physically abusive toward his wife, Lucy.

The End of the Affair, commissioned by Houston Grand Opera in 2003 with a libretto by playwright Heather McDonald, is based on the novel of the same name by Graham Greene. Set in London during and just after World War II, the opera tells the story of Maurice Bendrix, a writer involved in an illicit love affair with Sarah Miles, the wife of a public servant. During one of their trysts, an air raid occurs: a bomb explodes that destroys the house and knocks Maurice unconscious. When Maurice comes to, Sarah leaves abruptly and vows never to see him again. Obsessed, jealous and angry, Maurice sets upon a journey to discover what happened and why he was abandoned that day. The work received its premiere in March 2004 at Houston Grand Opera. The opera was extensively revised with additional libretto material added by Heggie and director Leonard Foglia. The revised opera was performed at the Madison Opera in 2005, with further revisions made by Heggie and Foglia that same year at the Seattle Opera.

In 2005, Heggie and McNally collaborated on At the Statue of Venus, commissioned by Opera Colorado to celebrate the opening of the Ellie Caulkins Opera House. Deemed "an operatic scene for soprano and piano," At the Statue of Venus is inspired by the great concert scenas of Haydn, Mozart, Beethoven, and Britten: an attractive woman waits in a museum by a statue of the Goddess of Love to meet a man she has never seen. Soprano Talise Trevigne has recorded the opera in its entirety, and its aria "A Lucky Child" is frequently performed in recital.

To Hell and Back was commissioned in 2006 by the Philharmonia Baroque Orchestra to celebrate its 25th season, and the 20th anniversary of music director Nicholas McGegan. With a libretto by Gene Scheer, the opera is based on the Greco-Roman myth of Persephone, the goddess of spring, who was abducted to the underworld by the god Pluto and must spend half the year with him there. Scheer based his text on the story as told in Ovid's Metamorphoses, formulating a modern tale inspired by the many versions of the Persephone myth and modern stories of spousal abuse. The opera was written for and performed by soprano Isabel Bayrakdarian and Broadway star Patti LuPone.

Three Decembers was commissioned by Houston Grand Opera in 2008. Originally slated to be a commercial musical theatre production with music by Heggie, lyrics by Stephen Schwartz, and a book by Terrence McNally, the story manifested on the operatic stage after Schwartz withdrew to collaborate with Alan Menken on the 2007 film Enchanted. Based on Terrence McNally's unpublished script Some Christmas Letters and with a libretto by Gene Scheer, Three Decembers tells the story of a famous stage actress and her two adult children over three decades of the AIDS crisis (1986, 1996, and 2006). Each year, they recall the events of a December as the characters struggle to connect when family secrets are revealed. Originally titled Last Acts, the opera was recorded live at the 2008 premiere and then revised. As of 2008, the revised work had not yet been recorded.

==== Moby-Dick ====
Upon its premiere, Moby-Dick was greeted with the most enthusiastic reviews Heggie had received since Dead Man Walking. D Magazine wrote, "a new chapter in opera history may have opened [with Moby-Dick]." The Dallas Morning News applauded the work as "a triumph."

Moby-Dick (2010) is an opera in two acts with a libretto by Gene Scheer based on the novel by Herman Melville. Set in 1820, it tells the story of Ahab, captain of the ill-fated whaleship Pequod, and the crew he commands. Having lost one of his legs to the white whale called Moby-Dick, Captain Ahab is obsessed with finding and destroying the beast at any cost. Only the ship's first mate, Starbuck, sees the deadly implications of Ahab's obsession.

Moby-Dick was commissioned by the Dallas Opera, San Francisco Opera, Calgary Opera, San Diego Opera, and the State Opera of South Australia. It received its highly acclaimed world premiere on April 30, 2010, at the Winspear Opera House in Dallas, Texas, as part of its inaugural season. Conducted by Patrick Summers and directed by Leonard Foglia, the production featured sets by Robert Brill, projections by Elaine McCarthy, lighting by Donald Holder, and costumes by Jane Greenwood. The cast included tenor Ben Heppner (Ahab), baritone Morgan Smith (Starbuck), tenor Stephen Costello (Greenhorn), bass-baritone Jonathan Lemalu (Queequeg), soprano Talise Trevigne (Pip), baritone Robert Orth (Stubb), and tenor Matthew O'Neill (Flask).

The 2012 production of Moby-Dick at San Francisco Opera was featured on Great Performances' 40th Season, telecast nationally in 2013 and subsequently released on DVD (EuroArts). That same year, Heggie & Scheer's Moby-Dick: A Grand Opera for the 21st Century, a book by Robert Wallace, with photos by Karen Almond, about the making of the opera was published by UNT Press. Moby-Dick received its East Coast premiere in February 2014 in a production by the Washington National Opera.

==== Recent operatic works ====
Music of Remembrance (MOR), a Seattle-based concert series founded by Artistic Director Mina Miller, approached Heggie in 2006 to create what would become a series of three one-act operas on themes of persecution during the Holocaust. The works, each with a libretto by Gene Scheer, are For a Look or a Touch (2007), Another Sunrise (2012), and Farewell, Auschwitz (2013).

For a Look or a Touch is a story about the persecution of gay men during the Holocaust. Scheer based his text on true stories told in the documentary film Paragraph 175 and the journal of Manfred Lewin, from the United States Holocaust Memorial Museum in Washington D.C. Heggie later adapted For a Look or a Touch for two other performing formats: a stage version with men's choir, and as a song cycle for baritone solo.

Another Sunrise is a dramatic scene for soprano and chamber ensemble (clarinet, violin, cello, bass, and piano) based on the life and work of Holocaust survivor Krystyna Zywulska.

Farewell, Auschwitz consists of seven scenes for soprano, mezzo-soprano, and baritone. The work exists in a chamber version for singers and piano, as well as in orchestration with clarinet, violin, cello, bass, and piano. In this opera, Scheer's lyrics are free translations of lyrics created by Krystyna Zywulska while she was imprisoned at Auschwitz-Birkenau.

Heggie and Scheer created a full-length opera titled Out of Darkness based on the three works they created for Music of Remembrance. The new opera received its premiere in Seattle in May 2016, followed by performances in San Francisco. At present, a recording titled Out of Darkness (Naxos) offers the original versions of Another Sunrise and Farewell, Auschwitz, as well as the song-cycle version of For a Look or a Touch.

In 2014, Pacific Chorale, VocalEssence, Conspirare, and the Philadelphia Singers commissioned Heggie and Scheer to compose The Radio Hour, a choral opera in one act. The opera focuses on an unhappy middle-aged woman disillusioned with her life and dully going through the motions of daily drudgery. Some of the choristers are the negative voices incessantly chiming inside her head, while others beckon to her from the radio. Singers even play the furniture in her room, with bodies constituting a chair, a lamp and a mirror.

Great Scott, with an original libretto by Terrence McNally, received its premiere at the Dallas Opera on October 30, 2015. In Great Scott, opera star Arden Scott returns to her hometown to save the struggling company that launched her career. The opening night performance of the long-lost opera she discovered falls on the same night as the home team's first football championship. The opera starred mezzo-sopranos Joyce DiDonato and Frederica von Stade, soprano Ailyn Pérez, baritone Nathan Gunn and countertenor Anthony Roth Costanzo. Great Scott marked the third collaboration between Heggie and McNally. The work was enthusiastically received and the Heggie received a 2019 Grammy Nomination for Best New Composition (Classical).

Heggie's 2016 operatic adaptation of the 1946 film It's a Wonderful Life was commissioned by Houston Grand Opera with a libretto by Gene Scheer. Based on Philip Van Doren Stern's story "The Greatest Gift" and made famous by the 1946 Frank Capra film, the opera follows the journey of George Bailey, a troubled banker about to end his own life on Christmas Eve only to be saved when his guardian angel helps him realize how many lives he has touched. It's a Wonderful Life had its world premiere December 2016 in the Wortham Theater Center's Cullen Theater. In 2017 PENTATONE released a live recording of the opera, performed by the Houston Grand Opera. Heggie and Scheer revised the piece following the premiere. It was subsequently performed to rave reviews at the San Francisco Opera.

=== Songs and vocal music ===
In addition to his expansive work in opera, Heggie has composed nearly 300 art songs with texts by both living and deceased writers.

Some of the writers featured in Heggie's compositions include Margaret Atwood, Maya Angelou, W.H. Auden, Charlene Baldridge, Mark Campbell, Raymond Carver, Hart Crane, Gavin Geoffrey Dillard, Emily Dickinson, Charles Hart, John Hall, A. E. Housman, Galway Kinnell, Sister Helen Prejean, Vachal Lindsay, Phillip Littell, Amy Lowell, Armistead Maupin, Terrence McNally, Edna St. Vincent Millay, Laura Morefield, John Jacob Niles, Dorothy Parker, Rainer Maria Rilke, Gini Savage, Ann Sexton, Gene Scheer, Frederica von Stade, Pamela Stewart, Sir Philip Sidney, Judyth Walker, and Walt Whitman, among others.

Heggie has also arranged a number of traditional American folk songs.

=== Orchestral and choral music ===
Many of Heggie's orchestral and choral work are inspired by literary works. These include Orchestral Episodes from Dead Man Walking (2002), commissioned by the Dallas Symphony; Ahab Symphony (2013), commissioned by the University of North Texas; and the choral work He will gather us around from Dead Man Walking (2003), an arrangement of the opera's original hymn tune commissioned by Wichita State University. Several of his song cycles – most recently, The Work at Hand (2015) – have also been orchestrated by Heggie for larger orchestral forces.

In 2002, Heggie was commissioned by the Oakland East Bay Symphony to compose Holy the Firm: an essay for cello and orchestra for cellist Emil Miland. The piece, a response to the terrorist attacks on the World Trade Center on September 11, 2001, was based on the novel of the same name by Annie Dillard.

=== Chamber music ===
Heggie wrote a number of instrumental works during his time as a student at UCLA. These include works for piano, string quartet, and instrumental solos, among others.

He has also arranged many folk songs and traditional hymns for solo piano or other instrumental configurations. One of his most performed arrangements is Coward/Cabaret, a setting of three cabaret songs by Noël Coward for cello and piano that Heggie frequently performs with cellist Emil Miland.

Two recent commissions for instrumental music include Fury of Light (2010) and Orcas Island Ferry: Suite for viola/violin and piano (2012). Fury of Light was commissioned for Carol Wincenc to celebrate her Ruby Anniversary and was inspired by Mary Oliver's poem "Sunrise." Orcas Island Ferry: Suite for viola/violin and piano was commissioned by the Orcas Island Chamber Music Festival for violist/violinist Aloysia Friedmann and pianist Jon Kimura Parker.

== Notable collaborators ==
Heggie frequently collaborates as composer and pianist with internationally renowned singers. These collaborators include:

- Sopranos: Cheryl Barker, Isabel Bayrakdarian, Marnie Breckenridge, Kristin Clayton, Lisa Delan, Nicolle Foland, Devon Guthrie, Kiri Te Kanawa, Peggy Kriha-Dye, Renée Fleming, Caitlyn Lynch, Sylvia McNair, Ann Moss, Leah Partridge, Ailyn Pérez, Talise Trevigne, Carol Vaness, Deborah Voigt, Lisa Vroman, and Regina Zona;
- Mezzo-sopranos: Jamie Barton, Zheng Cao, Catherine Cook, Sasha Cooke, Joyce DiDonato, Susan Graham, Jennifer Larmore, Sarah Larsen, Elise Quagliata, and Frederica von Stade;
- Countertenors: Brian Asawa and Anthony Roth Costanzo;
- Tenors: Jonathan Blalock, William Burden, Stephen Costello, Paul Groves, Ben Heppner, Jay Hunter Morris, Nicolas Phan, and Rodel Rosell;
- Baritones: Kevin Burdette, Philip Cutlip, Nathan Gunn, Michael Mayes, Daniel Okulitch, Robert Orth, John Packard, Keith Phares, Morgan Smith, and Bryn Terfel.

Heggie has also written for Broadway stars Patti LuPone (for whom he wrote To Hell And Back) and Audra McDonald (his song Vanity (blah blah me) was part of a song cycle commissioned by Carnegie Hall for McDonald titled The Seven Deadly Sins, which also features compositions by Michael John LaChiusa, Stephen Flaherty, Ricky Ian Gordon and others).

Stage directors who have championed his work include Leonard Foglia, Joe Mantello, Tomer Zvulun and Jack O'Brien. All of Heggie's major opera premieres have been conducted by Patrick Summers. He has also worked with conductors John DeMain, Joseph Mechavich, and Nicole Paiement. In addition, in 2025, he was appointed to the composition faculty at the San Francisco Conservatory of Music, as the Diane Wilsey Distinguished Professor of Composition, joining the composition faculty consisting of David Conte, David Garner, and Mason Bates.

== Personal life ==
Heggie was married to his former teacher Johana Harris from 1982 until her death in 1995.

Heggie married singer and actor Curt Branom in 2008. They currently live in San Francisco.

== Notable compositions ==
- Dead Man Walking (2000)
- The Deepest Desire (2002)
- The End of the Affair (2003; rev. 2004–2005)
- To Hell and Back (2006)
- For a Look or a Touch (2007)
- Three Decembers (2008)
- Moby-Dick (2010)
- Camille Claudel: Into the Fire (2012)
- Ahab Symphony (2013)
- The Radio Hour (2014)
- The Work at Hand (2015)
- Great Scott (2015)

== Awards, honors and distinctions ==
- 1995 Winner – Schirmer American Art Song Competition
- 2004 Maecenas Award (Pittsburgh Opera)
- 2005 Guggenheim Fellowship
- 2015 Eddie Medora King Award (UT Austin)
- 2015 Brock Commission

Artist residencies include:

- 1998–2000 San Francisco Opera CHASE Composer-in-Residence
- 2000–2001 EOS Orchestra Composer-in-Residence
- 2002 Vail Valley Music Festival Composer-in-Residence
- 2010–2011 University of North Texas Artist-in-Residence
- 2005 and 2012 Orcas Island Chamber Music Festival Composer-in-Residence

Additionally, Heggie has held guest artist residencies at Boston University, Bucknell University, Cornell, Royal Conservatory in Toronto, University of Northern Iowa, University of Colorado at Boulder, USC Thornton School of Music, and Vanderbilt University.

He has served as a guest faculty member for SongFest at the Colburn School and Vancouver International Song Institute (VISI).

== Publications ==
- "Jake Heggie: Composing Opera Today." The Oxford Handbook of Opera. Ed. Helen M. Greenwald. New York: Oxford UP, 2014. pp. 1089–111.
- Loudis, Jessica. "Jake Heggie, Composer." Should I Go to Grad School?: 41 Answers to an Impossible Question. New York: Bloomsbury, 2014. pp. 180–87.
- Wallace, Robert K., and Karen Almond. Heggie and Scheer's Moby-Dick: A Grand Opera for the 21st Century. Denton, TX: University of North Texas, 2013.

Heggie has three collections of songs published by G. Schirmer in 1998 to 1999 (Associated Music Publishers): The Faces of Love, Book 1 (soprano), The Faces of Love, Book 2 (mezzo-soprano), and The Faces of Love, Book 3 (medium voice)

All of Heggie's other music is published by Bent Pen Music, Inc. and represented by Bill Holab Music, Inc.

== Discography ==
- 1997 – My Native Land: A Collection of American Songs. Selected songs. Performed by Jennifer Larmore (soprano) and Antoine Palloc (piano). WEA/Atlantic/Teldec. Compact disc.
- 1999 – The Faces of Love - The Songs of Jake Heggie. Performed by Emil Miland (cello), Renée Fleming (soprano), Sylvia McNair (soprano), Jennifer Larmore (soprano), Frederica Von Stade (mezzo-soprano), Nicolle Foland (soprano), Zheng Cao (mezzo-soprano), Kristin Clayton (soprano), Carol Vaness (soprano), and Brian Asawa (countertenor). BMG/RCA Victor 63484. Compact disc.
- 2002 – Heggie: Dead Man Walking. Live recording of the world premiere of the title work by Jake Heggie and Terrence McNally. Performed by Susan Graham (mezzo-soprano), Frederica von Stade (mezzo-soprano), John Packard (baritone), and the San Francisco Opera Orchestra and Chorus (Patrick Summers, conductor). Alliance Records. Compact disc.
- 2002 – New Music for a New Century (Live at the Paramount). Live recording of world premiere of Holy the Firm: essay for cello and orchestra. Performed by Emil Miland (cello) and the Oakland East Bay Symphony (Michael Morgan, conductor).
- 2004 – Artist Portrait: Susan Graham. Excerpts from Dead Man Walking. Performed by Susan Graham (mezzo-soprano). Alliance Records. Compact disc.
- 2005 – The Deepest Desire. Works by Leonard Bernstein, Aaron Copland, and Jake Heggie. Performed by Joyce DiDonato (mezzo-soprano), Frances Shelley (flute), and David Zobel (piano). Eloquentia France. Compact disc.
- 2006 – Live recording of world premiere of "To Hell and Back". Performed by Isabel Bayrakdarian (soprano), Patti LuPone (mezzo-soprano), and the Philharmonia Baroque Orchestra (Nicholas McGegan, conductor). Available for download at Magnatunes.
- 2008 – And if the song be worth a smile. Works by Gordon Getty, William Bolcom, Jake Heggie, Luna Pearl Woolf, David Garner. Performed by Kristin Pankonin, Matt Haimovitz, Susanne Mentzer, Lisa Delan. PENTATONE PTC 5186099. Compact disc.
- 2008 – Jake Heggie: For a Look or a Touch. A recording featuring music of Jake Heggie, Gerard Schwarz, and Lori Laitman. Performed by Morgan Smith (baritone), Julian Patrick (baritone), and a quintet of instrumentalists. Naxos Records. Compact disc.
- 2008 – Flesh and Stone: The Songs of Jake Heggie. Performed by Frederica von Stade (mezzo-soprano), Joyce Castle (mezzo-soprano), Zheng Cao (mezzo-soprano), and Mary Phillips (mezzo-soprano). Americus Records. Compact disc.
- 2008 – Three Decembers. Performed by Kristin Clayton (soprano), Frederica von Stade (mezzo-soprano), and Keith Phares (baritone). Live recording of world premiere at Houston Grand Opera. Albany Records. Compact disc.
- 2009 – Cheryl Barker sings Great Operatic Arias. Excerpts from The End of the Affair. Performed by Cheryl Barker (soprano) and the London Philharmonic Orchestra (David Parry, conductor). Alliance Records. Compact disc.
- 2010 – Passing By: Songs by Jake Heggie. Performed by Isabel Bayrakdarian (soprano), Zheng Cao (mezzo-soprano), Joyce DiDonato (mezzo-soprano), Susan Graham (mezzo-soprano), Frederica von Stade (mezzo-soprano), Paul Groves (tenor), Baritone Keith Phares (baritone), Dawn Harms (violin), Carla Maria Rodrigues (viola), Emil Miland (cello), and Jake Heggie (piano). Avie Records. Compact disc.
- 2012 – Heggie: Dead Man Walking. Live recording of the 2011 Houston Grand Opera production of the title work by Jake Heggie and Terrence McNally. Performed by Joyce DiDonato (mezzo-soprano), Frederica von Stade (mezzo-soprano), Philip Cutlip (baritone), and the Houston Grand Opera Orchestra and Chorus (Patrick Summers, conductor). Virgin Classics. Compact disc.
- 2012 – Homecoming: Kansas City Symphony presents Joyce DiDonato. Live recording of The Deepest Desire. Performed by Joyce DiDonato (mezzo-soprano) and the Kansas City Symphony (Michael Stern, conductor). Available for download on iTunes.
- 2012 – Leah Partridge: Finding Home. Recording of songs by Jake Heggie, Ricky Ian Gordon, Ernst Bacon, Lee Hoiby, Libby Larson, and others. Performed by Leah Partridge (soprano). Available on CDBaby.com
- 2013 – Excerpts from "Dead Man Walking". Performed by Joyce DiDonato (mezzo-soprano) on Rejoyce! the Best of Joyce DiDonato. Erato/Warner Classics. Compact disc.
- 2013 – here/after: songs of lost voices. Performed by Stephen Costello (tenor), Joyce DiDonato (mezzo-soprano), Nathan Gunn (baritone), Talise Trevigne (soprano), Carol Wincenc (flute), The Alexander String Quartet, and others. PENTATONE PTC 5186515. Compact disc.
- 2013 – The Hours Begin to Sing. Works by Jake Heggie, John Corigliano, Gordon Getty, David Garner, Luna Pearl Woolf. Performed by Lisa Delan, Kristin Pankonin, Matt Haimovitz, David Krakauer, Maxim Rubtsov. PENTATONE PTC 5186459 Compact disc.
- 2013 – Ahab Symphony. Performed by Richard Croft (tenor), the University of North Texas Grand Chorus and the UNT Symphony Orchestra (David Itkin, conductor). University of North Texas. Compact disc.
- 2013 – Talise Trevigne: At the Statue of Venus. Performed by Talise Trevigne (soprano), Jake Heggie (piano), and Glen Roven (piano). GPR Records. Compact disc.
- 2013 – Lisa Delan: The Hours Begin to Sing. Works by Jake Heggie, John Corigliano, Luna Pearl Woolf, David Garner, Gordon Getty, and William Bolcom. Performed by Lisa Delan (soprano), Matt Haimovitz (cello), and Kristin Pankonin (piano). Pentatone Classics. Compact disc.
- 2013 – Daniel Okulitch: The New American Art Song. Works by Jake Heggie, Ricky Ian Gordon, Glen Roven, and Lowell Lieberman. Performed by Daniel Okulitch (bass-baritone) and accompanied by the composers. GPR Records. Compact disc.
- 2014 – Connection: Three Song Cycles. Performed by Regina Zona (soprano) and Kathleen Tagg (piano). Naxos Records. Compact disc.
- 2014 – Out of Darkness. Recording of three operas by Jake Heggie and Gene Scheer. Performed by Caitlin Lynch (soprano), Sarah Larsen (mezzo-soprano), Morgan Smith (baritone), Zart Domburian-Eby (flute), Laura DeLuca (clarinet), Mikhail Shmidt (violin), Walter Gray (cello), Jonathan Green (bass), and Craig Sheppard (piano). Naxos Records. Compact disc.
- 2015 – Love Life. Recording of From "The Book of Nightmares" and My true love hath my heart as well the premiere recording of Newer Every Day: Songs for Kiri. Performed by Ann Moss (soprano), Emil Miland (cello), Steven Bailey (piano), and Jake Heggie (piano). Angel Share Records. Compact disc.
- 2020 - Unexpected Shadows. Works by Jake Heggie. Performed by Jamie Barton, Jake Heggie, Matt Haimovitz. PENTATONE PTC 5186836. Compact disc.

== Videography ==
- 2002 – And Then One Night: The Making of Dead Man Walking. A behind-the-scenes look at the San Francisco Opera's 2001 world premiere production of Dead Man Walking, based on Sister Helen Prejean's book. Directed by Linda Schaller. PBS.
- 2013 – Moby-Dick. Recording of 2012 production by San Francisco Opera. Directed by Leonard Foglia and Frank Zamacona. San Francisco Opera/PBS. DVD and Blu-ray.
