= Brief Encounter (opera) =

Opera by André Previn

Brief Encounter is an opera in two acts by composer André Previn. The English libretto by John Caird is based on Noël Coward's play Still Life and Coward's screenplay for the 1945 David Lean film Brief Encounter. Commissioned by the Houston Grand Opera, the opera premiered on May 1, 2009 in Houston, Texas at the Wortham Theater Center.

The production starred Elizabeth Futral as Laura Jesson and Nathan Gunn as Alec Harvey, with Rebekah Camm, Meredith Arwady, Robert Orth, and Kim Josephson as supporting soloists and Patrick Summers conducting. A recording was issued on the Deutsche Grammophon label.
