= Patrick Summers =

American conductor (born 1963)

- Born: August 14, 1963 (age 63); Washington, Indiana
- Education: Indiana University

Patrick Summers (born August 14, 1963) is an American conductor best known for his work with Houston Grand Opera (HGO), where he has been the artistic and music director since 2011, and with San Francisco Opera, where he served as principal guest conductor, 1999–2016.

== Early years and San Francisco ==
Summers was born in Washington, Indiana, and raised in Loogootee, Indiana. He graduated from the Jacobs School of Music of Indiana University with a bachelor's degree in music in 1986. Upon graduation, he participated in the San Francisco Opera's Merola Opera Program as an apprentice coach in 1986 and 1987, and won the Otto Guth Memorial Award for excellence in vocal coaching both years. Summers's first professional engagement, with San Francisco Opera's Western Opera Theater, was conducting La bohème in its 1986–87 season. Following that performance, he served as musical director of the Western Opera Theater until 1989. He led the Western Opera Theater on its 1987 tour to China, performing for audiences that had never experienced Western opera. In 1988, he conducted the first Chinese performances of Puccini's Tosca in the modern era. In 1989, Summers began his tenure as the music director of the San Francisco Opera Center, a training program for young singers; his first mainstage production, Die Fledermaus, was in 1990. Other highlights include collaborating with André Previn on the 1998 world premiere of A Streetcar Named Desire and conducting several of the performances; serving as principal guest conductor from 1999 through 2016; conducting Jake Heggie's Moby-Dick, which was recorded and telecast on PBS's Great Performances; and in 2015 receiving the San Francisco Opera Medal, the company's highest honor. He conducted the West Coast premiere of Heggie's It's a Wonderful Life at SFO during the 2018–19 season.

== Houston Grand Opera and the Metropolitan Opera ==
In 2011, Summers was named artistic and music director of Houston Grand Opera after serving as music director since 1998. As music director of Houston Grand Opera, Summers oversaw the foundation and development of the HGO Orchestra: prior to the orchestra's foundation, HGO hired outside orchestras for its productions. Since 1998, Summers has conducted over 60 productions at Houston Grand Opera, including eight world premieres (notably Jake Heggie's It's a Wonderful Life, The End of the Affair, Three Decembers, and Carlisle Floyd's Cold Sassy Tree). In recent years, Summers helped oversee the creation of HGOco, an initiative designed to create partnerships between the company and the community. HGOco commissions new works and presents numerous opportunities for children and young voice students.

In 1998, Summers made his Metropolitan Opera conducting debut in Johann Strauss's Die Fledermaus, and returned regularly as a guest conductor, including participating in the Metropolitan Opera's 125th Anniversary Gala. He has appeared in four of the Metropolitan Opera Live in HD transmissions of Saturday matinee performances shown in cinemas around the world and has led the Metropolitan Opera National Council Auditions finals concert on several occasions. In 2006, Summers led the Metropolitan Opera on a tour of Japan.

== International opera conducting ==
Summers's European debut was in 1994 at the Rome Opera conducting Manon Lescaut. Also in 1994, he made his debut with Opera Australia, conducting La Cenerentola. He has since appeared at Barcelona's Gran Teatre del Liceu, most recently conducting La favorite (2018) after his house debut in La Cenerentola, the Welsh National Opera (Rigoletto), the Bregenz Festival (The Magic Flute and Carlisle Floyd's Of Mice and Men), Lisbon's Teatro Nacional de São Carlos (Ariadne auf Naxos), the Opéra national de Bordeaux (Don Pasquale and La bohème), and the European premiere of André Previn's A Streetcar Named Desire at the Opéra national du Rhin in Strasbourg.

== Symphonic work ==
Summers is also in demand as a symphonic conductor, often in collaboration with other artists, such as sopranos Renée Fleming and Christine Brewer. In 2010, Summers led pianist Yuja Wang and the Russian National Orchestra on an eight-city U.S. tour. Summers made his debut at the Norwegian National Opera and Ballet in a gala concert celebrating the company's 50th anniversary season, and his debut with the Slovenian Philharmonic Orchestra in Ljubljana conducting Michael Daugherty's Metropolis Symphony. In addition, he has conducted the Boston Symphony Orchestra at the Tanglewood Music Festival, the Colorado Symphony, the English Chamber Orchestra, the Indianapolis Symphony Orchestra, the Los Angeles Philharmonic at the Hollywood Bowl, the Milwaukee Symphony Orchestra, the Minnesota Orchestra, the Munich Symphony Orchestra, the National Arts Centre Orchestra, the National Symphony Orchestra at the Wolf Trap National Park for the Performing Arts, the Orchestra of St. Luke's, the Montreal Symphony Orchestra, the St. Louis Symphony, and the Saint Paul Chamber Orchestra.

== Work with composers ==
Patrick Summers's collaborations with living composers have resulted in the world premieres of nearly 20 works. Throughout his career, Summers has worked with composers Jake Heggie (Dead Man Walking, The End of the Affair, Three Decembers, Moby-Dick, Great Scott, and It's a Wonderful Life); Carlisle Floyd (Prince of Players and Cold Sassy Tree); Ricky Ian Gordon (The House without a Christmas Tree and A Coffin in Egypt); André Previn (A Streetcar Named Desire and Brief Encounter); Christopher Theofanidis (The Refuge and Heart of a Soldier); Daniel Catán (Salsipuedes); Lee Hoiby (The Tempest); Tod Machover (Resurrection); Paul Moravec (The Letter); Rachel Portman (The Little Prince); Mark Adamo; Michael Daugherty; and R. Murray Schafer, among others.

== Aspen Music Festival ==
In 2019, it was announced that Summers would become the co-artistic director of the new Aspen Opera Theater and VocalARTS alongside soprano Renée Fleming starting in 2020. This program is a part of the larger Aspen Music Festival and School.

== Recordings ==
Summers is featured on many audio and video recordings, including the 2002 audio recording Bel Canto with soprano Renée Fleming and the Orchestra of St. Luke's (Grammy Award).

=== Audio recordings ===
- The Phoenix (Tairk O'Regan/John Caird), Houston Grand Opera Orchestra, Pentatone, 2020.
- Great Scott (Jake Heggie/Terrence McNally), The Dallas Opera Orchestra, Erato, 2018.
- It's a Wonderful Life (Jake Heggie/Gene Scheer), Houston Grand Opera Orchestra, Pentatone, 2017
- Ailyn Pérez and Stephen Costello: Love Duets, BBC Symphony Orchestra, 2014
- Dead Man Walking (Jake Heggie/Terrence McNally), Houston Grand Opera Orchestra, Virgin Classics, 2012
- Brief Encounter (André Previn/John Caird), Houston Grand Opera Orchestra, Deutsche Grammophon, 2011
- Three Decembers (Jake Heggie/Gene Scheer), Houston Grand Opera Orchestra, Albany, 2008
- The Refuge (Christopher Theofanidis/Leah Lax), Houston Grand Opera Orchestra, Albany, 2008
- Cold Sassy Tree (Carlisle Floyd), Houston Grand Opera Orchestra, Albany, 2005
- Of Mice and Men (Carlisle Floyd), Houston Grand Opera Orchestra, Albany, 2003
- Florencia en el Amazonas (Daniel Catán/Marcela Fuentes-Berain), Houston Grand Opera Orchestra, Albany, 2002
- Resurrection (Tod Machover/Laura Harrington with additional material by Braham Murray), Houston Grand Opera Orchestra, Albany, 2002
- Bel Canto (Jimmy López/Nilo Cruz), Orchestra of St. Luke's, Decca, 2002 (Grammy Award)
- Little Women (Mark Adamo), Houston Grand Opera Orchestra, Ondine, 2001

=== Video recordings ===
- Bregenz Festival: Opera on the Lake Stage, Die Zauberflöte (Mozart), (Presto Classical, 2018)
- Madama Butterfly (Puccini), Metropolitan Opera (Sony, 2011)
- Salome (Richard Strauss) Metropolitan Opera (Sony, 2011)
- The Marriage of Figaro (Mozart), Opera Australia (2011)
- I puritani (Bellini), Metropolitan Opera (Deutsche Grammophon, 2008)
- La Cenerentola Rossini, Gran Teatre del Liceu (Decca, 2010)
- Little Women (Mark Adamo), Houston Grand Opera (Naxos, 2010)

== Writings ==
Summers's book The Spirit of This Place: How Music Illuminates the Human Spirit was published in 2018 by the University of Chicago Press.

In addition, he has contributed over 40 articles to Opera Cues, the official program book and magazine of Houston Grand Opera, having written on composers (Bellini, Britten, Donizetti, Handel, Janacek, Jerome Kern and Oscar Hammerstein II, Leoncavallo, Mascagni, Mozart, Puccini, Rossini, Strauss, Verdi, and Wagner), collaborations with living composers (Jake Heggie, Ricky Ian Gordon, and Stephen Sondheim), and features on opera donors, in addition to essays on conducting, opera, and education.

== Awards, honors, and media recognition ==
- Honorary doctor of music degree from Indiana University (2017)
- San Francisco Opera Medal (2015) ^{[2]}
- Lecturer for Rice University's Campbell Lecture Series (2013)
- Stars of Australia Award (2008)
- Named one of the "25 Most Powerful Names in U.S. Opera" by Opera News (2006)
- Grammy Award for recording of Bel Canto (2002)
- Named "Distinguished Alumnus" by San Francisco Opera's Merola Opera Program (2001)
- Stolichnaya's Artist of the Year (1998)
- Otto Guth Memorial Award, San Francisco Opera's Merola Opera Program (1986, 1987)
