= Krystyna Żywulska =

Polish writer and songwriter (1914–1992)

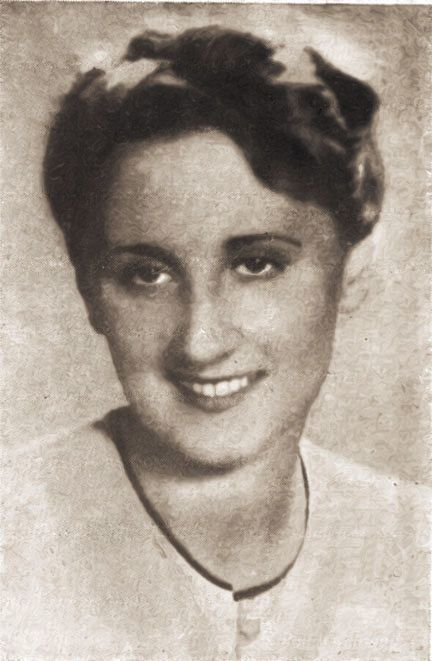
- Żywulska (1914–1992)
- Born: Zofia Landau; September 1, 1914 Łódź, Congress Poland
- Died: August 1, 1992 (aged 77) Düsseldorf, Germany

Krystyna Żywulska (born Zofia "Sonia" Landau; September 1, 1914 – August 1, 1992) was a Polish writer, columnist, songwriter and graphic designer of Jewish origin.

== Biography ==
Zofia Landau was born in Łódź. She studied law at Warsaw University, but her studies were interrupted by the outbreak of World War II.

In 1941, she and her family were resettled in the Warsaw ghetto. After two years, she and her mother managed to escape, but she had to leave her father in the ghetto under dramatic circumstances. She then became involved in the Polish resistance movement under the assumed name Zofia Wiśniewska, working in a group that produced false documents.

In 1943 she was arrested by the Gestapo. Interrogated at the Gestapo Warsaw headquarters on Szucha Avenue, known for its cruel interrogations, she gave her name as Krystyna Żywulska. She was imprisoned in the Pawiak prison and then, as a political prisoner, sent to the Auschwitz concentration and extermination camp established by the German Nazis in occupied Poland, from where she was sent to the Birkenau sub-camp. She was one of seven survivors of a transport of 800 people from Pawiak to the camp. She worked in the women's unit registering new prisoners (the so-called Canada), in the immediate vicinity of the gas chambers. In the camp Krystyna Żywulska composed poems (they could not be written down), which over time became very important to her fellow prisoners. They learned them by heart and passed them on. The most famous became "Wymarsz przez bramę" ("Marching through the gate"), which was to be sung on the day of the camp's liberation. Other titles include "Appeal", "Dance, girl", "Unsent letter", "Parade", "Earlier the birches grew here", which were also secretly passed on to other female prisoners and memorized. Most of these poems were lost: only eight survived, four of which Żywulska included in her book I Survived Auschwitz. On January 18, 1945, during the death march, the evacuation of the concentration camp from Oświęcim (Auschwitz) to Wodzisław Śląski, Żywulska managed to escape at the border of Brzeszcze and Jawiszowice, after which she hid with local residents.

After returning to Warsaw, she married her childhood friend Leon Andrzejewski (1910–1978), a functionary of the communist security apparatus, and had two children with him. She joined the Polish United Workers' Party (PZPR) and was a member of its executive branch at the Main Board of the Union of Polish Writers in 1950.

In the late 1950s, she met Thomas Harlan in Warsaw, whose father, Veit Harlan, directed propaganda films during the National Socialist era. Thomas Harlan was involved in tracking down Nazi crimes of people who were now important figures in the Federal Republic of Germany. She helped him with research whose publication was unwelcome in the Federal Republic of Germany, but which eventually helped trigger the German trials of several former Nazis in the 1960s. When Harlan and Żywulska began to uncover analogous careers of former Nazis in the German Democratic Republic, the commissioners of the book in which their research was to be published stopped the project.

In 1963 Żywulska wrote her next book, Empty Water, about the Warsaw Ghetto experience. When an anti-Semitic campaign developed in Poland after March 1968, Żywulska, who only revealed her Jewish background in Empty Water, was ostracized and her sons were forced to leave the country. She followed them first to Munich and then to Düsseldorf, where she settled permanently. There she translated both of her autobiographical books into German. Toward the end of her life she took up painting pictures. She died of leukemia. She is buried in Düsseldorf.

== Works ==
She made her debut in 1946 with the memoir I Survived Auschwitz. The book is a record of harrowing memories of life in the death camp. Originally published in Polish as Przezylam Oswiecim; also published in English as I Came Back (trans. 1951), French J'ai survécu Auschwitz, German Ich überlebte Auschwitz, Russian Я пережила Освенцим and Czech Přežila jsem Osvětim. The war period is also covered in the aforementioned Auschwitz poems and the novel Empty Water (1963), also published in English Empty Water, French L'eau vide, German Leeres Wasser, Japanese 空の水. When writing about Poles, Jews and Germans, she avoided simplifications, looking at each case individually.

She wrote satires, columns, epigrams, epigrams and limericks (published in 1956 in the book So Called Life). Her cabaret monologues and songs were performed on the radio and in films, as well as printed in the press (e.g., by Szpilki magazine). In 1968 Sława Przybylska performed her song "Żyje się raz". She wrote lyrics for the Wagabunda and U Lopka cabarets, as well as songs, the most popular of which are: "Dopóki życie trwa", "Taka jestem zakochana", "Żyje się raz", "Tańcz ze mną, tańcz" for the film "Kochajmy syrenki" (1966), "Ty i ja, i noc" for the film "Kulig" (1968).

== References to the life and works of Krystyna Żywulska ==
In 1991, Maria Nurowska picked up one of the threads of her biography from her time in a concentration camp in her book Love Letters, based on conversations she had previously conducted with Krystyna Żywulska.

In 1998, Liane Dirks used Żywulska's diary entries and notes from interviews with her in her book Krystyna. According to Andrzej Szczypiorski, this half-documentary, half-literary stylization only partially allows one to get closer to the truth about Żywulska.

In 2012, Jake Heggie composed a short opera, "Another Sunrise", in which the protagonist (Żywulska) tries every night to find a language suitable for expressing her memories so that she can record them on tape.

A feature film project based on the book Empty Water has been in development since 2012.

In 2017, preparations began for the production of the film "Three Women", directed by Magdalena Łazarkiewicz. The film is to tell the story of the intersecting fates of Krystyna Żywulska, Stanisława Rachwałowa, a prisoner of a German camp, persecuted by communist secret police after the war, and her persecutor from the Nazi camp, Maria Mandel. According to the film's producer, Andrzej Stachecki, "From these stories one can create a certain synthesis treating how a person facing different totalitarianisms knows how to find dignity in extreme situations and, most importantly, to forgive."
