= The End of the Affair =

1951 novel by Graham Greene

- First edition (with Daily Mail Book of the Month wrapper)
- Author: Graham Greene
- Language: English
- Set in: London, 1942–46
- Publisher: Heinemann
- Publication date: 1951
- Publication place: United Kingdom
- Media type: Hardcover (first edition)
- Pages: 237 (first edition)
- OCLC: 492087111
- Dewey Decimal: 823.912
- Preceded by: The Third Man (1950)
- Followed by: The Quiet American (1955)

The End of the Affair is a 1951 novel by British author Graham Greene, as well as the title of two feature films (released in 1955 and 1999) that were adapted from the novel. Set in London during and just after the Second World War, the novel examines the obsessions, jealousy and discernments within the relationships between three central characters: writer Maurice Bendrix; Sarah Miles; and her husband, civil servant Henry Miles.

Graham Greene's own affair with Catherine Walston formed the basis for The End of the Affair. The British edition of the novel is dedicated to "C" while the American version is made out to "Catherine". Greene's own house at 14 Clapham Common Northside was bombed during the Blitz.

The End of the Affair is the fourth and final of Greene's "Catholic novels" tetralogy, following Brighton Rock (1938), The Power and the Glory (1940), and The Heart of the Matter (1948).

== Plot ==
The novel focuses on Maurice Bendrix, a rising writer during the Second World War in London, and Sarah Miles, the wife of Henry, her amiable but boring husband and an important civil servant. Bendrix is based on Greene himself, and he reflects often on the act of writing a novel. Sarah is based on Greene's lover at the time, Catherine Walston, to whom the book is dedicated.

Bendrix and Sarah fall in love quickly, but he soon realises that the affair will end as quickly as it began. The relationship suffers from his overt and admitted jealousy, and he is frustrated by her refusal to divorce Henry. When a V-1 flying bomb blasts Bendrix's flat when he is with Sarah, he is nearly killed. After this, Sarah breaks off the affair with no apparent explanation.

Later, Bendrix is still wracked with jealousy when he sees Henry crossing the common that separates their flats. Henry has finally started to suspect something, and Bendrix decides to go to a private investigator to discover if Sarah has a new lover. The investigator acquires her diary, from which Bendrix learns that, when she thought he was dead after the bombing, she made a promise to God not to see Bendrix again if He allowed him to live. Greene describes Sarah's struggles after finding he was still alive. A lung infection brought to a climax by walking on the common in the rain leads to Sarah's sudden death, and then several miraculous events occur, advocating for some kind of meaningfulness to Sarah's faith. By the last page of the novel, Bendrix comes to believe in a God as well.

== Critical response ==
The End of the Affair is often considered among Greene's best novels. Writer Evelyn Waugh favorably reviewed the novel in a 6 September 1951 piece for The Month magazine. Waugh would later write, "Mr Greene has chosen another contemporary form, domestic, romantic drama of the type of Brief Encounter, and has transformed that in his own inimitable way." Waugh also noted that the story was “a singularly beautiful and moving one". Alex Preston writing for The Independent had similar praise for Greene's book: "'The End of the Affair' is his masterpiece: an astonishing, painfully moving interrogation of the contradictions in a Catholicism he couldn't live without but struggled to live with."

The novel was chosen by Robert McCrum for his list of the '100 Greatest Novels in English'.

Writer Jonathan Franzen said that he considered E. M. Forster and Graham Greene overrated, in particular highlighting The End of the Affair. However, he did also comment that he believed that part of the reason for this was his being American, as he said that many authors' brilliance is lost when it crosses the Atlantic. He said that he believed that the effect may have occurred with David Foster Wallace.

== Adaptations ==
In 1955, the book was made into a film, directed by Edward Dmytryk, with the screenplay adaptation by Lenore J. Coffee. David Lewis was the producer and David E. Rose executive producer. It starred Deborah Kerr as Sarah Miles, Van Johnson as Maurice Bendrix, John Mills as Albert Parkis, and Peter Cushing as Henry Miles.

In 1997, the novel was adapted into a play of the same name by Rupert Goold and Caroline Butler. It was first produced at the Salisbury Playhouse on 9 October 1997, directed by Goold. The first production included music played by a pianist at the side of the stage, underscoring the text with some period songs sung by the cast. Goold and Butler removed the music from later productions and the play was published without musical interpolation in 2001.

In 1999, the novel was made into another film, The End of the Affair, directed by Neil Jordan. Jordan also wrote the screenplay and produced the film with Stephen Woolley. It starred American actress Julianne Moore as Sarah Miles, English actor Ralph Fiennes as Maurice Bendrix, and Irish actor Stephen Rea as Henry Miles. Julianne Moore was nominated for an Academy Award for Best Actress for her performance.

In 2004, Jake Heggie composed an opera based on the novel. It premiered at the Houston Grand Opera in March of that year, and was subsequently revised into its final form.

In 2011, the novel was adapted into a play by Karla Boos and had its world premiere at Quantum Theatre.

In 2012, an audio edition performed by Colin Firth and produced by Audible.com was released; the recording was recognized as Audiobook of the Year at the Audies Gala in May 2013.

Ben Howard’s song “End of the Affair” from his sophomore album “I forget where we were” was inspired by this novel.
