= The End of the Affair (opera) =

Opera by Jake Heggie

- Chamber opera by Jake Heggie
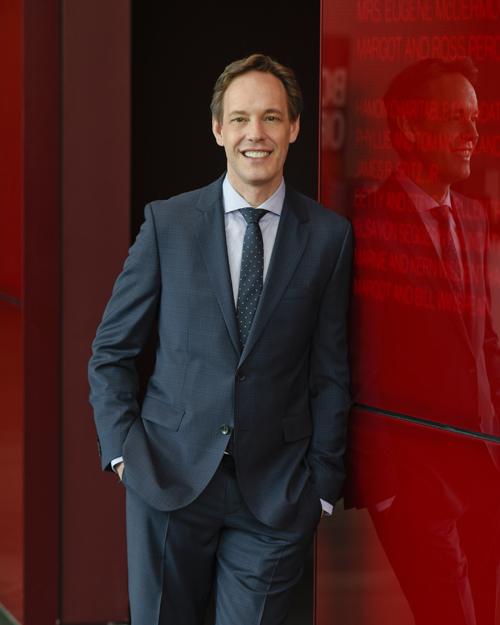
- The opera's composer
- Librettist: Leonard Foglia; Heggie
- Based on: The End of the Affair by Graham Greene
- Premiere: 2004; Houston Grand Opera

The End of the Affair is a chamber opera with music by Jake Heggie and a libretto by Heggie, Heather McDonald and Leonard Foglia.

Based on the Graham Greene novel of the same title, it is set in London in 1944 and 1946 and focuses on Maurice and Sarah, who have an affair. Sarah vows to end the illicit affair if Maurice's life is spared in a bombing. His survival leads to Sarah's religious conversion and Maurice's railing against God for it. After Sarah returns to her husband, Maurice hires a private detective to investigate her under direction of her husband Henry.

== Performance history ==
It premiered in March 2004 at Houston Grand Opera. The libretto's last ten minutes were revised to alter the ending for performances at Madison Opera and Seattle Opera.

The second version of the opera was recorded live in 2007 at the Lyric Opera of Kansas City with Emily Pulley (soprano) as Sarah Miles, Keith Phares (baritone) as Maurice Bendrix, Joyce Castle (mezzo-soprano) as Mrs. Bertram, Victor Benedetti (baritone) as Henry Miles, Robert Orth (baritone) as private Mr. Parkis, and Gerard Powers (tenor) as Richard Smythe.

== Critical reaction ==
Reaction to the version of the novel was decidedly mixed. "In what is a kind of on-stage musical equivalent of the slow fade into a flashback, he tells the story while bits and pieces are sung by the other characters until we are firmly in the flashback. That was an interesting effect that worked well," The same reviewer comments: "That is a good message but the response from most was so what. The connection between that and the love of God was not communicated."

== Roles ==
Role	Voice type	Premiere cast, March 2004 Conductor: Patrick Summers
Sarah Miles	soprano	Cheryl Barker
Maurice Bendrix, Sarah's lover	baritone	Teddy Tahu Rhodes
Henry Miles, Sarah's husband	baritone	Peter Coleman-Wright
Mr. Parkis, a private detective	baritone	Robert Orth
Richard Smythe, a rationalist	tenor	Joseph Evans
Mrs. Bertram, Sarah's mother	mezzo-soprano	Katherine Ciesinski
Lancelot, young son	speaking role	
