= Pacific Chorale =

Professional chorus

- Choir
- Former name: Irvine Community Chorus, Irvine Master Chorale
- Founded: 1968
- Founder: Maurice Allard
- Artistic Director: Robert Istad
- Headquarters: Costa Mesa, California
- Concert hall: Renée and Henry Segerstrom Concert Hall, Segerstrom Center for the Arts
- Website: www.pacificchorale.org

Pacific Chorale, founded in 1968, is a professional chorus performing in Costa Mesa, California at the Renée and Henry Segerstrom Concert Hall at Segerstrom Center for the Arts.

== Artistic director ==
Pacific Chorale was founded as the Irvine Community Chorus and then the Irvine Master Chorale under the direction of Maurice Allard. John Alexander became the Chorale's music director in 1972. Alexander has held posts including Professor of Music and Director of Choral Studies in the California State University System for 35 years. He has conducted hundreds of performances of choirs and orchestras in 27 countries around the globe. In 2006 he was presented a Distinguished Faculty Member award from California State University, Fullerton. He is a past president of Chorus America (2001–2003). Other awards include the Helena Modjeska Cultural Legacy Award (2003) for lifetime achievement as an artistic visionary in the arts in Orange County, and Outstanding Individual Artist Award (2000) from Arts Orange County. After 45 years as the organization's leader, Alexander stepped down in June 2017. Assistant conductor Robert Istad succeeded him as artistic director.

== Program and singers ==
Pacific Chorale consists of 140 professional and volunteer singers. The Chorale performs about six times per year in its own season. It also performs regularly with the Pacific Symphony and Los Angeles Philharmonic and performs as part of the Hollywood Bowl series in the summer. Other noted collaborations include the Boston Symphony, the National Symphony, and the Long Beach, Pasadena, Riverside, and San Diego symphonies. The Chorale performs a wide range of classics and modern pieces, and has commissioned numerous works including most recently The Shore (Symphony No. 3) by Frank Ticheli and The Radio Hour by Jake Heggie. The Chorale's regular season includes two performances of its popular Christmas concert as well as an annual performance of Handel's Messiah with the Pacific Symphony. The Chorale has toured in England, Belgium, Germany, Switzerland, Italy, Russia, France, Austria, Spain, South America, China, and Estonia, among others.

The Pacific Chorale's 24-voice professional chamber ensemble, known as the John Alexander Singers during Alexander's tenure, specializes in modern and early music, presenting a cappella chamber concerts and collaborating regularly with the Musica Angelica period chamber orchestra.

== Awards ==
Pacific Chorale has won a number of grants and awards including:

Grammy Award (2022) for “Choral Performance” for the performance on the recording of Gustav Mahler’s Symphony No. 8 in E-flat Major, under conductor Gustavo Dudamel.)

Chorus America (2015) Award for Education and Community Engagement

National Endowment for the Arts, $100,000 grant to present the American Masterpieces Choral Music Festival (2007)
ASCAP Chorus America (2005) Alice Parker Award for Adventurous Programming
Orange County Department of Education (2002) Outstanding Contributions to Education Award
Chorus America (1993) Margaret Hills Achievement Award for Choral Excellence

== Recordings ==
The Chorale has recorded a number of CDs including:

All Things Common (2020) by Tarik O'Regan, conducted by Robert Istad
The Radio Hour (2015) by Jake Heggie, conducted by John Alexander
American Voices (2014) Features works by Dale Warland, Eric Whitacre, John Muehleisen, John Orfe, Joseph Gregorio, Michael Rickelton, Morten Lauridsen, Norman Dello Joio. John Alexander conducts the chamber singers, and features Barry Perkins on trumpet and David Clemensen on piano. The Shore and Other Choral Works (2013) by Frank Ticheli, conducted by John Alexander
Vespers (2010) by Sergei Rachmaninoff, conducted by John Alexander
Christmas Time is Here (2005) with Pacific Symphony, conducted by John Alexander
An American Requiem, by Richard Danielpour (2002) with Pacific Symphony, conducted by Carl St.Clair
Sweet Harmony (2002) A cappella works performed by the John Alexander Singers with guest soloists, conducted by John Alexander
Nocturne (2000) A cappella works by Samuel Barber, Adolphus Hailstork, Eric Whitacre and John Alexander, conducted by John Alexander
Musica (1997) American a cappella works, conducted by John Alexander
Pacific Symphony's Fire, Water, Paper: A Vietnam Oratorio, by Elliot Goldenthal (1996) conducted by Carl St. Clair
Songs of Eternity by James F. Hopkins and Voices by Stephen Paulus (1995) with Pacific Symphony, conducted by John Alexander
Sing Noel (1992) with Pacific Chorale Children's Chorus and Pacific Brass Ensemble, conducted by John Alexander

The Chorale has also been featured on:

Mahler: Symphony No. 8 in E-Flat Major "Symphony of a Thousand" (2021) by Gustav Mahler, conducted by Gustavo Dudamel, featuring Los Angeles Master Chorale, Pacific Chorale, Los Angeles Children’s Chorus, National Children’s Chorus, and soloists Tamara Wilson, Leah Crocetto, Erin Morley, Mihoko Fujimura, Tamara Mumford, Simon O’Neill, Ryan McKinny, and Morris Robinson.
Ancient Voices (2015) by Richard Danielpour, conducted by Carl St.Clair, featuring Pacific Symphony Orchestra.
Canciones de Lorca / Prometheus (2015) by William Bolcom, conducted by Carl St.Clair, featuring Pacific Symphony Orchestra, tenor Ree Barbera, and pianist Jeffrey Biegel.
Toward a Season of Peace (2014) by Richard Danielpour, conducted by Carl St.Clair, featuring Pacific Symphony, Pacific Chorale, and soprano Hila Plitmann.
Mount Rushmore / Radio City / The Gospel According to Sister Aimee (2013) by Michael Daugherty, conducted by Carl St.Clair, including Pacific Symphony and American organist Paul Jacobs.
The Passion Of Ramakrishna (2012) by Philip Glass, conducted by Carl St.Clair, including Janice Chandler-Eteme, Christopheren Nomura, Kevin Deas, I-Chin Feinblatt, Nicolas Preston, Pacific Symphony.

== Premieres ==
=== World Premieres ===
- Jocelyn Hagen: What the Soul Already Knows (co-commission), 2025
- Frank Ticheli: Listen to the Silence (commission), 2024
- Florence Price: Abraham Lincoln Walks at Midnight (orchestral version), 2023
- Saunder Choi: Meet Me for Noche Buena (Commission), 2023
- Tarik O’Regan/Marcus Omari: The Quickening (commission), 2022
- Tarik O’Regan: The Stillness Chained, 2021
- Tarik O’Regan: Facing West (commission), 2019
- Karen P. Thomas: Le Stelle, 2018
- András Gábor Virágh: O salutaris hostia, 2016
- Jake Heggie/Gene Scheer: The Radio Hour (commission), 2014
- Frank Ticheli/David St. John: The Shore (commission), 2013
- John Orfe: Fire! (competition winner), 2012
- Joseph Gregorio: Love, thricewise (competition winner), 2010
- Zachary Wadsworth: Fantasy on a Theme by William Billings (competition winner), 2008
- Michael Eglin: Barter (competition winner), 2008
- Morten Lauridsen: Chanson Éloignée (commission), 2006
- Jake Heggie: Seeking Higher Ground (commission), 2006
- Lili Boulanger: Vieille Prière Bouddhique, 2006
- Frank Ticheli: The Song of Hope (commission), 2004
- Eric Whitacre: Winter (commission), 2000
- Lili Boulanger: Soir sur la plaine (orchestrated version), 2000
- John Alexander: Sweet Harmony, 2000
- Mozart: Requiem (Levin ed.), 1999
- Frank Ticheli: There Will Be Rest (commission), 1999
- James F. Hopkins: The Rossetti Songs (commission), 1998
- James F. Hopkins: From the Realm of the Sea (commission), 1997
- John Alexander: Musica, 1997
- James F. Hopkins: Come to Me in the Silence of the Night, 1997
- John Alexander: This Time for Kites, 1996
- James F. Hopkins: Songs of Eternity, 1993
- Dominick Argento: Te Deum, 1993
- Randall Stroope: Hodie, 1992
- Linda Wells: Gloria, 1980

=== US Premieres ===
- Tarik O’Regan – Critical Mass (co-commission), 2027
- Tarik O’Regan – A Celestial Map of the Sky (2017)
- Thierry Escaich – Trois Motets (2009)
- Ravel – L’aurore (2000)
- Ravel – Les bayadères (2000)

=== West Coast Premieres ===
- Frank Ticheli – Until Forever Fades Away (2022)
- Damien Geter – Cantata for a More Hopeful Tomorrow (2022)
- Michael Rickelton – Pentecost (2012)*
- David Lang – the little match girl passion (choral version) (2011)
- David Del Tredici – Paul Revere’s Ride (2008)
- Stephen Paulus – Voices of Light (2005)
- John Adams – On the Transmigration of Souls (2003)

== Community and Education Programs ==
- Pacific Chorale’s Choral Festival - Each year, a Festival Chorus of singers from community, school, university, church and temple choirs joins the voices of Pacific Chorale in a free public performance at the Renee and Henry Segerstrom Concert Hall.
- Pacific Chorale Academy - An award-winning after-school program provides free weekly choral instruction and youth development at participating sites.
- Intro to the Arts – Since 1986, Intro to the Arts has enabled more than ten thousand high school choral music students and social service partners to attend Pacific Chorale concerts free of charge.
- Choral Camp – Presented in association with the California State University Fullerton, high school students spend 5 days with a high-energy group of peers who love to sing, learning from top professionals in the industry.
