= Elizabeth Futral =

American soprano (born 1963)

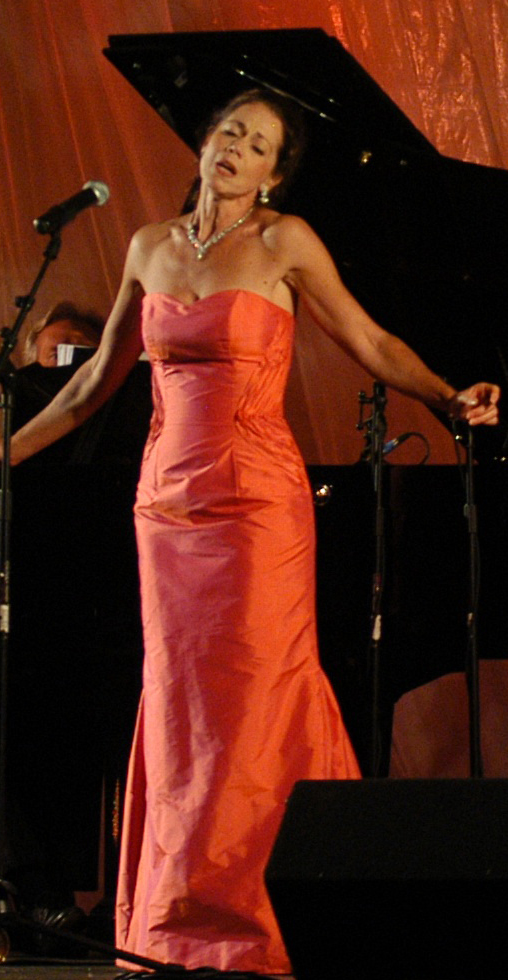
Elizabeth Futral performing at the 2010 Phoenicia International Festival of the Voice

Susan Elizabeth Futral (born September 27, 1963 in Johnston County, North Carolina) is an American coloratura soprano who has won acclaim (as both singer and actress) throughout the United States as well as in Europe, South America, and Japan.

== Early life and education ==
Born in Johnston County, North Carolina, Futral grew up in Covington, Louisiana. She earned a bachelor's degree in music performance from Samford University. After studying with Virginia Zeani at Indiana University School of Music, she spent two years as an apprentice with the Lyric Opera of Chicago. In 1991, she was a winner of the New York Metropolitan Opera National Council.

== Career ==
The soprano first garnered acclaim in the title role of the 1994 New York City Opera production of Delibes' Lakmé. Edward Rothstein wrote in The New York Times:

Ms Futral's performance was crucial to the success of the evening.... Ms Futral was refined and accurate, hitting her high notes without strain or artifice, giving her vocal acrobatics warmth without ever succumbing to egoism. She was not out to prove anything; the song ['The Bell Song'] was not laden with excessive emotion or elaborate musical gestures: it had the virtues of her performance throughout the evening, offering simplicity, grace and directness.

In 1995 Futral won 2nd prize in Plácido Domingo's Operalia International Opera Competition.

In 1996 she was invited to the Rossini Opera Festival to sing the title role in the first production of Rossini's Matilde di Shabran since 1821. Later that year, she sang the role of Catherine in Meyerbeer's L'étoile du nord at the Wexford Festival.

In September 1998, she created the role of Stella in the world premiere of André Previn's A Streetcar Named Desire for the San Francisco Opera. In February 2001, she debuted with the Los Angeles Opera as Cleopatra in Handel's Giulio Cesare. Other roles she has sung for the Los Angeles Opera include Sophie in Strauss's Der Rosenkavalier and Violetta Valéry in Verdi's La traviata.

On January 8, 1999, Futral made her debut with the Metropolitan Opera in the title role of Donizetti's Lucia di Lammermoor. In 2003, she sang the role of Princess Eudoxie in the Met's first performances since 1936 of Halévy's La Juive. She returned to the Met in December 2006 to star opposite Plácido Domingo and Paul Groves in the world premiere of Tan Dun's The First Emperor (which was televised and later published on DVD), later appearing in I puritani. In 2009 she portrayed Laura Jesson in the world premiere of Houston Grand Opera's production of André Previn's Brief Encounter with Nathan Gunn as Alec Harvey. In June 2014 she created the role of Alice B. Toklas in the world premiere of the Opera Theatre of Saint Louis' production of Twenty-Seven, with Stephanie Blythe as Gertrude Stein.

In addition to her stage roles, Futral also starred as Elvira in the 2010 film Juan, an English-language adaptation of Mozart's Don Giovanni in a contemporary setting by director Kasper Holten, playing opposite English baritone Christopher Maltman as Juan.

The soprano's recordings include Six Characters in Search of an Author, L'étoile du nord, A Streetcar Named Desire, Otello (of Rossini), Lucia di Lammermoor (in English translation), Of Mice and Men (of Floyd), Zelmira, Orpheus & Euridice (of Gordon), Brief Encounter (with Nathan Gunn), Evensong: Of Love and Angels (of Argento), Carlo di Borgogna (of Pacini), L'enfant et les sortilèges, as well as Sweethearts a collection of operetta arias and duets (on Newport Classic). In 2002, Futral recorded Great Operatic Arias for Chandos. She released a recital of three solo Bach cantatas in 2009 on the Lyrichord Early Music Series label with the Washington Bach Consort and recorded several of Mozart's concert arias for the 2005 Opera Rara release titled "Mozart: The Supreme Decorator," conducted by Sir Charles Mackerras.

Futral and her husband Steven White, noted conductor and artistic director of Opera Roanoke, live in Franklin County, Virginia, near Roanoke.
