= Three Decembers =

Opera by Jake Heggie

- Opera by Jake Heggie
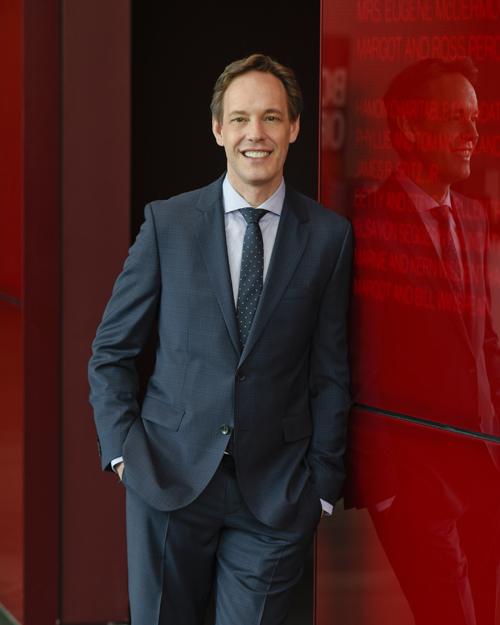
- The opera's composer
- Librettist: Gene Scheer
- Based on: Some Christmas Letters by Terrence McNally
- Premiere: February 29, 2008; Houston Grand Opera

Three Decembers is a chamber opera in two acts by Jake Heggie to a libretto by Gene Scheer which is based on the unpublished play Some Christmas Letters by Terrence McNally. Created with a role for Frederica von Stade, the work premiered on 29 February 2008 at the Houston Grand Opera (HGO). It commissioned the work in association with the San Francisco Opera and Cal Performances.

The opera was first presented under the working title Last Acts at the world premiere by the Houston Grand Opera. The premiere production was directed by Leonard Foglia with lighting designed by Brian Nason and costumes by Cesar Galindo. The ten-instrument chamber orchestra included two pianos played by Heggie himself as well as Patrick Summers, who also conducted the performance.

Subsequent productions have been presented in San Jose, San Diego, Washington, D.C., Portland, Chicago, Nashville, Atlanta, St Louis and Hawaii, and in Britain by Opera della Luna (2022).

== Synopsis ==
The three parts of the opera are set in the month of December in the years 1986, 1996 and 2006 and it tells the story of a famous actress, Madeline, and her two adult children as they struggle to know and love each other. "It is the universal story about the family we wish for and the family we wind up with."

== Roles ==
Role	Voice type	Premiere cast, 29 February 2008 Conductor: Patrick Summers
Madeline (Maddie), a famous actress	mezzo-soprano	Frederica von Stade
Charlie, Madeline's son	baritone	Keith Phares
Beatrice (Bea), Madeline's daughter	soprano	Kristin Clayton
