= Mina F. Miller =

American classical pianist, writer, and artistic director

- Born: Mina Florence Miller; 1949 (age 76–77); New York City, New York, U.S.
- Genre: Classical
- Occupations: Musician; writer
- Instrument: Piano

Mina Florence Miller (born 1949), credited as Mina F. Miller and Mina Miller, is an American classical pianist, writer, and founder and artistic director of Music of Remembrance in Seattle, Washington.

== Career ==
Miller studied piano performance under Artur Balsam at the Conservatory of Manhattan School of Music, and was awarded a Ph.D. in Music at New York University. She became Associate Professor of Music at the University of Kentucky in 1977, was appointed Assistant Professor (with tenure) in 1984 and was named a University Research Professor for the year 1988–89. She has performed in solo recitals in England and Scandinavia and in concerts in Europe and North America.

In 1982, Miller prepared the first collected edition with critical commentary of the piano works of Danish composer Carl Nielsen (Miller 1982), for which she performed the first recorded version, The Complete Piano Music of Carl Nielsen (Hyperion-CD-1987). She also wrote Carl Nielsen: A Guide to Research, a collection of sources with commentary from the author (Miller 1987), and edited The Nielsen companion (Miller 1994) for which she wrote interludes, including "Ink v. Pencil: Implications for the Performer" about Nielsen's Violin Sonata No. 1.

Miller also recorded The Piano Music of Leoš Janáček (Ambassador-CD-1996).

Miller founded Music of Remembrance 1998 in Seattle. She is the President and Artistic Director as well as performing herself. This is a group whose purpose is to find and perform music composed by victims of The Holocaust, irrespective of their background, as well as to perform related newly commissioned works.

== Personal life ==
Miller was born in New York City. Her parents stayed in America after visiting the 1939 New York World's Fair when it became clear they could not return to Lithuania, where "their entire families were murdered." While researching The Holocaust she became aware of music which had been composed in Terezin concentration camp and decided to found Music of Remembrance.

== Publications ==
=== Print ===
- Miller, Mina F. (1982). The Complete Solo Piano Music of Carl Nielsen. A Critical Revised Edition. Copenhagen: Edition Wilhelm Hansen.
- Miller, Mina (1982b). "Some Thoughts upon Editing the Music of Carl Nielsen". Current Musicology. 34: 64–74.
- Miller, Mina F. (1987). Carl Nielsen: A Guide to Research. New York: Garland. ISBN 978-0-8240-8569-8.
- Miller, Mina F., ed. (1994). The Nielsen companion. London, New York: Faber & Faber. ISBN 978-0-571-16143-0.

=== Discography ===
- Mina Miller (piano) (1987). The Complete Piano Music of Carl Nielsen (CD). Hyperion. CSA66231/2. Miller also wrote the main sleeve notes.
- Mina Miller (piano) (1996). The Piano Music of Leoš Janáček (CD). Ambassador. ARC1020. Miller also wrote the main sleeve notes.
