= Gerdine Young Artists =

The Gerdine Young Artists is an opera young artist program named for the Opera Theatre of St. Louis' founding board chairman and the National Medal of Arts recipient, Leigh Gerdine. The Gerdine Young Artists receive training and professional experience from internationally established opera stars and conductors. Teachers in their master classes have included Anthony Rolfe Johnson, Marlena Malas, Phyllis Curtin, Evelyn Lear, Erie Mills, Jerry Hadley, Grace Bumbry, John Wustman, Sheri Greenawald, Lotfi Mansouri, Sherrill Milnes, Shirley Verrett, Colin Graham, James Robinson, and Stephen Lord

Members of the program sing in the chorus as well as in supporting roles and/or cover for leading and featured roles in mainstage productions of the Opera Theatre of St. Louis. They also appear as soloists in the company's community outreach presentations. The Gerdine Young Artists are hired on an AGMA contract and receive a weekly salary, round-trip transportation, a sustenance allowance and accommodation during their engagement.
