= Kathryn Day =

American opera singer

Kathryn Day (née Bouleyn, born May 3, 1947) is an American opera singer who has had an active international career spanning five decades. She began her career as a leading soprano under the name Kathryn Bouleyn in the 1970s and 1980s with companies like the New York City Opera, the San Francisco Opera, and the Opera Theatre of Saint Louis. With the latter institution she created the role of Cora in the world premiere of Stephen Paulus' The Postman Always Rings Twice (1982).

In the 1990s Day transitioned to leading mezzo-soprano roles with the aid of companies like the Seattle Opera and the Opéra de Montréal. In 2003 she portrayed Jeanne Loiuse de Pontalba in the world premiere of Thea Musgrave's Pontalba at the New Orleans Opera. She has been a regular presence at the Metropolitan Opera in mainly comprimario roles since 2005. She has appeared on several broadcasts of the Metropolitan Opera Live in HD. She has sometimes been billed as Kathryn Bouleyn Day.

== Education and early career as a soprano ==
Born in Philadelphia, Day studied at the Jacobs School of Music at Indiana University Bloomington and at the Curtis Institute of Music where she was a pupil of Margaret Harshaw. She placed third in the finals of the Metropolitan Opera National Council Auditions in 1973, which led to her debut performance at the Metropolitan Opera House on March 25, 1973, singing "Come scoglio" from Così fan tutte and "Song to the Moon" from Rusalka. She made her professional opera debut in 1972 with the Pennsylvania Opera Company as Violetta in La traviata. That same year she was the soprano soloist in Verdi's Requiem with the Mendelssohn Club. In 1973 she portrayed Mimi in La bohème and Violetta with the Little Lyric Opera Company in Philadelphia. In 1974 she made her debut with the Philadelphia Lyric Opera Company as Nella in Gianni Schicchi.

Day sang Rusalka for the United States premiere of that opera for her debut with the San Diego Opera in 1975. She later returned to San Diego as Ninetta in The Love for Three Oranges (1978), Nanetta in Falstaff (1978), Tatiana in Eugene Onegin (1985) and Countess Almaviva in The Marriage of Figaro (1986). In 1977 she made her debut at the San Francisco Opera (SFO) as Bubikopf in Viktor Ullmann's Der Kaiser von Atlantis. She has since returned to the SFO as Clorinda in Monteverdi's Il combattimento di Tancredi e Clorinda (1977), the Third Norn in Götterdämmerung (1985, 1990), and Gutrune in Götterdämmerung (1985). She also sang Tatiana for her debut at the Long Beach Opera in 1984.

In 1976 Day made her debut at Carnegie Hall as the soprano soloist in Florent Schmitt's Psalm 47, a setting of Psalm 47, with the Philadelphia Orchestra under conductor Eugene Ormandy. In 1977 she made her debut at the Santa Fe Opera as Anaide in the United States premiere of Nino Rota's Il cappello di paglia di Firenze. In 1979 she performed the role of Servilia in Mozart's La clemenza di Tito at Avery Fisher Hall for the Mostly Mozart Festival, and made her debut at the New York City Opera (NYCO) as Valencienne in The Merry Widow. In December 1979 she was soprano soloist in Handel's Messiah with Musica Sacra under conductor Richard Westenburg at Lincoln Center. She performed the same work with the Oratorio Society of New York under conductor under Lyndon Woodside at Carnegie Hall the following year.

In 1980 Day was the soprano soloist in Beethoven's Missa Solemnis with the New York Choral Society at Carnegie Hall. That same year she portrayed Rosina in the United States premiere of Joseph Haydn's La vera costanza at the Caramoor Festival, performed Number 1 in Conrad Susa's Transformations at the Spoleto Festival USA, and returned to the NYCO as Princess Margaret in The Student Prince. In 1981 she appeared at the Opera Theatre of Saint Louis (OTSL) as Fennimore in the United States premiere of Frederick Delius' Fennimore and Gerda, made her debut with the Pennsylvania Opera Theater as the Countess Almaviva, and made her European debut at the Dutch National Opera in the title role of The Cunning Little Vixen.

Day returned to the OTSL in 1982 to create the role of Cora in the world premiere of Stephen Paulus' The Postman Always Rings Twice. She also returned to the NYCO in 1982 to portray Countess Almaviva to Alan Titus' Count. In 1983 she sang Tatyana to Thomas Allen's Eugene Onegin at Festival Ottawa in Canada's National Arts Centre, and in 1984 she was Mimi to Tonio di Paolo's Rodolfo at the Canadian Opera Company. In 1985 she was a soloist in Bach's St Matthew Passion with the Orchestra of St. Luke's and the American Boychoir under conductor John Nelson. In 1986 she portrayed Sieglinde in Die Walküre at Artpark near Niagara Falls. In 1987 she returned to the NYCO as Santuzza in Cavalleria rusticana and made her debut at the Metropolitan Opera as Vitellia in La clemenza di Tito. In 1988 she made her debut at the Welsh National Opera as Tatiana in Eugene Onegin and her debut at the Scottish Opera as Donna Elvira in as Don Giovanni. In 1989 she sang Leonore in Beethoven's Fidelio at Theater Basel.

== Later career as a mezzo-soprano ==
In 1990 Day performed at the Opéra de Nice and made her debut at the Seattle Opera as Venus in Tannhäuser. She has returned to Seattle many times since, portraying such roles as Giulietta in The Tales of Hoffmann (1990), Leonore in Fidelio (1991), Ortrud in Lohengrin (1994), Azucenna in Il trovatore (1997), and Ulrica in Un ballo in maschera (2002). In 1992 she was the soprano soloist in Rossini's Petite messe solennelle with the Philadelphia Singers. She returned to the OTSL as Kabanicha in Káťa Kabanová (1998) and Marcellina in The Marriage of Figaro (1999). In 1999 she appeared at the Opéra de Montréal as Herodias in Richard Strauss' Salome and as Madelon in Andrea Chénier at the Baltimore Opera.

In 2000 Day returned to the NYCO as Princess Clarissa in The Love for Three Oranges and returned to San Diego as Azucena. That same year she performed the role of La Cieca in La Gioconda with the Collegiate Chorale and the Orchestra of St. Luke's under Robert Bass at Carnegie Hall. In 2002 she portrayed Suzuki in Madama Butterfly at the Opéra de Montréal. She returned to the Long Beach Opera as Clytemnestra in Strauss' Elektra (2001) and Buryjovka in Janáček's Jenůfa. In 2003 she created the role of Jeanne Loiuse de Pontalba in the world premiere of Thea Musgrave's Pontalba at the New Orleans Opera. That same year she portrayed Mrs. Roucher in Jake Heggie's Dead Man Walking with the Austin Lyric Opera. In 2004 she played Mrs. McLean in Floyd's Susannah at the Chautauqua Opera. In 2005 she appeared at Opera Boston as Goody Proctor in Robert Ward's The Crucible and returned to the Spoleto Festival as The green fairy in Respighi's La bella dormente nel bosco. She returned to the Chautauqua Opera in 2006 as The Old Baroness in Samuel Barber's Vanessa.

Day returned to the Met in performances of Rise and Fall of the City of Mahagonny in 1995. After a decade long absence she returned for performances of Káťa Kabanová in 2005 as Glasa. She has been a performer in 176 productions with the company ever since, appearing in productions of Rigoletto (2005-2006 & 2009–2011, Giovanna), La traviata (2006-2010, Annina), The Magic Flute (2006, the 3rd Lady), Jenůfa (2007, the Mayor's Wife), Die ägyptische Helena (2007, Elf), War and Peace (2007-2008, housemaid), The Gambler (2008, Suspicious Old Lady), The Queen of Spades (2008 & 2011, Governess), Thaïs (2008, Albine), Elektra (2009, Serving Woman), The Nose (2010 & 2013, Respectable Lady), and Manon (2012 & 2015, maid).

In 2012 Day portrayed Suzuki in Madama Butterfly at the Portland Opera. In 2013 she appeared as Mrs. Sedley in Peter Grimes at the Des Moines Metro Opera. In 2014 she performed the role of Bronka in Mieczysław Weinberg's The Passenger under conductor Patrick Summers at the Houston Grand Opera. She is scheduled to repeat the role of Bronka at the Florida Grand Opera in 2016.
