= Joseph Rescigno =

American conductor (born 1945)

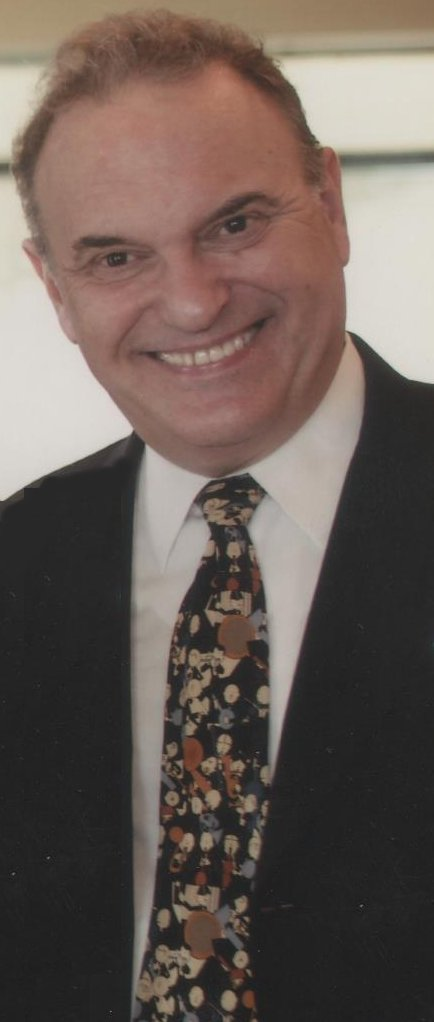
Portrait of Joseph Rescigno

Joseph Rescigno (born October 8, 1945) is an American conductor best known for his work in opera in North America and Europe. He served as Artistic Advisor and Principal Conductor of the Florentine Opera Company of Milwaukee, WI for 38 seasons beginning in 1981. He also served as Artistic Director of l'Orchestre Métropolitain du Grand Montréal, in Quebec, Canada, for four seasons. His commitment to young musicians and singers prompted his return each year from 2005 to 2025 to La Musica Lirica, a summer program for singers in Northern Italy where he served as Music Director.^{,} He has mentored Solti Foundation U.S. Award recipients as part of the Foundation's residency project (newly expanded to opera) since the 2014–2015 season, first at the Florentine and later elsewhere. In this program, award recipients apprentice through an entire rehearsal and performance cycle. (Note: A foundation sponsored by the family of the late Georg Solti: Solti Foundation U.S.)

In addition, he serves on the advisory committee of the Olga Forrai Foundation, which supports the training, education, and career development of singers and conductors. (Note: Olga Forrai was a soprano of Hungarian birth and formed her foundation with Peter Herman Adler in 1981: Olga Forrai Foundation.)

Rescigno is also the author of Conducting Opera: Where Theater Meets Music (University of North Texas Press, 2020).

== Early years ==
Born October 8, 1945 in Flushing, Queens, Rescigno is the eldest of three siblings. His father, also Joseph Rescigno, was a medical doctor, and his mother, Leona Reese Llewellyn, was a singer who met her future husband while playing piano rehearsals for his brother, Nicola Rescigno.^{,}^{,} (Note: In 1985, history repeated itself to some extent when conductor Joseph Rescigno's brother Thomas attended a rehearsal at the New York City Opera (Daughter of the Regiment) and met the maestro's prima donna, Erie Mills, whom he married in 1986.)

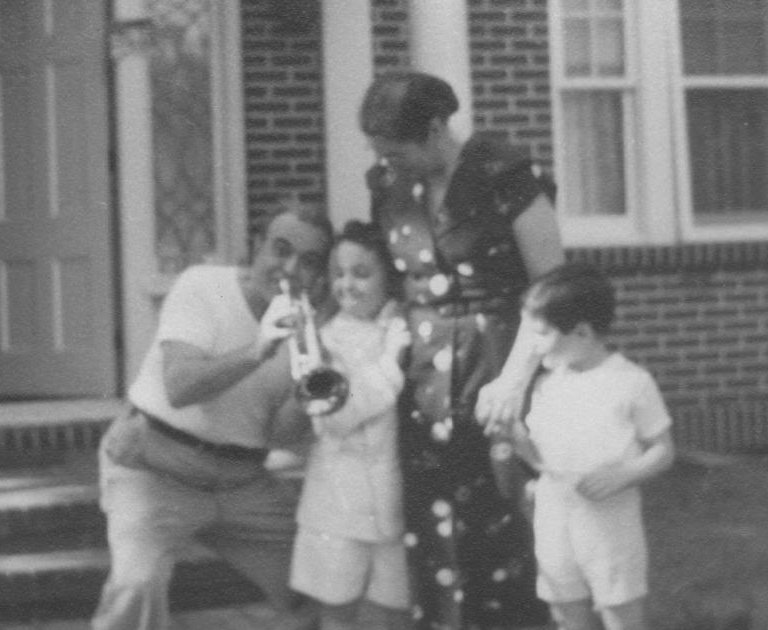
Joseph Rescigno playing the trumpet for his grandchildren Joseph and Thomas Rescigno and their mother.

Maestro Joseph Rescigno's first music teachers were his mother and his paternal grandfather, Joseph Rescigno, who played trumpet for the New York Philharmonic and the Metropolitan Opera as well as elsewhere in New York for several decades before World War II. (Note: The latter is sometimes confused with the Joseph Rescigno who played French horn in the Saint Louis Symphony and Arturo Toscanini's NBC Symphony Orchestra. The horn player was the trumpet player's first cousin and, therefore, first cousin twice removed to the subject of this article.) So Maestro Joseph Rescigno was immersed in the language and culture of musicians from the day he was born. He counts about 10 musicians in the extended Rescigno clan, mostly in his grandfather's generation. The result was that he was sight-singing as a toddler.^{,}

While never his nephew's teacher in a formal sense, Nicola Rescigno was a significant influence and mentor. Being able to attend his uncle's rehearsals and performances in Chicago furthered the younger musician's education. It was there, in 1955, that he first watched the complex undertaking of assembling an opera production (and first heard Maria Callas in a piano rehearsal with his uncle conducting Il trovatore). As a teenager, he graduated to playing rehearsal piano for his uncle and others like Gianandrea Gavazzeni.

Rescigno attended a neighborhood parochial school, St. Mary's Nativity, and studied piano nearby with Prof. Mario Miccu, under whose baton he played Mozart's Concerto in A major, No. 23 (first movement) at Manhattan's Town Hall at age 9. He went on to military high school in Manhattan (Xavier High School) and later began studying piano with Ada Kopetz-Korf, with whom he would continue studying through college and graduate school. (Note: Ada Kopetz-Korf's career had included playing with such conductors as Leopold Stokowski, Dimitri Mitropoulos, and Wilfrid Pelletier; touring the United States and Canada as a part of the Philharmonic Piano Quartet; and recording for Columbia Records.)

As a Fordham University freshman, Rescigno made his New York recital debut at Carnegie Recital Hall in a program of Beethoven's piano sonatas. (Note: Specifically, Nos. 7, 8, 15, and 21.) Writing in the New York Herald Tribune, Judith Robison described Rescigno's "emotional depth and flair for pathos" in a review entitled "A True Bard's Strong Debut." He earned a bachelor's degree in modern languages and philosophy at Fordham, graduating summa cum laude, Phi Beta Kappa. And his college career included a year in Rome studying at the Gregorianum and the conservatory at Santa Cecilia as well as privately with Arturo Benedetti Michelangeli and Alberto Neuman. His senior honors thesis compared the character of Falstaff in Giuseppe Verdi's opera of the same name to the Falstaff character that appears in three of William Shakespeare's plays.

In 1969, Rescigno received his master's degree in piano from the Manhattan School of Music. (Note: The program of his master's recital included works by Soler, Beethoven, Debussy, and Mussorgsky.) There, he also studied composition and conducting with Nicolas Flagello and met colleague and mentor Anton Coppola. Rescigno also came to know and admire Jonel Perlea, Hugh Ross, and soprano Ellen Repp, (Note: Ellen Repp was an American mezzo-soprano of Swedish descent. She sang in many major opera houses and taught singers who have gone on to major careers. Reviews from the 1930s and 1940s may be found at the New York Times web site.) among others.

== Career ==
Rescigno's lifelong ambition was conducting, and at the urging of Ellen Repp, he applied to study at the Mozarteum Salzburg's academy in the summer after he was to receive his master's degree. To qualify for the course he was given the task of sight-singing a melody by Pierre Boulez, and he was admitted. He took master classes with Herbert von Karajan, and played piano for Karajan's Don Giovanni rehearsals. In Salzburg, he also met Bruno Maderna who remained a friend and mentor long after that summer ended.^{,}

Rescigno returned to New York and conducted the preparatory division orchestra at the Manhattan School of Music from 1969 through 1976. His first professional opportunity arose in 1971 thanks to a referral from his uncle: assistant conductor and chorus master for the Connecticut Opera in Hartford. There he met and worked with Carlo Moresco and other visiting conductors. In the late seventies, he also served as artistic director of Artists International in Providence, RI, and served as associate conductor for Laszlo Halasz at the Concert Orchestra and Chorus of Long Island.

In the late 1970s and 1980s, Rescigno's assignments occasionally took him to his uncle's company in Dallas, where he conducted student performances and worked on outreach activities. There, he met new mentors and advisors, notably Roberto Benaglio, the chorus master of La Scala, and Vasco Naldini, its prompter. However, at the end of 1979, Rescigno was diagnosed with mouth cancer. Although he recovered fully, the illness resulted in some fall-off in offers to free-lance and dampened his spirit for a time.

In 1980, John Gage, a former actor and theater director turned opera company manager, was appointed general director of the Florentine Opera Company. Later that year, he found himself in need of a conductor for La Gioconda, starring Gilda Cruz-Romo, the following March. Having worked with Nicola Rescigno, he called Dallas hoping that the maestro would be willing to come to Milwaukee. However, the elder Rescigno had never conducted the infrequently produced piece. He could think of only two names to recommend, one being that of his nephew, who ultimately conducted the opera.

Later in 1981, Rescigno said yes to succeeding stage director David Hicks as Gage's artistic advisor, and he served in that capacity for 38 seasons, through three general directors: Gage, Dennis Hanthorn, and William Florescu. And throughout this time, in the pit, he conducted the Milwaukee Symphony Orchestra, which he considers the foundation that allowed the company to think big. "Few opera [companies] have an orchestra such as the MSO to work with," he has been quoted as saying.

In addition to his position in Milwaukee, Rescigno remained in demand as a guest conductor, and his career often took him to Canada. He conducted several productions for the Montreal Opera, leading both of the two orchestras it routinely used: the l'Orchestre Symphonique and l'Orchestre Métropolitain. In 1995, he recorded Verismo for the Montreal Opera, with soprano Diana Soviero and an orchestra composed substantially of the musicians of l'Orchestre Métropolitain. Soon after, he was appointed music director of that orchestra, causing something of a stir that abated after a few months.^{,} Rescigno made four commercial recordings with the orchestra. In addition, under his leadership, the Orchestra won Quebec's Prix Opus for a program of all five Beethoven piano concertos with Anton Kuerti in the summer of 1997 at the Festival de Lanaudière.

In 1998, a new president and substantially new board of directors took over the orchestra. The president was Jean-Pierre Goyer, a lawyer and former Canadian cabinet minister. In 1999, Rescigno's contract was increasingly being breached, and he engaged a lawyer at Lavery, de Billy to assert his rights early in 2000. Thereupon, Goyer held a press conference to allege a resignation and mutual agreement to terminate the contract and announce Rescigno's replacement. Rescigno replaced the lawyers at Lavery, de Billy with the law firm Stikeman Elliott and sued. The Honourable Sylviane Borenstein, J.S.C., ultimately found that the "Defendant fired Plaintiff without cause and his contract was terminated in a brutal, abusive, cavalier and malicious manner." In addition, the Court labeled comments Goyer made at the March 9, 2000 press conference, immediately afterward, and into the Fall of 2000, as "false," "insulting," "gratuitous," and "malicious."^{,} Although the Orchestra briefly sought bankruptcy protection, it settled in early May 2006, and the May 23 newspapers carried an announcement of Goyer's retirement.

Through this litigation and beyond, Rescigno has continued conducting guest engagements in North America, Asia, and Europe while remaining with the Florentine (until 2019). He has also continued tackling new repertory, with such works as Der Rosenkavalier, Falstaff, Idomeneo, La gazzetta, Little Women, Macbeth, Río de Sangre, The Magic Flute, and Tristan und Isolde as well as symphonic works.

== Repertory ==
In five decades, Rescigno has conducted a broad swath of operas from the standard literature, masterworks of the choral literature, and symphonies and concertos from the baroque to the modern eras, sometimes conducting from the keyboard in works from the earlier eras.

In addition to the Italian opera with which he had long been associated, Rescigno began conducting German Romantic opera in 1983 with Richard Strauss's Salome. To prepare, he asked conductor Richard Woitach, his friend and neighbor, for an introduction to conductor Erich Leinsdorf, and Leinsdorf became the last of his generation to leave his mark on Rescigno.^{,} Rescigno has been credited with bringing the "Latin sun" to Richard Wagner's music. "I hope the audience regards this piece as a beautiful, lyrical work with its essence in song," he is quoted as saying regarding Die Walküre. "It's important to choose balances and tempi to allow the singers to sing beautifully."

Rescigno has also embraced new works like Minoru Miki's Jōruri for Opera Theater of Saint Louis, Don Davis's Río de Sangre at the Florentine Opera, Denis Gougeon's Piano Concerto with l'Orchestre Métropolitain, and Ernesto Cordero's Concierto de Bayoán (for guitar) at the Casals Festival—all world premieres under his baton. As music director of a symphony orchestra, he explicitly committed to showcasing the works of living—and local—composers,^{,} and in four seasons, he programmed the works of Linda Bouchard, Stewart Grant, Jacques Hétu, François Morel, Michael Oesterle, André Prévost, and R. Murray Schafer, along with those of contemporary composers from outside Canada.

In 2013, he conducted a different kind of rarity, Rossini's 1816 La Gazzetta with newly discovered music that had escaped notice for the 2002 critical edition of the work, collaborating with musicologist Philip Gossett, with whom he had worked on La Cenerentola at Opera Theater of Saint Louis.

== Personal life ==
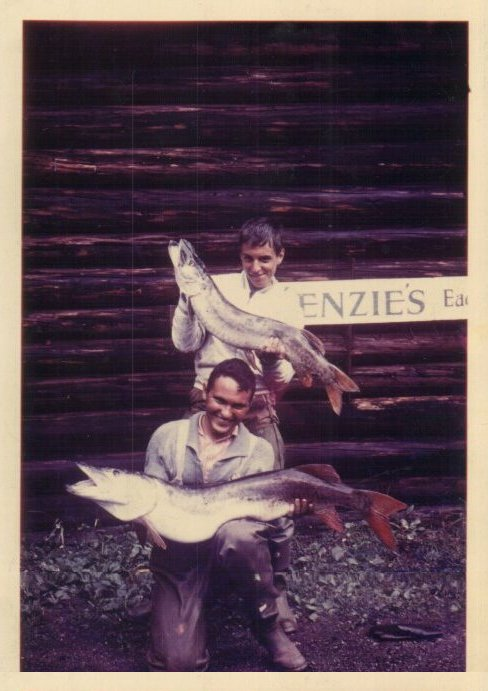
Thomas Rescigno (top) and his brother Joseph, with a couple of muskellunges at Eagle Lake, Ontario, 1961.

Rescigno has sketched and painted in pastels throughout his life, on occasion creating and contributing original works to be sold at benefit auctions.

He also enjoys visiting museums and collecting antiques with his wife Jeanne. They married in 1971 and reside in New York City.

Other favorite recreational activities include both surf-casting and fly fishing.

An avid gastronome and oenophile, Rescigno also can often be found in the kitchen and at wine auctions.

== Recognition ==
Rescigno has been described as "a conductor to treasure" and "a conductor's conductor." He has been recognized for programming imaginatively (often in collaboration with other arts organizations), rethinking old standards, venturing into unexpected repertory, invigorating orchestras, accompanying skillfully, and presenting engaging commentary from the stage.

== Discography ==
Studio recordings for Analekta Recording, Inc., Montréal (Québec), Canada:

- Verismo, with Diana Soviero, l'Orchestre de l'Opéra de Montréal, AN 2 9602 ©1995.
- Beethoven with l'Orchestre Métropolitain and featuring Karina Gauvin, FL 2 3105 ©1997
- Mendelssohn with violinist Angèle Dubeau, l'Orchestre Métropolitain, FL 2 3098 ©1997.
- Brahms with pianist Anton Kuerti, l'Orchestre Métropolitain, FL 2 3139-40 ©1998.
- Mozart with Lyne Fortin, l'Orchestre Métropolitain, FL 2 3131 ©1999.

Río de Sangre by Don Davis, 2010 world premiere recorded live, the Milwaukee Symphony Orchestra for the Florentine Opera Company, TROY1296-97, ©2011 Albany Records USA.

Jōruri by Minoru Miki, 1988 Japanese premiere of the 1985 world premiere production recorded live for Dreamlife Corporation Tokyo, The Tokyo Symphony Orchestra for Opera Theater of Saint Louis and the Nissei Theater, laser disk LSZS 00186 and videocassette VFZT00918, ©1990.

== See also ==
- Nicola Rescigno
