= Il cappello di paglia di Firenze =

Opera by Nino Rota

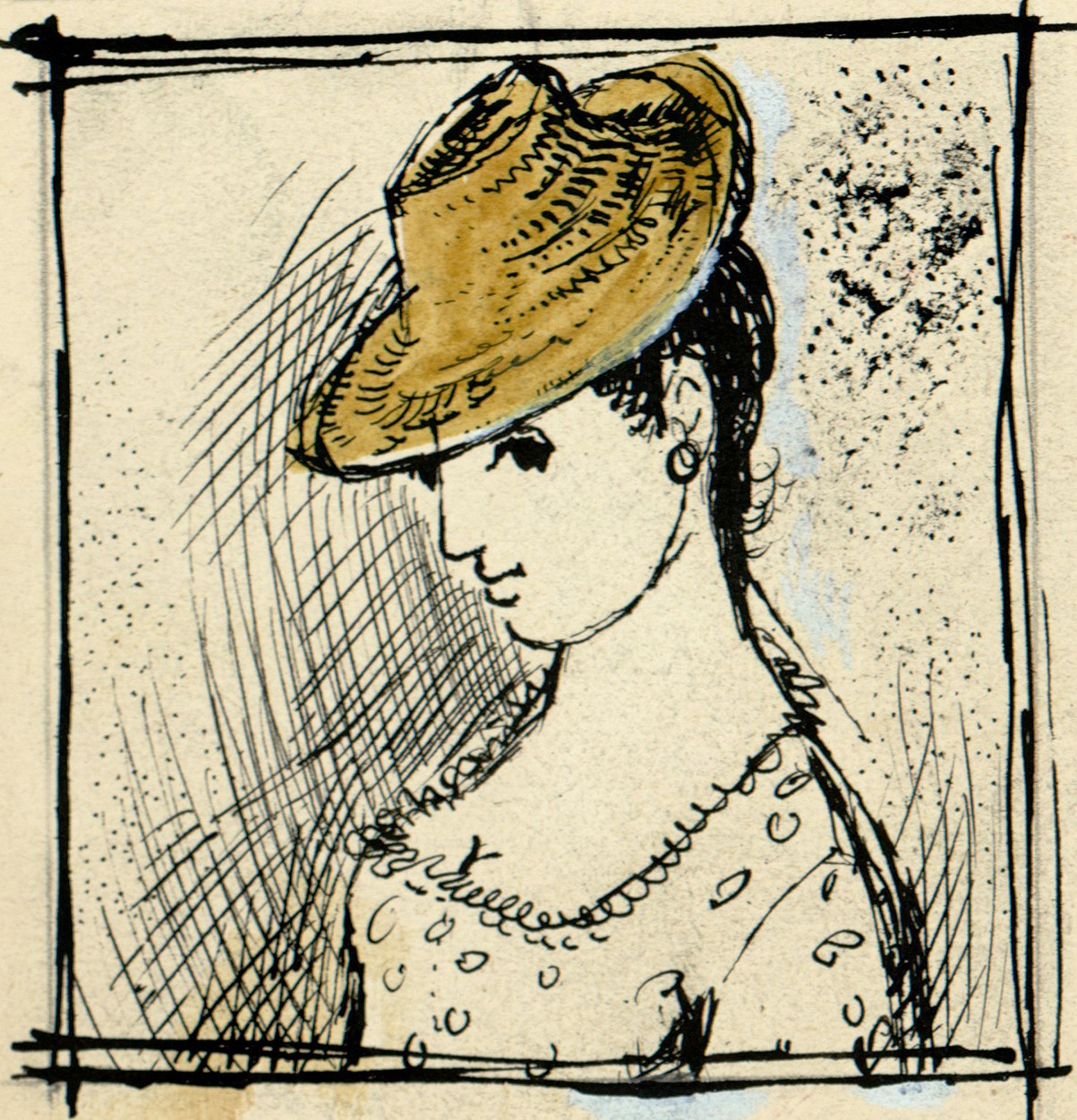
Drawing for Il cappello di paglia di Firenze (undated)

Il cappello di paglia di Firenze (The Florentine Straw Hat, usually titled in English language productions as The Italian Straw Hat) is an opera by Nino Rota to an Italian-language libretto by the composer and his mother, Ernesta Rota Rinaldi, based on the play Un chapeau de paille d'Italie by Eugène Labiche and Marc-Michel.

The opera premièred at the Teatro Massimo, Palermo, on 21 April 1955. The first performance in the United States was at the Santa Fe Opera in 1977, with Ragnar Ulfung as Fadinard, Ashley Putnam as Elena, Kathryn Day as Anaide, and Stephen Dickson as Emilio. The first New York City performance, starring Vincenzo Manno as Fadinard, took place in 1978. More recently, the opera was performed at the 2013 Wexford Festival, in Graz Opera in 2023, and at La Scala de Milán, 2024.

== Roles ==
Roles, voice types, premiere cast
| Role | Voice type | Premiere cast, April 21, 1955 Conductor: Jonel Perlea |
|---|---|---|
| Fadinard, a bridegroom | tenor | Nicola Filacuridi |
| Elena, Fadinard's bride | soprano | Ornella Rovero |
| Anaide, wife of Beaupertuis | soprano | Mafalda Micheluzzi |
| Emilio, Anaide's lover | baritone | Otello Borgonovo |
| Nonancourt, Elena's father | bass | Alfredo Mariotti |
| Felice, Fadinard's servant | tenor | Mario Ferrara |
| A milliner | soprano | Luisa Talamini |
| La Baronessa di Champigny | mezzo-soprano | Anna Maria Rota |
| Minardi, a famous violinist | spoken role | Carmelo Alongi |
| Beaupertuis, husband of Anaide | baritone | Guglielmo Ferrara |
| Vézinet, Elena's uncle | tenor | Renato Ercolani |
| Viscount Achille de Rosalba | tenor | Vittorio Pandano |
| A corporal of the guard | baritone | Leonardo Ciriminna |
| A guardsman | tenor | Caetano Crinzi |
Wedding guests, milliners, the Baroness's guests, guards

== Synopsis ==
Place: Paris
Time: 1850

=== Act 1 ===
Fadinard's house

The wedding day of Fadinard, a well-to-do young man, and Elena, the daughter of Nonancourt, a rich country bumpkin. Elena's deaf uncle, Vézinet, appears in Fadinard's house carrying a wedding present in a large cardboard box. Fadinard enters, still upset by the adventure he has just had: returning home by gig, his horse nibbled and gobbled down a Florentine straw hat which was hanging on a tree in the Vincennes woods. The owner of the hat, Anaide, appeared in a huff, accompanied by her husky escort, the officer Emilio. But the frightened horse set off at a gallop and swept his master home. As Fadinard waits for his bride, Anaide and Emilio unexpectedly appear and demand a hat exactly like the one the horse just ate.

At the sound of carriages announcing the arrival of the party of wedding guests, Anaide and her would-be escort run off and hide in the next room. The loutish Nonancourt enters with his daughter Elena, the sweet, innocent bride, railing at his son-in-law with the constant refrain "Tutto a monte" (It's all off). The interminable outburst ends in screams of pain at the agonizing tightness of his new pair of shoes. As the old man struggles to get out of them at least temporarily, Fadinard and Elena, alone for the first time, give way to their blissful happiness.

Meanwhile, the wedding party waiting impatiently in the carriages down in the street is heard singing: "Tutta Parigi noi giriam, lieti e felici siam."

Nonancourt goes down with his daughter, as Fadinard stays behind to try and get rid of the two intruders. The butler, Felice, who meanwhile has gone off to a milliner's with a scrap of straw as a sample to look for a hat of the same kind, comes back empty-handed. Anaide, bursting into tears, confesses that she cannot go home without the hat, for it was given to her by a "jealous and very brutal" husband. Fadinard, who is expected for his wedding, protests in vain: Anaide faints, Emilio threatens a duel. They refuse to budge from the house until Fadinard, even though he has to go and get married, comes back with a hat exactly like Anaide's.

=== Act 2 ===
Intermezzo: A milliner's shop

Fadinard, having visited countless shops without success, enters with the sample of straw. Nothing doing here either: the only straw hat like it was sold a few days before to the highly fashionable Baroness of Champigny. Fadinard sets off for the Baroness' villa in Passy with all the wedding procession trailing behind.

The Baronessa of Champigny's villa

A gala occasion in the luxurious home of the Baroness: flowers, tables laid for a feast, elegance, for a reception in honor of the distinguished Italian violinist Minardi, who is going to play. Fadinard, who enters shyly to ask for the hat, is mistaken by the Baroness for the famous violinist. Overcoming his initial embarrassment, Fadinard manages to pretend he is Minardi, and asks for her hat as a keepsake. Meanwhile, his father-in-law Nonancourt and the wedding guests have followed Fadinard in secret and enter the adjoining dining-room, convinced they are at the wedding banquet. The Baroness returns with a black hat. Fadinard heatedly flies off the handle and menacingly demands the florentine straw hat. Frightened, the Baroness says she has given it as a present to her god-daughter, Madame Beaupertuis.

At this point, the wedding guests, who have gorged and caroused, burst gaily into the room to everyone's astonishment, as Elena, slightly tipsy, lifts her glass in a toast to the groom. Amazement, panic, confusion. Minardi, the real violinist, arrives. Fadinard, having gotten the address where the unattainable hat is to be found, takes advantage of the confusion to carry off the whole wedding party with him, as the Baroness swoons and her guests cry "the police!".

=== Act 3 ===
Beaupertuis's house

Early in the evening, Beaupertuis is annoyed that his wife has not returned from a lengthy trip to the shops and suspects that she is having an affair. Fadinard arrives in search of the straw hat but fails to find it. Beaupertuis attempts to get Fadinard to leave his house, but he is unsuccessful.

Meanwhile, Nonancourt, Vezinet and the bridesmaids arrive, thinking they are in Fandinard's house. Elena is coaxed into what they believe to be the bridal suite. Fadinard soon realizes that Beaupertuis is Anaide's husband, after unknowingly revealing his plan to trick her. Beaupertuis confronts the intruders who finally realize they are in the wrong house. Chaos ensues.

=== Act 4 ===
Intermezzo: A Paris street

The bedraggled and exhausted wedding procession, with Nonancourt and his daughter, sings the same old refrain: "Tutta Parigi noi giriam", and sets out for Fadinard's house. It starts to rain.

Square with a guard-post in front of Fadinard's house

The wedding procession arrives with open umbrellas, soaking wet and exhausted. Nonancourt orders Felice, the butler, to give back all the wedding presents and the dowry: he is going straight back to Charantonneau with his daughter. But Elena, by now completely in love with her new husband, refuses to leave. Meanwhile, Fadinard comes running up all out of breath: Beaupertuis is about to arrive with the intention of shooting his wife who is up in his house. When Nonancourt hears there is another woman in his son-in-law's house his fury knows no bounds; he insists upon leaving at once with all his things. A tussle ensues, in which the deaf uncle, Vézinet, takes part in order to salvage the box containing his wedding present: a florentine straw hat! At the sight of the hat, Fadinard rejoices and runs into the house to get Anaide and give her the hat which has finally been found. The patrol guards return from their rounds only to find Nonancourt and his relatives about to leave with the bundles and parcels, and suspecting they are thieves, have them shut up in the guard-house.

When Fadinard comes out with Anaide and Emilio, the hat is no longer in the box: Nonancourt has carried it off. What to do? Emilio, the enterprising officer, rushes into the guard-post to recover the hat.

Meanwhile, Beaupertuis arrives in a carriage. An animated scene follows: Fadinard tries to hide Anaide from her husband, disguising her as a sentry. Emilio tosses the hat out of the window of the guard-post, and the hat remains dangling on the wire holding up the street-lamp. While Fadinard does everything possible to distract the attention of the fuming husband, Emilio manages to cut the wire with his sword: the lamp crashes to the ground along with the hat, plunging the square into pitch darkness. Hearing the racket, the guards come running, the people living on the square light lamps and peer out of their windows in their nightshirts.

But in the meantime, Anaide has donned the florentine straw hat triumphantly and comes forward, scolding her flabbergasted husband for his negligence. Nonancourt, who has heard of his son-in-law's good deed, appears in the window of the guard-post, shouting at last: "Everything's...settled!" Thanks to the good graces of the corporal, all the wedding guests are let out of the guard-post and embrace the beloved groom and deliver all over again. Beaupertuis, abashed and repentant, bows down to his wife and begs forgiveness, as everyone shouts: "She's got the hat, she's got the hat!"

The day of adventure is over. Everyone can go to bed and the newly married couple can finally enter their house...to rest.

== Films and recordings ==
Two movies of the opera have been made, both by RAI and initially for Italian television. Ugo Gregoretti shot the first in 1974 at Cinecittà; it was first broadcast in January 1975. Its celebrated soundtrack, recorded at RCA studios in Italy, was conducted by Rota himself and starred Daniela Mazzucato (Elena), Edith Martelli (Anaide), Viorica Cortez (Baronessa di Champigny), Ugo Benelli (Fadinard), Giorgio Zancanaro (Emilio), Alfredo Mariotti (Nonancourt), Mario Basiola (Beaupertuis). It was originally released by RCA and has more recently been available on the Ricordi label (catalogue number 74321551092, with Mazzucato's name misspelled). Copies of the Gregoretti movie itself, quite rare to find, make collector's items, though the movie is preserved and was screened as recently as 2009 in Italy for IRTEM members.

The second movie derives from a 1998 production at La Scala under the direction of Pier Luigi Pizzi. Bruno Campanella led a cast headed by Juan Diego Flórez, Elizabeth Norberg-Schulz, Francesca Franci, Alfonso Antoniozzi, and Giovanni Furlanetto.

=== Recordings ===
- live Brussels recording from 1976 conducted by Elio Boncompagni; Devia, Olivero, E. Giménez, Davià, and Socci sing the lead roles. Opera d'Oro
- Jerry Hadley, Paul Plishka, Marilyn Horne, Cheryl Studer, Thomas Allen, Anthony Laciura, Gino Quilico, Charles Anthony, Peter Kazaras, The Metropolitan Opera Orchestra and Chorus/ conducted by James Levine. 2CD Deutsche Grammophon 1988
- Piotr Buszewski, Tetiana Miyus, Anna Brull, Daeho Kim, Ivan Oreščanin, Antonia Cosmina Stancu, Dariusz Perczak, Martin Fournier, Mario Lerchenberger, Richard Friedemann Jähnig, Silvija Pleše, Veli-Pekka Varpula, Julian Gaudiano, Chor der Oper Graz, Bernhard Schneider, Grazer Philharmoniker, conducted Daniele Squeo. 2CD Capriccio 2023
