= C. William Harwood =

American conductor

C. William Harwood (March 14, 1948 – April 26, 1984) was an American conductor. Chiefly remembered for his work as an opera conductor, he notably conducted the Houston Grand Opera's groundbreaking 1977 national tour of George Gershwin's Porgy and Bess. He also conducted the world premieres of operas by Claude Debussy, Frederick Delius, Stephen Paulus, and George Rochberg.

== Life and career ==
Born in Richmond, Virginia, Harwood was a graduate of Yale University and the Berlin University of the Arts, Harwood began his career as the music director of the Yale Symphony Orchestra at Yale College from 1974–1977. There he also led performances of Mozart's Idomeneo, Piccinni's La buona figliuola, and the world premiere of Debussy's opera La Chute de la Maison Usher (based on Poe's The Fall of the House of Usher). He then served as director of the Houston Grand Opera's touring arm, the Texas Opera Theater, for two years; while simultaneously working as the associate conductor of the Houston Symphony. He notably led the HGO's groundbreaking 1977 production of Gershwin's Porgy and Bess. He later conducted performances of that opera at Radio City Music Hall in 1982.

In 1979 Harwood conducted the world premiere of Stephen Paulus' A Village Singer at the Opera Theatre of Saint Louis (OTSL). In 1981 he made his New York City conducting debut leading a concert by the American Symphony Orchestra, and that same year won the Leopold Stokowski Memorial Conducting Award. In June 1982 he led the world premiere of another opera by Paulus at the OTSL, The Postman Always Rings Twice; a work which he also conducted at the 1983 Edinburgh Festival. In August 1982 he conducted the world premiere of George Rochberg's Confidence Man at the Santa Fe Opera. In June 1983 he conducted the world premiere of Frederick Delius's Margot la Rouge at the OTSL.

Harwood died of viral pneumonia at the age of 36 in Little Rock, Arkansas. At the time of his death he was working as the music director of the Arkansas Opera Theater and was scheduled to join the conducting staff at the New York City Opera.
