= Howard Klein =

Howard Klein may refer to:

- Howard Klein (music critic) (born 1931), American music critic and pianist
- Howard Klein (TV producer), American television producer and talent manager
