= Genji monogatari (opera) =

Opera by Minoru Miki

Genji monogatari (The Tale of Genji) is an opera by the Japanese composer Minoru Miki, with the libretto by Colin Graham, based on the eponymous early 11th-century masterpiece of classical Japanese literature by Murasaki Shikibu. The opera was composed in 1999 and premiered in June 2000 at Opera Theatre of Saint Louis (OTSL) in the United States, with Graham directing the production. Cast members from the OTSL production participated in the Japanese premiere of the opera on 20 September 2001.

The story of the opera is principally derived from the first three books of the novel.

== Roles ==
- Old Emperor
- Fujitsubo
- Prince Genji
- Lady Rokujo
- To-no-Chujo
- Kokiden
- Aoi
- Suzaku
- Koremitsu
- Shonagon
- Old recluse of Akashi
- The lady of Akashi
