= Jōruri =

Jōruri (浄瑠璃) can refer to:

- Jōruri (music), a type of sung narrative with shamisen accompaniment, typically found in bunraku, a traditional Japanese puppet theatre
- Jōruri, a 1985 opera by Japanese composer Minoru Miki
- Jōruri-ji (浄瑠璃寺), a Buddhist temple in Kyoto

Jōruri is the Hepburn romanization of the Japanese (kanji) word. It is spelled Zyôruri in Kunrei-shiki Rōmaji (ISO 3602), and Zyōruri in Nihon-shiki Rōmaji (ISO 3602 Strict).
