= Stephen Lord (conductor) =

American conductor

Stephen Lord (born 1949) is an American conductor, specializing in opera. Praised in particular for his work with bel canto operas, Maestro Lord has enjoyed a distinguished career in North America and Europe. He has also served as an accompanist for many of the world's finest singers and is treasured for his work as a vocal coach.

Raised in Massachusetts, he is a 1971 graduate of Oberlin College.

In 1980, Lord joined OTSL as its head of music staff. He was named as artistic advisor to OTSL general director Richard Gaddes in 1983. In 1986, Lord made his formal OTSL conducting debut, and in 1991, became music director of OTSL. In November 2015, OTSL announced that Lord is to stand down from the OTSL music directorship after the 2017 season, and to take the title of music director emeritus.

Lord was music director and principal conductor at Boston Lyric Opera from 1991 to 2008. From 2011 to 2015, he was artistic director of the opera studies department at the New England Conservatory of Music. In November 2016, Michigan Opera Theatre (MOT) named Lord to the newly created position of principal conductor of MOT, with an initial contract through the 2018-2019 season, with immediate effect.

On June 18, 2019, the Twin Cities Arts Reader published an investigative exposé of alleged sexual harassment activities by Lord at several opera companies, consisting of "verbal and written sexual overtures" to multiple singers, conductors and pianists. The report was based on interviews with "more than two dozen individuals who made harassment claims" (all remaining anonymous in the article) as well as copies of electronic messages and corroborating statements from other parties. Lord resigned from Opera Theatre of Saint Louis and Michigan Opera Theatre the following day. but denied the allegations. Opera Maine (Portland, ME) removed Lord from their 2019 production of The Magic Flute around the same time. A review by The Detroit News found no lawsuits filed in the matter. The Opera Theatre of Saint Louis stated that "We have not received any complaints or reports of harassment against this company member at our organization, but [...] we will be conducting a full and thorough independent investigation into this matter." A representative of the agency Barrett Artists stated that they had never received a complaint while representing Lord for nearly 30 years. In February 2020, the Canadian Opera Company announced that Lord would lead its 2021 production of La traviata, defending the decision by arguing that "no complaints or records of misconduct were found in our files" in a "detailed review" of Lord's past engagements back to 1986, but reverted its decision the following month after protests by its staff and the public.

Cultural offices
Preceded by John Balme	Music Director, Boston Lyric Opera; 1991–2008	Succeeded by David Angus
Preceded by John Nelson (principal conductor)	Music Director, Opera Theatre of Saint Louis; 1991–2017	Succeeded by Vacant
Preceded by (no predecessor)	Principal Conductor, Michigan Opera Theatre; 2016–2019	Succeeded by Vacant
