= Boston Lyric Opera =

Non-profit organization in the USA

Boston Lyric Opera (BLO) is an American opera company based in Boston, Massachusetts, founded in 1976. BLO is the largest and longest-lived opera company in New England. BLO employs nearly 350 artists and creative professionals annually—vocalists, artisans, stagehands, costumers, and scenic designers—many of whom are members of the Boston community.

== Productions ==
Each season, BLO produces four mainstage productions in the Greater-Boston area, one of which is a featured new work. BLO receives partial funding from a grant from the Massachusetts Cultural Council. BLO regularly invests in co-productions with other U.S. companies including New York City Opera, the Opera Theatre of St. Louis, Houston Grand Opera, and Glimmerglass Opera.

BLO's community work has included participation in the "Egypt in Boston" thematic season that celebrated Egypt at several of Boston's leading cultural institutions in 1999–2000. In the summer of 2002, BLO produced "Carmen on the Common", a community-outreach initiative of a summer-long education series which culminated in two free, fully staged outdoor performances of Bizet's Carmen on Boston Common. Similar plans were scheduled for Verdi's Aida in the 2005–2006 season, but were cancelled because of insufficient financial support.

== Creative personnel ==
The conductor John Balme served as general director from 1979 to 1989. Janice Mancini Del Sesto was general director of BLO from 1992 to 2008, while Stephen Lord was BLO music director from 1991 to 2008. During that time, the company's budget grew from $800,000 (USD) to $6 million (USD). Since 2008, BLO's general and artistic director of BLO is Esther Nelson. In June 2010, BLO announced the appointment of David Angus as the company's next music director, as of the 2010–2011 season, and he continues to lead musically the company.

In 2009, John Conklin joined BLO as an artistic advisor and in 2012 Julia Noulin-Mérat joined as the associate producer. As of 2019, John Conklin has set designed 15 productions and Julia Noulin-Mérat has set designed 10 productions.

In 2010, BLO commissioned a work from composer Richard Beaudoin to precede its February 2011 performances of Viktor Ullmann's Der Kaiser von Atlantis. Beaudoin responded with a 20-minute work for singers and chamber ensemble.

In 2021, Esther Nelson and Julia Noulin-Mérat departed from Boston Lyric Opera.

== See also ==
- Opera Company of Boston
- Guerilla Opera
- Boston Opera Alliance
- Odyssey Opera
