= Charles MacKay =

American arts administrator (born 1950)

Charles MacKay (born May 1950, Albuquerque, New Mexico) is an American arts administrator, known for leadership roles at the Santa Fe Opera, Opera Theatre of Saint Louis, and Spoleto Festival USA/Festival of Two Worlds.

== Early experience ==
MacKay is the son of John and Margaret MacKay and an alumnus of Santa Fe High School and of the University of Minnesota. He played French horn in the Santa Fe Symphony, earning the first chair position while still in high school, and joined the orchestra of the Santa Fe Opera (SFO) at age 18. He was a volunteer with Santa Fe Opera at age 13 and began to work in administrative capacities with SFO at age 18, beginning with a job as the orchestra "pit boy." He worked at SFO as an orchestra librarian, in the business office, and painting stage scenery. MacKay also held several administrative positions with SFO, including box office manager, assistant orchestra manager, and business manager, the last position for 4 years.

== Spoleto Festival ==
After leaving Santa Fe, his other administrative positions include a 6-year tenure as director of finance and administration for the Spoleto Festival USA, from 1978 to 1984. For 5 years, he was the manager for the American artists at the Festival of Two Worlds in Spoleto, Italy.

== Opera Theatre of Saint Louis ==
In 1984, MacKay became executive director of Opera Theatre of Saint Louis (OTSL), recruited to the post by OTSL's first general director Richard Gaddes. In 1985, MacKay was named OTSL's second general director. During his tenure, MacKay presided over the growth of OTSL's endowment from US$682,000 to $18 million and maintained the company's record of never posting a deficit. He also raised funds for the construction of the Sally S. Levy Opera Center, the company's first permanent administrative facility, which was completed in 2006.

== Return to Santa Fe ==
In November 2007, SFO named MacKay as its third general director, succeeding Richard Gaddes and John Crosby. He concluded his OTSL tenure on 30 September 2008, and began his tenure as SFO general director on 1 October of that year. His immediate challenges were financial, in the wake of the 2008 financial crisis.

During his tenure, MacKay programmed several operas in their first stagings at Santa Fe Opera, including The Tales of Hoffmann (2010), Faust (2011), and in 2012 alone, The Pearl Fishers, Rossini's Maometto II (in a new critical edition), and Karol Szymanowski's King Roger. In 2013, Rossini's La donna del lago received its Santa Fe premiere in a co-production with the Metropolitan Opera. The 2014 season saw the first Santa Fe production of Beethoven's Fidelio. Additionally, MacKay's tenure has been characterized by working in collaboration with several opera companies across the United States on co-productions, some of which have been US or world premieres of new operas. In addition to the Met, these companies have included Minnesota Opera (Strauss' Arabella in 2012) and Opera Philadelphia (the Morrison / Cox Oscar in 2013.) SFO presented five world premieres during MacKay's tenure, including Cold Mountain by Jennifer Higdon and Gene Scheer (2015) and The (R)evolution of Steve Jobs by Mason Bates and Mark Campbell (librettist) (2018). MacKay also appointed Frédéric Chaslin and Harry Bicket successively as chief conductors of the company. In August 2017, Santa Fe Opera announced MacKay's intention to step down as its general director after the 2018 season.

== Arrest ==
On March 21, 2025, MacKay was arrested in Powell, Wyoming, for soliciting two teenage boys for sex. He was initially charged with breach of peace, but prosecutors later filed four felony charges, including sexual exploitation of a minor. MacKay was released on a $35,000 bond, with a preliminary hearing set for April 2. A spokesperson stated that MacKay was complying fully with the legal process and that he had been facing unspecified serious health issues. In December 2025, the charges were dropped but the record was sealed given the sensitive nature of the allegations.

== Other achievements ==
MacKay is a 1997 recipient of the Arts Management Career Service Award. He has served as chairman of the board of Opera America since 2004, and concluded his tenure in that post in June 2008. Other board affiliations include the Sullivan Foundation and the Edgar Foster Daniels Foundation. He was awarded honorary degrees (Doctor of Music) from the University of Missouri–St. Louis (1996) and from Indiana University (2018). In 2022, MacKay was inducted into the OPERA America Opera Hall of Fame.

Cultural offices
Preceded by Richard Gaddes	General Director, Opera Theatre of Saint Louis; 1985–2008	Succeeded by Timothy O'Leary
Preceded by Richard Gaddes	General Director, Santa Fe Opera; 2008–2018	Succeeded by Robert K. Meya
