= Jōruri (opera) =

Opera by Minoru Miki

- Opera by Minoru Miki
- Librettist: Colin Graham
- Based on: puppet theater by Monzaemon Chikamatsu
- Premiere: 30 May 1985; St. Louis

Jōruri is an opera by Minoru Miki to a Japanese-language libretto by the composer and was adapted from an original story and libretto by Colin Graham. It is the last of a trilogy of operas, following Shunkinshō (1975) and An Actor's Revenge (1979). Jōruri was created in 1985.

== Background ==
The term jōruri refers to a musical narrative developed in Japan in the 15th century. Over the years, it acquired several forms. By 17th century, puppeteers were added to the performance and the narrator became known as ningyō jōruri.

=== Miki's opera ===
Following the success of the American tour of the opera, An Actor's Revenge, the Opera Theatre of Saint Louis commissioned Miki to create Jōruri. The proposal for this opera was presented in London where An Actor's Revenge was being staged. It was agreed that, for this third opera in the trilogy, Miki would collaborate with Graham.

Jōruri, which includes Kabuki elements, was inspired by Monzaemon Chikamatsu's puppet theater. According to Graham, while it is not an adaptation of his puppet plays, it embodies some of his themes. The original play was also composed for music and modern theater, particularly for an intimate theatrical setting.

When it was staged in St. Louis, the cast included Faith Esham, John Brandstetter, Andrew Wentzel, and Mallory Walker. Joseph Rescigno was the conductor. Although the instrumental section included the Japanese musical instruments shakuhachi, twenty-string koto, and futo-zao shamisen, the score was arranged in such a way that it could also be staged using Western instruments. A New York Times review during its world premiere noted how the opera paid court to both European and Japanese cultures, travelling "wide artistic distances in its attempt to reconcile two very different ways of hearing and seeing".

== Story ==
The setting is 17th century Osaka, Japan. The story is a tale about loyalty and the pull of human emotions. It transpires in and around the house of Shojo, a celebrated puppet theater narrator and follows Yosuke, a young puppet master. Shojo, who is also a master of jōruri music has a devoted young wife, Otane, whom she saved from a magistrate. He was blinded as a punishment for intervening in her behalf. However, Otane has feelings for Yosuke, which is revealed during a quarrel in the opening scene. Shojo discovers that the young puppeteer is also in love with her when he traces the features of a bust that Yosuke carved for their new jōruri play. It is an exact likeness of Otane.

The story ends in tragedy. Yosuke and Otane commit suicide as the parallels between real-life and the new play written by Shojo prove too painful for the pair. They disappear into a waterfall.

== Roles ==
The characters of Jōruri are: Yosuke, a young puppet master; Shojo, a puppet theater leader; Otane, his young wife; and, a number of visitors that are to be played by the same tenor. In its world premiere at St. Louis, the roles were performed by the following:

Japanese	English	Voice type	Premiere cast, 30 May 1985 Conductor: Joseph Rescigno
おたね	Otane	soprano	Faith Esham
陽介	Yosuke	baritone	John Brandstetter
少女	Shojo	bass	Andrew Wentzel
歌舞伎	Kabuki roles	tenor	Mallory Walker
