= Tatjana Ječmenica (table tennis) =

Slovenian table tennis player (born 1949)

Personal information
- Full name: Tatjana Ječmenica
- Nationality: Slovenia, Serbia
- Born: 14 April 1949 (age 77) Banja Luka, SR Bosnia and Herzegovina; SFR Yugoslavia

Sport
- Sport: Table tennis
Medal record
Women's table tennis
Representing Yugoslavia
European Youth Championship (Junior)
Gold medal – first place	1966 Szombathely	Doubles
Bronze medal – third place	1966 Szombathely	Singles

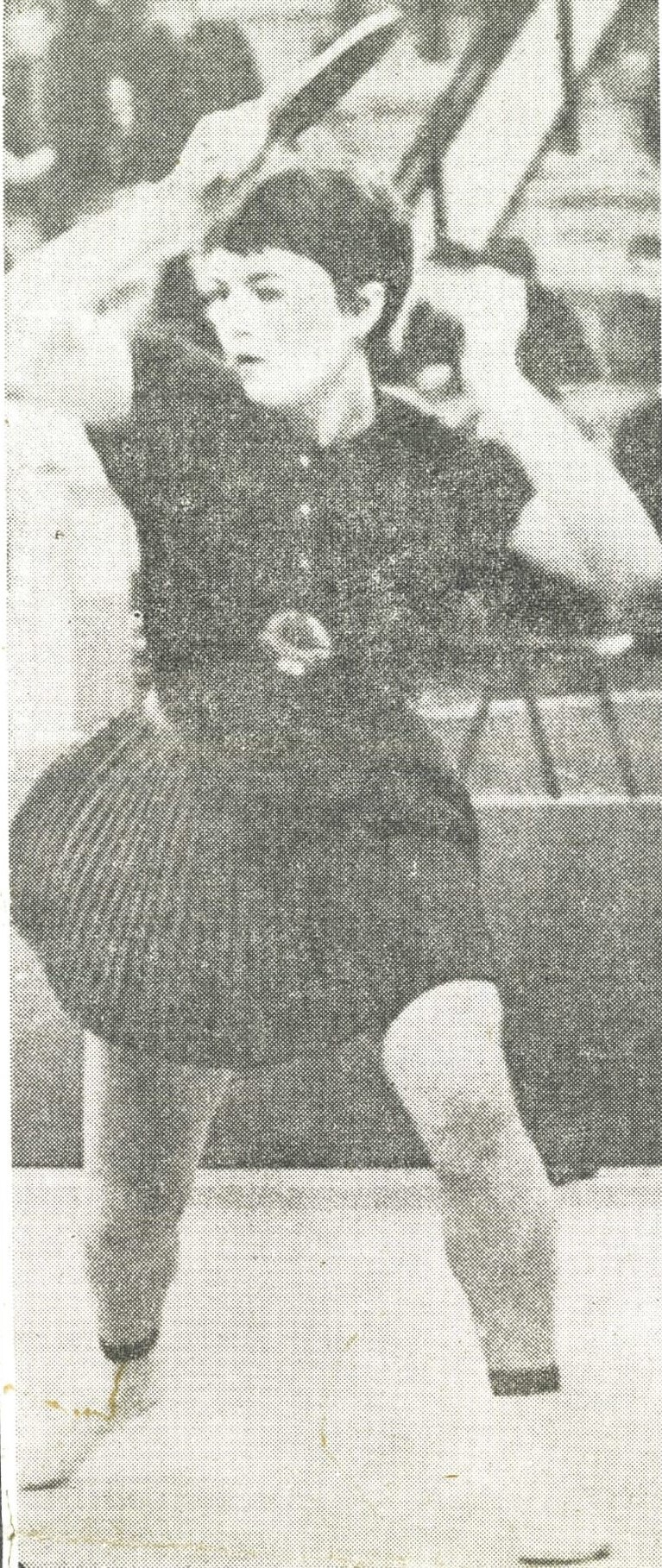
Tatjana Ječmenica, Table tennis player

Tatjana Ječmenica (born 14 April 1949 in Banja Luka, Bosnia and Hercegovina) is a former international table tennis player and coach from Serbia and Slovenia.

== Table tennis career ==
When she was less than 16 years old, Ječmenica competed in the 1965 World Table Tennis Championships, held in Ljubljana, Slovenia. She reached the third round in singles, while in mixed doubles with Istvan Korpa reached the fourth round and in team competition won eight place for the National team of former Yugoslavia.

Ječmenica played at the European Table Tennis Championships held in London in 1966. In singles she reached last 64, in doubles with Cirila Pirc reached last 32 and in mixed doubles with Istvan Korpa reached last 32.

In 1966 in Szombathely, Hungary, she played at European Youth Championship (Junior) and won doubles with Mirjana Resler. In singles she won the third place.

At X International Tournament, held In Ruse, Bulgaria, 1966, she won the 1st place women doubles with Cirila Pirc. Also in In 1966, Brasov, Romania, at Balkan Championship, in team event Jecmenica and Cirila Pirc won the 2nd place for former Yugoslavia national team.

Apart from mentioned tournaments Jecmenica played on many other international table tennis tournaments like London European Championship 1965, Paris International 1965, Berlin 1966, Magdeburg 1966, Prague 1966 etc.

In 1966 and 1967 she played at the European Champions Cup as a member of STK Novi Sad with Radmila Stojšić and Sonja Skakun. In both competitions she reached the quarter-finals.

Jecmenica won four National Champion titles, three in woman doubles with Radmila Stojšić, in 1966, 1967 and 1968, and one in mix doubles with Istvan Korpa in 1965. She won two National titles in womans team competitions in 1966 and 1967. Also, in 1964 and 1965, as a junior player she won two Junior National titles in singles competitions.

Ječmenica played 53 times for the National Team of former Yugoslavia. In 1965 she received the award as the most successful junior sportsman of the city of Novi Sad, Yugoslavia. In 1966 Tatjana was announced as the best junior sportswoman of the year. She finished her competitive sport career at the age of 19. Later she continued to contribute to Table Tennis sport through the sports association. She volunteered as a coach in Bergkvara, Sweden and Maribor, Slovenia.

== Family ==
Ječmenica has got two daughters. The younger one Daniela Candillari is a conductor and a composer of serious music. She lives and works in New York
