= Leigh Gerdine =

American college president (1917–2002)

- Born: June 22, 1917; Sheyenne, North Dakota
- Died: March 1, 2002 (aged 84)
- Education: University of North Dakota; Lincoln College, Oxford; University of Iowa
- Occupations: Educator, Musician
- Employer(s): Washington University in St. Louis; Webster University; Opera Theatre of Saint Louis
- Known for: President of Webster University
- Spouse: Alice Strauch Meyer (m. 1961)
- Military career
- Allegiance: United States
- Branch: United States Air Force
- Rank: Captain
- Conflicts: World War II
- Awards: Croix de Guerre; Bronze Star Medal; German Occupation Medal

Leigh Gerdine (22 June 1917 - 1 March 2002) was an American musician and educator, he was called "the spiritual father of the arts in St. Louis." A Rhodes Scholar, he served as President of Webster University and founded the Opera Theatre of Saint Louis.

== Early life ==
Gerdine was born on June 22, 1917, in Sheyenne, North Dakota. He began playing the piano around age 8 and later played the saxophone in high school.

== Education ==
Gerdine received a Bachelor of Arts degree from the University of North Dakota in 1938. He attended Lincoln College, Oxford as a Rhodes Scholar, from which he received a bachelor's degree in music in 1940. In 1941, he completed his doctorate at the University of Iowa. He was inducted into Phi Beta Kappa, Phi Eta Sigma, and the Blue Key honor societies.

Gerdine subsequently studied piano in London with Louis Kentner for two years.

== Military service ==
During World War II, Gerdine served in the U.S. Air Force. He enlisted as an aviation cadet but subsequently went into the intelligence service. He served as aide to General John K. Cannon and was decorated with the French Croix de Guerre, Bronze Star Medal and German Occupation Medal.

== Career ==
Gerdine began his teaching career as an associate professor of music at Mississippi State College for Women.

In 1948, Gerdine joined the faculty of Miami University in Oxford, Ohio. While at Miami University, he served as the executive secretary of the music department.

Gerdine joined the Arts and Sciences at Washington University in St. Louis as head of the music department in 1950. During his time at Washington University, Gerdine also served as director of the St. Louis Civic Chorus and as president of the Musicians' Guild.

In 1970, Gerdine joined Webster University as president. He oversaw a large increase in the student population at Webster in his tenure. Attendance at the university increased from 1,300 in 1970 to 10,000 in 1990, the year of his retirement. The Leigh Gerdine College of Fine Arts at Webster University was named in his honor.

== Opera Theatre of Saint Louis ==
In 1976, Gerdine co-founded the Opera Theatre of Saint Louis. Its young opera artist program, Gerdine Young Artists, was named in his honor.

== National Medal of the Arts ==
In 1989, Gerdine was awarded the National Medal of Arts by George H. W. Bush in recognition of his distinguished career as a musician and educator and for his enlightened patronage of the arts in St. Louis.

== Death ==
On March 1, 2002, Gerdine died of an apparent heart attack at the age of 84.
