= Adam Klein (tenor) =

American opera singer (born 1960)

Adam Charles Josef Klein (born January 22, 1960) is an American opera singer who has sung leading tenor roles with many North American opera companies including, the Metropolitan Opera, Seattle Opera, Edmonton Opera, and New York City Opera.

== Biography ==
Klein was born in Port Jefferson, New York, the son of pianist Howard Klein, a music critic at The New York Times in the 1960s, and Director for Arts at the Rockefeller Foundation in the 1970s and 1980s and Patricia Windrow, a realist painter. Klein entered the Metropolitan Opera Children's Chorus at age ten, and in 1972 sang two solo parts, Yniold in Pelleas et Melisande and Zweiter Knabe in The Magic Flute, before his voice changed. A graduate of the State University of New York at Stony Brook, he went on to receive a master's degree in vocal performance from Jacobs School of Music at Indiana University. Until he returned to opera in his twenties, he had built a career making and playing folk instruments such as banjo, dulcimer, autoharp and bones, a pursuit that he has never completely abandoned.

In the late 1990s, he began performing on the opera stage as a tenor, singing Pinkerton in Madama Butterfly, Rodolfo in La bohème, Edgardo in Lucia di Lammermoor for Edmonton Opera. He made his New York City Opera debut in 1995 as Don José in Carmen, a role he has also sung at Atlanta Opera, Virginia Opera, Toledo Opera, Indianapolis Opera, Portland Opera Repertory Theatre, as well as in Milwaukee, Boston, Philadelphia and several other American cities. Klein returned to the Metropolitan Opera in 2001 when he made his house debut as a tenor on 26 November, singing Count Elemer in Arabella. In the succeeding nine years he has performed 62 times with the company in 10 different operas. Although most of his performances there have been in comprimario roles such as Yaryshkinin in The Nose, Chevalier de la Force in Dialogues of the Carmelites, and Fyodor in War and Peace, he also sang Steva in Jenůfa (2002) and The Witch in Hansel and Gretel (2008).

In 2007, Klein sang the role of Sly in the American premiere of Pascal Dusapin's opera Faustus, the Last Night at the Spoleto Festival USA. Three years later, he made his house debut with Seattle Opera, as Tristan in Tristan und Isolde when he substituted for an indisposed Clifton Forbis. Klein's previous Wagnerian roles had been Erik, Loge, and Siegmund. He made his Nickel City Opera debut in 2012 as Rudolfo in La Bohème. With other opera companies, Klein's Puccini roles have included Cavaradossi, Luigi, and Des Grieux. In the Verdi repertoire, he has sung Alfredo, the Duke of Mantua, Manrico, Cassio and Otello, while his Mozart roles include Tamino and Belmonte. Among his other roles are Bacchus in Ariadne auf Naxos, Herod in Salome, Peter Quint in The Turn of the Screw, the title role in Peter Grimes, Judge Danforth in The Crucible, Polo in Marco Polo, Edgardo in Lucia di Lammermoor, and Canio in Pagliacci.

Klein is married to Tami Swartz, a singer, actress, and director. His brother Moondi Klein is a bluegrass singer, arranger, guitarist who performs with Jimmy Gaudreau in the duo, Jimmy and Moondi.
