= Erie Mills =

American operatic soprano (1953–2026)

- Born: June 22, 1953; Granite City, Illinois, U.S.
- Died: June 23, 2026 (aged 73)
- Occupation: Opera singer (soprano)

Erie Ann Mills (June 22, 1953 – June 23, 2026) was an American operatic soprano and voice teacher. Over the course of her career she performed on many of the prominent opera stages in the world, including Wiener Staatsoper, the English National Opera, the Metropolitan Opera, and La Scala.

== Early life ==
Mills was born in Granite City, Illinois on June 22, 1953. From a young age she studied dance and performed as a singer for local veterans organizations. She later remarked, "When I was five, I thought I was going to be Shirley Temple." In her youth she performed as part of the children's chorus of the St. Louis Municipal Opera and attended Interlochen Center for the Arts. Mills was active in high school extra curricular activities, including cheerleading, band, and community theater.

She studied voice at the College of Wooster under Karl Trump. In her junior year, Mills saw the Metropolitan Opera on tour in Cleveland and realized "opera is where I wanted to be." She continued her studies at the University of Illinois with Grace Wilson and David Lloyd before joining the Houston Opera Studio, where she studied with Elena Nikolaidi.

== Professional career ==
In 1978 Mills appeared as Nannetta in Verdi's Falstaff at the Houston Grand Opera. The following season she sang Ninetta in Prokofiev's L'amour des trois oranges at the Chicago Lyric Opera.

In 1980 she returned to the role of Nannetta at Opera Theatre of St. Louis before a double turn at the San Francisco Opera as Die Fiakermilli in Arabella and as Norina in Don Pasquale. Mills sang the role of L'Amore at San Francisco Opera in L'incoronazione di Poppea in 1981. The same year she performed in Bach's Jauchzet Gott at the Mostly Mozart Festival in New York.

Director Harold Prince cast Mills as Cunegonde in his 1982 "opera house" version of Leonard Bernstein's Candide for the New York City Opera, conducted by John Mauceri. Her performance garnered significant notice, dubbed "a first night favorite" by the UPI. Mills reprised her role in 1986; the production was recorded and aired on US television.

1983 saw Mills appear with the Vienna Symphony Orchestra in Mozart's Der Schauspieldirektor and as Marie in the Des Moines Metro Opera production of La fille du régiment. The following year she appeared as Carolina in Il matrimonio segreto by Cimarosa at Santa Fe Opera.

Mills made her debut at La Scala in 1984, singing the role of Giunia in Mozart's Lucio Silla.

In 1985 Mills reprised her role in La fille du régiment, this time at the New York City Opera, conducted by Joseph Rescigno. She performed as the "ghost" of Young Heidi in a star-studded concert version of Stephen Sondheim's Follies. The cast featured Barbara Cook as Sally, George Hearn as Ben, Mandy Patinkin as Buddy, and Lee Remick as Phyllis, with Licia Albanese as Mills's older counterpart and Carol Burnett as Carlotta.

1987 was a banner year for Mills: Follies in Concert was awarded the Grammy Award for Best Musical Theater Album and Mills herself received a Grammy as a named artist on the Best Opera Recording of the year, Candide. She returned to Santa Fe Opera as Aminta in Richard Strauss's Die schweigsame Frau (repeating the role in 1991) before singing Zerbinetta in Ariadne auf Naxos at Wiener Staatsoper (reprising in 1990 and 1991). In November of 1987 she made her Metropolitan Opera debut as Blondchen in Mozart's Die Entführung aus dem Serail.

She continued her association with Santa Fe Opera, appearing in Richard Strauss's Capriccio and as Atalanta in Handel's Serse (both in 1993), as Anna in another Strauss opera, Intermezzo (1994), and La fille du régiment (1999). In 1997 she returned to La fille du régiment at Cleveland Opera and to Ariadne auf Naxos, this time at the English National Opera.

In 1998 Mills began working at Milwaukee's Florentine Opera, first as Konstanze in Die Entführung aus dem Serail (also at Opera Columbus), then as Sibyl Vane in the American premiere of Dorian Gray and in the title role of Manon, both in 1999. She continued to perform in the early 2000s, appearing in Giulio Cesare in Egitto at Utah Festival Opera & Musical Theatre (2000), in Rigoletto as Gilda at Opera Columbus (2001), and remounting her role in Intermezzo at Santa Fe Opera (2003).

In 2001 Mills received ecstatic notices for her performance as Miss Havisham in Miss Havisham's Fire at the Opera Theatre of St. Louis. In his review for the New York Times, Paul Griffiths wrote, "Ms. Mills is the star the vehicle was waiting for."

== Career transition ==
In 1998 Mills joined the music faculty of San Jose State University. She retired in 2008, though she continued to teach privately. She also worked as an English diction coach for Opera Theatre of St. Louis and Santa Fe Opera.

From 2004 to 2010, Mills was a board member of Opera America, the first singer appointed to the position. Mills was a peer review panelist for Philadelphia's Pew Center for Arts & Heritage. From 2016 until her death she served as the artistic director of Livermore Valley Opera.

In 2022 Mills was recognized as a Distinguished Artist by The American Prize.

== Personal life and death ==
Mills met physicist Thomas N. Rescigno while working on a production of La fille du régiment conducted by his brother, Joseph. The couple married in 1986. Rescigno worked at the Lawrence Berkeley National Laboratory, and the couple resided in the San Francisco Bay Area from the 1980s onwards.

Mills died on June 23, 2026, at the age of 73.

== Discography ==
- Follies in Concert - RCA Red Seal (1985)
- Candide (New York City Opera) - New World Records (1986)
- Handel: Muzio - Newport Classic (1992)
- Scarlatti: Ishmael - Newport Classic (1993)
- Erie Mills: Always It's Spring - VAI Audio (1997)
