= Margherita Chabran =

Italian operatic soprano

Margherita Chabran (born 1780?) was an Italian operatic soprano. Her last name is sometimes given as Chabrand or Chambrend, and later as Chabrand-Albani.

Chabran was a pupil of Felice Pellegrini. She passed her career largely in Naples between 1802 and 1820; a principal soprano at the Teatro dei Fiorentini until 1816, in that year she became a principal soprano at the Teatro di San Carlo, where she remained until 1818. On 24 April 1816 she sang Teti in the world premiere of Gioacchino Rossini's cantata Teti e Peleo; on 26 September that year she was the first Lisetta in his La gazzetta.
