= Sōju Nosaka II =

Japanese koto player (1938–2019)

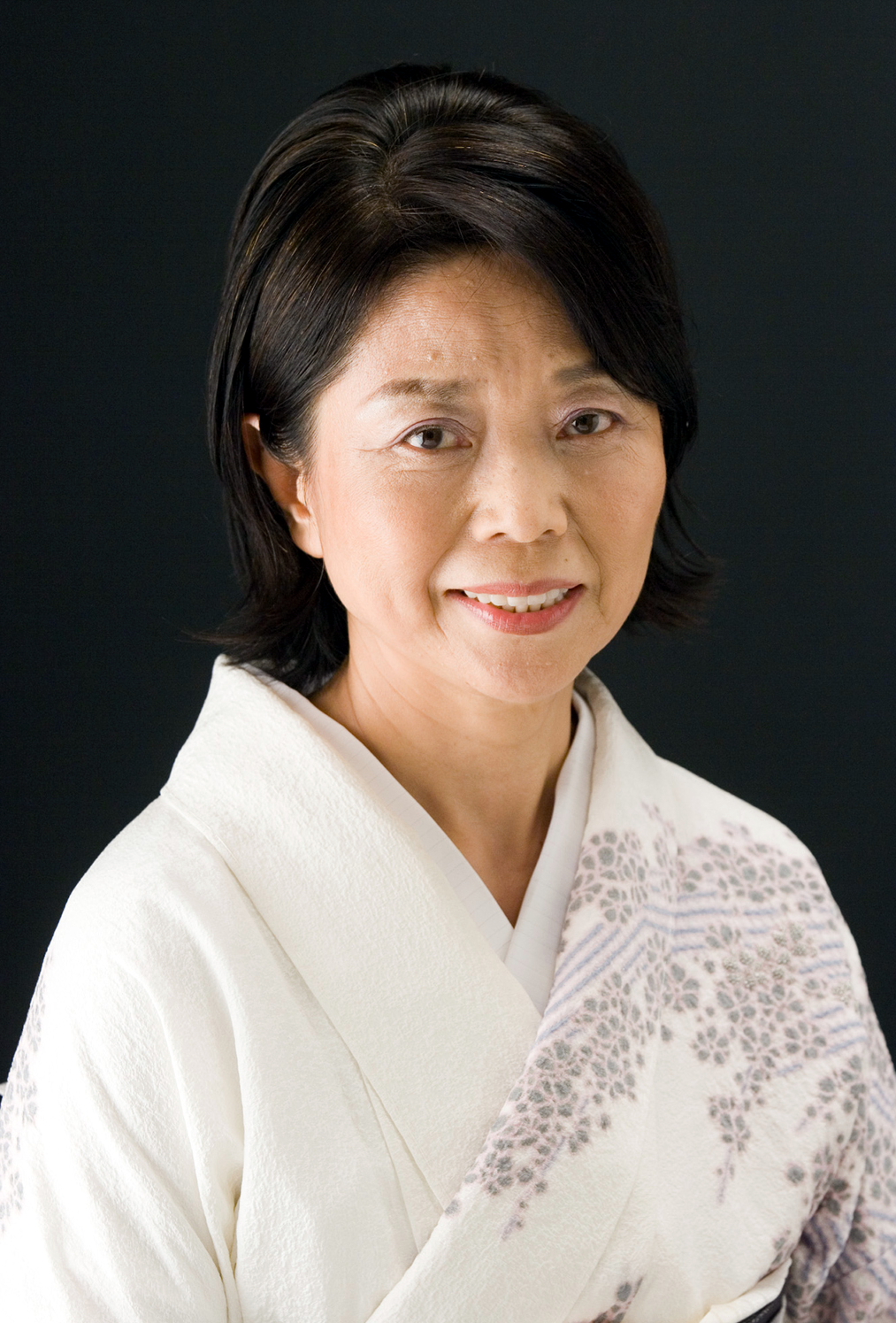
Sōju Nosaka II

Sōju Nosaka II (二代目 野坂 操壽, Nidaime Nosaka Sōju, May 6, 1938 – August 27, 2019) was a prominent Japanese koto player, specializing in contemporary music. Her real name was Keiko Nosaka (野坂 恵子, Nosaka Keiko).

== Overview ==
Nosaka was born on May 6, 1938, in Tokyo.

She was known for her work with the 20-string (nijū-gen) and 25-string bass kotos, which she helped to develop. The Japanese composers Minoru Miki and Akira Ifukube composed for her.

Nosaka joined the Pro Musica Nipponia ensemble in 1965, continuing as an active member for 17 years. She released several CDs.

In 2003, she adopted the name Sōju, the 2nd, after the death of her mother, the first Sōju.
