= PORTopera =

American opera company

Opera Maine (formally PORTopera) is a professional opera company based in Portland, Maine. Opera Maine is a 501(c)(3) nonprofit organization that, in addition to performing operas, supports young professional singers, and provides education programs to expose K-12 students to opera.

== History ==
Founded in 1994, Bruce Hangen served as Opera Maine's Artistic Director until 2003; at which time, Dona D. Vaughn took over the position, which she still holds. The company made its home at Portland's State Theater until moving to Merrill Auditorium in 1997. Besides Hangen, who before founding the company had led the Portland and Omaha Symphony Orchestras, conductors who have worked with Opera Maine include Giovanni Reggioli, Stephen Lord and present conductor Israel Gursky. Among the singers who have performed with the company are Mary Dunleavy, Kate Aldrich and James Morris. In addition to the principal company, Opera Maine also produces the Studio Artist Program, founded in 1996.

== Repertoire ==
The company's initial offering, in July 1995, was a production of Carmen with Donna Ames as Carmen and Adam Klein as Don José. In addition, Opera Maine has presented French opera, Italian operas by Mozart, along with his German opera, Der Schauspieldirektor; and American works, such as Gian Carlo Menotti's The Medium in 2000. The Studio Artist Program has presented two rarely performed works: Bizet's Dr. Miracle in 2002 and Mozart's L'Oca del Cairo in 2006.

== Studio Artist Program ==
Opera Maine offers a Studio Artist Program (formerly known as the Young Artist Program) giving professional singers new in their careers opportunities to perform complete operas since 1996. Participants are also cast in roles in Opera Maine's mainstage productions. Under the stewardship of program director Richard Gammon, the program presents contemporary operas. In recent years, the Opera Maine Studio Artist Program (OMSAP) has presented Rappahannock County, Paul's Case, and Bound. Richard Gammon is currently the stage director for SAP alongside conductor Lance Inouye.

== Opera for All ==
Opera for All is a program offered by Opera Maine providing educational opportunities to K-12 students and community members across the state of Maine. In partnership with the University of Southern Maine, Opera for All sends Outreach Artists, USM music students, to visit schools and provide opera education to K-12 students. Opera for All also provides free tickets to people 21 and under.
