= La gazzetta =

Rossini opera

- Opera buffa by Gioachino Rossini
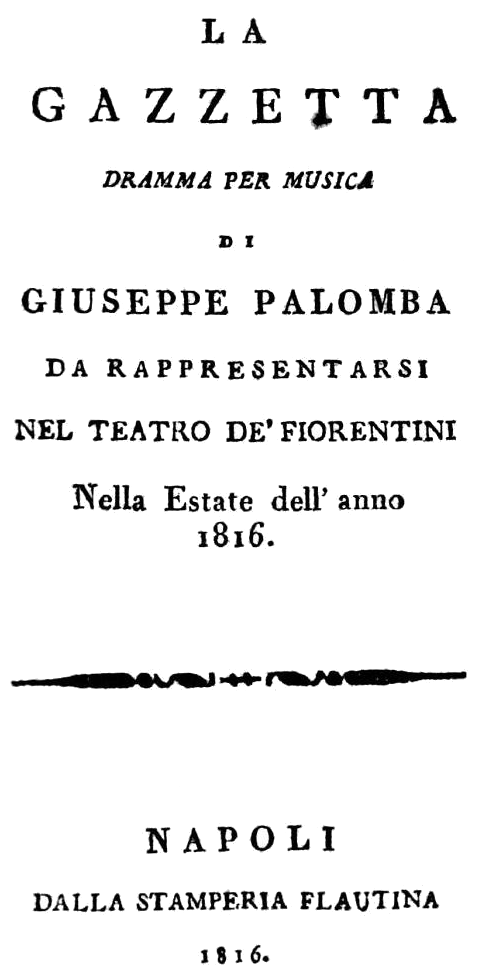
- Title page of the libretto, Naples, 1816
- Librettist: Giuseppe Palomba
- Language: Italian
- Based on: Carlo Goldoni's Il matrimonio per concorso
- Premiere: 24 September 1816; 210 years ago Teatro dei Fiorentini, Naples

La gazzetta, ossia Il matrimonio per concorso (The Newspaper, or The marriage contest) is an opera buffa by Gioachino Rossini. The libretto was by Giuseppe Palomba after Carlo Goldoni's play Il matrimonio per concorso of 1763. The opera satirizes the influence of newspapers on people's lives. There is critical disagreement as to its success, although the New England Conservatory's notes for their April 2013 production state that the opera "was an immediate hit, and showed Rossini at his comic best".

== Composition history ==
Following the success of his Il Barbiere di Siviglia in Rome, the composer arrived in Naples in February 1816 to discover that fire had destroyed the Teatro San Carlo, that he was obliged to compose a cantata to celebrate a royal wedding, plus supervise a production of his Tancredi. And the music for La gazzetta was due for August performances. It would be Rossini's second opera written for Naples and the only comedy he wrote there.

As was his wont, Rossini borrowed music from some of his previous works, These included Il Turco in Italia (1814), La pietra del paragone (1812), and also from Torvaldo e Dorliska (1815). None of these pieces would have heard by Naples' audiences of the time. However, musicologist Philip Gossett stresses that:

We need to be careful about assuming a mechanical use of self-borrowing by the composer.[...] Like Handel before him, Rossini was not averse to borrowing from himself, when he felt a piece would not be known widely or when he felt that he could introduce new material into it. But Rossini was always a composer, and he would not easily take a passage and employ it without rethinking its function in a new musical and dramatic context.

While the overture was written specifically for this opera, it is probably the best known piece from the work, because, along with other music from La gazzetta, it was incorporated into La Cenerentola. These borrowings may have sped up the process of composition, but Charles Osborne notes that "on this occasion, Rossini failed to complete the opera with his usual alacrity" and speculates that it may have been caused by his attraction to the soprano Isabella Colbran. It opened a month later than originally scheduled.

== Performance history ==
19th century performances

The opera was first performed on 26 September 1816 at the Teatro dei Fiorentini in Naples, where it ran for 21 performances. Osborne would appear to disagree, since he notes that "after a few performances it was withdrawn, the general opinion being that its libretto was clumsy and its music undistinguished."

Following the initial performances there was only one revival of the opera in the 19th century, when it was performed during the 1828 Carnival in Palermo.

20th century and beyond

While Osborne does not mention a revival in 1828, Philip Gossett's recent work would seem to support its existence. But, as Osborne notes, the opera did not re-appear until a 1960 Italian radio performance and a staging in Vienna by the Vienna Chamber Opera in 1976.

The UK premiere was given by the Garsington Opera in Oxfordshire on 12 June 2001, with the first performances of the new critical edition prepared by Fabrizio Scipioni and Philip Gossett which, at that time, did not contain the act 1 quintet. La gazzetta was presented by the Rossini Opera Festival in Pesaro that summer and Pesaro repeated it during the summer of 2005, directed by Dario Fo. Because the quintet "was just identified in the Spring of 2012, after the librarian at the Palermo Conservatory, Dario Lo Cicero, found the manuscript [so] in Pesaro [and all other productions prior to 2013], the stage director, Dario Fo, arranged something else for the spot where the Quintet should have gone." Fo's production for Pesaro was later presented at the Gran Teatre del Liceu in 2005. This production has been recorded on DVD. It was also given by the Rossini in Wildbad Festival.

The American premiere of not only the critical edition but the newly found act 1 quintet of La gazzetta was presented by the New England Conservatory between 6 and 9 April 2013 in Boston, the first time since the 19th century that the opera was given in its complete form. Prior to the performances, Dr. Gossett led two panels at the Conservatory.

The first professional presentations of the critical edition of the opera containing the recently found quintet were presented at the Opéra Royal de Wallonie in Liège in Belgium in June 2014.

The opera was also given at the Royal College of Music in London in late June 2014.

A new production of the opera was presented at the Rossini Opera Festival in Pesaro in August 2015, when the chorus and orchestra of the Teatro Comunale di Bologna were conducted by Enrique Mazzola

In 2018, Pacific Opera Project presented the West Coast premiere of La gazzetta in Highland Park, Los Angeles. It was directed by Josh Shaw and conducted by Brooke deRosa, who created a ten-instrument reduction of the score and reconstructed the missing Act One Quintet for the production.

== Roles ==
Role	Voice type	Premiere Cast, 26 September 1816 (Conductor: - )
Don Pomponio	bass	Carlo Casaccia
Lisetta, his daughter	soprano	Margherita Chambrend
Filippo, an innkeeper, in love with Lisetta	baritone	Felice Pellegrini
Alberto, a wealthy young man	tenor	Alberigo Curioni
Doralice, in search of a husband	soprano/mezzo-soprano	Francesca Cardini
Anselmo, her father	bass	Giovanni Pace
Madama La Rose	mezzo-soprano	Maria Manzi
Monsù Traversen, an old roué	bass	Francesco Sparano

== Synopsis ==
Time: 18th century
Place: Paris

The opera tells the story of a pretentious Neapolitan, Don Pomponio Storione, who travels the world in search of a husband for his daughter, putting ads in the newspapers. He arrives in a city, and after a series of ridiculously inadequate suitors, such as the Quaker Monsù Traversen or the waiter at the hotel, who usually end up beating poor Pomponio, he finally resigns to let his daughter marry her lover, the only suitor he seems to consider inappropriate.

== Music ==
Borrowings from earlier operas

As has been noted, Rossini borrowed melodic fragments from some of his previous works. These include a quintet from largest musical contributor, Il Turco in Italia (1814), as well as other pieces, such as a second-act trio from La pietra del paragone (1812), plus a Largo from Torvaldo e Dorliska (1815). All would have been unknown to audiences in Naples.

The lost Quintet

Musicologist Philip Gossett, who oversaw the preparation of the critical edition in 2002 and who, in 2012, identified music found in Palermo as belonging to the opera (in fact, it was the lost act 1 quintet) discussed the preparation for the US premiere performances in an interview in The Boston Globe:

A close examination of the music of the quintet opens a window onto Rossini’s creative process. It is in three parts, the first of which seems to have been newly composed for La Gazzetta. The second and third parts both make use of music from other operas, La Scala di Seta and Il Barbiere, respectively. Yet in each case the material is reworked and refashioned, so that the results have audible roots in the earlier works yet also sound new and different.

What the quintet shows, Gossett said, is that even when he plunders his own work, Rossini isn’t mechanically repeating himself. Instead, "he’s paying attention to the details of this particular performance of this piece." With the quintet restored, and a large hole in the opera now closed, Gossett is confident that La Gazzetta is now musically complete. He noted that since today’s listeners are less troubled by the self-borrowing, "I think that it is an opera that is easy for a viewer to understand and appreciate — much more now than it may have been in the 19th century."

The lost Quintet and the critical edition

In an essay originally published in German in the Rossini studies journal, Gossett describes the evolution of the Quintet:

At the time Fabrizio Scipioni and I prepared the critical edition of La gazzetta, it seemed as if Rossini had not prepared a major ensemble in the first act, a Quintet for Lisetta, Doralice, Alberto, Filippo, and Don Pomponio, that is, for all the principal characters in the opera, whose text was printed in the original libretto of the opera. The piece was absent in all sources known of the opera. It was not in Rossini's autograph manuscript, nor in secondary manuscripts nor in the printed edition of the score that Schonenberger published in Paris in 1855, followed by Ricordi in Milan in 1864. The critical edition accepted the comments made by Marco Mauceri in his brilliant study of the opera, and assumed that Rossini had not composed the Quintet, or at least had not allowed it to be performed. That there was a considerable amount of recitative leading up to the Quintet text, following the Cavatina Lisetta (No. 4), and before the Aria Doralice (No. 5), was a result of the absence of the Quintet. In any event, Rossini did not prepare any recitative in the entire opera, assigning that task, instead, to two associates, but no setting whatsoever had been found for the scenes present in the original printed libretto, leading up to the Quintet (Scenes vi, vii, and viii of the opera, the latter actually continuing with the text of the Quintet).

He continues by noting the absence of music for the Quintet, in spite of the presence of the text in the printed libretto: "[The libretto] was "without the "virgolette" which generally indicate that a passage of text was not set to music by the composer."

Then he notes other factors:

First, there is a remark in a review of the opera from the Giornale delle Due Sicilie that Felice Pellegrini was particularly effective in a "Quintet of the first Act"

Gossett continues by saying that maybe the reviewer was mistaken "since the Finale I opens with a Quintet of voices", suggesting, then, that the reviewer had mixed them up. The second issue concerns the misbinding of "the Recitative after the Quintet [....] in Rossini's autograph manuscript of the opera. It is found in the second act [...] where it makes no sense whatsoever."

To get around this problem, Gossett suggests that:

the critical edition tried to adjust the music and drama while making the smallest number of interventions possible. It suggested that Don Pomponio could learn the true situation by overhearing several conversations. Scene vi, which the edition considered crucial for the drama, was set to music by Philip Gossett. But no effort was made to prepare a version of the Quintet or its introductory recitatives.

Next, in discussing performance practice, Gossett states that:

these minimal solutions were not widely adopted. In the first performances [...] at the Rossini Opera Festival [...], the stage director, Dario Fo, preferred to have the characters declaim the verses of the Quintet [to a piano accompaniment from another work]. [...The] Wildbad festival [in 2007] commissioned Stefano Piana [...] to compose anew the lacking recitative and the Quintet. [He] noted, quite correctly, that Rossini frequently introduced a major ensemble in the middle of the first act of a comic opera, so that the absence of the piece in La gazzetta is very noticeable. [Piana justifies] beginning his reconstruction with a passage taken from Rossini's later opera, La Cenerentola. We know, after all, that the overture to La gazzetta passed without change into La Cenerentola. Why should not this also have happened with the first section of the Quintet from La gazzetta? [...]Certainly, given our knowledge in 2007, Mr. Piana's reconstruction and article made very good sense.

But we now know much better, thanks to the identification of the original autograph manuscript of the Quintet, which was found last year in the Conservatory of Palermo by Dario Lo Cicero, librarian of that collection, and was subsequently identified by myself [...] Unfortunately, only the autograph manuscript of the Quintet itself is found in Palermo: the preceding recitative, [...] essential in a performance of the opera, still exist in no contemporary source.

Gossett continues by noting that he has now revised the critical edition with the new-found discoveries and states:

What we learn from the piece itself is that many of the assumptions the editors of the original critical edition and of Mr. Piana turned out to be false.

What can we learn from this experience? First of all, we learn that we should be hesitant about claiming that Rossini did not write a passage of music, particularly one which serves both a dramaturgical and a musical function, as this Quintet from La gazzetta does, until we have explicit proof that he omitted the passage when he set the composition to music.[...] Finally, we learn that Rossini manuscripts can turn up even in unexpected places. We must continue to be on the lookout for musical manuscripts of Rossini, even in collections we thought we knew about.

Premiere performances which included the lost quintet

When La gazzetta was given its American premiere on 6 April 2013, it was conducted by Joseph Rescigno. Singing (and sharing) the major roles were Conservatory students Leroy Y. Davis and Kyle Albertson as on Pomponio. His daughter Lisetta was sung by sopranos Bridget Haile and Soyoung Park and the baritone role of Filippo, the innkeeper, was shared between Jason Ryan and David Lee. The tenors Marco Jordao and James Dornier sang the role of Alberto.

== Recordings ==
Year	Cast: Storione, Lisetta, Filipo, Doralice	Conductor, Opera House and Orchestra	Label
1987	Franco Federici, Gabriella Morigi, Armando Ariostini, Barbara Lavarian	Fabio Luisi, Orchestra Sinfonica di Piacenza and the Coro Francesco Cilea (Recorded in the Teatro Chiabrera di Savona, 14 November 1987)	Audio CD: Bongiovanni; Cat: GB 2071/72-2
2001	Bruno Praticò, Stefania Bonfadelli, Pietro Spagnoli, Marisa Martins	Maurizio Barbacini, Orchestra Giovanile del Festival di Pesaro and the Prague Chamber Chorus (Recorded at the Rossini Opera Festival Pesaro, August 2001)	Audio CD: Rossini Opera Festival; Cat: ROF 10043
2005	Bruno Praticò, Cinzia Forte, Pietro Spagnoli, Marisa Martins	Maurizio Barbacini, Gran Teatro del Liceo Orchestra and Chorus (Video recording of a performance in the Gran Teatro del Liceo)	DVD:- Opus Arte; Cat: OA 953D
2007	Marco Cristarella Orestano, Judith Gauthier, Giulio Mastrototaro, Rossella Bevacqua.	Christopher Franklin, Naples San Pietro a Majella Conservatory Chorus, Czech Chamber Soloists. (Recording of a performance at the Wildbad Rossini Festival, 2007)	Audio CD: Naxos Records; Cat: 8.660277-78
2016	Enrico Maria Marabelli, Cinzia Forte, Laurent Kubla, Julie Bailly	Jan Schultsz, Opéra Royal de Wallonie orchestra and chorus	Audio CD:Dynamic; Cat:CDS7742
