= Daniela Candillari =

American orchestra conductor

- Born: 1979 (age 46–47); Novi Sad, Serbia
- Occupation: Orchestra conductor
- Spouse: Nick Schwartz
- Website: danielacandillari.com

Daniela Candillari, born in 1979 in Novi Sad, Serbia (then Yugoslavia), is an American orchestra conductor specializing in contemporary opera. She has been principal conductor at Opera Theatre of Saint Louis since 2022.

== Early life and education ==
Candillari was born in 1979 in Novi Sad, Serbia, then part of the non-aligned Socialist Federal Republic of Yugoslavia. Her mother is table tennis player Tatjana Ječmenica.

Candillari's grandmother, a successful opera singer and voice coach, taught her to play arias, and she became interested in learning piano. While she started training for piano at age 5, she felt that she didn't want to be a concert pianist. She moved to the city of Maribor in Slovenia in 1992 and had to learn Slovenian. She bypassed high school and entered university at age 15. From the Universität für Musik in Graz, she earned first a bachelor's then a master's degree in Piano Performance. Later, from the Universität für Musik in Vienna, she earned a PhD in musicology.

Candillari started working as a pianist at Indiana University. She undertook the Jazz program there as that was her interest. Then she auditioned for the opera department and began work there as a vocal coach. Candillari subsequently received a master's degree in jazz studies under a Fulbright Scholarship from Indiana University.

== Career ==
In 2021 Candillari debuted at Opera Theatre of Saint Louis (OTSL) with a premier named "New Works, Bold Voice Lab". She was made principal conductor at OTSL in 2022.

In 2022, Candillari conducted her first major ensemble at the Lyric Opera of Chicago for a contemporary opera by Terence Blanchard called Fire Shut Up in My Bones.

The September 2023 Philadelphia premiere of 10 Days in a Madhouse by Rene Orth saw praise for Candillari's conducting.

In 2025, Candillari conducted her first performance at the Chicago Symphony Orchestra featuring Pergolesi’s Stabat Mater.

She has also conducted at the Deutsche Oper Berlin, the Kansas City Symphony, the Louisiana Philharmonic Orchestra, the Metropolitan Opera, the Music Academy of the West, the New Orleans Opera, the Opera Ballet Vlaanderen, the Royal Liverpool Philharmonic, the Tucson Symphony Orchestra, and the Washington National Opera.

== Personal life ==
Candillari lives in New York with husband Nick Schwartz, who plays trombone for the New York City Ballet.
