= The Postman Always Rings Twice (opera) =

1982 opera

- Opera by Stephen Paulus
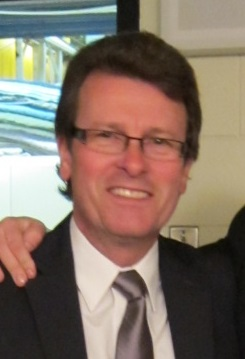
- The composer
- Librettist: Colin Graham
- Language: English
- Based on: The Postman Always Rings Twice by James M. Cain
- Premiere: 1982; Opera Theatre of St. Louis

The Postman Always Rings Twice is a 1982 opera with a libretto written by Colin Graham and music by Stephen Paulus, based on the 1934 novel by James M. Cain, The Postman Always Rings Twice.

The opera was the first of four commissioned from Paulus by the Opera Theatre of St. Louis. It opened to generally strong reviews, and prompted the critic from the New York Times, in an otherwise mixed notice, to call Paulus "a young man on the road to big things".

The opera has since been performed numerous times around the world, and Paulus composed eight more operas before his death in 2014.

== Roles ==
Role	Voice type	Premiere cast, 17 June 1982 (Conductor: C. William Harwood)
Cora	soprano	Kathryn Bouleyn
Katz	tenor	Carroll Freeman
Nick	tenor	Michael Myers
Kennedy	baritone	David Evitts
1st Cop	baritone	David Evitts
2nd Cop	bass-baritone	Stephen Morton
Frank Chambers		David Parsons
Sackett	bass	Daniel Sullivan

== Synopsis ==
The story is of a drifter, Frank, who stops at a rural diner for a meal and ends up working there. The diner is operated by a young, beautiful woman, Cora, and her much older husband, Nick. Frank and Cora have an affair. Cora and Frank scheme to murder Nick to start a new life together without her losing the diner. Their first attempt at the murder is a failure, but they eventually succeed.
