= John Balme =

American conductor, opera manager and pianist

John Balme (born 1946) is an American conductor, opera manager and pianist. He served as general director of Boston Lyric Opera from 1979 to 1989 and the Lake George Opera Festival from 1988 to 1992. He was also music director of the Liederkranz Foundation of the City of New York with a 15-year tenure from 1984 to 1998. He has participated as conductor, assistant conductor, and/or producer in over 300 productions and has appeared as a guest conductor throughout the United States. He is best known for producing and conducting the complete Ring Cycle of Richard Wagner for the Boston Lyric Opera in Boston and New York City in 1982 and 1983.

His extensive performance history includes works by Mozart, Wagner, Strauss, Puccini, and Verdi, as well as operas such as Dialogues of the Carmelites, Der Zigeunerbaron, Der Freischütz, The Rake's Progress, and Die Tote Stadt.

As a pianist, Balme has accompanied many singers, including recital performances with singers such as Carlo Bergonzi, Nicholai Gedda, Jerome Hines, and Deborah Voigt. He has also served as production accompanist for singers such as Beverly Sills, Shirley Verrett, and Jon Vickers.

He has conducted at opera companies throughout the US and the world, including Hawaii Opera Theatre, San Diego Opera, Welsh National Opera, Chautauqua Opera, Fort Worth Opera, Augusta Opera, Shreveport Opera, and Opera Theatre of Rochester. He was the manager of opera in New England from 1977 to 1978 and production coordinator for the San Diego Opera from 1978 to 1979.

John Balme collaborated with Scott Brummit to found Longwood Opera in 1986 to give locally based performers a chance to establish themselves as professional artists. He was the director at Longwood Opera from 1986 to 1992.

== Background ==
John Balme is the son of David Mowbray Balme, the original principal, and helped establish the University of Ghana. He attended Oxford University, the Royal College of Music, the Eastman School of Music, and Indiana University. Balme has served on the faculties of the University of Texas at Austin, the University of Connecticut, New England Conservatory of Music, and Northeastern University.

He is married to operatic soprano Cynthia Springsteen, who also worked for the Children's Opera Chorus and had vocal training from Armen Boyajian. John Balme was the director of music ministry for St. Michael's Roman Catholic Church in Long Branch's West End, New Jersey, he is now music director for Christ Episcopal Church in Middletown, New Jersey and is director of Concordia Chorale, a chamber choir with performances around the world, and maintains a teaching studio for piano, violin, viola, and other instruments in Belford, New Jersey.
