= Colin Graham =

British stage director (1931–2007

Colin Graham OBE
- Born: 22 September 1931; Hove, England
- Died: 6 April 2007 (aged 75); St. Louis, Missouri, United States
- Education: Stowe School; Royal Academy of Dramatic Art
- Occupations: Stage director of opera, theatre, and television

Colin Graham OBE (22 September 1931 in Hove, England – 6 April 2007 in St. Louis, Missouri) was a stage director of opera, theatre, and television.

== Biography ==
Graham was educated at Northaw School (Hertfordshire), Stowe School and the Royal Academy of Dramatic Art (RADA). Early in his career, he began a long association with Benjamin Britten, for whom he directed all but one of the composer's stage works, including all of the world premieres after 1954. Graham became associated with the English Opera Group in 1953. In the 1950s, he also worked for the Royal Opera House, Covent Garden in London and later at Glyndebourne and at the English National Opera in the 1970s. In the late 1950s and early 1960s, Graham was associated with several recordings of Gilbert and Sullivan operas conducted by Sir Malcolm Sargent with the Glyndebourne Festival Chorus and principals including George Baker. He enhanced these recordings with movement for the performers that makes the recordings sound more like a live staged performance.

Graham made his American debut as a stage director at Santa Fe Opera in 1974 with his staging of Britten's Owen Wingrave. In 1978, Graham started his long association with the Opera Theatre of Saint Louis (OTSL) when he became its Director of Productions. In 1985, he became OTSL's Artistic Director, a position he kept until his death twenty-two years later. Also in 1985, Jōruri had its global premiere at OTSL. The opera was a collaboration with Minoru Miki.

Graham directed the world premieres of John Corigliano's opera, The Ghosts of Versailles, for the Metropolitan Opera; The Dangerous Liaisons and André Previn's A Streetcar Named Desire for San Francisco Opera; The Song of Majnun for Lyric Opera of Chicago; and a series of three operas by Miki Minoru. In addition, he directed productions for the Santa Fe Opera, notably Bright Sheng's Madame Mao in 2003, continuing his association with general director Richard Gaddes, which had begun during the latter's tenure at OTSL. Collectively, he directed 55 world premieres of operas.

Graham also wrote libretti for several operas, including:

- Benjamin Britten, The Golden Vanity
- Richard Rodney Bennett, Penny for a Song
- Stephen Paulus, The Postman Always Rings Twice, 1982
- Minoru Miki, Jōruri
- Minoru Miki, The Tale of Genji, 1999
- Bright Sheng, Madame Mao, 2003
- David Carlson, Anna Karenina, 2007

In the US, Graham studied theology and became a minister in 1987, and ultimately took US citizenship. He received the Order of the British Empire in 2002. At the time of his death, Graham was at work on the premiere production of Anna Karenina for Florida Grand Opera and OTSL. He left no survivors.

== See also ==
- List of opera directors
