= Minoru Miki =

Japanese composer and artistic director (1930–2011)

- 三木 稔
- Born: 16 March 1930; Japan Tokushima
- Died: 8 December 2011 (aged 81)
- Occupation: Composer
- Website: www.m-miki.com/index_e.html

Minoru Miki (Japanese: 三木 稔, 16 March 1930 – 8 December 2011) was a Japanese composer and Artistic director. He was known for promoting Japanese, Chinese and Korean traditional instruments as well as some of their performers.

In his catalogue these traditional instruments figure solo or in various types of ensembles, with and without Western instruments. His catalogue demonstrates a large stylistic and formal diversity including operas and other kinds of stage music; orchestral, concerto, chamber and solo music, as well as music for films. His work has found international recognition placing Miki in the company of other celebrated Japanese composers such as Tōru Takemitsu.

Minoru was a pioneer in the composition of contemporary classical music for large ensembles of traditional Japanese musical instruments. In 1964, he founded the Nihon Ongaku Shūdan (Pro Musica Nipponia ensemble), also known as Ensemble Nipponia, for which he has composed extensively.

== Biography ==
Minoru was born in Tokushima on March 16, 1930. His first musical experiences were of the traditional music of this region. He had no formal music education before moving to Okayama for high school. Here he first encountered European classical music. From there, he moved to Tokyo, graduating from the Tokyo University of the Arts in 1964. In that same year, Miki founded Pro musica Nipponia (日本音楽集団), an orchestra of traditional Japanese instruments for which he would compose a large amount of work. He also began collaborating with koto virtuoso Keiko Nosaka, developing the 20-string koto and reviving the instrument's repertoire with many new works in various genres and combinations. This included five concertos for koto and orchestra.

In 1975 Minoru composed his first opera, Shunkinsho, based on Jun'ichirō Tanizaki's novel of the same name. Interest in Japanese traditional music by members of the English Music Theatre Company led to the commission of Ada, An Actor's Revenge after Otokichi Mikami. Written by Minoru, this was an opera in two acts to an English libretto by James Kirkup which opened in London in October 1979.

Ada premiered in London in 1979 and was one of the last works commissioned and performed by the EMTC before its ultimate disbandment in 1980. During this period, Minoru developed a relationship with director Colin Graham that was to last until Graham's death in 2007. The most notable result of this collaboration was the opera Jōruri which was commissioned by Graham for the Opera Theatre of Saint Louis, premiering in 1985.

With his 1992 work Wakahime, Minoru adopted a pan-Asian perspective, incorporating music and instruments from a number of Asian countries into his compositions and collaborating with a number of Asian artists. Some of Miki's operas from thereon – mostly notably Wakahime and Aien – also increasingly dealt with episodes of Japan's presence and interaction with its neighboring Asian countries. This recurring theme was often performed on stage and incorporated the traditional instruments of these neighbouring countries.

Miki died of sepsis at Mitaka city hospital, Tokyo, during the early hours of December 8, 2011.

== Works ==
=== Operatic cycle on Japanese history (日本史オペラ連作) ===
- Shunkinshō (春琴抄) (1975)
- Ada, An Actor's Revenge (あだ) (1979); piano score by Geoffrey Tozer
- Jōruri (じょうるり) (1985)
- Wakahime (ワカヒメ) (1991)
- Shizuka to Yoshitsune (静と義経) (1993)
- The River Sumida / Kusabira (隅田川／くさびら) (1995)
- Genji monogatari (The Tale of Genji; 源氏物語) (1999)
- Ai-en (愛 怨) (2005)
- The Happy Pagoda (幸せのパゴダ) (2010)

=== Other operas ===
- The Monkey Poet (うたよみざる) (1983)
- Yomigaeru (よみがえる) (1986–1992)
- Terute and Oguri (照手と小栗) (1993)

=== Ballet ===
- From the Land of Light 光の国から

=== Orchestral ===
- Trinita sinfonica (1953)
- Symphony Joya (1960)
- Symphony from Life (1980)
- Beijing Requiem for string orchestra (1990)
- MAI 舞 (1992)

=== Concertante ===
- Marimba Concerto (1969)
- Eurasian Trilogy 鳳凰三連 (1969; 74; 81), Japanese and Western instruments
- Koto Concerto No. 1 (1974); this piece is also the second movement of Eurasian Trilogy
- Koto Concerto No. 2 (1978)
- Koto Concerto No. 3 (1980); aka Concerto Requiem
- Koto Concerto No. 4 (1984); aka Pine Concerto 松の協奏曲
- Koto Concerto No. 5 (1985)
- Z Concerto (1992), marimba and percussion soli
- Pipa Concerto (1997)
- Requiem 99 (1998); marimba solo, orchestra of Japanese traditional instruments
- Trio Concerto (2000), shakuhachi, pipa, 21-koto soli, orchestra of Japanese instruments
- Shakuhachi Concerto (2002), aka Lotus Concerto

=== Chamber music ===
- Piano Sextet (1965), fl, ob, cl, bn, hn, pf
- Piano Trio (1986), pf, vn, vc
- String Quartet (1989)
- Marimba Spiritual (1983), marimba solo with percussion trio

=== Solo ===
- Time for Marimba, (1968), marimba
- Ballades for koto (I-Winter, 1969; II-Spring, 1976; III-Summer, 1983; IV-Autumn, 1990)

=== Film music ===
- On the Road: A Document (ドキュメント路上 Dokyumento rojō) (1964); directed by Noriaki Tsuchimoto
- In the Realm of the Senses 愛のコリーダ (1976); directed by Nagisa Oshima

=== Vocal ===
- Shirabe, 4 songs for tenor and harp (1979)
- Requiem (1963), baritone solo, male chorus, orchestra
- The Mole's Tale (1966), male chorus, 2 perc.

=== Written ===
- Miki, Minoru (2008). Flavin, Philip (ed.). Composing for Japanese instruments. Translated by Regan, Marty. Rochester, New York: University of Rochester Press. ISBN 9781580462730.
