= Vincenzo Manno =

American opera singer (1949–2018)

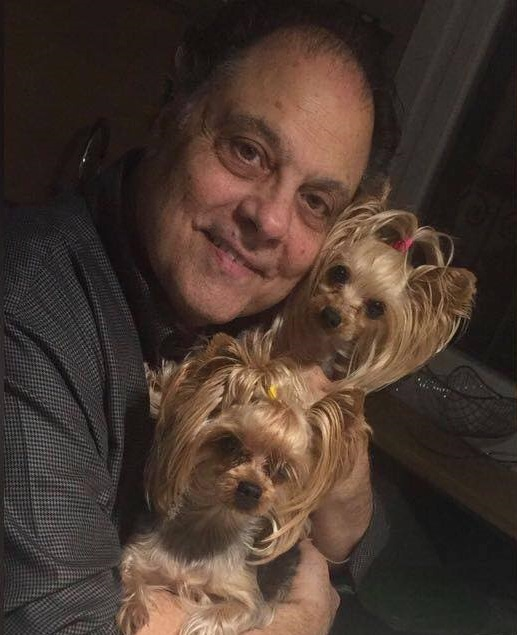
Vincenzo Manno with his dogs.

Vincenzo Antonio Manno (January 19, 1949, Cleveland, Ohio – May 9/10, 2018, Bergamo) was an American tenor opera singer and voice teacher. He was of Italian descent.

== Education ==
He completed his music studies in 1970 at Oberlin College under the tutelage of Richard Miller having previously studied with John Shurtleff and Burton Garlinghouse while attending the Cleveland Music School Settlement and summer courses with Josephine Antoine at Chautauqua and Eleanor Steber at the Cleveland Institute of Music in Cleveland, Ohio. Thanks to a Fulbright fellowship, Manno continued his studies at The Academy of Santa Cecilia in Rome with Maestro Gennaro D'Angelo and at Giuseppe Verdi Conservatory in Milan, with Maestro Ettore Campogalliani. His private studies in Milan continued with Dr. Otto Mueller. After Dr. Mueller's death, Manno was accepted into the private singing school directed by Professor Dennis Hall in Bern, Switzerland. Professor Hall remained Manno's voice teacher and mentor until Hall's death in 2004.

== Singing career ==
His singing career embraced a wide repertory of baroque, traditional, and modern pieces. He performed in theatres all over the world, and on radio primarily in Europe.

He was a permanent member of the La Scala Opera Chorus in Milan and performed regularly there until his retirement in 2009.

== Teaching career ==
He regularly held seminars and master classes on singing and style. He was called to teach at the Academy for Young Singers affiliated with the La Scala Opera, while under the directorship of the world-renowned soprano, Leyla Gencer, then at the Scuola Civica di Musica 'Claudio Abbado' in Milan, and at the Accademia Donizetti in Masate, Italy, where he was invited to teach vocal technique. He was also a guest teacher outside of Italy, teaching interpretation, staging scenes and full-length operas for young singers. He delivered the keynote address at the 20th National Professional Development Conference, sponsored by the New Zealand Association of Teachers of Singing (NEWZATS) at Queen Margaret College in Wellington, New Zealand and he took part in numerous discussions as guest speaker.

While in New Zealand Manno gave master classes at the Universities of Otago and Waikato as well as private lessons. Maestro Manno was a frequent adjudicator for vocal performance competitions around the world.

Maestro Manno taught English diction to the prestigious La Scala Opera Chorus for the La Scala debut of Benjamin Britten's “Death in Venice” (having already done so at the Teatro Carlo Felice in Genoa) and was immediately reconfirmed for the world premiere of Luca Francesconi's new opera “Quartett”.

Maestro Manno's students can be heard regularly around the world in the major opera houses, on recordings, in concert halls, and on radio and television. His students include Thiago Arancam, Allan Rizzetti, Leonardo Cortellazzi.

Maestro Manno died after a long battle against cancer.

== Awards ==
He is the recipient of several awards for his recordings, among them the "Grand Prix du Disque" for baroque music, recorded with Swiss conductor Maestro Edwin Loehrer, and the "Best Recording of the Year", from Gramophone Magazine, for his two-CD solo recording of tenor music of the 17th century, Strana Armonia d’Amore, with Maestro Roberto Gini.

Because of his devotion to divulging musical culture, on May 3, 2007, Vincenzo Manno was honoured with a tribute by the United States Congress, for the 40th Anniversary of his career.
