= Stephen Paulus =

American composer (1949–2014)

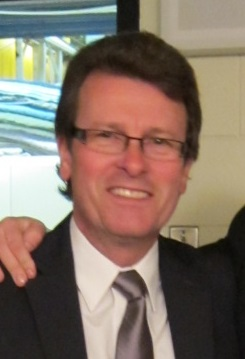
- Paulus in 2011
- Born: August 24, 1949; Summit, New Jersey, U.S.
- Died: October 19, 2014 (aged 65); Arden Hills, Minnesota, U.S.
- Education: Macalester College, University of Minnesota
- Occupation: Composer
- Notable work: The Postman Always Rings Twice, To Be Certain of the Dawn, Pilgrims' Hymn

Stephen Paulus (August 24, 1949 – October 19, 2014) was an American Grammy Award winning composer, best known for his operas and choral music. His style is essentially tonal, and melodic and romantic by nature.

His best-known piece is his 1982 opera The Postman Always Rings Twice, one of several operas he composed for the Opera Theatre of St. Louis, which prompted The New York Times to call him "a young man on the road to big things." He received grants from the National Endowment for the Arts and Guggenheim Foundation and won the prestigious Kennedy Center Friedheim Prize. He was commissioned by such notable organizations as the Minnesota Opera, the Chamber Music Society of Lincoln Center, Opera Theatre of Saint Louis, the Saint Louis Chamber Chorus, the American Composers Orchestra, the Dale Warland Singers, the Harvard Glee Club and the New York Choral Society.

Paulus was a passionate advocate for the works and careers of his colleagues. He co-founded the American Composers Forum in 1973, the largest composer service organization in the U.S., and served as the Symphony and Concert Representative on the ASCAP Board of Directors from 1990 until his death (from complications following a stroke in July 2013) in 2014.

== Biography ==
Paulus was born in Summit, New Jersey, but his family moved to Minnesota when he was two. After graduating from Alexander Ramsey High School in Roseville, MN, he attended Macalester College, graduating in 1971. He then attended the University of Minnesota, where he studied with Paul Fetler and eventually earned a PhD in composition in 1978. By 1983, he was named the composer-in-residence at the Minnesota Orchestra, and in 1988 he was also named to the same post at the Atlanta Symphony Orchestra, whose then-conductor Robert Shaw commissioned numerous choral works from Paulus for Shaw's eponymous vocal ensemble. After the premiere of his second opera, The Postman Always Rings Twice, he began a fruitful collaboration with the Opera Theatre of St. Louis that would result in four more operas. In 1997, he was awarded the Brock Commission from the American Choral Directors Association.

In a career which encompassed more than forty years of composition his output came to include over 450 works for chorus, orchestra, chamber ensemble, opera, solo voice, piano, guitar, organ, and band. Paulus lived in the Twin Cities area.

On July 4, 2013, Paulus suffered a stroke. He died from medical complications on October 19, 2014, aged 65.

== Major works ==
Paulus's output was eclectic and varied, incorporating works for chorus, orchestra, solo singer, and various combinations thereof. His choral music represented his most diverse body of work, ranging from elaborate multi-part works like Visions from Hildegard to brief anthems and a cappella motets.

With nearly sixty orchestral works to his credit, Paulus was distinguished by his tenures as a Composer in Residence with the orchestras of Atlanta, Minnesota, Tucson and Annapolis. Conductors who have premièred his works include Rollo Dilworth, Christoph von Dohnányi, C. William Harwood, Sir Neville Marriner, Kurt Masur, Leonard Slatkin, and Osmo Vänskä. He has been commissioned by the Cleveland Orchestra, New York Philharmonic, Atlanta Symphony Orchestra, Minnesota Orchestra, Tucson Symphony Orchestra, Saint Paul Chamber Orchestra, and many others. In 2011 he also co-wrote a Concerto "Timepiece" with his son, Greg Paulus, for the Minnesota Orchestra.

Paulus has written over 150 works for chorus ranging from his Holocaust oratorio, To Be Certain of the Dawn, recorded by the Minnesota Orchestra on the BIS label, to the poignant anthem, "Pilgrims' Hymn," sung at the funerals of U.S. Presidents Ronald Reagan and Gerald Ford and a setting of the Stabat Mater for the Saint Louis Chamber Chorus. His works have received thousands of performances and recordings from such groups as the New York Choral Society, L.A. Master Chorale, the Apollo Chorus of Chicago, Robert Shaw Festival Singers, VocalEssence, the Chicago Master Singers and Dale Warland Singers. Notable works for vocalist and orchestra include commissions for Thomas Hampson, Deborah Voigt, Samuel Ramey, Elizabeth Futral, Håkan Hagegård and Evelyn Lear. Instrumental soloists range from Doc Severinsen and Leo Kottke to Robert McDuffie, William Preucil, Lynn Harrell and Cynthia Phelps.

Paulus's most popular works may be two short choral anthems, one religious, "Pilgrims' Hymn," and a non-religious but far from nakedly secular composition, "The Road Home." "Pilgrims' Hymn" was part of a one-act opera, The Three Hermits, commissioned by the House of Hope Presbyterian Church of St. Paul, MN, where it premiered in 1997. "The Road Home" was commissioned by Minnesota's Dale Warland Singers in 2001 and is based on an original tune found in the 1835 Southern Harmony Songbook. Both represent Paulus's frequent work with the poet Michael Dennis Browne, Browne and Paulus working back and forth with words and music until they had given each composition a gem-like sheen. "Pilgrims' Hymn" is a favorite of church choirs and choral groups worldwide, while "The Road Home" appears on the programs of countless high school and concert choirs everywhere. YouTube amply documents many performances of each work.

=== Opera ===
Paulus was well known for his operas, which are often described as "dramatic and lyrical" and are notable for "lush" orchestra writing. Paulus's operas include:

- The Village Singer, opera in one act (1979)
- The Postman Always Rings Twice (1982)
- The Woodlanders, a "romantic tragedy" after Thomas Hardy (1985)
- Harmoonia, an opera for children (1991)
- The Three Hermits, a "church opera" (1997)
- Summer, after a novella by Edith Wharton (1999)
- Hester Prynne at Death, after Nathaniel Hawthorne (2004)
- The Star Gatherer (2006)
- The Shoemaker (2012)
- Heloise and Abelard, with a libretto by Frank Corsaro
- The Woman at Otowi Crossing, which deals with spiritual awareness and Native Americans

=== Orchestra ===
- Lunar Maria, for orchestra (1976)
- Spectra for Small Orchestra (1980)
- Translucent Landscapes (1982)
- Concerto for Orchestra (1983)
- Seven Short Pieces for Orchestra (1984)
- Ordway Overture (1985)
- Reflections: Four Movements on a Theme of Wallace Stevens, for Chamber Orchestra (1985)
- Suite from The Woodlanders, for orchestra (1985)
- Suite from The Postman Always Rings Twice, for orchestra (1982; arr. 1986)
- Symphony (No. 1) in Three Movements Soliloquy (1986)
- Ground Breaker (Overture For Construction Instruments and Orchestra) (1987)
- Concertante for orchestra (1989)
- Symphony (No. 2) for Strings (1989)
- Night Speech for Baritone and Orchestra (1989)
- Street Music (1990)
- Sinfonietta (No. 1) (1991)
- Suite from Harmoonia, for Narrator and Full Orchestra (1991)
- Manhattan Sinfonietta (Sinfonietta No. 2) (1995)
- Concerto in the American Style, for orchestra (1998)
- The Age of American Passions, for symphony orchestra (1999)
- Dialogues for orchestra (2001)
- The Five Senses, for Narrator and Orchestra (2003)
- Paean for orchestra (2004)
- Sea Portraits, Four Pieces for orchestra (Sunrise - Sailing - Storm - Moonlight on the Sea) (2004)
- Behold This Man, George Washington, for Narrator and Orchestra (2005)
- Erotic Spirits, for Soprano and Orchestra (or Piano) (2004–06)
- Impressions for orchestra (2008)
- Introduction to Sweep Dreams, for orchestra (2008)
- Dylan Thomas Songs (Three Songs on texts by Dylan Thomas), for Soprano and Orchestra (2009)
- Prayers and Remembrances, for Mixed Chorus and Orchestra (2011)
- TimePiece, for Jazz Soloists and Orchestra (2011)
- Voices from the Gallery

=== Concertos ===
==== Piano ====
- Concerto (No. 1) for Piano and Symphony Orchestra (2002)
- Concerto (No. 2) for Piano and Concert Band (2005)

==== Violin ====
- Concerto No. 1 for Violin and Symphony Orchestra (1987)
- Concerto No. 2 for Violin and Chamber Orchestra (1992)
- Concerto No. 3 for Violin and Symphony Orchestra (2012), dedicated to William Preucil

==== Organ ====
- Concerto (No. 1) for Organ, String Orchestra, Timpani and Percussion (1992)
- Concerto (No. 2) for Organ, Chorus and Orchestra (2002)
- Grand Concerto (Concerto No. 3) for Organ and Orchestra (premiered in 2004)
- Concerto No. 4 for Organ and Symphony Orchestra (2003)

==== Other instruments ====
- Divertimento for Harp and Chamber Orchestra (1983)
- Ice Fields (Concerto) for Guitar and Orchestra (1990)
- Concerto for Trumpet (in B-flat) and Orchestra (1991), commissioned and premiered by Doc Severinsen
- Double Concerto for Violin, Cello and Orchestra (premiered in 1993)
- Concerto for String Quartet and Orchestra Three Places of Enlightenment (1995)
- Concerto for Two Trumpets and Orchestra (2003) - also arranged for Two Trumpets and Concert Band (2007)
- Bravo Bells (2003), for carillon
- Concerto for Cello and Orchestra (2009), written for Lynn Harrell
- Double Concerto for Piano and Organ with Strings and Percussion (listed as "in preparation" in 2010; possibly unfinished at the composer's death in 2014)

=== Organ ===
==== Solo ====
- A Refined Reflection
- Blithely Breezing Along, from Baronian Suite
- King David's Dance
- Meditations On The Spirit
- Organic Romp
- Three Temperaments
- Toccata
- Triptych

==== Duet ====
- Paean
- The Triumph of the Saint
- Cathedral Fanfare
