= Howard Klein (music critic) =

American music critic and pianist (1931–2021)

Howard Kenneth Klein (June 15, 1931 – March 1, 2021) was an American music critic and pianist who was the Director of Arts at the Rockefeller Foundation.

== Biography ==
Howard Kenneth Klein was born in Teaneck, New Jersey on June 15, 1931. He earned both a Bachelor of Science and Master of Science in Music from the Juilliard School. He began his career as a music teacher and pianist for dancer José Limón. In 1962 he became a music critic and reporter for The New York Times. He left The Times in 1967 to become the Assistant Director of the Rockefeller Foundation, although he continued to contribute articles to the newspaper periodically on a freelance basis into the early 1970s. Klein played an instrumental role in the Rockefeller donation that established the TV Lab at Thirteen/WNET in 1971. In 1973 he succeeded Norman Lloyd as Director of Arts of the Rockefeller Foundation. In 1983 he became Deputy Director for Arts and Humanities for the foundation, a position he remained in until he left the organization in 1986. He then worked as the Director of Artists and Repertory for New World Records. Composer Charles Wuorinen dedicated his piano composition Album Leaf (1984) to him. He had three sons and a daughter with his wife of 54 years, the realist painter Patricia Windrow (1921-2013). His sons include the tenor Adam Klein and bluegrass musician Moondi Klein.

Klein died in Winchester, Virginia on March 1, 2021, at the age of 89.
