= John Crosby (conductor) =

American conductor

- Born: John O'Hea Crosby; July 12, 1926; Bronxville, New York, U.S.
- Died: December 15, 2002 (aged 76); Rancho Mirage, California, U.S.
- Education: Yale University; Columbia University
- Occupations: Conductor; Musician; Arts Administrator; Opera director
- Known for: Founding director of Santa Fe Opera

John O’Hea Crosby (born July 12, 1926 – died December 15, 2022) was an American musician, conductor and arts administrator. He was the founding general director of The Santa Fe Opera, a company he oversaw for 43 years.

== Early life ==
A bout of asthma interrupted Crosby’s early studies in Connecticut; this caused him to attend the Los Alamos Ranch School in New Mexico for a year. It was Crosby’s first introduction to the West and, specifically, to the Santa Fe area. After graduating from The Hotchkiss School, Crosby served in the US Army for two years between 1944 and 1946, with time spent in Europe and some with the 18th Regimental Band handling piano, violin, trombone and double bass.

Attending Yale as an undergraduate soon followed; with it came consideration of several future professions, including law and becoming an airline pilot. But at Yale he studied composition with Paul Hindemith and created musical arrangements for musical productions. He graduated with a degree in music in 1950.

== Career ==
Having decided that music was to be his life, Crosby spent a few months as an assistant arranger for Broadway musicals before returning to graduate studies at Columbia University between 1951 and 1955. During these years, he became an opera lover, attending the Met regularly and working as the piano accompanist assistant to Dr. Leopold Sachse, the former artistic director of the Hamburg State Opera, and teacher of opera classes at Columbia.

In 1951, during a period of regular attendance at the Met as a standee, Crosby saw the Alfred Lunt production of Cosi fan tutte, which influenced him greatly in developing a concept for the future Santa Fe Opera.

== Founding of The Santa Fe Opera prior to 1957 ==
During the three years preceding Santa Fe’s first season in 1957, Crosby meticulously planned for its creation, helped and encouraged by Dr. Sachse. Asked in a 1991 interview why he founded the company, Crosby responded: "Because of Rudolf Bing" and he went on to explain that Bing's influential productions at the Met in the 1950s had caused him to regard opera "as a serious art form".

By this time, Crosby's parents had bought a second home on land located about three miles (5 km) north of Santa Fe. Close to this location, the San Juan Ranch, a 199-acre (0.81 km^{2}) guest ranch, became available and, sponsored by his father with a loan of $200,000 to the fledgling company (of which $115,000 would build the theatre and the balance would buy land) the purchase was completed.

From this location Crosby and Sachse (who was to be artistic director) carefully selected the specific site of the open-air theatre, which was planned to seat 480 and to be "the only outdoor theatre in America exclusively designed for opera". In addition, Crosby calculated that about $60,000 was needed to be raised to support the first summer’s operations; in the end, only $50,000 was raised but $40,000 was taken at the box office with about 12,850 people attending.

Several things characterized Crosby’s approach to the presentation of opera in Santa Fe: all operas were to be sung in English to make them as accessible as possible; staging, costuming and lighting were emphasized, as was acting. The 13 singers who were engaged were mostly young (all between 21 and their early thirties); and the innovation which was most revolutionary in the world of opera in America in the 1950s was the creation of the apprentice system, whereby the company hired a group of young singers to serve as chorus members, understudies for the main roles, and singers in secondary roles. As Crosby noted:

In this country young artists have to do something which is impossible – gain experience. But with our plan, these young people will be scheduled in small roles and will have the opportunity of working with their older brothers and sisters who have already won their spurs. To get such experience now, a young artist has to go to Europe.

The current Apprentice Program for Singers and Technicians (Technicians were added in 1965) continues at The Santa Fe Opera today. Annually (as with the 2013 season), 1,000 singer applicants competed for 43 positions and, of the 900 technician applications, 90 were chosen as apprentices. Some apprentices are invited to return for a second season.

=== The first season, 1957 ===
The program for the first season was characteristic of most of the seasons which Crosby subsequently programmed. It was an adventurous one consisting of five operas in rotating repertory. There were two fairly popular ones, Madama Butterfly (presented on 3 July 1957, opening night) and Il barbiere di Siviglia; a world premiere, on this occasion Marvin David Levy’s The Tower (coupled with Pergolesi’s La Serva Padrona); a Richard Strauss opera, Ariadne auf Naxos (many more – including many American premieres – were to follow in later seasons due to Crosby's love of that composer's work); and, finally, a major coup for Crosby and the company, Igor Stravinsky’s The Rake's Progress with the composer present for two weeks in July. Photographs exist of the composer attending rehearsals.

The first six performances were sold out and, in spite of some rainouts during what turned out to be one of Santa Fe’s wettest summers, the season was an unquestionable success, creating both national and international attention.

== Achievements 1957 to 2000 ==
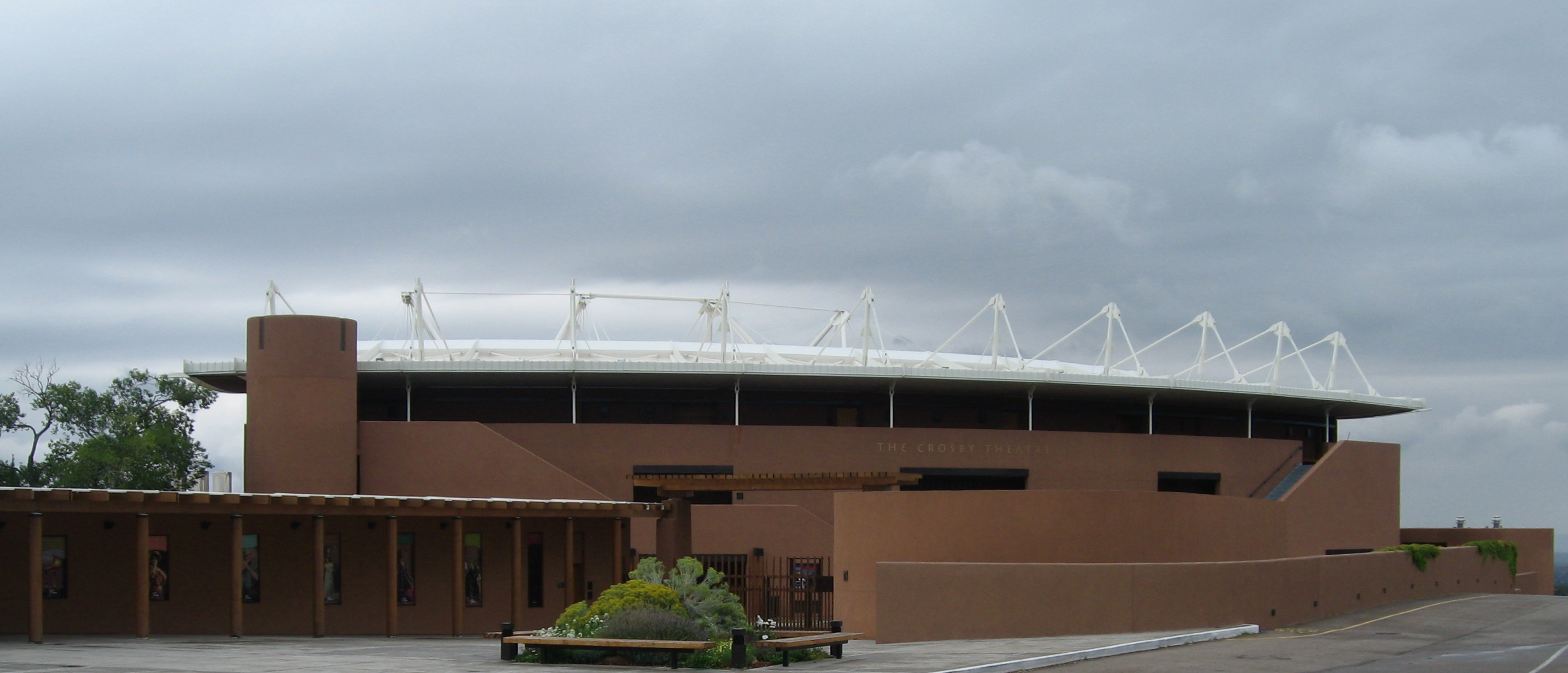
The Crosby Theatre, Santa Fe Opera's third theatre on the site, which opened in 1998

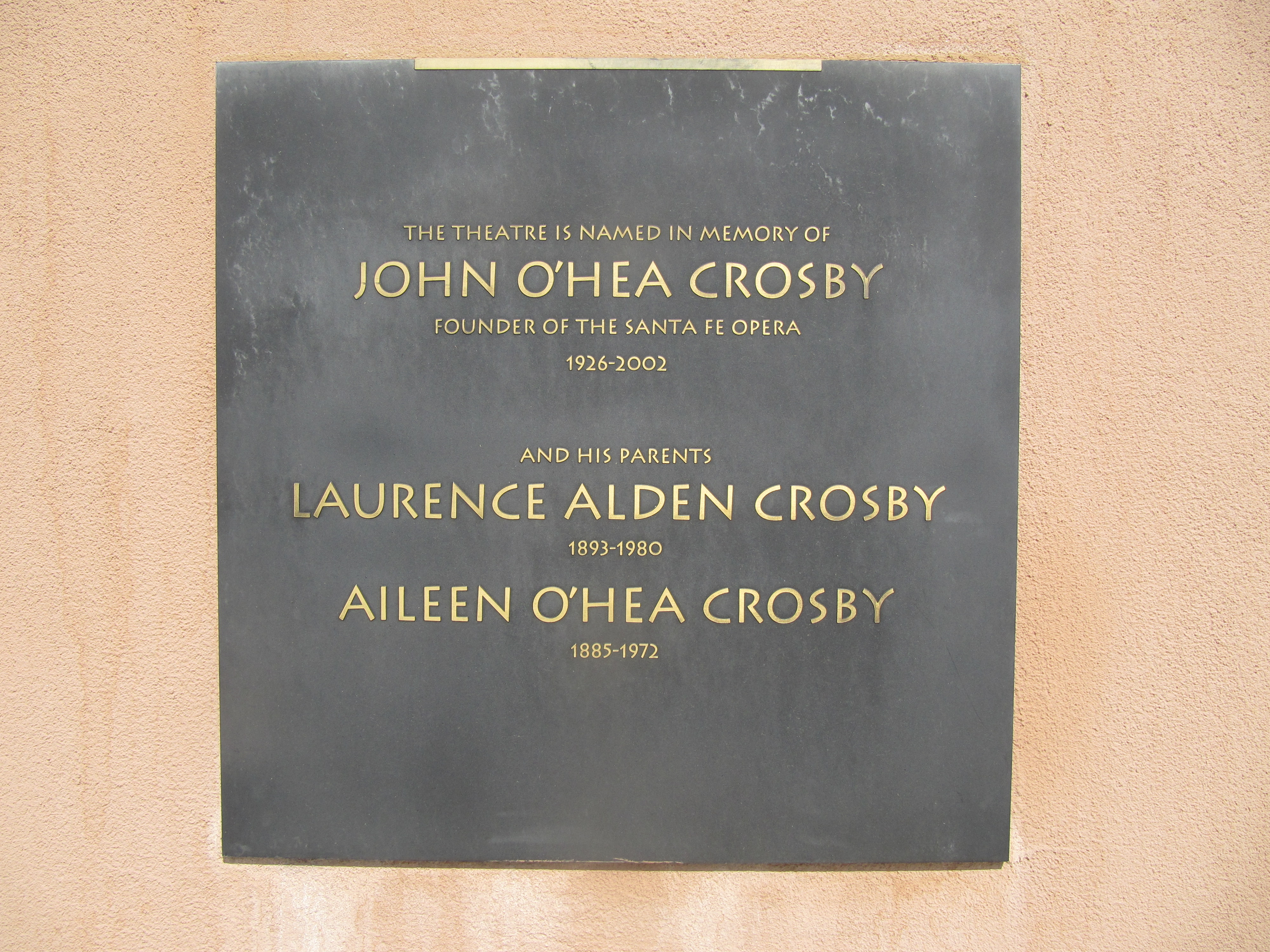
Plaque outside The Crosby Theatre commemorates the contributions of the founding general director, John Crosby, and his parents Laurence and Aileen

Crosby’s tenure as general director was the longest of any opera company director in the US. In addition, between 1957 and 2005, the company staged 135 operas, 11 of which were world premieres and 41 were American premieres. Among the commissioned works which Crosby presented as world premieres are Carlisle Floyd’s Wuthering Heights during the second season in 1958 and Tobias Picker’s Emmeline in 1996, while distinguished American premieres include six operas by Richard Strauss (beginning with Capriccio, also a part of the second season in 1958) and six operas by Hans Werner Henze between 1965 and 2000.

Igor Stravinsky was to return to Santa Fe each summer until 1963 during which time he was given “an unmatched musical pulpit” with performances of six operas ranging from Oedipus Rex (1960) to Le Rossignol (1962 and 1963).

Under Crosby’s tenure, several distinguished singers made significant appearances at The Santa Fe Opera. In the case of two singers, Kiri Te Kanawa (in 1971 as the "Countess", prior to beginning her international career later that year in England) and Bryn Terfel (in 1991), these were US debuts. Some singers, such as Samuel Ramey, who was a former apprentice, returned in Carmen in 1975; other American singers such as Jerry Hadley, Dawn Upshaw, Patricia Racette and Susan Graham and James Morris (another apprentice), appeared early in their careers and several return regularly.

Crosby’s final appearance on the podium, while also serving as General Director, was on 24 August 2000, conducting the last night of Strauss’ Elektra. It was his 171st time conducting a Strauss opera and approximately his 567th time as conductor of the opera company. Upon retirement, Crosby was succeeded by Richard Gaddes, who had been involved with the company since the late 1960s, initially as artistic administrator.

== Retirement and awards ==
Crosby retired to Palm Springs but continued to be involved with the opera company, conducting La traviata during the 2002 season.

Over his career, Crosby’s involvement in the world of opera included the presidency of the Manhattan School of Music for a decade from 1976, and a four-year presidency of the opera organization, Opera America from 1976.

In addition to five honorary doctorates, Crosby received the National Medal of Arts in 1991 and, in 1992, the German Order of Merit for services to German music.

Crosby died in Rancho Mirage, California on December 15, 2002.
