= Richard Gaddes =

Arts administrator (1942–2023)

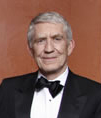
- Gaddes in 2008

General Director of the Santa Fe Opera
- In office 2000 - 30 September 2008
- Preceded by: John Crosby
- Succeeded by: Charles MacKay

President of the Grand Center of St. Louis
- In office 1987-1994

Co-founder and First General Director of the Opera Theatre of Saint Louis
- In office 1976-1985
- Succeeded by: Charles MacKay

Personal details
- Born: 23 May 1942 Wallsend, England
- Died: 12 December 2023 (aged 81) New York City, U.S.
- Education: Trinity College of Music
- Occupation: Opera company administrator

Richard Gaddes (23 May 1942 – 12 December 2023) was a British opera company administrator based in the United States.

== Early life and career in Britain ==
Gaddes was born in Wallsend, England on 23 May 1942, one of the three sons of Emily Gaddes (née Rickard) and Thomas Gaddes. He studied at Trinity College of Music in London. At Wigmore Hall, he created a series of lunchtime concerts designed to give young musicians opportunities to perform. This introduced such artists as James Galway and Margaret Price.

Gaddes formed his own artists management company, then joined Artists International Management. During a visit by John Crosby to hear new singers for the Santa Fe Opera, Gaddes helped him with the audition process. By December 1968, Crosby suggested the possibility of a job in Santa Fe. From the 1969 season, Gaddes became its artistic administrator.

== Initial career at Santa Fe Opera ==
With his knowledge of the British operatic and musical scene, Gaddes was instrumental in spotting the talent of Kiri Te Kanawa and bringing her to the Santa Fe Opera as the Countess in The Marriage of Figaro for her US debut during the 1971 summer season. During this period as Artistic Administrator, he introduced other artists such as Edo de Waart and Frederica von Stade. In addition, he was instrumental in arranging for the world premiere of Heitor Villa-Lobos' Yerma.

== Opera Theatre of Saint Louis ==
Although Gaddes remained involved with the Santa Fe Opera, he left in 1976 to establish, as co-founder, Opera Theatre of Saint Louis (OTSL) and served as its general director until 1987. Under his leadership, the company achieved international recognition for the development of young artists, the discovery of new singers given the opportunity to perform important roles, and the presentation of a varied repertory. For example, in 1983, OTSL became the first American opera company to be presented at the Edinburgh International Festival.

In a 2001 interview, Gaddes commented on his talent-spotting and encouragement of young singers:

I've been very active in the careers of Frank Lopardo who is singing "Edgardo" in Lucia di Lammermoor. I gave him his professional debut in 1984 at St Louis. I was also the one who found Alexandra von der Weth, (now singing "Lucia" here). I've been instrumental in the careers of Jerry Hadley, Thomas Hampson, Susanne Mentzer and Kevin Langan. A lot of young singers either got their experience here in Santa Fe or at Opera Theatre of Saint Louis, which was a great place for giving young singers who had graduated from universities or apprentice programs a chance to perform on stage in their own right.

After leaving OTSL, Gaddes became president of Grand Center of St. Louis and served as its president until 1994. He continued to serve on its board.

== Career resumption at Santa Fe Opera ==
Continuing as a consultant to the Santa Fe Opera's Apprentice Program for Artists from 1988 until 1994, Gaddes rejoined the company full-time in that year as Vice Chairman of the Capital Campaign for the planned new theater, the third on the original site. He was appointed associate general director of the company in 1995 and, in May 1998, was named the next general director after John Crosby. He held that post from 2000 until the end of the 2008 season.

As general director in Santa Fe, Gaddes sought to bring to Santa Fe the most important singers, conductors, directors and designers from the US and abroad. He continued and broadened the Company’s long-standing commitment to the performance of new and unusual works. In 2003, he appointed Alan Gilbert as the company’s first music director. In July 2007, SFO and Gaddes named Edo de Waart the company's new chief conductor, effective 1 October 2007.

Under Gaddes, SFO expanded its community outreach programs. These included a fall community production and, in a first for the company, the multi-screen video simulcast of Natalie Dessay’s performance in La sonnambula given in 2004 at the Fort Marcy Park. The video simulcast was repeated on 11 August 2007 with a performance of La bohème.

In August 2007, Gaddes announced his intention to retire. Gaddes' tenure as SFO general director concluded with his retirement on 30 September 2008.

== Additional work ==
Gaddes was a vice president of Opera America. He served on panels of the National Endowment for the Arts, the National Institute for Music Theatre (formerly the National Opera Institute), and as consultant for the William Matheus Sullivan Musical Foundation. He was an emeritus trustee of the board of the Pulitzer Arts Foundation and was a frequent judge at national and international voice competitions including the Metropolitan Opera National Council auditions.

== Death ==
Gaddes died in New York City on 12 December 2023, at the age of 81.

== Honours and awards ==
The recipient of numerous honors and awards, Gaddes was cited by Mu Phi Epsilon music fraternity, St. Louis Chapter of the Public Relations Society of America Lamplighter Award, and as the first annual Missouri Arts Award honoree, the Human Relations Award of the St. Louis Jewish-American Committee, National Institute for Music Theatre Award and Young Audiences' Cultural Achievement Award. He has received honorary doctorates from St. Louis Conservatory and Schools for the Arts, University of Missouri and Webster University. He was honored by the mayor of Santa Fe for his contribution to the arts, and by New Mexico Business Weekly as one of the 2005 "Top 10 Power People in the Arts". Gaddes was a frequent juror for international voice competitions.

Gaddes was recognized for his services to the arts in New Mexico by proclamation by the governor of New Mexico making 16 September 2008 as "Richard Gaddes Day". In November 2008, Gaddes was one of four recipients of the first National Endowment for the Arts's "Opera Honors Award".

Gaddes received an Honorary Doctorate from Manhattan School of Music in May 2017.

Cultural offices
| Preceded by no predecessor | General Director, Opera Theatre of Saint Louis; 1976–1985 | Succeeded by Charles MacKay |
| Preceded by John Crosby | General Director, Santa Fe Opera; 2000–2008 | Succeeded by Charles MacKay |
