= Opera Theatre of Saint Louis =

Opera festival in St. Louis, Missouri, US

- Formation: 1976
- Founders: Leigh Gerdine, Laurance L. Browning Jr. and James Van Sant
- Type: Opera company
- Location(s): Loretto-Hilton Center for the Performing Arts Webster Groves, Missouri
- Artistic director: Patricia Racette
- Website: opera-stl.org

Opera Theatre of Saint Louis (OTSL) is an American summer opera festival held in St. Louis, Missouri. Typically four operas, all sung in English, are presented each season, which runs from late May to late June. Performances are accompanied by the St. Louis Symphony Orchestra, which is divided into two ensembles, each covering two of the operas, for the season. The company's performances are presented in the Loretto-Hilton Center for the Performing Arts on the campus of Webster University.

== First seasons and achievements ==
In 1976, Leigh Gerdine, Laurance L. Browning Jr. and James Van Sant co-founded OTSL. They hired Richard Gaddes, who at the time was working at The Santa Fe Opera, as the company's first artistic director. They signed him as full-time general director in 1978 at the suggestion of Ed Korn, who was brought in as a consultant from the Metropolitan Opera. Gaddes acknowledged that the model for OTSL was The Santa Fe Opera:

That was not a coincidence. I always say that John Crosby sired the Opera Theater of St. Louis. The whole concept was modeled on Santa Fe, and part of the idea was that the apprentices here would feed into St. Louis. Which they did.

The first season in 1976 presented eleven performances of Britten's Albert Herring, Mozart's The Impresario, Menotti's The Medium, and Donizetti's Don Pasquale. This mixture of some standard works, and some new and unconventional operas, was to continue in future seasons and characterize the company's approach. This was achieved on a budget of $135,000. The young singers included Sheri Greenawald and Vinson Cole.

During the early seasons, the company had a major influence with such achievements as first joint BBC/WNET telecast of Albert Herring and in 1983 the first appearance by any U.S. opera company at the Edinburgh International Festival. The first production of a Japanese opera in Japan by any American company was followed by a return to Tokyo in September 2001 to present the Japanese premiere of the classic Genji Monogatari, adapted as an opera by Minoru Miki as The Tale of Genji.

Well-known directors Graham Vick, Jonathan Miller, and Mark Lamos have made U.S. operatic debuts with OTSL, as did conductors Leonard Slatkin and Christopher Hogwood. Colin Graham served as OTSL's director of productions from 1978 until 1985. John Nelson was OTSL's music director from 1985 to 1988, and principal conductor from 1988 to 1991.

Other notable U.S. singers, including Christine Brewer, Susan Graham, Denyce Graves, Dwayne Croft, Thomas Hampson, Jerry Hadley, Patricia Racette, Sylvia McNair, and Stephanie Blythe have made appearances in St. Louis productions. As of their 2025 Festival Season, OTSL has presented 45 world premieres, including:

- Stephen Paulus: The Postman Always Rings Twice (1982)
- Cary John Franklin: The Loss of Eden (2002)
- David Carlson: Anna Karenina (2007; libretto by Colin Graham)
- Terence Blanchard: Champion (2013; libretto by Michael Cristofer)
- Ricky Ian Gordon: Twenty-Seven (2014; libretto by Royce Vavrek)
- Jack Perla: Shalimar the Clown (2016; libretto by Rajiv Joseph after Salman Rushdie's 2005 novel of the same name)
- Huang Ruo: An American Soldier (2018; libretto by David Henry Hwang)
- Terence Blanchard: Fire Shut Up in My Bones (2019; libretto by Kasi Lemmons)
- Tobias Picker: Awakenings (2022; libretto by Aryeh Lev Stollman)

Champion, Twenty-Seven, and Shalimar the Clown were part of an OTSL series of commissioning new operas, under the "New Works, Bold Voices" initiative. In addition, OTSL has given at least 14 American premieres, including Michael Berkeley's Jane Eyre; Benjamin Britten's Paul Bunyan; Rossini's Il viaggio a Reims (The Journey to Reims); and Judith Weir's The Vanishing Bridegroom (under the title Highland Wedding).

The company trains young artists in the Gerdine Young Artists program, named for Opera Theatre's founding board chairman, Leigh Gerdine. The Gerdine Young Artists serve as the annual chorus for the company, as the company does not retain a resident chorus. OTSL chorus directors have included Donald Palumbo, Cary John Franklin, Sandra Horst, and Robert Ainsley. In February 2020, OTSL announced the appointment of Walter Huff as its next chorus director. Due to the COVID-19 pandemic however, Huff never formally took up the post.

== Administration ==
Succeeding Gaddes as OTSL general director was Charles MacKay, who held the post from 1985 to 2008. MacKay had previously served as OTSL executive director, beginning in 1984. MacKay led the campaign to construct and fund the new Sally S. Levy Opera Center, a new and permanent administrative home and year-round rehearsal facility for the organisation. In addition, in 2005, OTSL adopted projected English-language supertitles in the theatre. From 1985 until his death in April 2007, the OTSL artistic director was Colin Graham. From 1991 to 2017, OTSL's music director was Stephen Lord. Lord subsequently held the title of OTSL music director emeritus until his resignation in June 2019, following publication of allegations of sexual misconduct. In June 2017, OTSL announced the appointment of Roberto Kalb as its resident conductor, effective with the 2018 season.

In September 2007, OTSL named James Robinson as the company's next artistic director, and Timothy O'Leary to the position of executive director. MacKay concluded his OTSL tenure as general director on September 30, 2008. In June 2008, OTSL named O'Leary as its third general director, effective October 1, 2008. O'Leary concluded his OTSL general directorship on June 30, 2018.

In April 2018, OTSL announced the appointment of Andrew Jorgensen as its next general director, effective July 2, 2018. In July 2020, OTSL's then-director of artistic administration, Damon Bristo, was arrested for child sex trafficking in the second degree. He was placed on unpaid leave and later resigned.

In February 2022, OTSL announced simultaneously the extension of Robinson's contact as artistic director through 2026, and the appointment of Daniela Candillari as its new principal conductor, with an initial contract of three years. Candillari is the first female conductor to be named principal conductor of the company. In October 2022, OTSL announced an extension to Jorgensen's contract as OTSL general director through June 2028. In February 2024, OTSL announced an extension to Candillari's contract as OTSL general director through June 2028. In August 2024, OTSL announced the scheduled departure of Robinson as its artistic director, effective September 2024. In May 2025, OTSL announced the appointment of Patricia Racette as its next artistic director, the first woman to be named to the post, effective 1 October 2025. Racette is to continue as the company's director of its Young Artist Programs in parallel with this appointment.

== General directors ==
- Richard Gaddes (1976–1985)
- Charles MacKay (1985–2008)
- Timothy O'Leary (2008–2018)
- Andrew Jorgensen (2018–present)

== Music directors ==
- John Nelson (1985–1988; principal conductor, 1988–1991)
- Stephen Lord (1991–2017)
- Daniela Candillari (2022–present, principal conductor)

== Artistic directors ==
- Colin Graham (1985–2007)
- James Robinson (2008–2024)
- Patricia Racette (2025–present)

== See also ==
- List of opera festivals
