= Joyce DiDonato =

American mezzo-soprano (born 1969)

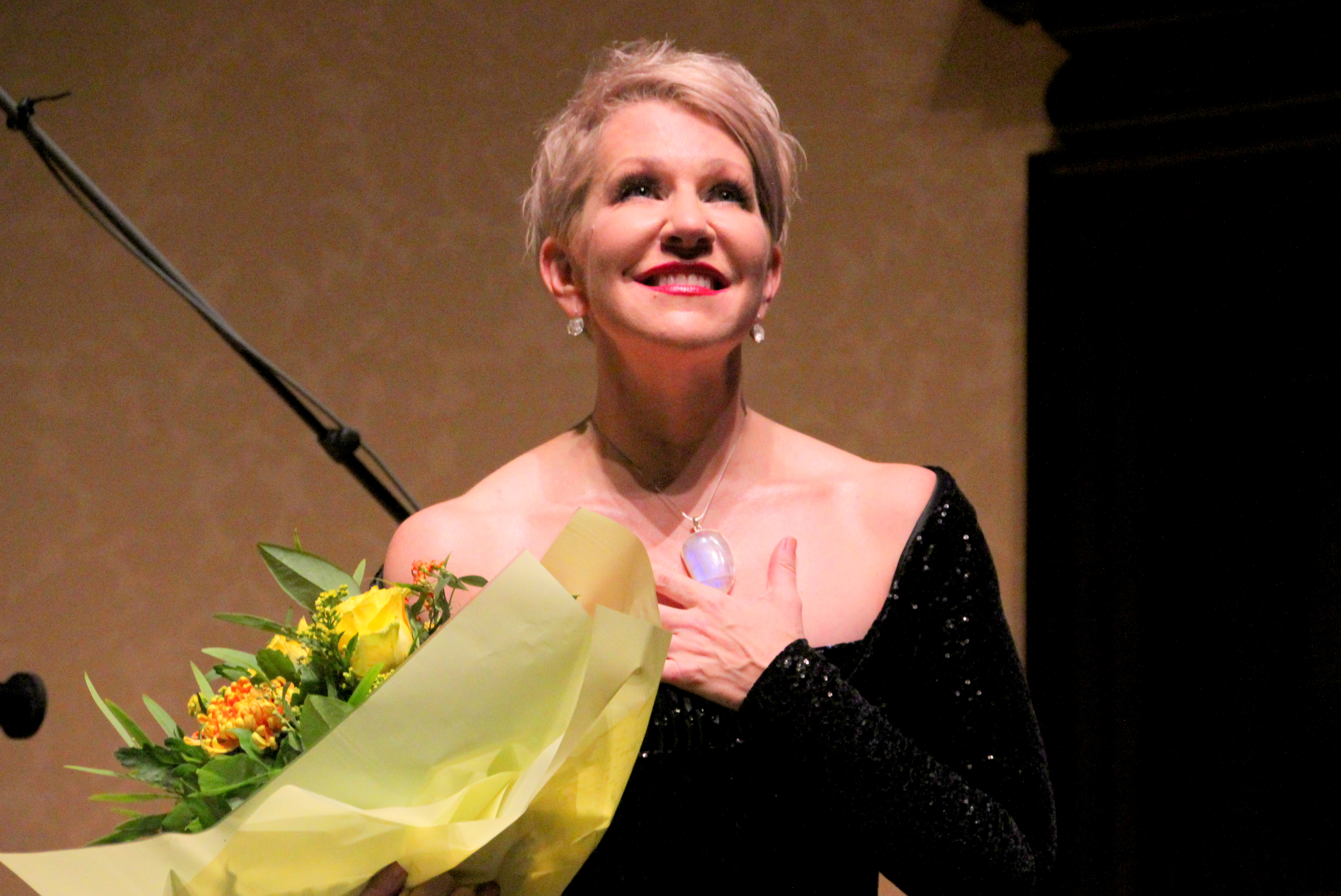
- DiDonato after a concert at Wigmore Hall in December 2017
- Born: Joyce Flaherty; February 13, 1969 (age 57); Prairie Village, Kansas, United States
- Education: Wichita State University; Academy of Vocal Arts
- Occupations: Opera singer, recitalist (mezzo-soprano)
- Years active: 1995–present
- Spouses: Alex DiDonato (m. 1990; div. 2004) Leonardo Vordoni (m. 2006; div. 2013)
- Website: joycedidonato.com

Joyce DiDonato (née Flaherty; born February 13, 1969) is an American opera singer and recitalist. A coloratura mezzo-soprano, she has performed operas and concert works spanning from the 19th-century Romantic era to those by Handel and Mozart.

Educated at Wichita State University and the Academy of Vocal Arts, DiDonato began her career in mid-1990s, participating in young artist programs of several opera companies, most notably Houston Grand Opera. Since then, she began having engagements across the United States and Europe. She made debuts at La Scala in Rossini's La Cenerentola in the 2000/01 season, the Royal Opera in Janáček's The Cunning Little Vixen in 2003, and the Metropolitan Opera as Cherubino in Mozart's The Marriage of Figaro in the 2005/06 season. She has performed in world premieres of several operas, such as Michael Daugherty's Jackie O (1997), Mark Adamo's Little Women (1999/2000), Jake Heggie's Great Scott (2015), and Kevin Puts's The Hours (2022).

DiDonato has won multiple awards including the 2012, 2016 and 2020 Grammy Award for Best Classical Vocal Solo.

== Early life ==
Joyce Flaherty was born in Prairie Village, Kansas in 1969, the sixth of seven children in an Irish-American family. Her father, Donald Martin Flaherty, was a self-employed architect who designed houses in the area; her mother, Kathleen Claire (McGlinchy) Flaherty, worked for the Gas Service Co. writing recipes in their test kitchen. One of her sisters, Amy Hetherington, was a music teacher at St. Ann Catholic School, which Joyce and her siblings attended. She later went to Bishop Miege High School where she sang in musicals.

== Education ==
Joyce entered Wichita State University (WSU) in 1988 to study vocal music education, because she was initially more interested in teaching high school vocal music and musical theatre. She became interested in opera after seeing a PBS telecast of Don Giovanni, and then, in her junior year, when she was cast in a school production of Die Fledermaus. After graduating from WSU in spring 1992, DiDonato decided to pursue graduate studies in vocal performance at the Academy of Vocal Arts (AVA). There she studied voice with Dodi Protero. In the Spring of 1996 she portrayed Olga in the AVA's production of Eugene Onegin which was led by music director Ghenady Meirson.

Following her studies in Philadelphia, DiDonato was accepted in the Santa Fe Opera's Apprentice Singer program for the summer 1995 festival season, where she appeared in several minor roles and understudied for larger parts in such operas as Mozart's The Marriage of Figaro, Richard Strauss' Salome, Kálmán's Gräfin Mariza and the 1994 world premiere of David Lang's Modern Painters. She was honored as one of several Outstanding Apprentice Artists by the Santa Fe Opera that year.

She became a part of Houston Grand Opera's young artist program in 1996; she sang there from autumn 1996 until spring 1998. During the summer of 1997, DiDonato participated in San Francisco Opera's Merola Opera Program.

During her apprentice years, DiDonato competed in several vocal competitions. In 1996 she won second prize in the Eleanor McCollum Competition and was a district winner of the Metropolitan Opera National Council Auditions. In 1997 she won a William Matheus Sullivan Award, while in 1998 she won second prize in the Operalia Competition, first place in the Stewart Awards, won the George London Competition, and received a Richard F. Gold Career Grant from the Shoshana Foundation.

In a 2016 interview with English mezzo-soprano Janet Baker, DiDonato discussed that from age 26 to 29 (circa 1995–1998), she radically changed her vocal technique. "When a lot of my friends were getting covers at The Met and leading roles at [The New York] City Opera,… it wasn't coming together for me. And I stopped and I said, 'OK, let's revamp.' .... And I was really bad for about a year and a half, because my teacher was taking away all the mechanism that I was using to sing. And it was the best thing that could have happened."

== Career ==
=== 1998–2008 ===
DiDonato began her professional career in the 1998/1999 season singing with several regional opera companies in the United States. She most notably appeared as the main heroine, Maslova, in the world premiere of Tod Machover's Resurrection with Houston Grand Opera. She gave a recital in San Francisco that year as part of the Schwabacher recital series.

Also at Houston Grand Opera, she performed the role of Meg in the world premiere during the 1999/2000 season of Mark Adamo's Little Women with Stephanie Novacek as Jo and Chad Shelton as Laurie. That season, she also sang the role of Cherubino in The Marriage of Figaro with the Santa Fe Opera and the role of Isabella in L'italiana in Algeri with the New Israeli Opera. She gave a recital at New York's Morgan Library under the auspices of the George London Foundation and featured as a soloist in the Seattle Symphony production of Handel's Messiah.

DiDonato made her debut at La Scala as Angelina in Rossini's La Cenerentola in the 2000/01 season, returned to Houston Grand Opera as Dorabella in Così fan tutte, and sang the mezzo-soprano solos in Bach Mass in B minor with the Ensemble Orchestral de Paris and conductor John Nelson.

The 2001/2002 season included debuts with Washington National Opera as Dorabella in Così fan tutte, with De Nederlandse Opera as Sesto in Handel's Giulio Cesare, with Opéra National de Paris as Rosina in The Barber of Seville, and with Bavarian State Opera as Cherubino in under the baton of Zubin Mehta. Also, she returned to the Santa Fe Opera to perform the role of Annio in La clemenza di Tito and made several concert appearances, including those with Riccardo Muti conducting the Orchestra of La Scala in Vivaldi's Gloria and the Ensemble Orchestral de Paris's presentation of Mendelssohn's A Midsummer Night's Dream.

The 2002/03 season saw debuts with the New York City Opera as Sister Helen in Jake Heggie's Dead Man Walking, at the Théâtre du Châtelet in the title role of La Cenerentola, at the Royal Opera House as Zlatohřbítek the fox in Janáček's The Cunning Little Vixen under Sir John Eliot Gardiner, and with the New National Theatre Tokyo as Rosina in The Barber of Seville. It also saw performances of the title role in Rossini's Adina at the Rossini Opera Festival and Cherubino at Opéra Bastille.

In concert, she performed Mozart's Requiem with the Seattle Symphony, Berlioz's Les nuits d'été with the Ensemble Orchestral de Paris, and made her Carnegie Hall debut in a production of Bach's Mass in B Minor with the Orchestra of St. Luke's under the baton of Peter Schreier. She toured Europe with Marc Minkowski and Les Musiciens du Louvre in performances of Les nuits d'été.

In the 2003/2004 season DiDonato made her debut at San Francisco Opera as Rosina and then reprised the role at Houston Grand Opera. She performed Idamante in Mozart's Idomeneo with De Nederlandse Opera and at the Aix-en-Provence Festival, and also sang the role of Ascanio in a concert performance of Berlioz's Benvenuto Cellini with the Orchestre National de France. She made solo recital appearances at the Lincoln Center in New York, the Kennedy Center in Washington, Kansas City's Folly Theater, and Wigmore Hall in London, among others. She sang at the Hollywood Bowl in a production of Beethoven's Symphony No. 9 with the Los Angeles Philharmonic.

She gave her first performances in Donizetti's Maria Stuarda as the role of Elisabetta at the Grand Théâtre de Genève during the 2004/2005 season. Also, she returned to La Scala as Angelina in Rossini's La Cenerentola and once again played Rosina in a new production of The Barber of Seville by Luca Ronconi at the Pesaro Festival and the Teatro Comunale di Bologna.

During the 2005/06 season, she made her Metropolitan Opera debut as Cherubino in The Marriage of Figaro and also played Stéphano in Gounod's Roméo et Juliette there. She returned to the Royal Opera House as Rosina in The Barber of Seville, sang her first Sesto in Mozart's La clemenza di Tito at Grand Théâtre de Genève, and sang the role of Dejanira in Handel's Hercules at the Brooklyn Academy of Music in New York and the Barbican Centre with William Christie. She appeared in several concerts with the New York Philharmonic and gave a recital at Wigmore Hall. She closed the Santa Fe Opera's 50th anniversary season in the title role of Massenet's Cendrillon.

DiDonato debuted at the Teatro Real as the composer in Ariadne auf Naxos in the 2006/07 season, and returned to the Paris Opera as Idamante in Mozart's Idomeneo and to Houston Grand Opera as Angelina in La Cenerentola. She sang Rosina in The Barber of Seville at the Metropolitan Opera and sang her first Octavian in Der Rosenkavalier with the San Francisco Opera in addition to an extensive recital tour through the United States and Europe accompanied by Julius Drake.

Her 2007/08 season appearances included her debut at the Liceu as Angelina in La Cenerentola and at the Lyric Opera of Chicago as Rosina. She sang the title role in Handel's Alcina with Alan Curtis and Il Complesso Barocco and the title role in Handel's Ariodante at the Grand Théâtre de Genève. She also sang Roméo in Bellini's I Capuleti e i Montecchi at the Opéra Bastille and returned to Teatro Real as Idamante in Idomeneo in July 2008. She gave recitals at La Scala, Lincoln Center, and the Brooklyn Academy of Music, and performed a special concert of Handel arias which was recorded in Brussels.

=== 2009–present ===
In the 2008/2009 season, DiDonato returned to Royal Opera House as Donna Elvira in Don Giovanni. In a performance as Rosina at the same house on July 7, she slipped onstage and broke her right fibula, hopping in the first act and spending the rest on crutches. She then carried out the five remaining performances in a wheelchair. She performed the roles of Beatrice in Berlioz's Béatrice et Bénédict at Houston Grand Opera, Idamante in Mozart's Idomeneo with Opéra National de Paris, and Rosina in her debut at Vienna State Opera.

She also appeared in concerts with the New York Philharmonic, Kansas City Symphony, and the Metropolitan Opera Orchestra, the latter of which under the baton of James Levine. She toured Europe and the United States with Les Talens Lyriques, giving concerts of Handel arias, including performances at Wigmore Hall and the Rossini Opera Festival.

She sang the role of Isolier in Rossini's Le comte Ory at the Metropolitan Opera in April 2011. In April 2012, she sang the title role in Donizetti's Maria Stuarda at the Houston Grand Opera, repeating the role in the work's premiere performances at the Metropolitan Opera in January 2013. In the spring of 2013, she starred in a new production of La donna del lago at the Royal Opera House. A new production was mounted by the Santa Fe Opera during its 2013 festival season, also starring DiDonato with Lawrence Brownlee as Uberto. For the first time in its 57-year history, the Santa Fe Opera added an extra performance of La donna del lago due to unprecedented ticket demand.

On September 7, 2013 she performed at the Last Night of the Proms, singing arias by Massenet ("Je suis gris! je suis ivre!"), Handel ("Ombra mai fu"), and Rossini ("Tanti affetti in tal momento!") as well as "You'll Never Walk Alone" from the musical Carousel, "Over the Rainbow" from the Wizard of Oz as a bow to her home State of Kansas, and "Danny Boy"; she then led the audience into the traditional "Rule, Britannia!". On September 21, 2013, she sang the role of Romeo as the Lyric Opera of Kansas City opened its season with Bellini's I Capuleti e i Montecchi.

In January 2014, DiDonato was named a "Perspectives" artist for the duration of Carnegie Hall's 2014/2015 season. During that time her performance collaborators include The English Concert conducted by Harry Bicket, her accompanist David Zobel, the Brentano String Quartet, and the Philadelphia Orchestra conducted by Maurizio Benini.

She performed in Rossini's La Cenerentola, as the title role at the Metropolitan Opera in April and May.

In early September 2014, she opened the Wigmore Hall's 2014/15 season with two concerts and with Antonio Pappano at the piano. The programme included works by Haydn, Rossini, Santoliquido and songs from the Great American Songbook. A live recording was released in 2015 as Joyce and Tony: Live at Wigmore Hall, which won Best Classical Vocal Solo Album in the 2016 Grammy Award.

In late September 2014, DiDonato opened the Barbican Centre's 2014/15 classical season with a concert entitled "Stella di Napoli" with the Orchestre et Choeur de l'Opéra de Lyon conducted by Riccardo Minasi. This was the first concert of five events for Joyce DiDonato in the Barbican's Artist Spotlight series. The remaining four events were three concerts:

- Handel's Alcina with the English Concert conducted by Harry Bicket
- Camille Claudel: Into the Fire, a song cycle written for her by Jake Heggie, with the Brentano String Quartet
- a concert with the New York Philharmonic conducted by Alan Gilbert and a masterclass at the Guildhall School of Music and Drama.

In 2015, she began giving masterclasses annually at Carnegie Hall, more specifically, at the Weill Music Institute. This is a three-day program where several aspiring singers (usually college students) study with her personally over three days, to receive important feedback regarding their performance and vocal abilities.

In November 2016, she released an album entitled In War & Peace: Harmony through Music, a project conceived in response to the November 2015 Paris attacks. She collaborated with Maxim Emelyanychev and Il Pomo d'Oro in a series of concert recitals imbued with choreography and theatrical effects. They subsequently toured the program through Europe and the United States. The project, which lasted for three years, also toured to Russia, Asia, and South America; the 4 June 2017 performance at the Liceu was filmed and later released on DVD. The last performances in November 2019 staged at the Kennedy Center, Washington D.C., was followed by a conversation with Donna Leon and Justice Ruth Bader Ginsburg.

On December 31, 2017, she was featured in a New Year's Eve Concert at the Berlin Philharmonic.

In 2019, she released her album Songplay, which mixes jazz, Latin, and tango rhythms into arrangements of Italian Baroque arias, jazz standards, and picks from the Great American Songbook. After a well-acclaimed album release, she then went on to do a national tour, after the album was released between February 18 and March 10, 2019. This album received a 2020 Grammy Award – DiDonato's third.

DiDonato acted and sang in the Metropolitan Opera's production of Handel's Agrippina in 2020, in the title role of Agrippina. She portrayed Virginia Woolf in the Metropolitan Opera's world stage premiere of Kevin Puts's opera The Hours in November 2022. On her debut tour of Australia in 2025 she sang Berlioz's Les Nuits d'été with the Tasmanian Symphony Orchestra in Hobart and with the Melbourne Symphony Orchestra in Hamer Hall, and she gave a master class.

== Personal life ==
Joyce Flaherty married Alex DiDonato at 21. They divorced after being together for 14 years. She met Italian conductor Leonardo Vordoni at the Rossini Opera Festival in 2003 and fell in love at first sight. They married in August 2006 at Las Vegas' Venetian Hotel in a gondola during performances of Cendrillon at the Santa Fe Opera and shared a home in Kansas City, Kansas. Their marriage ended in 2013. DiDonato currently lives near Barcelona.

== Awards and honors ==
- 2000: ARIA (Awards Recognizing Individual Artistry) award, which was given annually to American "vocal artists of exceptional ability and undeniable promise"
- 2002: Richard Tucker Award
- 2003: New York City Opera's Richard Gold Debut Award
- 2006: Singer Award, part of the annual Royal Philharmonic Society Music Awards.
- 2007: Metropolitan Opera's Beverly Sills Award
- 2010: ECHO Klassik Award for Singer of the Year
- 2010: Gramophone Award for Recital of the Year for Rossini: Colbran, the Muse
- 2010: Gramophone Award for Artist of the Year
- 2012: Gramophone's Hall of Fame
- 2012: 54th Annual Grammy Awards, Grammy Award for Best Classical Vocal Solo for her solo recording Diva Divo
- 2013: ECHO Klassik Award for Female Singer of the Year
- 2013 Musical America Musician of the Year Award
- 2014 Honorary Doctorate from the Juilliard School
- 2014 Honorary Membership of the Royal Academy of Music
- 2014 Mu Phi Epsilon Award of Merit
- 2015 International Classical Music Awards Winner for Vocal Recital
- 2015 The magazine Limelight for "Opera Recording of the Year"
- 2015: ECHO Klassik Award for Female Singer of the Year
- 2016: 58th Annual Grammy Awards – Grammy Award for Best Classical Vocal Solo (with accompanist Antonio Pappano) for Joyce & Tony – Live from Wigmore Hall
- 2017: ECHO Klassik Award for Female Singer of the Year
- 2017: Gramophone Award for Recital of the Year: In War and Peace: Harmony through Music
- 2018: Handel Prize
- 2018: Laurence Olivier Award for outstanding achievement in opera.
- 2019: 62nd Annual Grammy Awards – Grammy Award for Best Classical Vocal Performance for Songplay

== Film and television appearances ==
- Meg March in Mark Adamo's Little Women with conductor Patrick Summers and Houston Grand Opera Orchestra, aired on PBS' Great Performances in 2001
- Rosina in Rossini's The Barber of Seville with conductor Bruno Campanella and Opéra National de Paris, aired on television in 2002, released on DVD 2002
- "Gala Jean-Philippe Rameau" – Concert du 20ème anniversaire des Musiciens du Louvre, aired on television in 2003
- Dejanira in Handel's Hercules with conductor William Christie, Les Arts Florissants, and Aix-en-Provence Festival, aired on television in 2005, released on DVD 2005
- Elvira in Mozart's Don Giovanni with conductor Charles Mackerras at the Royal Opera House, released on DVD in 2008
- Rosina in Rossini's The Barber of Seville with conductor Antonio Pappano at the Royal Opera House, released on DVD in 2010
- Angelina in Rossini's La Cenerentola with conductor Patrick Summers at the Gran Teatre del Liceu, released on DVD in 2010
- Isolier in Rossini's Le comte Ory with conductor Maurizio Benini at the Metropolitan Opera, released on DVD in 2012
- Cendrillon in Massenet's Cendrillon with conductor Bertrand de Billy at the Royal Opera House, released on DVD in 2012
- Homecoming: The Kansas City Symphony Presents Joyce DiDonato with conductor Michael Stern and The Kansas City Symphony at The Kauffman Center for the Performing Arts, broadcast July 2012 on PBS, released on DVD and digital download July 2012
- Last Night of the Proms, Royal Albert Hall, London, September 7, 2013, with Marin Alsop conducting
- Sang "The Star-Spangled Banner" before Game 7 of the 2014 World Series at Ewing M. Kauffman Stadium in Kansas City, Missouri
- Mary Stuart in Donizetti's Maria Stuarda with conductor Maurizio Benini at the Metropolitan Opera, released on Blu-ray in 2014
- Florence Foster Jenkins in Die Florence Foster Jenkins Story, written and directed by Ralf Pleger, released in Germany in 2016.
- Narrator in documentary Maria by Callas (2017)
- Sang five of Richard Strauss' orchestral songs with the Berliner Philharmoniker, Simon Rattle conducting, for "New Year's Eve Concert Silvesterkonzert 2017", released on Blu-ray in 2018
- Adalgisa in Bellini's Norma with conductor Carlo Rizzi at the Metropolitan Opera, Released on Blu-ray in 2018

== Roles in operas ==
- Adalgisa, Norma (Bellini)
- Adina, Adina (Rossini)
- Agrippina, Agrippina (Handel)
- Alcina, Alcina (Handel)
- Angelina (Cenerentola), La Cenerentola (Rossini)
- Annio, La clemenza di Tito (Mozart)
- Arden Scott, Great Scott (Jake Heggie) @
- Ariodante, Ariodante (Handel)
- Ascanio, Benvenuto Cellini (Berlioz)
- Beatrice, Béatrice et Bénédict (Berlioz)
- Cendrillon, Cendrillon (Massenet)
- Charlotte, Werther (Massenet)
- Cherubino, The Marriage of Figaro (Mozart)
- The Composer, Ariadne auf Naxos (R. Strauss)
- Dejanira, Hercules (Handel)
- Didon, Les Troyens (Berlioz)
- Donna Elvira, Don Giovanni (Mozart)
- Dorabella, Così fan tutte (Mozart)
- Elena, La donna del lago (Rossini)
- Elisabetta, Maria Stuarda (Donizetti)
- Elmira, Floridante (Handel)
- Grace Kelly, Jackie O (Michael Daugherty) @
- Idamante, Idomeneo (Mozart)
- Isabella, L'italiana in Algeri (Rossini)
- Isolier, Le comte Ory (Rossini)
- Maria, Maria Stuarda (Donizetti)
- Maslova, Resurrection (Tod Machover) @
- Meg, Little Women (Mark Adamo) @
- Octavian, Der Rosenkavalier (R. Strauss)
- Romeo, I Capuleti e i Montecchi (Bellini)
- Rosina, The Barber of Seville (Rossini)
- Semiramide, Semiramide (Rossini)
- Sesto, La clemenza di Tito (Mozart)
- Sesto Pompeo, Giulio Cesare (Handel)
- Sister Helen, Dead Man Walking (Jake Heggie)
- Sycorax, The Enchanted Island @
- Stéphano, Roméo et Juliette (Gounod)
- Virginia Woolf, The Hours (Kevin Puts) @
- Zlatohřbítek the fox, The Cunning Little Vixen (Janáček)

@ Indicates a world premiere

== Recordings ==
=== Complete operas ===
- Daugherty – Jackie O as Grace Kelly (1997); with Christopher Larkin conducting Houston Grand Opera Orchestra, Argo Records
- Tod Machover – Resurrection as Maslova (1999); with Patrick Summers conducting Houston Grand Opera Orchestra, Albany Records
- Mark Adamo – Little Women as Meg March (2001) with Patrick Summers conducting Houston Grand Opera Orchestra, Ondine
- Rossini – La Cenerentola as Angelina (Cenerentola) (2005); with Alberto Zedda conducting SWR Orchestra Kaiserslautern, Naxos Records
- Berlioz – Benvenuto Cellini as Ascanio (2005); with John Nelson conducting Orchestre National de France, Virgin Classics
- Handel – Radamisto as Radamisto (2005); with Alan Curtis leading Il Complesso Barocco, Virgin Classics
- Handel – Floridante as Elmira (2007); with Alan Curtis leading Il Complesso Barocco, Deutsche Grammophon Archiv Produktion
- Handel – Alcina as Alcina (2009); with Alan Curtis leading Il Complesso Barocco, Deutsche Grammophon Archiv Produktion
- Vivaldi – Ercole su'l Termodonte as Ippolita (2010); with Fabio Biondi leading Europa Galante, Virgin Classics
- Handel – Ariodante as Ariodante (2011); with Alan Curtis leading Il Complesso Barocco, Virgin Classics
- Mozart – Don Giovanni as Donna Elvira (2012); with Yannick Nézet-Séguin conducting Mahler Chamber Orchestra, Deutsche Grammophon
- Jake Heggie – Dead Man Walking as Sister Helen Prejean (2012); with Patrick Summers conducting Houston Grand Opera Orchestra, Virgin Classics
- Berlioz – Les Troyens as Didon (2017); with John Nelson conducting Orchestre philharmonique de Strasbourg, Erato Records/Warner Classics
- Berlioz – La Damnation de Faust as Marguerite (2019); Les Petits Chanteurs de Strasbourg, Maîtrise de l'Opéra national du Rhin, Orchestre philarmonique de Strasbourg, conducted by John Nelson, Errato Records/Warner Classics. Diapason d'or.
- Handel – Agrippina as Agrippina (2020); with Maxim Emelyanychev leading Il Pomo d'Oro, Erato Records/Warner Classics
- Handel – Theodora as Irene (2022); with Maxim Emelyanychev leading Il Pomo d'Oro, Erato
- Berlioz – Roméo et Juliette & Cléopâtre (2023) Erato; with John Nelson leading Orchestre Philharmonique de Strasbourg

=== Concerts ===
- Antonio Vivaldi: The Complete Sacred Music (2005); with Robert King conducting The King's Consort, Hyperion Records
- Mendelssohn: A Midsummer Nights Dream (2003); with John Nelson conducting the Ensemble Orchestral de Paris, EMI Classics
- Mozart: The Last Concerto 1791 (2002); with Frans Brüggen conducting the Orchestra of the Eighteenth Century, Glossa
- Rossini: Stabat Mater (2010); with Antonio Pappano conducting the Orchestra dell'Accademia Nazionale di Santa Cecilia, EMI Classics
- Homecoming: The Kansas City Symphony Presents Joyce DiDonato (2012); Michael Stern conducting Kansas City Symphony

=== Recitals ===
- Amor e gelosia: Handel Operatic Duets (2004); with Patrizia Ciofi, Alan Curtis leading Il Complesso Barocco, Virgin Classics
- The Deepest Desire, songs by Bernstein, Copland and Heggie (2006); accompanied by pianist David Zobel, Eloquentia
- Joyce DiDonato: Songs by Fauré, Hahn and Head · Arias by Rossini and Handel, (recorded live at Wigmore Hall, released 2006); accompanied by pianist Julius Drake, Wigmore Hall Live
- ¡Pasión!, songs by de Falla, Granados, Montsalvatge, Obradors and Turina (2007); accompanied by pianist Julius Drake, Eloquentia
- Furore – Mad Scenes from Handel Operas (2008); Christophe Rousset conducting Les Talens Lyriques, Virgin Classics
- Colbran, the Muse, Rossini Opera Arias for Isabella Colbran (2009); Edoardo Müller conducting Orchestra dell'Accademia Nazionale di Santa Cecilia, Virgin Classics
- Diva, Divo, arias by Bellini, Berlioz, Gluck, Gounod, Massenet, Mozart, Rossini and R. Strauss (2011); Kazushi Ono conducting Orchestre et Choeur de l'Opéra National de Lyon, Virgin Classics
- Drama Queens, arias by Cesti, Giacomelli, Händel, Hasse, Haydn, Keiser, Monteverdi, Orlandini and Porta (2012); Alan Curtis leading Il Complesso Barocco, Virgin Classics
- Rejoyce! The Best of Joyce DiDonato [compilation] (2013) Erato
- Stella di Napoli, arias by Pacini, Bellini, Donizetti, Carafe, Rossini, Valentini and Mercadante (2014); Riccardo Minasi conducting Orchestre et Choeur de l'Opéra de Lyon, Erato
- here/after, songs by Jake Heggie, Stephen Costello (2015); Joyce DiDonato, Nathan Gunn, Talise Trevigne, Carol Wincenc, Alexander String Quartet, Pentatone PTC 5186515
- Passing By – Songs by Jake Heggie, with Isabel Bayrakdarian, Zheng Cao, Susan Graham, Paul Groves, Keith Phares, Frederica von Stade, Dawn Harms (violin), CarlaMaria Rodrigues (viola), Emil Miland (cello) and Jake Heggie (piano) (2010) Avie AV-2198
- Joyce & Tony: Live at Wigmore Hall, arias by Rossini, Santoliquido, a cantata by Haydn and songs from the Great American Songbook (recorded September 2014, released 2015); accompanied by Antonio Pappano at the piano, Erato
- In War & Peace: Harmony through music, arias by Handel, Purcell, Monteverdi, Leo and Jommelli (2016); Maxim Emelyanychev conducting Il Pomo d'Oro, Erato
- Songplay (2019) Erato
- Schubert: Winterreise, with Yannick Nézet-Séguin (piano) (2021) Erato
- EDEN (2022) Erato

=== Others ===
- William Barnewitz: Long Road Home, DiDonato appears as a guest artist, released 2007, Avie
- Plácido Domingo's Operalia '98: A Tribute to Passion and Soul, released 1998, Montblanc
