= Jennifer Aylmer =

American operatic soprano

Jennifer Aylmer (born June 21, 1972) is an American soprano and voice teacher. She has had an active concert and opera career in the United States since the mid 1990s. Educated at the Eastman School of Music, the Juilliard School, and Westminster Choir College, she was a member of Houston Grand Opera's young artist program in her early career. She has sung in the world premieres of operas by composers Mark Adamo, Deborah Drattell, Kirke Mechem, Tobias Picker, and Michael Torke. She has been particularly active with the New York City Opera, and has appeared in operas with the Metropolitan Opera, Opera Boston, the Minnesota Opera, and the Opera Theatre of Saint Louis among other companies. She has also been active as an oratorio soloist and concert soprano with American orchestras and choruses such as the National Symphony Orchestra and the Oratorio Society of New York. Her performance activities have been more sporadic in recent years as her work has moved into music education. She currently teaches on the voice faculty at Carnegie Mellon University.

== Early life and education ==
Jennifer Aylmer was born on June 21, 1972. A native of Hewlett, New York, she graduated from Hewlett High School. She was a winner of the Long Island Teen Talent Competition in 1990. She studied voice at the Eastman School of Music (ESM) at the University of Rochester. While there she performed the role of Susanna in ESM's 1993 production of The Marriage of Figaro. That same year she pursued additional training at the Music Academy of the West.

After graduating from Eastman in 1994, Aylmer pursued further studies for two years at the Juilliard Opera Center. There she portrayed Hilde Mack in Juilliard's 1996 production of Hans Werner Henze's Elegy for Young Lovers. In 1995 she participated in a public master class given by Leontyne Price under the sponsorship of the Richard Tucker Music Foundation. She later earned a Masters in Vocal Pedagogy from Westminster Choir College.

== Career ==
Aylmer made her professional opera debut at the New York City Opera (NYCO) in 1996 as Barbarina in The Marriage of Figaro. That same year she performed the role of Mademoiselle Silberklang in Mozart's Der Schauspieldirektor with the National Symphony Orchestra and conductor Christopher Hogwood. In 1997 she was a soloist with the Florida Philharmonic Orchestra in Carl Orff's Carmina Burana. That same year she joined the Houston Opera Studio, the young artist training program at the Houston Grand Opera (HGO), and made her HGO debut as Gretel in Hansel and Gretel. She repeated the role of Gretel at the NYCO in 1998.

In 1998 Aylmer performed several more roles at the HGO; including Barbarina, Frasquita in Carmen, and Amy March in the world premiere of Mark Adamo's Little Women (with Joyce DiDonato and Daniel Belcher). In 1999 she performed roles in two world premieres at the NYCO: the Rich Lady in Michael Torke's Strawberry Fields and The Girl in Deborah Drattell's The Festival of Regrets. In 2000 she portrayed Elisetta in Il matrimonio segreto at Opera Saratoga, and Sophie in Der Rosenkavalier at the Minnesota Opera.

In 2002 she portrayed the Governess in The Turn of the Screw at the Berkshire Opera Company, Norina in Don Pasquale at Michigan Opera Theatre, Nannetta in Falstaff at the Kentucky Opera, and both Gilda in Rigoletto and Stella in André Previn's A Streetcar Named Desire at the Austin Lyric Opera. She returned to the NYCO as Pamina in The Magic Flute (2003), Emilia in Flavio (2003), Dorinda Orlando (2005), and Gretel (2006). In 2004 she portrayed Tytania in A Midsummer Night's Dream at the Lyric Opera of Kansas City (LOKC), and Gabrielle in La Vie parisienne with Opera Boston. She later returned to the LOKC in 2008 as Martha Barber in the world premiere of Kirke Mechem's John Brown.

Aylmer made her debut at the Metropolitan Opera ("Met") on December 2, 2005 as Bella Griffiths in the world premiere of Tobias Picker's An American Tragedy with a cast that included Nathan Gunn, Susan Graham, Patricia Racette, and conductor James Conlon. She later returned to the Met in the 2006-2007 season as Papagena in Julie Taymor's production of Die Zauberflöte, and in 2010 as Berta in The Barber of Seville with Diana Damrau as Rosina and Franco Vassallo as Figaro. Her portrayal of Papagena was filmed for Metropolitan Opera Live in HD.

In 2007 Aylmer appeared with Utah Opera as Rosasharn in The Grapes of Wrath, and reprised the roles of Gretel and Dorinda at the Atlanta Opera. In 2008 she portrayed Kathie in The Student Prince at the Nashville Opera, and the title role in Rodelinda at the Portland Opera. In 2009 she appeared with Opera Boston as Mařenka in The Bartered Bride. That same year she portrayed Susanna in The Marriage of Figaro at the Green Mountain Opera Festival, and the title role in Semele with Florentine Opera. She repeated the role of Susanna at the Portland Opera in 2011, and appeared as Monica in The Medium at the 2011 Spoleto Festival USA.

In 2012 Aylmer portrayed Despina in Così fan tutte at the Opera Theatre of Saint Louis (OTSL), and in 2013 she was the soprano soloist in Handel's Messiah with the National Chorale. She had previously been a soloist in Messiah with the Detroit Oratorio Society in 2001, the Oratorio Society of New York at Carnegie Hall in 2004, and the Kansas City Symphony in 2010. Other oratorio performances during her career included Felix Mendelssohn's Elijah with the Rochester Oratorio Society and Rochester Philharmonic Orchestra (2000), and Joseph Haydn's The Creation with the Honolulu Symphony Orchestra (2004) among others.

In 2018 she performed a program of music by Leonard Bernstein with the Philadelphia Chamber Music Society. She returned to the OTSL in 2019 as Virtue in L'incoronazione di Poppea.

She has received critical praise from major newspapers including the New York Times, hailing her "awesome accuracy," and the Chicago Sun Times, describing her as "dazzling," "regal," and "fatally attractive."
