= Chad Shelton =

American operatic tenor (born 1970)

Chad Shelton (born 1970 in Orange, Texas) is an American operatic tenor. Particularly associated with the Houston Grand Opera (HGO), Shelton has excelled in performances of contemporary American operas and in the works of Wolfgang Amadeus Mozart and Giuseppe Verdi. He has appeared in numerous world premieres with the HGO including Laurie in Mark Adamo's Little Women (1998), Nico in Adamo's Lysistrata (2005), and Ulises in Daniel Catán's Salsipuedes: a Tale of Love, War and Anchovies (2004) among others. He also sang the role of Brigadier General Edward Porter Alexander in the world premiere of Philip Glass's Appomattox at the San Francisco Opera (2007).

Shelton has appeared with numerous opera companies throughout the United States, Europe, and in Australia. His signature roles include Laurie, Ferrando in Mozart's Così fan tutte, Tamino in Mozart's Die Zauberflöte, Don Jose in Georges Bizet's Carmen, Alfredo in Verdi's La traviata, and more recently the Duke of Mantua in Verdi's Rigoletto. He has made a number of recordings with the Minnesota Orchestra and performed with numerous orchestras throughout the United States.

== Education and early career ==
Shelton studied voice with Robert Grayson at Louisiana State University and then at Yale University on the graduate level. He made his professional opera debut in 1994 while still at LSU as Tamino in Wolfgang Amadeus Mozart's Die Zauberflöte with Baton Rouge Opera. That same year he played the roles of Frederic in The Pirates of Penzance, the Second Composer in The Great Waltz and the Second Waiter in Giuditta with Ohio Light Opera. In 1995 he sang the role of Dino in the world premiere of George Chadwick's The Padrone with the Waterbury Symphony at the Thomaston Opera House.

In 1997 Shelton sang the role of Alfredo in Yale University's production of Giuseppe Verdi's La traviata. That same year he was awarded a Richard F. Gold Career Grant by the Shoshana Foundation and became a member of the Young Artist Program at the Central City Opera where he debuted in the role of Hayes in Carlisle Floyd's Susannah. He returned there in 1998 to sing the roles of Reverend Paris in Robert Ward's The Crucible and Cavaradossi in Tosca. He joined the Wolf Trap Opera Company's Young Artist Program for the Summer of 1999, performing there in the roles of Tom Rakewell in The Rake's Progress, the High priest of Neptune in Idomeneo, and Monostatos in The Magic Flute. That same year he sang the role of Laërte in Ambroise Thomas's Hamlet with Washington Concert Opera. In 2000 he was awarded a Richard Tucker Career Grant.

== Career ==
=== Houston Grand Opera ===
In 1998 Shelton became a member of the Young Artist Program at the Houston Grand Opera, remaining in the program through 2000. He made his debut with the company as Malcolm in the 1998 production of Verdi's Macbeth. During his first season with the company he portrayed Count Elemer in Richard Strauss's Arabella with Renée Fleming in the title role, and he was a last minute replacement of an ailing Peter Kazaras as Captain Vere in Billy Budd. He also notably portrayed Laurie in the world premiere of Mark Adamo's Little Women alongside Stephanie Novacek as Jo and Joyce DiDonato as Meg. Shelton reprised the role in 2001 at the HGO in a performance that was recorded live for broadcast on PBS's Great Performances and for commercial release on DVD and CD. He has since performed the role of Laurie numerous times, including productions with the Central City Opera (2001), Opera Omaha (2002), Chautauqua Opera (2002), and New York City Opera (2003).

Shelton's career has continued to be largely based at the HGO, although he often performs with other companies throughout the United States and Europe. Other notable roles with the company include Pinkerton in Giacomo Puccini's Madama Butterfly (1999), both Nereo and Wagner in Boito's Mefistofele (1999), Nemorino in Gaetano Donizetti's L'elisir d'amore (2000), Ferrando in Mozart's Così fan tutte (2001), Arcadio in Daniel Catán's Florencia en el Amazonas (2001), Janek in Leoš Janáček's The Makropolous Case (2002), Camille de Rosillon in Franz Lehár's The Merry Widow (2003), Tamino in Mozart's The Magic Flute (2004), and Don Jose in Georges Bizet's Carmen (2006). He has also sung roles in several more world premieres at the HGO, including Prisoner No. 1 in Tod Machover's Resurrection (1999), Ulises in Catán's Salsipuedes: a Tale of Love, War and Anchovies (2004) and Nico in Adamo's Lysistrata (2005).

Shelton wed Ana María Martínez in 2000, while working at HGO. They divorced in 2007 and have a son, Lucas, together.

=== Other American companies ===
Shelton has performed with numerous opera companies throughout the United States. In 1999 he made his debut with the Lyric Opera of Kansas City as Ferrando in Così fan tutte. He has since returned to that company to perform Tom Rakewell in The Rake's Progress (2001), and Alfredo in La traviata (2009). In 2000 he made his debut with Portland Opera as Cassio in Verdi's Otello, where he later returned to sing the role of Belmonte in Mozart's Die Entführung aus dem Serail (2005).

In 2001 Shelton sang for the first time with Florida Grand Opera as Leo Hubbard in Mark Blitzstein's Regina. In 2002 he made his debut with Dallas Opera as Jaquino in Beethoven's Fidelio, later returning there to sing Alfred in Die Fledermaus (2008). In 2003 he made his debut with Opera Colorado as Don Ottavio in Mozart's Don Giovanni, his debut with Madison Opera as Romeo in Charles Gounod's Roméo et Juliette, and his debut with the Lyric Opera of Chicago performing Leo Hubbard in Regina. That same year he returned to the Central City Opera as Fernando in Goyescas and the title role in Pagliacci. He has since returned again to Central City Opera to sing Ottavio (2006) and Alfredo (2007).

In 2004 Shelton performed in an obscure opera, the role of Pilade in Rossini's Ermione, in a joint production with the New York City Opera and Dallas opera. That same year he sang Sam Polk in Susannah with Chautauqua Opera and Ferrando with Kentucky Opera. In 2005 he made his debut with Arizona Opera as Ferrando in Così fan tutte; later returning there to sing the role of Alfredo (2008). That same year he made his debut with both the Cincinnati Opera and the Opera Company of Philadelphia as George in Richard Danielpour's Margaret Garner. In 2006 he sang Alfredo again in his first performances with both the Nevada Opera and Utah Opera. Shelton reprised the role of Nico in Lysistrata in its New York debut at the New York City Opera in 2006 and at Opera Columbus in 2008. In 2007 he made his debut with Opera Pacific as Don Jose in Carmen, returning there the following year to sing Tamino. He debuted at the San Francisco Opera on October 5, 2007 as Brigadier General Edward Alexander in the world premiere of Philip Glass's Appomattox. In 2009 he sang the Duke of Mantua in Verdi's Rigoletto with Austin Lyric Opera.

Shelton is scheduled to sing the Duke of Mantua with Portland Opera and Don Jose with the Orlando Opera later this year.

=== International opera career ===
Shelton made his international opera debut in 2000 with Opera Australia as Belmonte in Mozart's Die Entführung aus dem Serail. This was followed by his European debut in 2002 as Mitch in André Previn's A Streetcar Named Desire at Opéra national du Rhin in Strasbourg In 2005 he made his debut with the Opéra national de Lorraine as Tamino. He returned there in 2006 to sing the role of Guido Bardi in Alexander von Zemlinsky's Eine florentinische Tragödie, and again in 2008 to sing Lysander in Benjamin Britten's A Midsummer Night's Dream.

Future international engagements include the title role in Mozart's Idomeneo with Opéra national de Lorraine (2009), Lysander with Théâtre de Caen (2009), and Don Ottavio with the Grand Théâtre de Genève (2010) among others.

=== Concert work ===
Although Shelton's career has primarily focused within the field opera, he is no stranger to the concert repertoire. He has been particularly active with the Minnesota Orchestra with whom he has made a number of recordings on the Reference label, including Dominick Argento's Le Tombeau d'Edgar Poe (1999) and Ottorino Respighi's Balkis, Queen of Sheba Suite (2001), the latter of which garnered a Grammy Award nomination. His other performance with the Minnesota Orchestra include the title role in a concert performance of Leonard Bernstein's Candide, Mozart's Requiem, Beethoven's Symphony No. 9, and Janáček's Diary of One Who Vanished (2000).

Shelton has also sung in concert with the Pacific Symphony, Rochester Philharmonic, and at the Colorado Music Festival in performances of Beethoven's Symphony No. 9. He has also sung Handel's Messiah with the Virginia Symphony and Mozart's Requiem with the Mormon Tabernacle Choir. His concert repertoire also includes Mozart's Solemn Vespers and Bach's Magnificat.
