= Lysistrata (opera) =

Opera in two acts by composer Mark Adamo

Lysistrata, or The Nude Goddess
- Opera by Mark Adamo
- Librettist: Mark Adamo
- Language: English
- Based on: Lysistrata by Aristophanes
- Premiere: March 4, 2005; Houston Grand Opera

Lysistrata, or The Nude Goddess is an opera in two acts by composer Mark Adamo. The work is based on Aristophanes's fifth century BCE play Lysistrata. The opera had its world premiere at the Houston Grand Opera on March 4, 2005. It was subsequently produced in March 2006 at the New York City Opera.

== Roles ==
Role	Voice type	Premiere Cast, 4 March 2005 (Conductor: – Stefan Lano)
Lysistrata (Lysia)	soprano	Emily Pulley
Nikias (Nico)	tenor	Chad Shelton
Kleonike	contralto	Myrna Paris
Myrrhine	mezzo-soprano	Laquita Mitchell
Lampito	contralto	Victoria Livengood
Leonidas	bass-baritone	Joshua Winograde
Kinesias	baritone	Joshua Hopkins
Xanthe/Aphrodite	soprano	Marjorie Owens
Sappho	mezzo-soprano	Jennifer Root
Charito/Tisiphone	soprano	Heidi Stober
Dika/Alecto	soprano	Susan Holsonbake
Arete/Megaera	mezzo-soprano	Fiona Murphy
Bion/First Geezer	baritone	Daniel Cilli
Maron/Ares	tenor	Nicholas Phan
Alpheus	tenor	Arturo Chacón Cruz
Philo/Second Geezer	bass-baritone	Nikolay Didenko
Meleagros	tenor	Norman Reinhardt
