= Salsipuedes: a Tale of Love, War and Anchovies =

Opera by Daniel Catán

- Opera by Daniel Catán
- Librettist: Daniel Catán; Eliseo Alberto; Francisco Hinojosa
- Language: Spanish
- Premiere: 29 October 2004; Wortham Theater Center, Houston, Texas

Salsipuedes: a Tale of Love, War and Anchovies is an opera in three acts by Daniel Catán with a Spanish libretto by Eliseo Alberto, Francisco Hinojosa and the composer. The opera was commissioned by the Houston Grand Opera and premiered on October 29, 2004.

Written as a tragicomedy, the work takes place in 1943 on a fictitious island in the Caribbean during World War II. Beginning with a double love story, two newlywed couples are mistakenly taken aboard an island ship where they get tangled in a plot by the corrupt government to sell the Nazis their most valuable commodity–anchovies. The work contains serious overtones and concludes with the newlyweds nearly losing their lives.

The work has no violins or violas and is noted for blending opera with Caribbean instruments and rhythms.

== Roles ==
Role	Voice type	Premiere cast, 29 October 2004 (Conductor: Guido Maria Guida)
Major characters
Ulises	tenor	Chad Shelton
Lucero	soprano	Ana Maria Martinez
Chucho	baritone	Scott Hendricks
Magali	mezzo-soprano	Zheng Cao
General García	tenor	Joseph Evans
Minor characters
Sergeant Guzmán	non-singing	Pablo Bracho
Colonel & Madame Colette	bass-baritone	James Maddalena
El Chino	tenor	Nicholas Phan
Captain Magallanes	baritone	Oren Gradus
Lieutenant	tenor	Jonathan Green
La China	soprano	Heidi Stober
Orquídea	soprano	Laquita Mitchell

== Synopsis ==
=== Act 1 ===
Act 1, Scene 1
The opera opens up with a celebration and double wedding

Scene 1
On the fictional Caribbean island of Salsipuedes, Ulises and Chucho, two famous musicians, have just married sisters Lucero and Magali. While celebrating in the courtyard of hotel Ambos Mundos, the Lieutenant arrives and interrupts the festivities, informing Ulises and Chucho that they must sing the national anthem at an upcoming event.

Scene 2
That evening inside the hotel, Ulises tries to console Lucero, who is upset by the interruption during the celebration. In the next room, Chucho is upset at being told what to do. He is consoled by Magali.

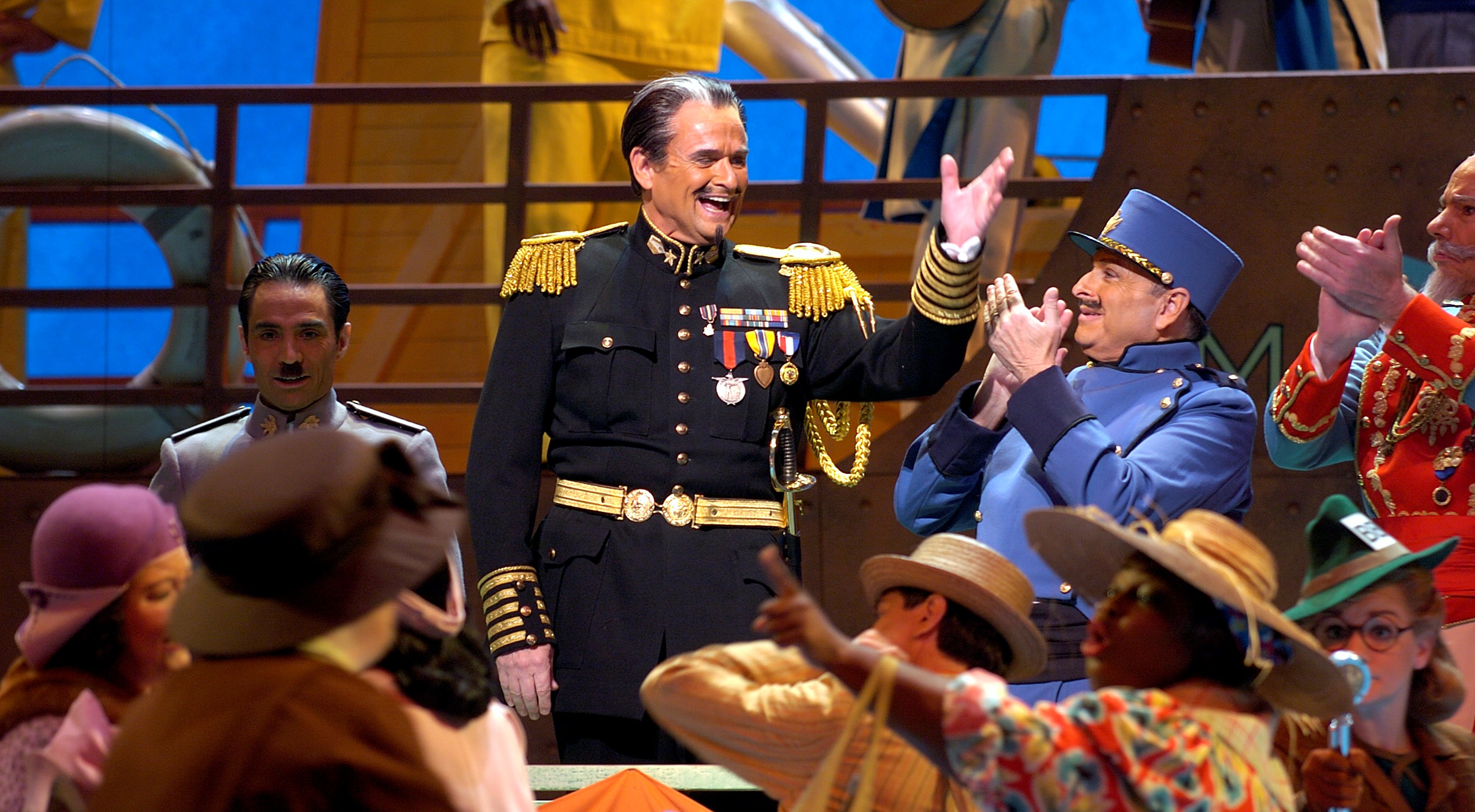
From left to right: Sergeant Guzmán, General García, Lieutenant and Colonel

Scene 3
At the port, crowds gather in preparation of the re-christening of the ship "The Invincible". Sergeant Guzmán introduces General García, who steps up to the podium. The general announces that they are declaring war on Nazi Germany and that the ship will be used to defend the island. Ulises and Chucho step onto a platform behind the military band in preparation for the performance. After the general’s speech, the frigate begins to move from the dock. The two performers quickly realize the platform is attached not to land but to the ship, and that they are sailing off to sea.

=== Act 2 ===
Scene 1
Lucero and Magali are travelling port to port looking for their husbands. Unsuccessful, they share their frustrations and ruminate on how they will get back at their husbands for leaving them.

Act 2, Scene 2
The Captain sings of the greatness of the sea to Chucho and Ulises

Scene 2
Inside the hold of The Invincible, the two musicians complain to Captain Magallanes, asking him to let them off the ship. Describing the greatness and rhythm of the sea, the captain refuses to return the ship to shore. Soon he leaves and Ulises and Chucho discover large quantities of anchovies on the ship.

Scene 3
General García sits at his desk bragging to Guzmán about his brilliant plan. While announcing to the world that Salsipuedes is going to war with the Nazis, he is secretly planning to sell them vast amounts of anchovies for profit. General García and Guzmán celebrate.

Scenes 4 and 5
Tired and weak, Lucero and Magali arrive at Puerto Alegre only to discover that their husbands are not there. Feeling defeated, Lucero breaks down and cries at the prospect of becoming a widow. Magali comforts her and insists that they will find their husbands.

Scene 6
Inside Madame Colette’s bar, Ulises and Chucho wish only to be reunited with their wives. At another table, Madame Colette tells the captain that the Nazis will contact him that night and he will unload the anchovies the following day. Two young girls, La China and Orquídea, recognize Ulises and Chucho as being famous musicians and attempt to flirt with them. The captain announces that they will soon return home. The two girls beg the captain to let them join on the ship.

Scene 7
Lucero and Magali, searching for their husbands, run into La China and Orquídea just outside Madame Colette's bar. Asking if the ship carrying their husbands is at port, La China and Orquídea flirtatiously respond that Chucho and Ulises are expecting them. The wives, assuming infidelity, hide their anger and follow the two girls so that they can see their husbands.

Scene 8
Drunk, Ulises and Chucho stumble out of the bar. Singing only of their love for their wives, Madame Colette helps them board a small boat. The husbands begin rowing toward The Invincible.

=== Act 3 ===
Scene 1
A party begins on The Invincible. Ulises and Chucho, along with La China, Orquídea and others are laughing and drinking. Dressed in disguise, Magali and Lucero arrive. Uninterested in the advances of La China and Orquídea, Chucho and Ulises are immediately drawn to the mysterious women. After drunken conversation, the wives reveal themselves and accuse the men of infidelity.

Scene 2
On the deck of the ship, Magali cries over the supposed betrayal of her husband. Chucho states that he never betrayed her and an argument ensues. Magali breaks down and the two kiss. After moment, Chucho discovers the ship is communicating with a submarine in the water. He then runs off as Lucero and Ulises begin arguing. Chucho returns with Captain Magallanes at gunpoint and accuses him of working with the Nazis.

Scene 3
Back on the island, word has arrived of the scandal with the Nazis. General García is terrified of the consequences of betraying his people. In an attempt to save his name, General García turns to Guzmán and blames him for the corrupt involvement with the Nazis. Unaccepting, Guzmán draws his pistol and kills the general.

Act 3, Scene 4
Ulises and Lucero share their love after learning their ship will soon be destroyed

Scene 4
Sergeant Guzmán announces over the radio that the general has committed suicide and that he has taken the role of President Pro Temp of Salsipuedes. He adds that The Invincible was destroyed by the Germans and there were no survivors. Realizing that the ship is the only trail connecting the scandal to the president, fear spreads on The Invincible that the deal is off and the Nazis will soon attack. Captain Magallanes takes control of the ship and attempts to distract the Nazi submarine. The submarine opens fire and destroys The Invincible.

Scene 5
Both couples, La China, Orquídea and others have escaped on small landing crafts. Floating in the ocean, the survivors tell of the sacrifice made by Captain Magallanes so that they could escape. Land is spotted in the distance and everyone rejoices.

== Recordings ==
There are no recordings of Salsipuedes commercially available as of April 2017.
