= Nora Sourouzian =

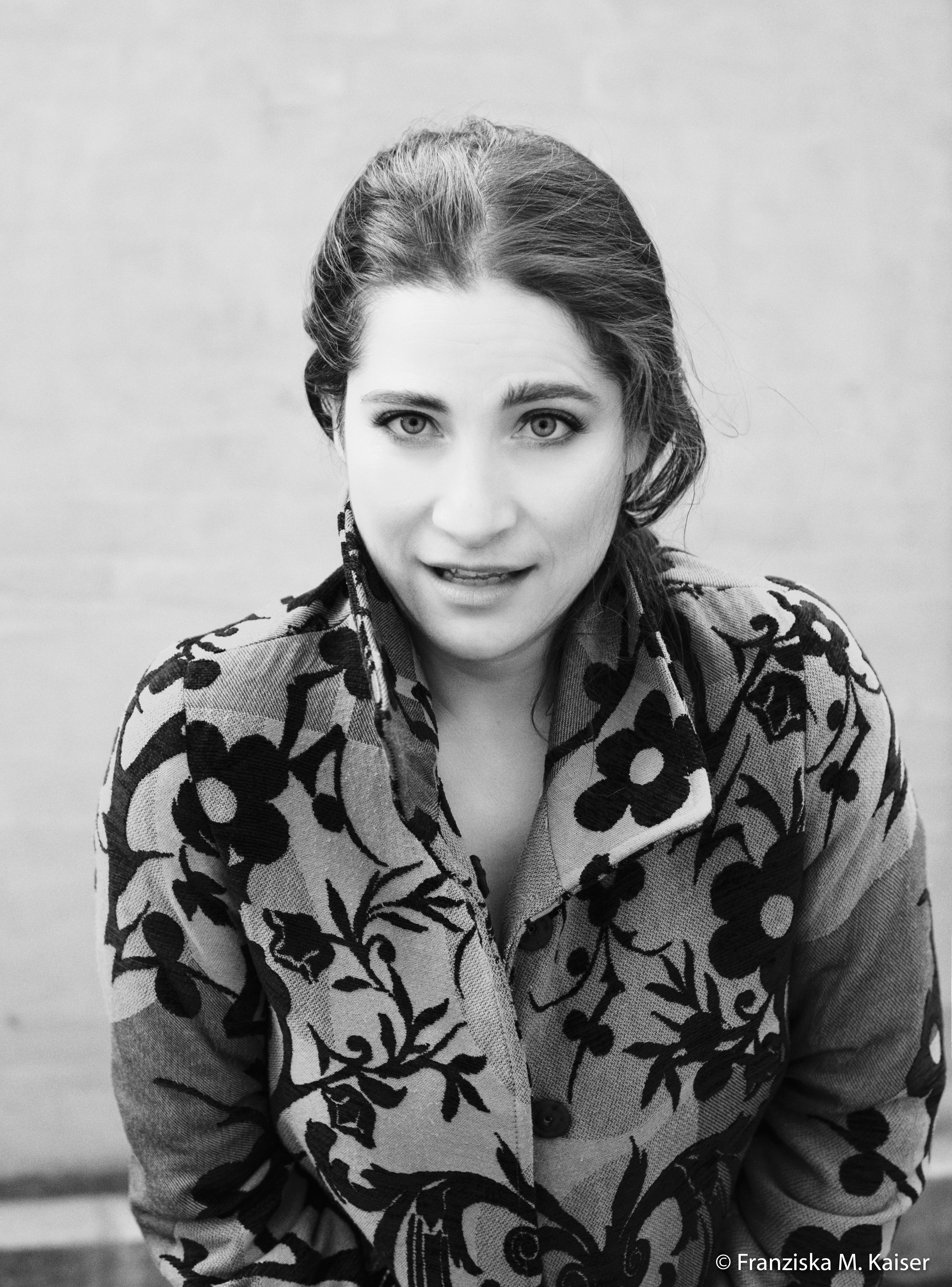
- Nora Sourouzian 2019
- Born: Montreal, Quebec
- Education: McGill University
- Occupation: Singer
- Website: www.norasourouzian.com

Nora Sourouzian is a French-Canadian mezzo-soprano with Armenian roots.

== Early life and education ==
Born in Montreal, Quebec, she studied piano and voice at McGill University with Thérèse Sevadjian. During her time at McGill University she already sang Mrs Herring in Albert Herring, the title roles in Giulio Cesare and Mignon, the Komponist in Ariadne auf Naxos, as well as Hänsel in Hänsel und Gretel with the Orchestre Métropolitain de Montréal.

From 1998 to 1999 she was a member of the Internationaal Opera Centrum Nederland in Amsterdam, where she sang Lucrezia in The Rape of Lucretia.

== Artistic career ==
From 1999 to 2001, Sourouzian was part of the soloist ensemble of Staatstheater Kassel.

Since 2002 Sourouzian is a freelance opera singer. Her career, which leads her all over Europe, parts of USA, Canada, Chile, Asia and Mexico, consists of numerous leading roles both of well-known and rare repertoire. One of her key roles throughout many years has been Carmen which she interpreted in many opera houses such as Welsh National Opera (2004), Klagenfurt, Oper im Steinbruch St. Margarethen (2005), Opéra de Québec, Den Norske Opera (2006), the Teatro Comunale Ponchielli in Cremona] (2008), Opéra de Lausanne and Tokyo (2008–2009), Oper Köln (2009), Leipzig and Bologna, Teatro Lirico di Cagliari (2010), Minnesota (2015). and Palm Beach Opera (2016); She recently appeared in Santiago de Chile with Mahler's Symphony No. 3 and sang Marguerite in La damnation de Faust at the Palacio de Bellas Artes Mexico.

Sourouzian sang leading roles such as: Idamante (Mozart, Idomeneo), Dorabella (Mozart, Così fan tutte), Romeo (Bellini, I Capuleti e i Montecchi), Marguerite (Berlioz, La damnation de Faust), Dulcinée (Massenet's Don Quichotte, production of Laurent Pelly in Palermo), Laura (A. Ponchielli, La Gioconda) and La Favorita (Donizetti, La favorite), Eboli (Verdi, Don Carlo) and Azucena] (Verdi, Il trovatore). Her role debut and strong interpretation of the role at Graz Opera in 2017 was highly acclaimed in the press. In January 2019 she appeared at Seattle Opera also in the role of Azucena.

Alongside well-known repertoire, Sourouzian regularly sings opera roles of rare pieces. She sang Aloès in David Pountney's production of Chabrier's L'étoile under John Eliot Gardiner at Zürich Opera House in 2006, Maria Callas in Michael Daugherty's opera Jackie O in a production of Damiano Michieletto, which is available on DVD. Further she sang the role of Zuléma in Théodore Dubois' Aben-Hamet under Jean-Claude Malgoire, Herodias in Antoine Mariotte's opera Salomé, the role of Florinda in the newly written opera O Rapaz de Bronze by Nuno Côrte-Real, as well as the role of Marfa in Dvořáks opera Dimitrij at Bard SummerScape, New York, in summer 2017. Her interpretation of Thérèse (Massenet, Thérèse) and Anita (Massenet, La Navarraise) at the Wexford Festival 2013 was highly praised in the international press.

Sourouzian collaborates with directors such as Calixto Bieito (Così fan tutte), Robert Carsen (Carmen), Moshe Leiser and Patrice Caurier (Carmen), Christine Mielitz (Così fan tutte), Christof Loy (Carmen), David Pountney (L’Étoile), Barbe & Doucet (Pénélope, Thérèse and La Navarraise) and Vera Nemirova (Rusalka at Theater St. Gallen 2019).

She has so far sung under the baton of conductors like Christoph Eschenbach, Marc Minkowski, Ed Spanjaard, Franz Welser-Möst, Hubert Soudant, Dietfried Bernet, Cyril Diederich, Joseph Rescigno and Nicholas McGegan.

== Competitions ==
- First prize at Prix d'Expression Musicale – 1995
- Winner at Fondation Charles Emiles Gadbois
- First prize at Concours de la Journée de la Musique Française – Montréal 1997
- Second prize at Début-CBC – USA 1997
- First prize at NATS International – 1997
- First prize in all categories at Concours de Musique du Canada 1997
- First prize at Jeunes Ambassadeurs Lyriques 1999
- Finalist at Hans Gabor Belvedere – Vienna 1999
- Finalist at the 3rd Wagnerstimmen Wettbewerb Saarbrücken in 2000

== Recordings ==
- Jackie O, Michael Daugherty
- Salome, R. Strauss
- Atma Classic Gala 30th Anniversaire Montreal
