= Heidi Stober =

American opera singer (born 1978)

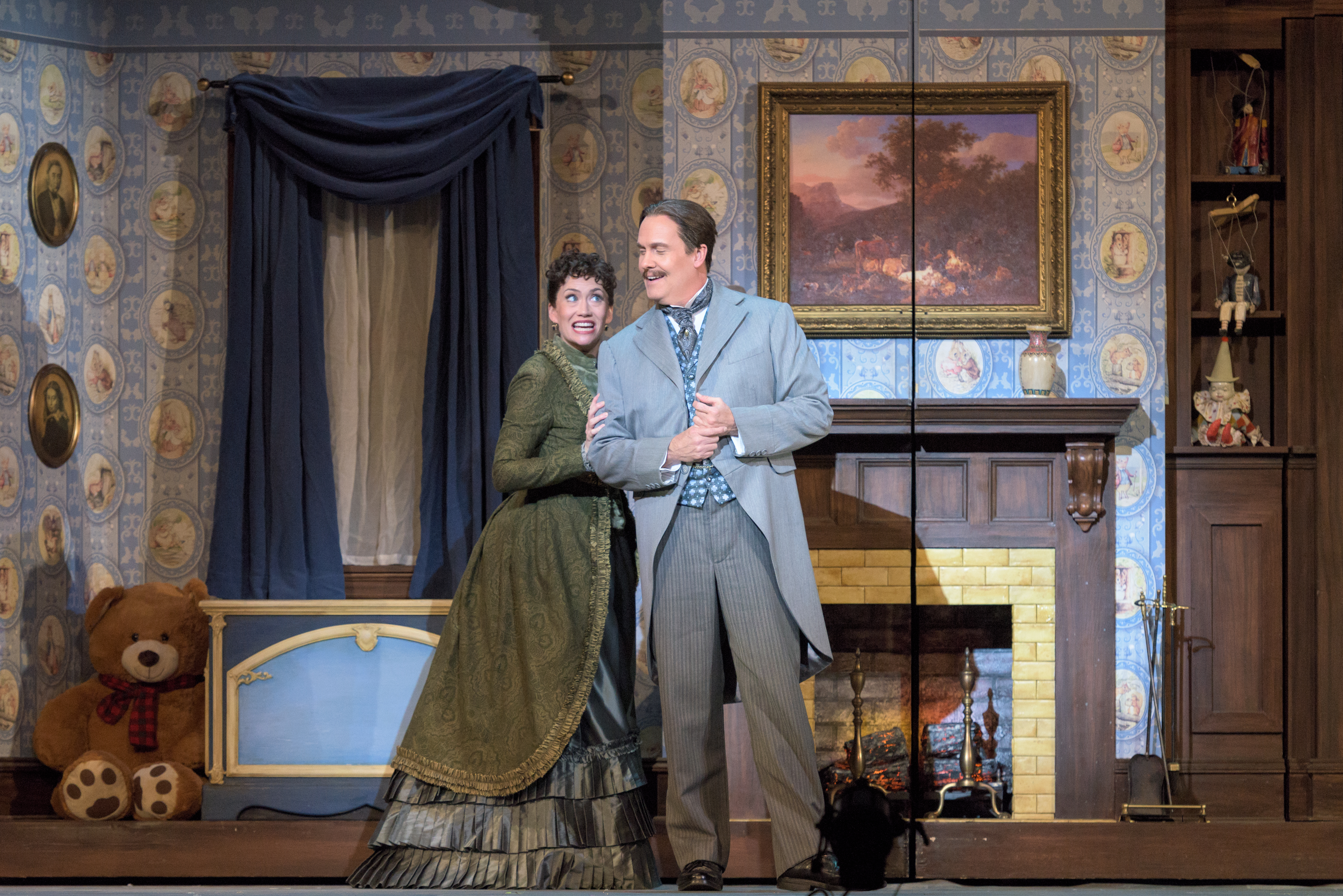
Heidi Stober as Ada Leverson and William Burden as Frank Harris in Oscar at Opera Philadelphia, 2015.

Heidi Stober (born 1978, Wisconsin) is an American operatic soprano who has performed leading roles in major opera houses internationally, including the Dutch National Opera, the Garsington Opera, the Lyric Opera of Chicago, the Metropolitan Opera, the Municipal Theatre of Santiago, the Semperoper, and the Vienna State Opera. She has been particularly active with the Houston Grand Opera where she has performed in more than a dozen operas since 2004, including the world premieres of Daniel Catán's Salsipuedes: a Tale of Love, War and Anchovies (2004), Mark Adamo's Lysistrata (2005), and Ricky Ian Gordon's The House without a Christmas Tree (2017). She has also performed in more than ten operas with the San Francisco Opera since 2010. Since 2008 she has been a resident artist at the Deutsche Oper Berlin where she has primarily performed roles from the lyric soprano repertoire. Also active as a concert soprano on the international stage, she has performed with the Berlin Radio Symphony Orchestra, the Hong Kong Philharmonic Orchestra, the Houston Symphony, the Los Angeles Philharmonic, the New York Philharmonic, the Milwaukee Symphony Orchestra, the Philadelphia Orchestra, the Oslo Philharmonic, and the Radio Filharmonisch Orkest among other orchestras. She is particularly admired for her interpretations of the works of George Frideric Handel and Wolfgang Amadeus Mozart.

== Life and career ==
Born in Wisconsin, Stober grew up in Waukesha, Wisconsin and was a student in the Waukesha School District. She has two older siblings and one younger sibling. She began her musical training as a pianist and initially was interested in pursuing a career as a choral music educator. At Lawrence University she developed an interest in opera and earned a bachelor's degree in vocal performance and pedagogy in 2000 and then a Master of Music degree from the New England Conservatory in 2003. While at Lawrence, Stober studied voice with tenor Ken Bozeman and performed the roles of Laetitia in Gian Carlo Menotti's The Old Maid and the Thief and Countess Almaviva in Mozart's The Marriage of Figaro. At the New England Conservatory she was the recipient of the John Moriarty Presidential Scholarship and performed the roles of the Dew Fairy in Engelbert Humperdinck's Hansel and Gretel and Laurie in Aaron Copland's The Tender Land. She made her professional opera debut in 2001 as Lisa in Vincenzo Bellini's La Sonnambula at the Milwaukee Opera Theatre. In 2002 and 2003 she was a member of the Young Artist Program at the Central City Opera where she notably portrayed the roles of the First Wife and the First Gossip in the world premiere of Henry Mollicone's Gabriel’s Daughter. In 2003-2004 she was an apprentice soprano in the Utah Symphony and Opera Ensemble Program in Salt Lake City.

In 2004 Stober became a member of the Young Artist program at the Houston Grand Opera (HGO) after winning the HGO's Eleanor McCollum Competition for Young Singers. At the HGO she studied voice with Stephen King. She made her debut with the company as La China in the world premiere of Daniel Catán's Salsipuedes: a Tale of Love, War and Anchovies in October of that year. She has continued to perform regularly with the HGO in roles like The Rose in Rachel Portman's The Little Prince (2004), Barbarina in The Marriage of Figaro (2005), Xenia in Boris Godunov (2005), Aphrodite/Charito/Tisiphone in the world premiere of Mark Adamo's Lysistrata (2005), Susanna in The Marriage of Figaro (2005, 2006, and 2016), Frasquita in Carmen (2006), Drusilla in L'incoronazione di Poppea (2006), Norina in Don Pasquale (2006), Blonde from Die Entführung aus dem Serail (2008), Atalanta in Serse (2010), Musetta in La bohème (2012), Cleopatra in Giulio Cesare (2017), and Miss Thompson/Helen Mills/Adelaide Mills in the world premiere of Ricky Ian Gordon's The House without a Christmas Tree (2017).

Stober has also had engagements as a guest artist with numerous American opera companies. In 2002 she gave her first performance with the Boston Lyric Opera as Yvette in Puccini's La rondine; returning there the following year to perform the role of Rosalinde in Johann Strauss II's Die Fledermaus. In 2006 she made her debut with Boston Baroque as Zerlina in Don Giovanni, her debut with Opera Colorado as Pamina in The Magic Flute, her debut with Utah Opera as The First Lady in The Magic Flute, and performed the roles of the Comtesse in Rossini's Le comte Ory and Mozart's Barbarina at the Wolf Trap Opera. In 2007 she returned to the Boston Lyric Opera for performances as Oscar in Verdi's Un ballo in maschera, made her debut at New York City Opera (NYCO) as Poppea in Handel's Agrippina and her debut at the Santa Fe Opera as La Folie/Thalie in Jean-Philippe Rameau's Platée. She returned to the NYCO the following year for performances of Purcell's King Arthur. In 2008 she performed the role of Carolina in Domenico Cimarosa’s comic opera Il Matrimonio Segreto at the Brooklyn Academy of Music and returned to Santa Fe to perform the role of Tigrane in Handel's Radamisto.

Stober joined the roster of Resident Artists at the Deutsche Oper Berlin in 2008 where she currently remains. Roles she has performed in Berlin include Adina in a new production of L'elisir d'amore (2014, 2015, 2016), Ascagne in Les Troyens (2010, 2011), Gretel in Hansel and Gretel (2009, 2010, 2016), Hirt in Wagner's Tannhäuser (2008, 2009), Margueritte in Faust (2017), Micaëla in Carmen (2011, 2012, 2014, 2016, 2018), Nannetta in Falstaff (2009), Oscar in Un ballo in maschera (2009, 2012, 2018), Princess Ninette in Robert Carsen's new production of Prokofiev's The Love for Three Oranges (2012 and 2015), Roggiero in Tancredi (2012), and several Mozart heroines (Pamina (2008, 2009, 2010, 2011, 2012, 2016, 2017), Susanna (2009, 2012, 2014), Zerlina (2011), and Donna Elvira (2018)). In 2010 she made her debut at the San Francisco Opera (SFO) as Mozart's Susanna. She has since returned to the SFO numerous times for performances of Sophie in Werther (2010), Atalanta in Serse (2011), Pamina (2012), Nannetta (2013), Magnolia Hawks in Show Boat (2014), Oscar (2014), Johanna in Sweeney Todd: The Demon Barber of Fleet Street (2015), Norina (2016), and Zdenka in Arabella (2018). She made her South American debut at the Municipal Theatre of Santiago in 2010 as Morgana in Handel's Alcina. In 2011 she made her debut at the Metropolitan Opera as Gretel. She has since returned to the Met to sing the roles of Pamina (2013 and 2014), the Celestial Voice in Verdi's Don Carlos (2015) and Oscar in Verdi's Un ballo in maschera (2015). In 2013 she created the role of Ada Leverson in the world premiere of Theodore Morrison's Oscar with the Santa Fe Opera, and later reprised the role in 2015 at the Opera Company of Philadelphia. In 2015 she portrayed Valencienne in The Merry Widow at the Lyric Opera of Chicago. In 2016 she portrayed Alice B. Toklas in Ricky Ian Gordon's 27 at New York City Center and made her debut at the Vienna State Opera as Adina in L'elisir d'amore. In 2017 she made her United Kingdom debut with the Garsington Opera in the title role of Handel's Semele. At the Semperoper in Dresden she has performed the title role in Handel's Alcina (2016), Micaëla in Carmen (2016) and Adina in L'elisir d'amore (2018).

As a concert soprano, Stober has performed in concerts and recitals internationally. In 2004 she was the soprano soloist in Joseph Haydn's The Creation with the Houston Chamber Choir, and in 2005 she was the soprano soloist in John Rutter's Requiem with the Utah Symphony. In 2006 she sang the soprano solos in Carl Orff's Carmina Burana and Francis Poulenc's Gloria with the Houston Ballet, and gave a recital at the Wolf Trap National Park for the Performing Arts. In 2007 she made her debut in Asia in Christmas concerts with the Hong Kong Philharmonic under conductor John Harding and was the soprano soloist in Johannes Brahms' A German Requiem with the Houston Symphony. In 2008 she was the featured soloist in Gustav Mahler's Symphony No. 4 with the Milwaukee Symphony Orchestra under conductor Edo de Waart and was the featured guest artist for the Philadelphia Orchestra's New Year's Eve Concert under conductor Rossen Milanov. She performed Ludwig van Beethoven's Symphony No. 9 with the Baltimore Symphony Orchestra under Gunther Herbig in 2009 and with the Berlin Radio Symphony Orchestra in 2010 with Marek Janowski.

Stober made her debut with the Oslo Philharmonic in 2010 performing Samuel Barber's Knoxville: Summer of 1915. That same year she performed Anna Truelove in a concert version of Igor Stravinsky's The Rake's Progress with the Saint Paul Chamber Orchestra. In 2011 she performed Mozart's Requiem with the Los Angeles Philharmonic and sang the role of Suor Genovieffa in a concert version of Puccini's Suor Angelica with the Deutsches Symphonie-Orchester Berlin. With the latter orchestra she performed Barber's Knoxville: Summer of 1915 and Mahler's Symphony No. 4 in 2013 under the baton of Mark Wigglesworth. She returned to Los Angeles to perform Stephen Hartke's Symphony No. 4 under conductor Gustavo Dudamel in 2014. In 2015 she gave a recital at Carnegie Hall with Craig Terry serving as her accompanist, performed in concert with Thomas Hampson and Richard Ollarsabaat at the Harris Theater in Chicago, and made her debut with the New York Philharmonic as the soprano soloist in Handel's Messiah. In 2017 she was a featured soloist in Brahm's A German Requiem with the Tucson Symphony Orchestra and gave a recital at the Tucson Desert Song Festival. In 2018 she performed the title role in Handel's Esther with Music of the Baroque, Chicago, Dalila in Handel's Samson with Capella Cracoviensis, the First Lady in Leonard Bernstein's A White House Cantata with the Radio Filharmonisch Orkest, and Beethoven's Ninth Symphony with the Milwaukee Symphony Orchestra.

Stober lives in Berlin.
