= Daniel Belcher =

American operatic baritone

Daniel Belcher is an American operatic baritone who has sung at many of the world's leading opera houses. He notably portrayed the role of John Brooke in the world premiere of Mark Adamo's Little Women and played the role of Andy Warhol in the premiere of Michael Daugherty's Jackie O, both with the Houston Grand Opera (HGO). He is particularly admired for his portrayal of Rossini heroes with Dandini in La Cenerentola and Figaro in The Barber of Seville being two of his signature roles.

== Biography ==
Belcher grew up in St. Joseph, Missouri and attended William Jewell College, where he graduated with a degree in voice in 1992. He then pursued graduate voice studies at the Juilliard School from 1992 to 1996. While attending Juilliard, he spent his summers as a member of Central City Opera's Young Artist Program (1993–1995), singing only as a member of the opera chorus.

From 1997 to 1999 Belcher was a member of the Houston Grand Opera's Young Artist Program. He made his professional opera debut with the company as Andy Warhol in the world premiere of Michael Daugherty's Jackie O on March 14, 1997. He sang several more roles with the company during this time, including Count Dominik in Richard Strauss's Arabella (1998) with Renée Fleming in the title role. and Mr. Lindquist in Stephen Sondheim's A Little Night Music (1999) He also sang in two more world premieres with the company, portraying the role of John Brooke in Mark Adamo's Little Women (1998) and the roles of Baklashov, Prison Inspector, and Prisoner #2 in Tod Machover's Resurrection (1999). He reprised the role of John Brooke with the HGO in a 2001 performance that was recorded live for broadcast on PBS's Great Performances and for commercial release on DVD and CD. He has since performed the role of John Brooke numerous times, including productions with the Central City Opera (2001) and New York City Opera (2003).

In 2002 Belcher made his debut with the San Francisco Opera as Harlequin in Ariadne auf Naxos. He has since returned to the company to portray Dandini in La Cenerentola (2003) and Papageno in The Magic Flute (2008).

In the 2008–2009 season, Belcher performed Marcello in La bohème with the Lyric Opera of Kansas City, Taddeo in L'italiana in Algeri with the Opera Company of Philadelphia, and Ned Keene in Peter Grimes at the Grand Théâtre de Genève.

On February 13, 2011, Daniel Belcher won his first Grammy Award in the category of Best Opera Recording for his work on "Saariaho: L'Amour de Loin", alongside of conductor Kent Nagano, Ekaterina Lekhina & Marie-Ange Todorovitch, and producer Martin Sauer.

On July 10, 2015, Belcher created the role of "Brian" in the world premiere of The Long Walk at Opera Saratoga.

On November 30, 2017, Belcher performed as James Mills in Houston Grand Opera's "The House Without a Christmas Tree" composed by Ricky Ian Gordon and librettist Royce Vavrek.

In 2023 Belcher was appointed to the faculty of the Moores School of Music at the University of Houston as an Instructional Assistant Professor of Voice.
