= Jackie O (opera) =

1997 chamber opera in two acts composed by Michael Daugherty

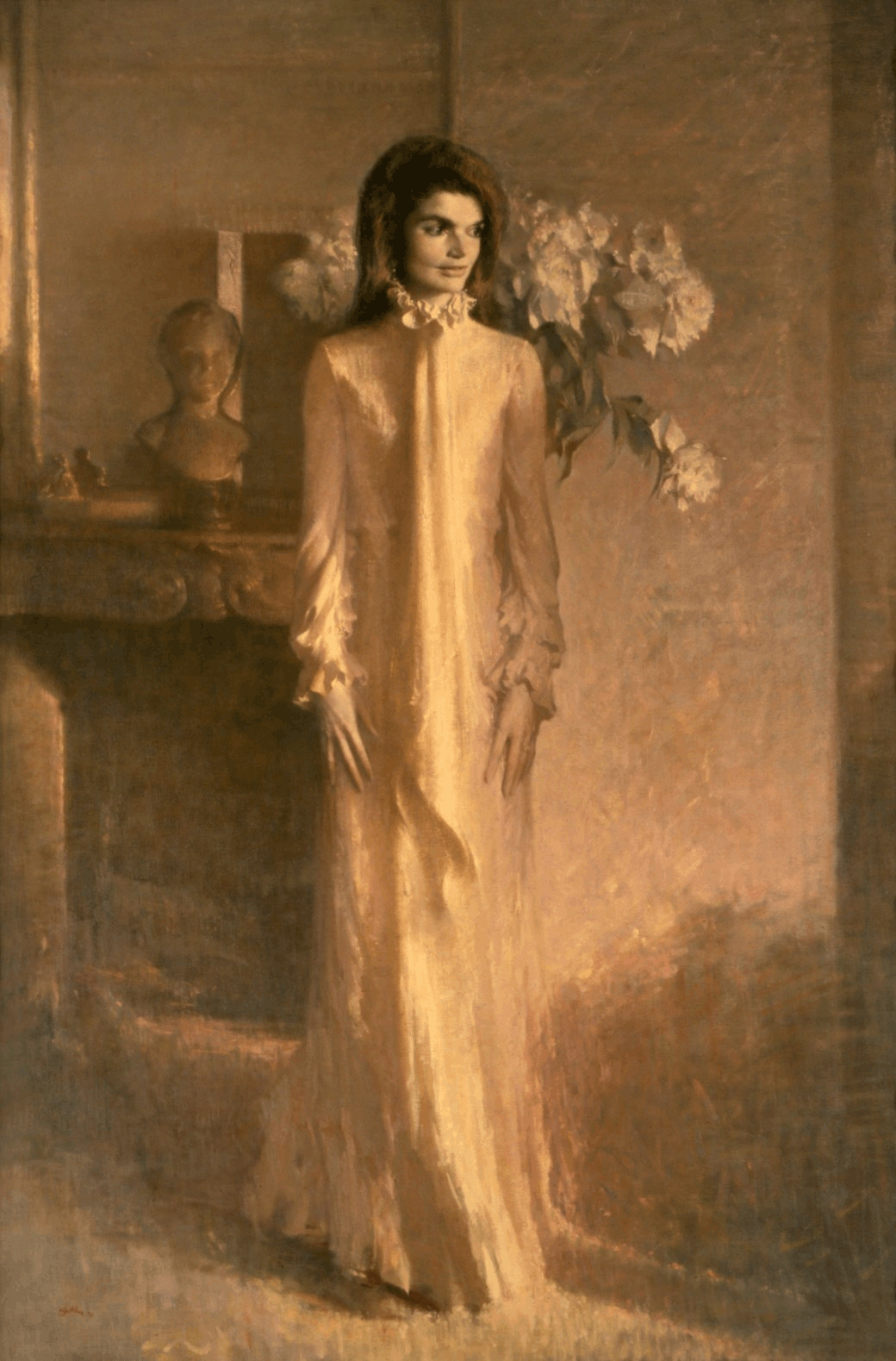
Jackie Kennedy's official White House portrait

Jackie O is a chamber opera in two acts composed by Michael Daugherty to a libretto by Wayne Koestenbaum. The 90-minute work, commissioned by Houston Grand Opera in 1995 and premiered in 1997, is inspired by American musical and popular culture of the late 1960s and episodes in the life of Jacqueline Kennedy Onassis.

== Performance history ==
Jackie O received its first performance in the Cullen Theater, Houston, Texas, on March 14, 1997 with a second performance on March 16, 1997, both conducted by Christopher Larkin. The opera's Canadian premiere took place on August 7, 1997 at the Banff Centre in Alberta, conducted by Bruno Ferrandis. Co-produced by Houston Grand Opera's Houston Opera Studio and the Banff Centre, the premiere production was directed by Nicholas Muni, with sets and costumes by Peter Werner, lighting design by Harry Frehner, and choreography by Bruce Brown, who also created the role of Paparazzo.

The work has subsequently received several other US performances including those by the Duquesne University Opera Workshop in Pittsburgh (1999), Long Leaf Opera in Chapel Hill, North Carolina (2003), and the University of Michigan School of Music, Theatre and Dance in Ann Arbor (2006). Jackie O had its French premiere on February 2, 2002 at the Opéra de Metz, and its Italian premiere on April 3, 2008 in the Teatro Rossini, Lugo, in a co-production with the Teatro Comunale di Bologna.

== Scoring ==
The work is scored for chorus and solo voices (soprano, mezzo-soprano, tenor, baritone and bass) and a 20 piece orchestra of piccolo/flute, oboe/English horn, clarinet/bass clarinet, tenor/alto/soprano saxophone, bassoon, horn, trumpet, trombone/euphonium, tuba, harp, acoustic guitar, synthesizer/piano, percussion and strings.

== Roles ==
Role	Voice type	Premiere Cast, March 14, 1997 (Conductor: - Christopher Larkin)
Jackie O	soprano	Nicole Heaston
Maria Callas	mezzo-soprano	Stephanie Novacek
Grace Kelly	mezzo-soprano	Joyce DiDonato
Andy Warhol	baritone	Daniel Belcher
Aristotle Onassis	bass	Eric Owens
Liz Taylor	soprano	Jonita Lattimore
John F. Kennedy	tenor	John McVeigh
Paparazzo	tap dancer, non-singing role	Bruce Brown

== Synopsis ==
Wayne Koestenbaum has described the loose narrative of his libretto as a "collage" in the style of Gertrude Stein's libretto for Four Saints in Three Acts, an opera by 20th-century American composer, Virgil Thomson. Koestenbaum has written both poetry and non-fiction works on opera and on iconic opera singers like Maria Callas. It is not surprising that in addition to the character of Maria Callas, there are several conscious allusions to the art-form in the Jackie O libretto. These include: Violetta's death aria from La traviata, reflected in Addio Del Passato; the funeral pyre from the final scene of Norma, reflected in The Flame Duet; and both Countess Almaviva's forgiveness aria in The Marriage of Figaro and the off-stage voice of the imprisoned Manrico in Il trovatore, reflected in Jack's Song.

Act I begins with a "happening" in artist Andy Warhol's studio in New York City, attended by various celebrities including Elizabeth Taylor, Grace Kelly, Aristotle Onassis, and his lover, Maria Callas. All eagerly anticipate Jackie and sing Jackie's Coming!. Jackie arrives and is fascinated by Onassis. Callas realizes that Onassis is going to leave her for Jackie and sings Addio Del Passato (Goodbye to the past). Onassis and Jackie escape from the party to see a new art movie, I Am Curious (Yellow).

Act II is set on Onassis' yacht, Christina, and on his private island, Skorpios. Jackie and Onassis have now been married for a year. On the yacht, Jackie becomes increasingly melancholy and given to trance-like states. Maria Callas seeks a reunion with Onassis and the two decide to meet (I Will See You At The Lido). In one of her trances, Jackie wanders off to the island, where she and Maria Callas meet and reconcile with each other as they sing The Flame Duet. Jackie and Callas then smash a paparazzo's camera, which gives Jackie the power to communicate with her dead husband, who is heard as a disembodied voice. She forgives him for his past infidelities in their duet, Jack's Song. The opera ends with Jackie deciding to return to America, wistfully singing The New Frontier Is Here.

== Musical structure ==
Overture - Jackie's Song. (Scored for solo cello, flute/piccolo, bass clarinet, violin, percussion and piano, the piece had previously premiered on its own in 1996 and forms the leitmotif of Jackie in the opera.

Act I. The Happening

1968

Jackie's Coming!

Egyptian Time

Goldfinger

Painter's Credo

Jackie's Credo

Addio Del Passato

I Am Curious (Yellow)

Finale: Don't Look Back

1968 (reprise)

Act II. The Island

Scene 1 (On The 'Christina')

I Resemble A God

Stiff Drink

All His Bright Light

I Will See You At The Lido

Scene 2 (On Skorpios)

The Flame Duet

Smash His Camera!

Jack's Song

The New Frontier Is Here

== Recordings ==
- On CD: Michael Daugherty: Jackie O (Nicole Heaston, John McVeigh, Daniel Belcher, Eric Owens, Joyce DiDonato, Jonita Lattimore, Stephanie Novacek; Houston Grand Opera Orchestra and Chorus, conducted by Christopher Larkin) Label: London Decca/Argo 455 591-2
- On DVD: Jackie O (Fiona McAndrew, Nora Sourouzian, Simone Alberghini, Paul Carey Jones; Christopher Franklin) Label: Dynamic 33605

== Notes and references ==
- Terry Teachout, "Cross Over Beethoven", (review of the Houston premiere) Time Magazine March 31, 1997. Accessed 11 July 2008.
- "20th century icon set to music in opera Jackie O", University of Michigan, February 19, 1997. Accessed 11 July 2008.
- Ulrich, Allan (October 28, 1997). "Sound Recording Review - Daugherty: Jackie O, The Opera". The Advocate (745). Archived from the original on February 16, 2008 – via FindArticles.
