= Stacey Tappan =

American coloratura soprano (born 1973)

Stacey Tappan (born June 13, 1973) is an American coloratura soprano.

Tappan was born in Boston, Massachusetts, and grew up in Pasadena, California. Both her parents are instrumental musicians.

She studied in the voice program at Chapman University (1991–1995) in Orange, California, the Manhattan School of Music (1995–1997), and Juilliard (1997–1999) in New York City. While at the Manhattan School and Juilliard, she studied with Cynthia Hoffmann. Tappan continued her professional training in the Young Artist Program at Santa Fe Opera (1997), the University of Miami in Salzburg program (1998), the Young Artist Program at Opera Theatre of Saint Louis (1999), Wolf Trap Opera Company (2000), and the Lyric Opera Center for American Artists (2001–2003) in Chicago.

She has sung as a soloist with The Metropolitan Opera, Chicago Lyric Opera, Houston Grand Opera, Bangkok Opera, Opera Theatre of Saint Louis, Wolf Trap Opera Company, Glimmerglass Opera, Glyndebourne Opera Festival, and many regional opera houses. She notably portrayed the role of Beth in the Houston Grand Opera's production of Mark Adamo's Little Women which was broadcast on PBS's Great Performances in 2001.

== Partial discography ==
- Little Women: An Opera in Two Acts Ondine 2001

== External references ==
- Stacey Tappan's website
- Lyric Opera Center for American Artists
- St. Louis Opera Theater
- Glimmerglass Opera
