= Brian Castner =

American writer (born 1977)

- Born: Brian Patrick Castner; 1977 (age 48–49); Buffalo, New York, U.S.
- Education: Marquette University; Oklahoma State University
- Occupations: Officer; Writer; Journalist
- Writing career
- Language: English
- Years active: 2012–present
- Genre: non-fiction
- Notable works: The Long Walk; Stampede
- Website: briancastner.com

Brian Patrick Castner (born 1977) is an American author, journalist, former explosive ordnance disposal officer and veteran of the Iraq War. He has authored four books and his writings have been published in The New York Times, Esquire and Wired. Castner is also a Senior Crisis Advisor with Amnesty International's Crisis Response Programme.

== Early life and education ==
Castner was born in 1977, in Buffalo, New York. He attended Marquette University in Milwaukee, Wisconsin, and graduated with a Bachelor of Science in electrical engineering in 1999. Castner cites his Jesuit education as a major influence in his works. After graduating, Castner joined the U.S. Air Force as a civil engineering officer. Later, he received a master's degree in Fire and Emergency Management from Oklahoma State University.

== Career ==
=== Military career ===
Castner graduated Naval School Explosive Ordnance Disposal at Eglin Air Force Base, Florida, in 2003. He served multiple tours of duty in the Middle East and Southwest Asia including in Iraq, Qatar and Saudi Arabia. He led bomb disposal companies in Balad Air Base, Iraq in 2005 and Kirkuk Air Base, Iraq in 2006. His last assignment was Nellis Air Force Base in Las Vegas. Castner left the Air Force in 2007.

=== Writing career ===
Castner's first book The Long Walk was published in 2012 by Doubleday. The book was reviewed by multiple news websites including by Michiko Kakutani in The New York Times, and The New Yorker. Apart from that, The Long Walk was also a NYTBR Editor's Choice and was named an Amazon's Best Books of the Year. Castner was a featured writer at the Miami Book Fair in 2012, on a panel with Jake Tapper and Benjamin Busch.

The American Lyric Theater commissioned an opera adaption of The Long Walk which premiered at Opera Saratoga in 2015. Jeremy Howard Beck composed the music and Daniel Belcher sang the role of Castner. The opera received positive reviews from The New York Times Magazine. The opera was also performed at the Utah Opera in 2017 and the Pittsburgh Opera in 2018.

In 2016, Castner's second book, All the Ways We Kill and Die, was published by Arcade Publishing. Lawrence Freedman, in his book The Future of War, called it "one of the best books of the genre," and Kirkus Reviews described Castner's writing to be evocative and engaging. Passages North called it "the best book about America's involvement in Iraq and Afghanistan over the last fifteen years."

In 2018, Doubleday published Castner's third book, Disappointment River. Writing in The Wall Street Journal, Rinker Buck said Brian Castner's "Disappointment River", a mixed history and travel memoir, goes a long way toward correcting the record of discovery in North America. Castner's fourth book, Stampede was published in 2021. The book is about the Klondike Gold Rush of 1897. Stampede received positive reviews from several book review websites including Kirkus Reviews and The Wall Street Journal.

Castner has twice received grants from the Pulitzer Center on Crisis Reporting. He was also the writer-in-residence at the Chautauqua Institution in 2014. Castner's 2016 story for Adirondack Life, "Three Days in the Santanonis", won a Gold IRMA Award. He was featured on the PBS documentary Going to War which was nominated for an Emmy in 2019.

=== Amnesty International ===
In 2018, Castner joined Amnesty International’s International Secretariat as a Senior Crisis Advisor with the Crisis Response Programme. He has conducted weapons investigations in Ukraine, Iraq, Libya, Somalia, South Sudan and the United States. In August 2021, while conducting war crimes investigations in Afghanistan, he was part of the emergency evacuation from Kabul.

== Bibliography ==
Title	Year	Publisher
The Long Walk	2012	Doubleday
All the Ways We Kill and Die	2016	Arcade Publishing
The Road Ahead (edited with Adrian Bonenberger)	2017	Pegasus Publications
Disappointment River	2018	Doubleday
Stampede	2021	Doubleday
