= Christopher Larkin (conductor) =

American conductor

Christopher Larkin is an American conductor who is best known for his work within the field of opera. He was associate conductor of the Houston Grand Opera for a number of years, where he notably conducted the world premieres of Mark Adamo's Little Women and Michael Daugherty’s Jackie O. He is also the former music director of the New York City Opera National Company. As a guest conductor, Larkin has worked for numerous opera houses including Wexford Festival Opera, Santa Fe Opera, Washington National Opera, Portland Opera, Florentine Opera, Opera Pacific, Opera Carolina, and Boston Lyric Opera among many others. He has also worked as an assistant conductor and vocal coach for the Metropolitan Opera, San Francisco Opera, Opera Company of Philadelphia, Vancouver Opera, and the Canadian Opera Company.
