= Little Women (opera) =

Opera written by Mark Adamo

- Opera by Mark Adamo
- Librettist: Mark Adamo
- Language: English
- Based on: Little Women (1868/69) by: Louisa May Alcott
- Premiere: March 13, 1998; Houston Grand Opera

Little Women (1998) is the first opera written by American composer Mark Adamo to his own libretto after Louisa May Alcott's 1868–69 tale of growing up in New England after the American Civil War, Little Women. The opera also includes text by John Bunyan (Beth's setting of The Pilgrim's Progress), Johann Wolfgang von Goethe (Dr. Bhaer sings "Kennst du das Land" from Wilhelm Meister's Apprenticeship), and Alcott herself (an excerpt of one of her thrillers at the beginning of act 2, which is spoken and mostly omitted on the audio recording).

== Performance history ==
Commissioned by the Opera Studio of Houston Grand Opera (HGO), then under the guidance of General Director David Gockley, Little Women was first performed on March 13, 1998, in a smaller scale production. The success of this first production prompted Gockley to pronounce it "destined to be an American classic" and scheduled the opera for a mainstage premiere of ten performances in March 2000 — making it the first of HGO's twenty-some commissions to be so revived.

G. Schirmer published the opera in May 1998; National Public Radio broadcast the recording of the premiere the following September, and there have been more than 35 distinct productions, professional and academic, domestic and international, since the world premiere, ranging from established American stages (Minnesota Opera, New York City Opera, Opera Pacific), to newer, more progressive companies (Fort Worth Opera, Opera Columbus) from American summer festivals (Glimmerglass Festival, Central City Opera, Chautauqua Opera, Opera in the Ozarks at Inspiration Point), to international venues (Teatro de la Ciudad in Mexico City, World Expo in Tokyo and Nagoya, Japan), and to conservatories (Jacobs School of Music, Anderson University (Indiana), Westminster Choir College, New England Conservatory of Music, Oberlin Conservatory of Music, Rice University, San Francisco Conservatory of Music, University of the Philippines College of Music, DePauw University.)

The American television premiere took place on August 29, 2001, on PBS's Great Performances (a co-production between Houston Grand Opera and Thirteen/WNET New York), and the world premiere recording of the HGO production was released on Ondine on August 28, 2001.

Little Women had its Australian premiere in May 2007 at the Adelaide Festival. The opera premiered in Israel in July 2008 in Tel Aviv. Little Women had its European Premiere in Bruges, Belgium, on August 1, 2009. The Canadian premiere took place on January 30, 2010, performed by the Calgary Opera.

In 2017, Adamo's Little Women saw the big stage again in Houston for the first time since the televised production by the HGO in 2001. This time it was performed by Opera in the Heights and directed by Dashiell Waterbury, his professional debut.

In 2022, the UK premiere of Little Women was staged by Opera Holland Park, directed by Ella Marchment and conducted by Sian Edwards.

== Critical reaction ==
While some critics have argued that the score's reach exceeds its grasp – Opera News suggests that "the nontonal pages never quite mesh with the arias' flights of aching, Bernsteinian lyricism" – critical consensus has largely followed that of John Rockwell of The New York Times, who, on the occasion of the March 2003 New York City Opera premiere, called Little Women a "masterpiece".

== Roles ==
Roles, voice types, premiere casts
Role	Voice type	Premiere cast, March 13, 1998 Conductor: Christopher Larkin	Televised, August 29, 2001 Conductor: Patrick Summers	UK premiere, July 22, 2022 Conductor: Sian Edwards
Jo	mezzo-soprano	Stephanie Novacek	Stephanie Novacek	Charlotte Badham
Laurie	tenor	Chad Shelton	Chad Shelton	Frederick Jones
Meg	mezzo-soprano	Joyce DiDonato	Joyce DiDonato	Kitty Whately
Beth	soprano	Laura A. Coker	Stacey Tappan	Harriet Eyley
Amy	soprano	Jennifer Aylmer	Margaret Lloyd	Elizabeth Karani
John Brooke	baritone	Daniel Belcher	Daniel Belcher	Harry Thatcher
Cecilia March	mezzo-soprano	Katherine Ciesinski	Katherine Ciesinski	Lucy Schaufer
Alma March	mezzo-soprano	Tiffany Jackson	Gwendolyn Jones	Victoria Simmonds
Friedrich Bhaer	bass-baritone (or mezzo-soprano en travesti)	Edward Scott Hendricks	Yuan Chenye	Benson Wilson
Gideon March	bass-baritone	Christopher Scott Feigum	James Maddalena	Nicholas Garrett
Mr. Dashwood	bass-baritone	Christopher Scott Feigum	Derrick Parker	Dragoș Andrei
Director		Peter Webster	Brian Large	Ella Marchment
