= Tiffany Jackson (soprano) =

American operatic soprano

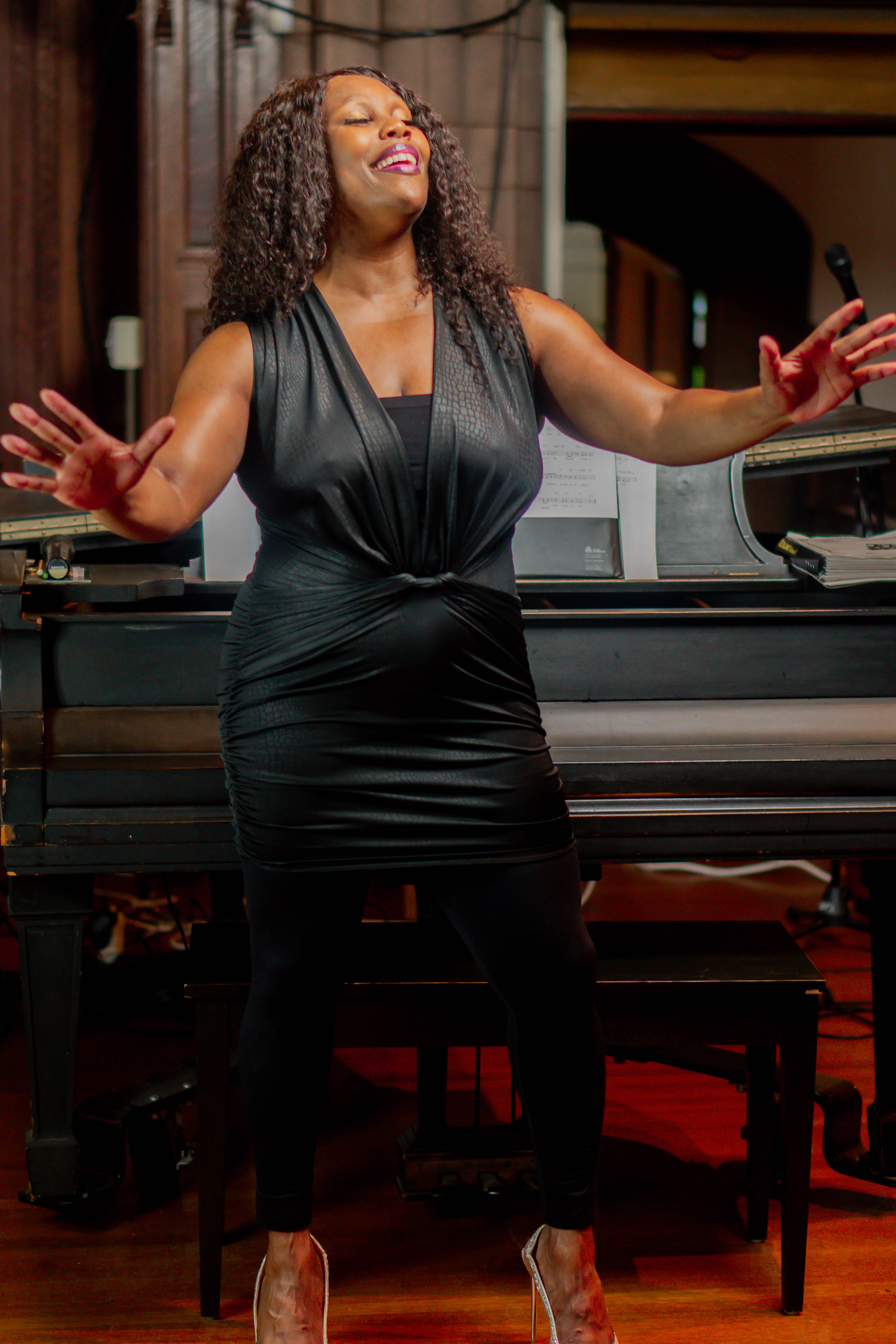
Jackson in 2020

Tiffany Renée Jackson (born 1971) is an American jazz and operatic soprano. She created the role of Alma March in the world première of Mark Adamo's opera Little Women. She was born in Philadelphia and studied at the University of Michigan (Bachelor of Music), Yale University School of Music (Artist Diploma and Master of Music), and the Manhattan School of Music (Professional Studies Certificate). Jackson earned her Doctor of Musical Arts degree at the University of Connecticut School of Fine Arts.

Jackson created an autobiographical one-woman show, From the Hood to the Ivy League, which debuted in 2019. In it, Jackson discusses her experience growing up in the African-American ghetto, singing operatic music styles as an African American and eurocentrism in music, her experience with teaching and bodybuilding, and racism in America.

Jackson joined Western Carolina University in 2021 as an Assistant Professor of Music. She directs the university's small commercial voice ensemble, the Catamount Singers.

Jackson appeared on "America's Got Talent".
