= Edoardo Müller =

Italian conductor (1938–2016)

Edoardo Müller (June 16, 1938, in Trieste – June 24, 2016, in Milan) was an Italian conductor who was chiefly recognized for his interpretations of bel canto operas. A frequent guest conductor with opera houses internationally, he had a lengthy association with the San Diego Opera which spanned 31 years. He was also an accomplished pianist who accompanied several notable singers in recitals and concerts; including Carlo Bergonzi, Renato Bruson, Montserrat Caballé, José Carreras, Leyla Gencer, Elena Obraztsova, and Renata Tebaldi. His work is preserved on recordings made for the Philips, BMG, Bongiovanni, and Orfeo record labels. He served as conductor for Joyce DiDonato's 2009 CD Colbran, the Muse: Rossini Opera Arias.

== Life and career ==
Born in Trieste, Italy, Müller began his career as a pianist before becoming assistant conductor to several well known conductors; including Karl Böhm, Carlos Kleiber, Claudio Abbado and Francesco Molinari-Pradelli. In 1973 he made his professional conducting debut leading a performance of Gioachino Rossini's Mosè in Egitto at the Maggio Musicale Fiorentino. In 1980 he joined the conducting staff at the San Diego Opera where his first assignment was leading the West Coast premiere of Giuseppe Verdi's Giovanna d'Arco. He remained with the company for 31 seasons; including serving as principal conductor of the company from 2005 until 2011.

In 1984 Müller made his debut at the Metropolitan Opera conducting a performance of Rossini's The Barber of Seville with Leo Nucci as Figaro and Julia Hamari as Rosina. He conducted a total of 146 performances for the Met over a 22-year period; including performances of I puritani, La Cenerentola, La fille du régiment, La traviata, L'elisir d'amore, and Roméo et Juliette. His final assignment for the Met was leading a production of Lucia di Lammermoor with Elizabeth Futral in the title role in 2006. Other companies for whom he conducted included the Bavarian State Opera, the Canadian Opera Company, the Dallas Opera, the Houston Grand Opera, La Fenice, La Scala, the Liceu, the Lyric Opera of Chicago, Michigan Opera Theatre, Opéra de Nice, Opera Philadelphia, the Seattle Opera, the Teatro Colón, the Teatro Comunale di Bologna, the Theatro Municipal in Rio de Janeiro, and the Washington National Opera among others.

Müller taught on the faculty of the American Institute of Musical Studies in Graz, Austria.
