= Stephanie Novacek =

American operatic mezzo-soprano

Stephanie Novacek (b. Iowa City, Iowa, 31 August 1970) is an American operatic mezzo-soprano who has appeared at many of the world's opera houses. A regular performer at the Houston Grand Opera and Opera Atelier, Novacek is especially known for her performances in contemporary operas and in obscure operas, particularly baroque works, outside of the standard repertory. Opera News has described her voice as a "rich, seamless flow of solid silk" and an actress "with always a strong presence on stage".

== Career ==
Novacek studied voice at the University of Illinois at Urbana-Champaign (M. Mus. 1995) and began her career in 1996 as a member of the Young Artist Programs at the Santa Fe Opera in New Mexico and the Houston Grand Opera (HGO) in Texas. She made her professional opera debut that year as The Page of Herodias in Richard Strauss's Salome with HGO and her career has largely been based with that company ever since. With Santa Fe Opera she appeared in productions of Stravinsky's The Rake's Progress, Puccini's Madama Butterfly, and the world premiere of Tobias Picker's Emmeline as a member of the chorus during the summer of 1996.

With HGO Novacek created the roles of Maria Callas in Michael Daugherty's Jackie O in 1997 and Jo March in Mark Adamo's Little Women in 1998. Her role in the latter received particular praise from critic Matthew Gurewitsch of the New York Times stating, "In Stephanie Novacek's portrayal of Jo March, Mr. Adamo's heroine, a star was born." Novacek appears on CD recordings of both operas and her performance of Jo March was recorded for DVD and broadcast on PBS's Great Performances in 2001. Novacek's many other roles with HGO include Hänsel in Humperdinck's Hänsel und Gretel, Messaggera in Monteverdi's L'Orfeo, Marcellina in Mozart's Le nozze di Figaro, Siebel in Gounod's Faust, Maddalena in Verdi's Rigoletto, Olga in Tchaikovsky's Eugene Onegin, Suzuki in Puccini's Madama Butterfly and the title role in Bizet's Carmen among others.

The recipient of numerous honors, Novacek was awarded a Richard F. Gold Career Grant in 1997 by the Shoshana Foundation, a Sullivan Foundation Grant in 1999, and in 2000 she won a Richard Tucker Career Grant. In 2001 she was chosen to be America's representative to the prestigious BBC Cardiff Singer of the World competition. She was nominated for a Dora Mavor Moore Award in 2002 for her portrayal of the title role in Marc-Antoine Charpentier's Médée with Opera Atelier.

Novacek has also made appearances with several other notable opera companies and ensembles. She sang both Dido and the Sorceress in Henry Purcell's Dido and Æneas with the Mark Morris Dance Group at the Brooklyn Academy of Music in 1998. That same year she made her European debut at the Zurich Opera singing The Page of Herodias. In 1999 she made her debut with the Washington National Opera as Enrichetta in Vincenzo Bellini's I puritani and sang the roles of Baba the Turk in Stravinsky's The Rake's Progress and the Third Lady in Mozart's Die Zauberflöte with the Wolf Trap Opera Company. In 2000 she made her debut with the Opera Company of Philadelphia and the Cincinnati Opera as The Page of Herodias in Richard Strauss's Salome and she portrayed Dinah in Leonard Bernstein's Trouble in Tahiti in a film version made by the BBC Wales. In 2001 she made her debut with the Canadian Opera Company as Ottavia in L'incoronazione di Poppea, a role she also performed with HGO that year.

In 2004 Novacek sang the role of Anner in Virgil Thomson's The Mother of Us All in her debut with the San Francisco Opera and made her debut with Grand Théâtre de Genève as Alyeya in Leoš Janáček's From the House of the Dead. That same year she performed and recorded the role of Cassiope in Jean-Baptiste Lully's Persée with Opera Atelier for both CD and DVD, and she sang the role of Madame in the United States premiere of Peter Bengston's The Maids with Cincinnati Opera. In 2005 she sang the role of Suzuki in Puccini's Madama Butterfly in her debut at the Royal Opera House, Covent Garden and the title role in Lully's Armide with Opera Atelier.

In 2006 Novacek appeared in recital at Carnegie Hall with composers Ricky Ian Gordon and Jake Heggie who played their own works on the piano while she sang. That same year she sang the role of Laura in Alexander Dargomyzhsky's The Stone Guest with the American Symphony Orchestra under conductor Leon Botstein at Avery Fisher Hall, performed the role of Maddalena with Madison Opera, portrayed Messaggera in Monteverdi's Orfeo with Opera Atelier, and sang the role of Annina in Richard Strauss's Der Rosenkavalier in her debut with the Lyric Opera of Chicago. In 2007 she returned to Opera Atelier to portray the role of Penelope in Claudio Monteverdi's Il ritorno d'Ulisse in patria. In 2008 she sang the role of Marcellina in Mozart's Le nozze di Figaro with Atlanta Opera.
