= Shoshana Foundation =

- Formation: 1986
- Type: Nonprofit organization
- Headquarters: Vallejo, CA, United States
- President: Flavia Gale
- Key people: Barden Gale; Camilla Gale; Zachary Aarons; Amelia H. Ross; William E. Odenkirk; Scot Askildsen
- Revenue: $543,150 (2015)
- Expenses: $64,109 (2015)
- Website: www.shoshanafoundation.org

The Shoshana Foundation is a non-profit organization that was founded in 1986 upon the death of Richard F. Gold who was a long time administrator at both the New York City Opera and Chamber Opera Theater of New York. The foundation's work focuses on assisting promising opera singers at the start of their careers by providing The Richard F. Gold Career Grant to young singers nominated by their music school and opera apprenticeship program. Applications and requests to audition by singers are not accepted. Music schools currently involved in the scholarship program include the Juilliard School Opera Center, the Manhattan School of Music, and the Mannes College of Music among others. Opera apprenticeship programs include the Lyric Opera of Chicago, Houston Grand Opera, Los Angeles Opera, San Francisco Opera, New York City Opera, Glimmerglass Opera, and the Wolf Trap Opera Company. Winners are asked to give at least one charity performance in the year following their award, the expenses of which are met by the foundation.

== Grant recipients ==
Notable winners of The Richard F. Gold Career Grant include:

- Renée Fleming (1987)
- Denyce Graves (1989)
- Brian Asawa (1991)
- Christine Goerke (1993)
- David Daniels (1994)
- Eric Owens (1994)
- Stephanie Blythe (1995)
- Chad Shelton (1997)
- Stephanie Novacek (1997)
- Michael Maniaci (2002)
- Ailyn Pérez (2006)
- Brenda Rae (2006)
- Isabel Leonard (2007)
- Kate Lindsey (2007)
- Tamara Wilson (2007)
- Jamie Barton (2009)
- Anthony Roth Costanzo (2009)
