= Tod Machover =

American composer (born 1953)

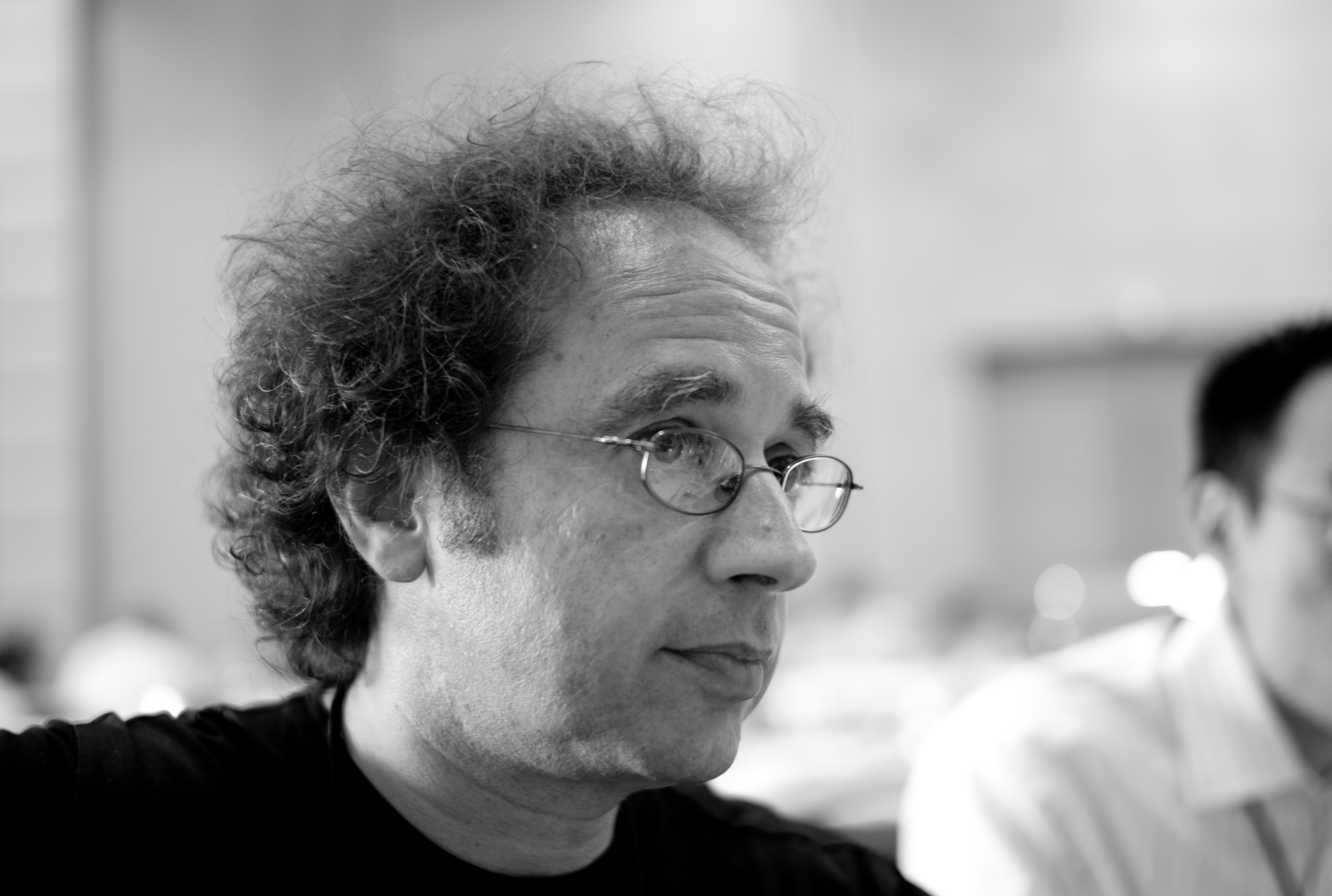
- Tod Machover in Barcelona 2006
- Born: November 24, 1953 (age 72)

Tod Machover (born November 24, 1953, in Mount Vernon, New York) is an Emmy-award winning composer, inventor of hyperinstruments and hyperscore software, promoter of music AI and participatory opera, and professor at the MIT Media Lab.

He was named Director of Musical Research at IRCAM in 1980. Joining the faculty at the new Media Laboratory of the Massachusetts Institute of Technology (MIT) in 1985, he became Professor of Music and Media and Director of the Experimental Media Facility. Currently Professor of Music and Media at the MIT Media Lab, he is head of the Lab's Hyperinstruments/Opera of the Future group and has been co-director of the Things That Think (TTT) and Toys of Tomorrow (TOT) consortia since 1995. In 2006, he was named visiting professor of composition at the Royal Academy of Music in London. He has composed significant works for Yo-Yo Ma, Joshua Bell, Matt Haimovitz, the Ying Quartet, the Boston Pops, the Los Angeles Philharmonic, Penn & Teller, and many others, as well as designed and implemented various interactive systems for performance by Peter Gabriel and Prince. Machover gave a keynote lecture at NIME-02, the second international conference on New Interfaces for Musical Expression, which was held in 2002 at the former Media Lab Europe in Dublin, Ireland, and is a frequent lecturer worldwide. Machover is a Finalist for the 2012 Pulitzer Prize in Music for his opera Death and the Powers. He was the first recipient of the Arts Advocacy Award from the Kennedy Center's National Committee of the Performing Arts in 2013.

== Education ==
He attended the University of California, Santa Cruz in 1971 and received a BM and MM from the Juilliard School in New York where he studied with Elliott Carter and Roger Sessions (1973–1978). He also started his Doctoral studies at Juilliard before being invited as Composer-in-Residence to Pierre Boulez's new Institut de Recherche et Coordination Acoustique/Musique (IRCAM) in 1978.

== History ==
In the fall of 1978, Tod Machover arrived at IRCAM in Paris, and was introduced to Giuseppe di Giugno's digital synthesizer 4 series. Light was premiered at the Metz Festival in November 1979 using the 4C synthesizer, the brainchild of di Giugno's concept that "synthesizers should be made for musicians, not for the people that make them." (Electric Sound, p. 181). In 1981, he composed Fusione Fugace for solo performance on a real-time digital synthesizer called the 4X machine, the first prototype of his hyperinstruments. During his time at IRCAM in 1986 and 1987, he was motivated to score for keyboard and percussion duet with emphasis on extending their performance into many complex sound layers. His first opera VALIS used di Giugno's 4X system to process voices, which foreshadowed his concept of the hyperinstrument (term coined in 1986) and his experiment of AI opera in 2023.

At MIT's Media Lab, he developed methods for taking many more sophisticated measurements of the instrument as well as the performer's expression. He focused on augmenting keyboard instruments, percussion, strings, even the act of conducting, with the goal of developing and implementing new technology to expand the function of the musical instruments and their performers. He propelled forward-thinking research in the field of musical performance and interaction using new musical and technological resources.

Originally concentrated to the enhancement of virtuosic performance, his research has expanded in a direction of building sophisticated interactive musical instruments for non-professional musicians, children, and the general public. He premiered 'Brain Opera' in 1996, an interactive music experience with hyperinstruments designed for anybody to play using their natural skills, aiming at making every human being into a musician. He became finalist of the 2012 Pulitzer Prize in Music for his opera Death and Powers (premiered in 2010), an innovative opera that merges morphing objects and sculptural sounds to explore profound themes of legacy, human existence, and technological transcendence. His most recent opera "Schoenberg in Hollywood" (premiered in 2018) explores the difficult balance between art and mass appeal through the journey of Arnold Schoenberg.

== Hyperinstruments ==
Tod Machover devised the concept of hyperinstruments: an extension of existing instruments which can morph the sounds into other instruments, objects, or the entire orchestra based on the performer's motions. The Hyperinstrument project, initiated in 1986 by the MIT Media Lab under Tod Machover, aims to create technologically augmented musical instruments that enhance the expressive capabilities of virtuosic performers. These instruments were designed to expand the possibilities of traditional instruments like guitars, keyboards, percussion, and strings, as well as to augment conducting. They have been utilized by renowned artists and organizations including cellist Yo-Yo Ma, the Los Angeles Philharmonic, musician Peter Gabriel, and the illusionists Penn & Teller.

Tod Machover of MIT Media Lab unveils the Hyper-Glove and conducts musicians at CyberArts International 1990.

Beginning in 1992, the project's scope broadened to include the development of sophisticated interactive musical systems for non-professionals, including students and music enthusiasts. Systems like "Drum-Boy" and "Joystick Music" enabled users to create complex music through intuitive gestures or descriptive language, influencing a real-time interactive environment.

Subsequent research has pursued a dual focus: refining high-level professional systems capable of capturing subtle nuances of human performance, and creating powerful interactive entertainment systems for the public, such as music learning tools and Internet-based collaborative platforms. The core research involves designing computer systems—comprising sensors, signal processing, and software—to measure and interpret human expression and feeling. This work also explores new modalities and content for interactive art and entertainment.

The concept of hyperinstruments has since been extended to include the gestural control of visual media, as seen in installations like the "Meteorite Museum." Recent projects range from new instruments designed for children and amateurs to high-end systems capable of transforming large-scale performances, such as those by a full symphony orchestra or in opera.

== Hyperscore ==
A composing software developed by Tod Machover that allows users to compose using lines and graphics without any knowledge in music theory or notation.

== City Symphony ==
It's a project launched by Tod Machover that invites everyone to participate in the creating of a symphony. He launched the first city symphony Toronto Symphony under Opera of the Future in 2012, a participatory symphony where sounds are collected from the city, and the music is created by audiences and the composer.

He later launched Philadelphia Voices in 2017 and invited people to submit their recordings online to collaborate with the composer. He gave up his position as a composer to the public; what people heard was not his voice, but the voices of all the participants — the voice of Philadelphia.

== Opera of the Future ==
Opera of the Future is a research group led by composer Tod Machover at the MIT Media Lab that explores new concepts and technologies to advance the future of music composition, performance, learning, and expression. It focuses on integrating technology and art to create innovative musical works and interactive experiences. Tod Machover launched the "City Symphony" project under Opera of the Future in 2012. City Symphony is a participatory symphony where sounds are collected from the city, and the music is created by audiences and the composer. Key representative works include:

- Valis: an opera in two parts (1987) based on Philip K. Dick's novel VALIS
- Brain Opera (1996), an original, interactive musical experience that included contributions from both on-line participants and live audiences. It toured Europe, Asia, the United States and South America from 1996 to 1998 and was permanently installed at Vienna's House of Music in the spring of 2000.
- Resurrection (1999) at Houston Grand Opera with Joyce DiDonato) (based on Leo Tolstoy's last novel)
- Skellig (2008), an opera based on the novel of the same name by David Almond
- Death and the Powers (2010), an opera with live electronics and robotics developed by the M.I.T. Media Lab. Libretto by Robert Pinsky Powers
- Schoenberg in Hollywood (2018), commissioned by the Boston Lyric Opera, premiered in Boston and later performed in Vienna. It examines the tension between artistic integrity and mass appeal through the story of composer Arnold Schoenberg.
- Gammified (2019), created for the Kronos Quartet and inspired by MIT neuroscience research on the potential of 40 Hz auditory and visual stimulation to treat Alzheimer’s disease.
- Philadelphia Voices (2018), commissioned by the Philadelphia Orchestra and premiered at the Kimmel Center and Carnegie Hall.
- Overstory Overture (2023), commissioned by the International Sejong Soloists and premiered at Lincoln Center, featuring mezzo-soprano Joyce DiDonato.
- FLOW Symphony (2024), premiered by the Sejong Soloists in Seoul, following the success of Overstory Overture.

== Compositions ==
- Ye Gentle Birds (1979) for soprano, mezzo-soprano and wind ensemble
- Fresh Spring (1977) for baritone solo and large chamber ensemble
- With Dadaji in Paradise (1977–'78, rev. 1983) for solo cello
- Two Songs (1978) for soprano and chamber ensemble
- Concerto for Amplified Guitar (1978) for amplified acoustic guitar and large chamber ensemble
- Deplacements (1979) for amplified guitar and computer-generated tape
- Light (1979) for chamber orchestra and computer electronics
- Soft Morning, City! for soprano, double bass, and computer-generated tape
- Winter Variations (1981) for large chamber ensemble
- String Quartet No. 1 (1981)
- Fusione Fugace (1981–'82) for keyboard, two specialized interfaces, and live 4X digital synthesizer
- Chansons d'Amour (1982) for solo piano
- Electric Etudes (1983) for amplified cello, live and pre-recorded computer electronics
- Spectres Parisiens (1983–'84) for flute, horn, cello, chamber orchestra and computer electronics
- Hidden Sparks (1984) for solo violin
- Famine (1985) for four amplified voices and computer-generated sounds
- Desires (1985–'89) for symphony orchestra
- Nature's Breath (1988–'89) for chamber orchestra
- Towards the Center (1988–'89) for amplified flute, clarinet, violin, cello, electronic keyboard and percussion, with five hyperinstrument electronics
- Flora (1989) for pre-recorded soprano and computer-generated sound
- Bug Mudra (1989–'90) for two guitars (electric and amplified-acoustic), electronic percussion, conducting dataglove, and interactive computer electronics
- Begin Again Again … (1991) for Yo-Yo Ma and hypercello Hyperstring Trilogy Archived 2012-02-08 at the Wayback Machine
- "Song of Penance" (1992) for hyperviola and chamber orchestra Hyperstring Trilogy Archived 2012-02-08 at the Wayback Machine
- "Forever and Ever" (1993) for hyperviolin and orchestra Hyperstring Trilogy Archived 2012-02-08 at the Wayback Machine
- Hyperstring Trilogy (1991–'93, rev. 1996–'97) for hypercello, hyperviola, hyperviolin and chamber orchestra Hyperstring Trilogy
- Bounce (1992) for hyperkeyboards, Yamaha Disklavier Grand piano and interactive computer electronics
- He's Our Dad (1997) for soprano, keyboard and computer-generated sound
- Meteor Music (1998) interactive installation Meteorite Museum
- "Sparkler" (2001) for orchestra and interactive computer electronics Sparkler
- "Toy Symphony" (2002/3) for hyperviolin Children's Chorus, Music Toys, and Orchestra Toy Symphony
- "Mixed Messiah" (2004), a 6-minute remix of Handel's Messiah Mixed Messiah
- "I Dreamt A Dream" (2004) for youth chorus, piano and electronics
- "Sea Soaring" (2005) for flute, electronics, and live audience interaction Music Garden
- ...but not simpler... (2005) Not Simpler
- Jeux Deux (2005) for hyperpiano and orchestra Jeux Deux
- Another Life (2006) for nine instruments and electronics
- "VinylCello" (2007) for amplified cello, DJ and live computer electronics Archived 2012-02-08 at the Wayback Machine
- "Spheres and Splinters" (2010) for hypercello, spatialized audio reproduction, and visuals Spheres and Splinters Archived 2013-01-09 at the Wayback Machine
- "Open up the House" (2013) for soprano and piano National Opera Center America Archived 2015-01-28 at the Wayback Machine
- A Toronto Symphony: Concerto for Composer and City (2013) for orchestra and electronics composed with the citizens of Toronto A Toronto Symphony
- Festival City (2013) for orchestra and electronics composed with the public for the Edinburgh International Festival
- Between the Desert and the Deep Blue Sea: A Symphony for Perth (2014) for orchestra and electronics composed with the public for the Perth International Arts Festival
- Breathless (2014) for flute, orchestra and electronics Bemidji Symphony Orchestra
- Time and Space (2015) for orchestra, inspired by the essays of Michel de Montaigne
- A Symphony for Our Times (2015) for live piano and recorded orchestra and electronics, for the closing performance of the World Economic Forum Annual Meeting in 2015
- Restructures (2015) for two pianos and electronics, tribute to Pierre Boulez premiered at the 2015 Lucerne Festival
- Eine Sinfonie für Luzern (2015) for orchestra and electronics, created with the public for the 2015 Lucerne Festival
- Fensadense (2015) for ten musicians and hyperinstruments with live electronics, premiered at the 2015 Lucerne Festivalra
- "Symphony in D" (2015) for orchestra, voice, additional performers and electronics, premiered by the Detroit Symphony
- "Philadelphia Voices" (2018) for four choirs, to be premiered by Westminster Choir College's Symphonic Choir at the Kimmel Center and Carnegie Hall.
- "FLOWSymphony" (2024) for string orchestra and electronics premiered at the Seoul Arts Center.

== Critics and Reviews ==
Critics review that his opera VALIS blend diverse elements to create a novel yet fragmented whole, lacking cohesion with only intermittently engaging music. But it deserves credit for pointing towards the new form of opera that integrates instrumental performance and computer music.

Tod Machover's Schoenberg in Hollywood offers a creatively ambitious and musically complex portrayal of the composer's life, blending historical narrative with phantasmagoric elements and multimedia. While the production features impressive performances and a clever libretto, it is occasionally undermined by excessive theatricality, amplification issues, and an uneven tone. Nonetheless, the opera succeeds as a thought-provoking and imaginative exploration of Schoenberg’s artistic and personal journey in Los Angeles.

== Journal articles ==
- Machover, Tod (October 2004). "Shaping Minds Musically" (PDF). BT Technology Journal. 22 (4): 171–179. doi:10.1023/B:BTTJ.0000047596.75297.ee. S2CID 8717715. Archived from the original (PDF) on 2006-09-07.

== Awards ==
- Chevalier de l'Ordre des Arts et des Lettres, France (1995)
- DigiGlobe Prize in Interactive Media, Germany (1998)
- Telluride Tech Festival Award of Technology and the Ray Kurzweil Award of Technology in Music, USA (2003)
- Charles Steinmetz Prize from IEEE and Union College, "USA" (2007)
- Pulitzer Prize in Music Finalist for "Death and the Powers" (2012)
- Kennedy Center for the Performing Arts Award for Arts Advocacy (2013)
- 2016 Composer of the Year, Musical America
