= Adirondack Life =

New York magazine

- Editor: Annie Stoltie
- Categories: Regional magazine
- Frequency: Bimonthly
- Founded: 1969; 57 years ago
- Country: United States
- Based in: Jay, New York
- Language: English
- Website: www.adirondacklifemag.com

Adirondack Life is a bi-monthly magazine based in Jay, New York that covers the Adirondack region of the state. It has been published since 1969 when it began as a supplement to a Warrensburg, New York newspaper.

== Content ==
Articles are primarily oriented towards features on the history and culture of the region, as well as recreational opportunities. The magazine also runs an annual photography contest and publishes the winning entries both in the magazine itself and on its website. It also publishes and sells annual wall and engagement calendars.
