= Mezzo-soprano =

Type of classical female singing voice

Mezzo-soprano (Italian: [ˌmɛddzosoˈpraːno], lit. 'half soprano'), or mezzo (English: /ˈmɛtsoʊ/ MET-soh), is a type of classical female singing voice whose vocal range lies between the soprano and the contralto voice types. The term also serves to designate the singers specialized in or adept at this type. The mezzo-soprano's vocal range usually extends from the A below middle C to the A two octaves above (i.e. A_{3}–A_{5} in scientific pitch notation, where middle C = C_{4}; 220–880 Hz). In the lower and upper extremes, some mezzo-sopranos may extend down to the F below middle C (F_{3}, 175 Hz) and as high as "high C" (C_{6}, 1047 Hz). The mezzo-soprano voice type is generally divided into coloratura, lyric, and dramatic.

== History ==
While mezzo-sopranos typically sing secondary roles in operas, notable exceptions include the title role in Bizet's Carmen, Angelina (Cinderella) in Rossini's La Cenerentola, and Rosina in Rossini's Barber of Seville (all of which are also sung by sopranos and contraltos). Many 19th-century French-language operas give the leading female role to mezzos, including Béatrice et Bénédict, La damnation de Faust, Don Quichotte, La favorite, Dom Sébastien, Charles VI, Mignon, Samson et Dalila, Les Troyens, and Werther, as well as Carmen.

Typical roles for mezzo-sopranos include the stereotypical triad associated with contraltos of "witches, bitches, and britches": witches, nurses, and wise women, such as Azucena in Verdi's Il trovatore; villains and seductresses such as Amneris in Verdi's Aida; and "breeches roles" or "trouser roles" (male characters played by female singers) such as Cherubino in Mozart's Le nozze di Figaro. Mezzo-sopranos are well represented in baroque music, early music, and baroque opera. Some roles designated for lighter soubrette sopranos are sung by mezzo-sopranos, who often provide a fuller, more dramatic quality. Such roles include Despina in Mozart's Così fan tutte and Zerlina in his Don Giovanni. Mezzos sometimes play dramatic soprano roles such as Santuzza in Mascagni's Cavalleria rusticana, Lady Macbeth in Verdi's Macbeth, and Kundry in Wagner's Parsifal.

== Vocal range ==
Mezzo-soprano vocal range (A_{3}–A_{5}) notated on the treble staff and on piano keyboard in green with dot marking middle C (C_{4}).

The vocal range of the mezzo-sopranos lies between the soprano and the contralto voice types. Mezzo-sopranos generally have a heavier, darker tone than sopranos. The mezzo-soprano voice resonates in a higher range than that of a contralto. The terms Dugazon and Galli-Marié are sometimes used to refer to light mezzo-sopranos, after the names of famous singers. Usually men singing within the female range are called countertenors since there is a lighter more breathy tonal (falsetto) quality difference. In current operatic practice, female singers with very low tessituras are often included among mezzo-sopranos, because singers in both ranges are able to cover the other, and true operatic contraltos are very rare.

== Subtypes and roles in opera ==
Within the mezzo-soprano voice type category are three generally recognized subcategories: coloratura mezzo-soprano, lyric mezzo-soprano, and dramatic mezzo-soprano.

=== Coloratura ===
A coloratura mezzo-soprano has a warm lower register and an agile high register. The roles they sing often demand not only the use of the lower register but also leaps into the upper tessitura with highly ornamented, rapid passages. They have a range from approximately the G below middle C (G_{3}, 196 Hz) to the B two octaves above middle C (B_{5}, 988 Hz). Some coloratura mezzo-sopranos can sing up to high C (C_{6}, 1047 Hz) or high D (D_{6}, 1175 Hz), but this is very rare. What distinguishes these voices from being called sopranos is their extension into the lower register and warmer vocal quality. Although coloratura mezzo-sopranos have impressive and at times thrilling high notes, they are most comfortable singing in the middle of their range, rather than the top.

Many of the hero roles in the operas of Handel and Monteverdi, originally sung by male castrati, can be successfully sung today by coloratura mezzo-sopranos. Rossini demanded similar qualities for his comic heroines, and Vivaldi wrote roles frequently for this voice as well. Coloratura mezzo-sopranos also often sing lyric-mezzo-soprano roles or soubrette roles.

Coloratura mezzo-soprano roles in operas (*denotes a lead role):

- Angelina (Cenerentola), La Cenerentola (Rossini)*
- Ariodante, Ariodante (Handel)*
- Baba the Turk, The Rake's Progress (Stravinsky)
- Griselda, Griselda (Vivaldi)*
- Isabella, L'italiana in Algeri (Rossini)*
- Isolier, Le comte Ory (Rossini)*
- Julius Caesar, Giulio Cesare (Handel)*
- Orsini, Lucrezia Borgia (Donizetti)
- Romeo, I Capuleti e i Montecchi (Vincenzo Bellini)*
- Ruggiero, Alcina (Handel)*
- Rosina, The Barber of Seville (Rossini)*
- Serse, Serse (Handel)*
- Tancredi, Tancredi (Rossini)*

=== Lyric ===
The lyric mezzo-soprano has a range from approximately the G note below middle C (G_{3}, 196 Hz) to the A two octaves above middle C (A_{5}, 880 Hz). This voice has a very smooth, sensitive and at times lachrymose quality. Lyric mezzo-sopranos do not have the vocal agility of the coloratura mezzo-soprano or the size of the dramatic mezzo-soprano. The lyric mezzo-soprano is ideal for most trouser roles.

Lyric mezzo-soprano roles in operas (*denotes a lead role):

- Adalgisa, Norma (Bellini)
- Ariadne, The Minotaur (Birtwistle)
- Carmen, Carmen (Bizet)*
- Charlotte, Werther (Massenet)*
- The Composer, Ariadne auf Naxos (Richard Strauss)
- Dido, Dido and Aeneas (Purcell)*
- Floßhilde, Das Rheingold, Götterdämmerung (Richard Wagner)
- Hänsel, Hansel and Gretel (Humperdinck)*
- Jo, Little Women (Mark Adamo)
- Marguerite, La damnation de Faust (Berlioz)*
- Meg, Little Women (Mark Adamo)
- Mignon, Mignon (Ambroise Thomas)*
- Miranda, The Tempest (Thomas Adès)
- Mother, Amahl and the Night Visitors (Menotti)*
- Nancy, Albert Herring (Britten)
- Nicklausse, The Tales of Hoffmann (Offenbach)
- Octavian, Der Rosenkavalier (Richard Strauss)*
- Orlofsky, Die Fledermaus (Johann Strauss II)
- The Pilgrim, L'Amour de loin (Kaija Saariaho)*
- Puck, Oberon (Weber)
- Sesto, Giulio Cesare (Handel)
- Siebel, Faust (Gounod)
- Sorceress, Dido and Aeneas (Purcell)
- Stephano, Roméo et Juliette (Charles Gounod)
- Suzuki, Madama Butterfly (Puccini)
- Tisbe, La Cenerentola (Rossini)

=== Dramatic ===
A dramatic mezzo-soprano has a strong medium register, a warm high register and a voice that is broader and more powerful than the lyric and coloratura mezzo-sopranos. This voice has less vocal facility than the coloratura mezzo-soprano. The range of the dramatic mezzo-soprano is from approximately the F below middle C (F_{3}, 175 Hz) to the G two octaves above middle C (G_{5}, 784 Hz). The dramatic mezzo-soprano can sing over an orchestra and chorus with ease and was often used in the 19th century opera, to portray older women, mothers, witches and evil characters. Verdi wrote many roles for this voice in the Italian repertoire and there are also a few good roles in the French Literature. The majority of these roles, however, are within the German Romantic repertoire of composers like Wagner and Richard Strauss. Like coloratura mezzos, dramatic mezzos are also often cast in lyric mezzo-soprano roles.

Dramatic mezzo-soprano roles in operas (*denotes a lead role):

- Azucena, Il trovatore (Verdi)*
- Amneris, Aida (Verdi)*
- Adelaide, Arabella (Richard Strauss)
- Brangäne, Tristan und Isolde (Richard Wagner)
- The Countess, The Queen of Spades (Tchaikovsky)
- Dalila, Samson and Delilah (Saint-Saëns)*
- Dido, Les Troyens (Berlioz)*
- Dorabella, Così fan tutte (Mozart)
- Eboli, Don Carlos (Verdi)
- Fricka, Das Rheingold, Die Walküre (Wagner)
- Gertrud, Hansel and Gretel (Humperdinck)
- The Gingerbread Witch, Hansel and Gretel (Humperdinck)
- Herodias, Salome (Richard Strauss)
- Judith, Bluebeard's Castle (Bartók)*
- Klytämnestra, Elektra (Richard Strauss)
- Laura, La Gioconda (Ponchielli)
- Marina, Boris Godunov (Mussorgsky)
- Ortrud, Lohengrin (Wagner)
- Princess de Bouillon, Adriana Lecouvreur (Cilea)
- Venus, Tannhäuser (Wagner)
- Waltraute, Die Walküre, Götterdämmerung (Wagner)
- Zweite Dame (Second Lady), The Magic Flute (Mozart)
- Zweite Norn (Second Norn), Götterdämmerung (Wagner)

=== Gilbert and Sullivan and operetta ===
All of Gilbert and Sullivan's Savoy operas have at least one mezzo-soprano character. Notable operetta roles are:

- The Lady Angela, Patience (Gilbert and Sullivan)
- Cousin Hebe, H.M.S. Pinafore (Gilbert and Sullivan)
- Edith, The Pirates of Penzance (Gilbert and Sullivan)
- Iolanthe, Iolanthe (Gilbert and Sullivan)
- Mad Margaret, Ruddigore (Gilbert and Sullivan)
- Melissa, Princess Ida (Gilbert and Sullivan)
- Pitti-Sing, The Mikado (Gilbert and Sullivan)
- Phoebe Meryll, The Yeomen of the Guard (Gilbert and Sullivan)
- The Lady Saphir, Patience (Gilbert and Sullivan)
- Tessa, The Gondoliers (Gilbert and Sullivan)

== See also ==
- Category of mezzo-sopranos
- Fach, the German system for classifying voices
- Voice classification in non-classical music
- List of mezzo-sopranos in non-classical music
