= Mark Adamo =

American composer and librettist (born 1962)

Mark Adamo (born August 1, 1962) is an American composer, librettist, and professor of music composition at New York University's Steinhardt School of Culture, Education, and Human Development. He was born in Philadelphia.

== Early life and education ==
A native of Willingboro Township, New Jersey, Adamo attended Holy Cross High School in Delran Township, New Jersey. He attended New York University, where he received the Paulette Goddard Remarque Scholarship for outstanding undergraduate achievement in playwriting. He went on to earn a Bachelor of Music cum laude in composition in 1990 from The Catholic University of America in Washington, D.C., where he was awarded the Theodore Presser prize for outstanding undergraduate achievement in composition.

== Career ==
At New York City Opera, he curated the contemporary opera workshop series VOX: Showcasing American Composers. Adamo served as master artist at the Atlantic Center for the Arts in May 2003. He has directed productions of his Little Women in Cleveland and Milwaukee, both of which were cited as among the best classical-music events of the year by the Cleveland Plain Dealer and the Milwaukee Journal Sentinel, respectively; and he has annotated programs for Stagebill, the Freer Gallery of Art, and most recently for BMG Classics. His criticism and interviews have appeared in The Washington Post, Stagebill, Opera News, The Star-Ledger, and The New Grove Dictionary of Music and Musicians; the journal on his self-titled website was named among the Best Music Blogs by Arts Journal in January 2008.

While he has composed the symphonic cantata "Late Victorians, "Four Angels: Concerto for Harp and Orchestra," and six substantial choral works, the composer's principal work has been for the opera house: the composer and librettist of the highly regarded Little Women. He served as composer-in-residence for New York City Opera from 2001 to 2006, and the company gave the East Coast premiere of his new opera, Lysistrata, or The Nude Goddess, in March to April 2006. Lysistrata, hailed as "a sumptuous love story, poised between comedy and heartbreak" by Alex Ross of The New Yorker, was David Gockley's last commission for the Houston Grand Opera, which gave the world premiere on 4 March 2005. Since its 1998 premiere by Houston Grand Opera, "Little Women" has been heard in over sixty-five international engagements, including a telecast over the PBS series "Great Performances" in August 2001. The opera was given its Asian premiere in May 2005, when New York City Opera's production of the piece was chosen as the U.S. exhibit for the World Expo in Tokyo and Nagoya; State Opera of South Australia gave the Australian premiere at the Adelaide Festival in May 2007, the International Vocal Arts Institute gave the Israeli premiere in Tel Aviv in July 2008, and Calgary Opera has announced the Canadian premiere for January 2010.

In January 2009, San Francisco Opera announced that it had commissioned Adamo to compose both the score and libretto for an opera entitled The Gospel of Mary Magdalene, which, in the composers' words, "will draw on the Canonical Gospels, the Gnostic Gospels, and fifty years of scholarship to reimagine the New Testament through the eyes of its lone substantial female character." The company premiered the work on June 19, 2013, with Michael Christie conducting.

Adamo has lived with his husband, the composer John Corigliano, in New York City; the two were married in Santa Cruz, California by the conductor Marin Alsop during the 2008 Cabrillo Festival of Contemporary Music.

== Work ==
=== Opera ===
- Little Women (1998)
- Avow, a 10-minute chamber opera (1999)
- Lysistrata, or The Nude Goddess (2005)
- The Gospel of Mary Magdalene (2013)
- Becoming Santa Claus (2015)

=== Selected other works ===
- Late Victorians" for singer, speaker, and chamber orchestra (1994, rev. 2007: 25 minutes)
- Four Angels: Concerto for Harp and Orchestra (2006: 25 minutes)
- Alcott Music (from the opera Little Women, for strings and percussion) (1999, revised 2007;18 minutes)
- Regina Coeli, for harp and strings (2007; 8 minutes)
- "Overture to Lysistrata" for orchestra (2006: 4 minutes)
- Garland for SSAA choir and piano or piano and chamber ensemble (2006; 15 minutes)
- "Cantate Domino: Etude on Psalm 97" (Psalm 98) for double SATB choir and piano with soprano soloist (1999, rev. 2009: 12 minutes)
- Matewan Music: three folk songs for SATB choir a capella with soprano soloist (1995, rev. 2009; 13 minutes)
- The Poet Speaks of Praising for SATB or TTBB choir a capella (1995, rev. 2009: 6 minutes)
- "Supreme Virtue," for double SATB choir a capella (1997, rev. 2009: 6 minutes)
- "Pied Beauty" for SATB choir a capella (1995, rev. 2009; 4 minutes)
- "God's Grandeur," or SATB choir a capella (1995, rev. 2009; 4 minutes)
- The Racer's Widow, a cycle of five songs for mezzo-soprano, piano and cello (2009: 15 minutes)
