= List of North American opera companies =

This inclusive list of North American opera companies contains American and Canadian professional opera companies and opera related organizations with entries in the Wikipedia. For opera companies in Latin America (including Mexico) see List of Latin American and South American opera companies. For opera companies from other countries, see Lists of opera companies.

== Canada ==
=== Alberta ===
- Calgary Opera
- Edmonton Opera

=== British Columbia ===
- Opera Pro Cantanti, Vancouver
- Vancouver Opera
- City Opera of Vancouver
- Pacific Opera Victoria
- Vancouver Concert Opera Co-Operative (VanCOCO)
- Opera di Concertisti e Meraviglie, Vancouver

=== Manitoba ===
- Manitoba Opera, Winnipeg

=== Ontario ===
- Canadian Children's Opera Company
- Canadian Opera Company, Toronto
- Centuries Opera Association, Toronto
- Opera Atelier, Toronto
- Opera in Concert, Toronto
- Tapestry Opera, Toronto
- Toronto City Opera
- Against the Grain Theatre (AtG), Toronto

=== Quebec ===
- Opéra de Montréal
- Opéra de Québec
- Opéra du Royaume, Saguenay

=== Saskatchewan ===
- Saskatoon Opera

== United States ==
=== Alabama ===
- Mobile Opera
- Opera Birmingham
- Druid City Opera
- Opera Huntsville

=== Alaska ===
- Anchorage Opera
- Fairbanks Light Opera Theatre
- Juneau Lyric Opera Association
- Opera Fairbanks

=== Arizona ===
- Arizona Opera, Phoenix and Tucson
- Valley Opera
- Phoenix Opera

=== Arkansas ===
- Opera Fayetteville
- Opera in the Ozarks at Inspiration Point
- Opera in the Rock
- Ozark Family Opera Company
- Wildwood Park for the Performing Arts

=== California ===
- Ars Minerva
- Berkeley Chamber Opera
- California Opera Association
- Capitol Opera Sacramento
- Celestial Opera Company
- Cinnabar Opera Theater
- Center Stage Opera
- Festival Opera
- First Look Sonoma
- Gallo Center for the Arts
- Goat Hall Productions
- Golden Gate Opera
- Independent Opera Company, Los Angeles
- Lamplighters Music Theatre
- Livermore Valley Opera
- Long Beach Opera
- Los Angeles Civic Light Opera
- Los Angeles Metropolitan Opera
- Los Angeles Opera
- Lyric Opera of Los Angeles
- Lyric Opera San Diego
- Martinez Opera
- Merola Opera Program
- Music Academy of the West
- Musical Traditions
- North Bay Opera
- Oakland Opera Theater
- Opera a la Carte
- Opera Pacific (closed November 2008)
- Opera Pasadena
- Opera Parallèle, San Francisco
- Opera Royale
- Opera San José
- Opera San Luis Obispo
- Opera Santa Barbara
- Pacific Opera Project
- Pacific Repertory Opera
- Pocket Opera
- Repertory Opera Company
- Riverside Lyric Opera
- Sacramento Opera
- San Diego Opera
- San Francisco Lyric Opera
- San Francisco Opera
- Stockton Opera Association
- The Industry
- Townsend Opera Players
- Tyrolean Opera Program
- Verismo Opera
- Visalia Opera Company
- West Bay Opera Association
- West Edge Opera

=== Colorado ===
- Aspen Music Festival
- Boulder Opera Company
- Central City Opera
- Crested Butte Music Festival
- Empire Lyric Players
- Loveland Opera Theatre
- Opera Colorado
- Opera Fort Collins
- Opera Theatre of the Rockies
- Rocky Mountain Opera

=== Connecticut ===
- Connecticut Grand Opera and Orchestra
- Connecticut Lyric Opera
- Connecticut Opera (closed in Feb 2009)
- Hartford Opera Theater
- Hartford Wagner Festival
- Hillhouse Opera Company
- Opera Connecticut
- Opera Theater of Connecticut
- Salt Marsh Opera
- Yale Baroque Opera Project

=== Delaware ===
- Opera Delaware

=== District of Columbia ===
- Bel Cantanti Opera
- Maryland Lyric Opera
- Opera Camerata of Washington
- Opera Lafayette
- DC Public Opera
- Summer Opera Theatre Company
  (closed January 2010)
- Washington Concert Opera
- Washington National Opera
- Washington Savoyards

=== Florida ===
- Central Florida Lyric Opera
- Gulfshore Opera
- First Coast Opera (St Augustine)
- Florida Grand Opera
- Hispanic-American Lyric Theatre
- Miami Lyric Opera
- New Century Opera
- The Opera Atelier
- Opera del Sol
- Opera Jacksonville
- Opera Naples
- Opera Tampa
- Opera Theater of Lakeland
- Opera Orlando
- Orlando Opera
- Palm Beach Opera
- Pensacola Opera
- Sarasota Opera
- St. Petersburg Opera Company

=== Georgia ===
- The Atlanta Opera
- Americolor Opera Alliance
- Capitol City Opera
- Moon River Opera
- Peach State Opera
- See also Opera in Atlanta

=== Hawaii ===
- Hawaii Opera Theatre
- Hawaii Youth Opera Chorus

=== Idaho ===
- Idaho Falls Opera Theatre
- North Idaho Friends of the Opera and the Arts Inc.
- Opera Idaho

=== Illinois ===
- Bowen Park Opera Company
- Chicago Opera Theater
- da Corneto Opera
- DuPage Opera Theatre
- Haymarket Opera Company
- Light Opera Works
- Lyric Opera of Chicago
- Muddy River Opera Company
- Opera Illinois
- Great Lakes Operetta

=== Indiana ===
- Indianapolis Opera
- Indiana University Opera, Jacobs School of Music, Bloomington
- South Bend Lyric Opera

=== Iowa ===
- Cedar Rapids Opera Theatre
- Des Moines Metro Opera
- Opera Quad Cities

=== Kansas ===
- OperaKansas
- Wichita Grand Opera
- Lawrence Opera Theatre

=== Kentucky ===
- Kentucky Opera

=== Louisiana ===
- Jefferson Performing Arts Society
- New Orleans Opera
- Opera Louisiane
- Shreveport Opera

=== Maine ===
- Opera Maine, Portland (formally PORTopera)
- Opera in the Pines, Statewide

=== Maryland ===
- American Opera Theater
- Annapolis Opera
- Baltimore Opera Company (closed March 2009)
- Bel Cantanti Opera
- Baltimore Concert Opera
- Maryland Opera
- Opera International
- Victorian Lyric Opera

=== Massachusetts ===
- Acting Singers Project
- Berkshire Opera Company (closed 2009)
- Boston Lyric Opera
- Boston Metro Opera (closed 2015)
- Boston Early Music Festival
- Boston Opera Collaborative
- Cape Cod Opera
- Commonwealth Lyric Theater
- Commonwealth Opera
- Helios Early Opera
- Longwood Opera
- Lowell House Opera, the oldest still-performing opera company in New England
- MassOpera (formally MetroWest Opera)
- Odyssey Opera
- Opera Boston (closed 2011)
- Opera del West
- OperaHub
- Guerilla Opera

=== Michigan ===
- Detroit Opera
- Traverse City Opera
- Opera Grand Rapids
- Opera MODO

=== Minnesota ===
- Lyric Opera of the North (LOON Opera Company)
- Minnesota Concert Opera (closed 2017)
- Minnesota Opera
- Nautilus Music-Theater
- Skylark Opera Theatre
- Arbeit Opera Theatre
- Really Spicy Opera

=== Mississippi ===
- Mississippi Opera
- Natchez Festival of Music

=== Missouri ===
- Landlocked Opera
- Lyric Opera of Kansas City
- Opera Theatre of Saint Louis
- Springfield Regional Opera
- Heartland Opera Theatre
- Union Avenue Opera
- Winter Opera Saint Louis

=== Montana ===
- Montana Lyric Opera
- Rimrock Opera
- Opera Montana

=== Nebraska ===
- Opera Omaha
- Nebraska Opera Project

=== Nevada ===
- Nevada Opera
- Opera Las Vegas
- Vegas City Opera

=== New Hampshire ===
- Granite State Opera (closed April 2009)
- Opera New Hampshire
- Opera North
- Raylynmor Opera

=== New Jersey ===
- Boheme Opera New Jersey
- Eastern Opera of New Jersey
- Garden State Philharmonic
- Light Opera of New Jersey
- The Little Opera Company of New Jersey
- New Jersey Concert Opera
- New Jersey Opera Theater
- Opera Seabrook
- Opera Theatre of Montclair

=== New Mexico ===
- Opera Southwest, Albuquerque
- Santa Fe Opera

=== New York ===
- Amato Opera (closed 2009)
- American Lyric Theater
- American Opera Project
- American Savoyards (closed 1967)
- Amore Opera
- Apotheosis Opera
- Bare Opera
- Bronx Opera
- Brooklyn Academy of Music Opera
- Cantiamo Opera Theater
- Capitol Opera Albany-Saratoga
- Center for Contemporary Opera
- Chautauqua Opera
- Chelsea Opera
- Delaware Valley Opera Company
- Dicapo Opera (closed 2015)
- Empire Opera
- Encompass New Opera Theatre
- Finger Lakes Opera
- Family Opera Initiative
- The Gilbert and Sullivan Light Opera Company of Long Island
- Glimmerglass Festival
- Gotham Chamber Opera (closed 2015)
- Heartbeat Opera
- Hubbard Hall Opera Theater
- Hudson Lyric Opera
- Hudson Opera Theatre
- La Gran Scena Opera Company
- Opera Saratoga, formerly Lake George Opera
- Liederkranz Opera Theater
- Light Opera of Manhattan (closed 1992)
- Little Opera Theatre of New York
- Loft Opera
- Long Island Opera Company
- Mercury Opera Rochester (closed 2011; formed in 2005 with merger of Opera Rochester, Rochester Opera Factory, and Opera Theatre Guild)
- Metropolitan Opera, The
- Millennial Arts Productions
- New Camerata Opera
- New Opera Company
- New Rochelle Opera
- New York City Opera (closed October 2013, reopened January 2016)
- New York Gilbert and Sullivan Players
- New York Grand Opera Company
- New York Opera Forum
- New York Opera Project
- Nickel City Opera (NC Opera Buffalo)
- On Site Opera
- Opera Company of Brooklyn
- Opera Ebony
- Opera Manhattan
- Opera on Tap
- Opera Orchestra of New York
- Opera Saratoga
- Opera Theatre of Rochester (merged with Rochester Broadway Theatre League to form Opera Rochester in 1999)
- Oswego Opera Theatre
- PALA Opera Association
- Regina Opera Company
- Riverside Opera Ensemble
- Seagle Music Colony
- Syracuse Opera
- Taconic Opera
- Teatro Grattacielo
- Teatro Nuovo
- Tri-Cities Opera Company
- Vertical Player Repertory
- Vocal Productions NYC

=== North Carolina ===
- Asheville Lyric Opera
- North Carolina Opera
- Greensboro Opera Company
- Opera Carolina
- Opera Wilmington
- Piedmont Opera
- Capitol Opera Raleigh
- Durham Savoyards
- Janiec Opera Company at the Brevard Music Center
- The A. J. Fletcher Opera Institute at the University of North Carolina School of the Arts

=== North Dakota ===
- Fargo-Moorhead Opera

=== Ohio ===
- Cincinnati Opera
- Cincinnati Chamber Opera
- The Cleveland Opera
- Cleveland Opera Theater
- Dayton Opera
- Opera Columbus
- Opera Western Reserve
- North American New Opera Workshop (Cincinnati)
- Ohio Light Opera
- Toledo Opera

=== Oklahoma ===
- Light Opera Oklahoma closed 2013
- Tulsa Opera
- Cimarron Opera
- Painted Sky Opera

=== Oregon ===
- Opera Bend
- Brava! Opera, Medford
- Eugene Opera
- Portland Opera
- Rogue Opera, Medford

=== Pennsylvania ===
- Amici Opera
- Center City Opera Theater
- ConcertOPERA Philadelphia
- Microscopic Opera Company
- Opera Philadelphia (formerly Opera Company of Philadelphia)
- OperaLancaster
- Opera North (Philadelphia)
- Pittsburgh Festival Opera (formerly Opera Theater of Pittsburgh)
- Pittsburgh Opera
- Pittsburgh Savoyards
- Resonance Works Pittsburgh
- Savoy Company

=== Puerto Rico ===
- Opera de Puerto Rico

=== Rhode Island ===
- Opera Providence

=== South Carolina ===
- Greenville Light Opera Works (GLOW)
- Charleston Opera Theater
- Palmetto Opera
- Spoleto Festival USA
- South Carolina Opera Company

=== Tennessee ===
- Chattanooga Symphony and Opera
- Knoxville Opera
- Marble City Opera (Knoxville, Tennessee)
- Nashville Opera Association
- Opera Memphis
- Franklin Light Opera

=== Texas ===
- Abilene Opera Association
- Amarillo Opera
- Austin Opera
- Dallas Opera
- El Paso Opera
- Fort Worth Opera
- Houston Grand Opera
- Lone Star Lyric Theater Festival
- Lyric Opera of Waco
- Opera Arlington
- Opera East Texas
- Opera in the Heights
- Opera Vista
- Regal Opera
- Opera Piccola of San Antonio

=== Utah ===
- Lyrical Opera Theater
- Park City Opera
- St. George Opera
- Utah Festival Opera & Musical Theatre
- Utah Symphony and Opera

=== Vermont ===
- Green Mountain Opera Festival
- Opera Company of Middlebury
- Opera Theatre of Weston
- Vermont Opera Theater

=== Virginia ===
- Charlottesville Opera, previously known as Ash Lawn Opera
- Aurora Opera (formerly the Opera Theatre of Northern Virginia)
- Bay View Music Festival
- Capital City Opera
- Opera in Williamsburg
- Opera Music Theater International
- Opera on the James
- Opera Roanoke
- River City Opera

Shakespeare Opera Theatre

- Virginia Opera
- Wolf Trap Opera Company
- Castleton Festival

=== Washington ===
- Bellevue Opera
- Black Box Opera Theater
- Lyric Opera Northwest]
- Puget Sound Concert Opera
- Puget Sound Opera
- Seattle Opera
- Skagit Opera
- Spokane Coeur d'Alene Opera
- Tacoma Opera
- Vashon Opera
- Vespertine Opera
- Washington East Opera

=== Wisconsin ===
- Florentine Opera
- Madison Opera
- Fresco Opera Theatre
- Milwaukee Opera Theatre
- Opera for the Young
- Skylight Opera Theatre

=== Wyoming ===
- Opera Wyoming
