= Audrey Babcock =

American mezzo-soprano opera singer

- Born: September 20, 1979; Los Angeles, California
- Occupation: Opera singer
- Website: https://www.audreybabcock.com/

Audrey Babcock (born September 20, 1979) is an American mezzo-soprano and voice teacher. A native of California, she has had an active international career in operas and concerts since 2000. She is closely associated with the title role in Georges Bizet's Carmen and the part of Maddalena in Giuseppe Verdi's Rigoletto; parts she has sung with many opera companies. A former voice teacher at the University of North Carolina at Charlotte, she currently teaches on the music faculties of the California Institute of the Arts and California State University.

== Early life and education ==
The daughter of John Ross Babcock and Sandra H. Sternig-Babcock, Aubrey Jessica Babcok was born in Los Angeles, California on September 20, 1979. Her mother worked as an educator with special needs children. Her father was a Peabody Award and Emmy Award winning journalist who died in 1997 when she was 18 years old.

Babcock grew up near Culver City, California, and attended Hamilton High School. She first learned to play the flute in her elementary school's orchestra program. She also learned how to play the piano, guitar, and ukulele. She graduated with a BM in Voice from the Peabody Conservatory (PC) and an MFA in VoiceArts with concentrations in Producing and Dramaturgy from the California Institute of the Arts. She portrayed Baba the Turk in the PC's 1999 student production of The Rake's Progress. In 2001 she was the recipient of the Samuel C. Endicott Fund Award after placing fourth in the Palm Beach Opera vocal competition. She was a regional finalist multiple times in the Metropolitan Opera National Council Auditions.

== Performance career ==
In December 2000 Babcock was a soloist with the Kennett Symphony in their concert of holiday music entitled "Jubilate" Early in her career she was a member of the young artist programs at the Opera North (2001), Santa Fe Opera (2002), Florida Grand Opera (2002), Seattle Opera, and Opera Theatre of Lucca. With Opera North she made her professional opera debut as Mercedes in Georges Bizet's Carmen in 2001; a role she repeated at the Mobile Opera in 2002 with Cynthia Jansen in the title role. In the summer of 2003 she appeared at the Wolf Trap Opera (WTO) as Berta in The Barber of Seville (with Sarah Coburn as Rosina) and as the First Dream in Rameau's Dardanus. Roles she performed with the Florida Grand Opera included the title role in a truncated version of Carmen (2002), Lola in Cavalleria rusticana (2002), and Fyodor in Boris Godunov (2002).

In 2004 Babcock was a soloist in a concert of music by J. S. Bach and C. P. E. Bach with the Southwest Florida Chamber Symphony. That same year she performed the role of Suzuki in Madama Butterfly with the Mobile Opera, and appeared as both Rigo in Francesco Bartolomeo Conti's Don Chisciotte in Sierra Morena and Armelinde in Pauline Viardot's Cendrillon at the Caramoor Summer Music Festival. In 2005 she returned to Mobile Opera to perform in a concert of excerpts from operas by Giuseppe Verdi, and performed as a soloist with the Richmond Choral Society. In 2006 she returned to the Florida Grand Opera as Maddalena in Verdi's Rigoletto (2006); a role she later repeated at the Toledo Opera (2006) Opera Carolina (2009), Florentine Opera (2010), Virginia Opera (2010), Nashville Opera (2010), Tulsa Opera (2010), Opera Saratoga (2012), Opera Coeur d'Alene (2013), Opera Omaha (2014), Boston Lyric Opera (2014), and Palm Beach Opera (2017).

In 2007 Babcock performed the title roles in Tobias Picker's Thérèse Raquin with the Dicapo Opera Theatre (alternating with Beverly O’Regan Thiele), and Carmen at the Toledo Opera. Carmen has remained a frequently performed role in Babcock's repertoire, and by 2025 she had given more than 250 performances of that role in opera houses internationally.She performed the role for her European debut in 2010 at the Savonlinna Opera Festival. Some of the organizations with whom she has appeared as Carmen include San Antonio Opera (2008), the Utah Festival Opera (2009 & 2022), Wichita Grand Opera (2010), Nashville Opera (2011), Florentine Opera (2012), the Lyrique-en-Mer Festival in Paris, France (2013), Toledo Opera (2014), Pensacola Opera (2014), the Norwalk Symphony Orchestra (2014), Opera Delaware (2015), Anchorage Opera (2015 & 2023), Knoxville Opera (2015), Fort Worth Opera (2017), Dayton Opera (2017), Mill City Summer Opera (2018), the Bar Harbor Music Festival in Maine (2019), Charlottesville Opera (2025), and the Sioux City Symphony Orchestra (2025). She was the stage director for Opera Memphis's 2025 production of Carmen in which she also starred.

In 2008 Babcock portrayed the Second Lady in Mozart's The Magic Flute with Opera Pacific, and Flora in La traviata at the Cincinnati Opera. In 2009 she appeared as Dorabella in Così fan tutte with Opera Idaho, Jo March in Little Women with Syracuse Opera, Aldonza in Man of La Mancha with Shreveport Opera, and Lola in Cavalleria rusticana with Utah Festival Opera (UFO). She repeated the role of Jo March at the UFO in 2011, and that same year reprised the part of the Second Lady at Spoleto Festival USA. In the summer of 2011 she portrayed the Secretary of the Consulate in The Consul with the New Jersey State Opera; a role she later repeated in 2017 at the Chicago Opera Theatre and Long Beach Opera.

In 2012 Bacock portrayed Erika in Samuel Barber's Vanessa with Sarasota Opera and repeated the role of Suzuki with Tulsa Opera. In 2013 she performed Mercedes in Carmen at the Dallas Opera. She created the role of Maria Louisa in the world premiere of Daniel Crozier's With Blood, With Ink at the Fort Worth Opera in 2014. She returned to Dallas in 2016 as Rosette in Jules Massenet's Manon. That same year she portrayed Donna Elvira in Don Giovanni at the New Orleans Opera, and performed the part of Regina in Jorge Sosa's La Reina at the Prototype Festival in New York City. In 2017 she returned to Opera Saratoga as Mrs. Mister in Marc Blitzstein's The Cradle Will Rock; a production which resulted in a recording of the opera.

In 2018 Babcock starred in Astor Piazzolla's María de Buenos Aires at the San Diego Opera. In 2019 she portrayed Elizabeth Proctor in Robert Ward's The Crucible with Opera Santa Barbara, and appeared in Beyond Carmen with Opera Delaware. In 2020 she performed in Daniel Schnyder's Charlie Parker's Yardbird with the Seattle Opera. In 2021 she was a soloist with Santa Monica’s Verdi Chorus. In 2022 she starred in Zach Redler's The Falling and The Rising at the Arizona Opera, and appeared as a soloist in Verdi's Requiem with the Reading Symphony Orchestra. In 2023 she returned to the UFO as Amneris in Verdi's Aida and Mrs. Gibbs in Ned Rorem's Our Town. That same year she starred in Jack Perla's An American Dream at Opera Santa Barbara. In 2024 she appeared with Utah Opera as Mrs. Lovett in Sweeney Todd: The Demon Barber of Fleet Street, and as Flora in La Traviata with Opera Omaha. In 2025 she performed the role of Santuzza in Cavalleria rusticana with Opera Orlando. She returned to the Anchorage Opera in 2026 as Amneris in Aida.

== Educator ==
Babcock is a former faculty member University of North Carolina at Charlotte where she was an Associate Professor of Voice in the Department of Music. She currently teaches on the voice faculties of California Institute of the Arts and California State University (CSU); also serving as a member of the musical theatre faculty at CSU.

== Albums ==
Babcock, recording under the name Aviva, released an album called Songs for Carmen in 2007. The album is a collection of Ladino pieces sung in the Judo-Spanish language Lindo and Arabic and was inspired by the character Carmen.
