= Oscar Ravina =

Polish violinist (1930–2010)

Oscar Ravina (April 27, 1930 – February 25, 2010) was a Polish-born American violinist, violin teacher and concertmaster, who had a prolific career as a performer as well as being a professor emeritus at Montclair State University, where a talent grant in his name is regularly given to outstanding full-time freshmen studying string instruments.

== Early career ==
Ravina began his musical career in Poland, and continued his studies at the Saint Petersburg Conservatory in Leningrad; the Anton Bruckner Private University for Music, Drama, and Dance in Linz, Austria; the Mozarteum in Salzburg; and the Vienna State Academy in Vienna. It was Isaac Stern who urged him to move to the United States, where he continued his studies with Nicoline Zedeler Mix, Louis Persinger, and at the Manhattan School of Music.

== Career ==
A one-time concertmaster of the Philharmonia Virtuosi of New York, a chamber orchestra consisting of leading New York Philharmonic musicians, which he helped to organize, Oscar Ravina was for many years a member of the New York Philharmonic and an active member of the New York Philharmonic Ensembles. As founder of the Ravina String Quartet, he concertized and recorded in both the United States and Canada and developed special programs for young audiences. From 1976, he was concertmaster of the Masterwork Orchestra, Masterwork Chamber Orchestra, and St. Cecilia Orchestra. He also taught chamber music at Dartmouth College and the Waterloo Music Festival, and performed under many major conductors. His solo performances included concerts with the National Orchestral Association of New York, Brooklyn Philharmonia, Westchester Philharmonic, Symphony of the Air, New Philharmonia of New York, and Philharmonia Virtuosi. For more than eleven seasons, he was music director and conductor of the Montclair Chamber Ensemble.

== Recordings ==
In a career spanning more than four decades, Ravina recorded solo and chamber music for many record labels, including: Orion, Orion I, RCA Victor, Columbia, Vox, Serenus, Nonesuch, CBS, Spectrum, Crystal Records, New World Records, Sony, and Centaur Records.

== Partial discography ==
- Basically Bach: Sony (2004), with: E. Power Biggs (organ), Glenn Gould (piano), Hilary Hahn (violin), Ronald Roseman (oboe), William Bennett (flute), Yo-Yo Ma (cello)
- John Adams: On the Transmigration of Souls (2004)
- Goin' for Baroque: Sony (1995) Neil Black (oboe), Philharmonia Virtuosi of New York, William Bennett (flute)
- The Baroque Era: The Life, Times & Music Series, 1600–1750 (1992) Musici di San Marco, Neil Black (oboe), Philharmonia Virtuosi of New York, William Bennett (flute)
- Mozart: Serenades Nos. 4–7 & 9: Vox Classical (1992) Dieter Vorholz (violin), Gerard Schwarz (posthorn), Philharmonia Virtuosi of New York, Mainz Chamber Orchestra
- Ellen Taaffe Zwilich: Symbolon; Concerto Grosso; Double Quartet; Trumpet Concerto – New World Records (1989) Christopher Lamb (percussion), Daniel Reed (violin), Hae-Young Ham (violin), Harriet Wingreen (piano), Judith Nelson (viola), Kerry McDermot (violin), Mindy Kaufman (flute), Mindy Kaufman (piccolo), Nancy Donaruma (cello)
- Mozart Serenades. Philharmonia Virtuosi of New York, Richard Kapp, Conductor. Vox 3 Lp box, SVBX 5107 (1979)
- Greatest Hits Of 1720: CBS (1977) Gerard Schwarz (trumpet), Judith Norell (soprano), Matitahu Braun (violin), Philharmonia Virtuosi of New York, Ronald Roseman (oboe), Richard Kapp (conductor)

== Notable performances ==
- Montclair State College Orchestra: Oscar Ravina, conductor; Eric Schaberg, violinist (concerto competition winner). Max Bruch's Violin Concerto No. 1 in G minor.
- Weill Recital Hall 1997, 1999, 2002

== Teaching legacy ==
Ravina taught hundreds of students over many decades. Some of the groups that they have gone on to play with include:

- Montclair Chamber Players, Arkansas Symphony Orchestra, New Sussex Symphony, Grand Rapids Symphony, St. Cecila Chorus and Orchestra, N.J. Pops, Syracuse Symphony Orchestra, Harrisburg Symphony Orchestra, Munich Symphony Orchestra, New Jersey Symphony Orchestra, Montclair Chamber Ensemble, Chelsea Opera, Orchestra-of-the-Bronx, Garden State Philharmonic, Staten Island Symphony, Harlem Festival Orchestra, Roanoke Symphony Orchestra, Greater Newburgh Symphony Orchestra, Key West Symphony and the Hudson Valley Philharmonic., Boston Ballet Orchestra, The Boston Symphony, The Royal Concertgebouw Orchestra
