= Mela Tenenbaum =

Ukrainian musician

- Mela Tenenbaum, in the 1980s
- Born: Chernovtsy, Ukraine
- Died: October 15, 2023; New York City, US
- Education: Kyiv Conservatory
- Occupations: Classical violinist; Classical viola player
- Organizations: Kyiv Chamber Orchestra; Kyiv Philharmonic; Philharmonia Virtuosi

Mela Tenenbaum (Note: Ukrainian: Міла Тененбаум, romanized: Mila Tenenbaum) was a classical violinist and violist, also playing viola d'amore. She performed with the Kyiv Philharmonic and other orchestras. She inspired composers such as Dmitri Klebanov to write pieces for her. She emigrated to the United States and was from the early 1990s concertmaster of the Philharmonia Virtuosi. She recorded works from Vivaldi to salon music, especially chamber music.

== Career ==
Born in Chernovtsy, Ukraine, Tenenbaum studied music at the Kyiv Conservatory and obtained a master's degree. She performed with the Kyiv Chamber Orchestra and the Kyiv Philharmonic from 1979. She was also a soloist and concertmaster with the chamber orchestra Perpetuum Mobile, an ensemble supported by the Ukrainian Union of Composers. Several Russian and Ukrainian composers wrote works for her which she premiered. Dmitri Klebanov composed for her pieces such as a viola concerto and Japanese Silhouettes for soprano, viola d'amore and a mixed ensemble of thirteen players.

In 1990, she emigrated to the United States. She was the concertmaster of the chamber orchestra Philharmonia Virtuosi, founded and conducted by Richard Kapp, from 1993. (Other sources give 1989 as the time of immigration and 1991 as year of appointment.) From 1992, she was the concertmaster for choral concerts of the community chorus The Master Singers of Westchester in the Bedford Presbyterian Church, Bach's Mass in B minor in 2003 and Mozart's Great Mass in C minor in 2007. She was on the faculty of the Killington Music Festival, and lectured at the Metropolitan Museum of Art and the Smithsonian Institution.

Tenenbaum died in New York City on 15 October 2023.

== Recording ==
Tenenbaum recorded among others Bach's sonatas and partitas, Locatelli's Art of the Violin, Mozart's violin concertos, and Beethoven's Violin Concerto. She recorded Vivaldi's concerto for four violins in B-flat, RV 553, with her husband Alexander playing 2nd violin. She recorded a viola recital, again with Kapp, of transcriptions and original pieces, Chausson's Pièce pour alto et piano, Op. 39, and Henri Vieuxtemps' Caprice from Hommage à Paganini, Op. 9. A reviewer described her playing of two Hungarian Dances "spontaneous and uninhibited, dramatic with an exciting touch of recklessness". The collection The Paganini's at Home combines chamber music by Paganini, for viola with violin, cello and guitar, played by her husband, Dorothy Lawson and Paul Bernard.

In 1997, she recorded Klebanov's viola concerto and Japanese Silhouettes, a "unique combination of song cycle and viola d'amore concerto", with soprano Natalia Biorro and Kapp conducting the Philharmonia Virtuosi. A reviewer from the American Viola Society noted:

The Viola Concerto is a major work of approximately thirty-two minutes; as played by violist Mela Tenenbaum, it has all the ingredients of a major triumph. I knew that Mrs. Tenenbaum was concertmaster of the Philharmonia Virtuosi, but there is no lessening of her wonderful violin skills when she switches to the viola. As a matter of fact, as I listened, I thought that the viola was her main instrument, not the violin. Her vibrato is warm and even, her technique superb, and her musicianship beyond criticism.

Tenenbaum is known for also playing salon repertory, such as works for violin and piano recorded as Songs Without Words with pianist Kapp, by composers such as Fritz Kreisler and Henryk Wieniawski. A reviewer compared her to Jascha Heifetz and noted:

While Mela Tenenbaum has a bright, steely tone, and an incisive rhythmic sense, there's nothing mechanical or motoristic about these readings. Her tone is under control, and her left hand is alert to possibilities of expressive fingerings and the subtle portamenti that are so vital in this repertoire.

In 1995, she recorded music she played on the Queen Elizabeth 2 with pianist Anton Nel, titled "Tea Time on the QE2".
