= Michael Ching =

American composer, conductor, and music administrator

Michael Ching (born September 29, 1958) is an American composer, conductor, and music administrator. A prolific and eclectic composer, he is best known nationally as the composer of innovative operas, including his a cappella adaptation of Shakespeare's A Midsummer Night's Dream (2011). His other major operas include Buoso's Ghost (1996), Corps of Discovery (2003), Slaying the Dragon (2012), Speed Dating Tonight! (2013), Alice Ryley (2015), and Notes on Viardot (2024). According to Opera America, he is one of the top 10 most-produced living North American opera or music-theater composers. He has written the librettos of many of his own operas, and has done so for nearly all of his operas composed after 2012.

He is on the board of directors of the National Opera Association.

== Early life and education ==
Michael Ching was born in 1958 in Honolulu, Hawaii. Before he was one year old his family left Honolulu, and he grew up in New Orleans and Saint Paul, Minnesota. His father was an accomplished amateur pianist and a college professor in theater and speech. Ching later recalled, "He played everything from Chopin to Dave Brubeck transcriptions. He wanted to go into music but his family discouraged him."

Ching started piano at the age of six and was quite skilled at it, at one point considering a career as a concert pianist. In addition, he studied flute, violin, and oboe, mostly for the sake of composition. He started composing as a child, and by the time he reached high school he had studied composition at Interlochen and also had private composition instruction.

He attended Duke University on a composition scholarship, studying with Robert Ward and Iain Hamilton. He graduated in 1980, and his senior project was a one-act opera retelling a vampire story set in New Orleans, which received a small performance at Duke.

== Career ==
Ching began his career as a National Opera Institute apprentice 1980–1981 at the Houston Grand Opera Studio, where he was involved in the company's productions and continued his composition studies with composer Carlisle Floyd. From 1981 to 1985 he held increasingly responsible positions at the Greater Miami Opera/Florida Grand Opera. He subsequently held conductor and executive director positions at venues including Texas Opera Theatre, Chautauqua Opera, and Triangle Music Theater.

In 1989 he was appointed Assistant to the General Director of Virginia Opera. He was subsequently the company's Associate Artistic Director from 1991 through mid 1992.

In 1992 Ching joined Opera Memphis as Artistic Director, a position he held through 2010. He was the opera's General Director for most of those years as well.

He left Opera Memphis for Iowa in the spring of 2010 when his wife Barbara, a university professor and a native Iowan, was named chair of the English department at Iowa State University. He told the Memphis Daily News, "Barbara and I always had a plan that I would be able to stay home and write and she would be the one carrying the economic ball. The time was right and the job came through."

In addition to being a freelance composer and conductor, Ching is also Chairman of the Douglas Moore Fund for American Opera, which supports emerging opera creators. He was Music Director of Nickel City Opera in Buffalo, New York, from 2012 to 2017, and Music Director of Amarillo Opera in Amarillo, Texas, from September 2016 to September 2020.

In 2019 he was elected to the board of directors of the National Opera Association.

== Major compositions ==
Ching's Piano Concerto, commissioned by the San Jose Chamber Orchestra, had its well-received premiere, performed by Craig Bohmler, in 1997. The San Jose Mercury wrote, "The concerto has the kind of instant appeal to listeners that every composer must dream of.... When it was finished, the crowd rose in a spontaneous ovation." The concerto was recorded and released on the orchestra’s first commercial CD.

The San Jose Chamber Orchestra subsequently also commissioned and premiered his Psyche and Eros, a 45-minute composition for narrator and string orchestra, written in collaboration with storyteller Margaret Wolfson, in 2000. Dan Leeson in San Francisco Classical Voice wrote that "The Ching/Wolfson collaboration is simply marvelous.... Ching is a gifted composer capable of turning out well-crafted music, very romantic when the occasion dictates and frightening when that is called for." Metro Silicon Valley analysed the music in great depth, concluding that "[T]he technique is adroit, fluid and winningly integrated. Ching speaks music so well that he accommodates the text without a stumble.... [T]he music stands remarkably well on its own – rather like a string of pearls.... Ching might well be tempted to craft a concert suite without the transitional material." The work's additional venues have included the Abu Dhabi Music & Art Festival and the Lincoln Center Summer Institute program in West Memphis.

=== Operas ===
==== 1985–1999 ====
Ching is best known for his operas. He provided his own libretti for his first two operas: Levees (1980), a New Orleans vampire story performed at Duke University; and Cocks Must Crow (1985), based on a Marjorie Kinnan Rawlings short story and performed at Greater Miami Opera. His early miniature opera Leo: Opera in One Cat is a jazz-based 15-minute one-act opera about a man fighting with his cat, with a libretto by Fernando Fonseca based on Cal Massey's story "Leo Spat". It premiered in June 1985 at Houston Grand Opera's Texas Opera Theater, and subsequent venues included South Street Theater in New York City in October 1985. Texas Monthly called it "a pleasant diversion but such an assured one that the Miami-based composer's talent glitters all over it."

His fourth opera, Cue 67, a one-act 35-minute contemporary murder-mystery ghost story set in a theater, was commissioned and premiered at Virginia Opera in 1992, paired in a double bill with Gian Carlo Menotti's The Medium. It contains an eclectic blend of musical styles from opera to rock 'n' roll, pop music, and Broadway-type tunes, and the libretto is by Sandra Bernhard.

Beginning in 1993, Ching wrote two related one-act operas with songwriter Hugh Moffatt. The first, King of the Clouds (1993), deals with alcoholism and broken families, and the second, Out of the Rain (1998), explores contemporary topics such as social pressure, teen suicide, and AIDS. King of the Clouds was commissioned and premiered by Dayton Opera, and Out of the Rain was commissioned jointly by Opera Delaware, the Kansas City Lyric Opera, and Opera Memphis, and premiered by Opera Delaware. Both operas, separately and together, have received numerous productions, including high-school productions.

Ching's opera Buoso's Ghost is a comedic sequel to Puccini's one-act comic opera Gianni Schicchi. It had its first full staging with the Pittsburgh Opera in 1996, and its official premiere at Opera Memphis in 1997. Starting where Gianni Schicchi ends, the new opera, with a libretto by the composer, opens with Schicchi's final chords and carries the plot forward by following the sinister dealings of Buoso Donati's family, who apparently had poisoned Buoso, and the continued machinations of Schicchi, who tries to exploit this growing suspicion on his part. In reviewing the work the Chicago Sun-Times wrote that "Buoso's Ghost soared .... [it] offered highly charged acting atop a deft, tuneful score.... Ching, General/Artistic Director of Opera Memphis, studied with Robert Ward and Carlisle Floyd, and the unashamed flow of natural, singing melody ... reflects the profile of his teachers." And the Chicago Tribune reported that "Composer and librettist Ching ... borrows snatches of Puccini tunes and weaves them into his own conservative-eclectic idiom, tossing in bits of American pop ... for merry measure. The vocal writing is expert, the orchestration light enough to allow the singers to project the text clearly. Buoso is charming and unpretentious ...." Opera News noted that Ching uses "a more modern musical mode, yet avoiding excessive atonality. The score subtly introduces brief tongue-in-cheek quotations from other works, ranging from Mozart to Sondheim, plus one unmistakable interjection of Shostakovich." The work has been performed throughout the U.S. as an ideal pairing with Gianni Schicchi, the most popular of Puccini's three Il trittico one-act operas.

Ching also supplied his own libretto to his one-act opera Faith, based on the short story of the same title by award-winning science-fiction author James Patrick Kelly. The opera follows the story of the titular character, a divorced and depressed woman who meets a man via a personal ad, discovers he talks to plants, and begins to fall in love again. Kelly said of the opera, "You get good reviews, you win an award, but there's no feeling quite so wonderful as having another artist interpret your work supremely well. There are giant chunks of narrative [Ching] just set to music which is different ... for opera ... much more colloquial and approachable. This man transformed my piece into something equally, if not more, wonderful." The opera was commissioned by OperaFest of New Hampshire, and premiered there in April 1999, with subsequent performances in September 1999 at the Vital Theatre in New York City and elsewhere, including Chicago in 2000.

==== 2000–2012 ====
Ching's three-act opera Corps of Discovery, his third collaboration with Hugh Moffatt, was commissioned by the University of Missouri for the bicentennial of the Lewis and Clark Expedition. The principal roles are Lewis; Clark; Sacagawea; interpreter Toussaint Charbonneau; York, a slave and full member of the corps; George Shannon; and John Potts, a German-born older member of the corps. Act 1 of the opera was performed in 2002 at Weill Recital Hall in Carnegie Hall and at the Kennedy Center for the Performing Arts. The full work had its world premiere in May 2003. In addition to full productions at the University of Missouri, Opera Memphis, Opera America's 2003 convention, Washington State University, University of Idaho, and elsewhere, Ching also toured the piece with Fargo-Moorhead Opera, using a piano and violin as accompaniment, throughout North Dakota, including some of the locations the expedition stopped at. Memphis's Tri-State Defender deemed the work an "epic success"; its review of the "enthusiastically received" work noted that "The years of preparation, study, writing, composing, editing and creating that were required to produce this panoramic and worthy opera is mind-boggling." The review found the score "monumental", "masterful", "magnificent and often haunting".

His next opera, an adaptation of Shakespeare's A Midsummer Night's Dream, is an entirely a cappella work, with the musical accompaniment, including the percussion, sung by a "voicestra" of 15 to 20 voices. The inspiration for the work came when he was invited to become the vocal coach for DeltaCappella, a contemporary a cappella group founded in Memphis in 2007. Ching retrospectively noted, "Their devotion to detail and their joy of singing was palpable and infectious. There was something jaw-droppingly giddy about the whole enterprise. With no reeds, no mouthpieces, no strings, no sticks, the variety of sounds they were capable of making was virtually unlimited. By the end of my first rehearsal with them I was hooked and eager to apply this new sonic palette to opera." After conducting Marcus Hummon's Shakespeare-filled Surrender Road, he reflected that "with its potential for three sonic worlds inhabited by the Athenians, the fairies, the rude mechanicals, A Midsummer Night’s Dream seemed a perfect vehicle for exploring a colorful prism of a cappella styles." Ching has noted that his eclectic compositional style was influenced by what Gershwin was trying to accomplish in Porgy and Bess: "He was writing something that surfs between pop and opera. Many people love Porgy, but nobody ever tries to write an opera like it. I wanted to write accessible and tuneful music, yet very modern." The opera debuted in 2011 at Playhouse on the Square, in collaboration with Opera Memphis, with roles sung by musical-theater singers and professional opera singers. It was also performed at OperaHub in Boston in 2012.

The Wall Street Journal praised A Midsummer Night's Dream, stating that "Ching's remarkably inventive opera is a celebration of what voices can do and still, with the exception of a few startling vocal percussion effects, sound like voices." The review noted Ching's "seamless changes in tone, ... fine sense of pacing and skill with ensemble writing" and "tonal and tuneful vocal lines ... written for maximum intelligibility". The reviewer found the voicestra's part remarkable in that it "supports the singers on the stage, its overlapping lines and syllables weaving around them, amplifying their characters and conflicts, sometimes echoing their words (or even their thoughts), or supplying atmosphere. The voicestra gives the opera an added human dimension ...."

Albany Records released the CD of A Midsummer Night's Dream — opera a cappella in 2014. The Recorded A Cappella Review Board reviewed the work, noting that

The opera is a fusion of Shakespeare text, a cappella background music, and different soloist styles based on the characters. For example, the characters of highest rank, such as Oberon and Titania, sing with a classical registration, while some of the more subordinate characters, such as Hermia, Helena, and Puck, generally sing in a more conversational style akin to musical theatre. To round out the group, the Rude Mechanicals were sung by members of the voicestra in a more contemporary pop style. These compositional choices create a spectrum that corresponds rank with singing style.

The opera features a healthy mix of catchy motives attributed to particular characters as well as quotations from other works, mostly operas, to serve as music for the play-within-a-play in Act 5 of the original. Almost every word in the opera is sung, though there are some passages that Mr. Ching opted to have spoken, as they served as minor plot advancements and did not require music to carry out their purpose. As is commonplace in modern opera, there are numerous time and texture changes throughout, as well as a spectrum of speech-like and song-like passages rather than black-and-white designations. The work is immensely tonal, which is a help to the voicestra.

Slaying the Dragon, Ching's fact-based 2012 opera, explores intolerance and redemption, and was inspired by the 1990s true story Not by the Sword by Kathryn Watterson. The two-act opera's libretto is by Ellen Frankel, and it was premiered in June 2012 by Philadelphia's Center City Opera Theater, which commissioned the work. The opera is the story of a Ku Klux Klan Grand Dragon whose life is transformed by the friendship and kindness of a local rabbi and his wife. The man renounces his Klan association and begins to speak out publicly for tolerance; his terminal illness eventually incapacitates him and he moves into the rabbi's home, converting to Judaism before dying. The score balances the dark themes of bigotry and intolerance with an eclectic variety of ethnic music including Yiddish folk songs, Vietnamese children’s songs, Jewish sacred music, Aryan rock, Broadway scores, gospel music, and country-western tunes.

==== 2013–2023 ====
Speed Dating Tonight!, a comic opera in one act, was commissioned and premiered in 2013 by the Janiec Opera of the Brevard Music Center. Ching supplied his own libretto for the piece, and the opera for up to 45 singers or more can be adapted for varying numbers of singers, voice types, gender ratios, and length of time, by cutting, re-ordering, or transposing the keys of the vignettes. Additional 2013–2014 production venues included Amarillo Opera, Southern Utah University, Ithaca College, University of Central Florida, Microscopic Opera (Pittsburgh), Poor Richard's Opera (Philadelphia), and elsewhere, and it has been cited as "the most-performed American opera within a year of its premiere".

Ching next composed and wrote the libretto for the opera Alice Ryley, a fact-based ghost story based on the title character (also spelled Alice Riley), a woman who was hanged in Savannah, Georgia, in the 1730s. The opera was commissioned by the Sherrill Milnes VOICE Programs, via the Savannah VOICE Festival, in October 2014, and premiered on Halloween Eve, October 30, 2015. In 2017 he premiered Anna Hunter, the Spirit of Savannah, another opera commissioned by the Savannah VOICE Festival. It is a one-act opera about historic preservation in 1950s' Savannah, and Ching wrote his own libretto. While he was composer-in-residence for Savannah VOICE Festival, Ching was also commissioned for a third opera, Birthday Clown, a short comic opera paired with I Pagliacci which premiered August 2019.

For Palm Springs Opera Guild of the Desert, in Palm Springs, California, Ching wrote Thriver, also known as Thrivers, a one-act opera specifically for adolescent voices about overcoming teen depression. It premiered in January 2019. Cedar Rapids Opera Theatre, in Cedar Rapids, Iowa, commissioned his opera Seven Woods and a Van, which alludes to the 15th-century Flemish artist Jan van Eyck's influence on 20th-century American Gothic painter Grant Wood. It was one of three 30-minute operas about Grant Wood commissioned by Cedar Rapids Opera, presented in April 2019. In June 2019, his Utah Opera–commissioned short opera Completing the Picture premiered, with a libretto by Victoria Bourns which references the fact that none of the 20,000 Chinese workers who built the western portion of the Transcontinental Railroad were in the famous 1869 photograph of the Golden Spike at the railroad's completion.

Ching wrote his own libretto for the one-act Remove Shoes Before Entering (RSBE), which, like Speed Dating Tonight!, is another modular opera in which each cast member has a showcase aria in a variety of operatic styles, and the modules or vignettes can be re-arranged or dropped, and new modules can be created specific to a performance venue. The opera premiered in February 2020 at the University of Alabama, which commissioned the work. This was right before COVID-19 lockdowns, and subsequent planned performances at other venues that year were dropped. Productions post-lockdown have included Amarillo Opera, Heartland Opera Theatre, Taos Opera Institute, Kennesaw State University, Charlottesville Opera, and the Chicago College of Performing Arts at Roosevelt University. The plot of the opera involves students who visit a mysterious abandoned rural building, and experience memories and revelations – some of them happy or triumphant, and some sad, dark, or intense.

During COVID-19 lockdowns, Ching partnered with librettist Deborah Brevoort to create the 10-minute comic opera Dinner 4 3, part of an October 2020 opera web series titled "Tales from a Safe Distance" by Fargo-Moorhead Opera and the Decameron Opera Coalition. The opera, inspired by Boccaccio's The Decameron's Day 5, Story 10, concerns a wealthy businessman and his trophy wife who are both unfulfilled in their marriage and clandestinely search internet dating sites for extra-marital partners.

==== 2024 to present ====
Ching was commissioned by the University of South Dakota's USD Opera to write and score an opera on the life of the dramatic Spanish-French mezzo-soprano, composer, and pedagogue Pauline Viardot (1821–1910). The three-act work, Notes on Viardot, premiered at the university in April 2024, conducted by Ching. The story is told in flashbacks as a journalist interviews Viardot near the end of her life, and within Ching's original compositions the music weaves in songs and melodies from Viardot's own compositions plus arias she sang during her career.

In 2025, Northern State University premiered his Hazel Miner, with a libretto by Marla Fogderud, based on a young woman from North Dakota who sacrificed herself to save her siblings in a horrific blizzard.

== Selected works ==
- Leo: Opera in One Cat (1985)
- Cue 67 (1992)
- King of the Clouds (1993)
- Buoso's Ghost (1996)
- Out of the Rain (1998)
- Faith (1999)
- Corps of Discovery (2003)
- Three Pigs Remix (2006)
- A Midsummer Night's Dream (2011)
- Slaying the Dragon (2012)
- Speed Dating Tonight! (2013)
- Alice Ryley (2015)
- Anna Hunter, the Spirit of Savannah (2017)
- Thriver (2019)
- Seven Woods and a Van (2019)
- Remove Shoes Before Entering (RSBE) (2020)
- Notes on Viardot (2024)

== Personal life ==
In 2010 Ching moved from Memphis to Ames, Iowa, where his wife Barbara was professor of English at Iowa State University and was chair of the English department from 2010 through 2018.

As of 2025, they live in Saint Paul, Minnesota.
