= Connecticut Opera =

American non-profit opera company

The Bushnell Theatre in Hartford, Connecticut, where Connecticut Opera's inaugural performance took place on April 14, 1942

Connecticut Opera was a professional, non-profit, opera company based in Hartford, Connecticut, and a member of OPERA America. The company presented three fully staged opera productions during an annual season. It was founded in 1942 under the directorship of Frank Pandolfi and was the sixth oldest professional opera company in the United States. Pandolfi served as general manager of the company for 32 years and brought most of the major international opera stars of that time to Hartford. The first opera produced was Carmen which opened in the Bushnell Theatre on April 14, 1942, and starred mezzo-soprano Winifred Heidt in the title role. Connecticut Opera went on to feature opera stars such as Plácido Domingo, Beverly Sills, Risë Stevens, and Mary Dunleavy.

After Pandolfi left the company, Connecticut Opera shifted direction, moving away from the star system towards hiring young and talented rising artists. The company also became interested in cutting-edge theatrical sets, lighting, costumes, and other technical areas of theater before such a move became in vogue within the opera world. In the mid-1970s, the company founded Opera Express, an award-winning touring company that focused on bringing operatic programs to more than 3 million youths, seniors, and disadvantaged citizens in the region. During the early 1980s, Connecticut Opera received national and international recognition through pioneer arena productions of Aida and Turandot.

In the spring of 1999, the board of trustees embarked on an aggressive path of growth and re-invention for the company. This change in direction was marked by a change in management structure as well. The artistic and administrative activities of the company were split. A single General Director was replaced with a management team headed by Artistic Director, Willie Anthony Waters, and managing director, Maria Levy (a position later held by Linda Jackson).

In February 2009, after 67 seasons, Connecticut Opera closed down. Citing adverse economic conditions, John E. Kreitler, chairman of the opera board told The Hartford Courant:

"We have ceased business and we are trying to work out the arrangements with our secured creditor about what will be done with our very few remaining assets."

By its final season, Connecticut Opera had a yearly budget of about $2 million and 2,000 subscribers. Ticket prices for its performances ranged from $25 to $100. Their last production was Don Giovanni, which opened at the Palace Theater in Waterbury, Connecticut, on November 8, 2008. The poor turnout for that production coupled with the drying up of corporate and individual donations led to the company's bank accounts being frozen. The final two productions of the 2008–09 season were to have been The Daughter of the Regiment and La bohème.

== See also ==
- Connecticut Grand Opera and Orchestra
- Connecticut Lyric Opera
