= Cardone =

Cardone is a surname of Italian origin. Notable people with the surname include:

- Alberto Cardone (1920–1977), Italian film director of spaghetti western films
- Christopher Cardone (born 1957), American Archbishop of the Roman Catholic Church in the Solomon Islands
- Giuseppe Cardone (born 1974), Italian football player
- J. S. Cardone (born 1946), American film director and producer
- Kathleen Cardone (born 1953), United States District Judge for Texas
- Nathalie Cardone (born 1967), French actress
- Raffaele Cardone (born 1934), Italian opera singer and director
- Vivien Cardone (born 1993), American actress
