= Juan Pablo Jofre =

Argentinian bandoneonist (born 1983)

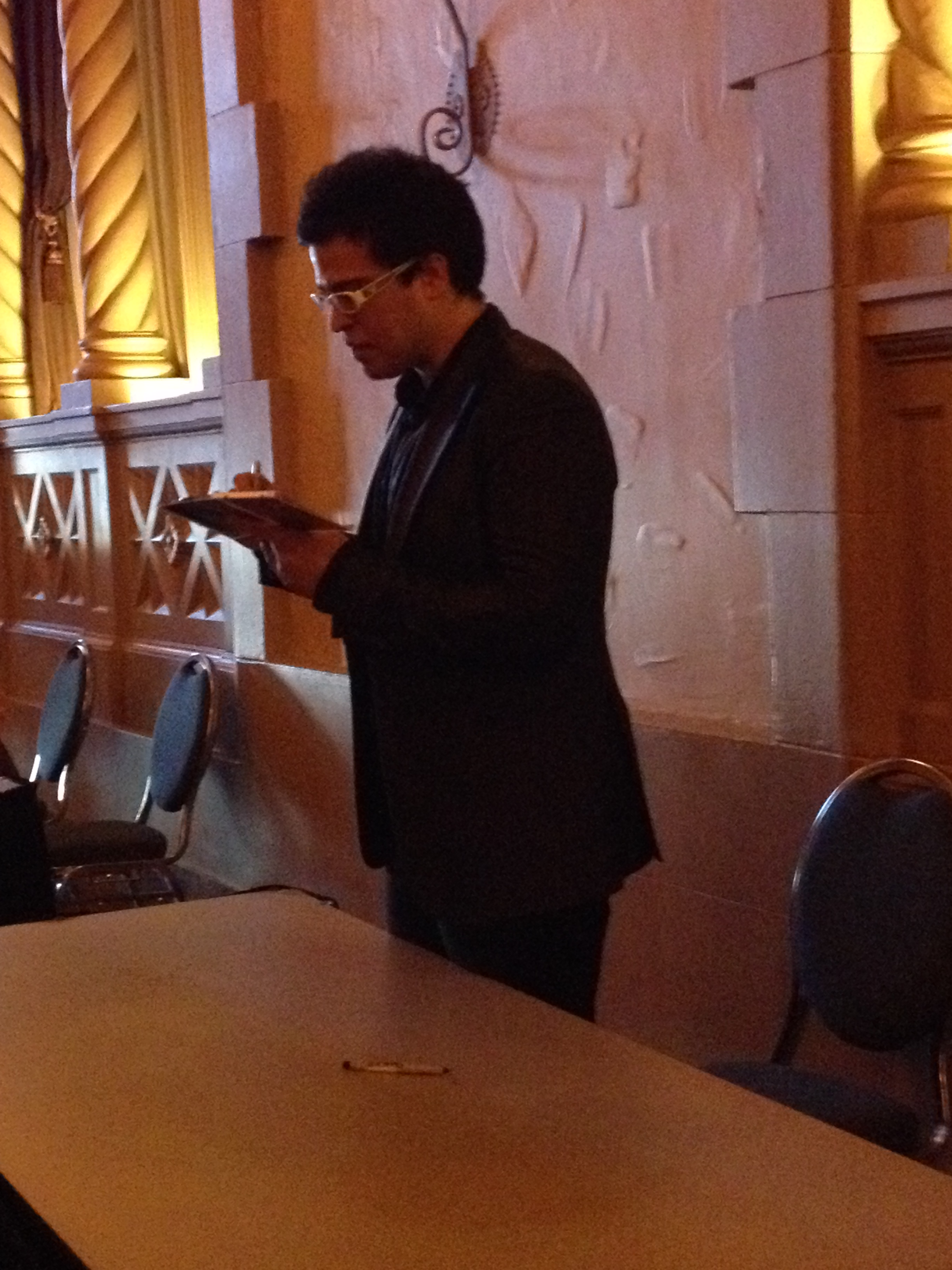
- Jofre in 2014

Background information
- Also known as: J. P. Jofre
- Born: 1983 (age 42–43); San Juan, Argentina
- Genres: Classical; tango; jazz
- Occupations: Musician; composer; arranger
- Instrument: Bandoneon
- Years active: 2000s–present
- Education: Escuela de Música, San Juan
- Website: www.jpjofre.com

Juan Pablo Jofre (also known as J. P. Jofre; born 1983) is a Grammy-nominated Argentine bandoneonist, composer and arranger.

== Life ==
Jofre was born in San Juan, Argentina. He attended San Juan's Escuela de Música. He was primarily a drummer, though also studied the vibraphone, bassoon, piano, double bass and singing. He played in a heavy metal band. At age 17, his uncle played a Astor Piazzolla record for him, and Jofre fell in love with the sound and style of the bandoneon.

In 2002 or 2003, he relocated to New York City with his mother and brother. His brother, who is deaf, struggled to find decent education in Argentina, but succeeded in finding it in New York. He lives and works in Harlem in New York City.

== Career ==
Upon learning the bandoneon, he was overwhelmed by how complex the instrument was. He used a piano to figure out the keys played by the bandoneon buttons, and read guide books. He eventually took lessons from Daniel Binelli. Jofre also began studying in Buenos Aires. He would take the bus for sixteen hours, twice a month, to take classes from Julio Pane. Jofre also composes his own music and has been called a "creative composer" by saxophonist Paquito D'Rivera. His compositions range in genre and sound, including jazz and pieces for string orchestras. In March 2014, he debuted his Bandoneon Concerto with the Symphony Silicon Valley in San Jose, California. He has performed on the television show Rosie Live. In July 2017, he performed in Minneapolis in the Mill City Summer Opera production of Astor Piazzolla's tango opera, María de Buenos Aires.

In 2019, he performed in the Naumburg Orchestral Concerts, at the Naumburg Bandshell, Central Park, in the summer series.

=== Hard Tango ===
His debut album, Hard Tango, was released in 2012. The album includes original compositions by Jofre and was described as a "classical-tango hybrid" by The New York Times. The album also features works by Astor Piazzolla, Fernando Otero and Leo Brouwer, as well as the Lennon–McCartney song "I Am the Walrus".

== Discography ==
- Hard Tango (self-released, 2012)
- Astor Piazzolla: Escualo (Harmonia Mundi, 2015) – with Lucia Lin and Ann Hobson Pilot
- Aspire (Musica Solis, 2022) – with the London Symphony Orchestra
- Sur (PentaTone, 2026) – Daniela Mack and Eric Silberger
- JP Jofre: Double Concerto No. 1 for Violin & Bandoneon (Progressive Sounds, 2018)
- Be Like Water
- Manifesto
