= Daniel Rodríguez (tenor) =

American singer (born 1964)

Daniel Rodriguez
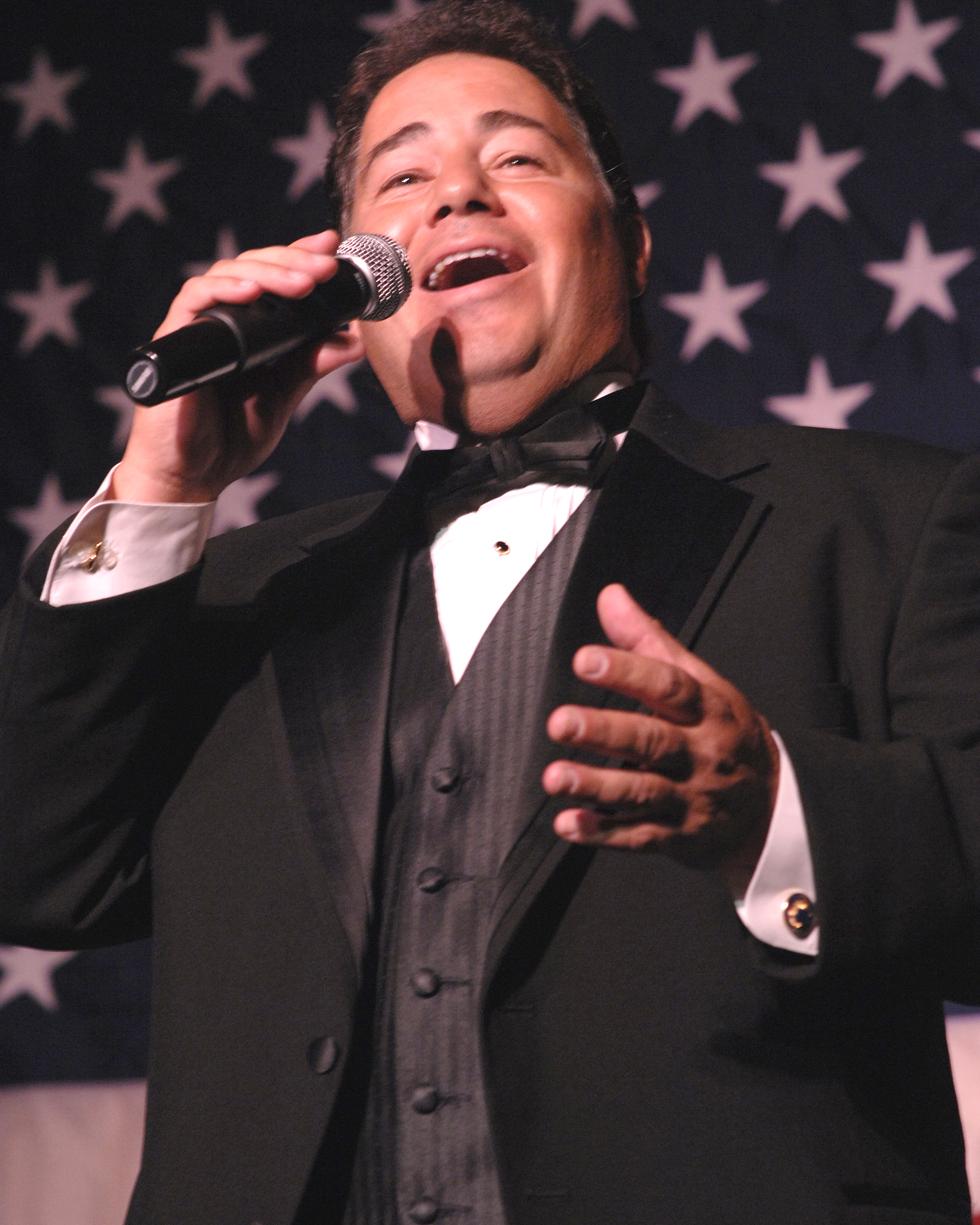
- Rodríguez in 2008

Background information
- Also known as: "America's Tenor"
- Born: May 24, 1964 (age 62); Brooklyn, New York, U.S.
- Genres: Classical, spiritual, traditional, jazz
- Occupation: Singer
- Years active: 1980–present
- Label: Blix Street Records
- Website: danielrodrigueztenor.com

Daniel Rodriguez (born May 24, 1964) is an American operatic tenor from New York City. He became known as "The Singing Policeman" in his former work with the New York City Police Department, due to his role as one of the department's designated national anthem singers. In the aftermath of the September 11 terrorist attacks, he received widespread attention with his rendition of "God Bless America", which he sang at memorial events and on television. This led to an offer of formal training from Plácido Domingo. Rodriguez has recorded numerous albums and appeared as lead tenor in several operas. He regularly appears in support of his chosen charities, as well as performing a full domestic and international concert schedule.

== Early years ==
Rodriguez, born in Brooklyn, New York, was the first of two children born to Carmen and Jose Rodriguez, who had emigrated from Puerto Rico as teenagers. Rodriguez' father and grandfather were both tenors, and other family members played various musical instruments. He cites the singing of Mario Lanza as an early musical influence after seeing the movie The Great Caruso.

At the age of ten, he began a serious study of music. His teen years were spent studying, and later as assistant director at the American Youth Repertory Company in Manhattan, under the tutelage of Juilliard trained Elliot Dorfman. During his early years, he also studied with Juilliard's Aldo Bruschi, as well as Miraslov Markoff from the Moscow Ballet and Opera company. Rodriguez performed in Carnegie Hall Del Terzo recital hall at age 16.

After he married at 19 and had a son, Rodriguez put music on hold, as he worked at a series of jobs, including short-order cook, caterer, taxi driver, truck driver, and postal worker, before joining the police force. At age 25, he returned to music, by performing in concerts he developed himself, organizing an ensemble of musicians called Broadway Magic, performing around New York at retirement communities, churches, and for local charities.

== Career highlights ==
Rodriguez entered the New York City Police Academy in 1995. After singing at his own graduation, he was chosen as one of the designated national anthem singers in the NYPD's ceremonial division. New York City Mayor Rudolph Giuliani who had seen Rodriguez perform at various events, used his influence to arrange an audition for him at the Metropolitan Opera. His lack of classical training proved an insurmountable obstacle, however, and the Met dismissed him after he had sung but two notes.

In June 2001, Rodriguez was the subject of a Cable News Network special about a New York City police officer who sang at Carnegie Hall. He was driving to work over the Verrazano Bridge in New York City at the time of the September 11 terrorist attack, and was two blocks away from the World Trade Center when it collapsed. "I lived the horrors of 9/11 and made peace with God several times that day, and said goodbye to my family once or twice, and realized I was meant to stick around and do something positive with my life." He would spend the next several months working at Ground zero, interrupted only by requests to sing at official functions, memorials, and media events. Rodriguez performed the national anthem "The Star Spangled Banner" at "Prayer for America" on September 23, 2001, at Yankee Stadium. He once again sang the national anthem "The Star Spangled Banner" in the 75th Macy's Thanksgiving Day Parade as a special tribute to the 9/11 attacks.

He was soon appearing on news and talk shows including, The Today Show, The Early Show, Larry King Live, Late Show with David Letterman, "The Oprah Winfrey Show", and Live with Regis and Kelly. He was also interviewed in 2002 and 2005 on Christopher Close-up. Rodriguez has been quoted as saying "Watching the Twin Towers collapse didn't make me sing any better. But the passion for the music has changed and for what I represent: The comfort and the feeling of national pride that I bring now more than I did before." He performed at the September 23, 2001 "Prayer For America" concert, honoring the victims of the September 11 terror attacks. Plácido Domingo, who was also on the bill, heard him sing and invited him to attend the Domingo/Vilar Young Artists Institute in Washington D.C. for 18 months of opera study. After seven years as a police officer and then finally gaining national recognition as a singer, he explains, "I wasn't a cop who started singing; I was a singer who became a cop...I've been given the gift to sing. I sing for those who have lost loved ones."

At Carnegie Hall's 111th season opening, October 2001, he sang "God Bless America", with the Berlin Philharmonic in a tribute to 9/11. He also signs his first recording contract in October 2001 offered by Manhattan Record Company's Arif Mardin and Ian Ralfini. Rodriguez was the first artist to sign with newly re-activated Manhattan, a division of EMI. In Mardin's life story, he describes Rodriguez as "golden voiced".

His debut performance before a worldwide audience occurred when he sang "God Bless America" at the opening ceremonies of the 2002 Winter Olympics in Salt Lake City, Utah. June 13, 2002, saw his first public concert backed by full symphony orchestra at Pittsburgh's Heinz Hall with the Pittsburgh Symphony Orchestra conducted by Lucas Richman. August 2002, Rodriguez performed at the Hollywood Bowl in "The Great American Concert: New York, New York" with John Mauceri conducting.

Broadcast on ESPN in 2003, he sang the US national anthem at the Indianapolis 500, and returned in 2008 to perform at the Indianapolis Motor Speedway for the Allstate 400 NASCAR Sprint Cup. In 2004, he was part of a concert hosted by CNN anchor Paula Zahn, and TV personality Pat Sajak. along with the Pittsburgh Symphony Orchestra at Heinz Hall in, in tribute to Fred Rogers, better known to children around the world as Mister Rogers.

With his emerging success as a singer of both popular and classical music, he retired from the New York City Police Department in May 2004, to pursue music full-time. The following year he performed at a Memorial Mass at New York City's Cathedral of Saint Patrick, for Rainier III, Prince of Monaco who died April 6, 2005. In 2004 Rodríguez performed with the Indianapolis Symphony Orchestra, as host of the Christmas Yuletide Celebration concert series, with Jack Everly principal pops conductor. In 2005 he hosted the inaugural production of Holiday Spectacular at the Joseph Meyerhoff Symphony Hall with the Baltimore Symphony Orchestra.

He appeared at the 50th anniversary of the Crystal Cathedral in Garden Grove, California in April 2005, broadcast worldwide on Hour of Power. He has been a frequent guest since his first appearance in April 2002. In June, he performed his debut with the Boston Pops Orchestra at Symphony Hall. In 2005, he appeared at the West Point Cadet Chapel at the United States Military Academy, New York, performing with the cadets to record "Into the Fire" for the CD/DVD Stand Ye Steady: Songs of Courage and Inspiration. In September of that year, Rodríguez appeared as part of promotion of that CD/DVD on nationally broadcast QVC, performing "Into The Fire".

On September 11, 2006, Rodríguez appeared on The Tonight Show with Jay Leno, wherein he performed "Amazing Grace" accompanied by professional pianist, Mike Garson. In 2009, Rodriguez performed a number of concerts in tribute to legendary singer, Mario Lanza, on the 50th anniversary of his death. 2009 began a nationwide tour across America, performing in over 110 cites.

In August 2010, Rodriguez performed at a New York City rally against the building of an Islamic mosque near Ground Zero. In February 2011, he performed at Opera Tampa's "Night of Stars" gala to honor Plácido Domingo. 2011 marked a period of time where he explored a new repertoire in jazz, with a series of performances with the Jesse Lynch Trio. That year he collaborated with Andy Cooney and Michael Amante as "The New York Tenors" in a series of concerts. On September 11, 2012, Rodriguez performed the national anthem at Pearl Harbor in Hawaii for a 9/11 siunset memorial service. On December 19, Rodriguez with the New York Tenors performed in a sold-out Christmas show at Carnegie Hall.

On March 1, 2013, he performed at "Idol Across America" kick off in New York City. On November 11, 2014, Rodriguez performed in the 95th annual Veterans Day parade in New York City. On September 24, 2015, he performed at John F. Kennedy Airport as part of welcoming ceremony for Pope Francis' arrival in New York City.

In 2018 and 2019, Rodriguez continued his appearances as keynote speaker.

== Capitol and presidential performances ==
In May 2002, Rodríguez performed in Washington D.C. at the National Law Enforcement Officers memorial, where President Bush paid tribute to him with the following words: "I want to thank Daniel Rodriguez for lending his fabulous voice in tribute after tribute to the greatness of America. He performed at Ford's Theater Gala Celebration in 2002, attended by President George W. Bush. Other Capitol Hill performances were the National Memorial Day Concerts in Washington D.C. in 2002 and 2006 with conductor Erich Kunzel, and the "Celebration of Freedom" concert in January, 2005, honoring Bush's second inauguration as President. He performed at the 2011 National Memorial Day Concert in Washington DC under direction of Jack Everly. He also appeared at the 2004 Republican National Convention in New York City's Madison Square Garden where he performed "Amazing Grace.". In June 2007, he performed the national anthem at the Jefferson Memorial, next to Challenger, for the delisting ceremony of the American bald eagle. As part of the 2007 Summer Music Festival, Rodriguez performed a solo concert, accompanied by classical pianist Victoria Ulanov, at the Washington National Cathedral in Washington D.C.

== International appearances ==
September 11, 2003, Rodriguez was seen on the British TV show Today with Des and Mel hosted by Des O'Connor and Melanie Sykes. In November 2004, Rodriguez traveled to Monaco at the invitation of the IPA (International Police Association), for their 10th Anniversary Gala. Along with the Pipes and Drums unit of the Chicago Police Department, he sang at the royal palace for Albert II, Prince of Monaco, and at a requiem mass for Princess Grace of Monaco. 2004, appearances in New Zealand in numerous cities, including Wellington, Feilding, and Dunedin. Rodriguez traveled to Aichi, Japan for the 2005 Expo 2005 World's Fair, where he performed at the US Pavilion. He appeared in multiple Christmas tours during those years in the Netherlands. In 2008 he performed with Sharon Kips and Jimmy Earl Perry during the Hour of Power Kerstconcerten. January 2009, he appeared on TV NZ for a live interview discussing events at the upcoming inauguration of U.S. President elect, Barack Obama. In 2009 Rodriguez also performed in New Zealand with his wife in a "Legendary Lanza" concert tour. In 2010 he performed in New Zealand at the Queenstown Winter Festival.

== Opera performances ==
Rodriguez made his operatic debut as Canio in Ruggero Leoncavallo's Pagliacci in New York City with the Chelsea Opera in June 2006. New York Times music critic Anthony Tommasini wrote, "it was impossible not to respond to his portrayal. When he sang the touchstone aria,Vesti la giubba, venting Canio's grief and humiliation, you sensed that here was someone pouring out years of pent-up artistic longing." In 2007 Rodríguez performed again as Canio with Granite State Opera Company in New Hampshire, where he was awarded "2007 Best Performance of a leading male", by Opera online magazine. Paul Joseph Walkowski of Opera Online wrote of that performance by Rodriguez: "electrifying, pure magic, pure energy, pure emotion and blazing in glory. As Canio he stood in a class by himself: a star of easily recognizable magnitude and a force to be reckoned with on the opera stage." In 2008 at the Opera of the Hamptons, Southampton, New York, Rodriguez sang the role of Turridu opposite international soprano Cristina Fontanelli, in Pietro Mascagni's one-act opera, Cavalleria Rusticana. June 2012 Daniel performs in Madama Butterfly with Chelsea Opera in role of Lt. B. F. Pinkerton.

== Personal life ==
Daniel is married to Marla Kavanaugh, a soprano who has performed around the world in concert and in opera. She was born in Dunedin, New Zealand and began her stage career at the age of five. He and his wife often travel to perform together. They have one daughter, born in New Zealand in 2009. Daniel has a son and daughter, from his first marriage. He lists fishing as his favorite pastime, and is also an experienced scuba diver.

== Philanthropy and charity work ==
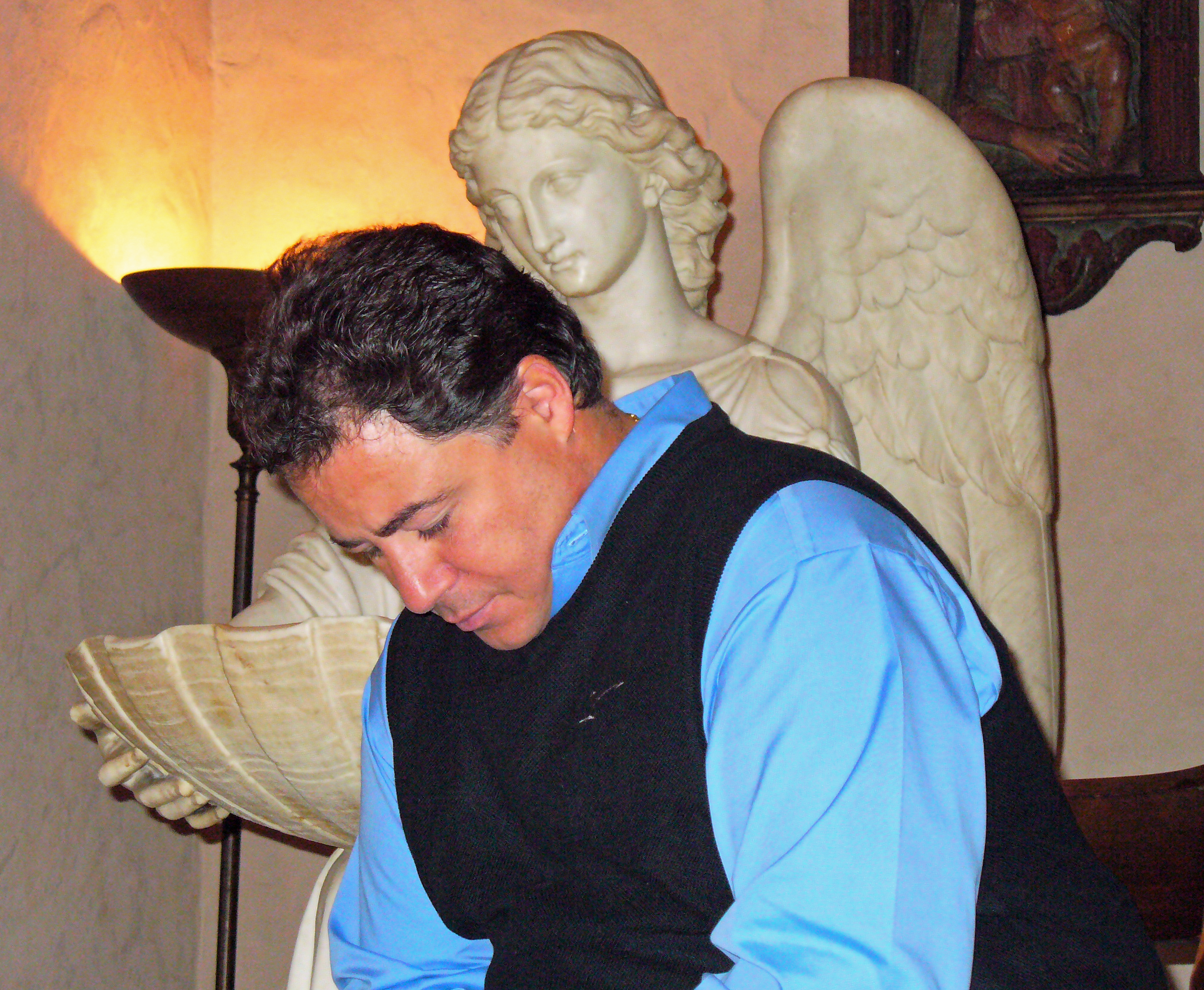

Rodriguez has made appearances for The City of Hope National Medical Center, Duke University Hospital Children's Center, and is a regular at fundraising events for The Jimmy V Foundation for cancer research, and the Hilton Head Celebrity Golf Tournament to benefit children's charities. He has performed for the annual New York Tunnel to Towers run to benefit the Stephen Siller children's foundation, and the Community Mayors Organization to benefit disabled children, where he is an honorary board member. He is a regular performer at Loma Linda University Medical Center Children's Hospital annual fundraisers, and in 2009 performed in concert with Broadway soprano Laurie Gayle Stephenson.

Broadcast on PBS August 2002, titled "Spirit of America" a benefit concert for the Scoliosis Care Foundation taped at Caesars Atlantic City, starred Daniel Rodriguez, guest performances by Linda Eder, Arturo Sandoval, Phoebe Snow, and Aprile Millo, orchestra conducted by Tom Scott. In 2003 Rodriguez performed in Appleton Wisconsin, at the International Community Partnerships Conference Security Through Stability featuring former Soviet Union President and Nobel Peace Prize recipient Mikhail Gorbachev. The following year he traveled to New Zealand for his debut tour, where he sang at a benefit for victims of recent flooding in that country.

He has been a longtime supporter of the United Service Organization with appearances at fundraisers, as well as visiting troops at military hospitals. In 2005, his project "Songs for the Soldiers", provided music in USO care packages for American troops overseas.

He performs at retirement communities, for police and firefighter support events, and for veterans causes, including appearances with the VA-National Medical Music Group. October 2006, New York City, Rodríguez kicked off World Children's Day at McDonald's, joined by Dancing with the Stars winner Emmitt Smith, runner-up Mario Lopez, the Duchess of York and other stars at anniversary event supporting World Children's Day at McDonald's. Rodríguez, named as "Goodwill Ambassador" supporting for "Heart for Children", with concert tour "Kerstconcerten 2008" . On February 14, 2010, Rodríguez was honored by the Sacramento Chapter of the Sons of the American Revolution with a Silver Good Citizenship Medal.

January 2011, Rodriguez performed in Greymouth New Zealand for families of the 29 miners killed in underground explosions in November 2010. 2012 teams up with Gary Sinise in concerts around America to raise funds for homebuilding for severely injured returning troops. September 14, 2013, travels to Kandahar, Afghanistan to perform as representative of the Tunnel to Towers Steven Siller Foundation.

== Honors and awards ==
- 2002 Disney Humanitarian award.
- 2003 The first Raul Julia Award, by the Puerto Rican Family Institute, in appreciation of his charitable work.
- 2004 Monaco IPA Association Humanity Award
- 2007 Queens Centers for Progress Humanitarian Award for his philanthropic spirit and commitment to making a difference in the life of all Americans.
- 2007 Ellen Harden Woolworth Medal for Patriotism by the Daughters of the American Revolution
- 2007 Lifetime Achievement Award from the USO for his work on the Care Package Program.
- 2008 Honored by "Stars" page for inclusion on USA Patriotism site.
- 2009 Selected as Goodwill Ambassador for Hart voor Kinderen for his humanitarian efforts
- 2009 National Award Recipient: Freedoms Foundation at Valley Forge Broward County Chapter
- 2010 SAR Silver Medal for Good Citizenship: Sacramento Chapter of the Sons of the American Revolution.

== Career timeline ==
- 1976 - Acceptance at The American Youth Repertoire Company in Manhattan to study music and performance
- 1980 - First Carnegie Hall recital
- 2001 - Invitation by Plácido Domingo to study with him, after hearing his voice at "Prayer for America."
- 2001 - Signs first recording contract with EMI/Manhattan Record Company for a single, plus two full albums
- 2001 - Release of 2-track single album "God Bless America"
- 2002 - First vocal performance on a national stage at Winter Olympics in Salt Lake City Utah.
- 2002 - "Spirit of America" album released and goes to #1 on Billboards Classical Crossover chart
- 2002 - PBS broadcasts "Spirit of America" concert from Caesars Atlantic City
- 2002 - First public symphonic concert, Heinz Hall with the Pittsburgh Symphony Orchestra
- 2002 - Performance in concert tribute to New York, at the Hollywood bowl
- 2004 - Sang at the Republican National Convention in New York City, Madison Square Garden.
- 2004 - Performed in Monaco for Albert II, Prince of Monaco and members of the royal family
- 2005 - Sang at the Celebration of Freedom" concert at the inauguration of U.S. President G. W. Bush
- 2005 - Release of album "In The Presence" with Blix Street Records
- 2006 - Operatic debut as Canio in Pagliacci with Chelsea Opera Company, New York
- 2007 - "Best performance 2007" by Operaonline, as Canio in Pagliacci, Granite State Opera, New Hampshire
- 2008 - Performance in Cavalleria Rusticana, sings role of Turridu, Opera of the Hamptons, New York
- 2009/2010 - 117 city concert tour across America
- 2011 - Begins series of concerts as member of the "New York Tenors"
- 2012 - Performance in memorial ceremony on the USS Missouri at Pearl Harbor, Hawaii on September 11.
- 2012 - Performs at a sold out Christmas show at Carnegie Hall as member of the "New York Tenors"
- 2013 - Release of first Spanish album "Por Ti Volare"
- 2014 - Release of Christmas album "A Glorious Christmas"
- 2014 - Highlights November New York City Veterans Day parade with patriotic artist Scott Lobaido
- 2015 - Returns to New Zealand for 6th concert tour, including performance at US Embassy, Wellington
- 2015 - Carnegie Hall Christmas show with The New York Tenors final show of their 2015 series
- 2016 - Kennedy Airport performance ceremony as final World Trade Center artifacts removed from storage after 15 years.
- 2016 - With The New York Tenors Christmas at Lincoln Center raise 1 million dollars for "Futures in Education"
- 2017 - US Capitol, Anthem performance - National Peace Officers Memorial Service
- 2017 - Christmas Performances at Carnegie Hall and Lincoln Center New York City
- 2018 - Keynote speaker appearances
- 2018 - Return to Carnegie Hall with the New York Tenors.
- 2019 - Host at Tunnel to Towers Foundation annual 5k
- 2019 - In concert with the New York Tenors including sold out Carnegie Hall

== Discography ==
=== Daniel Rodriguez ===
Title	Year	Label	Notes
God Bless America	2001	Manhattan	Two track single, God Bless America arranged and produced by Tom Scott: We Will Go On arranged and produced by Joe Mardin. A spoken introduction by then-New York City Mayor Rudolph Giuliani. Record profits donated (over $250,000) to the Twin Towers Fund to benefit survivors of the September 11 attacks
Spirit of America	2002	Manhattan	Produced by Tom Scott: Joe Mardin produced track We Will Go On. Album Goes to #1 on the Classical Billboards chart
From My Heart	2003	Manhattan	Produced by Tom Scott. Includes duet "The Prayer" with Kristin Chenoweth
Be My Love	2003	Manhattan	Produced by Tom Scott. Internationally released, includes duet "The Prayer" by Isobel Cooper
In The Presence	2005	Blix Street Records	Produced by David Rideau, Daniel Rodriguez, Terry Rindal. Includes duets with Lea Salonga, Panis angelicus and Pie Jesu
I Believe (international version)	2008		Limited international release produced by Hour of Power, The Netherlands. www.hourofpower.nl/ Ex.Producer Louis Pool, Herman de Vaal. Includes duet "The Prayer" with Marla Kavanaugh. Recorded live in Grote Kerk Apeldoorn December 2007, by HofBV, Haren. Profits to support "Hart voor Children" organization in Pretoria South Africa.
I Believe (U.S. version)	2009	Blix Street Records	Released in the United States in 2009, produced by Louis Pool.
Daniel Rodriguez Amazing Grace	2011	JQZ Musiekproducties	Producer Jan Quintus Zwart
Por Ti Volare	2013	Blix Street Records	Produced by Robert Navarro, executive producers William Melendez and Daniel Rodríguez
A Glorious Christmas	2014	D. Rodriguez	Produced by Daniel Rodriguez and David Rideau
Daniel Rodriguez: A Musical Journey	2015	Hour of Power	DVD producers -Executive Producers-Daniel Rodriguez, David Rideau: Producers - Jim & Susan Dawson, Evelyn Freed: Video Producers - Amy Powell

=== Various with Rodríguez tracks ===
Title	Year	Label	Notes
The Metropolitan Museum of Art: Classical Music of America	2002	EMI Music Special Markets, ASIN: BoooEMDV4Q	Rodriguez track 'God Bless America
New Found Freedom	2003	Higher Octave	produced by Tom Scott. Rodriguez track Everything must change
Yuletide Celebration	2004		Produced by Indianapolis Symphony Orchestra; Rodriguez track Oh Holy Night
A tribute to Ronald Reagan	2004	Capitol Records	Rodriguez tracks God Bless America, America The Beautiful
Stand Ye Steady	2005	Curtain Call Productions	Rodriguez track "Into The Fire"
The Best of Johnnie Carl	2006		Produced by the Crystal Cathedral, Rodriguez track On Eagles Wings
The Sounds of Freedom and Faith	2007		Produced by the Crystal Cathedral, Rodriguez tracks America the Beautiful, An American Hymn
The Very Best Musical Moments of the Hour of Power	2008		Produced by the Crystal Cathedral. Rodriguez track Nearer My God To Thee

== See also ==
- List of Puerto Ricans
