= Savannah Voice Festival =

The Savannah VOICE Festival is a classical music, opera and art song festival in Savannah, Georgia. It was founded in 2013 by opera singers Sherrill Milnes and Maria Zouves, as an outgrowth of the VOICExperience Foundation, a non-profit which the couple founded in 2001. The Festival presents an annual season of concerts, recitals, staged operas and master classes at venues around Savannah, including Westin Savannah Harbor, Yamacraw Center for Performing Arts at the Esther F. Garrison School for the Arts, the Davenport House Museum - Kennedy Pharmacy and the Charles H. Morris Center.

The festival runs throughout August featuring performances by resident Festival Artists and education programs. Other special events occur outside of the August season. The festival presented the 2015 premiere of Michael Ching's Alice Ryley, which was commissioned by the Milnes VOICE Programs, followed in 2017 by the premier of Ching's Anna Hunter (the Spirit of Savannah), another festival commission. Ching has served as the festival's composer-in-residence for several seasons.

In 2015, Metropolitan Opera mezzo-soprano Jennifer Johnson Cano and pianist Christopher Cano recorded a live recital album, Unaffected: Live from The Savannah Voice Festival which is available from Amazon, iTunes and other music streaming and distribution sites. The Festival presented composer Carlisle Floyd with the VOICExperience Foundation's third annual Sherrill Milnes VOICE Award as part of Opera America's National Opera Week in 2015, having previously presented the award to Mignon Dunn (2014) and Diana Soviero (2013).
