= Opera Las Vegas =

Nonprofit organization

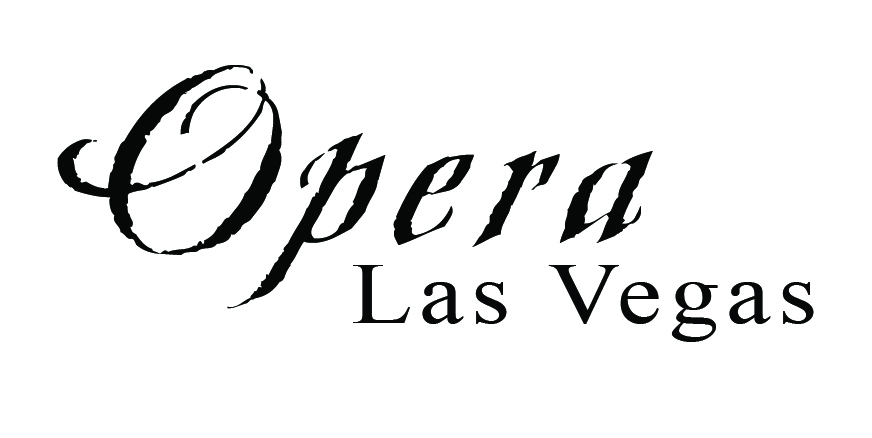
- Abbreviation: OLV
- Formation: 1999
- Founders: Mark Thomsen, Paul Kreider, and Gloria Marinacci Allen
- Type: Opera company
- General director: Cecilia Violetta López
- Music director: Joshua Horsch
- Website: operalasvegas.com

Opera Las Vegas (OLV) is an opera company serving the Las Vegas Valley. Opera Las Vegas is a 501(c)(3) nonprofit corporation with a volunteer board of directors from the fields of law, accounting, planning and marketing as well as the musical and theatrical arts.

Opera Las Vegas was established in 1999 by tenor Mark Thomsen, Dr. Paul Kreider of the UNLV music faculty, and Gloria Marinacci Allen, an acclaimed soprano opera singer. They were enthusiastically joined by other like-minded individuals who wanted to bring quality opera theatre to Southern Nevada. The company began producing major opera performances in 2005 with a well-received Carmen.

Opera Las Vegas provides training to Las Vegas singers by giving them the opportunity to perform roles in fully produced operas. The Opera Las Vegas Youth Chorus was established in 2017 and is hosted by the Thurman White Academy. In the fall of 2021, OLV formed collaborative relationships with the Las Vegas Philharmonic and the Las Vegas Master Singers.

In 2020, 2021, 2022, and 2023, the company received grants from the National Endowment of the Arts to support an ongoing Living Composers and Librettists Initiative, which provides second or subsequent (and often, West Coast Premieres) of worthy new works, in order to help establish them in the operatic canon.

Opera Las Vegas is Nevada's professional company member in Opera America, the National Opera Center.

== Presidents ==
- 2003 – 2004: John Krieger
- 2005 – 2006: Joyce La Grange
- 2008 – 2009: James Frank
- 2010 – 2012: Caroline Orzes
- 2013 – 2014: Stephen Silberkraus
- 2015: John Krieger
- 2016 – 2017: Dana Barooshian
- 2017 – 2019: Stephanie Buntin
- 2019 - 2020: Paxton Fleming
- 2021–Present: William Schroder
