= Opera for the Young =

Youth opera group

Opera for the Young is a professional, touring opera company based in Madison, Wisconsin. Founded in 1970, it brings professional opera programs to elementary schools throughout the Midwest during its spring and fall tours. With nearly 200 performances, reaching approximately 70,000 children annually, Opera for the Young can be counted among the largest opera outreach programs in the nation.

Opera for the Young’s repertoire include age appropriate adaptations of Gretry's Beauty and the Beast, Massenet's Cinderella, Mozart's The Magic Flute, Rossini's The Barber of Seville, Dvořák's Rusalka, Humperdinck's Hansel and Gretel, Donizetti's The Elixir of Love, Sullivan's The Pirates of Penzance, and Orpheus Returns: The Case of the Underworld Zoo with music from Offenbach, Gluck, and Monteverdi.
