= Carol Sams =

American composer (born 1945)

Carol Sams (born 1945) is an American composer based in the Seattle area. She earned a Master of Arts in Music from Mills College and a Doctor of Musical Arts from the University of Washington. One of her teachers was Darius Milhaud. In 1976 her opera, Salome, Daughter of Herodias, was premiered at the National Opera Association Convention in Seattle. In 1983 her children's opera Beauty and the Beast was premiered in Los Angeles with Henry Holt conducting. Her opera The Pied Piper of Hamelin was commissioned by the Tacoma Opera, and was premiered by the company in 1993 and repeated in 1994. Her works have also been performed in concerts by the Seattle Chamber Singers, the Everett Chorale, the Northwest Boychoir, the Washington Composers Forum, and the University of Washington Contemporary Group among others. Soprano Janeanne Houston released a CD "So Much Beauty" which contained several songs by Carol Sams.
