= Tacoma Opera =

Tacoma Opera is the Pacific Northwest's second-largest professional opera company located in Tacoma, WA and is a member of OPERA America. The company presents two to three operas a year. The 2015-16 season includes Don Giovanni, Die Fledermaus, and The Threepenny Opera. After several online endeavors during the pandemic, the company reemerged in 2022 with The Drunken Tenor's Operapalooza Spectacular Shindig, Carmina Burana with Tacoma City Ballet, and Tacoma Method.

== History ==
Tacoma Opera was founded in 1968. While the company initially enjoyed several years of success, the company folded in the late 1970s. In 1981, Hans Wolf, then director of community outreach for Seattle Opera, successfully rebounded the company with the help of Pacific Lutheran University's then dean Richard Moe and the PLU fine arts staff. Wolf then served as the company's general director until the late 1990s, during which time Tacoma Opera produced several premieres, including the West Coast premiere of Offenbach's Christopher Columbus and the world premiere of Seattle composer Carol Sams' The Pied Piper of Hamelin. The current General Director, Limuel Forgey, succeeded the former director, Noel Koran, in February 2023.
