= Connecticut Grand Opera and Orchestra =

American non-profit opera company

The Connecticut Grand Opera and Orchestra was a non-profit, professional opera company and orchestra founded under that name in 1993 and based in Stamford, Connecticut, in the United States. By uniting several organizations (including the Connecticut Grand Opera in Bridgeport and the Stamford Chamber Orchestra) under general director and conductor Laurence Gilgore, the opera company and orchestra came together as one organization. The amalgamated company was often referred to as "CGO&O".

CGO&O was a member of OPERA America. It received critical praise from The New York Times, London's The Financial Times,, Opera News,, Opera magazine, and The New Yorker.

The company presented three fully staged operas each year. In August 1985, under General Manager John Hiddlestone, it became the third American opera company ever to have been invited to perform at the Edinburgh International Festival, presenting Menotti's The Consul.

Productions of the company spotlit such renowned artists as Marilyn Horne, Sherrill Milnes, Alessandra Marc, Peter Serkin, and Renée Fleming, as well as noted directors Arvin Brown and Tom O'Horgan.

According to Form 990 Tax forms, the company terminated non-profit activities in 2012.

== See also ==
- Connecticut Lyric Opera
