= Nicoline Zedeler =

Swedish-born American violinist (1889–1961)

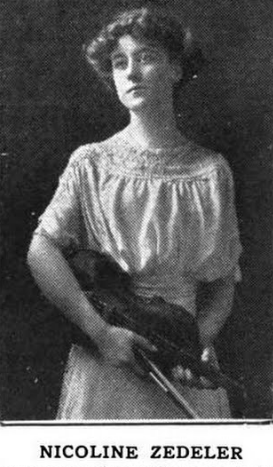
Nicoline Zedeler, from a 1912 publication.

Nicoline Zedeler (March 8, 1889 – March 26, 1961), later Nicoline Zedeler-Mix, was a Swedish-born American violinist who toured as a soloist with John Philip Sousa.

== Early life ==
Nicoline Florentine Zedeler was born in Stockholm in 1889 (some sources give 1892), and immigrated with her family to the American midwest when she was five years old. She played violin in performance from childhood. Her father, Franz Zedeler, taught violin at Bethany College in Kansas, and at Augustana College in Rock Island, Illinois. Her older brother Nicolai Franz Zedeler (1885–1966) was also a musician. Nicoline Zedeler studied music in Chicago, and with Theodore Spiering in Berlin. In their youth, she and her brother played with the Augustana Conservatory Orchestra, under their father's baton.

== Career ==
Zedeler toured the world as a featured soloist with the Sousa band, including concerts in Australia, and many in Europe and North America. The only other woman performer on the 1910–1911 Sousa world tour was the soprano soloist, Virginia Root. "There is a certain charm and intelligence in her playing which is very fascinating. I predict a great success for her," commented on Boston critic in 1912.

After she married, Nicoline Zedeler-Mix continued as a concert performer, and taught violin at the American Institute of Applied Music in New York City, on the same faculty with Theodore Spiering. She also taught at the Chicago Musical College and Chatham Square School of Music. In 1916, she was a featured soloist with Arthur Pryor's band at the Western Pennsylvania Exposition in Pittsburgh. With her husband, she founded the Thirteenth Sound Ensemble in 1927, and promoted the work of Mexican composer Julián Carrillo.

Among her students was Oscar Ravina, violinist with the New York Philharmonic.

== Personal life ==
Nicoline Zedeler married fellow Sousa tuba musician Emil Mix in 1912. They had four children: Theodore, Thomas, Virginia, and Nicoline. She was widowed in 1954, and died in 1961, in New York City, aged 72 years.
