= Gulfshore Opera =

Professional opera

Gulfshore Opera is a professional opera company based in Naples, Florida, presenting concerts and fully staged operas that tour throughout Collier, Lee and Charlotte Counties. It was founded in 2014 by Steffanie Pearce, who had previously founded and run Opera Naples (since 2006). The non-profit company is a member of Opera America.

In keeping with their mission, the company offers a variety of concert and education events throughout the season in addition to opera productions. The company also presents international artists, who have included Anthony Kearns as Nemorino in Donizetti's L'elisir d'amore, John Cudia in concert, and soprano Patricia Racette, who performed a concert of music from her album Diva on Detour.
