= List of Playboy Playmates of 1983 =

The following is a list of Playboy Playmates of 1983. Playboy magazine names their Playmate of the Month each month throughout the year.

== January ==
Lonny Chin

Personal details
- Born: 12 August 1960 (age 66) Liverpool, England
- Height: 5 ft 7 in (1.70 m)

Lonny Chin (born 12 August 1960 in Liverpool, England) is an English model and actress of Chinese, Jamaican, Welsh and Swedish descent. In addition to being Playboy magazine's Playmate of the Month for its January 1983 issue, Chin was the very first video Playmate featured by the magazine.

Chin also appeared with her sister Gail in a pictorial of Playmates and their sisters in the April 1985 issue.

== February ==
Melinda Mays

Personal details
- Born: February 23, 1962 (age 64) Augusta, Georgia, U.S.
- Height: 5 ft 4 in (1.63 m)

Melinda Mays (born February 23, 1962, in Augusta, Georgia) is an American model and actress. She was Playboy magazine's Playmate of the Month for its February 1983 issue. Her centerfold was photographed by Arny Freytag.

== March ==
Alana Soares

Personal details
- Born: February 21, 1964 (age 62) Redondo Beach, California, U.S.
- Height: 5 ft 2 in (1.57 m)

Alana Soares (born February 21, 1964) is an American model and actress. She was chosen as Playboy's Playmate of the Month in March 1983.

== April ==
Christina Ferguson

Personal details
- Born: March 18, 1964 (age 62) Phoenix, Arizona, U.S.
- Height: 5 ft 4 in (1.63 m)

Christina Ferguson (born March 18, 1964) is an American model. She was chosen as Playboy's Playmate of the Month in April, 1983.

== May ==
Susie Scott

Personal details
- Born: November 2, 1963 (age 62) San Diego, California, U.S.
- Height: 5 ft 5 in (1.65 m)

Susie Scott Krabacher (born November 2, 1963) is an American model, actress, and philanthropist. Under her maiden name of Susie Scott, she was Playboy magazine's Playmate of the Month for its May 1983 issue. Krabacher's autobiography, Angels of a Lower Flight, was released in October, 2007. She founded HaitiChildren, formerly Mercy and Sharing Foundation, a charitable organization focusing on Haiti and its children. In September 2019, it was announced that Theodore Christman and Donna Gay Anderson had written a dramatic musical, Unfolded, about Krabacher's life and work.

== June ==
Jolanda Egger

Personal details
- Born: 8 January 1960 (age 66) Luzern, Switzerland
- Height: 5 ft 8 in (1.73 m)

Jolanda Egger (born 8 January 1960 in Luzern, Switzerland) is a model and actress, chosen by Playboy as Playmate of the Month for June 1983. Occasionally she was credited as Yolanda Egger. Egger was the first Playmate of the Year for the Swiss edition of Playboy in 1984. Egger married race car driver Marc Surer in 1986; they divorced after seven years. She married Patrick Tavoli in 1997. This marriage also lasted seven years and she had two children with Tavoli. On her 50th birthday in 2010, she married hotel owner Jacques Risi.

== July ==
Ruth Guerri

Personal details
- Born: February 12, 1958 (age 68) St. Louis, Missouri, U.S.
- Height: 5 ft 5 in (1.65 m)

Ruth Guerri (born February 12, 1958, in St. Louis, Missouri) is an American model and actress of Italian descent. She was Playboy magazine's Playmate of the Month for its July 1983 issue. Her centerfold was photographed by Arny Freytag and Stephen Wayda. Guerri was working as a model in her home town, primarily for Anheuser-Busch, at the time she became a Playmate. According to the 1996 edition of The Playmate Book, she married and had two daughters; at that time the family was living in Missouri in a log cabin and owned an antique store.

== August ==
Carina Persson

Personal details
- Born: 14 June 1958 (age 68) Stockholm, Sweden
- Height: 5 ft 3 in (1.60 m)

Carina Persson (born 14 June 1958 in Stockholm, Sweden) is a Swedish model. She was Playboy magazine's Playmate of the Month for its August 1983 issue. Her centerfold was photographed by Ken Marcus. Carina was also an extra in the movie "Into the Night" with Michelle Pfeiffer and Jeff Goldblum.

== September ==
Barbara Edwards

Playboy Playmate of the Year
- 1984
- Preceded by: Marianne Gravatte
- Succeeded by: Karen Velez

Personal details
- Born: June 26, 1960 (age 66) Albuquerque, New Mexico, U.S.
- Height: 5 ft 5 in (1.65 m)

Barbara L. Edwards (born June 26, 1960, in Albuquerque, New Mexico) is an American model and actress. She was Playmate of the Month for September 1983 and Playmate of the Year for 1984.

== October ==
Tracy Vaccaro

Personal details
- Born: May 4, 1962 (age 64) Glendale, California, U.S.
- Height: 5 ft 8 in (1.73 m)

Tracy Vaccaro (born May 4, 1962, in Glendale, California) is an American model and actress. She was Playboy magazine's Playmate of the Month for its October 1983 issue. Her centerfold was photographed by Arny Freytag. Vaccaro was married to American football player and actor Fred Dryer. They split up in 1986, but they divorced in 1988, after a 5-year marriage. Dwyer and Vaccaro have one daughter, Caitlin Nell Dryer, who was born on April 12, 1984. According to them, they broke up mostly because of Fred Dryer's long work days on TV series Hunter (1984). After the divorce, Vaccaro remarried and moved to Las Vegas with Caitlin and her new husband. In 1989, she gave birth to another child.

== November ==
Veronica Gamba

Personal details
- Born: 28 October 1963 (age 62) Buenos Aires, Argentina
- Height: 5 ft 8 in (1.73 m)

Verónica Gamba (born 28 October 1963) is an Argentinian model and actress. Gamba was born in Buenos Aires. She was Playboy magazine's Playmate of the Month for its November 1983 issue. Her centerfold was photographed by Arny Freytag.

== December ==
Terry Nihen

Personal details
- Born: September 17, 1960 (age 65) Concord, Massachusetts, U.S.
- Height: 5 ft 6 in (1.68 m)

Terry Nihen (born September 17, 1960) is an American model from Acton, Massachusetts. She was chosen as Playboy's Playmate of the Month in December, 1983. Her centerfold was photographed by Richard Fegley.

== See also ==
- List of people in Playboy 1980–1989

Lonny Chin	Melinda Mays	Alana Soares	Christina Ferguson	Susie Scott Krabacher	Jolanda Egger
Ruth Guerri	Carina Persson	Barbara L. Edwards	Tracy Vaccaro	Verónica Gamba	Terry Nihen
