= Paramount Theater (Charlottesville, Virginia) =

Theater and movie theater in Charlottesville, Virginia, United States

Coordinates: 38.030881°N 78.479918°W

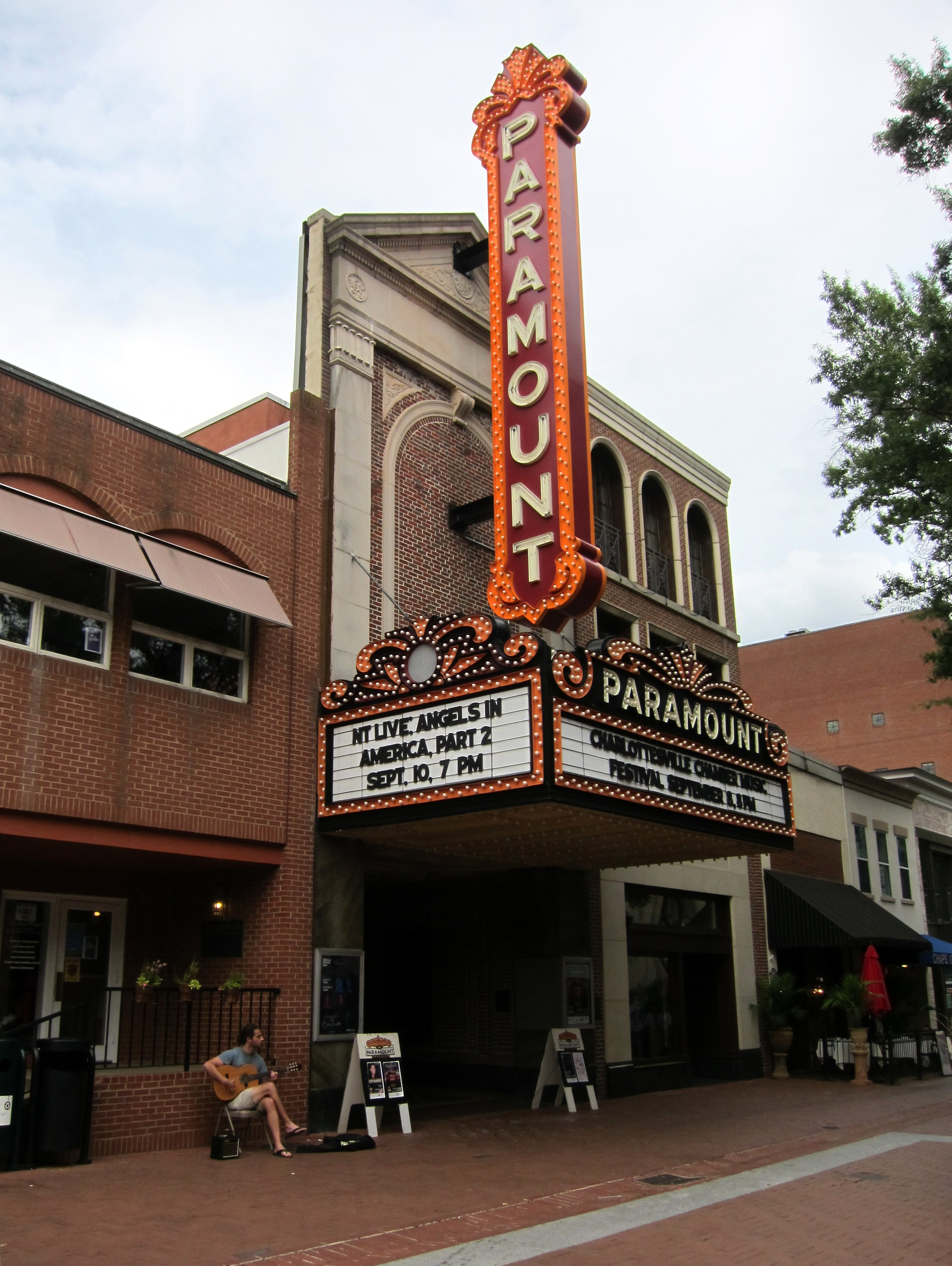
- Paramount Theater in 2017
- Interactive map of Paramount Theater
- Address: 215 East Main Street; Charlottesville, Virginia; United States
- Owner: The Paramount Theater of Charlottesville, Inc.
- Capacity: 1,100

Construction
- Opened: 1931
- Architect: Rapp & Rapp

Website
- www.theparamount.net

The Paramount Theater in Charlottesville, Virginia, United States, was designed by Rapp and Rapp and opened in 1931 as a movie theater. The Paramount continued showing movies until it closed in 1974. In 1990, a group of community members purchased the theater, formed a non-profit corporation, and began raising funds for its restoration and expansion. In late 2004, the Paramount re-opened after an $18 million renovation. It is operated by a non-profit organization and is a performing arts venue.

Beginning in 2009, the theater has played host to performances by the Charlottesville Opera.
