= Theodore Christman =

American composer

Theodore Christman is an American composer of classical music. He is most noted for his operas and other vocal music.

His first operas, A Special Secret Someone and The Dreamer, were premiered in 2015. In 2016, he founded the Christman Opera Company. The company's inaugural performance took place at Opera America's National Opera Center in 2016 and featured a double bill of Dido and Aeneas and Christman's third opera, Adriana McMannes. His fourth opera, A Metamorphosis, was premiered by the COC in 2018. OperaWire named this performance one of the “Top 5 Operas to See” in North America. In 2019, it was announced that Christman and librettist Donna Gay Anderson had written a dramatic musical, Unfolded, about the life and work of Susie Scott Krabacher. In October 2019, selections from the musical were premiered in a benefit concert for Krabacher's humanitarian organization, HaitiChildren. During the COVID-19 pandemic, COC's virtual benefit concert for HaitiChildren featured premieres of music by Christman and Paula Kimper, performed by mezzo-soprano Madison Marie McIntosh and pianist Gregory Ritchey. COC also launched the series Voices Raising Voices, which featured virtual performances of vocal works by composers such as Mira J. Spektor, Gladys Smuckler Moskowitz, Jerrell R. Gray, Sonia Megías, and Greg Bartholomew.

In January 2021, COC presented a virtual performance of Christman's opera The Impresario and the Dueling Divas, with pianist Eve Queler. On May 7 of the same year, COC hosted a virtual concert to benefit The American Prize, in which 2020 TAP winner Madison Marie McIntosh and Gregory Ritchey premiered works by Theodore Christman, Antonio Covello, Ted Ganger, Michael J. Polo, Kevin Scott, Amy Scurria, Myron Silberstein, and Webster Young.
