= Margaret Wolfson =

American branding executive and writer

- Born: Detroit, Michigan
- Education: Indiana University; New York University (MA)
- Occupations: Branding executive; Entrepreneur; Performance artist; Writer
- Years active: 1983 - Present
- Title: Founder and chief creative officer River and Wolf
- Website: riverandwolf.com

Margaret Wolfson is an American branding executive, entrepreneur, and writer. The founder and chief creative officer of River and Wolf, a New York-based branding and brand naming agency, Wolfson began her career as a storyteller and performance artist.

== Education ==
Wolfson was born to Esther (Evans) Wolfson and Lester Wolfson, a professor of literature who in 1969 became the first chancellor of Indiana University South Bend. She received a bachelor's degree from Indiana University's Independent Study Program, where she studied with poet Mary Ellen Solt and an M.A. from New York University's Gallatin School of Individualized Study with a focus on literature and communication arts.

== Career ==
=== 1982-2014: Performance ===
In the 1980s Wolfson founded Fire Plume Theater, a storytelling and music ensemble; a review in the Los Angeles Times described a 1989 performance as "dark and strange and brushed with eloquent melancholy" with Wolfson "creating images with words, silence and graceful body movements." Later known as World Myth and Music, the ensemble toured throughout North America, Europe, and Asia with flutist Paula Chan Bing and other musicians, appearing at venues including the Sydney Opera House, the National Theatre, the United Nations, and the Brooklyn Academy of Music in addition to museums and universities worldwide.

In 1999, Wolfson collaborated with composer Michael Ching to create Psyche and Eros, which premiered with the San Jose Chamber Orchestra in 2000. A later version of the work was performed at the Abu Dhabi Festival and the Lincoln Center Summer Institute program in West Memphis. Wolfson also collaborated with composer/musician Simon Shaheen on two theatrical events: Majnun Layla in 1989 and The Epic of Gilgamesh in 2011. Majnun Layla premiered at the Kennedy Center's Terrace Theater.

=== 1996-2011: Workshops and writing ===
Between 1996 and 2001, Wolfson wrote four illustrated books based on folklore and myths, including Marriage of the Rain Goddess: A South African Myth. "A flowing, incantatory text, inspired by a fragment of a Zulu myth, is encrusted with poetic epithets," it was published by Barefoot Books in 1996. Danish, Korean, and Swedish translations were later published. The Patient Stone: A Persian Love Story, released in 2001, was also published by Barefoot Books.'

Wolfson held storytelling residences and led workshops in the US as well as in the United Arab Emirates. She was a consultant for The Bushnell Center for the Performing Arts, and the director of the Myth Project at CalArts.

=== 2008-present: Naming, River and Wolf ===
Although she continued to perform, Wolfson became a brand naming and creative consultant for the naming agency Namebase in 2008; the New York Times noted that she "split her time between naming and performing one-woman shows around the world in which she recites classical myths." In 2014, she founded her own naming agency, River and Wolf. She has since created brand names for companies including Calvin Klein, Maison Ferrand, Micro Medical Instruments, Philips and Samsung and developed product names for the technology, financial services, entertainment, food and beverage and consumer packaged goods industries. In 2021, she launched Names of Distinction, a digital gallery that highlights brand names and offers naming tips and techniques.

Wolfson has been interviewed on subjects related to branding, marketing, and naming for publications including AdAge, New York Magazine, and the Wall Street Journal. She has written about brand naming for consumer and trade publications,including The Drum and Fast Company.

== Bibliography ==
- The Turtle Tattoo: Timeless Tales for Finding and Fulfilling Your Dreams; Nataraj Publications, January 1996 ISBN 9781882591282
- Marriage of the Rain Goddess: A South African Myth; illustrations by Clifford Alexander Parms; Barefoot Books; January 1999; ISBN 9781841481005
- Turtle Songs: A Tale for Mothers and Daughters; illustrations by Karla Sachi; Beyond Words Publishing Company, January 1999; ISBN 9781885223951
- The Patient Stone: A Persian Love Story; illustrations by Juan Caneba Clavero; Barefoot Books; January 2001; ISBN 9781841480855
