= Miami Lyric Opera =

Opera company

Miami Lyric Opera (MLO) was an opera company in Miami-Dade County, Florida, United States. The company was founded by the Italian tenor Raffaele Cardone, establishing itself as a non-profit organization in 2004. It attempted to take advantage of a small niche market for opera in the region.

After having an inaugural concert of arias in October 2004, the company "presented its first fully staged production" in April 2005, with a performance of La traviata by Giuseppe Verdi. This was followed by an August performance of Cavalleria Rusticana by Pietro Mascagni.

Performances of the company are held at the Olympia Theater at the Gusman Center for the Performing Arts. The theater also applies grant funds towards underwriting the performances of the opera company.

In April 2024, Cardone announced that the company was shutting down. "The principal reason is financing— not enough being available to make a decent production. Venue, labor, musicians and artist costs and others, have all increased". The company's final performance was a double bill of Mascagni's Cavalleria Rusticana and Suor Angelica by Giacomo Puccini.
