= Opera North (U.S.A.) =

- Formation: 1981
- Founder: David Strohmier
- Type: opera company
- Location: Lebanon, New Hampshire
- Artistic director: Louis Burkot
- Website: operanorthnh.org
- Formerly called: Light Opera of Norwich

Opera North is an American opera company based in Lebanon, New Hampshire, and is the region's oldest professional opera company. The company presents an annual summer season of three fully staged and orchestrated productions: a traditional opera, a piece of classical music theater, and an American opera. Opera North productions are staged at the Lebanon Opera House. Opera North is a member of Opera America.

== History ==
Opera North was founded as the Light Opera of Norwich in 1981 as an offshoot of the Parish Players, a community theater in Thetford, Vermont, by David Strohmier. At this time the company was merely a non-profit community theater organization. Under Strohmier's leadership the company focused mostly on light opera and operettas with a particular focus on the works of Gilbert and Sullivan. Strohmier worked closely with Louis Burkot, the then director of the Dartmouth Glee Club. After Strohmier's departure in 1987, Burkot became artistic director of the company and began moving Opera North towards a more serious operatic repertoire.

The 1988 Opera North hired producer Flo Klausner and opera director Ron Luchsinger for the company's production of Gilbert and Sullivan's Iolanthe. Since then Klausner has served as executive producer for many of Opera North's productions, and Luchsinger became Director of Productions for the company. Klausner and Luchsinger were involved in changing Opera North into a professional regional opera company. In 1996, Opera North hired executive director Patricia Compton and officially became a professional opera company. Compton stayed with the company until 2006 when Risa Bridges-Hall joined Opera North as the first full-time executive director of the company. In 2009, former opera soprano Pamela A. Pantos became the second full-time executive director of the company. During her six years with the company, Pantos put the company on more solid financial footing and implemented a strategic plan that increased ticket sales by an average of 15% over the last three seasons. In 2011, the company was devastated by Hurricane Irene, and Pantos worked with the Board of Directors to secure donations to cover the enormous resulting loss of costuming and props. Pantos was named one of New Hampshire's four Outstanding Women in Business for 2014 by New Hampshire Business Review.

The 2014 Opera North Summer Festival included the production of Giuseppe Verdi's La traviata, Lerner and Loewe's My Fair Lady, and Kurt Weill's Street Scene.
