= Bel Cantanti Opera =

Bel Cantanti
- Formation: 2003
- Type: Opera company
- Location: Washington metropolitan area
- Artistic director: Katerina Souvorova
- Website: www.belcantanti.com

Bel Cantanti is an American opera company under the direction of Dr. Katerina Souvorova. It was formed in 2003 to give performance opportunities to operatic talent in the Washington, D.C. area. It has produced more than 50 different fully staged operas and gala events with young professionals since 2003. The productions has been in a variety of venues including: the Austrian Embassy in D.C., the French Embassy in Georgetown, and the German Embassy in D.C.. Bel Cantanti performed at the Randolph Theater in Silver Spring, Maryland, located in a Montgomery County, Maryland community center, until the County closed the center in favor of an affordable housing project. Most performances are now held at the Bender Jewish Community Center in Rockville, Maryland.

== Productions ==
In December 2003, Bel Cantanti held its first fully–staged opera production, Menotti's Amahl and the Night Visitors, at St. James Episcopal Church in Leesburg, Virginia. Bel Cantanti has had continued success with its productions of : Donizetti's L'elisir d'Amore, Verdi's Rigoletto, Menotti's Amahl and the Night Visitors, Tchaikovsky's Eugene Onegin, Rossini's Il barbiere di Siviglia, Donizetti's La fille du régiment, Humperdinck's Hänsel und Gretel, Rachmaninoff's Aleko, Tchaikovsky's Iolanta, Mozart's Le nozze di Figaro, and Donizetti's Lucia di Lammermoor. The company's 2007–2008 season produced fully staged versions of Mozart's Die Entführung aus dem Serail (The Abduction from the Seraglio, performed in German, March 2008) and G. Puccini's birth with an abridged version of La bohème. In December 2007 Bel Cantanti is performing a concert version of Humperdinck's Hänsel und Gretel.

In December 2025, "The Snow Queen" a Fairy Tale Family Musical by H. C. Andersen. Storyteller: Peter Burroughs, Grandmother: Mizuho Takeshita, Melissa Chavez, The Snow Queen: Hannah Wardell, Griselda: Valerie Filloux, Cindy Harris Elkins, The King: Michael Nansel, The Arctic Bird: Leigh Wirth Dencker. Villagers, Snowflakes, Flowers, Arctic Birds, Robbers, Bel Cantanti Children's Studio, The Four Season Dancers.

Choreographer, Elena Indrokova Jones. Play Writer: Jane Barbara. Music and artistic director, pianist: Katerina Souvorova

== Reviews ==
Bel Cantanti and its young performers, coached by Katerina Souvorova, have garnered excellent reviews over the years in The Washington Post, The Washington Times, Ionarts.blogspot.com, and other local papers.
