= Opera Wyoming =

Opera company

Opera Wyoming is the first opera company in Wyoming, United States. It was established in 2018 by Emily and Daniel Quintana.

Both performances were held in Casper, Wyoming; the first performance was on October 12, 2018, and the second one on January 25, 2019. In January 2020, the opera company was officially recognized as the state opera company of Wyoming.
