= María de Buenos Aires =

20th C. tango opera by Astor Piazzolla

- Operetta by Astor Piazzolla
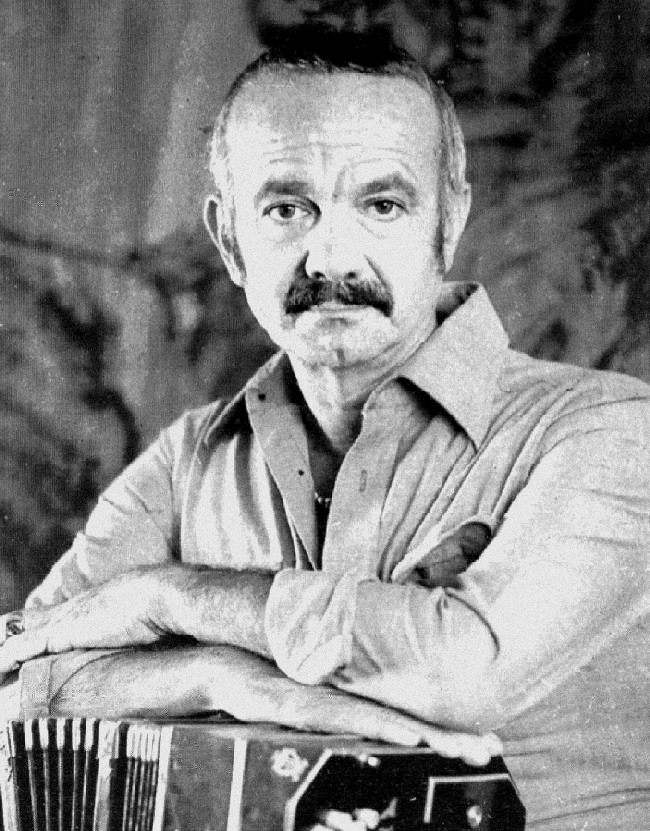
- Piazzolla in 1971
- Librettist: Horacio Ferrer
- Language: Spanish
- Premiere: 8 May 1968; Sala Planeta, Buenos Aires

María de Buenos Aires is a tango opera (tango operita) with music by Astor Piazzolla and libretto by Horacio Ferrer that premiered at the Sala Planeta in Buenos Aires on 8 May 1968.

The first part of the surreal plot centers on the experiences of a prostitute in Buenos Aires, Argentina; the second part takes place after her death. The characters include María (and, after her death, the Shadow of María), a singer of payadas; various members of the Buenos Aires underworld; a payador who functions as a poet and narrator; a goblin-like duende; several marionettes under the control of the duende; a circus of psychoanalysts; pasta makers; and construction workers. Many elements of the libretto suggest parallels between María and Mary, the mother of Jesus (in Spanish, María) or Jesus himself.

While certainly not in the narrow sense an opera ballet, because the dance is tango rather than classical ballet, it falls within the tradition of having set dance pieces integral to an operatic work.

The music draws on the nuevo tango idiom for which Piazzolla is famous. The original idea for the story was conceived by Piazzolla's lover at the time of its composition, Egle Martin, who was married to Eduardo "Lalo" Palacios. The title role was originally conceived for Martin, but while Piazzolla was still composing the operita, he and Martin broke up after he asked her husband for her hand at Christmas in 1967. According to Martin, Piazzolla said to Lalo, "She is music, she can't belong to anybody, no she is music, she is music, and that's me." After their rift, a replacement was desperately needed, but Piazzolla soon met folksinger Amelita Baltar at the Buenos Aires nightclub Nuestro Tiempo, formerly known as "676" and once Piazzolla's home base in Argentina. Baltar's identification with the character María, paired with her beauty and captivating stage presence, made her ideal for the role.

The piece is written for at least three vocalists (one of whom, the narrator, mainly speaks rather than sings). For the orchestration Piazzolla augmented his current working quintet: Piazzolla (bandoneón), Antonio Agri (violin), Jamie "El Russo" Gosis (piano), Oscar Lopez Ruiz (guitar) and Kicho Díaz (double bass); with viola, cello, flute, percussion, vibraphone and xylophone, and a second guitar. María de Buenos Aires has often been performed with dancers as well as musicians. There are several extant arrangements, including Piazzolla's own and one by Pablo Ziegler.

== Performance history ==
For some years, María de Buenos Aires was seldom staged, though increasingly there have been modern productions, some in concert form and often incorporating dance. The opera had its United States premiere at Houston Grand Opera in 1991. The Pan American Symphony Orchestra, based in Washington, D.C. and led by Argentine conductor Sergio Buslje, premiered the work in Washington, D.C., in September 1996 and performed it again in March 2001. (Washington Post, September 19, 1996; Washington Post, March 19, 2001). The United Kingdom premiere took place on 2 June 2000 as part of the BOC Covent Garden Festival at the Peacock Theatre, London. A semi-staged performance at the Grand Thermae Villa in Rome in 2003 was recorded and has been released on DVD by Kultur Video.

In 2004, John Abulafia created a fully staged dance-theatre production of Maria de Buenos Aires, set close to the time it was composed - Argentina's 'Dirty War'. Maria, danced and sung by Julieta Anahi Frias, was one of the many who were 'disappeared' by the Military Junta. The production toured to UK's Bath Theatre Royal, Buxton Opera House and Norwich Theatre Royal. Theater de la Jeune Lune in Minneapolis, Minnesota (2005), the Teatro Nacional de São João (Porto) and the Opera São Carlos (Lisbon) in Portugal (2006, 2007, toured Norway in 2007), the Gotham Chamber Opera at Skirball Center, in New York City (2008), Canberra, Australia (National Multicultural Festival, 2008) and the very successful Teatro di Capua production (2008) which has been produced in several theatres including the Hermitage Theatre in St Petersburg, Russia, Moscow (where it received two nominations in the Moscow Festival of the Golden Mask in 2009), and the 2010 Edinburgh Festival.

A new fully staged production by Australian dance company Leigh Warren and Dancers and the State Opera of South Australia opened in Adelaide on 15 October 2010 and performed at the Brisbane Festival in September 2011. A reworked version of this production featured in the Victorian Opera 2013 season in Melbourne, as a collaboration between Leigh Warren and Dancers and the Victorian Opera performed at Melbourne Recital Centre. It was directed once more by Leigh Warren, with conductor James Crabb, and music supervision by Argentinian born pianist Andrea Katz. The production featured Cherie Boogaart as Maria, Nicholas Dinopoulos as the Cantor, Alirio Zavarce as the Narrator, and additionally showcased cameos from tango dancer Andrew Gill, magician James James and contortionist Jacinta Rohan.

A new production by Quantum Theatre in Pittsburgh, PA, with musical direction by Andres Cladera, stage direction by Karla Boos, and bandoneonist Ben Bogart opened on 24 March 2011.

The opera was translated to Swedish by Leif Janzon and premiered by the Piteå Chamber Opera on 15 October 2011 at Acusticum in Piteå (Sweden).

A new fully staged production by Vatroslav Lisinski Concert Hall, Zagreb, Croatia, was premiered on 22 October 2011. The performance was directed by Mario Kovač, with The Zagreb Soloists under direction of Miran Vaupotić, and Chamber Choir "Ivan Filipović" under direction of Goran Jerković. Bandoneón was played by Aleksandar Nikolić, the recipient of Astor Piazzolla Award in 2008. The circus acts were performed by the circus company Circorama. The singers were Sandra Rumolino, Jorge Rodriguez and José Luis Baretto.

The Long Beach Opera performed the work on 29 January and 4 February 2012 at the Warner Grand Theater in San Pedro, California, in a production created by the company's artistic director Andreas Mitisek that set the opera in Buenos Aires after the Dirty War of the 1970s and 1980s; María and the Payador were people who "disappeared"; he survives and as an old man recalls their days together. The production was reviewed in the Los Angeles Times.

Artes de la Rosa Cultural Center for the Arts in Fort Worth, Texas, presented María de Buenos Aires on 11 May 2012 directed by Adam Adolfo, with Elise Lavallee as choreographer and Josh Bradford as music director. It was staged at the historic Rose Marine Theater. Starring as María, was Grace Neeley making her Artes de laRosa debut. The actress has been seen throughout the North Texas theatre community taking the stage at Circle Theatre. Keith J. Warren sang the lyric tenor role of María's love interest, El Payador, with J.P. Cano in the role of the Goblin Ghost Storyteller, El Duende.

The Cincinnati Opera staged the piece on 25 and 27 July 2012 with soprano Catalina Cuervo, baritone Luis Alejandro Orozco, and Jairo Cuesta as El Payador. The director was Jose Maria Condemi, and Tony Award winning dancers Fernanda Ghi and Guillermo Merlo, as well as bandoneón player Ben Bogart performed.

The Lexington Philharmonic Orchestra presented María between 1 and 3 February 2013 with New York-based Argentinean mezzo-soprano Solange Merdinian and baritone Luis Orozco. The narrator was Enrique Andrade and the production was directed by John de los Santos. Bandoneon player Ben Bogart also performed. In March 2013, Opera Hispanica presented it at Le Poisson Rouge in New York City, Argentinean mezzo-soprano Solange Merdinian as Maria and Uruguayan Baritone Marcelo Guzzo, Jorge Parodi conducted the production.

The Alaska Center for the Performing Arts presented María de Buenos Aires in Anchorage between 21 and 24, January 2016. The conductor was Kinney Frost, with choreographer/director Adam Cates. The main roles were María (soprano Catalina Cuervo), El Duende (baritone Milton Loayza), El Payador (baritone Luis Orozco). The bandoneón artist was David Alsina.

Opera Naples presented María de Buenos Aires in March 2015, with mezzo-soprano Malena Dayen, a Buenos Aires native, as María, baritone Luis Orozco, tenor Martín Nussbaum and bandoneón player David Alsina. Spanish conductor Ramon Tebar led the production that was directed by Antonio Salatino and choreographed by Argentinian tango dancer Pablo Repun. In 2019 Dayen starred and directed a site specific production of the work for Bare Opera in New York City, conducted by David Rosenmeyer and choreographed by Troy Ogilvie using interactive projections created by Sangmin Chae.

Brown Opera Productions mounted the North American première production of the 1986 Tourcoing version in Providence, Rhode Island, between 13 and 15 March 2015, with stage direction by Alejandro J. García Morales, and musical direction by Eleanor Siden and Sami Overby. The expanded cast included mezzo-soprano Mariami Bekauri in the title role, Madeleine Slater as Mimí/Marioneta I, Liliana Luna-Nelson as Helga/Sombra Superiora, Morayo Akande as Zazá/Medium, Noah Lubin as Duende, Jacob Mukand as Tito, Jacob Laden-Guindon as Gato/Analista I. The choreography was devised by Jonathan Adam, with Stanley Muñoz, Anjali Carroll, and Aida Palma in principal dance roles.

The Atlanta Opera created an immersive new production in February 2017, directed by Artistic Director Tomer Zvulun and starring Catalina Cuervo and Luis Orozco. The success of that production led to a remount that opened The New Orleans opera 2017–2018 season. In the following year, the same production led by Zvulun and starring Cuervo and Orozco opened the New York City Opera season, in an immersive performance at Le Poisson Rouge in NYC. The production then returned in March 2019 to Atlanta where it was remounted in a sold-out run, with a different cast that included Solange Merdinian and Gustavo Feuillen. On 7 and 13 July 2017, the Des Moines Metro Opera presented María with a cast that included Elise Quagliata as María, Ricardo Rivera as El Payador, and Rodolfo Nieto as El Duende. The stage director was Octavio Cardenas. The production was highlighted in Opera Today.

The Mill City Summer Opera presented María between 14 and 20 July 2017 in Minneapolis with Catalina Cuervo as María, Luis Alejandro Orozco as El Payador, and Milton Loayza as El Duende. The production was directed by David Lefkowich and choreographed by Fernanda Ghi. The bandoneón artist was Juan Pablo Jofre.

The Pan American Symphony Orchestra will present the work for the third time on September 16, 2017, at the George Washington University's Lisner Auditorium with an all-Argentine cast, featuring Mariana Quinteros as María, Hugo Medrano as El Duende, Martin de Leon as El Payador and Gorrion and Rodolfo Zanetti on bandoneón.

Pensacola Opera will present "María" on November 10 and 12, 2017, as part of Pensacola's Foo Foo Festival. The cast features the company's 2017-18 Artists in Residence: Evelyn Saavedra, Camille Sherman, Eric Dean Wassenaar, and Brent Hetherington. It will be conducted by Cody Martin, with stage direction by Octavio Cardenas and choreography by Richard Steinert. David Alsina will be on bandoneón.

Nashville Opera performed the work at the Noah Liff Opera Center from Nov 10–12, 2017. The production featured Cassandra Zoe Velasco as Maria, Luis Alejandro Orozco as El Payador, and Luis Ledesma as El Duende. For the production the performance hall was turned into an exotic tango lounge with tables and chairs.

To this date, Colombian opera singer Catalina Cuervo holds the distinction of having participated in the most performances of "María de Buenos Aires." Ms. Cuervo has performed the role of María for numerous prestigious companies, including the Milwaukee Opera (2011), Cincinnati Opera (2012), Florida Grand Opera (2013), Syracuse Opera (2014), Anchorage Opera (2016), Opera Grand Rapids (2016), Atlanta Opera (2017), Mill City Summer Opera (2017), and others.

In March 2025, the work was recreated in its integral version at La Cité Bleue in Geneva by bandoneonist William Sabatier, with the 18 original tableaux reconstructed from a previously unpublished live recording from 1968. This restoration brings back the complete dramaturgical form envisioned by Piazzolla and Ferrer. This historic reconstruction, praised by critics, marks a turning point in the contemporary reception of the operita. For the first time since 1968, audiences can experience the work in its full musical, poetic, and symbolic integrity. It is now regarded as a cornerstone of modern staged tango.

== Synopsis ==
The ill-omened María, born "one day when God was drunk" in a poor suburb of Buenos Aires, heads to the center of Buenos Aires, where she is seduced by the music of the tango and becomes a sex worker. Thieves and brothel keepers, gathered at a black mass, resolve her death. After her death, she is condemned to a hell, which is the city itself; her Shadow now walks the city. She has returned to virginity, is impregnated by the word of the goblin poet, and—witnessed by three Construction Workers (Magi) and The Women Who Knead Pasta—gives birth to a Child María, who may be herself.

== Musical numbers ==
- Alevare
- Tema de María
- Balada para un organito loco
- Yo soy María
- Milonga carrieguera por María la niña
- Fuga y misterio
- Poema valseado
- Tocata rea
- Miserere canyengue de los ladrones antiguos en las alcantarillas
- Contramilonga a la funerala por la primera muerte de María
- Tangata del alba
- Carta a los árboles y las chimeneas
- Aria de los analistas
- Romanza del duende poeta y curda
- Allegro tangabile
- Milonga de la anunciación
- Tangus Dei
