= Raffaele Cardone =

Italian opera singer

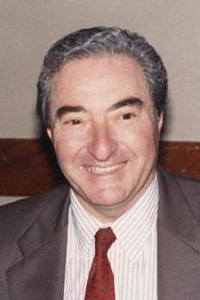
- Born: 17 January 1935 (age 90); Bari, Italy
- Occupations: Opera singer (tenor); Singing teacher
- Years active: 1953 – present

Raffaele Cardone (born 1934) is an Italian-born operatic tenor and the founder and artistic director of Miami Lyric Opera.

== Life and career ==
Raffaele Cardone, husband, father, and grandfather currently lives in Florida with his wife, Theresa Cardone.

Cardone began his musical and vocal studies in his native Bari while singing at local churches as a child soloist. As a teenager he took voice lessons with Giuseppe Racalbuto and soprano Delia Sanzio Montesanto until he was accepted as student by Carlo Tagliabue.

He made his operatic debut at the age of nineteen at the Teatro El Círculo in Rosario, Argentina, as the Duke of Mantua in Rigoletto. He then sang in Uruguay before returning to Italy where he continued his studies with Tagliabue and appeared in several provincial opera houses. Cardone had an active international career in concert and on the opera stage throughout the 1960s, including his role debut as Arturo in I puritani at the Teatro Avenida in Buenos Aires in 1961. His career was interrupted by heart surgery in 1971. After his recovery, he sang for several seasons at the Teatro de Bellas Artes in Mexico City. In 2020 Mr. Cardone was awarded by the President of the Italy, Sergio Mattarella as "Ufficiale della Stella D'Italia" for his achievements in promoting the Arts and the opera Internationally. <public references, or searchers Google, Bin, etc.> Following his retirement from the stage, Cardone devoted himself to teaching singing, first in Mexico and later in Florida, where he settled in 2002. In 2004 he founded the Miami Lyric Opera.
