= Grétry (disambiguation) =

People with the surname Grétry include:

- André Grétry (1741–1813), composer of opéras comiques
- Jeanne-Marie Grandon Grétry (1746–1807), painter, wife of André
- Lucile Grétry (1772–1790), composer, daughter of André and Jeanne-Marie
