= The Gilbert and Sullivan Light Opera Company of Long Island =

American performing group

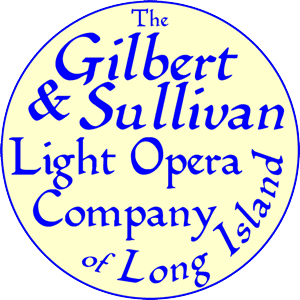

The Gilbert and Sullivan Light Opera Company of Long Island is a non-profit performing group that has produced mostly the works of Gilbert and Sullivan since 1954. The company is based in Long Island, New York. A spin-off of the group is the Gilbert & Sullivan Yiddish Light Opera Company, which performs Yiddish translations of several of the Gilbert and Sullivan operas.

== History ==
The Gilbert and Sullivan Light Opera Company of Long Island was founded in 1954. The founders included Sally Buckstone and Norman Buddy Packer. It started as an adult education course on Gilbert and Sullivan at Merrick High School in 1953, and its first production was The Mikado in 1954. Early on the group was named Gilbert & Sullivan Workshop of Long Island. Since then it has performed all of the Gilbert and Sullivan operas and various related works around Long Island and beyond, and in 1980 it adopted its current name.

The Yiddish division of the Company, Gilbert & Sullivan Yiddish Light Opera Company, launched in 1984. Initially a novelty fund-raiser, Der Shirtz (a 30-minute Yiddish version of H.M.S. Pinafore), this company split off into its own organization. Under the leadership of longtime Company stalwarts Al Grand, Bob Tartell and Elaine Lerner, and directed by Sally Buckstone, what eventually became the Gilbert & Sullivan Yiddish Light Opera Company of Long Island developed Der Yiddisher Pinafore, Di Yam Gazlonim (The Pirates of Penzance) and Der Yiddisher Mikado, Yiddish versions of the most popular Savoy operas. The group's productions melded Victorian satire with Jewish humor. Jewish experiences and idioms were woven into the original plots, replacing Britishisms with Yiddishisms. All three adaptations played to sold-out audiences all over the United States, Canada and in London, England.
