= Opera Theatre of Lucca =

The Opera Theatre of Lucca is an opera and music school and summer music festival in Lucca, Italy. Founded in 1996 by the late American opera singer and voice teacher Lorenzo Malfatti and British opera director Malcolm Fraser, it is jointly sponsored by the City of Lucca and the University of Cincinnati College-Conservatory of Music. Opera performances and recitals take place in the cloisters, churches, piazzas in and around Lucca as well as in the city's Teatro del Giglio.
