= Jack Everly =

American conductor (born 1952)

- Born: 1952 (age 73–74); Richmond, Indiana
- Education: Indiana University
- Occupation: Conductor
- Awards: Indiana Historical Society Living Legends Award; 2015; Sagamore of the Wabash; 2023

Jack Everly (born January 13, 1952) is an American conductor who serves as Principal Pops Conductor with the Indianapolis Symphony Orchestra, Naples Philharmonic and the National Arts Centre Orchestra (Ottawa, Canada).

Born in Richmond, Indiana, Everly appears as guest conductor with orchestras throughout North America and is a former conductor of the American Ballet Theatre.

== Career ==
Jack Everly graduated from the Jacobs School of Music at Indiana University where he studied music and set design. He is the Principal Pops Conductor of the Indianapolis Symphony Orchestra, Naples Philharmonic and the National Arts Centre Orchestra (Ottawa). He has conducted the Los Angeles Philharmonic at the Hollywood Bowl, The New York Pops at Carnegie Hall and made appearances with The Cleveland Orchestra at Blossom Music Center.

Everly is the also music director of the IPL Yuletide Celebration. He led the ISO in its first Pops recording, Yuletide Celebration, Volume One, that included three of his own orchestrations

Originally appointed by Mikhail Baryshnikov, Everly was conductor of the American Ballet Theatre for 14 years, where he served as music director. In addition to his ABT tenure, he teamed with Marvin Hamlisch on Broadway shows that Hamlisch scored.

Everly is a recipient of the 2015 Indiana Historical Society Living Legends Award. In May 2009 he received an Honorary Doctorate of Arts from Franklin College in his home state of Indiana. Maestro Everly was awarded the Sagamore of the Wabash in 2023.

From the Capitol Building lawn, Everly has conducted the National Symphony Orchestra in the National Memorial Day Concert and A Capitol Fourth since 2010, in concerts televised nationwide on PBS.

He lives in Indianapolis.
