= Salt Marsh Opera =

- Origin: Stonington, Connecticut, USA
- Years active: 2000–present
- Members: Simon Holt
- Website: saltmarshopera.org

Salt Marsh Opera is a U.S. non-profit opera company that performs across southern Connecticut and Rhode Island. Founded in 2000 and based in Stonington, Connecticut, Salt Marsh Opera has offered productions of Madama Butterfly, Tosca, Cosi fan tutte, The Mikado, La bohème, La traviata, Il barbiere di Siviglia, and Lucia di Lammermoor. It also stages full-dress rehearsals and hosts lectures and soirees to expand public appreciation of opera.
