= Chelsea Opera =

Opera company in New York City

Chelsea Opera is an opera company located in New York City, founded in April 2004 by Leonarda Priore and Lynne Hayden-Findlay, both singers, who sought to create more performance opportunities with chamber orchestra within the tri-state areas of New York, New Jersey, and Connecticut. Initially the company's musical direction was provided by conductor Carmine Aufiero.

The company's range of performances includes many from the "standard repertoire", but now modern works such as the November 2010 production of Tom Cipullo’s Glory Denied, based on the oral biography of Tom Philpott, which garnered an outstanding review from Allan Kozinn in The New York Times and Opera News as well as This is the rill speaking and vocal chamber piece, Bermudas. Both celebrated the 85th birthday of American composer Lee Hoiby. More recently, in November 2012, the company presented the world premiere of The Mark of Cain by Matthew Harris and Terry Quinn. The Manhattan premiere of A Distant Love: Songs of John and Abigail Adams by Gary Fagin and Terry Quinn followed in June 2013. The New York premiere of Richard Wargo's one-act opera, Ballymore: Part One - Winners was paired with Seymour Barab's hilarious farce, La Pizza con Funghi, and received critical acclaim from Opera News: the operas "had great appeal both to old opera hands and to first-time operagoers."

Each season now includes multiple offerings within its concert series, Chelsea Opera presents…, a series of thematic concerts featuring the company’s principal singers and guest artists, whose number now exceeds 400 who have performed principal roles, sung in the ensemble, been involved in design/production, and played in the Chelsea Opera Chamber Orchestra (“COCO”).

== Performances ==
Chelsea Opera’s performances to date have included Suor Angelica, Amahl and the Night Visitors (also given an encore presentation in November 2009), Cavalleria Rusticana, Pagliacci, Don Giovanni, Gianni Schicchi, The Ballad of Baby Doe, The Scarf, and The Bear. Its first production of Le nozze di Figaro was performed in June 2010. The 2011-2012 season included Gian Carlo Menotti’s The Medium, celebrating this composer’s 100th birthday, and Puccini’s Madama Butterfly, featuring tenor Daniel Rodriguez singing his first Lt. Pinkerton.

As part of the company's current and 10th season, the New York premiere of Ballymore - Part One: Winners by Richard Wargo was presented with Seymour Barab's La Pizza con Funghi in October 2013. The season concluded with a rarely heard production of Aaron Copland's The Tender Land.

== Funding ==
Chelsea Opera is a Professional Company Member of OPERA America and is a founding member of the New York Opera Alliance (NYOA). The company has received funding from the New York City Department of Cultural Affairs and the New York State Council on the Arts as well as from several private foundations including The Bettina Baruch Foundation, The Tow Foundation, The Banfi Vintners Foundation, The Barbara Bell Cumming Foundation, The Joyce Dutka Arts Foundation, The H. O. Peet Foundation, and The New York University Community Fund. In June 2014, the company was awarded its first National Endowment for the Arts "Art Works" grant to take A Distant Love: Songs of John and Abigail Adams to the Adams National Historical Park for a performance on June 21, celebrating a founding father on Father's Day. Upon returning from that mini-tour, the company learned that it had received a 2nd NEA-Art Works grant to revive its 2010 production of Tom Cipullo's Glory Denied.
