= Mill City Summer Opera =

American nonprofit performing arts organization

- Origin: Minneapolis, Minnesota, U.S.
- Genre: Opera
- Years active: 2012–2020
- Members: Founder; Karen Brooks; Executive Director Cory Johnson
- Website: millcitysummeropera.com

Mill City Summer Opera was a non-profit performing arts organization that produced live opera in Minneapolis. It produced one opera per year, most of which have been staged in the non-traditional venue of the Ruins Courtyard of the Mill City Museum in Northeast Minneapolis, Minnesota. In 2017, the company produced in the nearby Machine Shop event space due to conservation work taking place in the Ruins Courtyard. The company's inaugural production in July 2012 was the two-act Italian opera Pagliacci, composed by Ruggero Leoncavallo.

The company continued to produce opera and other types of music dramas for the summer arts audience in the Twin Cities every year until it dissolved in 2020, with productions of Gioacchino Rossini's The Barber of Seville in 2013; Giacomo Puccini's Tosca in 2014; Gaetano Donizetti's La fille du régiment in 2015; Stephen Sondheim's Sweeney Todd: The Demon Barber of Fleet Street in 2016; and Ástor Piazzolla's María de Buenos Aires in 2017. In addition, the organization offered alternative educational and contemporary programming, including opera scenes featuring emerging artists in the opera field and fusion programming.
