= Richard Kapp =

American conductor (1936–2006)

- Born: October 9, 1936; Chicago, Illinois
- Died: June 4, 2006 (aged 69); Danbury, Connecticut
- Occupation: conductor

Richard Kapp (October 9, 1936 – June 4, 2006) was an American conductor.

Richard Kapp was born in Chicago, Illinois. He was a child piano prodigy. He studied German political history at Johns Hopkins University and received his BA in 1957. He then went abroad on a Fulbright fellowship and studied conducting, composition, and piano at the Stuttgart Staatliche Hochschule für Musik in Germany.

Kapp started his musical career as a vocal coach at the Basel Stadttheater, Switzerland. He then moved back in the United States and served as music director of the Opera Theater of the Manhattan School of Music in New York from 1963 to 1965. While in New York City he earned a law degree from the New York University in 1966. He also studied conducting, piano and harpsichord.

In 1968 Richard Kapp founded the chamber orchestra Philharmonia Virtuosi of New York. He served as their musical director for the rest of his life. Among other notable concerts the Philharmonia Virtuosi of New York gave the inaugural concert at the Performing Arts Center at the State University of New York at Purchase in 1977.

The Philharmonia Virtuosi of New York performed and recorded until 2004 when concerts were suspended when Kapp became ill.

With the Philharmonia Virtuosi of New York Kapp released a series of classical "greatest hits" records. This included the 1977 album "Greatest Hits of 1720" on CBS Masterworks. These albums were collections of shorter more accessible repertoire that were designed to have popular appeal. Kapp and the Philharmonia Virtuosi also recorded a notable collection of three volumes of "Vivaldi's Favorites".

Kapp was the first of the original plaintiffs in Golan v. Holder, a 2012 United States Supreme Court that held that restoration of copyrights under the Uruguay Round Agreements Act was not unconstitutional. Kapp joined the case to oppose the restoration of U.S. copyright in orchestral public domain works such as Shostakovich's String Quartets, which Kapp had previously arranged while in the public domain, and which he would be unable to continue to exploit after restoration without paying royalties.

Kapp died at his home in Danbury, Connecticut, at the age of 69 from cancer.
