= Pensacola Opera =

The Pensacola Opera is an American opera company located in Pensacola, Florida. Founded in 1983, the company presents an annual season of opera at the Saenger Theatre.
