= Philharmonia Virtuosi =

American orchestra (founded 1974)

- Chamber orchestra
- Founded: 1974
- Principal conductor: Richard Kapp

The Philharmonia Virtuosi is a chamber orchestra that first performed in 1974. It was founded by Richard Kapp, who conducted the orchestra until the time of his death in 2006.
