= Opera Memphis =

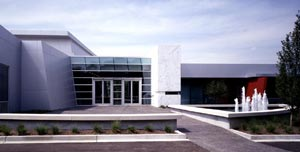
An exterior view of the Clark Opera Memphis Center

Opera Memphis is a Memphis, Tennessee non-profit arts organization chartered in 1956 by a group of Memphians interested in producing regional opera. Charter signatories included noted Memphians Philip Belz and Walter Chandler. Early productions consisted mainly of local singers and local directors. During this initial period the Metropolitan Opera Company toured regularly through the area and performed in Memphis two to three times per year. As the company grew, the performers and directors became more regional and the sets and costumes more professional. By the mid-1970s, Opera Memphis began bringing in well-known singers like Leontyne Price, Beverly Sills, Joan Sutherland, Sherrill Milnes, and Birgit Nilsson to perform in lead roles.

Opera Memphis is widely respected for its education and outreach programs, which currently reach over 25,000 children and adults per season. From 1993 to 1995, the company was the recipient of an Arts Plus Grant from the National Endowment for the Arts, which resulted in student written and produced operas at three Memphis City high schools. Current program offerings include the Artist-in-Residence Tour, Opera 101, Black Roots of Opera, Student Dress Rehearsals and Summer Conservatory.

In March 2004, the company completed a very successful $7.3 million capital drive for the creation and construction of the Clark Opera Memphis Center in East Memphis, a 19,000 square foot administrative center, which includes a rehearsal hall, small performance space, costume shop and small props shop. The center is a cultural center for the community, a meeting place for corporate leaders, and a facility that speaks for the arts through both our function and our architecture.

Creation of a festival

Under Ned Canty's restructuring, the season shifted the company from three mainstage productions a year to two mainstage shows a year and the addition of the Midtown Opera Festival in the spring. The opera festival is organized as two additional smaller scale mainstage productions designed for intimate spaces or as chamber operas, as well as academic panels and pay-what-you-can shows and activities.

== Personnel ==
- Michael Ching, 1992 to 2010:

In 1992 the composer, conductor, and music administrator joined Opera Memphis as Artistic Director, a position he held through 2010. In addition, he held the post of General Director for most of those years. The company premiered his completely a cappella opera A Midsummer Night's Dream in 2011 at Playhouse on the Square, and Albany Records released the CD of the production in 2014.

- Ned Canty, 2011 forward:

In December 2010, the Board of Trust announced Canty as the new Opera Memphis General Director. Since his arrival, he has made many significant changes including the creation of "30 Days of Opera" and a restructuring of the regular season. "30 Days of Opera" was originally conceived as a September/October series of pop-up opera presentations in public spaces throughout the region that offer free exposure to opera in what Canty has described as an effort to "create a trail of breadcrumbs" to opera. "30 Days of Opera" has since moved to April and celebrated its 10th year of serving Memphians in 2021. The pandemic saw the creation of Opera Memphis's lauded Sing2Me program, which connects audiences to artists for pop-up concerts with opera and musical theater selections.
