= Connecticut Lyric Opera =

American opera company

The Connecticut Lyric Opera, founded in 2003 by a group of professional musicians and opera-lovers and based in New London, Connecticut, is now the only full-season opera company in Southeastern Connecticut.
