= Charlottesville Opera =

American opera company

Charlottesville Opera, before 2017 known as Ash Lawn Opera, is an opera company, founded in 1978 in Charlottesville, Virginia. For the company's first thirty years, performances were held in the boxwood garden at Ash Lawn-Highland, the home of President James Monroe. Since 2009 performances have been held at the renovated Paramount Theater in downtown Charlottesville.

Charlottesville Opera currently produces four original productions each season: a semi-staged concert opera in the spring; a full-length opera and a musical in the summer; and a holiday opera in December. In addition to the standard operatic repertoire, Charlottesville Opera's productions have included American musicals and 20th century American operas such as Carlisle Floyd's Susannah, as well as such pieces as Leonard Bernstein's Candide.

Charlottesville Opera also provides a wide range of educational programs for youth and adults; professional training for emerging artists and interns; and seeks to enrich the cultural vitality and quality of life in Virginia and the mid-Atlantic region.
