= Opera America =

Opera America (stylized as OPERA America) is a New York–based non-profit arts organization promoting the creation, presentation, and enjoyment of opera in the United States. Almost all professional opera companies and some semi-professional companies in the United States are members of the organization including such opera companies as the Metropolitan Opera, San Francisco Opera, Lyric Opera of Chicago, Washington National Opera, and Dallas Opera. Opera America also includes opera companies from Canada.

The organization was founded in 1970 and has been led by President and CEO Marc A. Scorca since 1990.

In April 2014, advisers from Opera America worked with San Diego Opera to develop a plan to prevent that company's closure.

In January 2026 Michael J. Bobbitt became CEO and president of Opera America.

== National Opera Center ==
The National Opera Centre at 330 Seventh Avenue, Chelsea, Manhattan, has three performance and recital spaces: the Marc A. Scorca Hall, Rehearsal Hall, and MacKay Studio. It also provides private studios. The National Opera Center has been the venue of performances by artists of companies such as Wolf Trap Opera. In 2018, the Christman Opera Company performed Theodore Christman's operas Adriana McMannes and A Metamorphosis at the National Opera Center. The Opera Center has been the venue of premieres and workshops of works by composers such as Clint Borzoni and Bruce Wolosoff.

== See also ==
- Deutscher Bühnenverein, equivalent national organization in Germany
- Réunion des Opéras de France, French national association
- Opera Europa, sister organization covering Europe
