= John Darrenkamp =

American baritone and voice teacher (born 1935)

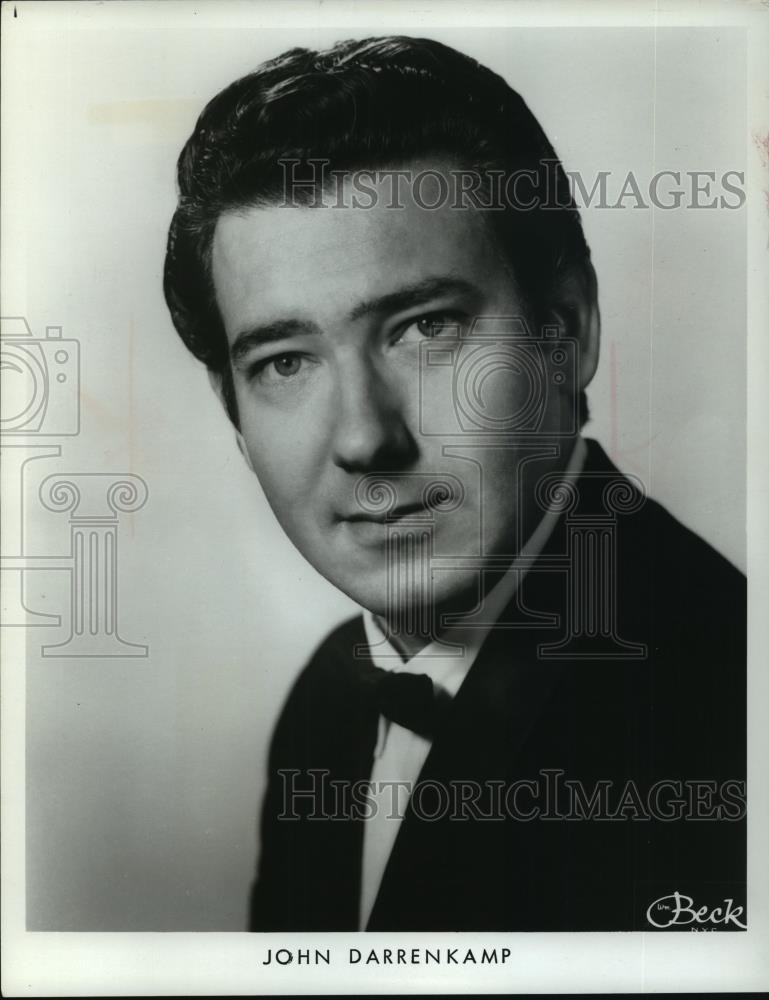
- Darrenkamp in 1971
- Born: July 1935 (age 91); Lancaster, Pennsylvania, United States
- Occupations: Baritone, voice teacher
- Organizations: Metropolitan Opera; OperaLancaster

John David Darrenkamp (born July 1935) is an American baritone and voice teacher. He was a leading baritone at the New York City Opera from 1969 to 1977, starring in several operas opposite Beverly Sills. He sang regularly at the Metropolitan Opera ("the Met") in mainly comprimario roles from 1979 to 1992, returning later to the Met stage for one last opera in 1995 after a gap of some years. He appeared in more than 500 performances at the Met in 27 different roles. In his late career he worked as a standby at the Met until his retirement from professional performance in 1999. He joined the faculty of Pennsylvania Academy of Music in 1991 where he taught until the school's closure in 2011. As of 2023 he was teaching singing at Lancaster's Popovsky Performing Arts Studio.

A native of Lancaster, Pennsylvania, Darrenkamp served in the United States Marine Corps during the Korean War and worked at U.S. military facilities before becoming an opera singer. He developed an interest in opera through performances in productions with the Lancaster Opera Workshop (later OperaLancaster) from 1959 to 1965. In 1964 he won a scholarship to the Academy of Vocal Arts in Philadelphia where he studied until his graduation in 1969. While a student there he made his professional opera debut with the Philadelphia Lyric Opera Company in 1966. In his early career he performed in many operas in Philadelphia, and later starred as Valentin in Charles Gounod's Faust in the first production staged by the newly created Opera Company of Philadelphia (now Opera Philadelphia) in 1975.

On the international stage, Darrenkamp starred in one opera at the Palacio de Bellas Artes in Mexico City and two operas with Montserrat Caballé at the Liceu in Barcelona in 1969. He worked as a leading baritone with regional opera companies throughout the United States from the late 1960s into the early 1980s, sometimes working with major stars like Luciano Pavarotti, Franco Corelli, Renata Tebaldi, and Joan Sutherland. Some of the roles he sang repeatedly included Count Almaviva in Mozart's The Marriage of Figaro, Escamillo in Georges Bizet's Carmen, Lescaut in Massenet's Manon, Marcello in Giacomo Puccini's La bohème, Sharpless in Puccini's Madame Butterfly, and Gounod's Valentin. He was also active as a concert singer with American orchestras, and sang the title role in Felix Mendelssohn's Elijah many time during his career. In retirement he has remained active in mainly non-professional community concerts in Lancaster and the surrounding region. In the 2010s he worked as the artistic director of OperaLancaster, and has both directed and performed in events with that organization. In 2024 he sang in concert with the Penn Square Opera at the age of 88.

== Early life and marriage ==
The son of John Elwood Darrenkamp and Pearl Mae Darrenkamp (nee Huss), John David Darrenkamp was born in Lancaster, Pennsylvania in July 1935. His father worked as a machinist at the Permutit Company, and was a resident of Lancaster for his entire life. His mother was also a Lancaster native. He had one brother, Robert William Darrenkamp, who had a lengthy career as a respiratory therapist at the Brookwood Medical Center in Birmingham, Alabama.

As a child, Darrenkamp's singing ability was first identified by his sixth-grade teacher at Lafayette School, Miss Jean Pyott, who convinced him to join the school chorus. He became active as a boy soprano at St. James Episcopal Church in Lancaster where he received voice training with Frank McConnell. He attended John Reynolds Junior High School where he was a member of the boy's glee club directed by Edna I. Brown. After his voice changed, he sang as a baritone in the choir at First Church of God in Lancaster where he became a member in 1950.

Darrenkamp attended J. P. McCaskey High School, but dropped out when he was 17 to join the military. In 1952 he enlisted in the United States Marine Corps, beginning his service in July of that year. He was stationed at Camp Lejeune in Jacksonville, North Carolina, in 1953. In 1954 he was deployed to Turkey as a member of the 1st Battalion, 6th Marines in the United States Sixth Fleet. He completed his high school education in the military, and was a veteran of the Korean War.

After finishing his service in the marines, Darrenkamp worked as a production clerk at the Marietta Air Force Station in Marietta, Pennsylvania, into the early 1960s. He also spent some time working at the Olmsted Air Force Base. He concurrently worked as a staff church and synagogue singer at both First Methodist Church and Congregation Shaarai Shomayim in Lancaster. In 1956 he married Jocelyn May Flowers, and the couple settled at a home in Lancaster on W. Vine St. Early in the marriage they had three daughters: Dawn, Julia, and Elaine. Elaine was born with serious developmental disability, and she was institutionalized at Allentown State Hospital.

== Early years with Lancaster Opera Workshop ==
Darrenkamp began studying voice with Frederick H. Robinson briefly as a teenager but abandoned these studies upon joining the marines. He resumed studies with Robinson in 1956. Robinson was a former opera singer and the founder and director of the Lancaster Opera Workshop (LOW), a quasi-professional community theatre organization that used non-paid amateur and professional singers and a paid professional orchestra. In December 1959 Darrenkamp made his opera debut with LOW as the Page in Gian Carlo Menotti's Amahl and the Night Visitors in a production directed by Robinson. In January 1960 he became an official member of the LOW when he was 24 years old.

In May 1960 Darrenkamp performed the role of Prince Yamadori in LOW's production of Giacomo Puccini's Madama Butterfly at the Fulton Opera House (FOH) with Dorothy Rose Smith in the title role. He continued to perform regularly in LOW productions and concerts in the Lancaster region in his formative years. Some of the parts he performed with LOW included Count Gil in The Secret of Susanna (1961), Toby in The Medium (1961), the Sailor in Gabriele Pierne's La croisade des infant's (1961, sung in English as The Children's Crusade), Marcello in La bohème (1962), Escamillo in Carmen (1963), the title role in Gianni Schicchi (1964 & 1965), and Valentine in Faust (1965).

Darrenkamp was also involved with other musical groups in the Lancaster area in the 1960s, including appearing as a guest soloist with choirs at Elizabethtown College and the Lancaster Civic Chorus. From 1963 to 1966 he portrayed the American Revolutionary soldier Captain Matthew Hale in the annually staged pageant Vorspiel at the Ephrata Cloister which was directed by Robinson but not a part of LOW. It featured music by the religious leader Conrad Beissel who founded the Ephrata Community. He also worked as an oratorio soloist with local church groups.

== Academy of Vocal Arts and early professional work ==
Approaching the age of 30, Darrenkamp won a scholarship to the Academy of Vocal Arts (AVA) in Philadelphia in 1964. He was also given a scholarship of $1,000.00 by LOW to support additional expenses while he attended the school. At that time he had three young children, and had not yet learned to read music or play piano having previously picked up his repertoire by listening to recordings or hearing material in rehearsals. He studied voice at AVA for three years with Dorothy DiScala. He was also trained in many other skills there from music literacy and basic piano skills to stage movement and acting and foreign languages. He also sang in many student opera productions at the school. He graduated from AVA in 1969.

While a student at AVA, Darrenkamp gave his first performance with a professional company portraying Zuàne in the Philadelphia Lyric Opera Company's (PLO) October 1966 production of Arrigo Boito's La Gioconda. It was performed at the Academy of Music (AM) under conductor Anton Guadagno. Renata Tebaldi portayed the title role with Franco Corelli as Enzo and Mignon Dunn as Laura. That same month he appeared at the AM as the baritone soloist in Orff's Carmina Burana in a co-production with the Pennsylvania Ballet and the Philadelphia Oratorio Society (POS). He had previously performed with the POS as the baritone soloist in A German Requiem by Brahms in 1966 which was recorded for radio broadcast.

Some of the other roles he performed with the PLO at the AM included Le Dancaïre in Carmen (1967, with Grace Bumbry), Pâris in Roméo et Juliette (1967), and Valentine in Gounod's Faust (1967). He sang the role of Schaunard in La bohème at PLO in 1968 with Judith Raskin as Mimì and Giacomo Aragall as Rodolfo, and then returned to the PLO in the same opera as Marcello in 1969 with a cast led by Tebaldi and Corelli. In 1972 he performed with the PLO at the Robin Hood Dell in the title role of The Barber of Seville before a crowd of 9,000 people. In 1974 he sang Sharpless to Renata Scotto's Cio-Cio-San in PLO's production of Madama Butterfly.

Darrenkamp was also active in operas conducted by Carl Suppa for Philadelphia's Little Lyric Opera Company which were given at the Philadelphia Museum of Art, including portraying Dr Malatesta in Don Pasquale (1967) and Germont in La traviata (1968). He also performed in operas presented in concert versions at the Penn Museum with the Concerto Soloists and conductor Marc Mastovoy, performing the roles of Polyphemus in George Frideric Handel's Acis and Galatea (1967) and Nanni in Joseph Haydn's rarely performed L'infedeltà delusa (1968).

In 1969 Darrenkamp made his European debut at the Liceu in Barcelona, Spain as Lescaut in Jules Massenet's Manon, and was also head there that same year as Giorgio Talbot in Donizetti's Maria Stuarda. Both productions starred Montserrat Caballé. That same year he performed Marcello at the Palacio de Bellas Artes in Mexico City, and was a guest soloist with the men's chorus of the Orpheus Club of Philadelphia.

== New York career ==
=== New York City Opera ===
Darrenkamp moved to New York City in 1969, and continued his voice studies there with Jerry Forderhase. While he had a New York City apartment, he maintained his family residence in Lancaster. He made his debut with the New York City Opera (NYCO) that year as Sharpless in Madama Butterfly with Barbara Rondelli as Cio-Cio-San. He sang Sharpless again at the NYCO in 1970 with Maralin Niska as Cio-Cio San. In October 1969 he sang the title role in the NYCO's production of Borodin's Prince Igor. In 1970 he performed the role of Lescaut in Jules Massenet's Manon with Beverly Sills in the title role, a role he repeated in 1973 with Patricia Brooks assuming the part of Manon.

Some of the other operas Darrenkamp performed in with NYCO included Gounod's Faust (1970, as Valentin), Menotti's Help, Help, the Globolinks! (1970, as Dr. Stone with Ellen Faull as Madame Euterpova), Mozart's Così fan tutte (1971, as Guglielmo), Mozart's Don Giovanni (1972, as Masetto to Veronica Tyler's Zerlina) Donizetti's Maria Stuarda (1972, as Talbot to Maria of Beverly Sills), Puccini's La bohème (1972, as Marcello to Rodolfo of Enrico Di Giuseppe and Mimì of Gilda Cruz-Romo), and Mascagni's Cavalleria rusticana (1973, as Alfio to Canio of Herman Malamood). He repeated the role of Alfio at the NYCO in 1976 with Ermanno Mauro as Canio.

In May 1972 Darrenkamp toured with the NYCO for performances as Count Almaviva in The Marriage of Figaro at the Kennedy Center, a role he had previously sung at the NYCO's home venue, the New York State Theater, in September 1971. One of his most frequently assailed roles at NYCO was Escamillo in Bizet's Carmen which he first sang with the company in 1972. He repeated the role with a succession of rotating Carmens, among them Gwendolyn Killebrew (1973), Olivia Stapp (1975), and Diane Curry (1976). Other operas he appeared in with NYCO included Menotti's The Consul (1974, as John Sorel), and Jack Beeson's Lizzie Borden (1976, as Captain Jason MacFarlane). He remained a resident artist at NYCO into 1977.

=== Metropolitan Opera ===
Darrenkamp made his debut at the Metropolitan Opera ("the Met") on September 24, 1979, as Montano in Franco Zefferelli's staging of Verdi's Otello with Plácido Domingo in the title role. He was a regular performer at the Met until the end of the 1991–1992 season, portraying more than 27 different characters consisting mainly of smaller supporting roles. He performed with Domingo again as Marullo in the Met's production of Rigoletto which was filmed for a 1981 television broadcast on PBS's Live from the Metropolitan Opera. In 1983 he sang a 15-minute excerpt from Act 1 of L'italiana in Algeri with Gail Dubinbaum, David Rendall, Edda Moser, Dale Duesing, and Diane Kesling at the Met's gala concert celebrating the 100th anniversary of the company.

In 1984 Darrenkamp sang the role of the Herald in Rinaldo in the Met's first staging of an opera by Handel, a production starring Marilyn Horne in the title role which was recorded live for the Met radio broadcasts. Other operas he performed in at the Met which were recorded for radio broadcasts included Un ballo in maschera (1980, as Silvano), Billy Budd (1980, as Donald with Richard Stilwell as Billy), La traviata (1984 as Barone Douphol with Kiri Te Kanawa as Violetta and Nicolai Gedda as Alfredo), and Rise and Fall of the City of Mahagonny (1984, as Billy Bank Books with Richard Cassilly as Mahagonny).

Other roles Darrenkamp performed at the Met included Mr. Redburn in Billy Budd (1980), Rangoni in Boris Godunov (1982), Hermann in The Tales of Hoffmann (1982), Berlingerio in Francesca da Rimini (1984), Ned Keene in Peter Grimes (1984, with Martti Talvela). Cesare Angelott in Tosca (1984, with Renata Scotto), Fiorello in The Barber of Seville (1984, with Kathleen Battle as Rosina), Yamadori in Madama Butterfly (1986), and Morales in Carmen (1986, with Grace Bumbry). In another performance of the latter opera he replaced an ailing Lenus Carlson as Escamillo in a Met tour to Detroit in 1980, having previously sung the role at the Metropolitan Opera House on November 8, 1979. Several bus loads of Lancaster residents traveled to New York to attend this November 1979 performance in what Lancaster newspapers have sometime called his "Met debut".

In 1987 he repeated the role of Barone Douphol when Diana Soviero took over the role of Violetta at the Met. His last appearance at the Met was on April 21, 1995, as a Trader in John Corigliano's The Ghosts of Versailles, a role he had sung earlier in the opera's world premiere production in the 1991–1992 season. He was also highly active as a "cover singer" at the Met, serving on stand-by for productions in case a lead singer was unable to perform. While he never sang again with the company in a performance after April 1995, it was reported that he officially retired from the Met in 1999.

== Other opera performances ==
=== Regional opera in the United States ===
Darrenkamp was active as a leading baritone in regional theatres in North America from late 1960s into the 1980s. In 1967 he gave his first performance at the Connecticut Opera Association (COA) in the small role of the Corporal in La fille du régiment with Anna Moffo as Marie. That same year he performed the role of Malatesta in Don Pasquale with Opera Under the Stars in Rochester, New York. In April 1969 he made his debut with Opera Company of Boston at the Shubert Theatre as Count Almaviva in The Marriage of Figaro under conductor Sarah Caldwell with Simon Estes as Figaro. He later repeated this role at the Chautauqua Opera in 1972.

In the summer of 1969 he made his debut at the Cincinnati Opera as Marcello in La bohème for performances at the Cincinnati Zoo and Botanical Garden. He subsequently portrayed Marcello with many companies in North America, among them COA (1971), Fort Worth Opera (FWO, 1971 & 1975), Opera Memphis (1974), Manitoba Opera (1975), and Shreveport Civic Opera (1977). He also performed the role of Schaunard in this opera at the Opera Guild of Greater Miami in 1972 with Luciano Pavarotti as Rodolfo. He performed several more roles in Cincinnati, among them Belcore in L'elisir d'amore (1969) and Escamillo in Bizet's Carmen (1970, with Shirley Verrett). He later sang Escamillo at FWO (1971, with Joy Davidson), Charlotte Opera (1974), Portland Opera (1977, with Olivia Stapp), and Dayton Opera (1979, with Ann Howard). He repeated both Marcello and Escamillo in Cincinnati in 1971.

Another part Darrenkamp performed in Cincinnati in 1969 was Valentine in Gounod's Faust. He repeated this role at the Baltimore Opera Company (BOC, 1970), FWO (1971), Wolf Trap Opera (1971), and COA (1977). He importantly sang Valentine in the very first opera staged by the newly created Opera Company of Philadelphia (now Opera Philadelphia) in October 1975. That production starred Michele Molese as Faust and was conducted by Jean Périsson. He made several more appearances at the BOC during his career, performing in productions of L'elisir d'amore (1974, as Belcore), Maria Stuarda (1976, as Talbot), Falstaff (1977, as Ford), Madama Buttefly (1978, as Sharpless to Nancy Shade's Butterfly) and Verdi's Don Carlo (1978, as Rodrigo with Piero Visconti in the title role). He stated in a 2023 interview that the role of Ford, which he only performed in the 1977 BOC production, was the most difficult part for him vocally out of all of the roles he played in his entire career.

Darrenkamp also sang Sharpless at Cincinnati Opera (1970), Mississippi Opera (1971) New Orleans Opera (1973, with Jeannette Pilou as Cio-Cio-San), and the Harrisburg Opera Association (1999). In 1971 he portrayed Figaro to Joy Davidson's Rosina in The Barber of Seville at Civic Center Music Hall with the Oklahoma City Opera Guild and Oklahoma City Symphony Orchestra. That same year he performed the role of Germont in La traviata at Century II Performing Arts & Convention Center with the Wichita Symphony Orchestra. He later repeated the role of Germont at the San Antonio Grand Opera Festival (1974, with Beverly Sills), Shreveport Civic Opera (1974, with Sills), and the Fort Myers Symphony Orchestra (1974). He had earlier appeared with Sills as Lord Enrico Ashton in Lucia di Lammermoor at the Mississippi Opera in 1971 with the soprano in the title role. He later sang this role at Georgia Opera in Atlanta in 1979 with Karin Ott in her American debut.

In 1973 Darrenkamp portrayed John the butcher in the United States premiere of Ralph Vaughan Williams's Hugh the Drover for his first appearance at the Houston Grand Opera with Jack Trussel in the title role and Charles Rosekrans conducting. In 1974 he sang Silvio in Pagliacci at FWO. In 1978 he portrayed the villian Leandro in Prokofiev's The Love for Three Oranges at the San Diego Opera (SDO) with Muriel Costa-Greenspon as his conspiring partner Clarice. He had previously sung with the SDO as Count Almaviva in The Marriage of Figaro (1973, with Norman Treigle as Figaro and Johanna Meier as the Countess), Lord Enrico Ashton in Lucia di Lammermoor (1974, with Joan Sutherland as Lucia), Puccini's Marcello (1975, with Karan Armstrong as Mimi) and Falke in Die Fledermaus (1977). The Sutherland Lucia di Lammermoor production was repeated in Arizona with the Phoenix Symphony.

In 1978 Darrenkamp portrayed Mercutio in Gounod's Roméo et Juliette at the Dayton Opera and Toledo Opera (co-production). In 1979 he sang Lescaut in Massenet's Manon at FWO (Diana Soviero), and that same year sang Lescaut in Puccini's Manon Lescaut at Opera Memphis with Susan Straley in the title role. He had previously sung Puccini's Lescaut at COA in 1975. He returned to Memphis in 1982 to sing Hermann in The Tales of Hoffmann. In 1990 he performed the role of the King of Egypt in Verdi's Aida at Giants Stadium as part of the International Opera Festival with Grace Bumbry in the title role.

=== Lancaster ===
During his professional career, Darrenkamp would occasionally return to Lancaster Opera Company (LOC, formerly Lanacaster Opera Workshop) as a volunteer performer for its productions at the Fulton Opera House (FOH). With this company he portrayed Escamillo in Carmen (1974), and the villains Dr. Miracle and Dapertutto in The Tales of Hoffmann in 1978 and in 1996. He starred as Méphistophélès in LOC's 1987 production of Faust. He portrayed Horace Taber in the company's 1992 staging of Douglas Moore's The Ballad of Baby Doe with Andrea Folan in the title role. This production was filmed and released on VHS. In 1996 he was the featured guest performer in the company's sapphire anniversary concert with the Lancaster Symphony Orchestra. He directed his first opera in Lancaster in 1999, staging LOC's production of Donizetti's The Elixir of Love.

He also periodically performed in musicals at the FOH with the Actors Company of Pennsylvania and the Fulton Summer Repertory Company, including portraying Frank Butler in Annie Get Your Gun (1976), Tommy Albright in Brigadoon (1979), Cervantes/Don Quixote in Man of La Mancha (1980) and Emile de Becque in Rodgers and Hammerstein's South Pacific (1977 & 1994).

== Concert performances ==
According to Leo Riemens and Karl-Josef Kutsch, Darrenkamp was highly regarded as a concert and oratorio soloist. In 1965 he gave his first performance of the title role in Felix Mendelssohn's Elijah in a staged production of the oratorio with the Lancaster Opera Workshop (LOW). He reprised the role the following year with the chorus of Lebanon Valley College. He sang Elijah again many times, including at West Chester University in 1967, with both LOW and the John Harms Chorus in 1970; with POS in 1971 under conductor Earl Ness in a performance recorded for radio broadcast; with the Fort Myers Symphony Orchestra in Florida in 1974, and the Philharmonic Symphony of Westchester in 1980.

Darrenkamp was a soloist in Orff's Carmina Burana with the NYCO and the Pennsylvania Ballet at Lincoln Center (1970), and the Baltimore Symphony Orchestra (1975, with Carmen Balthrop). In December 1972 he was the soloist in Ernest Bloch's Sacred Service with the San Antonio Symphony and the Maestersingers chorus. That same month he was a soloist in Vaughan Williams's Hodie with the Springfield Symphony Orchestra. In 1973 he was a soloist in Vaughan Williams's Dona nobis pacem with the Williams Choral Society at Williams College, and performed the role of Wolfram in a concert version of Tannhäuser with the Minnesota Orchestra.

In May 1976 Darrenkamp sang a concert of opera arias and duets with soprano Faye Robinson and the New Jersey Symphony Orchestra. The following July he performed the role of Papageno in a concert version of The Magic Flute with the Pittsburgh Symphony Orchestra (PSO) under the baton of Fiora Contino at the Temple University Music Festival in Philadelphia. He was also heard with the PSO in Pittsburgh that year in one of the symphony's Pops concerts singing duets with soprano Elizabeth Hynes. In 1979 he sang a benefit concert at the Rajah Theatre in Reading, Pennsylvania to raise funds for the Berks Grand Opera.

Darrenkamp gave national recital tours of the United States in the early 1970s. Some of the venues where he performed recitals during his career included Saint Joseph Abbey in Louisiana (1970), Frazier Hall, Idaho State University (1970), the Cotton Auditorium in Fort Bragg, California (1970), Midland High School in Texas (1971), Eastern Illinois University (1972), the Beaumont City Auditorium (1972), Austin Peay State University (1973), Rome Free Academy (1974), Jacksonville State University (1975), the Jackson Civic Center in Tennessee (1977), the Louisville Memorial Auditorium (1978), Gettysburg College (1982), and Gold Coast Music Hall in Mountain View, California (1985).

In 1986 he performed the concert "From Bizet to Broadway" with the Kennett Symphony at Longwood Gardens. In 1988 he performed the title role in Boito's Mefistofele at the Berkshire Choral Festival with the Springfield Symphony Orchestra. In 1990 he sang a concert with tenor Michael Best and the Pennsylvania Sinfonia Orchestra at Cedar Crest College. In 1991 he was a soloist in Mozart's Requiem with the Moravian Choir of Bethlehem. In June 1995 he sang "The Star-Spangled Banner" at Veterans Stadium to open a Philadelphia Phillies game.

In 1997 he sang in the Baltimore Opera's concert "Lights! Camera! Opera!" at the Maryland Arts Festival at Towson University. He retired from professional performance in 1999. In 2000 he performed under conductor Christofer Macatsoris in the 65th anniversary concert of the AVA given at Philadelphia's Academy of Music, having previously performed in a similar 60th anniversary concert in 1995.

== Teaching career and later life ==
In 1991 Darrenkamp joined the voice faculty of the Pennsylvania Academy of Music (PAM) in Lancaster after previously teaching masterclasses at Gettysburg College and Mercy University (MU). He transitioned from teaching part time at PAM to working full time after his retirement from singing professionally in 1999. He was awarded an honorary doctorate from MU (then Mercy College) in 1990.

Darrenkamp performed in PAM concerts featuring faculty and students. In 1994 he sang a duet from The Magic Flute in a concert at PAM with his daughter, the Roman Catholic nun Julia Mary Darrenkamp, and in 1995 he sang at a PAM gala concert that was host by Patrice Munsel. In 1997 he sang Sharpless in PAM's performance of Madame Butterfly. A photographic portrait of Darrenkamp was given by the Musical Art Society of Lancaster to PAM in 2002 to hang inside the conservatory. He was still teaching at PAM as late as May 2010 when his students gave a group recital. Not long after this the school experienced financial problems, closing permanently in March 2011. He later joined the staff of Lancaster's Popovsky Performing Arts Studio where he was still actively teaching singing as of 2023.

While no longer singing professionally, Darrenkamp has remained active in community concerts in the Lancaster region. In 2006 he sang a concert of opera music with OperaLancaster (OL, formerly Lancaster Opera Workshop) at the Fulton Opera House, returning to the organization which first introduced him to the opera artform. After this he staged several of OL's productions, including Pagliacci (2007), Cavalleria rusticana (2009), and Tosca (2011) When the OL staged Puccini's La bohème in 2010, Darrenkamp was serving as the company's artistic director. He was still in that position when the company staged Madama Butterfly in 2012, but was no longer serving in that role when he directed OL's production of Don Pasquale in May 2015. In December 2015 he performed the role of Melchior in OL's production of Amahl and the Night Visitors, returning to the opera he first sang with the company in 1959.

In 2012 Darrenkamp was the bass soloist in Handel's Messiah with the Lancaster Chamber Singers. He has sung in many of the Lancaster Lemonade Concert Series, first appearing in the series as a guest artist in 1974, and most recently performing in the series in 2023 and 2024. In 2024 he sang in Penn Square Opera's concert "Voices in Sacred Song", and he performed at an event at Highland Presbyterian Church in April 2025.

Darrenhamp's marriage of 65 years ended upon his wife Jocelyn's death on November 23, 2021. Jocelyn never ceased living in Lancaster during their marriage, and John would commute back to Lancaster from New York when possible during his career.
