= Robert Brubaker (tenor) =

American operatic tenor (born 1953)

Robert Brubaker (born Earl Robert Brubaker, January 14, 1953) is an American singer and actor who has had a long international performance career in operas, musicals, and concerts. A native of Lancaster County, Pennsylvania, he made his opera debut in 1970 at the age of 17 as a baritone with the quasi-professional Lancaster Opera Workshop. He performed in operas and musicals in Lancaster during the early 1970s prior to studying voice at the Hartt College of Music from 1972-1977. In 1978 he joined the chorus of the New York City Opera (NYCO). He performed as a chorus member in the NYCO until he was promoted to a principal baritone in 1983. He played mainly supporting character roles with the NYCO until he transitioned into a leading tenor in 1987. Over the next six years his repertoire at the NYCO included many romantic leads in operas by Giacomo Puccini and Giuseppe Verdi. He remained with the NYCO company until 1993 when he began working as a freelance tenor.

Brubaker made his debut at the Metropolitan Opera ("the Met") as Zorn in Die Meistersinger von Nürnberg in January 1993, and later that same year had a major critical success at the Spoleto Festival USA in the title role of Alexander von Zemlinsky's The Dwarf. He repeated this latter role for his European debut at the Rome Opera, and has since had a busy international career with a variety of European and American opera companies. He has made numerous appearances with the English National Opera, and has appeared as a guest artist with organizations like La Scala, the Paris Opera, the Deutsche Oper Berlin, the Liceu and the Teatro Real among many others. Described by critics as a "lyric heldentenor", he has sung many parts from the dramatic and lyric tenor fachs; including roles in operas by Richard Wagner, Richard Strauss, Benjamin Britten, Sergei Prokofiev, and Leoš Janáček among other composers. He has performed with intermittent regularity with the Met; most recently as Monostatos in The Magic Flute in 2017. Several of his Met performances have been recorded for Metropolitan Opera Live in HD or the Metropolitan Opera radio broadcasts. In his late career his repertoire has shifted to character tenor roles. In the late 2010s he gave several performances at the San Francisco Opera; including playing the Witch in Hansel and Gretel in 2019. He has been inactive as a performer since the outbreak of the COVID-19 pandemic in 2020.

== Early life ==
The son of Reverend Arthur Brubaker and his wife Ethel Brubaker, Earl Robert Brubaker was born on a farm on Pleasant Valley Way in Rapho Township, Pennsylvania on January 14, 1953. One of eight children in the Brubaker family, he has four brothers and three sisters. His father was a minister in the Brethren in Christ Church denomination. He spent part of his childhood living in Virginia where his father pastored a church. The family struggled financially and had difficulty making ends meet.

Due to family financial challenges, Robert decided to leave his parents home at the age of 13 and moved back to Pennsylvania to live with his uncle. His frustration with the poor quality of the Virginia schools he attended also informed his choice to leave his parents. He lived with his uncle on a farm located in rural Lancaster County in the region between Manheim and Mount Joy. He lived there until he was 15 years old when he reunited with his parents after they acquired a home in nearby Mount Joy. At that time his father had assumed a position as pastor of Shenk's Union Church near Hershey, Pennsylvania. Robert worked paid jobs, including farm work, since the time he was 13 years old and was entirely self supporting from that age on.

Brubaker took an interest in singing when he joined the choir at Elizabethtown Area High School (EAHS) in the 9th grade. He began taking voice lessons with that choir's director, Charles Millard. With Millard's assistance he successfully auditioned for the district and regional choruses of the Pennsylvania Music Educators Association in 1969; and was able to participate due to Millard's generosity in purchasing the proper concert clothing for Brubaker. His teacher also provided transportation to the events. He became interested in opera after randomly stumbling upon a Metropolitan Opera radio broadcast of Aida while cleaning out the stalls and replacing the hay in his uncle Samuel's cow barn. He subsequently studied voice privately with Romayne Bridgett, and was trained as a baritone. While in high school he attended the Conoy Brethren Church where he served as choir director and a youth leader. He graduated from EAHS in 1971, and then spent the next year working in a lumber mill.

== Education and early career ==
=== Lancaster Opera Workshop and Hartt College of Music ===
In 1970 Brubaker won the Dorothy Darr Lancaster Youth Contest which was sponsored by Lancaster's local opera company. He appeared in his first opera at the age of 17; performing with the Lancaster Opera Workshop (LOW, later known as the Lancaster Opera Company and OperaLancaster) in November 1970 as Silvio in Pagliacci during his senior year at EAHS. He appeared in operas and musicals in Lancaster in the early 1970s; portraying Brack Weaver in Down in the Valley (1971, LOW), Prince Yamadori in Puccini's Madama Butterfly (1972, with LOW); Captain Tarnitz in The Student Prince (1972, LOW), Matt in The Fantasticks (1972, The Actors Company Of Pennsylvania), and Escamillo in Carmen (197?, LOW). He also performed locally as a church musician; including as a soloist in a presentation Handel's Messiah (1970).

In 1972 Brubaker won a four year scholarship to the Hartt College of Music (HCM) at the University of Hartford in Connecticut, and began his studies in the 1972-1973 academic year. At HCM he studied voice with David Rae Smith, and graduated with a bachelor of music degree in 1977. He married fellow HCM student Barbara A. Long in 1974. The couple knew each other earlier having attended high school together before attending the same university. The couple later welcomed a daughter, Monica, into their family in 1982.

While a student at HCM, Brubaker was a soloist at music events at Center Church in Hartford Saint Ann's Church in Avon, and First United Methodist Church of Meriden. In 1977 he was a finalist in the Boston Opera Guild auditions, and won the Eastern Connecticut Symphony's vocal competition for young artists which was held at Connecticut College. This led to a concert contract with the orchestra with Brubaker singing Ralph Vaughan Williams's Five Mystical Songs with that symphony in June 1977.

=== New York City Opera chorus and other early work ===
Brubaker continued his career in the ensemble of the Connecticut Opera Association; performing in the chorus in productions of Don Carlos, Rigoletto, and Otello in 1976-1977. After graduating from HCM, he moved to Montclair, New Jersey and pursued further studies in voice with Metropolitan Opera bass-baritone Louis Sgarro in New York City. He joined the chorus of the New York City Opera (NYCO) in 1978 where he worked initially as a baritone in the company. Some of the NYCO productions he performed in while a chorus member included Naughty Marietta, Street Scene (filmed for PBS), the world premiere production of Miss Havisham's Fire (filmed for PBS), Gluck's Alceste, and Candide. He also occasionally was given tiny comprimario roles in NYCO productions during this period giving his small bits of solo singing; such as the Herald in Maria Stuarda (1981) and the Head Waiter in The Merry Widow (1982). He received vocal coaching at this point of his career from Doris Kosloff, Irene Kahn Berkman, and Richard Foster.

While singing in the NYCO chorus Brubaker pursued other performance opportunities including appearing at the Fulton Opera House as Charlie Dalrymple in Brigadoon (1979), Cole Porter in the musical revue Porter (1980), and Fred Graham/Petruchio in Kiss Me, Kate (1981). He gave recitals at Elizabethtown College (1980), and Central Presbyterian Church, Montclair (1980). In 1982 he sang the part of the "Voice of God" in Igor Stravinsky's biblical drama The Flood in its ballet version Noah and the Flood by George Balanchine which was staged by the New York City Ballet at Lincoln Center. That same year he performed the title role in Martin the Cobbler in his home town of Montclair. He appeared as a baritone soloist with the Oratorio Society of New Jersey multiple times; including in Orff's Carmina Burana (1984), A German Requiem by Brahms (1985), and Haydn's Nelson Mass (1985).

=== New York City Opera baritone and tenor ===
In 1983 Burbaker was promoted to a principle singer at the NYCO; making his debut in a principal role with the company that year as Dancairo in Carmen. He toured nationally in this production with Melanie Sonnenberg in the title role. Other roles he sang with the NYCO included the Lion in Candide (1983-1986), Benoît and Alcindoro in La bohème (1984), Tartaglia/ 2nd Inquisitor in Casanova's Homecoming (1985) Pantalon in The Love for Three Oranges (1985-1986, with John Lankston and Joyce Castle), a beggar in Kismet (1986), Schaunard in La bohème (1986), Stuart in Brigadoon (1986), Wagner in Faust (1986, with Jerry Hadley and Faith Esham), and Seabee Richard West in South Pacific (1987, with Justino Díaz as Emile). In 1984 he portrayed Papageno in The Magic Flute with the New Jersey State Opera.

In 1984 Brubaker began the transition from baritone to tenor under the guidance of Beverly Sills; beginning his work in this area as a cover for tenor parts at the NYCO while performing with that company as a tenor. In 1987 he won the Opera Index Awards competition in New York as a tenor. Shortly after this he made his debut as a tenor at the NYCO as Beppe in Pagliacci. He initially played mainly supporting and secondary tenor parts at the NYCO; including Nogi in The Desert Song (1987), Von Asterberg in The Student Prince (1987), Gastone de Letorières in La traviata (1987, with Marilyn Mims), The First Priest in The Magic Flute (1987), Oliver Hix in The Music Man (1988, with Bob Gunton and Leigh Munro), both Lord Arturo Bucklaw and Normanno in Lucia di Lammermoor (1988), and Pang in Turandot (1991, with Ealynn Voss in the title role).

The earliest major tenor roles Brubaker performed were with the NYCO's touring National Company; including the Duke of Mantua in Rigoletto (1987), Alfredo in La traviata (1989, with Brenda Harris and Sandra Ruggles as Violetta), Rodolfo in La bohème (1990), and Cavaradossi in Tosca (1992, with Nina Warren in the title role). He sang Rodolfo at Lincoln Center with the NYCO for the opening of the 1991-1992 season with Michèle Boucher as Mimì and Lauren Flanigan as Musetta. In the 1992-1993 season he performed with the NYCO as Alfred in Die Fledermaus.

== Later career ==
=== Metropolitan Opera ===
In 1991 a scout for the Metropolitan Opera ("the Met") caught Brubaker's performance as Pang with the NYCO and he was offered an initial contract with the company as a "cover" artist. After covering several tenor parts, he made his Met debut on January 14, 1993, as Zorn in Richard Wagner's Die Meistersinger von Nürnberg. Later that year he portrayed Scaramuccio in the Met's new staging of Ariadne auf Naxos with Jessye Norman in the title role and Ruth Ann Swenson as Zerbinetta. He also performed the role of Rinuccio in Gianni Schicchi at Sylvia and Danny Kaye Playhouse at Hunter College to an audience of children as part of the Met's Opera Guild education outreach program in May 1993. This production was filmed.

In 1997 Brubaker returned to the Met as Bob Boles in Britten's Peter Grimes with Philip Langridge in the title role. That same year he performed the role of Red Whiskers in Britten's Billy Budd at the Met; filming the role for a 1998 televised broadcast. Other roles he has performed at the Met include Albert Gregor in The Makropulos Case (1998 & 2001), Tichon in Káťa Kabanová (1999), Golitsin in Khovanshchina (1999), Mephistopheles in Doktor Faust (2001), Mime in both Siegfried (2009 & 2012-2013) and Das Rheingold (2012-2013), Mao Zedong in Nixon in China (2011), the Witch in Hansel and Gretel (2011 & 2014–2015), Malatestino in Francesca da Rimini (2013, filmed for Metropolitan Opera Live in HD), and Monostatos in The Magic Flute (2016-2017).

=== Freelance tenor in 1990s ===
In 1993 Brubaker made the decision to leave his position with the NYCO and become a freelance artist that worked without a longterm contract with any particular company. He already did some freelance work while working at the NYCO; including giving first performance as Pinkerton in Madama Butterfly in 1989 in Gainesville, Florida as part of the Florida Arts Celebration festival. He later performed Pinkerton at NYCO (1990, with Catherine Lamy as Butterfly), Michigan Opera Theatre (1994, with Karen Notare as Butterfly), Portland Opera Repertory Theatre (1996), the Opera Theatre of Rochester (1997), the Greater Buffalo Opera Company (1997), Kentucky Opera (1998),

In 1990 he performed the role of Arrigo in Verdi's I vespri siciliani with the Opera Orchestra of New York led by Eve Queler at Carnegie Hall with Susan Dunn as Elena. That same year he appeared with the Canadian Opera Company as Cassio in Otello and Ruggero in La Rondine. In 1991 he portrayed Lucas Wardlaw in Carlisle Floyd's The Passion of Jonathan Wade at the Greater Miami Opera (GMO). That same year he performed the role of Rodolfo at the Seattle Opera with Sally Wolf as Mimì. He later sang this role at the Pittsburgh Opera (1994), and Opéra de Montréal (1995 & 1999).

In 1992 Brubaker returned to the GMO as Chevalier Renato des Grieux in Puccini's Manon Lescaut and MacDuff in Verdi's Macbeth (with Mark Rucker in the title role). In December 1992 he was the tenor soloist in Handel's Messiah with the Lancaster Symphony Orchestra. In June 1993 he portrayed the title role in Alexander von Zemlinsky's Der Zwerg at the Spoleto Festival USA; a critically acclaimed role for Brubaker which significantly raised his profile on the international stage. Music critic Tim Page praised his "lyric heldentenor" voice and stated that he "sang the role of the Dwarf with a clarion brilliance that did not preclude subtle characterization, and, indeed, a certain intimacy more usually associated with the art song — all the more remarkable since he was twisted into the shape of a very small, fleshy pretzel for his entire time on stage." At the invitation of Gian Carlo Menotti he reprised this role at the Rome Opera in 1994. The success of this production led to other offers in Europe.

In July 1993 Brubaker appeared at the Opéra de Montréal as Le Chevalier des Grieux in Massenet's Manon with Diana Soviero in the title role. In January 1994 he portrayed Rudolph Valentino in the world premiere of Dominick Argento's The Dream of Valentino at the Kennedy Center with the Washington National Opera. The following summer he performed the lead tenor role in the premiere of Soong-Fu Yuan's opera Return to Paradise which was given only in excerpts as part of the Bronx Summer Music concert series. In November 1994 he portrayed Radamès in Verdi's Aida with Opera Delaware. In March 1995 Brubaker gave a benefit concert for the Lancaster Opera Company in which he performed a program of duets and arias with soprano Geraldine McMillian.

In the summer of 1995 Brubaker portrayed Jimmy Mahoney in Rise and Fall of the City of Mahagonny for his debut at the English National Opera (ENO); returning to the ENO later that year as Don José in Carmen with Louise Winter in the title role and Sian Edwards conducting. Some of his other ENO appearances include Luka Kuzmič in From the House of the Dead (1997), the Prince in Rusalka (1998), and the title role in Peter Grimes (1999). In 1996 he performed the role of Samson to Denyce Graves's Delilah in Camille Saint-Saëns's Samson and Delilah with the Washington Concert Opera. That same year he appeared at the Vancouver Opera as Albert Gregor in The Makropulos Case, and repeated the role of Don José at the Greater Buffalo Opera Company with Carol Sparrow as Carmen.

In summer of 1997 Brubaker returned to the Portland Opera Repertory Theatre as Cavaradossi in Tosca in 1997. In the summer of 1998 he portrayed Boris Grigorjevič in Káťa Kabanová with Marie Plette in the title roles at the Opera Theatre of Saint Louis (OTSL). He returned to OTSL the following year to sing the title role in Verdi's Otello. In September 1999 he performed in a concert of opera excerpts at The Berkshire Choral Festival with the Springfield Symphony Orchestra.

=== 2000s Performances ===
In 2000 Brubaker made his debut at the Paris Opera as Pierre Bezukhov in Francesca Zambello's production of Prokofiev's War and Peace; reprised the part of Peter Grimes with the ENO on tour to the Aldeburgh Festival; and portrayed Mao Tse-tung in the ENO production of Nixon in China. In 2001 he returned to the ENO as Sergei in Lady Macbeth of Mtsensk, and appeared with Opera Bastille in Paris as both the Dwarf in Der Zwerg and Prince Vasily Golitsin in Khovanshchina. He later repeated the role of Prince Vasily Golitsin at the Liceu in 2007; a production which was filmed and released on DVD by Opus Arte. In August 2001 he was the tenor soloist in Robert Schumann's Paradise and the Peri at Avery Fisher Hall given as part of the Mostly Mozart Festival.

In 2002 Brubaker appeared at Opera Bastille as the false Dmitri in Boris Godunov. That same year he performed the role of Bacchus in Ariadne auf Naxos at the Royal Opera House with Petra Lang as Ariadne, and portrayed the title role in Zemlinsky's Der König Kandaules at the Salzburg Festival. He repeated this latter role at the Vienna Volksoper in 2011. In 2003 he alternated with Plácido Domingo in the role of Siegmund in Die Walküre at the Teatro Real in Madrid. That same year he appeared as Guido in Alexander von Zemlinsky's Eine florentinische Tragödie at the Aspen Music Festival under conductor James Conlin, and reprised the role of Peter Grimes with the Canadian Opera Company.

In summer of 2004 he gave his first performance with the Glyndebourne Festival Opera (GFO) as Laca Klemeň in Janáček's Jenůfa with Orla Boylan in the title role. He later sang Laca Klemeň again with ENO in 2009. He returned to the GFO in 2008 to create the role of Don Ygnacio in the world premiere of Péter Eötvös's Love and Other Demons.

In 2005 Brubaker appeared at the Teatro di San Carlo in Naples as Hermann in Pique Dame. In June 2005 he appeared at the Teatro Carlo Felice as Captain Edward Fairfax Vere in Britten's Billy Budd with Dwayne Croft in the title role. The following August he portrayed Alviano Salvago in Franz Schreker's Die Gezeichneten at the Salzburg Festival. He later repeated this role for the opera's first staging in the United States at the Los Angeles Opera in 2010; a production which was recorded for release on CD. In 2006 he returned to the ENO as Albert Gregor in The Makropulos Case which was recorded live for Chandos Records under conductor Charles Mackerras.

In 2007 Brubaker portrayed Herod in Salome at La Scala and the Salzburg Festival. He repeated this role at the Teatro Comunale di Bologna in 2010; a production which was filmed. Other theaters where he appeared as Herod include the Liceu (2009), the Teatro Lirico Giuseppe Verdi (2011, with Ingela Brimberg as Salome), Dallas Opera (2014, with Deborah Voigt as Salome), Santa Fe Opera (2015, with Alex Penda as Salome), the Pittsburgh Opera (2016, with Patricia Racette as Salome), and the Teatro Regio di Turino (2018, with Erika Sunnegårdh as Salome). In February 2007 he portrayed Erik in Der fliegende Holländer at the Teatro Lirico Giuseppe Verdi.

In 2008 Brubaker gave his first performance at the Teatro de la Maestranza in Seville, Spain, as Mephistopheles in Doktor Faust. He subsequently returned to that theater as Loge in Das Rheingold in 2010 and Mime in Siegfried in 2012. In 2009 he appeared at the Deutsche Oper Berlin as The Emperor in Die Frau ohne Schatten. In 2011 he performed the role of the Captain in Alban Berg's Wozzeck at the Santa Fe Opera. In 2012 he portrayed Marco in Italo Montemezzi's rarely staged opera La nave which was given at the Rose Theater inside Jazz at Lincoln Center by Teatro Grattacielo.

=== Late career performances ===
In 2013 Brubaker returned to the NYCO company to portray J. Howard Marshall in the United State premiere of Mark-Anthony Turnage's Anna Nicole at the Brooklyn Academy of Music. That same year he portrayed the clown Canio in Pagliacci at the OTSL with Kelly Kaduce as Nedda. This production was presented in a double bill with Puccini's Il tabarro in which Brubeck was seen as Luigi. In 2014 he performed both The Jailer and The Grand Inquisitor in Luigi Dallapiccola's Il prigioniero at the Liceu, and returned to OperaLancaster as the Witch in Hansel and Gretel. In 2015 he portrayed both the villain Bégearss in John Corigliano's The Ghosts of Versailles and Dr. Bartolo in The Marriage of Figaro with the Los Angeles Opera. That same year he returned to the Washington National Opera as J. Edgar Hoover and Wilmer McLean in Philip Glass's Appomattox.

In 2017 Brubaker gave his first performance at the San Francisco Opera (SFO) as Emperor Altoum in Turandot. He also appeared at the SFO that year as Aegisth in Strauss's Elektra and Guillot de Morfontaine in Massenet's Manon. He returned to the SFO in 2019 to portray the Witch in Hansel and Gretel and Red Whiskers in Billy Budd at the San Francisco Opera. In February 2019 he reprised the role of Aegisth at the Lyric Opera of Chicago with Nina Stemme as Elektra.

=== Personal life ===
Brubaker's second wife is NYCO dancer Jean Barber. They married in 1994. In 2012 they purchased a home in Milford, Connecticut. In 2016 he was a judge for Opera Connecticut's annual singing competition.

== Discography ==
=== Film/Video recordings ===
- Sergei Prokofiev: War and Peace. Filmed live at the Opera Bastille in March 2000; directed by Francesca Zambello. Brubaker as Count Pierre Bezukhov. Released on TDK DVD in 2003.
- Franz Schreker: Die Gezeichneten. Filmed live at the Salzburg Festival in 2005 with conductor Kent Nagano. Directed by Nikolaus Lehnhoff. Released on DVD by Euro Arts in 2009.
- Modest Mussorgsky: Khovanschina. Filmed live at the Liceu in May 2007 with conductor Michael Boder. Brubaker as Vasily Golitsyn. Released on DVD in 2008 by Opus Arte.
- Richard Strauss: Salome. Filmed live at the Teatro Comunale di Bologna in 2010 with conductor Nicola Luisotti. Brubaker as Herod. Released on DVD by Arhaus Musik in 2014.
- John Adams: Nixon in China. Recorded live for movie theatres as part of the Metropolitan Opera Live in HD series in 2011. Brubaker portrays Chairman Mao. Released on DVD in 2011 by Nonesuch.
- Giacomo Puccini: Gianni Schicchi; Produced by the MET Opera Guild with Metropolitan Opera singers. Recorded live in May 1993 at Hunter College. Brubaker as Rinuccio. (Originally released on VHS. Viewable on YouTube)

=== CDs ===
- Leonard Bernstein: Candide. Recorded by the New York City Opera in 1985 with John Mauceri, conductor. Brubaker is listed as singing "smaller roles" (The Man, The Lion), Released by New World Records. Winner of the Grammy Award for Best Opera Recording in 1987.
- Richard Wagner: Die Meistersinger von Nürnberg. Recorded live for the Metropolitan Opera radio broadcasts on January 23, 1993 with James Levine, conductor. Brubaker as Zorn. Released on CD in 2002 by Loft Recordings.
- Richard Strauss: Ariadne auf Naxos. Recorded live at the Metropolitan Opera on March 20, 1993 with Ion Marin, conductor. Brubaker as Scaramuccio. Originally recorded for Metropolitan Opera radio broadcasts. Released on CD by the Texaco-Metropolitan Opera International Radio Network
- Thomas Beveridge: Yiskor Requiem; – Academy of St. Martin in the Fields; Sir Neville Marriner, conductor. Brubaker is a tenor soloist. Released by Naxos / Milken Archive of American Jewish Music in 2000.
- Herman Berlinski: Avodat Shabbat. Recorded April 1, 2000 with the Berlin Radio Symphony Orchestra and conductor Gerard Schwarz. Brubaker is the tenor cantor.Released on CD by the Milken Archive of American Jewish Music.
- Alexander von Zemlinsky: Der König Kandaules. Recorded live in 2002 at the Salzburg Festival with the Deutsches Symphonie-Orchester Berlin and conductor Kent Nagano, Brubaker sings title role. CD released by Andante Records.
- Leoš Janáček: Katya Kabanova. Recorded live in 2006 at the Welsh National Opera with Carlo Rizzi, conductor. Brubaker as Boris Grigoryevich. Released on CD by Chandos Records in 2007.
- Leoš Janáček: The Makropulos Case; English National Opera, Sir Charles Mackerras, conductor; recorded live at the London Coliseum in May 2006; released by Chandos Records in 2007.
- Franz Schreker: Die Gezeichneten. Recorded live in 2010 at the Los Angeles Opera with James Conlon, conductor. Brubaker as Alviano. Released on CD by Bridge Records in 2014.
