= Paul Spencer Adkins =

Paul Spencer Adkins (born June 30, 1951) is an American tenor and voice teacher. He began a career as an opera singer and concert tenor in the mid 1970s, and was particularly active in staged operas in the United States from the late 1970s into the early 1990s. He has since devoted his time to concert work and teaching singing. He was a member of the voice faculty at the University of the Arts, Philadelphia from 1998 until its closure in 2024. He maintains a private studio in Philadelphia.

== Early life and education ==
Paul Spencer Adkins was born in Monongahela, Pennsylvania on June 30, 1951. The oldest of four siblings in the Adkins family; he has three younger sisters. His father, Paul C. Adkins, was a bass-baritone who performed with the Pittsburgh Civic Light Opera during the early years of that organization, and subsequently worked as a minister in the African Methodist Episcopal Church. His parents lived in Monongahela until moving to Richmond, Virginia in 1981 where Paul C. began working as a district manager for the United Parcel Service.

As a child, Paul Spencer sang as a boy soprano. He graduated from Monongahela High School in 1969. While a high school student he studied singing first with Walter E. Weaver and later bass-baritone Lee Cass at Carnegie Mellon University. He studied voice with Rose Crain at West Virginia University where he graduated with a bachelor's degree in music education. He pursued further studies at the Academy of Vocal Arts (AVA) in Philadelphia. His voice teacher at AVA was Dorothy DiScala.

== Career ==
=== Early performances ===
In 1976 Adkins performed the part of one of the tourists in the world premiere of Menotti's The Hero with the Opera Company of Philadelphia (OCOP). In 1977 he portrayed the title role in Charles Gounod's Faust with Opera Delaware. In 1978, 1989, and 1990 he was a soloist in Handel's Messiah with the Philadelphia Orchestra at the Academy of Music. In April 1978 he was a soloist with the Buffalo Philharmonic in a concert of music by Richard Rodgers.

In 1979 Adkins was a soloist in Michael Tippett's A Child of Our Time with the composer conducting the Syracuse Symphony Orchestra. That same year he was a soloist in Beethoven's Symphony No. 9 with the Des Moines Symphony in the newly built Civic Center of Greater Des Moines. In 1980 he was a soloist in excerpts from Gounod's Faust with the American Symphony Orchestra. On May 9, 1980 he sang the title role in the United States premiere of Franz Schubert's Fierrabras at the Walnut Street Theatre; a production mounted by AVA with Adkins as a guest alumnus performer.

In 1981 Adkins was one of multiple winners of the first Luciano Pavarotti International Voice Competition held in Philadelphia. That same year he performed a minor role in OPOC's production of Rossini's Mosè in Egitto, and was a soloist in Kurt Weill's The Berlin Requiem and Carl Orff's Carmina Burana with the New York Choral Society at Carnegie Hall. On New Years Day 1982 he gave his first performance with the Sarasota Opera (then Asolo Opera) as Rodolfo in Puccini's La bohème. Later that year he was a soloist in Haydn's The Creation with the Philadelphia Singers, and gave his first performance with the Pittsburgh Opera as Arturo Bucklaw in Lucia di Lammermoor with Cristina Deutekom in the title role.

On April 19, 1982 Adkins was a soloist in the official premiere of Undine Smith Moore's oratorio Scenes from the Life of a Martyr with the Richmond Symphony Orchestra. In November 1982 he returned to Opera Delaware as Mario Cavaradossi in Tosca with Kristine Ciesinski in the title role. In 1983 he performed the role of the Italian Singer in Richard Strauss's Der Rosenkavalier at Tulsa Opera with Gwendolyn Jones as Octavian, and gave his first performance with Virginia Opera as Macduff in Verdi's Macbeth. In 1984 he appeared as Elijah Muhammad in a workshop performance of X: The Life and Times of Malcolm X at the Trocadero Theatre while the opera was in development. That same year he portrayed Tamino in The Magic Flute with Michigan Opera Theatre.

In 1985 Adkins was the tenor soloist in Verdi's Requiem with the Royal Stockholm Philharmonic Orchestra; gave his first performance with Chicago Opera Theater as Nadir in Les pêcheurs de perles; and portrayed the Duke of Mantua in Rigoletto with the Pennsylvania Opera Theater. He returned to the Pennsylvania Opera Theater as Count Almaviva in The Barber of Seville (1987). On December 7, 1985 he portrayed the title role in the world premiere of the revised version of Virgil Thomson's Lord Byron at the New York Repertory Theatre.

=== Mid-career performances ===
In 1986 Adkins portrayed the Duke of Mantua in Rigoletto with the Greater Miami Opera with Harolyn Blackwell as Gilda; reprised the role of Strauss's Italian Singer at the Orlando Opera; repeated the role of Verid's Macduff at Opera Columbus; and performed the role of Pinkerton in Madama Butterfly with the Hollybush Opera Theatre. He performed the role of Garibaldi in the final act of The Civil Wars: A Tree Is Best Measured When It Is Down at the Brooklyn Academy of Music as part of the 1986 Next Wave Festival. He reprised the role of Pinkerton at the Connecticut Opera in 1987 with Jean Glennon in the title role.

In 1987 Adkins was a soloist in Beethoven's Symphony No. 9 with the Hoboken Chamber Orchestra and the Pro Arte Chorale given at Alexander Hall on the campus of Princeton University; a work he later repeated at Princeton in 1992 in concert with Princeton Pro Musica. In the summer of 1987 he performed the role of Erik in Richard Wagner's Der fliegende Holländer at the Des Moines Metro Opera (DMMO). He subsequently returned to DMMO as Calaf in Puccini's Turandot (1988) and the title role in Offenbach's The Tales of Hoffmann (1989).

In 1988 Adkins returned to Virginia Opera as Le Comte des Grieux in Massenet's Manon, and performed the role of Cassio in Otello with the Greater Miami Opera with Ermanno Mauro in the title role and Diana Soviero as Desdemona. In 1989 he performed Mario Cavaradossi to Patricia Craig's Tosca with the Boston Lyric Opera; and repeated the role of the Duke of Mantua at Cleveland Opera with Richard J. Clark as Rigoletto; and sang Le Comte des Grieux to Evelyn de la Rosa's Manon at the Sacramento Opera.

Adkins repeated the role of the Duke of Mantua with the Greater Buffalo Opera Company (1991) and Opera Theatre of Rochester (1993). In 1991 he gave a recital at the University of Tennessee. In 1993 he sang in a concert of opera excerpts with Lake George Opera; and starred in a concert performance of Felix Mendelssohn's unfinished opera Loreley give at Lehigh University. In 1994 he sang the part of Einstein in a concert version of Die Fledermaus with the Saginaw Bay Symphony Orchestra at the Temple Theatre.

In the mid 1990s Adkins performed as a member of the chamber group, the Classical Apple Ensemble. In 1995 he sang a concert of spirituals and was the tenor soloist in Samuel Coleridge-Taylor's Hiawatha's Wedding Feast with the Inland Empire Symphony (IES). In May 1995 he was the tenor soloist in the world premiere of David Sampson's The War Prayer which was given by Princeton Pro Musica at Princeton University. In 1996 he sang a concert of opera duets and arias with soprano Christine Donahue and the Richmond Symphony Orchestra; repeating a program they had sung earlier with the IES in 1995.

=== Later performances ===
Adkins was the tenor soloist in Handel's Messiah with the Richmond Symphony in 1998, and at the at the Renaissance Theatre with the Mansfield Symphony Orchestra in 2001. In 1999 he performed with soprano Lisa Daltirus in the Philly Pops "Blue Chip Broadway" concert, and was a soloist with the Paragon Ragtime Orchestra. He performed with the Philly Pops again the following year in the "That's Entertainment" concert. In 2000 he performed the role of Turiddu in a concert version of Cavalleria rusticana with the Hilton Head Symphony Orchestra.

From 2000 to 2002 Adkins was an Artist-In-Residence with the Ebony & Ivory organization in Racine, Wisconsin. In 2002 he gave a concert at the University of Scranton. In 2003 he was the featured soloist in the concert "Voices of Joy" with the Omaha Symphony. That same year he was appointed Artist-in-Residence in Tri-Cities, Michigan in a program organized by S. C. Johnson & Son in partnership with the Ebony & Ivory organization which brought Adkins to Michigan for performances, talks, and other forms of community outreach through music in area schools and churches. He returned as a resident artist for this program in 2004, and 2005.

Adkins was a soloist in Haydn's Missa Sancti Nicolai with the Lancaster Chamber Singers in 2008. He was still singing in public concerts as late as 2012 when he performed with Michael Sylvester and William Joyner at a concert in Danbury, Connecticut.

=== Teaching ===
Adkins began working as a voice teacher in the 1970s, and long maintained concurrent careers as performer and educator. He was an Artist-in-Residence at the University of Wisconsin–Madison (UWM) where he performed Bacchus in the school's 1990 production of Ariadne auf Naxos in addition to taking on teaching responsibilities. He gave a faculty recital at the UWM in 1991 with pianist Melinda L. Moser and organist John Chappell Stowe.

In 1998 Adkins joined the voice faculty of the University of the Arts, Philadelphia where he taught until the school's closure in 2024. He taught masterclasses at Carthage College (2001) and Saginaw Valley State University (2005). His 50th year as a voice teacher was celebrated by a public concert featuring his many student, both current and past, in 2025. He maintains a private voice studio in Philadelphia. Some of his students include Broadway musical performers Amanda Jane Cooper and Nathaniel Stampley, and songwriter and composer Benj Pasek.

== Television appearances ==
Adkins starred on television in the The Musical Legacy of Roland Hayes; a 1990 PBS documentary film about African-American tenor Roland Hayes which he produced in addition to appearing on camera as an interviewer and performer. He appeared multiple times as a guest soloist on the Hour of Power television program, and was also a guest performer in the children's opera "A Star for Kitty" on Mister Rogers' Neighborhood.

== Personal life ==
In 1983 Adkins married Mary Bowen. They have three children.
