= Gregory Stapp =

American bass and voice teacher

Gregory Stapp (born May 19, 1954) is an American bass who has performed actively in concerts and operas internationally for more than 35 years. He has had a particularly fruitful partnership with the San Francisco Opera, portraying more than 30 roles with the company since 1980. He has also worked actively as a private voice teacher and as a teacher of master classes at a number of universities. He is the current Second Vice President of the American Guild of Musical Artists.

== Early life and education ==
Gregory Stapp was born in Denver, Colorado on May 19, 1954. He attended Doull Elementary School, Kunsmiller Junior High School, and Cherry Creek High School in Denver. He earned a Bachelor of Music from Loretto Heights College in 1976 where was a pupil of George Lynn, the former music director of Westminster Choir College. He pursued further studies in opera at the Academy of Vocal Arts in Philadelphia from 1976-1980. He studied with Dorothy DiScala at the school and earned an Artist’s Diploma in 1980. In the summer of 1979 he pursued graduate work at the Jacobs School of Music at Indiana University Bloomington where he was a student of longtime Metropolitan Opera star Margaret Harshaw and also worked as a Graduate Assistant in voice. He also studied singing with Janet Parlova, Jerome Hines and Judith Natalucci.

== Career ==
While at the AVA, Stapp appeared in 15 student opera productions, including portraying the part of Charlemagne in the United States premiere of Franz Schubert's Fierrabras at the Walnut Street Theatre on May 11, 1980. He was also active with professional musical organizations in Philadelphia. He made his first appearance with the Philadelphia Orchestra in July 1978 as Il Tio Sarvaor in Manuel de Falla's La vida breve with Enriqueta Tarrés as Salud and Rafael Frühbeck de Burgos conducting. That summer, he made his concert debut with the Opera Company of Philadelphia; and that November, he made his OCP stage debut as Il conte di Ceprano in Giuseppe Verdi's Rigoletto with Sherrill Milnes in the title role, June Anderson as Gilda, and conductor Gerhard Samuel.

In fall 1980 Stapp joined the San Francisco Opera's San Francisco/Affiliate Artists-Opera Program, making his stage debut with the company as the Second Armored Man in Wolfgang Amadeus Mozart's The Magic Flute. After a series of smaller roles with the company, he portrayed his first larger role with the SFO, Raimondo in Gaetano Donizetti's Lucia di Lammermoor in November 1981. He continued to perform periodically with the company up through 2005, appearing in such parts as Achillas in Giulio Cesare, Brander in La Damnation de Faust, Dansker in Billy Budd, Friar Lawrence in Roméo et Juliette, Lodovico in Otello, the Parson in The Cunning Little Vixen, Pluto in Il ballo delle ingrate, and the Priest in Lady Macbeth of the Mtsensk District among others. Fifteen of his performances with the SFO were broadcast nationally on NPR.

Stapp has also sung roles with more than 60 other opera companies in the United States. In June 1983 he performed the role of Totor in the world premiere of Frederick Delius's Margot la Rouge at the Opera Theatre of St. Louis. He made his debut at the New York City Opera in November 1983 as Nourabad in Georges Bizet's Les pêcheurs de perles with Jon Garrison as Nadir. He later returned to the NYCO to portray Sarastro in The Magic Flute in 1987, a performance which was broadcast nationally on PBS's Great Performances. On November 15, 1986 he performed the role of Emperor Altoum in the United States premiere of Ferruccio Busoni's Turandot at the Connecticut Grand Opera with Patricia Craig in the title role. In 1993 he portrayed John MacKay in the world premiere of Bern Herbolsheimer's Mark me Twain at the Nevada Opera.

Stapp remains active as a performer and teacher; a notable student being baritone Stephen Dickson. He taught voice, conducting and music history at Notre Dame de Namur University in Belmont, California (where he conducted Mozart's The Marriage of Figaro) until 2015, when he moved his private vocal studio to Monument, Colorado.
