= Marilyn Mims =

American operatic soprano (born 1954)

Marilyn Mims (born Marilyn Lavinia Williamson, September 8, 1954) is an American soprano and voice teacher who had a performance career in operas and concerts from the mid 1970s until as late as 1997. A native of Collins, Mississippi, she graduated with a degree in voice from University of Southern Mississippi. She began her career performing with smaller regional opera companies in the United States; making her debut in 1976 with the Hattiesburg Civic Light Opera as Rosina in The Barber of Seville with a cast that included her husband, the baritone and music educator Lloyd Lee Mims. In 1979 she relocated with her husband to Louisville, Kentucky and there became a resident artist at the Kentucky Opera in the early 1980s while simultaneously studying music at Southern Baptist Theological Seminary (SBTS). She also worked as an apprentice artist with the Des Moines Metro Opera in 1981-1982. From 1984-1986 she was a graduate student and vocal instructor at the Jacobs School of Music at Indiana University where she studied with soprano Virginia Zeani.

In 1986 Mims' career was forwarded significantly after she won the Metropolitan Opera National Council Auditions (MONCA). She was a regular performer at the Metropolitan Opera from 1988 to 1992, and also performed as a leading soprano with other opera companies in the United States, Canada, South America, and Europe in the decade after winning the MONCA. She notably sang the role of Ortlinde on the Met's 1987 recording of Die Walküre under James Levine for Deutsche Grammophon, which won the Grammy Award for Best Opera Recording. She was particularly known for her performances of Violetta in La traviata and Donna Anna in Don Giovanni; roles which she sang at the Met and as a guest artist with many other companies. Her performance career was cut short after she was diagnosed with endometriosis in 1995. She taught on the voice faculty of SBTS from 1995 until 2000 when she and her husband both joined the faculty of Palm Beach Atlantic University (PBAU). As of 2026, she is still teaching at PBAU. Her daughter is operatic soprano Virginia Mims.

== Early life ==
The daughter of James Ohlia Williamson and Louise Williamson (later Atwood), Marilyn Lavinia Williamson was born in Collins, Mississippi on September 8, 1954. She was the youngest of six children in the Williamson family. She was educated at Collins Elementary School and Collins High School (CHS). A a child she studied voice and piano with Janice Bullock. At CHS she sang in the glee club which was led by music teacher Dorothy A. Smith. Marilyn also studied piano privately with Smith while in high school. She was a member of Williamsburg Baptish Church in Collins in her growing up years. In 1972 she was crowned queen in the beauty pageant at the South Mississippi District Livestock Show when she was a senior at CHS. That same year she was third runner up in the Miss Mississippi Teenager Pageant. In her youth she was inspired to seriously study opera out of admiration of Leontyne Price who grew up thirty miles away from Mims' hometown.

== Education ==
Marilyn began her undergraduate studies at the University of Southern Mississippi (USM) in the 1972-1973 academic year. She originally was a piano major but switched to studying singing. Her voice teacher at USM was Robert Mesrobian. She formed a romantic attachment to fellow USM music student, the baritone Lloyd Lee Mims. They married in October 1973 during her sophomore year at USM. At the time of their marriage Lloyd was both music and youth minister at Collins Baptist Church.

In 1974 Mims portrayed the role of Adele with her husband Lloyd as Dr. Falke in USM's production of Die Fledermaus which was directed by Mesrobian. It was filmed for broadcast on a local public television station. She also performed with USM's opera theatre program as Musetta in La bohème and the title role in The Ballad of Baby Doe. She was also an oratorio soloist in USM's presentations of Joseph Haydn's The Seasons (1975), Handel's Messiah (1975, conducted by James Yestadt), and Orff's Carmina Burana (1976). She graduated from USM with a bachelor's degree in voice in 1976.

In 1979 Mims and her husband moved to Louisville, Kentucky so that Lloyd could pursue a doctorate degree at Southern Baptist Theological Seminary (SBTS). Marilyn initially supported them by working as an elementary school music teacher in Shively, Kentucky. By 1980 she was also pursuing graduate studies in music at SBTS and her husband was teaching on the faculty at that school. She studied singing at SBTS with Dr. Jay W. Wilkey. She concurrently taught voice on the faculty at the Louisville Academy of Music, and was co-music director with her husband of Kenwood Baptist Church in Louisville. She was the soprano soloist in SBTS's presentations of Johannes Brahms's A German Requiem (1980) Felix Mendelssohn's Elijah (1982), and Michael Tippett's A Child of Our Time (1984).

In 1982 she participated in a public masterclass taught by James McCracken. She later studied vocal performance at the Jacobs School of Music at Indiana University (IU) where she was a pupil of renowned soprano Virginia Zeani. She began her studies at IU in 1984 after being appointed to an associate instructorship which paid for her graduate tuition in exchange for her teaching voice lessons to undergraduate students. She portrayed Mimì in IU's 1985 production of La bohème which was directed by James Atherton and conducted by Bryan Balkwill. This was followed by the role of Donna Elvira in IU's 1986 production of Mozart's Don Giovanni with Ron Peo in the title role.

== Early opera career ==
Mims made her professional opera debut in 1976 at the Saenger Theatre with the Hattiesburg Civic Light Opera (HCLO) as Rosina in The Barber of Seville with her husband in the role of Bartolo. She subsequently performed with the HCLO as Baroness Elsa Schraeder in The Sound of Music (1977). She and her husband gave a joint recital in Jacksonville, Mississippi in 1978 sponsored by the MacDowell Music Club. That same year she won third place in a singing competition held by Mobile Opera. In 1979 she won first prize in an opera competition held by the Mississippi Opera. In 1981 she was a finalist in the Lyric Opera of Chicago auditions.

In 1980 Mims made her debut with the Kentucky Opera (KO) as Pamina in The Magic Flute. She subsequently was hired as a full time resident artist with the KO; a post she held from 1982 to 1984. Roles she performed with the KO included Frasquita in Carmen (1981) with Hilda Harris in the title role; Sarah Good in Robert Ward's The Crucible (1981); the Naiad in Ariadne auf Naxos (1981); a snake charmer in The Bartered Bride (1982); Kate Pinkerton in Madama Butterfly (1982); Barbarina in The Marriage of Figaro (1982); Madeline in Henry Mollicone's The Face on the Barroom Floor (1982 and on tour in 1983); and Zerlina in Don Giovanni (1983-1984). In 1985 she was the soprano soloist in the KO and Louisville Ballet's co-production of Carmina Burana.

Mims portrayed Giannetta in Donizetti's L'elisir d'amore and Zerlina in Don Giovanni at the Des Moines Metro Opera in 1982 having previously worked as an aprrentice artist with that company in 1981. In 1984 she was the soprano soloist in the Louisville Ballet's production of Andrée Howard's La Fête étrange at the Kentucky Center for the Arts; a work she repeated with the company on tour at the Brooklyn Center for the Performing Arts in 1985. In 1985 she won second prize at the Mae M. Whitaker International Competition in St. Louis, and in 1986 she won first prize in the Baltimore Opera Company's international singing competition. She also performed with the Miami Opera in her early career.

== Later opera career ==
In 1986 Mims was the winner of the national level Metropolitan Opera National Council Auditions (MONCA). She had competed in this competition for several years; first winning the district level of the competition in 1979. She was a district winner and regional finalist in the MONCA in 1982, and again in 1984. In 1985 she was a semi-finalist at the national portion of the MOCA and scheduled to sing in the finals of the competition but illness prevented her from competing. To make up for the missed opportunity, the Met offered her a spot to compete in the 1986 finals of MONCA without having to re-compete in the earlier rounds of the competition. After winning the MONCA, her first work with the Metropolitan Opera ("the Met") was recording the role or Ortlinde in Die Walküre with the Met's orchestra conducted by James Levine in 1987 for the Deutsche Grammophon label. That recording won a Grammy Award.

In 1987 Mims portrayed both the title role in Donizetti's Lucia di Lammermoor and Donna Anna in Mozart's Don Giovanni with Virginia Opera (VO). That same year she appeared for the first time with the New York City Opera as Violetta in Verdi's La traviata, and repeated the role of Lucia at the Kentucky Opera. In January 1988 she made her debut at the Met as Rosalinde in Die Fledermaus opposite Thomas Allen as Eisenstein and Judith Blegen as Adele. Later that year she repeated the role of Rosalinde at the Michigan Opera Theatre; sang the role of Isabelle in Meyerbeer's Robert le Diable with the Opera Orchestra of New York at Carnegie Hall, portrayed Fiordiligi in Mozart's Così fan tutte at the Santa Fe Opera, performed the role of Constanze in Mozart's Die Entführung aus dem Serail at the Hawaii Opera Theatre; and reprised the role of Donna Anna with the Canadian Opera Company.

Mims continued to sing roles at the Met annually through 1992, portraying Lucia (1989), Fiordiligi (1990), Violetta (1990-1992), Constanze (1990 & 1991), Donna Anna (1990-1992), and Gilda in Rigoletto (1992). In 1989 she returned to the VO to portray the title role in Donizetti's Anna Bolena, and performed Donna Anna to Sherrill Milnes's Don Giovanni at the Orlando Opera. In 1990 she made her debut at the San Francisco Opera as Nedda in Pagliacci, and appeared at the Grand Théâtre de Genève in Switzerland as Donna Anna. She returned to San Francisco and Geneva in 1991 as Mozart's Donna Anna. In the 1991-1992 season she performed Donizetti's Anna Bolena at the Municipal Theatre of Santiago in Chile, and sang a concert of opera arias with the Louisville Orchestra. She also sang Anna Bolena in San Francisco in 1992.

Mims repeated the role of Violetta in performances with the New Orleans Opera (1989), Kentucky Opera (1989), the Houston Grand Opera (1990), Mississippi Opera (1991), the Spokane Symphony (1992), and the Florida Grand Opera (1993, then Greater Miami Opera); the latter with Tonio di Paolo as Alfredo. In 1993 she returned to the VO as the soprano soloist in Verdi's Requiem. and portrayed Donizetti's Lucia at the New Orleans Opera. In 1994 she returned to KO as Gilda in Rigoletto with Timothy Noble in the title role; sang Lucia at the Teatro Colón in Buenos Aires; and portrayed Nedda in Pagliacci with Opera Grand Rapids. In 1995 she returned to the Municipal Theatre of Santiago to sing Donna Anna. In 1997 she portrayed Desdemona in Otello at the Kentucky Opera.

== Post-performance career ==
Mims retired from full time performance in 1995 after she was diagnosed with endometriosis. At this time she took a position as artist-in-residence and voice professor at Southern Baptist Theological Seminary (SBTS). At this time her husband was dean of SBTS's School of Church Music and Worship. Both Mims and her husband left SBTS in 2000 to join the faculty of Palm Beach Atlantic University (PBAU) with her husband appointed to the post of dean of the School of Music and Fine Arts. As of 2026 she is still an artist-in-residence and professor of voice at PBAU. Her daughter is operatic soprano Virginia Mims.
