= Monte Pederson =

American opera singer

Monte Pederson (21 August 1958, Sunnyside, Washington – 6 November 2001, Kreuth, Germany) was an American operatic bass-baritone. He sang in leading roles with important opera houses internationally, including La Scala, the Deutsche Oper Berlin, the Lyric Opera of Chicago, the Metropolitan Opera, the San Francisco Opera and the Vienna State Opera. In 1996, he created the role of Gyges in the world premiere of Alexander von Zemlinsky's Der König Kandaules at the Hamburg State Opera. In 2001, he sang the role of Oedipe in George Enesco's Oedipe.
