= Nathaniel Stampley =

American actor

Nathaniel Stampley is an American actor. He has performed in the West End, on Broadway, on tours, and regionally.

== Roles ==
Stampley studied singing with Paul Spencer Adkins. On Broadway, he was a replacement for Old Deuteronomy in the revival of Cats, he played Mister in the revival of The Color Purple, Mufasa in The Lion King, and was in the opening night cast of original production of The Color Purple as Buster, Chief, an ensemble member, and an understudy for Harpo. He also played Mufasa in The Lion King in the West End and on the national tour. He was in the national tour of Ragtime.

Regionally, he was The Baron in the world premiere of the musical LEMPICKA at the Williamstown Theatre Festival, he played Leo in Big Love at Signature Theatre in NYC, has been Henry in First Noel at Classical Theatre of Harlem, Lucas in Abyssinia at the North Shore Music Theatre, Warrior and the Russian Admiral in Pacific Overtures at the Chicago Shakespeare Theater, in Strike up the Band and One Touch of Venus in the Auditorium Theatre’s Ovations! series, in Show Boat at the Sacramento Music Circus, and in Violet, Once on This Island and Big River at the Apple Tree Theatre.

He received a Joseph Jefferson Award for his portrayal of Don Quixote in Man of La Mancha in Chicago, a Joseph Jefferson Award nomination for the role of Robert Kincaid in The Bridges of Madison County, a nomination for the role of Coalhouse Walker Jr in Ragtime at the Marriott Theatre and a nomination in Big River at the Apple Tree Theatre. He was an understudy for the roles of Crown and the title role in the Tony Award-winning 2012 revival of The Gershwins' Porgy and Bess. He played Porgy on the 2013 national tour of the revival.

He played Hatuey in the U.S. premiere of the Music Theatre Group's production of Hatuey: Memory of Fire in September 2018.

== Personal life ==
Stampley is married to Lanette Costas, who he met in the national tour of The Lion King.

== Awards ==
In 2016, he received a Jeff Award in the category Actor in a Principal Role – Musical for Man of La Mancha at the Marriott Theatre.
