= The Hero (opera) =

Opera by Gian Carlo Menotti

- Opera by Gian Carlo Menotti
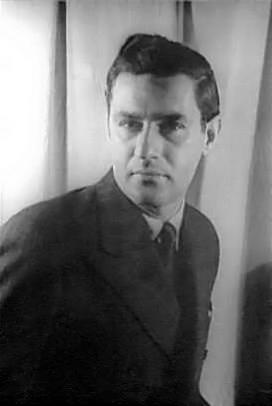
- The composer in 1944
- Librettist: Menotti
- Language: English
- Premiere: June 1, 1976; Philadelphia Academy of Music

The Hero is a three-act opera by Italian-American composer Gian Carlo Menotti commissioned by the Opera Company of Philadelphia, to celebrate the United States Bicentennial. The work premiered at the Philadelphia Academy of Music on June 1, 1976. At this point of his career, Menotti's style of composition, which rejected the avant-garde, was out of favor with the classical music world. Time stated in its review of the opera, "Most of Menotti's music is passable Puccini: melodic, easy to take—and totally beside the point in 1976."

== Roles ==
Role	Voice type	Premiere Cast, 1 June 1976 (Conductor: Christopher Keene)
David Murphy	baritone	Dominic Cossa
Mildred Murphy, David’s wife	mezzo-soprano	Diane Curry
Barbara, David’s cousin	soprano	Nancy Shade
Dr. Briankoff	tenor	David Griffith
The Mayor	bass	Gary Kendall
The Shopkeeper	bass	Walter Knetlar
The Jeweler	tenor	William Austin
The Guide	baritone	Richard Shapp
Husband of tourist couple #1	baritone	Jonathan Reinhold
Wife of tourist couple #1	mezzo-soprano	Fredda Rakusin
Husband of tourist couple #2	tenor	Paul Spencer Adkins
Wife of tourist couple #2	soprano	Hazelita Fauntroy
