= Seymour Schwartzman =

American opera singer

- Born: December 7, 1930; Brooklyn, New York
- Died: January 18, 2009 (aged 78); Plantation, Florida
- Education: Hebrew Union College, Academy of Vocal Arts
- Occupations: Cantor and opera singer

Seymour Schwartzman (December 7, 1930 – January 18, 2009) was an American cantor and opera singer. He was a principal baritone at New York City Opera where he sang over thirty roles and also performed internationally in opera houses and on the concert stage. Among the synagogues where he served as cantor were the Beth Sholom Congregation in Elkins Park, Pennsylvania and Temple Beth Sholom in East Hills, New York.

== Biography ==
Seymour Schwartzman was born in Brooklyn, New York where he father, Abraham Schwartzman, worked as a cantor in a local synagogue. He began singing alongside his father at religious services from the time he was seven years old. He was educated in New York City Public Schools.

Following service in the United States Army, he studied at the School of Sacred Music at Hebrew Union College, while at the same time holding a full-time position as cantor at Temple Beth Emeth in Teaneck, New Jersey. After his graduation in 1953, he served as cantor for the Beth Israel Congregation in Providence, Rhode Island, for three years until moving to Elkins Park, Pennsylvania, where he took up an appointment as the first cantor to the newly built Beth Sholom Congregation

For several years Schwartzman had also studied classical and musical theatre singing with Robert Weede and eventually received a scholarship to the Academy of Vocal Arts in Philadelphia where he studied under Dorothy di Scala. He made his operatic debut as Sonora in La fanciulla del West with the Philadelphia Lyric Opera Company in 1964 and continued to sing in Philadelphia over the next two years both with the Philadelphia Lyric Opera Company and the Little Lyric Opera Company. In 1966 he was one of the four Winners of the American Opera Auditions as well as First Prize winner in the Illinois Opera Guild–WGN Auditions. The American Opera Auditions prize led to his Italian debut at the Teatro Nuovo in Milan as David in L'Amico Fritz that same year. For the next ten years, his primary career would be on the opera and concert stage.

On November 12, 1965, Schwartzman made his debut with New York City Opera as Giorgio Germont in La traviata, and remained with the company until 1975, singing leading baritone roles including Lord Nottingham in Roberto Devereux, Scarpia in Tosca, Tonio in Pagliacci, Michele in Il tabarro, Lord Ashton in Lucia di Lammermoor, Marcello in La bohème, Sharpless in Madame Butterfly, and the title role in Rigoletto. In 1968, he sang the role of John Sorel in Gian Carlo Menotti's The Consul at the Israel Music Festival in Tel Aviv, a role he would reprise in 1969 for San Francisco Opera and in 1971 for Connecticut Opera. Schwartzman had also appeared at San Francisco Opera as Giorgio Germont in La traviata (1967), Tonio in Pagliacci (1967), and Rigoletto (1968).

Although he primarily performed at New York City Opera, Schwartzman also made regular appearances with the Philadelphia Grand Opera Company between 1969 and 1973, singing Alfio in Cavalleria rusticana, Valentin in Faust, David in L'Amico Fritz, Sharpless in Madame Butterfly, High Priest of Dagon in Samson et Dalila, and Giorgio Germont in La traviata. His performances with other opera companies included the Grand Théâtre de Genève where he sang Amonasro in Aida opposite Virginia Zeani in 1969; San Diego Opera where he sang Giorgio Germont in 1970; and Fort Worth Opera where he sang Renato in Un ballo in maschera opposite Plácido Domingo in 1970.

Schwartzman's appearances on the concert stage often centered on the performance of music by Jewish composers. He sang Ernest Bloch's Sacred Service at the Grant Park Concerts in Chicago and the Philharmonic Hall in New York in 1967 and appeared at Mexico City's Palacio de Bellas Artes for the Festival of Jewish Music (Festival de Música Judía) in 1969 and 1972. His 1973 performance in Sholom Secunda's oratorio Yizkor with Richard Tucker (tenor), Bianca Sauler (soprano), and Howard da Silva (narrator) was broadcast by the ABC television network to mark the 30th anniversary of the destruction of the Warsaw Ghetto.

After his retirement from the opera stage Schwartzman returned to the cantorate, while giving occasional concerts. He became the cantor at Temple Beth Sholom in East Hills, New York, in 1978 and served there for the next ten years. In 1988, he and his family moved to Florida where he was appointed cantor at Temple Kol Ami in Plantation, a post he held until his retirement in 1995. During his time at Kol Ami he produced, directed, and starred in several shows at the synagogue, including Fiddler on the Roof and Milk and Honey.

== Recordings ==
- Cantor Seymour Schwartzman: Synagogue Chants and Israeli Songs (LP). Label: Kolee Records (JE 18)
- The Golden Baritone Voice of Seymour Schwartzman (cantorial chants and Jewish songs) (LP). Label: Tikva (T 91)
- The Two Worlds of Seymour Schwartzman (Side 1: Art songs and opera arias; Side 2: Songs by Jewish composers, Arie Abrahamson and Edith Frey Hans) (LP). Label: POM Records (HAL 11/2)
