= Dorothy DiScala =

- Born: c. 1911; Logansport, Indiana
- Died: After 1977
- Genre: Opera
- Occupations: Voice Teacher, Singer
- Spouse: Wesley J. Reber

Dorothy DiScala, sometimes given as Dorothy di Scala (born c. 1911 - died after 1977) was an American voice teacher and singer. A native of Logansport, Indiana, she was trained as a singer at the Accademia Nazionale di Santa Cecilia in Rome. She began her career as a contralto performing on concert stages in Europe and South America. She initially taught singing at the Instituto Nacional de Música de Panamá in Panama City before being mentored as a vocal pedagogue at the Academy of Vocal Arts (AVA) in Philadelphia where she was a pupil of Sidney Dietch. She was a long time faculty member of the AVA where she became head of the voice department. She taught many singers who had careers in opera and on the concert stage. Some of her students included Metropolitan Opera singers John Darrenkamp and Leonard Warren.

== Life and career ==
Dorothy M. DiScala was born in Logansport, Indiana in c. 1911. She studied singing privately in New York City and Paris before attending the Accademia Nazionale di Santa Cecilia in Rome. She worked as a concert singer in Europe and South America, and performed with the San Francisco Opera prior to re-orienting her career toward teaching singing at the Instituto Nacional de Música de Panamá in Panama City.

DiScala returned to the United States to pursue further studies at the Academy of Vocal Arts (AVA) in Philadelphia. Unlike other students who were there with the intent of becoming opera singers, DiScala was recruited as a voice teacher in training. While she completed AVA's opera program under teacher Sidney Dietch, she was simultaneously mentored as a voice pedagogue by him with the intent that she would join AVA's faculty. While a student at AVA she performed in the school's opera productions; portraying Miss Todd in Gian Carlo Menotti's The Old Maid and the Thief (1951) and Mrs. Nolan in Menotti's The Medium (1953).

In 1954 DiScala graduated from AVA, and then joined the voice faculties of both AVA and the Delaware School of Music on Broom Street in Wilmington. That same year she performed with Beverly Sills and Beverly Wolff in the Philadelphia Grand Opera Company's production of L'amore dei tre re by Italo Montemezzi. In 1957 she was the soloist in Manuel de Falla's El amor brujo with the Bucks County Symphony Orchestra conducted by Vernon Hammond.

DiScala succeeded Dietch as head of the voice department at AVA. She taught several successful singers at AVA. Her pupils included sopranos Joy Simpson, Marilyn Mulvey, Virginia Boomer, Alida Stahl Augen, and Sylvia Cooper (later O'Daniel); tenors Paul Spencer Adkins, Michael Magiera, and William Ingle; baritones John Darrenkamp and Seymour Schwartzman; mezzo-sopranos Mary Cross Lueders (a.k.a. Bonnie Cosaro) and Fredda Rakusin; and basses Gregory Stapp and Harry Dworchak. She also taught voice privately with her students including Metropolitan Opera baritone Leonard Warren, tenor George Gray, and organist and conductor Carl Weinrich.

DiScala resided in Ewing Township, New Jersey while teaching at AVA. In 1955 she married Wesley J. Reber. She was still teaching at AVA as late as 1977.
