= Der König Kandaules =

Opera by Alexander von Zemlinsky

- Opera by Alexander von Zemlinsky
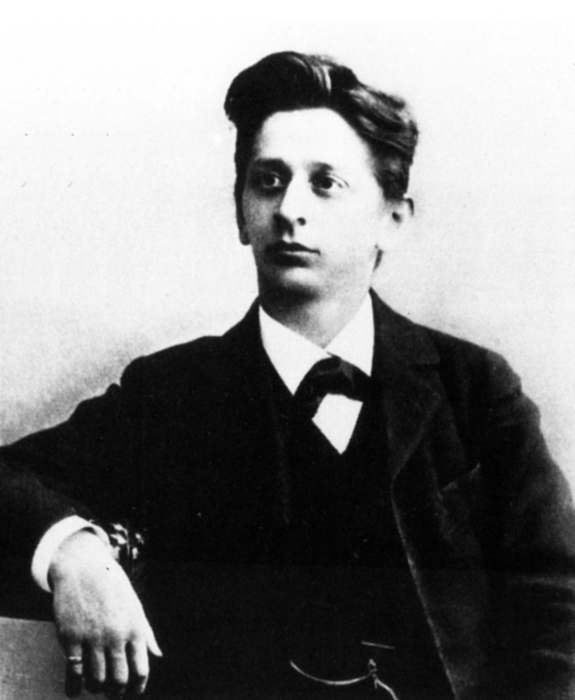
- The composer in 1908
- Translation: King Kandaules
- Librettist: Zemlinsky
- Language: German
- Based on: Le roi Candaule by André Gide
- Premiere: 6 October 1996; Hamburg State Opera

Der König Kandaules (King Kandaules) is an opera in three acts by the Austrian composer Alexander von Zemlinsky. Its libretto was adapted by the composer from Franz Blei's German translation of the play Le roi Candaule by French author André Gide.

== Composition history ==
Zemlinsky completed the short score of the opera in 1936, but the orchestration remained unfinished when the composer, due to his Jewish ancestry, fled the Nazis into exile in the United States in 1938. Zemlinsky hoped for a production at the Metropolitan Opera in New York but when the principal conductor Artur Bodanzky (a former pupil of Zemlinsky's), told him that a nude scene in the second act would make the opera unstageable there, Zemlinsky abandoned the project. He began work on a new opera, Circe, but only the short score of the first act was completed by the time of his death in 1942.

In 1990, the British conductor and musicologist Antony Beaumont discovered that it was possible to complete the orchestration of Der König Kandaules without additional composition. He did so after receiving an official commission from the Hamburg State Opera in 1991.

== Performance history ==
Thus, the work had its belated premiere on 6 October 1996 at the Hamburg State Opera, conducted by Gerd Albrecht. It has enjoyed several productions since, becoming Zemlinsky's third most performed stage-work, statistically ranking only behind his two one-act operas Eine florentinische Tragödie and Der Zwerg.

The opera has been given in various opera houses in Europe and South America:

- May 1997 at the Vienna Volksoper, Asher Fisch conducting
- July/August 2002 at the Salzburg Festival, with Kent Nagano conducting the Deutsches Symphonie-Orchester Berlin (see also section Recordings)
- February 2004 at the Festival de Música de Canarias (concert performance) with Antony Beaumont conducting the Orquesta Sinfónica de Tenerife
- September 2005 at the Teatro Colón in Buenos Aires, Günter Neuhold conducting
- January/February 2006 at the Opéra Royal de Wallonie in Liège, Belgium, Bernhard Kontarsky conducting
- November 2007, a concert performance at the Concertgebouw in Amsterdam, with Bernhard Kontarsky conducting the Radio Filharmonisch Orkest
- January 2009 at the Pfalztheater in Kaiserslautern, Uwe Sandner conducting
- June 2010 at the Bielefeld Opera, Peter Kuhn conducting
- May 2012 at the Teatro Massimo in Palermo, Asher Fisch and Francesco Cilluffo conducting
- April 2016 at the Vlaamse Opera in Ghent, Dmitri Jurowski conducting

== Roles ==
Roles, voice types, premiere cast
Role	Voice type	Premiere cast, 6 October 1996 Conductor: Gerd Albrecht
The King	tenor	James O'Neal
Nyssia, his wife	soprano	Nina Warren
Gyges, a fisherman	baritone	Monte Pederson
Phedros	baritone	Klaus Häger
Syphax	bass	Peter Galliard
Nicomedes	baritone	Mariusz Kwiecień
Pharnaces	bass	Kurt Gysen
Philebos	bass	Simon Yang
Sebas	tenor	Ferdinand Seiler
Archelaos	bass	Guido Jentjens

== Synopsis ==
Place: Lydia
Time: Ancient times

=== Act 1 ===
During the preparations for a feast, the Lydian king Kandaules announces that he wants to show his wife Nyssia unveiled to his favourites for the first time. When a magic ring (that makes whoever wears it invisible) is found in the belly of a fish, the king summons the fisherman Gyges. At first, the fisherman is indifferent, but when it is revealed that his wife Trydo has been unfaithful to him, he kills her in front of all the guests. Kandaules is fascinated and invites Gyges to his castle.

=== Act 2 ===
Kandaules wants to share his immense wealth, including his beautiful wife, with all his friends. He convinces Gyges to use the magic ring in order to behold the naked Nyssia. Events turn against the king, when the invisible Gyges spends the night with Nyssia, who mistakes the fisherman for Kandaules.

=== Act 3 ===
Gyges reveals his true identity to Nyssia and expects to be executed. Nyssia however feels humiliated and betrayed by her husband, and orders Gyges to kill the king. She then crowns Gyges the new king of Lydia.

== Recordings ==
- In 1997 the German record label Capriccio released the world premiere recording: a live recording made on 18 and 25 October 1996 during the initial run of performances at the Hamburg State Opera. Gerd Albrecht conducted the Philharmonisches Staatsorchester Hamburg. The principal roles were sung by James O'Neal (Kandaules), Monte Pederson (Gyges) and Nina Warren (Nyssia).
- In 2004 the Austrian record label Andante released a live recording from the 2002 Salzburg Festival, with Kent Nagano conducting the Deutsches Symphonie-Orchester Berlin. The principal roles were sung by Robert Brubaker (Kandaules), Wolfgang Schöne (Gyges) and Nina Stemme (Nyssia).
