= Jeanne Clemson =

American actress (1922–2009)

- Born: Jeanne Hershberger; 1922; Bedford County, Pennsylvania, U.S.
- Died: September 12, 2009 (aged 87); Lancaster, Pennsylvania, U.S.
- Spouse(s): Charles R. Clemson (1945-2006; his death)

Jeanne Clemson (born Jeanne Hershberger; 1922 – September 12, 2009) was an American artistic director, theater director, actress, educator and preservationist. Clemson was considered instrumental in the efforts to save the Fulton Opera House, located in downtown Lancaster, Pennsylvania, from demolition during the 1950s and 1960s. She is also credited with restoring live theater productions to the Fulton.

The Fulton Opera House is now a National Historic Landmark, designated in 1964.

== Biography ==
=== Early life ===
Clemson was born Jeanne Hershberger in 1922 in Bedford County, Pennsylvania to parents, Fred L. and Olive Bussard Hershberger. She was raised in Everett, Pennsylvania.

She received her bachelor's degree in drama, with a minor in applied music, from Penn State University. She also obtained her teaching certification from Penn State. Clemson further earned her master's degree from the School of Speech at Northwestern University on a scholarship.

She met her future husband, Charles R. Clemson, during her freshman year at Penn State University. The couple married in 1945. They had two children, Cheryl Jeanne and John Alfred.

=== Career ===
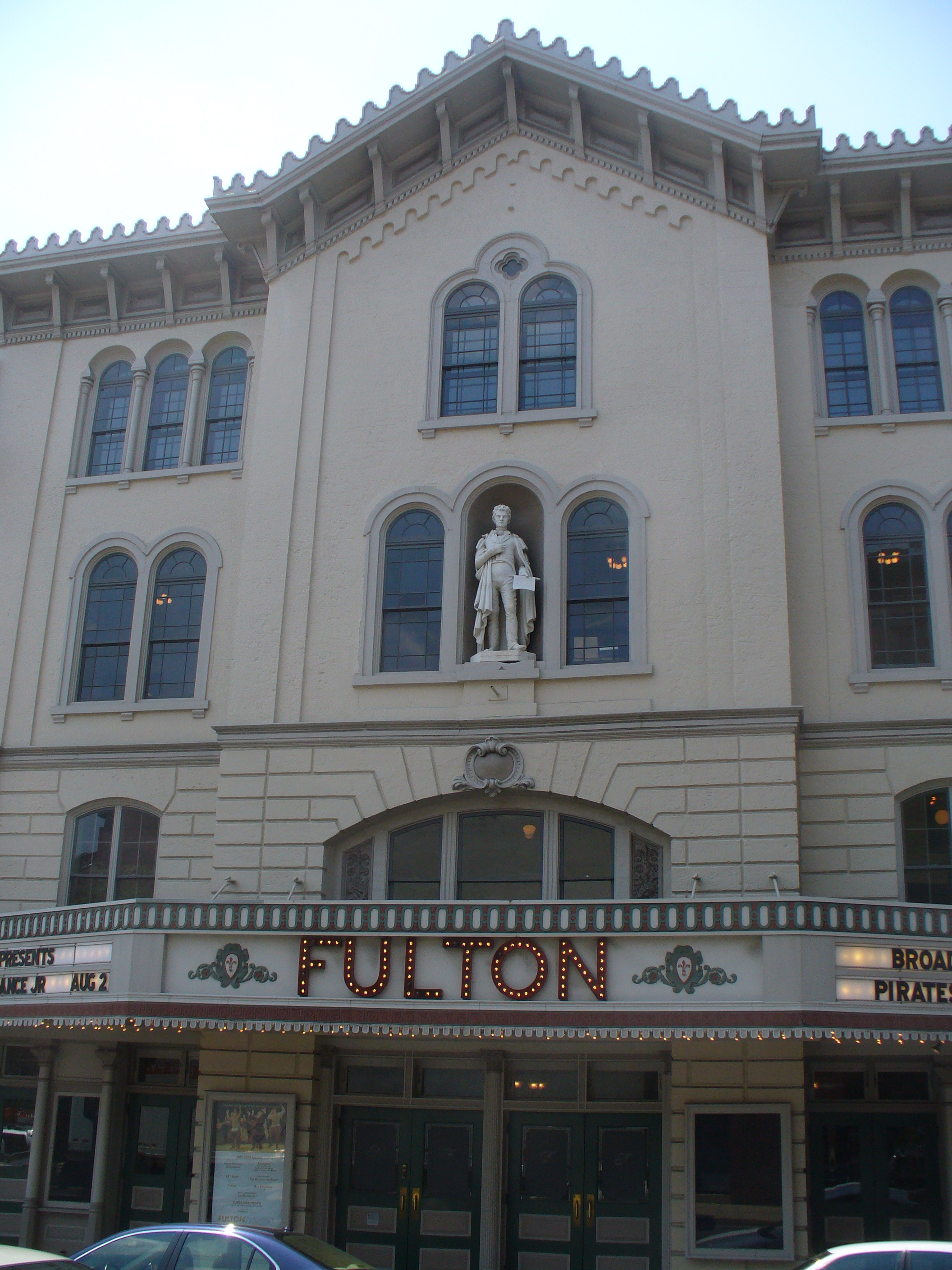
Clemson is credited with saving the Fulton Opera House.

Clemson began her career by teaching music at the National Cathedral School in Washington D.C. The family next relocated to Western Pennsylvania before permanently moving to Lancaster, Pennsylvania, during the mid-1950s.

Clemson, who was a fan of theater, quickly became involved in the local Lancaster theater community and appeared at the Green Room Theatre, which was affiliated with Franklin and Marshall College. Until Clemson joined, the Green Room Theatre had been a male-only theater school. Local theater companies launched one or two theater productions a year at the time.

In the late 1950s, local activists, including Clemson, began to work for the preservation of the Fulton Opera House, a Lancaster Victorian structure constructed in 1870. The Fulton Opera House was in danger of demolition at the time. Clemson and others advocated not just preserving the Fulton Opera House, but also restoring it into a full-time theater again.

Efforts to save the Fulton Opera House and stage productions began to pay off. The 1959 production of Our Town, starring Jeanne Clemson, marked that first time that a live theater production had been staged at the Fulton Opera House in thirty years. In 1964, the Fulton Opera House was added to the list of National Historic Landmarks and further placed on the National Register of Historic Places in 1969. Much of the credit in preserving the opera house went to Clemson. In a 2009 interview with the Intelligencer Journal, Rob Brock, head of the Lancaster Hole-in-the-Wall Puppet Theatre, noted, "I think there is a very good chance the Fulton would not be here without her involvement."

In 1968, Jeanne Clemson and Emily Pat Hoffman founded the Actors Company of Pennsylvania. The Actors Company grew considerable over the next three decades, further fueling local theater in Lancaster and other parts of Pennsylvania. The company expanded the local audience for local theater, as well as the pool of actors and other talent. Clemson, who served as the company's artistic director until 1996, carried out many of the tasks needed for the Actors Company's productions, including local casting, directing and costume design. Clemson's establishment of the Actors Company is also credited with laying the foundation for the establishment of other theater companies within Lancaster County, including the Ephrata Performing Arts Center, Theater of the Seventh Sister and the Independent Eye.

Clemson negotiated and oversaw the merger of the Actors Company of Pennsylvania and the Fulton Theatre Company in 1996. Following the merger, she continued to work with the Fulton Academy, which worked to introduce children to theater and acting. She remained on the Fulton Opera House's board of directors until her death in 2009.

Additionally, Clemson taught and headed the drama department at Lancaster Country Day School. She joined the faculty of Lancaster Country Day in 1962, and remained at the school for 29 years, until her retirement from the school in 1991.

=== Death ===
Jeanne Clemson died from Parkinson's disease on September 12, 2009, at the Homestead Village retirement community in Lancaster, Pennsylvania, at the age of 87. Her husband, Charles Clemson, died in 2006 after 61 years of marriage.

A memorial service was held for Clemson on September 27, 2009, at the Unitarian Universalist Church, followed by a reception at the Fulton Opera House, the Lancaster landmark in which she is credited with preserving.
