= Diane Curry =

American operatic mezzo-soprano (1938–2016)

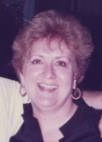
Diane Curry

Diane Curry (February 26, 1938 – November 2016) was an American operatic mezzo-soprano who was particularly known for her performances of the works of Richard Strauss, Richard Wagner, and Giuseppe Verdi. She was notably the mezzo-soprano soloist on the 1987 recording of Verdi's Requiem by the Atlanta Symphony Orchestra & Chorus and conductor Robert Shaw which won the 1988 Grammy Award for Best Choral Performance.

== Life and career ==
The daughter of Frances and Ashton Curry, Curry studied vocal music at Westminster Choir College where she graduated with a B.M. in Music (1960) and a M.M. in Music (1961). She spent the next decade teaching on the voice faculties at Westminster and at the University of Delaware before joining the roster of artists at the New York City Opera where she performed regularly from 1972 to 1981. Roles she performed with the NYCO included Annina in Der Rosenkavalier, Berta in The Barber of Seville, Emma Jones in Street Scene, Enrichetta in I puritani, Magdalena in Die Meistersinger von Nürnberg, Mama Lucia in Cavalleria rusticana, Mary in The Flying Dutchman, Neris in Médée, Olga in Eugene Onegin, the Second Lady in The Magic Flute, Suzuki in Madama Butterfly, and the title role in Carmen among others.

In 1976 Curry created the role of Mildred in the world premiere of Gian Carlo Menotti's The Hero at the Opera Company of Philadelphia. She subsequently returned to Philadelphia regularly through 1995, portraying Geneviève in Pelléas et Mélisande, Herodias in Salome, La Frugala in Il Tabarro, Mistress Quickly in Verdi's Falstaff, the Princess in Suor Angelica, and Zita in Gianni Schicchi.

In 1979 Curry made her debuts at the Opera Theater of Saint Louis as The Voice in Ottorino Respighi's Lucrezia and as Madelon in Andrea Chénier at the Lyric Opera of Chicago. She subsequently returned to Chicago in the roles of Federica in Luisa Miller (1982), Katisha in The Mikado (1983), and La Cieca in La Gioconda (1987). From 1981 to 1986 she performed annually in Seattle Opera's first production of Wagner's The Ring Cycle under director Speight Jenkins, portraying Fricka in Das Rheingold and Die Walküre and Waltraute/Second Norn in Götterdämmerung.

In 1989 Curry made her debut at the Metropolitan Opera as The Nurse in Strauss' Die Frau ohne Schatten under the baton of Christof Perick. She returned to the Met several more times in her career, portraying the Innkeeper in Boris Godunov (1998), the Mother in Lulu (2001), the Housemaid in War and Peace (2002), and the Aunt in Jenůfa (2003). In 1990 she made her debut at the San Francisco Opera as Ulrica in Un ballo in maschera.

Curry has also performed in leading roles internationally, including performances at the Arena di Verona, Bavarian State Opera, Deutsche Oper Berlin, Hamburg State Opera, La Scala, Maggio Musicale Fiorentino, and the Paris Opera among others. In 1976 she made her debut at the Festival dei Due Mondi as Bianca in Benjamin Britten's The Rape of Lucretia. In 1982 she made her debut with the Canadian Opera Company as Mistress Quickly in Verdi's Falstaff.

In 1992 she made guest appearances at the Théâtre Châtelet in Paris as the mother in Dallapiccola's Il Prigioniero, and at the Marseille Opera again as the nurse in Frau ohne Schatten. In 1996 she sang Mère Marie in Poulenc's Dialogues des Carmélites (in a memorial performance for the late conductor Gianandrea Gavazzeni) at the Teatro Filarmonico in Bergamo. Her very extensive repertoire for the stage included roles such as Amneris in Aïda, Meg Page in Falstaff, Cieca and Laura in Ponchielli's La Gioconda, Frugola in Puccini's Il Tabarro, Zita in his Gianni Schicchi, Principessa in Suor Angelica, and Dalila in Samson et Dalila by Saint-Saëns.

Curry died in November 2016, at the age of 78.
