= Frederick H. Robinson =

Frederick Harry Robinson (December 26, 1912 – February 22, 1990) was an American opera director, baritone, and voice teacher. Trained at the Academy of Vocal Arts, he was a concert and opera baritone in Philadelphia, Pennsylvania during the 1930s and 1940s. He also taught singing in Philadelphia, and in the late 1940s moved his voice studio to Lancaster, Pennsylvania. There he co-founded the Lancaster Opera Workshop (later OperaLancaster) in 1952 with his wife, the voice teacher Dorothy Darr Robinson. He was also the founder and first director of the opera program at Muhlenberg College.

== Life and career ==
The son of Harry M. Robinson and Clara E. Robinson (nee Schlag), Frederick Harry Robinson was born in Philadelphia, Pennsylvania on December 26, 1912. By 1925 he was performing as a boy soprano on his own radio program on WCAU radio. In 1931-1932 he was a recurring baritone vocalist on the WIP radio program Matinee Idylls, and in 1933 he had his own program on WIP sponsored by Gimbels. By this time he was working as a baritone on the music staff of Tioga Methodist Episcopal Church in Phiadelphia. He studied singing at the Academy of Vocal Arts from which he graduated in 1938.

In November 1933 Robinson was a soloist with the Choral Society of Philadelphia (CSP) in a concert of music by Handel, Gounod, and Debussy given at the Drexel Institute with conductor William Silvano Thunder. He performed several more times as a soloist with CSP; including in oratorios like Handel's Messiah (1934 & 1939), Gounod's La rédemption (1935), Mendelssohn's St. Paul (1937), Bach's Mass in B minor (1939 & 1940), and Verdi's Requiem (1941). He also performed with the CSP in a concert version of the opera Samson and Delilah (1937, as High Priest of Dagon). After several years absence he returned to perform as a soloist in an all-Brahms program with the CPS in 1948.

In 1934 and 1936 Robinson was a soloist with The Fortnightly Club chorus in concerts at Philadelphia's Academy of Music with Henry Gordon Thunder conducting. By March 1935 he was working as a baritone at Protestant Episcopal Church of the Saviour in Philadelphia. In April 1935 he sang a concert with the Choral Art Choir of Delaware at John Wanamaker Store's with the Wanamaker Organ played by Mary E. Vogt. In 1937 he made his opera debut with the American Opera Company (AOC) as La Balafre in Benjamin Godard's La Vivandière at the Robin Hood Dell.

In the early 1940s Robinson was a staff baritone at Calvary United Methodist Church, Philadelphia. From 1943 to 1946 he served in the United States Army during World War II. After the war, he performed with the AOC again in The Bartered Bride (1948) The Marriage of Figaro (1949, as Antonio), and La bohème (1949, as Schaunard). In 1952 he co-founded the Lancaster Opera Workshop (later known as OperaLancaster) with his wife, Dorothy Darr Robinson. He was the director of this opera company until his retirement in 1977.

Robinson was the founder and first director of the opera program at Muhlenberg College. He was also the author and longtime director of the Vorspiel Drama given at the Ephrata Cloister from 1958 to 1983. One of his notable students was baritone John Darrenkamp. He died in Mount Joy, Pennsylvania on February 22, 1990. His wife died earlier in 1969.
