= OperaLancaster =

Former American opera company

- Formation: 1952
- Dissolved: 2021
- Type: Opera company
- Location: Lancaster, Pennsylvania, United States

OperaLancaster (Note: Sometimes incorrectly spelled as Opera Lancaster.) was an American opera company in Lancaster, Pennsylvania. It was incorporated as a non-profit in 1952 under the name Lancaster Opera Workshop. The company's headquarters were located at 411 W. King St. It was later re-named the Lancaster Opera Company in 1988, and became OperaLancaster after a restructuring of the company in 2004. The company remained active until 2021 when it merged with the Penn Square Music Festival to form the Penn Square Opera, an organization attached to the Penn Square Music Conservatory. From 1960 to 2004 the company's main venue was the Fulton Opera House. Afterwords the company performed at a variety of theaters in Lancaster and the surrounding region. WRCV-TV in Philadelphia profiled the company in an episode of the program Portraits in Music in 1962, and Baltimore's WMAR-TV created a television documentary on the company, Operation Opera, which was broadcast in 1967.

The company was founded as a community theatre organization in 1951 by husband and wife voice teachers Frederick H. Robinson and Dorothy Darr Robinson for the purpose of providing local young talent with opportunities to develop and share their craft at no cost to the developing performer. With the exception of a paid orchestra, the company was an all-volunteer organization that encompassed a mix of professional, pre-professional, and amateur talent. Several young singers in the company went on to successful careers on the opera and concert stage, including tenor Robert Brubaker and baritone John Darrenkamp. Frederick Robinson served as the organization's first artistic director until retiring in 1976. Dorothy Rose Smith led the company from 1977 until her retirement in 1997. Later leaders of the organization included Anne Mason Webber, Scott Drackley, Ellen Fritz, and Darrenkamp.

== History ==
=== Frederick Robinson and the Lancaster Opera Workshop ===
The Lancaster Opera Workshop (LOW) was founded by voice teacher and opera singer Frederick Robinson who had previously been a member of the American Opera Company in Philadelphia. He was trained as a singer at the Academy of Vocal Arts. His wife, voice teacher Dorothy Darr Robinson, also played an instrumental role in establishing the company. The organization's roots can be traced to the late 1940s when the Robinsons moved their voice studio from Philadelphia to Lancaster. Multiple sources state that the LOW was founded in 1952. However, initial auditions for the LOW's first production were held earlier in October 1951.

LOW was officially incorporated as a non-profit organization in June 1952 with Frederick Robinson appointed its first artistic director. He remained in that role for 25 years. He was never paid for his work, and served in this role on a purely volunteer basis. The company's original membership consisted of a mix of young professional and amateur singers who lived in Lancaster and the surrounding region. The organization's mission was to educate young talent, and it provided professional quality training for free to its artists, offering instruction in opera practices, makeup, acting, and stage movement at no charge. Early productions were given on a low budget with just piano accompaniment and minimalist sets. The company initially performed in local school auditoriums, and rehearsed out of the basement in Robinson's home. Throughout its history the singers in the company remained unpaid and were all-volunteer, although the company grew to the point where it hired a professional orchestra for its productions.

LOW's first production was Gian Carlo Menotti's chamber opera The Telephone which was given in January 1952 with Evelyn Doerson and Russell Getz in the cast. This was followed by the company's first larger performance which presented opera scenes from a variety of operas at John Reynolds Junior High School on May 10, 1952 alongside a reprisal of The Telephone. Not long after the company toured its productions of Menotti's The Medium and Kurt Weill's Down in the Valley, including performances at the Academy of Music in Philadelphia. LOW's first presentation of a full length opera was Puccini's La bohème in 1957. The company was able to stage the opera after purchasing relatively new costumes and sets as a very cheap price that had been abandoned by another opera company.

LOW's first production with an orchestra was in 1960 with a production of Puccini's Madama Butterfly with Dorothy Rose Smith in the title role at the Fulton Opera House (FOH). The company was sent a hand-written congratulatory letter from Rudolph Bing of the Metropolitan Opera ("the Met") for this achievement. The FOH became the company's longtime resident venue, although the organization still performed occasionally in other places. Some of the other operas presented at FOH during Robinson's tenure included Puccini's Gianni Schicchi (1965), Mozart's The Marriage of Figaro (1968), Verdi's La traviata (1969), Menotti's The Old Maid and the Thief (1970), Romberg's The Student Prince (1972), Menotti's Help, Help, the Globolinks! (1973), Bizet's Carmen (1974), and Gilbert and Sullivan's The Pirates of Penzance (1976) among others.

On July 14, 1962, LOW was the featured subject of an episode of WRCV-TV's program Portraits in Music. In 1964 the company's production of Humperdinck's Hansel and Gretel was filmed for television broadcast on WGAL. In 1965 the organization purchased an abandoned 90 year-old firehouse on West King St. which became its headquarters. In 1967 the company was the subject of an American Broadcasting Company television documentary, Operation Opera, which was produced by WMAR-TV in Baltimore, Maryland. The documentary was filmed during the LOW's 1967 production of Johann Strauss II's Die Fledermaus at the FOH. In 1971 the LOW began presenting the "Lemonade Concerts", a concert series which ran during the summer months. The annual concert series continued for more than 45 years.

In 1970 LOW gave its first staging of Pagliacci with J. Konrad Fritz as the clown Canio at the FOH. Also in this production was a young Robert Brubaker in his opera debut in the part of Silvio. Brubaker had won the LOW's 1970 voice competition for young singers (an annual event). He later had an international opera career as a tenor of significance. Another young singer who got his start with LOW was baritone John Darrenkamp who had a long career at the Met. Darrenkamp studied voice with Frederick Robinson for many years and made his opera debut with the company. His first role with LOW was the Page in Gian Carlo Menotti's Amahl and the Night Visitors in 1959, an opera he later performed in again with the company as Melchior in 2015. Another performer with the organization was the writer Anne McCaffrey who sang as a soprano in productions and studied stage direction under Frederick Robinson. She later based the character of Robinton, the protagonist of her science fiction novel The Masterharper of Pern, on Robinson.

=== Dorothy Rose Smith leads the Lancaster Opera Workshop ===
Dorothy Rose Smith succeed Robinson as artistic director in 1977. During her twenty-year tenure in that role she staged 38 operas for the company and was conductor for seven. In 1978 she became the first woman in the city of Lancaster to conduct an opera when she led LOW's production of Offenbach's The Tales of Hoffmann with a full orchestra at the Fulton Opera House. Sam Taylor of Lancaster New Era hailed her for "breaking the sex barrier" and referred to her as "Lancaster's Sarah Caldwell". Some of the LOW productions that followed at the Fulton Opera House under Smith's direction included The Yeomen of the Guard (1979), The Magic Flute (1980), Kismet (1980), Smetana's The Bartered Bride (1981), Così fan tutte (1981), Gounod's Roméo et Juliette (1982), H.M.S. Pinafore (1983), Mozart's The Impresario (1984), The Medium (1984), Donizetti's The Elixir of Love (1985), Menotti's The Consul (1985), Orpheus in the Underworld (1986), and Carlisle Floyd's Susannah (1987).

=== Lancaster Opera Company ===
On January 11, 1988, a vote of the organization's membership approved a name change of the organization to the Lancaster Opera Company (LOC). The company's first production under this new name was Puccini's Madama Butterfly in February 1988 at the Fulton Opera House with Elizabeth Trostle as Butterfly. Smith, still in her role as artistic director, both conducted and staged this production. A 1992 LOC production of Douglas Moore's The Ballad of Baby Doe starring Andrea Folan in the title role and John Darrenkamp as Horace Taber was filmed and released on VHS.

Dorothy Rose Smith retired from her post as artistic director in 1997. She was succeeded by Anne Mason Webber. Webber had previously directed the LOC productions of Gilbert and Sullivan's Trial By Jury (1994), The Mighty Casey (1995), and Menotti's The Old Maid and the Thief (1995), and had established an education outreach program in which the LOC brought productions to school children. Some of the operas she directed while artistic director included Iolanthe (1998) and Hansel and Gretel (2000). Also a soprano with the company, she sang the title roles in Rorem's Miss Julie (1999) and Massenet's Manon (2000) at LOC.

Scott Drackley was appointed artistic director of the LOC in 2001. He had worked with the company since 1984 in a variety of capacities, including principal conductor, piano accompanist, and stage director. Some of the operas Drackley either conducted or staged for LOC included Gilbert and Sullivan's The Pirates of Penzance (1988), Frank Loesser's The Most Happy Fella (1989, directed by Smith and conducted by Drackley), Rossini's The Barber of Seville (1989), Verdi's La traviata (1991), Gilbert and Sullivan's The Gondoliers (1991), Stephen Sondheim's A Little Night Music (1992), Puccini's Tosca (1993), Mozart's The Magic Flute (1995), The Tales of Hoffmann (1996), Verdi's Falstaff (1998), Copland's The Tender Land (1999, directed by Mason and conducted by Drackley), Die Fledermaus (2000, directed by Mason and conducted by Drackley), Mozart's The Marriage of Figaro (1993 & 2001), Bizet's Carmen (2002), and La bohème (1990 & 2003).

In its later seasons, the LOC had primarily stopped featuring local talent, and brought in performers from outside the area, changing the company's model from a community theatre organization into a regional theatre. This change proved controversial, and created internal conflicts in the organization which fractured the company. In July 2004 it was announced that the LOC had disbanded after the majority of its board and artistic director Drackley had resigned. The growing disagreements over the direction of the company were largely responsible for the resignations. The company's final performance as the LOC was a production of The Magic Flute at the Fulton Opera House in 2004.

=== OperaLancaster ===
The LOC's sole remaining board member, Ellen Fritz, managed to rebuild the company by raising enough funds to pay off the organization's debt, and raised enough money to renovate the organization's headquarters on West King St. Fritz provided the leadership necessary for the company to resume performances in September 2004 under the name OperaLancaster (OL). The following December the company staged a production of Menotti's Amahl and the Night Visitors, a work which the company repeated annually until as late as 2015.

Other operas staged by OL included Bernstein's Trouble in Tahiti (2005), Gilbert and Sullivan's Trial By Jury (2005), and Bernstein's Candide (2006). In 2007 the company mounted Gilbert and Sullivan's The Mikado for performances at the Ephrata Performing Arts Center, and brought in Metropolitan Opera tenor John Fowler for the company's production of Pagliacci. In 2008 the OL celebrated the 150th anniversary of Puccini's birth by staging productions of Suor Angelica and Gianni Schicchi. In 2009 the company gave performances of Guettel's The Light in the Piazza, Mascagni's Cavalleria rusticana, and Menotti's The Medium.

By 2010 John Darrenkamp was working as OL's artistic director. That year the OL presented the world premiere of Alisa Bair's musical Georgia O'Keeffe: A Woman on Paper at the Roschel Performing Arts Center (RPAC). Other works staged by the OL included Puccini's La bohème (2010), Mozart's Così fan tutte (2011), Puccini's Tosca (2011), Puccini's Madama Butterfly (2012), Gounod's Faust (2013, concert version), and Mentotti's The Telephone (2013). In 2014 tenor Robert Brubaker returned to the OL after not having performed in an opera with the organization for decades in the role of the Witch in Humperdinck's Hansel and Gretel. Brubaker had previously sung this same role at the Met, and would later perform it at the San Francisco Opera in 2019.

The company was still presenting seasons of staged operas as late as 2015 when it offered performances of Donizetti's Don Pasquale at RPAC, Purcell's Dido and Aeneas at the Trust Performing Arts Center, and OL's annual vocal contests were still occurring as late as 2016. That year the company sold its premises on West King St due to financial strains. It was purchased by the Triforce Audio company. The company subsequently had a mailing address of 42 N. Prince St. A concert opera production of two Puccini one-act operas, Il tabarro and Suor Angelica was presented in 2017 and an original opera by local composer James Riggs, The Bartender, was performed at Tellus 360 in the fall of 2017, however low donor contributions and dwindling audiences resulted in a pause in staged productions.

OL continued to appear in the Lemonade Concert Series in 2017. That same year gave a separate gala concert in the Santee Chapel at Lancaster Theological Seminary which featured the company's artist-in-residence, mezzo-soprano Cybele Gouverneur, formerly of Opera San José. In 2019 OL once again staged Amahl and the Night Visitors in a co-production with Berks Opera (BO). The company had earlier collaborated with BO on this same opera in 2015 for a production at The Ware Center after years of the organization giving annual stagings of this opera on its own.

In 2021 OL merged with the Penn Square Music Festival and Penn Square Conservatory of Music to form Penn Square Music, a decision made partly due to the financial pressures created by the Covid-19 pandemic. In 2023 Penn Square Music was re-named Penn Square Opera with Scott Drackley as director of this newly formed organization. The Lemonade Concert Series, no longer attached to the opera company, has continued in the 2020s.

== Notes and references ==
=== Bibliography ===
- Gottlieb, Richard, ed. (2017). "Lancaster Opera Company". The Grey House Performing Arts Directory. Grey House Publishing. ISBN 978-1619259393.
- Odesser-Torpey, Marilyn (2008). Insiders' Guide to Pennsylvania Dutch Country. Globe Pequot Press. ISBN 9780762747863.
- Trachtenberg, Martha P. (2001). Anne McCaffrey: Science Fiction Storyteller. Enslow Publishers. ISBN 9780766011519.
- Wlaschin, Ken (2009). Encyclopedia of American Opera. McFarland & Company. ISBN 978-0-7864-4596-7.
