= Fulton Opera House =

- Fulton Theatre
- U.S. National Register of Historic Places
- U.S. National Historic Landmark
- Pennsylvania state historical marker
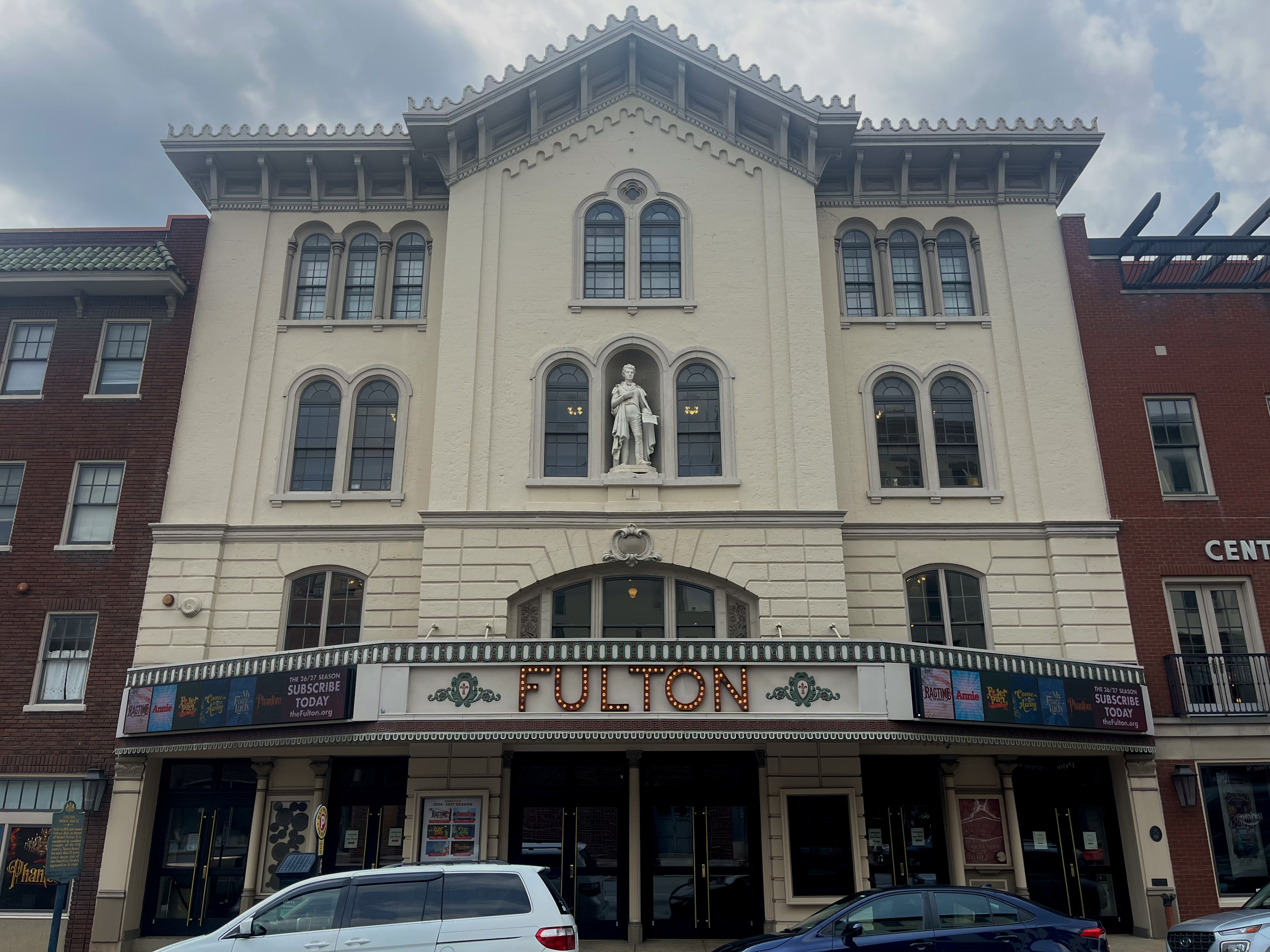
- The Fulton Opera House

- Location within Pennsylvania Location within the United States
- Location: 12-14 North Prince St. Lancaster, Pennsylvania, USA
- Coordinates: 40°2′16.8″N 76°18′29.5″W
- Area: < 1-acre (4,000 m^{2})
- Built: 1852
- Architect: Samuel Sloan, Edwin Forrest Durang
- Architectural style: Victorian
- NRHP reference No.: 69000156

Significant dates
- Added to NRHP: August 11, 1969
- Designated NHL: January 29, 1964
- Designated PHMC: October 11, 1952

The Fulton Opera House, also known as the Fulton Theatre or simply The Fulton, is a League of Resident Theatres class B regional theater located in historic downtown Lancaster, Pennsylvania. It is reportedly the oldest working theatre in the United States. It was designated a National Historic Landmark in 1964.

== History ==
The current structure was built in 1852 on the foundation of Lancaster's former jail, which dated to 1739. In 1763, the twenty surviving members of the Conestoga were placed in protective custody at the jail after fourteen Conestoga were murdered by a settler mob known as the Paxton Boys. On December 27, 1763, thirteen days after the first massacre, the Paxton Boys broke past the sheriff and others defending the jail and murdered all of the remaining Conestoga. None of the attackers were arrested. This became the subject matter for the first plays ever written on American soil: A Dialogue Between Andrew Trueman and Thomas Zealot About the Killing the Indians at Cannestogoe and Lancaster and The Paxton Boys, a Farce.

The building was designated as a site of significance to the Underground Railroad by the National Park Service in 2008. This connection stemmed from an event in 1835 where two fugitive slave women were clandestinely freed from the jail by the sheriff in defiance of the Fugitive Slave Act, allowing them to escape to Philadelphia where they were later captured.

The building was originally called Fulton Hall, named after Lancaster native Robert Fulton. Fulton Hall operated as a town hall and stage for traveling theatrical groups, hosting noted orators including William Jennings Bryan and Lancaster abolitionist Thaddeus Stevens along with famed actors including Edwin Booth and John Wilkes Booth. During the American Civil War, Fulton Hall served as an armory and hospital.

In 1856, Fulton Hall was sold to hotelkeeper Hilaire Zaepfel and showman Blasius Yecker. Zaepfel sold his share of the hall to Yecker in 1869, and Yecker commissioned theatre architect Edwin Forrest Durang to renovate it into a Victorian opera house. Its grand opening took place on October 2, 1873 with a performance of Othello benefitting Civil War widows and orphans. A projection booth was installed in 1930, allowing the theatre to screen movies. Over time, stage productions ceased entirely, and the theatre languished, primarily screening second- and third-run films. Facing demolition, a campaign was launched in the 1950s to restore the theatre. A grand reopening ceremony occurred in 1952, on the 100th anniversary of the theatre's creation, but business remained weak. The 1959 production of Our Town, starring Jeanne Clemson, marked the first time that a live theater production had been performed at the Fulton Opera House in thirty years. In 1962, the Fulton Opera House Foundation was formed, and funds were raised to purchase the building as a nonprofit in the hopes of raising money so that it could be restored. In 1995, the renovation of the theatre was completed; the Fulton would reopen that October with a staging of Steven Sondheim's Company.

The theatre was longtime main venue of the Lancaster Opera Company.

== Building ==
The current building was commissioned by Christopher Hager, a Lancaster merchant and civic leader, and designed by renowned Philadelphia architect Samuel Sloan, who later designed the Lancaster County Courthouse. The original foundation stones from the jail remain at the rear entrance to the Fulton Theatre, along with a plaque commemorating the Conestoga Massacre. On the front façade stands a statue of the Theatre's namesake, Robert Fulton. This statue is a replica of the original wooden statue, which is displayed inside the interior lobby.

The Fulton Theatre was renovated in the early 1870s by noted theatrical architect Edwin Forrest Durang. By 1996, the theatre had been renovated again, with a new 560-seat main stage, practice rooms, and recital stage.

It is one of only two theatres recognized as National Historic Landmarks (the other is the Walnut Street Theatre in Philadelphia).

== Operation ==
A founding member of the League of Historic American Theatres (LHAT), the Fulton is operated by the Fulton Theatre Company, a non-profit organization.

As the Fulton is run on a non-profit basis, it depends on a variety of grants, corporate sponsorship, and private donations to accomplish its mission. The Fulton is an Equity House, operating under agreement with the Actor's Equity Association and the Union for Professional Actors and Stage Managers (which essentially means that its actors and production team are paid per collective bargaining agreements, as opposed to non-equity actors who are not paid per collective bargaining agreements or volunteers) and employs members of the Stage Directors and Choreographers Society and the United Scenic Artists. The Fulton is also a member of ASSITEJ, the International Association of Theatre for Children and Young People.

The Fulton Theatre is home to six mainstage productions per year including previous productions of Disney's Newsies, In The Heights, Agatha Christie's The Mousetrap, some of which are world premier originals (critically acclaimed Lightning Rod, 2005); four family series productions, including the Fulton's own 'Twas the Night Before Christmas, Aladdin, Jack and the Beanstalk, the Musical, and other theatre for young audiences productions; and four studio series productions, including the Pulitzer Prize-winning drama Disgraced, along with other riveting productions like Venus in Fur, Veronica's Room and Other Desert Cities. Although most casting takes place in New York City, regional auditions are also held. While many of The Fulton's regulars are Lancaster County natives who are delighted at the chance to return home to perform, nearly all quickly fall in love with the "Grand Old Lady" and her charm.

In addition to providing a place of employment for professional actors, the Fulton Theatre Company is a complete production facility which employs full-time carpenters, electricians, scenic artists, painters, composers, lighting and sound technicians. Most set pieces and costumes are created in-house or at an adjacent workshop, and makeup, hair, and wigs are created by a full-time designer. The Fulton also maintains a costume shop which provides access to professional quality costumes and props to schools, community theatre companies, and other organizations throughout the region. Its marketing department maintains a website that allows users to browse theatre history, check audition times, and purchase tickets. All posters and print materials, including production programs, are cataloged and archived by the Lancaster Historical Society.

Many famous actors have appeared at the Fulton. In December 1930 Basil Rathbone appeared as Christian St. Obin in A Kiss of Importance. Peter Weir's film, Witness, starring Harrison Ford and Kelly McGillis, much of which represents the lifestyle of the Amish, premiered here in February, 1985.

== See also ==
- List of National Historic Landmarks in Pennsylvania
- National Register of Historic Places listings in Lancaster County, Pennsylvania
