= Jean Périsson =

French conductor (1924–2019)

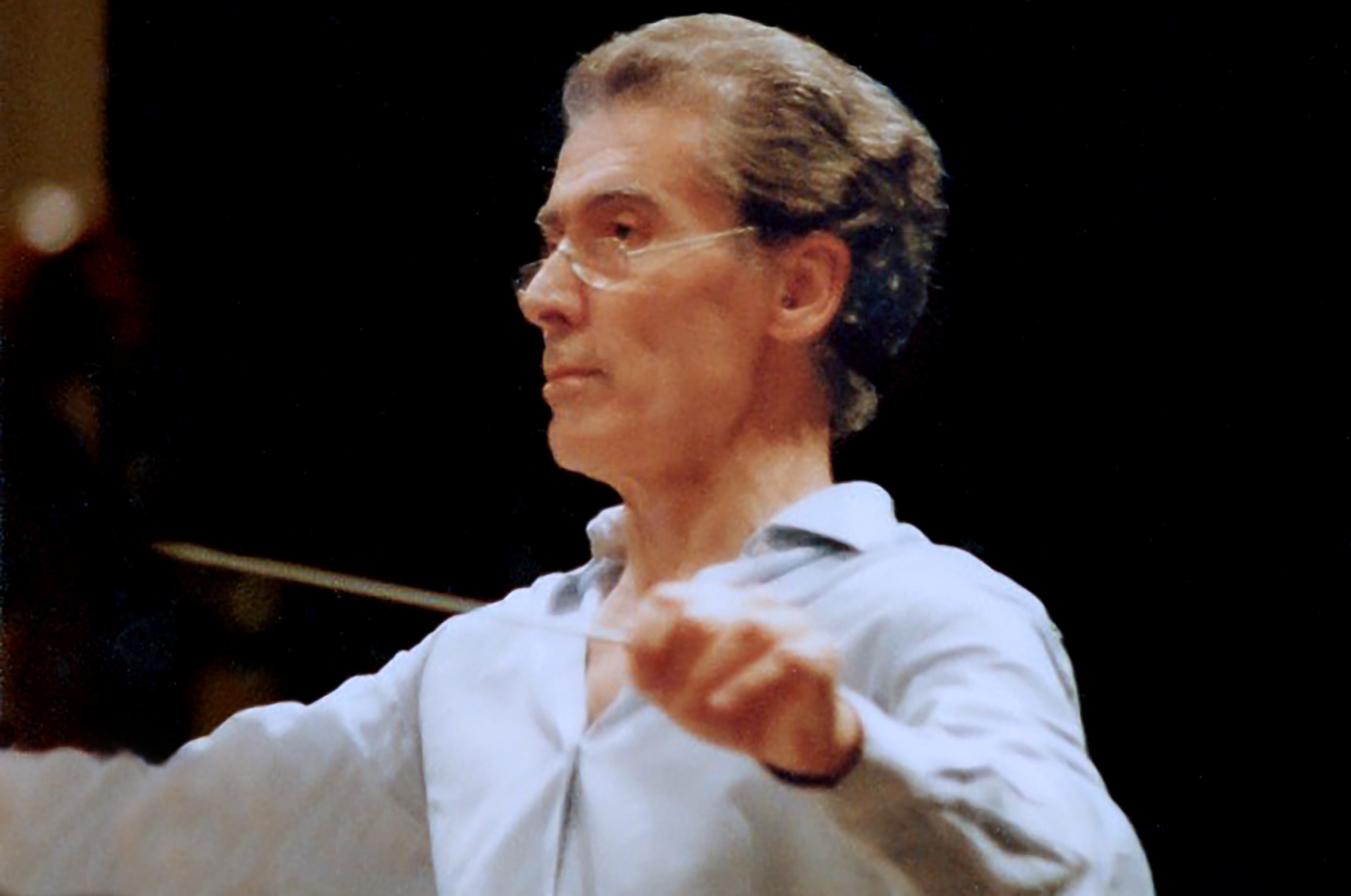
Conductor Jean Périsson in rehearsal at the Saint Roch Church in Paris conducts Beethoven's Oratorio: Christ on the Mount of Olives

Jean Périsson (6 July 1924 in Arcachon – 18 February 2019) was a French conductor.

== Career ==
A pupil of Jean Fournet, he won the first prize at the Besançon conducting competition in 1952. He was assistant to Igor Markevitch at the Salzburg Mozarteum, and was chief conductor of the Strasbourg Radio Orchestra from 1955-56. He was music director for the city of Nice from 1956-65, giving Wagner cycles (with artists from Bayreuth). He was a permanent conductor at the Paris Opera from 1965-69 and led an early French production of Káťa Kabanová at the Salle Favart. He conducted in San Francisco, Ankara and Beijing.

The 1952 winner of International Besançon Competition for Young Conductors, he was invited by the People’s Republic of China to hold a one-month position with China National Symphony (formerly Central Philharmonic Society) in May 1980. He later conducted and recorded Bizet’s Carmen with Central Opera Theatre of China in 1982.

== Publications ==
- Une Vie de héraut : Un chef d'orchestre dans le siècle, Paris, Éditions L'Harmattan , July 2014, 318 p. ISBN 978-2-343-03673-1 Mémoires.
- Jacques Offenbach - Les Contes d'Hoffmann. Commentaire littéraire et musical. Ed. L'Avant-scène Opéra N°25 (January/February 1980)

== Sources ==
- Pâris, Alain (1989). Dictionnaire des interprètes et de l'interprétation musicale au XXe. Bouquins (in French). Paris: Éditions Robert Laffont. pp. 1112. ISBN 978-2-2210-6660-7. OCLC 319830089.
- José Beckmans: Prisonnier de son art - mémoires - (1989). Ed. Librairie Séguier
- Jacques Lonchampt: Regards sur l'opéra de Verdi à Georges Aperghis Ed. L'Harmattan 2003
