= Opera Philadelphia =

American opera company

Coordinates: 39.94804°N 75.16589°W

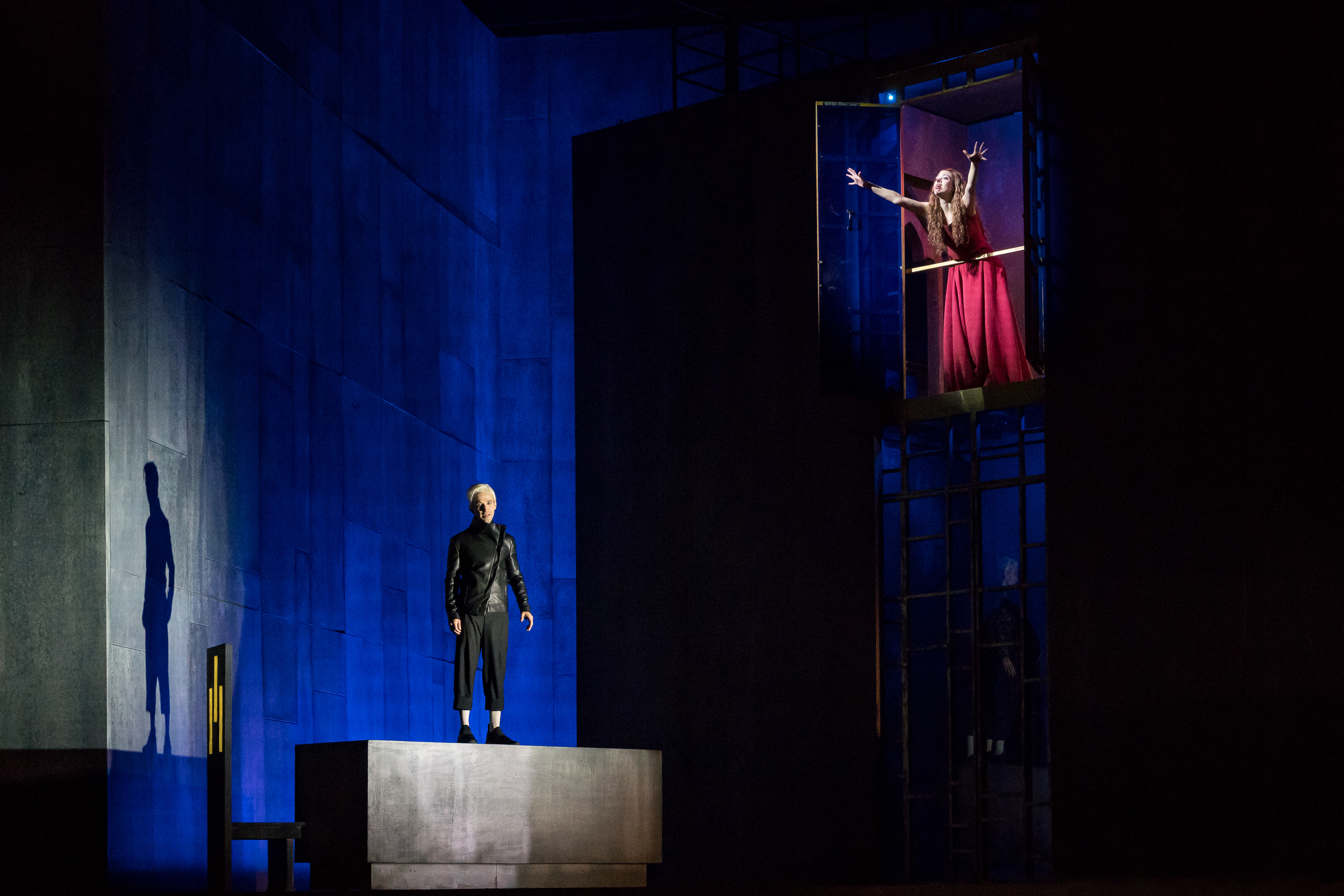
A scene from Opera Philadelphia's 2018 production of George Benjamin's Written on Skin

Opera Philadelphia is an American opera company based in Philadelphia, Pennsylvania. Formerly known as the Opera Company of Philadelphia, the company is the only artistic company in Philadelphia that produces grand opera. The company produces one festival in September (Festival O) and additional operas in the spring season, encompassing works from the 17th through the 21st century. The company stages productions at Academy of Music in Philadelphia.

== History ==
The Opera Company of Philadelphia (OCP) was established in 1975 with the merger of the Philadelphia Lyric Opera Company (PLOC) and the Philadelphia Grand Opera Company (PGOC); two organizations which had competed with one another for many years. Adele W. Paxson, who headed the PLOC, was appointed the first president of the company's board, a position she held for many years. Max Leon, conductor and general manager of the PGOC, became the company's first general manager, and Carl Suppa became the company's first artistic director. All three individuals were largely responsible for arranging, planning, and executing the merger.

OCP opened its first season with a production of Charles Gounod's Faust at the Academy of Music on September 26, 1975 with Michele Molese in the title role, Adriana Maliponte as Marguerite, James Morris as Méphistophélès, John Darrenkamp as Valentine, Katherine Ciesinski as Siebel, Fredda Rakusin as Marthe, and Jean Périsson conducting. The production was staged by James De Blasis, used designs by James Singelis, and was funded largely by a grant from the Corbett Foundation. In 1976 the company presented the world premiere of Gian Carlo Menotti's The Hero.

At the end of the 1977–1978 season both Leon and Suppa left the company. As a result, J. Edward Corn was appointed the company's second general manager; subsequently Julius Rudel became an artistic consultant for the company. In 1980, Corn left the company to become the director of the National Endowment for the Arts' new opera and musical theater program. Margaret Anne Everett, the OCP's director of educational and community services since 1977, was initially appointed the company's acting manager and then officially became the company's third general manager. She remained in that position for fourteen years.

In 1982, Jessye Norman made her first appearances in an opera in the United States with OCP; starring as Jocasta in Stravinsky's Oedipus rex, and as Purcell's Dido.

In March 1990, Everett resigned from her post. Jane Grey Nemeth, director of the OCP's Luciano Pavarotti International Voice Competition at the time, became the company's acting general director. In January 1991, the company named Robert B. Driver its general director. The company named its first-ever music director, Corrado Rovaris, in 2005. In March 2009, the company announced the return of Driver to the post of artistic director, and the appointment of David B. Devan, OCP's managing director since January 2006, as the OCP's executive director. Devan was appointed general director in February 2011. Devan announced that he will step down in June 2024.

In 2013, the company renamed itself Opera Philadelphia and adopted a new logo. In August 2023, the company announced the conclusion of Devan's tenure as its general director and president effective 31 May 2024, along with staff and expense reductions in the wake of the COVID-19 pandemic.

In April 2024, the company announced the appointment of Anthony Roth Costanzo as its next general director and president, effective 1 June 2024.. In January 2026, the company announced the extensions of Costanzo's contract as general director and of Rovaris' contract as music director each through 31 May 2029.
