= Mississippi Opera =

The Mississippi Opera is an American opera company located in Jackson, Mississippi founded in 1945. The company presents an annual season of opera consisting of two fully staged opera productions and smaller concerts and workshops open to the public. The company's productions are performed at the Belhaven University Center for the Arts. Composer William Grant Still and soprano Leontyne Price both have associations with the company.
