= Opera Theatre of Rochester =

The Opera Theatre of Rochester was an American opera company located in Rochester, New York. It was active from 1962 until 1999 when it merged with Rochester Broadway Theatre League to form Opera Rochester.

== History ==
The Opera Theatre of Rochester (OTR) was founded in 1962 by Ruth Rosenberg. Paul Freeman served as OTR's first music director from 1962 to 1966. OTR's first production was Pietro Mascagni's Cavalleria rusticana which it presented at East High School, Rochester in November 1962 with a cast led by tenor Eddy Ruhl as Turiddu, soprano Charlene Chadwick Cullen as Santuzza, mezzo-soprano Joyce Castle as Lucia, and baritone Calvin Dash as Alfio. It was presented in a double bill with Alec Wilder's Sunday Excursion.

The OTR did not stage any operas in 1963, but in the 1964-1965 season it presented double bills of Puccini's Gianni Schicchi and Ron Nelson's The Birthday of the Infanta and Gian Carlo Menotti's The Medium and Mozart's Bastien und Bastienne at the Hochstein School of Music & Dance. From this point the company presented an annual season consisting of two or three fully staged operas with the Rochester Philharmonic Orchestra accompanying its performers. Eventually the OTR moved its productions to the Eastman Theatre; typically presenting four performances of each production.

In the summer of 1986, financial problems led the OTR to cancel its productions for the 1986-1987 season. In 1988 Haskell Rosenburg succeeded Ruth Rosenburg as president of OTR's board. At the same time Margie Wood was appointed the OTR's General Manager and Producer. The company resumed performances with a production of Puccini's Madama Butterfly at the Nazareth College Arts Center in March 1989. It was directed by Leonard Treash and starred Maryanne Telese in the title role and Harlan Foss as Pinkerton.

In 1990 Glenn West was appointed executive director of the company. The OTR merged with Rochester Broadway Theatre League to form Opera Rochester (OR) in 1999. OR in turn merged with Rochester Opera Factory, and Opera Theatre Guild to form Mercury Opera Rochester (MOR) in 2005. Conductors Gerard Floriano and Benton Hess served as co-artistic directors of MOR until financial pressures led to its closure in 2011.
