= Diana Soviero =

American operatic soprano (born 1946)

Diana Soviero (born March 19, 1942, in Jersey City) is an American operatic soprano of international stature, a recipient of the Richard Tucker Award in 1979.

Soviero studied at the Juilliard School of Music with Florence Berggren, Marinka Gurewich, Martin Rich, and Boris Goldovsky. She made her debut under the name Diana Catani-Soviero at the Chautauqua Opera in 1969 as Mimi in La Boheme. In the early years of her career she performed widely in smaller American theatres building herself a repertory.

She was a celebrity guest on a week of Match Game in 1980.

She made her debut at the New York City Opera in 1973, the Lyric Opera of Chicago in 1979, the San Francisco Opera in 1982, establishing herself in verismo roles, notably as Nedda, Manon Lescaut, Madama Butterfly.

Beginning in 1981, she appeared at the New York City Opera in Verdi's La Traviata, conducted by Mario Bernardi. and widely in Europe; Zürich, Toulouse, Nice, Hamburg, Munich, Rome, Palermo, etc. In 1987, she made her debuts at both La Scala in Milan, and the Metropolitan Opera in New York. She made her debut at the Paris Opéra in 1988, and Royal Opera House in London in 1989.

Her repertory includes; Gounod's Marguerite and Juliette, La traviata, Boito's Margherita, Puccini's Il trittico and Tosca, Giordano's Maddalena and Fedora, Cilea's Adriana Lecouvreur, etc.

Soviero is married to Bernard Uzan, renowned operatic stage director, who was the director of the Florida Grand Opera Young Artist Program from 1996 to 2001, and former general and artistic director of l'Opéra de Montréal, where she often appeared in the 1990s. She makes her home between New York City, Miami Beach, and France. She was a faculty member at Mannes School of Music.

Soviero and her husband Bernard Uzan were appointed co-artistic directors of Florida Grand Opera's Young Artist Program from 2016 until 2018.
