= Academy of Vocal Arts =

Music school in Philadelphia, USA

Coordinates: 39.94793°N 75.17371°W

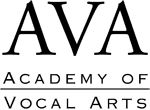
- Type: private opera school
- Established: 1934
- President: Scott Guzielek
- Students: 22
- Location: Philadelphia, Pennsylvania, United States
- Campus: Urban
- Website: Official website

The Academy of Vocal Arts (AVA) is a private opera school in Philadelphia, Pennsylvania, United States. The AVA is a tuition-free institution of training and performance for opera. Located in a 19th-century townhouse at 1920 Spruce Street, it was founded in 1934 as the School for Vocal Scholarships and was re-named AVA in 1936. The AVA is accredited by the National Association of Schools of Music as a non-degree granting institution. While it does not offer degrees, it awards graduate-level artist diplomas to students who have successfully completed a four-year program of study and are ready for a professional career in opera. The school's annual seasons of student opera productions are performed at AVA's Helen Corning Warden Theater and sometimes tour to regional venues such as the Zoellner Arts Center in Bethlehem, Pennsylvania.

== History ==
=== Early history ===
AVA was founded in 1934 by Helen Corning Warden as The School for Vocal Scholarships. Its initial charter was established on January 10, 1936. The charter was subsequently amended on September 22, 1936 to formerly change the school's name to the Academy of Vocal Arts. Tenor Edgar Milton Cooke served as the first dean and head of the vocal department with composer and conductor H. Maurice Jacquet as musical director and vocal coach, and Victor Andoga as production director and instructor of stage technique. Vernon Hammond was the school's first vocal coach, and Warden held the title of the school's president. Her daughter, Adele Paxson, was also on the board of AVA at the time the school was founded when she was 21 years old.

The AVA was initially located at the headquarters of the Philadelphia Arts Alliance. In 1936 it moved to new premises at 1930-1932 Locust St. Scholarships for the year 1936 were awarded by a committee led by Deems Taylor. By 1937 the school was partnering on productions of opera in English with Philadelphia's American Opera Company for performances at the Robin Hood Dell. In 1939 Andoga resigned from his position, and he was succeeded in his role by Hans Wohlmuth of Oscar Hammerstein I's Philadelphia Opera Company. By that time Hammond was working as Jacquet's assistant musical director at AVA as well as vocal coaching.

In the late 1930s the AVA began performing the Garden Opera concert series at Helen Warden's estate, Faraway Farm, in which AVA students presented operas poolside. This tradition continued for decades until Helen's death in 1960.

=== Move to 1920 Spruce Street ===
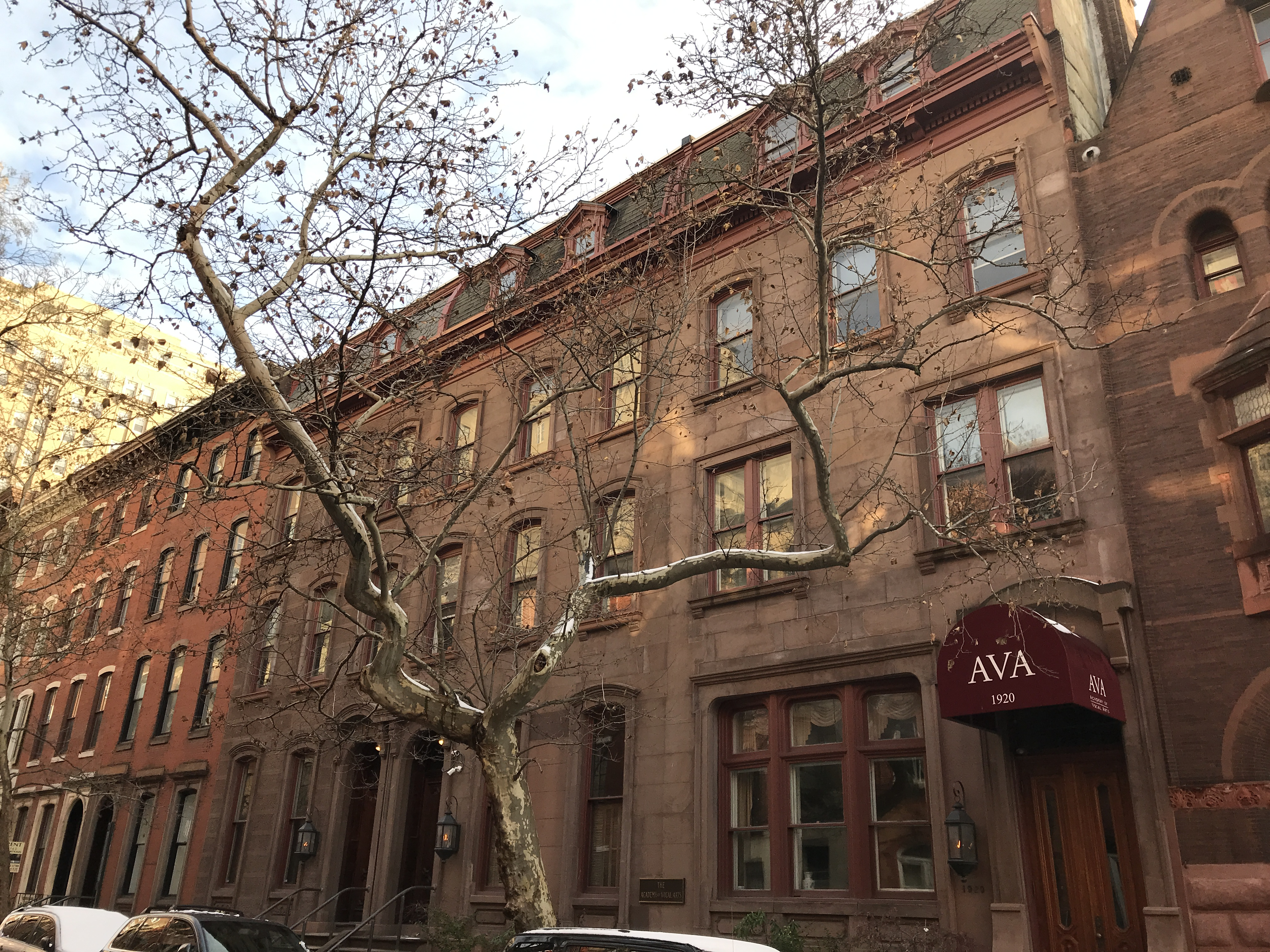
The Academy of Vocal Arts as seen from Spruce Street

AVA moved to its current location at 1920 Spruce Street in the Rittenhouse-Fitler Historic District in 1938. The school is located within a Second Empire style townhouse that was built in 1868. This building was acquired by the school at a heavily discounted price of $10,000.00 from John J. Boyle in July 1938. The school paid less than a third of the building's assessed value. AVA's new home was officially opened with a concert given by AVA's students on December 11, 1938 with Jacquet leading the musical forces.

The Spruce Street building was originally the home of industrialist Edward Randolph Wood before being sold to cotton merchant Joshua Z. Gregg in 1881. Wood's death in 1932 has led to the claim that his ghost inhabits the building. Gregg had the interior of the house's first floor redesigned by architects Frank Furness and George W. Hewitt who had recently designed the Pennsylvania Academy of Fine Arts. Later work on the house was done in 1902 by G. W. & W. D. Hewitt, which included the addition of a music room that today is the Helen Corning Warden Theater. The building is now listed on the Philadelphia Register of Historic Places.

=== Mid-20th century ===
In 1940 Herbert Graf, a stage director with the Metropolitan Opera, joined the faculty of AVA. That same year Hammond was made AVA's executive manager and head of the opera coaching department in addition to serving on the conducting staff. In the fall of 1940 the school performed Paul Hindemith's Hin und zurück at Bryn Mawr College. Benno D. Frank was resident stage director at AVA for three years in the early 1940s. Frank staged the world premiere production of The Masterpiece by composer Paul Nordoff which AVA's students performed at Town Hall (a.k.a Scottish Rite Temple) on January 25, 1941. It was presented in a double bill with Joseph Haydn's The Apothecary.

Cooke remained AVA's dean into the first part of 1941. By November 1941 Cooke was no longer leading the school, and Hammond was serving as AVA's director. In March 1942 Hammond conducted the students of AVA in a performance of Johannes Brahms' Liebeslieder Waltzes at the Academy of Music to end the city's 12-day long Brahms Festival. The following summer the school performed the operas La serva padrona by Pergolesi and Il segreto di Susanna by Wolf-Ferrari at Middlebury College in Vermont. In 1953 the school presented the world premiere of Jean Reynolds Davis's one-act opera The Mirror. In 1959 the school commissioned Norman Dello Joio to compose the opera Blood Moon to celebrate AVA's 25th anniversary, a work which ended up premiering not at AVA but at the San Francisco Opera in 1961.

=== Late 20th century ===
After the death of her mother in 1960, Adele Paxton had a significant role leading AVA's board. She served as chairwoman-of-the-board until her death in 2000 at the age of 87. An accomplished horsewoman who twice won the Eclipse Award for horse racing, she wed her love of both opera and horses by establishing a combined horse show and opera series in which AVA students would perform operas at her estate in Holicong, Pennsylvania. This annual series began in 1964 and was still happening as late as 1995.

In 1961 AVA gave the world premiere of the children's opera The Great Boffo and His Talking Dog by Philadelphia composer Louis Gesensway at the biennial convention of the Music Teachers National Association. In 1963 the school took three one-act operas to Music Circus in New Jersey, giving performances of Cimarosa's Il maestro di cappella, Stravinsky's L'Histoire du soldat, and Raffaello de Banfield's Lord Byron's Love Letter. In 1971 AVA staged the United States premiere of Luciano Chailly's Markheim at the Museum of the Philadelphia Civic Center with Anton Guadagno as conductor.

In 1973 Luciano Pavarotti taught a masterclass at AVA at the invitation of Paxton. Paxton also brought Jon Vickers to AVA to teach masterclasses. In June 1977 Hammond retired from AVA after serving as director for more than 30 years. Dino Yannopoulos became director of AVA at that time. In the spring of 1978 AVA performed its productions of Mozart's The Magic Flute and Bellini's La sonnambula at the Walnut Street Theatre. On December 14, 1979 AVA performed the world premiere of Ezra Laderman's opera Shadows Among Us, a work he had composed years earlier in 1967.

Mezzo-soprano Nell Rankin served as the head of voice department at AVA from 1978 to 1984. On May 9, 1980 AVA presented the United States premiere of Franz Schubert's Fierrabras at the Walnut Street Theatre; a production starring tenor Paul Spencer Adkins in the title role as a guest alumnus performer. In 1981 AVA staged Robert Baksa's Aria Da Capo which had not been performed since its premiere at Lake George Opera twelve years earlier. After this AVA began staging operas in co-productions with the stage plays they had been adapted from, including 1982 productions of Puccini's Madama Butterfly presented concurrently with David Belasco's Madame Butterfly. In 1982-1983 the Helen Corning Warden Theatre underwent a significant renovation and restoration in order to make more room for a 30-piece orchestra to accompany opera productions.

In 1987 Kevin James McDowell succeeded Yannopoulos as director of AVA with Yannopoulos remaining at the school as artistic director with responsibilities for staging operas. By 1991 the Chamber Orchestra of Philadelphia (COP) was playing for the AVA's opera productions at the Helen Corning Warden Theater. Later the school founded its own separate orchestra, the AVA Opera Orchestra (AVAOO). However, the overlap in instrumentalist membership between COP and AVAOO was so similar that The Philadelphia Inquirer music critic David Patrick Stearns asserted the two orchestras were synonymous with one another in a 2007 review of AVA's production of Carl Maria von Weber's Der Freischütz given at the Perelman Theater.

In 1995 the 60th anniversary of the school was celebrated in a special concert at the Academy of Music. Alumni of AVA who performed at this event included sopranos Elizabeth Carter, Maria Russo, Carol Skarimbas, and Ruth Ann Swenson; mezzo-sopranos Conchita de Antuñano and Jane Shaulis; tenor Lando Bartolini; and baritones John Darrenkamp and Vernon Hartman. In 1996 the school staged Richard Wargo's trio of operas known collectively as A Chekhov Trilogy staged by Dorothy Danner. The company's performance of Wargo's The Music Shop from this group was described by music historian Ken Wlaschin as an "acclaimed production". That same year further improvements and restorations were made to AVA's facilities by the architects Leung Hemmler and Camayd through a grant from the William Penn Foundation. This included the restoration of the Furness Lounge and the first-floor entrance hallway among other projects.

=== 21st century ===
In 2000 AVA became accredited by the National Association of Schools of Music as a non-degree granting institution. That same year the school underwent an expansion after purchasing a townhouse and carriage house located next to the school. An additional adjacent townhouse at 1916 Spruce St. was purchased in 2008. It was designed by William Woodburn Potter, and reportedly once hosted a dinner for John F. Kennedy while he was president of the United States. On September 14, 2008, AVA celebrated the 30th anniversary of its music director, Christofer Macatsoris, and the 20th anniversary of its executive director K. James McDowell at a special event at the Rittenhouse Hotel.

In 2010 AVA performed the world premiere of Margaret Garwood's opera The Scarlet Letter at the Merriam Theater. The Grove Dictionary of American Music (2013) states that AVA is a "highly regarded" music school, and Daniel Bergner in his 2016 book Sing for Your Life: A Story of Race, Music, and Family, describes AVA as "one of the country's most prestigious conservatories". In 2019 the school performed the concert BrAVA Philadelphia! at Met Philadelphia in what was believed to be the first opera performances at that historic opera house in more than 80 years. In 2023 Scott Guzielek succeeded McDowell as executive director of AVA, having previously worked for the school as Vice President and General Manager.

As of the 2023-2024 academic year, the AVA grants Artist Diplomas to those who complete the full four-year course requirement, but not degrees. The school only awards diplomas to those that have completed the required coursework, and have been deemed ready for a professional career on the operatic and concert stage. The Artist Diploma is designed to be the equivalent in standards to a Master of Fine Arts in Opera Performance (MFA). The school maintains a relatively small student population, and an approximately 1:1 student to faculty ratio. In the 2023-2024 academic year there were just 22 students enrolled at the school with a full time faculty of 20, and 3 part-time adjunct faculty members.

AVA maintains a Hall of Fame for Great American Opera Singers. It was established in 1985 to celebrate the school's 50th anniversary.

== People associated with AVA ==
=== Directors ===
- Edgar Milton Cooke (1934–1941)
- Vernon Hammond (1941–1977)
- Dino Yannopoulos (1977–1987)
- K. James McDowell (1987–2023)
- Scott Guzielek (2023–present)

=== Faculty ===
A partial list of current and former faculty include:

- Robert Baxter
- Mareen Bixler
- Tito Capobianco
- Nadia Chilkovsky Nahumck
- Désiré Defrère
- Sidney Dietch
- Dorothy DiScala
- Wilbur Evans
- Herbert Graf
- Clytie Hine
- Rose Landver
- Sylvan Levin
- Ghenady Meirson
- Nicola Moscona
- Dodi Protero
- Florence Quivar
- Nell Rankin
- Leopold Sachse
- Robert Sataloff
- Bill Schuman
- Graciela Silvain
- William Stone
- Richard Torigi

=== Alumni ===
A partial list of alumni include:

==== Baritones ====
- Richard J. Clark
- John Darrenkamp
- Steven LaBrie
- Frederick H. Robinson
- Seymour Schwartzman
- Alan Wagner

==== Bass-baritones ====
- Burak Bilgili
- André Courville
- James Morris
- James Pease
- Ben Wager

==== Basses ====
- John Lawler
- Julien Robbins
- Gregory Stapp

==== Mezzo-sopranos ====
- Joyce DiDonato
- Hannah Ludwig
- Chrystal E. Williams
- Beverly Wolff

==== Sopranos ====
- Gwendolyn Bradley
- Marina Costa-Jackson
- Carol Courtman
- Ellie Dehn
- Joyce El-Khoury
- Wilhelmenia Fernandez
- Othalie Graham
- Eglise Gutiérrez
- Janice Harsanyi
- Sydney Mancasola
- Angela Meade
- Erika Miklósa
- Latonia Moore
- Ailyn Pérez
- Ruth Ann Swenson
- Talise Trevigne

==== Tenors ====
- Paul Spencer Adkins
- Lando Bartolini
- Richard Brunner
- Stephen Costello
- Michael Fabiano
- Leonard del Ferro
- Jack Harrold
- Bryan Hymel
- Alasdair Kent
- Gioacchino Livigni
- John Matthew Myers
- David Poleri
- Diego Sylva
- Richard Troxell
- James Valenti
