= Edgar Cooke =

Edgar Cooke may refer to:

- Edgar Milton Cooke (1879–1959), American voice teacher, conductor, and tenor
- Edgar Cooke, a puppet character from the Neighborhood of Make-Believe segments of Mister Rogers' Neighborhood
