= André Courville =

American musician

André Courville (born May 27, 1987) is an American bass-baritone, organist, and choral conductor. Raised in Cecilia, Louisiana, Courville was a child music prodigy who began working professionally as an organist at the age of 12. He was the subject of a 2002 French-language television documentary made by Canadian producer Dominique Valcour. He worked as an organist and choirmaster at a variety of churches in Louisiana in his growing up years, and continued to do so while studying vocal performance at Loyola University New Orleans. He began singing professionally in 2005, but temporarily abandoned his singing career and vocal training in the aftermath of Hurricane Katrina. From 2008 to 2013 he was the organist and choirmaster at St. Francis of Assisi Parish. He resumed his training at the Academy of Vocal Arts in Philadelphia where he graduated in 2017.

Courville has had an active international opera and concert career since 2013 when he resumed performing at the Santa Fe Opera. He has sung with many opera companies in the United States and Europe, including the Houston Grand Opera, the Cincinnati Opera, the Opera di Firenze, the Opéra de Rouen Normandie, and the Zurich Opera among others. Some of his performances have been filmed and/or recorded.

== Early life ==
The son of Ames J. Courville and Patricia Courville, André Courville was born in St. Martin Parish, Louisiana on May 27, 1987. His family is Cajun and French was the language spoken in the Courville family home. He grew up in Cecilia, Louisiana where he attended Cecilia Primary School, Teche Elementary School, Cecilia Junior High School, and Cecilia High School (CHS). He attended the French-immersion program in these schools since the time he was in kindergarten.

A child music prodigy, Courville began studying piano and organ at the age of 8, and at the age of 12 was working as a church organist. He studied the organ with Claudette Stelly, and while in junior high school was organist for churches in Leonville (Saint Leo the Great Church) and Henderson (Our Lady of Mercy Church). At the age of 14 he began taking singing lessons with Patrick Melancon. By 2002 he was also working as the choir director at Our Lady of Mercy Church, and that year was the subject of a French-language television documentary made by Canadian producer Dominique Valcour. He graduated from CHS in 2004 and was his class's valedictorian.

== University education and church musician ==
Courville was the recipient of multiple scholarships which supported his education as a vocal performance major at Loyola University New Orleans (LU). At LU he sang in the Loyal University Chorale and performed comprimario roles in student productions of Lakmé, Roméo et Juliette, and La Périchole. He studied singing at LU with Philip B. Frohnmayer. He stopped studying voice at LU; dropping out due to hardships caused by Hurricane Katrina.

While attending LU, Courville worked as the music director at St. Francis of Assisi Parish during his freshman and sophomore year. In 2008 he was appointed organist and choirmaster at Our Lady of Fatima Catholic Church (OLFCC) in Lafayette, Louisiana. After leaving LU he studied with vocal coach Geraldine Hubbell and attended masterclasses with Martina Arroyo in New York City. He won the district division and placed 2nd in the regional division of the Metropolitan Opera National Council Auditions in 2012 and 2013.

Courville continued to work as organist and choirmaster at OLFCC until August 2013 when he moved to Philadelphia, Pennsylvania to begin studies at the Academy of Vocal Arts (AVA). He performed in several opera productions at AVA; including portraying Archibaldo in L'amore dei tre re (2016), He graduated from AVA in 2017. Courville also attended Louisiana State University (LSU) where he earned a bachelor of arts degree in French.

== Performance career ==
Courville began singing professionally while a student LU. In October 2005 he was the bass soloist in Dave Brubeck's Pange Lingua Variations with the Buffalo Philharmonic Orchestra and Brubeck at the piano. On March 4, 2006 he performed with tenor Plácido Domingo at the gala concert of the New Orleans Opera. In the summer of 2006 he performed with the Opera in the Ozarks at Inspiration Point as Dr. Bartolo in The Barber of Seville, the Marchese d'Obigny in La traviata, and Marco in Gianni Schicchi. He subsequently portrayed Don Alfonso in the Martina Arroyo Foundation's production of Così fan tutte.

In 2009 he was a guest soloist with the Arcadiana Symphony Orchestra. In 2013 he was an apprentice artist at the Santa Fe Opera, and appeared that year with the company as the Marchese d'Obigny. In 2014 he performed in Roberto Devereux with the Opera Orchestra of New York led by Eve Queler at Carnegie Hall with Mariella Devia as Elizabeth I, and sang the role of Count Monterone in Verdi's Rigoletto at the Caramoor Festival. In 2017 he portrayed Don Alvar in Les Indes galantes with Opera Lafayette.

In April 2018 Courville appeared at the Dallas Opera as Masetto in Mozart's Don Giovanni. He performed the role of Pastore in Opera Lafayette's 2018 staging of Alessandro Scarlatti's Erminia. That same year he sang the role of the jailer in a concert version of Tosca with the Philadelphia Orchestra. In 2019 he performed the role of the High Priest in Gaspare Spontini's Fernand Cortez at the Opera di Firenze; a production which was filmed and released on DVD on the Dynamic label.

In 2020 Courville starred as Lord Cecil in a filmed production of Donizetti's Maria Stuarda at the Zurich Opera with Diana Damrau in the tile role. In 2021 he was the bass soloist in Beethoven's Symphony No. 9 with Opéra de Limoges, and performed the role of Yamadori in Madame Butterfly at the Teatro del Maggio Musicale Fiorentino. That same year year he appeared at the Cincinnati Opera as Zuniga in Carmen with J’Nai Bridges in the title role, and performed the role of Pietro in Verdi's Simon Boccanegra at the Rouen Opera House.

In 2022 Courville performed at the Tchaikovsky Concert Hall in Moscow as Clistene in Vivaldi's L'Olimpiade with conductor Federico Maria Sardelli leading the Musica Viva Moscow Chamber Orchestra. That same year he appeared in the title role of Mozart's Don Giovanni at the Berkshire Opera Festival, and sang the part of Colline in La bohème with the Cincinnati Opera. He repeated the role of Colline at the Opera Theatre of St. Louis in 2024. That same year he performed the roles of Titurel in Parsifal and Yamadori at the Houston Grand Opera.
