= Graciela Silvain =

Graciela Silvain, also known by her married name Graciela Cappelli, (August 31, 1914 - March 10, 2006) was an Argentine-born American soprano and voice teacher. Trained as a singer at the school associated with the Teatro Colón in Buenos Aires, Silvain began her career performing at that theatre in 1943. After working there as a leading soprano for three years, she moved to the United States where she continued studies at the Academy of Vocal Arts (AVA) in Philadelphia. She sang leading roles with several American opera companies, including the New York City Opera, Central City Opera, and Connecticut Opera Association. With her husband, baritone Frank Cappelli, she toured widely in operas with the Charles L. Wagner Opera Company from 1949 to 1951.

Silvain's final opera appearances were with the Pacific Opera Company in San Francisco in 1952. After this she devoted her time to teaching voice on the faculty of the AVA, but remained active as recitalist in the Philadelphia region in performances with her husband. With Frank she co-founded the Cappelli-Silvain Opera Singers in 1975.

== Early life and career in Argentina ==
Graciela M. Silvain was born in Argentina on August 31, 1914. She was trained as a singer at the Escuela de Canto y Arte Escénico (English: School of Singing and Performing Arts) at the Teatro Colón (TC) in Buenos Aires. She made her professional opera debut at the TC in 1943, and was a resident principal artist there for three years. Roles she performed at the TC included Adina in Donizetti's L'elisir d'amore, Blonde in Mozart's Die Entführung aus dem Serail, Gilda in Verdi's Rigoletto, Norina in Don Pasquale, and the Queen of the Night in Mozart's The Magic Flute.

In 1944 Silvain sang the title role in Emilio Arrieta's Marina at the Teatro Municipal de Viña del Mar in Valparaíso, Chile. The conductor Fritz Busch attended a performance of Donizetti's Lucia di Lammermoor at the TC in which Silvain portrayed the title role. Impressed, he sought out the soprano and advised her to try for an opera career in New York which led her to leave the TC and move to the United States.

== Opera career in the United States ==
Silvain moved to America and pursued further vocal training at the Academy of Vocal Arts in Philadelphia. In February 1947 she married American operatic baritone Frank Cappelli. She made her American opera debut in March 1947 with the New York City Opera (NYCO) as Gilda in Rigoletto at New York City Center. She appeared with NYCO again the following season as Olympia in The Tales of Hoffmann with The New York Times praising her for her "rich-voiced and accurate coloratura". She also performed in Colorado with the Central City Opera as Rosina in Rossini's The Barber of Seville (1948) and Musetta in Puccini's La bohème (1949).

Graciela reprised the role of Rosina on tour with the Charles L. Wagner Opera Company (CWOC) which included performances at the Trenton War Memorial (1949), the Oklahoma College for Women (1949), Liberty Hall in El Paso, Texas, Louisiana Tech University (1949), the University of Arizona (1949) Ryman Auditorium in Nashville (1949), Mary Washington College (1950), Winthrop University (1950), the Soldiers and Sailors Memorial Coliseum (1950), the Philharmonic Auditorium in Los Angeles (1951), the Seattle Civic Auditorium (1951), and the Pasadena Civic Auditorium (1951) among other venues. In this cast was Emile Renan as Dr. Bartolo, Jon Crain as Count Almaviva, and Graciela's husband, Frank Cappelli, as Figaro.

In 1950 Silvain performed the role of Oscar in Verdi's Un ballo in maschera with the Connecticut Opera Association with Zinka Milanov as Amelia, Marie Powers as Ulrica, and Frederick Jagel as Riccardo. That same year she sang the role of Musetta in on tour with CWOC for performances at Columbia Township Auditorium, McNeese State College, Houston Music Hall, Saenger Theatre in Pensacola, Welsh Auditorium, Hershey Theatre, Klein Memorial Auditorium, and the Academy of Music, Philadelphia. Others in the cast included Davis Cunningham as Rodolfo, Laurel Hurley as Mimi, Richard Torigi as Marcello, and her husband Frank as Schaunard.

In the summer of 1950 Silvain and her husband gave a concert tour of Latin America. In 1952 she was committed to the Pacific Opera Company in San Francisco where her roles included Gilda and Lucia. In the summer of 1952 she starred in a production of Victor Herbert's Sweethearts in Atlantic City with her husband.

== Later life and teaching career ==
After 1952, Silvain devoted her time to teaching voice both privately and on the faculty of the Academy of Vocal Arts. She was also active as a recitalist in the Philadelphia region in performances with her husband. In 1957 she gave a concert with the Philadelphia Grand Opera Company at Longwood Gardens (LG). In 1975 she and her husband co-founded the Cappelli-Silvain Opera Singers which performed operas in concert form or chamber operas at places like Saint Joseph's University, Rose Tree Park, and LG.

Graciela Capelli died on March 10, 2006 in Philadelphia, Pennsylvania.
