= Robert Baxter =

Robert or Bobby Baxter may refer to:

- Robert Baxter (MP), member of parliament for Norwich
- Robert Baxter (critic) (1940–2010), American performing-arts critic
- Robert Baxter (executioner) (1878–1961), English hangman
- Bobby Baxter (footballer, born 1911) (1911–1991), Scottish football player
- Bobby Baxter (footballer, born 1937) (1937–2025), his son, English footballer
- Robert Baxter of Baxter v. Montana
- Mad Dog (Marvel Comics), a fictional character in the Marvel Comics Universe
- Robert Andrew Baxter (1879–1947), Canadian farmer and politician
- Robert Dudley Baxter (1827–1875), English economist and statistician
- Robert Baxter, a character in Time Crisis II
