= Rose Landver =

German-American soprano (1902–1981)

Rose Landver, also known by her married name Rose Landver-Davison, (born Rosl Landwehr, 1902 – November 28, 1981) was a German-born American soprano, stage director and teacher of stage acting to opera singers. In the 1920s and early 1930s she worked as a dramatic soprano under her birth name in Europe. Her opera career ended with the rise of Nazi Germany. She fled her native country in 1933 with her Russian-Jewish husband, the conductor Jascha Horenstein. She spent the next six years living in Paris, and then immigrated to the United States in 1940 where she adopted the anglicized version of her name, Rose Landver.

In the United States Landver taught dramatic acting and directed operas at several American institutions; beginning with an appointment to the faculty of the Academy of Vocal Arts (AVA) in 1943. She left that position when she was appointed resident stage director of the American Opera Company in Philadelphia in 1946. She directed operas with that company until it folded in 1950, after which she resumed teaching. She was head of the opera program at the Philadelphia Musical Academy from 1951 until 1954 when she left to assume an identical role at Hunter College (HC) in New York City. There she met the poet and fellow faculty member Edward Davison who became her second husband. She concurrently taught at a variety of institutions in her later life, including returning to the faculty of the AVA and teaching at the Manhattan School of Music while working at HC. She was also a teacher at a school attached to the Metropolitan Opera, and operated a small opera company in New York City giving opportunities to developing opera singers.

== Early life and career in Europe ==
Rosl Landwehr was born in Karlsruhe, Germany in 1902. A child prodigy, she began performing as a concert pianist at the age of 13. She was trained as a soprano in Germany by Anna von Mildenburg among other teachers; staring lessons at the age of 15. She began her opera career at the age of 19; performing at the Badisches Staatstheater Karlsruhe in the 1922-1923 season. After this she was a resident artist at the Pfalztheater (1923-1924) and Staatstheater Mainz (1924-1927). At the latter theatre she performed in the German premiere of Leoš Janáček's The Cunning Little Vixen in 1927.

In 1924 and 1925 Landwehr performed in The Ring Cycle at the Royal Opera House in London. From 1927 to 1930 she was committed to the Landestheater Karolinenplatz in Darmstadt, and from 1930 to 1932 she was a member of the company at the Opernhaus Düsseldorf. She also worked as a guest artist at the Deutsche Oper Berlin (1931) and Theater Basel (1933). She was mentored as a stage director under Carl Ebert in the 1930s. She married the Russian conductor Jascha Horenstein in 1932. Her career ended with the rise of Nazi Germany in 1933 where she lived for six years. She immigrated with her husband to the United States in 1940; ultimately becoming a citizen.

A dramatic soprano, Landwehr sang in opera productions led by conductors Otto Klemperer, Karl Bohm, and Bruno Walter. Roles she performed during her career included Christine Storch in Intermezzo, Donna Elvira in Don Giovanni, Elisabeth in Tannhäuser, Elsa in Lohengrin, Giulietta in The Tales of Hoffmann, Katharine in Der Widerspänstigen Zähmung, Leonora in Il trovatore, Marie in Die Soldaten, Minnie in La fanciulla del West, Santuzza in Cavalleria rusticana, Senta in Der fliegende Holländer, Sieglinde in Die Walküre, and the title roles in Aida, Carmen, Salome, and Tosca.

== Later life in the United States ==
In the United States Rosl Americanized her name to Rose Landver which she used professionally. In the 1940s she worked with Benno Frank in developing the New York Operatic Workshop. In 1943 she was appointed to the faculty of the Academy of Vocal Arts (AVA) in Philadelphia where she was responsible for staging operas and teaching dramatic acting. Some of the opera productions she directed at AVA during the 1940s included Hansel and Gretel (1943 & 1946), and Il segreto di Susanna (1944).

In 1946 Landver left the AVA when she was appointed the resident stage director for the American Opera Company (AOC) in Philadelphia. Her first production with the company was Mozart's The Abduction of the Seraglio which she staged at the Academy of Music in October 1946 with a young Adelaide Bishop as Blonde, Léopold Simoneau as Belmonte, and James Pease as Osmin. Subsequent productions she directed for AOC included La bohème (1947, with Kathryn Westman as Mimi), Il tabarro (1948, with Brenda Lewis as Giorgetta), The Old Maid and the Thief (1948), The Bartered Bride (1948), Madama Butterfly (1948, with Mina Cravi-Bozza as Cio-Cio San), The Marriage of Figaro (1949, with Beverly Bower as Susanna), La traviata (1949, with Walter Fredericks as Alfredo), and The Barber of Seville (1950).

After the AOC company folded in 1950, Landver joined the staff of the Metropolitan Opera's Kathryn Turney Long School as a teacher of operatic staging. Two of her pupils at this school were Roberta Peters and Martina Arroyo. She served as head of the opera program at the Philadelphia Musical Academy from 1951 to 1954. She left there when she was appointed head of the opera program at Hunter College (HC) in 1954. She also taught in New York City at the Manhattan School of Music. In 1951 her marriage to Horenstein ended in divorce. In 1960 she was married fellow HC faculty member, poet Edward Davison. He died in 1970.

In 1959 Landver rejoined the faculty of the AVA and resumed directing operas at the school. Some of the AVA productions she directed in the 1960s included A Hand of Bridge (1960), The Barber of Seville (1962), Così fan tutte (1963), and Pagliacci (1964). In 1961 she directed the AVA's world premiere production of the children's opera The Great Boffo and His Talking Dog by Philadelphia composer Louis Gesensway at the biennial convention of the Music Teachers National Association.

Landver also founded an opera company, Metropolitan Opera Studio, which put on small scale productions featuring developing opera singers. This group performed Così fan tutte at the White House in 1962 for President John F. Kennedy and First Lady Jacqueline Kennedy. In 1964 she directed Chautauqua Opera's production of The Magic Flute with Rita Shane (then Rita Tritter) as the Queen of the Night.

Landver died on November 28, 1981 in Rockville Centre, New York.
