= Meg Mundy =

American actress (1915–2016)

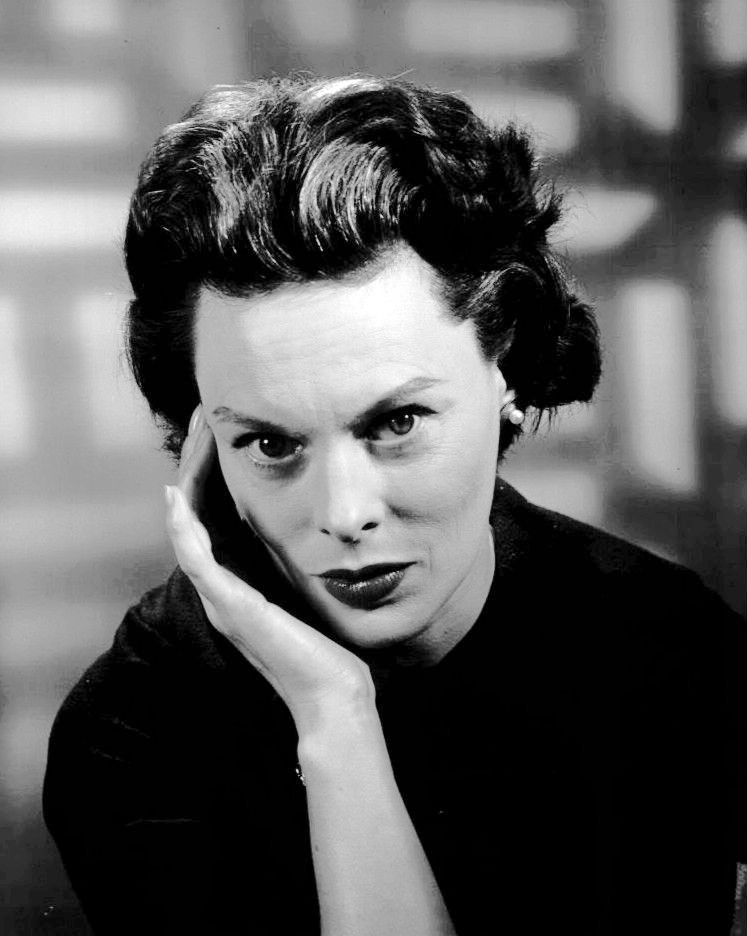
- Mundy in 1955
- Born: Margaret Anne Mary Mundy; January 4, 1915; Marylebone, London, England
- Died: January 12, 2016 (aged 101)
- Occupation: Actress
- Years active: 1934–2001
- Spouse(s): Konstantinos Yannopoulos (September 15, 1951–; divorced); Marc Daniels (1942–51; divorced)
- Children: 1
- Mother: Clytie Hine
- Relatives: John Hine Mundy (brother)

Margaret Anne Mary Mundy (January 4, 1915 – January 12, 2016) was an English-born American actress and model. She was born in London, and in 1921, at the age of six, emigrated to the United States with her family.

== Personal life ==
Mundy was born in Marylebone, London. Her mother, Australian opera singer Clytie Hine, studied at the Elder Conservatorium of Music in Adelaide, South Australia. Her father was English cellist John Mundy. In 1921, the couple emigrated to the United States with their two children. Their father became orchestra manager of the Metropolitan Opera. After retiring as a performer, Hine coached opera singers and musical performers. Meg's younger brother was Columbia University history professor John Hine Mundy. Mundy celebrated her 100th birthday on January 4, 2015, and died on January 12, 2016, at the age of 101.

== Marriages ==
- Marc Daniels (1942–51; divorced)
- Konstantinos "Dino" Yannopoulos (September 15, 1951–?; divorced); 1 child

== Career ==
In 1940, modeling agency founder Harry Conover cited Mundy as one of the 10 top models ("those who lure the highest salaries"). A newspaper article two years later reported that Mundy was "said to be Manhattan's highest paid model."

Mundy debuted as a concert singer at Carnegie Hall in 1942.

In 1948 Mundy starred in The Respectful Prostitute (see below), but Dorothy Parker professed ignorance: "Meg Mundy? What's that, a Welsh holiday?" (Film star Ann Dvorak succeeded Mundy in that role.) Mundy also played Mary McLeod, the lead female role, in the Broadway production of Detective Story.

On television she played, among other roles, an antiques fancier on an episode of Alfred Hitchcock Presents, and wealthy matriarch Mona Aldrich Croft on The Doctors from 1972 to 1973 and 1975–82, leaving 3 months before the show ended. After playing the role of Isabelle Alden on the pilot for the new soap Loving, she briefly played Maeve Stoddard's imperious mother Julia on Guiding Light. She later played the role of Dimitri Marrick's wealthy aunt, Eugenia von Voynavitch on All My Children, and appeared in two episodes of Law & Order in the 1990s.

Her film credits included roles in Eyes of Laura Mars (1978), Oliver's Story (1978), The Bell Jar (1979), and as the mother of Mary Tyler Moore's character in Ordinary People (1980), which won the Academy Award as Best Picture Of The Year. She appeared in the 1983 Walter Matthau-Robin Williams film The Survivors, the 1987 films Fatal Attraction and Someone to Watch Over Me.

== Awards ==
In 1948 Mundy won the Theatre World Award for her performance in The Respectful Prostitute at the Cort Theatre.

In 1982 she was nominated for a Daytime Emmy award for Outstanding Supporting Actress in a Daytime Drama Series at the 9th Daytime Emmy Awards for her role as Mona Croft on The Doctors.

== Filmography ==
Year	Title	Role	Notes
1956	Alfred Hitchcock Presents	Martha Sturgis-Appelby	Season 1 Episode 29: "The Orderly World of Mr. Appelby"
1956	Alfred Hitchcock Presents	Ellen Blanchard	Season 2 Episode 13: "Mr. Blanchard's Secret"
1961	Special for Women: The Glamour Trap	Model	TV movie
1978	Breaking Up	Louise Crawford	TV movie
1978	Eyes of Laura Mars	Doris Spenser	
1978	Oliver's Story	Mrs. Barrett	
1979	The Bell Jar	Bea Ramsey	
1980	Ordinary People	Grandmother	
1983	The Survivors	Mace Lover	
1987	Fatal Attraction	Joan Rogerson	
1987	Someone to Watch Over Me	Antonia	
