= Clytie Hine =

Australian singer (1887–1983)

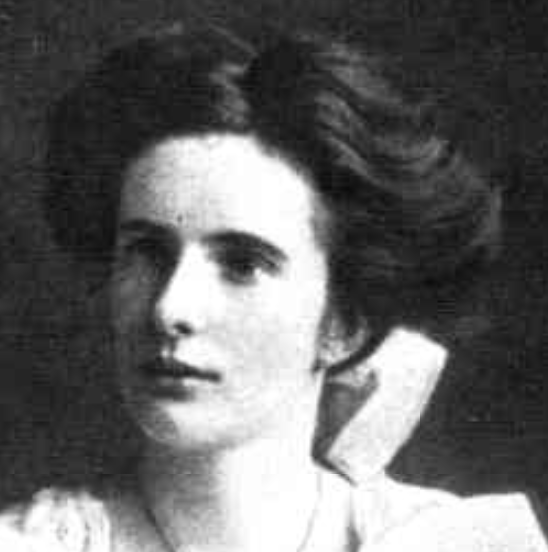
- Born: Clytie May Hine; 8 May 1887; Adelaide, South Australia
- Died: 27 June 1983 (aged 96); New York
- Occupations: Opera singer and voice teacher
- Children: John Hine Mundy; Meg Mundy

Clytie May Hine, (later Mundy) (8 May 1887 – 27 June 1983) was an Australian-born operatic soprano who became a renowned voice teacher in New York.

== Biography ==
Clytie Hine was an only child, born in Adelaide, South Australia in 1887 to William Henry Hine, a jeweller and Mary McDonald. At age 16, having studied piano privately since age 7, she commenced studies with Bryceson Treharne at the Elder Conservatorium, University of Adelaide. Her voice studies were under Frederick Bevan. She graduated AMUA in 1908 and the following year travelled to London to study under Medora Henson at the Royal College of Music. On the strength of her performance in Schumann's Genoveva at the RCM, she made her professional debut as Freia in Wagner's Das Rheingold at Covent Garden in 1911, with the Denhof Opera Company.

She later sang with the Beecham Opera Company in roles such as Nedda, Santuzza, Musetta, Elsa, Desdemona, Sophie, and the Countess in The Marriage of Figaro. In 1915 she was the soprano soloist in Sir Edward Elgar's incidental music for the first production of Algernon Blackwood's The Starlight Express. During the development of the production, she and the other soloists were regular visitors at Elgar's home.

In 1914 she married John Hine Mundy, a free-lance cellist who worked with the London Symphony Orchestra, Albert Hall Orchestra, Beecham Opera Company and elsewhere. They had two children in London: a daughter, Margaret "Meg" Mundy (born 1915), later an actress and singer, and a son, John Hine Mundy (1917–2004), later a renowned medievalist and professor emeritus of History at Columbia University.

In 1921 they left for the United States with their children, settling in New York, and becoming well known for their joint recitals featuring early English music. She also sang in opera in America and beyond while contracted to William Wade Hinshaw, and her husband became principal cellist and orchestra manager for the Metropolitan Opera. He also collaborated with Edward Eager on composing a musical comedy, The Burglar's Opera, which was also staged under other titles, such as The Liar, The Burglar, The Rascal and The Gay Rascal.

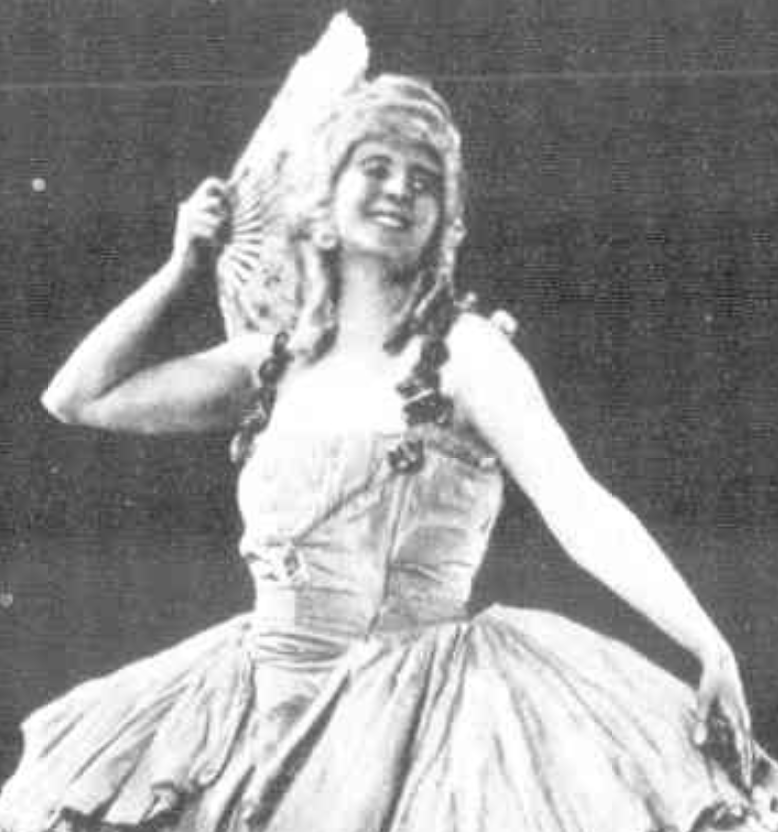
Clytie Hine as the Countess in "Marriage of Figaro", c.1924

Clytie Mundy retired from performing in the late 1920s, and became a renowned singing teacher. She maintained a private class of twenty-five vocal students, a choral class of about twenty, two vocal quartet parties, and a women's trio. Her notable students included Marge Champion (who was sent to her on Richard Rodgers' recommendation), Alfred Drake, Nanette Fabray, Kathleen Ferrier, Celeste Holm, Peter Pears and David Wayne.

Peter Pears had been studying singing under Therese Behr (the wife of pianist Artur Schnabel), but transferred to Mundy in 1940. He had almost daily lessons with her, and his partner Benjamin Britten would often also attend, as accompanist. Pears found her "a wonderful woman to work with, very sympathetic and forthright". She became lifelong friends with Pears and Britten. To help secure an American premiere of Britten's opera Peter Grimes in 1946, she hosted three private performances of excerpts at her apartment for Serge Koussevitzky (who had commissioned the opera), Leonard Bernstein, Ralph Hawkes and others.

Pears returned to her for some more lessons in 1948. Britten dedicated his setting of the song "Down by the Salley Gardens" to Clytie Mundy, and his setting of the Scottish lullaby "O can ye sew cushions?" to her daughter Meg. They also named their pet miniature dachsund "Clytie" after her.

=== Teaching ===
She taught at the Academy of Vocal Arts in Philadelphia, and was musical adviser to the American Theatre Wing. Actors such as Kirk Douglas and John Forsythe studied speech with her. One of her pupils was Metropolitan Opera star Irene Jordan. She retired in the late 1950s; in 1970 the Royal College of Music established an annual scholarship in her name, The Clytie Hine Mundy Recital Prize, which was discontinued after her death.

== Personal life ==
Her husband John Mundy died in 1971. She died on 27 June 1983 in New York, aged 96, survived by her two children and three grandchildren.

== Sources ==
- Hancock, Wayne. Australian Dictionary of Biography: Clytie May Hine; retrieved 27 June 2014
