= John Hine Mundy =

British-American medievalist

John Hine Mundy (December 29, 1917 – April 13, 2004) was a British-American medievalist. He was a professor of history emeritus at Columbia University, where he taught for more than forty years.

== Biography ==
Mundy was born on December 29, 1917, in London. His father, John Mundy, was a cellist, and his mother was the Australian-born opera singer Clytie Hine, who was a principal of the Beecham Opera Company. His sister, Meg Mundy, later became an actress. In 1921, his family emigrated to the United States, settling in New York City, where his father played cello for the Vertchamps Quartet and the CBS Radio Orchestra, eventually becoming orchestra manager of the Metropolitan Opera.

Mundy was educated at the Saint Thomas Choir School, where he was trained a chorister and boy soprano, and the Trinity School. Mundy graduated from Columbia University in 1940 with a bachelor's degree and in 1941 with a master's degree, where his master's thesis examined the Albigensian Crusade.

In 1943, he was drafted into the United States Army and served with the Army Signal Corps in Europe. He was discharged in 1945 and returned to Columbia, earning his doctorate in 1950 and published his dissertation as Liberty and Political Power in Toulouse, 1050–1230. He continued his research interest in the city of Toulouse, writing about the city's society, government during the Middle Ages. He became an assistant professor at Columbia in 1950, an associate professor in 1956, and full professor in 1962, before chairing the history department between 1967 and 1970. Mundy also held positions at the School for Advanced Studies in the Social Sciences.

Mundy was the author of the textbook Europe in the High Middle Ages, 1150–1230 that was known for its reliance on primary sources. He was also a recognized authority on medieval life. He was a two-time recipient of the Guggenheim Fellowship in 1963 and 1977 and was elected a fellow of the American Academy of Arts and Sciences in 1981. He was elected a fellow of the Medieval Academy of America and became its president in 1981.

Mundy died on April 13, 2004, at his home.
