= James Valenti =

American opera singer

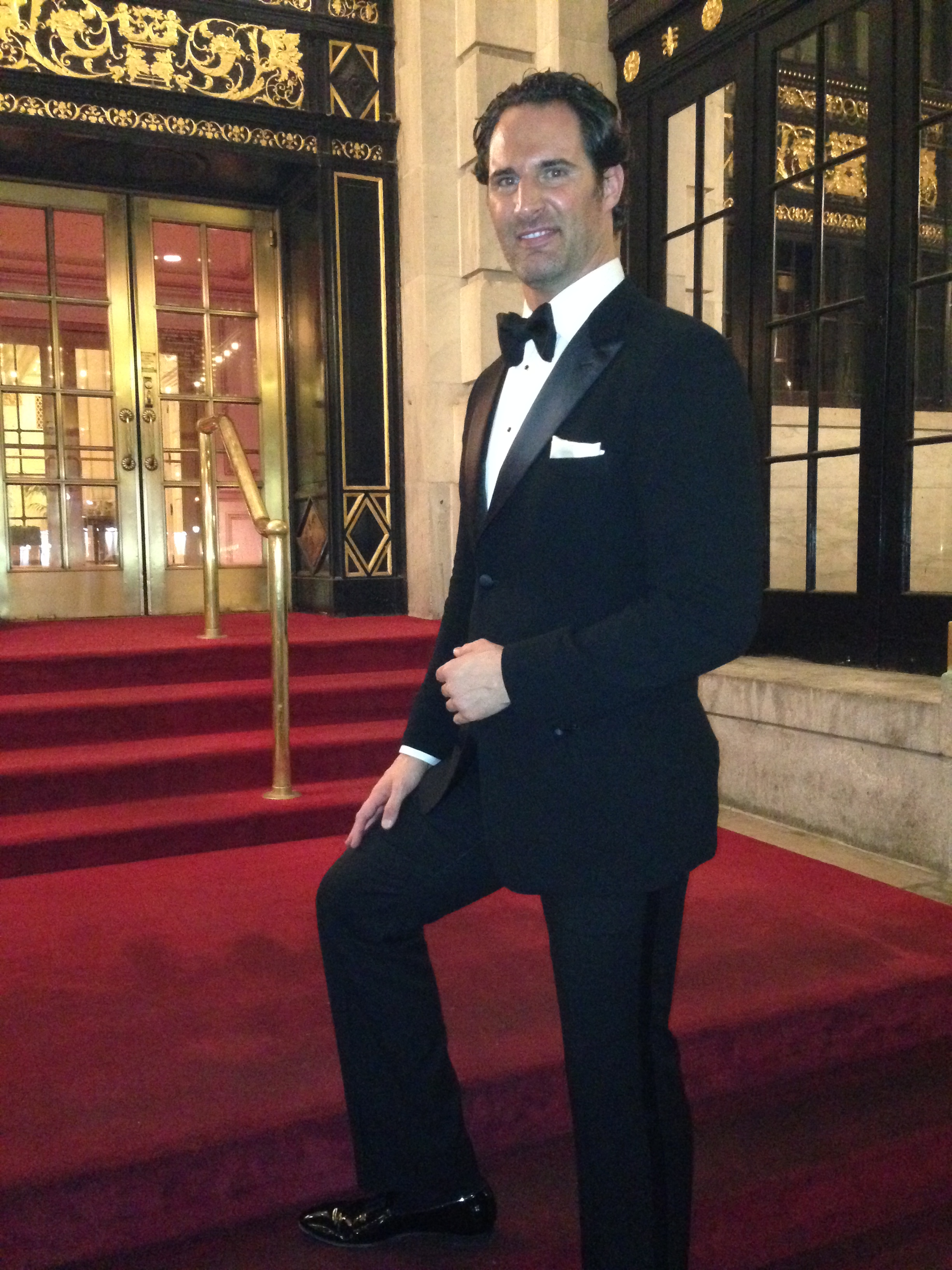
Valenti in front of the Plaza Hotel in New York City on April 13, 2014

James Valenti (born September 2, 1977) is an American operatic tenor with an active international career specializing in leading roles in the Italian and French repertoire. Born and raised in New Jersey, in the United States, he attended St. Helena School and North Hunterdon High School before becoming a graduate of West Virginia University and the Academy of Vocal Arts in Philadelphia, Pennsylvania. Valenti also holds a Master of Voice Pedagogy degree from Westminster Choir College of Rider University in Lawrenceville, New Jersey. Valenti made his professional debut in 2003 as Rodolfo in La bohème at the Rome Opera, and was the 2010 winner of the Richard Tucker Award.

== Life and career ==
Born in Summit, New Jersey, he was raised in Clinton. He developed an interest in performing as a student at North Hunterdon High School. Valenti is a graduate of West Virginia University and the Academy of Vocal Arts in Philadelphia. In the course of his studies he received grants from the Singer's Development Foundation, the Sullivan Foundation, and the Sergio Franchi Music Foundation.

He made his professional debut at age 25 as Rodolfo in the Franco Zeffirelli production La bohème at the Rome Opera. He went on to perform in many of the world's major opera houses, including La Scala, Metropolitan Opera, Royal Opera House, Paris Opera, Sydney Opera House, Opernhaus Zürich and Teatro Colón. He made his Metropolitan Opera debut in March 2010 as Alfredo in Verdi's La traviata in a cast that included Angela Gheorghiu and Thomas Hampson, and at the Royal Opera House Covent Garden in the same role in June 2010. His roles include Cavaradossi in Tosca, Don José in Carmen, Don Carlo in Don Carlo, the Duke of Mantua in Rigoletto, Lt. Pinkerton in Madama Butterfly, Maurizio in Adriana Lecouvreur, Edgardo in Lucia di Lammermoor, Werther in Werther and Doctor Faust in Faust.

Valenti is an ambassador for Children International and resides in West Palm Beach, Florida.

New York City Opera Renaissance mounted Puccini’s “Tosca” in January 2015, at the Rose Theater at Jazz at Lincoln Center, in the Time Warner Center at Columbus Circle, with Valenti performing.

== Awards ==
- 2002 The Licia Albanese-Puccini Foundation – 1st place award
- 2002 Metropolitan Opera National Council Auditions – winner
- 2002, 2003 Opera Index Vocal Competition – winner
- 2003 Loren Zachary Competition – 1st-place winner
- 2003 Enrico Caruso Competition – 1st-place winner
- 2003 Mario Lanza Opera Competition – 1st-place winner
- 2008 New York City Opera – Outstanding Debut Artist
- 2009 Dallas Opera – Maria Callas Debut Artist Award
- 2010 Richard Tucker Award
- 2014 West Virginia University College of Creative Arts Distinguished Alumnus Award
- 2015 West Virginia University Induction into Academy of Distinguished Alumni

== Opera roles ==
- Mario Cavaradossi in Giacomo Puccini's Tosca – Lyric Opera Kansas City (2015)
- Don José in Bizet's Carmen – Hamburg Staatsoper (2014)
- Rudolph Valentino in Argento's The Dream of Valentino – Minnesota Opera (2014)
- Maurizio in Cilea's Adriana Lecouvreur – Washington Concert Opera (2010)
- Nemorino in Donizetti's L'elisir d'amore – Hamburg State Opera (2008)
- Edgardo in Donizetti's Lucia di Lammermoor – Sydney Opera House (2012), Florida Grand Opera (2005)
- Faust in Gounod's Faust – Royal Opera House (2011), Opera Carolina (2008), Teatro Verdi (2005)
- Roméo in Gounod's Roméo et Juliette – Minnesota Opera (2008),
- Werther in Massenet's Werther – Minnesota Opera (2012), Opera Lyon in Bunkamura Concert Hall, Tokyo (2009), Opéra Bastille (2010)
- Viscardo in Mercadante's Il giuramento – Washington Concert Opera (2009)
- Rodolfo in Puccini's La bohème – The Minnesota Opera (2010), Palacio de Festivales de Cantabria (2010), Dallas Opera (2009), La Scala (2009), Aubade Hall (2008), Florida Grand Opera (2008), Semperoper (2007), New York City Opera (2006), Teatro Verdi ( 2006)
- Lt. Pinkerton in Puccini's Madama Butterfly – Teatro Colón (2014), Metropolitan Opera (2014), Opernhaus Zürich (2013), Lyric Opera of Chicago (2013), Opéra Bastille (2011), Vancouver Opera (2010), Michigan Opera Theatre (2008), New York City Opera (2008), San Francisco Opera (2007), Opéra de Marseille (2007), Semperoper (2007), Palm Beach Opera (2007), Teatro Carlo Felice (2006)
- Don Carlo in Verdi's Don Carlo – Caramoor Festival (2013), Austin Lyric Opera (2013)
- Alfredo in Verdi's La traviata – Bavarian State Opera (2012), Dallas Opera (2012), Royal Opera House (2011, 2010), Metropolitan Opera (2010), Deutsche Oper Berlin (2009), Korean Opera (2007), Teatro Pérez Galdós de Las Palmas (2007), Canadian Opera Company (2007), La Monnaie (2006), Hamburg State Opera (2006), Teatro Comunale di Bologna (2005)
- Duke of Mantua in Verdi's Rigoletto – Teatro del Maggio Musicale Fiorentino (2009), Palm Beach Opera (2008), Opera Carolina (2007), Academy of Vocal Arts (2006)
