= Jascha Horenstein =

American conductor (1898–1973)

Horenstein in 1956

Jascha Horenstein (Russian: Яша (Яков Абрамович) Горенштейн, romanized: Yasha (Yakov Abramovich) Gorenshteyn; 6 May [O.S. 24 April] 1898 – 2 April 1973) was an American conductor.

== Biography ==
Horenstein was born in Kiev in the Russian Empire (present-day Ukraine), into a wealthy Jewish family. He was the thirteenth of Abram Horenstein's sixteen children and the first child from his third wife, Maria Ettinger. His mother came from an Austrian rabbinical family and his father was of Russian-Jewish descent.

His family moved to Königsberg in 1906 and then to Vienna in 1911 and he studied at the Vienna Academy of Music starting in 1916, with Joseph Marx (music theory) and Franz Schreker (composition).

In 1920, he moved to Berlin and worked as an assistant to Wilhelm Furtwängler. During the 1920s, he conducted the Vienna Symphony Orchestra and the Berlin Philharmonic. He became principal conductor of the Düsseldorf Opera in 1928, and then the company's Generalmusikdirektor in 1929. He had to resign his post in March 1933 after the rise of the Nazi Party. His Düsseldorf tenure was the only permanent musical directorship in his career. Forced as a Jew to flee the Nazis, he fled with his wife, the soprano Rose Landver, to Paris, France where they lived from 1933 to 1939. They moved to the United States in 1940, and eventually became an American citizens. He taught at the New School for Social Research while in New York City. Rose and Jascha divorced in 1951. They had one son.

== Repertoire ==
Horenstein is particularly remembered as a champion of modern music and as a Mahler conductor, although his repertory as shown by his discography was quite wide. In 1929 he conducted the premiere of three movements of Alban Berg's Lyric Suite in an arrangement for string orchestra. In 1950, he conducted the first Paris performance of Berg's Wozzeck.

Horenstein conducted the works of Bruckner and Mahler throughout his career, and he also displayed ongoing interest in Carl Nielsen, whom he knew personally, at a time when these composers were unfashionable. For example, his 1952 Vox recording of Mahler's Symphony No. 9 was the first studio recording, and the second commercial record, of that work. Several years later, he recorded the original version of Bruckner's Symphony No. 9. He made studio recordings of several of Mahler's symphonies at various points in his career, including Symphonies Nos. 1 and 3 with the London Symphony Orchestra. A number of radio archives hold broadcast airchecks of many of the other Mahler symphonies, as well as Das Lied von der Erde. In recent years, several of Horenstein's concert performances have been reissued on the BBC Legends label, including his celebrated 1959 Royal Albert Hall performance of Mahler's Symphony No. 8 and his 1972 performance of Mahler's Das Lied von der Erde at Free Trade Hall, Manchester.

Horenstein also recorded Robert Simpson's Third Symphony and music by Paul Hindemith and Richard Strauss during the last few years of his life. His opera recordings included Nielsen's Saul og David. His final operatic, and British, engagement was his March 1973 performances at the Royal Opera House, Covent Garden of Richard Wagner's Parsifal.

It was during a performance of Nielsen's Fifth Symphony in Minneapolis in 1971 that Horenstein suffered a heart attack and was caught in mid-air by the leader of the orchestra. Though warned by his doctors to reduce his workload, he continued to conduct. At the time of his death, he was planning to conduct Mahler's Fifth, Sixth and Seventh. His wife Rose died in 1981.

== Sources ==
- Loppert, Max (1972). "Horenstein, Jascha". Encyclopedia Judaica: Volume 9: Is-Jer. p. 525.
