= Peter Davison (poet) =

American poet (1928–2004)

- Born: June 27, 1928; New York, New York, U.S.
- Died: December 29, 2004 (aged 76); Boston, Massachusetts, U.S.
- Education: Harvard University; Cambridge University
- Occupations: Poet, essayist, teacher, lecturer, editor, and publisher
- Awards: Massachusetts Book Award

Peter Davison (June 27, 1928, New York, New York – December 29, 2004, Boston, Massachusetts) was an American poet, essayist, teacher, lecturer, editor, and publisher.

== Life ==
Peter Davison was born in New York City to Edward Davison, a Scottish poet, and Nathalie (née Weiner) Davison. He grew up in Boulder, Colorado, where his father taught at the University of Colorado. Davison attended Harvard University, graduating in 1949. Among his classmates at Harvard were John Ashbery, Robert Bly, and Robert Creeley.

After graduating from Harvard, Davison spent a year at Cambridge University on a Fulbright Fellowship. He worked at publishers Harcourt Brace and at Harvard University Press, serving as an assistant to that press's director. In 1966, he joined the Atlantic Monthly Press, remaining there for 29 years, the final 15 as its director. For 30 years, he was also poetry editor for Atlantic Monthly. (Later it merged with Grove Press to become Grove/Atlantic.)

In the 1980s, he joined Houghton Mifflin, where he edited books for his own imprint from 1985 to 1998. From the 1950s forward, he was part of a Boston and New England literary milieu that included Robert Lowell, Robert Frost, Anne Sexton, Sylvia Plath, Richard Wilbur, and Donald Hall.

In 1963, his first collection of poetry, Breaking of the Day, was selected by Dudley Fitts, for the Yale Younger Poets Prize. He went on to publish 11 volumes of poetry. His final poetry collection, Breathing Room (2000), received the Massachusetts Book Award.

Among the authors whom Davison edited were Ward Just, Farley Mowat, William Least Heat-Moon, and Robert Coles.

== Work ==
In his 2004 Boston Globe obituary of Peter Davison, Mark Feeney writes:

Mr. Davison belonged to no poetic school. His verse was neither confessional nor formalist. He wrote a poetry of reflection: highly intelligent, deeply informed by nature, indwelling yet constantly alert to the external world. "The corner of the eye / Is where my visions lie," he wrote in his poem "Peripheral Vision."

In his poetry, as in his person, there was a worldliness to Mr. Davison, a responsiveness to life's depth. He wrote in his 1984 poem "The Vanishing Point":

Each moment wishes us to move farther on

into a sequence we can follow at most

to vanishing point. We can see no farther,

though time seems to pause and wait for us at times

and measure us and move along again.

As his fellow poet W. S. Merwin wrote in 2002: "Peter Davison, for years, has pondered with clear insight the perspectives of affection, attachment, loss, and memory, his language spare and his tone classical and deceptively quiet."

The Poetry Foundation's biographical page includes the following commentary about Davison's poetry:

Like his mentor Robert Frost, Davison employs a natural voice in his poems and speaks of common concerns. Washington Post Book World reviewer Vernon Young explains that Davison writes "a poetry of reminiscence and conservation" on such timeless subjects as youth, aging, and women. "Davison writes in what I suppose might be called the middle register of diction," Young states. "[His poems] are about illumination and endurance and sufferance, and the rhetoric that animates them is far from being merely conventional." Davison, James Finn Cotter notes in America, is "a reporter of life fashioned close to the land and the thoughts that arise from such a life." Jay Parini, writing in the Virginia Quarterly Review, sees in Davison's poems "a civilized wit, and this contributes to the profound sense of balance, of equilibrium." Davison, Parini concludes, "is one of our truest poets, one whose fundamental sanity and intelligence are more than welcome in a time of cultural disarray."

== Bibliography ==
Poetry

- The Breaking of the Day and Other Poems, Yale University Press, 1964.
- The City and the Island, Atheneum, 1966.
- Pretending to Be Asleep, Atheneum, 1970.
- Dark Houses (1870–1898), Halty Ferguson (Cambridge, MA), 1971.
- Walking the Boundaries: Poems, 1957–1974, Atheneum, 1974.
- A Voice in the Mountain, Atheneum, 1977.
- Barn Fever and Other Poems, Atheneum, 1981.
- Praying Wrong: New and Selected Poems, 1957–1984, Atheneum, 1984.
- The Great Ledge, Knopf, 1989.
- Collected Poems, Knopf, 1994.
- The Poems of Peter Davison, 1957–1995, Knopf, 1995.
- Breathing Room: New Poems, Knopf, 2000.

Memoirs

- Half Remembered: A Personal History, Harper, 1973, revised edition, Story Line Press, 1991.
- The Fading Smile: Poets in Boston, 1955–1960, from Robert Frost to Robert Lowell to Sylvia Plath, Knopf, 1994.

Essays

- One of the Dangerous Trades: Essays on the Work and Workings of Poetry, University of Michigan Press, 1991.

Biography

Edited Volumes

- (Editor) L. E. Sissman, Hello, Darkness: The Collected Poems of L. E. Sissman, Atlantic-Little, Brown, 1978.
- (Editor) The World of Farley Mowat: A Selection from His Work, Atlantic-Little, Brown, 1980.
