= Jack Harrold =

American opera singer (1920–1994)

Jack Harrold (June 10, 1920 – July 22, 1994) was an American operatic tenor and voice teacher. Admired for his comedic skills, he specialized in the tenor buffo repertoire. He had a particularly long association with the New York City Opera from the 1940s through the 1980s. He also appeared in several Broadway musicals. Danny Newman of the Lyric Opera of Chicago stated that, "Jack Harrold was one of American musical theater's most beloved and most versatile performers, possessing a clarion tenor voice that practically bounced off the back walls of the biggest theaters."

== Life and career ==
Born in Atlantic City, Harrold was the son of Metropolitan Opera tenor Orville Harrold. During World War II he served in the United States Army. He studied singing at the Juilliard School in New York and privately with Giovanni Martinelli. He also studied at the Academy of Vocal Arts in Philadelphia. He was a pupil of voice teacher Edgar Milton Cooke.

Harrold made his professional opera debut with the New York City Opera (NYCO) in 1945 and continued to sing with the company with some frequency up through 1987. He appeared in more than 100 productions. Some of the roles he performed with the NYCO were Baron Popoff in The Merry Widow, Hauk-Sendorf in The Makropoulos Case, Ko-Ko in The Mikado, the Magician in The Consul, both Prince Orlofsky and the jailor Frosch in Die Fledermaus, Truffaldino in The Love for Three Oranges, and Wazir in Kismet among others. In 1964 he created the role of the Doctor in the world premiere of Lee Hoiby's Natalia Petrovna at the NYCO. His performance of the Grand Inquisitor in Candide at the NYCO was recorded and the album won the 1987 Grammy Award for Best Opera Recording.

Harrold also sang roles as a guest artist with several other American companies, including the Fort Worth Opera, Opera Carolina, Opera Company of Boston, the Philadelphia Lyric Opera Company, and the Tulsa Opera. In 1950 he appeared in several productions at the Chicago Railroad Fair, including performing the roles of Ko-Ko and Baron Popoff. He also sang important roles in WGN Radio broadcasts of The Mikado, Iolanthe, Die Fledermaus, and A Night in Venice. In addition to his opera career, he also performed roles in musicals throughout his career. He made his Broadway debut in the short-lived Mr. Strauss Goes to Boston (1945). He also appeared in the original Broadway productions of A Funny Thing Happened on the Way to the Forum (replaced Zero Mostel as Pseudolus), The Vamp (as Bluestone in the original cast), and The Unsinkable Molly Brown (as Monsignor Ryan in the original cast). His final stage appearance was in January 1994 as Abraham Kaplan in Kurt Weill's Street Scene at the Houston Grand Opera, just seven months before his death from lung cancer in Manhattan at the age of 74.

During the 1960s and 1970s Harrold taught singing and was director of the opera theatre program at the University of Oklahoma in Norman. He also ran a private studio out of New York City on and off since the late 1960s.
