= Oscar Seagle =

American musician

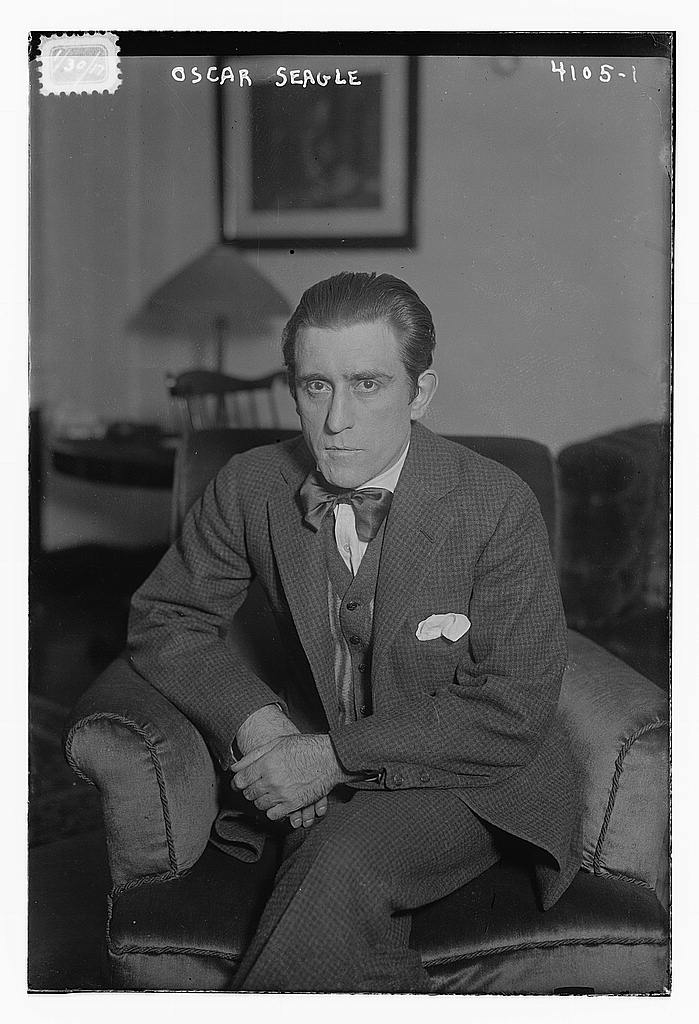

Background information
- Born: October 31, 1877; Ooltewah, Tennessee, United States
- Died: December 19, 1945 (aged 68) Dallas, Texas, United States
- Genres: Spirituals; Pop; Opera; Musical theatre
- Occupations: Singer, music teacher
- Years active: 1900-1945
- Label: Columbia

Oscar Seagle (October 31, 1877 – December 19, 1945) was a prominent musician and music teacher active in the early 20th century. He founded the Seagle Music Colony (since 2021, the Seagle Festival) in Schroon Lake, New York.

== Early life ==
He was born on October 31, 1877, on Ooltewah, Tennessee.

He studied music in Paris, France with Jean De Reszke.

== Musical career ==
Seagle was a renowned baritone during the early 20th century. He toured the United States and Europe, with performances at Carnegie Hall, in Minnesota, Okmulgee, Oklahoma, etc. He recorded songs for Columbia Records. His performances were booked by Winton & Livingston.

In 1915, Seagle founded the Seagle Music Colony. The colony moved to its current location in the Adirondacks when Seagle purchased property there in 1922. Seagle's summer musical school expanded due to demand in 1923. He employed well-known operatic instructors from Europe, including Beatrice LaPalme and Salvatore Isorel.

In 1918, he recorded "Dear Old Pal of Mine". His other hits with the Columbia Stellar Quartette included "There's a Long, Long Trail", "Pack Up Your Troubles in Your Old Kit-Bag", and "The Old Folks at Home". Seagle also recorded the following ballads: "Deep River" in 1917 with Columbia, "I Don't Feel No Ways Tired" in 1917 with Columbia, and "Nobody Knows The Trouble I've Seen" in 1918 with Columbia. He studied music under Jean de Reszke in Paris and sang there for several years. He then returned to the United States in 1921.

He recorded a cover of the song "Calling Me Home to You" in March 1918, which had previously been recorded by John McCormack. Seagle's rendition charted at #4 on the US charts.

Other songs recorded by Seagle for use by educators include: "Smilin' Through", "Can't Yo Heah Me Callin' Caroline", "Come Where My Love Lies Dreaming", "Carry Me Back to Old Virginny", "The Banks of the Daisies. My Love's an Arbutus", "The Meeting of the Waters", "Loch Lomond", "Drink to Me Only With Thine Eyes", and "I'se Gwine Back to Dixie".

Besides teaching music at the Seagle Music Colony, Seagle also taught at the Homer Institute in Kansas City. His students included John Seagle, Saba Doak, James Hardesty Johnson, J. Erwin Mulch, and Capt. Donald W. Johnston, who organized the 102nd Infantry Division Chorus. Voice teacher Edgar Milton Cooke was a student of Seagle's who later also taught at the Seagle Music Colony for many years.

== Personal life ==
Oscar had a son named John, who was one of his prominent students.

== Death and legacy ==
Seagle died on December 19, 1945, in Dallas, Texas.

A theater at the Seagle Music Colony is named after him.
