= Church of the Ascension, Chicago =

- Church of the Ascension, Chicago
- 41.9029°N 87.6325°W
- Location: 1133 North La Salle Drive; Chicago, Illinois; United States
- Denomination: Episcopal
- Churchmanship: Anglo-Catholic

History
- Dedication: Saint Michael

Administration
- Province: Province V
- Diocese: Chicago
- Deanery: Chicago North

Clergy
- Rector: The Rev. Carlos de la Torre

The Church of the Ascension is an Anglo-Catholic parish in the Episcopal Diocese of Chicago. Founded in 1857 as a mission of St. James Church, it is now located on North La Salle Drive on Chicago's Near North Side. The church became a part of the Anglo-Catholic movement in 1869. The principal service on Sunday is the Solemn High Mass celebrated at 11 a.m., according to Rite II in the Episcopal Church's Book of Common Prayer (1979). This Mass is celebrated at the High Altar (facing east), and includes three sacred ministers, many acolytes, incense, and music provided by a professional choir. The mass includes processions and other devotions on certain feasts and holy days.

The church reported 210 members in 2015 and 128 members in 2023; no membership statistics were reported nationally in 2024 parochial reports. Plate and pledge income reported for the congregation in 2024 was $914,483. Average Sunday attendance (ASA) in 2024 was 95 persons, down from a reported 111 in 2016.

== Special liturgies and observances ==
The Church of the Ascension holds many special services throughout the church year, including a Solemn Festival of Lessons and Carols in Advent, a special Mass on the Feast of the Ascension, our Feast of Title (always a Thursday 40 days after Easter), a Solemn procession on Corpus Christi, Solemn High Masses on other Festivals of Our Lord and Our Lady, Requiem Masses on All Souls’ Day, as well as Stations of the Cross on the Fridays in Lent.

== Benediction of the Blessed Sacrament ==
Ascension was the first parish church in the Anglican Communion to offer benediction of the Blessed Sacrament since the Reformation. Benediction is offered monthly after Evensong, from October through May, as well as on Fridays in Lent following Stations of the Cross, and at the end of the Corpus Christi Mass and Procession.

== Current and recent personnel ==
- The Rev. Carlos de la Torre, Rector, 2023-present
- The Rev. Meghan Murphy-Gill, Curate, 2021-2024
- The Rev. Thomas Heard, Interim Rector, 2022-2023
- The Rev. Patrick Raymond, Rector, 2017-2022
- The Rev. David Cobb, Rector, 2014-2015
- The Rev. Gary P. Fertig, Rector, 1995-2012

Current musical leadership:

- Benjamin Rivera, Choirmaster, 2016-present
- David White, Organist, 2016-present
- David Schrader, Organist 1980-2015, Organist Emeritus, 2019-present
- Jeffrey Smith, Interim Organist and Choirmaster, 2015-2016
- Thomas Wikman, Choirmaster, 1984-2015

== Musical practices ==
=== Chanting of the minor propers ===
At all Church of the Ascension Solemn High Masses throughout the year, members of the choir sing five pieces of Gregorian chant called the “minor propers”. In Anglo-Catholic parishes, a “proper” is a bit of Scripture that changes from week to week (or day to day for daily Mass) according to the Roman Gradual (or in Latin: Graduale Romanum), an official liturgical book of the Roman Rite. The most obvious Scripture that is “proper” for any one day of the church calendar is the appropriate text of the Old Testament, the Epistle, and the Gospel; these propers vary in a three-year cycle called the “Lectionary” and might be referred to as the “Major Propers” although that term is rarely used. The minor propers are Scripture that are of lesser importance and according to the Book of Common Prayer are optional in the worship service. Minor propers are Biblical texts that comprise the traditional Introit, Gradual, Alleluia (or in Lent, the Tract), Offertory, and Communion of the Roman Gradual.

A “proper” can be contrasted to the “ordinary” of the Mass, which are elements of the liturgy that do not vary from time to time. The usual or ordinary parts of the Mass include the Kyrie, Gloria, Credo, Sanctus, and Agnus Dei.

Most of the Biblical texts for the minor propers are drawn from the psalms, although some text is drawn from Old Testament Apocrypha, Prophets and, occasionally, the Gospel. The text reflects or comments on and reinforces the major Biblical readings of the day. The major purpose of these musical interludes is to provide musical accompaniment to the non-verbal liturgical aspects of the worship.

The first minor proper, the introit, occurs right after the entrance hymn and accompanies the initial censing of the altar. Since the Middle Ages, this Gregorian chant usually is made up of a single verse in a psalm called the refrain. The chant starts with the refrain and then the “Gloria Patri….” is chanted followed by a repetition of the refrain (or antiphon). Since the Introit is the first thing that happens in the worship service, its first word is sometimes used to designate the entire Mass. For example, the first word of the Introit for the Third Sunday in of Advent is “Gaudete” so this Mass is called “Gaudete Sunday” and the Fourth Sunday in Lent is called “Laetare Sunday,” the first word of the minor propers for this Sunday’s Mass.

The second minor proper is the Gradual, and it is sung between the reading of the Old Testament and the Epistle.

The third minor proper is the Alleluia and is sung in the transition between the Epistle and the Gospel including the Gospel procession into the center of the church. The Alleluia is added as an exclamation of thanksgiving for the word of the Gospel and is sung around a psalm. The Gregorian chant for the alleluia often ends with a very long melody sung to the last vowel of alleluia. During Lent, the Tract replaces the Alleluia since the joyousness of the Alleluia is deemed inappropriate at this time. Tracts are not necessarily sorrowful or penitential, but tend to be longer in length and have no refrain.

The fourth minor proper is the Offertory and is sung when members of the parish bring the gifts of bread and wine to the altar as the priests prepare for the Eucharist. The last minor proper is the Communion and is sung while the celebrant distributes the bread and wine to the other ministers and acolytes.

It is very rare to find all minor propers chanted in Latin using Gregorian chant in every Solemn High Mass as is done at the Church of the Ascension in Chicago. Most parishes use only hymns to accompany the transitions filled at Church of the Ascension by the Ascension Schola Cantorum chanting the minor propers in Latin.

=== Other music ===
Tenor Edgar Milton Cooke was once a member of the church's choir, and in 1901 portrayed Thomas, Earl Tolloller in the church's staging of Gilbert and Sullivan's Iolanthe.

== See also ==
- List of Anglo-Catholic Churches
