= Saba Doak =

American singer

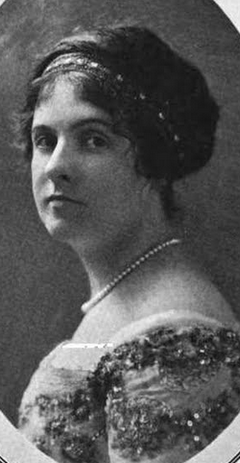
Saba Doak, from a 1915 publication.

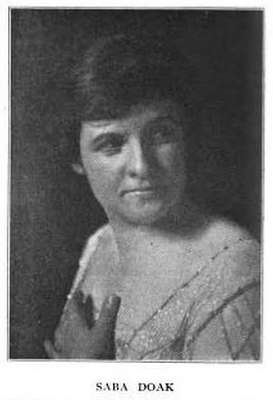
Saba Doak, from a 1917 publication.

Saba Doak (1879 – December 8, 1918) was an American soprano from Chicago, Illinois.

== Early life ==
Saba Regina Doak was born in Texas, and raised in Huntsville, Alabama, the daughter of a Presbyterian minister, Algernon Sidney Doak, and his wife, Emma Regina Smith Doak. Both of her parents were originally from Tennessee. Her father served in the Confederate Navy during the American Civil War. She was a descendant of Samuel Doak. She also lived in Chattanooga, Tennessee as a girl. Saba Doak trained as a singer with Oscar Seagle, Charles W. Clark, and in Paris with Jean de Reszke.

== Career ==
Doak sang in concerts and as a church soloist in Chicago. In 1917 she toured in the American South, and performed with Pablo Casals in Chicago. She announced that she would donate a percentage of her performance income to the Red Cross during World War I. Also during the war, she sang for the troops stationed in Illinois, at Fort Sheridan and at the Great Lakes Training Station. She sang at a reception for the Political Equality League, a suffrage organization in Chicago.

== Personal life ==
Doak died from pneumonia during the 1918 flu pandemic, aged 39 years. Her remains were buried in Huntsville, Alabama.
