= David Schrader =

American musician (born 1952)

- Born: September 15, 1952 (age 73); Chicago, Illinois, U.S.
- Instruments: Harpsichord; organ; fortepiano

David Schrader (born September 15, 1952, in Chicago, Illinois) is an American harpsichordist, organist, and fortepianist. He was a professor at the Chicago College of Performing Arts at Roosevelt University for 35 years, teaching music history, harpsichord & organ performance, and conducting chamber music ensembles. Schrader was the organist at Church of the Ascension, Chicago for 35 years.

== Performances ==
Schrader has appeared with the Chicago Symphony Orchestra on several occasions, at national conventions of the American Guild of Organists, with the Dallas Symphony Orchestra, the San Francisco Symphony Orchestra and the Colorado Symphony Orchestra, the Canadian period instrument orchestra Tafelmusik, and at Ravinia Festival. He can frequently be heard in a live performances on Chicago's classical music radio station WFMT.

== Recordings ==
Schrader has recorded a large number of CDs, among which are the following:

- Biber: Mensa Sonora with Baroque Band, Cedille Records, 2010: CDR 90000 116
- George Frideric Handel: The Sonatas for Violin & Continuo with Rachel Barton Pine (violin) and John Mark Rozendaal (cello) – Cedille Records, 1996: CDR 90000 032
- Trio Settecento: An Italian Sojourn with Rachel Barton Pine (violin) and John Mark Rozendaal (baroque cello) – Cedille Records, 2007: CDR 90000 099
- Trio Settecento: A German Bouquet with Rachel Barton Pine (violin) and John Mark Rozendaal (viola da gamba and baroque cello) – Cedille Records, 2009: CDR 90000 114
- Trio Settecento: A French Soirée with Rachel Barton Pine (violin) and John Mark Rozendaal (viola da gamba) – Cedille Records, 2011: CDR 90000 129
- Trio Settecento: An English Fancy with Rachel Barton Pine (violin) and John Mark Rozendaal (viola da gamba) – Cedille Records, 2012: CDR 90000 135
- Scarlatti on Fortepiano, Sonatas by Domenico Scarlatti (1685–1757), Cedille Records CDR 90000 042
- Introducing David Schrader, Cedille Records CDR 5003
- Soler: Harpsichord Sonatas (vol. 2), Cedille Records CDR 90000 009
- Organ Masterpieces by Franck & Dupré, Cedille Records CDR 90000 015
- Bach: Fantasies & Fugues, Cedille Records CDR 90000 012
- American Works for Organ and Orchestra, David Schrader on organ, Grant Park Symphony Orchestra / Carlos Kalmar, conductor, Cedille Records CDR 90000 063
- Bach: Goldberg Variations, Forces of Virtue Records
- George Friederic Handel: Cantatas, Centaur Records
