= Gioacchino Livigni =

American opera singer

Gioacchino (Jack) Lauro Li Vigni is a tenor opera singer who performs internationally. He was born in Brooklyn, New York and raised in Palermo, Italy. He is an alumnus of the Academy of Vocal Arts in Philadelphia, Pennsylvania.

Livigni won 1st-place winner of The Fritz and Lavinia Jensen Foundation Opera Competition in 2002, and made his Metropolitan Opera debut January 23, 2004 as Krushschov in the opera Boris Godunov. He has also sung with Chicago Opera Theater as Ferrando in Così fan tutte, and was a soloist with Oper Frankfurt in the 2006/2007 season singing Don Ramiro in La Cenerentola.

He is currently on the voice faculty at Manhattan School of Music, the Curtis Institute of Music, and Brooklyn College.
