= Edward Davison (poet) =

Scottish poet and critic

- Born: 1898
- Died: 1970 (aged 71–72)
- Education: St John's College, Cambridge
- Writing career
- Genre: poetry
- Notable work: Be Thou At Peace

Edward Lewis Davison (1898–1970) was a Scottish poet and critic, born in Glasgow, who later moved to the United States.

Davison grew up in Newcastle upon Tyne. In 1914 he joined the navy, where he rose to lieutenant. After the end of World War I he matriculated at St John's College, Cambridge on a scholarship; it was while at Cambridge that he edited an anthology of student poetry and met the writer J. B. Priestley, who would remain a lifelong friend. Davison emigrated to the United States in 1925, and became an academic, teaching at Vassar College, the University of Miami, and the University of Colorado at Boulder, where he was involved in the Colorado Writers 1937 conference. He was a friend of Robert Frost.

The poet Peter Davison is his son. He married soprano and stage director Rose Landver in 1960.

He was widely published as a poet in the 1920s, featured in the J. C. Squire anthologies, and became known as a writer of sonnets. His Be Thou At Peace has been set to music by John Raynor.

== Military career ==
Davison joined the United States Army in 1943, shortly after becoming a Naturalized citizen of the United States. He had previously served as a paymaster in the Royal Navy. During World War II, Davison attained the rank of Lieutenant colonel in the United States Army. He was named director of the Special Projects Division, which was responsible for overseeing the re-education of German prisoners of war. Many of Davidson's poems from this time-frame appear to express doubts about the mission he had been assigned. Davidson had no knowledge of German language, culture, or politics, and so struggled to craft a suitable program.

== Works ==
- Cambridge Poets 1914-1920: an Anthology (1920); BiblioBazaar, 2009, ISBN 978-1-117-36262-5
- Some Modern Poets And Other Critical Essays Richard West, 1928, ISBN 978-0-8274-3459-2
- Collected Poems 1917-1939 Harper & Brothers, 1940
- Poems G. Bell, 1920
- Harvest of Youth Harper & brothers, 1926
- The Ninth Witch (1932).

=== Anthologies ===
- The best poems of 1922-, Thomas Moult, Brace & co., 1923
- Poems by Four Authors (1923) with J. R. Ackerley, A. Y. Campbell, and Frank Kendon

== See also ==
- Der Ruf (newspaper)
