= Lando Bartolini =

Italian opera singer (1937–2024)

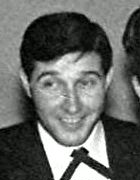
- Bartolini in 1959
- Born: 11 April 1937; Prato, Italy
- Died: 28 June 2024 (aged 87)
- Education: Academy of Vocal Arts
- Occupation: Operatic tenor
- Organizations: New York City Opera

Lando Bartolini (11 April 1937 – 27 June 2024) was an Italian operatic tenor who appeared internationally at major opera houses and festivals. After studies in Philadelphia, he made his debut there in 1968, and received international attention in 1973 in Mascagni's Iris at the Liceu in Barcelona. He was a member of the New York City Opera from 1976 to 1979, and performed at the Arena di Verona between 1983 and 1998. With a spinto voice, he focused on Italian opera from bel canto to verismo, appearing in 49 roles such as Radames in Verdi's Aida and Calaf in Puccini's Turandot.

== Life and career ==
Bartolini was born in Casale di Prato on 11 April 1937. He worked in the family's textile business and later became an apprentice in electronics. His brother was a singer of popular music under the stage name Rocco Montana who participated in the Italian Music Festival, Sanremo. After his brother had died in a car accident in 1967, Lando was inspired to study voice. He won the Mario Lanza competition in 1968, and then began voice studies with Nikos Moschonas at the Academy of Vocal Arts in Philadelphia.

=== Opera ===
Bartolini made his stage debut at the Opera Philadelphia as Luigi in Puccini's Il tabarro in 1968. He then performed in South America, especially in Buenos Aires, Mexico City and Caracas, Venezuela. In 1973 he first appeared at the Liceu in Barcelona, as Osaka in Mascagni's Iris. His first engagement was at the St. Gallen Opera.

Bartolini became a naturalized American and a member of the New York City Opera in 1976, where he appeared as Turiddu in Cavalleria Rusticana, remaining until 1979. He performed as a guest including the Boston Opera House, the Washington Opera and in Puerto Rico. Bartolini returned to Italy in January 1982 and appeared at La Scala di Milano in the title role of Verdi's Ernani. He first performed at the Arena di Verona in 1983 as Radames in Verdi's Aida and Calaf in Puccini's Turandot, and returned annually from 1992 to 1998, including as Turiddu and the title role of Leoncavallo's Pagliacci.

Bartolini appeared at prestigious opera houses in Europe, in 1984 at the Hamburg State Opera, Deutsche Oper Berlin, Cardiff Bay Opera House and the Lyric Opera of Chicago, in 1985 at the Vienna State Opera, the Bavarian State Opera and the Opera Johannesburg, and in 1986 at the Teatro di San Carlo in Naples in the title role of Giordano's Andrea Chénier and as Des Grieux in Puccini's Manon Lescaut in Tokyo. In 1987 he first performed at the Teatro São Carlos in Lisbon as Calaf and at the Paris Opera in the title role of Verdi's Don Carlo. In 1986 he replaced Luciano Pavarotti in a production of Ernani at the Lyric Opera of Chicago. In December 1988 he first appeared at the Metropolitan Opera, Radames, alongside Leona Mitchell in the title role and Fiorenza Cossotto as Amneris, conducted by James Levine. He returned for the title role of Verdi's Il trovatore, conducted by Levine and alongside Mignon Dunn as Azucena and Sherrill Milnes as Luna in 1989, as Cavaradossi in Puccini's Tosca in 1992 and as Calaf in 1996, alongside Gwyneth Jones in the title role and Teresa Stratas as Liu, conducted by Nello Santi. He returned for the title role of Verdi's Il trovatore, conducted by James Levine and alongside Mignon Dunn as Azucena and Sherrill Milnes as Luna. He first performed at the Royal Opera House in London in 1989, as Calaf. and at the Opéra-Comique as Luigi. In 1990 he first performed in Catania, Parma and Torino, in Florence in 1991, in San Francisco in 1992, in Rome in 1994, and in Sydney in 1994. He appeared as Calaf in Beijing in 1999 and in Athens in 2003.

=== Personal life and death ===
Bartolini was married to Deanna Mungai; they had two daughters, Dela Bartolini and Tabitha Bartolini. The family lived in Englewood, New Jersey and near Prato from the 1980s.

Lando Bartolini died at his home in the Pistoia mountains, on 27 June 2024, after a prolonged illness. He was 87.
