= Eglise Gutiérrez =

Cuban-American coloratura soprano

Eglise Gutiérrez (born September 28, 1969) is a Cuban-American coloratura soprano. She studied voice in Cuba, in Miami with Manny Perez, and at the Academy of Vocal Arts in Philadelphia, Pennsylvania, from which she graduated in 2004.

In 2004 she won the Mirjam Helin International Singing Competition. She has also won the Montserrat Caballé International Singing Competition and the Marian Anderson Prize for Emerging Classical Artists. She made her European debut in October 2005 in the title role of Maria di Rohan at Wexford Festival Opera. On 7 September 2009, she made her house debut at London's Royal Opera House in the title role of Linda di Chamounix (recorded by Opera Rara and released in 2010). In 2011, she appeared as Amina in La sonnambula at the Royal Opera House.
