= Dino Yannopoulos =

Greek-American stage director and opera educator

- Birth name: Konstantinos Yannopoulos
- Born: December 15, 1919; Athens, Greece
- Died: April 6, 2003 (aged 83); Philadelphia, Pennsylvania, U.S.
- Genres: Opera
- Occupation(s): Stage director, opera educator
- Spouse(s): Meg Mundy (1951–19??; divorced); 1 child

Konstantinos "Dino" Yannopoulos (December 15, 1919 – April 6, 2003) was the principal stage director of the Metropolitan Opera between 1945 and 1977. One of his major works was a production of Giacomo Puccini's Tosca with Maria Callas on the title role. He founded the Athens Music Festival.

Also active as an educator, he worked as director of the opera program at the Curtis Institute of Music during the 1970s, and was director of the Academy of Vocal Arts (AVA) in Philadelphia from 1977 until 1987. He was artistic director of the AVA from 1987 to 1989. He earned degrees from the University of Vienna, the University of Leipzig, and the Mozarteum.
