= Edgar Milton Cooke =

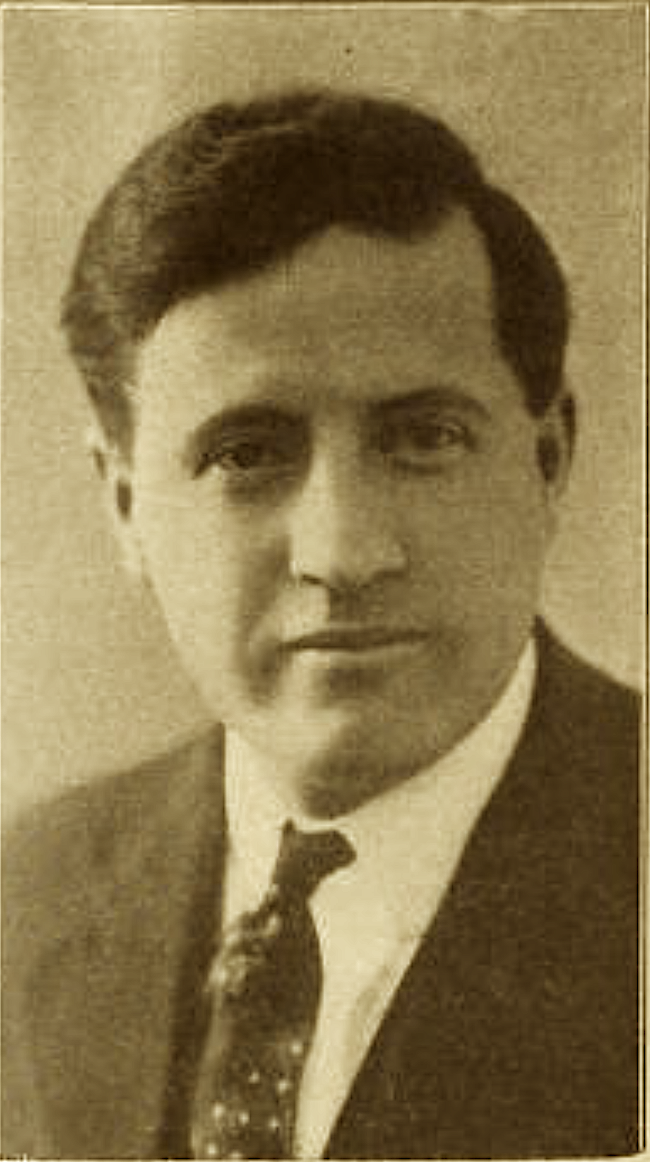
Edgar Milton Cooke

Edgar Milton Cooke (14 October 1879 – 26 February 1959) was an American voice teacher, conductor and tenor. A native of Chicago, he was a church musician and music educator in that city and in Denver, Colorado prior to having an opera career in Europe in the years leading up to World War I. He was principal artist at Theater Aachen at the time the war started, and returned to the United States not long after in 1915 with his German wife Mary.

In 1916 Cooke was appointed head of the voice department at the Musical Arts Institute in Oklahoma City, Oklahoma. He taught there for one year until the conservatory closed. He remained in Oklahoma City as a voice teacher, choral conductor, and church musician until as late as 1923. While living in OKC he was first a student and later a teacher at Oscar Seagle's music colony in Schroon Lake, New York during the summers. He was a teacher of many years with this organization.

In 1924 Cooke opened a private voice studio in Philadelphia, Pennsylvania which he operated until 1934 when he became the founding head of the voice department and dean of the Academy of Vocal Arts (AVA, then known as The School for Vocal Scholarships). He remained in that position until resigning in 1943. After this, he taught singing out of a private studio in New York City until as late as 1952. Several of his students had successful opera careers, including James Pease and Jack Harrold.

By 1954 Cooke was living in San Francisco, California near his son. In the last part of his life he and his wife lived in Stuttgart, Germany. Mary died in Stuttgart in 1957 followed by Edgar in 1959. They are buried together at a cemetery in Aachen, the city where Mary was born.

== Early life ==
Edgar Milton Cooke was born in Chicago, Illinois, on 14 October 1879. He began music studies in his native city when he was five years old, and was a treble vocalist in his growing up years in the Episcopal Church. As a young adult he was a member of the choir at Church of the Ascension, Chicago (CAC), and in 1901 he portrayed Thomas, Earl Tolloller in CAC's staging of Gilbert and Sullivan's Iolanthe. He also worked as a music teacher in Chicago prior to taking a similar job in Denver, Colorado.

== European studies and opera career ==
Cooke pursued music studies in Europe; studying there from c. 1910 to 1915. During this time he also worked as a music teacher in Berlin and Aachen, and was assisted financially by Albert, 8th Prince of Thurn and Taxis who became his patron. He made his professional opera debut at Theater Regensburg in Das Rheingold. In the years leading up to World War I (WWI) he performed in 22 opera productions in Europe in both major and minor parts. This included performances at the Metz Opera, the Essen Opera House, and the opera house in Gdańsk, Poland.

Cooke was under longterm contract as a principal artist at Theater Aachen when WWI erupted which interrupted his opera career. His wife Mary was a native of Aachen. She first came to the United States with Edgar after the outbreak of the war; becoming a naturalized American citizen.

== Teaching in Oklahoma ==
Cooke returned to the United States in 1915 shortly after the onset of World War I. In 1916 he settled in Oklahoma City, Oklahoma (OKC) when he was appointed head of the voice department at the Musical Art Institute (MAI). While teaching there he also served as music director at St. Luke's Methodist Episcopal Church in OKC. In October 1916 he gave a faculty recital at MAI with Charles Haubiel as his accompanist. In March 1917 he was the tenor soloist in an OKC concert of Théodore Dubois's Les Sept paroles du Christ (The Seven Last Words of Christ).

By September 1917, the MAI was no longer in operation, and Cook joined with other former MAI faculty to organize a private music studio known as The New Studios on W. Sixth Street. He taught singing to several singers working on the music staffs of church's in OKC. In September 1919 he was appointed conductor of OKC's Apollo Club chorus; succeeding Edwin V. McIntyre. He conducted multiple Apollo Club concerts at Oklahoma High School with prominent guest singers; among them Metropolitan Opera tenors Paul Althouse (1919) and Riccardo Martin (1922); and sopranos Marie Rappold (1920) Lucy Gates (1920), Florence Macbeth (1922), and Margaret Romaine (1922).

Cooke was also the director of the chorus of OKC's Ladies' Music Club, and was music director of productions of Carmen and Aida in OKC. In the fall of 1922 he opened a studio in OKC with pianist Boris Nazimoff with the hopes that it would grow into a new music conservatory for the city. In the 1922-1923 season he was conductor of the Choral Club in Ada, Oklahoma.

== Seagle Music Colony and teaching in Philadelphia ==
Cooke spent the summers of 1919, 1920, and 1921 studying privately with Oscar Seagle at the Seagle Music Colony (SMC) in Schroon Lake, New York. In the summer of 1922 he was appointed the teaching faculty at SMC. He continued to teach with Seagle for years; and would often bring his students with him to the summer music colony on Schroon Lake. By March 1924 he had left Oklahoma and had opened a private voice studio in Philadelphia, Pennsylvania. By 1934 he was teaching out of the Philadelphia Arts Alliance building at 251 S. 18th St.

Cooke served as the first dean and head of the vocal department of the Academy of Vocal Arts (AVA) in Philadelphia with composer and conductor H. Maurice Jacquet as musical director and vocal coach, and Victor Andoga as production director and instructor of stage technique. The school was founded in 1934 by philanthropist Helen Corning Warden as The School for Vocal Scholarships and offered tuition free training to singers aspiring to professional careers in opera. Cooke remained dean of AVA and served as the founding director of its voice program until 1943 when he resigned from his position. Some of his students at AVA included bass-baritone James Pease and bass John Lawler.

== Later life and career ==
After leaving AVA, Cooke relocated his private studio to New York City where he taught out of premises at 140 West 57th St beginning in October 1943. He was still teaching out of that studio as late as May 1952. Some of his New York students were tenors Jack Harrold (also an AVA student) and Eugene Tobin, and baritone Arlington Rollman. He was living in San Francisco, California when he let his membership lapse from the National Association of Teachers of Singing in 1954. His final address listed on his 1959 death report in the U.S., Reports of Deaths of American Citizens Abroad, 1835-1974 (USRDACA) was the home of his son, Gerhart Cooke, in Berkeley, California.

Cooke died at the U.S. Army Hospital in Stuttgart, Germany on 26 February 1959. He is buried at the Waldfriedhof (Aachen). His wife Mary is also buried at this cemetery. Her 1957 death report in the USRDACA states that she and her husband were living in Stuttgart at an address located at Fritz-Reuter-Straße.
