= St. Francis of Assisi Parish (New Orleans, Louisiana) =

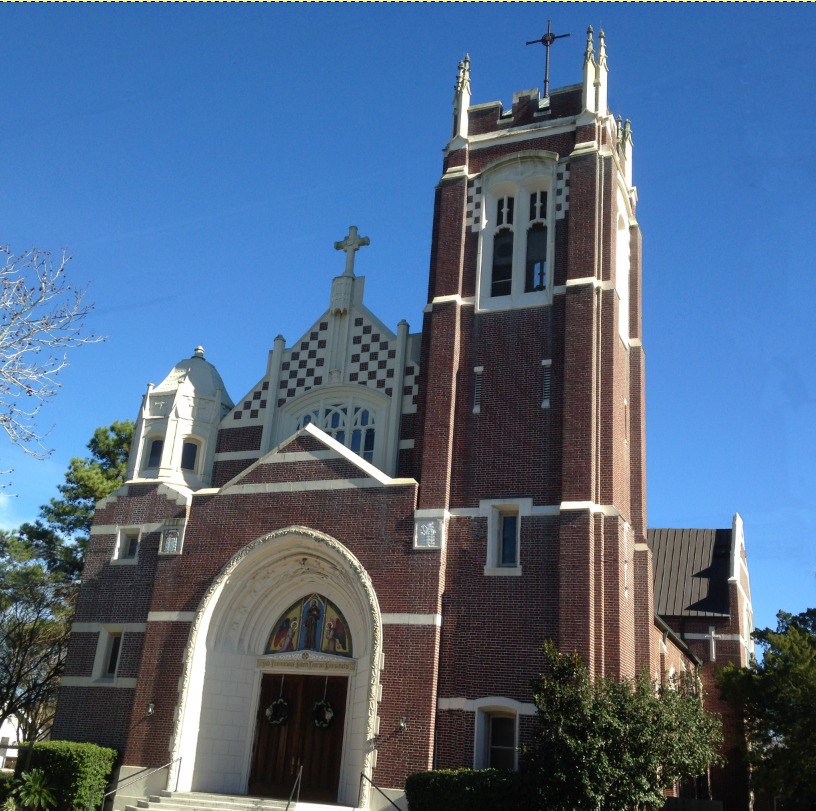
- St. Francis of Assisi Church, New Orleans, Louisiana

- Location within Louisiana Location within the United States
- 29°55′15.12″N 90°7′18.22″W
- Location: New Orleans, Louisiana

Architecture
- Architect(s): General Allison Owen of Diboll & Owen
- Architectural type: Mostly French Gothic
- Completed: 1921

St. Francis of Assisi Parish is a Catholic parish in the Archdiocese of New Orleans, Louisiana, United States. The parish has existed since 1890.

== Parish establishment ==
Having been captured early (1862) in the American Civil War by the Union Army, the reconstruction of New Orleans was marked most notably by the occupation of Union troops until 1878. Six years later, in 1884, the city advertised to the world that its troubles were over by hosting the World's Centennial Cotton Exposition in what is now Audubon Park. The residual effect of the exposition was the attention drawn to the uptown area of the city as a desirable place to reside. The population explosion started immediately following the exposition. Massive immigration to the United States during the period of 1880 thru 1920 due to economics, famine and oppression along with the fact that New Orleans was the second largest port in the United States led to many immigrants from far away locations such as Ireland, Italy and Germany settling in the uptown area.

The churches serving the area at the time the parish was created were Mater Dolorosa on Carrollton Avenue and St. Stephen's on Napoleon Avenue. In the days before automobiles where streets were not paved and many, such as State Street, were still dirt and not covered with either shell or gravel this could mean a two-mile trek either by foot or carriage battling the New Orleans heat or rainstorms with the family in tote. In response to these issues Archbishop Francis Janssens created two new parishes to serve the area. One was St. Francis of Assisi on November 6, 1890 and the other being the Most Holy Name in 1891. Early newspapers state that the parish was named in honor of the patron saint of the archbishop, St. Francis of Assisi, though other theories exist. The parish boundaries being Prytania Street south to the river and from Broadway Street east to Leontine Street. Though additional land was acquired in later years, the Archbishop initially procured lots six through eighteen in the square bounded by Constance, Patton, State and Eleanor Streets for $5,360.

== List of pastors ==
- Adrian Van de Heyde, 1890–1895, b. Holland
- Robert Vaughn Moise, 1895–1899, b. New Orleans, Louisiana
- Francis Charles Brockmeier, 1899–1925, b. Germany
- Frederick William Bosch, 1925–1953, b. Netherlands
- Jules Simon Toups, 1953–1967, b. Lockport, Louisiana
- George Alexander Herbert, 1967–1993, b. New Orleans
- Kenneth J Hedrick, 1993–1996
- Desmond Gabriel Crotty, 1996–2008, b. Ireland
- Phillip Landry, 2008–2013
- Michael Schneller, 2013–2023, b. New Orleans
- Nile Gross, 2023-present, b. New Orleans

== History ==
- November 6, 1890 – The parish of St. Francis of Assisi was created.
  - An existing double located on the uptown and lake side of the corner of State Street and Laurel Street served as the rectory, church, and school until funds could be raised for more permanent structures. The Sanborn fire insurance maps of 1895 show the land on the northwest corner of State Street and Laurel Street to be vacant leading us to believe that at the time the direction "uptown" referred to an area east of State Street.
- November 21, 1890 – Adrian Van de Heyde was appointed as the first pastor.
- November 23, 1890 – The first Mass was celebrated in the parish.
- November 30, 1890 – The first child, William Joseph Finnegan, was baptized in the parish.
- June 7, 1891 – The first wedding was performed in the parish.
- 1891 – At a cost of ninety dollars, a new wing was added onto the house to hold Mass.
- September 7, 1891 – The first day of school was held with thirty-eight students.
- November 8, 1891 – The first wood church on the grounds was dedicated and blessed by Archbishop Janssens, as indicated in his diary.
  - The church was described as "a neat and commodious frame structure, situated in a lovely spot, surrounded by a growth of orange and magnolia trees. ... The church was ornamented with stained glass windows."
  - The 1895 Sanborn fire insurance map shows the church facing State Street just north of the center of the block between Constance Street and Patton Street. The dimensions of the church were forty by one hundred feet. The map also shows a thirty-foot-tall free-standing belfry located behind the church.
- March 8, 1892 – A three-room wood frame building was blessed by Archbishop Janssens to serve as a school. Eventually a three-room wing was added to meet demand.
  - The 1895 Sanborn map shows the school located on Constance street between State Street and Eleonore Street with dimensions of twenty-five by sixty feet.
  - The school was used until brick school was built in 1907. It was reopened in 1912 to accommodate additional students. This building was partially burned in June 1921, and the remnants were demolished in 1922.
- 1897 – The rectory was built.
  - “This fanciful Eastlake camelback was built in 1897 as the rectory for St. Francis of Assisi Roman Catholic Church for its pastor, the Reverend Moise, at a reported cost of $3,000. Like many University section camelbacks, this one confines its ornament to the front of the house, even though it is not on a narrow lot. The central porch bay spandrel, with its curved cutout and gooseneck railing, is unusual.”
  - The 1895 Sanborn fire insurance map shows a rectory was just to the northeast of the church. The dimensions of the rectory were thirty by sixty feet.
  - The rectory was moved to its present location in 1913 to make room for a new church.
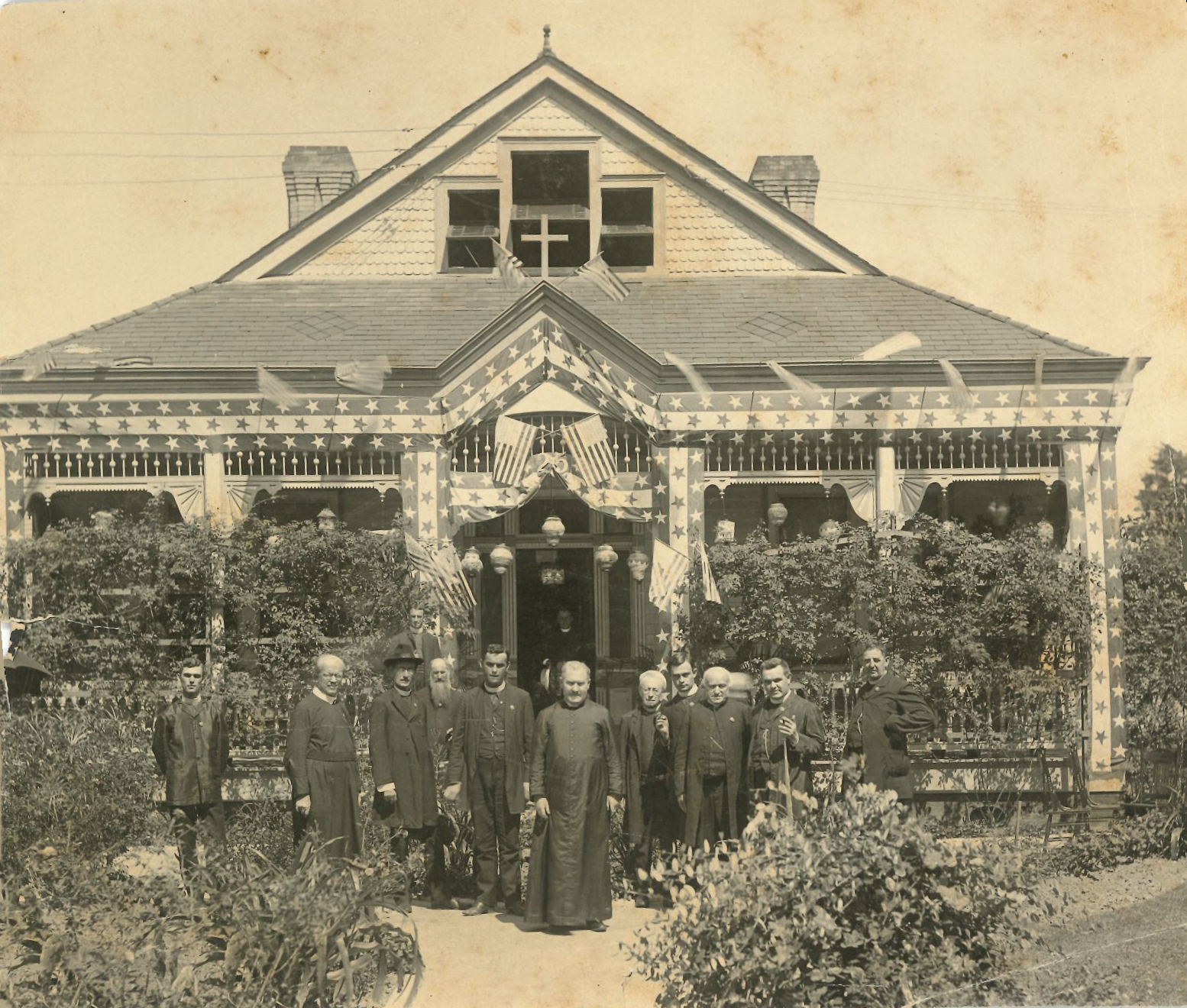
    The celebration of Father Brockmeier's Silver Jubilee taken in front of the rectory, June 1905
- 1896 – The first wood convent was built. Sisters Flavia and Saventia with the Sisters of Christian Charity arrived in New Orleans on September 5, 1891. The sisters would commute from St. Henry's via street car until the convent was constructed in 1896 on the site of what is now the Parish center. The parish purchased the convent in 1939.
- September 1899 – Construction of a new wood church was completed on the site of the original wood church.
  - A newspaper article from December 11, 1901 states that the church is "now receiving a fresh coat of paint within and without and has been recently adorned with a statue of the Immaculate Conception. " ... "The altar is in need of a (new monstrance) and the pastor of sacred vestments. The church has recently been fitted up with electric lights, an expense which Father Brockmeier hopes will be met by some one of the many pious Catholics of the city."
  - This church was moved in 1913 to make room for a brick church.
  - After the 1892 wood school burned and was demolished in 1922, the church was moved again to the site of the school, raised and remodeled. It was used for school off and on until the modern school was built in 1963.
  - "A hurricane in 1947 damaged the Auditorium part of the old wooden building and it had to be removed. A new roof was added and the classrooms in the building continued to be used."
- September 1907 – The second school, which was made of brick, opened its doors.
  - Plans to build the brick school were delayed several times between 1905 and 1907 due to funding issues. The newspapers show there were several festivals on the church grounds to fund the school.
  - The architect was the same one that would design the church in 1913, Diboll & Owen.
  - Construction began on January 3, 1906. The cornerstone was laid on February 10, 1907 by Archbishop Blenk, and construction was completed in time for the doors to open in September 1907 for an enrollment of 317 students. Archbishop Blenk blessed the school on March 29, 1908. Though the building cost twenty thousand dollars, not including fixtures and furniture, all the debt paid off by 1914.
  - The school faced Patton Street near State Street. It had one story with eight large classrooms and basement used for an indoor playground.
  - By 1912 the enrollment outgrew the building, so the 1892 wood frame school was once again used for classes. In the 1930s two more classrooms were added to the brick building.
  - The school was used until it was torn down in 1962 to make room for a new brick school.
- 1921, Construction of the existing brick church was completed.
  - Architect and parishioner General Allison Owen of the firm Diboll & Owen designed the one hundred forty by fifty-six-foot church to be built of brick and reinforced concrete with stone so that it could seat 700. General Owen would be made a Knight of St. Gregory on September 30, 1943 for his conspicuous service to the Church.
  - After moving the 1891 wood church in 1914, the parish broke ground to begin construction. However, with the onset of World War I, Father Brockmeier decided to delay construction. Construction resumed in 1918 and the church was completed in 1921 at a cost of fifty thousand dollars. The stained-glass windows arrived in 1922. The debt would not be paid off until 1942.
  - The church and bells were blessed by Archbishop Shaw on December 18, 1921.
  - As John C. Ferguson, a senior architectural historian with the Historic District Landmarks Commission commented in 1990, "St. Francis reflects the eclectic tendencies of church design in the early part of the 20th century."
  - The book "Splendors of Faith, New Orleans Catholic Churches, 1727–1930" by Charles E. Nolan has a chapter on the church.
- May, 1930 - Though the structure of the church was completed in 1921, the interior decorations were not attended to until 1930. Sheet No. 1 of the plans for Additions and Alterations to the Church of St. Francis of Assissi (sic) is missing, but Sheet No. 2 exists in Tulane's Southeastern Architectural Archives and describes the following:
  - Wood wainscoting
  - Plaster detail of the nave arches
  - Plaster detail of side altars
  - Plaster grapevine ornamental molding
  - New plaster columns with ornamental caps
  - Carved wood hammer beam angels
  - Hammer beam ceiling tracery
  - Base molding detail
  - Jambs and trim detail for present exterior doors
- 1963 – Construction of the Second Convent
  - Construction of the brick convent coincided with the building of a new brick school at a combined cost of $725 thousand.
  - With closing of the school in 1996, the Sisters of Christian Charity who ran the school moved on and the convent was modified to be used as a parish center.
- 1963 – Construction of the Third School
  - Plans for a new school and convent were started in 1959.
  - The school and convent were dedicated on December 15, 1963 by Archbishop Cody.
  - Despite Father Hedricks best efforts and faced with a declining enrollment, he made the decision to close the school for the 1996/97 school year.
