= Rittenhouse Hotel =

Hotel in Philadelphia, Pennsylvania

The Rittenhouse Hotel
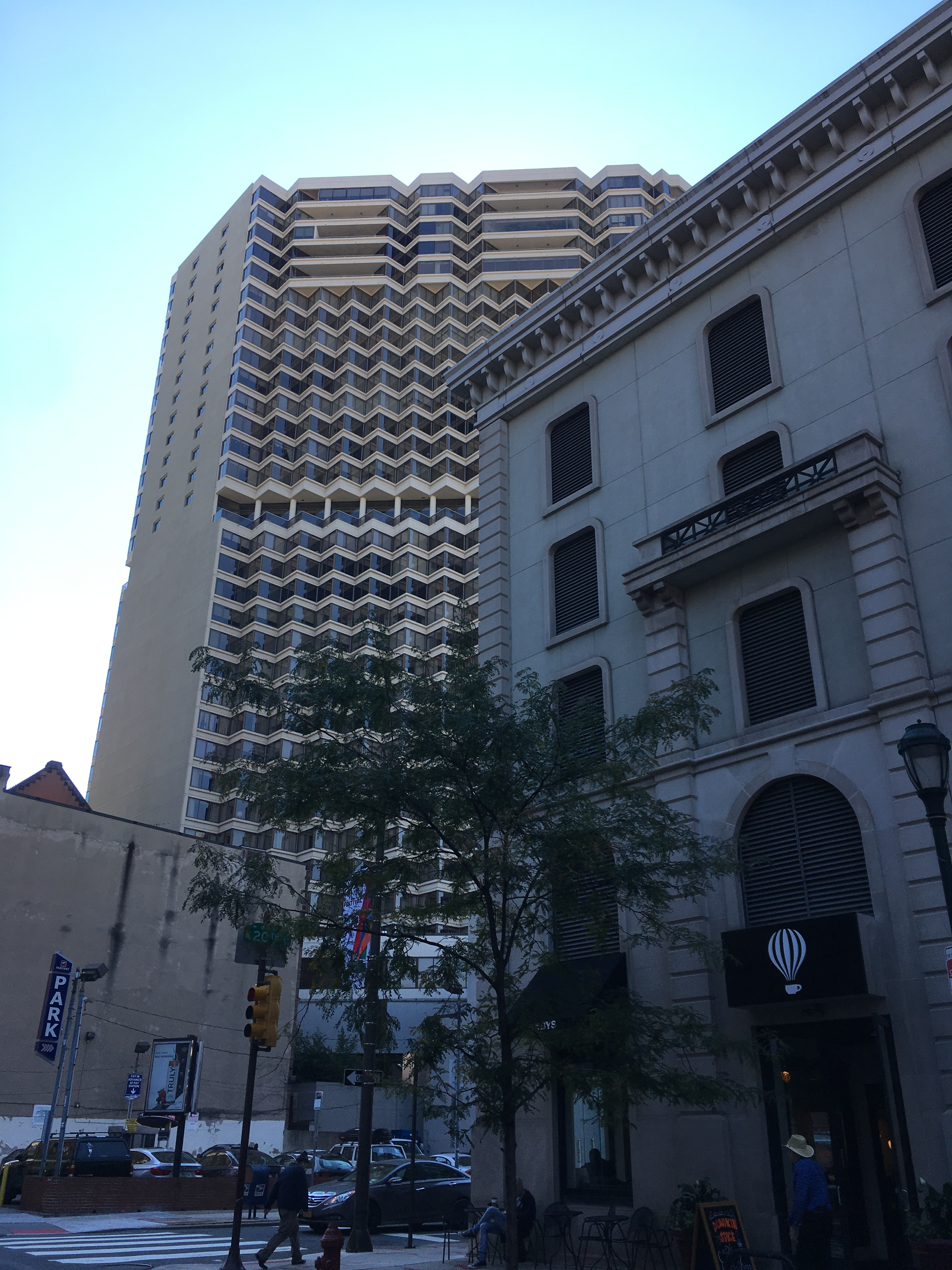
- The building seen from the rear
- Interactive map of the The Rittenhouse Hotel area

General information
- Location: West Rittenhouse Square, 210 Rittenhouse Square; Philadelphia, Pennsylvania 19103
- Coordinates: 39.94993°N 75.17305°W
- Owner: Hersha Hotels and Resorts

Technical details
- Floor count: 5

Design and construction
- Architect: Donald Reiff
- Developer: Greenwood Group

Other information
- Number of rooms: 92
- Number of suites: 24
- Number of restaurants: 4

Website
- Official website

The Rittenhouse Hotel is a luxury hotel in Philadelphia, developed by Greenwood Group and one of 400 Leading Hotels of the World.

== History ==
In 1900, railroad tycoon Alexander Cassatt and his wife, Lois Buchanan Cassatt, constructed the building on its current site. The building was sold to the Episcopal Church of Pennsylvania and was made into their headquarters. It later became a private school, the Academy of Notre Dame. In the 1960s, the property was slated to become a hotel.

Architect Donald Reiff drew the plans for the Rittenhouse Hotel, and construction began in the early 1970s. After more than a decade of construction, the hotel opened its doors to guests in 1989. The design featured views of Rittenhouse Square, angling the windows to offer each room a direct view of the square below. Much of the hotel’s original design is still intact. It has been renovated and modernized since then, most recently in 2019.

== Description ==
The hotel has 118 guest rooms ranging in size from 450 to 600 square feet and 25 suites ranging from 650 to 2,000 square feet.
