= James Pease =

American opera singer

James Pease in a Haensel & Jones promotional ad, 1947

James Pease (9 January 1916, in Indianapolis – 26 April 1967, in New York City) was an American bass-baritone, notable for his Wagnerian roles. He was also a distinguished Balstrode in Benjamin Britten’s Peter Grimes, a role which he was the first to perform in the US in 1946, and later recorded under the composer's direction in 1958.

== Life and career ==
A law graduate of Indiana University in 1939, Pease won a scholarship at the Academy of Vocal Arts (AVA) in Philadelphia and studied there rather than begin practice as a lawyer. At AVA he studied voice with Edgar Milton Cooke. He made his debut with the Philadelphia Opera Company as Mephistopheles in Faust, and sang many other roles with the company both in Philadelphia and in Boston. He also pursued concert, oratorio and radio work on the East Coast of the United States He was praised by Serge Koussevitzky as having "An exceptionally beautiful, powerful, expansive voice".

In 1943 he was selected a winner of the Metropolitan Opera Auditions of the Air, but was immediately called for service as an aviation cadet. He served three years as a pilot in the A.A.F. Training Command, flying some 15,000 miles. He also directed and performed in musical shows at his home base in Texas.

On his discharge in 1945, he appeared at the Montreal Festivals and in a series of operas at the New York City Center Theatre, making his debut there as Sparafucile on 9 May 1946 (continuing to sing at that venue until 1953). Also in that year he sang in Carmen at the Hollywood Bowl in Los Angeles, conducted by Leopold Stokowski. He was also a soloist with the National Symphony Orchestra in Washington, D.C. and at the Berkshire Festival.

In August 1946 Pease took part in the US premiere of Peter Grimes, conducted by Leonard Bernstein at the Berkshire Music Center, Tanglewood: Pease, singing the role of Balstrode, was singled out as giving "[e]asily the most compelling performance on the stage ... [he] carried himself well ... and also sang eloquently". Pease later sang in the US premiere of another Britten opera, Albert Herring, this time as the Vicar, Mr Gedge, in a production staged at Tanglewood on 8 August 1949, conducted by Boris Goldovsky. With the Zurich Opera in 1961 he sang the priest Grigoris in the world premiere of Martinů's The Greek Passion.

Pease sang a wide variety of roles including Leporello and the title role in Don Giovanni, Don Alfonso (Così fan tutte), the Music Master (Strauss: Ariadne auf Naxos), Colline (La bohème), Escamillo (Carmen) and various Gilbert and Sullivan roles including the Pirate King and the Mikado of Japan.

In London's Royal Opera House he sang in various productions conducted by Rafael Kubelík, including as Hans Sachs in Wagner's Die Meistersinger with Geraint Evans and Joan Sutherland in 1957, as King Mark in Tristan und Isolde with Birgit Nilsson in 1958, and in the same year as Balstrode in Peter Grimes, later recording the role under the composer's direction for Decca.

He returned to the New York City Opera in 1959–60, and again in 1967.

Pease died of a heart attack at the Lincoln Square Motor Inn.

== Personal life ==
He married twice, his second marriage after his first wife's death being with English soprano Adele Leigh; after Pease's death, Leigh in 1967 married Kurt Enderl, then Austrian Ambassador to Hungary, in a whirlwind romance.

== Discography ==
James Pease recorded with several companies, notably Decca, RCA Victor, and Nonesuch Records.

- Auber Fra Diavolo: with Wilma Lipp, Ursula Zollenkopf, Rudolf Schock; conductor Wilhelm Schüchter (Relief)
- Beethoven Symphony No. 9 "Ode to Joy": with Frances Yeend, David Lloyd, Eunice Alberts; Boston Symphony Orchestra/Serge Koussevitzky (recorded 1947) (Dante Records Lys)
- Bizet Carmen: with Winifred Heidt, Ramon Vinay, Marina Koshetz; Choir & Orch Of The Hollywood Bowl Symphony/Leopold Stokowski (Eklipse)
- Brahms A German Requiem: with Eleanor Steber; Robert Shaw Chorale, RCA Victor Symphony Orchestra/Robert Shaw
- Brahms A German Requiem: with Carl Bamberger, Teresa Stich-Randall; Hamburg Chorus of the Singakademie; Symphony Orchestra and Chorus of the Norddeutscher Rundfunk/Carl Bamberger (Nonesuch)
- Britten Peter Grimes: with Peter Pears, Claire Watson, Jean Watson; Chorus and Orchestra of the Royal Opera House, Covent Garden/Benjamin Britten (Decca)
- Gilbert & Sullivan Mikado: with Martyn Green, Barbara Troxell; North German Radio Orchestra/Richard Korn
- Handel Samson: with Joan Sutherland, Jon Vickers, Joan Carlyle, Joseph Rouleau; conductor Raymond Leppard; Royal Opera House, Covent Garden, 3 January 1959 (Andromeda)
- Mascagni Cavalleria Rusticana and Leoncavallo Pagliacci: with Hans Hopf, Astrid Varnay, Wilma Lipp, Hanns Braun, Alfred Pfeifle, Hanna Scholl, Hanne Münch; Orchester des Bayerischen Rundfunks/Wolfgang Sawallisch - 1954 (Myto)
- Joan Sutherland and Jon Vickers - includes James Pease as Hans Sachs; The Royal Opera Orchestra/Rafael Kubelík (Pearl)
- Mozart Opera Arias with Barbara Troxell; Hamburg Philharmonia Orchestra; conductor Hans Jergens-Walther (Allegro 1698)
- Music of the Pilgrims - Psalms from the Ainsworth Psalter with excerpts from Governor William Bradford's "Of Plimoth Plantation": with the New England Conservatory Alumni Chorus, Conducted by Lorna Cooke de Varon (Plimoth Plantation)

== Sources ==
- Britten, Benjamin (2004). Donald Mitchell; Philip Reed; Mervyn Cooke (eds.). Letters from a Life: The Selected Letters of Benjamin Britten, Volume III, 1946–1951. London: Faber and Faber. ISBN 057122282X.
