= Robert Baxter (critic) =

American performing arts critic (1940–2010)

Robert Baxter (October 15, 1940 – August 25, 2010) was an American performing-arts critic and academic who wrote theatre, opera, and classical music criticism for the Courier-Post for close to 30 years. The Philadelphia Inquirer stated that his "writing helped advance the South Jersey arts scene", and Opera News wrote that Baxter was "highly discerning and scrupulously honest, and had a well-deserved reputation as a tough but fair critic whose coverage of theater, opera and classical music in Philadelphia and southern New Jersey was highly valued and respected by his readers and by his colleagues."

== Life and career ==
Born and raised in Merced, California, Baxter was educated at Stanford University where he earned both a Bachelor of Arts and a PhD in Classics. After finishing his graduate work, he joined the faculty of Smith College in Northampton, Massachusetts where he taught Classics for roughly a decade.

In 1979 Baxter left his post at Smith College to become performing arts critic for the Courier-Post. He remained in that role until his retirement in 2008. He then joined the faculty at the Academy of Vocal Arts in Philadelphia where he was a teacher of opera history. He remained in that job until his death in 2010 at the age of 69 in Paterson, New Jersey. The cause was pancreatic cancer.
