= Charles Ludwig Wagner =

American theater producer, concert impresario (1869–1956)

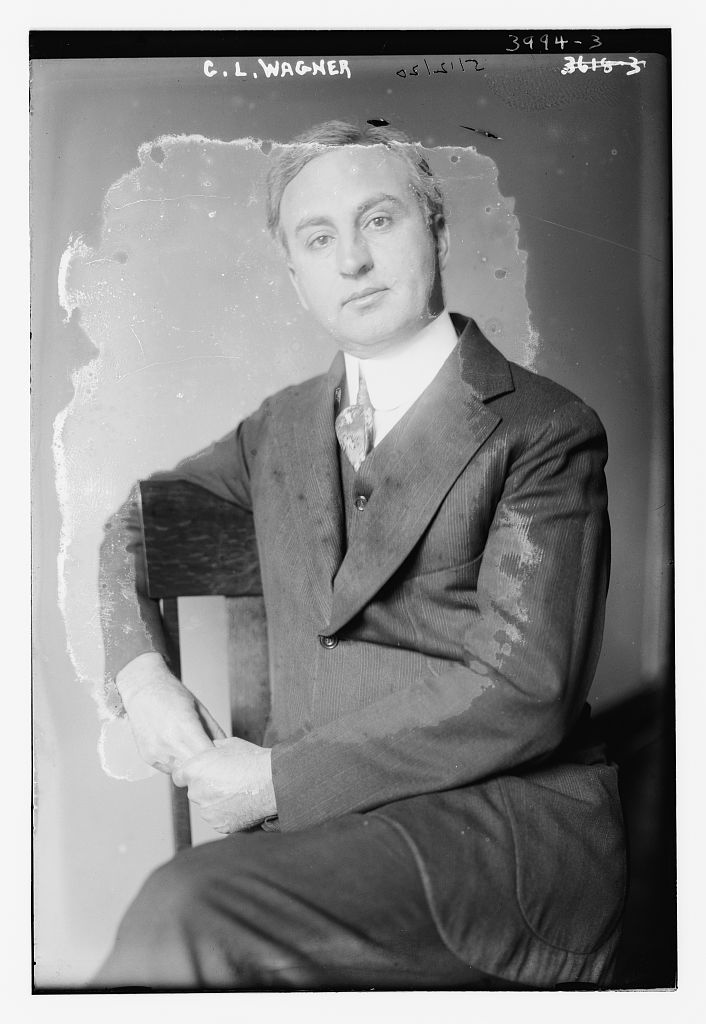
- Wagner in 1916
- Born: 1869
- Died: February 25, 1956 (aged 86–87); New York City, New York, U.S.
- Other names: Chas. L. Wagner, C. L. Wagner
- Occupations: Concert impresario, theater producer

Charles Ludwig Wagner (1869 – February 25, 1956) was an American concert impresario and theater producer. He managed John McCormack and Mary Garden, and introduced Walter Gieseking. He founded the Charles L. Wagner Opera Company.

== Biography ==
He was born on September 20, 1868 in Illinois. He grew up in Shelbyville. His parents were from Wuerttemberg. They have no living descendants. His niece Grace B. Wagner was an opera singer and pianist.

In the 1920s, he worked as a Broadway theatre producer in New York City.

Wagner authored an autobiography detailing his experiences as a manager of speakers and performing artists, Seeing Stars (1940), published by G. P. Putnam's Sons, New York.

He died at age 87 of a short illness on February 25, 1956, at Roosevelt Hospital (now Mount Sinai West) in New York City.
