= Shaub =

Shaub is a surname. Notable people with the surname include:

- Benjamin Franklin Shaub (1841–1913), American educator and businessman
- Walter Shaub (born 1971), American lawyer
