= Ernesto Tamayo =

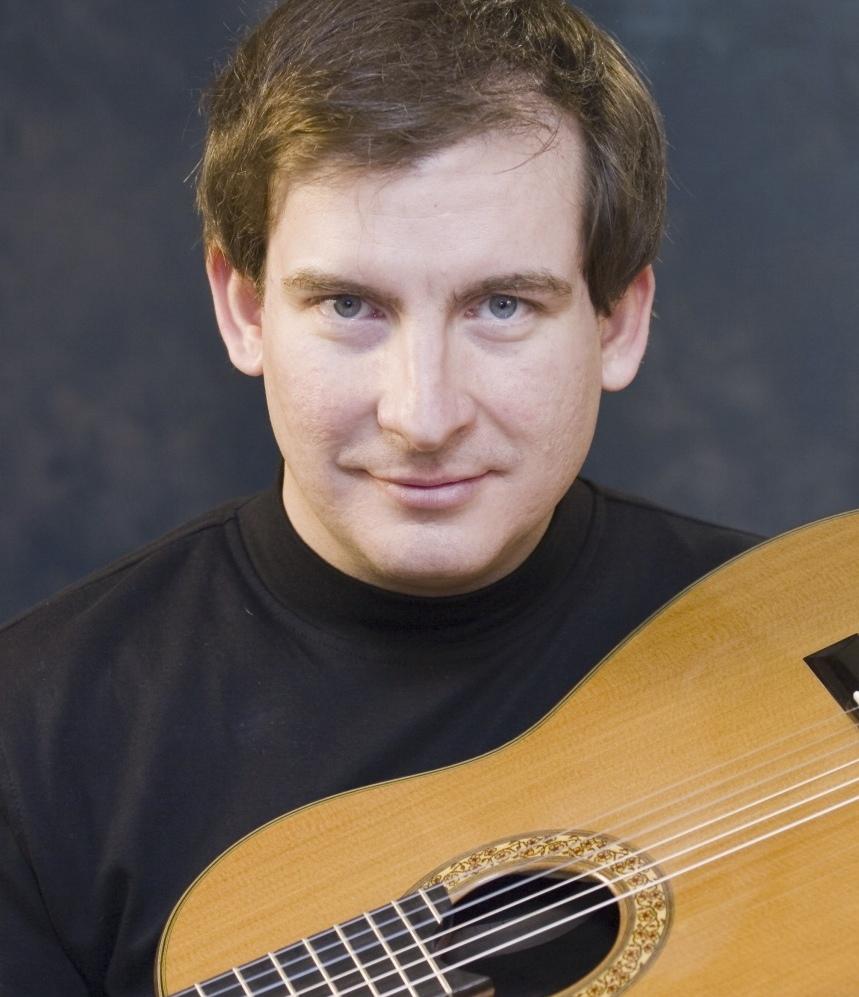
- Tamayo in 2009

Background information
- Born: 18 September 1971
- Origin: Havana, Cuba
- Died: 17 October 2014 (aged 43)
- Genres: Classical music
- Occupation: Guitarist
- Instrument: Classical Guitar
- Years active: 1995–2014
- Website: http://www.ernestotamayo.com

Ernesto Tamayo (18 September 1971 – 17 October 2014) was a Cuban classical guitarist who toured extensively throughout North and South America and Europe.

== Biography ==
Born in Havana, Cuba, Tamayo began studying the guitar with his father when he was five. He made his television debut at the age of nine.

In 1995, Sony Music Entertainment and Sony Classical of Mexico enabled Tamayo to come to the United States. He received a full scholarship for advanced studies at The Peabody Conservatory with world-renowned guitarist Manuel Barrueco. In Cuba, Tamayo studied with world-renowned composer and guitarist Leo Brouwer and Antonio Alberto Rodriguez.

Since he arrived in the United States, Tamayo performed in numerous concert series and with orchestras in the United States and abroad. In September 1999, he made his Carnegie Hall debut with a sold-out performance. Past engagements at guitar festivals include appearances at the Fourth International Guitar Festival in Cuernavaca, Mexico, the Sixth International Guitar Festival in Long Island, New York, the "Classical Guitarists of the World" concert series in Fullerton, California and the Connecticut Guitar Summer Workshop. He has also given solo recitals at the Kennedy Center as well as for the classical guitar societies of Baltimore, Miami, Reno, Cheyenne, and Northern Colorado, among others.

His album "The Cuban Guitarist," released in 2005 features two world premier recordings: The Havana Suite by Cuban composer Aldo Rodriguez, and Five Inspirations composed by Tamayo himself. The "Classical Persuasions" album was released in September 2006. On this album, Tamayo features works by Borges, Canonigos, Lauro, Weiss, Sor, Brouwer, Albeniz, Rodrigo, and Tarrega. His album "Artistico" was released on December 2, 2007.

Tamayo is a recipient of career development grants from the Maryland State Arts Council, the New York Foundation for the Arts, and the Bossak/Heilbron Foundation. He has been sponsored in the past by The Bacardi Foundation, Del Mar Foundation, and La Bella Strings. He has performed and recorded with guitars made by Thomas Humphrey, David Daily, and Stephan Connor.

In 1997 Tamayo was appointed Chairman of the guitar department at The Pennsylvania Academy of Music in Lancaster, Pennsylvania. His students have been accepted into music schools such as the Peabody Conservatory in Baltimore, Maryland, and Indiana University.

Ernesto Tamayo died on 17 October 2014 after a year-long battle with brain cancer.

== Discography ==
- Ernesto Tamayo Plays Bach (1998)
- Melodias Cubanas (2000)
- The Cuban Guitarist (2005)
- Classical Persuasions (2006)
- Artistico (2007)
- El Poema de la Rosa (2010)
