= Rupp Cup =

College comparison
Category	Franklin & Marshall College	Millersville University
Affiliation	Private (liberal arts)	Public (liberal arts)
Location	Lancaster, PA	Millersville, PA
Undergraduate students	2,324	7,424
School colors	Blue and white	Black and gold
Nickname	Diplomats	Marauders
Arena	Mayser Gymnasium	Pucillo Gymnasium
Head coach	Mike Rogers	Kerry Regner
Championship	NCAA Division I	NCAA Division II
Conference	EIWA	PSAC

The Rupp Cup is a traveling trophy that is held by the winner of the annual collegiate wrestling dual meet between Franklin & Marshall College and Millersville University. The two schools, located in Lancaster County, Pennsylvania, are less than five miles from each other.

Though the two programs had a long history of competing against one another, the rivalry wasn't formally christened until the 2008 season with the formation of the Rupp Cup by both schools.

The rivalry is unique in that Franklin & Marshall College is a Division-III (non-scholarship) school that elects to showcase their wrestling program in Division I and Millersville is a Division-II school. As a result, Millersville competes in a lower division than Franklin & Marshall but Millersville is permitted to offer scholarships while Franklin & Marshall, as a Division-III school, is barred from offering scholarships to their wrestlers. (At the time of the formation of the Rupp Cup, both schools were 'showcasing' their wrestling programs in Division 1.)

== Rivalry name ==
The trophy is named after Dr. Theodore H. Rupp, a 1934 graduate of Franklin and Marshall College where he was a member of the wrestling team.

Rupp founded the wrestling program at Millersville University where he led the program for twelve seasons. He also had the unique distinction of simultaneously coaching the wrestling programs at both schools during the 1948–49 season where he finished with a combined season record of 20–2. It is believed to be the only instance of a collegiate wrestling coach leading two programs in the same season. He concluded his collegiate coaching career with a 76–20–2 record.

In addition to his bachelor's degree from Franklin & Marshall, Rupp was a Fulbright scholar with a master's degree from the Pennsylvania State University and a doctorate from the University of Pennsylvania. He went on to a long career as a faculty member at Millersville University where he taught French and served as chairmen of the language department, retiring in 1982.

In providing thanks for his many years of service in French language and culture, he was knighted and became "Chevalier dans L'Ordre des Palmes Academiques", the highest award given by the French government to a private citizen of a foreign nation.

Rupp is a member of the Pennsylvania Wrestling Hall of Fame.

On February 10, 2010, Rupp died at the age of 94.

== Cup history ==
RUPP CUP HISTORY
Date	Score				Location	Series	Winning coach
February 2, 2008	Millersville	31	Franklin & Marshall	16	Mayser Gymnasium; Lancaster, PA	1-0	Todd Roberts (1)
Feb 20, 2009	Millersville	23	Franklin & Marshall	18	Pucillo Gym; Millersville, PA	2-0	Todd Roberts (2)
Feb 19. 2010	Millersville	29	Franklin & Marshall	16	Mayser Gymnasium; Lancaster, PA	3-0	Todd Roberts (3)
Feb. 18, 2011	Franklin & Marshall	22	Millersville	13	Pucillo Gym; Millersville, PA	3-1	Mike Rogers (1)
Feb 17, 2012	Franklin & Marshall	29	Millersville	13	Mayser Gymnasium; Lancaster, PA	3-2	Mike Rogers (2)
Feb 15, 2013	Franklin & Marshall	25	Millersville	12	Pucillo Gym; Millersville, PA	3-3	Mike Rogers (3)
Feb 21, 2014	Franklin & Marshall	41	Millersville	3	Mayser Gymnasium; Lancaster, PA	4-3	Mike Rogers (4)
Feb 19, 2015	Franklin & Marshall	24	Millersville	12	Pucillo Gym; Millersville, PA	5-3	Mike Rogers (5)
Feb 18, 2016	Franklin & Marshall	25	Millersville	13	Mayser Gymnasium; Lancaster, PA	6-3	Mike Rogers (6)

Note: The 2011–12 season was Millersville's last season as a Division-I wrestling program. Prior to the reclassification, wrestling was the only Division-I sport at the school. Currently, all varsity sports at Millersville compete as Division-II programs.
