= Eliphalet Oram Lyte =

Creator of Row Row Row Your Boat (1842-1913)

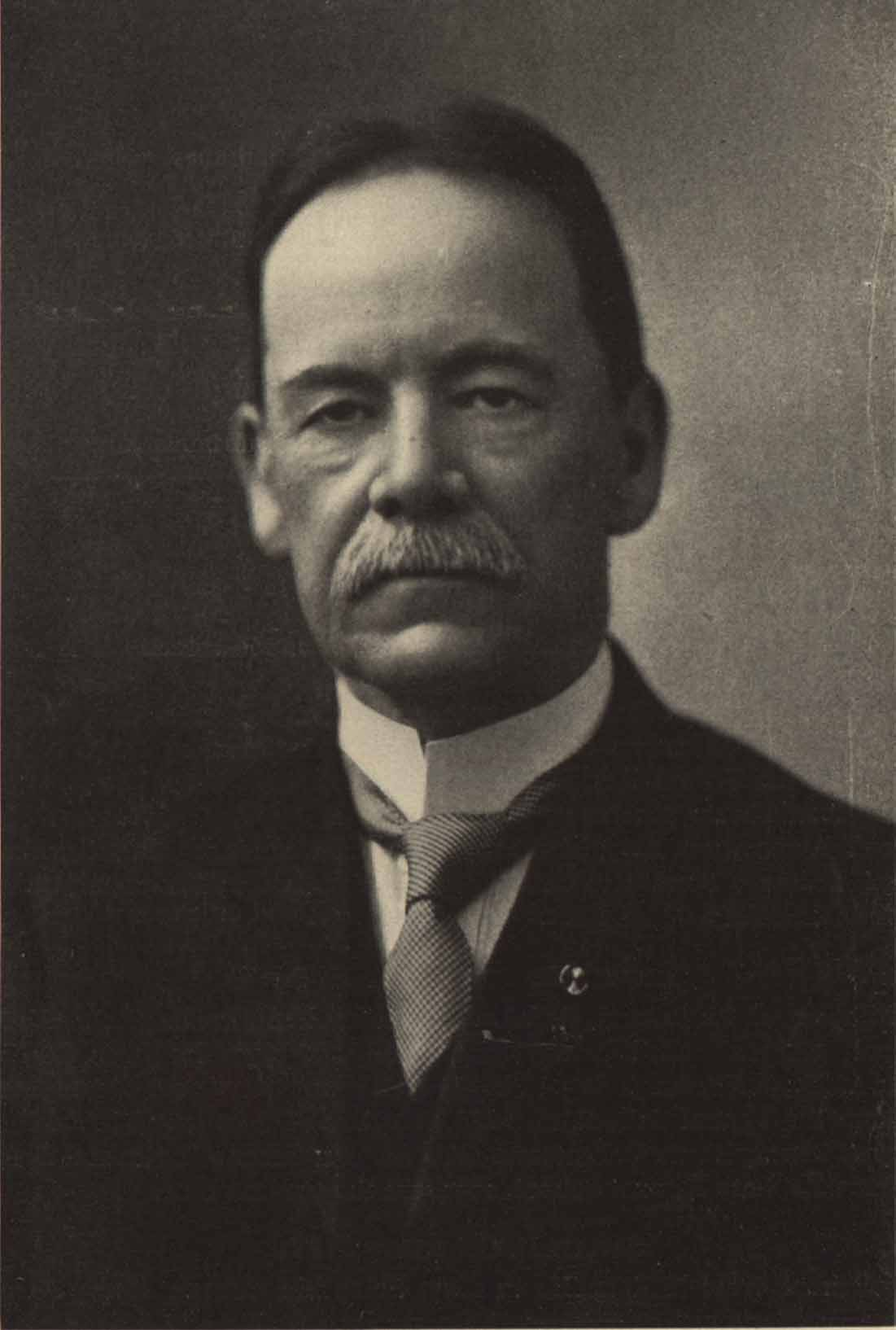
- Born: Eliphalet Oman Lyte; June 29, 1842; Bird-in-Hand, Pennsylvania
- Died: January 3, 1913 (aged 70); Lancaster, Pennsylvania
- Resting place: Greenwood Cemetery, Lancaster, Pennsylvania
- Occupations: Teacher, Author
- Known for: Creator of Row Row Row Your Boat

Eliphalet Oram Lyte (June 29, 1842 – January 3, 1913) was an American teacher and author of grammar and composition textbooks. He is credited as the composer of the tune to the popular song "Row, Row, Row Your Boat" in the publication The Franklin Square Song Collection (1881, New York). It is also indicated that he adapted the lyrics, previously published to a different melody.

== Biography ==
Lyte was born near Bird-in-Hand in Lancaster County, Pennsylvania, taught there in Millersville, Pennsylvania, and died there on January 3, 1913. Dr. Lyte entered the Millersville State Normal School in 1866 after serving in the Civil War and teaching for two years. He became professor of rhetoric and bookkeeping in 1868 and later a professor of pedagogy and grammar before being named principal. He was associated with the school for 44 years before his resignation due to ill health. Credited for the first building boom at Millersville, he designed and directed the construction of the Science Building (since removed), the Library (currently Biemesderfer Executive Center) and the Gymnasium (now Dutcher Hall). He also oversaw the construction of the Model School, formerly Myers Hall and now Charles and Mary Hash Building.

His textbooks include:

- Grammar and Composition for Common Schools
- Advanced Grammar and Composition

== See also ==
- Row, Row, Row Your Boat
- Lyte (surname)
