= Pennsylvania Academy of Music =

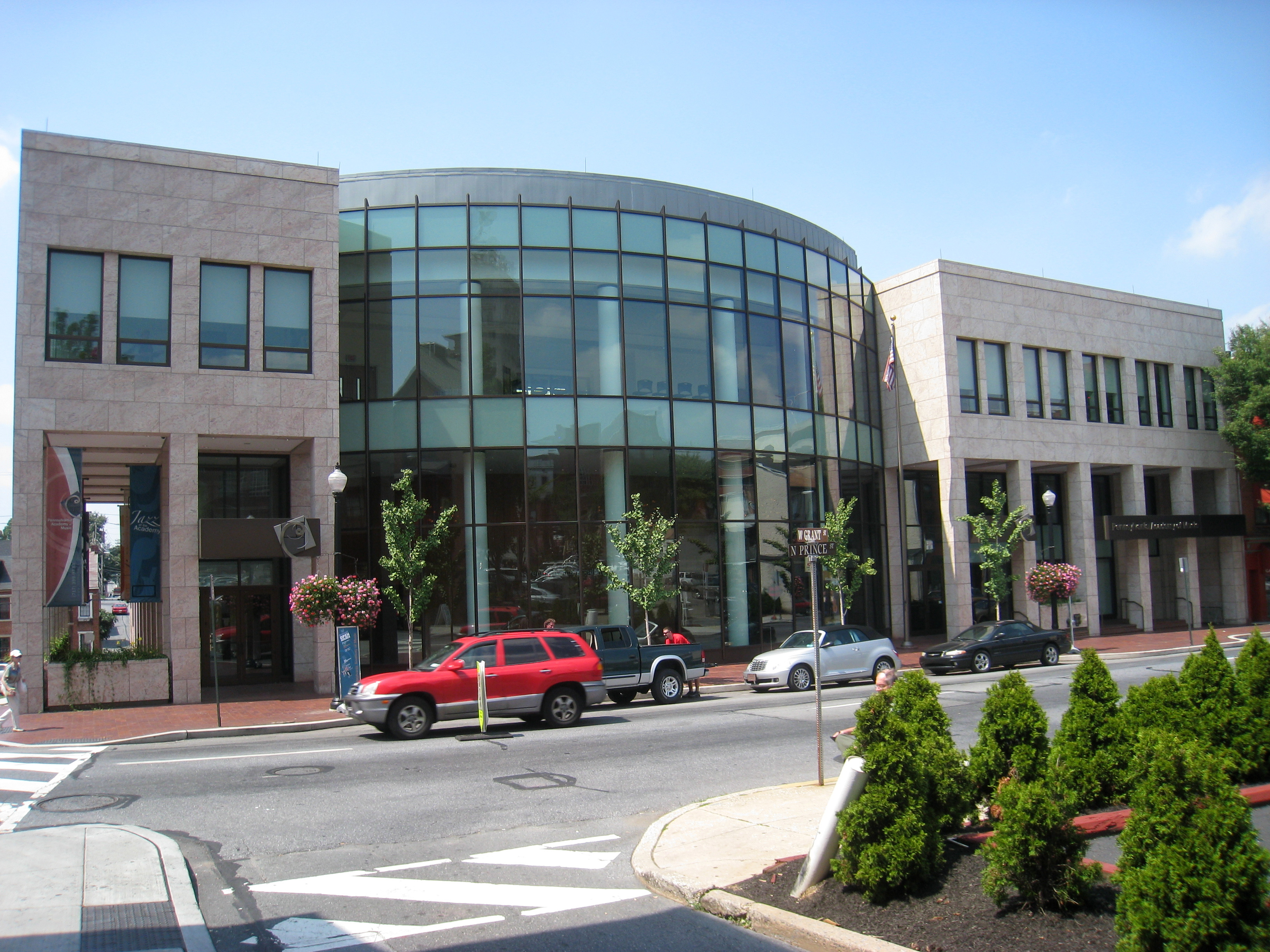
Pennsylvania Academy of Music, Lancaster, Pennsylvania, USA.

The Pennsylvania Academy of Music (PAM) was a private music school located at 42-44 North Prince Street in Lancaster, Pennsylvania. Founded by concert piano duo Francis Veri and Michael Jamanis, the academy provided music instruction to students with skill levels ranging from elementary to advanced. It opened in February 1991 on the premises of the Wolf Museum of Music and Art on Chestnut St, before moving to its facilities on Prince Street in 1992. It continued to operate until 2011 when it closed after declaring bankruptcy in 2010. The school was accredited by the National Association of Schools of Music beginning in 2003.

== History ==
The Pennsylvania Academy of Music (PAM) was a 501(c)(3) nonprofit incorporated in 1989. It was founded by pianists Francis Veri and Michael Jamanis. Modeled after the education philosophy of the Fontainebleau Schools, it housed students of all skill levels that were encouraged to interact and learn from one another. It opened in February 1991 with an initial enrollment of 50 students and a faculty of 12. The school initially met at the Wolf Museum of Music and Art on Chestnut St. By December 1991 the school's enrollment had grown to more than 100 students.

In April 1992 it was announced that PAM was purchasing the headquarters of the Pinnacle Mortgage Investment Corporation at 42-44. North Prince Street in downtown Lancaster, and that the building would be transformed into the premises for PAM. An open house for the school's new location on Prince St. was held on October 4, 1992. Pianist Hwaen Ch'uqi (then known as Jeff Tomlinson) was the first student to perform a concert at PAM's new headquarters; inaugurating Pam's recital hall on October 18, 1992. The school began awarding scholarships in September 1992 through funds raised by faculty members performing benefit concerts. One such faculty member to lend his talents was baritone John Darrenkamp who was teaching at the school part time while a singer at the Metropolitan Opera in New York.

In the summer of 1992 Nancy Tanger gifted to PAM a historic home on Marietta Ave., known as the "Romantic House", that was built in 1897. The home, renamed the Tanger House, became a space to house faculty traveling in to teach from out of town, and a space to hold gatherings of various kinds for the school.

By 2004, more than 400 students were enrolled at PAM, and it was announced that year that a new expanded facility would be built for the school designed by architects Philip Johnson and Alan Ritchie. The school had earlier been awarded six million dollars by the Government of Pennsylvania as directed by then governor Mark Schweiker in 2002 for the purposes of expanding the school, and had raised another six and a half million dollars through other means towards the project. The new building, costing 25 million dollars, was completed in 2008 and officially opened in a ceremony given on June 11 of that year. The financial costs of the building, rising to 36 million, burdened the school, and ultimately led to its closure.

On May 27, 2010, PAM filed Chapter 11 bankruptcy. Under new administration, the Bankruptcy Court supported the re-opening the school on September 1, 2010, at Liberty Place. PAM continued to work with the Court as they tried to transition out of bankruptcy and make progress toward operating as a sustainable institution. On Wednesday, March 30, 2011, PAM chairman Dr. Thomas Godfrey announced the board of directors' decision to close the academy. The school's final day of music classes was March 31, 2011. The building PAM occupied on Prince Street in downtown Lancaster was purchased by the Pennsylvania Department of General Services is now leased by Millersville University. It operates as the Ware Center.

== Education ==
In 2003 PAM became accredited by National Association of Schools of Music (NASM). PAM was one of twelve pre-collegiate autonomous schools accredited by NASM, and was a member of the National Guild of the Community Schools of the Arts. It was one of the only schools in the United States that offers a pre-collegiate program in chamber music.

In 2009, the school entered into partnerships with the China Conservatory of Music in Beijing and Lancaster Mennonite School in Lancaster. An exchange program was offered through the China Conservatory, and a high school diploma program focused in music is offered through Lancaster Mennonite High School.

== Faculty ==
=== Piano ===
- Mark Huber
- Jody Norton
- Dr. Ioannis Potamousis, Chair
- Dr. Ju-Ping Song
- Dr. Ina Grapenthin

=== Strings ===
- Dr. Michael T. Jamanis (son of the pianist), violin
- Simon Andreas Maurer, violin
- Ning Mu, viola/violin
- Sara Male, cello, Chair

=== Winds and percussion ===
- Stephen Goss, percussion, Chair
- Dr. Matthew Allison, flute
- Rainer Beckmann, recorder
- Doris Hall-Gulati, clarinet
- Ryan Kauffman, saxophone

=== Voice ===
- John Darrenkamp

=== Music Theory ===
- Sam Bellardo

=== Other ===
- Ernesto Tamayo, guitar
- Dr. Matthew Allison, theory/composition
- Walter Blackburn, solfege/rythmique
- Mark Huber, jazz
- Dr. Ina Grapenthin, early development
- Heather Witmer Kares, staff accompanist
