= Millersville University =

Public university in Millersville, Pennsylvania, U.S.

Coordinates: 40°N 76.356°W

Millersville University of Pennsylvania
- Former names: Lancaster County Normal School (1855–1859); Millersville State Normal School (1859–1927); Millersville State Teachers College (1927–1959); Millersville State College (1959–1983)
- Motto: Seize the Opportunity
- Type: Public liberal arts master's level doctoral level
- Established: 1855; 171 years ago
- Endowment: $51.5 million (2024)
- President: Daniel A. Wubah
- Faculty: 299 full-time
- Administrative staff: 540 staff and administration
- Undergraduates: 6,500
- Postgraduates: 1,000
- Location: Millersville, Pennsylvania, U.S.
- Campus: Suburban, 250 acres (100 ha)
- Colors: Black and gold
- Nickname: Marauders
- Sporting affiliations: NCAA Division II – PSAC
- Mascots: Millersville Marauder and Skully (Marauders)
- Website: millersville.edu

Millersville University of Pennsylvania, commonly known as Millersville University (MU) or The Ville, is a public university in Millersville, Pennsylvania. It is one of the ten schools that comprise the Pennsylvania State System of Higher Education (PASSHE). First established in 1854 as the Millersville Academy out of the since-demolished Old Main, the academy specialized in a series of workshop-style teacher institutes in response to the 1834 Free School Act of Pennsylvania. It was the first normal school in Pennsylvania.

== History ==
Millersville University was established in 1855 as the "Lancaster County Normal School", the first state normal school in Pennsylvania. It subsequently changed its name to "Millersville State Normal School" in 1859 and Millersville later became a state teachers' college in 1927. It was renamed "Millersville State College" in 1959 and officially became the Millersville University of Pennsylvania in 1983.

The original Old Main of 1854

In November 1852, the Lancaster County Educational Association met in Strasburg to form an institute for teacher training. The first institute, which led to the Lancaster County Normal School and received significant support from Thomas H. Burrowes, was held in January 1853. While the Association was working to organize, Lewis M. Hobbs, a popular teacher of the Manor district, lobbied heavily in Manor township for a more permanent training facility for teachers. Jacob Shenk, a local farmer, donated a tract of five acres (the present-day site of Ganser Library, Biemesderfer Executive Center, and Dutcher Hall) with Hobbs collecting investments from local residents. On April 17, 1855, Lancaster County Normal School opened with James P. Wickersham as principal and a peak of 147 teachers in attendance. The school president was Thomas H. Burrowes and the vice president was Lewis M. Hobbs. November 5, 1855, marked the start of the first full session, with a new expansion of the original Academy building that made 96 rooms available for nearly 200 students and their teachers.

Completed in 1894, the Biemesderfer Executive Center, also known as the Old Library, is the centerpiece of Millersville University's campus. The executive committee of the Board of Trustees designated $27,500 for the construction of the library in 1891, with the contract awarded to Lancastrian D.H. Rapp, who submitted the lowest bid in a blind auction.

The Millersville University Library is housed in Ganser Hall. In September 2011, the university closed Ganser Hall for two years for renovations. On August 26, 2013, the Ganser Library reopened as the McNairy Library and Learning Forum at Ganser Hall.

=== School principals ===
- John Fair Stoddard (1855–1856)
- James Pyle Wickersham (1856–1866)
- Edward Brooks (1866–1883)
- Benjamin Franklin Shaub (1883–1887)
- Eliphalet Oram Lyte (1887–1912)
- Peter Monroe Harbold (1912–1918)
- Charles H. Gordinier (1918–1928)

=== College/university presidents ===
- Charles H. Gordinier (1928–1929)
- Landis Tanger (1929–1943)
- D. Luke Biemesderfer (1943–1965)
- Robert A. Christie (1965–1968)
- William H. Duncan (1968–1981)
- Joseph A. Caputo (1981–2003)
- Francine G. McNairy (2003–2013)
- John M. Anderson (2013–2018)
- Daniel A. Wubah (2018–)

== Campus ==
=== Lombardo Welcome Center ===
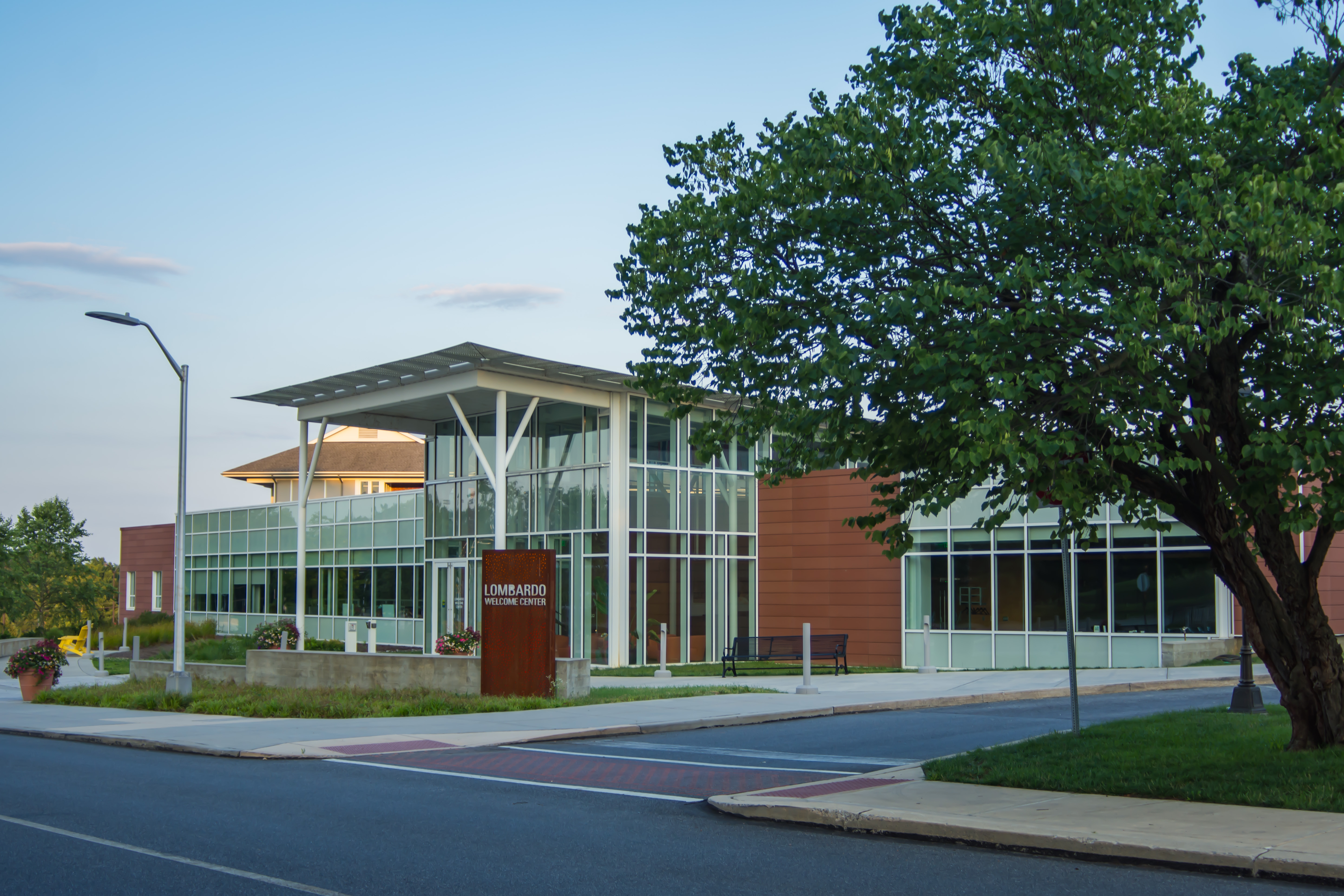
The Lombardo Welcome Center at Millersville University

On August 29, 2015, local community members Samuel and Dena Lombardo announced a gift to Millersville University for the creation of the university's new Welcome Center and the first state-of-the-art Net-Zero energy building on campus. This building, named the Lombardo Welcome Center, opened in January 2018. Equipped with solar panels, state-of-the-art energy-efficient glass, and an interior design inspired by feng shui principles, the Lombardo Welcome Center will produce as much energy as it consumes.

=== Awards Received for Lombardo Welcome Center ===
The Lombardo Welcome Center has received multiple awards for its sustainability and design, including the Zero Energy Certification from the International Living Future Institute (making it the first building in Pennsylvania to do so), the Engineering Excellence Grand Award from the American Council of Engineering Companies (ACEC), and the Award of Excellence from the AIA Eastern PA.

=== Francine G. McNairy Library & Learning Forum ===
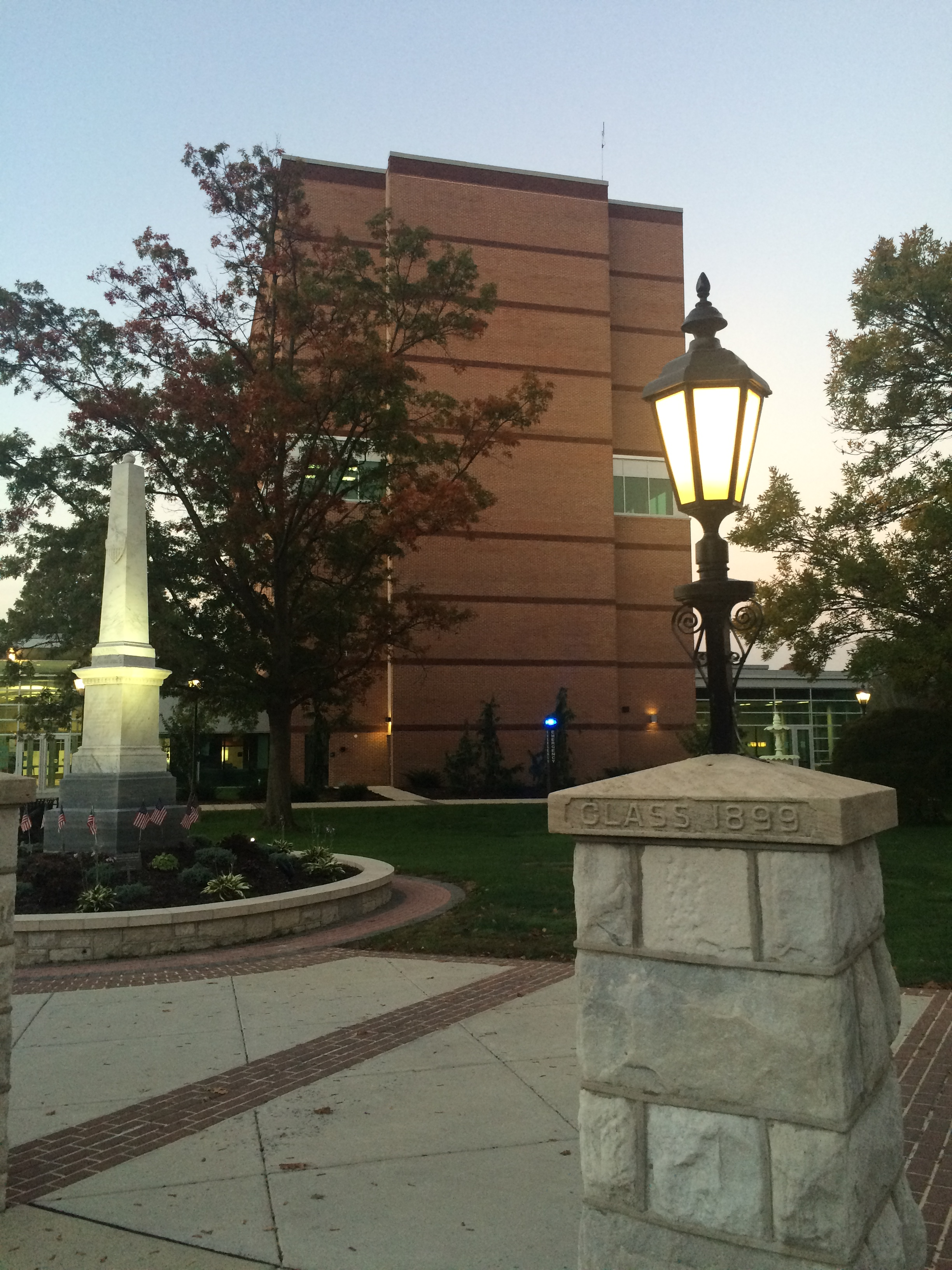
McNairy Library at Millersville University

Originally built from 1965 to 1967 on the grounds of Old Main, the Helen Ganser Library closed its doors in 2011 for an extensive 2-year renovation project and re-opened in 2013 as the Francine G. McNairy Library & Learning Forum. The entire complex is named after Millersville's 13th president, Francine McNairy, who began her career at Millersville first as Provost and Vice President of Academic Affairs before becoming president in 2003. Ganser Hall, named for Helen A. Ganser (1911–1952), librarian and head of the Library Science Department, is the 9-story building that houses the university's academic collection. Serving as the academic heart of campus for over 40 years, Ganser Hall began with the two famous "Bookwalks" of 1967.

== Performing arts ==
Millersville University operates two visual and performing arts centers in Lancaster County: The Ware Center for the Arts and Winter Visual & Performing Arts Center.

=== Winter Visual & Performing Arts Center ===
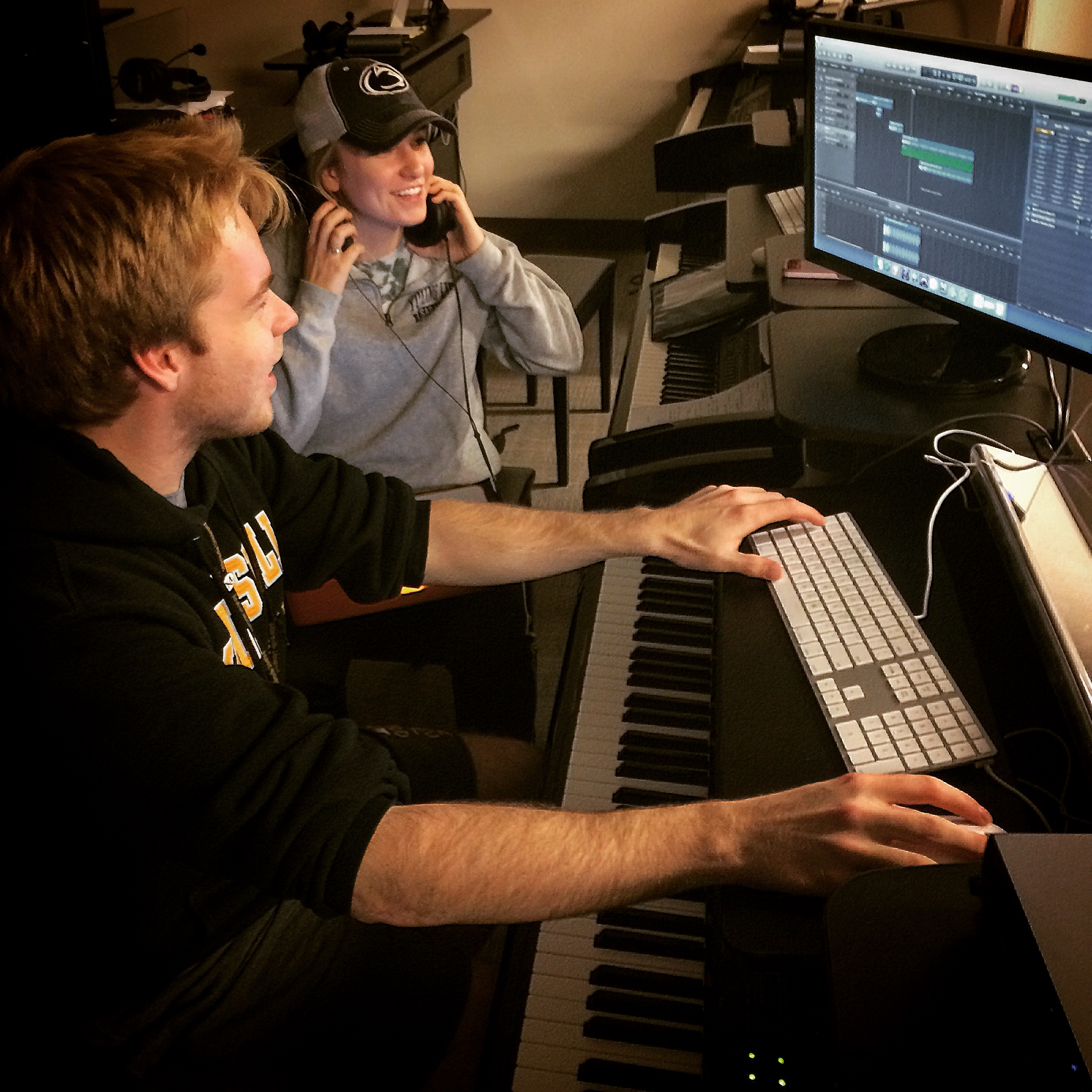
Millersville University Music Students utilizing the tech in the piano lab

Built as an expansion of Lyte Auditorium in Alumni Hall, the new Charles R. and Anita B Winter Visual and Performing Arts Center has a new entrance off Cottage Avenue in Millersville. The grand opening occurred on Friday, October 12, 2012, after two years of renovations to the original structure, Lyte Auditorium. Named for local philanthropist Charles Winter, whose daughters are both Millersville graduates, (Note: Local philanthropist Charles Winter, a retired orthopedic surgeon, donated $1 million to Millersville University in 2007 to support renovations and additions to Lyte Auditorium. Two of his daughters graduated from Millersville.) the new Visual and Performing Arts Center, a $26 million construction and renovation project, enhances the original 29,041-square-foot building of 700 seats with a 59,452-square-foot addition. Part of the university's master plan to effectively use and reuse existing land, facilities, and infrastructure, the new Winter Visual & Performing Arts Center houses features a concert hall, recital hall, performance hall, classrooms, a recording studio, piano lab, a music library, faculty offices and more. Known by students as the VPAC (for Visual and Performing Arts Building), other features of the state-of-the-art building are a scenery shop, soundproof classrooms, several sitting areas, a music library and approximately 20 Soundlok rooms, which are modular sound-isolation rooms for practicing.

=== Ware Center For The Arts ===
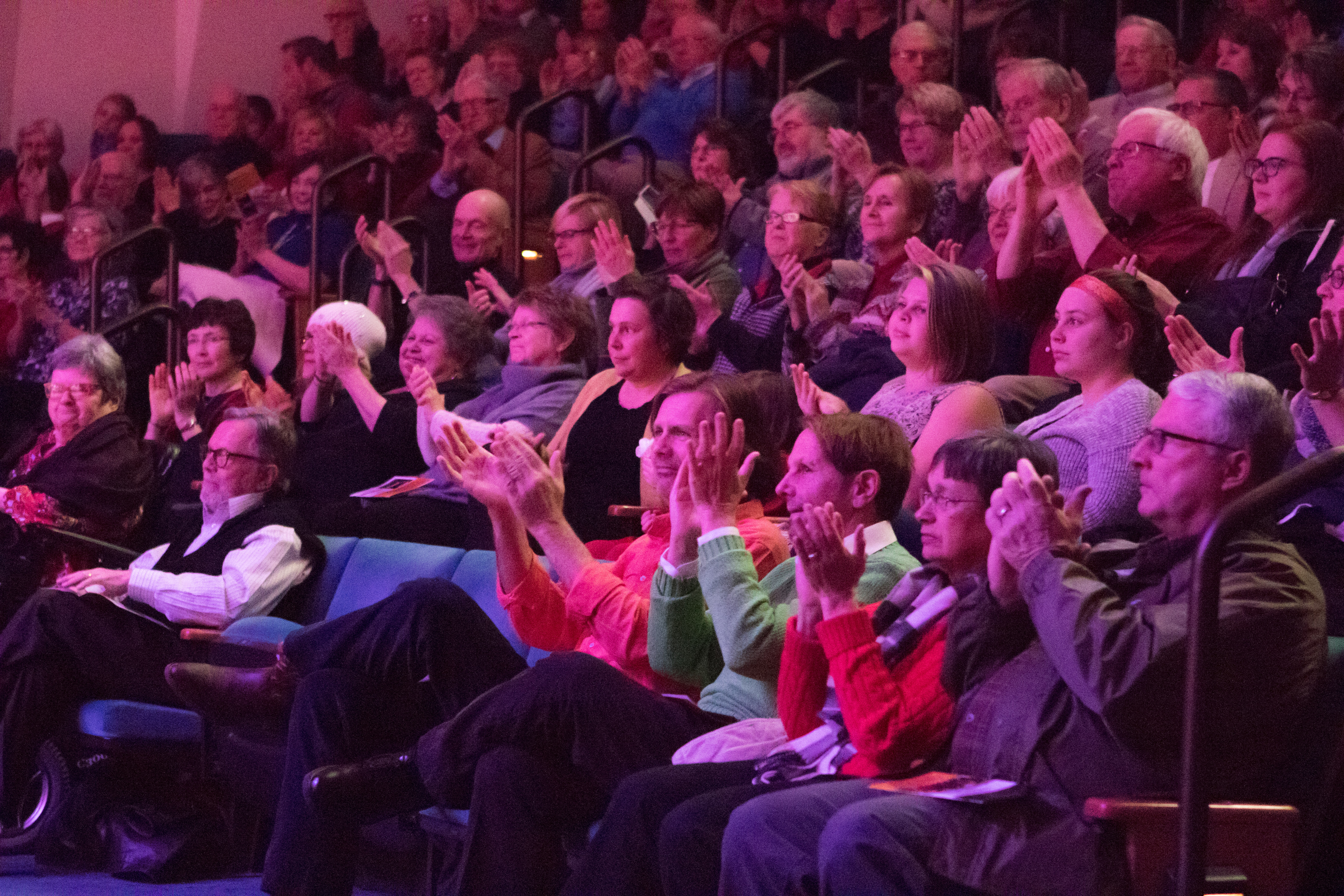
A crowd watches a performance at The Ware Center for the Arts

The Ware Center for the Arts is a performing arts center in the Lancaster city campus of the university. Located on North Prince Street at the end of Lancaster's Gallery Row, the center is part of the Millersville University's Department of Visual & Performing Arts. Originally designed by architect Philip Johnson, the $32 million building opened in 2008 as the home of the now defunct Pennsylvania Academy of Music. Since 2010, it has hosted classes for nearly 1,000 Millersville University students during Fall and Spring semesters. Various art exhibits and live performances are held at this venue throughout the year, and the facility can be rented out as a private event venue and banquet hall.

== Academics ==
Undergraduate demographics as of Fall 2023
Race and ethnicity	Total
White	73%
Hispanic	11%
Black	9%
Asian	3%
International student	2%
Two or more races	1%
Unknown	1%
Economic diversity
Low-income (Note: The percentage of students who received an income-based federal Pell grant intended for low-income students.)	27%
Affluent (Note: The percentage of students who are a part of the American middle class at the bare minimum.)	73%

In 2020-2021, the university offered over 150 bachelor's degree programs, 25 master's degree programs, 3 doctoral degree programs, and 46 certificates and certifications. They were offered across nine colleges and schools:

- College of Science and Technology
- College of Education and Human Services
- College of Arts, Humanities, and Social Sciences
- The Lombardo College of Business
- College of Graduate Studies and Adult Learning
- Honors College
- The Tell School of Music
- Wehrheim School of Nursing
- University College

== Athletics ==
Millersville University sponsors 19 intercollegiate varsity sports which compete in NCAA Division II.

=== Men's ===
- Baseball
- Basketball
- Football
- Golf
- Soccer
- Tennis
- Wrestling (Note: (for rivalry information, see Rupp Cup))

=== Women's ===
- Basketball
- Cross country
- Field hockey (Note: 2014 Division II national champions)
- Golf
- Lacrosse (Note: 1982 AIAW Division III national champion)
- Soccer
- Softball
- Swimming
- Tennis
- Track & field (indoor)
- Track & field (outdoor)
- Volleyball

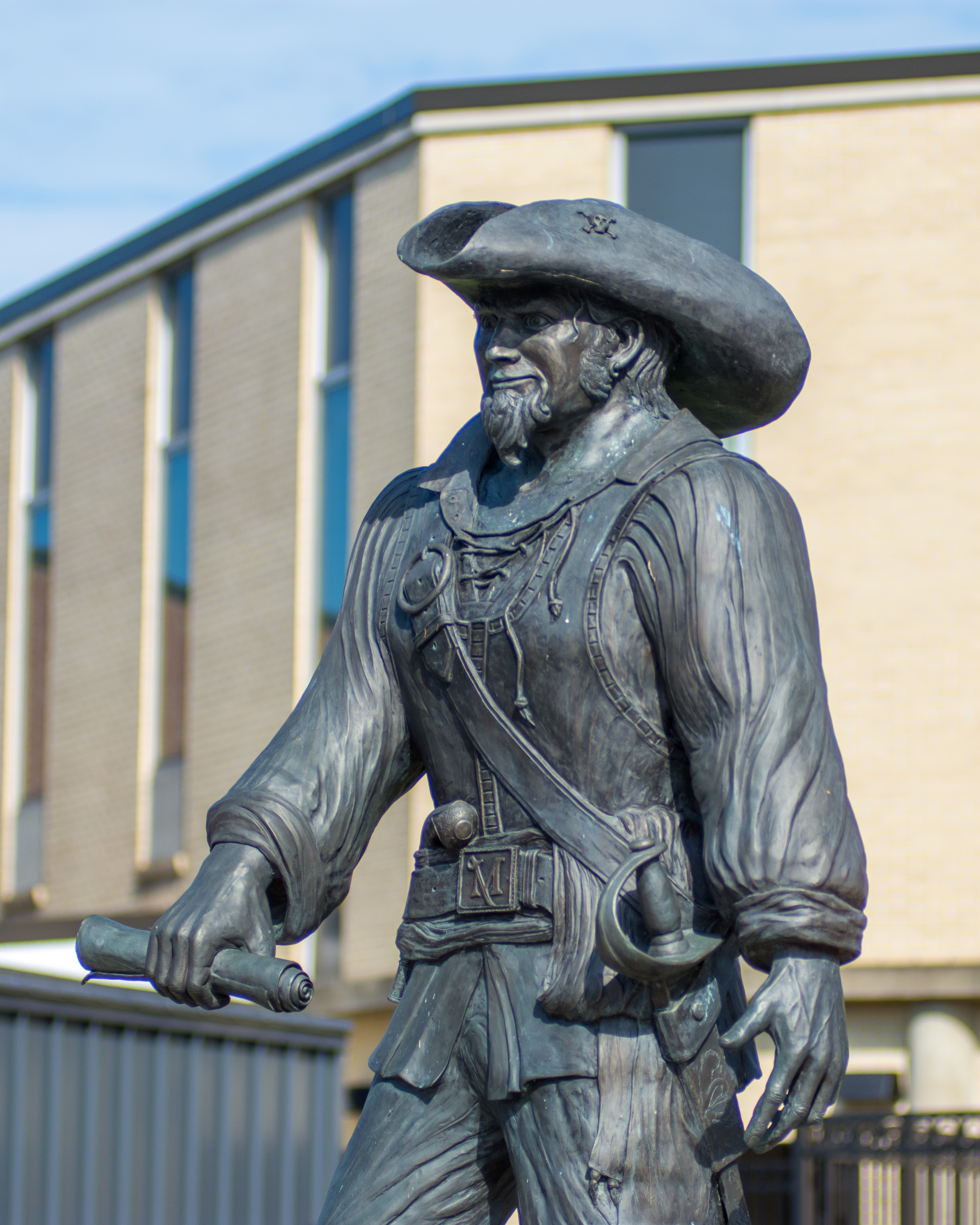
A statue of the Marauder, one of Millersville's mascots

=== Intramural and club teams ===
- Ice hockey club (D2) established 1978
- Ice hockey club (D3) established 2021
- Men's & women's rugby
- Men's club lacrosse
- Men's and women's cycling club
- Men's running club (previously men's cross country – 1981 Division II national champions) (and track & field)
- Men's Club Basketball (established 2021)
- Women's Club Basketball (established 2024)

== Notable alumni ==
=== Art and literature ===
- Joseph Berg Esenwein, editor, lecturer, and writer
- James Hoch (poet), poet
- Jesse Krimes, artist
- Lawrence Nowlan, sculptor

=== Business and industry ===
- John Francis Carroll, newspaper publisher and editor
- Clair McCollough, broadcasting executive

=== Education ===
- Gertrude I. Johnson, co-founder of Johnson and Wales University
- Eliphalet Oram Lyte, teacher for Millersville and wrote modern "Row Row Row Your Boat"
- Mary T. Wales, co-founder of Johnson and Wales University

=== Entertainment and media ===
- Black Thought, musician
- Nicole Brewer, television reporter and anchor
- Malik B, musician
- Bob Van Dillen, meteorologist

=== Politics, government, and military ===
- Guy K. Bard, judge
- Fenimore Chatterton, politician
- Judith Nelson Dilday, judge
- Paul Evanko, police commissioner
- Robert E. Evans, politician
- Mindy Fee, politician
- D. Newlin Fell, judge
- Justin C. Fleming, politician
- Jordan A. Harris, politician
- Umar Johnson, Black activist, psychologist, and motivational speaker
- Chris King, politician
- Don Kilhefner, LGBTQ rights activist, community organizer, and psychologist
- H. Craig Lewis, politician
- John Merriman Reynolds, lawyer, publisher, and politician
- John A. Schlegel, politician
- Meghan Schroeder, politician
- Jere Schuler, politician
- William Preston Snyder, politician
- Bob Walker (Pennsylvania politician), politician
- Gregory B. Williams, judge
- Jacob Zern, physician, judge, and politician

=== Science and medicine ===
- Ward V. Evans, chemist
- Hugh Herr, biophysicist
- Lilian Welsh, physician, educator, suffragist, and advocate for women's health

=== Sports ===
- Dondre Gilliam, professional football player
- Christ Johnson, professional football player
- Jack Kiefer, professional golfer
- Will Lewis, professional football player and executive
- Tim Mayza, professional baseball player
- Chas McCormick, professional baseball player
- Elijah Obade, professional basketball player
- Robb Riddick, professional football player
- Sean Scott, professional football player
- Jim Todd, professional baseball player

== Gallery ==
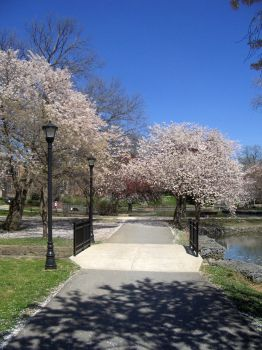
Pond

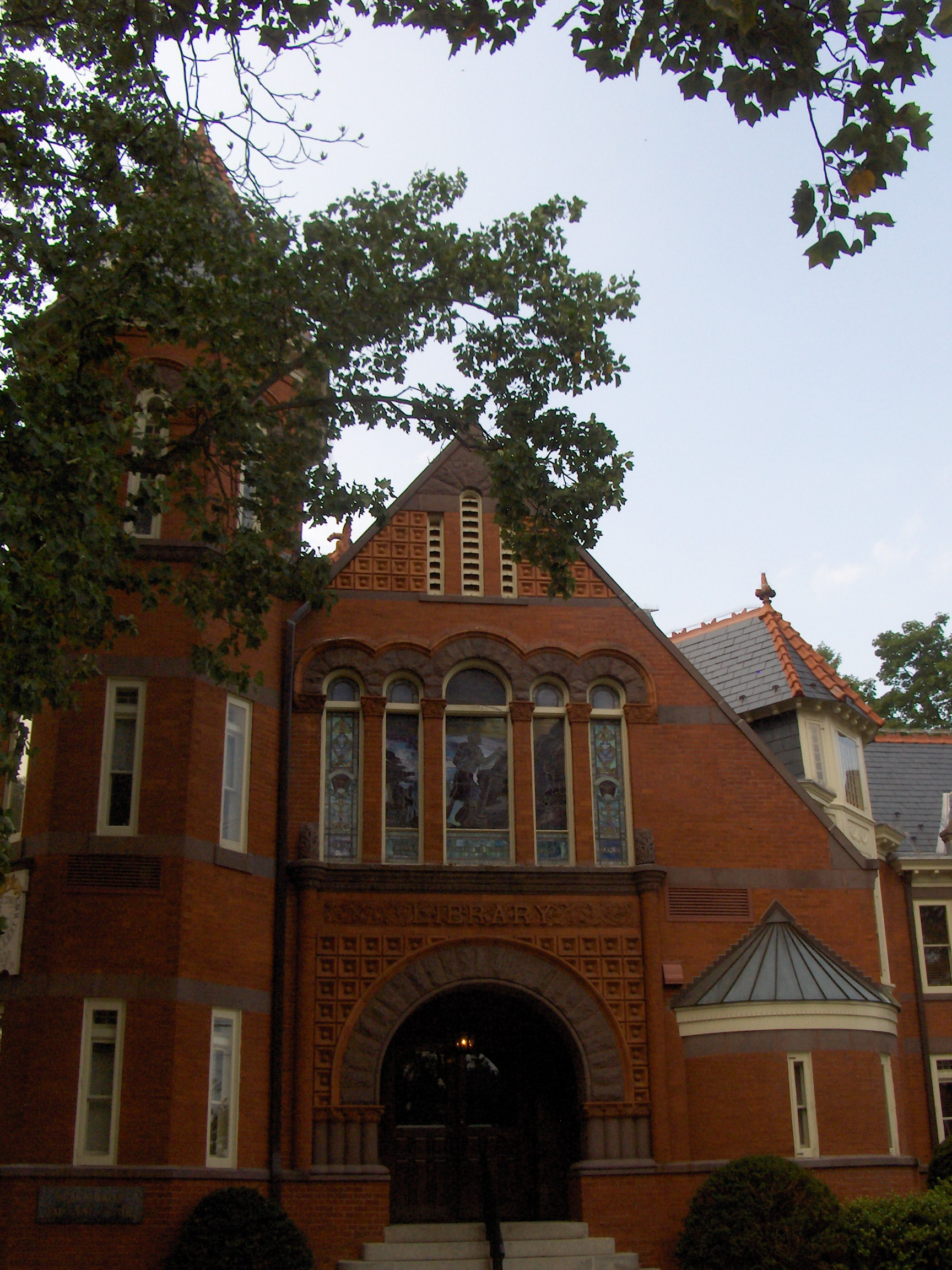
Biemesderfer main entrance

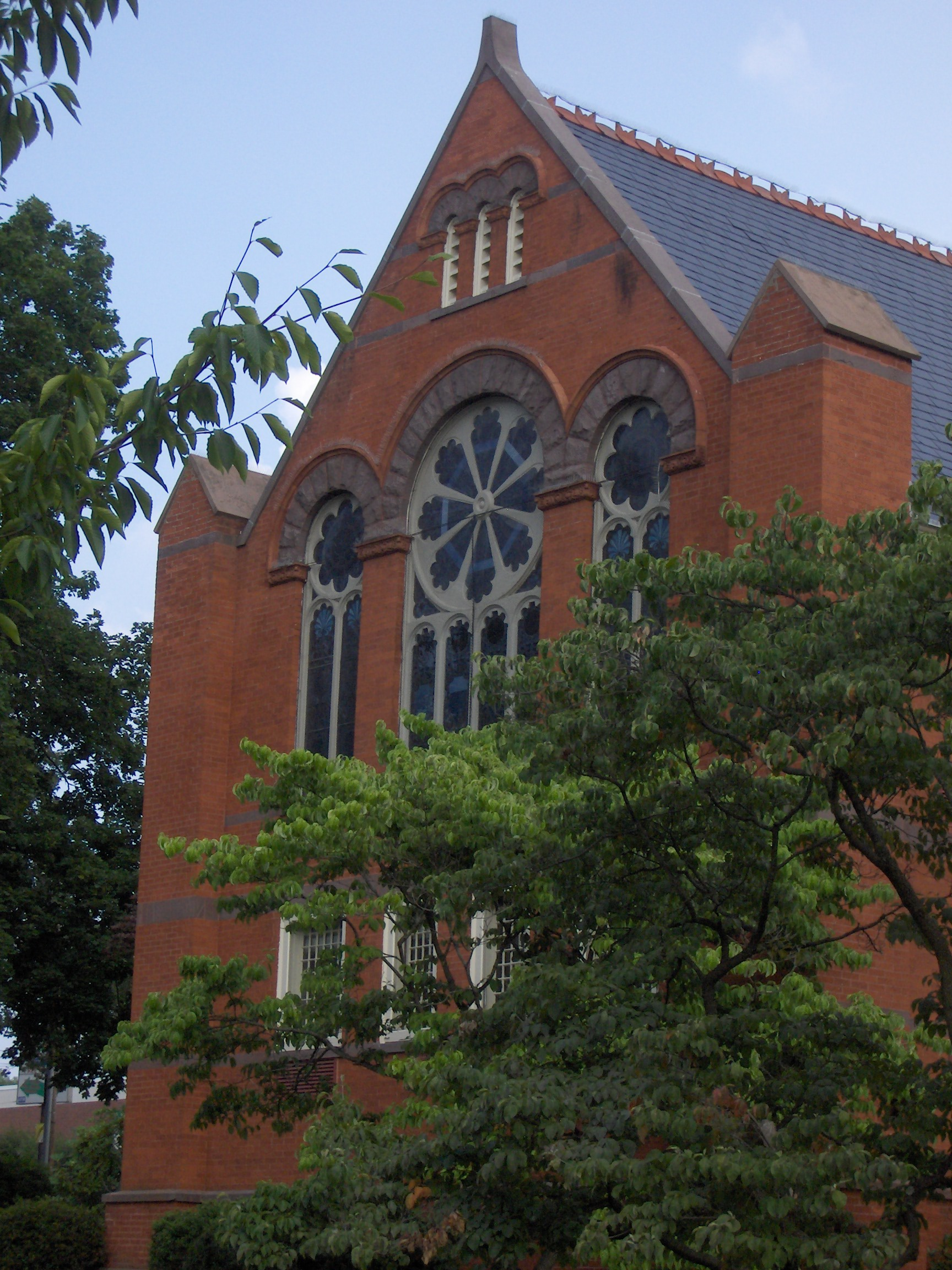
The oculus of Biemesderfer

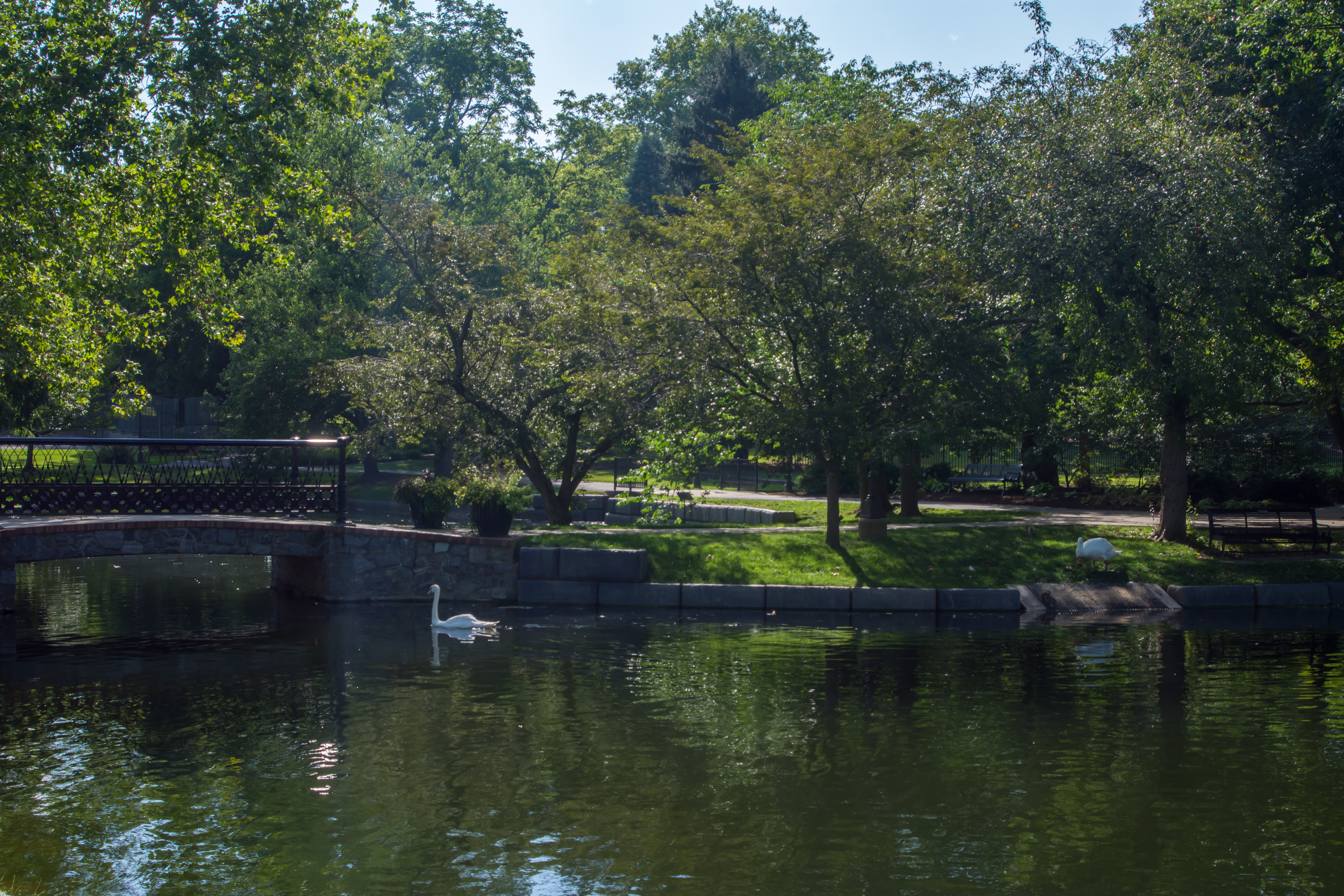
Swans at the Millersville University pond

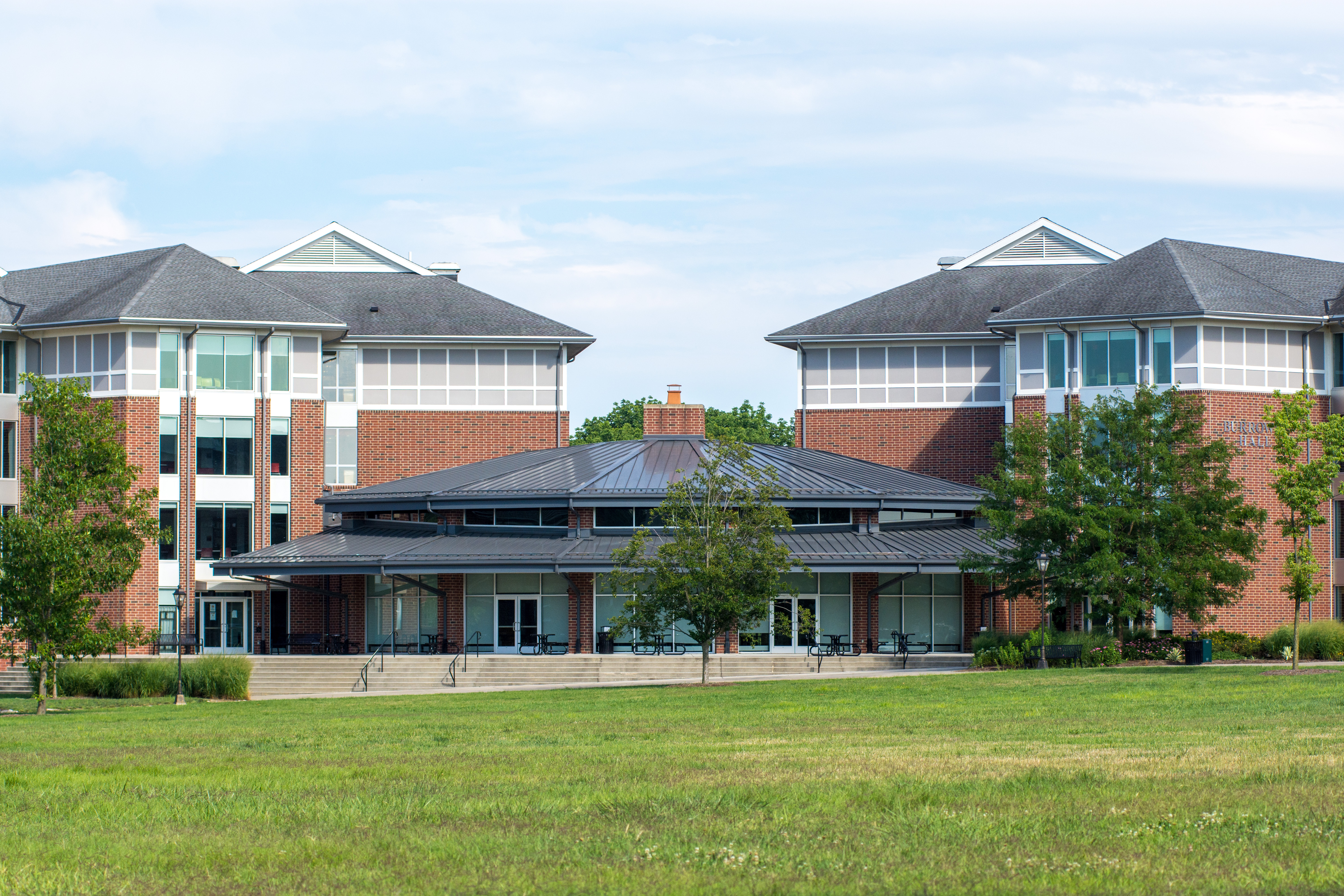
The South Village Suites Collection of Dormitories

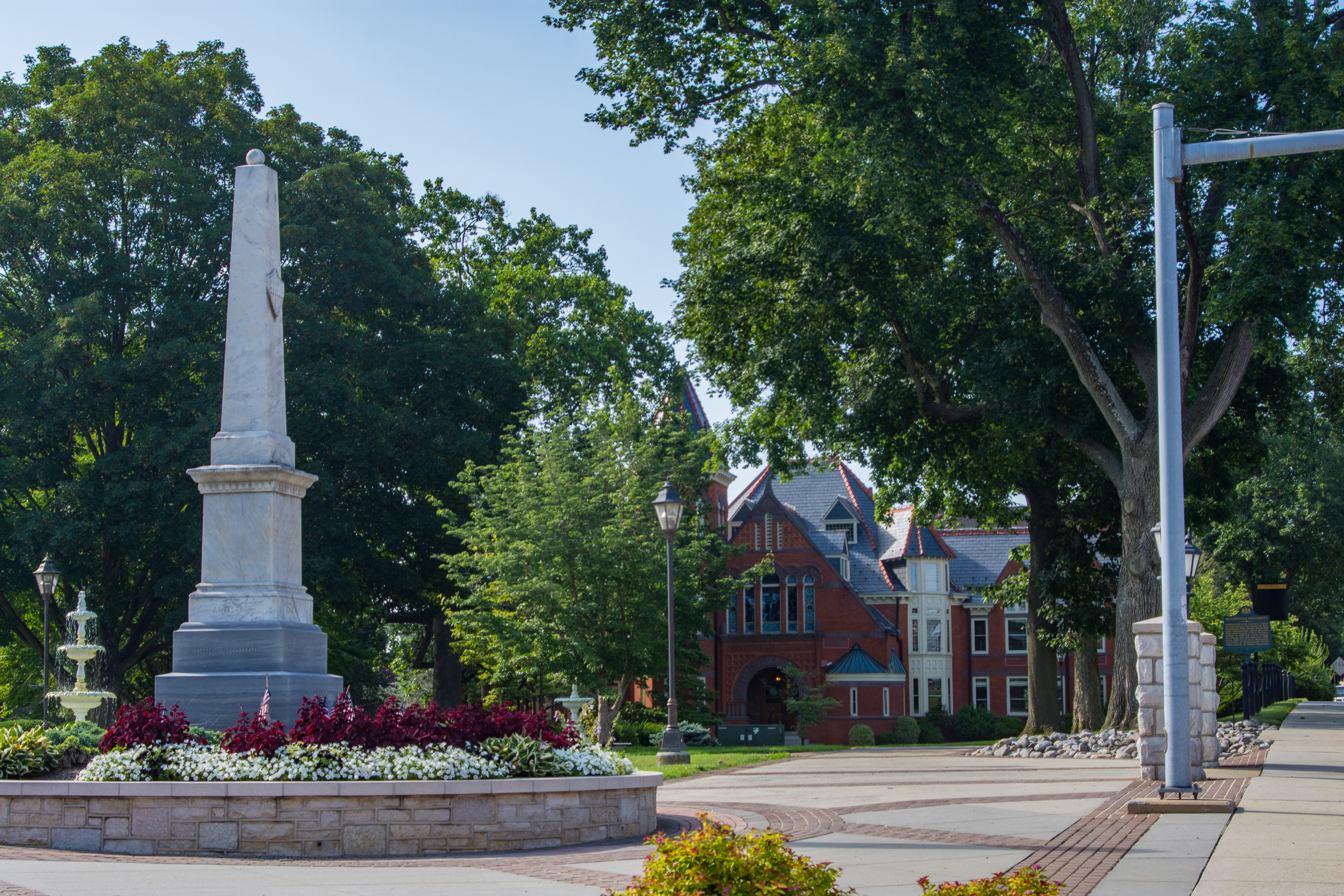
The Civil War Memorial in front of Biemesderfer

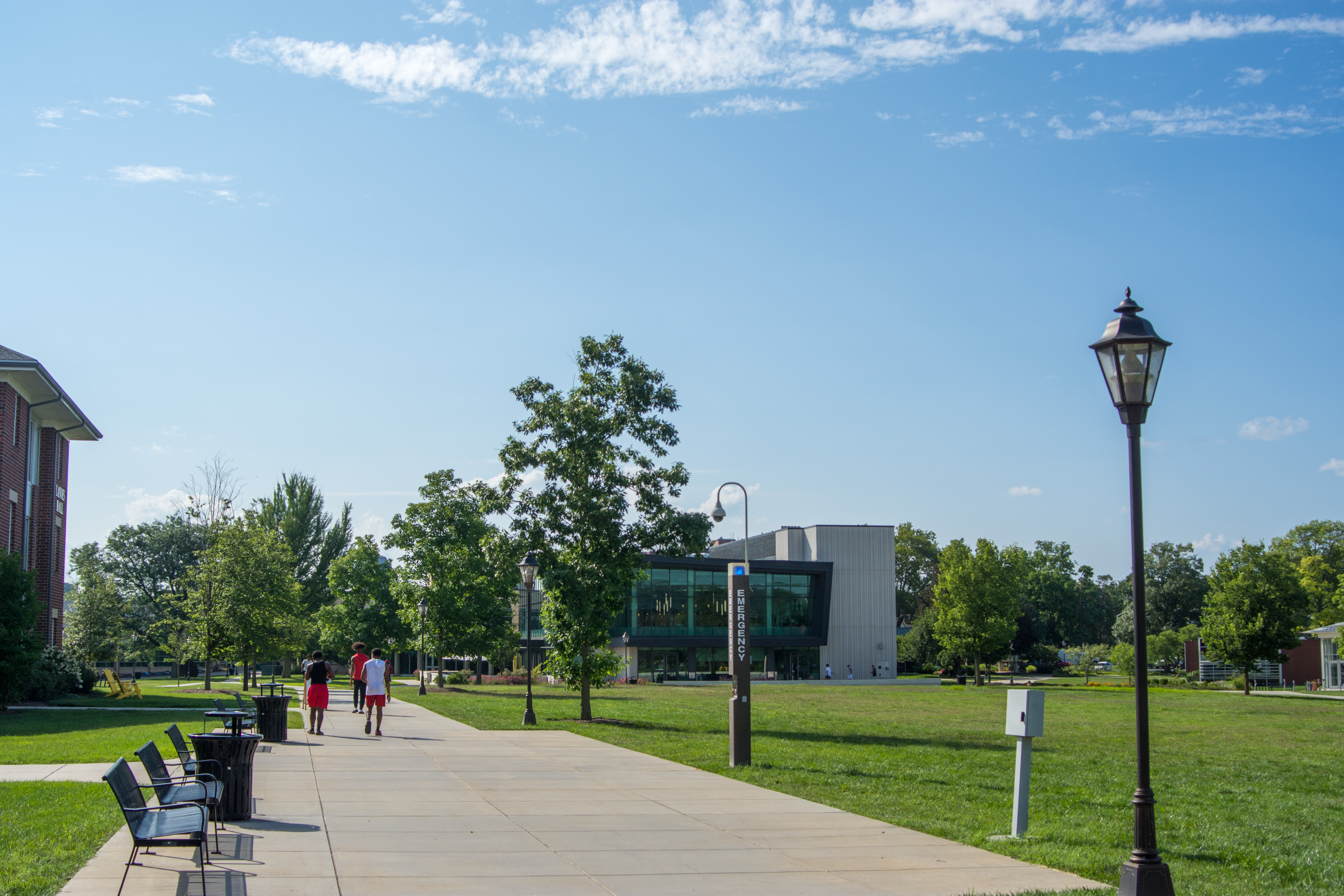
Gordinier Hall as viewed from Millersville's quad
