= Biemesderfer Executive Center =

Bemesderfer Executive Center or the Old Library, is an 1894 Romanesque Revival building on the campus of Millersville University. Built to replace the over-crowded library in Old Main, Bemesderfer Executive served many roles over the years and now serves as the Office of the President and Provost. With the opening of Ganser Hall in 1967, the "old" library was used as the temporary union building (the RAT) before being renovated and rededicated as Biemesderfer Executive Center. It was named for President D. Luke Biemesderfer (1943-1965) and his wife, Elva, both 1917 graduates of the normal school. It houses the offices of the top administration on campus as well as the H. Edgar Sherts Board Room, named for an 1896 graduate and prominent member of the Board of Trustees (1910-1936).

== History ==
=== 1891-1910 ===
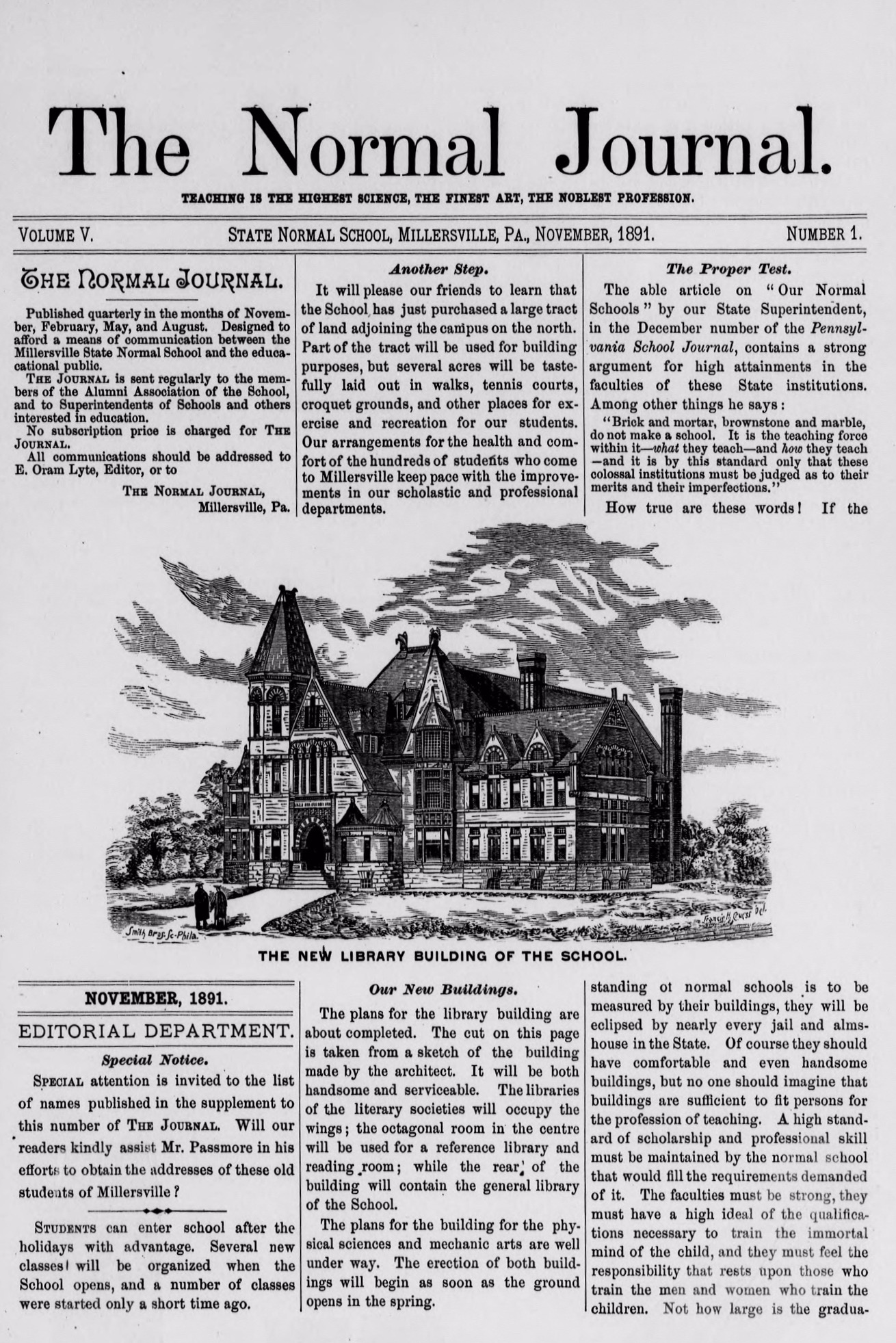
Millersville Normal Journal 1891 Vol V, No 1

In 1889, the administration of the Normal School recognized the need for a larger library. After touring several college libraries in the area, such as Lehigh University, Lafayette College Taylor College at Bryn Mawr and Dickinson College, the Board of Trustees Subcommittee, including Principal E.O. Lyte and Senator Amos H. Mylin, decided a layout like Dickinson's was ideal for Millersville because it could also house the two Literary Societies.

Plans for the new building were published in the November 1891 Normal Journal, where it was said by the Principal that "the libraries of the literary societies will occupy the wings; the octagonal room in the center will be used for a reference library and reading room, while the rear of the building will contain the general library of the school."

The site where the building was constructed was the Smith property, then an abandoned brick yard, which was purchased by the Normal School for $2,500 in 1891. The Executive Committee of the Board of Trustees designated $27,500 for the construction of the library in 1891 with the contract awarded to Lancastrian D.H. Rapp, who submitted the lowest bid in a blind auction.

Completed in 1894, the Biemesderfer Executive Center, also known as the Old Library, is the centerpiece of Millersville University's campus. With an interior finished in hard oak with quarter-sawed Georgia pine flooring, the building's dedication was part of a celebration marking the Normal School's 40th anniversary.

In 1899, the class of 1879 celebrated its twentieth anniversary by installing the sundial which is attached to the main tower of the library.

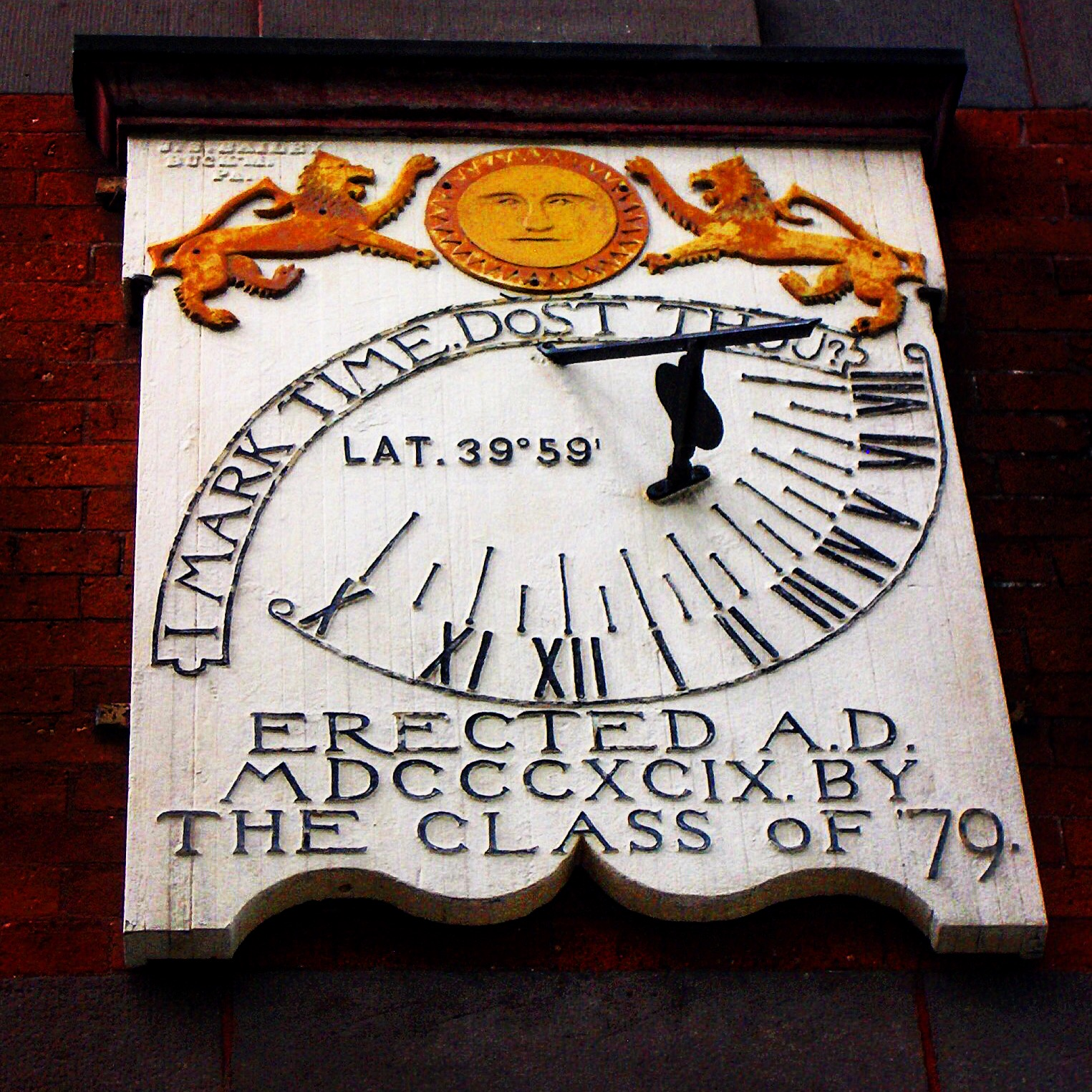
This sundial, built and installed in 1899, was a 20th anniversary gift from the class of 1879.

=== 1911-1967 ===
In 1911, the class of 1909 presented the first major change to the library - stained glass windows titled "Climb Though the Rocks be Rugged". The $600 windows were dedicated to the beloved Dr. Andrew R. Byerly.

This building served the campus community without electricity until 1922. Miss Ganser, librarian between 1911 and 1952, noted that there were no screens on the windows so, in the summer, one "just batted the bees away." In the mid 1940s, the first faculty bathroom was added to the basement of the building and in 1952 the first book elevator was added.

By the early 1950s, the building became so crowded that parts of the college's collections were moved to Old Main for annex storage and by 1961 the old Chapel of Old Main was also used.

The Bookwalk was an event that took place on two separate days in 1967. According to the September 20th edition of the Snapper from that year, "Approximately 90,000 books [were] expected to be moved from the Old Library to Ganser."

== Stained glass ==
In the March 19th meeting minutes from the Council of Trustees, 1894, the Council, "examined designs for stained glass windows and agreed to leave the decision in the hands of Dr. Lyte," on which windows to choose. On May 5, 1894, Dr. Lyte reported that Mr. Goodwin, of Philadelphia, "has the most suitable glass for library buildings," and so was chosen to create the windows for the library. The top-half of the central window is perfectly symmetrical and consists of an octet of tear-shaped windows set into a large circle of dark wood with a carved center.

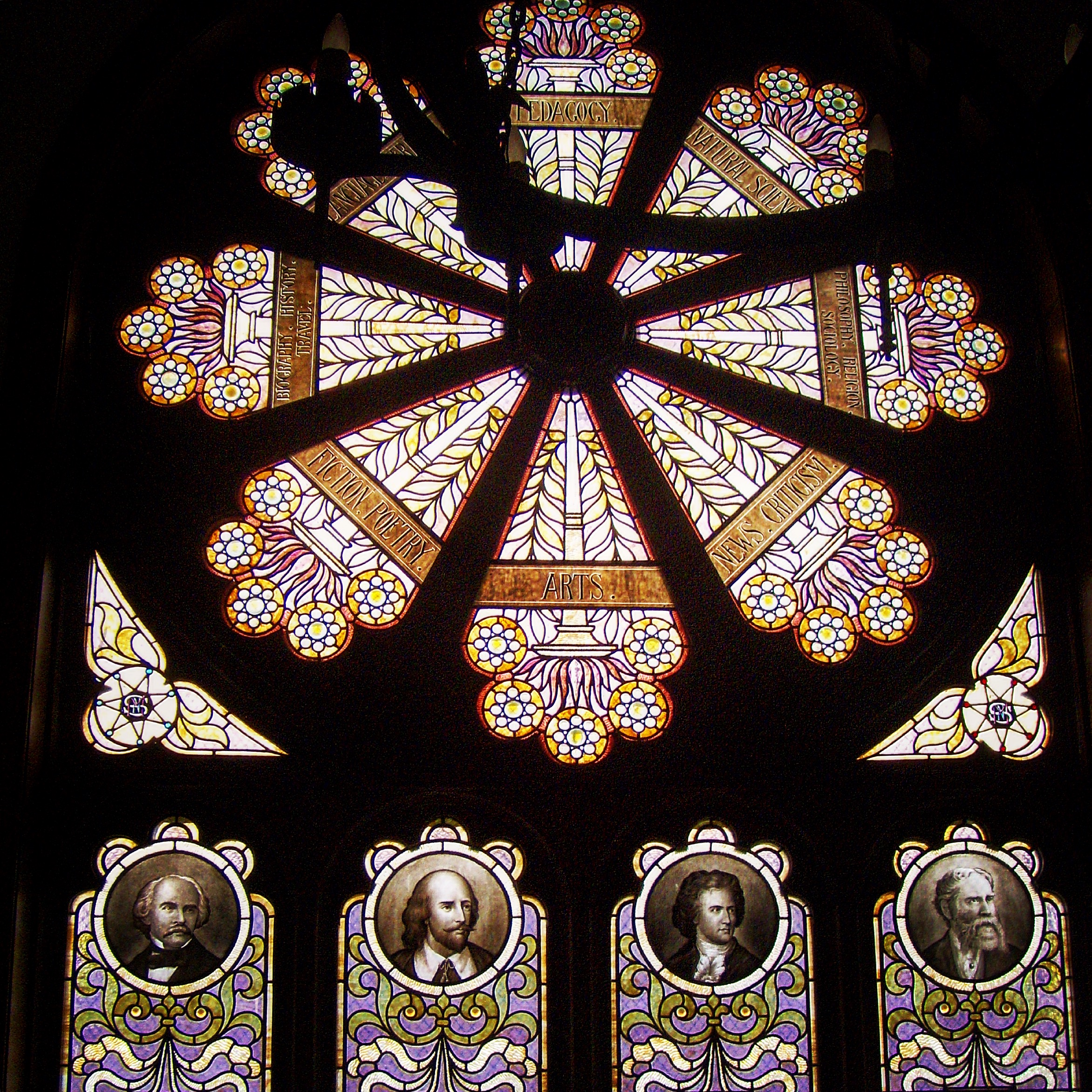
The central window of Biemesderfer Executive from the interior

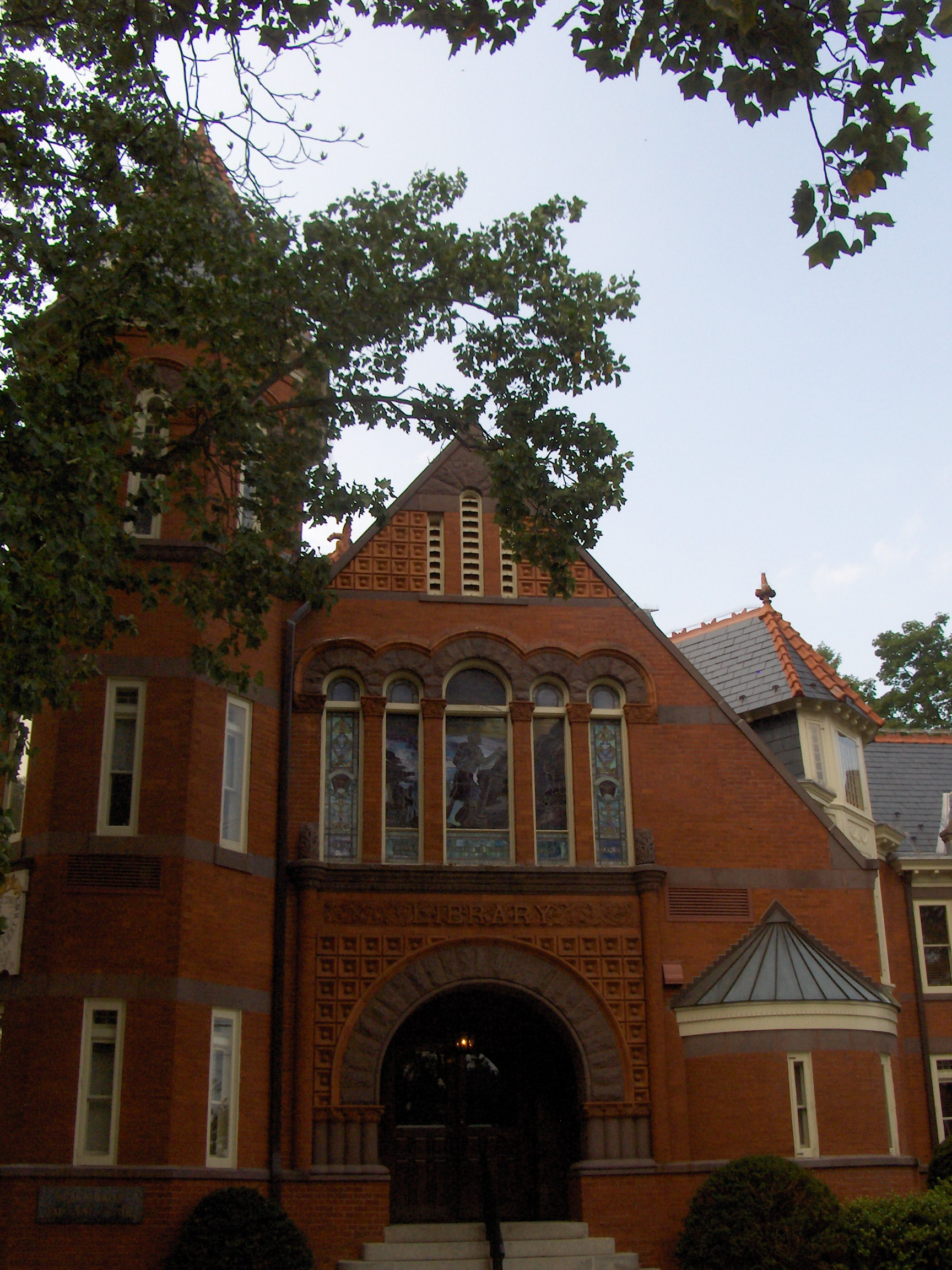
Biemesderfer main entrance

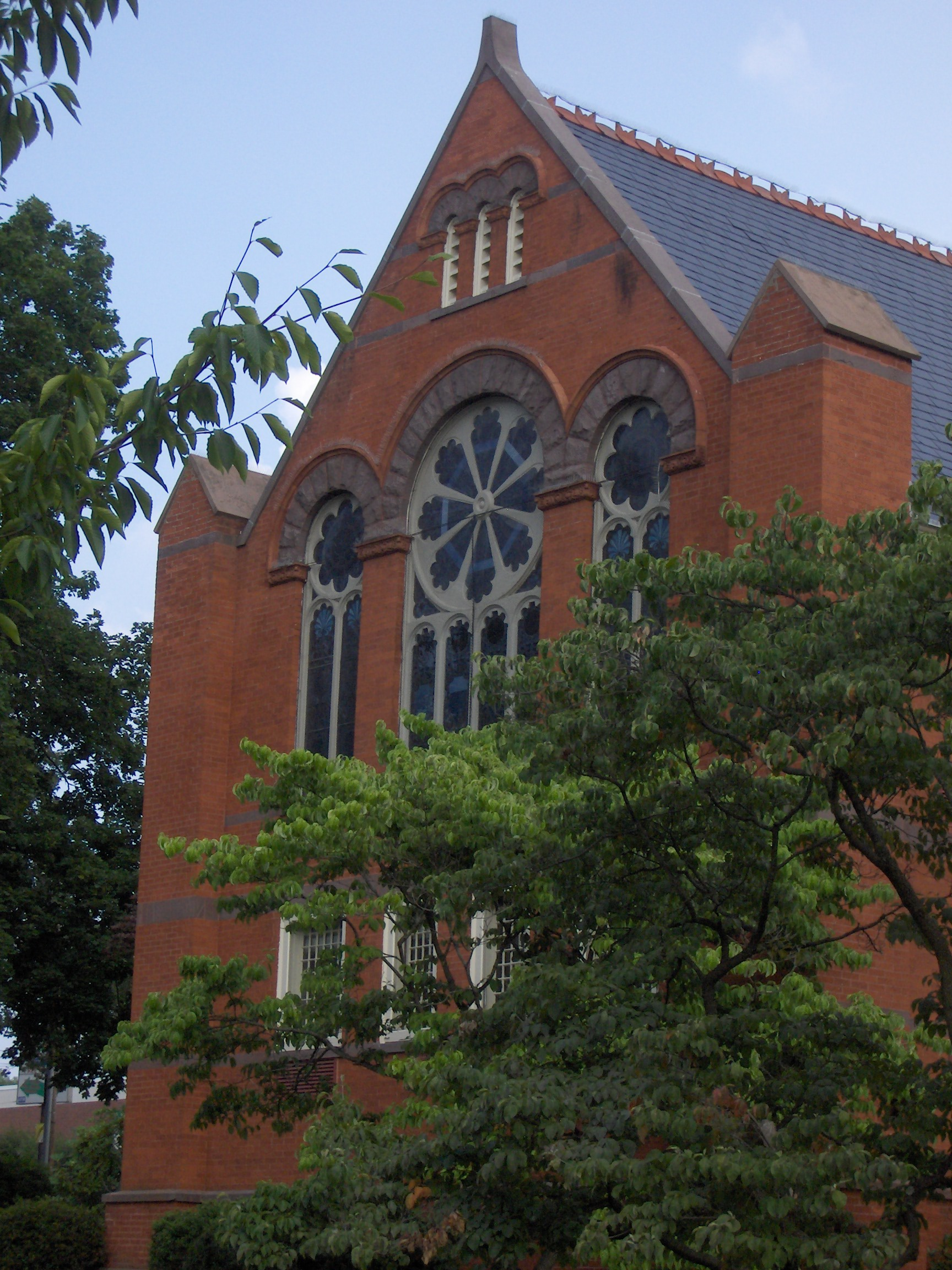
The oculus of Biemesderfer

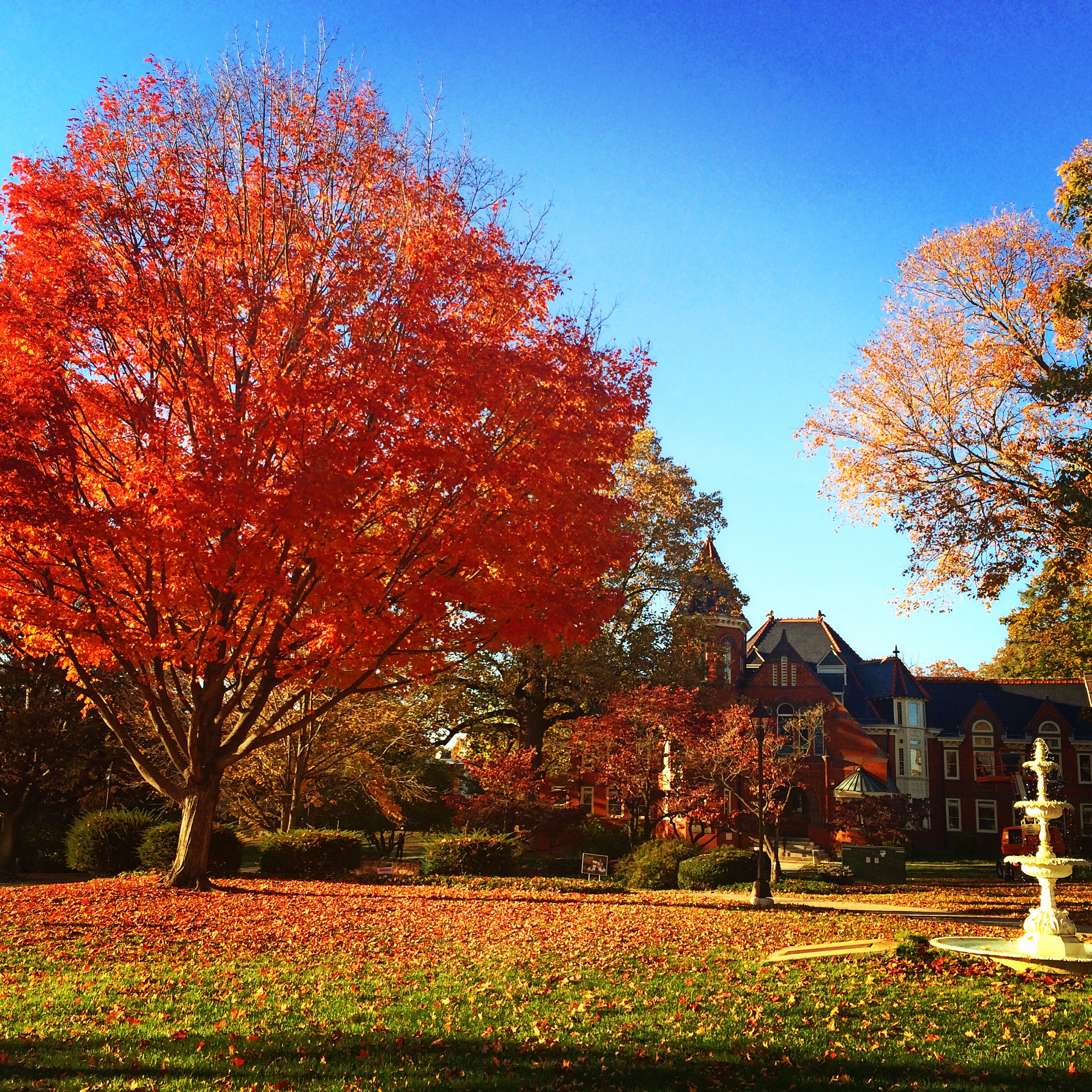
Biemesderfer Executive Center at Millersville University, behind autumn trees of gold

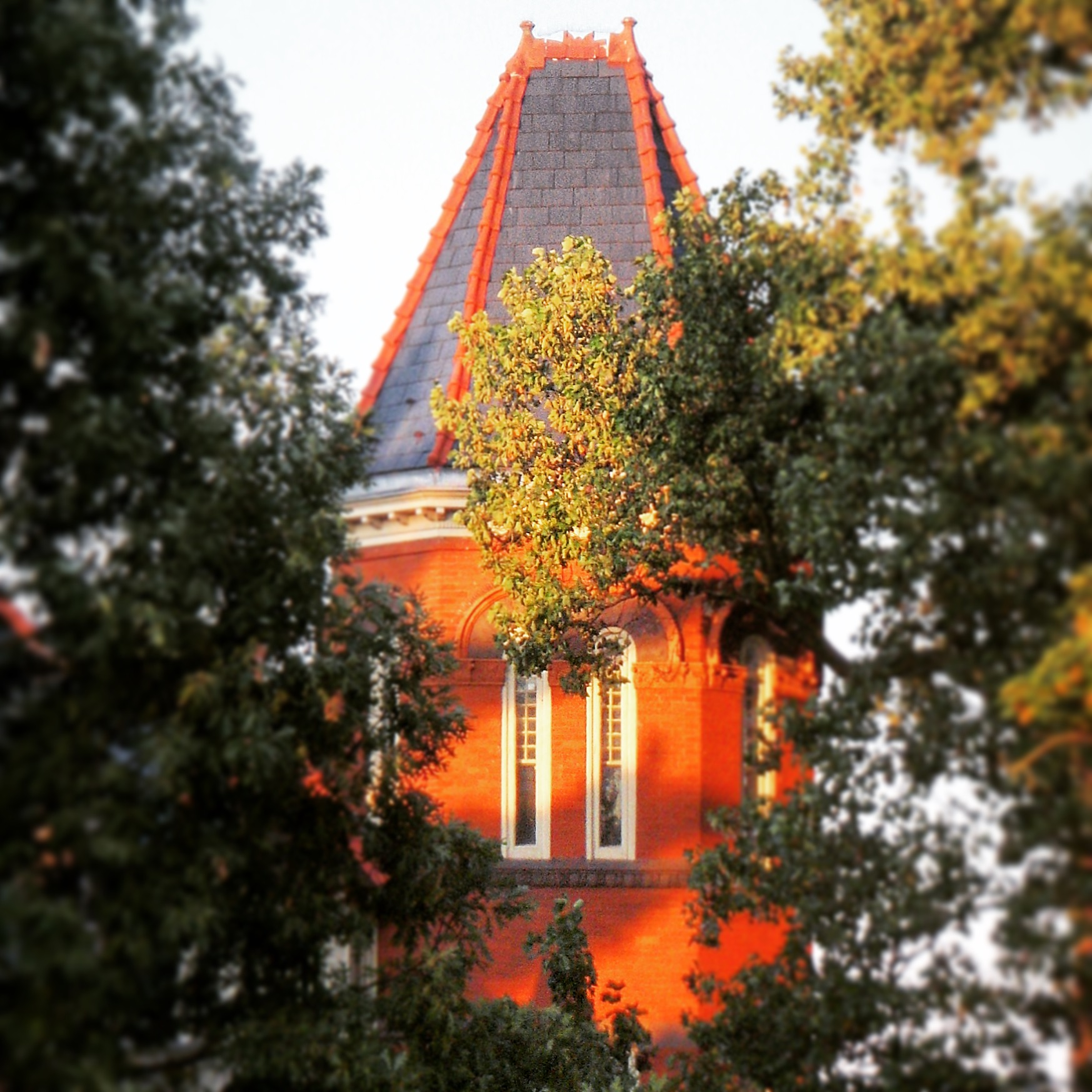
Main Tower of Biemesderfer Executive at Millersville University

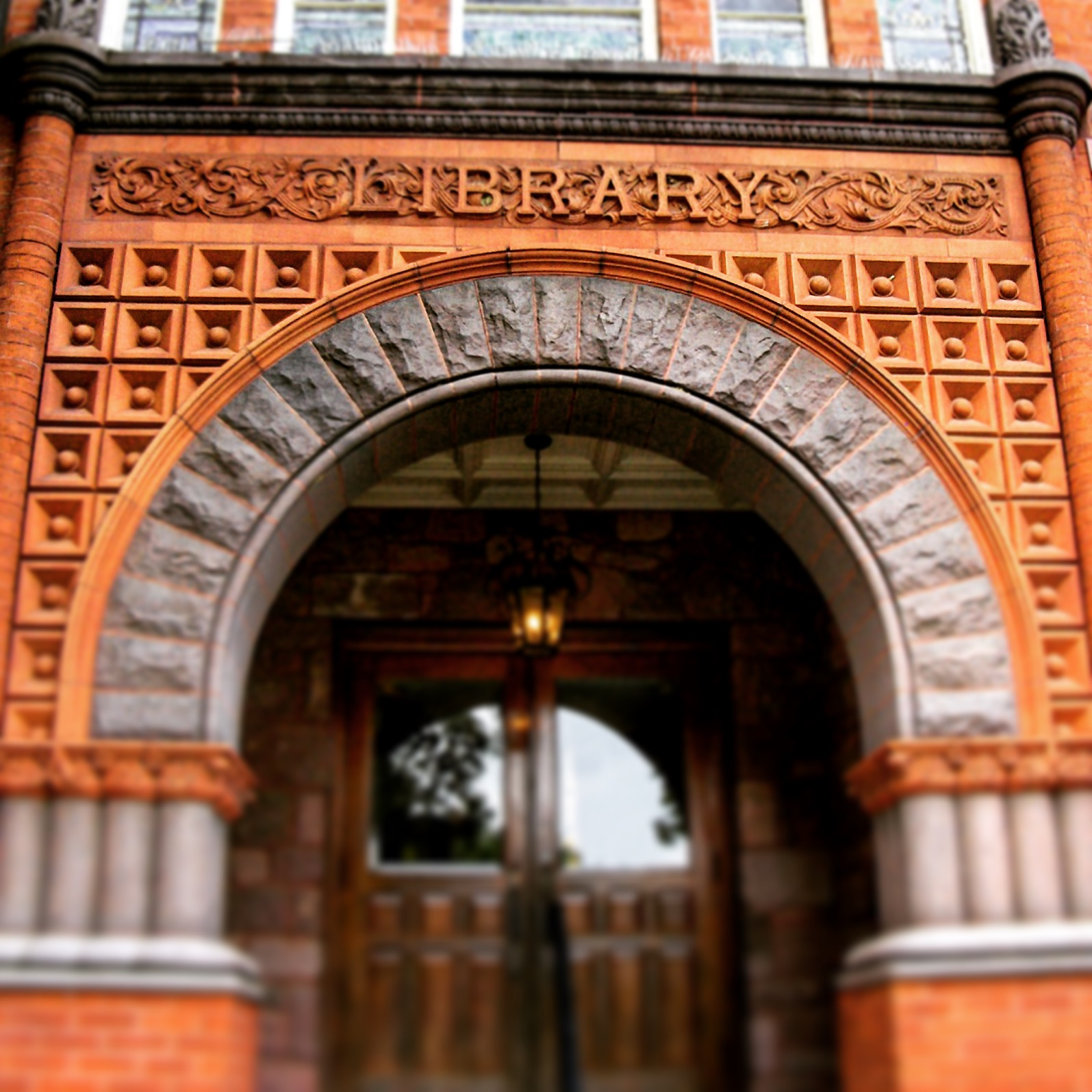
Biemesderfer Executive main entrance at Millersville University
