= Row, Row, Row Your Boat =

Nursery rhyme

Nursery rhyme
- Published: 1852; 174 years ago
- Genre: Children's music
- Songwriter: Eliphalet Oram Lyte

"Row, Row, Row Your Boat" is an English language nursery rhyme and a popular children's song, of American origin, often sung in a round. It has a Roud Folk Song Index number of 19236.

== Lyrics ==
The most common modern version is often sung as a round for up to four voice parts. A possible arrangement for SATB is as follows:

Soprano	Alto	Tenor	Bass
Row, row, row your boat,			
Gently down the stream.	Row, row, row your boat,		
Merrily, merrily, merrily, merrily,	Gently down the stream.	Row, row, row your boat,	
Life is but a dream.	Merrily, merrily, merrily, merrily,	Gently down the stream.	Row, row, row your boat,
	Life is but a dream.	Merrily, merrily, merrily, merrily,	Gently down the stream.
		Life is but a dream.	Merrily, merrily, merrily, merrily,
			Life is but a dream.

The text above is often sung multiple times in succession to allow for the different voices to interweave with each other, forming four-part harmony.

== Origins ==
The earliest printing of the song is from 1852, when the lyrics were published with similar lyrics to those used today, but with a very different tune. It was reprinted again two years later with the same lyrics and another tune. The modern tune was first recorded with the lyrics in 1881, mentioning Eliphalet Oram Lyte in The Franklin Square Song Collection but not making it clear whether he was the composer or adapter.

== Legacy and alternative versions ==
The nursery rhyme is well known, appearing in several films and TV programmes, including Blackadder Goes Forth, Star Trek V: The Final Frontier, Turbo: A Power Rangers Movie, Eternal Sunshine of the Spotless Mind, The Trumpet of the Swan, SpongeBob SquarePants, Manos: The Hands of Fate, Dirty Harry, and Dante's Peak.

Bing Crosby included the song in a medley on his 1961 album 101 Gang Songs. Crosby also used the song as part of a round with his family, as captured on the 1976 album Bing Crosby Live at the London Palladium. Aimee Mann included a brief interpolation in her 1996 song "Choice in the Matter".

People often add additional verses, a form of children's street culture, with the intent of either extending the song or (especially in the case of more irreverent versions) to make it funny, parody it, or substitute another sensibility for the perceived innocent one of the original. Don Music, a Muppet character in Sesame Street, changed the lyrics to feature a car instead of a boat.
