= The Ware Center of Millersville University =

The Ware Center - Millersville University
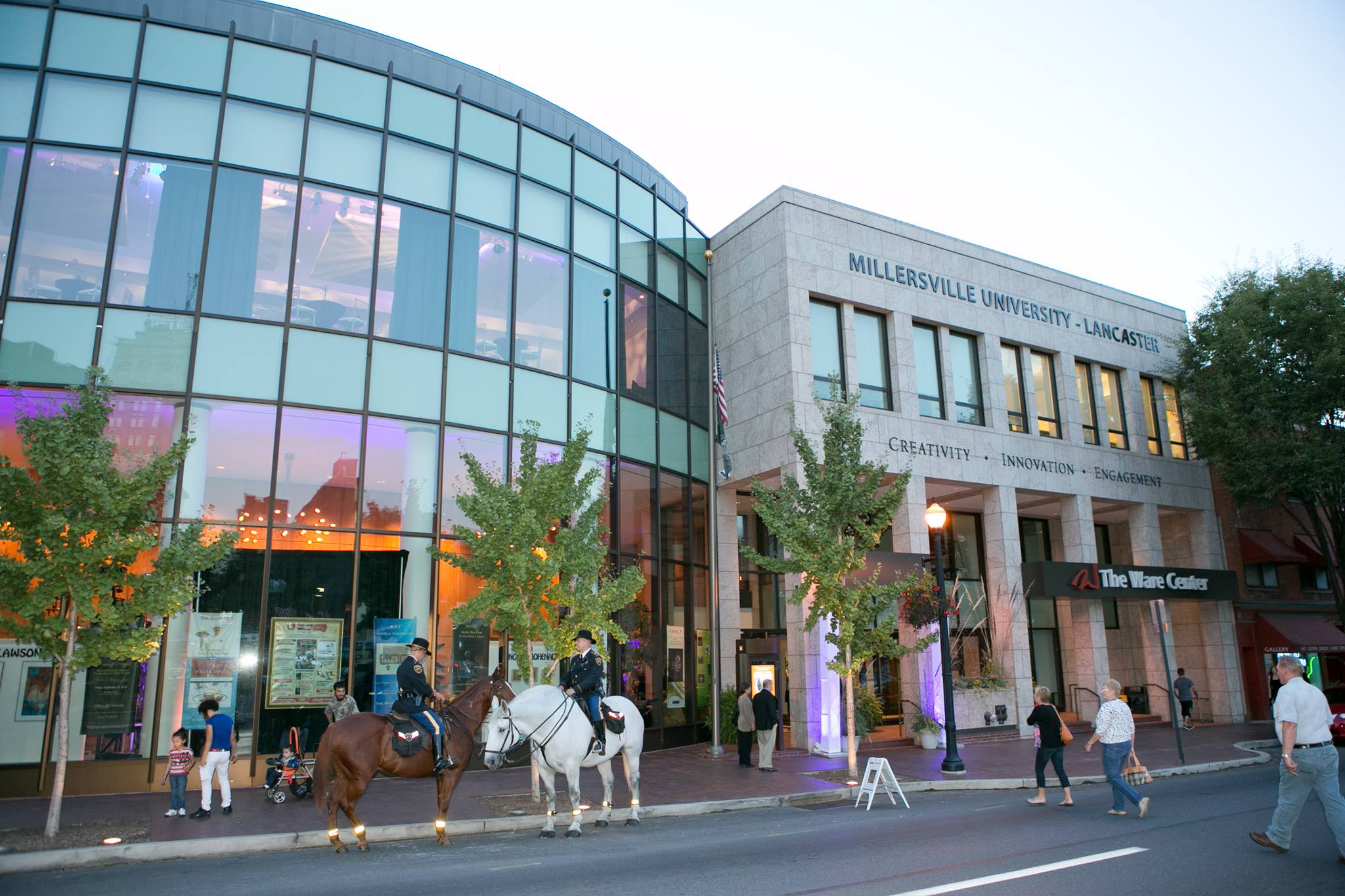
- Front of The Ware Center in Lancaster, PA.
- Interactive map of The Ware Center - Millersville University
- Former names: Pennsylvania Academy of Music (2008–2010)
- Address: 42 N. Prince Street; Lancaster, PA 17603
- Location: Lancaster, PA
- Operator: Millersville University
- Capacity: Steinman Hall: 350; Lyet Lobby: 300; Atrium: 300; Owen Salon: 120; Binns Room: 100
- Type: Performing arts center

Construction
- Groundbreaking: May 20, 2006
- Opened: June 11, 2008
- Architect: Philip Johnson

Website
- www.artsmu.com

The Ware Center for the Arts is a performing arts center located in Lancaster, Pennsylvania. First opened in 2008, it has been a satellite campus of Millersville University since 2010. The Ware Center is a venue for Millersville University's Department of Visual & Performing Arts.

== History ==
Originally designed by architect Philip Johnson and noted acoustician Cyril M. Harris, the $32 million building opened in 2008 as the home of the now defunct Pennsylvania Academy of Music. The building became available due to the bankruptcy of the PA Academy of Music at the same time Millersville University was planning an extensive renovation of its main campus arts center. Millersville University began leasing the building in June 2010, shortly after the PA Academy of Music left the building. The Pennsylvania Department of General Services then bought the building from Union Community Bank on Millersville's behalf for $10.9 million in March 2011. $14.5 million was originally allocated by the state of Pennsylvania for purchasing the 63,000-square-foot building on Millersville's behalf, as well as equipping, furnishing and renovating it.

At that point, the building was known as “Millersville University-Lancaster”, as it wasn't until September 12, 2011, that it was renamed “The Ware Center” in honor of philanthropists Paul W. and Judy S. Ware at a dedication ceremony in the building's main theater, Steinman Hall.

In 2012, The Ware Center underwent a $2.4 million renovation to better adapt it to Millersville University's needs; among the renovations was the creation of larger classroom space and lighting and acoustic improvements to Steinman Hall.

== Concerts and Events ==
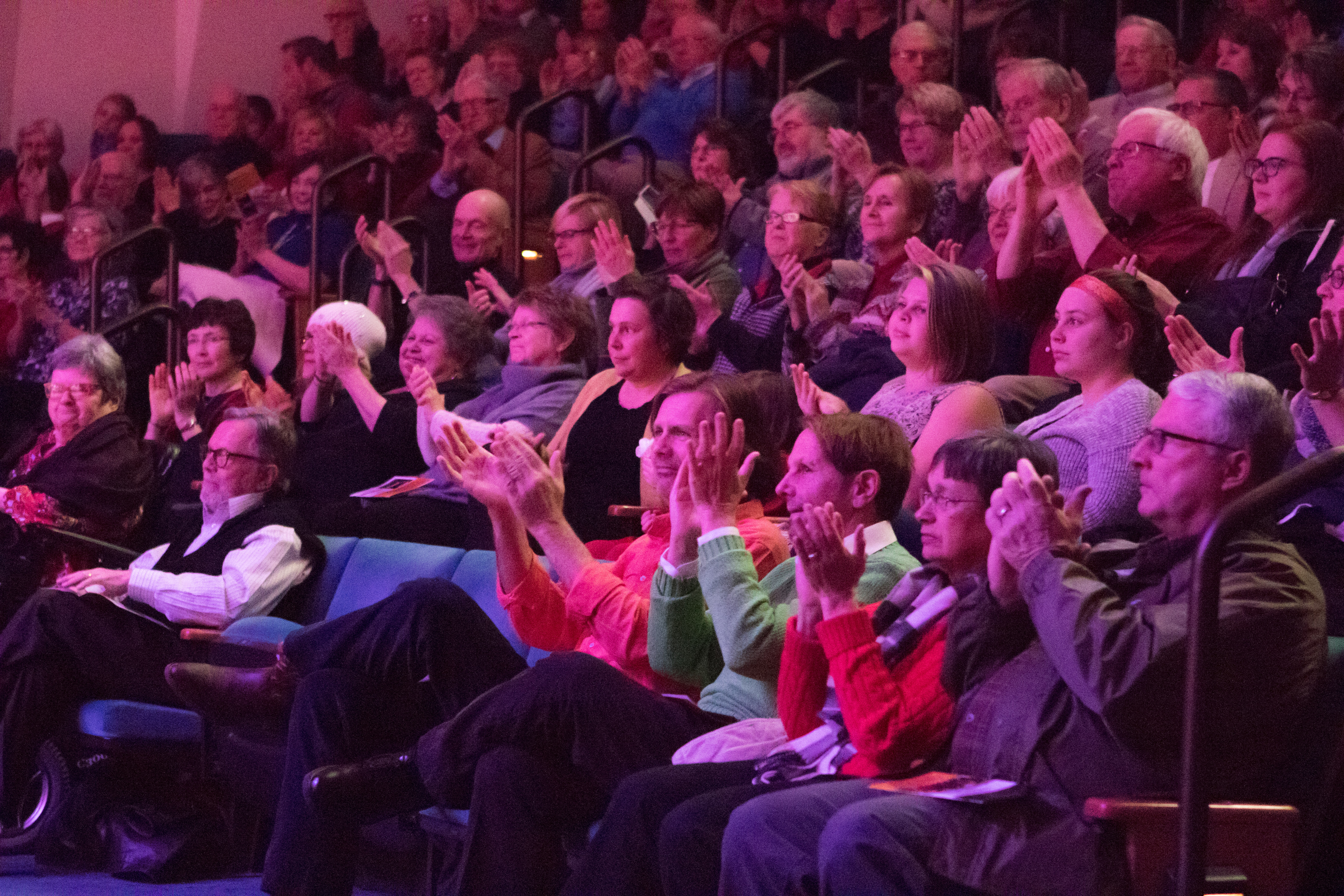
A crowd watches a performance at Steinman Hall inside The Ware Center of Millersville University in downtown Lancaster, PA.

The building plays host to various musical, theatrical, dance, poetry, lecture, and other artistic events throughout the year, including on Lancaster city's First Fridays. It is also rented out as a private event venue and banquet hall for meetings, conferences, and weddings.

Lancaster's local newspaper LNP has referred to The Ware Center as “the busiest exhibit, performance, classroom and event space in Lancaster County”.

=== Notable Performers at The Ware Center ===
- Pennsylvania Ballet Company
- Lancaster Symphony Orchestra
- Antoine Tamestit
- Patti LuPone
- Hilary Hahn
- Narek Hakhnazaryan

== Venue Spaces ==
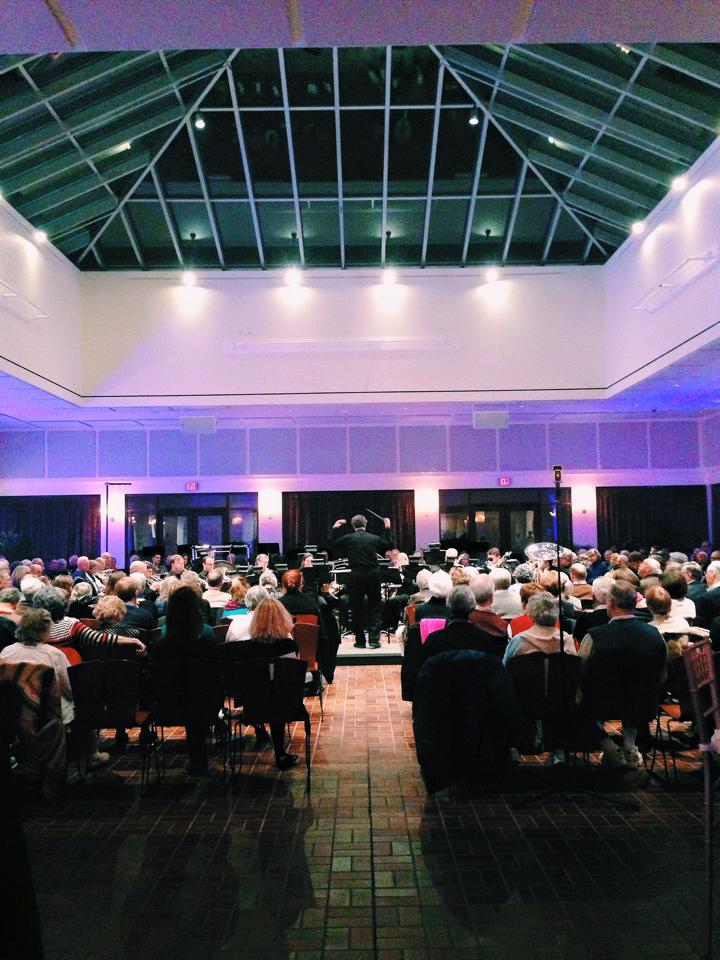
Atrium at The Ware Center

The Ware Center features several state-of-the-art venues for live theater and concerts, as well as conferences, meetings, and art exhibits.

- Steinman Hall - a 350-seat concert hall, with acoustics designed by Cyril M. Harris, an award-winning acoustician who designed over 100 concert halls around the world, including the Lincoln Center and the Kennedy Center
- Lyet Lobby - 3,000 square foot reception hall featuring floor to ceiling windows
- Atrium - Banquet hall with a glass pyramid ceiling
- Owen Salon - A third-floor room that overlooks the Lancaster skyline
- Binns Room - Lecture hall used by Millersville University
- Regitz Art Gallery - This gallery is open the first Friday of every month featuring a new exhibit by a local artist

== Lancaster Campus of Millersville University ==
Since 2010, The Ware Center has been used as a Lancaster City campus of Millersville University. With over 20 classrooms, The Ware Center hosts classes for nearly 1,000 Millersville University students during Fall and Spring semesters.

== Community Involvement ==
Due to its close proximity to Gallery Row in downtown Lancaster, The Ware Center has taken a lead in promoting arts within the city. The Community Arts Advisory Council gathers together business leaders and benefactors of the arts to promote events and seek community partnerships. The Arts Smarts summer camp provides children with the opportunity to explore building through visual and performing arts. The Regitz Art Gallery features a local artist exhibition the first Friday evening of the month during Lancaster's First Friday event.

In 2014, The Ware Center received the Building the Community Award from Central Penn Business Journal.
