= Benjamin Franklin Shaub =

American educator and businessman (born 1841)

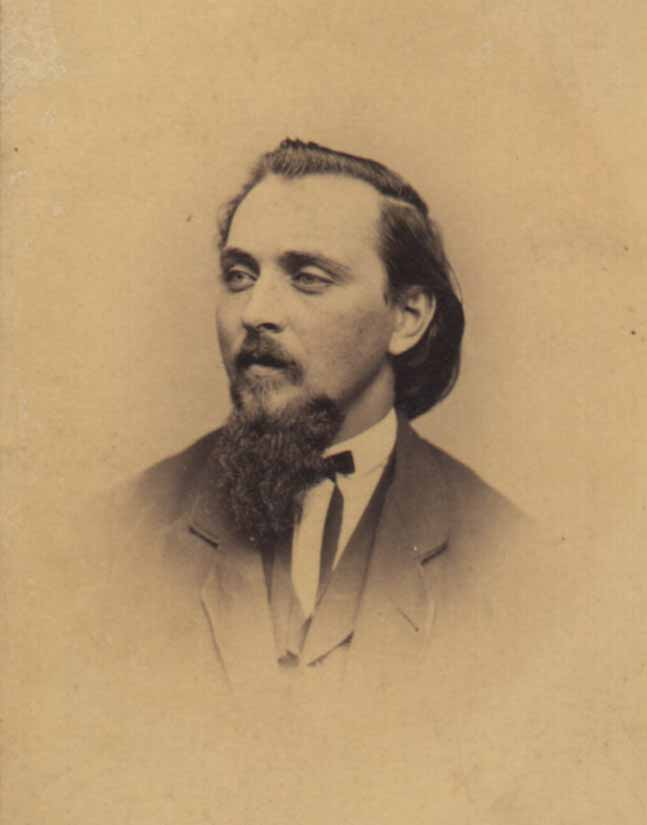
Benjamin Franklin Shaub

Benjamin Franklin Shaub (April 25, 1841 – August 31, 1913) was an American educator and businessman in Pennsylvania.

He was born April 25, 1841, in Strasburg Township, Lancaster County, Pennsylvania, son of Benjamin and Susannah (Wade) Shaub, natives of Lancaster County. Benjamin Shaub, the father, was a farmer in Strasburg Township, where he was a well-known and influential man. His death occurred in 1896, when he was eighty years of age, and his wife died in 1899, aged eighty-four years, both dying at Strasburg; they were buried in the Old Mennonite cemetery. Five children were born to these parents: Benjamin Franklin, Amos, a shoe merchant of Lancaster, Pa.; John, a shoe merchant of Lancaster; Christian, a clothing merchant of Lancaster; and Mary, widow of David E. Mayer of Strasburg. The paternal grandfather was John Shaub, who married Elizabeth Gochenaur. He was a farmer of Providence Township, and a man of prominence and influence in the community. The first of the Shaub family to settle in this country was a native of Switzerland.

During his boyhood days, Shaub worked on his father's farm, attending school during the winter seasons. At the age of eighteen, so advanced was he in his studies, he began teaching and continued as an instructor in the public schools for five years. His first school was at Fairview, in Strasburg Township, and at the expiration of five years, although only twenty-three, he was offered the position of principal of the high school in Bellefonte, Centre County, Pennsylvania, which he retained for one year. He then entered the Millersville Normal School, from which he graduated with high honors in the scientific course in 1869. In that year, he was elected Professor of Physics and German at Millersville Normal School and remained in this position until 1871, when he resigned to study law under the preceptorship of Hon. John B. Livingston, Lancaster, Pennsylvania.

In 1872, Shaub was elected county superintendent, a position he held for eleven and a half years. In 1883, he was elected principal of the Millersville Normal School and remained in that position for four years. Many important improvements were made in the school under his principalship, and the tone of the school was kept at a high standard. A fine reading room was established, and the entire institution was supplied with water throughout, thus furnishing a basis for many subsequent improvements.

In 1887 he resigned the principal-ship, and removed to Lancaster and started the Lancaster Carpet Company, Inc., dealers in carpets, rugs, mattings, etc., with John V. Vondersmith, these two partners continuing alone until 1891, when the concern was incorporated, with Shaub as treasurer, and Vondersmith as superintendent. The extensive business connections built up by this organization have placed it among the leading commercial houses of Lancaster.

In 1880 he was president of the Pennsylvania State Teachers' Association. In 1875 Franklin and Marshall College conferred upon Shaub the degree of A. M.; and in 1885 Lafayette College conferred upon him the degree of Ph. D.

Shaub married Alwilda Book, who was born in Strasburg, Pennsylvania, daughter of Michael and Sarah (Spiehlman) Book, of Lancaster County, Pa., where the father was a farmer. These parents were of Swiss and German descent. One child was born to Mr. and Mrs. Shaub, Miriam, a graduate of the Lancaster High School, and taught Latin in Prof. Moore's school for young ladies, Cotta College, Lancaster. The family were members of the Methodist Episcopal Church, in which organization Shaub was Sunday-school superintendent for five years, and a member of its official board. In politics, was a Republican.
