= List of operas performed at the Santa Fe Opera =

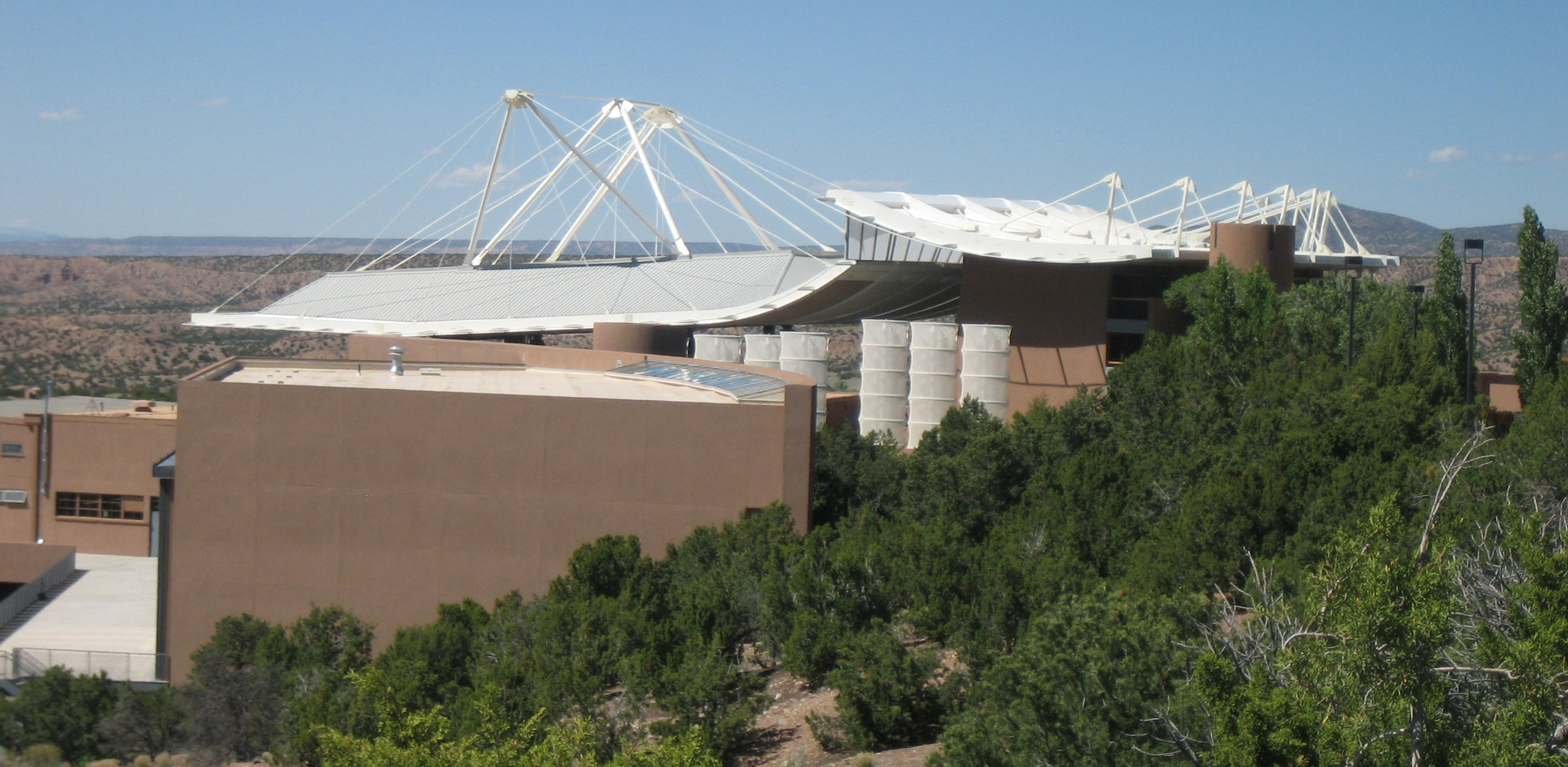
Santa Fe Opera's Crosby Theatre, rebuilt in 1998 (seen from the south)

Below is a complete list of the operas performed by The Santa Fe Opera (Santa Fe, New Mexico) since its inception in 1957. Only complete operas presented on stage with orchestra are listed. However, over the years, the company has also highlighted programs of opera scenes and one-act operas which showcase programs presented by the Apprentice Singers and Apprentice Technicians.

Nearly all the performances listed took place in the three main theatres: the original theatre (1957–67, with the exception of those which took place in the Sweeney Opera House after the July 1967 fire), the rebuilt theatre (1968–1997), and the present Crosby Theatre (since 1998).

To date, The Santa Fe Opera has been led by the following General Directors:
1957–2000: John Crosby; 2000–2008: Richard Gaddes; 2008–2018: Charles MacKay; 2018–present: Robert Meya

== List ==
=== The first theatre, 1957 to 1967 ===
Year	Opera	Composer	Lang.	Year	Conductor	Stage director	Designers	Notable singers
1957	Madame Butterfly	Giacomo Puccini	Italian	1904	John Crosby	Bill Butler	Patton Campbell, Patton Campbell	Regina Sarfaty, William McGrath, Loren Driscoll, Mildred Allen, Robert Rue
1957	Ariadne auf Naxos	Richard Strauss	German	1916	Vernon Hammond	Robert Akert	Patton Campbell, Patton Campbell	Shirlee Emmons, Joan Carroll, Marguerite Willauer
1957	Così fan tutte	Wolfgang Amadeus Mozart	Italian	1790	Vernon Hammond	Robert Ackart	Patton Campbell, Patton Campbell	Shirlee Emmons, Mary McMurray, Joan Moynagh, Loren Driscoll, Peter Binder
1957	The Barber of Seville	Gioachino Rossini	Italian	1816	Robert Baustian	Bill Butler	Patton Cambell, Patton Campbell	Peter Binder, Mary McMurray, Spelios Constantine, Regina Sarfaty
1957	The Tower	Marvin David Levy	English	1957	Robert Baustian	Marvin David Levy	Patton Campbell	Robert Rue, William McGrath, Regina Sarfaty, Carol Bergey
1957	La Serva Padrona	Giovanni Battista Pergolesi	Italian	1733	Erich Kunzel	Robert Ackart	Patton Campbell, Patton Campbell	Andrew Földi, Joan Moynagh, Wayne Whitman
1957	The Rake's Progress	Igor Stravinsky	English	1951	Robert Craft	Bliss Hebert	Patton Campbell, Patton Campbell, Patton Campbell	Marguerite Willauer, Loren Driscoll, Spelios Constantine, Robert Rue
1958	La bohème	Giacomo Puccini	Italian	1859	John Crosby	Richard Baldridge	Patton Campbell, Patton Campbell	Maria Ferriero, Judith Raskin, Davis Cunningham, Robert Rue
1958	Così fan tutte	Wolfgang Amadeus Mozart	Italian	1790	Robert Baustian	Robert Ackart	Patton Campbell, Patton Campbell	Saramae Endich; Mildred Allen; Loren Driscoll; Peter Binder; Mary McMurray; Andrew Földi
1958	Falstaff	Giuseppe Verdi	Italian	1893	Robert Baustian	Bliss Hebert	Patton Campbell, Patton Cambell	Robert Rue; Rolf Sander; Regina Sarfaty; Nico Castel; Andrew Földi
1958	Wuthering Heights	Carlisle Floyd	Italian	1958	John Crosby	Irving Guttman	Patton Campbell, Patton Campbell	Phyllis Curtin; Robert Treny; Regina Sarfaty
1958	Cinderella	Jules Massenet	French	1899	Robert Baustian	Richard Baldridge	Patton Campbell, Patton Campbell	Mary McMurray; John Macurdy; George Gibson; Andrew Földi
1958	Capriccio	Richard Strauss	German	1942	John Crosby	Robert Ackart	Patton Campbell, Patton Campbell	Loren Driscoll; Robert Rue; Maria Ferriero
1959	Die Fledermaus	Johann Strauss II	German	1874	John Crosby	George Mully	Patton Campbell, Patton Campbell	Nico Castel / Charles Anthony, Mildred Allen / Reri Grist, Saramae Endich, Peter Binder, Regina Sarfaty
1959	Anna Bolena	Gaetano Donizetti	Italian	1830	Robert Craft	Robert Ackart	Patton Campbell; Patton Campbell	Maria Ferriero, Regina Sarfaty, Andrew Földi
1959	Madame Butterfly	Giacomo Puccini	Italian	1904	John Crosby	George Mully	Patton Campbell; Patton Campbell	Mildred Allen, Charles Anthony / Frank Porretta, Regina Sarfaty / Joan Caplan, Robert Rue, Robert Trehy
1959	The Abduction from the Seraglio	Wolfgang Amadeus Mozart	Italian	1782	Robert Baustian	Bliss Hebert	Patton Campbell, Patton Campbell	Saramae Endich, Reri Grist, Andrew Földi
1959	The Barber of Seville	Gioachino Rossini	Italian	1816	Robert Baustian	Robert Ackart	Henry Heymann; Patton Campbell; Robert Benson	Charles Anthony / Rolf Sander, Robert Trehy, Peter Binder, Andrew Földi
1959	Regina	Marc Blitzstein	English	1949	Margaret Hillis	Bliss Hebert	Henry Heymann, Patton Campbell, Robert Benson	Maria di Gerlando, Richard Best, Joan Caplan, Oscar Hubbard, Robert Trehy, Regina Giddens, Regina Sarfaty
1960	The Gondoliers	Arthur Sullivan	English	1889	John Crosby	Martyn Green	Henry Heymann, Henry Heymann, Robert L. Benson	Martyn Green, David Bender, Robert Trehy, Elaine Bonazzi
1960	La traviata	Giuseppe Verdi	Italian	1853	Earl Wild	Bill Butler	Henry Heymann, Henry Heymann, Robert L. Benson	Maria di Gerlando, William Lewis, Peter Binder / Robert Trehy
1960	La cenerentola	Gioachino Rossini	Italian	1817	Robert Baustian	Bill Butler	Henry Heymann, Patton Campbell, Robert Benson	Helen Vanni, Andrew Földi, Loren Driscoll, Peter Binder
1960	Oedipus rex	Igor Stravinsky	English	1927	Igor Stravinsky	Hans Busch	Henry Heymann, Tanya Moiseiwitsch, Robert L. Benson	Paul Franke, Mary Mackenzie, Gimi Beni, Andrew Földi
1960	Gianni Schicchi	Giacomo Puccini	Italian	1918	Earl Wild	Hans Busch	Henry Heymann, Henry Heymann, Robert L. Benson	Jose Ferrer, Jeanette Scovotti, Maria di Gerlando
1960	The Rake's Progress	Igor Stravinsky	English	1951	Robert Craft	Bliss Hebert	Henry Heymann, Patton Campbell, Robert L. Benson	Gimi Beni, Mildred Allen, Loren Driscoll, John Reardon
1960	Tosca	Giacomo Puccini	Italian	1900	John Crosby	Bliss Hebert	Henry Heymann, Henry Heymann, Stephen H. Arnold	Franca Duval, William Lewis, John Reardon
1960	The Marriage of Figaro	Wolfgang Amadeus Mozart	Italian	1786	Robert Baustian	Hans Busch	Henry Heymann, Henry Heymann, Stephen H. Arnold	Andrew Földi, Donald Gramm, Mildred Allen, Helen Vanni
1961	Carmen	Georges Bizet	French	1874	Robert Craft	Bill Butler	Henry Heymann, Henry Heymann, Robert L. Benson	Regina Sarfaty, Joanna Neal, Doris Yarick, Charles O'Neill, Martial Singher
1961	Der Rosenkavalier	Richard Strauss	German	1911	John Crosby	Hans Busch	Eldon Elder, Eldon Elder, Robert L. Benson	Marguerite Willauer, Helen Vanni, Andrew Földi
1961	La bohème	Giacomo Puccini	Italian	1859	John Crosby	Atwood Levensaler	Henry Heymann, Patton Campbell, Robert L. Benson	Charles Anthony, Maria Ferriero, Doris Yarick, Robert Trehy
1961	Oedipus rex	Igor Stravinsky	English	1927	Igor Stravinsky; Robert Craft	Hans Busch	Henry Heymann, Tanya Moiseiwitsch, Robert L. Benson	Charles O'Neill, Mary Davenport, Robert Kirkham, Donald Gramm
1961	Perséphone	Igor Stravinsky	English	1934	Igor Stravinsky	Hans Busch	Henry Heymann, Vera de Bosset, Robert L. Benson	Vera Zorina, Loren Driscoll, Thomas Andrew
1961	The Ballad of Baby Doe	Douglas Moore	English	1956	Robert Baustian	Bill Butler	Eldon Elder, Eldon Elder, Robert L. Benson	Robert Trehy, Mary McMurray, Doris Yarick, Mary Davenport
1961	The Marriage of Figaro	Wolfgang Amadeus Mozart	Italian	1786	Robert Baustian	Hans Busch	Henry Heymann, Henry Heymann, Robert L. Benson	Robert Trehy, Maria Ferriero, Joanna Neal, Judith Raskin, Donald Gramm, Helen Vanni
1961	Neues vom Tage, (News of the Day)	Paul Hindemith	German	1954	Paul Hindemith	Don Moreland	Henry Heymann, Henry Heymann, Robert L. Benson	Loren Driscoll, Theodor Uppman, Andrew Földi, Marguerite Willauer
1962	Salome	Richard Strauss	German	1905	John Crosby	John Moriarty	Henry Heymann, Henry Heymann, Louise Guthman	Eleanor Lutton, Paul Franke, Elaine Bonazzi, Theodor Uppman
1962	Così fan tutte	Wolfgang Amadeus Mozart	Italian	1790	Robert Baustian	Atwood Levensaler	Patton Campbell, Louise Guthman	Saramae Endich, Helen Vanni, John McCollum, William Murphy, Donald Gramm
1962	La traviata	Giuseppe Verdi	Italian	1853	Robert Baustian	Edward Purrington	Henry Heymann, Henry Heymann, Louise Guthman	Maria di Gerlando, John McCollum, Theodor Uppman
1962	Joan of Arc at the Stake	Arthur Honegger	French	1938	Robert Baustian	John Butler	Henry Heymann, Henry Heymann, Louise Guthman	Vera Zorina, Atwood Levensaler, Saramae Endich, Doris Yarick
1962	Mavra	Igor Stravinsky (80th birthday celebration)	English	1922	Robert Baustian	Carolyn Lockwood	Henry Heymann, Henry Heymann, Louise Guthman	Doris Yarick, Mary Minott, Elaine Bonazzi, Paul Franke
1962	The Nightingale	Igor Stravinsky (80th birthday celebration)	English	1914	Igor Stravinsky	Bliss Hebert	Henry Heymann, Henry Heymann, Louise Guthman	Jeanette Scovotti, Therman Bailey, Donald Gramm, Elaine Bonazzi
1962	Oedipus rex	Igor Stravinsky (80th birthday celebration)	English	1927	John Crosby	John Crosby	Henry Heymann, David Hillman, Louise Guthman	George Shirley, Helen Vanni, Theodor Uppman, Donald Gramm
1962	Perséphone	Igor Stravinsky (80th birthday celebration)	English	1934	John Crosby	Thomas Andrew	Henry Heymann, Henry Heymann & Vera Stravinsky, Louise Guthman	Vera Zorina, Loren Driscoll
1962	The Rake's Progress	Igor Stravinsky (80th birthday celebration)	English	1951	Robert Craft	Bliss Hebert	Henry Heymann, Patton Campbell, Louise Guthman	Therman Bailey, Doris Yarick, Loren Driscoll, John Reardon
1962	Renard	Igor Stravinsky (80th birthday celebration)	English	1916	Robert Craft	Thomas Andrew	Henry Heymann; Henry Heymann, Luise Guthman	Ron Sequoio, Vincent Warren, Lawrence Eddington, Howard Sayette
1962	Tosca	Giacomo Puccini	Italian	1900	John Crosby	Henry Butler	Henry Heymann, David Hillman, Louise Guthman	Eleanor Lutton, George Shirley, John Reardon
1963	Lulu (Acts 1 & 2)	Alban Berg	German	1931	Robert Craft	Rudolf Heinrich	Rudolf Heinrich, Carl Seltzer, Rudolf Heinrich	Joan Carroll, Elaine Bonazzi, Donald Gramm
1963	Joan of Arc at the Stake	Arthur Honegger	French	1938	Robert Baustian	John Butler	Henry Heymann, Henry Heymann, Carl Seltzer	Vera Zorina, James Mitchell, Carla Marioni, Mildred Allen
1963	Don Giovanni	Wolfgang Amadeus Mozart	Italian	1787	Robert Baustian	Carolyn Lockwood	Henry Heymann, Henry Heymann, Carl Seltzer	John Reardon, Donald Gramm, Carla Marioni, Saramae Endich
1963	Madame Butterfly	Giacomo Puccini	Italian	1904	John Crosby	Henry Butler	Milton Duke, Milton Duke, Carl Seltzer	Mildred Allen, Stanley Kolk / George Shirley, Marlena Kleinman, William Metcalf / John Reardon
1963	L'enfant et les sortilèges	Maurice Ravel	French	1925	Robert Baustian	Bliss Hebert	Henry Heymann, Henry Heymann, Carl Seltzer	Patricia Brooks, Jenny Hudson, William Metcalf, Marlena Kleinman
1963	The Nightingale	Igor Stravinsky	English	1914	Robert Craft	Bliss Hebert	Henry Heymann, Henry Heymann, Carl Seltzer	Patricia Brooks, Catherine Christensen, Donald Gramm, Elaine Bonazzi
1963	Die Fledermaus	Johann Strauss II	German	1874	John Crosby	Henry Butler	Henry Heymann, Henry Heymann, Carl Seltzer	Stanley Kolk, Patricia Brooks, Beverly Bower, Marian Thompson, Henri Noel, Vera Zorina
1963	Der Rosenkavalier	Richard Strauss	German	1911	John Crosby	John Moriarty	Eldon Elder, Eldon Elder, Carl Seltzer	Marian Thompson, Helen Vanni, Andrew Földi, Doris Yarick
1964	Rigoletto	Giuseppe Verdi	Italian	1851	John Crosby	Bliss Hebert	John Braden, Henry Heymann, Georg Schreiber	Russell Christopher, Stanley Kolk, Jeanette Scovotti, Rosalind Hupp
1964	The Marriage of Figaro	Wolfgang Amadeus Mozart	Italian	1786	Robert Baustian	Carolyn Lockwood	John Braden, Henry Heymann, Georg Schreiber	Donald Gramm, Doris Yarick, John Reardon, Donna Jeffrey
1964	Carmen	Georges Bizet	French	1874	Werner Torkanowsky	John Moriarty	Henry Heymann, Henry Heymann, Georg Schreiber	Elaine Bonazzi / Beverly Wolff, Glade Peterson / George Shirley, Catherine Christensen, Chester Ludgin / John Reardon
1964	Gianni Schicchi	Giacomo Puccini	Italian	1918	Erich Kunzel	John Moriarty	John Wright Stevens, Henry Heymann, Georg Schreiber	John Reardon, Suzanne Preston, Gimi Beni
1964	L'enfant et les sortilèges	Maurice Ravel	French	1925	Robert Baustian	Bliss Hebert	Henry Heymann, Constance Mellen, Georg Schreiber	Doris Yarick
1964	Daphne	Richard Strauss	German	1938	John Crosby	Vera Zorina	Henry Heymann, Henry Heymann, Georg Schreiber	Sylvia Stahlman, David Sundquist, Glade Peterson, George Shirley
1964	La bohème	Giacomo Puccini	Italian	1859	John Crosby; Werner Torkanowsky	Andrew Földi	Henry Heymann, Henry Heymann, Georg Schreiber	Stanley Kolk, Doris Yarick, Nadja Witkowska, Russell Christopher, John West
1964	Lulu; Acts 1 & 2	Alban Berg	German	1931	Robert Craft	Rudolf Heinrich	Rudolf Heinrich, Rudolf Heinrich, Georg Schreiber	Joan Carroll, Stanley Kolk, Donald Gramm, George Shirley
1965	La traviata	Giuseppe Verdi	Italian	1853	John Crosby	John Moriarty	Henry Heymann, John Wright Stevens, Henry Heymann, Georg Schreiber	Sylvia Stahlman, William Whitesides / George Shirley, Benjamin Rayson / William Justus
1965	The Barber of Seville	Gioachino Rossini	Italian	1816	Erich Kunzel	Lotfi Mansouri	John Wright Stevens, Patton Campbell, Georg Schreiber	William Justus, Charles K.L. Davis, Helen Vanni
1965	Madame Butterfly	Giacomo Puccini	Italian	1904	John Crosby	Carlos Alexander	Milton Duke, Jack Edwards, Georg Schreiber	Mildred Allen, Paul Arnold / George Shirley, Benjamin Rayson / William Justus
1965	Lucia di Lammermoor	Gaetano Donizetti	Italian	1835	Robert Baustian	Lotfi Mansouri	Lawrence Reehling, Jack Edwards, Georg Schreiber	Jeanette Scovotti, William Justus, George Shirley, William Whitesides
1965	Arabella	Richard Strauss	German	1934	John Crosby	Carlos Alexander	John Wright Stevens, Jack Edwards, Georg Schreiber	Sylvia Stahlman, Jean Kraft, Catherine Christensen, John Craig, John Reardon
1965	Boulevard Solitude	Hans Werner Henze	German	1952	Robert Baustian	Bliss Hebert	Lawrence Reehling, Willa Kim, Georg Schreiber	George Shirley, Donald Gramm, Mildred Allen
1965	The Nose	Dmitri Shostakovich	Russian	1929	Erich Kunzel	John Moriarty	Lawrence Reehling, Lawrence Reehling, Georg Schreiber	William Whitesides, John Reardon, Paul Franke
1965	The Marriage of Figaro	Wolfgang Amadeus Mozart	Italian	1786	Robert Baustian	Carolyn Lockwood	John Braden, Henry Heymann, Georg Schreiber	Donald Gramm, Mildred Allen, Helen Vanni, John Reardon, Donna Jeffrey
1966	Tosca	Giacomo Puccini	Italian	1900	John Crosby	Lotfi Mansouri	John Wright Stevens, Jack Edwards, unk.	Beverly Bower / Maria di Gerlando, Ragnar Ulfung / John Alexander; Benjamin Rayson / Chester Ludgin
1966	La cenerentola	Gioachino Rossini	Italian	1812	Robert Baustian	Lotfi Mansouri	Lawrence Reehling, Lawrence Reehling, unk.	Helen Vanni, Peter Harrower, Gimi Beni, Julian Patrick / John Reardon
1966	Don Giovanni	Wolfgang Amadeus Mozart	Italian	1787	Robert Baustian	Bliss Hebert	Lawrence Reehling, Henry Heymann, unk.	Richard Cross, Donald Gramm, Joan Moynagh, Beverly Bower
1966	Dialogues of the Carmelites	Francis Poulenc	German	1957	Robert Baustian	Vera Zorina	Lawrence Reehling, Jack Edwards, unk.	David Holloway, Jean Kraft, Catherine Christensen, Dorothy Krebill
1966	The Rake's Progress	Igor Stravinsky	English	1951	Robert Craft	Bliss Hebert	John Wright Stevens, Patton Campbell	Doris Yarick, Ragnar Ulfung, Donald Gramm, Jean Kraft
1966	Capriccio	Richard Strauss	German	1942	John Crosby	Vera Zorina	John Wright Stevens, Jack Edwards, unk.	William Blankenship / Frans Van Daalen, Julian Patrick, Sylvia Stahlman
1966	Rigoletto	Giuseppe Verdi	Italian	1851	John Crosby	Lotfi Mansouri	John Wright Stevens, Henry Heymann, unk.	Chester Ludgin, Ragnar Ulfung / George Shirley, Jeanette Scovotti, Jean Kraft
1966	Wozzeck	Alban Berg	German	1931	Robert Craft	Lotfi Mansouri	Lawrence Reehling, Lawrence Reehling, unk.	Adib Fazah, Marguerite Willauer, Donald Gramm
1967	La bohème	Giacomo Puccini	Italian	1859	John Crosby	Vera Zorina	Joan Larkey, Jack Edwards, Joan Larkey	John Alexander, Mildred Allen / Doris Yarick; Patricia Wise, George Fortune, Adib Fazah
1967	The Barber of Seville	Gioachino Rossini	Italian	1816	Robert Baustian	Carolyn Lockwood	Joan Larkey, Patton Campbell, Joan Larkey	John Reardon, Helen Vanni, Charles Bressler
1967	Cardillac	Paul Hindemith	German	1926	Robert Craft	Bodo Igesz	Neil Peter Jampolis, Margaretta Maganini, unk.	Ragnar Ulfung, John Reardon, Doris Yarick
1967	Boulevard Solitude	Hans Werner Henze	German	1952	Robert Baustian	Bliss Hebert	Lawrence Reehling, Jack Edwards, Georg Schreiber	Patricia Brooks, Loren Driscoll, George Fortune
1967	The Marriage of Figaro	Wolfgang Amadeus Mozart	Italian	1786	Robert Baustian	Carolyn Lockwood	Lawrence Reehling, Henry Heymann, Georg Schreiber	Donald Gramm, Doris Yarick, Saramae Endich, James Justiss
1967	Salome	Richard Strauss	German	1905	John Crosby	Lotfi Mansouri	Henry Heymann, Henry Heymann, Georg Schreiber	Maria Kouba, Elaine Bonazzi, John Reardon, Ragnar Ulfung

=== The second theatre, 1968 to 1997 ===
Year	Opera	Composer	Lang.	Year	Conductor	Stage director	Designers	Notable singers
1968	Madame Butterfly	Giacomo Puccini	Italian	1904	John Crosby	Vera Zorina	Rouben Ter-Arutunian, Rouben Ter-Arutunian, Georg Schreiber	Maralin Niska / Felicia Weathers, John Alexander / John Stewart, John Reardon
1968	The Magic Flute	Wolfgang Amadeus Mozart	German	1791	Robert Baustian	Bliss Hebert	Lawrence Reehling, Willa Kim, Georg Schreiber	Benita Valente, Rita Shane, Stuart Burrows, Donald Gramm, William Workman, Ragnar Ulfung
1968	La traviata	Giuseppe Verdi	Italian	1853	John Crosby	Lotfi Mansouri	Robert O'Hearn, unk, Georg Schreiber	Patricia Brooks / Maralin Niska, Stuart Burrows / Anastasios Vrenios, George Fortune
1968	The Elixer of Love	Gaetano Donizetti	Italian	1832	Robert Baustian	Carolyn Lockwood	Neil Peter Jampolis, Robert O'Hearn, Georg Schreiber	Karan Armstrong, Stuart Burrows / Anastasios Vrenios, John Reardon, Gimi Beni, Jean Kraft
1968	Der Rosenkavalier	Richard Strauss	German	1911	John Crosby	Lotfi Mansouri	Neil Peter Jampolis, Patton Campbell, Neil Peter Jampolis	Helen Vanni, Sylvia Anderson, Andrew Földi, Anastasios Vrenios, Judith Raskin
1968	The Bassarids	Hans Werner Henze	German	1966	Hans Werner Henze	Bodo Igesz	Rouben Ter-Arutunian, Hal George, Georg Schreiber	John Reardon, Loren Driscoll, Regina Sarfaty, Evelyn Mandac
1968	Perséphone	Igor Stravinsky	English	1934	Robert Baustian	unk.	unk.	Vera Zorina, Anastasios Vrenios
1968	Die Jakobsleiter	Arnold Schoenberg	German	1961	Robert Baustian	Bodo Igesz	Neil Peter Jampolis, Hal George, Georg Schreiber	Donald Gramm, John Stewart, Charles Bressler, Thomas Jamerson
1969	Tosca	Giacomo Puccini	Italian	1900	John Crosby	Lotfi Mansouri	Neil Peter Jampolis, Patton Campbell, Neil Peter Jampolis	Maralin Niska / Mirna Lacambra, George Shirley / Erik Townsend, William Dooley / Delme Bryn-Jones
1969	Così fan tutte	Wolfgang Amadeus Mozart	Italian	1790	Gustav Meier	H. Wesley Balk	John Conklin, Patton Campbell, Georg Schreiber	Marguerite Willauer, Helen Vanni, Doris Yarick, John Stewart, John Reardon
1969	The Magic Flute	Wolfgang Amadeus Mozart	German	1791	Robert Baustian	Bliss Hebert	Lawrence Reehling, Willa Kim, Georg Schreiber	Doris Yarick, Jeanette Scovotti, Stuart Burrows, Donald Gramm, William Workman, Ragnar Ulfung
1969	The Nightingale	Igor Stravinsky	English	1914	Robert Baustian	Bliss Hebert	Willa Kim, Willa Kim	Jeanette Scovotti, Stuart Burrows, Doris Yarick, Peter Harrower, Jean Kraft
1969	Help, Help, the Globolinks!	Gian Carlo Menotti	English	1969	Gustav Meier	Gian Carlo Menotti	Willa Kim, Alwin Nikolais, Georg Schreiber	Judith Blegen, William Workman, John Reardon, Jean Kraft
1969	The Devils of Loudun	Krzysztof Penderecki	German	1969	Stanislaw Skrowaczewski	Konrad Swinarski	Rouben Ter-Arutunian, Rouben Ter-Arutunian, Georg Schreiber	Richard Cross, John Reardon, James Morris
1970	La traviata	Giuseppe Verdi	Italian	1853	John Crosby	Lotfi Mansouri	Robert Darling, unk, Georg Schreiber	Maralin Niska, George Shirley / Erik Townsend, William Walker
1970	The Marriage of Figaro	Wolfgang Amadeus Mozart	Italian	1786	Robert Baustian	Bliss Hebert	Allen Charles Klein, Allen Charles Klein, Georg Schreiber	Donald Gramm, Judith Blegen, Helen Vanni, John Reardon, Barbara Shuttleworth
1970	The Nightingale	Igor Stravinsky	English	1914	Robert Baustian	Bliss Hebert	Willa Kim, Willa Kim, Georg Schreiber	Loren Driscoll, Eve Gentry, Judith Blegen, Gimi Beni, Jean Kraft
1970	Help, Help, the Globolinks!	Gian Carlo Menotti	English	1969	Hugh Johnson	Elisa Ronstadt	Willa Kim, Alwin Nikolais, Georg Schreiber	Alan Opie, Judith Blegen, John Reardon, Douglas Perry
1970	Opera	Luciano Berio	Italian	1970	Dennis Russell Davies	Luciano Berio / Roberta Sklar	unk., Gwen Fabrikant, Georg Schreiber	Douglas Perry, Barbara Shuttleworth, Emily Tracy, Richard Lombardi
1971	Don Carlos	Giuseppe Verdi	Italian	1884	John Crosby	Lotfi Mansouri	Robert Darling, unk., Georg Schreiber	Jean Bonhomme, Joyce Barker, Joy Davidson / Patricia Johnson, John Shaw, Donald Gramm
1971	The Magic Flute	Wolfgang Amadeus Mozart	German	1791	Robert Baustian	Bliss Hebert	Lawrence Reehling, Willa Kim, Georg Schreiber	Joanna Bruno, Louise Lebrun / Rita Shane, Sidney Johnson / John Wakefield, Theodor Uppman, Douglas Perry, Don Garrard
1971	The Grand Duchess of Gerolstein	Jacques Offenbach	French	1867	John Crosby	Bliss Hebert	Allen Charles Klein, Suzanne Mess, Georg Schreiber	Elaine Bonazzi, Richard Best, John Wakefield, Donald Gramm, Richard Stilwell
1971	The Marriage of Figaro	Wolfgang Amadeus Mozart	Italian	1786	Robert Baustian	Bliss Hebert	Allen Charles Klein, Allen Charles Klein, Georg Schreiber	Kiri Te Kanawa, Theodor Uppman / John Shaw, Frederica von Stade
1971	The Flying Dutchman	Richard Wagner	German	1843	Edo de Waart	Bodo Igesz	Neil Peter Jampolis, Suzanne Mess, Georg Schreiber	John Shaw, Don Garrard, Joyce Barker
1971	Yerma	Heitor Villa-Lobos	English	1971	Christopher Keene	Basil Langton	Allen Charles Klein, Allen Charles Klein, Georg Schreiber	Mirna Lacambra, Frederica von Stade, Theodor Uppman, John Wakefield
1972	The Grand Duchess of Gerolstein	Jacques Offenbach	French	1867	John Crosby	Bliss Hebert	Allen Charles Klein, Suzanne Mess, Georg Schreiber	Huguette Tourangeau, Jack Davison, John Walker, Donald Gramm, Douglas Perry, Richard Stilwell
1972	Madame Butterfly	Giacomo Puccini	Italian	1904	John Crosby	Francis Rizzo	Neil Peter Jampolis, Rouben Ter-Arutunian, Georg Schreiber	George Shirley / John Stewart, Jean Kraft, Brent Ellis
1972	Don Giovanni	Wolfgang Amadeus Mozart	Italian	1787	Edo de Waart	Bodo Igesz	Neil Peter Jampolis, Suzanne Mess, Neil Peter Jampolis	?? Donald Gramm, Milla Andrew, George Shirley, Teresa Cahill, Frederica von Stade
1972	Pelléas et Mélisande	Claude Debussy	Italian	1902	Robert Baustian	Bliss Hebert	Allen Charles Klein; Allen Charles Klein; Georg Schreiber	Frederica von Stade, Richard Stilwell, Betty Allen
1972	Melusine	Aribert Reimann	German	1971	Christopher Keene	Bodo Igesz	Neil Peter Jampolis, Neil Peter Jampolis, Neil Peter Jampolis	Susan Belling, George Shirley, Jean Kraft, Alan Titus
1973	La bohème	Giacomo Puccini	Italian	1859	John Crosby	Ragnar Ulfung	Suzanne Mess, John Scheffler, Georg Schreiber	Joanna Bruno, Rita Shane / Catherine Wilson, William Lewis, Brent Ellis, Richard Barrett
1973	The Marriage of Figaro	Wolfgang Amadeus Mozart	Italian	1786	Robert Baustian	Bliss Hebert	Allen Charles Klein, Allen Charles Klein, Georg Schreiber	Donald Gramm / Spiro Malas, Catherine Malfitano, Helen Vanni, Michael Devlin, Judith Forst
1973	The Merry Widow	Franz Lehár	German	1905	John Crosby	Bliss Hebert	Allen Charles Klein, Suzanne Mess, Georg Schreiber	Catherine Wilson, Judith Forst, Judith Farris, Richard Barrett, Stuart Burrows, Ashley Putnam
1973	The Flying Dutchman	Richard Wagner	German	1843	Uri Segal	Bodo Igesz	Neil Peter Jampolis, Suzanne Mess, Georg Schreiber	Spiro Malas, Michael Best, William Dooley
1973	The Nightingale	Igor Stravinsky	English	1914	Robert Baustian	Bliss Hebert	Willa Kim, Willa Kim, Georg Schreiber	Stuart Burrows, Rita Shane, Barrie Smith, William Dansby, Michael Devlin, Isola Jones
1973	L'enfant et les sortilèges	Maurice Ravel	French	1925	Robert Baustian	Bliss Hebert	Allen Charles Klein, Allen Charles Klein, Georg Schreiber	Ragnar Ulfung, Judith Forst, Deborah Atkinson, Richard Barrett, Marlena Kleinman
1973	Owen Wingrave	Benjamin Britten	English	1971	John Nelson	Colin Graham	Hugh Scherrer, John Scheffler, Georg Schreiber	Jean Kraft, Donald Gramm, Michael Best, Alan Titus, Eleanor Steber, James Atherton
1974	La bohème	Giacomo Puccini	Italian	1859	John Crosby	Ragnar Ulfung	John Scheffler, Suzanne Mess, Georg Schreiber	Ellen Shade, Rita Shane, William Lewis, Brent Ellis
1974	The Magic Flute	Wolfgang Amadeus Mozart	German	1791	Robert Baustian	Bliss Hebert	Lawrence Reehling, Willa Kim, Georg Schreiber	Bonita Glenn, Patricia Wells, Raymond Gibbs, John Walker, Richard Stilwell, David Holloway
1974	The Grand Duchess of Gerolstein	Jacques Offenbach	French	1867	John Crosby	Bliss Hebert	Allen Charles Klein, unk., Suzanne Mess	Ann Howard, Jack Davison, David Hillman, Richard Best, David Holloway
1974	Lulu (Acts 1 & 2)	Alban Berg	German	1931	John Mauceri	Ragnar Ulfung	John Scheffler, Hugh Scherrer, Georg Schreiber	Patricia Brooks, William Dooley, William Lewis; Raymond Gibbs, Jack Davison, Andrew Földi, Jean Kraft
1974	L'Egisto	Francesco Cavalli	Italian	1643	John Cox	Raymond Leppart	Allen Charles Klein, Allen Charles Klein, Georg Schreiber	Don Garrard, Barrie Smith, James Bowman, Judith Forst, George Shirley, Ellen Shade
1975	Carmen	Georges Bizet	French	1874			Rouben Ter-Arutunian, Suzanne Mess, Georg Schreiber	Ann Howard / Gwendolyn Killebrew, Joanna Bruno, Jacques Trussel, Brent Ellis / Samuel Ramey
1975	Falstaff	Giuseppe Verdi	Italian	1893	Edo de Waart	Colin Graham	Allen Charles Klein, Suzanne Mess, Georg Schreiber	Thomas Stewart, Chris Merritt, Helen Vanni, Jean Kraft, Ruth Welting
1975	Così fan tutte	Wolfgang Amadeus Mozart	Italian	1790	Robert Baustian / John Mauceri	Richard Pearlman	Lare Schultz, Lare Schultz, Georg Schreiber	Ellen Shade, Maria Ewing, Janica Felty, Joanna Bruno, John Walker
1975	La vida breve	Manuel de Falla	Spanish	1913	John Crosby / Robert Baustian	Bliss Hebert	Allen Charles Klein, Maxine Willi Klein, Georg Schreiber	Betty Allen, Vinson Cole, Neil Shicoff
1975	L'enfant et les sortilèges	Maurice Ravel	French	1925	Robert Baustian	Bliss Hebert	Allen Charles Klein, Allen Charles Klein, Georg Schreiber	Faith Esham, Nancy Callman, William Parker, Phyllis Hunter
1975	The Cunning Little Vixen	Leoš Janáček	Czech	1924	Robert Baustian	Colin Graham	Tony Walton, Tony Walton, Georg Schreiber	Barbara Hendricks, Vinson Cole, William Dooley, Julie Idoine, Dana McMullan, Robert Tate
1976	La traviata	Giuseppe Verdi	Italian	1853	John Crosby	Patrick Bakman	Allen Charles Klein, Suzanne Mess, Georg Schreiber	Ellen Shade / Nancy Shade, William Lewis, Brent Ellis / Delme Bryn-Jones
1976	The Marriage of Figaro	Wolfgang Amadeus Mozart	Italian	1786	Robert Baustian	Bliss Hebert	Allen Charles Klein, Allen Charles Klein, Georg Schreiber	Donald Gramm, Leona Mitchell, Sheri Greenawald, Helen Vanni; Lenus Carlson, Faith Esham
1976	L'Egisto	Francesco Cavalli	Italian	1643	Raymond Leppard	John Cox	Allen Charles Klein, Allen Charles Klein, Georg Schreiber	Jerold Norman, Philip Booth, Sheri Greenawald, James Bowman, Linn Maxwell
1976	The Mother of Us All	Virgil Thomson	English	1947	Raymond Leppard	Peter Wood	Robert Indiana, Georg Schreiber	Mignon Dunn, Bonnie Godfrey, Aviva Orvath, Gene Ives, Ashley Putnam
1977	The Italian Straw Hat	Nino Rota	Italian	1955	John Crosby	Lou Galterio	David Mitchell, Dona Granata, Stephen Ross	Ashley Putnam, Ragnar Ulfung, Mark Pedrotti, Claude Corbeil
1977	Falstaff	Giuseppe Verdi	Italian	1893	Edo de Waart / Bruce Ferden	Colin Graham	Allen Charles Klein, Suzanne Mess, Rush Dudley	Thomas Stewart, Douglas Perry, Richard Dansby, Jean Kraft, Kathleen Kaun, Maureen Forrester, Sheri Greenawald
1977	Pelléas et Mélisande	Claude Debussy	Italian	1902	Robert Baustian	Bliss Hebert	Allen Charles Klein, Allen Charles Klein, Stephen Ross	Evelyn Mandac, Jean Kraft, Raymond Gibbs
1977	Fedora	Umberto Giordano	Italian	1898	John Crosby	Colin Graham	John Conklin, Dona Granata, Stephen Ross	Evelyn Lear, Douglas Perry, William Madsen
1977	Così fan tutte	Wolfgang Amadeus Mozart	Italian	1790	Raymond Leppard	Peter Wood	Paul Steinberg, Paul Steinberg, Stephen Ross	Linda Zoghby, Evelyn Petros, Jon Garrison, Stephen Dickson, Claude Corbeil
1978	Tosca	Giacomo Puccini	Italian	1900	John Crosby	Jack O'Brien	Sam Kirkpatrick, Dona Granata, Stephen Ross	Clamma Dale, Jacques Trussel, Victor Braun
1978	Count Ory	Gioachino Rossini	Italian	1828	Cal Stewart Kellogg	Christopher Alden	Paul Steinberg, Bob Wojewodski, Stephen Ross	John Aler, David Holloway, Ann Marie Perkins
1978	Eugene Onegin	Pyotr Ilyich Tchaikovsky	French	1879	Bruce Ferden	Colin Graham	John Conklin, Suzanne Mess, Gil Wechsler	Michael Devlin, Patricia Wells, Neil Shicoff, Ara Berberian
1978	Salome	Richard Strauss	German	1905	?	?	?	Josephine Barstow, Ragnar Ulfung
1978	The Duchess of Malfi	Stephen Oliver	English	1971	Steuart Bedford	Colin Graham	John Conklin, Dona Granata, Stephen Ross	Pamela Myers, William Dooley, James Atherton, Vonna Miller
1979	The Grand Duchess of Gerolstein	Jacques Offenbach	French	1867	John Crosby	Bliss Herbert	Allen Charles Klein, Suzanne Mess, Craig Miller	Stephen Dickson, Ann Howard, Claude Corbeil, Leo Goeke, Douglas Perry
1979	Lucia di Lammermoor	Gaetano Donizetti	Italian	1835	John Crosby	Lotfi Mansouri	Michael Yeargan / Lawrence King, Suzanne Mess, Craig Miller	Ashley Putnam, Michael Cousins, Brent Ellis, Gwynne Howell, Joseph Frank
1979	The Magic Flute	Wolfgang Amadeus Mozart	German	1791	Raymond Leppard	Peter Wood	Sam Kirkpatrick, Sam Kirkpatrick, Craig Miller	Isobel Buchannan / Ellen Shade, Sharon Bennett, David Kuebler, Stephen Dickson, Ragnar Ulfung
1979	Lulu (with Act 3)	Alban Berg	German	1931	Michael Tilson Thomas	Colin Graham	John Conklin, John Conklin, Craig Miller	Nancy Shade, Lenus Carlson, William Dooley, Andrew Földi
1979	Salome	Richard Strauss	German	1905	?	?	?	Ragnar Ulfung, Jean Kraft, Josephine Barstow
1980	La traviata	Giuseppe Verdi	Italian	1853	John Crosby	Bodo Igesz	Paul Steinberg, John David Ridge, Craig Miller	Ashley Putnam, Michael Cousins, Brent Ellis
1980	The Magic Flute	Wolfgang Amadeus Mozart	German	1791	David Agler	Vincent Liotta	Sam Kirkpatrick, Sam Kirkpatrick, Craig Miller	Ellen Shade, Jeryl Metz, Raymond Gibbs, William Parker, Ragnar Ulfung, Janet Northway
1980	Eugene Onegin	Pyotr Ilyich Tchaikovsky	French	1879	John Nelson	Stephen Dickson	John Conklin, Suzanne Mess, Peter Kaczorowski	Patricia Wells, David Rendall, Richard Stilwell, Philip Booth
1980	Erwartung	Arnold Schoenberg	German	1924	David Agler	Bliss Hebert	Allen Charles Klein, Allen Charles Klein, Craig Miller	Nancy Shade
1980	Von heute auf morgen	Arnold Schoenberg	German	1930	George Manahan	Bliss Hebert	Allen Charles Klein, Allen Charles Klein; Craig Miller	William Stone, Carol Wilcox, Mary Shearer, Barry Busse
1980	Die Jakobsleiter	Arnold Schoenberg	German	1961	Robert Baustian	Bodo Igesz	Neil Peter Jampolis, Hal George, Neil Peter Jampolis	William Dooley, Janet Northway, Andrew Földi
1980	Elektra	Richard Strauss	German	1921	John Crosby	Goran Järvefelt	Carl Friedrich Oberle, Craig Miller, Carl Friedrich Oberle	Danica Mastilović, Eszter Kovacs, Rosalind Elias, William Dooley, Ragnar Ulfung
1981	La bohème	Giacomo Puccini	Italian	1859	John Crosby	Ragnar Ulfung	John Scheffler, Hal George, Craig Miller	Faith Esham, Mary Shearer, Brent Ellis, Vinson Cole
1981	The Barber of Seville	Gioachino Rossini	Italian	1816	Raymond Leppard/ George Manahan	Lou Galterio	Zack Brown, Zack Brown, Peter Kaczorowski	Håkan Hagegård, Neil Rosenshein, Marius Rintzler / Gunter von Kannen, Janice Hall
1981	Daphne	Richard Strauss	German	1938	John Crosby	Colin Graham	John Conklin, John Conklin, Craig Miller	Roberta Alexander, Carolyn James, Barry Busse, James Atherton
1981	The Rake's Progress	Igor Stravinsky	English	1951	Raymond Leppard; George Manahan	Bliss Hebert	Allen Charles Klein, Allen Charles Klein, Craig Miller	James Morris, Elizabeth Hynes, Jon Garrison
1981	News of the Day	Paul Hindemith	German	1954	Bruce Ferden	Lou Galterio	Allen Charles Klein, Steven B. Feldman, Craig Miller	Jean Kraft, Mary Shearer, James Atherton, William Workman
1982	The Marriage of Figaro	Wolfgang Amadeus Mozart	Italian	1786	Edo de Waart	Rhoda Levine	John Conklin, unk, Craig Miller	Malcolm King, Sheri Greenawald, Ellen Shade, Michael Devlin, Judith Forst
1982	Die Fledermaus	Johann Strauss II	German	1874	John Crosby	Lou Galterio	Zack Brown, Dona Granata, Craig Miller	Mary Jane Johnson, Neil Rosenshein / Berry McCauley, Gianna Rolandi, Alan Titus, Richard Stilwell
1982	Die Liebe der Danae	Richard Strauss	German	1944	John Crosby	Colin Graham	Rouben Ter-Arutunian, Rouben Ter-Arutunian, Craig Miller	Ashley Putnam, Victor Braun, James Hoback, Mary Jane Johnson
1982	Mignon	Ambroise Thomas	French	1866	Kenneth Montgomery	Bliss Hebert	Allen Charles Klein, Steven B. Feldman, Peter Kaczorowski	Frederica von Stade, Gianna Rolandi, Barry McCauley, Claude Corbeil
1982	The Confidence Man	George Rochberg	German	1982	C. William Harwood	Richard Pearlman	John Scheffler, John Scheffler, Craig Miller	Brent Ellis, William Chamberlain, Donald Collup, Joseph Levitt
1983	Orpheus in the Underworld	Jacques Offenbach	French	1858	John Crosby	Bliss Hebert	Nancy Thun, Steven B. Feldman, Craig Miller	Karen Hunt, Neil Rosenshein, James Atherton, Sheryl Woods
1983	Arabella	Richard Strauss	German	1934	John Crosb	Mark Lamos	John Conklin, John Conklin, Craig Miller	Ellen Shade, Sheryl Woods, Warren Ellsworth, Victor Braun
1983	L'Orione	Francesco Cavalli	Italian	1653	Raymond Leppard	Peter Wood	John Bury, John Bury, Craig Miller	Cynthia Clarey, Sandra Moon, Thomas Stewart, Gunter von Kannen, Evelyn Lear, Rosalind Elias
1983	The Turn of the Screw	Benjamin Britten	English	1954	Edo de Waart	David Alden	Robert Israel, Robert Israel, Craig Miller	Sheri Greenawald, Heather Dials, David Owen, Michael Myers, Mary Jane Johnson
1983	Don Pasquale	Gaetano Donizetti	Italian	1843	Raymond Leppard	Anthony Besch	Steven Rubin, John David Ridge, Craig Miller	Gunter von Kannen, Thomas Hampson, Robert Gambill
1984	The Florence Tragedy	Alexander von Zemlinsky	German	1917	John Crosby	Bliss Hebert	Nancy Thun, Steven B. Feldman, Craig Miller	Edward Crafts, Lisa Turetsky, John Stewart
1984	Violanta	Erich Wolfgang Korngold	German	1916	John Crosby	Bliss Hebert	Nancy Thun, Steven B. Feldman, Craig Miller	Mary Jane Johnson, John Stewart, Karen Beardsley, Carolyn James, William Dooley
1984	The Magic Flute	Wolfgang Amadeus Mozart	German	1791	George Manahan	Robin Thompson	Steven Rubin, Willa Kim, Craig Miller	Sheri Greenawald, Sally Wolf, David Kuebler, Stephen Dickson, Gwynne Howell, Karen Beardsley
1984	Il matrimonio segreto	Domenico Cimarosa	German	1792	Kenneth Montgomery	Renato Capecchi	Steven Rubin, Steven Rubin, James F. Ingalls	Rockwell Blake, Erie Mills, Renato Capecchi, Janice Hall
1984	Intermezzo	Richard Strauss	German	1924	John Crosby	Goran Jarvefelt	Carl Friedrich Oberle, Carl Friedrich Oberle, Craig Miller	Elisabeth Söderström, Alan Titus, Melanie Helton, Jason Stanley-Coffey
1984	We Come to the River	Hans Werner Henze	German	1976	Bernhard Kontarsky	Alfred Kirchner	John Conklin, John Conklin, Craig Miller	Susan Quittmeyer, Victor Braun, Jean Kraft, Jean Kraft, Wilbur Pauley
1985	The Marriage of Figaro	Wolfgang Amadeus Mozart	Italian	1786	Scott Bergeson	Goran Jarvefelt	Carl Friedrich Oberle, Carl Friedrich Oberle, Craig Miller	Faith Esham, Mary Jane Johnson, Brent Ellis, Susan Quittmeyer, Edward Crafts, Ragnar Ulfung, Kevin Langan
1985	Orpheus in the Underworld	Jacques Offenbach	French	1858	John Crosby	Bliss Hebert	Nancy Thun, Steven B. Feldman, Michael Lincoln	Judy Kaye, Peter Kazaras, Michael Ballam, Beverly Morgan, Greer Grimsley
1985	Die Liebe der Danae	Richard Strauss	German	1944	John Crosby	Bruce Donnell	Rouben Ter-Arutunian, Rouben Ter-Arutunian, Michael Baumgarten	Victor Braun, Glenn Siebert, Ragnar Ulfung, Ashley Putnam, Cynthia Haymon
1985	The English Cat	Hans Werner Henze	German	1983	George Manahan	Charles Ludlam	Steven Rubin; Steven Rubin, Craig Miller	Inga Nielsen, Lisa Turetsky, Michael Myers, Michael Ballam, Greer Grimsley
1985	The Tempest	John Eaton	German	1985	Richard Bradshaw	Bliss Hebert	Allen Charles Klein, Allen Charles Klein, Craig Miller	Timothy Noble, Joseph Frank, John Stewart, Kevin Langan, Colenton Freeman, Sally Wolf, Susan Quittmeyer
1986	The Magic Flute	Wolfgang Amadeus Mozart	German	1791	George Manahan	Ken Cazan	Steven Rubin, unk., Craig Miller	Sylvia McNair, Sally Wolf, Jon Garrison, Kevin Langan, Anthony Laciura
1986	The Egyptian Helen	Richard Strauss	German	1928	John Crosby	Goran Jarvefelt	Michael Yeargan, Michael Yeargan, Craig Miller	Mildred Tyree, Sheryl Woods, Clarity (Carolyn) James, Dennis Bailey, Michael Devlin
1986	Die Fledermaus	Johann Strauss II	German	1874	John Crosby	Charles Ludlam	Andrew Jackness, Andrew Marlay, Craig Miller	Ragnar Ulfung, Nancy Gustafson, Mikael Melbye, Joyce Castle, Sheryl Woods
1986	L'incoronazione di Poppea	Claudio Monteverdi	German	1643	Kenneth Montgomery	Bliss Hebert	Allen Charles Klein, Allen Charles Klein, Neil Peter Jampolis	Carmen Balthrop, Jeffrey Gall, Judith Forst, Anthony Laciura, Kevin Langan
1986	The King Goes to France	Aulis Sallinen	German	1928	Richard Buckley	Alfred Kirchner	John Conklin, John Conklin, unk.	William Mekeel, James Ramlet, David Garrison, Mikael Melbye, Stephanie Sundine, Sally Wolf
1987	Madame Butterfly	Giacomo Puccini	Italian	1904				
1987	The Marriage of Figaro	Wolfgang Amadeus Mozart	Italian	1786				Nico Castel
1987	Ariodante	George Frideric Handel	Italian	1735				Tatiana Troyanos
1987	Die schweigsame Frau	Richard Strauss	German	1935				
1987	The Nose	Dmitri Shostakovich	Russian	1929				Alan Titus, Ramlet
1988	Die Fledermaus	Johann Strauss II	German	1874				
1988	Così fan tutte	Wolfgang Amadeus Mozart	Italian	1790				Christen, Corbell
1988	Flying Dutchman	Richard Wagner	German	1843	Edo de Waart			James Morris
1988	Feuersnot	Richard Strauss	German	1901				
1988	Friedenstag	Richard Strauss	German	1938				Alessandra Marc
1988	Die schwarze Maske	Krzysztof Penderecki	German	1986				Timothy Nolen
1989	La traviata	Giuseppe Verdi	Italian	1853				Susan Graham
1989	La Calisto	Francesco Cavalli	Italian	1651				Tatiana Troyanos, Kolionyjec
1989	Chérubin	Jules Massenet	French	1905				Frederica von Stade, Huffstodt
1989	Der Rosenkavalier	Richard Strauss	German	1911				Wolf, Parrish, Piland, Mentzer
1989	A Night at the Chinese Opera	Judith Weir	English	1987				
1990	La bohème	Giacomo Puccini	Italian	1859				
1990	Così fan tutte	Wolfgang Amadeus Mozart	Italian	1790				Susan Graham
1990	Orfeo ed Euridice	Christoph Willibald Gluck	Italian	1762				Marilyn Horne
1990	Ariadne auf Naxos	Richard Strauss	German	1916				Alessandra Marc, Ben Heppner, Susan Graham
1990	Judith	Siegfried Matthus	German	1982				
1991	La traviata	Giuseppe Verdi	Italian	1853				
1991	The Marriage of Figaro	Wolfgang Amadeus Mozart	Italian	1786				Bryn Terfel, Graham, Loup
1991	La fanciulla del West	Giacomo Puccini	Italian	1910				Johnson
1991	Die schweigsame Frau	Richard Strauss	German	1935				Eric Halfvarson, Harris, Wages, Mills, Thomsen
1991	Oedipus	Wolfgang Rihm	German	1987				
1992	Die Fledermaus	Johann Strauss II	German	1874				
1992	Don Giovanni	Wolfgang Amadeus Mozart	Italian	1787				
1992	The Beggar's Opera	John Gay	English	1728	Nicholas McGegan	Christopher Alden	Miller	David Garrison, Timothy Nolen
1992	Der Rosenkavalier	Richard Strauss	German	1911	John Crosby	John Copley	John Conklin	Susanne Mentzer, Ashley Putnam, Eric Halfvarson, Ragnar Ulfung, Joyce Castle, Stanford Olsen
1992	The Sorrows of Young Werther	Hans-Jürgen von Bose	German	1988	George Manahan	Francesca Zambello	Miller	Ollmann, Carl Tanner
1993	La bohème	Giacomo Puccini	Italian	1859				
1993	The Magic Flute	Wolfgang Amadeus Mozart	German	1791				Ragnar Ulfung
1993	Xerxes	George Frideric Handel	English	1738				Frederica von Stade
1993	Capriccio	Richard Strauss	German	1942	John Crosby	Decker	Miller	Eric Halfvarson, Richard Stilwell, Katherine Ciesinski, Darren Keith Woods
1993	The Protagonist, The Tsar Has His Photograph Taken	Kurt Weill	German	1928				
1994	Tosca	Giacomo Puccini	Italian	1900				
1994	The Barber of Seville	Gioachino Rossini	Italian	1816				Ragnar Ulfung
1994	The Abduction from the Seraglio	Wolfgang Amadeus Mozart	German	1782				
1994	Intermezzo	Richard Strauss	German	1924				Sheri Greenawald, Mills
1994	Blond Eckbert	Judith Weir	English	1994				
1995	Countess Mariza	Emmerich Kálmán	German	1924				
1995	The Marriage of Figaro	Wolfgang Amadeus Mozart	Italian	1786				
1995	La fanciulla del West	Giacomo Puccini	Italian	1910				
1995	Salome	Richard Strauss	German	1905				
1995	Modern Painters	David Lang	German	1905		Francesca Zambello		Nadler, Travis, Panagulias
1996	Madame Butterfly	Giacomo Puccini	Italian	1904				
1996	Don Giovanni	Wolfgang Amadeus Mozart	Italian	1787				
1996	The Rake's Progress	Igor Stravinsky	English	1951	Kenneth Montgomery	James Robinson	Bruno Schwengl, Bruno Schwengl, Christopher Akerlind	Sylvia McNair, Richard Croft, Dale Travis, Richard Cowan
1996	Daphne	Richard Strauss	German	1938				Watson
1996	Emmeline	Tobias Picker	English	1996	George Manaham	Francesca Zambello		Patricia Racette, Owens
1997	La traviata	Giuseppe Verdi	Italian	1853				
1997	Così fan tutte	Wolfgang Amadeus Mozart	Italian	1790				
1997	Semele	George Frideric Handel	English	1744				Kevin Langan
1997	Arabella	Richard Strauss	German	1934				
1997	Ashoka's Dream	Peter Lieberson	German	1934	Richard Bradshaw	Stephen Wadsworth	Lynch, Martin Pakledinaz	Lorraine Hunt Lieberson, Ollman

=== The Crosby Theatre from 1998 ===
The theatre was named for John Crosby as well as his parents after John Crosby's death in 2002.

Year	Opera	Composer	Lang.	Year |	Conductor	Stage director	Designers	Notable singers
1998	Madame Butterfly	Giacomo Puccini	Italian	1904	John Crosby	John Copley	Bruno Schwengl, Michael Stennett, Duane Schuler	Miriam Gauci, Martin Thompson, Peter Coleman-Wright / Richard Stilwell, Judith Christin
1998	The Magic Flute	Wolfgang Amadeus Mozart	German	1791	Robert Spano	Jonathan Miller	Roni Toren, Judy Levin, Duane Schuler	Raymond Very, Heidi Grant Murphy, Thomas Barrett, Jami Rogers / Cyndia Sieden, Ryland Davies, Stephen Richardson
1998	Béatrice et Bénédict	Hector Berlioz	French	1862	Edo de Waart	Tim Albery	Antony McDonald, Antony McDonald, Jennifer Tipton	Susan Graham, Gordon Gietz, Ronn Carroll, Elizabeth Futral, Nathan Gunn
1998	Salome	Richard Strauss	German	1905	John Crosby	Ken Cazan	Tom Hennes, Martin Pakledinaz, Amy Appleyard	Helen Field, Kenneth Riegel, Anne-Marie Owens, Claudio Otelli
1998	A Dream Play	Ingvar Lidholm	Swedish	1992	Hal France	Colin Graham	Derek McLane, David C. Woolard, Amy Appleyard	Sylvia McNair, Richard Stilwell, Ragnar Ulfung, Håkan Hagegård
1999	Countess Mariza	Emmerich Kálmán	German	1924	John Crosby	Daniel Pelzig	Maxine Willi Klein, Dona Granata, Duane Schuler	Sheri Greenawald, Tamara Acosta, Ryland Davies, Kevin Anderson
1999	Idomeneo	Wolfgang Amadeus Mozart	Italian	1781	Kenneth Montgomery	John Copley	John Conklin, Johann Stegmeir, Duane Schuler	Jerry Hadley, Catrin Wyn-Davies, Gordon Gietz, Janice Watson
1999	Ariadne auf Naxos	Richard Strauss	German	1916	John Crosby	Bruce Donnell	Kevin Rupnik, Mimi Maxmen / Kevin Rupnik, Daniel Murray	Christine Brewer, Elizabeth Futral, Nathan Gunn, Richard Stilwell
1999	Dialogues of the Carmelites	Francis Poulenc	German	1957	Stephane Deneve	Francesca Zambello	unk., Alison Chitty, Alison Chitty	Christine Goerke, Patricia Racette, Sheila Nadler, Richard Stilwell
1999	Carmen	Georges Bizet	French	1874				
2000	Rigoletto	Giuseppe Verdi	Italian	1851	Richard Buckley	Mikael Melbye	Mikael Melbye, Zack Brown, Duane Schuler	Kim Josephson, Martin Thompson / Paul Charles Clarke, Elizabeth Futral, Beth Clayton
2000	The Marriage of Figaro	Wolfgang Amadeus Mozart	Italian	1786	Kenneth Montgomery	Thor Steingraber	Robert Perdziola, Robert Perdziola, Duane Schuler	John Relyea, Catrin Wyn-Davies, Joyce DiDonato, Jochen Schmeckenbecher
2000	Ermione	Gioachino Rossini	Italian	1819	Robert Tweten / Evelilno Pido	Jonathan Miller	Isabella Bywater, Isabella Bywater, Duane Schuler	Alex Penda, Gregory Kunde, Barry Banks, Celena Shafer
2000	Elektra	Richard Strauss	German	1921	John Crosby	John Copley	Bruno Schwengl, Bruno Schwengl, Adam Silverman	Mary Jane Johnson, Susan B. Anthony, Greer Grimsley, Ragnar Ulfung
2000	Venus und Adonis	Hans Werner Henze	German	1997	Richard Bradshaw	Alfred Kirchner	John Conklin, David C. Woolard, Jennifer Tipton	Lauren Flanigan, Stephen West, John Daszak
2001	Lucia di Lammermoor	Gaetano Donizetti	Italian	1835	Richard Buckley	Thor Steingraber	Dipu Gupta, Joel Berlin, Duane Schuler	Alexandra von der Weth, Oziel Garza-Ornelas, Jeffrey Wells, Frank Lopardo, Richard Crawley
2001	Falstaff	Giuseppe Verdi	Italian	1893	Alan Gilbert	Jonathan Miller	Robert Israel, Clare Mitchell, Duane Schuler	Andrew Shore, Anthony Laciura, Wilbur Pauley, Judith Christin, Alwyn Mellor, Jill Grove, Danielle de Niese
2001	Mitridate	Wolfgang Amadeus Mozart	Italian	1770	Kenneth Montgomery	Francisco Negrin	Anthony Baker, Anthony Baker, Allen Hahn	Donald Kaasch, Laura Aiken, Bejun Mehta, Celena Shafer
2001	The Egyptian Helen	Richard Strauss	German	1928	John Crosby	Bruce Donnell	Adam Stockhausen, Adam Stockhausen, Rick Fisher	Christine Brewer, Judith Howarth, Jill Grove, Mark Delavan
2001	Wozzeck	Alban Berg	German	1931	Vladimir Jurowski	Daniel Slater	Robert I. Hopkins, Robert I. Hopkins, Rick Fisher	Anthony Laciura, Anne Schwanewilms, Håkan Hagegård; Ragnar Ulfung
2002	Eugene Onegin	Pyotr Ilyich Tchaikovsky	French	1879	Alan Gilbert	Jonathan Miller	Isabella Bywater, Isabella Bywater, Duane Schuler	Scott Hendricks, Patricia Racette, Kurt Streit, Rod Gilfry, Valerian Ruminski / Eric Halfvarson
2002	The Italian Girl in Algiers	Gioachino Rossini	Italian	1813	Darik Knutsen	Edward Hastings	Robert Innes Hopkins, David C. Woolard, Duane Schuler	Stephanie Blythe, Mark S. Doss
2002	La clemenza di Tito	Wolfgang Amadeus Mozart	Italian	1791	Kenneth Montgomery	Chas Rader-Shieber	David Zinn, David Zinn, Rick Fisher	Joyce DiDonato, Alex Penda, Isabel Bayrakdarian, Kristine Jepson
2002	La traviata	Giuseppe Verdi	Italian	1853	John Crosby	Bruce Donnell	Robert Perdziola, David Walker, Rick Fisher	Sondra Radvanovsky
2002	L'amour de loin	Kaija Saariaho	French	2000	Robert Spano	Peter Sellars	George Tsypin, Martin Pakledinaz, James F. Ingalls	Dawn Upshaw, Monica Groop, Gerald Finley
2003	La belle Hélène	Jacques Offenbach	French	1864	Kenneth Montgomery	Laurent Pelly	Chantal Thomas, Laurent Pelly, Duane Schuler	Barry Banks, Timothy Nolen, Susan Graham, William Burden
2003	Così fan tutte	Wolfgang Amadeus Mozart	Italian	1790	Darik Knutsen	James Robinson	Allen Moyer, David C. Woolard, Duane Schuler	Ana María Martínez, Troy Cook, Patricia Risley, Charles Castronovo, Andrew Shore
2003	Intermezzo	Richard Strauss	German	1924	Kenneth Montgomery	Ken Cazan	Carl Friedrich Oberle, Carl Friedrich Oberle, Rick Fisher	Judith Howarth, Scott Hendricks, Brandon Jovanovich, Mark Garrett
2003	Káťa Kabanová	Leoš Janáček	Czech	1921	Steven Sloane/ Robert Tweten	Jonathan Kent	Paul Brown, Paul Brown, Duane Schuler	Patricia Racette, Michael Smallwood, Judith Forst, Patricia Risley
2003	Madame Mao	Bright Sheng	English	2003	John Fiore	Colin Graham	Neil Patel, David C. Woolard, Rick Fisher	Anna Christy, Alan Opie, Kelly Kaduce
2004	Simon Boccanegra	Giuseppe Verdi	Italian	1857	Corrado Rovaris	Stefano Vizioli	Robert Innes Hopkins, Anna Marie Heinreich, Duane Schuler	Mark Delavan / Anthony Michaels-Moore, Patricia Racette, Marcus Haddock
2004	Don Giovanni	Wolfgang Amadeus Mozart	Italian	1787	Alan Gilbert / Robert Tweten	Chas Rader-Shieber	David Zinn, David Zinn, Duane Schuler	Mariusz Kwiecień, Ana María Martínez, Kevin Short, Christina Pier
2004	Béatrice et Bénédict	Hector Berlioz	French	1862	Kenneth Montgomery	Tim Albery	Antony McDonald, Antony McDonald, Jennifer Tipton	Viktoria Vizin, William Burden, Celena Shafer, Jill Grove
2004	Agrippina	George Frideric Handel	English	1709	Harry Bicket	Francisco Negrin	Allen Moyer, Allen Moyer, Jennifer Tipton	Christine Goerke, Kristine Jepson, Corey McKern, David Walker
2004	La sonnambula	Vincenzo Bellini	English	1831	Evelilno Pido	Stephan Grogler	Veronique Seymat, Veronique Seymat, Rick Fisher	Natalie Dessay, Shalva Mukeria, Giovanni Furlanetto, Evelyn Pollock
2005	Turandot	Giacomo Puccini	Italian	1926	Alan Gilbert	Douglas Fitch	Douglas Fitch / Adam Stockhausen, Willa Kim, Duane Schuler	Jennifer Wilson, Carl Tanner / Dongwon Shin, Patricia Racette / Serena Farnocchia
2005	The Barber of Seville	Gioachino Rossini	Italian	1816	Kenneth Montgomery	Stefano Vizioli	Riccardo Hernandez, Anna Marie Heinreich, Duane Schuler	Brian Leerhuber, Ana María Martínez, Bruce Sledge, Dale Travis
2005	Lucio Silla	Wolfgang Amadeus Mozart	Italian	1772	Bernard Labadie	Jonathan Kent	Paul Brown, Paul Brown, Duane Schuler	Gregory Kunde, Susan Graham, Celena Shafer, Anna Christy
2005	Peter Grimes	Benjamin Britten	English	1945	Alan Gilbert	Paul Curran	Robert Innes Hopkins, Robert Innes Hopkins, Rick Fisher	Anthony Dean Griffey, Wilbur Pauley, Christine Brewer, Alan Opie, Michael Langan
2005	Ainadamar	Osvaldo Golijov	Spanish	2003	Miguel Harth-Bedoya	Peter Sellars	Gronk, Gabriel Berry, James F. Ingalls	Dawn Upshaw, Jessica Rivera, Kelley O'Connor
2006	Carmen	Georges Bizet	French	1874	Alan Gilbert	Rudolfsson	Patel, Rudolfsson, Duane Schuler	Anne Sofie von Otter, Jennifer Black
2006	The Magic Flute	Wolfgang Amadeus Mozart	German	1791	Lacey	Tim Albery	Hoheisel, Jennifer Tipton	Toby Spence, Susanna Phillips, Natalie Dessay
2006	Cendrillon (Cinderella)	Jules Massenet	French	1899	Kenneth Montgomery	Laurent Pelly	Barbara de Limburg, Laurent Pelly, Duane Schuler	Joyce DiDonato, Richard Stilwell, Judith Forst, Eglise Gutierrez, Jennifer Holloway
2006	Salome	Richard Strauss	German	1905	John Fiore	Bruce Donnell	Neil Patel, Neil Patel, Duane Schuler	Janice Watson, Ragnar Ulfung, Anne-Marie Owens, Dimitri Pittas, Greer Grimsley
2006	The Tempest	Thomas Adès	English	2004	Alan Gilbert	Jonathan Kent	Paul Brown, Paul Brown, Duane Schuler	Rod Gilfry, Cyndia Sieden, Toby Spence, Chris Merritt, Gwynne Howell
2007	La bohème	Giacomo Puccini	Italian	1859	Corrado Rovaris	Paul Curran	Kevin Knight, Kevin Knight, Rick Fisher	Gwyn Hughes Jones / Dimitri Pittas, Jennifer Black/ Serena Farnocchia, Corey McKern / James Westman, Alexander Vinogradov, Nicole Cabell
2007	Così fan tutte	Wolfgang Amadeus Mozart	Italian	1790	William Lacey	James Robinson	Allen Moyer, David C. Woolard, Duane Schuler	Norman Reinhardt, Mark Stone, Susanna Phillips, Katharine Goeldner, Dale Travis, Susanne Mentzer
2007	Daphne	Richard Strauss	German	1938	Kenneth Montgomery	Mark Lamos	Allen Moyer, Joan Greenwood, Rick Fisher	Erin Wall, Garrett Sorenson, Scott MacAllister
2007	Tea: A Mirror of Soul	Tan Dun	English	2002	Lawrence Renes	Amon Miyamoto	Rumi Matsui, Masatomo Ota, Rick Fisher	Nancy Maultsby, Kelly Kaduce, Christian Van Horn, Roger Honeywell
2007	Platée	Jean-Philippe Rameau	Italian	1745	Harry Bicket	Laurent Pelly	Chantal Thomas, Laurent Pelly, Duane Schuler	Norman Reinhardt, Heidi Stober, Wilber Pauley, Ariana Chris, Jean-Paul Fouchécourt
2008	Falstaff	Giuseppe Verdi	Italian	1893	Paolo Arrivabeni	Kevin Newbury	Allen Moyer, Clare Mitchell, Duane Schuler	Laurent Naouri / Anthony Michaels-Moore, Nancy Maultsby, Claire Rutter, Kelley O'Connor
2008	The Marriage of Figaro	Wolfgang Amadeus Mozart	Italian	1786	Kenneth Montgomery / Robert Tweten	Jonathan Kent	PaulBrown, Paul Brown, Duane Schuler	Luca Pisaroni, Susanna Phillips, Isabel Leonard, Mariusz Kwiecień
2008	Billy Budd	Benjamin Britten	English	1951	Edo de Waart	Paul Curran	Robert I. Hopkins, Robert I. Hopkins, Rick Fisher	Teddy Tahu Rhodes, William Burden, Peter Rose, Richard Stilwell
2008	Radamisto	George Frideric Handel	Italian	1720	Harry Bicket	David Alden	Gideon Davey, Gideon Davey, Rick Fisher	Laura Claycomb, David Daniels, Luca Pisaroni, Deborah Domanski, Laura Claycomb, Heidi Stober
2008	Adriana Mater	Kaija Saariaho	French	2006	Ernest Martinez Izquierdo	Peter Sellars	George Tsypi, Martin Pakledinaz, James F. Ingalls	Monica Groop, Pia Freund, Joseph Kaiser, Matthew Best
2009	La traviata	Giuseppe Verdi	Italian	1853	Frédéric Chaslin	Laurent Pelly	Chantal Thomas, Laurent Pelly, Duane Schuler	Natalie Dessay, Saimir Pirgu, Laurent Naouri / Anthony Michaels-Moore
2009	The Elixir of Love	Gaetano Donizetti	Italian	1832	Corrado Rovaris	Stephen Lawless	Ashley Martin-Davis, Ashley Martin-Davis, Pat Collins	Jennifer Black, Dimitri Pittas, Patrick Carfizzi, Thomas Hammons
2009	Don Giovanni	Wolfgang Amadeus Mozart	Italian	1787	Lawrence Renes	Chas Rader-Shieber	David Zinn, David Zinn, Japhy Weideman/ orig: Duane Schuler	Lucas Meecham, Susanna Phillips, Kate Lindsey, Elza van den Heever
2009	The Letter	Paul Moravec	English	2009	Patrick Summers	Jonathan Kent	Hildegard Bechtler, Tom Ford, Duane Schuler	Patricia Racette, Anthony Michaels-Moore, Roger Honeywell, James Maddalena
2009	Alceste	Christoph Willibald Gluck	Italian	1767	Kenneth Montgomery	Francisco Negrin	Louis Désiré, Louis Désiré, Duane Schuler	Christine Brewer, Paul Groves, Paul Groves, Wayne Tigges
2010	Madame Butterfly	Giacomo Puccini	Italian	1904	Antony Walker	Lee Blakeley	Jean-Marc Puissant, Brigitte Reiffenstuel, Rick Fisher	Kelly Kaduce, Brandon Jovanovich, Elizabeth DeShong, James Westman
2010	The Magic Flute	Wolfgang Amadeus Mozart	German	1791	Lawrences Renes	Tim Albery	Tobias Hoheisel, Tobias Hoheisel, Jennifer Tipton	Charles Castronovo, Ekaterina Siurina, Erin Morley / Audrey Elizabeth Luna, Joshua Hopkins, Andrea Silvestrelli
2010	The Tales of Hoffmann	Jacques Offenbach	French	1881	Stephen Lord	Christopher Alden	Allen Moyer, Constance Hoffman, Pat Collins	Erin Wall, Kate Lindsey, Paul Groves, Wayne Tigges
2010	Life is a Dream	Lewis Spratlan	English	2010	Leonard Slatkin	Kevin Newbury	David Korins, Jessica Jahn, Japhy Weideman	Roger Honeywell, John Cheek, James Maddalena, Ellie Dehn
2010	Albert Herring	Richard Strauss	German	1947	Andrew Davis	Paul Curran	Kevin Knight, Kevin Knight, Rick Fisher	Alek Shrader, Kate Lindsey, Celena Shafer, Christine Brewer, Joshua Hopkins
2011	Faust	Charles Gounod	French	1859	Frédéric Chaslin	Stephen Lawless	Benoit Dugardyn, Susan Wilmington, Pat Collins	Bryan Hymel, Mark S. Doss, Ailyn Pérez, Jamie Barton, Jennifer Holloway, Christopher Magiera
2011	La bohème	Giacomo Puccini	Italian	1859	Leonardo Vordoni	Paul Curran	Kevin Knight, Kevin Knight, Rick Fisher	Ana María Martínez, David Lomeli, Heidi Stober, Corey McKern, Christian Van Horn
2011	Griselda	Antonio Vivaldi	Italian	1735	Grant Gershon	Peter Sellars	Gronk, Dunya Ramicova, James F. Ingalls	Isabel Leonard; Meredith Arwady, Paul Groves, David Daniels
2011	The Last Savage	Gian Carlo Menotti	English	1964	George Manahan	Ned Canty	Allen Moyer, Allen Moyrer, Rick Fisher	Kevin Burdette, Jennifer Zetlan, Anna Christy, Jamie Barton, Daniel Okulitch
2011	Wozzeck	Alban Berg	German	1931	David Robertson	Daniel Slater	Robert I. Hopkins, Robert I. Hopkins, Rick Fisher	Richard Paul Fink, Eric Owens, Nicola Beller Carbone, Patricia Risley
2012	Tosca	Giacomo Puccini	Italian	1900	Frédéric Chaslin	Stephen Barlow	Yannis Thavoris, Yannis Thavoris, Duane Schuler	Amanda Eschalez, Raymond Aceto/ Thomas Hampson, Brian Jagde
2012	The Pearl Fishers	Georges Bizet	French	1863	Emmanuel Valaume	Lee Blakeley	Jean-Marc Pruissant, Brigitte Reiffenstuel, Rick Fisher	Nicole Cabell, Eric Cutler, Christopher Magiera, Wayne Tigges
2012	Maometto II	Gioachino Rossini	Italian	1820	Frédéric Chaslin	David Alden	Jon Morrell, Jon Morelli, Peggy Hickey	Luca Pisaroni, Leah Crocetto, Patricia Bardon, Bruce Sledge
2012	King Roger	Karol Szymanowski	Polish	1926	Evan Rogister	Stephen Wadsworth	Stephen Lynch, Ann Hould-Ward, Duane Schuler	Mariusz Kwiecień, Erin Morley, William Burden, Dennis Petersen, Raymond Aceto
2012	Arabella	Richard Strauss	German	1934	Andrew Davis	Tim Albery	Tobias Hoheisel, Tobias Hoheisel, David Finn	Erin Wall, Heidi Stober, Mark Delavan, Dale Travis
2013	The Grand Duchess of Gerolstein	Jacques Offenbach	French	1867	Emmanuel Villaume	Lee Blakeley	Adrian Linford, Jo van Schuppen, Rick Fisher	Susan Graham, Paul Appleby, Kevin Burdette, Ana Matanovič, Jonathan Michie, Aaron Pegram
2013	The Marriage of Figaro	Wolfgang Amadeus Mozart	Italian	1786	John Nelson	Bruce Donnell /orig: Jonathan Kent	Paul Brown, Paul Brown, Duane Schuler	Zachary Nelson, Lisette Oropesa, Susanna Phillips, Emily Fons, Daniel Okulitch
2013	La donna del lago	Gioachino Rossini	Italian	1819	Stephen Lord	Paul Curran	Kevin Knight, Kevin Knight, Duane Schuler	Joyce DiDonato, Lawrence Brownlee, Marianna Pizzolato, Wayne Tigges, René Barbera
2013	La traviata	Giuseppe Verdi	Italian	1853	Leo Hussain	Laurent Pelly	Chantal Thomas, Laurent Pelly, Duane Schuler	Brenda Rae, Michael Fabiano, Roland Wood, Dale Travis
2013	Oscar	Theodore Morrison	English	2013	Evan Rogister	Kevin Newbury	David Korins, David C. Woolard, Rick Fisher	David Daniels, Heidi Stober, William Burden, Dwayne Croft
2014	Carmen	Georges Bizet	French	1874	Rory Macdonald	Stephen Lawless	Benoit Dugardyn; Jorge Jara; Pat Collins	Daniela Mack / Ana María Martínez; Roberto De Biasio, Joyce El-Khoury
2014	Don Pasquale	Donizetti	Italian	1843	Corrado Rovaris	Laurent Pelly	Laurent Pelly; Chantal Thomas; Duane Schuler	Andrew Shore, Brenda Rae, Shelly Jackson, Alek Shrader
2014	Fidelio	Ludwig van Beethoven	German	1804	Harry Bicket	Stephen Wadsworth	Charlie Corcoran, Camille Assaf, Duane Schuler	Paul Groves, Alex Penda, Greer Grimsley, Manfred Hemm
2014	The Impresario	Wolfgang Amadeus Mozart	English	1786	Kenneth Montgomery	Michael Gieleta	James Macnamara; Fabio Toblini; Christopher Akerlind	Erin Morley, Brenda Rae, Bruce Sledge, Anthony Michaels-Moore
2014	The Nightingale	Igor Stravinsky	Russian	1914	Kenneth Montgomery	Michael Gieleta	James Macnamara, Fabio Toblini, Christopher Akerlind	Erin Morley, Brenda Rae, Bruce Sledge, Anthony Michaels-Moore
2014	Dr. Sun Yat-sen	Huang Ruo	Mandarin Chinese	2012	Carolyn Kuan	James Robinson	Allen Moyer, James Schuette, Christopher Akerlind	Joseph Dennis, Corinne Winters, MaryAnn McCormick, Don-Jian Gong, Chen Ye Yuan
2015	La fille du régiment	Gaetano Donizetti	French	1840	Speranza Scappucci	Ned Canty	Allen Moyer	Anna Christy, Judith Christin, Alek Shrader, Kevin Burdette
2015	Rigoletto	Giuseppe Verdi	Italian	1851	Jader Bignamini	Lee Blakeley	Adrian Linford	Quinn Kelsey, Bruce Sledge, Georgia Jarman, Nicole Piccolomini
2015	La finta giardiniera	Wolfgang Amadeus Mozart	Italian	1775				Heidi Stober, Susanna Phillips, Joel Prieto, Joshua Hopkins, Cecelia Hall
2015	Salome	Richard Strauss	German	1905	David Robertson	Daniel Slater	Leslie Travers	Alex Penda, Robert Brubaker, Ryan McKinny, Michaela Martens
2015	Cold Mountain	Jennifer Higdon	English	2015	Miguel Harth-Bedoya	Leonard Foglia	Robert Brill, David C. Woolard, Elaine J. McCarthy	Isabel Leonard, Nathan Gunn, Emily Fons, Jay Hunter Morris, Kevin Burdette, Anthony Michaels-Moore
2016	La fanciulla del West	Giacomo Puccini	Italian	1910	Emmanuel Villaume	Richard Jones	Nicky Gillibrand, Mimi Jordan Sherin	Patricia Racette, Gwyn Hughes Jones, Mark Delavan
2016	Don Giovanni	Wolfgang Amadeus Mozart	Italian	1787	John Nelson	Ron Daniels	Riccardo Hernandez, Emily Rebholz, Marcus Doshi	Daniel Okulitch, Leah Crocetto, Keri Algema, Rihan Lois, Edgaras Montvidas, Kyle Ketelsen
2016	Roméo et Juliette	Charles Gounod	French	1859	Harry Bicket	Stephen Lawless	Ashley Martin-Davis, Mimi Jordan Sherin	Stephen Costello, Ailyn Pérez, Emily Fons, Elliot Madore, Raymond Aceto
2016	Capriccio	Richard Strauss	German	1942	Leo Hussain	Tim Albery	Tobias Hoheisel, Malcolm Rippeth	Susan Graham, Amanda Majeski, Craig Verm, Ben Bliss, Joshua Hopkins
2016	Vanessa	Samuel Barber	English	1958	Leonard Slatkin	James Robinson	Allen Moyer, James Schuette, Christopher Akerlind	James Morris, Erin Wall, Virginie Verrez, Zach Borichevsky, Helene Schneiderman
2017	Die Fledermaus	Johann Strauss II	German	1874	Nicholas Carter	Ned Canty	Allen Moyer, Christianne Myers, Duane Schuler	Susan Graham, Paula Murrihy, Kurt Streit, Devon Guthrie, David Goversten, Dimitry Pittas
2017	Lucia di Lammermoor	Gaetano Donizetti	Italian	1835	Corrado Rovaris	Ron Daniels	Riccardo Hernandez, Emily Rebholz, Peter Nigrini	Brenda Rae, Mario Chang, Zachary Nelson, Christian Van Horn
2017	Alcina	George Frideric Handel	Italian	1728	Harry Bicket	David Alden	Gideon Davey, Malcolm Rippeth,	Elza van den Heever, Anna Christy, Paula Murrihy, Daniela Mack, Alek Shrader, Christian Van Horn, Jacquelyn Stucker
2017	The Golden Cockerel	Nikolai Rimsky-Korsakov	Russian	1834	Emmanuel Villaume	Paul Curran	Gary Mccann, Paul HackenMueller	Venera Gimadieva, Tim Mix, Barry Banks, Kevin Burdette, Meredith Arwady
2017	The (R)evolution of Steve Jobs	Mason Bates	English	2017	Michael Christie	Kevin Newbury	Vita Tzykun, Paul Carey	Edward Parks, Sasha Cooke, Wei Wu, Kelly Markgraf, Garrett Sorenson
2018	Candide	Leonard Bernstein	English	1956	Harry Bicket	Laurent Pelly	Chantal Thomas, Duane Schuler	Brenda Rae, Alek Shrader, Kevin Burdette
2018	Madame Butterfly	Giacomo Puccini	Italian	1904	John Fiore	Matthew Ozawa	Jean-Marc Puissant, Bridgitte Reiffenstuel , Rick Fisher	Ana María Martínez, Kelly Kaduce, A.J. Glueckert, Joshua Guerrero
2018	Doctor Atomic	John Adams	English	2005	Matthew Aucoin	Peter Sellars	David Gropman, Gabriel Berry , Emily Johnshon	Ryan Mickinny, Julia Bullock Kitty, Ben Bliss, Meredith Arway Pasqualita, Daniel Okulitch
2018	The Italian Girl in Algiers	Gioachino Rossini	Italian	1813	Corrado Rovaris	Shawna Lucey	Robert Innes Hopkins, David C. Woolard, Duane Schuler	Daniela Mack, Jack Swanson, Scott Conner, Suzanne Hendrix Zulma
2018	Ariadne auf Naxos	Richard Strauss	German	1916	James Gaffigan	Time Albery	Tobias Hoheisel, Thomas Hase	Amanda Echalaz, Bruce Sledge, Liv Redpath, Amanda Majeski, Kevin Burdette
2019	La bohème	Giacomo Puccini	Italian	1859	Jader Bignamini	Mary Birnbaum	Grace Laubacher, Camellia Koo, Anshuman Bhatia	Vanessa Vasquez, Gabriella Reyes, Mario Chang, Zachery Nelson, Will Liverman, Soloman Howard
2019	Così fan tutte	Wolfgang Amadeus Mozart	Italian	1790	Harry Bicket	R. B. Schlather	Paul Tate Depoo, Terese Wadden, Jax Messenger	Amanda Majeski, Emily D'Angelo, Tracy Dahl, Ben Bliss, Jarrett Ott, Rod Gilfry
2019	The Pearl Fishers	Georges Bizet	French	1863	Timothy Myers	Shawna Lucey	Jean-Marc Pruissant, Brigitte Reiffenstuel, Rick Fisher	Corinne Winters, Ilker Arayurek, Anthony Clack Evans, Robert Pomakov
2019	Jenůfa	Leoš Janáček	Czech	1904	Johannes Debus	David Alden	Charles Edwards, Jon Morrell, Duane Schuler	Laura Wilde, Patricia Racette, Susanne Mentzer, Alexander Lewis, Laca Klemen, Richard Trey Smagur
2019	The Thirteenth Child	Poul Ruders	English	2019	Paul Daniel	Darko Tresnjak	Alexander Dodge, Rita Ryack, York Kennedy	Jessica E. Jones, Tamara Mumford, Joshua Dennis, Bardley Garvin, David Leigh
2020	The Barber of Seville	Gioachino Rossini	Italian	1816	-	-	-	Cancelled
2020	The Magic Flute	Wolfgang Amadeus Mozart	German	1791	-	-	-	Cancelled
2020	Rusalka	Antonín Dvořák	Czech	1901	-	-	-	Cancelled
2020	Tristan und Isolde	Richard Wagner	German	1865	-	-	-	Cancelled
2020	M. Butterfly	Huang Ruo	English	2020	-	-	-	Cancelled
2021	The Marriage of Figaro	Wolfgang Amadeus Mozart	Italian	1786	Harry Bicket	Laurie Feldman	Chantal Thomas	Nicholas Brownlee, Ting Fang, Patrick Carfizzi, Susanne Mentzer, Megan Marino, Samual Dale Johnson
2021	Lord of the Cries	John Corigliano	English	2021	Johannes Debus	James Darrah	Chrisi Karvonides-Dushenko	Anthony Roth Costanzo, Kevin Burdette, Leah Brzyski, Rachel Blaustein, Susanna Phillips
2021	Eugene Onegin	Pyotr Ilyich Tchaikovsky	Russian	1879	Nicholas Carter	Alessandro Talevi	Gary Mccann	Sara Jakubiak, Avery Ameraeu, Lucas Meachem, Dovlet Nurgeldiyev
2021	A Midsummer Night's Dream	Benjamin Britten	English	1960	Harry Bicket	Netia Jones	D.M.Wood	Erin Morley, Kevin Burdette, Nicholas Brownlee, Brenton Ryan, Reed Luplau
2022	Carmen	Georges Bizet	French	1874	Harry Bicket	Mariame Clement	Julia Hansen	Isabel Leonard, Bryan Hymel, Michael Fabiano, Michael Sumuel, Sylvia DEramo, David Crawford
2022	Tristan und Isolde	Richard Wagner	German	1865	James Gaffigan	Zack Winokur	Lisenka Heijboer Castanon	Simon O'Neill, Tamara Wilson, Jamie Barton, Nicholas Brownlee, Eric Owens, David Leigh
2022	The Barber of Seville	Gioachino Rossini	Italian	1816	Ivan Lopez-Reynoso	Stephen Barlow	Andrew Edwards	Emily Fons, Jack Swanson, Joshua Hopkins, Kevin Burdette, Ryan Speedo Green
2022	Falstaff	Giuseppe Verdi	Italian	1893	Paul Daniel	David McVicar	Lizzie Powell	Quinn Kelsey, Alexandra loBianco, Roland Wood, Elena Villalon, Eric Ferring, Ann Quintero
2022	M. Butterfly	Huang Ruo	English	2020	Carolyn Kuan	James Robinson	Kangmin Justin Kim	Kangmin Justin Kim, Mark Stone, Hongni Wu, Kevin Burdette, Joshua Dennis
2023	Tosca	Giacomo Puccini	Italian	1900	John Fiore	Keith Warner	Ashley Martin-Davis, Allen Hahn	Reginald Smith, Leah Hawkins; Freddie De Tommaso, Blake Denson
2023	Der fliegende Holländer	Richard Wagner	German	1843	Thomas Guggeis	David Alden	Paul Steinberg	Nicholas Brownles, Elza van den Heever, Chad Shelton, Morris Robinson, Bill Bruley, Gretchen Krupp
2023	Pelléas et Mélisande	Claude Debussy	French	1902	Harry Bicket	Netia Jones	Netia Jones	Zachary Nelson, Huw Montague Rendall, Samantha Hankey, Raymond Aceto, Bill Brady, Susan Graham
2023	Rusalka	Antonín Dvořák	Czech	1901	Lidiya Yankovskaya	David Pountney	Leslie Travers	Ailyn Perez, Robert Watson, James Creswell, Raehann Bryce-Davis, Mary Elizabeth Williams, Llanah Lobel-Torres
2023	L'Orfeo	Claudio Monteverdi, Nico Muhly	Czech	1607	Harry Bicket	Yuval Sharon	Hana Kim	Rolando Villazon, Paula Murrihy, Lucy Evans, Lauren Snouffer, Amber Norelai, James Creswell
2024	La traviata	Giuseppe Verdi	Italian	1853	Corrado Rovaris	Louisa Muller	Christopher Oram, Marcus Doshi	Mane Galoyan, Bekhzon Davronov, Alfredo Daza, Kaylee Nichols, Garrett Evers
2024	Don Giovanni	Wolfgang Amadeus Mozart	Italian	1787	Harry Bicket	Stephen Barlow	Yannis Thavoris, Christopher Akerlind	Ryan Speedo Green, Rachel Fitzgerald, Rachel Willis-Sørensen, Racheal Wilson, David Portillo, Nicholas Newton, Liv Redpath
2024	The Righteous	Gregory Spears	English	2024	Jordan de Souza	Kevin Newbury	Mimi Lien, Devario Simmons, Japhy Weideman	Michael Maybes, Elena Villalon, Jennifer Johnson Cano, Anthony Roth Costanzo, Greer Grimsley
2024	Der Rosenkavalier	Richard Strauss	German	1911	Karina Canellakis	Bruno Ravella	Gary McCann, Malcolm Rippeth	Rachel Willis-Sørensen, Mathew Rose, Ying Fang, Liv Redpath, Zachary Nelson
2024	The Elixir of Love	Gaetano Donizetti	Italian	1832	Roberto Kalb	Stephen Lawless	Ashley Martin-Davis, Ashley Martin-Davis, Thomas Hase	Yaritza Veliz, Jonah Hoskins, Luke Sutliff, Alfredo Daza, Cadie Bryan
2025	The Marriage of Figaro	Wolfgang Amadeus Mozart	Italian	1786	Harry Bicket	Laurent Pelly	Chantal Thomas, Jean-Jacques Delmotte, Duane Schuler	Florian Sempey, Marina Monzo, Riccardo Fassi, Liv Redpath, Hongni Wu, Maurizio Muraro
2025	La bohème	Giacomo Puccini	Italian	1859	Ivan Reynoso	James Robinson	Allen Moyer, Constance Hoffman, Duane Schuler	Long Long, Sylvia D'Eramo, Szymon Mechlinski, Emma Marhefka, Kevin Burdette
2025	Rigoletto	Giuseppe Verdi	Italian	1851	Carlo Montanaro	Julien Chavaz	Jamie Vartan, Jean-Jacques Delmotte, Rick Fisher	Michael Chioldi, Elena Villalon, Duke Kim, Stephano Park
2025	The Turn of the Screw	Benjamin Britten	English	1954	Gemma New	Louisa Muller	Christopher Oram, Malcolm Rippeth	Jacquelyn Stucker, Brendon Ryan Barrett, Jennifer Johnson Cano, Wendy Bryn Harmer
2025	Die Walküre	Richard Wagner	German	1870	James Gaffigan	Melly Still	Leslie Travers, Malcolm Rippeth	Tamara Wilson, Ryan Speedo Green, Jamez McCorkle, Vida Mikneviciute, Sarah Sturnino
2026	Madame Butterfly	Giacomo Puccini	Italian	1904	John Fiore	Melanie Bacaling	Jean-Marc Puissant, Brigitte Reiffenstuel, Rick Fisher	Karen Chia-ling Ho, Sun-Ly Pierce, Ya-Chung Huang, Stephen Costello, Jonathan Burton, Jarrett Ott, Le Bu
2026	The Magic Flute	Wolfgang Amadeus Mozart	English	1791	Harry Bicket	Christopher Luscombe	Simon Higlett, Phillip Rosenberg, Chris Fisher, Robert Perdziola	Josh Lovell, Joélle Harvey, Rainelle Krause, Alexander Köpeczi, Will Liverman, Spencer Hamlin, Le Bu
2026	Eugene Onegin	Pyotr Ilyich Tchaikovsky	Russian	1879	Keri-Lynn Wilson	Alessandro Talevi	Gary McCann, Rick Fisher	Elmina Hasan, Iván Ayón-Rivas, Olga Kulchynska, Mattia Olivieri, Alexander Köpeczi, Lindsay Ammann, Meridian Prall, Ya-Chung Huang
2026	Rodelinda	George Frideric Handel	Italian	1725	Harry Bicket	R.B. Schlather	Doey Lüthi, Masha Tsimring, R.B. Schlather, Jiaying Zhang	Lucy Crowe, Anthony Gregory, Hugh Cutting, Iestyn Davies, Meridian Prall, William Guanbo Su
2026	Lili Elbe	Tobias Picker	English	2023	Roberto Kalb	James Robinson	Allen Moyer, Marco Piemontese, Marcus Doshi, Greg Emetaz	Lucia Lucas, Sylvia D'Eramo, Josh Lovell, Lindsay Ammann, Andrew Harris
