= Ann Christy =

Ann Christy may refer to:

- Ann Christy (actress) (1905–1987), American actress
- Ann Christy (singer) (1945–1984), Belgian singer

== See also ==
- Anna Christy, American opera singer
- Anna Christie (disambiguation)
