= Carl Tanner (disambiguation) =

Carl Tanner is an operatic tenor.

Carl or Karl Tanner may also refer to:

- Carl Tanner, character in The Alphabet Killer
- Karl Tanner, character in Celia (film)
- Karl Tanner, character in season three in the television series Game of Thrones
