= Anna Christie (disambiguation) =

Anna Christie is a 1921 play by Eugene O'Neill.

Anna Christie may also refer to the adaptations:

- Anna Christie (1923 film), adapted by Bradley King and starring Blanche Sweet
- Anna Christie (1930 English-language film), adapted by Frances Marion, starring Greta Garbo
- Anna Christie (1930 German-language film), adapted by Walter Hasenclever and Frances Marion, starring Greta Garbo

== See also ==
- Anna Christy
