= Daniela Mack =

Argentine mezzo-soprano

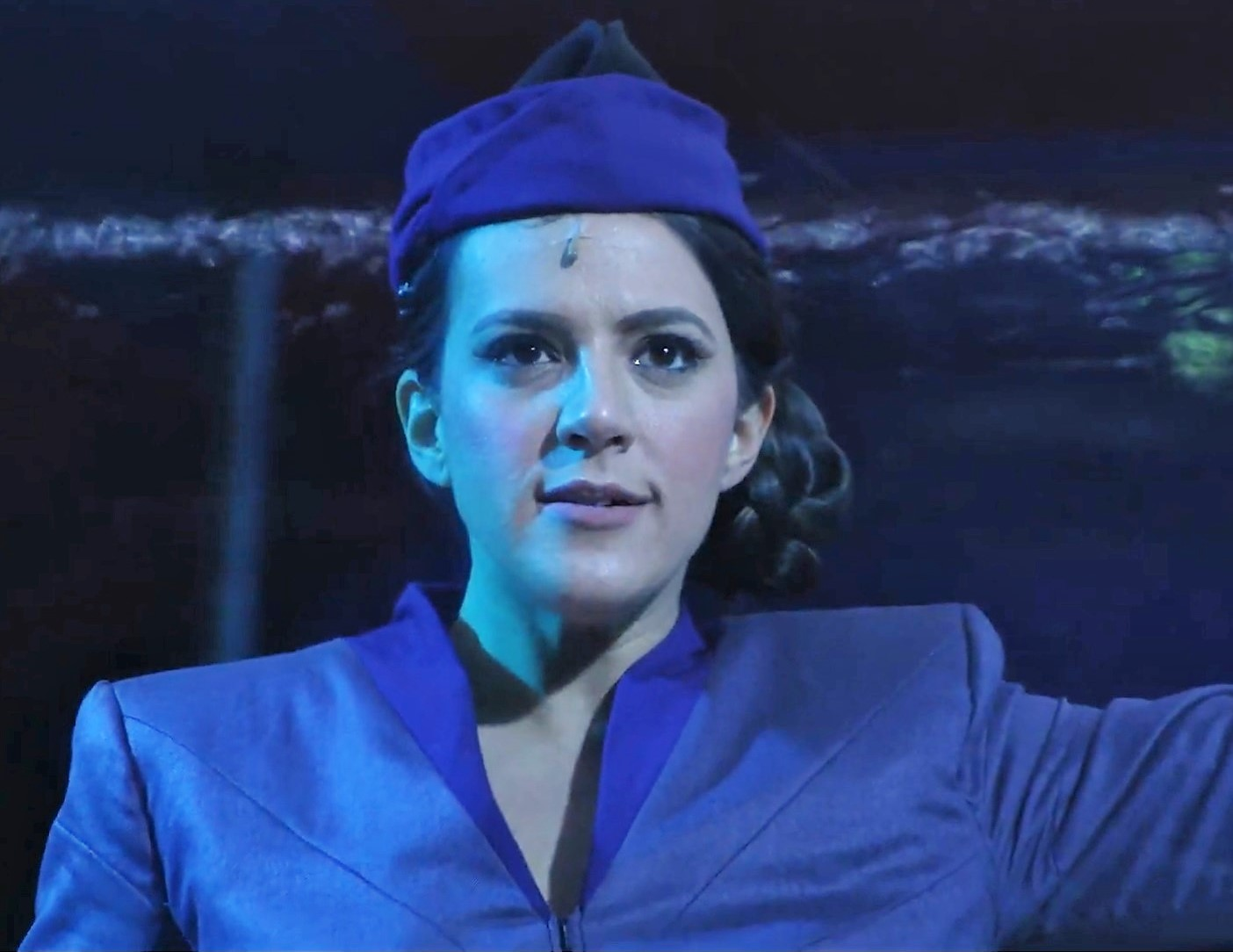
- Mack as the Drummer Girl in The Kaiser of Atlantis for the Atlanta Opera, 2022
- Born: April 6, 1982 (age 44)
- Citizenship: Argentina, United States
- Education: Louisiana State University
- Occupation: Mezzo-soprano
- Website: www.danielamack.com

Daniela Mack (born April 6, 1982) is an Argentine mezzo-soprano. She was a finalist in the 2013 BBC Cardiff Singer of the World Competition.

== Early life and education ==
Daniela Mack was born in Buenos Aires and studied at Louisiana State University. She trained at the Adler Fellowship Program, an artist-development program at San Francisco Opera.

== Career ==
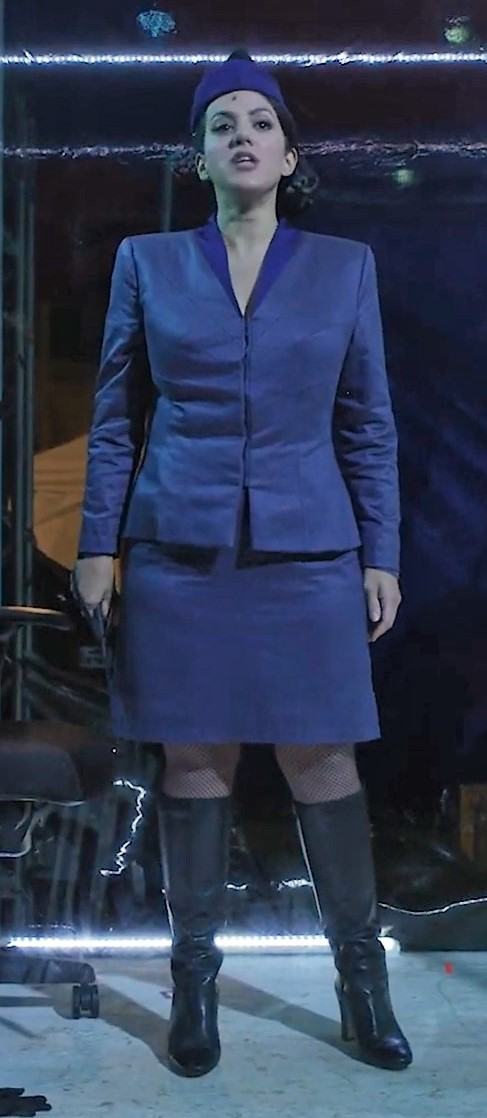
Mack in The Kaiser of Atlantis for the Atlanta Opera, 2022

Daniela Mack made her professional debut as Rosina in The Barber of Seville with Opera Cleveland in 2009 while still an Adler Fellow. She also debuted at the English National Opera as Sesto in Julius Caesar in 2012.

In 2016 Mack created the role of Jacqueline Kennedy in the world premiere of David T. Little’s opera JFK with Fort Worth Opera.

In 2017 Mack created the title role in the world premiere of Kevin Puts' opera Elizabeth Cree with Opera Philadelphia as a part of their O17 Festival.

In 2021, Mack performed the role of Rosina in an abridged English-language adaptation of The Barber of Seville for the San Francisco Opera, alongside her husband Alek Shrader. The production was held as an open-air, drive-in event at the Marin Center due to the COVID-19 pandemic.

Mack has sung at opera houses including the Royal Opera House, Washington National Opera, and Santa Fe Opera. In concert, she has performed with the Boston Symphony Orchestra and the Chicago Symphony Orchestra both under the direction of Charles Dutoit.

== Personal life ==
Mack is married to operatic tenor Alek Shrader.

== See also ==
- Lyric Opera Baltimore
- List of operas performed at the Santa Fe Opera
