= Celena Shafer =

American opera singer

Celena Shafer (born February 1975, Centerville, Utah) is an American soprano.

== Career ==
At age 17, Shafer won a vocal competition at the Utah State Fair, and was selected to sing with the Utah Symphony orchestra in their Salute to Youth concert. After graduating from Viewmont High School, she enrolled in the University of Utah, where she continued her vocal study. After graduation, she enrolled in the Santa Fe opera apprentice program, further developing her coloratura skills in roles as Marie (La Fille du Régiment) and Gilda (Rigoletto).

In 1999, Shafer won the Metropolitan Opera National Council of Auditions, Utah district. She is also the recipient of a 2000 Sara Tucker Study Grant from the Richard Tucker Foundation.

After a performance in Mozart's Mitridate, re di Ponto singing the role of Princess Ismene with the Santa Fe Opera in the summer of 2001, Shafer was the recipient of the 2002 Recognizing Individual Artistry Award, an honor given annually by the Thomas Foundation. The same year, she sang the role of Aithra in the New York concert performance of Strauss' Die ägyptische Helena, alongside Deborah Voigt, who had the title role. This performance was later released on CD.

During the 2004–05 season, she debuted with the New York Philharmonic in a performance of Handel's Messiah. In April 2005, she sang the title role of Esclarmonde at the Washington Concert Opera.

Other roles include Johanna Barker in Sweeney Todd, Tytania in A Midsummer Night's Dream, Nanetta in Falstaff, Hero in Berlioz's Beatrice and Benedict, Zerbinetta in a concert performance of Ariadne auf Naxos, Blonde in The Abduction from the Seraglio, Adele in Die Fledermaus, and Magnolia in Show Boat for a gala benefit for Carnegie Hall.
