= Serena Farnocchia =

Italian operatic soprano

Serena Farnocchia (born 29 May 1973) is an Italian operatic soprano.

== Life and career ==
Farnocchia was born in Pietrasanta, and raised in Camaiore. She studied singing with baritone Giampiero Mastromei and Giovanna Canetti. In 1994, she won various competitions in Italy, among which the one in Florence earned her the role of Grilletta in Haydn's opera Lo speziale, presented in July 1994 at the Bagni di Lucca Festival. She won the 1995 Luciano Pavarotti International Voice Competition in Philadelphia, leading to the title role in Lucia di Lammermoor presented at the Academy of Music in August 1996, which was participated by Pavarotti. In 1997 after entering the two-year Academy of La Scala, she made her debut in the role of Donna Anna in Mozart's Don Giovanni conducted by Riccardo Muti.

In 2002, she sang Elaisa in Mercandente's Il giuramento at Wexford Festival Opera. In August 2005, she appeared as Adalgisa in Bellini's Norma at the Finnish National Opera.
