= John Shaw (baritone) =

Australian operatic baritone

John William Shaw, AO OBE (12 October 1924 – 24 February 2003) was an Australian operatic baritone best known for his appearances at The Royal Opera, Covent Garden, where he spent 15 seasons.

== Life and career ==
Shaw was born in Newcastle, New South Wales, in 1924. Both his grandfathers were singers and he himself took an interest in singing at a young age, performing with his church choir and amateur musicals and concerts. In Melbourne he studied under Henri and Annie Portnoj and joined the Australian National Theatre Opera Company where he performed in dozens of small roles and gained stage experience.

In 1953, Shaw played the Secret Police Agent in the Australian debut of Menotti's The Consul and soon repeated the role at the Tivoli Theatre in Sydney. In 1955, the J.C. Williamson Italian Opera Company hired him to perform 13 major baritone roles during a tour of Australia and in the following year performed Don Giovanni and the Count in The Marriage of Figaro for the Elizabethan Theatre Trust, roles he would not repeat. With that company in 1957 he was to perform Iago in Verdi's Otello and Scarpia in Puccini's Tosca, with Joan Hammond as Tosca and Desdemona. This gave Shaw the opportunity to perform at Covent Garden. His Covent Garden debut came in January 1958 in the title role of Verdi's Rigoletto and he was soon to perform Amonasro in Verdi's Aida.

In 1967 he created the role of Smirnov in William Walton's The Bear.

Shaw spent 15 seasons at Covent Garden and was best known for his performances as Amonasro, Tonio, Ford, Iago, Telramund, and Scarpia. He toured all over Australia, Europe, and the United States. He died in Sydney in 2003, aged 78.

== Honours ==
John Shaw was appointed an Officer of the Order of the British Empire in 1977 on the recommendation of the Government of New South Wales. In 1986 he was appointed an Officer of the Order of Australia.
