= Saramae Endich =

American opera singer (1923–1969)

Saramae Endich (November 20, 1923 – June 12, 1969) was an American classical soprano who had an active performance career in concerts and operas during the 1950s and 1960s.

== Life and career ==
Born in Steubenville, Ohio, Endich was one of five daughters born to Abraham Endich. She began studying the piano as a young child and grew up singing at her synagogue. After graduating with a bachelor's degree in vocal performance from Ohio University, she moved to New York City to pursue further voice studies with Emmy Joseph and Winifred Cecil. She later studied with Boris Goldovsky at the Berkshire Music Center in 1957.

Endich made her professional singing debut in July 1957 at the Tanglewood Music Festival as the soprano soloist in Wolfgang Amadeus Mozart's Missa Solemnis with tenor John McCollum, the Boston Symphony Orchestra, and conductor Charles Munch. That same year she won second prize in the Metropolitan Opera Auditions of the Air. In 1958 she made her professional opera debut at the Santa Fe Opera (SFO) as Fiordiligi in Mozart's Così fan tutte under conductor Robert Baustian. She performed in several more SFO productions, including the roles of Alice Ford in Giuseppe Verdi's Falstaff (1958), Rosalinda in Johann Strauss II's Die Fledermaus (1959), Constanze in Die Entführung aus dem Serail (1959), the Virgin Mary in Arthur Honegger's Jeanne d'Arc au bûcher (1962), Donna Anna in Don Giovanni (1963), 'The Lady' in Paul Hindemith's Cardillac (1967), and Countess Almaviva in The Marriage of Figaro (1967).

Outside of Santa Fe, Endich was rarely seen in staged opera productions. She performed the role of Countess Almaviva with the New York City Opera in 1962 and 1963, and was seen as Marguerite in Charles Gounod's Faust with the Opera Society of Washington (now the Washington National Opera) in 1965. Her only international opera appearance was a critical success: a portrayal of the title role in Claudio Monteverdi's L'incoronazione di Poppea at the 1964 Glyndebourne Festival.

As a concert singer Endich was very active. She made numerous appearances with the Brooklyn Philharmonic under conductor Siegfried Landau during the late 1950s and 1960s. She was also heard in concerts with numerous American symphony orchestras, including the New York Philharmonic, the Philadelphia Orchestra, and the Cleveland Orchestra among others. On 19 January 1964 she was the soprano soloist in Mozart's Requiem for the Solemn Requiem Mass honouring the death of President John F. Kennedy in Boston's Cathedral of the Holy Cross. She also was the soloist in Verdi's Messa da Requiem under conductor Leonard Bernstein for the funeral of Robert F. Kennedy in 1968. She recorded Francis Poulenc's Gloria with conductor Robert Shaw and the Robert Shaw Chorale, and recorded works by the Vienesse masters with conductor Andre Kostelanetz. She can also be heard as both Solomon's Queen and the First Harlot on a complete 1967 recording of George Frideric Handel's Solomon made by the Handel Society of New York with the Vienna Volksoper Orchestra for RCA.

In 1969, at the age of 45, Miss Endich was found dead in her apartment at the Clifton Hotel in New York City. The autopsy gave the cause of death as visceral congestion. At the time of her death she was just about to start rehearsals for the role of Madame Euterpova in Gian Carlo Menotti's Help, Help, the Globolinks! for that work’s United States premiere production in Santa Fe.
