= Andrew Földi =

American opera singer (1926–2007)

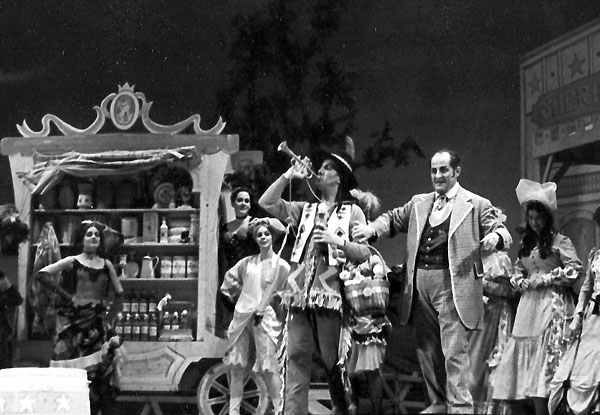
Andrew Foldi as "Dr. Dulcamara," and Bruce Cooper as his assistant "Cochise," in Act 1, Scene 2 of Cincinnati Opera's 1968 "Wild West" production of L'elisir d'amore directed by James de Blasis.

Andrew Foldi (Hungarian: Földi András; 20 July 1926 – 21 November 2007) was a Hungarian-American bass baritone and educator whose singing career spanned four decades.

== Biography ==
Andrew Foldi was born on 20 July 1926, in Budapest, Hungary. When he was an infant, his highly musical grandmother recognized his perfect pitch, as he was humming Don Giovanni in key before his first words. Foldi fled Hungary in 1939 with his father, and was raised in Chicago, Illinois and attended the University of Chicago, and studied voice with Martial Singher.

Foldi made his professional debut in 1954, as Biondello in Vittorio Giannini's The Taming of the Shrew in the first season of the Lyric Opera of Chicago; for his second professional performance, the young singer was cast as Doctor Grenvil in La traviata starring Maria Callas and Tito Gobbi. He was selected by John Crosby as one of the original 14 cast members in the inaugural 1957 season at the Santa Fe Opera, which included working under the baton of Igor Stravinsky in Oedipus Rex. Andrew Foldi was selected by intendant Herbert Graf as leading bass at the Zürich Opera in 1961. Foldi established himself as a character actor of the first rank in other opera houses throughout Europe and the U.S., among them La Scala, Wiener Staatsoper, Züricher Opernhaus, Glyndebourne Opera, Cincinnati Zoo Opera. He created the roles of Mr. Parker in Norman Dello Joio's Blood Moon at San Francisco Opera (1961) and John W. Diller in Armin Schibler's dance-burlesque Blackwood & Co. (Das Jubliämsbett) at Zürich Opera (1962).

He made the first of his eighty-five appearances at the Metropolitan Opera in 1975, as Alberich in Das Rheingold. During his years on the roster, Foldi appeared as Schigolch in the company premieres of Alban Berg's Lulu (directed by John Dexter, 1977, which was published on DVD in 2010) and Dansker in Benjamin Britten's Billy Budd (1978) as well as playing Dr. Bartolo in the premiere of Günther Rennert's Met staging of Le Nozze di Figaro (1975). By the time his unforgettably seedy Schigolch shuffled through the Met premiere of Berg's opera, the role had become a career specialty for Foldi, who sang more than 100 performances of Lulu in San Francisco and Europe before his first New York Schigolch. Foldi continued to sing the role throughout the 1980s, with memorable appearances in Santa Fe (1980), Chicago (1987) and at the Met (1988). He was also well known for the comic part of the quack "snake oil" salesman, Dr. Dulcamara, in L'Elisir d'Amore by Gaetano Donizetti.

Foldi was also active as a teacher and as an author. In 1979, he joined the faculty of the Cleveland Institute of Music and went on to serve a decade-long tenure as the chairman and artistic director of its opera department. From 1991 until 1995, Foldi returned to Chicago's Lyric Opera as the director of the Lyric Opera Center for American Artists under director Ardis Krainik; he was succeeded by Richard Pearlman. In 1999, Leyerle published "Foldi's Opera: An Accident Waiting to Happen", a collection of humorous reminiscences.

He was first married to Leona with whom he had two biological children named Nancy S. Foldi and David Foldi. At the time of his death, he was married to Marta Justus and had two stepsons named Greg Hancock and Chris Hancock. He died on 21 November 2007, aged
