= Amanda Majeski =

American operatic soprano (born 1984)

- Born: 1984 (age 40–41)
- Education: Bienen School of Music; Curtis Institute of Music; Carmel Catholic High School
- Occupation: Operatic soprano
- Website: www.amandamajeski.com

Amanda Majeski (October 20, 1984) is an American operatic soprano.

== Early life ==
Amanda Majeski was born in Gurnee, Illinois, near Chicago. She studied ballet and learned how to play the piano and the cello as a child.

Majeski attended Carmel Catholic High School in Mundelein, Illinois. She graduated from the Bienen School of Music at Northwestern University and the Curtis Institute of Music in Philadelphia. She was trained further at the Patrick G. and Shirley W. Ryan Opera Center, an artist-development program at the Lyric Opera of Chicago; the Merola Opera Program at the San Francisco Opera; the Gerdine Young Artist Program at Opera Theatre of Saint Louis; and the Steans Institute at the Ravinia Festival.

== Career ==
Majeski started her career at the Chicago Opera Theater, where she performed the role of Vitellia in Mozart's La Clemenza di Tito in 2009. She subsequently performed the same role in Madrid, Spain, Dresden, Germany, the Lyric Opera of Chicago (2014), and the Paris Opera (2017). Meanwhile, she performed as Countess Almaviva in Mozart's Le Nozze di Figaro at the Metropolitan Opera (2014), the Lyric Opera of Chicago (2015), Teatro Campoamor (2015), and the Washington National Opera (2016). In 2016 she portrayed The Marschallin in Strauss' Der Rosenkavalier at the Lyric Opera of Chicago.

Majeski performed in Richard Wagner's Die Meistersinger von Nürnberg at the 2016 Glyndebourne Festival Opera. In 2018 she was the soprano soloist in Benjamin Britten's War Requiem with the Colorado Symphony and performed the role of the Composer in Richard Strauss' Ariadne auf Naxos at the Santa Fe Opera. In 2019 she was scheduled to make her debut at the Royal Opera House in London in the title role of Janáček’s Kát’a Kabanová. This concert performance took place in January 2023. She was scheduled to repeat this role for Semperoper in Dresden, Germany in 2024.
