= Paul Franke (tenor) =

American opera singer

Paul Walter Franke (December 23, 1917, Boston – July 21, 2011, Queens) was an American operatic tenor who specialized in the comprimario repertoire. He had a very long association with the Metropolitan Opera, where he performed nearly 2000 times from 1948 to 1987. He also sang in the Santa Fe Opera house.

His discography includes two recordings conducted by Renato Cellini, on RCA: Il trovatore (with Jussi Björling, Zinka Milanov, Fedora Barbieri, and Leonard Warren, 1952) and Pagliacci (with Björling, Victoria de los Ángeles, Warren, and Robert Merrill, 1953). On DVD, he is seen in the Met's 1980 Un ballo in maschera, opposite Katia Ricciarelli, Judith Blegen, Bianca Berini, Luciano Pavarotti, and Louis Quilico.
