= Kevin Langan =

American operatic bass (born 1955)

Kevin Langan (born April 1, 1955) is an American operatic bass.

== Early life ==
Langan was born in New York on April 1, 1955. He studied voice with Margaret Harshaw at Indiana University School of Music. He went on to win auditions with the Metropolitan Opera, San Francisco Opera, and Opera America. In 1983, Langan won the Richard Tucker Music Foundation Grant Award.

According to Langan, it was seeing The Beatles perform on TV in 1964 on The Ed Sullivan Show that made him want to pursue a career in opera. Years later, in an April 2017 interview with LA Opus, Langan recalled telling the story during a rehearsal break at Carnegie Hall to Paul McCartney, who laughed and replied: "[That's the first time] The Beatles inspired someone to go into opera!"

Sponsored by Elisabeth Schwarzkopf and Walter Legge, Langan gave his first recital at Wigmore Hall in 1979. He gave his New York City recital debut at Carnegie Hall on April 4, 1984. The New York Times wrote: "Mr. Langan, a true basso in the classic sense of the word, is of an all-but-vanished breed."

In a 2017 interview for BroadwayWorld, Langan recalls when he was a sophomore at New England Conservatory in 1974 and Met opera singer Maria Callas told him: "I will give you one piece of advice. People will tell you constantly how to sing. Make it louder, softer, faster, slower." She then placed her hand over his heart and said: "Always remain true to this when you sing no matter what they tell you!"

== Career ==
Langan has performed with opera singers and conductors including Luciano Pavarotti, Plácido Domingo, Marilyn Horne, Sherrill Milnes and Seiji Ozawa, and has gained the reputation of achieving one of the longest and most productive singing careers on the opera stage in the last couple decades. He became the first artist to give 300 performances in 43 productions with the San Francisco Opera; and 19 productions with the San Diego Opera. Over all, Langan has performed in over 80 roles throughout 1300-plus performances, in 38 years.

Langan starred in the premiere of the opera Emmeline by American composer Tobias Picker in 1996 as Henry Mosher (Emmeline's Father).

He is married to American operatic soprano, Sally Wolf.

Langan was the last protégé of the EMI record producer Walter Legge.

== Reviews ==
Langan's portrayals and performances have been received with great acclaim by critics and audiences alike.

Tim Page of The New York Times wrote of Langan's voice that it intoned a "deep, toffee-smooth" sound with "convincing interpretive abilities".

The magazine Opera wrote that Langan's delivery of Mozart's "La vendetta" from The Marriage of Figaro under the direction of Nikolaus Harnoncourt (the recording of which was nominated for a Grammy Award on the Teldec label) was "absolutely revelatory ... with a vocal sheen that [has] never heard before".

David Laviska of musicalcriticism.com wrote of Langan's performance of Friar Laurence in Gounod's Roméo et Juliette that he delivered it all in a "vibrant, ringing tone, polished phrasing, incisive diction, and convincing, unfussy acting" package.

== Filmography ==
1994	Turandot	Timur	San Francisco Opera, live performance	Arthaus Music
1990	Orlando furioso	Astolfo	San Francisco Opera, live performance	Arthaus Music
1981	Aida	King of Egypt	San Francisco Opera, live performance	Kultur
1981	Samson et Dalila	Un vieillard hébreu	San Francisco Opera, live performance	Kultur
2009	The Cunning Little Vixen	Parson, Badger	Maggio Musicale Fiorentino, live performance	Arthaus Music

== Discography ==
Year	Title	Role	Notes	Label
1994	The Marriage of Figaro	Antonio	Royal Concertgebouw Orchestra; Nikolaus Harnoncourt, conductor	Teldec
1998	Emmeline	Henry Mosher	Santa Fe Opera; George Manahan, conductor	Albany Records
