= Helen Vanni =

American opera singer (1924–2023)

- Born: Helen Spaeth; 30 January 1924; Davenport, Iowa, U.S.
- Died: 5 March 2023 (aged 99); Albuquerque, New Mexico, U.S.
- Education: St. Catherine University
- Occupation: Opera singer

Helen Vanni (née Spaeth; January 30, 1924 – March 5, 2023) was an American opera singer who performed mezzo-soprano and soprano roles.

== Early life ==
Helen Spaeth was born on January 30, 1924, to German parents, in Davenport, Iowa, where she studied piano and voice before attending college at St. Catherine University in Saint Paul, Minnesota.

== Career ==
Vanni made her debut at the Metropolitan Opera in 1956 in the role of the page in Rigoletto, and she appeared in over 400 performances at the Met from 1956 to 1970. She shared the stage with notable singers such as Leontyne Price, Renata Tebaldi, Maria Callas, Jussi Björling, Richard Tucker, Victoria de los Ángeles, and Licia Albanese.

In addition to supporting roles, she appeared in leading and featured roles at the Met including Suzuki in Madama Butterfly, Rosina in Il Barbiere di Siviglia, Dorabella in Cosi fan tutte (opposite Leontyne Price as Fiordiligi), Donna Elvira in Don Giovanni, and as the Marschallin in Der Rosenkavalier.

One of Vanni’s more unusual experiences onstage at the Met was the performance of Madama Butterfly on December 5, 1961, when famed diva Galina Vishnevskaya sang one performance as Cio-Cio-San in Russian while everyone else in the cast sang in Italian.

Vanni performed regularly with the Santa Fe Opera from 1960 through 1977. In her debut Santa Fe Opera season she sang three leading roles: Cherubino in The Marriage of Figaro, the title role in Rossini's La Cenerentola, and Tessa in The Gondoliers.

Vanni’s appearances at the Santa Fe Opera spanned 14 seasons, from 1960 to 1976, where she sang 18 different roles in 28 productions. Her performance history there included both leading mezzo and soprano roles in Strauss’s Der Rosenkavalier (Octavian in 1961 and the Marschallin in 1968) and The Marriage of Figaro (Cherubino in 1960, 1961, 1965, and 1967 and the Countess in 1970, 1973, and 1976). She also sang the leading soprano role of Alice Ford in Falstaff in Santa Fe in 1975.

Roles at the San Francisco Opera included the title role in the rarely performed Mignon by Ambroise Thomas. Notably, she sang the title role in Ariadne auf Naxos in 23 performances at the Glyndebourne Festival Opera in 1971–72. She also sang the Countess in Capriccio for the New York City Opera in 1969.

In addition to her performing career, she taught at the Manhattan School of Music and the Cleveland Institute of Music, where she was head of the voice faculty. Notable recordings include music of Arnold Schoenberg with pianist Glenn Gould; Anton Bruckner's Symphony No. 5 with the Philadelphia Orchestra conducted by Eugene Ormandy; and Mendelssohn's incidental music to A Midsummer Night's Dream with the Boston Symphony Orchestra conducted by Erich Leinsdorf.

== Personal life and death ==
Helen Vanni was married to Mario Vanni, who died in 2015. They had three children. Vanni and her family lived in New Jersey until moving to Santa Fe full-time after her retirement from the stage in 1977. Vanni died on March 5, 2023, at the age of 99.
