= Evelyn Mandac =

American opera singer

Evelyn Mandac (born August 16, 1945 in Malaybalay) is a soprano opera singer, orchestra soloist, recitalist and voice teacher from the Philippines. She is based in New York City. She's also listed in "Who's Who in Music and Musicians."

== Life and career ==
A native of the Philippines, Mandac became known known both for the beauty of her voice and her dramatic prowess on stage. At the University of the Philippines, she studied under Lourdes Corrales Razon and Aurelio Estanislao. Estanislao would teach her the Filipino Kundiman and art songs in French, Italian, German, and Spanish. She performed at a soiree where the US Ambassador to the Philippines, William E. Stevenson, and his cultural attache, Edward Mattos, were present. Stevenson was former President of Oberlin and Mattos was a former member of the Conservatory faculty. Through these connections, she received a Fulbright scholarship to attend Oberlin College. Consequently, she also received a Rockefeller Scholarship to The Juilliard School. It was at Juilliard where she discovered opera.

In 1966, she won the Metropolitan Opera National Council Auditions which marked the beginning of her career. She was the first, and still is the only, Filipina to sing major roles at the Metropolitan Opera. Moreover, only the fourth Asian principal in its history but the first to sing a non-Asian lead role there in 1975. She later earned critical acclaim for her many portrayals of lead opera heroines in major opera houses and festivals worldwide including San Francisco Opera, Washington National Opera, Houston Opera, Santa Fe Opera, Seattle Opera, Baltimore Opera, Geneva Opera, Netherlands Opera, Teatro dell’opera di Roma, The Théâtre du Capitole de Toulouse, Strasbourg Opera House, Lyon Opera, Ravinia Festival in Chicago, the Robin Hood Dell in Philadelphia, the Salzburg Music Festival, the Promenade Concert at the Royal Albert Hall, and the Glyndebourne Music Festival.

Mandac's extensive repertoire includes Ines (L'Africaine), which she performed alongside Placido Domingo and Shirley Verrett at the San Francisco Opera for which there is a live performance recording; Liu (Turandot) with Birgit Nilsson at Seattle Opera and San Antonio Opera; Almirena in the American premiere of Handel's Rinaldo at the Houston Grand Opera with Marilyn Horne; Lauretta (Gianni Schichi), Zerlina (Don Giovanni) and Gretel (Hansel und Gretel) at the Metropolitan Opera; Mélisande (Pelléas et Mélisande) at the Santa Fe Opera and Teatro dell’opera di Roma; Sicle (L'Ormindo), Manon (Manon) at the Washington Opera, Mimi (La Boheme) at the Washington Opera and Seattle Opera; Anne Truelove (The Rake's Progress) in Washington DC at the Kennedy Center, Pamina (Die Zauberflöte) with Lyon Opera, Gilda (Rigoletto) at the Geneva Opera, Norina (Don Pasquale) at the Holland Opera Festival, Luise (Der Junge Lord) at the Dutch Opera, and Susannah (Le nozze di Figaro) and Despina (Cosi fan tutte) at the Glyndebourne Opera Festival.

Mandac performed in five American premieres: two at Juilliard (Jenny in The Mines of Sulphur by Rodney Bennett and She in Passaggio by Luciano Berio in New York which she then performed in Turino, Italy with the RAI Orchestra) and three professional ones (Sicle in L'Ormindo by Francesco Cavalli in Washington National Opera, Autonoe in Bassarids by Hans Werner Henze at Santa Fe Opera, and the first staged US production of Handel's Almirea in Rinaldo with Marilyn Horne). She also performed in two world professional premieres of operas written by Thomas Pasatieri inspired by both her voice and dramatic prowess: Ines in Ines de Castro at the Baltimore Opera and Berta in Black Widow at the Seattle Opera. According to Paul Hume of The Washington Post, “Mandac is a marvelously thrilling singer to watch and hear. Her voice is effortlessly and perfectly produced. Pasatieri wrote into the role many lines of special effect, drawing on her gifts for pianissimo high song, as well as real dramatic powers.”

Throughout her career, Mandac has performed as the soprano soloist with major Orchestras including the Boston Symphony Orchestra, Cleveland Orchestra, Philadelphia Orchestra, Corpus Christi Symphony, Minnesota and St. Paul Orchestras, Phoenix Symphony, San Antonio Symphony, and more. Her performances include Orff's Carmina Burana with the Boston Symphony Orchestra under the baton of Seiji Ozawa and the Mahler 2nd with the Philadelphia Orchestra under the baton of Eugene Ormandy. She has also performed under the batons of major names in opera including John Pritchard, Peter Maag, Jean Périsson, Emerson Buckley, Sixten Ehrling, Lawrence Foster, Herbert von Karajan, James Levine, Claudio Abbado, and Zubin Mehta and shared the stage with the likes of Sherill Milnes, Richard Tucker, Jenny Tourel, Frederica von Stade, James Morris, Kiri te Kanawa, Shirley Verrett, Placido Domingo, Marilyn Horne, and Birgit Nilsson. She has been directed by notable stage directors including Jean Pierre Ponnelle, Ian Strasfogel, Bodo Igesz, Christopher West (of Covent Garden), Tito Copabiano, Frans Boerlage, Frank Corsaro, Bliss Hebert, Fabrizio Melano, Peter Adler, Lotfi Mansouri, Glynn Ross, Gian Carlo Menotti, and a Peter Hall production.

Mandac now maintains a teaching studio in New York City where she passes on her experience and knowledge to her students.

== Recordings ==
- Carl Orff's Carmina Burana with the Boston Symphony Orchestra conducted by Seiji Ozawa under the RCA Label.
- Giacomo Meyerbeer's L'Africaine at the San Francisco Opera with Plácido Domingo and Shirley Verrett.
- Gustav Mahler's Symphony No. 2 with the Philadelphia Orchestra conducted by Eugene Ormandy.
- Josef Alexander's Songs for Eve with the Philadelphia Orchestra under the Seraphim label.

== Television ==
Mandac played the role of "Lisa" in Peter Herman Adler's 90-minute, English-language version of Tchaikovsky's Queen of Spades produced for National Educational Television, which aired on February 28, 1971.

== Teaching ==
Mandac has been teaching vocal technique and music interpretation since 1987. Her vocal technique is based on the principles of the bel canto technique, and incorporating ideas encouraged by yoga.

== See also ==
- Filipinos in the New York City metropolitan region
