= Ellen Shade =

American opera singer

Ellen Shade (born February 17, 1944, New York) is an American operatic soprano.

== Biography ==
Her repertoire includes the Kaiserin in Die Frau ohne Schatten, the Marschallin Der Rosenkavalier, Chrysothemis Elektra, Ariadne Ariadne auf Naxos, Arabella, Katya Kabanova, Aida, Desdemona Otello, Amelia Un ballo in Maschera, Amelia Simon Boccanegra, Sieglinde Die Walkure, Elsa Lohengrin, Elisabeth Tannhauser, Eva Die Meistersinger von Nurnberg. In Europe she has appeared at La Scala Milan, the Royal Opera House, Covent Garden, the Bastille and the Chatelet in Paris and in Vienna, Salzburg Festival, Berlin, Hamburg, Frankfurt [Article Reference], Stuttgart, Amsterdam, Brussels, Geneva and Athens. In North America she has performed with virtually all the major opera companies, including the Metropolitan Opera New York, Chicago, San Francisco, Los Angeles, Houston, Dallas, Seattle, Santa Fe, and the Canadian Opera in Toronto.

Conductors she has sung with include Claudio Abbado, Richard Armstrong (conductor), Sylvian Cambreling, Christoph von Dohnányi, Mark Elder, John Fiore, Michael Gielen, Carlo Maria Giulini, Erich Leinsdorf, Raymond Leppard, James Levine, John Pritchard (conductor), Mstislav Rostropovich, Georg Solti, Horst Stein and Christian Thielemann.

Her Saffi, in The Gypsy Baron film conducted by Kurt Eichhorn, is available on DVD. She began her career with the American Savoyards and in other Off-off-Broadway companies in the 1960s. In 1978 she created the part of Eve in Penderecki's Paradise Lost, at the Lyric Opera of Chicago.

Ms. Shade has appeared in leading roles in eight video productions such as Kaiserin in Die Frau ohne Schatten and Saffi in The Gypsy Baron. She has been a frequent clue in crossword puzzles, appearing in The New York Times, the Los Angeles Times, the International Herald Tribune, the Chicago Tribune, Delta Sky and United Airlines magazines.

As a concert singer, Shade has been a frequent soloist with the New York Philharmonic, the Chicago Symphony Orchestra, National Symphony Orchestra in Washington D.C., and the orchestras of Boston, Cleveland, Los Angeles, Minnesota, St. Louis, Pittsburg, and Philadelphia. In Europe, she has sung with the Berlin Philharmonic, Vienna Philharmonic, and the radio orchestras in Berlin, Frankfurt, Munich, Stuttgart, Baden-Baden, Helsinki, Rome, and Torino.

Shade is married to bass-trombonist Larry Benz and they make their home in Santa Fe, New Mexico.

== Sources ==
- Milwaukee Sentinel, March 24, 1977
- Charles Jahantz/Elizabeth Forbes, in The New Grove Dictionary of Opera, IV (1992), p. 338.
- Lyric Opera of Chicago, Paradise Lost, 1978 cast
- Warrack, John and West, Ewan, "Shade, Ellen" in The Concise Oxford Dictionary of Opera, Oxford University Press, 1996
