= Robert Trehy =

American operatic singer (1921–2009)

Robert F. Trehy (January 27, 1921 – November 22, 2009) was an American baritone who had an active career singing in operas, concerts, and recitals during the 1940s through the 1980s.

== Early life and education ==
Born in New York City, Trehy was the son of James and Julia Kighery Trehy. He had three brothers, William, James and John, and one sister, Mary. He graduated from Xavier High School and then served in the United States armed forces during World War II. Following the war, he entered the Mannes School of Music where he was a voice major. He then pursued further studies in singing in Vienna, and apprenticed in opera studies in Europe. He married his wife Maxine on July 4, 1946 which lasted until her death in 2000.

== Career ==
Trehy began his opera career in the 1950s singing roles with several leading opera houses in Germany for four years and also working extensively as a concert artist in Austria. He also performed leading roles at several important International music festivals, including those in Berlin, the Netherlands, Wiesbaden, and Belgrade.

After returning to the United States in the late 1950s, Trehy performed with opera companies and orchestras throughout North America up into the mid 1980s. He notably starred as Heathcliff in the world premiere of Carlisle Floyd's Wuthering Heights at the Santa Fe Opera in 1958, and portrayed "The Son" in the world premiere of Hugo Weisgall's Six Characters in Search of an Author with the New York City Opera in 1959. His other opera credits include performances with the ABC Opera Company, Opera Company of Boston, the Central City Opera, and the Washington National Opera among others.

As a concert singer, Trehy has performed with the Boston Pops under conductor Arthur Fiedler, the Detroit Symphony, the Saint Louis Symphony Orchestra, the Cleveland Orchestra, the Pittsburgh Symphony, the Denver Symphony, and in various concerts at NYC's Town Hall and Carnegie Hall. He also sang in the world premiere of Earl Wild's oratorio Revelations. From 1966–1969 he served as the cantor at St. Patrick's Cathedral, New York.

In 1969 Trehy joined the voice faculty at Pennsylvania State University where he taught concert and opera vocal repertoire. He worked there for fourteen years, and after retiring in 1983 was made a professor emeritus. He was also a fellow at the Penn State Institute for Arts and Humanistic Studies. He lived in retirement in State College, Pennsylvania until his death on November 23, 2009, of pneumonia.
