= James F. Ingalls =

American lighting designer

- Birth name: James F. Ingalls
- Genres: Opera Theater and Film
- Occupation: Lighting Designer

James F. Ingalls is a lighting designer who has worked extensively on Broadway, in London and at many regional theaters including Lincoln Center, Metropolitan Opera, Playwrights Horizons, Goodman Theatre, La Jolla Playhouse, and Steppenwolf. His credits also include various ballet companies and both national and international opera.

== Career ==
Ingalls graduated Yale School of Drama with a degree in stage management. Afterwards, Ingalls toured as a stage manager with Twyla Tharp Dance where he worked alongside Jennifer Tipton; thus beginning his career as a lighting designer. He designed the lighting for many of Peter Sellars' productions, including on The Persians in 1993. Ingalls resides in New York City and is an adjunct professor of Lighting Design. He often collaborates with The Wooden Floor dancers in Santa Ana, CA. James F and collaborated with the Goodman on Camino Real from season 2011 to 2012.

== Productions ==
1. The Big Knife [Play, Revival] April 16, 2013 - June 02, 2013
2. Glengarry Glen Ross [Play, Drama, Revival] December 08, 2012 - January 20, 2013
3. The People in the Picture [Musical, Comedy, Drama, Original] April 28, 2011 - June 19, 2011
4. Sixteen Wounded [Play, Drama, Original] April 15, 2004 - April 25, 2004
5. A Year With Frog and Toad [Musical, Comedy, Fantasy, Original] April 13, 2003 - June 15, 2003
6. The Elephant Man [Play, Drama, Revival] April 14, 2002 - June 02, 2002
7. George Gershwin Alone [Play, Play with music, Solo, One Act, Original] April 30, 2001 - July 22, 2001
8. Ivanov [Play, Revival] November 20, 1997 - January 04, 1998
9. The Young Man from Atlanta [Play, Original] March 27, 1997 - June 08, 1997
10. The Night of the Iguana [Play, Drama, Revival] March 21, 1996 - May 19, 1996
11. The Human Comedy [Musical, Opera, Original] April 05, 1984 - April 15, 1984
12. 'night, Mother [Play, Original] March 31, 1983 - February 26, 1984

== Works ==
- Theodora (1996)
- Doctor Atomic (2007)
- L'amour de loin (2004).

== Nominated Awards ==
=== Joseph Jefferson Award for Lighting Design ===
- 1991 "The Visit" at the Goodman Theatre in Chicago, Illinois.
- 1992 "The Good Person of Setzuan" at the Goodman Theatre in Chicago, Illinois.
- 1993 "Black Snow" at the Goodman Theatre in Chicago, Illinois.
- 1994 "The Night of the Iguana" at the Goodman Theatre in Chicago, Illinois.
- 1994 "Richard II" at the Goodman Theatre in Chicago, Illinois.
- 1995 "As I Lay Dying" at the Steppenwolf Theatre Company in Chicago, Illinois.
- 1995 "Three Sisters" at the Goodman Theatre in Chicago, Illinois.
- 1996 "The House of Martin Guerre" at the Goodman Theatre in Chicago, Illinois.
- 2009 Large for "Kafka on the Shore" at the Steppenwolf Theatre Company in Chicago, Illinois.
- 2012 Equity Joseph Jefferson Award for Lighting Design (Large) for the play, "Camino Real" at the Goodman Theatre in Chicago, Illinois.
