= Michael Best (tenor) =

American opera singer

Michael Best is an American operatic tenor and voice teacher. A native of North Carolina, he was a solo artist at the Metropolitan Opera in New York City, singing 297 performances in 17 seasons. He currently teaches voice at Roosevelt University's Chicago College of Performing Arts.

== Life and career ==
Born in Durham, North Carolina, Best received a Bachelor of Arts degree from Duke University in 1962 where he studied singing with John Hanks. He went on to earn a master's degree in vocal performance from the Juilliard School of Music in New York where he studied for 6 years. He made his professional opera debut in 1972 at the New York City Opera as Don Ottavio in Mozart's Don Giovanni.

Best made his debut at the Metropolitan Opera on November 16, 1979 as Toby Higgins in Rise and Fall of the City of Mahagonny. He continued to perform at the Met for the next 16 years in mainly comprimario parts, portraying such roles as Borsa in Rigoletto, the Chaplain in Dialogues des Carmélites, the First Knight in Parsifal, Gastone in La traviata, the Japanese Envoy in The Nightingale, Jaquino in Fidelio, a Jew in Salome, the Lover in Il tabarro, the Major-domo in Der Rosenkavalier, Monostatos in The Magic Flute, Nathanael in The Tales of Hoffmann, the Novice in Billy Budd, the Post Rider in La Fanciulla del West, Reverend Horace Adams in Peter Grimes, and The Son in Les mamelles de Tirésias among others. In 1991 he created the role of the Bishop in the world premiere of John Corigliano's The Ghosts of Versailles. His last performance at the Met was on December 6, 1995 when he reprised the role of Toby Higgins.

Other companies with which Best has sung roles include, the Santa Fe Opera and the Washington National Opera. He has also appeared as a soloist with the Baltimore Symphony Orchestra, the Boston Symphony Orchestra, the Cincinnati Symphony Orchestra, the Los Angeles Philharmonic, the New York Philharmonic, the Philadelphia Orchestra, and the Toronto Symphony Orchestra among others.

== Sources ==
- Metropolitan Opera, Performance record: Best, Michael (Tenor), MetOpera Database
- Roosevelt University, Faculty biography: Michael Best
