= Russell Christopher =

American opera singer (1930–2014)

Russell Lewis Christopher (March 12, 1930 – November 9, 2014) was an American operatic baritone who specialized in comprimario roles.

== Life and career ==
Christopher was born in Grand Rapids, Michigan on March 12, 1930. He received his Bachelor's and Master's degrees from the University of Michigan, where he was a soloist in the University of Michigan Men's Glee Club.

His voice teachers included Philip Duey and Raymond McDermot. He made his professional opera debut in 1959 as the Emperor in Giacomo Puccini's Turandot. In 1963 he won the Metropolitan Opera National Council Auditions. Between 1963 and 1991 he appeared in a total of 1,410 performances at the Metropolitan Opera.

Christopher died on November 9, 2014, at the age of 84.
