= Maria di Gerlando =

American opera singer

Maria di Gerlando (November 23, 1925 – May 24, 2010) was an American operatic soprano and voice teacher who was a leading performer at the New York City Opera from 1953 to 1969. She was best known for creating the role of Carmela in the 1954 world premiere of Gian Carlo Menotti's The Saint of Bleecker Street.

== Life and career ==
Born in Luzerne County, Pennsylvania, Gerlando made her professional opera debut in 1950 at the Boston Opera House with the touring San Carlo Opera Company as Mimì in Giacomo Puccini's La bohème. In 1953 she made her debut at the New York City Opera (NYCO) as Violetta in Giuseppe Verdi's La traviata. She continued to perform leading roles at the NYCO through 1969, singing such roles as Anna Gomez in The Consul, Cio-Cio-San in Madama Butterfly, Greta Fiorentino in Street Scene, Mimì, and the title role in Suor Angelica among others. In 1954 she made her Broadway debut as Carmela in Menotti's The Saint of Bleecker Street.

Outside of New York, di Gerlando appeared with several regional American opera companies during her career. In 1960 she sang the role of Desdemona in Verdi's Otello at the Washington National Opera (WNO) with James McCracken in the title role and Paul Callaway conducting the National Symphony Orchestra. She returned to the WNO the following season to perform the role of Liza in The Queen of Spades with David Lloyd as Herman and Elaine Bonazzi as the Countess. In 1961 she sang the role of Micaela in Georges Bizet's Carmen at the New Orleans Opera, a role she repeated in New York City in 1964 opposite Shirley Verrett in the title role and Julius Rudel conducting. In 1962 she sang Desdemona to Mario del Monaco's Otello at the Connecticut Opera.

Di Gerlando's international appearances were relatively few. In 1960 she sang Liù in Turandot opposite Plácido Domingo's Calàf in Monterrey, Mexico. With the Vancouver Opera she sang Mimì opposite Frank Porretta as Rodolfo in 1966.

Di Gerlando retired from the stage in the early 1970s. She then actively worked as a voice teacher and as a judge at singing competitions for many years. She died in 2010 in Paterson, New Jersey at the age of 84.
