= Susan Quittmeyer =

American mezzo-soprano (born 1953)

- Born: Susan Louise Quittmeyer; 1953 (age 72–73)
- Origin: United States
- Genres: Opera
- Occupation: Mezzo-soprano

Susan Louise Quittmeyer (born 1953) is an American mezzo-soprano.

== Biography ==
Raised in Port Washington, New York, she attended Illinois Wesleyan University, and is a 1978 graduate of the Manhattan School of Music. She created the roles of Hermione in John Harbison's A Winter's Tale in 1979 and Elmire in Kirke Mechem's Tartuffe in 1980, both for San Francisco Opera's American Opera Project, and sang Ariel in the world premiere of John Eaton's The Tempest in 1985 at Santa Fe Opera. With her husband, the bass-baritone James Morris, she has twin children, Daniel and Jennifer. A previous marriage ended in divorce. She made her European debut in 1985 at the Opéra du Rhin as the Composer in Ariadne auf Naxos, and bowed at the Metropolitan Opera as Nicklausse in Les Contes d'Hoffmann in 1987, a performance which also marked the company debut of conductor Charles Dutoit, and which was telecast on PBS.

In total she performed at the Met 41 times over five seasons.

Currently Quittmeyer teaches voice at the Mason Gross School of the Arts.
