= Carl Tanner =

American operatic tenor (born 1962)

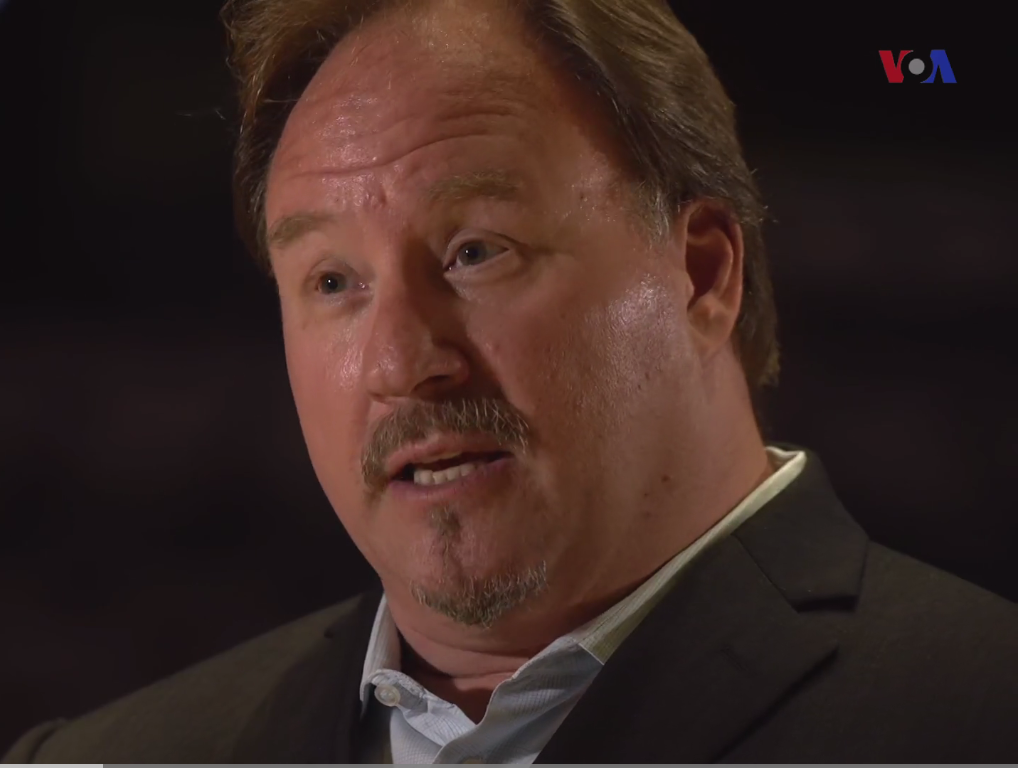
Carl Tanner featured in an VOA article.

Carl Tanner (born 1962, Arlington, Virginia) is an American operatic tenor.

== Early life and education ==
Born into "very modest means," Carl Tanner's earliest exposure to music was in the form of country icons such as John Denver, Willie Nelson, and Roy Clark. He began taking violin lessons at the age of 13 and, although he never took the instrument seriously, Tanner claims that this was the start of his love for classical music. A neighbor convinced him to try out for the high school chorus after hearing him sing in the shower, and after a year of singing as soloist for the chorus he auditioned for The Madrigals.

After graduating from Washington-Lee High School in Arlington, Virginia, Tanner attended the Shenandoah Conservatory of Music at Shenandoah University in Winchester, Virginia where in 1985 he earned a Bachelor's degree.

== Career ==
=== Odd jobs and transition ===
Upon his return to Arlington he enrolled in the Northern Virginia Trucking Academy and spent the next several years as a big rig truck driver. To earn extra money he moonlighted as a modern-day bounty hunter for Arlington-area bail bondsmen.

A turning point for Tanner came one day while he was inching his way along Interstate 95 in the cab of his 18-wheeler, singing the Giacomo Puccini aria "E lucevan le stelle" from Act III of Tosca to pass the time, when a woman in a convertible in the next lane called up to him: "Is that you, or is that the radio?" "That's me, lady," Tanner replied. "Well then, you've missed your calling," the woman declared. "You should be singing for a living, not driving."

=== Opera ===
Soon thereafter Tanner decided to embark upon a musical career. With the support of his employer, he moved to New York City in 1990 and, in late 1991 while working as a singing waiter in the restaurant Bianchi and Margarita's, he was heard by Richard Gaddes, the head of the Santa Fe Opera, who arranged for him to join the Apprentice Program for Singers for 1992 (and then 1993) to obtain more training. His most recent work was the role of Otello in Palm Beach Opera's Otello.

One of Tanner's first breaks came from the Opera Theatre of Northern Virginia, which signed him in 1994 to sing the title role in the rarely performed Edgar by Puccini. Tanner has since starred in a variety of leading roles in major opera houses, including Pagliacci in La Monnaie, Brussels, "Cavaradossi" in the Minnesota Orchestra production of Tosca, and Radames (alongside soprano Angela Brown) in Opera Pacific's Aida.

After performances with the Washington National Opera in their 2004-2005 season productions of Samson and Delilah and Il Trovatore, he returned to Santa Fe to sing "Calaf" in Turandot during the company's 2005 summer season. Tanner has also sung Calaf at many major opera houses in Germany plus, in 2006, he sang the role at the Maggio Musicale Fiorentino under the direction of Zubin Mehta and toured with that festival organization to Japan for several more performances.

On the concert stage Tanner has performed as soloist with many symphony orchestras including the St. Louis and Atlanta Symphonies, and the Roanoke and West Virginia Symphony orchestras in Verdi's Requiem. Tanner sang "O Holy Night" at the Christmas Tree lighting ceremony at the White House in 2004. He has recorded Puccini's Edgar (title role) and the role of Menelaus in Richard Strauss' Die ägyptische Helena with Deborah Voigt. In November 2006 Tanner released a CD of Christmas songs entitled Hear the Angel Voices.

=== Jewelry ===
In addition to his opera career, Tanner has been handcrafting jewelry since he was 15 years old. He is the owner and master jeweler of Carl Tanner Designs, a fine jewelry studio based in Virginia. The studio produces handmade pieces in gold (in yellow, white, and rose gold), platinum, sterling silver, and set with hand-selected natural gemstones including diamonds, rubies, sapphires, emeralds, opals, and pearls, amongst many other gems. Tanner personally selects each stone and oversees design, which begins as hand-drawn sketches before being realized as finished pieces. The studio offers several collections, including a Fine Gold Collection, a Fine Silver Collection, and a Moissanite Collection, as well as custom creations. Tanner has described the parallel between jewelry and opera as intentional, viewing both as forms of emotional storytelling meant to endure across generations.

In addition to operating his studio, Tanner regularly exhibits his jewelry at festivals, trade shows, and pop-up events throughout the East Coast, where he meets customers personally and showcases his handcrafted creations.

== Honors ==
He was inducted as a National Patron of Delta Omicron, an international professional music fraternity on August 8, 2005.

Tanner received an Honorary Doctorate in Music from his alma mater, Shenandoah University in 2009.
