= Anna Christy =

American soprano opera singer

Anna Christy (born July 26, 1976) is an American soprano opera singer. She studied at the Shepherd School of Music at Rice University and the University of Cincinnati College-Conservatory of Music and made her debut in 2000 as Papagena in The Magic Flute with the New York City Opera.

Christy sings a variety of lyric roles, including Cleopatra in Giulio Cesare, and coloratura roles such as Cunegonde in Candide and Oscar in Un ballo in maschera. She made her Metropolitan Opera debut in the 2004/5 season, and has sung with the Santa Fe Opera in Bright Sheng's Madame Mao, the Lyric Opera of Chicago, the San Francisco Opera, the Paris Opera, the Royal Opera House in London, and the Washington Concert Opera in Rossini's Bianca e Falliero.

In February 2010, she reprised her original 2008 interpretation of the title role in Donizetti's Lucia di Lammermoor for the English National Opera.
