= Philip Skinner =

American bass-baritone

Philip Skinner is an American bass-baritone who has sung leading roles in both North American and European opera houses. A veteran performer at San Francisco Opera, he made his debut there in 1985 and has gone on to sing over 35 roles with the company. In 2007, Skinner created the role of Edgar Ray Killen when San Francisco Opera staged the world premiere of the Philip Glass opera, Appomattox, and in 2015 he created the role of Casaubon in Allen Shearer's Middlemarch in Spring. He is a graduate of Northwestern University and received his master's degree from Indiana University, where he sang in the American premiere of Janáček's The Excursions of Mr. Brouček to the Moon.

== Recordings ==
- L'Africaine (1988) - San Francisco Opera Chorus and Orchestra, Maurizio Arena (conductor), Lotfi Mansouri (stage director) Plácido Domingo (Vasco da Gama), Ruth Ann Swenson (Inès), Shirley Verrett (Sélika), Justino Díaz (Nélusko), Michael Devlin (Don Pédro), Kevin Anderson (Don Alvar), Philip Skinner (Don Diego), Joseph Rouleau (The Grand Inquisitor), Mark Delavan (The High Priest of Brahma). Label: Kultur International Films, VHS (1989), DVD (2009)
