= Merola =

Merola is an Italian surname. Notable people with the surname include:

- Gaetano Merola (1881–1953), Italian composer, pianist and opera manager
- Mario Merola (lawyer) (1922–1987), American politician
- Mario Merola (singer) (1934–2006), Italian singer and actor
- Virginio Merola (born 1955), Italian politician

== See also ==
- Merola Opera Program, opera training program in San Francisco, California, United States
