= John Del Carlo =

American opera singer

John Del Carlo (September 21, 1951, San Francisco — October 29, 2016, Portland, Oregon) was an American bass-baritone who had an active international opera and concert career from 1973 to 2016. Music critic F. Paul Driscoll wrote that "Del Carlo had the distinction of being not only one of the busiest artists in opera but one of the best liked, beloved throughout the U.S. by audiences and by his colleagues for decades." He was particularly active with the San Francisco Opera where he performed regularly from 1973 to 2015, and with the Metropolitan Opera where he appeared in more than 300 performances in 21 seasons from 1993 to 2016. He also frequently appeared at the San Diego Opera and the Seattle Opera, and gave performances at important opera houses internationally, including the Lyric Opera of Chicago, the Paris Opera, the Royal Opera House in London, and the Zurich Opera among many others. A skilled actor, Opera News stated that "Del Carlo made a career specialty of bringing authentic character to roles that are often dismissed as comprimario parts; in Del Carlo's shrewdly judged performances, [these parts] became authentic star turns."

== Life and career ==
Born and raised in San Francisco, California, Del Carlo was trained in the Merola Opera Program at the San Francisco Opera (SFO). He made his professional debut with the program's touring arm: the Western Opera Theatre. In 1973 he made his MainStage debut with the company as the Fisherman in Benjamin Britten's Peter Grimes. Del Carlo considered the SFO his home base and he continued to perform regularly with the company for the next four decades in more than 40 productions. In 1976 he created the role of the Financier in the world premiere of Andrew Imbrie's Angle of Repose at the SFO. Some of the other roles he performed with the SFO were Abimélech in Saint-Saëns' Samson and Delilah, Achillas in Handel's Giulio Cesare, Alidoro in Rossini's La Cenerentola, Benoit in Puccini's La bohème, Billy Jackrabbit in Puccini's La fanciulla del West, Bogdanowitsch in Lehar's The Merry Widow, The Bonze in Puccini's Madama Butterfly, Bosun in Britten's Billy Budd, Doctor Bartolo in Rossini's The Barber of Seville, Don Pedro in Offenbach's La Périchole, Donner in Wagner's Das Rheingold, Dulcamara in Donizetti's L'elisir d'amore, the First Nazarene in Strauss' Salome, Fritz Kothner in Wagner's Die Meistersinger von Nürnberg, General Boom in Offenbach's La Grande-Duchesse de Gérolstein, Leopold in Strauss' Der Rosenkavalier, The One-eyed Man in Strauss' Die Frau ohne Schatten, Rangoni in Mussorgsky's Boris Godunov, Rychtar in Janáček's Jenůfa, the Steersman in Wagner's Tristan und Isolde, Zuane in La Gioconda, and the title role in Verdi's Falstaff. His final performance with the company was as Doctor Bartolo in Mozart's The Marriage of Figaro on July 5, 2015 with conductor Patrick Summers.

In the late 1970s Del Carlo was a member of the Young Artist Program at the San Diego Opera where he was a frequent guest performer up until his last appearance with the company in 2012 in the title role of Donizetti's Don Pasquale. He made his debut at the Metropolitan Opera as Kothner on January 14, 1993.
