= San Francisco Opera Center =

American professional opera singer training center

Coordinates: 37°46′43″N 122°25′16″W

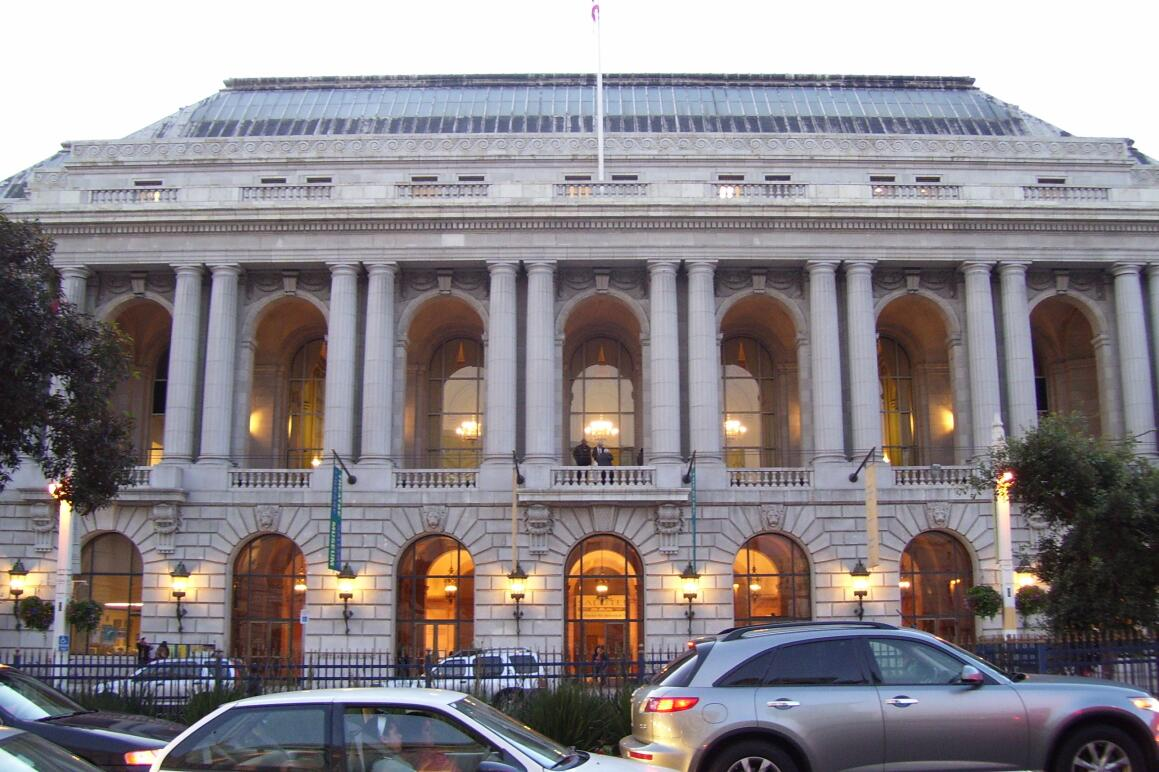
San Francisco Opera House

The San Francisco Opera Center (SFOC) is the San Francisco Opera's professional training center for opera singers. Based in San Francisco, it encompasses two different professional tracks for training: a summer training program known as the Merola Opera Program and a two year long term resident artist program known as the Adler Fellowship. For twenty years the SFOC also operated a touring opera company, the Western Opera Theatre, but for financial reasons this touring company was disbanded in 2003. In addition to providing training for opera singers, the Merola Opera Program also provides training for vocal coaches and stage directors. Four singers each year from the summer Merola Opera Program are offered Adler Fellowships with the San Francisco Opera. Soprano Sheri Greenawald served as director of the San Francisco Opera Center from 2002 through 2020.

== History ==
The San Francisco Opera Center was founded in 1982 by San Francisco Opera director Terence A. McEwen with the intent of consolidating the operation and administration of various educational, community outreach, and performance programs already existing at the San Francisco Opera, including the Adler Fellowship Program, Merola Opera Program, Western Opera Theatre, the "Showcase Series", "Brown Bag Opera", "Opera Center Singers", and "Schwabacher Recitals", among others.

The Merola Opera Program was the oldest of these programs, being established more than sixty years ago. On August 30, 1953, San Francisco Opera founder and first General Director, Gaetano Merola, died at Stern Grove while conducting a young American singer in "Un bel di" from Madama Butterfly. Maestro Merola wanted to provide young American singers opportunities as little formal training was available in the United States at the time and scant audition opportunities existed on the west coast. This prompted Mrs. Leland Atherton Irish of the Opera Guild of Southern California to ask the new San Francisco Opera General Director, Kurt Herbert Adler, why young western singers had to go to New York to audition.

The Merola Memorial Fund was used to underwrite the San Francisco Opera Debut Auditions, professional auditions for singers from the western United States. The first regional auditions were held in Los Angeles, Pasadena, Sacramento, San Diego, San Jose, and San Francisco. Two hundred thirty-seven young singers applied and two hundred twelve were auditioned. Fifteen singers advanced to the semi-finals, on June 2, 1954. The eight finalists went on to the first San Francisco Opera Debut Auditions which took place at KNBC studios on June 13 and were broadest over KNBC.

== Merola Opera Program ==
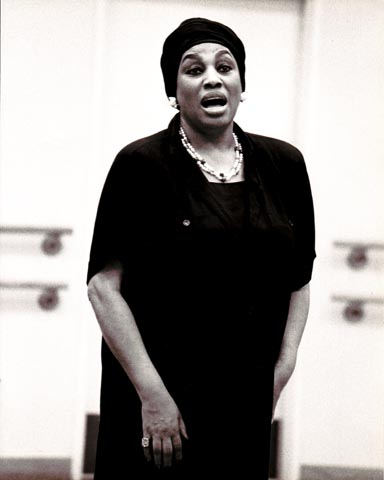
Opera singer Leontyne Price directing a master class in the Merola Opera Program in 1986.

The Merola Opera Program is a world-renowned opera training and performance program for promising young artists. Named for San Francisco Opera's first general director, Gaetano Merola, the Merola Opera Program began during the 1954-55 season and established its full training program in 1957. In 2010 The Wall Street Journal stated that the Merola Opera Program "outranks any comparable program in the country, not only in the range, intensity, and quality of its training, but in the stature of its alumni." Training for opera singers includes masterclasses with leading singers in the field, daily individual sessions with vocal coaches, acting classes, stage movement classes, and classes in applying ones own stage makeup and dealing with the unique challenges of moving and singing arias in period costumes.

The Program annually offers approximately 30 artists the opportunity of studying, coaching, and participating in master classes with established professionals for eleven and twelve weeks during the summer (12 weeks for apprentice coaches and 11 weeks for singers). Participants also perform in two complete opera productions with orchestra and the Schwabacher Summer Concert. The program incorporates intensive training in operatic repertory languages, diction, acting and movement and culminates with the Merola Grand Finale, a concert with full orchestra at the War Memorial Opera House. Merola also enables young coach accompanists and stage directors of exceptional talent to develop skills through the apprentice coach and stage director programs. The Merola Opera Program is a financially independent 501(c)3 organization that operates in close collaboration with the San Francisco Opera Center and San Francisco Opera.

The Merola Opera Program is free to its artists and is supported by contributions of individuals, foundations and government entities. The program covers the artists' travel, housing, weekly stipends and all training expenses. In addition, Merola alums may apply for Career Grants up to $12,000 for the five years following their participation in the program.

=== Merola alumni ===
- Maria Abajan (1979)
- Brian Asawa (1991)
- René Barbera (2008)
- Ricardo Bernal
- Janai Brugger (2010)
- Raehann Bryce-Davis (2015)
- Gregory Carroll
- Rihab Chaieb (2013)
- John Chest (2009)
- Laura Claycomb (1989 & 1990)
- Arturo Chacón Cruz (2003)
- Mark Delavan (1985)
- John Del Carlo
- Joyce DiDonato (1997)
- Julianna Di Giacomo
- Amina Edris (2015)
- AJ Glueckert (2012)
- Susan Graham (1987)
- Nancy Gustafson (1982)
- Thomas Hampson (1980)
- Wendy Bryn Harmer (2004)
- Elza van den Heever (2003 & 2004)
- Bryan Hymel
- Brian Jagde (2009)
- Quinn Kelsey (2002)
- Alasdair Kent (2015)
- Gary Lakes (1981)
- Theo Lebow (2012)
- Alexander Lewis (2010)
- Ao Li (2010)
- Daniela Mack (2007)
- Amanda Majeski (2008)
- Sylvia McNair (1982)
- Lucas Meachem (2003)
- Leona Mitchell (1971)
- Paula Murrihy
- Anna Netrebko (1996)
- Aryeh Nussbaum Cohen (2016)
- Sean Panikkar (2004)
- Pene Pati (2013)
- Ailyn Perez (2005)
- Patricia Racette (1988)
- John Relyea (1995)
- Nadine Sierra (2010)
- Philippe Sly (2011)
- Noah Stewart (2006)
- Kurt Streit (1986)
- Fernando del Valle
- Patrick Summers
- Ruth Ann Swenson (1981 & 1982)
- Jess Thomas (1957)
- Riki Turofsky
- Carol Vaness (1976)
- Rolando Villazón
- Deborah Voigt (1985)
- Dolora Zajick (1983)
- Elizabeth Zharoff (2011)

== Adler Fellowship ==
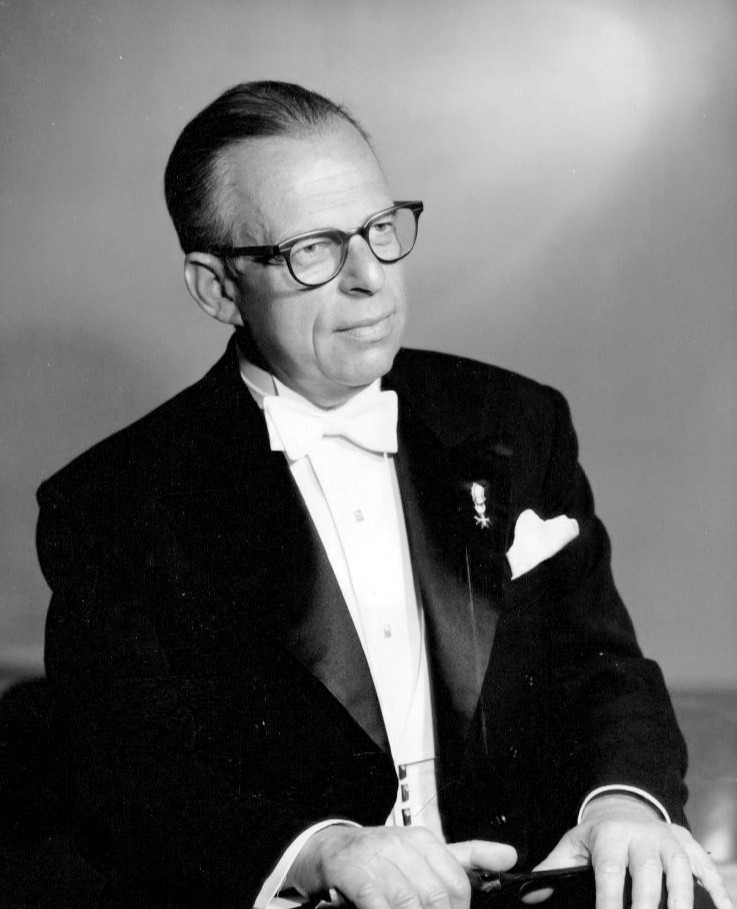
Kurt Herbert Adler (1966)

The Adler Fellowship is a program to support young singers managed by the San Francisco Opera, started under the leadership of General Director Terence A. McEwen. The fellowship is named after Kurt Herbert Adler who managed the opera from 1953 until 1981. The fellowship comes with training and performance opportunities.

=== Fellows ===
- Gregory Stapp (1982)
- Ruth Ann Swenson (1983–84)
- Nancy Gustafson (1983–84)
- David Malis (1984–85)
- Dolora Zajick (1984–85)
- Monte Pederson (1985–86)
- Philip Skinner (1986–87)
- Deborah Voigt (1986)
- Mark Delavan (1986–87)
- Kevin Anderson (1988)
- Janet Williams (1988–89)
- Patricia Racette (1989–90)
- Mary Mills (1990–91)
- Laura Claycomb (1991-1993)
- Brian Asawa (1992)
- James Caputo (1993)
- Daniel Sumegi (1993–94)
- Claudia Waite (1994–95)
- Zheng Cao (1995–96)
- John Relyea (1996–97)
- Stuart Skelton (1996–97)
- Armando Gama (1998–99)
- James Westman (1999)
- Katia Escalera (2001)
- Elizabeth Caballero (2003)
- Karen Slack (2003)
- Lucas Meachem (2004)
- Nikki Einfeld (2004–05)
- Thomas G. Glenn (2004–05)
- Joshua Bloom (2004–05)
- Sean Panikkar (2005–06)
- Noah Stewart (2007)
- Daniela Mack (2008–09)
- Brian Jagde (2010-2012)
- Nadine Sierra (2011–2012)
- Ao Li (2011-2013)
- Philippe Sly (2013–14)
- Amina Edris (2016–17)
- Pene Pati (2016–17)
