= René Barbera =

American operatic tenor (born 1984)

- Born: March 18, 1984 (age 42); Webb County, Texas, United States
- Education: North Carolina School of the Arts
- Occupation: Operatic tenor
- Awards: Metropolitan Opera National Council Auditions
- Website: renebarbera.com

René Barbera (born March 18, 1984) is an American tenor who has had an active international performance career in concerts and operas since 2008. A native of San Antonio, Texas, he was educated at the University of North Carolina School of the Arts, the Merola Opera Program, the Ryan Opera Center, and the American Institute of Musical Studies in Graz, Austria. Early in his career he won the Metropolitan Opera National Council Auditions in 2008, and three awards at the Operalia competition in 2011. He made his debut at the Lyric Opera of Chicago in 2009 and has since worked as a leading tenor in opera houses and concert halls internationally. Some of the organizations he has performed with include the Bavarian State Opera, the Deutsche Oper Berlin, La Fenice, La Scala, the Metropolitan Opera, the Paris Opera, and the Vienna State Opera, among many others.

While he sings a range of music, Barbera is closely associated with the bel canto repertory, often appearing in the operas of Gioachino Rossini, Gaetano Donizetti, and Vincenzo Bellini. Roles which he has frequently performed include Rossini's Almaviva in The Barber of Seville and Ramiro in La Cenerentola, Donizetti's Riccardo Percy in Anna Bolena, Nemorino in L'elisir d'amore and Ernesto in Don Pasquale, and Bellini's Lord Arturo Talbo in I puritani. He has also frequently performed as Verdi's Alfredo in La traviata and the Duke of Mantua in Rigoletto.

== Early life and education ==
The son of Miguel Pablo Barbera and Graciela Osornio, Erich René Barbera was born in Webb County, Texas, on March 18, 1984. His early years were spent living in Laredo, Texas. His parents were of Mexican heritage and he grew up speaking both Spanish and English. His earliest music experiences were with his family who were talented amateur folk musicians. René moved with his family to San Antonio, Texas, when he was nine years old. He began studying piano at the age of three. He later became a member of the San Antonio's Boys Choir at the age of 10. When he was eleven years old he performed a lead role in his first opera, portraying the title role in Gian Carlo Menotti's Amahl and the Night Visitors in a church production in San Antonio.

Barbera studied one year at the University of Texas at San Antonio, where he studied under Michael Burgess. He dropped out of its music program to live with his brother in Colorado where he continued his voice studies privately with soprano Martile Rowland. He participated in the Vocal Arts Symposium in Colorado Springs where he studied with Steve LaCrosse and James Allbritten. In 2004 he began his studies at the University of North Carolina School of the Arts (UNCSA), graduating with a Bachelor of Music in 2008. There he was a voice student of soprano Marilyn Taylor. He won the Metropolitan Opera National Council Auditions in 2008 while in his senior year at UNCSA. After graduation he continued his development as a young artist in the Merola Opera Program at the San Francisco Opera Center in the summer of 2008.

In 2008–2009 Barbera continued his education at the American Institute of Musical Studies in Graz, Austria and as a member of the young artist program at the Florida Grand Opera. In August 2009 he began his tenure as a young artist at Ryan Opera Center. He was the recipient of three awards of the Operalia competition in 2011.

== Career ==
Barbera made his professional concert debut performing a concert of opera arias with the Greensboro Symphony Orchestra at the Aycock Auditorium on the campus of University of North Carolina at Greensboro under the baton of Dmitry Sitkovetsky. He returned to Greensboro in 2009 as a soloist in Rossini's Stabat Mater with the Choral Society of Greensboro. He later performed as a soloist in this oratorio again at the Teatro Massimo in Palermo, Italy in 2020, and La Scala in Milan in 2021. In 2010 he was a soloist in Handel's Messiah with the Apollo Chorus of Chicago.

Barbera made his professional opera debut at the Lyric Opera of Chicago (LOC) as Don Riccardo in Verdi's Ernani in October 2009. He sang a variety of comprimario roles at the LOC in his early career, among them the judge in Verdi's Un ballo in maschera (2010), the smuggler Le Remendado in Bizet's Carmen (2010–2011), Brighella in R. Strauss's Ariadne auf Naxos (2011), Lord Arturo Bucklaw in Donizetti's Lucia di Lammermoor (2011), and Harry in Puccini La fanciulla del West (2011). His first major tenor role was at the Opera Theatre of Saint Louis (OTSL) in the summer of 2011 where he portrayed Tonio in La fille du régiment with Ashley Emerson as Marie. He later repeated this role in 2017 productions at the Austin Opera and Zurich Opera.

In 2012 Barbera gave his first performance outside of the United States at the Canadian Opera Company as Rinuccio in Puccini's Gianni Schicchi, and appeared with Chicago Symphony Orchestra as Tamino in Mozart's The Magic Flute at the Ravinia Festival. That same year he performed his first leading tenor role at the LOC, the role of Ernesto in Donizetti's Don Pasquale. He subsequently performed this role for his debuts at La Scala (2018) and the Vienna State Opera (2018), and in return engagements to the Teatro Massimo (2023) and Opéra National de Paris (2023). He also gave his first performances of Count Almaviva in Rossini's The Barber of Seville in 2012 at the Michigan Opera Theatre and Vancouver Opera. In of his signature roles, he has subsequently appeared as Count Almaviva at Stanislavski and Nemirovich-Danchenko Theatre (2013), Teatro dell'Opera di Roma (2014 & 2022), Teatro di San Carlo (2014), the Opéra National de Paris (2014, 2018, & 2022), San Francisco Opera (2015), Los Angeles Opera (2015), Teatro Comunale di Bologna (2016), Dohnányi Orchestra Budafok (2017), Dutch National Opera (2018), Vienna State Opera (2019–2020, & 2025), New National Theatre Tokyo (2020), Teatro Carlo Felice (2020), and thee Arena di Verona Festival (2024).

In 2013 Barbera appeared for the first time at the Santa Fe Opera as Rodrigo di Dhu in Rossini's La donna del lago, and at the Teatro del Maggio Musicale Fiorentino as Nemorino in Donizetti's L'elisir d'amore. He has subsequently performed the role of Nemorino at the OTSL (2014), La Scala (2019), Royal Opera House Muscat (2023), Teatro Massimo (2025), Hamburg State Opera (2025), and the Teatro Regio, Turin (2025). He made his debut at the Opéra National de Paris in 2013 as Lord Arturo Talbo in Bellini's I puritani, a role he has since performed at the Festival Radio France Occitanie Montpellier (2017), Staatsoper Stuttgart (2018), Washington Concert Opera (2021), and the Tiroler Festspiele Erl (2024–2025).

The year 2013 also marked Barbera's first performances in another one of his signature roles, Ramiro in Rossini's La Cenerentola, which he portrayed that year in productions at the Los Angeles Opera, Seattle Opera, and Palm Beach Opera. He has since appeared as Ramiro in productions at the San Francisco Opera (2014), Teatro Massimo (2016), Cologne Opera (2016), Bavarian State Opera (2018 & 2026), and New National Theatre Tokyo (2021). Known as a Rossini interpreter, Barbera has made several appearances at the Rossini Opera Festival, appearing there as Giannetto in La gazza ladra (2015), Narciso in Il turco in Italia (2016), and Adelberto in Adelaide di Borgogna (2023). In 2016 he made his debut at the Metropolitan Opera ("Met") as Lindoro in Rossini's L'italiana in Algeri, a role he had previously sung at the Arena di Verona Festival in 2014. In 2016 he performed the role of Argirio in Rossini's Tancredi with the Accademia Bizantina. In 2024 he portrayed the title role in Rossini's William Tell at the New National Theatre Tokyo.

In 2014 Barbera performed the role of the Duke of Mantua in Verdi's Rigoletto for the first time with Opera Colorado. He has repeated this role many times, including in performances at Piedmont Opera (2015), Semperoper (2017–2018), Dallas Opera (2022), Dutch National Opera (2024), and Los Angeles Opera (2025). He sang his first Alfredo in La traviata at the Dallas Opera in 2017, and has since sung this role at the Teatro Massimo (2017), Semperoper (2018–2019), Festival Internacional de Música "Castell de Peralada" (2019), La Scala (2019), Salazar Dresden Philharmonic (2021), Opéra National de Paris (2024 & 2026), and the Arena di Verona Festival (2026). His other Verdi repertoire includes the role of Fenton in Falstaff which he performed at La Fenice in 2022, and many performances as the tenor soloist in Verdi's Requiem. He has sung this latter work with the Seattle Symphony (2013), Philharmonie de Paris (2018), NDR Elbphilharmonie Orchestra (2019), Teatro Massimo (2020), Koncerthuset (2021), Orchestre de la Suisse Romande (2024), Edinburgh International Festival (2024), Concertgebouw, Amsterdam (2025), and the Accademia Nazionale di Santa Cecilia (2026).

In 2015 Barbera returned to the San Francisco Opera as Iopas in Hector Berlioz's Les Troyens. In 2017 he returned to the OTSL as Tito Vespasian in Wolfgang Amadeus Mozart's La clemenza di Tito. That same year he sang his first performances as Sir Edgardo di Ravenswood in Donizetti's Lucia di Lammermoor for his debut at the Deutsche Oper Berlin, a role he later reprised at the Teatro di San Carlo in 2026. In 2019 he appeared as Idamore in Donizetti's rarely staged opera Il paria with Opera Rara. His other Donizetti repertoire includes the role of Riccardo Percy in Anna Bolena which he has performed at the Teatro dell'Opera di Roma (2019), Teatro di San Carlo (2023), and the Deutsche Oper Berlin (2023–2024). In 2025 he appeared as Gennaro in Donnizetti's Lucrezia Borgia at the Teatro del Maggio Musicale Fiorentino.

In 2019 Babera returned to the Teatro Massimo, Palermo in the title role of Mozart's Idomeneo. His other Mozart repertoire includes the role of Don Ottavio in Don Giovanni which he performed at the Teatro Comunale di Bologna in 2024. In 2022 he returned to the Dallas Opera as Nadir in Bizet's Les pêcheurs de perles. In 2023 he appeared for the first time at the Opéra Royal de Wallonie as Elvino in Bellini's Bellini's La sonnambula, a role he had previously performed at the Washington Concert Opera in 2012. He returned to the Met in 2023 as the Italian singer in Richard Strauss's Der Rosenkavalier, a role he sang earlier at the LOC in 2016. In 2024 he was a featured soloist at the Salzburg Festival (SF) for a concert celebrating Plácido Domingo's 50th anniversary with the SF.

Barbera's 2026 engagements include the role of Rodolfo in Puccini's La bohème at the Teatro dell'Opera di Roma and the Teatro di San Carlo, and the title role in The Tales of Hoffmann at the Teatro Colón in Argentina.
