= Gregory Carroll =

Gregory or Greg Carroll may refer to:

- Greg Carroll (Australian actor), Australian actor
- Gregory Carroll (R&B singer), American R&B singer
- Gregory Carroll (tenor), American opera singer
- Greg Carroll (ice hockey), Canadian ice hockey player
