= Lotfi Mansouri =

Iranian-born opera director and manager

Lotfollah "Lotfi" Mansouri (15 June 1929 – 30 August 2013) was an Iranian-born opera director and manager. His directing career began in around 1960. He is best known for being the General Director of the Canadian Opera Company and of the San Francisco Opera, which he ran from 1988 through 2001. In 1992 he became a Chevalier of France's Ordre des Arts et des Lettres. His autobiography was published in 2010.

Mansouri introduced opera surtitles—titles projected onto a screen above the stage that allow the audience to follow the libretto during the performance of an opera.

== Biography ==
Mansouri was born in Tehran, Iran, the son of Hassan and Mehri (Jalili) Mansouri. He married Marjorie Anne Thompson on September 18, 1954; he has a daughter, Shireen Melinda.

Mansouri studied psychology at the University of California, Los Angeles (A.B., 1953) and was assistant professor there (1957–60). In 1957 he attended the voice program of the Music Academy of the West summer conservatory. He began his directorial career with a production of Cosi fan tutte at Los Angeles City College, and several musical theater productions at Marymount College. From 1960 to 1966, he worked as a resident stage director at the Zurich Opera. In his first year there, he staged new productions of Amahl and the Night Visitors, La traviata, Don Pasquale, and Samson et Dalila. From 1966 through 1976 he worked as the head stage director at the Geneva Opera. Throughout this period, he occasionally worked at numerous U.S. opera houses, including the Metropolitan Opera and many smaller companies.

Among his productions available on DVD, are La fille du régiment (with Beverly Sills, 1974), Anna Bolena (with Dame Joan Sutherland, James Morris and Ben Heppner) and L'africaine (with Shirley Verrett and Plácido Domingo, 1988).

His other works include Royal Opera House Premiere of Massenet's Esclarmonde in 1983.

=== Canadian Opera Company ===
From 1976 through 1988, Mansouri worked as the general director of the Canadian Opera Company in Toronto, Ontario, Canada. Mansouri introduced surtitles for the January 1983 staging of Elektra, and this is generally regarded as the first use of such a translation system. Mansouri directed several operas for the company, both during and after his term as general director.

=== San Francisco Opera ===
In 1988, Mansouri become the fourth general director of the San Francisco Opera, replacing Terence A. McEwen.

Mansouri led the company in commissioning several new works which have received critical acclaim, including John Adams' The Death of Klinghoffer (1992), Conrad Susa's The Dangerous Liaisons (Fall 1994), Stewart Wallace's Harvey Milk (1996) (co-commissioned with Houston Grand Opera and New York City Opera), André Previn's A Streetcar Named Desire (Fall 1998), and Jake Heggie's Dead Man Walking (Fall 2000). This move has helped build the house's reputation as one of the leading innovators in the United States, a reputation which is still held today.

Towards the end of the 2001 season, Mansouri announced his resignation and was succeeded by Pamela Rosenberg, formerly of the Stuttgart Opera.

== Personal ==
Mansouri was born in Iran and lived in Zurich, Geneva, Toronto and San Francisco. He died at home in Pacific Heights area of San Francisco and survived by his wife Marjorie Thompson and daughter, Shireen.

== References and sources ==
Sources

- Chatfield-Taylor, Joan (1997). San Francisco Opera: The First Seventy-Five Years. San Francisco: Chronicle Books. ISBN 0-8118-1368-1.
- Chatfield-Taylor, Joan (1998). An Operatic Odyssey: Lotfi Mansouri and San Francisco Opera. San Francisco: Performing Arts Network. OCLC 44534470.
- Joshua Kosman (5 August 2001). "Two views of Mansouri's S.F. era: Opera director was gambling man". San Francisco Chronicle.
- Current Biography Yearbook. 1990 edition. New York: H. W. Wilson Co., 1990.
- Who's Who in Opera. An international biographical directory of singers, conductors, directors, designers, and administrators. Also including profiles of 101 opera companies. Edited by Maria F. Rich. New York: Arno Press, 1976.
- The Metropolitan Opera Encyclopedia. A comprehensive guide to the world of opera. Edited by David Hamilton. New York: Simon and Schuster, 1987.
- The New Grove Dictionary of Opera. Four volumes. Edited by Stanley Sadie. London: Macmillan Press, 1992.
- The New Grove Dictionary of Opera. Four volumes. Edited by Stanley Sadie. New York: Grove's Dictionaries of Music, (n.d.).
- Baker's Dictionary of Opera. Edited by Laura Kuhn. New York: Schirmer Books, 2000
