= Licia Albanese =

Italian-born American operatic soprano (1909–2014)

Felicia Albanese (July 22, 1909 – August 15, 2014) was an Italian-born American operatic soprano. Noted especially for her portrayals of the lyric heroines of Verdi and Puccini,

Albanese was a leading artist with the Metropolitan Opera from 1940 to 1966. and was also associated with the San Francisco Opera

She also made many broadcasts and recordings and was chairwoman of The Licia Albanese-Puccini Foundation, which is dedicated to assisting young artists and singers.

== Early life ==
Albanese as Cio-Cio-San in Puccini's Madama Butterfly

Felicia Albanese was born in Torre Pelosa, a subdivision of Noicattaro, Italy, on July 22, 1909. Later she went to Torre a Mare, a quarter of Bari (the chief town of the Apulia region).

== Career ==
=== Stage performance ===
Albanese made her unofficial debut in Milan in 1934, when she replaced another soprano in Puccini's Madama Butterfly, the role for which she would be celebrated. Over 40 years, she sang more than 300 performances of Cio-Cio-San. Although she has been praised for many of her roles, including Mimì, Violetta, Liù and Manon Lescaut, it is her portrayal of the geisha which has remained her best known. Her connection with that work began early with her teacher, Giuseppina Baldassare-Tedeschi, a contemporary of the composer, and an important exponent of the title role in the previous generation.

There is some controversy regarding when she made her formal debut. It was either in that same year (1934) at the Teatro Municipale in Bari, singing in La bohème, or in Parma, or in Milan in 1935 in Madama Butterfly. By the end of that year, she had debuted at La Scala as Lauretta in Gianni Schicchi. She soon realized great success all over the world, especially for her performances in Carmen, L'amico Fritz and Madama Butterfly in Italy, France and England.

She made her Metropolitan Opera debut on February 9, 1940, in the first of 72 performances as Madama Butterfly at the old Metropolitan Opera House in spite of the fact that after the December 7, 1941 Pearl Harbor attack, performances of that opera were banned in the U.S. until the end of World War II. Her success was instantaneous, and Albanese remained at the Met for 26 seasons, performing a total of 427 performances of 17 roles in 16 operas. She left the company in 1966 in a dispute with General Manager Sir Rudolf Bing, without a grand farewell. After performing in four productions during 1965/66, she was scheduled for only one performance the next season. She returned her contract unsigned.

Albanese was also a mainstay at the San Francisco Opera where she sang between 1941 and 1961, performing 22 roles in 120 performances over 20 seasons, remaining in part because of her admiration for its director, Gaetano Merola. Throughout her career, she continued to perform widely in recital, concert, and opera, she was heard throughout the country; she participated in benefits, entertained the troops, had her own weekly radio show, was a guest on other broadcasts and telecasts, and recorded frequently.

She went to San Francisco in the summer of 1972 for the special gala concert at Sigmund Stern Recreation Grove celebrating the 50th anniversary of the San Francisco Opera. Joining numerous colleagues who had sung with the company, Albanese sang the duet from Madama Butterfly with tenor Frederick Jagel, accompanied by the San Francisco Opera Orchestra conducted by longtime director Kurt Herbert Adler.

Even after a career spanning seven decades, Albanese continued to perform occasionally. After hearing her sing the national anthem during a Met opening, Stephen Sondheim and Thomas Z. Shepard cast her as operetta diva Heidi Schiller in Sondheim's Follies in concert with the New York Philharmonic at Avery Fisher Hall in 1985. During the 1987 spring season of the Theatre Under the Stars in Houston, Texas, Albanese appeared in a stage revival of Follies, which was a great success.

Her popularity in La traviata was such that she sang more performances of that opera at the Met and the San Francisco Opera than any other singer in either company's history.

Her voice had a distinctive character which the Italians call a lirico spinto, marked by its quick vibrato, incisive diction, intensity of attack and unwavering emotional impact. During her career she performed with many of the contemporary greats of opera—Beniamino Gigli, Claudia Muzio, Jussi Björling, and Franco Corelli. She worked with some of the best conductors of her time, but it is her work with Toscanini that has endured. Despite her talent and numerous performances, she was not the best known of her contemporaries, overshadowed in her day by Zinka Milanov, Maria Callas, Victoria de los Ángeles and Renata Tebaldi.

Alfredo Vecchio, a frequent member of the audience at her performances, gave the following tribute to the career of Albanese at the Columbus Club, Park Avenue, New York City, in 1986:

Like all great artists, Licia's specific ingenuity as a singer, the originality of her art, lay in the fact that technique for this artist at least was always a means to an end and never an end in itself: for the salient features of all great art is the ability to connect technique to the emotions. Any other approach would have been for Albanese contrary to the musical sense with which she was born, contrary to musical training she acquired, and, if such exists, contrary to her musical morality. It was this, Licia's uniqueness and musical mastery which drew me, which drew us, into the world of Mimi, Cio-Cio-San, Manon, Liù and Violetta week after week, year after year, inviting me to a place and places I had never been before. It is for all these reasons that Virgil Thomson was able to write of Licia's first Violetta: 'She did not sing the role, she recreated it for our times.' As we all know, Albanese's art is capable of the widest range of effects from the tragic to the comedic, from dramatic repertoire to the lyrical and even soubrette: and for anyone fortunate enough to have heard her rendition of operetta pieces, she leaves no doubt in the mind that she was born to the operetta form as well as to the rest.

To all of her work, Albanese brought passion and commitment, with her rich soprano voice, equalized throughout its range, thrilling in its climaxes. However, despite her repeated performances, she never fell into routine. As she explained in a 2004 interview with Allan Ulrich of the San Francisco Chronicle, "I always changed every performance. I was never boring, and I am against copying. What I learned from the great singers was not to copy, but that the drama is in the music."

=== Broadcasting, recordings and legacy ===
External audio
- Albanese and Richard Tucker in All-Puccini program (1959), WQXR
- Full recording (1946) of Albanese singing in Verdi's La traviata with the NBC Symphony Orchestra conducted by Arturo Toscanini
- Full recording (1951) of Albanese singing as Micaëla in Bizet's Carmen with the RCA Orchestra conducted by Fritz Reiner

Albanese appeared in the very first live telecast from the Metropolitan Opera, Verdi's Otello, opposite Ramón Vinay and Leonard Warren, conducted by Fritz Busch. One of the first generation of opera singers to appear widely in recordings and on the radio, her performances, now reappearing on both compact disc and video, have provided a lasting testament to her ability.

Arturo Toscanini invited Albanese to sing Mimì in the 1946 NBC Symphony Orchestra in Studio8H NBC performance of La bohème. The broadcast marked the 50th anniversary of the opera's premiere which he had conducted in 1896. The following season Toscanini cast her again, this time as Violetta in a now-classic performance of La traviata, broadcast nationally on NBC Radio on December 1 and 8, 1946. Both performances were subsequently released on records by RCA Victor and have since continuously remained in print.

Albanese was noted for the grace with which she performed La traviata under the maestro's famously intense direction. "Maria Callas once asked me how I ever got through it, but Toscanini wanted it that way," Albanese later recalled. "'It should be like champagne,' he said. I complained to him, and he said, 'You can do it.' Before I sang the part, I went to a hospital to study the behavior of people with tuberculosis and I learned that sometimes they can be hysterical."

In 1959, she performed for millions of radio listener's with the New York Philharmonic alongside Alfredo Antonini and Richard Tucker and the during the "Italian Nights" live broadcasts from Lewisohn Stadium in New York City.

She and her colleagues performed songs from the works of Puccini operas, including Madama Butterfly, Tosca, Turandot and La Boheme.

She recorded mainly for RCA Victor. Among her recordings are Bizet's Carmen under the direction of Fritz Reiner, with Risë Stevens and Jan Peerce (1951) and Puccini's Manon Lescaut with Jussi Björling and Robert Merrill, conducted by Jonel Perlea (1954). For a 1951 recording conducted by Leopold Stokowski of Tatiana's Letter Scene from Tchaikovsky's Eugene Onegin, a part she had never sung before, she learnt Russian especially for the occasion.

Soprano Teresa Stratas was quoted as crediting a Metropolitan Opera performance of La traviata starring Albanese at Toronto's Maple Leaf Gardens, with motivating her toward a singing career.

Albanese was chairman of The Licia Albanese-Puccini Foundation, founded in 1974 and dedicated to assisting young artists and singers. She also served as a trustee of the Bagby Foundation. She worked with the Juilliard School of Music, the Manhattan School of Music, and Marymount Manhattan College, and conducted master classes throughout the world.

== Death ==
Albanese died at her home in Manhattan, on August 15, 2014, at the age of 105.

== National and international honors ==
Albanese became a United States citizen in 1945. On October 5, 1995, President Bill Clinton presented her with the National Medal of Honor for the Arts.

She received awards and honorary degrees from Marymount Manhattan College, Montclair State Teachers College, Saint Peter's College, New Jersey, Seton Hall University, University of South Florida, Fairfield University, Siena College, Caldwell College, and Fairleigh Dickinson University.

Albanese was awarded the prestigious Handel Medallion, the highest official honor given by the City of New York and presented to individuals for their contributions to the city's cultural life, from Rudolph Giuliani in 2000. At the ceremony, Mayor Giuliani commemorated the career of a woman who is "without question [one] of the most loved and respected performers in the world."
