= Nikki Einfeld =

Canadian soprano (born 1978)

Nikki Einfeld (born January 6, 1978) is a Canadian born Lyric Coloratura Soprano.

A former Adler Fellow and Merola Alumni with San Francisco Opera. She was a Grand Finalist in the 2006 Metropolitan Opera National Council Auditions. While an Adler Fellow with San Francisco Opera, she performed many roles including Mascha in The Queen of Spades by Pyotr Ilyich Tchaikovsky, Papagena in The Magic Flute, Serpina in La Serva Padrona by Giovanni Battista Pergolesi, the title role in Rita by Gaetano Donizetti and Pauline in The Seagull.

She has also appeared as Susanna in The Marriage of Figaro (New Orleans Opera), The Queen of the Night in The Magic Flute with the Canadian Opera Company and as Adina in Manitoba Opera's production of L'elisir d'amore. As a participant in the renowned Merola Opera Program, with the San Francisco Opera, Ms. Einfeld performed in The Medium by Gian-Carlo Menotti and Angelique by Jacques Ibert. Additional operatic appearances include Rosina, in The Barber of Seville (Saskatoon Opera), Zerlina in Don Giovanni (Manitoba Opera), and Gretel in Humperdinck's Hansel and Gretel, (on tour with NUOVA). Nikki Einfeld's affinity for recital and concert repertoire, including many 20th and 21st century work premieres. Her competition credits include First prize in the internationally recognized Eckhardt-Gramatee National Music Competition (2002), which led to a tour of Canada's major music communities in recital with collaborating pianist Shannon Hiebert. Ms. Einfeld was also a multiple prize-winner 32nd CBC Radio-Canada National Competition for Young Performers (2003) and the First place winner of the Metropolitan Opera Pacific Regional Auditions (2005).
