= Mary Mills (soprano) =

American opera singer (born 1964)

- Born: Mary Elizabeth Mills; 1964 (age 61–62); Shreveport, Louisiana
- Education: University of Cincinnati College-Conservatory of Music; Yale University
- Occupations: Operatic soprano Voice teacher
- Spouse: Markus Gertken (divorced)
- Children: 2

Mary Elizabeth Mills (born 1964) is an American opera singer.

== Early life ==
Mills was born in Shreveport, Louisiana, but moved to Dallas, Texas as a young child. In Dallas, she attended Hyer Elementary School, Arch H. McCulloch Middle School, and Highland Park High School, graduating in 1982.

Mills graduated from the University of Cincinnati College Conservatory of Music in 1986 and received a Masters of Music at Yale University in 1988, where she studied with Doris Yarick-Cross.

She has won the Metropolitan Opera National Council Auditions, a Sullivan Role-Study Grant, the Maria Callas Debut Artist of the Year Award at Dallas Opera, the Washington Opera Singer of the Year, the Florida Grand Opera Singer of the Year, and the Diva Award from the Opera Company of Philadelphia.

She has collaborated with conductors including Yves Abel, Gary Bertini, Christoph Eschenbach, Jane Glover, Neemi Järvi, Fabio Luisi, Marc Minkowski, Kirill Petrenko, Markus Poschner and Ulf Schirmer.

== Career ==
Mills has performed frequently with the Metropolitan Opera, including her debut as Zdenka in Strauss’s Arabella, Micaela in Bizet’s Carmen and Mimì in Franco Zeffirelli’s staging of Puccini’s La Bohème as well as in Central Park for the Met in the Parks Series. Mills has repeated Mimì in Berlin, Detroit, Santiago de Chile, Antwerp (Belgium), Strasbourg, Geneva, and San Francisco. At the San Francisco Opera, she made her debut as an Adler Fellow as the 15-year-old Girl in Lulu and created the role of Cécile de Volanges in the world premiere of The Dangerous Liaisons. She has since sung in over eighteen productions with the company, including Mimì in La bohème, Pamina in Die Zauberflöte, Micaela in Carmen, and Zdenka in Arabella, among others.

Mills made her debut as Barbarina in Le Nozze di Figaro at the Houston Grand Opera as a member of the Houston Opera Studio in 1988, a position she left after being invited by Lotfi Mansouri to join the Adler Fellowship Program of the San Francisco Opera. She has also been a frequent guest at Dallas Opera, Washington Opera, Seattle Opera, Florida Grand Opera, Michigan Opera Theater, Opera Pacific, Opera Company of Philadelphia, Opera St. Louis in roles which have included Micaela, Musetta, Manon, Marguerite, Pamina, Mozart's Susanna, Arminda in La Finta Giardiniera, Ilia, and the title roles in Janáček's The Cunning Little Vixen, Carlisle Floyd's Susannah and Monteverdi's L'incoronazione di Poppea. She has sung the title roles in Rusalka and The Merry Widow, Gilda in Rigoletto and Tatiana in Eugene Onegin.

Mills made her European debut as Charpentier's Louise in Geneva in 1992, a success that resulted in invitations to the Wexford Festival in Ireland (Camille in Herold's Zampa) and the Bregenz Festival (Olga in Giordano's Fedora). The artist made her debut at the Paris Bastille in 1997 in the title role of Massenet's Manon, and was re-engaged in the same theatre to sing Micaela in Carmen as well as Marguerite in Faust and at the Palais Garnier as the Infantin in Zemlimsky's Der Zwerg. She has also been heard in Antwerp in Gounod's Roméo et Juliette, and Antonia in Les Contes d'Hoffmann in Santiago, Chile, as well as Marguerite in a new production of Gounod’s Faust at the Opéra de Lyon. She was also heard in the role of Rösschen in Spohr's," Faust," at the Theater an der Wien, formerly known as the Klangbogen Festspiele. In the course of the 2002/2003 season, she made her debut at the Berlin Staatsoper as Mimì, made her debut at the Arena de Verona as Micaela and sang Ilia in the controversial Opéra de Paris (Garnier) production of Idomeneo. She also appeared in Monte Carlo and Bilbao in the title role of Manon.

Mills sang her first Katya Kabanova at Theatre Saint Gallen, Switzerland to acclaim in 2004 and could also be heard that same year at the Theater an der Wien as Jitka in Smetana’s Dalibor. In 2006, she returned as Mimì at the Berlin Staatsoper and debuted the role of Nedda in I Pagliacci at Pittsburgh Opera. Mills sang the role of Sarah in the West Coast premiere of Jake Heggie's The End of the Affair at Seattle Opera, and sang Stella in André Previn's A Streetcar Named Desire at the Theater an der Wien. Mills originated the title role of Joan of Arc in Walter Braunfels' new opera Szenen aus dem Leben der Heiligen Johanna in a Christoph Schlingensief production at the Deutsche Oper in Berlin in 2008, which repeated in 2010 and 2012. Mills travelled to Seville in 2009, where she sang the Dutchess of Parma in Busoni's Dr. Faust. She made her role debut of Elsa in Lohengrin for the Staatsoper Stuttgart in 2010, and returned in 2011 for the title role of Katja Kabanova. In April 2014 she sang Elsa in Lohengrin again, this time in an Antony McDonald production in Warsaw. In 2013, the commercial recording of Lehar's rare operetta, Das Fürstenkind, was released, in which Mills sang the role of Mary Ann.

The International Herald Tribune reported she gave a "vibrant, emotionally fraught performance in the taxing role of Joan."

Mills lives in Berlin and is divorced from German actor, Markus Gertken, with whom she shares two children. She teaches voice in Berlin.

== Sources ==
- Holland, Bernard (April 4, 1989). "Review/Music; Tomorrow's Singers in Met Concert". The New York Times.
- Druckenbrod, Andrew (October 16, 2006). "Opera Review: 'Pagliacci' picks up pace in second act". Pittsburgh Post-Gazette. Archived from the original on April 29, 2008. (Includes a photo)
- Zwiebach, Michael (November 28, 2000). "OPERA REVIEW. Solid Singing, Unfocused Performance. Mary Mills (Pamina), Roberto Sacca (Tamino)". San Francisco Classical Voice. Archived from the original on April 29, 2008.
