= Elizabeth Caballero =

Cuban-American lyric soprano

- Born: Havana, Cuba
- Occupation: operatic soprano
- Years active: 1999-2023
- Website: www.elizabethcaballero.com

Elizabeth Caballero born in Havana, Cuba) is a Cuban-American lyric soprano.

She emigrated to the United States via the Mariel Boatlift. Raised in Miami, Florida, she studied piano as a child and later studied voice at Miami-Dade Community College. Transferring to the University of Miami, she studied with Lorine Buffington and earned a Bachelor of Music in Vocal Performance. Upon graduation, she studied privately with Miami voice teacher Manny Perez, and continues to work with him.

== Singing career ==
After the University of Miami, she participated in the Young Artist Program of the Florida Grand Opera for the 1999–2000 season. She was an Adler Fellow at the San Francisco Opera in 2004, as well as a member of the company's Merola Opera Program for two summers from 2001 to 2002. In 2001, she was a National Grand Finalist in the Metropolitan Opera National Council Auditions.

She has performed at the Metropolitan Opera, New York City Opera, Florida Grand Opera, San Francisco Opera, Seattle Opera, Carnegie Hall, the Teatro Verdi di Trieste, Berlin State Opera, Staatsoper Stuttgart, and many other venues in North & South America and Europe. In 2011, Caballero took part in Sabado Gigante, as a judge for Su Majestad La Voz, an American Idol-style voice competition for young opera singers.

The New York City Opera staged Daniel Catán’s Florencia en el Amazonas June 22–26, 2016 at Jazz at Lincoln Center’s Rose Theater. Reviewing the performance, James Jorden of The New York Observer wrote: "[in] the current offering of the resurrected New York City Opera ... every page of the score sails orgasmically over the top, as sinfully rich as molten caramel sauce... The reconstituted New York City Opera should be bursting with pride at the high level of quality extending across every aspect of this presentation... Among as strong a cast of vocalists as I’ve heard at NYCO in 20 years or more, the standout appropriately was Elizabeth Caballero as Florencia." Similarly, The Wall Street Journal opined that "Ms. Caballero is a find."

== Awards and honors ==
- 2001 National Grand Finalist for The Metropolitan Opera National Council Auditions (MONCA)
- 2002 Licia Albanese Puccini Foundation - 2nd Place Winner
- 2003 Gerda Lissner Foundation - Award Winner
- 2007 Diva Award - New York City Opera
- 2010 Named one of Miami's Most Influential People by the Miami New Times Magazine.
- 2011 Inducted into the Hall of Fame of Miami Dade College.
- 2013 Awarded Distinguished Alumni Award from University of Miami Frost School of Music.

== Repertoire ==
- Micaela (Carmen)
- Adina (L'elisir d'amore)
- Marguerite (Faust)
- Mimi and Musetta (La bohème)
- Nedda (Pagliacci)
- Fiordiligi (Cosi fan tutte)
- Donna Anna and Donna Elvira (Don Giovanni)
- Susanna and Contessa Almaviva (Le nozze di Figaro)
- Magda (La rondine)
- Violetta (La traviata)
- Liu (Turandot)
- Alice (Falstaff)
- Desdemona (Otello)
- Cio Cio San (Madama Butterfly)
- Florencia Grimaldi (Florencia en el Amazonas)
- Luisa (Luisa Miller)
- Amelia (Ballo in maschera)
- Tosca (Tosca)
