= Brian Asawa =

American countertenor (1966–2016)

- Born: October 1, 1966; Fullerton, California, U.S.
- Died: April 18, 2016 (aged 49); Mission Hills, California, U.S.
- Education: University of California, Santa Cruz; University of California, Los Angeles; University of Southern California
- Occupation: Opera singer
- Spouse: Keith Fisher
- Relatives: Ruth Asawa (aunt)

Brian Asawa (October 1, 1966 – April 18, 2016) was an American countertenor. Opera News said that "in his prime, Asawa was an electric performer, his fearless performing style supported by a voice of arresting beauty and expressivity."

== Early life ==
Brian Asawa was born in Fullerton, California, and grew up in Los Angeles. He sang in the choir at a Methodist church with a Japanese congregation. He began his studies as a piano major at the University of California, Santa Cruz, and then changed his studies to voice, studying under tenor Harlan Hokin. After two semesters there he transferred to UCLA.

In 1989, he began a master's degree in early-music interpretation at the University of Southern California where he was a pupil of the American lutenist James Tyler. However, Asawa never finished this program as his performance career began to take off.

== Career ==
His career was launched in 1991 when he became the first countertenor to win both the Metropolitan Opera National Council Auditions and an Adler Fellowship to the San Francisco Opera's Merola Opera Program. Of his performance at the Metropolitan Allan Kozinn wrote:

The most impressive of the winners was Brian Asawa, a countertenor with an unusually rich, rounded sound and the power to fill the house with no sacrifice in timbre or suppleness. Mr. Asawa's meltingly beautiful accounts of "Chiamo il mio ben cosi", from Gluck's Orfeo ed Euridice and "Welcome, Wanderer," from Britten's Midsummer Night's Dream, were subtly shaped and graced with a slight but fully expressive vibrato. There is not much call for countertenors at the Met. But the voice is flourishing in the early-music world, where singers of Mr. Asawa's musicality are needed.

Asawa made his professional opera debut at the San Francisco Opera in 1991 in Hans Werner Henze's Das verratene Meer where he also sang the Shepherd in Tosca and Oberon in Benjamin Britten's A Midsummer Night's Dream in 1992. While at the SFO he continued voice studies with Jane Randolph. He also made his first opera appearance in New York City in 1992 at the Mozart Bicentennial celebration at Lincoln Center, singing the title role in Mozart's Ascanio in Alba with the Mostly Mozart Festival Chorus and the New York Chamber Symphony under conductor Ádám Fischer.

In 1993, Asawa was awarded a career grant from the Richard Tucker Music Foundation and made his debut at the Santa Fe Opera as Arsamene in Handel's Xerxes. In The New York Times in January 1994 Alex Ross wrote: (Note: Later that year, reviewing a performance at New York's Mostly Mozart Festival conducted by Jane Glover, Kozinn wrote that the arias he sang "demand a direct emotionalism that is often beyond a countertenor's grasp. Mr. Asawa has no deficit in that regard, nor in questions of technique and coloristic subtlety. His voice is powerful and fully supported. He produced pianissimo high notes that floated easily through the large hall, and his more forceful ones showed no sign of strain. He used vibrato judiciously, and even the brightest edge of his palette has a velvety smoothness. All opera singing is manufactured, and the greatest singers are those who can create the illusion that it is not. Mr. Asawa's greatest asset, apart from sheer vocal beauty, is that both his tone and his expressive gestures sound entirely natural.")

In a remarkable recital ... Brian Asawa showed the kind of pure, effortless countertenor voice that comes along only once in a long while. It is hard to convey the uncanny effect of his full, fluid, lustrous tone, poised in the extreme upper register without the slightest strain.... His ventures into 20th-century music hold particular interest; although modern operatic roles for countertenors are few and far between ... a singer of this magnitude might cause all that to change.

Later that year, Asawa became the first countertenor to win the Operalia International Opera Competition, and made debuts at the Metropolitan Opera as the Voice of Apollo in Benjamin Britten's Death in Venice and at Glimmerglass Opera as Ottone in Claudio Monteverdi's L'incoronazione di Poppea. He was chosen Seattle Opera's Artist of the Year for the 1996–97 season.

Other career highlights included Orlofsky in Die Fledermaus at San Francisco Opera and San Diego Opera; Tolomeo in Giulio Cesare at Metropolitan Opera, Bordeaux, Opera Australia, Royal Opera House, Covent Garden, Paris Opera, Gran Teatre del Liceu in Barcelona, and Hamburg State Opera; Arsamene in Serse at Los Angeles, Cologne, Seattle, and Geneva; the title role in Admeto at Sydney, Montpellier and Halle; Baba The Turk in The Rake's Progress at San Francisco and for Swedish television; Fyodor in Boris Godunov at the Gran Teatre del Liceu, Endimione in La Calisto in Brussels, Oberon in A Midsummer Night's Dream at San Francisco, Houston, London Symphony Orchestra and Lyon; Ascanio in Ascanio in Alba at Lincoln Center; Farnace in Mitridate, re di Ponto at Opera National de Lyon and Paris Opera; Nero in L'incoronazione di Poppea in Sydney; Orfeo in Orfeo ed Euridice, La Speranza in L'Orfeo and L'Umana Fragilita/Anfinomo in Il ritorno d'Ulisse in patria at Netherlands Opera; David in Handel's Saul and Belize in the opera Angels in America by Péter Eötvös at the Bavarian State Opera, and Sesto in Giulio Cesare at COC in Toronto.

Asawa not only performed in opera, but was interested in expanding the art song literature for countertenor, supporting living composers by commissioning, performing, and recording works by them. Perhaps best known is the song cycle "Encountertenor", commissioned from Jake Heggie and premiered at London's Wigmore Hall in 1995 (later recording it for the RCA Red Seal label). Asawa also recorded a disc of songs by Ned Rorem with the Los Angeles Chamber Orchestra for RCA. More recently, Asawa sang San Francisco composer Kurt Erickson's "Four Arab Love Songs" (a mini-cycle of medieval Arab poems from Spain's Andalusia region dating from 900 to 1100 AD) on a premiere tour consisting of concerts in Long Beach, Los Angeles, and San Francisco, California and in Washington State. At the time of his death, Asawa was slated to premiere the song cycle "O Mistress Mine" (12 songs on texts from the plays of Shakespeare) written for him by Connecticut composer Juliana Hall at the Norfolk Chamber Music Festival in celebration of the 400th anniversary of Shakespeare's death.

In May 2014, Asawa performed a recital program with mezzo-soprano Diana Tash at the Festival de Mayo in Guadalajara, Mexico. In 2014, Asawa and Peter Somogyi established Asawa and Associates, an operatic artists' management agency.

== Personal life and death ==
Asawa was openly gay and believed this had helped him discover his voice type. "Heterosexual men don't feel comfortable singing in a treble register because it's not butch", he told an interviewer in 1998. "Gay men feel quite comfortable singing in their falsetto registers." He was married to Keith Fisher; the marriage ended in divorce.

Asawa was the nephew of sculptor Ruth Asawa. His cause of death was reported as heart and liver failure. He died in Mission Hills on April 18, 2016, at the age of 49.

== Recordings ==
Asawa's discography includes solo recital discs for RCA Victor Red Seal ranging from Dowland and Edmund Campion to Rachmaninoff and Ned Rorem. His opera recordings include Farnace in Mitridate for Decca, Arsamene in Serse for Conifer and Oberon in A Midsummer Night's Dream for Philips with the London Symphony Orchestra under Sir Colin Davis.

Asawa appeared on DVD in Ligeti's "Le Grand Macabre" Gran Teatre del Liceu, Barcelona, Monteverdi's "Il Ritorno d'Ulisse in Patria" Opus Arte, Mussorgsky's "Boris Godunov" Gran Teatre del Liceu, Barcelona, and Stravinsky's "The Rake's Progress" Kultur, as well as both a CD and DVD release of Handel's "Messiah" directed by Marc Minkowski. In 2014, Asawa and mezzo-soprano Diana Tash released an album of duets on the LML Music label that included works by Handel, Monteverdi, Purcell, A. Scarlatti and Marco da Gagliano.

== Discography ==
- The Dark Is My Delight and other 16th Century Lute Songs, RCA Red Seal, 1997
- The Faces of Love - The Songs of Jake Heggie, RCA, 1999
