= Appomattox (opera) =

2007 opera by Philip Glass

- Opera by Philip Glass
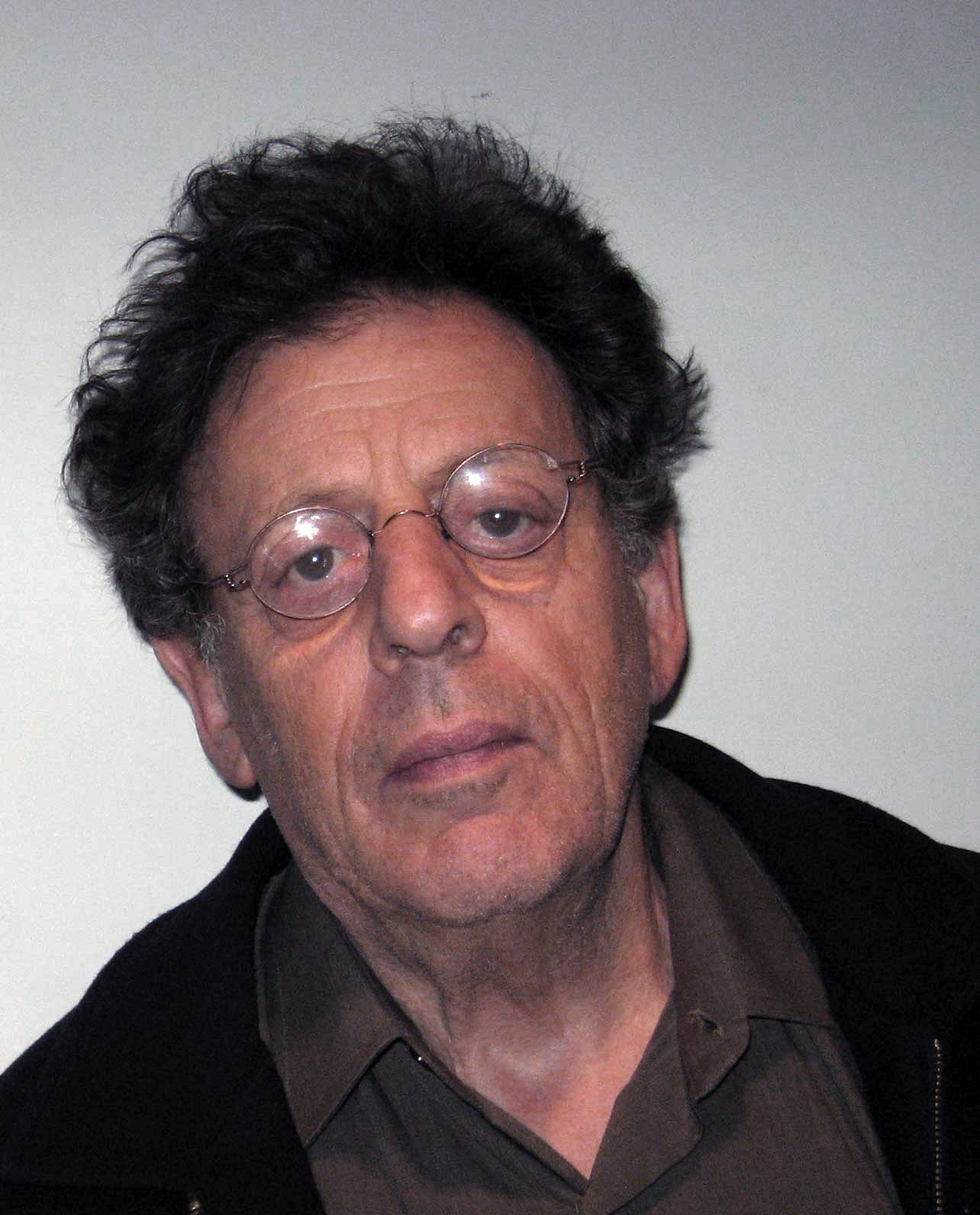
- Glass in 2007
- Librettist: Christopher Hampton
- Language: English
- Based on: American Civil War
- Premiere: 5 October 2007; San Francisco Opera

Appomattox is an opera in English based on the surrender ending the American Civil War, composed by Philip Glass, with a libretto by the playwright Christopher Hampton. The work had its world premiere at the San Francisco Opera on October 5, 2007, with a cast that included Dwayne Croft as Robert E. Lee and Andrew Shore as Ulysses S. Grant. The revised version commissioned and premiered by the Washington National Opera on November 14, 2015, expanded the work from 90 minutes to 160 minutes and added roles for Martin Luther King Jr. and Lyndon Johnson.

== Roles ==
Role	Voice type	Premiere cast, October 5, 2007 (Conductor: Dennis Russell Davies)
General Ulysses S. Grant	baritone	Andrew Shore
General Robert E. Lee	baritone	Dwayne Croft
Julia Dent Grant	soprano	Rhoslyn Jones
Mary Anna Custis Lee	soprano	Elza van den Heever
Agnes Lee	soprano	Ji Young Yang
T. Morris Chester	tenor	Noah Stewart
Abraham Lincoln	bass-baritone	Jeremy Galyon
Mary Todd Lincoln	soprano	Heidi Melton
Elizabeth Keckley	mezzo-soprano	Kendall Gladen
Edgar Ray Killen	bass-baritone	Philip Skinner
Edward Alexander	tenor	Chad Shelton
John Rawlins	baritone	Jere Torkelsen
General Howell Cobb	bass	John Minágro
Ely S. Parker	tenor	Richard Walker
Wilmer McLean	baritone	Torlef Borsting
Four Civil Rights Marchers	bass; tenor; soprano; mezzo-soprano	Frederick Matthews; Antoine Garth; Virginia Pluth; Claudia Siefer
An Old Man	bass	Frederick Matthews
A Young Man	tenor	Antoine Garth
Two Freed Slaves	tenor; bass	Alexander Taite; Anthony Russell
A Brigadier	tenor	Kevin Courtemanche
A Naval Officer	bass	William Pickersgill
Voice of a Confederate Soldier	baritone	David Kekuewa
A Captain	bass	William Pickersgill
Chorus of Union and Confederate Soldiers, Citizens of Richmond and Appomattox, Slaves and Women

== Synopsis (2007 version) ==
Time: The final days of the American Civil War.

=== Prologue ===
Julia Dent Grant sings of her fears for her husband, Ulysses, and her sense of foreboding. She is soon joined by Mary Anna Custis Lee and her daughter, Eleanor Agnes Lee, who worry for their way of life and hope the war will be over soon. Mary Todd Lincoln appears and asks her black servant Elizabeth Keckley to interpret a nightmare her husband, the President, has had. All sing of the sorrows of war and the hope that this will be the last, joined by a female chorus who carry pictures of their loved ones killed in the war.

=== Act 1 ===
Scene 1: The days leading up to Robert E. Lee's surrender

While Abraham Lincoln and Ulysses S. Grant are aboard his floating headquarters on the Potomac, the President and Grant outline a plan to end the war and discuss the generous terms of surrender to be offered to Lee. Their wives arrive, Mrs. Lincoln voicing petty grievances, while Mrs. Grant is steadfast and calm. News of a successful retaking of a Confederate-held fort is brought in by Brigadier General John Rawlins and Colonel Ely S. Parker of the day's battle; Grant then orders the final assault on Richmond. The scene ends with an actual Civil War campfire song. "Tenting on the Old Camp Ground", sung by both armies as Grant and Robert E. Lee watch the sunset from their different offices.

Scene 2: the offices of General Lee

Mrs. Lee rejects her husband's advice to flee Richmond before the coming battle. Lee reflects on his reason for joining the Confederacy despite having been offered the leadership of the Union forces: his invincible loyalty to his home state of Virginia. General Howell Cobb arrives to give a report and confronts Lee over a bill he supports, one that will recruit slaves to fight for the Confederacy, a bill that Cobb believes undermines the entire revolution: If slaves make good soldiers, where does that leave the theory of slavery? Lee responds that his business is war, not theorizing.

Scene 3

Julia Grant, on the eve of the Union's attack on Richmond, reflects on the hard years of her husband's earlier life, including his business failures and alcoholism, but she recalls her mother's prophecy that he would rise to be the highest in the land. Now she worries about the horrible strain the long, bloody war has put on him. Grant assures her that the seemingly endless killing will soon be over.

Scene 4: the destruction of Richmond

A chorus of refugees flees and sings between bomb blasts. Mrs. Lee, remaining in her home, watches as the residents of Richmond flee and burn everything they own so as to not leave anything behind for the Union army. She and Agnes reflect on the horrors of war. A regiment of black Union soldiers enters and sing a marching tune, a variation of the Marching Song of the First Arkansas. The black reporter T. Morris Chester writes a triumphant report to his newspaper while sitting in the speaker's chair of the House of Representatives. President Lincoln arrives and meets a throng of newly freed slaves. When one of them falls to her knees in front of him, he lifts her up telling her to kneel only to God. The slaves sing a hymn in praise of Lincoln. Mrs. Lee meets with Brig. General Rawlins, and expresses her outrage at having a black soldier as sentry in her occupied house. The sentry is to be replaced with a white soldier.

Scene 5: the exchange of letters between Lee and Grant after the taking of Richmond

Grant proposes that Lee surrender to avoid further bloodshed. Lee's initial response is equivocal, only inquiring as to the terms Grant might propose, and later suggesting they meet to discuss "peace" rather than "surrender". But when Lee receives news of his encircled army's failed breakout attempt, he realizes his options are disappearing. His aide, Brig. General Edward Alexander, proposes a radical change of strategy: guerrilla warfare. Lee rejects the stratagem, saying that the soldiers would have to revert to robbing and plundering just to subsist. With no remaining alternative, Lee writes to Grant and asks for a meeting to discuss surrender. The full, crushing weight of his decision weighs upon him as he accepts the reality of defeat.

=== Act 2 ===
The Appomattox Court House, Virginia

For the April 9, 1865, meeting to negotiate the surrender, the property is being prepared. Lee arrives impeccably dressed, while Grant in his haste appears in a battered, stained uniform. After polite reminiscence about their past acquaintance, Lee finally raises the subject of surrender. Grant proposes the broader terms and proceeds to write them down.

Their discussion is interrupted by a sudden flash-forward to early morning, five days later. Mrs. Lincoln tells Elizabeth Keckley about another of the president's nightmares in which he witnessed his own funeral after being killed by an assassin. Keckley interprets the dream as the death of the war, not the President. Mrs. Lincoln tells of another dream, in which the president rode alone on a great ship to a vague, distant shore. This time, Keckley has no answer and rushes from the room. Mrs. Lincoln sees a vision of a funeral procession bearing a flag-draped coffin, and sees herself following it. She screams and collapses, and the action returns to the treaty signing.

Grant proposes—to Lee's great relief—that all officers and men be allowed to return to their homes after handing over their arms. Lee requests a moment to look over the terms.

The action flashes forward again, to 1873 in Colfax, Louisiana. T. Morris Chester enters and, obviously traumatized, reports the infamous Colfax massacre, in which a hundred black militiamen were cut down by the Ku Klux Klan and White League.

Grant accedes to Lee's request that all his men, not just the officers, be allowed to keep their horses, so that they can return home to work their farms. The terms are set down in ink by Colonel Ely Parker, the only Native American present.

The scene flashes forward again, this time to 1965. Four Civil Rights Marchers enter and, with the chorus, sing "The Ballad of Jimmie Lee", a folk song telling of the murder of Jimmie Lee Jackson, and set out on the Selma to Montgomery marches.

The meeting concludes as Lee signs the letter accepting the terms, and the generals shake hands. After Lee bows and leaves, he approaches his troops and confirms the surrender; they can go home now, and if they are as good citizens as they were as soldiers, then he will be proud of them.

As the generals depart, soldiers and civilians advance. The McLean household is systematically cleared by souvenir hunters.

The action flashes forward one last time, to the present day. Edgar Ray Killen, a Klan member now in jail for his role in the murders of Chaney, Goodman, and Schwerner in 1964, appears. Now an old man who uses a wheelchair, he sings in short, barking phrases of his pride in ordering the death of two Jewish civil rights workers and their black driver, and relives the murder in enthusiastic detail. His horrible recollection over, he disappears.

=== Epilogue ===
Julia Grant sorrowfully realizes that the War was not the last, as she has hoped, and that mankind will forever fight and kill. She leads the Women's Chorus in a wordless lament to the sorrow of war.
