= Gregory Carroll (tenor) =

American opera singer

Gregory Carroll (July 9, 1977, Des Moines, Washington — July 2, 2013, Seattle) was an American tenor who had an active international career in operas and concerts during the early 21st century. In 2009 he won both second place and the Wagner Prize in the Irene Dalis International Vocal Competition. That same year he was awarded the Metropolitan Opera's Zimmerman Career Grant. In 2010 he was the recipient of William O. Cord Memorial Grant from the Wagner Society of Northern California.

== Life and career ==
Carroll earned a Bachelor of Music degree from Western Washington University and Master of Music degree in vocal performance from the University of Washington. He then trained at the San Francisco Opera's Merola Opera Program. He made his professional opera debut in 2010 as Canio in Pagliacci with the Spokane Opera. Later that year he appeared as Bacchus in Strauss' Ariadne auf Naxos with the Seattle Opera, Rodolfo in Verdi's Luisa Miller with the Puget Sound Opera, and sang Canio again for his debut with Opera Cleveland.

In 2011 Carroll sang Rodolfo again for his debut with Chautauqua Opera, performed Canio with Opera Lyra Ottawa, and gave his first performance outside the United States as the First Armed Man in The Magic Flute with the Canadian Opera Company. In 2012 he made his debut at the Lyric Opera of Chicago as Radamès in Verdi's Aida and sang the same role for his European debut at the Norwegian National Opera. He also returned that year to the Chautauqua Opera as Edgardo in Donizetti's Lucia di Lammermoor and made his debut at the Portland Opera as Alfred in Die Fledermaus.

Carroll died suddenly and unexpectedly of a heart attack at the age of 35 in Seattle. Opera News magazine described him "as an extremely promising heldentenor".
