= Kevin Anderson (tenor) =

American operatic tenor

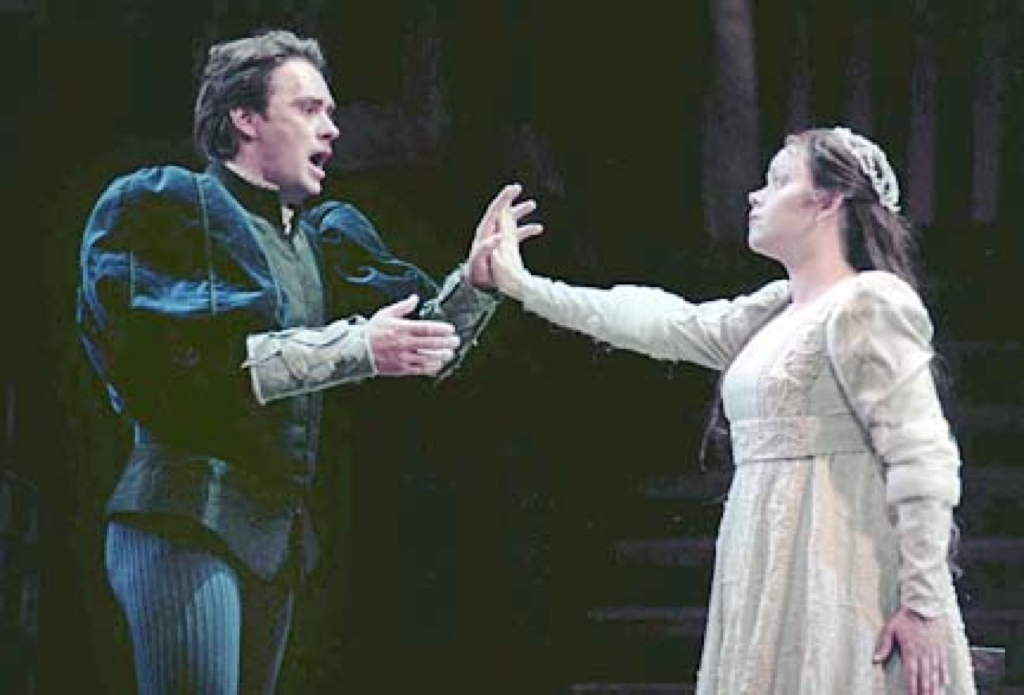
Anderson and his wife, Jami Rogers-Anderson, in Roméo et Juliette, Hawaii Opera 1998

Kevin Paul Anderson is an American operatic tenor. He has had a national and international singing career since the late 1980s, and in 1988 appeared as Don Alvar alongside Plácido Domingo and Shirley Verrett in the San Francisco Opera's televised production of L'Africaine.

== Early life and education ==
Born in Moline, Illinois, Anderson began singing as a member of the Moline Boys Choir. After a move in 1976 to Denver during his high school years, he continued his vocal studies and made his professional debut at 19 with Central City Opera. He earned a bachelor's degree in music performance from University of Wyoming and graduate studies at the University of North Texas College of Music. He was an intern with the San Francisco Opera in the Merola program in 1983 and 1984 and became an Adler Fellow in 1989. He was a Metropolitan Opera National Council Auditions finalist and a grantee of the Sullivan Foundation.

== Career ==
Anderson has performed with many leading opera companies worldwide, including in productions of Street Scene, Countess Maritza, Falstaff, La rondine, and Jenůfa. In 1994 he performed the title role of Candide at Opera Theatre of Saint Louis in the American stage premiere of Bernstein's 1989 revised opera-house version; Allan Kozinn of the New York Times lauded his performance, stating "Kevin Anderson made Candide's slow, naively soul-baring arias pictures of lyrical grace." Anderson also toured the U.S. with Faye Dunaway in Terrence McNally's Master Class, and opened the Edinburgh Festival in Show Boat under John McGlinn.

== Recordings ==
Anderson's recordings include:

- L'Africaine (1988) – Don Alvar
- Six Characters in Search of an Author (1990) – The Director
- A Little Night Music for New York City Opera (1990) – Henrik
- Sondheim: A Celebration at Carnegie Hall (1993)

== Personal life ==
Anderson lives in Knoxville, Tennessee. He is married to soprano Jami Rogers-Anderson.
