= Kurt Herbert Adler =

Austrian-born American conductor and opera house director (1905 - 1988)

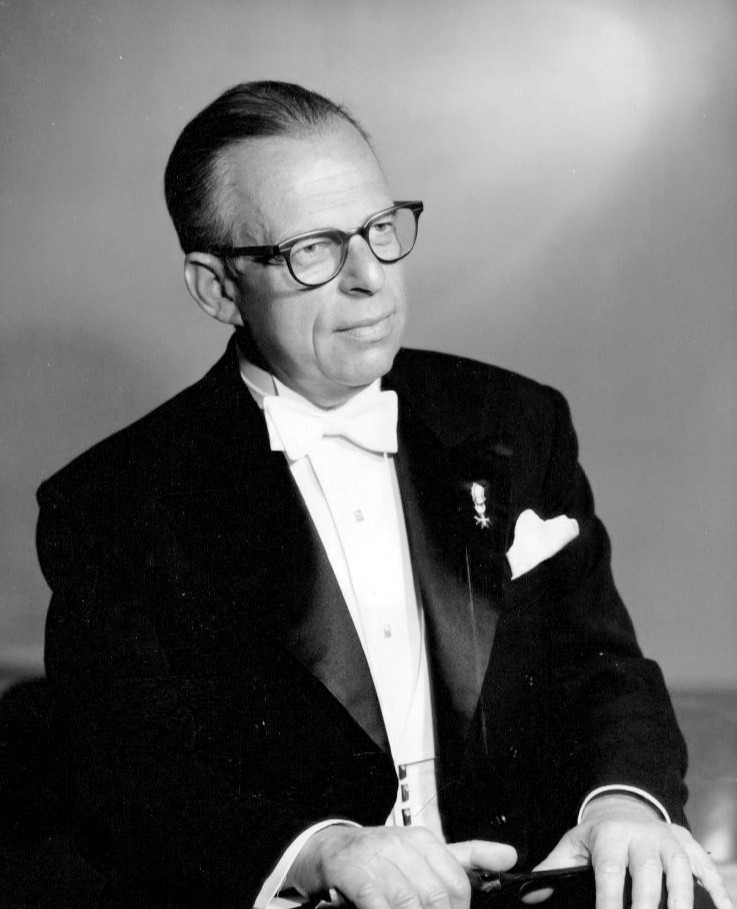
Adler in 1966

Kurt Herbert Adler (April 2, 1905 – February 9, 1988) was an Austrian–American conductor and opera house director.

== Biography ==
Adler was born in Vienna, Austria, to a Jewish family; his mother, Ida Bauer, was one of the first patients of Sigmund Freud. His work in the field of music led him to become the assistant to Arturo Toscanini at the Salzburg Festival in 1936 and he also worked in Italy. Following the Nazi occupation of Austria in 1938, as a Jew he was forced to leave and went to the Chicago City Opera Company as assistant chorus director where he worked for five years.

Gaetano Merola, then General Director of the San Francisco Opera, heard of him and, over the telephone, invited him to the San Francisco Opera in 1943 as chorus director.

In the following ten years, he took on more and more administrative details as Merola's health and energy diminished. While Adler was not the Board's natural choice to replace Merola at the time of his death in 1953, after three months of acting as artistic director and with the help of its president, Robert Watt Miller, Adler was confirmed as General Director.

Adler's aims in taking over the company were several. One was to expand the season and, by the 1969 season, eleven operas were given five or six performances each on average while the season ran to late November. He was tireless in seeking out up-and-coming new singers, whether American or European, by attending performances in both major and minor opera houses. Thirdly, his interest in developing stronger connections to opera stage directors in an attempt to strengthen the dramatic and theatrical elements of the works, led to a long relationship with Jean-Pierre Ponnelle.

Other innovations included the Merola Opera Program named after the founder of the San Francisco Opera, and "Opera in the Park", which the latter, from 1973, has been an annual free concert in Golden Gate Park on the Sunday following opening night of the fall season (which was televised on KQED and simulcasted in stereo on their radio station KQED-FM). The first of those concerts featured tenor Luciano Pavarotti and soprano Licia Albanese.

He was not always regarded as an easy person to work for, but his principal achievements in San Francisco were to greatly raise the standards of the opera company and "to attract a stunning galaxy of European stars, some at the beginning of their careers, to a city at the other end of the world, often at significantly lower salaries than New York or Chicago would offer".

He retired in late December 1981 and continued to conduct and be involved with music until his death in Ross, California in 1988.

The Adler Fellowship program was started in his name by Terence A. McEwen to support young singers managed by the San Francisco Opera.

His son Ronald H. Adler is an opera director and has been artistic director at the Bavarian State Opera (2001–08) and the Berlin State Opera (2008–11).
