= Raehann Bryce-Davis =

American opera singer

Raehann Bryce-Davis (born May 17, 1986) is an American operatic mezzo-soprano and producer. Bryce-Davis was born in Mexico and raised in Keene, Texas. She attended the University of Texas at Arlington and the Manhattan School of Music, where she was a student of Cynthia Hoffmann. She is a winner of the 2018 George London Award at the George London Competition, the 2017 Concorso Lirico di Portofino, the 2016 Richard F. Gold Career Grant from Merola Opera Program, the 2015 International Hilde Zadek Competition in Vienna and the 2015 Sedat Gürel - Güzin Gürel International Voice Competition in Istanbul. Bryce-Davis has been acclaimed across Europe and North America for her portrayals of Verdi roles such as Eboli, Azucena, and Preziosilla, as well as bel canto heroines such as Leonora from Donizetti's La Favorite and Sara in Roberto Devereux. In concert, solo highlights include performances of Verdi's Requiem at Carnegie Hall with the Oratorio Society of New York, conducted by Kent Tritle, Verdi's Requiem with the Montreal Symphony Orchestra under Kent Nagano, Elgar's Sea Pictures at the Vienna Musikverein with Jun Märkl, and a Grammy-nominated performance of Pulitzer Prize-winning Paul Moravec and Mark Campbell's Sanctuary Road.

In 2022, Bryce-Davis made house and role debuts at the Metropolitan Opera as Baba the Turk in The Rake's Progress, at La Monnaie, Brussels, as La Zia Principessa in Suor Angelica, and at Washington National Opera as Azucena in Il trovatore.

In 2021, she returned to both Los Angeles Opera and the Staatstheater Nürnberg as Azucena, and gave solo recitals at both the Tuesday Musical Club in San Antonio, Texas, with pianist Heeyoung Choi, and for the Merola Opera Program with pianist Jeanne-Minette Cilliers.

In 2020, during the COVID-19 pandemic, she produced the music video "To the Afflicted" which became an official video for World Opera Day, and in 2021 she served as executive producer, concept creator, and performer in the award-winning digital short "Brown Sounds" with the LA Opera and Aural Compass Projects.

Bryce-Davis is a co-founder of the Black Opera Alliance.
