= The Dangerous Liaisons =

Opera

The Dangerous Liaisons is an opera in two acts and eight scenes, with music by Conrad Susa to an English libretto by Philip Littell. It is based on the 1782 novel Les Liaisons dangereuses by Pierre Choderlos de Laclos. The opera has set numbers with recitative and spoken dialog. It is set in France in the 18th century. The opera received its first performance by the San Francisco Opera on 10 September 1994, with stage direction by Colin Graham and Donald Runnicles as the conductor. The world-premiere cast included Thomas Hampson as Valmont, Frederica von Stade as Merteuil, David Hobson as Chevalier de Danceny, Renée Fleming as Tourvel and Mary Mills as Cécile de Volanges. The opera was performed at Washington Opera in March 1998. The San Francisco Opera production was also aired on the American PBS television network's Great Performances. Albany Records released an audio recording of a performance by Manhattan School of Music Opera Theater in 2016.

Other notable performances include a 2008 production by Dicapo Opera Theater in New York City, featuring an adaptation for reduced forces.

== Roles ==
- Marquise de Merteuil (mezzo-soprano)
- Vicomte de Valmont (baritone)
- Madame de Tourvel (soprano)
- Cécile de Volanges (soprano)
- Madame de Rosemonde (Soprano)
- Madame de Volanges (mezzo-soprano)
- Chevalier de Danceny (tenor)
- Josephine, maid to Cécile
- Emilie, a prostitute
- Monsieur Bertrand, an attorney (Baritone)
- Victoire, maid to Madame de Merteuil (Mezzo-Soprano)
- Azolan, valet to Vicomte de Valmont
- Julie, maid to Madame de Tourvel
- Father Anselm
- Duel Second Number 1
- Duel Second Number 2
- A maid
- A footman

== Synopsis ==
Act I

- Scene 1 (at the chateau of Madame de Rosemonde, outside Paris)
- Scene 2 (various bedrooms)
- Scene 3 (a wood on the estate of Rosemonde)

Act II

- Scene 1 (bedroom of Madame de Merteuil, Paris)
- Scene 2 (bedroom of Vicomte de Valmont)
- Scene 3 (pleasure pavilion of Madame de Merteuil)
- Scene 4 (A convent / the park at Vincennes)
- Scene 5 (scene of Madame de Merteuil)
