= A Streetcar Named Desire (opera) =

Opera by André Previn

- Opera by André Previn
- A Streetcar Named Desire (DVD cover of original production)
- Librettist: Philip Littell
- Language: English
- Based on: A Streetcar Named Desire by Tennessee Williams
- Premiere: 19 September 1998; War Memorial Opera House, San Francisco

A Streetcar Named Desire is an opera composed by André Previn in 1995 with a libretto by Philip Littell. It is based on the play of the same name by Tennessee Williams.

The opera received its premiere at the San Francisco Opera, September 19 – October 11, 1998. It was conducted by André Previn and directed by Colin Graham, with sets by Michael Yeargan. It quickly developed into one of the most widely played contemporary operas. The original production was released on CD and DVD.

== Cast ==
- Blanche DuBois – Renée Fleming
- Stanley Kowalski – Rod Gilfry
- Stella Kowalski – Elizabeth Futral
- Harold "Mitch" Mitchell – Anthony Dean Griffey
- Eunice Hubbell – Judith Forst
- Steve Hubbell – Matthew Lord
- Newspaper Collector – Jeffrey Lentz
- The Mexican – Josepha Gayer
- Pablo Gonzales – Luis Oropeza
- The Doctor – Ray Reinhardt
- The Nurse – Lynne Soffer

== Reception ==
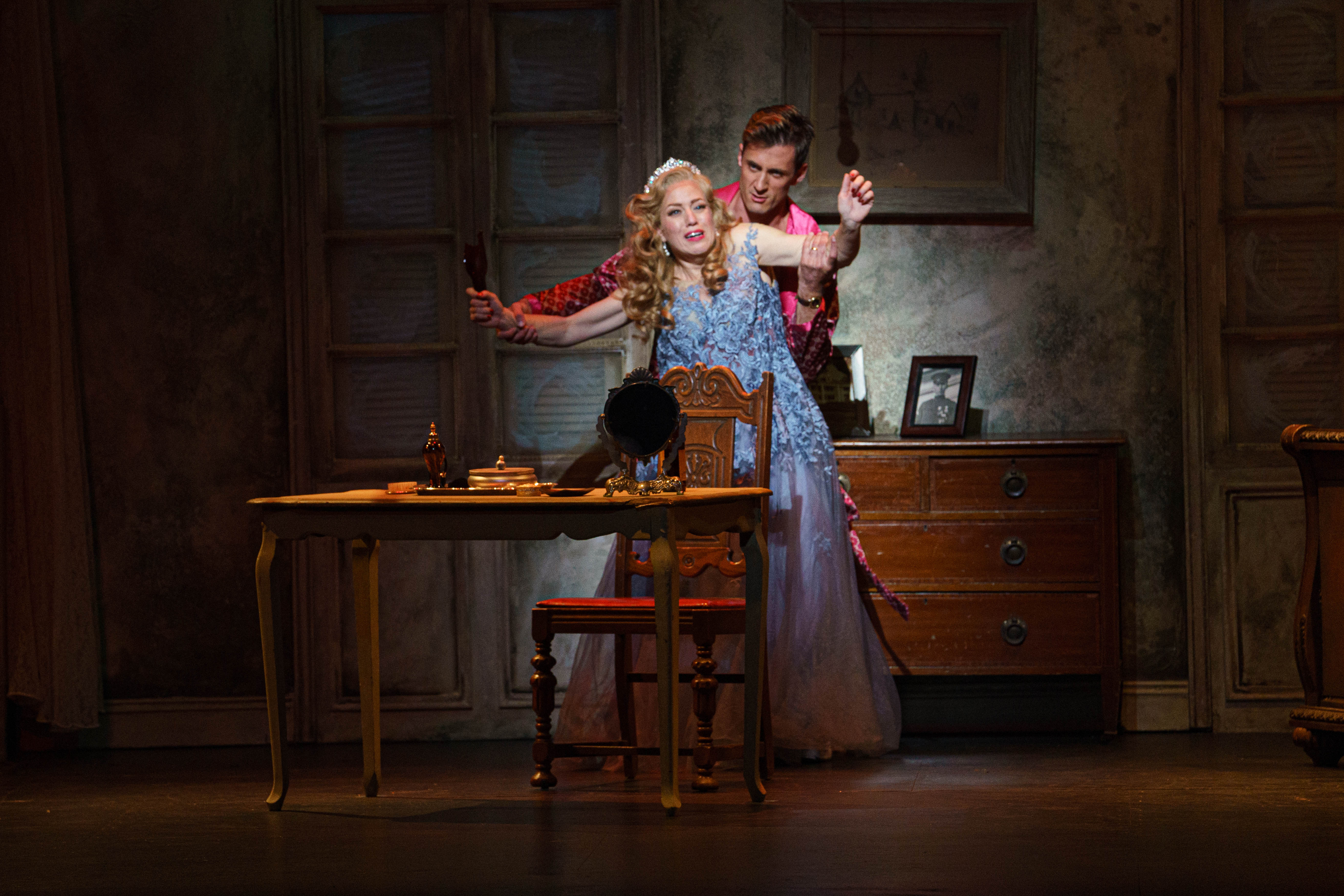
Scene from act 3 of a production at Florida Grand Opera, 2021

In a review of the premiere in The New York Times, Bernard Holland observed:

A Streetcar Named Desire is so operatic as a play that one wonders why more than 50 years have passed since its Broadway opening with no opera of note being made of it. ... The new setting of Tennessee Williams's play, with music by André Previn and a libretto by Philip Littell, answered a few questions and asked others.... First of all, it sings very well. Mr. Previn has a fine ear for voices. He knows how to flatter and coax it and send it gracefully from one musical episode to the next ... one had the impression that Mr. Previn had been writing for the musical theater all his life.

Regarding the music, Holland noted:

There are angry clashes of harmony and key, many Straussian gestures, sweet-as-honey popular melody and the kinds of corporate noodling and mumbling among the strings native to a Ligeti or a Penderecki. Mr. Previn is not ashamed to incorporate Hollywood code words, especially the wailing thrusts of saxophone, trumpet and clarinet to introduce dissolution and lurid sex.

Holland commented on the principal singers as follows:

[A]s beautifully as Renée Fleming sings and as assiduously as she pursues the part, she leaves a hole in the opera that nothing around it can fill. Ms. Fleming does everything an opera singer can do, but I am not sure that Blanche is a character that opera can ever reach. As Stanley in a baritone part, Rodney Gilfry sings strongly and summons the necessary physical menace. Elizabeth Futral made Stella a satisfying operatic character (and) Anthony Dean Griffey sang touchingly and surely in the tenor role of Mitch.

Other reviews have criticized the lengthy libretto (reportedly the Williams estate required a close following of the play), and music that does not advance the characters or action, and does not much suggest New Orleans of the 1940s. A shorter version was produced in San Francisco in 2007.

== Other performances ==
Subsequent U.S. performances of A Streetcar Named Desire were given in New Orleans (1999–2000); San Diego (2000); Washington, D.C., Los Angeles, and Austin, Texas (2002); University of Kentucky Opera Theatre (2003), Virginia Opera and Lyric Opera of Chicago (2013), St. Louis (2014), Kentucky Opera and Cleveland (2015), Hawaii Opera Theatre (2017), and Opera Company of Middlebury (2018).

The European premiere took place at the Opéra national du Rhin, Strasbourg, France. The opera had its London premiere in June 2003 in a semi-staged version at the Barbican, with the London Symphony Orchestra conducted by Prévin. Much of the original cast reprised their roles, and Janice Watson replaced Elizabeth Futral as Stella.

Opera Ireland presented the work in November 2006 in Dublin. Theater an der Wien, Vienna, performed the opera in 2007, with a cast including Janice Watson as Blanche, Teddy Tahu Rhodes as Stanley, Mary Mills as Stella and Simon O'Neill as Mitch. The Australian premiere, directed by Bruce Beresford, was produced by Opera Australia in August 2007 with Yvonne Kenny as Blanche, Teddy Tahu Rhodes as Stanley, Antoinette Halloran as Stella, and Stuart Skelton as Mitch.

Other performances have been given at the Theater St. Gallen, Switzerland; Giessen, Germany; Turin, Italy; and Tokyo, Japan. In 2017 the first performance in any language other than the original English was given in German at Stralsund and Greifswald (Theatre of West Pomerania), conducted by Florian Csizmadia and staged by Horst Kupich.
