= Mark Delavan =

American operatic bass-baritone

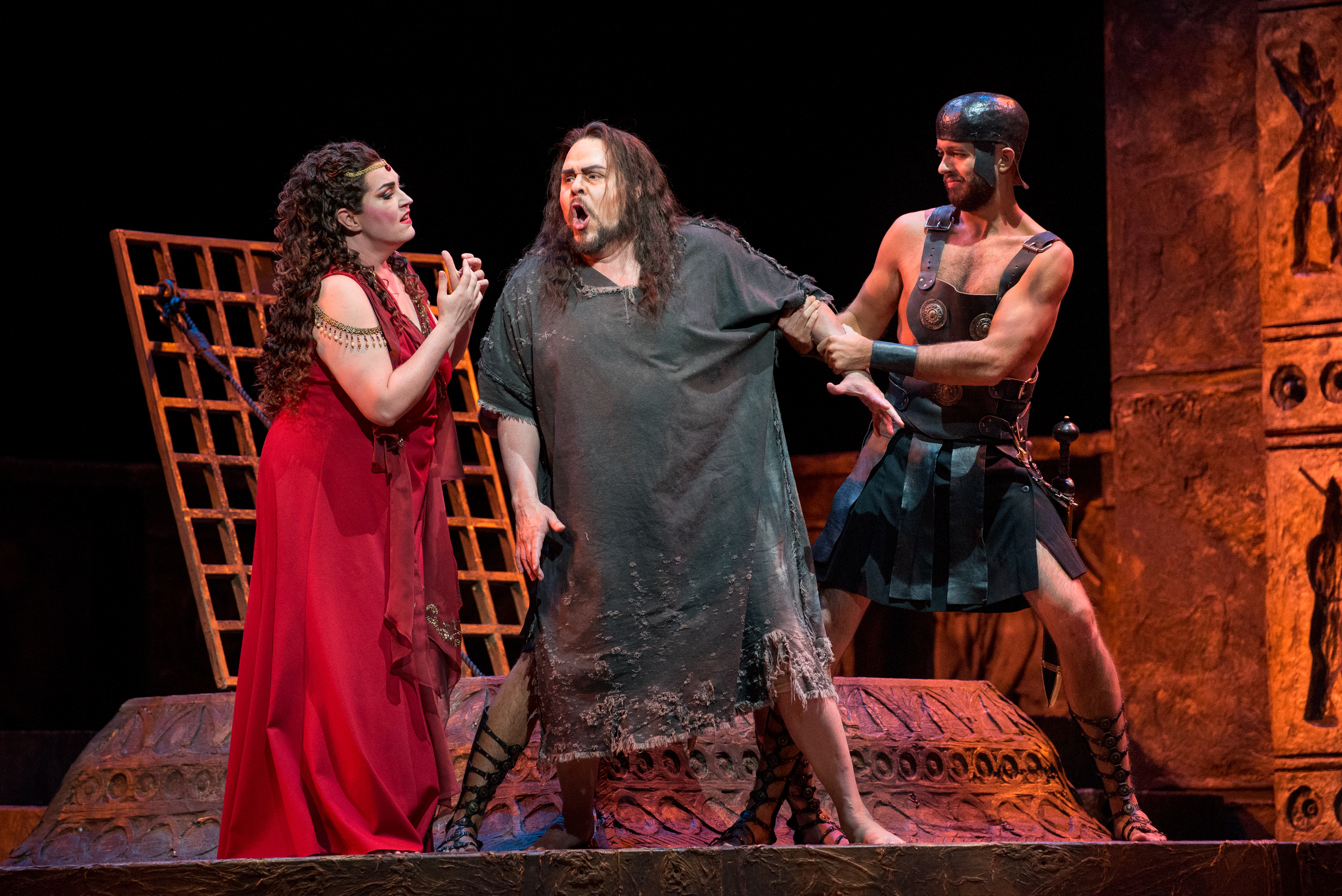
Mark Delavan as Jochanaan in Strauss' Salome Op. 54

Mark Delavan is an American operatic bass-baritone. He was a national finalist of the Metropolitan Opera auditions and an Adler Fellow with the San Francisco Opera.

== Early life ==
His mother was a soprano and his father was an Opera singer, conductor, director, composer and teacher. He had done some juvenile roles but only decided to pursue a musical career after graduating from Grand Canyon College in Phoenix, Arizona with a degree in graphic arts. At age 21, he enrolled in the music program at Oral Roberts University in Tulsa where his parents were teaching.

== Professional career ==
His first professional experience was at the North Carolina Opera in 1983. In 1986, he was at the San Francisco Opera in a small role in Giuseppe Verdi's Don Carlos. He spent the next three years performing in numerous comprimario roles with the company. After leaving San Francisco, he got work but he received lukewarm reviews that he felt he didn't deserve. He walked out of a job at the Sarasota Opera. The musical director was relieved to see him go: "I've never met a guy who has angered my entire company like this."

Delavan openly admits to having "addictive issues" during this time. In the mid 1990s, his father died, he lost his marriage and wound up taking a janitorial job and sleeping in the back room of the Opera Music Theater International in Newark, New Jersey, where Jerome Hines had invited him to enroll in a young artists' program.

His first big break after that was singing for Frank Corsaro, who said "That's about the best Credo I've ever heard." Delavan was then invited to sing at the New York City Opera where he stayed for the next nine years playing most of the major baritone roles from Verdi, Puccini, Wagner and Richard Strauss. His profile has been rising ever since.

In 2004, the NYCO asked him what he wanted to do and he suggested an Operatic production of Sweeney Todd opposite Elaine Paige for which he received mostly positive reviews for his "hulking presence" and "striking physicality." For Variety, Charles Isherwood wrote: "Delavan’s Sweeney suggested Frankenstein’s monster more than anything else." In TheaterMania, Michael Portantiere declared: "If Delavan does not quite possess the top-notch musical theater acting skills of such Sweeneys as Len Cariou and George Hearn, he's still a force to be reckoned with." Others went on to describe Delavan's voice as "extraordinarily deep and resonant".

He returned to San Francisco to sing Scarpia in Giacomo Puccini's Tosca (2004, with Carol Vaness in the title role) and Wotan in Richard Wagner's The Ring Cycle (2008, 2010, and 2011). In 2001 he made his debut at the Metropolitan Opera as Amonasro in Verdi's Aida with Deborah Voigt in the title role, Luciano Pavarotti as Radamès, Olga Borodina as Amneris, and James Levine conducting. He has since been heard at the Met as Alfio in Pietro Mascagni's Cavalleria rusticana, Carlo Gérard in Andrea Chénier, Count Tomsky in The Queen of Spades, Don Carlo in Verdi's La Forza del Destino, the Messenger in Richard Strauss' Die Frau ohne Schatten, Scarpia, and the title roles in Verdi's Nabucco, Verdi's Rigoletto, and Verdi's Simon Boccanegra.

Delavan has also sung roles with other leading American companies like the Houston Grand Opera, the Los Angeles Opera, the Lyric Opera of Chicago, the New York City Opera, the Opera Company of Philadelphia, the Pittsburgh Opera, the Santa Fe Opera, and the Washington National Opera. Outside of the United States, he has made appearances at the Bavarian State Opera, the Berlin State Opera, the Deutsche Oper Berlin, the Liceu, the Prague National Theatre, and the Royal Opera House in London among others.

== Personal life ==
In addition to his son from his first marriage, Delavan has three sons with his wife pianist Karen Linstedt Delavan.
