= Opera Company of Middlebury =

American opera company

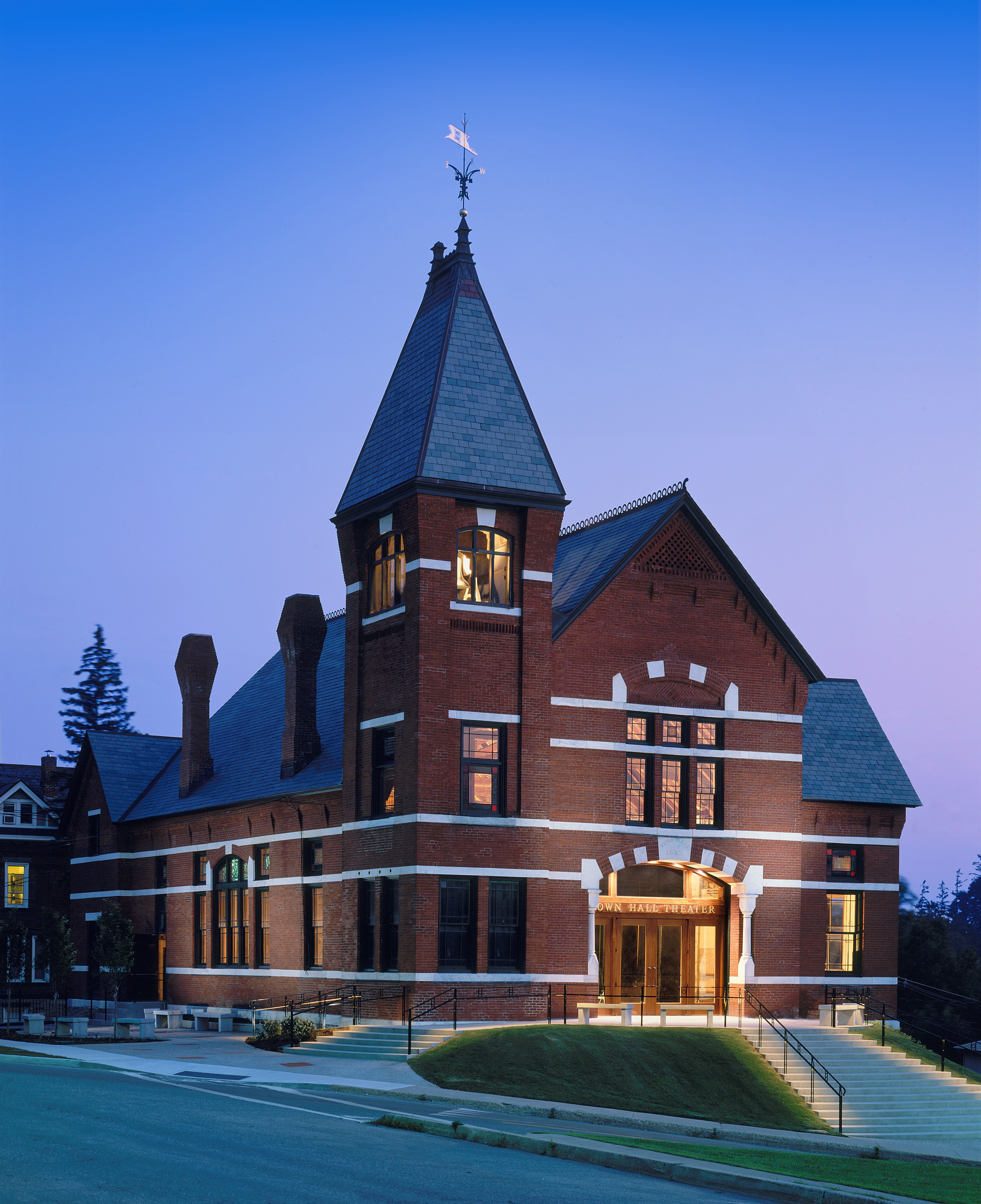
Town Hall Theater, Home of the Opera Company of Middlebury

Opera Company of Middlebury (OCM) is an American opera company based in Middlebury, Vermont. It was founded in 2004.

OCM presents two operas per year at Town Hall Theatre, a venue that OCM played "a significant role" in helping restore. All productions are presented in their original language with surtitles projected over the stage.

In October 2018 OCM took Donizetti's L'Elisir d'Amore on tour to three Vermont cities. OCM also presents the Metropolitan Opera HD Broadcasts in conjunction with Town Hall Theatre; each opera is preceded an hour ahead by a talk about it by an OCM board member.

== History ==
The company was established in 2004. The OCM's first performance was Bizet's Carmen, which was adapted by Douglas Anderson and featured Meredith Parsons McComb, Stephanie Weiss, Yonghoon Lee and Steven Marking. Lee returned the following year in the company's second production, Tosca, with Beth Thompson.

The Town Hall Theatre underwent a $5 million renovation from 2005 to 2008. During the renovation, the OCM shifted its performances to the Vergennes Opera House and artist Fran Bull's Brandon studio. The Company returned to the Town Hall Theatre in June 2008 with Puccini's La bohème .

The company now annually presents two productions (in June and October) under the artistic direction of Douglas Anderson. Its production manager is Mary Longey. After their 2019 production of Tosca the OCM did not do any live performances until their production of The Maid of Orleans in October 2021 because of the COVID-19 pandemic. For 2020, OCM produced a version of Candide which was filmed in sections with videographer Tim Joy, and included narration by former Vermont Governor Jim Douglas.

== Past productions ==
- Carmen, 2004 (adapted and abridged)
- Tosca, 2005 (adapted and abridged)
- A Dinner Engagement, 2006
- A Little Night Music, 2007
- La Bohème, 2008
- The Barber of Seville, 2009
- The Pearl Fishers, 2010
- La Rondine, 2011
- Thaïs, 2012
- Madama Butterfly, 2012
- Eugene Onegin, 2013
- The Italian Girl in Algiers, 2014
- La Traviata, 2014
- Turandot, 2015
- Dido and Aeneas, 2015
- Macbeth, 2016
- The Magic Flute, 2016
- Il Trittico, 2017
- L'Elisir d'Amore, 2017
- A Streetcar Named Desire, 2018
- Tosca, 2019
- Candide, 2021
- The Maid of Orleans, 2021
