= Terence A. McEwen =

Canadian opera manager

Terence A. McEwen (13 April 1929 – 14 September 1998) was a Canadian opera manager.

== Upbringing and early career ==
Though born in Thunder Bay, Ontario, McEwen grew up in the Montreal area where he learned to love opera and listened to the Met broadcasts. Aged fourteen, he made a trip to New York one winter break to hear several of his favourite operas, which included Bidu Sayão and Jussi Björling in Rigoletto. As a singer, Sayão was forever to remain his passion, one which was accentuated by seeing her in Manon performances in Montreal.

His passion for opera in general led him to visit the Royal Opera House in London and a lowly paid job with Decca Records in that city. Moving up the ranks in the 1950s, he landed in New York in 1959 and for the next 20 years made London Records, Decca's classical arm, the most significant label in the United States.

== San Francisco Opera ==
After being approached by San Francisco Opera Director Kurt Herbert Adler regarding a job, McEwen moved to the city in 1980 and immersed himself in learning the operations of an opera company. By January 1982 McEwen was running the Opera.

Given his expertise and background in understanding the wonders of the human voice, it is not surprising that his approach in his early years was away from the theatrical and more focused on the vocal. With his Ring Cycle, which began in the Summer 1983 and Fall 1984 seasons (and which was presented in its entirety in June 1985), McEwen demonstrated where his priorities lay: they were focused on hiring the best singers in the world.

As a reaction to the economic climate of the times, in 1982 McEwen created the "San Francisco Opera Center" to oversee and combine the operation and administration of the numerous affiliate educational and training programs. Providing a coordinated sequence of performance and study opportunities for young artists, the San Francisco Opera Center includes the "Merola Opera Program", "Adler Fellowship Program", "Showcase Series", "Brown Bag Opera", "Opera Center Singers", "Schwabacher Recitals", and various Education Programs. By introducing his young singers to the great voices of the past, inviting them to rehearsals, and giving tickets to current productions, McEwen hoped to create rounded performers who could appear in the regular Fall season.

Amongst his successes in this regard was the mezzo-soprano Dolora Zajick from Nevada. By "hand holding"" her through the various stages of training, he prepared her for the role of Azucena in the summer 1986 season to great acclaim.

On 8 February 1988, McEwen announced his resignation. The following day his mentor, Kurt Herbert Adler, died.

McEwen died in Honolulu, Hawaii at age 69.
