= Gaetano Merola =

Italian conductor and pianist

- Born: 4 January 1881; Naples, Italy
- Died: 30 August 1953 (aged 72); San Francisco, California, US
- Education: Naples conservatory
- Occupations: Conductor, pianist

Gaetano Merola (4 January 1881 – 30 August 1953) was an Italian conductor, pianist and founder of the San Francisco Opera.

== Biography ==
Merola was born in Naples, the son of a Neapolitan court violinist and studied piano and conducting at the Naples conservatory. He emigrated to the United States in 1899 and served as an assistant conductor at the Metropolitan Opera, Henry Wilson Savage's opera company in Boston, and Fortune Gallo's traveling San Carlo Opera Company. Oscar Hammerstein I hired Merola as choral conductor of his Manhattan Opera Company where Merola remained until the company folded in 1910. He then served as conductor in Hammerstein's London Opera House before returning to New York as an operetta conductor. Merola conducted the premieres of several shows, including Victor Herbert's Naughty Marietta, Rudolf Friml's The Firefly and Sigmund Romberg's Maytime.

=== San Francisco years ===
It was while touring with the San Carlo Opera that Merola began making annual visits to San Francisco. He first heard Luisa Tetrazzini, a recent arrival to America, at the city's Tivoli Opera House in 1906 and recommended her to Hammerstein. San Francisco had had a long history of opera houses dating back to the Gold Rush. Recognizing the city's potential as a major opera center, by 1921 Merola decided to stay in the Bay Area and launched his first Bay Area opera season in 1922 with a summer season of Carmen, Pagliacci and Faust at the Stanford University football stadium where over 30,000 attended. Though the Stanford season resulted in a deficit, he pressed on and founded the San Francisco Opera Association the following year, 1923, adapting the Civic Auditorium to his purposes. He recruited some 2,000 individuals and local businesses to become Founders of his opera company. By 1927, he presented the local premieres of Tristan und Isolde and the then-new Turandot, and in the following years, he introduced Falstaff, La Fanciulla del West and Die Meistersinger.

=== War Memorial Opera House ===
For years, the local citizenry had spoken of building a new opera house. The aftermath of World War I had also kindled a desire to honor the city's war heroes with a veteran's building or art museum. Eventually, those ideas coalesced into a joint project that was to consist of two Palladian-style edifices. One building would house an art museum with veterans rooms while the other would be home to Merola's San Francisco Opera. Two lots across from City Hall were appropriated for the construction, and a bond issue was approved by the voters in 1927. By October 1931, when the twin cornerstones were laid, the stock market crash and ensuing Depression had significantly reduced the construction costs, and the two buildings were completed within the year for US$5.5 million.

The War Memorial Opera House opened on 15 October 1932 with an inaugural production of Tosca starring Claudia Muzio and Dino Borgioli (a primitive recording of Act 1 has survived, and is included in the Romophone Muzio series), followed a few days later by a charming 27-year-old Lily Pons in Lucia di Lammermoor. With a new house, Merola's company grew rapidly in its first decade, producing its first Richard Wagner Ring Cycle in 1935 starring Kirsten Flagstad (in her first complete Ring anywhere) and Lauritz Melchior, and introducing conductors Fritz Reiner in 1936 and Erich Leinsdorf in 1938.

Part of Merola's southern strategy was to augment his company's home season with run-out performances at the Shrine Auditorium in Los Angeles. He had been a partner in the formation of Los Angeles Grand Opera, which had a successful run from 1924 to 1931. With the opening of the War Memorial in October 1932, Merola entered into a business agreement with the Los Angeles arts impresario L.E. Behymer to present stars of the San Francisco Opera in an abbreviated season of locally produced operas. So it was that L.A. audiences heard Muzio and Borgioli in La traviata and Il trovatore and Pons in Lucia and Rigoletto just days before their War Memorial debuts. Other notable productions included The Bartered Bride with Elisabeth Rethberg and an immense Le Coq d'Or in 1934. In 1937, Merola shed all pretense of a Los Angeles company and formally established a long-running series of annual visits by the San Francisco Opera Association to the Shrine Auditorium. That first season included Lauritz Melchior and Kirsten Flagstad in Tristan und Isolde conducted by Fritz Reiner, Melchior in Lohengrin, Pons and Ezio Pinza in Lakmé, Gina Cigna and Giovanni Martinelli in Aida and Maria Jeritza in Tosca. The result was an unbroken string of yearly Los Angeles performances through 1965.

=== Later years ===
In 1943, Merola brought Kurt Herbert Adler to San Francisco to serve initially as chorus master; in time, he would take on additional duties as conductor, choral director and chief deputy. Adler had been Toscanini's assistant at Salzburg in 1936 and had arrived in the United States in 1938. Merola also continued to attract important new singers - often before they'd performed in other major American opera houses. Notable singers he introduced after the Second World War included Tito Gobbi, Ferruccio Tagliavini, Elena Nikolaidi, Renata Tebaldi and Mario del Monaco. In addition, he spotted and utilized West Coast talents, including lyric soprano Dorothy Warenskjold, who he discovered while conducting a Standard Hour radio broadcast at the California State Fair in Sacramento.

As his health and energy declined over the next decade, Merola turned over more and more of his duties to Adler, though he remained at the helm of the company until his death in 1953 – a stewardship of 30 years.

He died on 30 August 1953 while conducting an excerpt from Puccini's Madama Butterfly during a concert at Sigmund Stern Grove, an outdoor amphitheatre in western San Francisco where free summer concerts have been given since 1938.

== Merola Opera Program ==
Upon succeeding Merola as general director, Kurt Herbert Adler established the San Francisco Opera's training program for gifted singers and directors during the 1954–55 season. In 1957, the program was officially named the Merola Opera Program in honor of the company's founder and longtime general director, Gaetano Merola. The Merola Opera Program provides intensive training, coaching and master classes for eleven weeks every summer with established professionals in the various operatic fields, and its many graduates have gone on to important careers in opera.
