= San Francisco Opera =

American opera company

- Formation: 1923; 103 years ago
- Founder: Gaetano Merola
- Type: Opera company
- Location: San Francisco, California, United States
- Website: www.sfopera.com

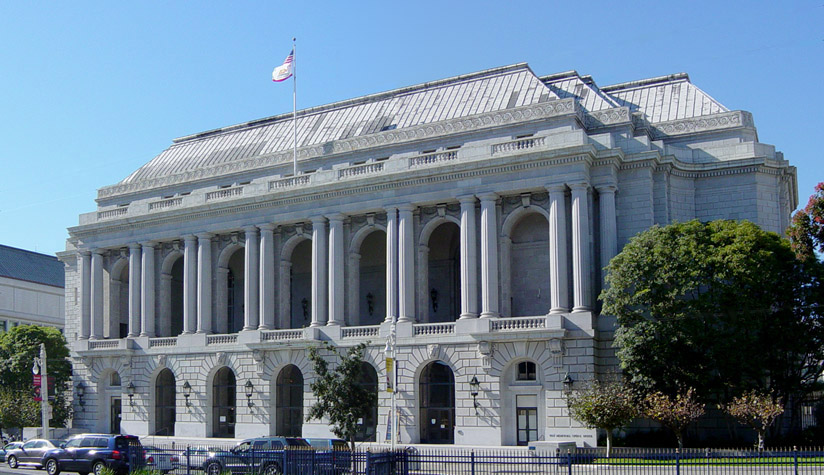
War Memorial Opera House at the San Francisco War Memorial and Performing Arts Center, home of the San Francisco Opera

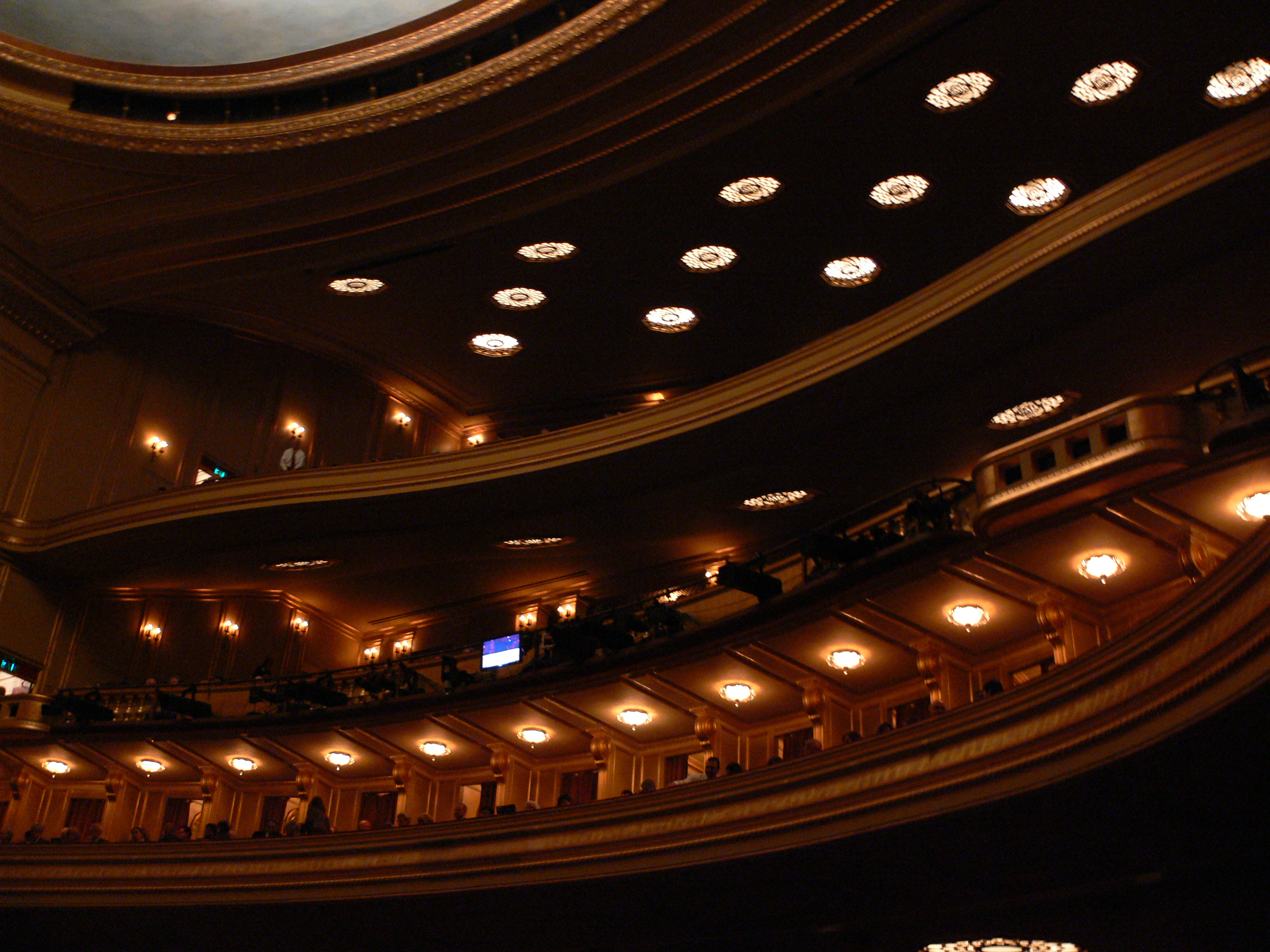
Auditorium of the War Memorial Opera House at the War Memorial and Performing Arts Center

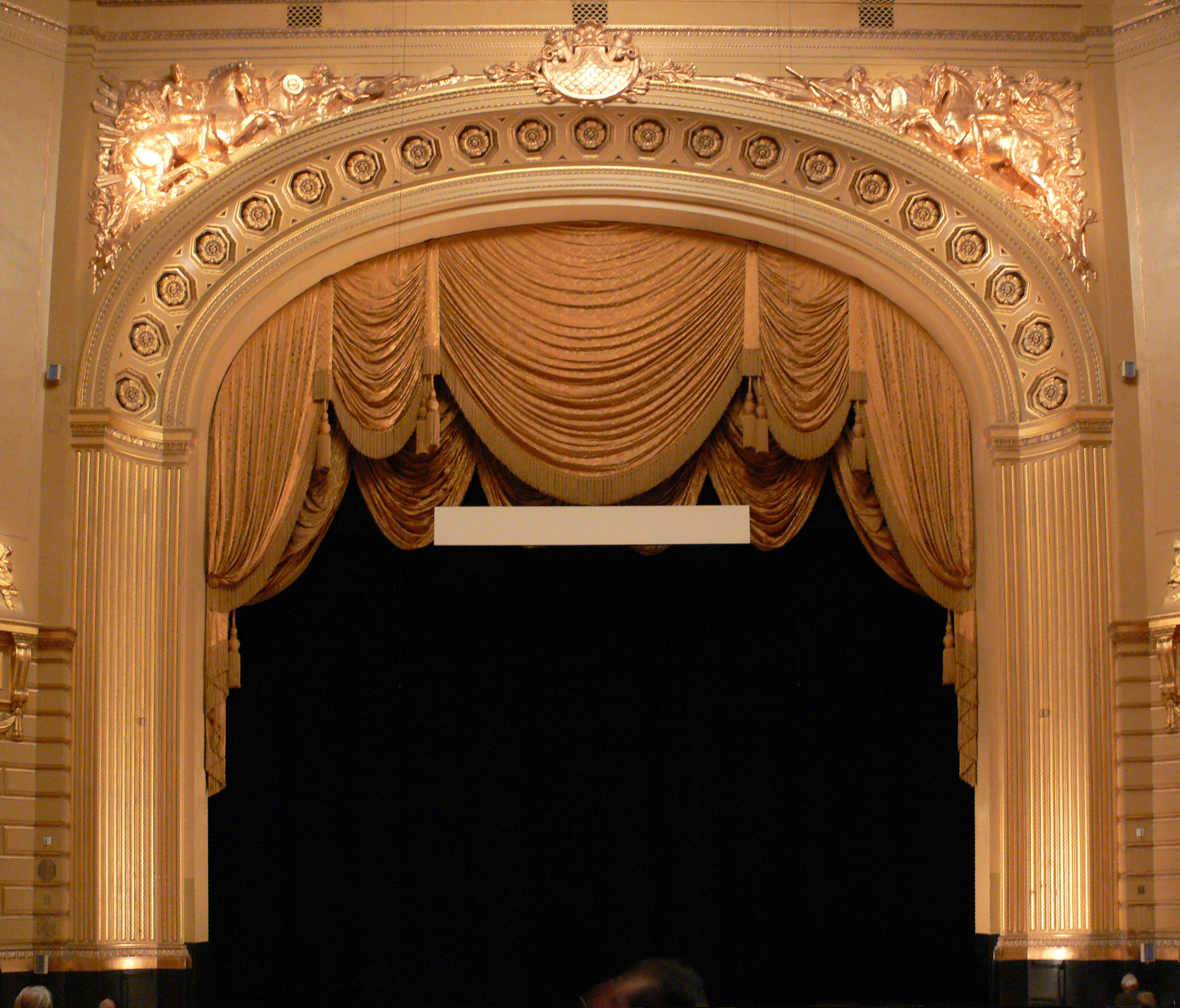
Stage, curtain, and proscenium corner ornamentation in the auditorium

The San Francisco Opera (SFO) is an American opera company founded in 1923 by Gaetano Merola (1881–1953) based in San Francisco, California.

== History ==
=== Gaetano Merola (1923–1953) ===
Merola's road to prominence in the Bay Area began in 1906 when he first visited the city. In 1909, he returned as the conductor of the International Opera Company of Montreal, one of the many visiting troupes that frequented the bustling city. Continued visits over the next decade convinced him that an opera company in San Francisco was viable.

Merola moved back to the city in 1921 with Mrs. Oliver Stine's support. He drafted plans for a new, locally owned opera company that would not rely on visiting troupes; a common practice for some opera companies since the Gold Rush. By the next year, Merola organized a trial season at Stanford University. The first performance occurred in the Stanford Cardinal's football stadium on June 3, 1922, with operatic tenor Giovanni Martinelli performing in Pagliacci, Carmen, and Faust.

The five-day season lacked any financial success; Merola instead successfully raised funds for a full season of opera in the following year. Following this, the first performance given by the San Francisco Opera was La bohème, with Queena Mario and Giovanni Martinelli, on September 26, 1923, in the city's Civic Auditorium.

In subsequent years, SFO would perform a wide array of Italian operas, rarely performing a given opera more than once per season. SFO seasons seldom lasted more than two months. The 1923–24 season included productions of Andrea Chénier and Mefistofele with Beniamino Gigli, Tosca with Giuseppe De Luca and Martinelli, and Verdi's Rigoletto with Queena Mario, De Luca, and Gigli.

Built in 18 months, from 1931–32, the San Francisco War Memorial Opera House was designed by Arthur Brown Jr.

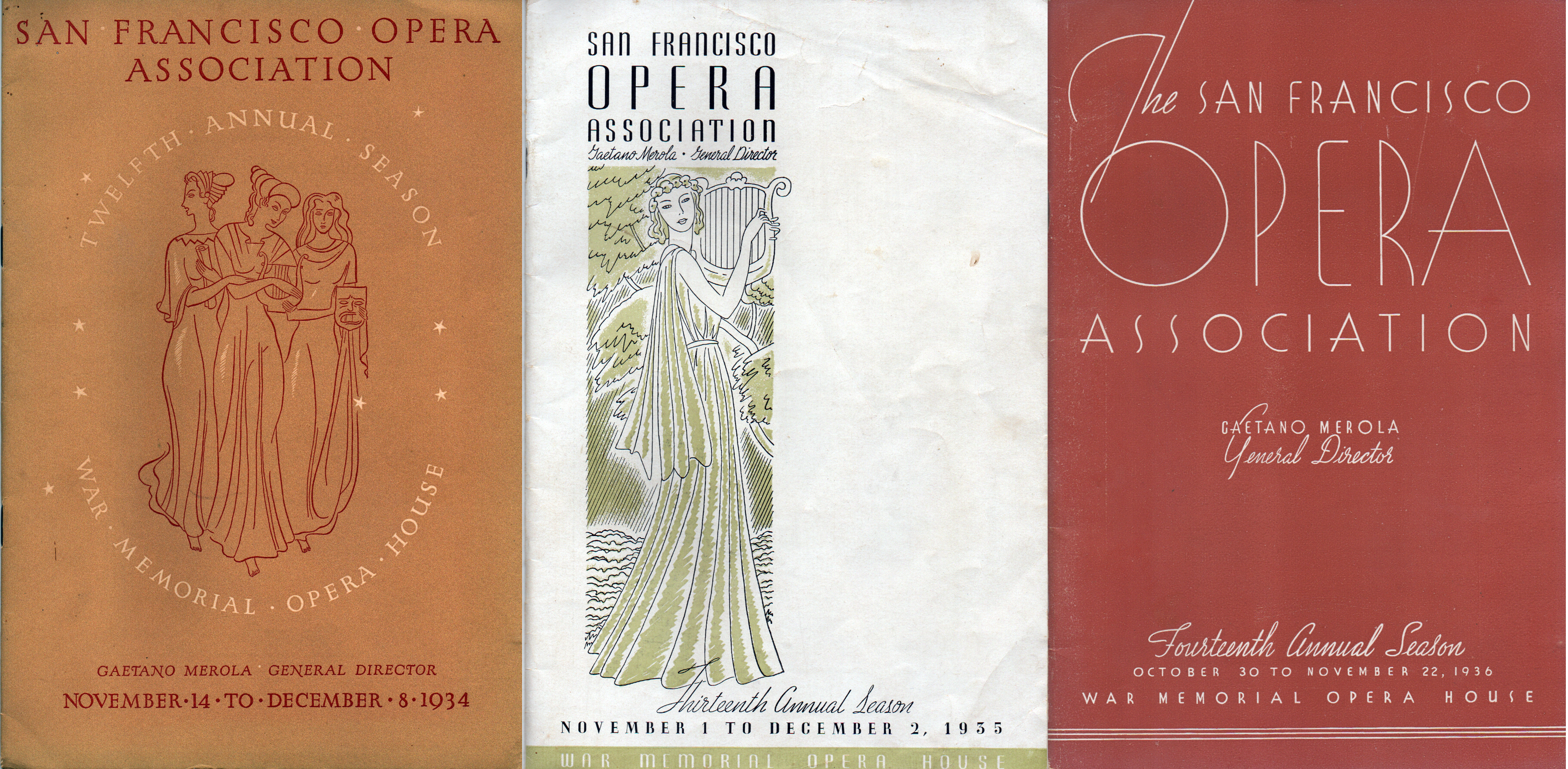
San Francisco Opera programs, 1934–36

On October 15, 1932, the company inaugurated the new opera house with a performance of Tosca on with Claudia Muzio in the titular role. Characteristic of Merola's years as general director was the fact (as noted by Chatfield-Taylor) that "the great singers of the world came regularly to San Francisco, often performing several roles in deference to the short season and long travel time across the country."

Edwin MacArthur led the San Francisco Opera Orchestra in several 78-rpm recordings for RCA Victor in the late 1930s, including performances by soprano Kirsten Flagstad. Some of these were later reissued by RCA on LP and CD.

Short versions of all the works in the season were broadcast on about 30 California, Oregon, Washington, Idaho and British Columbia radio stations, starting about 1941.

Merola's tenure lasted 30 years. Characteristics of Merola's SFO include creating opportunities for young American singers regardless of the fact that the opera lacked a formal training program at that time, and also regular tours by SFO to Los Angeles between 1937 and 1965, which expanded the season into November. However, not until well after Merola's death on August 30, 1953, while conducting an open-air concert at Stern Grove, did the main San Francisco season regularly extended beyond late October.

=== Kurt Herbert Adler (1953–1981) ===
Kurt Herbert Adler (1905–1988) came to the United States in 1938 after early experience and training in many aspects of music and theatre in Austria, Germany, and Italy. For five years, he worked to build the chorus of the Chicago Opera Company. Merola heard of him and, over the telephone, invited him to San Francisco in 1943 as chorus director.

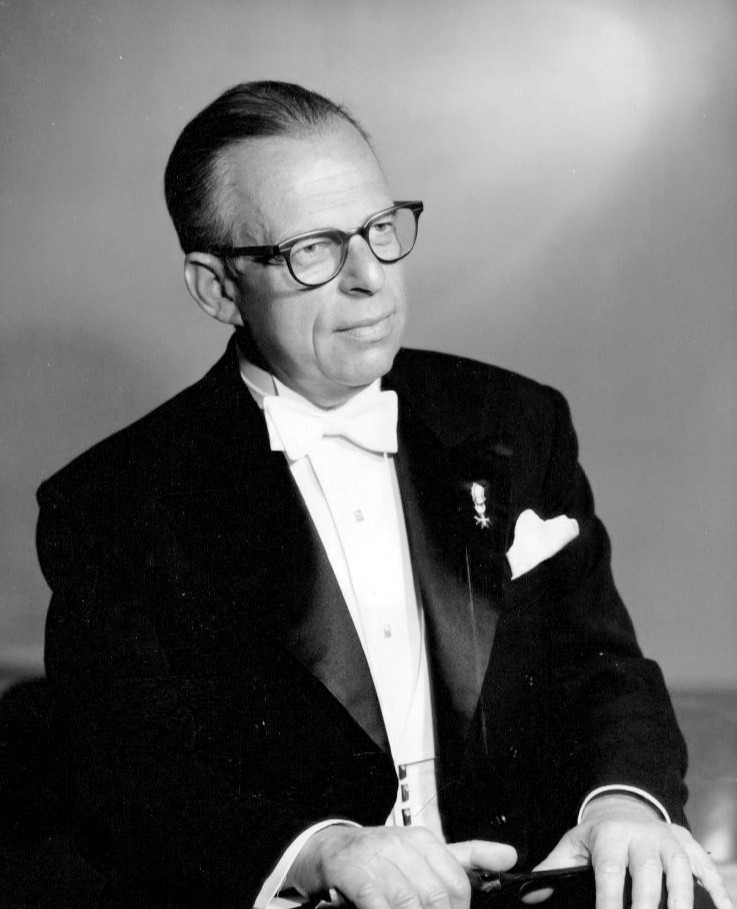
Kurt Herbert Adler (1966)

Adler was often regarded as a difficult, sometimes tyrannical person to work for. However, as Chatfield-Taylor notes, "singers, conductors, directors, and designers came back season after season. They came back because Adler made the SFO an internationally respected company that ran at a high level of professionalism and offered them interesting things to do in a warm and supportive atmosphere." Among those who were offered new and exciting challenges were Geraint Evans, the Welsh baritone, Leontyne Price, and Luciano Pavarotti.

He took on more and more administrative details as Merola's health and energy diminished, but Adler was not the board's natural choice to replace Merola at the time of his death in 1953. After many months as acting artistic and musical director, and with the assistance of its president, Robert Watt Miller, Adler was finally confirmed as general director in 1957.

==== Adler's aims ====
Adler had several aims in taking over the company. One was to expand the season; opening the Friday after Labor Day until early November. This was to capitalize on the availability of singers by presenting up to fourteen operas with two or three performances each. Eventually, as seen in the 1961 SFO season, eleven operas were given five or six performances each on average while the season ran to late November.

Another aim was to present new talent, and, for this, he was tireless in seeking out up-and-coming new singers, whether American or European, by attending performances in both major and minor opera houses. He heard Leontyne Price on the radio and offered her a role in Dialogues of the Carmelites in 1957, thus providing her with her first performance on a major operatic stage. A short time later in the same season, she was to step into the role of Aida at short notice to replace Antonietta Stella, a role which gave her long-lived international acclaim.

Adler developed a strong professional relationship with Birgit Nilsson. Nilsson made her US-debut in San Francisco in 1956. She returned almost every season for 26 years and made her last appearance in the house in 1982.

A characteristic of the Adler years was the interest in developing stronger connections to opera stage directors in an attempt to strengthen the dramatic and theatrical elements of the works. In this, he was greatly supported by his long relationship with Jean-Pierre Ponnelle, the often-controversial stage director and designer who began his association with SFO in 1957.

==== Merola Opera Program ====
Several innovations undertaken by Adler included the Merola Opera Program (named after the first general director). It began during the 1954/55 Season and was given its current name in 1957. The program now annually offers approximately 23 gifted singers, four apprentice coaches, and one apprentice stage director the rare opportunity of studying, coaching, and participating in master classes with established professionals for eleven weeks during the summer. Many went on to international careers, among them Carol Vaness and Thomas Hampson.

==== Opera in the Park ====
Another innovation was "Opera in the Park" which, since 1971, has been an annual free concert in Golden Gate Park on the Sunday following opening night of the Fall Season. It traditionally features artists from the opening weekend in full concert with the San Francisco Opera Orchestra. The event is open to the public and draws some 30,000 listeners. The concert is presented in conjunction with the non-profit San Francisco Parks Trust and the San Francisco Chronicle Charities.

==== Success of the company ====
By the 1970s, the company was highly successful and offered audiences the "cream of the crop" of internationally known singers, but with Adler often bringing in unknowns to make their American debuts or the surprise of well-known singers replacing ailing ones, there were some exciting nights at the opera. These included Plácido Domingo flying with no notice from New York City to San Francisco – albeit three hours after curtain time – to replace the ailing Carlo Cossutta on the opening night of Otello and the last-minute substitution by Leontyne Price for Margaret Price in the role of Aida.

From 1971 to 1979, San Francisco station KKHI broadcast the regular Friday night performances of the opera on AM and FM (in multiplex stereo with quadraphonic encoding). The broadcasts were hosted by several well-known announcers, including Scott Beach and Fred Cherry.

In the summer of 1972, the San Francisco Opera began its 50th anniversary celebrations with a special free concert in Sigmund Stern Grove. Adler conducted most of the program, which featured performances by many of the surviving singers who had appeared with the company during its history. The legendary tenor Lauritz Melchior conducted the orchestra, rather than sing, in a performance of the famous Radetsky March by Johann Strauss I; it was possibly his last public appearance. One of the highlights of the afternoon program was a moving performance of the love duet from Madama Butterfly with soprano Licia Albanese and tenor Frederick Jagel.

Adler retired on December 15, 1981.

=== Terence McEwen (1982–1988) ===
Following Adler's retirement announcement in June 1979, Terence A. McEwen (1929–1998) was Adler's hand-picked successor. Growing up in the Montreal area of Canada, McEwen learned to love opera at an early age, listened to the Met broadcasts, and at age 14, made a trip to New York one winter break to hear several of his favorite operas, which included Bidu Sayão and Jussi Björling in Rigoletto. As a singer, Sayão was forever to remain his passion, one which was accentuated by seeing her in Manon performances in Montreal.

His passion for opera in general led him to visit the Royal Opera House in London and a lowly paid job with Decca Records in that city. Moving up the ranks in the 1950s, he landed in New York in 1959 and for the next 20 years made London Records, Decca's classical arm, the most significant classical label in the United States.

After being approached by Adler regarding the San Francisco opera job, he moved to the city in 1980 and involved himself totally in learning the running of an opera company. In January 1982 McEwen was running the SFO.

Given his expertise and background in understanding opera and the wonders of the human voice, it is not surprising that his approach in his early years was away from the theatrical side and more focused on singers. With his Ring Cycle which began in the Summer 1983 and Fall 1984 seasons — and which was presented in its entirety in June 1985 – McEwen demonstrated where his priorities lay: they were focused on hiring the best singers in the world.

As a reaction to the economic climate of the times, in 1982 McEwen, created the "San Francisco Opera Center" to oversee and combine the operation and administration of the numerous affiliate educational and training programs. Providing a coordinated sequence of performance and study opportunities for young artists, the San Francisco Opera Center included the "Merola Opera Program", "Adler Fellowship Program", "Showcase Series", "Brown Bag Opera", "Opera Center Singers", "Schwabacher Recitals", and various Education Programs. By introducing his young singers to the great voices of the past, inviting them to rehearsals, and giving tickets to current productions McEwen hoped to create rounded performers who could appear in the regular Fall season.

Among his successes in this regard was the mezzo-soprano Dolora Zajick from Nevada. By "hand holding" her through the various stages of training, he prepared her for the role of Azucena in Il trovatore for the summer 1986 season to great acclaim.

During the 1983 fall season, the student/family matinee performances of La traviata were presented with supertitles. These are English translations of the libretto projected over the proscenium simultaneously with the action on stage. The overwhelmingly favorable response prompted the company to introduce the practice in increasing numbers of performances in subsequent seasons. Supertitles are now used for all San Francisco Opera productions and SFO also rents its supertitles internationally to other opera companies.

In 1986, Sir John Pritchard was appointed music director and served until 1989.

On 8 February 1988, McEwen announced his resignation. The following day his mentor, Kurt Herbert Adler, died.

=== Lotfi Mansouri (1988–2001) ===
Lotfi Mansouri (born 1929) was already a known quantity when Terry McEwen announced his retirement. Then head of the Canadian Opera Company in Toronto, Mansouri had received an education in medicine in Los Angeles, but gave it all up upon becoming fixated on opera, first as a young tenor with UCLA's Opera Workshop, and then with opera in general.

As early as 1962, with Mansouri having found work as director in Los Angeles followed by his becoming resident stage director at the Zürich Opera, Adler came to see him at work, and he was offered six operas to direct in the 1963 season. By the time he became general director, he had directed 60 operas for SFO and many others elsewhere.

By 1975 he was director of the Canadian Opera Company where, in 1983, he had introduced the revolutionary supertitles. Mansouri's feelings on the effects of titling was that the audience would be more engaged in the performance. This was a momentous change in the world of opera.

Mansouri introduced many new operas to the SFO repertory. These included more Russian operas with the highlight being Valery Gergiev's conducting of Prokofiev's War and Peace and a firm link established with the Kirov Opera. Also, there was Rossini's Guillaume Tell and Verdi's I vespri siciliani which followed.

One of Mansouri's triumphs was the overseeing of the reconstruction and renovation of the opera house following the October 1989 earthquake. After closing at the end of the 1995 Fall season for "a 21-month, US$88.5 million renovation, San Francisco's War Memorial Opera House reopened on 5 September 1997 with a gala concert celebrating this occasion, as well the 75th anniversary of the San Francisco Opera. Fittingly, the concert featured operatic greats of the past, present and future. The project included repairs of damage caused by the 1989 Loma Prieta earthquake, improvements for the audience and performers, seismic strengthening and a general cleanup that left the 65-year-old Opera House gleaming."

Donald Runnicles was named music director and principal conductor of SFO in 1990, and assumed the posts in 1992.

In November 1992, Mansouri introduced "Pacific Visions", an ambitious program designed to maintain the vitality of the opera repertoire through new commissions and the presentation of unusual repertoire. It was launched with the commissioning of the following operas:

- The Dangerous Liaisons, composed by Conrad Susa to a libretto by Philip Littell, had its world premiere during the 1994 fall season and was the subject of a nationwide TV broadcast. The cast featured Renée Fleming, Frederica von Stade, and Thomas Hampson.
- Harvey Milk, composer Stewart Wallace to a libretto by Michael Korie. It was performed in 1996 as a joint commission and co-production of the SFO, Houston Grand Opera, and New York City Opera. The cast featured Raymond Very as Dan White, Robert Orth as Harvey Milk and Gidon Sachs as Mayor Moscone.
- A Streetcar Named Desire, composed by André Previn to a libretto by Philip Littell, after the play by Tennessee Williams. The work had its premiere during the 1998–99 fall season. The cast included Renée Fleming as Blanche DuBois and Elizabeth Futral as Stella, baritone Rod Gilfry as Stanley Kowalski and tenor Anthony Dean Griffey as Mitch.
- Dead Man Walking, composed by Jake Heggie from a libretto by Terrence McNally after the book by Sister Helen Prejean, received its premiere in October 2000. The cast included Susan Graham as Sister Helen Prejean, John Packard as Joe; and Frederica von Stade as Mrs. Patrick de Rocher.
- The Death of Klinghoffer(a co-commission between San Francisco Opera, Brussels' La Monnaie, the Opera de Lyon, the Los Angeles Festival, the Glyndebourne Festival and the Brooklyn Academy of Music), composed by John Adams in 1992. The cast included Janice Felty in 3 roles, James Maddalena as The Captain, and Thomas Hammons as the First Officer.

Summing up his years at the SFO, the San Francisco Chronicle noted: "He's never been interested in the succès d'estime, the daring intellectual or theatrical coup that dazzles culture mavens but leaves the general public alienated or bewildered. For Mansouri, a success that doesn't put fannies in the seats is no success at all."

Towards the end of the 2001 season, Mansouri announced his retirement after fourteen seasons with SFO and 50 years in opera.

=== Pamela Rosenberg (2001–2005) ===
Pamela Rosenberg's first connection with the San Francisco Opera was as a standee while attending the University of California, Berkeley. She returned to SFO with a background of operatic productions in Germany and, specifically, as head of the Stuttgart Opera.

In January 2001, Rosenberg announced her first artistic initiative for San Francisco Opera, "Animating Opera", a multi-year plan of interwoven themes and series. These included "Seminal Works of Modern Times", "The Faust Project", "Composer Portrait: Janáček/Berlioz", "Women Outside of Society: Laws Unto Themselves", "Metamorphosis: From Fairy Tales to Nightmares", and "Outsiders or Pioneers?: The Nature of the Human Condition".

Incorporated within the production programming of "Animating Opera" was the America staged premiere of Messiaen's Saint-François d'Assise, Virgil Thomson's The Mother of Us All, as well as a commission for a new work by John Adams and Peter Sellars entitled Doctor Atomic, which premiered on 1 October 2005. Other operas new to the SFO's repertoire during her directorship include Busoni's Doktor Faust, Ligeti's Le Grand Macabre and Janáček's The Cunning Little Vixen.

After much controversy surrounding her management of the SFO, which included deficits created after the "dot-com" collapse in 2000 and the effects of September 11 on arts attendance, she announced in 2004 that she would not renew her contract with the company when it ended in late 2005.

As noted by Steven Winn in the San Francisco Chronicle in December 2005, "Productions were scuttled or postponed in the face of a $7.7 million deficit. Ambitious programming initiatives and plans for a second, smaller performance venue went by the wayside. Company-wide cuts pared 14 percent from the company's $67 million budget in 2003."

He continued: "Embattled by financial woes and trying labor negotiations, Rosenberg was routinely blamed for problems that were largely beyond her control. Her taste for new and unusual operas and a European-honed aesthetic that favored brash and even radical reinterpretations of the classics, the thinking went, drove away audiences and donors and ran up costs in the company's hour of greatest need."

Rosenberg returned to Germany to work with Sir Simon Rattle and the Berlin Philharmonic as its Intendantin. From 2004 to 2007, Keith Cerny served as the chief financial officer of the San Francisco Opera.

=== David Gockley (2006–2016) ===
After 33 years of directing the Houston Grand Opera, David Gockley became the SFO's General Director on 1 January 2006. As part of an announcement of the 2006/2007 season and the future of the company on 11 January, Gockley noted that "this season we debut a new visual identity and logo in keeping with a new artistic philosophy. I believe that it speaks of glamour, sophistication, tradition and innovation all things that infuse our plans for the future of San Francisco Opera."

In May 2011, it was announced that Gockley's contract was to be extended through SFO's 2015–16 season. In October 2014 it was announced that Gockley would be stepping down from his post at the end of the 2015/16 season. His replacement was announced to be Matthew Shilvock in September 2015.

Ring Cycle

San Francisco Opera and Washington National Opera began a co-production of a new Ring Cycle in 2006 directed by Francesca Zambello. The production used imagery from various eras of American history and had a feminist and environmentalist viewpoint. SFO presented Das Rheingold in June 2008, Die Walküre in June 2010, and three complete Ring cycles in June 2011. The complete cycles in June 2011 were conducted by Donald Runnicles and featured cycle role debuts of Mark Delavan (Wotan) and Nina Stemme (Brünnhilde) as well as Jay Hunter Morris (making his role debut in the title role of Siegfried) and Ian Storey (making his role debut as Siegfried in Götterdämmerung.

Technological innovations

In May 2006 Gockley oversaw SFO's first simulcast, a live broadcast of a mainstage performance of Madama Butterfly to San Francisco's Civic Center Plaza for a crowd of 8,000. Subsequent simulcasts have been presented at Stanford University's Frost Amphitheater, four theaters in Northern California, and San Francisco's AT&T Park. SFO's has simulcast nine operas to AT&T Park since 2007 that have collectively drawn more than 165,000 opera fans.

The technology for the simulcasts and other innovations like OperaVision—a series of screens located throughout the War Memorial Opera House that project close-up shots of the action on stage—is made possible through SFO's Koret-Taube Media Suite. Completed in 2007, The Koret-Taube Media Suite is the first permanent high-definition broadcast-standard video production facility installed in any American opera house according to the company's website.

In 2007, San Francisco Opera returned to regular broadcasts of its productions on national and international radio., and in December the Opera announced the presentation of four operas in movie theaters across the United States. Following the initial presentation of the four operas in movie theaters in 2008, San Francisco Opera used these four titles to create its Grand Opera Cinema Series, making these titles available to be presented by performing arts centers, theaters, and universities. Since 2008 the company has added eight additional operas to the Grand Opera Cinema Series, and they have been presented by KQED-TV with hosts Rita Moreno and Joan Chen.

==== Music directors and conductors under Gockley ====
In September 2006, it was announced and reported that by mutual agreement with Gockley, Donald Runnicles would conclude his tenure as music director in 2009. However, he has maintained an association with SFO and conducted the 2010/11 production of Der Ring des Nibelungen as well as 2015's Les Troyens.

On 9 January 2007, SFO announced its third music director would be the Italian conductor Nicola Luisotti, beginning with the 2009/10 season, for an initial contract of 5 years. Luisotti made his SFO debut in 2005 with La forza del destino, and returned in 2008 to conduct La bohème prior to assuming the role of music director. In SFO's September 2009 program magazine, David Gockley announced that bringing on Luisotti as the company's music director was a large part of his goal to "reinvigorate the core Italian repertory that is San Francisco Opera's birthright." Gockley also stated that Luisotti would conduct three to four productions each season, including one non-Italian opera; since 2009 these non-Italian operas have included Salome, Lohengrin, and Carmen. Luisotti left the Opera in 2018.

In January 2009, Gockley announced the reappointment of Patrick Summers as principal guest conductor and named Giuseppe Finzi as the company's new assistant music director. Finzi was named as SFO's resident conductor in 2011.

==== Programming ====
The company secured composer John Adams' Nixon in China for their 2011/12 season.

San Francisco Opera has presented several world premieres under David Gockley's tenure. So far these include Philip Glass and Christopher Hampton's Appomattox in 2007; Stewart Wallace and Amy Tan's The Bonesetter's Daughter in 2008; and Christopher Theofanidis and Donna Di Novelli's Heart of a Soldier in 2011. In 2013, the company presented three world premieres: Nolan Gasser and Carey Harrison's The Secret Garden, based on the children's book by Frances Hodgson Burnett (and staged in conjunction with UC Berkeley's Cal Performances); Mark Adamo's The Gospel of Mary Magdalene; and Tobias Picker and J. D. McClatchy's Dolores Claiborne, based on the novel by Stephen King. In the summer of 2015 the world premiere of La Ciociara by Marco Tutino and Luca Rossi, based on novel of the same name by Alberto Moravia, took place.

San Francisco Opera's recent commissions include Dream of the Red Chamber by Bright Sheng and David Henry Hwang in the fall of 2016, based on the work of the same name by 18th-century Qing Dynasty writer Cao Xueqin.

==== Wilsey Center for Opera ====
In order to consolidate its various office and work spaces scattered throughout San Francisco, SFO took over the fourth floor of the War Memorial and Performing Arts Center in February 2016, following the completion of the building's $156-million seismic retrofit and renovation. To accomplish this, the company started a campaign to name various locations of the new space after donors in 2011. San Francisco philanthropist Dede Wilsey pledged a $5-million gift, and the entire facility was named the Diane B. Wilsey Center for Opera. Designed by San Francisco architectural firm Mark Cavagnero Associates, the center provides additional office space as well as costume storage; two multipurpose rooms for rehearsals, board meetings, and social events; and a 299-seat performance venue.

=== Matthew Shilvock (2016–present) ===
Matthew Shilvcock assumed the position of general director on August 1st, 2016, following the departure of previous director David Gockley. Following the departure of Nicola Luisotti in 2018, Eun Sun Kim was announced as the new musical director of the Opera, beginning in 2021, and she is the first female in the history of the San Francisco Opera to hold this position.
