= Sheri Greenawald =

American soprano (born 1942)

Sheri Greenawald (born November 12, 1947) is an American soprano and music educator who had a performance career in concerts and operas during the second half of the 20th century and early 21st century. She has portrayed principal roles in the world premieres of several operas, including works by composers Leonard Bernstein, Daniel Catán, Carlisle Floyd, Thomas Pasatieri, and Stephen Paulus. She has performed leading roles with opera companies in the US and abroad, including the Metropolitan Opera, Lyric Opera of Chicago, Houston Grand Opera, Bavarian State Opera, La Fenice, and Paris Opera. She was particularly active as a performer with the Santa Fe Opera and San Francisco Opera. A former member of the voice faculty at the Boston Conservatory, she served as director of the San Francisco Opera Center from 2002 through 2020.

Music critic Michael Walsh wrote that, "Only partly in jest, Greenawald has been described as a "heroic soubrette". Her lyric soprano voice is aptly suited to such Mozartian roles as Susanna, Zerlina, and Despina, Norina (Don Pasquale) and Sophie (Werther), but it also has considerable power and range, suitable for the heavier parts of Ellen Orford, Mimì and Violetta."

== Early life and education ==
Born Sheri Kay Greenawald in Iowa City, Iowa, on November 12, 1947, Greenawald grew up in Monticello, Iowa. In 1965 she entered the University of Northern Iowa (then known as State College of Iowa) where she was a voice student of Charles Matheson and earned a bachelor's degree in music. While at UNI a visiting music teacher from New York, Virginia Hutchins, convinced Greenawald to come to New York to sing for Maria DeVarady with whom she began voice lessons. She worked briefly in advertising in New York City, before entering the Professional Studies program at the Juilliard School where she was a pupil of voice teachers Hans Heinz and Daniel Ferro. She later studied with Audrey Langford in London.

== Performance career ==
Greenawald made her professional opera début in 1974 as Theresa in the New York première of Francis Poulenc’s Les mamelles de Tirésias which was staged by the Manhattan Theatre Club (MTC). She performed with the MTC again later that year as Célie in the New York premiere of Thomas Pasatieri's Signor Deluso. Two years later she created the role of Marian Harrington in the world premiere of Pasatieri's Washington Square (1976) at the Michigan Opera Theatre; later taking on the lead role of Catherine in that opera for its staging by the New York Lyric Opera Company in 1977.

Greenawald performed the title role in the original production of Carlisle Floyd's Bilby's Doll at the Houston Grand Opera in 1976; a production which was double cast with Catherine Malfitano (who performed the role in the premiere) as the other singer alternating in the part during the opera's initial run. She made her debut at the Santa Fe Opera (SFO) in 1976 as Susanna in Wolfgang Amadeus Mozart's The Marriage of Figaro. She returned to the SFO multiple times during her career, performing the roles of Nannetta in Verdi's Falstaff (1977), Countess Almaviva in The Marriage of Figaro (1982), Pamina in The Magic Flute (1984), the Governess in Benjamin Britten's The Turn of the Screw (1983), Eurydice in Jacques Offenbach's Orpheus in the Underworld (1983), Violetta in La traviata (1989), The Countess in Richard Strauss's Capriccio (1993), Christine Storch in Richard Strauss's Intermezzo (1994), and the title role in Emmerich Kálmán's Countess Maritza (1999).

Greenawald performed several roles with Opera Theatre of Saint Louis, including Mimì in Giacomo Puccini's La bohème with Vinson Cole as her Rodolfo in 1978, and Violetta in Verdi's La traviata in 1979. In 1978 she made her debut at the San Francisco Opera as Marzelline in Beethoven's Fidelio. She appeared with that company several more times, portraying the roles of Lauretta in Puccini's Gianni Schicchi (1979), Mozart's Pamina (1980), the title role in Jules Massenet's Cendrillon (1982), Bella in the United States premiere of Michael Tippett's The Midsummer Marriage (1983), Cordelia in Aribert Reimann's Lear (1985), and the title role in Massenet's Manon (1986).

Greenawald made her international debut at the Dutch National Opera as Susanna in Wolfgang Amadeus Mozart's The Marriage of Figaro in 1980. In 1981 she performed the role of Gilda in Giuseppe Verdi's Rigoletto at the Opera Theatre of Saint Louis. That same year she performed Puccini's Mimi with the Washington National Opera under conductor Gian Carlo Menotti with President Ronald Reagan and First Lady Nancy Regan attending the opening night performance. Later that season she performed again with the Washington National Opera] s Anna Truelove in Stravinsky's The Rake's Progress. In 1983 she created the role of Dede in the world premiere of Leonard Bernstein's A Quiet Place at the Houston Grand Opera, and portrayed Hanna Glawari in Franz Lehár's The Merry Widow for her debut with the Canadian Opera Company. In 1987 she performed the role of Violetta in Verdi's La traviata with Opera North in Leeds, England. She returned to the Canadian Opera Company in 1990 as Magda in Puccini's La rondine.

At the Seattle Opera Greenawald appeared as Natasha in Prokofiev's War and Peace (1990) and Melisande in Claude Debussy's Pelléas et Mélisande (1993). In 1991 she made her debut at the Lyric Opera of Chicago as Pauline in Prokofiev's The Gambler. In 1992 she performed the role of Donna Anna in Mozart's Don Giovanni with the Chicago Symphony Orchestra and conductor Daniel Barenboim. She performed the role of Birdie in Marc Blitzstein's Regina with the Scottish Opera, and appears on that company's 1993 recording of the opera made for Decca Records. In 1994 she returned to the Houston Grand Opera as Anna Maurrant in Kurt Weill's Street Scene. She appeared at the Welsh National Opera as Marschallin in Der Rosenkavalier (1994) and Countess Almaviva in The Marriage of Figaro (1995), the latter with conductor Carlo Rizzi.

In 1995 Greenawald returned to the Opera Theatre of Saint Louis to create the role of Helen in the world premiere of Stephen Paulus's The Woman at Otowi Crossing. That same year she portrayed Marie Antoinette in John Corigliano's The Ghosts of Versailles at the Lyric Opera of Chicago, and made her debut at the Metropolitan Opera as Jenny in Weill's Rise and Fall of the City of Mahagonny. In 1996 she created the title role in the world premiere of Daniel Catán's Florencia en el Amazonas in Houston; a work she also performed with the Los Angeles Opera and Seattle Opera. That same year she portrayed Abigail in Jack Beeson's Lizzie Borden at the Glimmerglass Opera. In 1999 she returned to the Houston Grand Opera as Countess Charlotte Malcolm in Stephen Sondheim's A Little Night Music.

In 2000 Greenawald sang in Kurt Weill's Seven Deadly Sins with the Los Angeles Philharmonic. In 2002 she portrayed the Beggar Woman in the Lyric Opera of Chicago's production of Stephen Sondheim's Sweeney Todd with Bryn Terfel in the title role. In 2018 she portrayed the Old Lady in Leonard Bernstein's Candide with the San Francisco Symphony.

== Teaching career ==
Greenawald was a member of the voice faculty at the Boston Conservatory from 2000 to 2002. She served as director of the San Francisco Opera Center from 2002 through 2020.
