= The Trial of Mary Lincoln =

Opera by Thomas Pasatieri

- Opera by Thomas Pasatieri
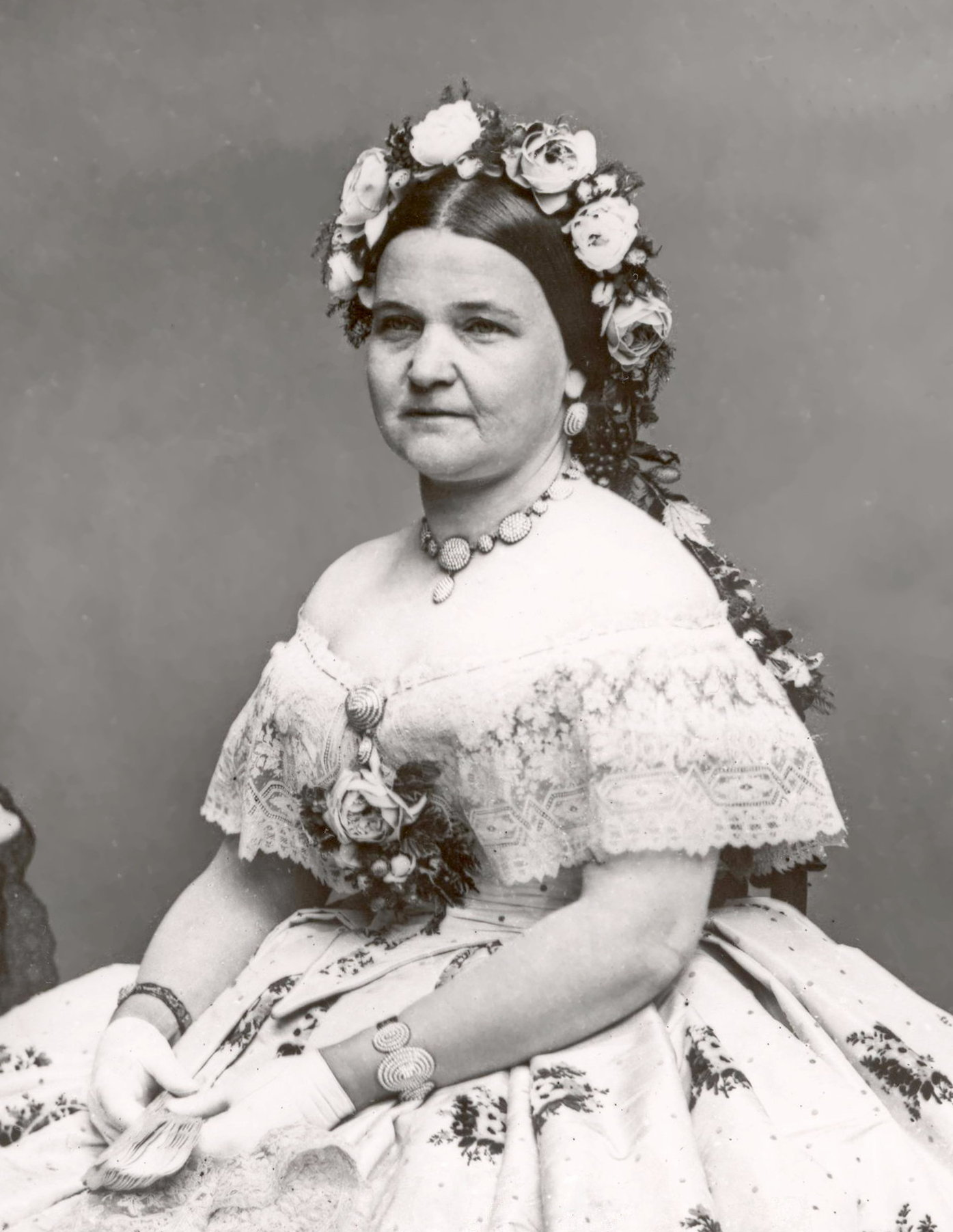
- Mary Todd Lincoln, the subject of the opera
- Librettist: Anne Howard Bailey

The Trial of Mary Lincoln is an opera in one act by composer Thomas Pasatieri. Commissioned for television by the National Educational Television network under the leadership of Peter Herman Adler, the work uses an English language libretto by Anne Howard Bailey. Bailey was awarded the Primetime Emmy Award for Outstanding Writing for a Variety Series for her libretto.

A work of historical fiction, the opera is based on the life of Mary Todd Lincoln; mainly focusing on the 1875 trial where her sanity was being evaluated. Set in an around Washington, Illinois, the opera consists largely of flashbacks to her early life, and ends with the judgment of her insanity and her committal.

The Trial of Mary Lincoln premiered on a nationally televised broadcast on February 14, 1972 with Elaine Bonazzi as the title heroine. Kirk Browning directed the production which also starred Wayne Turnage as Robert Todd Lincoln, Carol Bogarde as Elizabeth Todd, Julian Patrick as Lincoln's Clerk, Alan Titus as Mary's nephew, and Chester Watson as Leonard Swett.

== See also ==
- Pasatieri's operas Black Widow (1972), The Seagull (1974), Signor Deluso (1974), Frau Margot (2007)
