= The Imaginary Cuckold =

1660 play by Molière

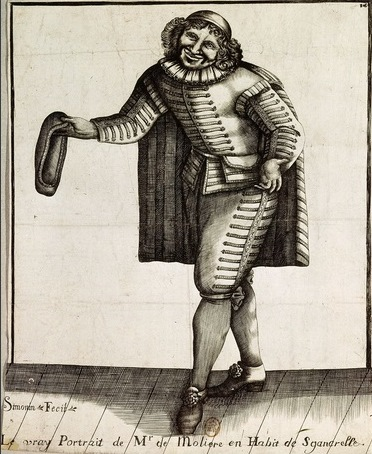
- Molière as Sganarelle
- Original language: French
- Written by: Molière
- Genre: Comedy
- Setting: 17th-century Paris

Premiere
- Date: 28 May 1660
- Place: Théâtre du Petit-Bourbon, Paris

Sganarelle, or The Imaginary Cuckold (French: Sganarelle, ou Le Cocu imaginaire) is a one-act comedy in verse by Molière. It was first performed on 28 May 1660 at the Théâtre du Petit-Bourbon in Paris to great success. Molière himself played the role of Sganarelle at the premiere and continued to perform it throughout his career. The story deals with the consequences of jealously and hasty assumptions in a farcical series of quarrels and misunderstandings involving Sganarelle (the imagined cuckold of the title), his wife, and the young lovers, Célie and Lélie.

== History ==
Although there are no direct literary sources for the play, The Imaginary Cuckold was influenced by both the French farce and the Italian commedia dell'arte traditions with the story unfolding over 24 scenes written in alexandrine verse. Molière wrote the character of Sganarelle as a vehicle for himself and played him in the premiere. The Sganarelle character first appeared in his 1645 play Le Médecin volant and would later re-appear in multiple Molière plays, each time with a different aspect of the character's personality developed or emphasised.

The play was an instant success at its premiere, playing throughout 1660 with several further private performances for Cardinal Mazarin and King Louis XIV. It was to become the most frequently performed of Molière's plays during his lifetime and was offered every year by his company. Molière refused to have the play published to protect his company's exclusive performing rights. However, one enthusiastic spectator, "La Neufvillenaine" (pseudonym of the Parisian publisher Jean Ribou), saw the play so many times during its first run that he was able to write it down from memory. The text (with his added commentary) was published in a "pirate" edition by Ribou in late 1660.

Although Molière intended the play to be performed in one act without interruptions (as documented by La Grange in 1682), some 18th-century editors divided the play into three acts with the breaks coming after Scenes 6 and 17. The Imaginary Cuckold continues to be performed today in its original one-act version both in France and in other countries (often in translation). A performance of the play by the actors of the Comédie-Française with stage direction by Thierry Hancisse was broadcast on France 3 television in 2002 and released on DVD in 2008.

== Characters and premiere cast ==
Character	Premiere cast 28 May 1660
Sganarelle, a middle-aged bourgeois Parisian	Molière
Sganarelle's wife	Mademoiselle de Brie
Célie, a romantic young woman betrothed to the absent Valère but in love with Lélie	Mademoiselle Du Parc
Gorgibus, a bourgeois Parisian, Sganarelle's neighbour and Célie's father	L'Espy (François Bedeau)
Lélie, a well-bred and idealistic young man in love with Célie	La Grange
Gros-René, Lélie's gluttonous valet	Du Parc
Célie's governess	Madeleine Béjart
Villebrequin, Valère's father	De Brie (Edme Villequin)
A relative of Sganarelle

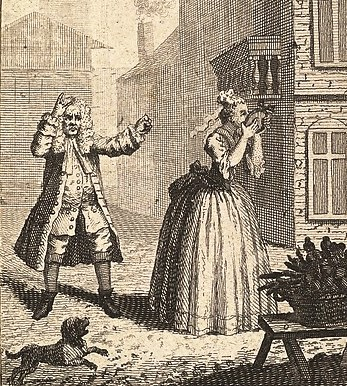
Hogarth's depiction of Scene 6 in which Sganarelle discovers his wife admiring Lélie's portrait

== Synopsis ==
The greedy and domineering Gorgibus is forcing his daughter Célie to marry the wealthy Valère, but she is in love with Lélie and he with her. Célie, in distress at her impending marriage to Valère, faints in the street, and Sganarelle, who is passing by, attempts to revive her. In the process she loses her miniature portrait of Lélie which ends up in the hands of Sganarelle and his wife. These two events set off a series of mistaken assumptions and quarrelling: Sganarelle's wife believes that he and Célie are lovers; Sganarelle believes that Lélie and his wife are lovers; Célie believes that Lélie and Sganarelle's wife are lovers; and Lélie believes that Célie has secretly married Sganarelle. Célie's governess helps sort out the confusion in the penultimate scene, and in the final scene Villebrequin arrives with the surprise news that four months ago his son Valère had secretly married someone else. Célie and Lélie are now free to marry. In the final lines of the play Sganarelle addresses the audience:

You have seen how the strongest evidence can still plant a false belief in the mind. Remember well this example, and even when you see everything, never believe anything.

== Adaptations ==
- The Play House to be Let, by William Davenant (1669) includes a translation of the play into French-accented English.
- The Picture, or The Cuckold in Conceit, ballad opera in two acts; music by Thomas Arne, libretto by James Miller (1745)
- Sganarelle or Der Schein trügt ("Sganarelle, or Appearances are Deceptive"), chamber opera in one act; music and libretto by Rudolf Wagner-Regeny (1929)
- Sganarelle, comic opera in one act; music and libretto by Walter Kaufmann (1958)
- Sganarelle, comic chamber opera in one act; music and libretto by Violet Archer (1974)
- Signor Deluso, opera buffa in one act; music and libretto by Thomas Pasatieri (1974)
- "Sangeet Sanshaykallol" Marathi musical play by Govind Ballal Deval (1919) based on Sganarelle
