= Signor Deluso =

Opera by Thomas Pasatieri

- Opera by Thomas Pasatieri
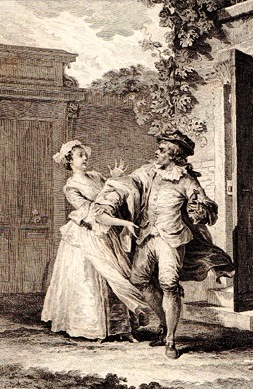
- Scene from Molière's comedy Sganarelle, ou Le Cocu imaginaire, the inspiration for the opera's libretto
- Librettist: Thomas Pasatieri
- Premiere: 27 July 1974; Madeira School, McLean, Virginia

Signor Deluso is an opera buffa in one act composed by Thomas Pasatieri. The English-language libretto, written by the composer, is loosely based on Molière's 1660 comedy Sganarelle, ou Le Cocu imaginaire ("Sganarelle, or The Imaginary Cuckold"). It premiered on 27 July 1974 at the Madeira School auditorium in McLean, Virginia performed by the Wolf Trap Opera Company. It has been subsequently performed many times by various small opera companies in the United States and Europe. In a review of a 2008 revival in Washington, D.C., Anne Midgette described it as "an exuberant sendup of over-the-top comic opera plots, filled with effusive lovers leaping with alacrity to wrong conclusions in floods of extreme vocalism."

== Background and performance history ==
A commission from the Juilliard School of Music, the opera was composed when Pasatieri was 28. He chose the subject after reading Molière's Sganarelle, ou Le Cocu imaginaire. He wrote the libretto himself and completed the score in two months. The opera had its world premiere on 27 July 1974 in a production by the Wolf Trap Opera Company directed by David Bartholomew and conducted by John Moriarty. It was performed as a double bill with Pasatieri's one-act opera Calvary which had premiered in 1971. The New York premiere of Signor Deluso followed later that year performed by the Manhattan Theatre Club. The Juilliard School staged it in 1979.

The opera is scored for seven solo singers and a small orchestra (flute, oboe, clarinet, horn, piano, violin, viola, and cello). Its short running time (30 minutes) and chamber opera format have made it particularly popular with small opera companies and music schools. By 2006, Signor Deluso had received over 8000 performances and had been performed in the United States, Finland, Germany, Sweden, and Korea. A recording of the work performed by Opera Company of Brooklyn was released by Albany Records in 2006.

== Roles ==
Role	Voice type	Premiere cast, 27 July 1974 Conductor: John Moriarty
Célie	soprano	Alise Veloze
Gorgibus, Célie's father	bass-baritone	Stanley Wexler
Rosine, Célie's maid	mezzo-soprano	Judith Christin
Léon, in love with Célie	tenor	Modest Crisci
Signor Deluso	baritone	Raeder Anderson
Clara, Deluso's wife	soprano	Linda Lane Smith
Town Magistrate	bass-baritone	J. Scott Brumit

== Synopsis ==
Gorgibus is forcing his daughter Célie to marry the wealthy Valère, but she is in love with Léon and he with her. However, A series of mistaken assumptions and quarrelling ensues after Célie faints in the town square and loses her locket with a portrait of Léon inside. Signor Deluso tries to revive her, leading his wife Clara to suspect they are lovers. When Signor Deluso finds Clara looking at the portrait in Célie's lost locket, he immediately assumes that the young man depicted is Clara's lover. In turn, Célie assumes that Léon has been unfaithful to her with Clara, and Léon assumes that Célie has been unfaithful to him with Signor Deluso. The maid Rosine arrives to sort everything out with the announcement that Valère has been secretly married to his maid for three months. Célie and Léon are now free to marry, and the various misunderstandings between the couples are cleared up. In the final lines of the opera, Signor Deluso addresses the audience:

Have you ever seen such confusion? It seems conclusive evidence can lead to very wrong conclusions. So go home now and remember: Don't believe everything you see!

== Musical numbers ==
1. "No! No! Never! I will never marry Valère" (Célie, Gorgibus, Rosine, Signor Deluso, Clara)

2. "Oh, they will charm you at first and pledge eternal love" (Clara, Signor Deluso)

3."There is her house. Dare I enter?" (Léon)

4. "I've got it back. Now let me look at the face of my rival" (Signor Deluso, Léon, Clara, Town Magistrate)

5. "Your stay was much too brief" (Clara, Léon, Célie, Signor Deluso)

6. "Yes, father, I agree" (Célie, Gorgibus, Rosine, Léon, Signor Deluso, Clara)

7. Finale: "Now let me clear up this mess" (Rosine, Léon, Signor Deluso, Clara, Célie)

== See also ==
- Pasatieri's operas Black Widow, The Seagull, and Frau Margot
