= Judith Christin =

American operatic mezzo-soprano

Judith Christin is an American operatic mezzo-soprano.

Born in Providence, Rhode Island, Christin received both her bachelor's and master's degrees from Indiana University. For nine years she was artist in residence at Metropolitan State University of Denver. She has sung over one hundred roles during her career. At the Metropolitan Opera she created the role of Susanna in The Ghosts of Versailles; she has sung a variety of other roles at the house in nearly 200 performances since making her debut as Filippyevna in Eugene Onegin in 1993. She has appeared at San Francisco Opera, Lyric Opera of Chicago, Houston Grand Opera, and Santa Fe Opera, among other companies. Among roles which she has performed are Mamma Lucia in Cavalleria rusticana; Marta in Mefistofele; the title role in Louise; the witch in Hansel and Gretel; Mrs. Lovett in Sweeney Todd; Marcellina in Le nozze di Figaro; Suzuki in Madama Butterfly; Mrs. Sedley in Peter Grimes; and the Countess in Andrea Chénier. At Santa Fe she created the role of Mrs. Gray in Modern Painters by David Lang in 1995; for Houston Grand Opera, in 2000, she was the first Effie Belle Tate in Cold Sassy Tree. Other operas in which she has created roles include Dr. Heidegger's Fountain of Youth, by Jack Beeson; The Duchess of Malfi, by Stephen Douglas Burton; Signor Deluso, by Thomas Pasatieri; Rosina, by Hiram Titus; and revisions of Washington Square by Pasatieri and A Death in the Family by William Mayer. American premieres in which she appeared include those of Anna Karenina by Iain Hamilton at Los Angeles Opera, in which she sang Dolly, and Chérubin by Jules Massenet at Carnegie Hall, in which she sang La Baronne. Christin was on the faculty of the Lamont School of Music at the University of Denver, but has since retired and continues to teach privately in Denver.
