= Elaine Bonazzi =

American operatic mezzo-soprano (1929–2019)

Elaine Bonazzi (August 28, 1929 – January 29, 2019) was an American operatic mezzo-soprano who had an active international career from the 1950s through the 1990s. A singer with an unusually broad repertoire that encompassed both classical and contemporary works, she notably created roles in the world premieres of operas by composers Dominick Argento, David Carlson, Carlisle Floyd, Gian Carlo Menotti, Thomas Pasatieri, and Ned Rorem. In the United States she was particularly active with the New York City Opera, the Santa Fe Opera, and the Washington National Opera.

== Life and career ==
Born in Endicott, New York in 1929, Bonazzi earned a Bachelor of Music in vocal performance from the Eastman School of Music in 1951. She then pursued graduate music studies at Hunter College and the Juilliard School, and studied privately with Elda Ercole in New York City. In 1955 she was the contralto soloist in Johann Sebastian Bach's Mass in B minor with the Oratorio Society of New York at Hunter College Auditorium. In 1956 she portrayed Lady Pamela in Daniel Auber's Fra Diavolo with the Hunter College Opera. That same year she portrayed Gertrude Stein in the lauded Off-Broadway production of Virgil Thomson's The Mother of Us All at the Phoenix Theatre.

In 1958 Bonazzi made her debut with the Santa Fe Opera (SFO) as Meg Page in Falstaff. That same year she portrayed Mrs. Linton in the world premiere of Carlisle Floyd's Wuthering Heights. She returned frequently to the SFO during her career, portraying such roles as Baba the Turk in The Rake's Progress, Countess Geschwitz in Lulu, Herodias in Salome, La chatte in L'enfant et les sortilèges, Marcellina in The Marriage of Figaro, Mark Smeaton in Gaetano Donizetti's Anna Bolena, The Mother in Mavra, the Old Woman in Yerma, Prince Orlofsky in Die Fledermaus, Saint Catherine in Jeanne d'Arc au bûcher, Tisbe in La Cenerentola, Zita in Gianni Schicchi, and the title roles in Carmen and Regina. Her final appearance at the SFO was as Mrs. Peachum in John Gay's The Beggar's Opera in 1992.

In 1960 Bonazzi made her debut with the Washington National Opera as the Countess in Pyotr Ilyich Tchaikovsky's The Queen of Spades. She returned to Washington D.C. later that year to perform the role of Death in Igor Stravinsky's The Nightingale conducted by the composer. Other roles she performed with the WNO during her career included Agata in Maria Golovin, The Old Baroness in Samuel Barber's Vanessa Sièbel in Faust, and Ursule in Béatrice et Bénédict. In 1986 she appeared at the WNO as Queen Isabella of Spain in Christopher Columbus, a pastiche of music by Jacques Offenbach patched together by Patric Schmid. Her final appearance with the company was as the Countess in The Queen of Spades in 1989.

In 1965 Bonazzi created the role of Christine in the world premiere of Ned Rorem's Miss Julie for her debut with the New York City Opera (NYCO). She sang several more roles with the NYCO, including Clairon in Capriccio, Frau von Luber in Der Silbersee, Katisha in The Mikado, Mme. Armfeldt in A Little Night Music, Mother in Louise, Mrs. Lovett in Sweeney Todd, and Suzuki in Madama Butterfly. In 1979 she created the role of Grace-Helen Broome in the world premiere of Dominick Argento's Miss Havisham's Fire with the NYCO. Her final appearance with the NYCO was as Marie in Frank Loesser's The Most Happy Fella in 1991 with director Arthur Allan Seidelman.

In 1962 Bonazzi made her debut at the Opera Company of Boston as Maddalena in Rigoletto, conducted by Sarah Caldwell. In 1963 she created the role of The Spy in Gian Carlo Menotti's Labyrinth which was commissioned for television by the NBC Opera Theatre. In 1964 she appeared as Suzuki in Madama Butterfly at the Dallas Opera. In 1966 she was one of the soloists in the world premiere of Stravinsky's Requiem Canticles at the McCarter Theatre in Princeton. In 1970 & 1972, she was a soloist with the Naumburg Orchestral Concerts, in the Naumburg Bandshell, Central Park, in the summer series.

In 1971 Bonazzi portrayed the Sorceress to Maureen Forrester's Dido in Dido and Aeneas at the Caramoor International Music Festival. She returned to Caramoor the following year to portray Arnalta in L'incoronazione di Poppea, conducted by Julius Rudel. In 1972 she created the title role in the world premiere of Thomas Pasatieri's Emmy Award-winning opera, The Trial of Mary Lincoln which was commissioned by the National Educational Television network under the leadership of Peter Herman Adler.

In 1973 Bonazzi portrayed Daniel in the Handel Society of New York's production of Belshazzar conducted by Stephen Simon at Carnegie Hall. That same year she gave her only performances with the Metropolitan Opera in New York, as the Sorceress in Dido and Aeneas conducted by Richard Dufallo. In 1976 she created the role of Lavinia Davenport in the world premiere of Thomas Pasatieri's Washington Square at the Michigan Opera Theatre.

Bonazzi appeared in numerous rarely seen operas with the Clarion Music Society at Alice Tully Hall during the 1970s and 1980s, including Anfione in Agostino Steffani's Niobe, regina di Tebe, Apollo in Francesco Cavalli's Giasone, Baroness Aspasia in Gioachino Rossini's La pietra del paragone, Juno in Gluck's Le nozze d'Ercole e d'Ebe, and Lavinia in Steffani's Amor vien dal destino.

In 1981 Bonazzi portrayed The Marquise of Birkenfeld in La fille du régiment with Tulsa Opera. In 1983 she portrayed Matryona Pavlovna/Korablyova in Franco Alfano's Risurrezione at the Cincinnati Opera. In 1985 she portrayed Baba the Turk at the Sarasota Opera. That same year she created the role of Madame d'Urfé in the world premiere of Argento's Casanova's Homecoming at the Minnesota Opera. In 1993 she created the role of Lady Neville in the world premiere of David Carlson's The Midnight Angel at the Opera Theatre of Saint Louis. She returned to Saint Louis the following year to perform the role of Mistress Quickly in Falstaff.

On the international stage Bonazzi performed leading roles at the Dutch National Opera, the National Theatre in Belgrade, and the Palacio de Bellas Artes in Mexico City. In 1964 she portrayed The Secretary in The Consul at the Vancouver Opera. In 1974 she portrayed Countess Geschwitz in Alban Berg's Lulu at the Festival dei Due Mondi.

Bonazzi taught for many years on the voice faculty at the Stony Brook University, retiring from there in 2012. Prior to teaching at SBU, she was a member of the vocal music faculty at the Peabody Institute of Music. Several of her students have had successful singing careers, including soprano Christine Goerke and mezzo-soprano Deanne Meek. She was married to cellist Jerome Carrington.

Bonazzi died in 2019 in Elizaville, New York, aged 89.
