= Opera Company of Brooklyn =

The Opera Company of Brooklyn (OCB) is an opera company founded in 2000 which performs in a variety of venues in New York City. It is a non-profit organization operating under Section 501(c)(3) of the Internal Revenue Code.

== History ==
Opera Company of Brooklyn is led by American conductor, Jay Meetze. Other artists who have worked with the company include Gerard Alessandrini, Thomas Pasatieri, Joseph Rescigno, and Adam Silverman.

The company also has an educational outreach program as well as a Resident Artist Program (RAP) for singers, coaches, pianists and conductors. Artists who have worked with students on the RAP include Lucine Amara, Harolyn Blackwell, Catherine Malfitano, Ashley Putnam and Thomas Pasatieri.

OCB was featured on the Jeopardy! quiz show, Good Morning America with MythBusters and CNN. Other coverage include numerous reports on radio: National Public Radio's Day to Day, American Public Media's Marketplace, 1010 WINS, WNYC's Overnight Music and Soundcheck, and reviews and articles (some front-page and full-page) in the Wall Street Journal, The New York Times, New York Post and New York Daily News, New York, American Record Guide, Opera News, Classical Singer, and Crain's New York Business.

The company has also performed new works like Thomas Pasatieri’s La Divina, an opera about the last days of a famous diva supposedly based on Maria Callas. Meetze recorded the opera where internationally renown soprano Sheri Greenawald, now the head of San Francisco Opera, Merola Young Artist program, performed.

The company's CD on Albany Records and featuring music by American composer, Thomas Pasatieri was named one of the "Best of the year" by Metropolitan Opera's Opera News magazine.

== Artistic trustees ==
Martina Arroyo, Steuart Bedford, Harolyn Blackwell, Simon Estes, Carlisle Floyd, Denyce Graves-Montgomery, William Hicks, Rhoda Levine, Elaine Malbin, Jane Marsh, Ashley Putnam, Barry Tucker, Frederica von Stade, David Walker.

== Collaborations/venues ==
Art/NY's Fort Greene Auditorium, Alvin Ailey American Dance Theater- The Joan Weill Center for Dance, Bargemusic, Barnard College, Brooklyn Bar Association: Annual Dinner at Marriott, Brooklyn Chamber of Commerce Christmas Party, Brooklyn Heights First Unitarian Church, Brooklyn Museum of Art: Eternal Egypt Exhibition, Brooklyn Public Libraries: Main Branch and Brooklyn Heights, CAMI Hall, First Street Gallery, Columbia University, Freeport Memorial Library - Long Island, Consulate General of the Federal Republic of Germany, Good Shepherd Catholic Church, ICO Art & Music Gallery, Katonah United Methodist Church, Liederkranz Club, Marymount Manhattan College: Adult Continuing Education course in opera, Metropolitan Community United Methodist Church, Northside Piers, NYC College of Technology's Voorhees Theatre and Klitgord Auditorium, New York City Public Schools, Phillipa Schuyler Middle School, Plymouth Church, Pratt Institute: Student Welcome Week, Science Skills Center High School, St. Ann's Episcopal Church, Saint James Church, St. Teresa's Church, Studios 353, The Young Women's Leadership School

== Reviews ==
- American Record Guide, November/December 2003
- Opera News, November 2003
- The Wall Street Journal, Friday, 7 November 2003, p. A1
- The New York Post, Tuesday, August 12, 2003, p. 36
- City Tech News & Events, October 1, 2003
- Opera Jamboree December 1, 2000,
