= Herbert Beattie =

American opera singer (1926–2019)

Herbert Wilson Beattie (August 23, 1926; Chicago, Illinois - August 25, 2019; Colorado Springs, Colorado) was an American operatic bass and voice teacher.

== Early life and education ==
Born in Chicago, Beattie studied vocal performance at Colorado College (B.A., 1948), Westminster Choir College (M.M., 1950), and the Mozarteum University of Salzburg (1955). He also studied voice at the American Conservatory of Music in Chicago with John Wilcox and privately with Dick Marzolo in New York and Josef Krips in Buffalo.

== Performance career ==
In 1957 Beattie made his debut at the New York City Opera (NYCO) as Baron Douphol in Verdi's La Traviata with Beverly Sills as Violetta. He appeared frequently with the NYCO for the next 25 years, portraying such roles as Marquis de Cascada in The Merry Widow (1957), Zuniga in Carmen (1957), Osmin in Die Entführung aus dem Serail (1957, 1966, 1969), Pooh-Bah in The Mikado (1958, 1961), Frank in Die Fledermaus (1959), the Sergeant of Police in The Pirates of Penzance (1960, 1964), Bartolo in The Marriage of Figaro (1962), Shadbolt in The Yeomen of the Guard (1964), Lindorf, Coppelius and Dr. Miracle in The Tales of Hoffmann (1965), Leandro in The Love for Three Oranges (1966), Secret Police Agent in The Consul (1966), the title role in Don Pasquale (1967), Raimondo Bidebent in Lucia di Lammermoor (1969), Falstaff in The Merry Wives of Windsor (1980), and the Priest in The Cunning Little Vixen (1981) among other appearances. He also appeared in several United States premieres with the NYCO, including portraying Sir Morosus in the American premiere of Richard Strauss's Die schweigsame Frau (1958) and the Mayor in the American premiere of Werner Egk's Der Revisor. In 1965 he created the role of Andrew Borden in the world premiere of Jack Beeson's Lizzie Borden at the NYCO.

In 1962 Beattie made his debut at the San Francisco Opera (SFO) as Osmin. He appeared in several more operas at the SFO through 1968, including Doctor Bartolo in The Barber of Seville, the Doctor in Wozzeck, Don Alfonso in Così fan tutte, Don Iñigo Gomez in L'heure espagnole, Lord Plimpton in Fra Diavolo, Mustafa in L'Italiana in Algeri, and the title role in Don Pasquale among others. In 1966 he portrayed the Prosecutor in the United States premiere of Darius Milhaud's Christophe Colomb at the SFO.

In 1964 Beattie portrayed Rutledge Blunt in the world premiere of Robert Ward's Lady From Colorado at the Central City Opera. He returned there in 1964 to portray William Jennings Bryan in the Central City Opera revival of Douglas Moore's The Ballad of Baby Doe. He made his debut at the Opera Company of Boston as Dr. Bartolo in The Marriage of Figaro with Simon Estes in the title role and Sarah Caldwell conducting in April 1969. He returned to Boston to sing the Ghost of Hector/Priam in Les Troyens (1972), Capellio in I Capuleti e i Montecchi (1975), and Osmin (1983). In 1977 he made his debut with the Canadian Opera Company as Sarastro in The Magic Flute.

On the concert stage Beattie was active with several major American orchestras, including the Boston Symphony Orchestra, the New York Philharmonic, and the Philadelphia Orchestra among others. In May 1968, one month after the assassination of Martin Luther King Jr., Beattie performed as a soloist in a concert at Carnegie Hall honoring King.

== Work as an educator ==
Beattie was also a voice teacher on the faculties of several institutions, including Syracuse University (1950–1952), Pennsylvania State University (1952–1953), the University of Buffalo (1953–1958), and Hofstra University (1959–1982). At Hofstra he was also director of the opera theatre program and conducted the Hofstra College Chorus. He notably conducted a production of Gian Carlo Menotti's Amahl and the Night Visitors at Hofstra in 1963 that starred Madeline Kahn as the Mother and his son Mark Beattie as Amahl.

== Recordings ==
- L'incoronazione di Poppea by Claudio Monteverdi: Conductor Alan Curtis, Oakland Symphony Orchestra, University of California chorus, 1969
