= Yerma (opera) =

Opera by Heitor Villa-Lobos based on the eponymous tragedy by Garcia Lorca

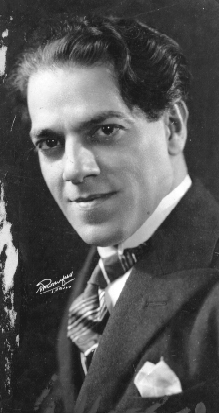
Heitor Villa-Lobos

Yerma is an opera in three acts by Heitor Villa-Lobos based on the tragedy of the same name by Federico García Lorca.

== History ==
Yerma was commissioned in 1955 by an old friend of Villa-Lobos, Hugh Ross, the conductor of the New York Schola Cantorum, and by John Blankenship, at that time head of the drama department at Sarah Lawrence College. The original plan was that García Lorca's play would be translated into English by the Scottish poet Alastair Reid, but Villa-Lobos immediately began setting the original Spanish text. It was composed partly in New York, partly in Paris, and was finished in 1956.

Yerma was first performed by the Santa Fe Opera in Santa Fe, New Mexico, on August 12, 1971 (erroneously reported in one source as July 12), and repeated just once, on August 18. The Santa Fe premiere was produced by Basil Langton, choreographed by José Limón, with scenery by Allen Charles Klein. Paintings by Giorgio de Chirico were projected on the walls during the intermissions.

In 1983 the opera was staged for the first time in Brazil, at the Teatro Municipal in Rio de Janeiro, with Aurea Gomez and Benito Maresca, conducted by Mário Tavares, and in 1987 this Spanish-language opera was performed for the first time in a Spanish-speaking country, at the Teatro Solís in Montevideo. The title role was sung by the Mexican soprano María Luisa Tamez, supported by Brazilian tenor Benito Maresca and Uruguayan baritone Fernando Barabino. Staging was by Jorge Curi, and David Machado conducted. A concert version was presented from July 12–21, 1989 by Opera on the Move in the Queen Elizabeth Hall at the Southbank's Latin American Festival, "Viva!", with Anna Steiger in the title role and Odaline de la Martinez conducting, while the European staged premiere was given by the Bielefeld Opera in 1991. The opera was given its second staging in Brazil at the Teatro Amazonas in Manaus in April 2010. The lead roles were taken by Eliane Coelho, Marcelo Puente, Homero Velho, and Keila de Moraes. Marcelo de Jesus conducted.

== Roles ==
Roles, voice types, premiere cast
Role	Voice type	Premiere cast, 12 August 1971 Conductor: Christopher Keene
Yerma	soprano	Mirna Lacambra
Juan, her husband	tenor	John Wakefield
Victor, Yerma's youthful lover	baritone	Theodor Uppman
Maria, Yerma's friend	mezzo-soprano	Frederica von Stade
An old woman	mezzo-soprano	Elaine Bonazzi
Dolores	mezzo-soprano	Judith Farris
Masked Man	tenor	C. Allen Barker
Masked Woman	soprano	Barrie Smith
1st Laundress	soprano	Karen A. Barlar
2nd Laundress	soprano	Bonnie R. Bradley
3rd Laundress	soprano	Ellen Phillips
4th Laundress	mezzo-soprano	Barbara Sacks
5th Laundress	mezzo-soprano	Barrie Smith
6th Laundress	mezzo-soprano	Ellen Vincent
Young Girl		Roslyn Jhunever
Young Girl		Linda Rasmussen
Another Girl, Dolores's daughter		Judith Farris
Yerma's sister-in-law		Martha Ann Thigpen
Yerma's sister-in-law		Susan Treacy
Female singer		Barrie Smith
Male singer		C. Allen Barker
Voice of a child		Jack Stanton

== Reception ==
Despite the fact that it occurred twelve years after the composer's death, the Santa Fe premiere of Yerma attracted widespread attention from the press, not only from American publications like the New York Times and Newsweek, but also from several Swiss newspapers and the Brazilian daily, Jornal do Brasil, the latter no doubt because the opera was the work of the most distinguished Brazilian composer of his time.

== Recordings ==
- Villa-Lobos: Yerma. Mirna Lacambra Domènech, John Wakefield, Frederica von Stade, Theodor Uppman, Elaine Bonazzi. conductor: Christopher Keene. Live recording, August 12, 1971, Santa Fe. CD recording, 2 audio discs: analogue, 4¾ in., stereo. CDALD4442S]. Duluth, Georgia: House of Opera, n.d.
