= Marquise (film) =

1997 film by Véra Belmont

- Theatrical release poster
- Directed by: Véra Belmont
- Screenplay by: Véra Belmont; Marcel Beaulieu; Jean-François Josselin; Gérard Mordillat
- Produced by: Véra Belmont; J. David Williams
- Starring: Sophie Marceau; Bernard Giraudeau; Lambert Wilson
- Cinematography: Jean-Marie Dreujou
- Edited by: Martine Giordano; Babak Karimi
- Music by: Jordi Savall
- Production companies: Stéphan Films; France 3 Cinéma; AMLF
- Distributed by: AMLF
- Release dates: 20 August 1997 (France); 12 September 1997 (USA)
- Running time: 122 minutes
- Country: France
- Language: French
- Budget: $11.5 million
- Box office: $6.3 million

Marquise is a 1997 French dramatic film directed by Véra Belmont, and starring Sophie Marceau, Bernard Giraudeau, and Lambert Wilson. Written by Jean-François Josselin, Véra Belmont, Marcel Beaulieu and Gérard Mordillat, the film is about a dancer and actress, based on the historical actress Marquise-Thérèse de Gorla, who rises from obscurity to win the hearts of some of France's most prominent citizens, including Moliere, Jean Racine, and King Louis XIV. She is helped in her career by a rotund comic, who falls in love with her, marries her, and brings her to Paris to launch her career. Despite her intimate involvement with other men, she keeps a special place in her heart reserved only for her unlikely spouse. Set in seventeenth century France, the film was shot on location in Lombardy and Emilia-Romagna, Italy, from September through December 1996.

Marquise was released on 20 August 1997 in France, and on 12 September 1997 in the United States. The film received generally positive reviews, with Variety magazine's Lisa Nesselson calling it "entertaining without being taxing", and Paul Fischer on the Urban Cinefile website calling it "masterful entertainment on a grand scale, an intelligent and fascinating insight into 17th century French society". Marquise was nominated for the AFI Fest Grand Jury Prize, the British Independent Film Award for Best Foreign Independent Film, and the César Award for Best Music.

== Plot ==
While four actresses from Molière's itinerant theatrical troupe set off looking for a latrine, Molière (Bernard Giraudeau) and his best friend Gros-Rene (Patrick Timsit) discover Marquise (Sophie Marceau) dancing before an eager crowd of men. Her movements are provocative and are heightened by a heavy rain that drenches her hair and clothes. The men offer her coins for her performance, which are pocketed by Marquise's father. Gros-Rene immediately falls in love with Marquise. While an elderly gentlemen has his way with her, Gros-Rene proposes to her, promising that she will end up on a Paris stage if she accepts, which she does.

Although the beautiful Marquise and the balding portly Gros-Rene make an unlikely couple, their relationship is sustained by his unquestioning adoration and her reciprocal affection. While Marquise continues to sleep with other men, her love for her husband is unchanging. Marquise is next attracted to the budding playwright Racine (Lambert Wilson), who "coaches" her privately. When Louis XIV (Thierry Lhermitte) bans Molière's Tartuffe, Racine writes a new tragedy Andromaque and Marquise gets her big break. Marquise's performance in Andromaque brings her acclaim. Written for his beloved in 1667, the tragedy assured Racine's reputation as a playwright. Unfortunately, the performances take their toll on Marquise and lead to a tragic end.

== Cast ==
- Sophie Marceau as Marquise
- Bernard Giraudeau as Molière
- Lambert Wilson as Racine
- Patrick Timsit as Gros René
- Thierry Lhermitte as Louis XIV
- Anémone as La Voisin
- Remo Girone as Jean-Baptiste Lully
- Georges Wilson as Floridor
- Franck de la Personne as Monsieur Phillipe d'Orleans
- Marianne Basler as Madame Henrietta of England
- Romina Mondello as Armande
- Estelle Skornik as Marie
- Victoria Peña as Queen Maria Theresa of Spain
- Christine Joly as Madeleine
- Olivier Achard as Monsieur de Saint-Loup
- Patrice Melennec as Giacomo de Gorla père de Marquise
- Anne-Marie Philipe as Catherine de Brie
- Christine Joly as Madeleine Béjart
- Beatrice Palme as Geneviève
- Francisco Casares as Gorgibus (as Paco Casares)
- Guillermo Antón as Charles
- Eric Boucher as Brécourt
- Stéphane Boucher as Louis Béjart

== Production ==
Marquise was filmed on location in Sabbioneta, Mantua in Lombardy, Italy, and in Soragna, Parma in Emilia-Romagna, Italy. Principal photography ran from September through the end of December 1996. Scenes of the royal court were filmed at Vaux-le-Vicomte.

== Release ==
Marquise was released on 20 August 1997 in France. The film was released in the United States the following month, on 12 September 1997. It was shown at the Venice International Film Festival from 27 August through 6 September 1997, at the Toronto International Film Festival 4–13 September 1997, and at a special screening at the Tokyo International Film Festival 1–10 November 1997.

== Reception ==
=== Critical response ===
The film received generally positive reviews. In her review for Variety magazine, Lisa Nesselson described the film as being "entertaining without being taxing". Nesselson went on to write:

The unpretentious dramedy manages to make viewers feel sophisticated and involved without requiring an advanced degree in French history. An attractive cast, bawdy subtext, lavish production design and peppy score are among the pleasures in Vera Belmont's energetically helmed pic, which should click nicely locally and offshore. ... In her fourth outing behind the camera, Belmont, who has produced nearly 30 films in as many years, including Quest for Fire and Farinelli, makes the era spring to life. Pic's first half is crammed full of incident and detail as if to say, "See—these really were interesting times," and auds readily will agree. Frivolity gradually gives way to deeper themes—artistic and romantic rivalry, remaining in favor at court, knowing when to be witty, when to be wily and when to weep. Dialogue features some risque banter and finely tuned insults but remains grounded and accessible.

Applauding the performances, Nesselson wrote, "Robust and spirited without showing off, Marceau has all the creamy-breasted allure and most of the grace required to turn heads and accrue glory. As her husband, Timsit is ardent and touching. And in a far from obvious casting choice, Lhermitte scores as the King." Nesselson praised Jordi Savall's score, calling it"a delight", and applauded the "alacrity" of the cinematography and editing, which effectively convey the "mud, muck and rabble as well as the sumptuous pomp of the day."

In her review for Urban Cinefile, Lousie Keller described the film as "a colourful period piece that captures the lusty spirit of the 17th century with its fire, frivolity and passion." Keller praised the entire "top notch" cast for their performances:

Sophie Marceau is dazzling as the alluring Marquise: she captivates at every turn with her coquettish style and delicate beauty. Disarmingly casual about her morals, yet virtuous in spirit, Marquise is the very epitome of the femme fatale: a goddess of feminine wiles, a bewitching enchantress. Patrick Timsit is poignant as Gros René, her loyal and faithful husband. He is the theatre troope’s buffoon - the true sad clown; Lambert Wilson is enigmatic as Racine; Lhermitte is delightfully engaging as the Sun King.

Keller also praised the "excellent" production design, the "beguiling" cinematography, and the director, Vera Belmont, who "invests passion and energy in this entertaining romp which delicately balances comedy and tragedy on the fickle seesaw of life."

In his review for Urban Cinefile, Paul Fischer called the film "lavish, sexy, funny, poignant" and a "masterful entertainment on a grand scale, an intelligent and fascinating insight into 17th century French society." Fischer singled out the performance of Sophie Marceau and her portrayal of the "luminous" Marquise:

From street urchin to prostitute to courtesan to tragedian, this femme fatale of contradictions is the stuff of passionate drama, and she's lovingly created in this exemplary film. Sophie Marceau is tailor made for this woman, who leaves her poverty-stricken world behind her for a short life in the Parisian theatre. Marceau is a magical vision on screen, creating a haunting and hypnotic character, conveying her complexities with pure skill and intellect.

Fischer also praised the production design and cinematography, in what he described as a visually "breathtaking, beautifully shot and costumed" period piece:

While many period films tend to present an old fashioned view of history, Marquise is a rollicking joyous work, a film which is set in the past but has a sharp, contemporary vision. And like the best of theatre, it deals with the tragic and the comic in a deft and beautifully executed manner. In all, Marquise is an exuberant, sexy and rollicking entertainment.

=== Accolades ===
Award	Category	Nominee	Result	Ref
AFI Film Festival 1997	Grand Jury Prize	Véra Belmont	Nominated	
British Independent Film Awards	Best Foreign Independent Film	Véra Belmont	Nominated	
César Award	Best Music	Jordi Savall	Nominated	
