= Peter Herman Adler =

American conductor (1899–1990)

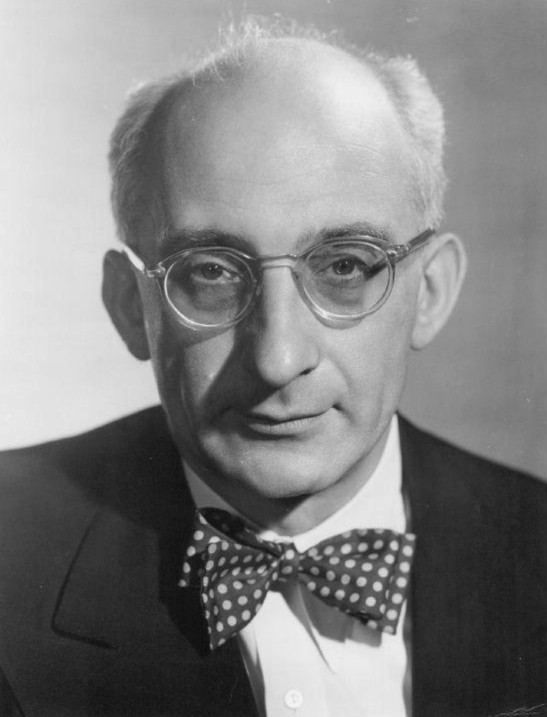
Peter Herman Adler, 1951

Peter Herman Adler (December 2, 1899 – October 2, 1990) was an American conductor.

== Career ==
Adler was born in Gablonz an der Neiße, Austria-Hungary, which is now in the Czech Republic. While at the Prague Conservatory, he studied with Vítězslav Novák, Fidelio Finke, and Alexander von Zemlinsky. In the 1930s, he was music director of the Bremen State Opera (likely the Stadttheater am Wall, destroyed in Allied bombings in 1944) and of the State Philharmonia of Kiev. He also appeared throughout Europe as a guest conductor.

In 1939, he fled Europe and immigrated to America. Several of his relatives on both sides of his family were murdered in the Holocaust.

Adler made his debut with the New York Philharmonic in 1940. He was the music and artistic director of the NBC Opera Theatre (1950–1964) and the National Educational Television Opera. He was a pioneer of televised broadcast of opera, commissioning such works as Gian Carlo Menotti's Amahl and the Night Visitors and Maria Golovin, Norman Dello Joio's The Trial at Rouen, and Bohuslav Martinů's The Marriage; Jack Beeson's My Heart's in the Highlands, Thomas Pasatieri's The Trial of Mary Lincoln, and Hans Werner Henze's La Cubana. Adler was also involved in the early career development of such singers as Leontyne Price, George London and Mario Lanza. He later conducted the Baltimore Symphony Orchestra from 1959 to 1968. He conducted the United States premiere of Ernst Bloch's opera Macbeth at the Juilliard School in May 1973.

Adler made only one foray into movies, adapting the music for The Great Caruso in 1950, for which he received an Academy Award nomination.

Adler died in Ridgefield, Connecticut in 1990. He never married nor had children, and was survived by a nephew.
