= Lizzie Borden (disambiguation) =

Lizzie Borden (1860–1927) was an American woman accused and acquitted of murdering her father and stepmother.

Lizzie Borden or Lizzy Borden may also refer to:

- Lizzie Borden (director) (born 1958), American filmmaker
- Lizzy Borden (actress) (born 1976), American pornographic actress and former wrestler
- Lizzy Borden (band), American heavy metal band
- Lizzie Borden (opera), opera by Jack Beeson
