= Jennie Tourel =

American opera singer

Jennie Tourel (22 June [O.S. 9 June] 1900 – November 23, 1973) was an American operatic mezzo-soprano, known for her work in both opera and recital performances.

Jennie Tourel

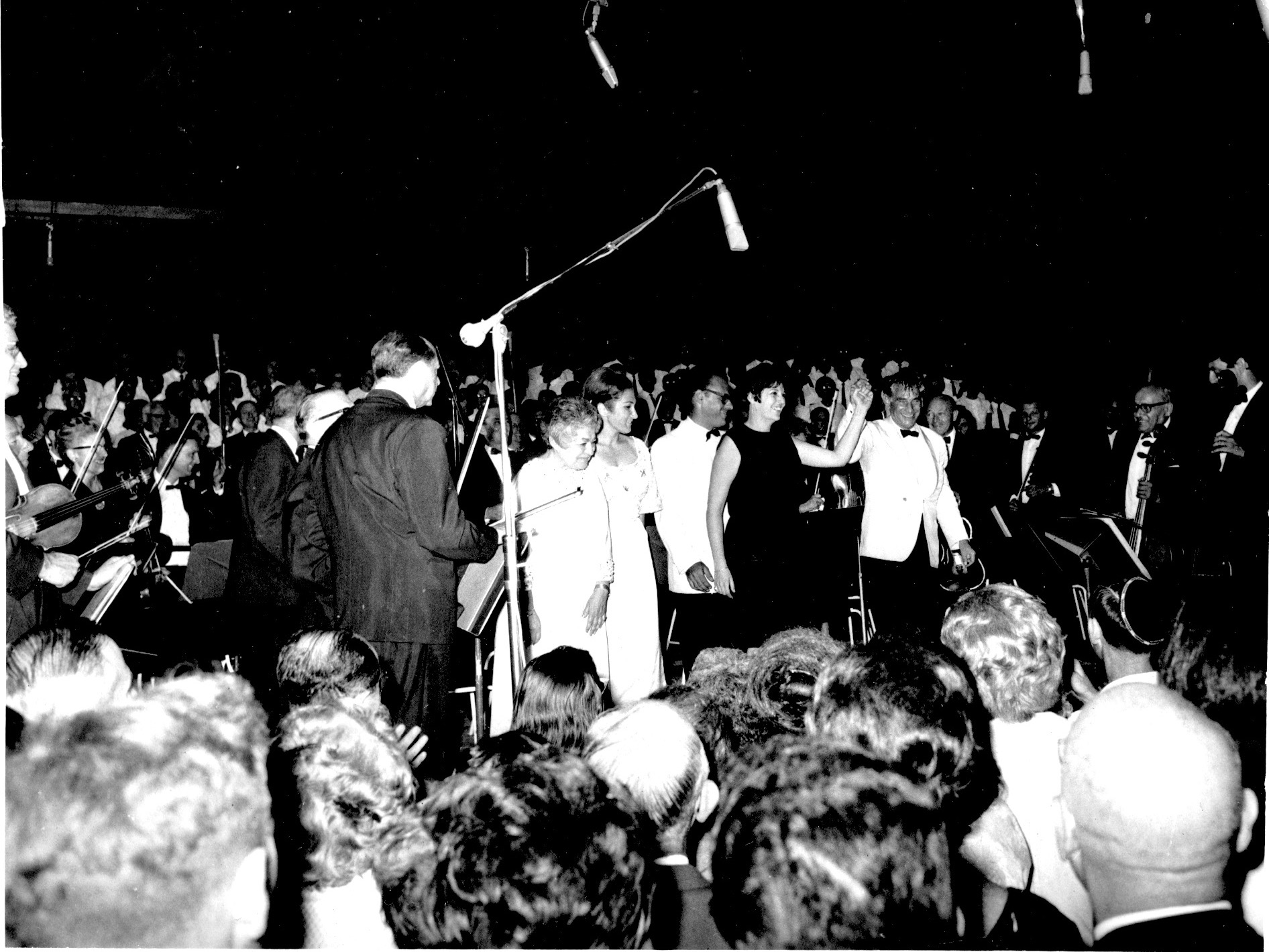
Jennie Tourel, Netania Davrath, Ruth Mense and Leonard Bernstein, 1967

== Early years ==
Tourel was born in Vitebsk in the Russian Empire (now in Belarus), with the surname Davidovich. As a young girl she played the flute, then studied piano. After the Russian Revolution, her Jewish family left Russia and settled temporarily near Danzig. They later moved to Paris, where she continued to study piano and contemplated a concert career. She then began to take voice lessons with Reynaldo Hahn and Anna El-Tour, and decided to devote herself to professional singing. She was said to have changed her last name to Tourel by transposing the syllables of El-Tour's name, but she denied this.

== Singing career ==
Jennie Tourel made her European operatic debut at the Opéra Russe in Paris in 1931, and subsequently sang at the Opéra-Comique in Paris as Carmen, (April 9, 1933) also singing Mignon, Jacqueline (Le médecin malgré lui), Djamileh in 1938, Charlotte (Werther) and Marcellina (The Marriage of Figaro) in 1940. She created three roles at the Salle Favart: Labryssa in Tout Ank Amon (May 5, 1934), Missouf in Zadig (June 24, 1938) and Zouz in La nuit embaumée (March 25, 1939).

She made her American début at the Chicago Civic Opera in Ernest Moret's Lorenzaccio in 1930. Her career at the Metropolitan Opera was brief: she made her début in May 1937, as Mignon, and appeared for a few seasons in the 1940s as Rosina, Adalgisa and Carmen.

In 1940, just before the occupation of Paris by Nazi troops, she went to Lisbon, and eventually emigrated to the United States. She became a naturalized American citizen in 1946. In 1951 she created the role of Baba the Turk in Stravinsky's The Rake's Progress. She gave the first performances of songs by Leonard Bernstein (including the song cycles I Hate Music, 1943, and La Bonne Cuisine, 1949), Francis Poulenc and Paul Hindemith (notably the revised Marienleben cycle, 1949).

== Teaching and later years ==
In later years, Jennie Tourel devoted herself to recitals and orchestra engagements, excelling particularly in French repertoire. Her last opera performance was as Doña Marta in the world premiere of Thomas Pasatieri's Black Widow at the Seattle Opera in 1972.

She also taught at the Juilliard School of Music in New York, at the Aspen School of Music in Colorado, and at the American Institute of Musical Studies in Graz, Austria. One of her most famous students was the soprano Barbara Hendricks, who first met Tourel in Colorado and later worked with her at Juilliard. Her other students included Joanna Bruno. In 1998, Hendricks paid tribute to her teacher with a recording of art songs titled: Récital "Hommage à Jennie Tourel"

Tourel died on November 23, 1973, in New York City.
