= Ellen Faull =

American operatic soprano

Ellen Faull

Ellen Hartla Faull (14 October 1918 – 2 December 2008) was an American operatic soprano and voice teacher. Born in Pittsburgh, Pennsylvania, she was primarily associated with New York City Opera, where she sang from 1947 until 1978 and created the role of Abigail Borden in Jack Beeson's opera Lizzie Borden in its 1965 world premiere. After her retirement from the opera stage, she taught singing at Sarah Lawrence College, the Manhattan School of Music and the Juilliard School and later privately at her home in Camas, Washington.

== Biography ==
Ellen Faull was born in Pittsburgh, Pennsylvania to a working-class family. During the Great Depression, she and her brothers and sisters went door-to-door selling their mother's home-baked bread to bring in extra money. She showed an early talent for singing and while still a teenager, her teacher introduced her to the conductor Eugene Ormandy who let her use his private box for all of the Philadelphia Orchestra's concerts. She went on to study at the Curtis Institute of Music in Philadelphia and later in New York City.

As an opera singer, she sang throughout the United States and occasionally in Europe, but she was primarily associated with New York City Opera. She made her debut there in 1947 as Donna Anna in the company's first production of Don Giovanni and continued to sing leading roles with the company until 1978. Her final performance there was as Abigail in Jack Beeson's Lizzie Borden, a role she had created in the opera's world premiere in 1965. As a recitalist, Faull was a champion of contemporary American composers. Ned Rorem once described her voice as "a cloud of peridot chiffon", and she sang in the world premieres of several of his works, including the 1957 premiere of The Poet's Requiem for soprano, chorus and orchestra.

Following her retirement from the stage, she taught singing for many years at the Manhattan School of Music and the Juilliard School. She also had a voice studio in the apartment on Central Park West in New York City which she shared with her husband, Maurice Gordon, a psychiatrist who died in 1987. When she moved to the Pacific Northwest in 1990 to be near her daughter, she taught singing both privately and at Portland State University's Bel Canto Northwest Vocal Institute, a summer program which she founded in 1992 with Ruth Dobson, a former voice professor at Portland State. She continued to teach singers at her home in Camas, Washington right up until her death in 2008 at the age of 90. Amongst her many students were Dawn Upshaw, Gianna Rolandi, Youngok Shin, Audra McDonald, Ashley Putnam, Beverly Hoch, Sarah Brightman, Gwen Verdon and Veronica Villarroel.
