= Walter Engelmann =

Walter Engelmann may refer to:

- Walter Engelmann (gymnast), gymnast who represented Germany at the 1912 Summer Olympics
- Walter Engelmann, fictional character in the opera Frau Margot
