= Frank Corsaro =

American stage director (1924–2017)

Frank Corsaro (December 22, 1924, New York City, New York – November 11, 2017, Suwanee, Georgia) was one of America's foremost stage directors of opera and theatre. His Broadway productions include The Night of the Iguana (1961).

== Career ==
A graduate of De Witt Clinton High School, he made his operatic directing debut at the New York City Opera in 1958 with a staging of Carlisle Floyd's Susannah. It was this production that the company took to the Brussels World's Fair that year, starring Phyllis Curtin, Norman Treigle and Richard Cassilly.

He became one of the City Opera's leading directors, creating such important productions as Prokofiev's The Fiery Angel, Verdi's La traviata (with Patricia Brooks and Plácido Domingo), Puccini's Madama Butterfly, Robert Ward's The Crucible (featuring Chester Ludgin), Gounod's Faust (with Beverly Sills and Treigle), Borodin's Prince Igor, Janáček's The Makropulos Affair (with Maralin Niska), Lee Hoiby's Summer and Smoke, Cherubini's Médée (in the Italian version), Korngold's Die tote Stadt (with Carol Neblett), Janáček's The Cunning Little Vixen (in designs by Maurice Sendak) and Bizet's Carmen.

Corsaro directed the world premieres of two of Floyd's later operas, Of Mice and Men (1970) and Flower and Hawk (1972). He made his Metropolitan Opera debut in 1984, with Handel's Rinaldo, starring Marilyn Horne and Samuel Ramey.

Corsaro wrote several librettos for operas, including Heloise and Abelard by Stephen Paulus and Frau Margot by Thomas Pasatieri whose opera, The Seagull, he directed at its premiere.

As an actor, Corsaro appeared as Hector Jonas opposite Joanne Woodward in the 1968 film Rachel, Rachel, directed by her husband, Paul Newman. In 1988, he became the head of the Actors Studio.

== Bibliography ==
- Maverick, by Frank Corsaro, Vanguard Press, 1978. ISBN 0-8149-0790-3

Preceded by Ellen Burstyn	Artistic Director of the Actors Studio; 1988-1995	Succeeded by Arthur Penn
