= Theodor Uppman =

American opera singer (1920–2005)

Uppman as Britten's Billy Budd in 1951.

Theodor Uppman (12 January 1920 – 17 March 2005) was an American operatic baritone. He is best known for his creation of the title role in Benjamin Britten's opera Billy Budd.

Uppman, of Swedish descent, was born in San Jose, California, and studied voice at the Curtis Institute of Music in Philadelphia and privately with Beverley Peck Johnson in New York City. He made his professional debut in 1941 with the Northern California Symphony Orchestra. His career was sparked by his 1947 concert performance as Pelléas in Debussy’s Pelléas et Mélisande, with the San Francisco Symphony Orchestra under Pierre Monteux, and Maggie Teyte as Mélisande. He soon reprised the role with the New York City Opera in 1948 and in his debut with the Metropolitan Opera on 27 November 1953.

Although he quit singing in 1951 to work in the California oil industry, he was persuaded to come back to opera to perform in the premiere of Billy Budd a short time later at the Royal Opera House, Covent Garden. Britten originally had Geraint Evans in mind for the role, but he withdrew because its tessitura was too high for his voice, and he sang another part. The composer conducted, there were 17 curtain calls, and Uppman was acclaimed as a new star.

Uppman sang 395 performances in fourteen roles during a 24-year career with the Metropolitan Opera, most frequently in Mozart operas: 98 performances as Masetto in Don Giovanni and 60 performances as Papageno in The Magic Flute. He also appeared as Guglielmo in 24 performances of Così fan tutte. While with the Met he virtually owned the role of Paquillo in Offenbach’s La Périchole, singing in every one of its 54 performances, from its Metropolitan premiere on 21 December 1956, through the performance in Detroit on 27 May 1971. Another frequent role, Sharpless in Puccini’s Madama Butterfly, he sang 37 times; Sharpless was the role of his farewell performance with the Met on 8 April 1978. In 1983 he sang the seven baritone roles in Britten's Death in Venice in Geneva.

A supporter of new American operas, Uppman also created roles in Carlisle Floyd’s Passion of Jonathan Wade (with Phyllis Curtin and Norman Treigle), Heitor Villa-Lobos's Yerma in 1971, Thomas Pasatieri’s Black Widow in 1972, and Leonard Bernstein’s A Quiet Place (opposite Chester Ludgin).

Uppman was known for his dramatic characterization as well as for his curly blond locks and good looks.

In his later years he became a professor of voice, teaching at both Mannes College of Music (from 1977) and the Manhattan School of Music (from 1988) until his death.

Uppman married Jean Seward in 1943. The couple had two children. He died in New York City.
