= Patricia Brooks =

American lyric soprano (1933–1993)

- Born: November 7, 1933
- Died: January 22, 1993 (aged 59)
- Occupations: Opera singer, actress

Patricia Brooks (November 7, 1933 – January 22, 1993) was a lyric soprano, actress, and opera singer, who performed primarily with the New York City Opera. She was known for her acting ability as much as for her voice.

== Biography ==
Brooks was born in Manhattan and attended the High School of Music and Art, studying dance with Martha Graham. Following a knee injury, she turned to theatrical performance, studied singing with Margaret Harshaw and Daniel Ferro, and studied acting with Uta Hagen.

In 1960, she was performing as a member of the chorus in the Broadway musical The Sound of Music and left to make her debut at the New York City Opera on October 12 as Marianne in Der Rosenkavalier.

Brooks performed 29 roles with the New York City Opera in the 1960s and 1970s. Peter G. Davis of the New York Times called her performance as the title character of Massenet's Manon "extraordinary," writing that she "sang splendidly" and "captured all the multiple facets of this intriguing character with a variety of dramatic nuance." With the Opera Society of Washington, she performed the finale to Act I of Mozart's The Magic Flute at a White House state dinner during the Kennedy presidency. She performed arias from La sonnambula and Lucia di Lammermoor at the reopening of Ford's Theatre in Washington, D.C., on January 30, 1968.

She also appeared throughout the United States and at the Royal Opera at London's Covent Garden. She sang with Plácido Domingo in Verdi's La traviata in 1966 in a new production directed by Frank Corsaro and later sang in the same opera on the occasion of Domingo's U.S. conducting debut in 1973. She received outstanding reviews for many of her performances in such operas as Tales of Hoffmann, La Boheme, and Rigoletto. Her repertoire also included modern works. In her first season with the New York City Opera she performed in Werner Egk's The Inspector General. She appeared in the world premières of Robert Ward's The Crucible in 1961, Douglas Moore's Carry Nation in 1966, and Lee Hoiby's Natalia Petrovna in 1964. She sang the title role in Alban Berg's Lulu in 1974 at the Santa Fe Opera.

She retired in 1977 due to the effect of multiple sclerosis on her breathing, but continued to teach for several years and to direct productions as an associate professor at the State University of New York at Purchase. In her later years she spent time painting in oils and watercolor.

In 1953 she married Theodore Mann, artistic director and co-founder of Circle in the Square Theatre in midtown Manhattan. They had two sons, Andrew (1958) and Jonathan (1961).
