= Graham Clark (tenor) =

British opera singer (1941–2023)

- Clark in the 1990s
- Born: 10 November 1941; Littleborough, Lancashire, England
- Died: 6 July 2023 (aged 81)
- Education: Loughborough University
- Occupation: Classical tenor
- Organizations: English National Opera; Bayreuth Festival; Metropolitan Opera
- Awards: Olivier Award for Outstanding Achievement in Opera

Graham Ronald Clark (10 November 1941 – 6 July 2023) was an English operatic tenor, known for roles such as David in Wagner's Die Meistersinger von Nürnberg, and especially the character roles Loge and Mime in Der Ring des Nibelungen. He was a principal with the English National Opera from 1978 to 1985, and performed at leading European and North American opera houses after he was recognised at the Bayreuth Festival in 1981, returning for 15 seasons. Clark appeared at the Metropolitan Opera in 112 performances over 15 seasons. He took part in world premieres and recorded for major companies. He is remembered as a "superb, athletic actor with a strong, penetrating voice and exceptionally clear diction". Barry Millington from The Guardian summarised: "Though he made his career as a comprimario tenor, putatively subordinate to the principal roles, his incisively focused voice, hyperactive stage presence and musico-dramatic intelligence frequently conspired to make him the main attraction."

== Life and career ==
Clark was born in Littleborough, Lancashire, on 10 November 1941, where he began singing as a treble in the church choir. His parents were Ronald Clark, who was a customs officer, and Annie Clark. His father had sung in public as a senior chorister at St Martin-in-the-Fields and at the London College of Choristers, his grandmother in vaudeville as a young woman. He studied at Kirkham Grammar School and Loughborough College, and at Nottingham University qualified with a certificate of education, especially in physical education. He worked as head of physical education at several schools, in Oxford, Braintree in Essex, and Mexborough, Yorkshire. While head of department at the first sixth-form college in the country in Doncaster (1966 to 1969), Clark decided to sing just as a hobby, but wrote to Sadler's Wells Opera in London for a voice appraisal, which resulted in him meeting a senior member of their music staff, Tom Hammond, and a recommendation to take weekly lessons with Bruce Boyce. Becoming disenchanted with teaching he then studied for a masters degree in recreation management at Loughborough University, continued studies with Boyce in London, and then worked as a Senior Regional Officer of the Sports Council.

Having sung at the York Festival in June 1973, Clark auditioned for and joined the chorus of the Wexford Festival in 1973, and sang small roles in Prokofiev's The Gambler and Glinka's A Life for the Tsar. In Wexford Clark was noted by an agent who arranged an audition with Richard Bonynge; although apparently disinterested, a few days later Bonynge accepted him for a charity gala held at the Royal Opera House in London on 25 January 1975 with Joan Sutherland, Heather Begg, Clifford Grant and others in aid of Darwin, which had been devastated by Cyclone Tracy. The concert was televised and issued on LP by Decca as 'Darwin: Song for a City'.

=== Scottish Opera, English National Opera ===
The Covent Garden concert was heard by Scottish Opera's general manager Peter Hemmings, who auditioned him and offered him a full-time contract with the company; this meant a 70 per cent drop in salary. The Sports Council agreed to release him but advised him to return if singing didn't work out. His roles there included Pedrillo in Mozart's Die Entführung aus dem Serail, Jaquino in Beethoven's Fidelio, first Zorn and later David in Wagner's Die Meistersinger von Nürnberg and Brighella in Ariadne auf Naxos by Richard Strauss. Reflecting on his time at the company, Clark recalled "I was a total, raw beginner, a complete unknown who knew nothing about music, nothing about opera and I learnt the trade as I went along".

He first sang at the English National Opera in 1976, as the title role in the British premiere of Ginastera's Bomarzo. He joined the company in 1978, beginning as Rinucchio in Puccini's Gianni Schicchi. Other lead roles there included the title role in Offenbach's The Tales of Hoffmann, Hermann in Tchaikovsky's The Queen of Spades, Mephistopheles in Busoni's Doktor Faust in the first performance in the UK in 1986, and Alexis in The Gambler. He also performed as Rodolfo in Puccini's La bohème, and Rodney Milnes noted that "the top notes especially had a warm, bronzed quality without any loss of clarity or projection", and that he was able to portrait the character's development from "heedless self-obsession to an awareness heightened by tragedy with great insight". He came to realize however that it was "abundantly clear that my voice was not right for [Italian repertoire] I didn't have the sweetness" and that "the roles I was most interested in were those that had some sort of substantial character that I could get my teeth into". Many new roles at this time were in Russian opera: alongside Hermann and Alexis, these included Andrey in Mazeppa for Chelsea Opera Group, Grigory in Boris Godunov, and Don Juan in Dargomyzhsky's The Stone Guest; in Janáček he added Skuratov in From the House of the Dead (Welsh National Opera), Steva (Scottish Opera) and Gregor in The Makropoulos Case (ENO). He also appeared as Matej Brouček in Janácek's The Adventures of Mr Brouček. He remained with the company until 1985.

He appeared at the Welsh National Opera in Cardiff as Loge in Wagner's Das Rheingold and as Kuratov in Janácek's From the House of the Dead, and as Rossini's Count Ory at Opera North.

=== Bayreuth Festival ===
Clark became recognised internationally when he appeared at the Bayreuth Festival, first in 1981 as David, which became a signature role. He performed there in 1984 as the Steuermann in Der fliegende Holländer, in 1987 as Melot in Tristan und Isolde, and from 1988 as Loge and Mime in Der Ring des Nibelungen, to become the roles for which he is remembered. He performed them first in the production directed by Harry Kupfer and conducted by Daniel Barenboim. His performance as Loge was described: "Preening narcissistically ... in black leather, with a sculpted, blond, 1980s David Bowie-style hairpiece, he deployed a pungent, edgy tone very effectively to display his contempt for Wotan and the other gods." He described the character's music: "At times it is loud and declamatory whilst at others it is beautifully lyrical. It is also tight, brief, mocking, ironic and sarcastic, full of mood changes, with crisp, sharp, pointed and sarcastic alliteration."

He was Loge and Mime again from 2002 in the production by Jürgen Flimm and Ádám Fischer. Clark appeared at the festival in 16 seasons, in 122 performances.

=== Metropolitan Opera ===
Clark sang at the Metropolitan Opera in New York City first in 1985, as Stewa in Janácek's Jenůfa. Other roles there included Herod in Salome by Richard Strauss, the Captain in Alban Berg's Wozzeck in 1990, Captain Vere in Britten's Billy Budd in 1992, and Albert Gregor in Janácek's The Makropulos Affair in 1996. He participated there in the world premiere of Corigliano's The Ghosts of Versailles in 1991, described as "the slithery, acrobatic villain" Bégearss, alongside Teresa Stratas as Marie Antoinette. He appeared at the house in 112 performances over 15 seasons. In January 1991 he took part in the French premiere of Berio's Un re in ascolto as the stage director at the Opéra Bastille in Paris.

=== Royal Opera House ===
Clark performed at the Royal Opera House first as Mime in 1995, in the controversial production directed by Richard Jones, leaving a lasting impression o a reviewer from The Guardian who described the "terrifying sight of Graham Clark as the dwarf Mime, deranged by power lust, staring at the audience with penetrating, unblinking eyes and wearing the dress that belonged to Siegfried's mother, Sieglinde". He performed there also Captain Vere and several minor roles up to 2018. He performed the four grotesques in The Tales of Hoffmann in 2008, in John Schlesinger's 1980 production. He appeared there as the Marne Seargent in the world premiere of Iain Bell's In Parenthesis, a 2016 coproduction with the Welsh National Opera.

=== Others ===
He performed in Amsterdam – where he was very popular – the role of Mime in Wagner's Ring. He performed at Oper Frankfurt as the Fool in Reimann's Lear and in Janácek's The Makropoulos Case, and returned in the 2010s as Monsieur Taupe in Capriccio by Richard Strauss. His last role was in the world premiere of Pascal Dusapin's Macbeth Underworld at La Monnaie in Brussels in September 2019.

=== Personal life ===
Clark married Joan Lawrence in 1979. The couple had a daughter. Clark was diagnosed with bladder cancer, and fought the disease for around 20 years, with several surgeries.

Clark died on 6 July 2023, at age 81.

== Awards ==
Clark received nominations for the Opera Awards in the category of Outstanding Individual Achievement, in the years 1983, 1986, and 1993. He won the Olivier Award for Outstanding Achievement in Opera in 1986 for his role as Mephistopheles in Doktor Faust. He received an Emmy nomination for his role in The Ghosts of Versailles at the Metropolitan Opera in 1991. He received the Sir Reginald Goodall Memorial Award in 2001, and the Sherwin Award in 2009.

In 1999, Loughborough University awarded Clark an honorary doctorate, and he was made an honorary bachelor of science in 2009.

== Recordings ==
- Berg: Wozzeck (Hauptmann) - Berliner Staatskapelle, Daniel Barenboim (Warner); also a Teldec DVD (2007), filmed in April 1994.
- Busoni: Die Brautwahl (Thusman) - Berlin Staatskapelle, Daniel Barenboim (Teldec)
- Donizetti: Maria Padilla (Ruiz) - London Symphony Orchestra, Alun Francis (Opera Rara)
- Gay: The Beggar's Opera (Matt) - National Philharmonic Orchestra, Richard Bonynge (Decca)
- Janáček: The Makropulos Case (Count Hauk-Šendorf) - English National Opera, Charles Mackerras (Chandos)
- Ligeti: Le Grand Macabre (1997 version) (Piet the Pot) - Philharmonia Orchestra, Esa-Pekka Salonen (Sony)
- Schreker: Der Schatzgräber (Der Narr) - Netherlands Philharmonic Orchestra, Marc Albrecht (Challenge Classics)
- Strauss: Elektra (Aegisth) - West German Radio Symphony Orchestra, Semyon Bychkov (Profil)
- Strauss: Der Rosenkavalier (Valzacchi) - Dresdner Staatskapelle, Bernard Haitink (EMI)
- Wagner: Das Rheingold (Loge) - Bayreuth Festival Orchestra, Daniel Barenboim (Warner)
- Wagner: Siegfried (Mime) - Bayreuth Festival Orchestra, Daniel Barenboim (Warner)
- Weill: Der Silbersee (Loterriagent) - London Sinfonietta, Markus Stenz (RCA)

=== Video ===
- Offenbach: Les deux Aveugles (Giraffier) as part of the film by István Szabó Offenbach's Secret (1995)
- Wagner: Das Rheingold (Mime) - Residentie Orchestra, Harmut Haenchen (Opus Arte)
- Wagner: Das Rheingold (Loge) - Orquestra Simfònica del Gran Teatre del Liceu, Bertrand de Billy (Opus Arte)
- Wagner: Siegfried (Mime) - Orquestra Simfònica del Gran Teatre del Liceu, Bertrand de Billy (Opus Arte)
- Wagner: Die Meistersinger von Nürnberg (David) - Bayreuther Festspiele, Horst Stein (DG)
