= Daniel Ferro =

American opera singer and voice teacher

Daniel Ferro (born Daniel Eisen, 10 April 1921 – 18 November 2015) was an American bass-baritone and voice teacher. He was known primarily as a teacher whose students have included many prominent opera singers, but he also had a career as a singer himself both on the concert stage and in opera and musical theatre.

== Life and career ==
Ferro was born in New York as Daniel Eisen to a Jewish-American family. His father was Joseph Eisen, born in the province of Galicia, in the Austro-Hungarian Empire, and his mother was Pauline Greenberg Eisen, born in Holyoke, Massachusetts, to a father from New York and a mother from the Russian Empire, now southern Ukraine. He graduated from the Juilliard School of Music (in 1948) and from Columbia University. A Fulbright scholarship enabled him to pursue further vocal studies in Austria at the Salzburg Mozarteum and in Italy at the Accademia Chigiana and the Accademia Santa Cecilia. Early in his career he changed his surname from Eisen, the German word for iron, to Ferro, the Italian word for iron.

During the early 1950s, Ferro was member of the Graz Opera Company in Austria where his appearances included Mathis der Maler (Truchsess von Waldburg) and Parsifal (Titurel). He also appeared on European concert stages and toured with the Israel Philharmonic Orchestra. When Ferro returned to the United States in 1956, he took up an appointment as Associate Professor in the voice department at Butler University in Indiana. The 1960s found him in back in New York City, teaching at Hunter College and later at the Manhattan School of Music where he became chairman of the voice department. His student Cynthia Hoffmann would later also serve as chair of the voice department. During that time, he also performed in both musical theatre and opera, including leading roles in musicals with St. John Terrell's Company and other summer stock theatres, a revival of The Saint of Bleecker Street in New York City, and concert performances of Werther in Carnegie Hall and William Tell at Lincoln Center.

In 1972, Ferro joined the faculty of the Juilliard School, a post he held until his retirement as "vocal faculty emeritus" in 2006, after which he continued to give master classes there. However, his voice teaching extended far beyond Juilliard, both through his private voice studio in New York, and his master classes at many of the world's conservatories, including the Conservatoire de musique, Montréal, Royal Conservatory of Music in Toronto, Shanghai Conservatory of Music, Royal College of Music, Stockholm, Manhattan School of Music, and the Accademia Chigiana, where he was once a student. In France, he taught at the Opéra de Paris, Paris Conservatory, and Fondation Royaumont; in 1988, he was made an Officier de l'Ordre des Arts et des Lettres by the French government for his services to music. The many prominent opera singers who studied with Ferro include Evelyn Lear, Thomas Stewart, Kathleen Battle, Alan Titus, Rosalind Elias, Patricia Brooks, Sheri Greenawald, Ruth Welting, Youngok Shin, and Richard Stilwell.

In 1995, Ferro founded the Daniel Ferro Vocal Program, which takes place each summer in Greve in Chianti, Italy. The program includes master classes and private voice lessons for young singers, as well as public performances in the Castello di Verrazzano and the town's piazza and churches. In 2011, the program faculty and students celebrated Ferro's 90th birthday.

Ferro died on 18 November 2015. His first wife, Beth Hollinger Ferro, died in 1974. His second wife, Joy, and his sons Matthew and Jesse survive him.

== Recordings ==
• Gilbert & Sullivan: The Pirates of Penzance – Howard Kahl, William McGrath, Virginia Babikian, Rosalind Hupp, Maribeth Ostertag, Donald Johnston, Daniel Ferro, Ed Cabot. Studio recording, Louis Shankson conductor, Rondo Records ST-585, 1960.

• Rodgers & Hammerstein: The King and I – Barbara Cook, Theodore Bikel, Daniel Ferro, Jeanette Scovotti, Anita Darian. Studio recording, Lehman Engel conductor, Columbia Records, 1964. Re-released on CD by Sony Broadway in 1993.
