= Le Médecin volant =

French play by Molière

Le Médecin volant (The Flying Doctor) is a French play by Molière, The date of its actual premiere is unknown, but its Paris premiere took place on 18 April 1659. Parts of the play were later reproduced in L'Amour médecin, and Le Médecin malgré lui. It is composed of 15 scenes and has seven characters largely based on stock commedia dell'arte roles.

== Characters ==
- Gorgibus, an old nobleman, the father of Lucile (Commedia dell'Arte: Pantalone)
- Lucile, daughter of Gorgibus, engaged to Villebrequin (Commedia dell'Arte: Innamorata)
- Gros-René : Gorgibus' servant (role created by René Berthelot)
- Sabine, Lucile's cousin, the source of all the intrigue in the play (Commedia dell'Arte: Columbina)
- Valère : Lucile's lover (Commedia dell'Arte: Innamorato)
- Sganarelle: Hero of the play, valet to Valère. (Commedia dell'Arte: Arlecchino), role created by Molière
- A Lawyer (Commedia dell'Arte: Il Dottore)

== Plot ==
Gorgibus wants at all costs to marry Lucile to the old Villebrequin. However, Lucile loves Valère. Entrusting his love to Lucile's cousin Sabine and his valet Sganarelle (who takes on a double role as both himself and his twin "doctor" brother"), Valère is going to need all the help he can get to solve this problem.

== The flying doctor in comedy ==
The theme of the "Medico Volante" or "flying doctor" belongs to the traditional repertoire of 17th century Italian comedy. There are at least two anonymous commedia dell'arte plays known by this name, as well as one later Italian comedy, also anonymous, named Truffaldino medico volante, comedia nova e ridicula. These plays take the trope of the trickster who pretends to be a doctor and put him in a situation where he's forced to play his two roles one after the other, with increasingly short intervals, eventually reaching the point of the (seemingly impossible) simultaneous presence on stage of the two characters at the same time. The plays made along this storyline were named "flying doctor comedies" because the false doctor, who had to move quickly from the roof of a house to the ground floor and back (to create the illusion that he was two people), was attached by a rope to a hoop connected to the main beam of the stage, and he appeared to be flying when he was carried between the two locations.
