= René Berthelot =

French actor

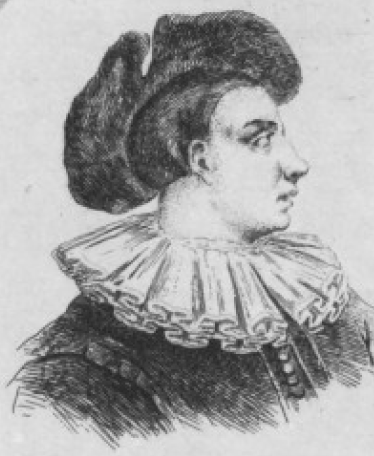
- Born: Nantes, France
- Died: 28 October 1664; Paris, France
- Other names: Du Parc; Gros René
- Known for: French actor and prominent member of Molière's theatre troupe

René Berthelot (English: /bɛərtəˈloʊ/ ber-tə-LOH, French: [ʁəne bɛʁtəlo]; died 28 October 1664), also known by his stage names Du Parc and Gros René, was a French actor and member of Molière's theatre troupe from 1647 to 1664.

== Life ==
René Berthelot was born in Nantes, the son of a bourgeois, Pierre Berthelot, and was already a member of Charles Dufresne's provincial theatre troupe when Molière joined in 1647. In 1653 he married Marquise-Thérèse de Gorla, who was also to become a leading member of Molière's troupe and performed as Mlle. Du Parc after their marriage. The couple had two children, a daughter Catherine born in 1659 and a son Jean-Baptiste-René born in 1663.

Possessed of a rotund physique even in his youth, Berthelot capitalised on his large size to comic effect and specialised in playing gluttonous valets. Molière wrote the recurring role of Gros-René ("Fat René") in Le Médecin volant, Le Dépit amoureux and Sganarelle expressly for him. Berthelot also created the role of Ergaste (Valère's valet) in Molière's L'École des maris and probably Barbouillé in his La Jalousie du Barbouillé. One of his last appearances was as Eté (the personification of Summer) riding atop a real elephant in one of the pageants organized by Molière as part of Plaisirs de l'Île enchantée, an extravagant 7-day festival celebrating the building of Versailles.

Berthelot died in Paris on 28 October 1664, with his funeral taking place the following day at Saint-Germain l'Auxerrois. After his death, Marquise-Thérèse de Gorla was widely rumoured to have had an affair with Racine. She died in mysterious circumstances in 1668. Her and Berthelot's son Jean-Baptiste-René had no interest in a theatrical career and joined the French merchant navy.
