= The Ghosts of Versailles =

English-language American opera

- Opera by John Corigliano
- Librettist: William M. Hoffman
- Language: English
- Based on: La Mère coupable by Pierre Beaumarchais
- Premiere: 19 December 1991; Metropolitan Opera, New York

The Ghosts of Versailles is an opera in two acts, with music by John Corigliano to an English libretto by William M. Hoffman. The Metropolitan Opera had commissioned the work from Corigliano in 1980 in celebration of its 100th anniversary, with the premiere scheduled for 1983. Corigliano and Hoffman took as the starting point for the opera the 1792 play La Mère coupable (The Guilty Mother) by Pierre Beaumarchais. They took seven years to complete the opera, past the initial deadline. The opera received its premiere on December 19, 1991, at the Metropolitan Opera, with the production directed by Colin Graham. The premiere run of seven performances was sold out. The original cast included Teresa Stratas, Håkan Hagegård, Renée Fleming, Graham Clark, Gino Quilico, and Marilyn Horne. The Metropolitan Opera revived the opera in the 1994/1995 season.

Corigliano considers this work a "grand opera buffa" because it incorporates both elements of the grand opera style (large chorus numbers, special effects) and the silliness of the opera buffa style. Commentators have noted how the opera satirises and parodies accepted operatic conventions.

== Performance history ==
Lyric Opera of Chicago staged the opera in the 1995/1996 season in the first performances outside of the Metropolitan Opera, in a lightly revised version that cut some expensive aspects of the Met's production, including an onstage orchestra.

In 2008, on Corigliano's recommendation, Opera Theatre of Saint Louis (OTSL) and Wexford Festival Opera in Ireland engaged composer John David Earnest to rework the score for chamber orchestra to make it suitable for performances in small houses. The world and European première performances of this version took place the following year with co-productions at OTSL and Wexford Festival Opera respectively.

The opera was supposed to be revived at the Metropolitan Opera in 2010. General Manager Peter Gelb had already invited Kristin Chenoweth to play the part of Samira, alongside Angela Gheorghiu as Marie Antoinette and Thomas Hampson as Beaumarchais. However, the production was canceled in 2008 because the weakened US economy at the time required the cutting of costs instead of launching an expensive production like this. The Metropolitan Opera's 1991 production was streamed online on June 11, October 31, and December 13, 2020.

The work was given its West Coast premiere in 2015 at Los Angeles Opera in a full-scale production starring Patricia Racette, Christopher Maltman and Patti LuPone, conducted by James Conlon. The chamber version was part of the Wolf Trap Opera Company's 2015 season. The work was performed by the Miami Music Festival as part of their Summer 2018 and Summer 2025 seasons.

A new production directed by Jay Lesenger was mounted in July 2019 as part of the Glimmerglass Festival. This was a co-production with Cháteau de Versailles Spectacles, with a cast largely drawn from members of the Glimmerglass Young Artists program. It was presented again in December, 2019, at the Royal Opera in Versailles, and video-recorded.

In July 2019, Chautauqua Opera staged a production starring Caitlin Lynch, Daniel Belcher, and Marco Nistico, cast with members of the Chautauqua Opera Studio and Apprentice program as well as students from the Chautauqua Opera Conservatory. The production was directed by Peter Kazaras who originated the role of Count Almaviva in the Met Opera production. It was conducted by Steven Osgood with the Chautauqua Symphony Orchestra.

== Roles ==
Roles, voice types premiere cast
Role	Voice type	Premiere cast, 19 December 1991 Conductor: James Levine
Marie Antoinette	soprano	Teresa Stratas
Beaumarchais	baritone	Håkan Hagegård
Figaro	baritone	Gino Quilico
Susanna	mezzo-soprano	Judith Christin
Countess Rosina	soprano	Renée Fleming
Bégearss	tenor	Graham Clark
Count Almaviva	tenor	Peter Kazaras
Florestine	coloratura soprano	Tracy Dahl
Léon	tenor	Neil Rosenshein
Samira	mezzo-soprano	Marilyn Horne
Louis XVI	bass	James Courtney
Woman in a Hat	mezzo-soprano	Jane Shaulis
Cherubino	mezzo-soprano	Stella Zambalis
Suleyman Pasha	bass	Ara Berberian
Joseph	baritone	Kevin Short
Wilhelm	spoken role	Wilbur Pauley
The Marquis	tenor	Richard Drews
English Ambassador	bass	Philip Cokorinos

== Synopsis ==
The opera is set in an afterlife existence of the Versailles court of Louis XVI. In order to cheer up the ghost of Marie Antoinette, who is upset about having been beheaded, the ghost of the playwright Beaumarchais stages an opera (obviously based on La Mère coupable, although described by Beaumarchais as a new composition) using the characters and situations from his first two Figaro plays.

In this new opera-within-an-opera, Count Almaviva is in Paris as ambassador from Spain. Together with his trusty manservant Figaro, he tries to rescue Marie Antoinette from the French Revolution. When things go awry, Beaumarchais himself enters the opera and – with the invaluable help of Figaro and his wife Susanna – attempts to rescue the queen.

=== Act 1 ===
The ghosts of the court of Louis XVI arrive at the theatre of Versailles. Bored and listless, even the King is uninterested when Beaumarchais arrives and declares his love for the Queen. As Marie Antoinette is too haunted by her execution to reciprocate his love, Beaumarchais announces his intention to change her fate through the plot of his new opera A Figaro for Antonia.

The cast of the opera-within-the-opera is introduced. It is twenty years after the events of The Marriage of Figaro. Figaro appears, chased by his wife Susanna, his employer Count Almaviva, his many creditors and quite a lot of women claiming he is the father of their children. Figaro, now aging but still as wily and clever as ever, lists his many achievements in a lengthy aria. Meanwhile, Count Almaviva is engaged in a secret plan to sell Marie Antoinette's jeweled necklace (Note: See also: Affair of the Diamond Necklace) to the English ambassador to buy the Queen's freedom. The Count, Beaumarchais explains, is estranged from his wife Rosina due to her affair, years earlier with Cherubino. Though Cherubino is now dead, Rosina bore him a son, Léon. Léon wants to marry Florestine, Almaviva's illegitimate daughter (by a lady of the Court well-known to Marie Antoinette, according to Beaumarchais), but the Count has forbidden the union as retribution for his wife's infidelity and has promised Florestine instead to his friend Patrick Honoré Bégearss. (Note: For that name, see Nicolas Bergasse)

Figaro and Susanna enrage the Count by warning him that the trusted Bégearss is in fact a revolutionary spy. Figaro is fired, but overhears Bégearss and his dimwitted servant Wilhelm hatching a plot to arrest the Count that evening at the Turkish embassy when he sells the Queen's necklace to the English ambassador.

The Queen is still depressed, and Beaumarchais explains his intentions: Figaro will thwart the villains, the young lovers will be allowed to marry, and she herself will be freed and put on a ship bound for the New World, where he, Beaumarchais, will be waiting to entertain her. The King takes offense at this.

The Countess pleads with the Count on Léon's and Florestine's behalf, "aided" hypocritically (and therefore uselessly) by Bégearss, but the Count spurns her. Beaumarchais then enchants the Queen with a flashback, twenty years earlier, to Rosina's affair with Cherubino. In a beautiful garden, the lovers sing a rapturous duet, echoed by Beaumarchais and Marie Antoinette, who nearly kiss. They are interrupted by the King, who, enraged, challenges Beaumarchais to a duel. After a brief bit of swordplay, the King runs Beaumarchais through, but the wound has no effect because they are all already dead. The Ghosts find this hilarious, and have great fun stabbing each other.

Beaumarchais changes the scene to the Turkish embassy, to a wild party thrown by the Turkish ambassador Suleyman Pasha. Bégearss readies his men to arrest the Count, but Figaro intercepts the plot by infiltrating the party dressed as a dancing girl. During the outrageous performance of the Turkish singer Samira, Figaro steals the necklace from the Count before the sale can take place and runs away, hotly pursued by everybody else.

=== Act 2 ===
Beaumarchais sets up the beginning of the second act. Figaro returns, but to Beaumarchais' shock and the amusement of the Ghosts defies Beaumarchais's intention that he return the necklace to the queen, as he wants to sell it to help the Almavivas escape. To put the story back on course and despite the danger to himself, Beaumarchais enters the opera and shocks Figaro into submission by forcing him to witness the unfair trial of Marie.

The Count, swayed by his wife's wishes, rescinds his offer to Bégearss of his daughter's hand. Even though Figaro gives him the necklace, Bégearss is enraged and sends the Spaniards to the prison where Marie Antoinette lingers. Because of his entering the opera, Beaumarchais' powers are gone and he is weakened and unable to prevent the arrest, but he and Figaro manage to escape.

In prison, the Count realizes his foolishness and becomes reconciled with his wife, Florestine and Léon. Beaumarchais and Figaro arrive at the prison to try to rescue the Almavivas, but it is the Countess, Susanna and Florestine who come up with a plan: using their feminine wiles on poor Wilhelm, who is their jailer, they steal his keys, unlock their cell and, after locking him inside, attempt to flee. Bégearss and soldiers appear to prevent their escape with the Queen, and Bégearss viciously announces that Wilhelm will be executed as well for his failure. Figaro denounces Bégearss to the revolutionaries, revealing that he has kept the necklace rather than using it to feed the poor, and is backed up by Wilhelm. Bégearss is arrested as a traitor to the Revolution and dragged off, the Almavivas leave and Beaumarchais, after bidding a fond farewell to his favorite creation (i.e. Figaro), is left with the keys to the Queen's cell and proceeds to complete his plan. But the Queen refuses to let Beaumarchais alter the course of history; the power of his love has helped her to accept her fate and he has, in fact, freed her from her own fear and grief which have kept her as a ghost on Earth and she is now free to declare her own love for Beaumarchais. Events proceed: the Queen is executed; Figaro, Susanna and the Almavivas escape to America; and Marie Antoinette and Beaumarchais are united in Paradise.

== Reception ==
In 2015, Richard S. Ginell of the Los Angeles Times wrote that "many still differ as to whether 'Ghosts' has lived up to the hype and expense of its 1991 premiere at the Metropolitan Opera. But I love it, and I think it has a shot at immortality. It's comic and serious, entertaining and erudite, silly and thoughtful, emotional and mysterious, harrowing and uplifting, intimate and over-the-top – and the more times you see it, the more you'll find in it and the more you'll get out of it."

== Recordings ==
Up until recently, the only recordings were a VHS of a televised production from PBS' The Metropolitan Opera Presents in 1992 and a Constant Linear Velocity (CLV) LaserDisc of the same performance. The LaserDisc, published by Deutsche Grammophon, also includes a monochrome printed libretto. The LaserDisc version of the opera provides a digital sound track plus enhanced video resolution over the VHS recording. Graham Clark was nominated for an Emmy Award for his performance as Bégearss in this video. This recording was re-released on DVD on September 21, 2010, as part of the James Levine 40th anniversary DVD box set. It, like the other DVDs in the set, is now available separately. The enhanced video is also available for streaming with a Met Opera on Demand subscription or rental.

In April 2016, an audio recording of the Los Angeles Opera's 2015 production was released by Pentatone (PTC 5186538, a 2-SACD album). It won the 2017 Grammy Award for Best Engineered Album, Classical and for Best Opera Recording.
