= Marquise-Thérèse de Gorla =

French actress and ballerina

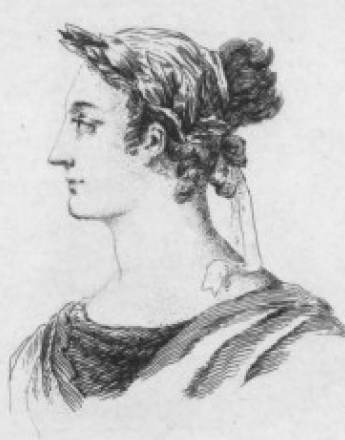
Marquise-Thérèse de Gorla

Marquise-Thérèse de Gorla, also known under her stage name Mademoiselle Du Parc (1633 – Paris, 11 December 1668), was a French actress and ballet dancer. She was one of the stars of Molière's company. She was also known for her love affairs and as an object of affection for many famous people.

== Biography ==
She was the daughter of Giacomo Gorla, who was an "operator" in Lyon in 1635. She seems to have started as a dancer and actress in a travelling troupe, before becoming a member of Molière's company in the city of Lyon. On 23 February 1653 she married one of her colleagues in the troupe, René Berthelot, who used the stage names Du Parc and, more descriptive, Gros-René (fat René). After the marriage she took on the stage name Mlle. Du Parc. He was an actor who specialized in playing the roles of servants, such as La Montagne in Molière's Les fâcheux (The Pests). Du Parc was the subject of poems by Corneille; rumors appeared of both Pierre and brother Thomas Corneille being infatuated with her.

The troupe of Molière having arrived at Paris, Du Parc performed before the monarch on 24 October 1658 in the Louvre in the role of Hippolytus, and then before the public at the Petit Bourbon. In the 1659–1660 season, the Du Parc couple was active in the Theatre du Marais. Around Easter 1660, they returned to the Molière's troupe, where she was the star performing lead roles in plays as well as ballets. Larousse and Lyonnet both relate the following testimony: "She made some notable antics, because we saw her legs and part of her thighs through its split skirt on both sides, with silk stockings attached to the top of panties," something which aroused great attention by contemporaries.

She suddenly left the band to join that of the Hôtel de Bourgogne and author Jean Racine. This quasi-kidnapping was the result of a quarrel between Racine and Molière. The latter, 18 years older, had provided the first aid, support, advice and sometimes its best actors. Racine wrote the role of Andromaque specifically for her.

=== Death ===
She died suddenly as one of the greatest stars in France. She was suspected to have been poisoned, but the probable cause of death seems to have been a miscarriage or an incompetent abortion. During the Poison Affair, Racine was pointed out by La Voisin, who claimed that Racine had poisoned de Gorla, but this claim was never examined.

== Legacy ==
She is the subject of the 1997 French language film Marquise.

She is a character in "The Shadow Queen" by Sandra Gulland.
