= Ashley Putnam =

American opera singer

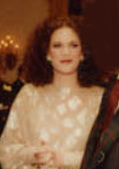
- Born: 10 August 1952 (age 73); New York City
- Occupation: Soprano

Ashley Putnam (born 10 August 1952) is an American soprano from New York City. Her professional singing career began in 1976 and has spanned over 30 years.

== Early life and career ==
Ashley Putnam began her music career playing the flute. Her mother was an amateur singer and was a regular soloist at the church where she also sang in the choir. The young Ashley began playing the flute and attended the Interlochen Center for the Arts in the summers during high school. Upon graduation from high school, Ashley enrolled at the University of Michigan School of Music as a flute major. There she sang in the university choirs and realized she had vocal potential when she was given solos in choir. She soon switched to a vocal major and, in 1973, was an apprentice singer with the Santa Fe Opera during its summer festival.

She completed her Bachelor of Music degree program in May, 1974, and then began her graduate studies at UM. She returned to Santa Fe's Apprentice Singer Program in summer 1975, and then finished her Master of Music degree in December, 1975. She notably studied singing with Ellen Faull. In the spring of 1976, Ashley was one of two winners of the Metropolitan Opera National Council Auditions.

== Professional career ==
After winning the MET Auditions, Ashley's career took off. Her operatic roles have included Violetta (La traviata), Mimi (La bohème), Lucia (Lucia di Lammermoor), Arabella (Arabella), Fiordiligi (Così fan tutte), Musetta (La bohème), Vitellia (La clemenza di Tito), Anna Maurrant (Street Scene), and many others.

Known for her wide-ranging repertoire, expressive acting, and glamorous presence, Putnam has performed in the world's most prestigious opera houses, including Covent Garden, Vienna Staatsoper, Berlin Staatsoper, La Fenice, and in the US, the Metropolitan Opera, Chicago Lyric Opera and San Francisco Opera.

Her concert credits include performances with the New York Philharmonic, the Concertgebouw, and the San Francisco Symphony.

Ashley Putnam is a former member of the voice faculty at the Manhattan School of Music, and has a private studio in New York. She has taught masterclasses throughout the country, adjudicates for the Metropolitan Opera National Council Auditions, and has served on the voice faculties of DePaul University and the Eastman School of Music of the University of Rochester. However, she was not a professor of voice at either institution.

== Recordings ==
Audio

- Puccini: La bohème, "Musetta"; Sir Colin Davis, conductor; Phillips, 1979.
- Thea Musgrave: Mary, Queen of Scots, "Mary"; Peter Mark, conductor; Moss Music, 1978.
- Divas of a Certain Age, "Diva II" and "Cecily"; Jay Meetze, conductor; Albany Records, 2006.

Video

- Street Scene, "Anna Maurrant"; German Television, Produced by Zambello, 1994.
- La clemenza di Tito, "Vitellia"; Glyndebourne, conducted by Sir Colin Davis, produced by Hytner, 1991.
- Così fan tutte, "Fiordiligi"; BBC, produced by Miller, 1985.
- Arabella, "Arabella"; Glyndebourne, conducted by Bernard Haitink, produced by Cox, 1984
