= Lizzie Borden (opera) =

American opera

Lizzie Borden is the sixth and best known opera by American composer Jack Beeson, commissioned by the Ford Foundation. The libretto by Kenward Elmslie after a scenario by Richard Plant is based on the real-life case of Lizzie Borden.

It was premiered on March 25, 1965, by the New York City Opera conducted by Anton Coppola and subsequently released on record. The roughly two-hour opera is in three acts and an epilogue and is published by Boosey & Hawkes.

== Roles ==
Role	Voice type	Premiere Cast, March 25, 1965 (Conductor: – Anton Coppola)
Lizzie Borden	mezzo-soprano	Brenda Lewis
Margret Borden, Lizzie's sister	soprano	Anne Elgar
Captain Jason MacFarlane, Margret's love interest	baritone	Richard Fredricks
Abigail Borden, the stepmother	soprano	Ellen Faull
Andrew Borden. Lizzie's father	baritone	Herbert Beattie
Reverend Harrington	tenor	Richard Krause

== Synopsis ==
The plot is a dramatic retelling of the famed double axe murders of the stepmother and the father of the title character in Fall River, Massachusetts. However a great number of dramatic changes are made for effectiveness on the stage.
