= Black Widow (opera) =

Opera in three acts by Thomas Pasatieri

- Opera by Thomas Pasatieri
- Librettist: Thomas Pasatieri
- Language: English
- Based on: Miguel de Unamuno's Dos madres
- Premiere: March 2, 1972; Seattle Opera

Black Widow is an opera in three acts by Thomas Pasatieri with an English libretto also by the composer. The libretto is based on Miguel de Unamuno's Dos madres. The opera premiered on March 2, 1972 with Seattle Opera. Lotfi Mansouri was the director. Other notable productions include Lake George Opera in 1972 and the Atlanta Civic Opera Association in 1981. The score was published by Belwin-Mills Publishing Corp. in 1977.

== Roles ==
Roles	Voice type	Premiere Cast March 2, 1972 (Conductor: - Henry Holt)
Raquel, the "Black Widow"	mezzo-soprano	Joanna Simon
Juan, Raquel's lover and Berta's husband	baritone	Theodor Uppman
Berta, Juan's wife	soprano	Evelyn Mandac
Doña Marta, Berta's mother	mezzo-soprano	Jennie Tourel
Don Pedro, Berta's father	tenor	David Lloyd

== Story ==
The work deals with a young widow, Raquel, who is unable to have a child but is so obsessed with the idea that having a child would give her immortality that she forces her lover, Juan, to marry another woman (Berta) so that they can have a child that she can take from them. Juan kills himself after giving the child to Raquel. Berta goes insane and triumphant Raquel becomes the caregiver of both Berta and her child.
