= The Seagull (opera) =

Opera by Thomas Pasatieri

- Opera by Thomas Pasatieri
- Librettist: Kenward Elmslie
- Language: English
- Based on: Anton Chekhov's The Seagull
- Premiere: March 5, 1974; Houston Grand Opera

The Seagull is an opera in three acts by Thomas Pasatieri to an English libretto by Kenward Elmslie. The plot is based on Anton Chekhov's 1896 play, The Seagull.

== Performance history ==
The work had its world premiere at Houston Grand Opera on 5 March 1974 conducted by Charles Rosekrans. Notable later productions include Seattle Opera (1976), Washington National Opera (1978), Atlanta Civic Opera (1980), Fort Worth Opera (1982) and the Manhattan School of Music (2002). On 23 April 2004, a revised version premiered at the San Francisco Opera Center, a resident artist program of San Francisco Opera. In September 2010 The Seagull was performed at Dicapo Opera in New York City as part of the international Armel Opera Competition and Festival. A European premiere will follow in November from the National Theatre of Szeged in Hungary; this production will be televised live to more than 40 countries and streamed live across the web.

== Roles ==
Role	Voice type	Premiere cast, 5 March 1974 Conductor: Charles Rosekrans
Masha	soprano	Patricia Wells/Catherine Malfitano
Medvedenko	tenor	Michael Best
Constantine	baritone	Richard Stilwell/Robert Shiesley
Sorin	bass-baritone	David Rae Smith
Nina	mezzo-soprano or soprano	Frederica von Stade/Evelyn Petros (mezzo)
Irina Arkadina	soprano	Evelyn Lear/Dolores Strazicich
Boris Trigorin	baritone	John Reardon/Ronald Hedlund
Shamrayeff	bass baritone	Jon Enloe
Pauline	mezzo-soprano	Dana Krueger
Doctor Dorn	tenor	Jack Trussel
Director		Frank Corsaro
Set and costume designer		Allen Charles Klein

== Recording ==
The first, and only, complete commercial recording of the opera is based on the live performance of the work's New York City premiere at the Manhattan School of Music.

- Thomas Pasatieri: The Seagull – Keri Behan (Masha), Isai Jess Munoz (Medvedenko), Raymond Ayers (Constantine), Maxime Alvarez de Toledo (Sorin), Amy Shoremount-Obra (Nina), Amy Gough (Arkadina), Matthew Worth (Trigorin), Thomas Pertel (Shamrayeff), Sarah Kraus (Pauline), Alvaro Vallejo (Dr. Dorn); Manhattan School of Music Chorus and Orchestra, conductor David Gilbert. Albany Records TROY579-80

== Sources ==
- Davis, Peter G., "An Opera That Flies", New York Magazine, 6 January 2006. Review of the Manhattan School of Music performance. Retrieved 5 October 2007.
- Dyers, Richard, "Reunion: Thomas Pasatieri", Opera News, April 2007, vol 71, no. 10. Retrieved 5 October 2007.
- Midgette, Anne, "Finding the Musical Romance in a Chekhov Play", The New York Times, 14 December 2002. Review of the Manhattan School of Music performance. Retrieved 5 October 2007.
- Thomas Pasatieri official website. Retrieved 5 October 2007.
