= Frau Margot =

Opera by Thomas Pasatieri

- Opera by Thomas Pasatieri
- Librettist: Frank Corsaro
- Language: English
- Based on: Corsaro's Lyric Suite
- Premiere: June 2, 2007; Fort Worth Opera

Frau Margot is an opera in 3 acts by composer Thomas Pasatieri. The work uses an English language libretto by Frank Corsaro which is based on Corsaro's play Lyric Suite. The opera's premiere was presented by the Fort Worth Opera on June 2, 2007. Corsaro directed the production which used sets by Alison Nalder and costumes by Steven Bryant. A recording of this production was released on CD by Albany Records.

== Roles ==
Role	Voice type	Premiere Cast, June 2, 2007 (Conductor: – Joseph Illick)
Frau Margot, a former diva	soprano	Lauren Flanigan
Ted Steinert, a composer	baritone	Morgan Smith
Kara Sundstrom, Margot's companion	mezzo-soprano	Patricia Risley
Walter Engelmann, Margot's agent	tenor	Allan Glassman
Gert Osterland, a detective	bass-baritone	Daniel Okulitch
