= Jack Beeson =

20th century American opera composer

Jack Hamilton Beeson (July 15, 1921 – June 6, 2010) was an American composer. He was known particularly for his operas, the best known of which are Lizzie Borden, Hello Out There!, and The Sweet Bye and Bye.

== Early life ==
Born in Muncie, Indiana, Beeson began with music when he started piano lessons with Luella Weimer in 1928, but it was not until 1933 that he began to compose. He decided to become an "opera-composer" after being influenced by Metropolitan Opera radio broadcasts. From 1936 until 1939, he switched piano teachers and was with Percival Owen during this period of time. In 1938 he received certificates with first class honors in piano and theory from the Conservatory of Music at the University of Toronto, a very well earned accomplishment at the age of 21. From 1944 to 1945 he had private studies with Béla Bartók in New York City. At this time he was also associating with the Columbia University Opera Workshop and the opera productions of Columbia Theatre Associates. This led to the first performance of his music in New York City. Throughout 1946 and 1947 Beeson was adapting Paul Goodman's play and composing the music for Jonah as well as writing and performing the Fifth Sonata on piano. Beeson won the Prix de Rome, and a Fulbright scholarship allowed him to live in Rome from 1948 to 1950.

== Career ==
During this time, he completed Jonah and then returned to teaching and opera productions at Columbia. The year of 1953/1954, he adapted Saroyan's play as a libretto and composed Hello Out There as well as superintending its first performance. From 1955 to 1958 he collaborated with Kenward Elmslie on The Sweet Bye and Bye, first performed at the Juilliard School. From 1958 to 1959 he wrote three orchestral works and numerous smaller pieces. During 1965 and 1967 he recorded and published Lizzie Borden, which was televised by NET Opera and revived by the New York City Opera. That same year, he also became MacDowell Professor of Music at Columbia. From 1981 to 1991 he wrote Cyrano, a heroic comedy in music, with Sheldon Harnick. He then chose early retirement from Columbia in 1988, but returned as a member of the Society of Senior Scholars. In May 2010, he was awarded a Letter of Distinction from the American Music Center.

His notable students include Charles Wuorinen, John Kander, Phillip Ramey, Alice Shields, Joan Tower, Harvey Sollberger, Michael Rosenzweig, Bright Sheng, Mark Birnbaum, and Richard Einhorn. Beeson died on June 6, 2010, in New York City, New York.

== Works ==
=== Operas ===
- Captain Jinks of the Horse Marines (1975), a romantic comedy in music in three acts. Libretto by Sheldon Harnick, based on the play by Clyde Fitch. Commissioned by the National Endowment for the Arts. ca. 120'. Boosey & Hawkes.
- Cyrano (1990), Heroic comedy in music. Libretto by Sheldon Harnick, based on the play by Edmond Rostand. ca. 160'. Boosey & Hawkes.
- Doctor Heidegger's Fountain of Youth (1978), Chamber opera in one act. Libretto by Sheldon Harnick, based on the short story by Nathaniel Hawthorne. Commissioned by the National Arts Club. ca. 40'. Boosey & Hawkes.
- Hello Out There (1953), Chamber opera in one act. Libretto adapted from the play by William Saroyan. ca. 40'. Boosey & Hawkes.
- Jonah (1948–50), Opera in two or three acts to be played, danced, and sung. Libretto by the composer, adapted from the play by Paul Goodman. ca. 115'. Boosey & Hawkes.
- Lizzie Borden (1965), a Family Portrait in three acts. Libretto by Kenward Elmslie, based on a scenario by Richard Plant. Commissioned by the Ford Foundation. ca. 120'. Boosey & Hawkes.
- My Heart's in the Highlands (1969), Chamber opera in two or three acts. Libretto by the composer, adapted from the play by William Saroyan. Commissioned by the National Educational Television Opera Theater. ca. 105'. Boosey & Hawkes.
- Sorry, Wrong Number (1996). Boosey & Hawkes.
- The Sweet Bye and Bye (1956; rev. 1958), Opera in two acts (five scenes). Libretto by Kenward Elmslie. ca. 110'. Boosey & Hawkes.

=== Orchestral ===
- Fanfare (1963) for brass, winds, and percussion. Commissioned by the Kirkwood Symphony. 2'. Manuscript.
- Hymns and Dances (from The Sweet Bye and Bye) (1958) for large orchestra. 15'. Boosey & Hawkes.
- Symphony No.1 in A (1959) for orchestra. 20'. Boosey & Hawkes.
- Transformations (1959) for large orchestra. 10'. Boosey & Hawkes.
- Two Concert Arias (1952/53) for soprano and orchestra, or piano. Manuscript.
1. The Elephant (1953) Text: D.H. Lawrence. 4.
2. The Hippopotamus (1952) Text: T.S. Eliot. 5.
- Two Pieces (1967) for film, radio or television. Winds, brass, and percussion. 3'. Boosey & Hawkes.

=== Concert band ===
- Commemoration (1960) for band and optional unison chorus. Text: Columbia College Alma Mater. Commissioned by Columbia College. 5–6'. Boosey & Hawkes.
- Hymns and Dances (from The Sweet Bye and Bye) (arr. 1966). 15'. Boosey & Hawkes.

=== Solo and chamber works ===
- Fantasy, Ditty, and Fughettas (1992) for two baroque (or modern) flutes. C.F. Peters.
- Fifth Piano Sonata (1946; rev. 1951). 14'. Theodore Presser.
- Fourth Piano Sonata (1945; rev. 1951). 9'. Theodore Presser.
- Interlude (1945; rev. 1951) for violin and piano. 3½'. Manuscript.
- Old Hundredth: Prelude and Doxology (1972) for organ. 3½'. Boosey & Hawkes.
- Round and Round (1959), Easy duets for piano, four hands. Oxford University Press.
- Sketches in Black and White (1958) for piano. 10'. Manuscript.
- Sonata Canonica (1966) for two alto recorders. 5½'. Galaxy Music Corp.
- Sonata (1953) for viola and piano. 15'. Theodore Presser.
- Song (1945) for flute and piano. 2'. Shawnee Press.
- Two Diversions (1944; rev. 1953) for piano. 7'. Charles Scribner's Sons: Music Library (vol.4)

=== Vocal works ===
- Abbie's Bird Song (1965; rev. 1967) for high voice and piano. Revision of an aria from Lizzie Borden. Text: Kenward Elmslie. 3'. Boosey & Hawkes
- Against Idleness and Mischief and In Praise of Labor (1959), a practice session for high voice and piano. Text: Isaac Watts. 3'. Boosey & Hawkes.
- Aria in Praise of Sopranos (1992) for tenor and piano. From Captain Jinks of the Horse Marines. Boosey & Hawkes.
- Big Crash Out West (1951) for baritone and piano. Text: Peter Viereck. 2'. Galaxy Music Corp. or Boosey & Hawkes.
- Cat! (1979) for soprano and piano. 3'. Text: John Keats. Boosey & Hawkes.
- Cowboy Song (1979) for baritone and piano. Text: Charles Causley. 4'. Galaxy Music Corp. or Boosey & Hawkes.
- A Creole Mystery (1970) for mezzo-soprano or baritone and string quartet. Text: Lafcadio Hearn, adapted by the composer. 9–10'. Boosey & Hawkes.
- The Day's No Rounder Than Its Angles Are (1971) for mezzo-soprano or baritone and string quartet. Text: Peter Viereck. 12'. Boosey & Hawkes.
- Death by Owl-Eyes (1971) for high voice and piano. Text: Richard Hughes. 2½'. Boosey & Hawkes.
- Eldorado (1951) for high voice and piano. Text: Edgar Allan Poe. 2'. Galaxy Music Corp.
- Fire, Fire, Quench Desire (1959) for high voice and piano. Text: George Peele. 2½'. Boosey & Hawkes.
- Five Songs (1946; rev. 1950) for soprano and piano. Text: Francis Quarles. 8'. Peer International Corp.
- Four Crazy Jane Songs (1992) for mezzo (or mezzo-contralto) and piano. (See "Lullaby" and "Three Love Songs", 1951). Boosey & Hawkes.
- From a Watchtower (1976), five songs for high or middle voice and piano. Texts: William Wordsworth, W.H. Auden, Gerard Manley Hopkins, and Walter de la Mare. 16'. Boosey & Hawkes.
- The Gambler's Song (1953) for baritone and piano. Revision of an aria from Hello Out There. Text: William Saroyan, adapted by the composer. 3'. Boosey & Hawkes.
- Hide and Seek (an Easter ballad) (1991) for tenor and piano. Text: Peter Viereck. 3'. In preparation.
- Indiana Homecoming (1956) for baritone and piano. Text: Abraham Lincoln. 2½'. Boosey & Hawkes.
- In the Public Gardens (1991) for tenor and piano. Text: John Betjeman. 3'. In preparation.
- Killing Time (1992) for mezzo and piano. From Lizzie Borden. Boosey & Hawkes.
- Leda (1957) for reciting voice and piano. Text: Aldous Huxley. 20'. Manuscript.
- Love Song, Arietta and Aria (1992) for tenor and piano. From The Sweet Bye and Bye. Boosey & Hawkes.
- Lullaby (1944; rev. 1959) for alto and piano. Text: William Butler Yeats. 3'. Manuscript.
- Margret's Garden Aria (1965; rev. 1967) for high voice and piano. Revision of an aria from Lizzie Borden. Text: the composer. 3½'. Boosey & Hawkes.
- Mary Magdalen's Song (1991) for mezzo-soprano and piano. Text: Peter Viereck. 4'. In preparation.
- Mother Rainey's Aria: The Wages of Sin and Reprise: To the Seducer (1992) for mezzo and piano. From The Sweet Bye and Bye. Boosey & Hawkes.
- Nine Songs and Arias for Baritone. See under individual titles for details. Boosey & Hawkes.
1. Big Crash Out West
2. Calvinistic Evensong (see Two Songs)
3. Cowboy Song
4. The Gambler's Song from Hello Out There
5. Indiana Homecoming
6. Prescription for Living from Doctor Heidegger's Fountain of Youth
7. Senex (see Two Songs)
8. To a Sinister Potato
9. Wedding Song, from Captain Jinks of the Horse Marines
- Nine Songs and Arias for Soprano. See under individual titles for details. Boosey & Hawkes.
1. Abbie's Bird Song from Lizzie Borden
2. Against Idleness and Mischief and In Praise of Labor
3. Cat!
4. Death by Owl-Eyes
5. Fire, Fire, Quench Desire
6. Margret's Garden Aria from Lizzie Borden
7. To Violetta Valery from Captain Jinks of the Horse Marines
8. The Widow's Waltz from Doctor Heidegger's Fountain of Youth
9. The You Should of Done It Blues
- Piazza Piece (1951; rev. 1988), duet for soprano and tenor with piano. Text: John Crowe Ransom. 4½'. Manuscript.
- Prescription for Living (1978; rev. 1990) for bass-baritone and piano. An aria from Doctor Heidegger's Fountain of Youth. Text: Sheldon Harnick. 4¼'. Boosey & Hawkes.
- Pull My Daisy (1997) for high voice and piano. Boosey & Hawkes.
- Six Lyrics for high voice and piano. Texts: Thomas Lovell Beddoes (2), Herman Melville, Percy Bysshe Shelley, Jasper Mayne, Sir Walter Raleigh. 12'. Manuscript.
- The Spinster's Anguish (1992) for mezzo and piano. From Dr. Heidegger's Fountain of Youth. Boosey & Hawkes.
- A Tale Told by Mary's Lamb (1991) for tenor and piano. Text: Peter Viereck. 4'. In preparation.
- Three Blake Songs (1992) for tenor and piano. See "Three Songs 1951". Boosey & Hawkes.
- Three Love Songs (1944; rev. 1959) for alto and piano. Text: William Butler Yeats. 5'. Manuscript.
- Three Songs (1945; rev. 1951) for soprano and piano. Text: William Blake. 4'. Manuscript.
- To a Sinister Potato (1970) for baritone and piano. Text: Peter Viereck. 3½'. Boosey & Hawkes.
- To Violetta Valery (1975) for soprano and piano. An aria from Captain Jinks of the Horse Marines. Text: Sheldon Harnick. 2'. Boosey & Hawkes.
- Two Cavatinas (1992) for tenor and piano. From Captain Jinks of the Horse Marines. Boosey & Hawkes.
- Two Concert Arias (1951/53) for soprano and piano. Manuscript.
1. The Elephant (1953) Text: D.H. Lawrence. 3½'.
2. The Hippopotamus (1951) Text: T.S. Eliot. 4½'.
- Two Millay Sonnets (1992) for mezzo and piano. Boosey & Hawkes.
- Two Songs (1952) for baritone and piano. Text: John Betjeman. 5½'. Boosey & Hawkes.
- Wedding Song (1975) for baritone and piano. An aria from Captain Jinks of the Horse Marines. Text: Sheldon Harnick. 2'. Boosey & Hawkes.
- The Widow's Waltz (1978; rev. 1983) for high voice and piano. Revision of an aria from Doctor Heidegger's Fountain of Youth. Text: Sheldon Harnick. 2½'. Boosey & Hawkes.
- The You Should of Done It Blues (1971) for soprano and piano. Text: Peter Viereck. 2½'. Boosey & Hawkes.
