= Thomas Pasatieri =

American opera composer (born 1945)

Thomas Pasatieri (born October 20, 1945) is an American opera composer.

== Life and career ==
Pasatieri was born in New York City, United States. He began composing at age 10 and, as a teenager, studied with Nadia Boulanger, although his main teachers were Vittorio Giannini and Vincent Persichetti. He entered the Juilliard School at age 16 and eventually became the school's first recipient of a doctoral degree.

Pasatieri has taught composition at the Juilliard School, the Manhattan School of Music, and the Cincinnati College-Conservatory of Music. From 1980 through 1984, he held the post of artistic director at Atlanta Opera.

He has composed 24 operas, the best known of which is The Seagull, composed in 1972. Two of his operas were premiered in 2007: Frau Margot by the Fort Worth Opera and The Hotel Casablanca in San Francisco. Other popular operas include La Divina and Signor Deluso.

In 1984, Pasatieri moved to Los Angeles, California, where he formed his film music production company, Topaz Productions. His film orchestrations can be heard in Billy Bathgate, Road to Perdition, American Beauty, The Little Mermaid, The Shawshank Redemption, Fried Green Tomatoes, Legends of the Fall, Thomas Newman's Angels in America and Scent of a Woman, among many others. In 2003, Pasatieri returned to New York to continue his concert and opera career.

== Works ==
=== Operas ===
- The Trysting Place, opera in one act; libretto by the composer (1964, unperformed)
- Flowers of Ice, opera in one act; libretto by the composer (1964, unperformed)
- The Women, opera in one act; libretto by the composer (20 August 1965; Aspen, CO)
- La Divina, opera in one act; libretto by the composer (16 March 1966; New York)
- Padrevia, opera in one act; libretto by the composer after Boccaccio (18 November 1967; Brooklyn, NY)
- Calvary, opera in one act; setting of the play by W. B. Yeats (April 1971; Bellevue, WA)
- The Trial of Mary Lincoln, opera in one act; libretto by A. H. Bailey (14 Feb. 1972; National Educational Television)
- Black Widow, opera in three acts; libretto by the composer after Dos madres by Miguel de Unamuno (2 March 1972; Seattle Opera)
- The Seagull, opera in three acts; libretto by K. Elmslie after the play by Anton Chekov (5 March 1974; Houston Grand Opera)
- Signor Deluso, opera in one act; libretto by the composer after Sganarelle by Molière (27 July 1974; Vienna, VA)
- The Penitentes, opera in three acts; libretto by A. H. Bailey (3 August 1974; Aspen, CO)
- Inés de Castro, opera in three acts; libretto by B. Stambler (1 April 1976; Baltimore, Baltimore Opera)
- Washington Square, opera in two acts; libretto by K. Elmslie after Henry James (1 October 1976, Detroit, Michigan Opera Theatre)
- Before Breakfast, opera in one act; libretto by Frank Corsaro, based on the play by Eugene O'Neill, Revised 2006. (9 October 1980, New York City Opera)
- The Goose Girl, a children's opera in one act; libretto by the composer, based on a story by J. L. and W. C. Grimm (15 February 1981, Fort Worth, Texas)
- Maria Elena, an opera in one act; libretto by the composer based on a true story (6 April 1983, University of Arizona)
- Three Sisters, opera in 2 acts; libretto by Kenward Elmslie based on Anton Chekhov's play, Three Sisters (13 March 1986, Columbus, Opera Columbus)
- Frau Margot, opera in three acts; libretto by Frank Corsaro, based on his original play Lyric Suite (2 June 2007, Fort Worth, Fort Worth Opera)
- The Hotel Casablanca, opera in two acts; original libretto by the composer based on Georges Feydeau's play, A Flea in Her Ear. (3 August 2007, San Francisco, San Francisco Opera Merola Program)
- The Heir Apparent (2008)
- The Family Room, libretto by Daphne Malfitano (2009)
- God Bless Us Everyone (after A Christmas Carol), an opera for Christmas (2010)
- The Martyrs, libretto by Daphne Malfitano, an opera in two acts for two singers and piano solo (2011)
- The Vaudevillian (2015) Opera in two acts; libretto by the composer.

=== Orchestral ===
- Invocation (1968)
- Symphony No. 1
- Symphony No. 2
- Symphony No. 3

=== Concertante ===
- Serenade for violin and chamber orchestra (also an alternate version for violin and piano) (1992)
- Concerto for piano and orchestra (1993)
- Concerto for 2 pianos and strings (1994)
- Concerto for harpsichord and chamber orchestra (2007)
- Concerto for viola and orchestra (2012)

=== Instrumental and chamber music ===
- Piano Sonata No. 1 (1966)
- Piano Sonata No. 2 (1969)
- Piano Sonata No. 3 (1993)
- Cameos for solo piano (1969)
- Theatrepieces for clarinet, violin and piano (1987)
- Quartet for flute and strings (1995)
- Sonata for viola and piano (1995)
- Sonata for flute and piano (1997)
- Piano Sonata No. 3 (1997)
- Rhapsody for trombone and piano (2006)
- Manifesto for unaccompanied viola (2012)

=== Vocal music ===
==== Choral ====
- Permit Me Voyage (James Agee) (1976)
- Mass (1983)
- A Joyful Noise (1985) (The Bible)
- Three Mysteries (Walt Whitman, G. Meredith, P. Sidney) (1991)
- The Harvest Frost (Carl Sandburg) (1993)
- Bang the Drum Loudly (Thomas Pasatieri) (1994)
- Canticle of Praise (1995)
- Mornings Innocent (May Swenson, Bill Wright, Adrienne Rich) (1995)
- In the light of angels (2013) Children's chorus, solo soprano, mezzo, baroque orchestra

==== Voice and chamber ensemble ====
- Heloïse And Abelard (Louis Phillips) (1973)
- Far From Love (Emily Dickinson) (1976)
- Canciones del barrio (Voice and string quartet, 1993)
- Letter to Warsaw (Pola Braun) (2003)

==== Voice and orchestra ====
- Rites Of Passage (Louis Phillips) (1974)
- Voice and chamber orchestra or string quartet
- Sieben Lehmannlieder (Lotte Lehmann) (1988)
- Alleluia (1991)

==== Voice and piano ====
- Day of Love (Kirstin van Cleave) (1983)
- Three Sonnets from the Portuguese (Elizabeth Barrett Browning) (1984)
- Sieben Lehmannlieder (Lotte Lehmann) (1988)
- Windsongs (1989)

- Three Poems of Theodore Ramsay

1.Love
2.Remembering
3.On Parting

- Vocalise
- Three California Songs (Robert H. Deutsch)

1.Brother
2.Song
3.The Middle-Aged Shepherd

- Windsong (Richard Nickson)

- Alleluia (1991)
- Three Poems of Oscar Wilde (1998)
- A Rustling of Angels (2003)
- Letter to Warsaw (Pola Braun) (2003)
- The Daughter of Capulet (monodrama) (2007)
- Lady Macbeth (monodrama) (2007)
- The Bride of the Moor (monodrama)
- Three Songs of Kirsten Van Cleave
- The Last Invocation (Walt Whitman)
- Orpheus (William Shakespeare)
- Dream Land (Christina Rossetti)
- Three Poems of James Agee
- Ophelia's Lament (William Shakespeare)
- Vocal Modesty (Gerald Walker)
- Overweight, Overwrought Over You (Sheila Nadler)
- Divas of a Certain Age (Thomas Pasatieri)
- Bel Canto Songs (William Blake)
- Duets
