= Anna Karenina (Carlson) =

Carlson opera by David Carlson

Anna Karenina is an opera in two acts by American composer David Carlson, based on the 1877 novel Anna Karenina by Leo Tolstoy, commissioned by Florida Grand Opera to celebrate the 2007 opening of the Ziff Ballet Opera House at the Adrienne Arsht Center for the Performing Arts, co-commissioned by Opera Theatre of Saint Louis. The libretto is by British director Colin Graham, originally contemplated for Benjamin Britten's opera commissioned by the Bolshoi Theatre (the project was cancelled by the British after the Warsaw Pact invasion of Czechoslovakia). Graham was to have directed the original production; after his death only weeks before the opera's opening night, the direction was taken over by Mark Streshinsky. The opera is in two acts with a prologue and an epilogue, lasting just over two hours.

The composer added a new scene to the score for the West Coast premiere at the Opera San José in 2010.

== Orchestration ==
The opera exists in two orchestral versions. The original calls for piccolo, 2 flutes, 2 oboes (both doubling English horn), 2 clarinets, 2 bassoons (#2 doubling on contrabassoon), 4 horns, 3 trumpets, 3 trombones, tuba, timpani, three percussionists, harp, celesta, and strings, with off-stage and recorded sounds.

The new version, created for Opera San José in California, re-scored by conductor Bryan Nies, is scored for 2 flutes (#2 doubling on piccolo), 2 oboes, 2 clarinets, 2 bassoons, 4 horns, 2 trumpets, 2 trombones, two percussionists, harp, synthesizer/celesta, and strings.

== Recordings ==
The opera was recorded during the performances by Opera Theatre of Saint Louis, with the Saint Louis Symphony Orchestra performing, led by Stewart Robertson, and was released on the Signum Classics label.

== Performance history and roles ==
Role	Voice type	Florida Grand Opera April 2007	Opera Theatre of Saint Louis June 2007	Opera San José September 2010
Conductor		Stewart Robertson	Stewart Robertson	Stewart Robertson & Bryan Nies
Stage director		Colin Graham & Mark Streshinsky	Colin Graham & Mark Streshinsky	Brad Dalton
Set designer		Neil Patel	Neil Patel	Steven C. Kemp
Costume designer		Robert Perdziola	Robert Perdziola	Elizabeth Poindexter
Lighting designer		Mark McCullough	Mark McCullough	Kent Dorsey
Anna Karenina	soprano	Kelly Kaduce	Kelly Kaduce	Jasmina Halimic & Jouvanca Jean-Baptiste
Alexei Karenin	bass-baritone	Christian Van Horn	Christian van Horn	Kirk Eichelberger & Isaiah Musik-Ayala
Alexei Vronsky	baritone	Robert Gierlach	Robert Gierlach	Krassen Karagiozov & Torlef Borsting
Kitty	soprano	Sarah Coburn	Sarah Coburn	Khori Dastoor
Levin	tenor	Brandon Jovanovich	Brandon Jovanovich	Michael Dailey & Alexander Boyer
Dolly	mezzo-soprano	Christine Abraham	Christine Abraham	Betany Coffland & Tori Grayum
Agafia	mezzo-soprano	Rosalind Elias	Rosalind Elias	Heather McFadden
Lydia	mezzo-soprano	Dorothy Byrne	Dorothy Byrne	Kindra Scharich
Stiva	tenor	William Joyner	William Joyner	Christopher Bengochea & Michael Mendelsohn
Betsy	mezzo-soprano	Josepha Gayer	Josepha Gayer	Megan Stetson
Prince Yashvin	baritone	Corey Crider	Nicolas Pallesen	Paul Murray

- Various spoken roles

The opera is published by Carl Fischer Music, New York.
