= Christine Abraham =

American mezzo-soprano singer (born 1964)

- Born: Christine A. Abraham; February 22, 1964 (age 62); Temple City, California, US
- Origin: United States
- Genre: Opera

Christine A. Abraham (born February 22, 1964) is an American mezzo-soprano and voice teacher. She had an active performance career in operas and concerts from the late 1980s through the 2000s. She created roles in the world premieres of several operas; including David Carlson's The Midnight Angel (1993), Stephen Paulus's The Woman at Otowi Crossing (1995), Peter Lieberson's Ashoka's Dream (1997), Stephen Hartke's The Greater Good, or the Passion of Boule de Suif (2006), and Carlson's Anna Karenina (2007). Since 2010 her career has shifted towards teaching singing. She currently teaches at the San Francisco Conservatory of Music and California State University.

== Early life and education ==
Abraham was born on February 22, 1964, in Temple City, California, the daughter of Wayne and Alice Abraham. Raised in Palo Alto, California, she graduated from Gunn High School. She studied at the San Francisco Conservatory of Music (SFCM) where she gave her senior year recital in March 1987. She was a soloist in the SFCM's performance of Handel's Messiah at Davies Symphony Hall in December 1986. In January 1987, she performed Elam Sprenkle's Six Songs for Mezzo-Soprano and Brass Quintet with the New Albion Brass.

Abraham pursued further studies at the Music Academy of the West in Los Angeles where she sang in a concert honoring Lotte Lehmann in August 1988. Sometime before this she spent a summer studying at the American Institute of Musical Studies in Graz where she met the flautist Trygve Peterson. They married on December 30, 1988. She entered the graduate music program at the Manhattan School of Music (MSM) where she studied voice with Patricia McCaffrey and Cynthia Hoffmann. She graduated with a master of music in vocal performance. While at the MSM she performed the role of Christoph Rilke in the United States premiere of Siegfried Matthus's Die Weise von Liebe und Tod des Cornets Christoph Rilke in December 1990. In 1992 she participated in a masterclass open to the public given by Hermann Prey at the 92nd Street Y.

== Career ==
In 1988, Abraham was a soloist in a concert of music by Joseph Haydn with Florilegium Chamber Choir at Merkin Concert Hall. In April 1990, she performed in Jerome Kern's The Cat and the Fiddle at Weill Recital Hall. In 1991 and 1992, she was a member of the young artist program at the Santa Fe Opera where she appeared as a peasant girl in The Marriage of Figaro . She portrayed the Mother in Amahl and the Night Visitors (1992) and Dorabella in Mozart's Così fan tutte (1993) with the Orlando Opera Company. In 1992, she performed as a soloist in three cantatas by Johann Sebastian Bach with the Berkshire Bach Society and the St. Cecilia Orchestra: Bleib bei uns, denn es will Abend werden, BWV 6, Liebster Gott, wenn werd ich sterben, BWV 8, and Jesu, der du meine Seele, BWV 78.

In 1993, Abraham portrayed the role of Death / Angeline in the world premiere of David Carlson's opera The Midnight Angel at the Opera Theatre of Saint Louis (OTSL). She repeated this role soon after at the Glimmerglass Opera and the Sacramento Opera. In 1994, she performed the role of Susanna in Le nozze di Figaro at the Tulsa Opera with Richard Paul Fink as Figaro. That same year she appeared with Lyric Opera Cleveland as the Lady with a Hat Box in Postcard from Morocco. In 1995, she portrayed the role of the Page in Richard Strauss's Salome with the Utah Opera, and created the role of Emily in the world premiere of Stephen Paulus's The Woman at Otowi Crossing at the OTSL.

In 1996, Abraham portrayed Queen Mab in Sarasota Opera's production of La jolie fille de Perth, Miss Jessel in Benjamin Britten's The Turn of the Screw at the New York City Opera (NYCO), and returned to Glimmerglass Opera as Diana in Francesco Cavalli's La Calisto. In 1997, she portrayed Sheherazada in Tan Dun's Marco Polo at the NYCO, and performed the role of the Third Element in the world premiere of Peter Lieberson's Ashoka's Dream at the Santa Fe Opera. That same year she performed as a soloist in a truncated performance of Bach's Christmas Oratorio with the Phoenix Symphony Orchestra, and in Joseph Haydn's Harmoniemesse with the Saint Louis Symphony. In 1998, she portrayed the Muse in The Tales of Hoffmann at both the NYCO and the Opera Company of Philadelphia.

In May 1998, Abraham was a soloist in Bach's Mass in B minor given for the centennial festival of the Bach Choir of Bethlehem. She subsequently was a soloist in the St John Passion at the 1999 Bethlehem Bach Festival. In July 1999 she appeared again at Glimmerglass as Minerva in Il ritorno d'Ulisse in patria. In 2000 she portrayed the title roles in Rossini's La Cenerentola with the Santa Barbara Grand Opera, Valencienne in The Merry Widow with Utah Opera, and the title part in Jacopo Peri's Euridice with the Long Beach Opera. That same year she was a soloist in Prokofiev's Alexander Nevsky with the Phoenix Symphony, Mozart's Great Mass in C minor, K. 427 with the Vermont Symphony Orchestra, and in Bach's St. Matthew Passion at the Baldwin-Wallace College Bach Festival (BWCBF). She later returned to BWCBF as a soloist in the St John Passion in 2002 again in the St. Matthew Passion in 2004 and 2008, and the Mass in B minor in 2005.

In 2001, Abraham returned to Glimmerglass as Lazuli in L'étoile, and portrayed Katarina in Tod Machover's Resurrection with the Boston Lyric Opera. In 2002 she performed a concert of Mozart arias with the Philadelphia Orchestra. She portrayed Ida in Die Fledermaus at the Metropolitan Opera during its 2002–2003 season.

In 2003, Abraham portrayed Cherubino in The Marriage of Figaro with Opera Grand Rapids, Despina in Così fan tutte with the Toledo Opera, Bradamante in Alcina with Boston Baroque, and Mila in Leoš Janáček's Osud at the Bard Music Festival with the American Symphony Orchestra led by Leon Botstein. In 2004, she portrayed Blanche in Dialogues of the Carmelites with the Palm Beach Opera, and Sesto in Giulio Cesare with the Utah Opera. She performed the role of Mme. Carre-Lamadon in the world premiere of Stephen Hartke's The Greater Good, or the Passion of Boule de Suif at Glimmerglass in 2006. In 2007, she created the role of Dolly in the world premiere of David Carlson's Anna Karenina with the Florida Grand Opera. In 2008, she performed the role of Rosina in The Barber of Seville at the Hawaii Opera Theatre. While an Adler Fellow at the San Francisco Opera, she performed music composed for the Final Fantasy video games by Nobuo Uematsu with the San Francisco Symphony in 2009.

Abraham works as a voice teaches at the San Francisco Conservatory of Music, California State University East Bay, and privately in San Leandro, California.
