= Dorothy Byrne (mezzo-soprano) =

American operatic mezzo-soprano

Dorothy Byrne is an American operatic mezzo-soprano. She has performed leading and comprimario roles at several opera houses in the United States, including the Metropolitan Opera, the Lyric Opera of Chicago, the Chicago Opera Theater, the Boston Lyric Opera, the Des Moines Metro Opera, the Hawaii Opera Theatre, the Kentucky Opera, the Minnesota Opera, and the Opera Theatre of Saint Louis among others. She portrayed the role of Rosalind in the Glimmerglass Opera's 2005 production of Richard Rodney Bennett's The Mines of Sulphur and participated in the company's recording which was nominated for a Grammy Award for Best Opera Recording. She returned to Glimmerglass in 2006 to portray Mme. Follenvie in the world premiere of Stephen Hartke's The Greater Good, or the Passion of Boule de Suif. In 2007 she performed the role of Lydia in the premiere of David Carlson's Anna Karenina at the Florida Grand Opera.
