= Christian Van Horn =

American opera singer

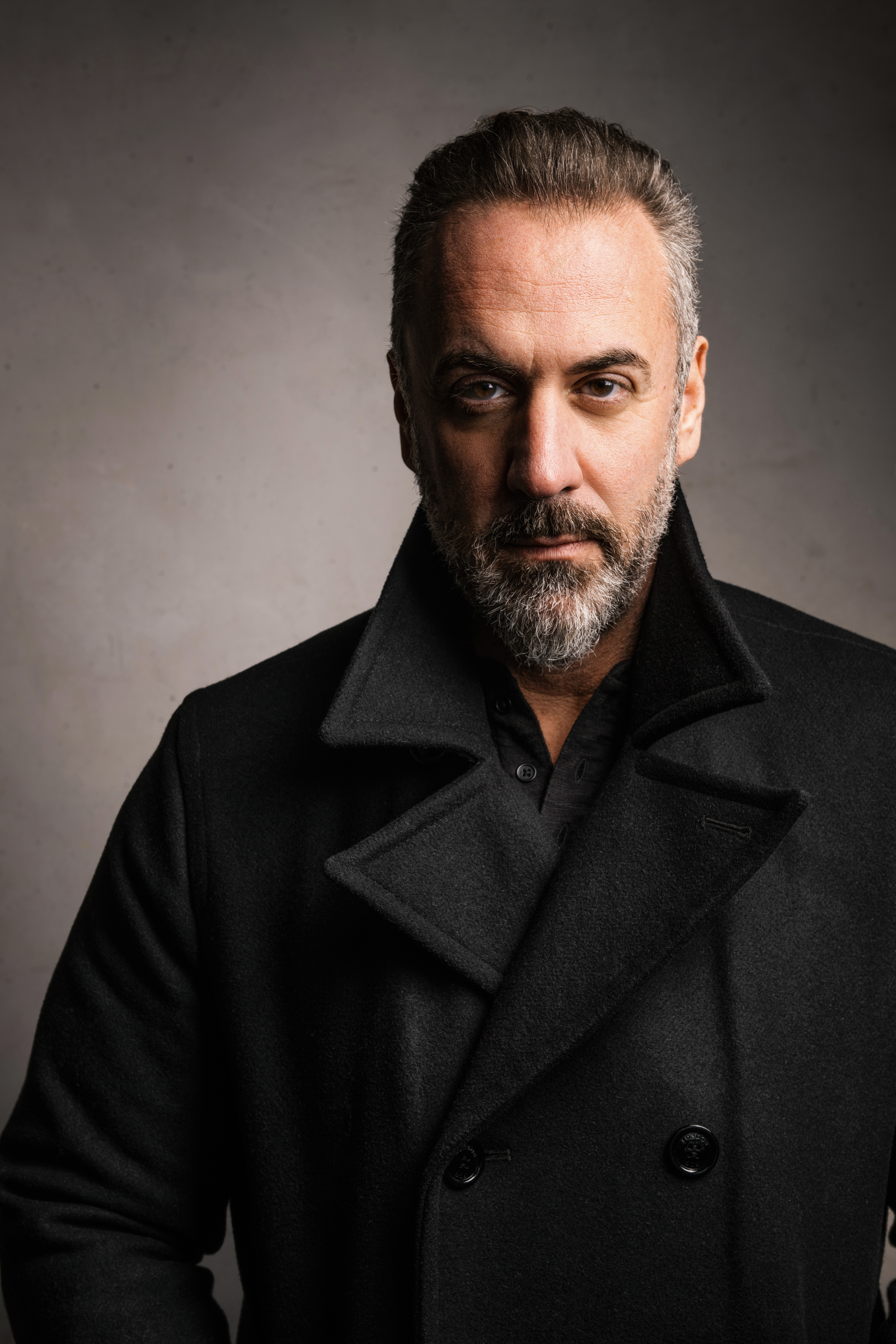
Christian Van Horn in 2026

Christian Van Horn is an American bass-baritone.

== Personal life ==
Van Horn was born on 31 October 1978 in Rockville Centre, New York. He lives in Virginia with his wife and son.

== Education ==
Van Horn has degrees in music from the State University of New York at Stony Brook and Yale School of Music.

== Career ==
Van Horn won the Metropolitan Opera National Council Auditions in 2003 and made his debut on the operatic stage in 2004 at the Florida Grand Opera, where he sang Lu Duc in Gounod's Roméo et Juliette.

He made his debut at the Lyric Opera of Chicago later that season, where he was a member of The Patrick G. and Shirley W. Ryan Opera Center Ensemble. In 2007 he sang the American premiere of Tan Dun's Tea at Santa Fe Opera and the world premiere of David Carlson's Anna Karenina at Florida Grand Opera.

His international debut was in Roméo et Juliette at the 2008 Salzburg Festival. He stayed in Europe from 2008 until 2010, where he had a contract with the Bavarian State Opera. He made his Canadian Opera Company debut as Angelotti in Puccini's Tosca in 2012 and his Metropolitan Opera debut as Pistola in Verdi's Falstaff in 2013.

In 2015 he performed the World premiere of Marco Tutino's Two Women at San Francisco Opera and in 2017 the American premiere of Thomas Adès's The Exterminating Angel at the Metropolitan Opera.

He was the 2018 winner of Richard Tucker Award. That same year he performed the title role of Boito's Mefistofele at the Metropolitan Opera. His debut at the Opéra National de Paris took place in 2019, as Narbal in Berlioz's Les Troyens. He toured with the Metropolitan Opera Orchestra in Asia in 2024, performing the title role of Bartók's Bluebeard's Castle at Lotte Concert Hall in Seoul.

He makes his role debut as Philippe II in Verdi’s Don Carlos at the Opéra National de Paris, and as the title role in Verdi's Attila at Teatro Real de Madrid in 2025

In July 2025 he made his house debut at the Royal Opera House in Covent Garden as Escamillo in Carmen.
