= John Keyes =

John Keyes may refer to:

- John Keyes (tenor), American operatic tenor
- John Keyes (soldier) (1745–1824), Adjutant General of the State of Connecticut
- John T. D. Keyes (born 1954), Canadian journalist and editor
