= Florida Philharmonic Orchestra =

Disbanded American symphony orchestra

- symphony orchestra
- Former name: Philharmonic Orchestra of Florida (1985–1990)
- Founded: 1985 (41 years ago)
- Disbanded: 2003 (23 years ago)
- Location: Ft. Lauderdale, Florida, U.S. (administration)
- Concert hall: multiple (see Florida Philharmonic Orchestra#Venues)
- Music director: James Judd (during most of the orchestra's existence)

The Florida Philharmonic Orchestra (or FPO, founded in 1985 as the Philharmonic Orchestra of Florida) was a symphony orchestra, based in Fort Lauderdale, Florida, United States, and serving the South Florida metropolitan area (including Miami-Dade, Broward, and Palm Beach counties). With approximately eighty full-time, tenured musicians, the orchestra was led for most of its existence by British conductor and music director James Judd. The orchestra disbanded after extensive financial problems, performing its last concert in Boca Raton, Florida, on May 9, 2003.

== History and operations ==
The Philharmonic Orchestra of Florida ("POOF") was formed through a merger of two smaller South Florida orchestras, the Fort Lauderdale Symphony Orchestra and the Boca Raton Symphony Orchestra. Though the orchestra was officially founded on February 15, 1985, the merger had existed on a "de facto basis" since August 1984. The new orchestra filled an artistic void in the South Florida area left after the collapse of the Miami Philharmonic Orchestra in 1982.

Over the course of the philharmonic's entire history, the orchestra (at its peak the largest performing-arts organization in Florida, and the 20th-largest orchestra in the U.S.) rehearsed in a tiny rehearsal hall, dubbed Philharmonic Hall, that was situated on North Federal Highway in Fort Lauderdale just south of Sunrise Boulevard, and which had also been the home of the Fort Lauderdale Symphony. This acoustically dreadful room would be the sole venue for philharmonic rehearsals and would host scores of internationally renowned soloists and conductors. Initial performance venues included Fort Lauderdale's War Memorial Auditorium.

In addition to its Tri-County subscription concerts, the philharmonic continued the Fort Lauderdale Symphony's decades-old legacy serving as the resident pit orchestra of the Florida Grand Opera, a relationship that remained intact until 2000 and which was a major source of operating revenue. In addition, the orchestra also consistently performed Tri-County educational concerts throughout its existence, providing hundreds of thousands of South Florida schoolchildren with access to learning about classical music with a world-class symphony orchestra.

=== Early years ===
Emerson Buckley, the music director of the Fort Lauderdale orchestra since 1963, continued as music director of the new orchestra until stepping down from the podium in 1986. At this early period in the orchestra's existence, the orchestra began seeking to compete on a national level for musicians and prestige, hiring British conductor James Judd as music director in May 1987 after his frequent guest appearances with the orchestra. At the beginning of his tenure, Judd expressed optimism for the future of classical music in South Florida.

=== The 1990s ===
In December 1990, the orchestra changed its name to the Florida Philharmonic Orchestra.

The Florida Philharmonic made several critically acclaimed recordings, including Gustav Mahler's Symphony No. 1 (recording dates Sep. 13 & 15, 1993). The album, released in August 1994, was declared the best Mahler recording of the year by the Gustav Mahler Society, as well as Recording of the Month for August 1994 by Stereophile, who declared it to be "one of the best orchestral recordings of the digital era."

From 1991 to 2000, the orchestra engaged pianist Peter Nero to form a pops series Peter Nero and Pops at the philharmonic.

The orchestra continued to grow in size, quality and prestige throughout the 1990s under the direction of Judd, who shared an amicable relationship with the musicians through much of his tenure. Audience sizes grew significantly, and international tours were discussed. However, nagging financial struggles combined with disputes between the musicians and management led to increasing discord which culminated in a strike in the autumn of 2000.

In the late 1990s Judd announced that the Florida Philharmonic would be leaving its principal home in Fort Lauderdale and establishing itself as the resident ensemble of a soon-to-be-built performing-arts center in downtown Miami, at that time dubbed the Miami PAC (later named the Carnival Center and then later Adrienne Arsht Center for the Performing Arts), slated to break ground in 1998 and open sometime in 2003 or 2004. Due to several factors unrelated to the philharmonic, initial groundbreaking for the $412 million PAC was delayed until 1999 and after demolition of what was left of the old Sears building, work began on the new performing-arts center in ernest in 2001, and was beginning to take shape in 2003 more than a year after its intended resident ensemble (the Florida Philharmonic Orchestra) had dissolved, and the Carnival Center finally opened in late 2006 with a star-studded premiere minus the award-winning Florida Philharmonic Orchestra. and also with the announcement of its new resident ensemble, The Cleveland Orchestra.

=== 2000 strike ===
Contract negotiations during the summer of 2000 hit frequent sticking points, and tensions between the musicians and management hit an all-time high, with Sun-Sentinel music writer Lawrence A. Johnson suggesting that a strike was inevitable at this point given the ever-increasing tension within the organization through the 1990s. The primary point of debate was regarding the orchestra's wages, which were well below average. In 1991, music director James Judd argued that if management could not raise the musicians' salaries up to the level of Atlanta Symphony by 1993, then "there is a limit to what I can do for the orchestra." Nine years later in 2000, the orchestra was nowhere near that goal.

The management's last offer before what would have been the start of the 2000–01 season consisted of a five percent increase over one year. This was dismissed as "extremely disrespectful" by union representative Andrew Lewinter, who further commented that after two years of surpluses, it was time for the orchestra's salaries to catch up after pay freezes and concessions made by the musicians though harder economic times in the 1990s. The union's demands were derided by management attorney Susan Potter Norton as being based on "faulty logic". The musicians' union called a strike on September 25, however during the strike the musicians continued to perform free community concerts on a volunteer basis, not organized by the orchestra management.

The month-long strike ended after the orchestra accepted a thirty-percent pay increase over five years, though many musicians expressed frustration for what they considered a "vote for surrender" on job security issues. The musical silence ended on October 26, 2000, with a program of Beethoven's Fifth and Sixth Symphonies at the Broward Center for the Performing Arts.

=== Judd resignation ===
The period of time after the strike was marked by increasing economic difficulties. The philharmonic in 2001 announced efforts to fight off its financial woes, with pay concessions on the part of the musicians and cut-backs in the management structure, however this was quickly overshadowed by a major change to the orchestra's staff in the later part of the year. In November 2001, the Florida Philharmonic's music director of nearly fifteen years, James Judd, announced his resignation by releasing a press release to the media. When asked about Judd's departure, Bob Levinson, chairman of the philharmonic's board is quoted as having responded "It's news to me. You're telling me something I don't know."

The cracks in Judd's relationship with the orchestra had turned into an abyss by this point, with management blaming Judd's "mildly adventurous" and expensive programming for declining box office performance, and the orchestra's successful attempt to revoke Judd's power to unilaterally dismiss musicians who he considered not up to the task. His resignation came on the heels of the formation of an artistic committee which would share control with Judd over matters of programming.

James Judd was swiftly replaced on November 27, just seven days after his resignation, by veteran violinist and conductor Joseph Silverstein, who would take the title of acting music director for two seasons.

=== Collapse and bankruptcy ===
The financial predicament of the orchestra hit crisis mode in the spring of 2003. By this time, the orchestra's 80 musicians had already accepted a cut to salaries and benefits totaling $3.2 million in savings, but in April, the orchestra's chairman, Daniel R. Lewis, announced that unless the orchestra could raise an additional $20 million, the orchestra could be facing bankruptcy by early May. The orchestra at this point had already retained a bankruptcy attorney, and some management officials were already announcing the imminent doom of the orchestra in the press.

Though the amount of money the orchestra required to continue operations was reduced to $4 million, Executive Director Trey Devey said to the Sun-Sentinel that they had had "no significant progress" in reaching that amount. The orchestra's final concert was played on May 9, 2003, in Boca Raton, Florida. At the end of the concert, amidst tears among audience and orchestra members alike, and a thunderous applause that refused to end, Devey took the stage to plead for a "hero." Ninety minutes later, the orchestra announced that it was "terminating the employment" of its musicians.

The orchestra filed for chapter 11 bankruptcy protection on May 14, 2003. Despite hopes of a possible re-organization of the orchestra, the Florida Philharmonic never emerged from bankruptcy. Hopes for reorganization were further stunted when the 10-year Miami residency of the Cleveland Orchestra was announced in 2007.

=== Controversy regarding bankruptcy ===
The collapse of the orchestra raised a number of suspicions regarding how the management of the orchestra reacted to its financial difficulties. Perhaps the most widely questioned piece of the controversy is the "ultimatum," issued by orchestra chairman Dan Lewis on April 22, stating that bankruptcy was imminent unless the community would produce $20 million. This approach to fundraising has been criticized as being excessively confrontational and unlikely to provide results as it could create an attitude of unwillingness to contribute to an organization whose bankruptcy was imminent anyway. Dan Lewis, however, has defended this step as necessary, citing time constraints and saying that "I feel good about what we did. I feel terrible about the outcome, but I think we did a good job."

=== Cleveland Orchestra and conflicts of interest ===
The Miami-residency of the Cleveland Orchestra, which was announced shortly after the collapse of the Florida Philharmonic, is also mentioned as an irritating factor insofar as diverting the community's donor base which should have been allocated to the reconstruction of a South Florida-based orchestra, with one former member of the orchestra stating that it would "definitely prevent Miami and South Florida from having a symphony orchestra in the near future." Another former employee, this one a former artistic advisor to the orchestra, commented that "it discourages and maybe deters people from contributing the money necessary and the energy necessary to start to build a quality orchestra in Miami."

The connection between the Cleveland Orchestra and the South Florida classical community is personified by Daniel Lewis, a native of Cleveland. Lewis, while serving on the board of the Florida Philharmonic made unprecedented contributions to the Cleveland group, including a single donation of $10 million, the orchestra's largest ever. This has led to suggestions of a conflict of interest, given Lewis' financial support for the Cleveland Orchestra, questions regarding hasty and unprofessional handling of the Florida Philharmonic's financial problems, and his direct involvement in initiating Cleveland's residency in Miami during and after the Florida orchestra's collapse. Julian Kreeger, an FPO artistic advisor and James Judd's personal attorney, is quoted to have said that only "if one was paranoid" would one draw connections between Lewis and Cleveland's Miami residency. Others, including former musicians, assert that Lewis' motives when taking over the administrative leadership of the orchestra was to "kill the orchestra", paving the way for the Cleveland Orchestra's Miami-residency, a residency which initially proved itself to be quite financially fruitful for the Cleveland-based group.

=== Management issues ===
A Miami Herald editorial of May 15, 2003, pointed to managerial issues as significant to the overall collapse of the orchestra. Among these was how the financial difficulties seemed to catch the management by surprise, soaring with optimism one second, then the next announcing that "the end was near." The editorial also referenced constant rapid changes to the managerial staff as detrimental to establishing a real strategy for long-term growth.

Eyebrows have also been raised regarding orchestra chairman Daniel Lewis' April 22 fundraising-ultimatum, warning of the collapse of the orchestra if $20 million could not be produced imminently. One major donor to the South Floridian arts community commented that "it was ridiculous to ask for that kind of money in that time frame." Odder still was that when the community failed to produce the sum within 10 days, Lewis announced that they actually only needed $4 million, but definitely within a week, leading to the appearance that the orchestra's management didn't have a clear grasp of what they were doing.

=== Special programs ===
==== Beethoven by the Beach ====
Beethoven by the Beach was an annual music festival held by the Florida Philharmonic. The festival first occurred in July 1997, and was repeated in July every subsequent summer of the orchestra's existence. In addition to performances of Beethoven's musical works, the festival also featured lectures, films, and later expanded to include performances of works by other composers.

==== Beethoven Festival Youth Orchestra ====
As part of the 2002 Beethoven by the Beach Festival, the Florida Philharmonic formed the Beethoven Festival Youth Orchestra. This youth ensemble, directed by FPO violist Steven Svensson, performed one concert at the Broward County Main Library on July 7, 2002, as well as a side-by-side with the FPO on July 13, before the Florida Philharmonic's bankruptcy the following summer.

=== Venues ===
Broward Center for the Performing Arts

Fort Lauderdale, Florida

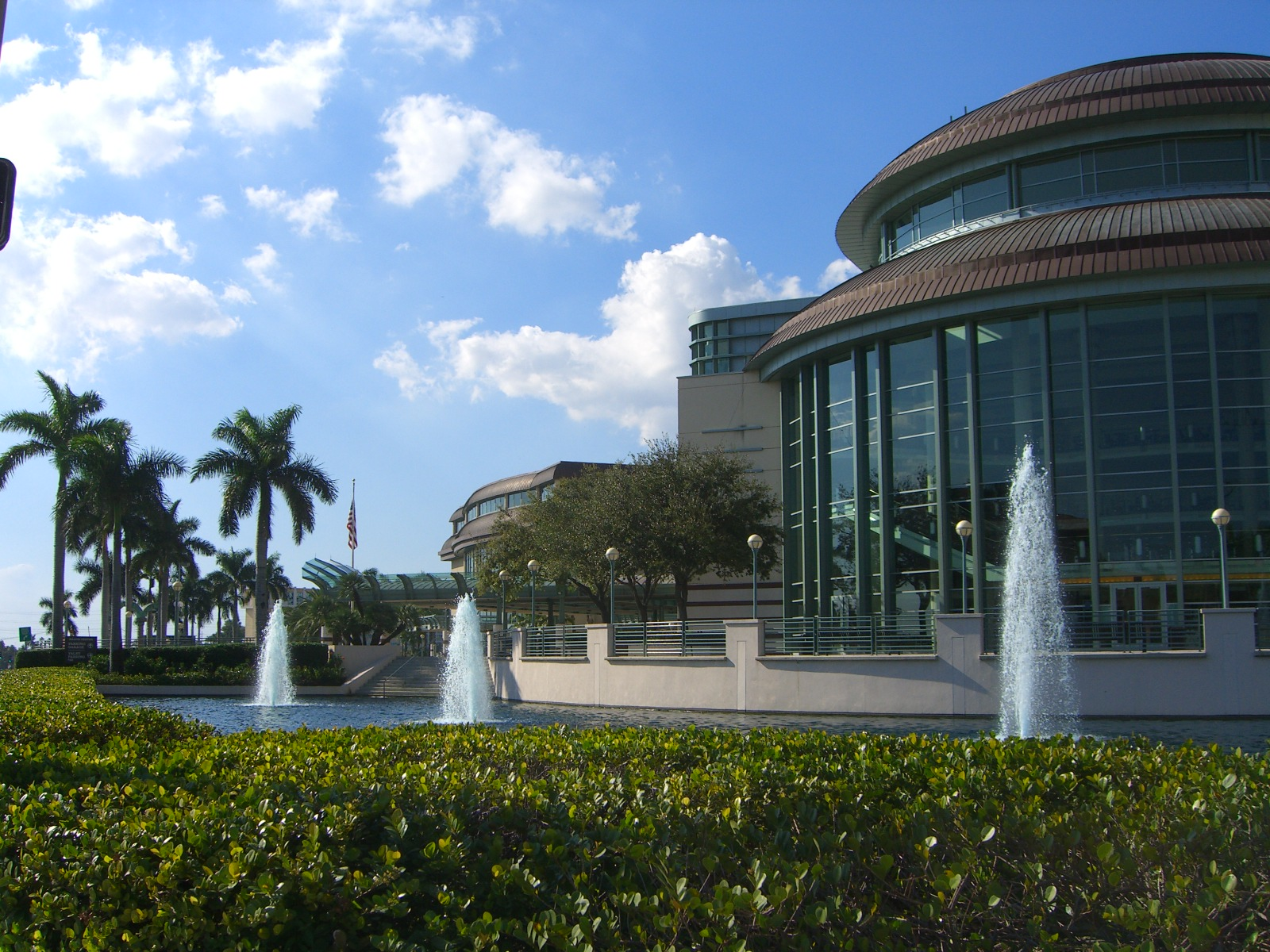
Raymond F. Kravis Center for the Performing Arts

West Palm Beach, Florida

Carole and Barry Kaye Performing Arts Auditorium

Florida Atlantic University Boca Raton, Florida

Gusman Center for the Performing Arts

Miami, Florida

Miami-Dade County Auditorium

Miami, Florida

Coral Springs Center for the Arts

Coral Springs, Florida
