= Sarah Coburn =

American operatic soprano

- Born: August 4, 1977 (age 49); Petersburg, Virginia
- Education: Oklahoma State University, Oklahoma City University (M.Mus.)
- Occupation: Opera singer
- Parent: Tom Coburn

Sarah Coburn (born August 4, 1977) is an American operatic soprano who was born in Petersburg, Virginia, and is the daughter of former United States Senator from Oklahoma, Tom Coburn. She graduated from Oklahoma State University and then received a Master of Music degree from Oklahoma City University, studying under Larry Wade Keller.

Coburn has an international career, singing in opera houses throughout the world.

== Professional career ==
In the field of opera, she first achieved recognition in 2001 as a National Grand Finalist in the Metropolitan Opera National Council Auditions.

Noted in Opera News magazine as a coloratura singer with a "silvery, resonant soprano" voice, Coburn has performed leading roles at the Metropolitan Opera in New York; the Vienna State Opera; and other major companies.

In 2004, she played the role of Johanna Barker in the musical Sweeney Todd at the New York City Opera.

In 2007 she succeeded Elizabeth Futral in the role of Princess Yue-Yang in the world premiere production of Tan Dun's The First Emperor at the Metropolitan. That same year she performed the role of Kitty in the world premiere of David Carlson's Anna Karenina at the Florida Grand Opera.

Her repertoire has included the leading roles of: Lucia in both Donizetti's Lucia di Lammermoor and its French version, Lucie de Lammermoor at Glimmerglass Opera and Cincinnati Opera; Amina in Bellini's La sonnambula in Vienna; Gilda in Verdi's Rigoletto at the Opéra de Montréal, Welsh National Opera, and Los Angeles Opera; the title role in Delibes' Lakmé at Tulsa Opera; Asteria in Handel's Tamerlano and Rosina in Rossini's Il barbiere di Siviglia, both with Los Angeles Opera.

In March 2014 she sang at the Washington National Opera as Adina in L'elisir d'amore by Gaetano Donizetti and, as part of the summer 2014 Tivoli Festival in Copenhagen, she sang the role of Elvira in I Puritani.
