= Richard Tucker Music Foundation =

American music organization

The Richard Tucker Music Foundation, founded in 1975, was created in honor of American opera singer Richard Tucker. The foundation is best known for awarding the annual Richard Tucker award, given to a young opera singer "on the threshold of a major international career," and for hosting the associated annual gala and concert.

== Details ==
The Sara Tucker Study Grant awards US$5,000 unrestricted grants to singers under the age of 27 who are selected through a vocal competition. Applicants must be recent graduates from a university or music conservatory and should be making the transition from student to professional singer. A candidate should have recently completed a graduate degree program or work in a young artist or Apprentice program at a regional company. Notable winners of this award include: Michael Maniaci (2002), Sarah Coburn (2004), and Lisette Oropesa (2007).

The Richard Tucker Career Grant awards US$10,000 unrestricted grants to singers, selected through a vocal competition, who have begun professional careers and who have already performed roles with opera companies nationally or internationally. A Career Grant candidate must be 36 years old or younger and should have a fair amount of performing experience in professional companies. Notable winners of this award include: June Anderson, Brian Asawa, Harolyn Blackwell, Stephanie Blythe, Christine Goerke, Susan Graham, Nathan Gunn, Jerry Hadley, John Keyes, Chris Merritt, Stephanie Novacek, and Chad Shelton.

The Richard Tucker Award is awarded to a single performer who has "reached a high level of artistic accomplishment and who, in the opinion of a conferral panel, is on the threshold of a major international career". The Richard Tucker Award, which includes a $50,000 cash prize, is selected by committee and not audition. The operative guideline for the Richard Tucker Award is that it be awarded to "an American singer poised on the edge of a major national and international career, and it is hoped that the award acts as a well-timed catalyst to elevate the artist's career to even greater heights."

The Richard Tucker Music Foundation also offers programs such as master classes and concerts in a variety of community settings which provide performance opportunities for award winners and enrich the cultural life of the communities in which they take place. These concerts are frequently broadcast on the radio.

== Richard Tucker Award recipients ==
- 1978 Rockwell Blake
- 1979 Diana Soviero
- 1980 Barry McCauley
- 1981 J. Patrick Raftery
- 1983 Susan Dunn
- 1984 Roger Roloff
- 1985 Aprile Millo
- 1986 Dolora Zajick
- 1987 Harry Dworchak
- 1988 Richard Leech
- 1989 Margaret Jane Wray
- 1990 Renée Fleming
- 1991 No award given
- 1992 Deborah Voigt
- 1993 Ruth Ann Swenson
- 1994 Jennifer Larmore
- 1995 Paul Groves
- 1996 Dwayne Croft
- 1997 David Daniels
- 1998 Patricia Racette
- 1999 Stephanie Blythe
- 2000 Gregory Turay
- 2001 Christine Goerke
- 2002 Joyce DiDonato
- 2003 John Relyea
- 2004 Matthew Polenzani
- 2005 Eric Cutler
- 2006 Lawrence Brownlee
- 2007 Brandon Jovanovich
- 2008 No award given
- 2009 Stephen Costello
- 2010 James Valenti
- 2011 Angela Meade
- 2012 Ailyn Pérez
- 2013 Isabel Leonard
- 2014 Michael Fabiano
- 2015 Jamie Barton
- 2016 Tamara Wilson
- 2017 Nadine Sierra
- 2018 Christian Van Horn
- 2019 Lisette Oropesa
- 2020 No Award Given
- 2021 No Award Given
- 2022 Angel Blue
- 2023 No Award Given
- 2024 Clay Hilley
- 2025 Nicholas Brownlee
