= Emerson Buckley =

American conductor (1916–1989)

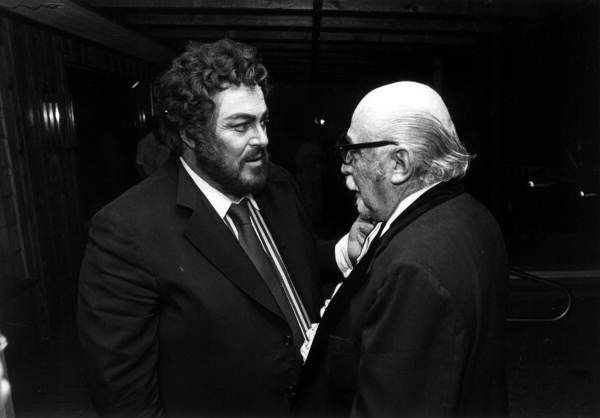
Luciano Pavarotti and Buckley

Emerson Buckley (14 April 1916 – 17 November 1989) was an American orchestra conductor.

== Biography ==
Buckley was born in New York City. After high school, he attended Columbia University, graduating in 1936. He began his conducting career that same year, obtaining a post with the Columbia Grand Opera Company. He spent 10 years as conductor of the Mutual Broadcasting System's in-house orchestra. He was a frequent guest conductor both in the United States and in other countries.

=== Florida years ===
Buckley left New York City in 1950 to establish a permanent residence in Fort Lauderdale, Florida. He was first named music director, and later artistic director, of the Greater Miami Opera. He held that post until 1985, when he retired due to ill health. During that time he "was instrumental in making it one of the most respected companies in the country". He joined the Fort Lauderdale Symphony Orchestra in 1963 as its music director, and molded it into a successful and stable regional orchestra. He merged that orchestra with the Boca Raton Symphony Orchestra to create the Florida Philharmonic Orchestra.

=== Other orchestral work ===
From March 1950 to January 1952 Buckley conducted the music of Elliot Jacoby for the American old-time radio series 2000 Plus. He also directed the orchestra for The Adventures of the Falcon on radio.

Buckley appeared several times through the years with the Central City Opera (Colorado), and with the New York City Opera. In 1985 he conducted Tosca at the Vienna State Opera at the request of leading tenor Luciano Pavarotti.

In the years of 1943, 1951, 1954, 1957, 1961, and 1964 to 1973, he conducted the Naumburg Orchestral Concerts in the Naumburg Bandshell, Central Park, New York City, in the summer series.

Buckley led the world premieres of two important American operas – The Ballad of Baby Doe (with Beverly Sills in the title role) (1956); and Robert Ward's The Crucible (1961).

He recorded for Sony Music, CBS Masterworks Records, Decca, and Deutsche Grammophon among others. He received Grammy Awards for his participation in the many recorded albums of classical and opera productions.

== Legacy ==
Buckley was widely admired for his dependability, professionalism, breadth of knowledge and taste.

"[Buckley] was known in the business as a champion of American music", said Willie Anthony Waters, who succeeded Buckley as artistic director of the Miami Opera. "And he was a successful American conductor at a time when American conductors were not looked at so seriously."

Buckley was taken seriously by several leading opera singers, including Plácido Domingo, who admired his thorough preparation and ability to pull performances together with limited rehearsal time. He conducted many of Pavarotti's concerts, from Boston's Esplanade (before 110,000 people) to a Las Vegas hotel, and collaborated with him on several nationally televised performances. Buckley appeared in two Pavarotti films, Yes, Giorgio!, and Distant Harmony, a documentary covering Pavarotti's tour of China (1986).

Despite acute back pain that had curtailed his activity, Buckley conducted Donizetti's opera L'elisir d'amore in Philadelphia, seven months before his death. He had to do his conducting while seated in a chair; his participation had been specially requested by leading tenor Pavarotti. He also was signed to conduct Pavarotti's appearance at the Miami Arena in early 1990, but had bowed out due to his increasing health deterioration.

== Personal life ==
Emerson Buckley married Mary Henderson, an accomplished voice teacher. They had two sons. The wife and sons survived Buckley when he died of emphysema at his residence in North Miami Beach on Friday, 17 November 1989.
