= Opera Naples =

David and Cecile Wang Opera Center
- Opera Naples
- Location in Florida Location in the United States
- Interactive map of David and Cecile Wang Opera Center
- Address: 2408 Linwood Avenue, Naples, Florida 34112
- Location: Naples, Florida, U.S.
- Coordinates: 26.135878°N 81.775439°W
- Owner: Opera Naples
- Operator: Opera Naples
- Capacity: 320
- Type: Opera house
- Event: Opera

Construction
- Built: 2014
- Opened: 2015

Website
- operanaples.org

Opera Naples is an American non-profit opera organization based in Naples, Florida.

Founded in 2005, Opera Naples presents opera performances, concerts and educational programs to the Southwest Florida community. Opera Naples is a member of Opera America.

== History ==
Opera Naples was founded in 2005. It debuted with a Viennese-style New Year's ball on December 31, 2005.

During its first decade, Opera Naples staged operas such as Carmen, Cosi fan Tutte, Don Giovanni, Elijah, Eugene Onegin, Faust, Il Trovatore, Isolante, La bohème, La Tragedie de Carmen, La Traviata, Le Nozze de Figaro, Madama Butterfly, Maria de Buenos Aires, Nabucco, Pagliacci, Verdi's Requiem, Rigoletto, Tango, The Barber of Seville, The Magic Flute, The Medium, The Telephone, and Tosca.

In 2021, in response to COVID-19 social distancing requirements, Opera Naples launched the Festival Under the Stars at Baker Park. The festival has since continued for consecutive years at Cambier Park.

In the 2024–25 season, Opera Naples collaborated with the Luciano Pavarotti Foundation and scheduled four fully staged operas for the first time since the pandemic. The season's repertoire includes Mozart's The Magic Flute, Puccini's La bohème and Gilbert and Sullivan's The Mikado.

== Management ==
Ramón Tebar has been the artistic and music director of the company since 2014. Melanie Kalnins is the executive director beginning 2024.
