= Anne Garber =

Anne Garber (1947 – 17 July 2011) was a Canadian journalist, restaurant critic, food and travel writer. Garber's media career spanned 44 years in print and electronic media. She was the author or co-author of 14 books on travel, bargains, access and food, and, with editor John T.D. Keyes (her husband), wrote food and travel features for magazines such as Grocer Today, Canadian Living, Chatelaine, Porthole and NUVO.

Garber wrote occasional pieces for The Vancouver Sun and The Globe and Mail, and she also contributed online to travellady.com. She was the managing director of the food-travel-entertainment site, evalu8.org. She wrote a weekly column for TV Week Magazine called "The Bargain Hunter".

Together with John Keyes, Garber co-authored the books Victoria's Best Bargains and Exploring Ethnic Vancouver, and an updated version of Cheap Eats Vancouver. Their food and travel writing appeared in publications as diverse as Canada's National newspaper, the Globe and Mail, and Vancouver's award-winning The Georgia Straight. Garber and Keys were also commissioned to write the Vancouver section of the Bradman's Business Guide, and they wrote a regular international travel column for the Culver City News.

After a year-long fight with cancer, Garber died on July 17, 2011, while an in-patient at the B.C. Cancer Agency hospital.

== Bibliography ==
- Garber, Anne; Keyes, John T. D. (1997). Anne Garber's Cheap Eats Vancouver. Burnaby, BC: Serious Publishing. p. 240. ISBN 0-9695187-9-X. OCLC. photographer: Garber, Anne; illustrator: Murphy, Nick.
- Garber, Anne; Gannon, Lorraine (1997). Vancouver's Best Bargains, reprint. Burnaby, BC: Serious Publishing. p. 534. ISBN 0-9695187-5-7. OCLC.
- Garber, Anne; Gannon, Lorraine (1996). Vancouver's Best Bargains. Burnaby, BC: Serious Publishing. p. 534. ISBN 0-9695187-5-7. OCLC.
- Garber, Anne; Keyes, John T.D.; Gannon, Lorraine (1995). Exploring Ethnic Vancouver. Burnaby, BC: Serious Publishing. pp. 164. ISBN 0-9695187-8-1. OCLC. illustrator: Murphy, Nick.
- Garber, Anne; Keyes, John T.D. (1994). Victoria's Best Bargains. Burnaby, BC: Serious Publishing. p. 238. ISBN 0-9695187-4-9. OCLC. illustrator: Murphy, Dan.
- Garber, Anne; Gannon, Lorraine (1994). The Vancouver Super Shopper (4th ed.). Burnaby, BC: Serious Publishing. ISBN 0-9695187-2-2. OCLC.
- Garber, Anne; Gannon, Lorraine (1992). The Serious Shopper's Guide to Vancouver . . . and Beyond. Burnaby, BC: Serious Publishing. OCLC.
- Garber, Anne (1991). Cheap Eats: Greater Vancouver's guide to cafes, diners, greasy spoons, coffee shops and other great eateries. Burnaby, BC: Serious Publishing. ISBN 0-9695187-1-4. OCLC. illustrator: Newland, Marv.
- Garber, Anne (1990). Shopping the World: over 300 mail order sources for Canadian consumers. Toronto, ON: Key Porter Books. ISBN 1-55013-259-8. OCLC.
- Garber, Anne; Crawford, John (1989). Vancouver Out to Lunch. Seattle, WA: Elliott & Fairweather. ISBN 0-9691246-6-X. OCLC.
- Garber, Anne; Crawford, John (1989). Rise 'n Shine Vancouver. Seattle, WA: Elliott & Fairweather. ISBN 0-9691246-7-8. OCLC.
- Garber, Anne (1986). The Vancouver Super Shopper (3rd ed.). Burnaby, BC: JASI. ISBN 0-9691246-2-7. .
- Garber, Anne (1984). The Vancouver Super Shopper (2nd ed.). Vancouver, BC: JASI. ISBN 0-9691246-1-9. OCLC.
- Garber, Anne (1982). The Greater Vancouver Super Shopper (1st ed.). Vancouver, BC: ASTA Productions. ISBN 0-9691246-0-0. OCLC.
