= Christine Goerke =

American dramatic soprano (born 1969)

Christine Goerke (born 1969) is an American dramatic soprano.

== Early life and education ==
The daughter of Richard Goerke and Marguerite Goerke, Goerke was born in 1969 in New York State. She grew up in Medford, New York, where she attended Tremont Elementary School, Oregon Avenue Middle School, and Patchogue-Medford High School. Following high school, Goerke attended SUNY Fredonia for one semester in the fall of 1986 as a music education major with a concentration in clarinet. During her time there Goerke became increasingly more interested in vocal music and ultimately decided to pursue a degree in vocal performance. In 1989, Goerke entered the undergraduate music program at Stony Brook University from which she graduated in the spring of 1994 with a degree in voice. Goerke went on to become a member of the Metropolitan Opera's Young Artist Program from 1994 to 1997.

== Career ==
Goerke began her career singing minor roles at the Metropolitan Opera as part of the company's Young Artist Program. Among other roles, she appeared as the First Lady in Mozart's Die Zauberflöte, the High Priestess in Verdi's Aida, and the Ship's Doctor/Space Twin in Philip Glass' The Voyage. In the 1997/98 season, Goerke sang her first major role at the Metropolitan Opera, Donna Elvira in Mozart's Don Giovanni.

In 1997, Goerke landed her first major role outside the Met, the title role of Iphigénie en Tauride with Glimmerglass Opera. She went on to perform the same role that year with the New York City Opera, and in concert with Boston Baroque at Jordan Hall in Boston in 2000, which was recorded.

After her voice changed, Goerke transitioned into playing parts that require a more powerful voice, such as the heroines of Wagner operas. In 2013, Goerke performed the role of the Dyer's Wife in Die Frau ohne Schatten at the Metropolitan Opera to wide critical acclaim, after which she was offered the role of Brünnhilde in the Met's 2018/19 production of the Ring Cycle. At the same house she sang the title role in Puccini's Turandot in 2015.

Goerke has developed a relationship with the Edinburgh International Festival, making her debut in the role of Brünnhilde in 2017's Die Walküre, returning for Siegfried in 2018 and concluding with Götterdämmerung in 2019.

In 2021, Detroit Opera (formerly, Michigan Opera Theatre) appointed Goerke as an Associate Artistic Director of the opera house. Goerke had previously performed in Fidelio (2013), Elektra (2014), and Twilight: Gods (2020, a pandemic-era production under new artistic director Yuval Sharon), and since sang the role of Santuzza in Cavalleria Rusticana. Upcoming (2022) performances with Detroit Opera include Brünnhilde in The Valkyries and Amneris in Aida In Concert alongside Angel Blue singing the title role. In 2021, Goerke's role telegraphed her eventual relocation to Detroit and her now crucial role in the artistic future of Detroit Opera. She maintains a thriving performance career, performing in three roles at the Metropolitan Opera in the 2023/24 season alone.

Goerke married James Holloway, a former chef who now works in his family's construction business, on October 2, 2005. They have two daughters.

== Honors ==
Goerke has received numerous awards and has won several music competitions. She won the Robert Jacobson Study Grant in 1994, an ARIA award in 1996, and a George London Award in 1996, and a Richard Tucker Career Grant in 1997. In 2001, Goerke was awarded the prestigious Richard Tucker Award. She has also been honored by the Lotte Lehmann Foundation She received a Distinguished Alumni Award from Stony Brook University in 2010.

Goerke is featured on two Grammy Award winning CDs: the 1999 recording of Benjamin Britten's War Requiem with the National Symphony Orchestra and the 2003 recording of Ralph Vaughan Williams's A Sea Symphony with Robert Spano and the Atlanta Symphony Orchestra. In 2014, she received the Helpmann Award for Best Female Performer in an Opera for her performance in Elektra with the Sydney Symphony Orchestra.

== Opera roles ==
- Agrippina, Agrippina (Handel)
- Alcina, Alcina (Handel)
- Alice Ford, Falstaff (Verdi)
- Ariadne, Ariadne auf Naxos (Richard Strauss)
- Armida, Rinaldo (Handel)
- Amneris "Aida" (Verdi)
- Brünnhilde, Die Walküre, Siegfried and Götterdämmerung (Wagner)
- Cassandre, Les Troyens (Berlioz)
- Chrysothemis, Elektra (Richard Strauss)
- Countess Almaviva, Le nozze di Figaro (Mozart)
- Donna Anna, Don Giovanni (Mozart)
- Donna Elvira, Don Giovanni (Mozart)
- The Dyer's Wife, Die Frau ohne Schatten (Richard Strauss)
- Elektra Elektra (Richard Strauss)
- Elettra, Idomeneo (Mozart)
- Ellen Orford, Peter Grimes (Benjamin Britten)
- Elisabeth, Tannhäuser (Wagner)
- Female Chorus, The Rape of Lucretia (Benjamin Britten)

- Fiordiligi, Così fan tutte (Mozart)
- Gutrune, Götterdämmerung (Wagner)
- Iphigénie, Iphigénie en Tauride (Gluck)
- Kundry, Parsifal (Wagner)
- Lady Macbeth, Macbeth (Verdi)
- Leonore, Fidelio (Beethoven)
- The Marschallin, Der Rosenkavalier (Richard Strauss)
- Musetta, La bohème (Puccini)
- Norma, Norma (Bellini)
- Mme. Lidoine, Dialogues des Carmélites (Poulenc)
- Ortrud, Lohengrin (Wagner)
- Rosalinde, Die Fledermaus (Johann Strauss II)
- Sieglinde, Die Walküre (Wagner)
- Senta, Der fliegende Holländer (Wagner)
- Third Norn, Götterdämmerung (Wagner)
- Turandot, Turandot (Puccini)
- Vitellia, La clemenza di Tito (Mozart)

== Selected discography ==
- Brahms' Liebeslieder Waltzes with Robert Shaw and the Robert Shaw Festival Singers, Telarc Records, 1993.
- Dvořák's Stabat Mater with Robert Shaw and the Atlanta Symphony Orchestra, Telarc Records, 2000.
- Thomas Beveridge's Yizkor Requiem, Naxos American Classics, 2000.
- Benjamin Britten's War Requiem with Robert Shafer and the National Symphony Orchestra, Naxos, 2000.
- Christoph Willibald Gluck's Iphigénie en Tauride with Boston Baroque, Telarc, 2000.
- Ralph Vaughan Williams's A Sea Symphony with the Atlanta Symphony Orchestra, Telarc, 2002.

== Videography ==
- James Levine's 25th Anniversary Metropolitan Opera Gala (1996), Deutsche Grammophon DVD, B0004602-09
