= Peter Glossop =

Operatic baritone

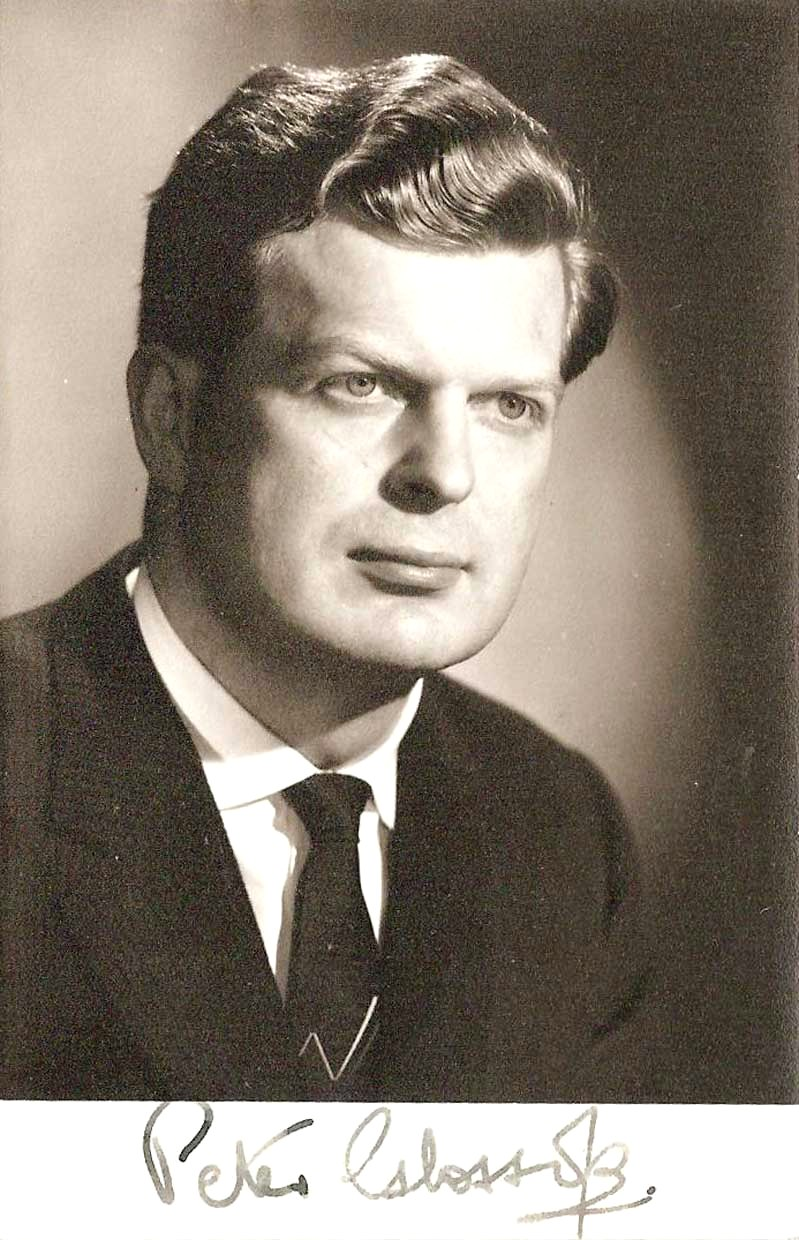
- Born: 6 July 1928; Wadsley, Sheffield
- Died: 7 September 2008 (aged 80); Rousdon, Devon
- Occupation: Baritone
- Years active: 1953-1986

Peter Glossop (6 July 1928 – 7 September 2008) was an English baritone who was the only Englishman to have sung Verdi's great tragic baritone roles at La Scala, Milan. He rose from humble beginnings in Yorkshire to become a leading performer in London and in the major opera houses of Europe and America.

== Early life and career ==
Peter Glossop was born in the Wadsley suburb of Sheffield, West Riding of Yorkshire, England, the son of Cyril Glossop, a manager at a cutlery factory. He was educated at High Storrs Grammar School and was introduced to opera by his mother Violet, who smuggled him into the Lyceum Theatre where she was working as a secretary. After National Service, he joined the National Provincial Bank as a clerk, and in his spare time sang with the Sheffield Operatic Society. His début in 1949 was in the dual role of Coppélius and Dr Miracle in Les Contes d'Hoffmann. He studied locally with Joseph Hislop and Eva Rich and was a finalist in the 1952 Great Caruso Contest. He joined the chorus of Sadler's Wells Opera the same year and continued his studies with Leonard Mosley. He was soon singing minor roles for the company, and his first professional role was Morales in Carmen in 1953. This was followed by Schaunard in La bohème and Silvio in Pagliacci. In 1955 Glossop was appointed as a company principal. During the next five years he sang most of the leading Verdi baritone roles, and was especially known for the title role in Rigoletto and for Di Luna in Il trovatore.

In 1961 Glossop won the gold medal at the International Operatic Competition in Sofia and was engaged by the Royal Opera House. His début at Covent Garden was as Demetrius in Britten's A Midsummer Night's Dream.His big breakthrough came in 1964 when he took over the title role in Rigoletto at very short notice and scored a great personal triumph. Other roles for the Royal Opera included Rodrigo in Don Carlos, Michele in Il tabarro, Tonio in Pagliacci, Marcello in La bohème and the title roles in Don Giovanni, Simon Boccanegra and Rigoletto. In 1964 Glossop won the Verdi gold medal at Parma following his great success at the Parma Opera also as Rigoletto. The following year Glossop sang the part of Donner in the Royal Opera House production of Ring cycle under Solti and in the same year he made his début at La Scala as Rigoletto. In 1966 he made his débuts in Paris and San Francisco in the role of Posa in Don Carlos. In June 1968 Glossop was picked by Herbert von Karajan to sing the role of Tonio in his film of the opera Pagliacci. Glossop succeeded so well that Karajan chose him to sing Iago in his new production at the Salzburg Festival in 1970. This would prove to be such a success that he would record his role in both Karajan's audio recording and film. Glossop's début at the Metropolitan Opera, New York, was in 1971 as Scarpia in Tosca. Later roles for the Metropolitan Opera included Don Carlo in La forza del destino, Billy Budd in Billy Budd, Balstrode in Peter Grimes and the title roles in Falstaff and Wozzeck. His career continued into the mid-1980s with appearances in London and the main European and American opera houses. His further repertory included Don Carlo in Ernani, Mandryka in Arabella, Pizarro in Fidelio and the title roles in The Flying Dutchman and Macbeth.

== Recordings and publication ==
Glossop made a number of recordings. These include Macbeth with Rita Hunter in the 1960s, Billy Budd under the composer, and the part of Choroebus in Berlioz's Les Troyens under Colin Davis. The 1964 performance of Pagliacci at Salzburg was filmed, as was the 1970 performance of Otello.

In 2004 Glossop published his autobiography The Story of a Yorkshire Baritone.

== Qualities and personality ==
Alan Blyth in Grove states "Although he was not the subtlest of actors, his portrayals were always sung and projected with eager conviction". Comments made elsewhere include that he was a "rumbustious Yorkshireman" who was "blessed with a booming, powerful voice and an occasionally coarse temperament". "He brought conviction to everything he sang, and his extrovert personality enhanced all his stage performances". "On stage he combined a rugged boldness with a robust vocal delivery".

== Personal life and retirement ==
In 1955 Peter Glossop married Joyce Blackham, an operatic soprano. This marriage was dissolved in 1977 and in that year he married Michelle Amos, a much younger ballet dancer. This marriage ended in divorce in 1986. Glossop decided to retire in 1986 following a performance as Sharpless in Madama Butterfly in Los Angeles. He retired to a village near Axminster, Devon. In his retirement he did some teaching and lecturing. He was made an honorary doctor of music by Sheffield University. He was passionately interested in jazz and compiled a large collection of Dixieland jazz records. Towards the end of his life he developed throat cancer. Peter Glossop is survived by two daughters from his second marriage.

== Discography ==
Title	Conductor	Orchestra	Format	Label	Release date
Billy Budd	Benjamin Britten	London Symphony Orchestra	LP	Decca	1966
Les Troyens	Colin Davis	Royal Opera House Orchestra	CD	Philips	1986
Dido and Aeneas	John Barbirolli	English Chamber Orchestra	CD	EMI Classical	1995
Ernani	Gianandrea Gavazzeni	Milan Radio Symphony Orchestra	CD	Opera d'Oro	1997
Caractacus	Charles Groves	Royal Liverpool Philharmonic Orchestra	CD	EMI British Composers	1998
Otello	Herbert von Karajan	Berlin Philharmonic Orchestra	CD	EMI Classical	1999
Roberto Devereux	Charles Mackerras	Royal Philharmonic Orchestra	CD	Westminster Legacy	2001
Otello	Herbert von Karajan	Berlin Philharmonic Orchestra	DVD	Deutsche Grammophon Unitel	2001
Merrie England	Michael Collins	Michael Collins Orchestra	CD	EMI Classics for Pleasure	2002
I gioielli della Madonna	Alberto Erede	BBC Symphony Orchestra	CD	Bella Voce	2002
Highlights from La traviata, Rigoletto, Il trovatore	John Matheson, Michael Moores	Sadler's Wells Opera Orchestra	CD	EMI Classics for Pleasure	2003
Choral Works by Giuseppe Paolucci	Herbert von Karajan	Vienna Philharmonic Orchestra	CD	Tactus	2003
Macbeth	John Matheson	BBC Concert Orchestra	CD	Opera Rara	2004
La forza del destino	John Matheson	BBC Concert Orchestra	CD	Opera Rara	2005
Billy Budd	Charles Mackerras	London Symphony Orchestra	DVD	Decca	2008
Anaanas Banaanas (by Werner Pirchner)	Herbert von Karajan	Vienna Philharmonic Orchestra	CD	Extraplatte	
