= Ramón Tebar =

Spanish conductor (born 1978)

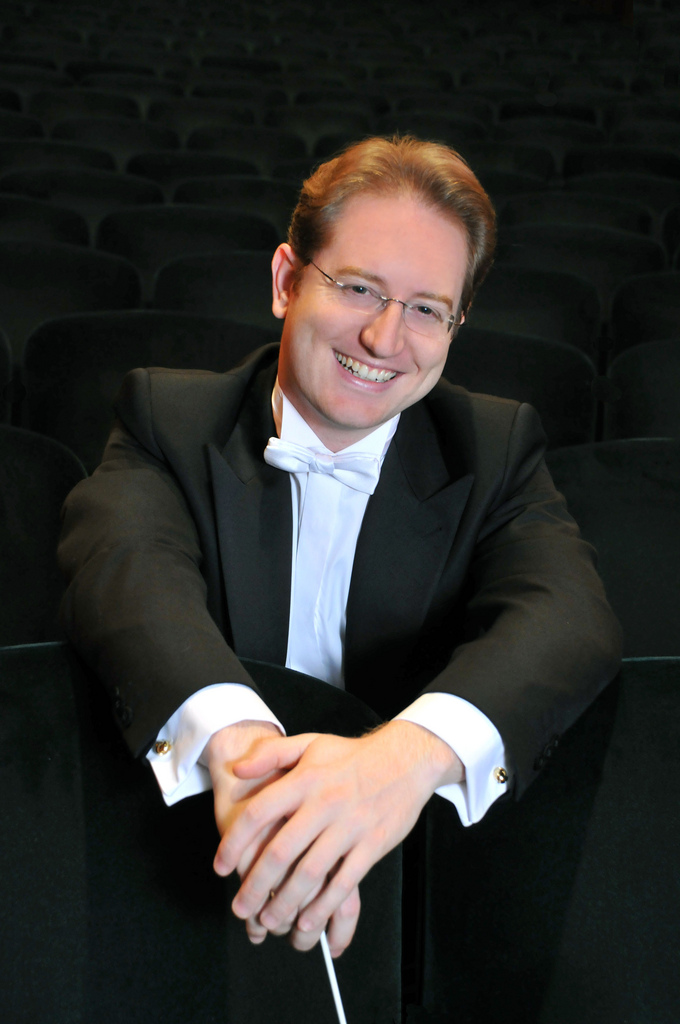

José Ramón Tebar Sáiz (November 6, 1978, Valencia, Spain) is a conductor and pianist, currently Principal Conductor at Florida Grand Opera. He is Artistic Director of Opera Naples. He was Music Director of the Festival of Santo Domingo, Dominican Republic (2009-2015). In March 2015, he was named Principal Guest Conductor of Spain's Palau de les Arts Reina Sofia.
