= Susan Kinsolving =

American poet

Susan Kinsolving is an American poet whose books include The White Eyelash, Dailies & Rushes (a finalist for the National Book Critics Circle Award) Peripheral Vision (2019) and Among Flowers.

Her work has appeared in numerous anthologies and publications including The New York Times Book Review, Poetry, Yale Review, The Paris Review, The New Republic, The Nation, and The Washington Post. A finalist for the Walt Whitman Award and the Yale Younger Series award, she has taught at Bennington College, California Institute of the Arts, University of Connecticut, Southampton College, and Chautauqua Institution. She has received international fellowships from France, Ireland, Italy, Switzerland, and Scotland.

Glimmerglass Opera commissioned her to write lyrics for a cantata, entitled Constellations, in collaboration with composer David Carlson. Several of her poems have been set to music and performed in the United States and abroad. She has been invited to present her poems at universities, clubs, libraries and literary festivals throughout the world. She is currently a Poet in Residence at The Hotchkiss School in Lakeville, Connecticut.
