= The Mines of Sulphur =

Opera by Richard Rodney Bennett

The Mines of Sulphur is an opera in three acts by Richard Rodney Bennett, his first full-length opera, composed in 1963. Beverley Cross wrote the libretto, based on his play Scarlet Ribbons, at the suggestion of Colin Graham, who eventually directed the first production in 1965. The opera is dedicated to Benjamin Britten, whose Aldeburgh Festival had originally commissioned the opera.

The Mines of Sulphur was premièred on 24 February 1965 at Sadler's Wells Theatre in London. It was also broadcast on BBC Radio Network Three on 5 March 1965, and produced in a version for BBC Television on 13 November 1966. It received numerous subsequent performances, including in Cologne, Marseille, Milan, Toronto, Los Angeles, and New York City (at the Juilliard School). Most productions were well received, except for one directed by John Huston at La Scala. After the mid-1970s, however, the work was mostly forgotten, until a popular revival by Glimmerglass Opera in 2004. The Glimmerglass production was then brought to the New York City Opera, and also commercially recorded in 2005. It had 7 performances at Wexford Festival Opera in 2008.

== Roles ==
Role	Voice type	Premiere Cast, 24 February 1965 (Conductor: Colin Davis)
Boconnion, a deserter	tenor	Gregory Dempsey
Tovey, a tramp	baritone	Gwin Griffiths
Rosalind, a gypsy	mezzo-soprano	Joyce Blackham
Braxton, a landowner	bass-baritone	Frank Olegario
Jenny, an actress	soprano	Catherine Wilson
Leda, an actress	contralto	Ann Howard
Fenney, an actor	tenor	David Hillman
Tooley, an actor	baritone	David Bowman
Sherrin, an actor/manager	bass	Harold Blackburn
Trim, a mute	silent (mime/dancer)	John Fryatt

== Synopsis ==
The opera is set in an old, decaying West Country manor house, in the mid-18th century. Rosalind has returned to the manor of Braxton, her master, where she had formerly been a servant and where Braxton had been treating her abusively. Boconnion, a military deserter wanted on charges of killing a man, and the tramp Tovey arrive. Boconnion, Tovey and Rosalind conspire to kill Braxton, and carry out this plan. The three steal Braxton's riches and begin to celebrate their new wealth, planning to escape with it as well.

A group of itinerant actors then arrives at the manor. Boconnion agrees to give them shelter, in return for entertainment. The troupe bears a resemblance to actors who had visited the manor centuries earlier. The actors present their newest play, The Mines of Sulphur, about an elderly count who weds a beautiful girl, who falls in love with the count's valet. The count threatens the lovers, and the girl urges the valet to kill the count. The play parallels the prior situation of Boconnion, Braxton and Rosalind. At the point just before the girl and the valet are about to kill the count, Boconnion halts the play. The actress Jenny (the wife in the play) faints, and Tooley takes her upstairs, where he discovers the murdered landowner. Boconnion imprisons the actors in the cellar and plans to set fire to the manor to get rid of them the next morning. Boconnion then kisses Jenny to taunt Rosalind, but then it is revealed that Jenny has the plague. A ballad from Jenny reaffirms a link between her troupe and the earlier actors. The actors then somehow have vanished from the locked cellar, and Jenny takes her leave. Rosalind, Boconnion and Tovey see that the manor door has the plague mark painted on it, and they stay in the manor, realizing that they are doomed.

== Recording ==
- Chandos CHSA 5036(2): Kristopher Irmiter, Beth Clayton, Brandon Jovanovich, James Maddalena, Dorothy Byrne, Brian Anderson, Michael Todd Simpson, Caroline Worra, Andrew Gorell; Glimmerglass Opera Orchestra; Stewart Robertson, conductor (live recording)

== Sources ==
- Susan Bradshaw. "The Mines of Sulphur". In L. Macy (ed.). Grove Music Online.
- Anthony Tommasini (2005-10-21). "A Composer Happily Returns To 'The Mines'". The New York Times. p. E1.
