= Fort Lauderdale Symphony Orchestra =

The Fort Lauderdale Symphony Orchestra was a Fort Lauderdale, Florida, symphony orchestra founded in 1949 by high school orchestra director John Canfield. The orchestra developed from an amateur group to a semi-professional orchestra with Emerson Buckley at the helm in 1963. In 1985, the orchestra merged with the Boca Raton Symphony Orchestra to form the Philharmonic Orchestra of Florida that would later be renamed the Florida Philharmonic, and would serve the South Florida metropolitan area until its financial collapse in 2003.
