= The Greater Good, or the Passion of Boule de Suif =

The Greater Good, or the Passion of Boule de Suif is an opera in two acts by contemporary American composer Stephen Hartke, with an English libretto by Philip Littell, based on the short story Boule de Suif by Guy de Maupassant. It was commissioned by the Glimmerglass Opera, and premiered on 22 July 2006 at Glimmerglass, in Cooperstown, New York.

== Synopsis ==
The opera is set in 1871, at the end of the Franco-Prussian War. In Act I, a group of French citizens flee Rouen, which has been occupied by the Prussians, travelling to Le Havre in a stagecoach. The prostitute Boule de Suif is initially snubbed by all of the other, more "proper" passengers. However, Boule is the only one to have planned ahead for the trip and brought a basket of food. She takes pity on her hungry travelling companions and shares her food with them. For Boule's kindness and generosity, they are all grateful and become friendly to her. When the coach reaches the village of Tôtes, the occupants are detained at an inn by Prussian soldiers.

In Act II, the travelers learn that the Prussian commandant will not permit them to continue on their way unless Boule sleeps with him. The others initially support Boule in rejecting the commandant's demand, but over time their attitude changes and they urge Boule to comply. Eventually, she complies for "the greater good". In the final scene, travelers resume their journey, but Boule is once again ostracized by those whom she had saved.

== Roles ==
		Premiere, 22 July 2006 (Stewart Robertson, conductor)
Boule de Suif	soprano	Caroline Worra
M. Loiseau	tenor	John David Dehaan
Mme. Loiseau	soprano	Jill Gardner
M. Carre-Lamadon	baritone	Christopher Burchett
Mme. Carre-Lamadon	mezzo-soprano	Christine Abraham
The Old Nun	soprano	Jeanine Thames
The Young Nun	mezzo-soprano	Katherine Calcamuggio
Le Comte de Breville	bass-baritone	Andrew Wentzel
La Comtesse de Breville	soprano	Elaine Alvarez
M. Follenvie	bass	Liam Moran
Mme. Follenvie	mezzo-soprano	Dorothy Byrne
Coachman	baritone	Matthew Worth
Cornudet	bass-baritone	Seth Keeton
Prussian Officer	tenor	Christian Reinert

== Critical response ==
Response to the opera in 2006 was mixed. Alex Ross of The New Yorker called The Greater Good "a tightly constructed, vividly imagined piece that may mark the emergence of a major opera composer." The Los Angeles Times, despite complaining that "exploring [the characters'] inner lives leads nowhere", praised Hartke's music for its liveliness and theatrical flair. On the other hand, the Toronto Star said that "Hartke's music, while easy enough to listen to, became even easier to forget".

== Recording ==
- Burchett Glimmerglass Opera Orchestra Robertson Naxos
