= Stewart Robertson =

Scottish conductor (1948–2024)

- Stewart Robertson, in the 1990s
- Born: Stewart Robertson; 22 May 1948; Scotland
- Died: 12 February 2024 (age 75)
- Education: Royal Scottish Academy of Music and Drama; Mozarteum; Vienna Academy
- Occupations: Conductor; Music journalist; Academic teacher
- Organizations: National Public Radio; Glimmerglass Opera; Florida Grand Opera; Florida International University; Atlantic Classical Orchestra; Opera Omaha

Stewart Robertson (22 May 1948 – 12 February 2024) was a Scottish conductor who worked internationally, especially in the United States from the 1980s, also as a radio journalist and academic teacher.

== Life and career ==
Stewart Robertson was born in Scotland on 22 May 1948. He attended the Royal Scottish Academy of Music and Drama and Bristol University. He studied piano in London with Denis Matthews, and conducting with Otmar Suitner at the Mozarteum in Salzburg and Hans Swarowsky at the Vienna Academy.

Robertson became the youngest conductor to lead a performance at the Cologne Opera since Herbert von Karajan. He served as music director of the Zurich Ballet and Scottish Opera's touring company. He conducted New York City Opera productions broadcast on Live from Lincoln Center.

In the early 1980's, he served as conductor of the San Jose Symphony Youth Orchestra. He also was music director of the San Bernardino Symphony and the Santa Fe Symphony. He led opera performances at the Lyric Opera of Chicago, Norwegian National Opera, the Detroit Opera, Opéra de Montréal and the Philadelphia Opera, among others.

In addition to being an active pianist, Robertson was a broadcast writer and lecturer on music who was seen and heard on National Public Radio, Public Broadcasting Service, BBC, and Swiss-Italian radio and television.

Robertson was music director of Glimmerglass Opera from 1988 to 2006, where he staged works by Benjamin Britten such as Death in Venice, and promoted American works including William Schumann's A Question of Taste and David Carlson's The Midnight Angel. When he retired, he was named conductor emeritus, recognizing his merits in developing the company. From 1998 to 2009, he served as artistic director and principal conductor of the Florida Grand Opera in Miami. He was also a professor of orchestral studies at Florida International University. Beginning in 2005 and until his death, he was the conductor of the Atlantic Classical Orchestra in Florida. From 2005 to 2008, he was artistic director and principal conductor of Opera Omaha.

Interested in new music, he conducted more than 100 world premieres in opera and for orchestra.

Robertson's commercial recordings include two productions of the Glimmerglass Opera, Richard Rodney Bennett's The Mines of Sulphur (Chandos), which was nominated for a Grammy Award, and Stephen Hartke's opera The Greater Good (Naxos).

Robertson and his wife Meryl had two children. He died on 12 February 2024, at the age of 75.
