= Joyce Blackham =

English opera singer (1934–2018)

Joyce Blackham (1 January 1934 – 4 June 2018) was an English operatic mezzo-soprano. She was known particularly for the title role in Bizet's opera Carmen, which she played in opera houses worldwide.

== Life ==
She was born in Rotherham, daughter of Albert Blackham, a steelworker, and wife Sarah, and was educated at Rotherham Girls' Grammar School. Aged 15 she won a singing competition at Butlin's in Skegness, and at 17 she won a talent competition at Bridlington.

She went to the Guildhall School of Music; there she studied with Joseph Hislop and, as Dorabella in a student production of Mozart's opera Così fan tutte, she gained attention. In 1955 she was invited to join the Sadler's Wells Opera Company; early roles there were Lola in Mascagni's Cavalleria rusticana and Olga in Tchaikovsky's Eugene Onegin. In 1962 she first played the title role in Carmen. She appeared in several operettas of Offenbach, and in 1965 she created the role of Rosalind in the opera The Mines of Sulphur by Richard Rodney Bennett. She remained with the company until 1974.

She also sang with Welsh National Opera and Scottish Opera. At Royal Opera, Covent Garden she first appeared in 1958 as Esmeralda in The Bartered Bride; she returned to Covent Garden occasionally, including a production of Rigoletto in 1973, as Maddalena.

She played the role of Carmen in many opera houses, including (each time with Plácido Domingo as Don José) at Fort Worth Opera in Texas in 1965, at New York City Opera in 1966, and at the Edinburgh Festival in 1977.

== Family ==
In 1955 Joyce Blackham married the baritone Peter Glossop. A daughter died soon after birth; another child was stillborn. The marriage was dissolved in 1977. Her later marriage to Burt Kyle was dissolved; her third husband Tony Deacon predeceased her.
