= Willie Anthony Waters =

American conductor (1951–2026)

Willie Anthony Waters (October 11, 1951 – March 9, 2026) was an American conductor. A specialist in opera, Waters was the first African-American to become artistic director of a major opera company, and is noted as one of the few black conductors to have experienced worldwide success.

== Early life and education ==
Waters was born on October 11, 1951, in Goulds, Florida, Miami, where he was also raised.

A graduate of the University of Miami, he received his master's degree in conducting from Memphis State University in 1975.

== Career ==
Waters made his professional conducting debut in 1979, with the Utah Symphony. He was the music director of the San Antonio Festival from 1983 until 1985. He was music director and principal conductor of the Florida Grand Opera from 1986 to 1995. He was the opera conductor and artistic director at the Houston Ebony Opera Guild from 1995 to 2008. He served as general and artistic director of the Connecticut Opera from 1999 to 2009. His repertoire during these years included Salome, Manon Lescaut, Die Walküre, Macbeth, Aida, Of Mice and Men, Falstaff, Bianca e Falliero, Cristoforo Colombo, La Gioconda, Turandot, Tosca, Carmen, and Lucia di Lammermoor.

Waters was a guest conductor at opera companies including the Australian Opera, Deutsche Oper Berlin, New York City Opera, Cape Town Opera, Fort Worth Opera, and San Diego Opera, also the Brucknerhaus Orchestra (Linz, Austria), Detroit Symphony, Essen Philharmonic (Germany), Florida Philharmonic, Indianapolis Symphony, Norwegian Radio Orchestra, Spoleto Festival, Southwest German Radio Orchestra, and Tallahassee Symphony. In 1995 he conducted the premiere of Porgy and Bess in Cape Town, South Africa.

In 2005, Waters received an honorary doctorate from the University of Hartford. Waters was the musical director of the Martina Arroyo Foundation and the Prelude to Performance Summer Opera Training Institute. Waters recorded for Philips the recital 'Ol' Man River', conducting bass Simon Estes with the Munich Radio Orchestra and a recital with the mezzo-soprano Shirley Verrett.

== Illness and death ==
Waters suffered a stroke around 2019 that kept him away from professional activity and was admitted for COVID-19 in 2020 in his hometown. Waters died in March 2026, at the age of 74.

== Awards and honors ==
Waters received the Prix de Martell, which recognizes champions of classical music, in 1991. He was the recipient of the National Opera Association's "Lift Every Voice" Legacy Award for 2013.

Cultural offices
| Preceded by Emerson Buckley | Music Director, Florida Grand Opera; 1986–1995 | Succeeded by James Judd |
