= Tamara Wilson =

American operatic soprano

Tamara Wilson (born c. 1982) is an American operatic soprano who has had an active international opera career since 2007. She has performed leading roles at the Canadian Opera Company, the English National Opera, the Houston Grand Opera, the Liceu, the Metropolitan Opera, the Paris Opera, and the Sydney Opera House among others. She is particularly known for her performances of heroines in the operas of Giuseppe Verdi and Richard Wagner. In 2016 she was nominated for the Laurence Olivier Award for Outstanding Achievement in Opera and was awarded the Richard Tucker Award, an award described by Opera News as "one of the most prestigious prizes in opera".

== Early life and education ==
Born in Arizona, Wilson grew up in the Chicago area. Her mother is a retired choir director and accompanist and her father has a career in the railroad industry. She graduated from Waubonsie Valley High School in 1999.

Wilson earned a Bachelor of Music degree in vocal performance from the University of Cincinnati – College-Conservatory of Music in 2004 where she was a pupil of soprano Barbara Honn. That same year she was a finalist in the Metropolitan Opera National Council Auditions; a competition she entered on a whim without any serious intent in pursuing an opera career. Her performance in the Met finals drew the attention of Diane Zola, the then General Manager at the Houston Grand Opera (HGO), and she subsequently joined the Young Artist Program at the HGO in 2005.

== Career ==
Wilson's big break came in 2007 when she made her opera debut replacing Patricia Racette for the entire run of the HGO's opening production of the 2007–2008 season as Amelia in Verdi's Un ballo in maschera to critical success. She has since returned to the HGO stage as two more Verdi heroines; Elisabetta in Don Carlos (2012) and Leonora in Il trovatore (2013), and is set to return as the Marschallin in Der Rosenkavalier in 2027. In 2008 she portrayed Countess Almaviva in The Marriage of Figaro with the Berkshire Opera Company and was awarded a Sara Tucker Study Grant from the Richard Tucker Music Foundation. She was later a recipient of the Richard Tucker Career Grant in 2011.

In 2009 Wilson portrayed the title role in Verdi's Aida at the Sydney Opera House for Opera Australia; the first of many performances of that role. Later that year she portrayed Alice Ford in Falstaff for her debut at the Washington National Opera; returning to the WNO in 2010 as Amelia. She also appeared at the Canadian Opera Company (COC) in 2009–2010 as Amelia Grimaldi in Verdi's Simon Boccanegra, and as Elettra in Mozart's Idomeneo.

In 2011 Wilson made her debut at Carnegie Hall singing the role of the Virgin Mary in Honegger’s Jeanne d'Arc au bûcher with conductor Marin Alsop leading the Baltimore Symphony Orchestra, and made her debut at the Los Angeles Opera as Miss Jessel in Britten's The Turn of the Screw. That same year she made her European debut as Ada in Wagner's Die Feen at the Oper Frankfurt and performed Aida for her debut at the Municipal Theatre of Santiago. Her performance as Ada was recorded for the Oehms Classics label.

In 2012 Wilson made her debut at the Théâtre du Capitole as Leonora, returned to the Canadian Opera Company as Rosalinde in Die Fledermaus, and made her debut at the Ravinia Festival as Elettra in Idomeneo with the Chicago Symphony Orchestra under conductor James Conlon. She later returned to Ravinia in 2014 to perform the role of Donna Anna in Mozart's Don Giovanni. In 2013 she returned to Carnegie Hall to perform the role of Malwina in Heinrich Marschner's Der Vampyr with the American Symphony Orchestra.

In 2014 Wilson made her debut at the Metropolitan Opera as Aida. In 2015 she made her debut at the English National Opera as Leonora in Verdi's La forza del destino; a performance which earned her an Olivier Award nomination. Also that year she performed Aida at the Aspen Music Festival and the Teatro Principal de Palma de Mallorca. She appeared as Amelia at the Deutsche Oper Berlin in 2016 and as Elisabetta at the Bayerische Staatsoper in 2017.
