= Brandon Jovanovich =

American operatic tenor (born 1970)

Brandon Jovanovich (born 5 October 1970) is an American operatic tenor whose repertoire encompasses Wagner, Puccini, Strauss, Britten, and from early Baroque to world premiere operas. He is most known for his passionate portrayals of Slavic, French and German operas. His signature roles include Don José in Bizet's Carmen, B. F. Pinkerton in Puccini's Madama Butterfly, Cavaradossi in Puccini's Tosca, and the title role in Wagner's Lohengrin.

The 2007 Richard Tucker Award winner keeps a demanding schedule that sees him performing in both concerts and operas through the world.

== Early life and education ==
Brandon Jovanovich is a native of Billings, Montana. He began singing in church choir at a young age.

Jovanovich excelled in sports and was awarded a football scholarship to the University of Mary in Bismarck, North Dakota. After one year in North Dakota he applied for admission at Northern Arizona University and was accepted into the music department with a scholarship. Initially, it was not his intention to become a singer but vocal performance was a requirement of the music program. He was thought to be a bass-baritone at first and sang in the chorus in Carousel, then he was assigned as understudy for the role of Sarastro in The Magic Flute (in English). When the principal was unable to perform, he had to take over. He failed to meet some of the academic requirements for his music degree and so he switched to the theatre department in his final years, where he performed in roles from Neil Simon, Shakespeare and Sondheim.

Jovanovich moved to New York City in the mid-1990s, where he dabbled in modeling, acting, musical theater, operetta and eventually opera. Having apprenticed with the Santa Fe Opera in 1996 and 1997, he asked to sing the role of Giovanni in Daniel Catán's opera La hija de Rappaccini. He was awarded a scholarship and was enrolled at the Manhattan School of Music until 1998. Concurrently he was singing with the New York Gilbert and Sullivan Players (NYGASP). Between 1995 and 1999, he sang in seven operettas with that company both in New York and on tour, but it was his performance of Luiz in The Gondoliers that brought his first mention in the New York Times.

== Career ==
Brandon Jovanovich started singing professionally while at the Manhattan School of Music. From New York Gilbert and Sullivan Players to New York City Opera's outreach program, he slowly cultivated a working relationship with companies in the New York area.

His first major operatic role was in the summer of 1999 with Smetana's The Two Widows at the Chautauqua Opera. Abroad, his first foray into Europe was as Don José in l'Opera de Bordeaux's production of Carmen in 2000.

He has since gone on to perform major roles through both continents at leading opera houses. Some of the highlights include the title role in The Tales of Hoffmann at La Scala; Don José at the Metropolitan Opera, Bayrische Staatsoper, Gran Teatro di Liceu, Deutsche Oper Berlin, Arena di Verona, Zurich Opera, Washington National Opera, de Vlaamse Opera, National Center for the Performing Arts (Beijing) and Chicago Lyric Opera; B. F. Pinkerton at the New York City Opera, San Francisco Opera, LA Opera, Santa Fe Opera, Staatstheater Stuttgart, Théâtre du Capitole de Toulouse and the Dallas Opera; Cavaradossi with de Vlaamse Oper, Oper Köln, Canadian Opera Company, Seattle Opera, Bregenz Festival and Opera de Bordeaux; the title role in Wagner's Lohengrin with the San Francisco Opera; Siegmund in Die Walküre with the San Francisco Opera and Baltimore Symphony; Bacchus in Strauss' Ariadne auf Naxos with the Lyric Opera of Chicago and Boston Lyric Opera; the title role in Verdi's Don Carlos with the Houston Grand Opera; Turiddu in Cavalleria rusticana at the Houston Grand Opera, Dallas Opera, Angers-Nantes Opéra, Palm Beach Opera and New York City Opera; Luigi in Puccini's Il tabarro with the San Francisco Opera and Angers-Nantes Opéra; Boris in Janáček's Káťa Kabanová at the Lyric Opera of Chicago; Steva in Janáček's Jenufa at the Bayrische Staatsoper and Angers-Nantes Opéra; the title role in Britten's Peter Grimes with Teatro di San Carlo in Napoli; Pollione in Bellini's Norma at Teatro Verdi (Trieste) and Angers-Nantes Opéra; the Earl of Essex in Britten's Gloriana at the Opera Theatre of Saint Louis; Des Grieux in Puccini's Manon Lescaut at La Monnaie (Brussels); and Sergei in Shostakovich's Lady Macbeth of Mtsensk at Zurich Opera and Austin Lyric Opera.

More contemporary works include the American premiere of Jonathan Dove's Flight as Bill at the Boston Lyric Opera and Opera Theatre of Saint Louis; Hans Buchner in the world premiere of Marco Tutino's Senso at Teatro Massimo (Palermo); the world premiere of David Carlson's Anna Karenina as Constantin Levin with Opera Theatre of Saint Louis and Florida Grand Opera; as Boconnion in the American premiere of Richard Rodney Bennett's The Mines of Sulphur with Glimmerglass Opera; Lord Geoffrey in the American premiere of The Picture of Dorian Gray by Lowell Liebermann at the Florentine Opera (Milwaukee); and the San Francisco Opera premiere of Carlisle Floyd's Susannah in 2014.
