= John Keyes (tenor) =

American operatic tenor

John Keyes is an American operatic tenor who specializes in the dramatic repertoire. After his studies in Chicago, he apprenticed and performed at the Lyric Opera of Chicago and the Houston Grand Opera during the late 1980s. In 1990 he won an international singing competition in San Antonio and was awarded the Richard Tucker Career Grant. He made his European debut the following year as Siegmund in Richard Wagner's Die Walküre at the Scottish Opera.

Keyes has since performed leading roles at major opera houses internationally, including the Bavarian State Opera, De Nederlandse Opera, the English National Opera, the Hamburg State Opera, the Hawaii Opera Theatre, the Metropolitan Opera, the Michigan Opera Theatre, the National Theatre Mannheim, Opera Australia, Opera de Nantes, Opera Pacific, the Palacio de Bellas Artes, the San Francisco Opera, the Teatro Colón, the Théâtre du Capitole, the Toledo Opera, the Tulsa Opera, and the Vlaamse Opera. Among the roles he has performed are Calaf in Turandot, Canio in Pagliacci, Don José in Carmen, Eisenstein in Die Fledermaus, Erik in The Flying Dutchman, Florestan in Fidelio, Jean in Hérodiade, Pollione in Norma, Radames in Aida, Ramirez in La Fanciulla del West, Rodrigo in Rossini's Otello, Samson in Samson et Dalila, Tristan in Tristan und Isolde, Turridu in Cavalleria Rusticana, Walther in Tannhäuser, and the title roles in Don Carlos, Lohengrin, Verdi's Otello, Parsifal, and Siegfried. He is also active as a concert soloist, and is particularly known for his performances of Ludwig van Beethoven's Symphony No. 9.

== Sources ==
- Keyes&language=en Biography of John Keyes at operissimo.com
