= Boca Raton Symphony Orchestra =

American chamber orchestra (1983–1985)

- Chamber orchestra
- Founded: 1983, by Paul McRae and George McNally
- Disbanded: 1985 (merged); 2003
- Later name: Merged to become the Philharmonic Orchestra of Florida
- Location: Boca Raton, Florida, U.S.

The Boca Raton Symphony Orchestra was a chamber orchestra based in Boca Raton, Florida, founded in 1983 by the Fort Lauderdale Symphony Orchestra's principal trumpeter, Paul McRae, and assistant principal violist, George McNally.

There was a great deal of overlap between the Boca Raton and Fort Lauderdale groups from the beginning, and in 1985, the two orchestras were legally merged to form the Philharmonic Orchestra of Florida (whose name was changed to Florida Philharmonic Orchestra in 1992) which would serve the South Florida community until its financial collapse in 2003.
