= John T. D. Keyes =

Canadian journalist

John T. D. Keyes is a Canadian journalist and the past editor both of Canada's largest circulation magazine, TV Guide, and of the prestigious city magazine Vancouver, which under his editorship won Magazine of the Year in 1993.

As a staff and freelance writer, his multifaceted assignments have taken him through the United States (notably California, where he lived for two years as TV Guide's Hollywood Bureau Chief), the UK and Eastern Europe, Latin America and China. His national magazine work has been featured in Canadian Living, Chatelaine and Homemakers; international publications in which his work has appeared include Marie Claire (UK), Now Magazine (UK) and You (South Africa). As a media consultant, his clients have ranged from the BC Government to Emmy Award-winning Canadian filmmakers. He is a voting member in good standing of the Vancouver Film Critics Circle.

Together with Anne Garber, Keyes co-authored the best-selling books Victoria's Best Bargains and Exploring Ethnic Vancouver and an updated version of Cheap Eats Vancouver. Their food and travel writing has appeared in publications as diverse as Canada's National newspaper, the Globe and Mail, Vancouver's award-winning Georgia Straight and NUVO, Canada's answer to the high-end Robb Report
