= Stephen Hartke =

American composer (born 1952)

- Notable work: Meanwhile – Incidental Music to Imaginary Puppet Plays
- Awards: Grammy Award for Best Contemporary Classical Composition (2013)

Stephen Paul Hartke (born July 6, 1952) is an American composer. Hartke is best known as the composer of Meanwhile – Incidental Music to Imaginary Puppet Plays, winner of the Grammy Award for Best Contemporary Classical Composition in 2013.

Following a twenty six-year tenure at the Thornton School of Music of the University of Southern California, Hartke became the head of Oberlin Conservatory's composition department on July 1, 2015.

== Life ==
Hartke was born in Orange, New Jersey. He studied at Yale University, the University of Pennsylvania, and the University of California, Santa Barbara. From 1984 to 1985, he was Fulbright Professor at the Universidade de São Paulo, Brazil. He joined the faculty of the Thornton School of Music at the University of Southern California in 1987. He was composer in residence at the Los Angeles Chamber Orchestra from 1988 to 1992. In 2015, he took Emeritus status at USC when he moved to Oberlin Conservatory to chair its composition department.

Hartke has received commissions from numerous groups, including the Orpheus Chamber Orchestra for the new Brandenburg Project, Glimmerglass Opera (for The Greater Good, or the Passion of Boule de Suif), the New York Philharmonic, the National Symphony Orchestra, and the Hilliard Ensemble. He received a Guggenheim Fellowship in 1997, a Charles Ives Prize from the American Academy of Arts and Letters in 2004, and the Charles Ives Opera Prize from the American Academy of Arts and Letters in 2008. His composition Meanwhile – Incidental Music to Imaginary Puppet Plays won a Grammy Award for Best Contemporary Classical Composition in 2013.

Hartke's musical influences include Stravinsky, medieval music, Tudor church music, bebop, gagaku, gamelan, other non-Western musics, and his teachers Leonardo Balada and George Rochberg.

Stephen Hartke lives in Oberlin, Ohio, with his wife Lisa Stidham and their son Sandy.
