= David Carlson =

American composer (born 1952)

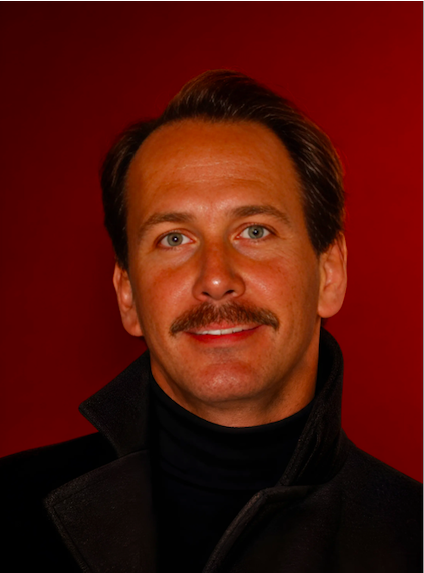
American composer David Carlson, 1994

David Carlson (born March 13, 1952) is an American composer.

== Early life ==
Carlson studied theory and composition at the Los Angeles High School of the Arts and with Leonard Stein at the California Institute of the Arts. From 1988 to 1992 he was coordinator of the San Francisco Symphony's New and Unusual Music series.

== Career ==
David Carlson's symphonic works have been performed by the Philadelphia Orchestra, the National Symphony Orchestra (United States), the San Francisco Symphony, the BBC Symphony, the Atlanta Symphony Orchestra, St. Louis Symphony Orchestra, Tanglewood Festival, and others. He has composed several chamber pieces, including a Cello Sonata, a large work for cello and male chorus called Nocturno, and two cello concertos, as well as a large work for viola and piano called True Divided Light, premiered in 2005. Carlson is the recipient of an Academy Award in Music from the American Academy of Arts and Letters, two commissions from Meet the Composer, Chamber Music America, and several other grants and fellowships. He has written four operas, three of which have had numerous performances. The Midnight Angel, to a libretto and original story by author Peter S. Beagle, was commissioned by Opera Theatre of St. Louis, Glimmerglass Opera, and Sacramento Opera; in 2007 it received a new production by Milwaukee's Skylight Opera Theatre. Dreamkeepers, with an original story and libretto by Aden Ross, was commissioned by the Utah Opera in celebration of the 1996 Utah Centennial and given a new production by the Tulsa Opera in 1998. Anna Karenina, in collaboration with noted British librettist and director Colin Graham, was commissioned by Florida Grand Opera in celebration of the 2007 opening of the Ziff Opera House in Miami, with a co-production by Opera Theatre of Saint Louis. Anna Karenina received a new production in September 2010 by Opera San Jose, and was performed again in April 2016 by Moores Opera Center at the University of Houston. Its European premiere was staged in a new production by Theater Hof in Germany in 2024.

== Selected compositions ==
Carlson's works are published by Carl Fischer Music, Inc., New York.

Orchestra

- Toccata Robotica for orchestra (2010)
- Serenade for chamber orchestra (based on a keyboard work by J. C. Bach) (2006)
- Episodes from the opera Anna Karenina (2006)
- Bear Dance on Ute Indian Rhythms (2001)
- Quantumsymphony (2001)
- Symphonic Sequences from the opera Dreamkeepers (1996)
- Twilight Night (1989)
- Lilacs [Epitaph] (1991)
- Rhapsodies (1986)
- Quixotic Variations (1978)

Concertante

- Tuba Concerto (2014) for double string orchestra and harp
- Cello Concerto No. 1 (1979)
- Violin Concerto (1988)
- Cello Concerto No. 2 for solo cello and string orchestra or 15 solo strings (1997)

Chamber music

- Two Elegies for Flute, Oboe, Clarinet, Bassoon, Harp, and Piano (2017)
- Offering for Cello and Harp (2017)
- Incendiary Devices Three Tone Poems for Saxophone Quartet and Piano (2014)
- Woodwind Quartet (Flute, Oboe, Clarinet, Bassoon) (2010)
- String Quartet No. 2 (2008)
- True Divided Light, for viola and piano (2005) (also version for Violin and Piano)
- Absolute Music for saxophone quartet (2001)
- Glimmerglass Fanfare for brass quintet (2000)
- Quantum Quartet for clarinet, viola, cello and piano (1998)
- Resurrection for organ (1989)
- Sonata for cello and piano (1992)
- String Quartet No. 1 (1982)
- Hymnal Variations for piano 4 hands (1968)

Opera

- Anna Karenina (2007); libretto by Colin Graham
- Dreamkeepers (1996); libretto by Aden Ross
- The Midnight Angel (1993); libretto by Peter S. Beagle

Chorus and orchestra

- Hymn, for SATB chorus and orchestra (poem by Edgar Allan Poe)
- Dona Nobis Pacem for chorus SATB, string orchestra, and celesta
- Constellations for chorus SATB, string orchestra, and harp (2000); text by Susan Kinsolving (also version for SATB chorus and orchestra)
- Nocturno (1991); Latin text from Psalms 113, 90, and 148
- Missa Lyrica (1969); Latin text

Vocal music

- Two Poe Songs for soprano and piano; poems by Edgar Allan Poe ("Dream Within a Dream" and "Hymn"
- Himmelfarbenlied for soprano and piano; original lyrics by Susan Kinsolving (commissioned by Opera America)
- Dona Nobis Pacem, for chorus SATB, organ, and off-stage celesta (2010), Latin text from Psalm 133
- The Promise of Time, 3 Songs for soprano and large orchestra (2010); texts by Susan Kinsolving
- Vocalise for soprano and piano (2005)
- Constellations, Cantata for chamber chorus (2000); text by Susan Kinsolving
- Nocturno for solo cello and 8 male voices (1990); Latin text from Psalms 113 and 90
- The Martyrdom of Saint Sebastian, (1985) Concert Scene for tenor and orchestra
- "Nocturno", for SATB chorus, organ, and harp (2012), text from Psalms 113, 90, and 148

== Recordings ==
- New World Records CD: Symphonic Sequences from Dreamkeepers/Rhapsodies/Twilight Night/Cello Concerto No. 1; Stewart Robertson, conductor; Emil Miland, cello; The Utah Symphony.
- Signum Records CD (London): Anna Karenina, Opera in Two Acts, Opera Theatre of Saint Louis, Stewart Robertson, conductor; The Saint Louis Symphony Orchestra
- MSR Classics CD (U.S.): "True Divided Light" for Viola and Piano/Sonata for Cello and Piano, Geraldine Walther, viola; Emil Miland, cello; David Korevaar, piano. MS1283
- The Opera America Songbook: "Himmelfarbenlied," Kelly Ann Bixby, soprano; Thomas Bagwell, piano. Lyrics by Susan Kinsolving. Available on Amazon. Sheet music published by Schott, New York.
