= Florida Grand Opera =

Opera company in Miami, Florida, United States

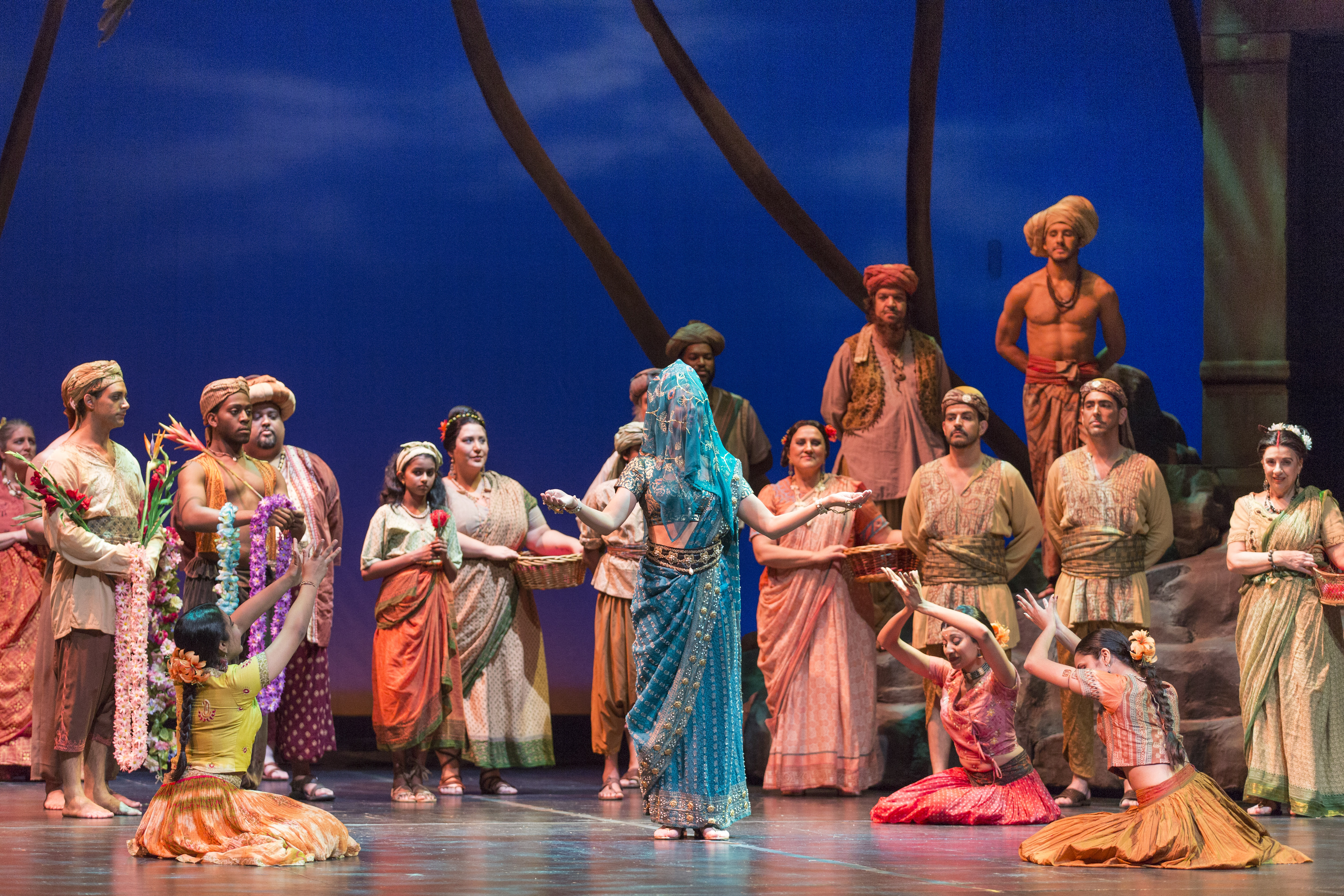
Scene from a 2015 performance of Les pêcheurs de perles by Georges Bizet

Florida Grand Opera (FGO) is an American opera company based in Miami, Florida. It is the oldest performing arts organization in Florida and the seventh oldest opera company in the United States. FGO was created in 1994 from the consolidation of two opera companies in the Miami-Fort Lauderdale region: Opera Guild of Greater Miami, founded in 1941 by Arturo di Filippi; and the Opera Guild, Inc. of Fort Lauderdale, formed in 1945.

== Location ==
FGO is the resident company at the Ziff Ballet Opera House, located in the Adrienne Arsht Center for the Performing Arts in Miami, and also at the Au-Rene Theater at the Broward Center for the Performing Arts in Fort Lauderdale. FGO sometimes stages at other area theaters, including Lauderhill Performing Arts Center in Broward County and the Miami Shrine Temple in Miami-Dade.

== History ==
=== Founding and early years ===
In 1941, the company was founded as the Opera Guild of Greater Miami by Arturo di Filippi, a tenor and voice teacher at the University of Miami. It later became known as the Greater Miami Opera Association. di Filippi brought many international stars to the Miami stage, among them a then-unknown Luciano Pavarotti who replaced an ailing colleague in a 1965 production of Lucia di Lammermoor starring Joan Sutherland. He went on to sing many other roles on the Greater Miami Opera stage.

=== 1950-1996 ===
Under the name the "Greater Miami Opera", Emerson Buckley was the company's music director from 1950 to 1973 and then served as artistic director and principal conductor through 1986. Willie Anthony Waters, who had become Chorus Master of the company in 1982, then served as artistic director from 1986 through 1992 and principal guest conductor from 1992 to 1995. From 1973 - 1985, Robert "Bob" Herman, Rudolf Bing's former assistant general manager at the Metropolitan Opera, helmed the Greater Miami Opera. This period continued to see international singers appearing on the stage and over 35 original productions. Under Herman's leadership, the opera achieved national prominence. Following Herman's retirement, Robert Heuer served as General Director from 1985 - 2012, when he was replaced by Susan T. Danis. She is FGO's first female General Director and CEO. In 2024, Maria Todaro took over as General Director and CEO.

=== 1997-2023 ===
Stewart Robertson was FGO music director from 1997 to 2010. On June 1, 2011, Ramón Tebar became FGO's music director. He also became the first Spanish conductor to lead both an American opera company and an American symphony. In 2014, Tebar took the title of principal conductor with the company. FGO does not currently employ a principal conductor, instead relying on a series of guest conductors including Gregory Buchalter, Jerri Lynn Johnson, Michael Ching, Anthony Barrese, and Marlene Urbay. In 2022, Marlon Daniel joined the music staff as Associate Conductor.

In 2006, FGO moved its principal performing venue from the Dade County Auditorium to the new Adrienne Arsht Center for the Performing Arts. After Danis took the reins in 2012, she retired the more than $19 million that had accumulated under her predecessor by selling the company's Fort Lauderdale rehearsal space, scaling back the season, and other tactics. 2022 marks Danis' decade of leadership at FGO, during which time she has also established a "Made in Miami" series, kept the opera afloat through the global COVID-19 pandemic, and championed contemporary works. After 11 years of serving as General Director and CEO of Florida Grand Opera, Susan T. Danis stepped down from her role. In her place, the Board of Directors appointed Maria Todaro as Interim General Director. Todaro's leadership began just as the 2023-2024 season commenced, featuring La Traviata, Pagliacci, and La Bohème. These productions were well-received, both critically and commercially, with Todaro's approach praised for making opera more accessible to diverse audiences.

=== 2024 - Present ===
In 2024, the FGO Board of Directors appointed a new Chair, Tina Vidal-Duart, and appointed Maria Todaro as General Director and CEO.

The organization has launched several new endeavors aimed, including:

- five new education programs aimed at engaging area children with opera;
- "The Vault", a project in partnership with MDC Wolfson Campus and the Wolfsonian Humanities Lab dedicated to organizing and preserving the historical assets and collectibles of FGO;
- a Social Entrepreneurship department focused on community outreach;
- the FGO Innovation Lab, using new technologies and cultural fusions to produce works in unconventional venues, including projects such as Opera + Reggae and an MMA Opera

Todardo's aggressive cost-cutting strategy combined with community outreach and audience engagement has been reported in The Miami Herald.
