= Sagwa =

Sagwa may refer to:

- Kim Sagwa (born 1984), South Korean writer
- Sagwa, neighbourhood of Grand Bay–Westfield, New Brunswick, Canada
- Sa-kwa (Korean: 사과, romanized: Sagwa), 2005 South Korean film
- Sagwa, the Chinese Siamese Cat (book), a 1994 children's book by Amy Tan
  - Sagwa, main title character of the 2000s television series Sagwa, the Chinese Siamese Cat, based on the book
- A character in the film Solo: A Star Wars Story
