= First Chinese Baptist Church of San Francisco =

First Chinese Baptist Church
- 三藩市第一華人浸信會
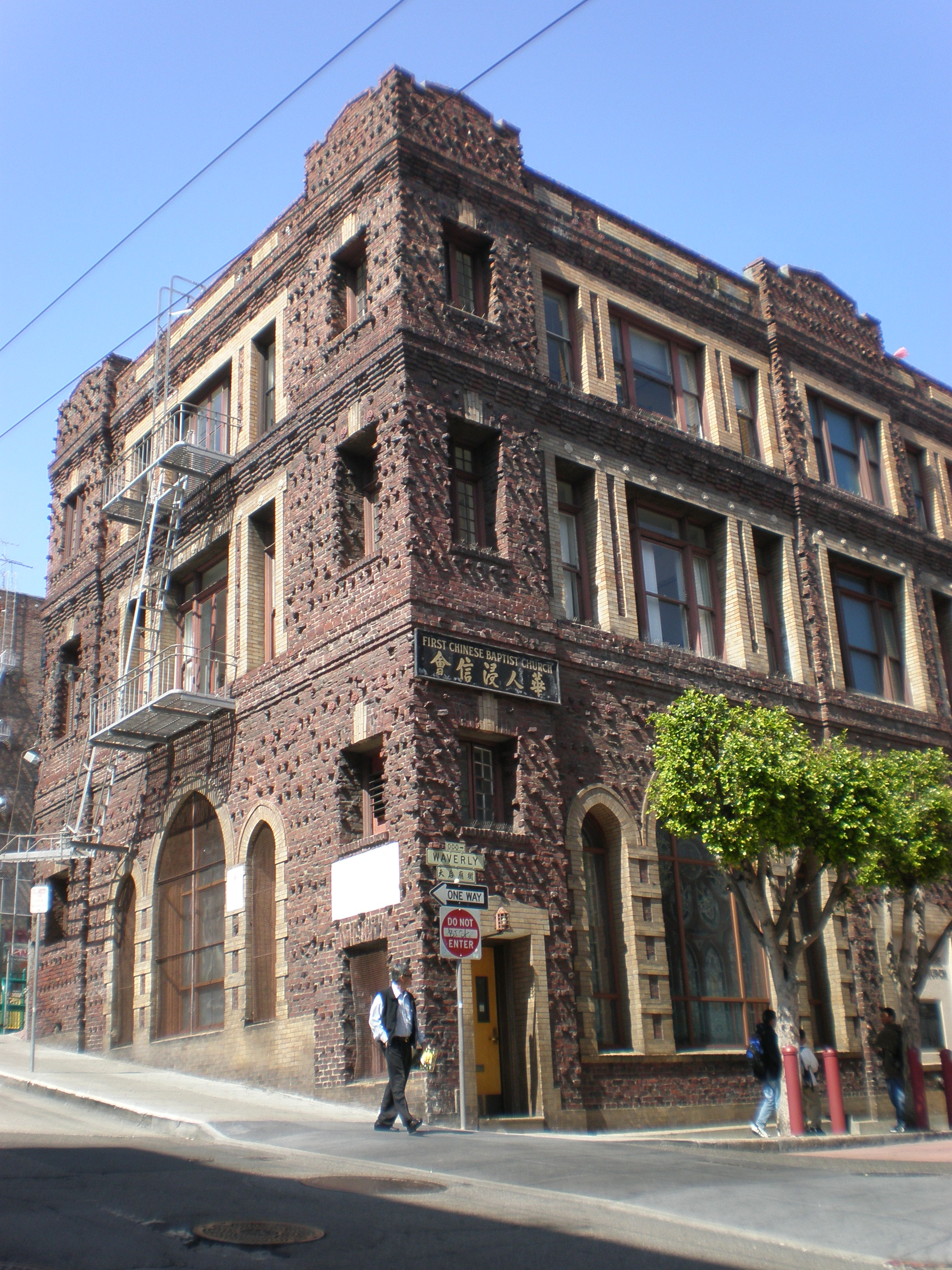
- The building seen from the streetcorner, with the church's name written in Cantonese

- Location within San Francisco Location within San Francisco Bay Area
- 37°47′36″N 122°24′25″W
- Location: San Francisco, California, United States
- Address: 15 Waverly Place
- Website: https://www.fcbc-sf.org/

History
- Founded: 1880

Architecture
- Completed: 1908 (rebuilt)

The First Chinese Baptist Church is a historic American Baptist church located in the Chinatown region of San Francisco. Founded in 1880 to serve recently immigrated Chinese-Americans, the church had a tumultuous early history due to two schisms, Sinophobia, and the destruction of the original building. In the modern era, the church serves both long-term residents and new generations of immigrants.

== History ==
=== Establishment ===
During the California Gold Rush, a large influx of Chinese immigrants came to California and established various diasporas in major cities. Several Protestant sects soon established churches in these areas, looking to reach the newly formed communities. The first Baptist effort to do so was led by J. B. Hartwell, a prolific missionary who spent several decades in China. After his return to the United States, Hartwell formed a Southern Baptist mission in San Francisco's Chinatown in 1880. The mission first operated out of a rented storefront before a permanent church controlled by the Home Mission Board was established in 1888 at the intersection of Waverly Place and Sacramento Street.

Concurrently, anti-Chinese and xenophobic sentiments grew in California and in the city. The movement's de facto head was mayor Isaac Kalloch, himself a powerful Baptist clergyman affiliated with the California Baptist Convention. Kalloch was accused of sensationalism and power grabbing both in church and government, culminating in an attempted impeachment and a schism within his convention. The First Chinese Baptist Church broke away with 13 other congregations to form a new convention, which Kalloch accused of being "Chinese" and opposing him for his, "hostility to the Chinese invasion of this coast". The church then became associated with the Northern Baptists.

=== Later history ===
The church building was completely destroyed by fire during the 1906 San Francisco earthquake, forcing the congregation to relocate to Oakland as a new church was built. A new building was rebuilt in 1908 at the same location, reusing bricks from the old.

The church's community slowly decreased over the early 20th century due to the long-term effects of the Chinese Exclusion Act and other efforts to limit Chinese immigration to the United States. These efforts saw the church unable to sustain itself, forcing it to rely on the Home Mission Board. This reliance alienated some members of the congregation, which led to a schism in 1906 and the establishment of the Chinese Independent Baptist Church, which consisted of those who favored greater autonomy from the board.

Following the Second World War, better economic mobility for Chinese-Americans and less Sinophobia allowed the congregation to rebound, which allowed the congregation to become self-sufficient and gain independence from the Home Mission Board in 1955. More recently, the church has adapted to a new wave of Chinese-American immigration and offers services in both English and Cantonese as it serves the local community. The approach had led to several groups breaking from the church and focusing on their own specific communities, such as Cantonese or English-only churches and services.

== Architecture ==
The three-story building at 15 Waverly Place is built of plain, brown, visually rough clinker brick that contrasts with the pagodas, colorful facades, and other Chinese architectural styles seen throughout Chinatown.

== In fiction ==
The Church is regularly featured in works by Chinese-American novelist Amy Tan, including The Joy Luck Club and The Kitchen God's Wife. In the former of the two, the church is where several of the core characters meet in America after immigrating from China and where they are taught English and given vital assistance to get situated to life in the United States. One character is named after the church's address in an attempt to Americanize herself in lieu of a Chinese-sounding name.

== See also ==
- Presbyterian Church in Chinatown, oldest Chinese-American church in North America
- First Colored Baptist Church, San Francisco's oldest African-American church
