= The Bonesetter's Daughter =

2001 novel by Amy Tan

- First edition cover
- Author: Amy Tan
- Language: English
- Publisher: Random House, Inc.
- Publication date: February 19, 2001
- Publication place: United States
- Media type: Print (hardback & paperback) & Audio CD
- Pages: 400 pp
- ISBN: 0-399-14685-7
- OCLC: 44883576
- Dewey Decimal: 813/.54 21
- LC Class: PS3570.A48 B6 2001

The Bonesetter's Daughter, published in 2001, is Amy Tan's fourth novel. Like much of Tan's work, this book deals with the relationship between an American-born Chinese woman and her immigrant mother.

The Bonesetter's Daughter is divided into two major stories. The first is about Ruth, a Chinese-American woman living in San Francisco. She worries that her elderly mother, Lu Ling, is gradually becoming more and more demented. Lu Ling seems increasingly forgetful, and makes bizarre comments about her family and her own past.

The second major story is that of Lu Ling herself, as written for Ruth. Several years earlier, Lu Ling had written out her life story in Chinese. Ruth arranges to have the document translated, and learns the truth about her mother's life in China.

Much of the novel, like Tan's previous work, is based on her relationship with her own mother, and her mother and grandmother's life stories. The first edition's cover photo is an image of Tan's grandmother Gu Jingmei, taken in about 1905.

== Plot summary ==
Ruth is a self-sufficient woman who makes her living as a ghostwriter for self-help books. She lives with her boyfriend, Art Kamen, and acts as a stepmother to Art's two teenage daughters, Dory and Fia. Meanwhile, as Lu Ling is showing signs of dementia, Ruth struggles to juggle her mother's illness, her job, and her relationship. As an adult, Ruth struggles to understand her mother and her strange behavior during Ruth's childhood. Although she loves her mother, she also resents her for having criticized her harshly when she was young and forcing her to obey strict rules. Lu Ling believed that young Ruth had the ability to communicate with the spirit world, and often expected her to produce messages from the ghost of Lu Ling's long-dead nursemaid, Precious Auntie, by writing on a sand tray.

Lu Ling's autobiography makes up the middle section of this book. This story within a story describes Lu Ling's early life in a small Chinese village called Immortal Heart. Lu Ling is raised by a mute, burned nursemaid called "Precious Auntie." It is later revealed that Precious Auntie sustained her injuries by swallowing burning ink resin. Although the oldest daughter in her family, Lu Ling is ignored by her mother in favor of her younger sister Gao Ling. However, Precious Auntie was entirely devoted to caring for Lu Ling.

Lu Ling's story goes further back, describing Precious Auntie's childhood as the daughter of a local bonesetter. The teenaged Precious Auntie is the only person who knows the location of a hidden cave where many ancient "dragon bones" can be found, knowledge that she retains even after being burned and coming to live with Lu Ling's family. After the discovery of the Peking Man, fossilized bones and information about where they might be found becomes extremely valuable. A local family, the Changs, wish to arrange a marriage between Lu Ling and their son Fu Nan because they believe that Lu Ling can lead them to the fossil cave. Lu Ling's family approves of the marriage, but Precious Auntie violently opposes it. Unable to speak in detail, she writes Lu Ling a long letter explaining her reasons, but Lu Ling does not read it to its end.

Only after Precious Auntie's death does Lu Ling learn that her nursemaid was actually her mother, and that the woman she had thought to be her mother is actually her father's sister. After Precious Auntie's death, Gao Ling marries Fu Nan and Lu Ling is sent away to a Christian orphanage where she completes her education, grows up and becomes a teacher. Here, she meets her first husband, Pan Kai Jing. Lu Ling lives in the orphanage as a teacher through World War II, often going to extreme lengths to protect the students from the Japanese soldiers and other dangers. A few years later, she is reunited with Gao Ling. The two "sisters" immigrate to America separately and marry a pair of brothers, Edmund and Edwin. Lu Ling's second husband dies from a hit and run accident when Ruth is just two years old.

Ruth struggles growing up as the child of a single parent who believes in curses and ghosts. Once Ruth learns the details of her mother's past, she gains a new understanding of her and her seemingly erratic behavior. Answers to both women's problems unfold as Lu Ling's story is finally revealed in its entirety.

== Opera ==
The novel was made into an opera that premiered at San Francisco's War Memorial Opera House and was performed by the San Francisco Opera on September 13, 2008. The opera was composed by Stewart Wallace, and the libretto penned by Amy Tan. The opera condenses the novel's plot through various devices: it omits peripheral characters and the subplot about the Christian orphanage and expands Chang the Coffin Maker into the key villain. He rapes Precious Auntie after killing her father, the Bonesetter, and unknowingly fathers Lu Ling. The score folds traditional Chinese brass and percussion into a Western orchestra, with Chinese classical musicians led by Wu Tong and Li Zhonghua performing at the premiere. The suona, a raucous reed horn, features in the orchestration and is played onstage several times. The character of Precious Auntie sings and moves in the kunju style of Chinese Opera and was created and enacted by kunju star Qian Yi at the premiere. The other members of the premiere cast included mezzo-soprano Zheng Cao singing the dual roles of Ruth and the youthful Liu Ling, mezzo-soprano Ning Liang as Old Lu Ling, bass Hao Jiang Tian as Chang, folk/pop vocalist and suona player Wu Tong as the Taoist priest, baritone James Maddalena as Ruth's husband, Art Kamen, mezzo-soprano Catherine Cook as Art's mother Arlene Kamen and as Madame Wang in the flashback to Immortal Heart village, bass-baritone Valery Portnov as Art's father, Marty Kamen, with 14-year-old Madelaine Matej and 17-year-old Rose Frazier, respectively, playing Art's teen daughters, Dory and Fia Kamen. Chang's wives were played by Mary Finch, Natasha Ramirez Leland, and Erin Neff. The Dalian Acrobatic Troupe performed aerial and floor stunts and played numerous supernumerary roles alongside the San Francisco Opera Chorus. The premiere was directed by Chen Shi-Zheng and conducted by Steven Sloane.

== Stage Play ==
An adaptation of the book debuted in Seattle, WA on June 10, 2022, when Book-It Repertory Theatre produced a world premiere. Adapted by Desdemona Chiang, it was directed by Rosa Joshi. The ensemble of strong actors included Desieree Me Jung (Lu Ling), Khanh Doan (Precious Auntie), Sunam Ellis (Ruth), Coco Justino (The Bonesetter's Daughter), Mona Leach (Gao Ling), Mara Palma (Lu Ling's "mother"), Nabilah Ahmed (Kai Jing) and Kathy Hsieh (many women).
