= Fish Cheeks =

1987 short story by Amy Tan

"Fish Cheeks" is a 1987 one-page memoir (short story) by Chinese-American author Amy Tan and her first published essay. The work was first published in Seventeen and covers a Christmas Eve dinner when Tan was 14 years old. It was subsequently published as a part of The Opposite of Fate: A Book of Musings.

The work has been used in Common Core classes and features themes of acceptance of differences, growing up, family, heritage, and cultural differences. It typically is used for seventh grade and eighth-grade classes. The work has been compared to a similar work by American chef and author Gabrielle Hamilton, "Killing Dinner".

== Summary ==
As the plot in "Fish Cheeks" progresses, new characters and problems arise that the main character, Amy, struggles to handle. During the exposition, the author reveals that she is a young Chinese girl. The narrative takes place on Christmas Eve, when she was 14 years old. Her Chinese family had invited American friends, a minister's family including a boy Tan has a crush on, for a traditional Chinese dinner. At this point in the story her name is not yet mentioned. She becomes upset when she learns the news because she is afraid of what his white American family will think of their Chinese Christmas. When the action of the story starts to rise and her mother begins to prepare for the dinner, Amy's worries continue to grow and all of the usual foods that her family makes become foreign as the kitchen is filled with appalling mounds of raw food.

When the story reaches its climax, both of the families are eating dinner and Amy has lost all hope. Her family acts different and doesn't show the same manners as Robert's family. Her father pulls the tender fish cheek from the fish and offers it to Amy because it is her favorite and this caused her to want to vanish from the dinner. As the Christmas dinner goes on she feels more ashamed and doesn't know what to do. Amy is embarrassed by her family and by the food (including fish cheeks) served to the guests, and again by her father's belching after dinner, although he explains that it's a polite Chinese custom that shows satisfaction. Once the night is over she is in silence and not sure what to even say. After their guests leave, Tan talks with her mother, who tells her, "[the] only shame is to have shame" and that she should have pride in her own heritage. It is not until later that she realizes how special that meal was for her. She resolves all the hard feelings when she realizes that all the foods that were made for that meal were her favorite and she should have enjoyed the meal instead of worrying so much about the guests.

As the plot in the story moves on it reveals how Amy feels worse and worse about the dinner. She is deeply embarrassed of how different she is in her traditions compared to her crush and his family. When Tan ends the story she shows how little that dinner actually meant to her later in life. The internal conflict that she had, went away and the story ends with her finding peace about the situation.
