= The Joy Luck Club =

The Joy Luck Club may refer to:

- The Joy Luck Club (novel), a 1989 novel written by Amy Tan
- The Joy Luck Club (film), a 1993 film adaptation of the above novel
