= Palace Theatre (Manchester, New Hampshire) =

- Athens Building
- U.S. National Register of Historic Places
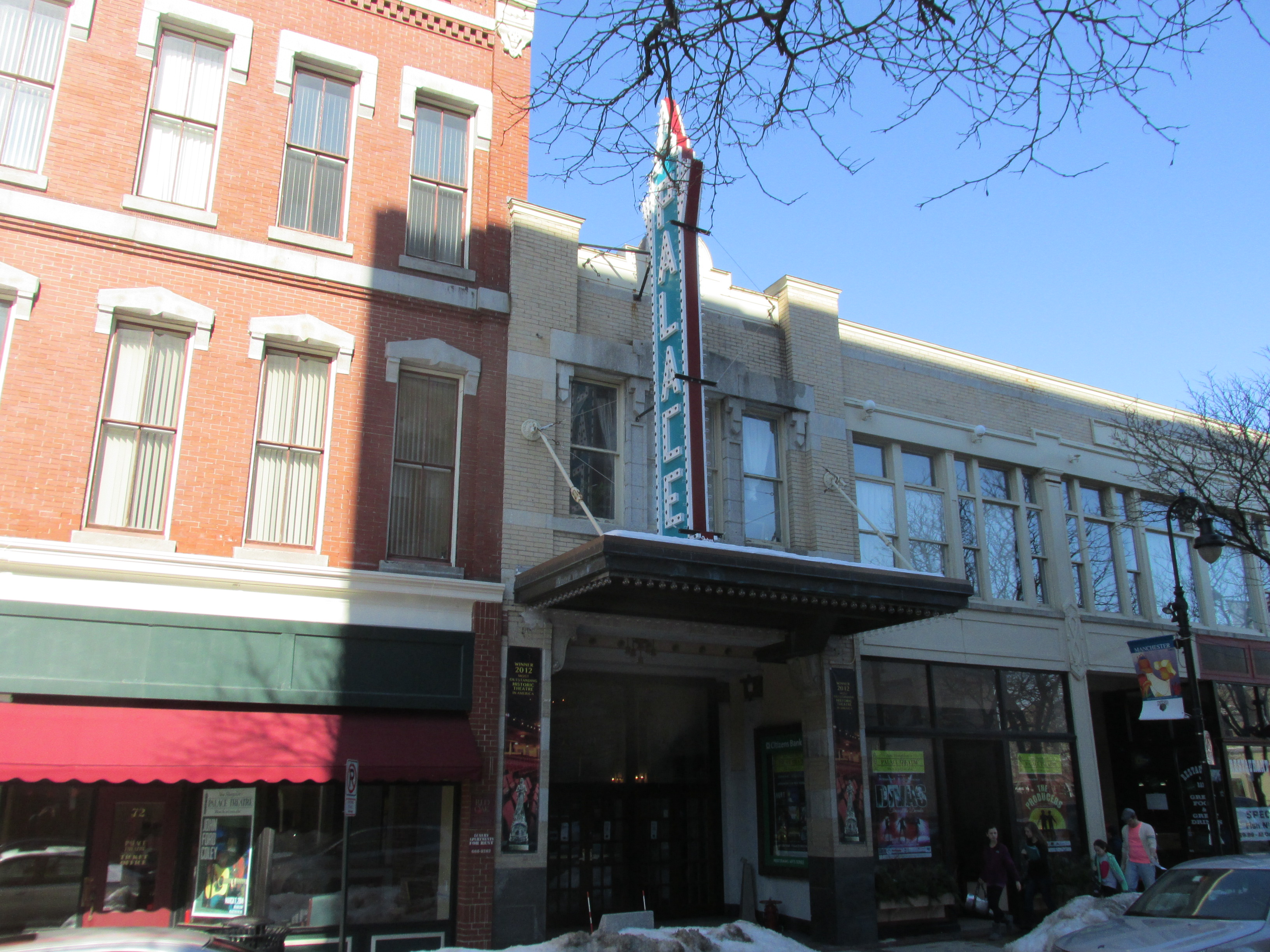
- The Palace Theatre in 2014

- Location within New Hampshire Location within the United States
- Location: 76-96 Hanover St., Manchester, New Hampshire
- Coordinates: 42°59′28″N 71°27′42″W
- Area: 0.5 acres (0.20 ha)
- Built: 1914
- Architect: Leon Lempert & Son
- NRHP reference No.: 75000123
- Added to NRHP: May 30, 1975

The Palace Theatre is a stage production venue at 76-96 Hanover Street in Manchester, New Hampshire, United States. Built in 1914, the theatre was listed on the National Register of Historic Places as the Athens Building.

== History ==
=== The start ===
In June 1914, Greek immigrant Victor Charas with the help of general contractor Henry Macropol and architect Leon Lempert & Son began construction on the theatre. It was fashioned after its namesake in New York City, to which it is remarkably similar. Construction was completed in under a year. At the time, the theatre was dubbed as "the only first-class theatre in New Hampshire that was fireproof and air-conditioned." (The air-conditioning was provided by fans which blew air over large blocks of ice under the stage.) The Palace Theatre opened on April 9, 1915. Local press billed the evening as the grandest social occasion of the century and the musical comedy Modern Eve played to a full house. With their bright marquee lights, collectively the theatres of the downtown Manchester were referred to as The Great White Way.

Up to 1930 the Palace had touring vaudeville companies regularly on its stage, with famous performers of the day, including Jimmy Durante, Bob Hope, Harry Houdini, The Marx Brothers, and Red Skelton. Stock companies, such as The Palace players had up to a dozen performances a week.

=== The decline ===
Vaudeville began to lose public favor toward the end of the 1920s, as silent pictures and talkies drew crowds to the silver screen. The Palace struggled to stay in business, so it adapted and became primarily a movie house from 1930 until the early-1960s.

By the late 1960s, the Palace Theatre was no longer in use for staging productions. Instead it was used as classroom space for New Hampshire College (now Southern New Hampshire University). When the school moved to its new campus, the Palace became vacant, and fell into disrepair. Eventually, the seats were removed, the stage equipment was abandoned, and the building was used as a warehouse.

=== Rebirth ===
In 1973, two young impresarios - Jon Ogden and Rebecca Gould discovered that Manchester lawyer John McLane had prevailed upon the Norwin S. and Elizabeth N. Bean Foundation to take an option on the Palace in hopes of finding a way to keep it from being sold and torn down. The Bean Foundation funded a feasibility study headed by Ogden and Gould and then agreed to provide $500,000 for the renovation of the theatre. McLane and Gould spearheaded a campaign to provide operating funds for the Palace while Ogden served as the general contractor for the renovation process. On November 2, 1974, the Palace Theatre reopened with its new facade, lighting system, backstage furnishings and new orchestra seating. (Ogden and his staff were still installing the last few seats one half-hour before the building officially opened.) Mayor Sylvio Dupuis, a member of the Board of Directors of the newly formed New Hampshire Performing Arts Center, served as emcee at the opening night ceremonies. Ogden became the executive director of the non-profit performing arts organization and Gould became its public relations director.

The theatre building was listed on the National Register of Historic Places as the "Athens Building" in 1975.

Early in 1980, Ogden and Gould resigned from their positions of leadership. A new board of directors under the direction of McLane, cut the budget for the Palace drastically. In December 1980, the sprinkler system was allowed to freeze during a cold snap. When temperatures rose, failed plumbing caused 70,000 gallons of water to pour down the balcony, over the rail, and into the theatre. In 1984, a fire on Hanover Street destroyed much of the block. The firewall of the Palace Theatre's original design saved it and the rest of the buildings on the street beyond it.

== Today ==
The theatre building has two main sections. Facing Hanover Street is a two-story brick-and-stone structure with a pressed-metal facade containing five store fronts, of which the westernmost houses the lobby of the theatre. The auditorium is in a multi-story structure rising behind the first one. The auditorium measures about 72'6" by 59'8". It originally had a seating capacity of 1,100; after its restoration, it has a capacity of 880.
