= The Bonesetter's Daughter (opera) =

Opera by Stewart Wallace

The Bonesetter's Daughter is an opera in a prologue and two acts by Stewart Wallace to a libretto by Amy Tan based on her novel of the same name. It premiered on 13 September 2008 at the War Memorial Opera House of San Francisco Opera, which commissioned the work.

== Roles ==
Role	Voice type	Premiere cast, 13 September 2008 Conductor: Steven Sloane
Ruth Young Kamen; LuLing as a young woman	mezzo-soprano	Zheng Cao
LuLing Liu Young	mezzo-soprano	Ning Liang
Precious Auntie	Kunju mezzo	Qian Yi
Chang the Coffin Maker	bass	Hao Jiang Tian
Taoist Priest; Chef	Chinese folk/pop tenor	Wu Tong
Art Kamen	baritone	James Maddalena
Arlene Kamen	mezzo-soprano	Catherine Cook
Marty Kamen	bass-baritone	Valery Portnov
Dory Kamen	girl soprano	Madelaine Matej
Fia Kamen	girl soprano	Rose Frazier
Chang's first wife	soprano	Mary Finch
Chang's second wife	mezzo-soprano	Natasha Ramirez Leland
Chang's third wife	mezzo-soprano	Erin Neff
Acrobats		Dalian Acrobatic Troupe
Suona		Wu Tong, Zuo Jicheng
Chinese percussionists		Li Zhonghua, Ma Li, Nie Haijun, Jin Liang
Director		Chen Shi-Zheng
Set designer		Walt Spangler
Costume designer		Han Feng
Lighting designer		Scott Zielinski
Video designer		Leigh Haas
Sound designer		Mark Grey
Choreographer		Wang Yuqing
Aerial choreographer		Ruthy Inchaustegui
Approximate running time: 2 hours, 40 minutes including one intermission

== Plot ==
Book cover of Amy Tan's novel

The Bonesetter's Daughter traces a Chinese-American woman's search for her own voice and identity as she grapples with her elderly mother's apparent dementia, her husband's ambivalent commitment, and her teen stepdaughters' hurtful self-absorption. Guided by a ghost of uncertain identity, she travels into the past and lives out portions of her mother's tragic youth, gaining insight, forgiveness, and strength.

The opera is set both in 1997 San Francisco, and in China and Hong Kong around the outbreak of World War II.

Shifting times and locales are linked by a recurring trio of women: American-born Ruth, a professional ghostwriter who scarcely speaks up for herself; her mother, LuLing, who appears both as a querulous old woman and as a selfish adolescent; and LuLing's childhood caretaker known as Precious Auntie, who appears both as a ghost and as the fiery young mother she once was.

=== Scenes ===
- Prologue — Dragon Dance – A timeless void
- Act 1, scene 1 – Fountain Court Restaurant, San Francisco, 1997
- Act 1, scene 2 – Immortal Heart, a village outside Beijing, 1930s
- Act 2, scene 1 – Hong Kong Harbor, 1940s
- Act 2, scene 2 – A hospital room, San Francisco, 1997

For further details, see The Bonesetter's Daughter.

== Analysis ==
The score folds authentic Chinese musical expression into an essentially Western idiom, just as the libretto incorporates Chinese themes—such as the importance of family, and the power of ghosts and lucky charms—within an American framework. That framework includes many popular references, including a wry jab at "Medicare-approved" nursing homes and reference to Ruth's profession as a ghostwriter, which her immigrant mother misconstrues literally to mean a transcriptionist for ghosts. Notably, the infamous O. J. Simpson murder trial of 1995 becomes the vehicle by which elderly LuLing remembers and narrates traumatic events from her adolescence in China, which are revealed as the crux of her conflicts with her daughter.
