= Saving Fish from Drowning =

2005 novel by Amy Tan

- First edition
- Author: Amy Tan
- Language: English
- Publisher: G. P. Putnam's Sons
- Publication date: 2005
- Publication place: United States
- Media type: Print (hardback & paperback)
- Pages: 474 pp
- ISBN: 0-399-15301-2

Saving Fish from Drowning is a 2005 novel written by Amy Tan. It is her fifth work. The book is about 12 American tourists who travel to China and Burma.

The novel received an honorable mention from the Asian/Pacific American Awards for Literature.

== Inspiration ==
Tan says in her "Note to the Reader" that she drew inspiration for her work from a collection of "automatic writing... messages from the unseen world". However, in an interview, she recants this explanation and claims that she actually made up the story of Bibi Chen, the protagonist whose story was supposedly passed along through automatic writing.

== Plot summary ==
The story concerns a group of American tourists travelling the Burma Road from China to Myanmar, and the comic confusions that occur when they are kidnapped by a group of Karen people who believe one of the American teenagers to be a prophesied savior. The Americans, for their part, are not even aware that they are being kidnapped.

The story is told through the omniscient first person narrative of Bibi Chen, the tour leader who unexpectedly dies before the trip takes place and who continues to watch over her friends as they journey towards their fate.

The novel explores the hidden strengths of the tourists, set in the uneasy political situation in Burma.
