= The Kitchen God's Wife =

1991 novel by Amy Tan

- First edition
- Author: Amy Tan
- Language: English
- Publisher: G. P. Putnam's Sons
- Publication date: 1991
- Publication place: United States
- Media type: Print (Hardcover, Paperback), Audiobook (Cassette, CD)
- Pages: 415 (1st edition)
- ISBN: 978-0-399-13578-1
- OCLC: 23144220

The Kitchen God's Wife is the second novel by Chinese-American author Amy Tan. First published in 1991, it deals extensively with Chinese-American female identity and draws on the story of her mother's life.

== Context ==
Amy Tan was born in Oakland, California, to Chinese immigrant parents. She has described her childhood as difficult and found it hard to fit in, not feeling she conformed to either ethnic identity. Much of Tan's work draws on the lives of her family and her work is often considered to be to some extent autobiographical. The Kitchen God's Wife's story mirrors Tan's own: the tale of Pearl, the California-born daughter of Winnie, a Chinese immigrant who fled to America to escape an abusive traditional marriage and the turmoil of war. In a 1991 interview with Katie Couric, for NBC, Tan described her connection to Pearl:

[We] are actually similar in some ways. I was a speech and language specialist, just as Pearl was. And my father died when I was 15. But the most striking similarity ... is our ignorance of our mothers' past. And ... for, many, many years I didn't know anything about her life, about the abusive marriage and the children she had lost.

The Kitchen God's Wife is set largely in early 90s California and in China during World War II. San Francisco, the primary location used in the early chapters of the novel, has a significant Chinese-American population, (Note: At the time of the 2010 census, 172,181 Chinese Americans were living in San Francisco. At 21.4% of its total population, it has the highest ratio of Chinese-Americans of any US city.) with a significant proportion having moved during and following World War II, as Pearl's mother did, when restrictions on numbers were relaxed. The second part of the novel takes place in the lead-up to and during World War II, focusing on the lives of Chinese women under the Japanese occupation of China and the brutality inflicted on them by the occupying forces.

== Plot summary ==
The novel opens with the narrative voice of Pearl Louie Brandt, the American-born daughter of a Chinese mother and a Chinese-American father, living in San Jose, California. Pearl's mother, Winnie Louie, has called her to request that she and her family come to San Francisco, to attend the engagement party of Bao-Bao, her cousin. Later, Pearl receives another call from her mother telling her that her elderly Auntie Du has died, with her funeral being arranged for the day following Bao-Bao's party.

Upon her arrival in San Francisco, her Auntie Helen makes a demand: she insists that Pearl must tell Winnie, that she has multiple sclerosis, something which everyone else in the family knows; Helen claims that she is suffering from a malignant brain tumor and does not want to die knowing that Winnie is unaware of her daughter's illness. Helen adds that if Pearl will not tell the truth, she will do it herself. Afterwards, Helen has a similar conversation with Winnie, telling her that she must reveal the truth of her past to Pearl.

At this point the novel switches to the narrative voice of Winnie Louie, telling the story of her past. Before reaching the United States, Winnie experienced a life of turmoil and suffering: she was abandoned by her mother, a lesser wife of her father, as a young child, and did not fully understand her mother's mysterious disappearance. She was forced to live with her uncle and his two wives, never feeling as loved as her uncle's daughter, Peanut. Nevertheless, when the time came, Winnie's aunts arranged a traditional marriage for her, and her father provided a large dowry, since he was an educated and well-established man.

The marriage to Wen Fu, who first courted Peanut but transferred his attentions to Winnie when he learned of her father's wealth, turned out to be a disaster. Winnie suffered physical and mental abuse at the hands of her husband, losing many children along the way. Throughout her marriage, Winnie does many things behind the scenes that her husband takes credit for, and she likens her situation to a Chinese fable about a man who was horrible to his wife no matter how much she did for him, and yet still became known as "the Kitchen God".

It was during the war that Winnie met Jimmy Louie, Pearl's father; He was a good husband, a good father, and a minister in the Chinese Baptist Church, but he died when Pearl was a teenager, a time when Pearl became very angry. Winnie explains to Pearl that she met Jimmy Louie in China, at an American military dance. The two fell in love and he began to help her escape her abusive marriage. In order to gain a divorce, the paper has to be signed by two witnesses and Grand Auntie Du and Helen agreed to sign. Wen-Fu had previously ripped up the papers from her first attempt, and Winnie went to him again to get the papers signed. At this second meeting Wen Fu raped her. Winnie explains that she has always tried to love Pearl more because she thought she might have been Wen-Fu's daughter.

After Winnie tells her story, Pearl reveals the secret of her disease. By the time the wedding of Bao-Bao comes around, mother and daughter have come to know each other better. Winnie goes into a local shop and finds an altar with an unnamed goddess. The shopkeeper gives it to her for half price because it is considered bad luck. Winnie names it "Lady Sorrowfree" the wife of the Kitchen God, who has endured all, received no credit for the work she has done, and is still strong. At the end of the novel, Helen reveals that she is planning a trip to China, with Pearl, and Winnie.

== Title ==
The title is a reference to the forgotten wife of Zao Jun, or the Kitchen God, a figure whose story is similar to that of the novel's co-protagonist, Winnie. Zao Jun was once a hardworking farmer who married a virtuous and kind woman, Guo, but later squandered all their money. When his wife left him, Zao turned to begging. Chancing upon his wife whilst begging, he is wracked by guilt and throws himself into the fire as recompense. As a reward for his courage in admitting his wrongdoing, the Jade Emperor made him into a god. Tan equates Zao to Wen Fu and Winnie to the mistreated and forgotten wife.

== Themes ==
The Kitchen God's Wife contains a number of themes evident in Tan's earlier novel The Joy Luck Club. A principal theme is the struggle of females in a patriarchal society. Guiyou Huang, says that "the novel zooms in on women's issues by exploring relationships with males ... while depicting an assiduous quest for a female divinity that represents the female subjectivity." A second theme is the issues faced by immigrants and their children. Tan explores the additional strains placed on the relationship between an immigrant mother and an American-born daughter, and the consequences this has on how their lives develop.

== Reception ==
The Kitchen God's Wife was published by G. P. Putnam's Sons in 1991. The novel was well accepted internationally, reaching The New York Times Best Seller list in the first month of its publication, remaining there for a total of thirty eight weeks. The book went on to be included on several best sellers lists in Australia, England, Canada, Denmark, Spain and Germany.

The book has been compared to works by several seminal and well known authors. The New York Times described the book as "remarkable ... mesmerising ... compelling ... An entire world unfolds in a Tolstoyan tide of event and detail", and American author Mary Ellen Snodgrass called the book a "Chinese Gone With the Wind".

Some critics, such as King-Kok Cheung, have criticised Tan for her characterization of Asian men as one-sided and the "epitome of deception and cruelty". Additionally, Frank Chin has described the book's central image of the forgotten wife as invented by Tan, given that the kitchen god is a regional deity and not a major figure in Chinese mythology, and that the wife is not ignored, but honored by being depicted in images next to the kitchen god.

== Film adaptation ==
After the success of the 1993 film The Joy Luck Club, based on Amy Tan's first novel of the same name, Disney Studios contacted Tan to discuss making her second book, Kitchen God's Wife, into a film; however, negotiations fell through. In the waning of the glow of The Joy Luck Club, further Asian-American stories were mostly shot down by studios after the brief rush following the film.

== Sources ==
- Becnel, Kim (2010). Bloom's How to Write About Amy Tan. NY, USA: Infobase Publishing, 2009. ISBN 9781604133080.
- Cheung, King-Kok (1998). "Of Men and Men: Reconstructing Chinese American Masculinity". In Kumamto Stanely, Sandra (ed.). Other Sisterhoods: Literary Theory and U.S. Women of Color. IL, USA: University of Illinois. ISBN 9780252066665.
- Dong, Lan (2009). Reading Amy Tan. CA, USA: The Pop Lit Book Club. ISBN 9780313355479.
- Huang, Guiyou (2005). "Long a Mystery and Forever a Memory: God vs. Goddess in the Ethnic Novel". In Huang, Guiyou (ed.). Asian American Literary Studies. Introduction to Ethnic Studies. Edinburgh, UK: Edinburgh University Press. ISBN 9780748620135.
- Mussari, Mark (2011). Today's Writers and Their Works: Amy Tan. NY, USA: Marshall Cavdendish Corporation. ISBN 9780761441274.
- Muaddi Darraj, Susan (2007). Amy Tan. Asian Americans of Achievement. NY, USA: Infobase Publishing. ISBN 9780791092699.
- "Race Reporting for the Asian Population by Selected Categories: 2010". U.S. Census Bureau.
- "Tan: "The Kitchen God's Wife". NBC Today Show (Interview). Interviewed by Katie Couric. June 17, 1991.
- Wong, Sau-Ling Cynthia (2002). ""Sugar Sisterhood": Situating the Amy Tan Phenomenon". In Bloom, Harold (ed.). Amy Tan's The Joy Luck Club. Bloom's Modern Critical Interpretations. NY, USA: Chelsea House. ISBN 9780791063385.
