= The Valley of Amazement =

2013 novel by Amy Tan

- First edition
- Author: Amy Tan
- Genre: Historical fiction
- Publisher: HarperCollins Publishers
- Publication date: 11/5/2013
- Pages: 608
- ISBN: 978-0062107312

The Valley of Amazement is a novel by Amy Tan. Like many of her works, it deals with mother-daughter relationship and is partly set in historical China. An excerpt from the novel was published independently as Rules for Virgins.

== Plot summary ==
In the first part of the story, Violet tells the story of growing up in Hidden Jade Path, a courtesan house in Shanghai that is run by her mother, an American woman named Lulu Minturn. Violet grows up unaware of who her father is and unsure of her mother's feelings for her.

When the Qing dynasty falls in 1912, mother and daughter are separated and the young girl is sold to a rivaling courtesan house, where she is educated by an older girl, Magic Gourd, formerly of her mother's house. The two form a lifelong relationship through Violet's marriages to former clients. Her first marriage results in a child, Flora, who is taken from Violet as a result of an unlawful marriage.

The second part of the story is told by the mother, who thinks the daughter is dead. She recalls her upbringing by remote parents in the US, her runaway with an unknown Chinese painter, and her struggle to be accepted as the mother of their two children.

Violet is eventually reunited with her mother, and eventually also her daughter Flora.
