= The Hundred Secret Senses =

1995 novel by Amy Tan

- First edition cover
- Author: Amy Tan
- Genre: Novel
- Publisher: G. P. Putnum's Sons
- Publication date: 17 October 1995 (1st edition)
- Publication place: United States
- Media type: Print (Hardcover, Paperback)
- Pages: 358 pp. (1st edition)
- ISBN: 0-399-14114-6 (1st edition)
- OCLC: 32894903
- Dewey Decimal: 813/.54 20
- LC Class: PS3570.A48 H86 1995

The Hundred Secret Senses is a bestselling 1995 novel by Chinese-American writer Amy Tan. It was published by Putnam, and was shortlisted for the 1996 Orange Prize for Fiction. While the story is fictional, it is based on the experiences of Tan and on stories told by her mother.

== Plot summary ==
The story focuses on the relationship between Chinese-born Kwan and her younger, Chinese-American sister Olivia, who serves as the book's primary narrator. Olivia and Kwan's relationship begins when their father dies and Kwan is sent to live with the family. Olivia is embarrassed by Kwan because she is unfamiliar with American customs and does not speak English well. She constantly makes a fool of herself, and Olivia is teased by peers for having a "retarded" sister.

Kwan relates to Olivia through the telling of Chinese tales and superstitions. She believes she has "Yin eyes", which means that she can see ghosts. She converses with them at night, frightening Olivia. She speaks Chinese in private, and Olivia picks up the language. Kwan believes that her stories are not just stories; they are based on her belief that she is part of the Yin world, the world of the ghosts. She believes that she is recounting tales from her past lives. In the melding of Olivia's modern Western world and Kwan's yin world, Olivia and Kwan create Asian-American identities for themselves, individually and together.

Kwan plans a trip to China which is actually a scheme to get Olivia and her estranged husband, Simon, back together. Now Kwan serves as the translator for the writer (Simon) and photographer (Olivia). The real purpose of the trip is to discover Olivia and Kwan's connection to the Yin world.

Kwan makes Olivia come to see that besides what we understand through our five senses, there are many things that can only be understood by using the "hundred secret senses". This story is about the journey of identity, family history, past lives, and ultimately, love.
