= James Maddalena =

American baritone (born 1954)

James Maddalena (born 1954) is an American baritone who is chiefly associated with contemporary American opera. He gained international recognition in 1987 when he originated the role of Richard Nixon at the premiere of John Adams's opera Nixon in China at Houston Grand Opera. He has since reprised the role on many occasions, and recorded it for the Nonesuch Records release of the opera in 1987. In addition to Maddelena's role as Nixon, he has originated two other Adams characters: the Captain in The Death of Klinghoffer and Jack Hubbard in Doctor Atomic. He has also performed roles in the premieres of operas by Paul Moravec and Stewart Wallace among other American composers.

In addition to American opera, Maddalena has sung a broad operatic repertoire which ranges from Monteverdi, Handel, Mozart, and Verdi to modern composers like Benjamin Britten and Michael Tippett. He is also a concert artist whose regular performances include works by Bach, Handel and Schubert as well as those by modern composers.

== Early life and career ==
Maddalena was born in Lynn, Massachusetts, in 1954. He was trained at the New England Conservatory (NEC), and while a student there made his professional singing debut with the Boston Pops Orchestra in 1974. He became a member of Emmanuel Music while an NEC student, with whom he performed all of Bach's cantatas under conductor Craig Smith. In 1976 he co-founded the Liederkreis Ensemble, whose members included a quartet of vocalists with Smith as pianist. The ensemble was dedicated to performing lieder, particularly rarely heard works, and was awarded the Naumburg Award in 1980. He also actively performed with other music ensembles in New England during the 1970s, including singing in the world premiere of Robert Schumann's Requiem with the New Hampshire Sinfonietta (1975) and performances of Harrison Birtwistle's Down by the Greenwood Side with Boston Musica Viva (1978).

Maddalena made his first forray into opera as Mr. Gedge in a student production of Benjamin Britten's Albert Herring at the NEC in March 1975. In the summers of 1975, 1976, and 1977 he performed with the Wolf Trap Opera Company, a prestigious program for young opera singers at the Wolf Trap National Park for the Performing Arts. His professional opera debut was made in February 1977 with the Boston Lyric Opera (BLO) during that company's first season as Allazim in Wolfgang Amadeus Mozart's Zaide. He later returned to the BLO several more times during his career, performing such roles as John Sorel in Gian Carlo Menotti's The Consul (1981), Albert (1981) in Jules Massenet's Werther, the Music Master in Richard Strauss' Ariadne auf Naxos (1982), Somarone in Hector Berlioz's Béatrice et Bénédict (1993), Don Alfonso in Così fan tutte (2004), and Baron Duphol in La traviata (2006). In 1979 he starred in a production of George Frideric Handel's Atalanta at the American Repertory Theater under conductor Herbert von Karajan.

In 1980 Maddalena created the title role in Tony Schemmer's pop opera Phaust at Harvard University's Sanders Theatre, conducted by Philip Morehead. That same year he portrayed the role of Death in Gustav Holst's Savitri with Boston Cecilia. He sang as a soloist in several other performances with Boston Cecilia, including in concerts of Handel's Athalia (1982, Abner) and Johann Sebastian Bach's Mass in B minor (1983). In 1983 he performed the role of Abramane in the United States premiere of Jean-Philippe Rameau's Zoroastre with Boston Baroque (then known as Banchetto Musicale) at the Sanders Theatre, conducted by Martin Pearlman. He performed with the ensemble again in December 1984 as a soloist in Handel's Messiah for performances in both Boston and at New York City's Carnegie Hall.

== Working with Sellars and Adams ==
In September 1980 Maddalena portrayed the title role in a controversial production of Mozart's Don Giovanni at the Palace Theatre in Manchester, New Hampshire, with the New Hampshire Symphony Orchestra for the Monadnock Music Festival (MMF). The production used a modernized staging which was conceived by director Peter Sellars, just 23 years old at the time. It was the first professional opera directed by Sellars. While Opera News dubbed the production as "an act of artistic vandalism", The New York Times was more positive in its review, with critic Peter G. Davis hailing the staging as "remarkably stimulating and provocative" and stating that "Maddalena was an appropriately loathsome Don, and he sang the part with a fine, firmly modulated baritone."

The 1980 production of Don Giovanni marked the beginning of a long and fruitful artistic partnership between Sellars and Maddalena which continues to this day. In 1981 he sang the role of Idreno in the United States premiere of Joseph Haydn's Armida at the MMF in which Sellars staged the opera during the Vietnam War. Other roles Maddalena performed in Sellars' productions included Guglielmo in Così fan tutte (1984, Castle Hill Festival and 1986, Pepsico Summerfare,) Count Almaviva in The Marriage of Figaro (1984, MMF and 1988, Pepsico Summerfare,) and Achilla in Handel's Giulio Cesare (1987).

In 1987 Maddalena entered the annals of opera history when he created the role of President Richard Nixon at the premiere of John Adams's opera Nixon in China at the Houston Grand Opera. Directed and initially conceived by Sellars, the opera was belittled by many critics at its premiere. However, the opera's enduring popularity has since changed critical evaluation of the work, and it is now considered a classic. Maddalena, who physically resembles Nixon, has become closely associated with the part he created in the premiere. Soon after the Houston premiere, he performed the role at the Brooklyn Academy of Music, De Nederlandse Opera and the Washington National Opera. He has subsequently performed the role at the Edinburgh International Festival (1988), the Los Angeles Opera (1990), the Maison de la Culture di Bobigny, Paris (1991), the Frankfurt Opera (1992), the Adelaide Festival (1992), the English National Opera (2000 and 2006), and the Greek National Opera (2007) among others. He sang Nixon for his debut at the Metropolitan Opera in 2011, and most recently performed the role with the Lyric Opera of Kansas City in March 2012.

Maddalena teamed up with Sellars again for performances in two more world premieres of operas by composer John Adams: creating the parts of the Captain in The Death of Klinghoffer (1991, La Monnaie) and Jack Hubbard in Doctor Atomic (2005, San Francisco Opera). He subsequently recorded the role of the Captain and sang that role in productions at the Brooklyn Academy of Music, the Opéra National de Lyon, the San Francisco Opera, and at the Vienna Festival.

== Other work ==
Maddalena has created roles in several other world premieres, including Hobson in David Carlson's The Midnight Angel (1993, Opera Theatre of Saint Louis), a variety of roles in Stewart Wallace's Harvey Milk (1995, Houston Grand Opera), Art Kamen in Wallace's The Bonesetter's Daughter (2008, San Francisco Opera), the title role in Kirke Mechem’s John Brown (2008, Lyric Opera of Kansas City), Howard Joyce in Paul Moravec's The Letter (2009, Santa Fe Opera), and Clotaldo in Lewis Spratlan’s Life is a Dream (2010, Santa Fe Opera). In 2001 he performed the role of Gideon March in Mark Adamo's Little Women in Houston, a performance which was broadcast live on PBS's Great Performances. In October 2010 he sang the role of Simon Powers in the premiere of Tod Machover's science fiction opera Death and the Powers at the Opéra de Monte-Carlo.

In 1995 Maddalena sang in the premiere of Elliot Goldenthal's Fire Water Paper: A Vietnam Oratorio and also recorded that work with cellist Yo-Yo Ma.
