= The Chinese Siamese Cat =

Children's picture book

- First edition
- Author: Amy Tan
- Illustrator: Gretchen Schields
- Language: English
- Genre: Children's book
- Published: 1994 (Simon & Schuster Children's Publishing)
- Publication place: United States
- Media type: Print (hardback)
- Pages: unpaginated (32)
- ISBN: 978-0-02-788835-5
- OCLC: 427452871

The Chinese Siamese Cat is a 1994 children's book by Amy Tan. It is about a mother siamese cat telling her kittens how they obtained their distinctive seal point markings.

== Synopsis ==
Sagwa, a young cream kitten, lives in the House of the Foolish Magistrate, a greedy man who only makes up rules that help himself. One day, Sagwa falls into an inkwell and accidentally changes one of the Magistrate's new rules. Little did Sagwa know, she would actually alter the fate (and the appearance) of both China, and the Chinese cats forever.

== Reception ==
Booklist wrote, "Though the story has some inherent charm, the telling is overly long, often dragging. Schields' decorative, ornate illustrations are a running commentary on the elaborately staged tale, reflecting content and tone with a splashy if somewhat garish vigor." and, in a similar vein, the School Library Journal wrote, "With its lengthy, precious text and derivative art, this whimsical look at Imperial China falls far short of the standards set by innovative artists working within the Chinese tradition" and concluded, "Chinese or Siamese, this cat is strictly a commercial product and hardly worth considering."

In contrast, Kirkus Reviews in a star review called it "a beautifully written story ..." and wrote, "[Amy] Tan ... tells this charming tale perfectly, in language that is both simple and elegant. And Schields' artwork complements the text wonderfully with its traditional Chinese border decorations and colorful, well-drawn characters." Publishers Weekly describes it as a "charming original folktale" and wrote, "Featuring inventive borders and vivid, if occasionally garish hues, Schield's energetic illustrations prove, once again, an atmospheric counterpart to Tan's vivacious narration."

== Adaptation ==
Amy Tan created an animated television series, Sagwa, the Chinese Siamese Cat, which premiered on PBS Kids on September 3, 2001. The plot of the book is retold in the series' first episode, "How Sagwa Got Her Colors."
