= Along the Roaring River =

2008 book by Hao Jiang Tian

Along the Roaring River: My Wild Ride from Mao to the Met
- Author: Hao Jiang Tian with Lois B. Morris; Foreword by Robert Lipsyte
- Language: English
- Genre: Memoir
- Publisher: John Wiley & Sons
- Publication date: May 2008
- Pages: 336
- ISBN: 978-0-470-05641-7
- OCLC: 182621384
- Dewey Decimal: 782.1092 B 22
- LC Class: ML420.T49 A3 2008

Along the Roaring River: My Wild Ride from Mao to the Met (2008) is an autobiography by Hao Jiang Tian, a Chinese-American opera singer for the Metropolitan Opera. The book was published in May 2008 by John Wiley & Sons.

== Overview ==
This book is the personal memoir of Hao Jiang Tian, an internationally renowned opera singer with the Metropolitan Opera. Hao Jiang Tian seemed an unlikely candidate for Western classical musical stardom. He was a wild child living on his own during the Cultural Revolution, forced to labor in a factory for seven years, and was nearly thrown out of a music program for wiggling his hips like Elvis in performance. This book shares his operatic tales of love, art, and survival that lead fatefully to the Metropolitan Opera, and on to the world's musical capitals, often alongside Plácido Domingo and Luciano Pavarotti, where he forged the way for Asian singers in the often reluctant opera world.

Born in 1954, Tian was forced to study piano by his People's Liberation Army musician parents, but won a reprieve when his piano teacher was arrested during the Cultural Revolution. After his parents were themselves sent away and he was on his own, he taught himself to play accordion and entertained schoolmates and then his often-illiterate factory mates in the Mao Zedong Thought Propaganda Team. Just before Mao's death, he tricked his way into a voice training program, and ultimately left China during the Anti-Spiritual Pollution Campaign of the mid-80s, to earn a master's degree at the University of Denver.

Not until Tian was 38 and had found his one true love did he first gain a footing in the opera world; his first job was at the Met, where he has sung every year since 1991. Inevitably the book draws the reader back to China, where Tian, now an American citizen, attempts to rescue young artists from today's gritty realities there and to understand for himself the baffling changes that have taken place since he departed.

Tian, a basso cantante, is well known for his role as General Wang in the First Emperor, which premiered at The Met in December 2006, opposite Plácido Domingo, and for the role of Chang the Coffin Maker in the opera The Bonesetter's Daughter which premiered at the San Francisco Opera in September 2008.
