= Sagwa, the Chinese Siamese Cat =

Animated children's television series

- Genre: Historic fiction Adventure; Educational
- Created by: Amy Tan
- Based on: The Chinese Siamese Cat by Amy Tan
- Directed by: Joseph Jacques
- Voices of: Holly Gauthier-Frankel; Hiro Kanagawa; Rick Jones; Oliver Grainger; Jesse Vinet; Ellen David; Arthur Holden; Khaira Ledeyo; Kathy Tsoi; Leanne Adachi; Rosa Yee; Raugi Yu; Russel Yuen; Jaclyn Linetsky
- Theme music composer: Judith Henderson
- Composer: James Gelfand
- Countries of origin: United States; Canada
- Original language: English
- No. of seasons: 1
- No. of episodes: 40 (79 segments)

Production
- Executive producers: Jacques Pettigrew; George Daugherty; Michel Lemire
- Producer: Léon G. Arcand
- Running time: 30 minutes
- Production companies: CinéGroupe; Sesame Workshop

Original release
- Network: PBS Kids (United States); TVOntario (Canada)
- Release: September 3, 2001 – October 5, 2002

Sagwa, the Chinese Siamese Cat, or simply Sagwa, is a children's animated television series based on the children's book The Chinese Siamese Cat, created by Amy Tan which aired on PBS on its PBS Kids programming block and TVOntario, produced by Canadian-based animation studio CinéGroupe and American-based production studio Sesame Workshop.

In the series, which is set c. 1895–1912, after the cinematograph was patented and during the late Qing dynasty, Sagwa has fun in her day-to-day life while learning and teaching valuable life lessons. The show is notable for its setting and messages about family obligations and loyalty. The show is also intentionally cross-cultural, with the theme song in both English and Chinese.

The series was developed and produced for television by executive producers George Daugherty and Michel Lemire, and producers David Ka Lik Wong and Leon G. Arcand.

The series premiered September 3, 2001 on both PBS and TVOntario, with the final episode airing on October 5, 2002 on PBS, running for one season and 40 episodes, with reruns continuing to air on PBS until February 2009, when the show was officially removed from the lineup along with Zoboomafoo and the Berenstain Bears. The show continued airing reruns on TVOntario until January 31, 2015.

The series won the Silver Plaque at the Chicago International Film Festival for Children's Film in 2001, as well as winning an Outstanding Individual in Animation award for background artist Valery Mihalkov at the 29th Daytime Emmy Awards and a "TV Series - Family/Children" award at WorldFest Houston in 2002.

== Premise ==
Sagwa resides in a palace of a magistrate in China in what is assumed to be modern-day Fujian province (possibly during the late Qing Dynasty, as shown by the characters' clothes), as part of a royal family of cats who have the ability to write with their tails. She and her siblings, along with various other cats and Fu-Fu the bat, have adventures that are usually accompanied by moral lessons, as is typical with most children's shows. However, one aspect of the show which sets it apart is its display of various elements of Chinese culture.

== Characters ==
=== Miao family ===
- Sagwa Miao (傻瓜 shǎguā, "silly melon") (voiced by Holly Gauthier-Frankel) is the middle child of the Miao family, as well as the titular protagonist of the series. She is kind, curious, quick thinking, creative and often a bit bossy. She was originally pure white in color, but later gained her current Siamese cat markings after falling into an inkpot. Sagwa is very talented in calligraphy and is said by her parents to have the best artistic skills in the Miao family. She has a golden-yellow and salmon-red Miao Family collar on her neck. While her name literally means "silly melon", it translates to an affectionate way of calling someone a fool.
- Dongwa Miao (冬瓜 dōngguā, winter melon) (voiced by Oliver Grainger) is the oldest child of the Miao family. Intelligent, competitive and sometimes a bit stubborn, Dongwa is independent and often prefers the company of the Alley Cats or solitary martial-arts practice to playing with his younger sisters. He is the only male child of this entire family and is also very caring of his sisters despite the typical sibling squabbles that occasionally occur between them. He is cream-colored and has the traditional Siamese markings and has a purple Miao Family collar on his neck.
- Sheegwa Miao (西瓜 xīguā, watermelon) (voiced by Jesse Vinet) is the youngest child of the Miao family. Curious, very friendly, cheerful and full of energy, Sheegwa is also very optimistic and ascribes good intentions to almost every creature she meets. She is pure white in color, except for a pink tinge on her cheeks, and has a folded right ear. She also has a pink Miao Family collar (with a purple flower symbol on it) on her neck.
- Baba Wim Bao Miao (爸爸寶寶 bàba bǎobǎo, "father darling") (voiced by Arthur Holden) is the father of the Miao family. He is very strict with his children, and in matters of very hard work and duty, but also has a much softer, playful side as well. Baba also fancies himself a devotee of Chinese Opera, although he has Beat deafness. He and Mama are the official calligraphers of the Foolish Magistrate. Baba, like Dongwa, is cream-colored and has typical Siamese facial markings. When Angwan took care of him, she called him Bu-Gu, "Cuckoo Bird". He is also voiced by Bruce Dinsmore in a flashback where he's shown as a younger version of himself.
- Mama Shao Faing Miao (媽媽小風 māma xiǎo fēng, "mother small wind") (voiced by Ellen David) is the mother of the Miao family. Like Baba, she is also a very loving but very strict parent, but is usually much more lenient and gentle than Baba. She and Sagwa have similar coloring and markings.
- Nai-Nai Miao (奶奶 nǎinai, paternal grandmother) (voiced by Sonja Ball) is the grandmother of the Miao family. Grey in color, she is old-fashioned, patient and full of wisdom. She often tells the kittens stories, and the family treats her as a respected ancestor.
- Yeh-Yeh Miao (爺爺 yéyé, paternal grandfather) (voiced by Neil Shee) is the grandfather of the Miao family. Like Nai-Nai, he is very wise and patient. He is a good storyteller, and the kittens treat him with great love and respect.
- Uncle Miao (voiced by Neil Shee) is the paternal uncle of Sagwa and Baba's brother. He's very much into ancient local history.
- Mae-Mae Miao is an aunt of Sagwa and Baba's in-law. She and her husband adopt a dog named Cha-Siu. That dog then became a cousin to the Miao kittens.
- Cha-Siu Miao (叉烧 chāshāo, cousin) (voiced by Daniel Brochu) is the adopted child of Uncle Miao and Aunt Chi-Chi, and a cousin of Sagwa, Dongwa and Sheegwa. He is a puppy dog and is very different than the rest of the family. Sagwa and Sheegwa are very happy to meet him for the first time and immediately bond with him. However, Dongwa isn't very sure about him at first because he's a dog and different than everyone else. After the Sleeve Dogs make fun of him for being a dog and not being able to do anything, Dongwa later comforts him and they bond together.
- Chi-Chi Miao (voiced by Susan Glover) is another aunt of Sagwa and Mama's sister. She is an acrobat and teaches Sagwa and Sheegwa the art of acrobatics.
- Uncle Catfish (voiced by Richard Newman) is a mysterious Uncle to the Miao kittens who could also be a first cousin to Yeh-Yeh. He is half cat and half fish who lives in the water. Sagwa visited him once and he told her a tale of his great-grandmother. She was a cat who fell in the water to meet a fish and that made him who he is today.

=== Humans ===
- Shoo-Jee-Deh-Shan-Taiyeh Suen, the Foolish Magistrate is the ruler of the province, Shoo-Jee-Deh-Shan-Taiyeh ( xū jī de xiàn tàiyé, "county high master of strain spirit ground-bowing") (voiced by Hiro Kanagawa) is a large and rather absent-minded man. He occasionally makes rules without any reason, or makes ill-conceived decisions under pressure from his wife, Tai-Tai, but for the most part he is portrayed as a just and reasonable ruler. He is very fond of his cats, both for their calligraphy skills and for their ability to keep away mice and rats, of which he is deathly afraid of. In one episode, when he says "No rules, no race.", his phrase turns into a musical drumbeat song as a result of being chanted by him.
- Tai-Tai Suen ( tàitài, "wife") (voiced by Khaira Ledeyo) is the Foolish Magistrate's wife. She is a very irritable, strict, and status-conscious woman who really needs to prove her superiority to the "common" people of the village; however, she occasionally shows kindness and rationality, in which she sees the consequences of her actions and apologizes to those she has wronged. She is very attached to the Sleeve Dogs who live in her robe, and values the cats only when they can bring praise to the family. She has a niece called Angwan.
- The Three Daughters are the Magistrate's children, each distinguished by their differently-colored robes. Ba-Do (bái dòu, "white bean") (voiced by Kathy Tsoi) is the oldest of the three, and usually wears pink. Ba-Do is the most prominent of her sisters, having received several episodes partly or entirely centered around her. Luk-Do (lǜ dòu, "green bean") (voiced by Leanne Adachi) is the middle daughter and usually wears yellow. Huang-Do (huáng dòu, "yellow bean") (voiced by Rosa Yee) is the youngest daughter, the tallest of her sisters, and usually wears blue. The girls are generally spoiled, mischievous, and argumentative, but do love and care for each other, and can often be seen playing together.
- Chef Cook (voiced by Raugi Yu) not only prepares meals, but he also attends to medical care and other emergencies around the palace. He is a very good friend of the Reader. Of the humans, he seems to have the closest relationship with the Miao cats.
- Seeyeh Suen is the Advising Reader of the Rules Seeyeh ( shīyé, "division master") (voiced by Russell Yuen) is the Magistrate's brother who is in charge of reading his rules to the villagers; informally, he and the Cook often serve as advisors to the Magistrate as well. He also served as a tutor to the three daughters, and in one episode is discovered to be a very talented poet as well. The reader is often the victim of mishaps caused by others in the palace.
- Jun (voiced by Annette Bening) is the new tutor to the three daughters who appears in the final episodes. She wears purple clothing and is shown to be from another village.
- Sir Richard (voiced by Simon Peacock) is a very clumsy English archaeologist who goes to the palace for tasks. He has brought Sagwa as his good luck kitten into caves and a hot air balloon to help find artifacts. They found the old poetry scrolls from the magistrate's ancestor, and an ancient fossil in a balloon as they were always up for adventure.

=== Best friends / allies ===
- Fu-Fu (福蝠 fú fú, literally "lucky bat") (voiced by Rick Jones) is Sagwa's best friend and a sidekick. A cave-dwelling bat who wears round glasses, he is an extremely clumsy bat who often crashes into trees and other objects due to his poor eyesight. He acts as Sagwa's conscience, warning her against taking unneeded risks, and then rescues Sagwa from the consequences of her adventures.
- The Mice (all voiced by Jaclyn Linetsky) are a large group of other mice live unseen behind the Palace walls. They are close friends of the three kittens and do no harm to the Palace nor its inhabitants. However, the Foolish Magistrate and his family are very afraid of mice in general, so their presence must remain hidden.
- Tung (voiced by Thor Bishopric) is a cricket that belonged to the magistrate that lived in a cage in his study. He sang a song that really annoyed everyone, except the Magistrate who loved him. Tai-Tai snuck behind his back to get rid of him and everyone else thought he died. With the help of Sagwa, he found his way back into the palace. He sang again, but everyone thought he was a different cricket.
- Hai-Yo (voiced by Thor Bishopric) is a bluebird. Dongwa accidentally hurt his wing in the alley. Dongwa tried to help him out and hide him in the clubhouse from the alleycats. He tried to get rid of him to impress his friends, but was looking for him in the end to see if he's alright. They made up in the end. This bird loves flying and looking for worms in the alley. He also made a cameo appearance in "Sagwa's Lucky Bat", as he accidentally ran into FuFu while flying.
- Ping Wing (voiced by Sonja Ball) a pigeon kept by the magistrate in an episode. Sagwa and FuFu fought on who would get more attention for her. She hated the fighting between them and she only wanted to talk to them, if everyone made up. She's also skilled at flying while making music.

=== Other ===
- The Alley Cats are a group of cats who live in the streets and alleys outside the palace grounds. They include "bullies" such as Wing Wing (voiced by Michael Yarmush), Jet Jet (voiced by Mitchell Rothpan), and Lik Lik (voiced by Terrence Scammell) who often tease the Miao kittens because of their "goody-goody" ways and privileged lives. Others, however, are good friends to their siblings Sagwa, Dongwa, and (to a lesser extent), Sheegwa, such as two female alley cats named "Hun-Hun" (voiced by Kathy Tsoi) and "Ling" and three male ones named "Wong Ton" (voiced by Ian James Corlett), Shao-Pao (voiced by Jesse Camacho) (from the birds, bees and silkworms' episode), and "Fam" (voiced by Kyle Fairlie).
- The Sleeve Dogs Ping (voiced by Dean Hagopian), Pong (voiced by Michel Perron), and Pang (voiced by Sonja Ball) are three small Pekingese dog triplets who live in the sleeves of Tai-Tai's robe. They antagonize the cats and boast of their superior status, but invariably their taunting and plots cause them to appear ridiculous and get into lots of trouble in the end.
- Gunji (voiced by Ricky Mabe) is a large red cat that is owned by Tai-Tai's aunt. She has a rooster pillow for her but when she was chasing Sagwa, Sagwa's paw accidentally got stuck in the thread wrecking it. Gungi was blamed at first, but Sagwa told the truth of the accident then everyone knew what happened. In the end, Gungi apologized for being mean and Sagwa was rewarded by her parents.
- Fi-Fu (voiced by Dean Hagopian) and Fo-Fu (voiced by Michel Perron) are two bullies in a pack of bats that antagonized Fu-Fu and made fun of his confidence before he had to leave a full moon flight, and whom Sagwa once blamed as her kidnappers when making up a story about how she got a bad haircut.
- The Rat (voiced by Michael O' Reilly) is a hungry brown rodent who always breaks into the palace to steal food. He led onto the kittens' making deals with them before they realized they were tricked. He was always chased by other cats to leave the palace.
- Oogway (voiced by Howard Ryshpan) is an elderly tortoise. He guided Sagwa in the garden and showed her the beauty of it. He did sleep a lot, and got a rose thorn out of Sagwa's foot. He also made cameo appearances in "The Favorite", and "Lord of the Flies".
- Bei-Hu (voiced by Eleanor Noble) is a tribal cat with larger ears who are owned by traveling entertainers. He and his family do things much different than other cats, as they catch and eat locusts as a hobby. He also pretty smart as he taught Sagwa how to travel home quick and what's East and West.

Many of the names of the characters derive from the Chinese language. Their spellings are romanizations (though not always Wade–Giles, but possibly dialects also), and differ from the standardized Pinyin system.

== Episodes ==
No.	Title	Written by	Storyboarded by	Original release date
1	"How Sagwa Got Her Colors"	Story by : Amy Tan & George Daugherty; Teleplay by : George Daugherty	Robert Yap	September 3, 2001
After a day of playing and calligraphy, at bedtime Mama tells her kittens the story of how Sagwa got ink patches on her paws and face and thwarted one of the Magistrate's unfair laws, with beneficial results for everyone.
2	"The New Year's Clean-Up"	Story by : Amy Tan; Teleplay by : Michael F. Hamill	Karine Charlebois	September 4, 2001
2	"Firefly Nights"	Story by : Amy Tan; Teleplay by : Lienne Sawatsky, Daniel Williams & George Daugherty	Elie Klimos	September 4, 2001
The Magistrate is horrified to find the presence of rats in the palace. Sagwa finds a rat, who tricks her into repeatedly catching him. It results in her getting an inflated reputation, but she realizes he's a cheat and drives him out. Dongwa feels discontented about his kittenhood and tries to act more grown up hoping to see the fireflies in the night sky. After many hardworking tasks, Baba permits him to come and Dongwa is rewarded with a wonderful sight.
3	"Royal Cats"	Matthew Cope	Zoran Vanjaka	September 5, 2001
3	"Acrobat Cats"	Story by : Amy Tan; Teleplay by : Jacques E. Bouchard & George Daugherty	Ventezslav Vesselinov	September 5, 2001
Uncle Miao pays his family a visit. The kittens go exploring a cave in a valley. Inside they find giant clay statues of warriors and their cats. This greatly interests Uncle Miao and the kittens, who discover their ancestral origins. Dongwa and Sheegwa become inspired by acrobatic cats and learn their moves, making Sagwa feel left out. However, Yeh-Yeh and Fu-Fu inspire Sagwa to find her real talent in calligraphy, art and acrobatics.
4	"Tung, the Singing Cricket"	Story by : Amy Tan; Teleplay by : Anne-Marie Perrotta & Tean Schultz	Marco Ménard	September 6, 2001
4	"Sagwa's Lucky Bat"	George Daugherty	Zoran Vanjaka	September 6, 2001
Driven mad by the Magistrate's cacophonic cricket Tung, Tai-Tai tries to get rid of him. This makes the Magistrate ruthless. Tung returns and helps Tai-Tai to set things right. Sagwa shares her newly discovered attic with Fu-Fu and Sagwa remembers how she first met Fu-Fu after he rescued her from an ash pot and Dongwa didn't believe in Sagwa's new-found friend.
5	"Cat Burglar"	Story by : Amy Tan; Teleplay by : Gerard Lewis	Réal Godbout	September 7, 2001
5	"Sagwa's Good Deed"	Story by : Amy Tan; Teleplay by : Anne-Marie Perrotta & Tean Schultz	Patrick Cunningham	September 7, 2001
A Cat Burglar has stolen numerous things, including a ruby belonging to the Magistrate's ancestors. The kittens and Fu-Fu watch the palace and manage to capture the burglar. Sagwa hears how hard it is for Fam and his family to get food, so she shares some of hers with Fam, but pays the price for always being late for dinner because of it. The Miao kittens teach Fam how to fish, and he finds Fu-Fu his lost glasses.
6	"Harvest Festival Race"	Story by : George Daugherty; Teleplay by : Michael F. Hamill	Marco Ménard	September 10, 2001
6	"The Foolish Magistrate's New Robes"	George Daugherty	Gregory Woronchuk	September 10, 2001
The Harvest Festival is taking place. Dongwa tries to ruin Sagwa's efforts to prepare for the annual race. Next day Dongwa cheats to win the race, but later confesses and does a fair rematch. Two con artist tailors get to work making invisible robes for the Magistrate. Those who do not see believe they are fools. Sagwa exposes the tailors' cheating and the Magistrate has the tailors sentenced to make his whole family new clothes. This episode is derived from "The Emperor's New Clothes".
7	"Fur Cut"	Story by : Amy Tan; Teleplay by : Stephen Ashton	Marco Ménard	September 11, 2001
7	"Magistrate Loses His Post"	Story by : Amy Tan; Teleplay by : Michael F. Hamill	Denis Doucet	September 11, 2001
Sagwa gets herself messed up with wet clay. The Cook gives her a bad fur cut. She tries to fool her siblings with a made up story. This causes Fu-Fu to make a mistake, so Sagwa admits the truth before things get out of hand. The Magistrate receives a scroll from the Emperor requisitioning his title. Sagwa struggles and works with the sleeve dogs to catch a fish. It is revealed that the Magistrate received the wrong scroll and he maintains his position.
8	"Tribal Cats"	Story by : Amy Tan; Teleplay by : Gerard Lewis	Marco Ménard	September 12, 2001
8	"Sagwa's Swan Song"	Stephen Ashton	Karine Charlebois	September 12, 2001
Some performers and their cats are coming to the village. After an adventure with Bei-Hu, Sagwa and the cats accept their differences. Meanwhile, the Magistrate persuades Tai-Tai to allow the princesses to watch the performers. Tai-Tai is bitterly disappointed with her wedding anniversary gifts but receives a special swan from the villagers. The Siamese kittens try to make their grandparents' anniversary special, too. That night, Tai-Tai comes to appreciate what she's got.
9	"Cat and Mouse"	George Daugherty	Kevin Currie	September 13, 2001
9	"Stinky Tofu"	Story by : Amy Tan; Teleplay by : Andrew Chappell	Ventezslav Vesselinov	September 13, 2001
The Magistrate's family spot the Miao's mouse friends and the alley cats think their games with the mice is a joke to catkind. After a talk with Fu-Fu, Sagwa is happy to resume playing games with the mice. Yeh-Yeh receives a treat of 100-year-old tofu. The scent really disgusts Sagwa, but she doesn't know how to tell Yeh-Yeh without offending him. Then Sagwa goes on a mission with Yeh-Yeh to get some more old tofu.
10	"Foolish Magistrate's Aching Tooth"	Michael F. Hamill	Zoran Vanjaka	September 14, 2001
10	"Sheegwa and the Blizzard"	Story by : Amy Tan; Teleplay by : Stephen Ashton & George Daugherty	Robert Yap	September 14, 2001
Sagwa and Dongwa accompany the Reader to find a crested porcupine quill to complete a remedy for the Magistrate's toothache. Sagwa thinks a porcupine is a monster, but she befriends one named Hau-Ju and gets a quill. On a very wet day, a generous toy peddler gives the kittens and princesses toys and warns them of a coming blizzard. Insulted by Sagwa, Sheegwa runs away. When the snow comes, Sagwa makes a frantic rescue attempt only to find she's perfectly safe. Sagwa what comes to appreciate the importance of not being so bossy.
11	"Treasure Hunters"	Gerard Lewis	Ventezslav Vesselinov	September 17, 2001
11	"By the Light of the Moon"	Matthew Cope	Zoran Vanjaka & Gregory Woronchuk	September 17, 2001
The Magistrate hires the British archaeologist Sir Richard who sets off to find a treasure of poetry scrolls. Sagwa, Shei-Hu and Fu-Fu join the adventure getting into danger, but they find the treasure and a way out. The moon festival is approaching, but neither the Magistrate's nor Mama Miao's children are participating in a family get together activities. Once the moon cakes are prepared, both families have a happy reunion in the moonlight.
12	"Fraidy Cats"	Story by : Amy Tan; Teleplay by : Stephen Ashton	Nick Boisvert	September 18, 2001
12	"The Tortoise and the Cat"	Story by : Amy Tan; Teleplay by : Don Arioli, George Daugherty & David Wong	Réal Godbout	September 18, 2001
Sheegwa gets scared in the attic and downstairs overhears Yeh-Yeh telling a story about the ghost cat Gui-Miao. Sheegwa is convinced the tale is true, but the kittens see only Fu-Fu who was trying to get shelter from the wind. A tortoise tries to relax amidst Sagwa's play and excitement. He teaches Sagwa how to take the time to admire the beauty and wonders of the plants and animals in the palace garden. Sagwa then shows it all to the mice.
13	"Alley Night Opera"	Story by : Amy Tan; Teleplay by : Matthew Cope & George Daugherty	Karine Charlebois	September 19, 2001
13	"Cats of a Different Class"	George Daugherty	Zoran Vanjaka	September 19, 2001
Baba and Mama have a heated argument over five Dots and singing. After they settle their quarrel, Wu Sheng, the visiting opera monkey dancer, is lacking in helpers for his performance, so the kittens volunteer. The Magistrate receives a visit from his cousin. Sagwa finds that the four visiting cats are unhappy with their cushy lifestyle. By furnishing simple pleasures, Sagwa grants them the happiest moments of their lives.
14	"Sagwa, Fu-Fu and the Whistling Pigeon"	Matthew Cope	Réal Godbout	September 20, 2001
14	"Princess Sheegwa"	Story by : Amy Tan; Teleplay by : Anne-Marie Perrotta & Tean Schultz	Elie Kilmos	September 20, 2001
The Magistrate receives from the Emperor a musical pigeon named Ping-Wing. Fu-Fu and Sagwa compete for her attention. When Ping-Wing gets fed up with them, they make up and everyone does Tai-Chi together. When Sheegwa comes to the pagoda, visitors think she's a princess due to a star mark. Sagwa is jealous of Sheegwa's royal treatment, but then realizes she may not see Sheegwa again. The star mark proves to be only a bit of dirt.
15	"Sagwa Rules"	Story by : Amy Tan; Teleplay by : Stephen Ashton	Patrick Cunningham	September 23, 2001
15	"Ciao, Meow!"	George Daugherty	Denis Doucet	September 23, 2001
Tired of their mother's stern rule dictating, the kittens play with the alley cats without any rules. They then realize that a lack of rules would only mean misery for others. After an accident, they head back to the safety of life with their mother. An Italian ambassador comes to the city. To the Miaos' horror, the ambassador is willing to accept one of the cats to take back to Italy. Both the kittens and Tai-Tai execute plans to make the ambassador change his mind.
16	"Explorer's Club"	Gerard Lewis	Patrick Cunningham	September 24, 2001
16	"Time for Everything"	Anne-Marie Perrotta & Tean Schultz	Réal Godbout	September 24, 2001
Dongwa takes part of the Alley Cats' club and Sagwa forms her own club. This piques the alley cats' interest. Both clubs work together during a dangerous mountain climb and form a new club. Dongwa and Ba-Do spend time doing their favorite hobbies instead of their palace duties. They manage to gain Baba and Tai-Tai's appreciation after showing great talent at their hobbies.
17	"Comic Opera"	Story by : Gretchen Schields; Teleplay by : Gretchen Schields & George Daugherty	Réal Godbout	September 25, 2001
17	"Not-So-Purrfect Patient"	Anne-Marie Perrotta & Tean Schultz	Marco Ménard	September 25, 2001
Sagwa goes on a difficult journey to share with Sing Bad a song for him to sing on Mama's birthday. With Fu-Fu's help, Sing Bad gets the whole song. Dongwa sprains his left foreleg and takes advantage of this to get all the attention. Sagwa and Fu-Fu witness that's he perfectly fine and Mama makes him do a long chore, but both Sagwa and Dongwa make up.
18	"Panda-monium"	Story by : George Daugherty; Teleplay by : Gerard Lewis	Patrick Cunningham	September 26, 2001
18	"Festival of Lanterns"	Story by : Gretchen Schields; Teleplay by : Gretchen Schields & George Daugherty	Kevin Currie	September 26, 2001
The kittens are restricted from the palace rooms due to an important event, but they accidentally chase a baby panda named Ling-Ling inside. The kittens help Ling-Ling to get back to his home and family. Mama and Baba make a tiger lantern for the Magistrate's lantern contest entry. In a tangle with the sleeve dogs, the kittens ruin it. They manage to crudely fix it and the contest judges are impressed with it.
19	"Snagged by a Thread"	Story by : Amy Tan; Teleplay by : Michael F. Hamill	Zoran Vanjaka	September 27, 2001
19	"Master of Mistakes"	Story by : Amy Tan; Teleplay by : Lienne Sawatsky & Daniel Williams	Karine Charlebois	September 27, 2001
Sagwa, Mama Miao, Baba Miao, the Magistrate and Tai-Tai go to visit Tai-Tai's snobbish aunt. While there, the cat Gunji is mean to Sagwa, until they both ruin an elegant pillow. When the difficulties of learning a new skill cause the Magistrate's daughters to give up, he brings in a master of many skills with a unique teaching style.
20	"Collar of Time"	Michael F. Hamill	Ventezslav Vesselinov	September 28, 2001
20	"The Birds, the Bees, and the Silkworms"	Story by : George Daugherty; Teleplay by : Sarah Musgrave & Jason Bogdaneris	Gregory Woronchuk	September 28, 2001
Nai-nai gives Sagwa an old collar which makes her a laughingstock and itches her neck. She buries it, but upon hearing it is an ancient family heirloom, Sagwa gets it back from the Sleeve Dogs who found it. As a great banquet is fast approaching, Tai-Tai orders all birds, silkworms and bees to be driven out, which causes her problems at the banquet. After she fixes the problem, Dongwa finally bids farewell to his moving friend Siao-Po.
21	"Dongwa the Sailor"	Adam Raney	Ghislain Barbe	February 12, 2002
21	"Invention by Mistake"	Story by : Amy Tan; Teleplay by : Michael F. Hamill	Karine Charlebois	February 12, 2002
The Magistrate, the Reader and Dongwa sail in a boat to Kowloon (Hong Kong) to get some pineapple cakes. Dongwa befriends a seawise mouse named Wong-Lo who teaches him how to sail a boat. On a very hot day in the palace, the Magistrate and his family were finding creative ways to stay cool. The Cook was inventing a noodle machine while Sagwa and Fufu were in the clubhouse. They were making riddles and inventions to try to stay cool themselves. When a watering machine was made, Fufu flew off with the cooks noodle machines and it was the last piece for the device. The gardens plants were then watered, and a rainbow was made for a happy ending
22	"Cool Fu-Fu"	Sarah Musgrave & Jason Bogdaneris	Patrick Cunningham	February 13, 2002
22	"A New Cook in the Kitchen"	Story by : Adam Raney; Teleplay by : Lienne Sawatsky & Daniel Williams	Ventezslav Vesselinov	February 13, 2002
Fu-Fu joins the Bat Rebel Fliers squadron. The Rebel Fliers have Fu-Fu cause trouble in the village, which causes him to split with his Siamese friends. Fu-Fu finally resigns from the squadron before he can steal from the Magistrate's plum tree. The cook's little brother, 'Little Cook' is coming. But just before he gets there, cook injures his arm. So little cook takes over his cooking. And everyone seemed to LOVE little cook's dishes and seem to not care about cook anymore. Cook starts feeling left out. In the meantime, Little Cook has the inferiority complex and feels that his cooking wouldn't be as good as Cook's. Reader notices this, and tells Tai-Tai. Later, Tai-Tai requests for a dish that she knows Little Cook can't possibly make. So, Cook and Little Cook teams up and the dish was spectacular! In the meantime, Both Sagwa and Dongwa fights see who's better at gathering water chestnuts. Sheegwa shows them that when their ideas, when used individually, is good, but when put together, is even better.
23	"Tough Guy Dongwa"	Lienne Sawatsky & Daniel Williams	Ventezslav Vesselinov	February 14, 2002
23	"The Competition"	Matthew Cope	Zoran Vanjaka	February 14, 2002
While trying to maintain his reputation with the alley cats, Dongwa helps a downed bird named Haiyo, but he accidentally hurts his feelings. Dongwa repairs his relationships with both Haiyo and Hun-Hun. In a calligraphy competition, the Magistrate met his old friend and their family and they played silly tricks on each other. The two of them got out of hand, it eventually got Sagwa disqualified. After begging the judge for a second chance, Sagwa was reinstated but the magistrates faced the consequences
24	"Precious Gift"	Michael F. Hamill	Ghislain Barbe	February 15, 2002
24	"Lord of the Fleas"	Story by : Adam Raney; Teleplay by : Michael F. Hamill	Mik Cassey & Karine Charlebois	February 15, 2002
Sheegwa finds Tai-Tai's jade necklace, but Sheegwa thinks it is a toy and will not part with, it even though Sagwa tells her it is not hers. The alley cats swipe the necklace, but when Sheegwa gets it back it breaks. Still, Tai-Tai is overjoyed to have it back. During holiday on an island, the sleeve dogs, Sagwa, Sheegwa, Tai-Tai and the Magistrate explore the forest finding it both wonderful and scary. However everyone gets along together back at the beach.
25	"My Fair Kitty"	Anne-Marie Perrotta & Tean Schultz	Lyne Hart	February 18, 2002
25	"The Favorite"	Story by : Gretchen Schields; Teleplay by : Gerard Lewis & Alan Silberberg	Zoran Vanjaka	February 18, 2002
Dongwa switches places with Mung to impress Mung's cousin Chung-Nee. Meanwhile, Tai-Tai tries hard to impress her visiting auntie. Tai-Tai and Mung eventually realize perfection isn't everything. Dongwa is coming with Baba to fish and he believes he is Baba's favorite. They haven't caught a thing and Sagwa neglects her duty to have fun on her own. This postpones the festive boat race, but Baba forgives Sagwa.
26	"Luck be a Bat"	Lienne Sawatsky & Daniel Williams	Gregory Woronchuk	February 19, 2002
26	"Tea for Two"	Matthew Cope	Zoran Vanjaka	February 19, 2002
Fu-Fu is captured by Tai-Tai so he can be her good luck charm. Sagwa helps him escape. After much searching for Fu-Fu, Tai-Tai decides bats are meant to live free and welcomes their presence in the palace. Two Tea-Picking monkeys, Wai and Ting-Ping are hired by the Magistrate to pick fine tea. Sagwa and Dongwa are envious of the attention they get and sabotage the monkeys' harvest, but put things right when they see the harm it has for the monkeys' reputation.
27	"Sagwa the Stray"	Matthew Cope	Gregory Woronchuk	April 2, 2002
27	"…And Action"	Story by : Adam Raney; Teleplay by : Anne-Marie Perrotta & Tean Schultz	Ghislain Barbe	April 2, 2002
As Sagwa has time to herself away from bossy Dongwa, she loses her collar and is adopted by a girl who lives on a boat. A stray cat named Lee-Wan rescues Sagwa and takes her place in the boat. Two Frenchmen come to the village on the Emperor's behalf, to show their latest invention: Moving pictures. Dongwa sees a chance to be a star, but ends up providing amusement when he acts silly instead of doing any actual writing.
28	"Ba-Do and the Lantern Festival"	George Daugherty	Gregory Woronchuk & Stan Gadziola	April 3, 2002
28	"Fu-Fu's Full Moon Flight"	Adam Raney & David Wong	Patrick Cunningham	April 3, 2002
The princesses enjoy the Lantern Festival, but Ba-Do gets dirty, mistaken for a commoner and lost with Sagwa. When they meet a nice old woman, Ba-Do decides to give her lucky money to her and enjoy the last of the festival fireworks instead of seeking for herself. Fu-Fu is tricked into thinking that he is out of his depth. He seeks the wisdom of Master Wu-Fu, a bat elder. At first Fu-Fu finds his lessons a bit odd, but his training pays off, especially when Sagwa is in need of help.
29	"Wedding Day Mess"	Stephen Ashton	Réal Godbout	April 4, 2002
29	"A Catfish Tale"	Gretchen Schields	Karine Charlebois	April 4, 2002
Tai-Tai's niece Angwan comes to the palace to be wed, and Baba reluctant to meet with her. As the kittens try to deliver Angwan a present, a calamity ensues, but Angwan and her groom think it's very funny and the wedding proceeds. Sagwa meets Uncle Catfish who tells a tale about a Ch'in-Ch'in, a female cat who didn't respect her grandfather. She fell underwater and lived with a fish named Callo for so long, she missed her grandfather. After going through a dilemma, she married Callo.
30	"Up, Up and Away"	Gerard Lewis	Zoran Vanjaka	April 5, 2002
30	"Spreading Rumors"	Anne-Marie Perrotta & Tean Schultz	Gregory Woronchak	April 5, 2002
Sagwa and Sheegwa find themselves flying in a hot-air balloon with the explorer Sir Richard to a fossil dig site, with Dongwa and Fu-Fu in pursuit. During the "Emotions of the Heart" festival, Sagwa tells lies about Hun-Hun because Dongwa kept breaking promises he made to Sagwa. Meanwhile, people in the palace spread rumours that Cook is engaged.
31	"The Jade Rabbit"	Lienne Sawatsky, Daniel Williams & Alan Silberberg	Karine Charlebois	April 8, 2002
31	"Dongwa's Best Friend"	Gretchen Schields	Tom Nesbit, Ron Hiscock & Ghislain Barbe	April 8, 2002
On a rainy night, a rabbit called Tetsu joins Sagwa and Fu-Fu in their sleepover and tells them a virtual tale of the Moon Maiden and the Jade Rabbit. A new cat called Won-Tom becomes Dongwa's mate to do a lion dance. Dongwa then realizes that Won-Tom used him and took credit for his dancing. He manages to get the alley cat Ling to join in his own dance.
32	"The Zodiac Zoo"	Story by : George Daugherty; Teleplay by : Anne-Marie Perrotta & Tean Schultz	Ventezslav Vesselinov & Ghislain Barbe	April 9, 2002
32	"The Four Dragons"	Stephen Ashton	Patrick Cunningham	April 9, 2002
Nai-Nai teaches the kittens what their zodiac signs are and tells them the story of the Jade Emperor. He gets all twelve animals to race to determine who is the fastest, resulting in the rat reaching first place. The kittens are fascinated by Nai-Nai's dragon tales and do a play of one to show to the alley cats. Then the mice join in the performance. By the end of the tale, the alley cats are impressed.
33	"Lost and Found"	Matthew Cope	Patrick Cunningham	April 10, 2002
33	"Three Graces"	Story by : George Daugherty; Teleplay by : Lienne Sawatsky & Daniel Williams	Mik Cassey	April 10, 2002
The Emperor's birthday's coming up. The Foolish Magistrate and Tai-Tai get a gold medal made as a gift to him. Sagwa and Fu-Fu stumble on it and play with it. The Reader feels left out when Jun starts helping the girls with their studies.
34	"All Grown Up"	Jacques E. Bouchard	Gregory Woronchuk	April 11, 2002
34	"The Cat and the Wind"	Story by : Amy Tan; Teleplay by : George Daugherty & David Wong	Karine Charlebois	April 11, 2002
Sheegwa tries to act older, while Baba tries to act young again. The kittens, Baba and Fu-Fu go on a treasure hunt, with Sheegwa as the leader. When they find the treasure Sheegwa and Baba finally accept their current ages. Dongwa has no taste for art. Mama tells the kittens a story about the magical artist cat named Ming Miao, who brought life and good from his art. The evil emperor wanted the power of destruction from him, until Ming Miao banished him on a flagship.
35	"Sister Act"	Lienne Sawatsky & Daniel Williams	Ghislain Barbe	April 12, 2002
35	"Too Close for Comfort"	Adam Raney	Zoran Vanjaka	April 12, 2002
Mama's sister, a catrobat named Aunt Chi-Chi is visiting. Sagwa and Sheegwa both learn acrobatics and teamwork. Meanwhile, the Magistrate tries to become like Magistrate Chung until he learns to be true to his character. As a typhoon hits China, the Foolish Magistrate's cousin Leyh and his family take refuge in the palace after his palace roof fell off. Tight quarters lead to conflicts and confusion.
36	"Sick Day"	Alan Silberberg	Ghislain Barbe	April 13, 2002
36	"The Name Game"	Story by : George Daugherty; Teleplay by : Bruce Robb	Yves Rodier	April 13, 2002
Sheegwa is sick so she is begging a story and that's what Mama Miao always does when she is sick. So both Sagwa and Dongwa take turns telling their story. Meanwhile, the Magistrate's cousins are coming over for a family reunion, which puts the Cook in a bind. The alley cats ridicule the kittens' names. Nai-Nai tells the story of how they got their names and the kittens accept their names, not bothered anymore by the alley cats' teasing.
37	"Shei-Hu's Secret"	Story by : Alan Silberberg; Teleplay by : Lienne Sawatsky & Daniel Williams	Karine Charlebois	September 27, 2002 (Note: "Shei-Hu's Secret" was originally released on the Cat Nights, Flights and Delights VHS on July 30, 2002.)
37	"Homesick Jun"	Lienne Sawatsky & Daniel Williams	Gregory Woronchuk	September 27, 2002
Shei-Hu satisfies Sagwa's curiosity on the Mouse Village. Despite her promise to keep it secret, it leaks to the alley cats who accidentally destroy the village. To make it up to the mice, the kittens aid them in rebuilding. Jun becomes homesick, and Sheegwa gets scold by Sagwa and Dongwa after making mistakes, which results in her going missing.
38	"The Return of the Rat"	Michael F. Hamill	Gregory Woronchuk	September 28, 2002
38	"Great Balls of Fire"	Adam Raney	Ventezslav Vesselinov	September 28, 2002
The Rat comes back to the palace on the run from the alley cats. He uses Sheegwa to get what turns out to be a clay cookie. Sagwa makes the rat put it back and then he becomes part of their Zodiac Game/Animal Scavenger Hunt. Uncle Miao takes Sagwa and Dongwa on an Imperial expedition. The two kittens compete to be great helpers, but their hard work pays off and leads them to a meteor discovery. Meanwhile, Sheegwa tries to make the best of her time by herself.
39	"Catsitter"	Sarah Musgrave & Jason Bogdaneris	Zoran Vanjaka	October 4, 2002
39	"On the Run"	Lienne Sawatsky & Daniel Williams	Yves Rodier	October 4, 2002
Auntie Wen looks after the kittens and introduces strange but wise lessons to them. Meanwhile, the princesses try out their new bikes. Sagwa and Fu-Fu hitch a ride with a puppeteer to leave the village. The next village they arrive in is unpleasant, but their saviours the puppeteer and his dog Fang come to the rescue.
40	"Cha-Siu Bow Wow"	George Daugherty & David Wong	Patrick Cunningham	October 5, 2002
40	"Mutt That Would Be King"	Michael F. Hamill	Patrick Cunningham	October 5, 2002
Auntie Mae-Mae, Uncle Miao and their adopted son Cha-Siu come for a visit. To Dongwa's surprise, Cha-Siu is a puppy. The Sleeve Dogs torment Cha-Siu for catlike behaviour but Dongwa helps him to fit in. A lost dog gets bullied by Sagwa and the alley cats. Sagwa makes it up to the dog by helping him find his way home.

== Production ==
The series was announced on January 19, 2000, serving as a collaboration between the Children's Television Workshop, CinéGroupe and IF/X Productions, with Amy Tan and original book illustrator Gretchen Schields serving as creative consultants. A total of 80 15-minute episodes were produced, packaged as 40 half-hours. Notably, despite being part of the PBS Kids Ready to Learn service, reports on its budget or source of funding were not mentioned.

== Broadcast ==
Sesame Workshop handled distribution rights for the show in the United States, United Kingdom, Ireland, Asia, CEE and MENA territories, Scandivania, Australia, New Zealand and German-speaking territories, while CinéGroupe handled all other territories.

== Home media ==
=== Canada ===
From 2002 to 2003, CinéGroupe Star released six volumes of the series in Canada. The VHS versions were released in both separate English and French versions, while the DVD counterparts featured both languages.

=== United States ===
In 2003, PBS Home Video and Warner Home Video brought each compilation of individual episodes to VHS and DVD.

On VHS, there were eight volumes with each containing three episodes. On DVD, there were four volumes which each contain six episodes each. Each DVD combined episodes from each pair of the VHS tapes. A pair of VHS titles (Best Friends and Family Fun) were renamed for the Feline and Friends and Family DVD. There was also a 6 volume DVD box set, with each disc consisting of 5-6 episodes. Every disc comprises episodes based on themes and were divided in half for those select sections of segments.

In 2006, Paramount Home Entertainment brought sixteen episodes from the show were released on one disc as part of the PBS Kids pack anthology set, with the two other discs containing episodes from Zoboomafoo and George Shrinks.

==== VHS ====
July 30, 2002

- Cat Nights, Flights and Delights – "Firefly Nights", "Fu-Fu's Full Moon Flight", "Shei-Hu's Secret"
- Feline Frenzy – "Explorer's Club", "Treasure Hunters", "Sick Day"

January 28, 2003

- Cat Tales – "How Sagwa Got Her Colors", "Fur Cut", "Stinky Tofu"
- Feline Festivities – "The New Year's Clean-Up", "Ba-Do and the Lantern Festival", "By the Light of the Moon"

April 1, 2003

- Best Friends – "Sagwa's Lucky Bat", "Cat and Mouse", "Dongwa's Best Friend"
- Family Fun – "Royal Cats", " The Cat and the Wind", "Ciao, Meow!"

July 29, 2003

- Kitty Concerto – "Alley Night Opera", "Comic Opera", "Tung, the Singing Cricket"
- Sagwa's Petting Zoo – "The Birds, the Bees and the Silkworms", "Panda-monium", "Sagwa, Fu-Fu, and the Whistling Pigeon"

==== DVD ====
January 28, 2003

- Sagwa's Storybook World (combines Cat Nights, Flights and Delights and Feline Frenzy)
- Cat Tales and Celebrations (combines Cat Tales and Feline Festivities)

July 29, 2003

- Great Purr-formances (combines Kitty Concerto and Sagwa's Petting Zoo)
- Feline Friends and Family (combines Sagwa's Feline Friends (a.k.a. Best Friends) and Sagwa's Family Tree (a.k.a. Family Fun)

=== Online streaming ===
In 2018, TFO's MiniMation YouTube channel began uploading episodes from the French version. The series was also briefly on Google Play.
