= The Opposite of Fate: A Book of Musings =

2003 memoir by Amy Tan

- First edition
- Author: Amy Tan
- Language: English
- Subject: Memoir
- Publisher: G. P. Putnam's Sons
- Publication date: 2003
- Publication place: USA
- Media type: Print (Hardback)
- Pages: 398
- ISBN: 9780399150746
- OCLC: 52493386

The Opposite of Fate: A Book of Musings is a 2003 memoir by Amy Tan. It is a collection of essays about her life, family, and influences.

== Reception ==
Publishers Weekly called it a "robust book" and wrote "this is a powerful collection that should enthrall readers of The Joy Luck Club and Tan's other novels." Kirkus Reviews wrote "her prose is thoughtful, never maudlin or self-pitying. Tan writes as easily and unpretentiously about herself as about others." and described it as "An examined life recalled with wisdom and grace."

== Awards ==
- New York Times Notable Book
- Booklist Editors' Choice
- 2004 Audie Award for Best Nonfiction, Abridged
