= Norwin S. and Elizabeth N. Bean Foundation =

- Type: Charitable foundation
- Headquarters: Manchester, NH, United States
- Revenue: $1,068,690 (2015)
- Expenses: $746,510 (2015)
- Website: beanfoundation.org

The Norwin S. and Elizabeth N. Bean Foundation is a general purpose charitable foundation, which makes grants in the fields of arts and humanities, education, environment, health, human services, and public/ society benefit in New Hampshire.

== Founders ==
Norwin S. Bean was born in Manchester, New Hampshire in 1873. He graduated from the Massachusetts Institute of Technology with a degree in electrical engineering. Although an EE by degree, he spent most of his professional career in the banking industry. He was the Treasurer and Chief Executive Officer of Manchester Savings Bank for twenty-five years. He was also a prominent civic and business leader, serving as a director of Amoskeag Industries, the Manchester Gas Company, New Hampshire Insurance Company and the Public Service Company of New Hampshire. The charities he supported during his lifetime included the Manchester Community Chest, Family Service Society, the Institute of Arts and Science, and the Currier Gallery.

Elizabeth N. Bean was born in 1874 in Amherst, New Hampshire. She was a member of the Amherst Congregational Church and active in many charitable organizations, including the Amherst Visiting Nurse Association and the Amherst Historical Society.

== Funding ==
Originally, the foundation was established under the will of Norwin, who died in 1957, since the Beans had no children. There was a provision in the trust that provided a life estate for Mrs. Bean. However, during her remaining years, Elizabeth added substantially to the coffers of the trust. At the time of its creation, the Bean Foundation had assets of just under $4 million. The foundation then became active when Elizabeth died in 1967.

The foundation makes grants for about $700K per year, making it the 9th highest of the top giving foundations in New Hampshire.

== Trustees ==
All decisions on grant applications are made by the foundation's five-member board of trustees. Three of these are term trustees, who are appointed by the Judge of Probate for a three-year term. In addition, there are two senior trustees, each with a 15-year term. The board of trustees has a policy that new trustees may not vote until their second year of their term. This is to ensure that before voting, they are familiar with the grant-making practices and policies.

== Communities served ==
The Beans maintained homes in both Manchester and Amherst, and the two communities benefit today from the charitable foundation they created. Approximately 90% of each year's grants are allocated for Manchester organizations, and 10% on Amherst organizations. This distribution was determined based on the population of each.
