= Amy Tan =

American novelist (born 1952)

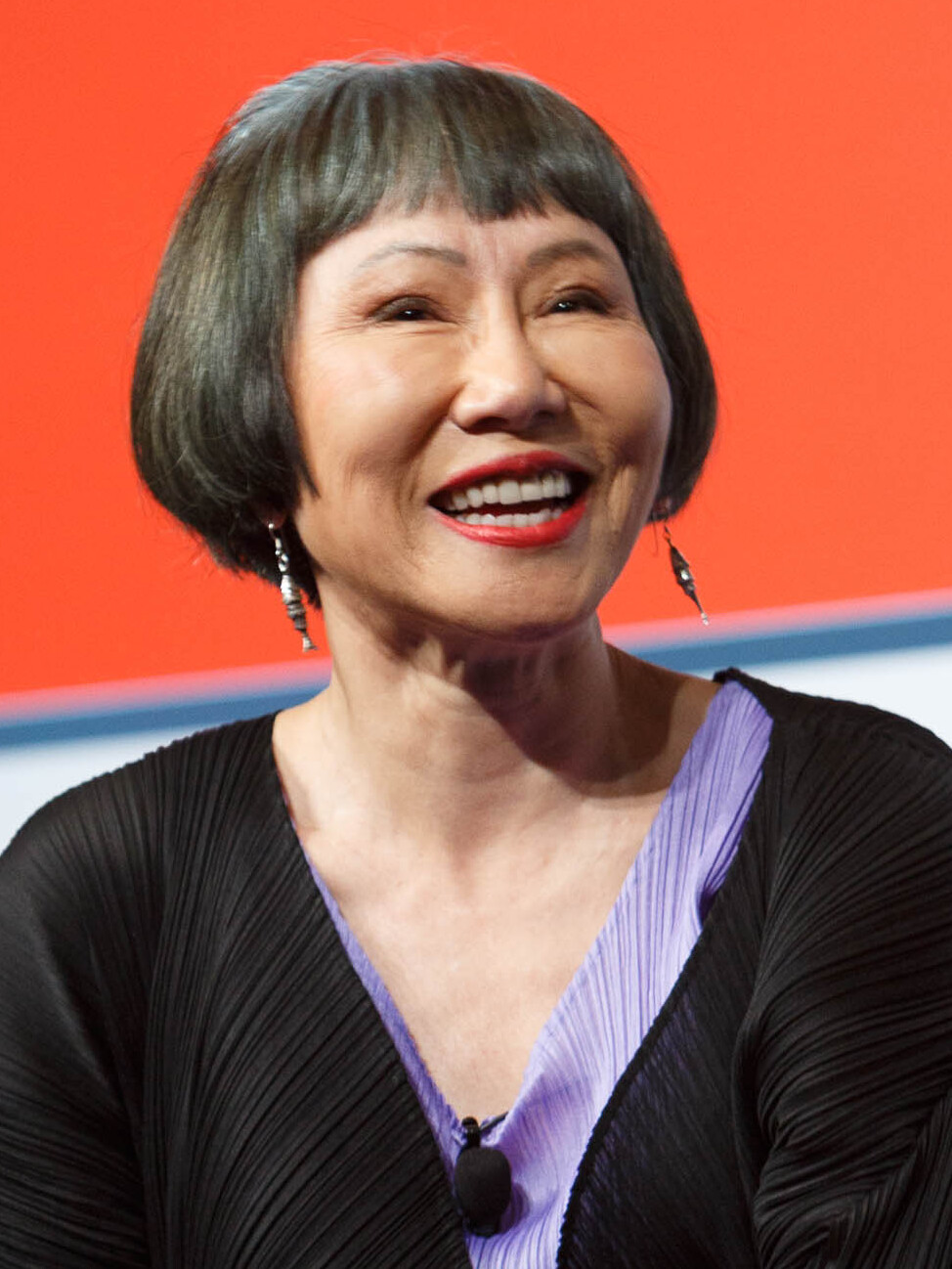
- Tan in 2018
- Born: Amy Ruth Tan; February 19, 1952 (age 74); Oakland, California, U.S.
- Education: San Jose State University (BA, MA)
- Occupation: Writer
- Spouse: Lou DeMattei (m. 1974)
- Writing career
- Notable works: The Joy Luck Club (1989), The Bonesetter's Daughter (2001)
- Notable awards: National Humanities Medal

Chinese name
- Traditional Chinese: 譚恩美
- Simplified Chinese: 谭恩美
Transcriptions
Standard Mandarin
- Hanyu Pinyin: Tán Ēnměi
Yue: Cantonese
- Jyutping: Taam4 Jan1mei5
- Website: www.amytan.net

Amy Ruth Tan (born February 19, 1952) is an American author best known for her novel The Joy Luck Club (1989), which was adapted into a 1993 film.

Tan has earned a number of awards including the National Humanities Medal, the Carl Sandburg Literary Award, and the Common Wealth Award of Distinguished Service.

Tan is also the author of The Kitchen God's Wife (1991), The Hundred Secret Senses (1995), The Bonesetter's Daughter (2001), Saving Fish from Drowning (2005), and The Valley of Amazement (2013). Tan has also written two children's books: The Moon Lady (1992) and The Chinese Siamese Cat (1994), which was turned into an animated series that aired on PBS. Her latest book is The Backyard Bird Chronicles (2024), an illustrated account of her experiences with birding and the 2016-era sociopolitical climate.

== Biography ==
Amy Tan was born in Oakland, California. She is the second of three children born to Chinese immigrants John and Daisy Tan. Her father was an electrical engineer and Baptist minister who traveled to the United States, to escape the chaos of the Chinese Civil War. John Tan was pastor of First Chinese Baptist Church of Fresno, California when Amy was born. She recounts that her father and she would read the thesaurus together, since "he was very interested in what a word contains." This was the beginning of her path to becoming a writer, as she wanted to use words to create stories to make herself feel understood. Amy attended Marian A. Peterson High School in Sunnyvale, for a year. When she was fifteen, her father and older brother, Peter, both died of brain tumors within six months of each other.

Her mother Daisy moved the family to Switzerland, where Amy finished high school at the Institut Monte Rosa, Montreux. During this period, Amy learned about her mother's previous marriage to another man in China, of their four children (a son who died as a toddler and three daughters). She also learned how her mother left those children in Shanghai. This incident was a catalyst for Amy's first novel, The Joy Luck Club. In 1987, Amy traveled with Daisy to China, where she met her three half-sisters.

Amy had a problematic relationship with her mother, who once held a knife to her throat and threatened to kill her while arguing over Amy's new boyfriend. Her mother wanted Amy to be independent and self-sufficient. Amy later found out that her mother had three abortions while in China. Daisy often threatened to kill herself, saying that she wanted to join her mother (Amy's grandmother, who died by suicide). She attempted suicide but never succeeded. Daisy died in 1999 at the age of 83; she had Alzheimer's disease.

After Amy dropped out of Linfield College in Oregon to follow her boyfriend to San Jose City College in California, she did not speak to her mother for six months. Amy met her boyfriend on a blind date, and married him in 1974. Amy later received bachelor's and master's degrees in English and linguistics from San José State University. She took doctoral courses in linguistics at University of California, Santa Cruz and University of California, Berkeley. While in school, Tan worked as a switchboard operator, carhop, bartender, and pizza maker before starting a writing career.

== Literary career ==
As a freelance business writer, she worked on projects for AT&T, IBM, Bank of America, and Pacific Bell, writing under non-Chinese-sounding pseudonyms. These projects had turned into a 90-hours-a-week workaholism.

Early in 1985, Tan began writing her first novel, The Joy Luck Club, while working as a business writer. She joined a writers' workshop, the Community of Writers in Olympic Valley, CA, to refine her draft. She submitted a part of the draft as a story titled 'Endgame' to the workshop.

Before attending the program, Tan read Louise Erdrich's Love Medicine and was "amazed by her voice... [she] could identify with the powerful images, the beautiful language, and such moving stories." Later, many critics compared Tan to Erdrich. Author Molly Giles, who was teaching at the workshop, encouraged Tan to send some of her writing to magazines. Tan credits Giles with guiding her to the end of writing the book. It began with Giles' seeing a dozen stories in the 13 page draft submitted to the program. Stories by Tan, drawn from the manuscript of The Joy Luck Club, were published by both FM Magazine and Seventeen, although a story was rejected by the New Yorker.

After the acceptances and a rejection, Tan joined a new San Francisco writers' group led by Giles. Giles recommended Tan to academic-turned agent Sandra Dijkstra, in 1987. In May of that year, an Italian magazine translated and published 'Endgame,' without permission. Dijkstra advised Tan to send her another story; "Waiting Between the Trees" arrived, written as an experiment to decide whether the stories collectively become a novel or a book of short stories. Dijkstra signed up Tan and asked Tan to write a synopsis for the book, along with an outline for other stories.

Working with Dijkstra, Tan published several other parts of the novel as short stories, before sending it out as a full-scale manuscript. She received offers from A.A. Knopf, Vintage, Harper & Row, Weidenfeld & Nicolson, Simon and Schuster, and Putnam Books, but she declined them all, as they did not offer sufficient compensation. Tan eventually accepted a second offer from G. P. Putnam's Sons for $50,000 in December 1987. The Joy Luck Club consists of eight related stories about the experiences of four Chinese–American mother–daughter pairs. Tan dedicated the book to her mother, with the following words: "You asked me, once, what I would remember. This, and much more."

Tan predicted to her husband that the novel would disappear from the bookstore shelves after six weeks as was the case for most first novels. Putnam Books auctioned the reprint rights in April 1989, which were bought by Vintage Books, the trade paperback division of Random House. Vintage's successful bid was at US$1.2 million. However, Random House decided to alter plans, and Ivy Books was assigned to print the paperback version, first, in the mass-market version, followed by Vintage, for a smaller audience, as a more expensively produced version. When the paperback version came out, its hardcover had already undergone 27 printings, with sales of over 200,000 copies. By 1991, the book had already been translated into 17 languages.

Tan's second novel, The Kitchen God's Wife, also focuses on the relationship between an immigrant Chinese mother and her American-born daughter. On its writing inspiration, Tan explained, "My mother said, when I started The Kitchen God's Wife, that she liked The Joy Luck Club very much, it's very fictional, but next time, tell my story." Tan added that there are many fictionalized parts in the story narration, too. Tan, later, referred to this book as the "much more" that she remembered, as mentioned in the dedication page of her first book. This novel is significant, as it narrates a historical period of China between the 1930s and 1940s, including Nanjing Massacre.

G. P. Putnam's Sons released the book in June 1991 and priced the hardcover at US$21.95.

=== Other books ===
Tan's third novel, The Hundred Secret Senses, was a departure from the first two novels, in focusing on the relationships between sisters, inspired, partly, by one of the half-siblings Tan sponsored to the United States.

Tan's fourth novel, The Bonesetter's Daughter, returns to the theme of an immigrant Chinese woman and her American-born daughter.

In 2024, Tan published The Backyard Bird Chronicles, her illustrated account of birding as a coping mechanism during the divisive 2016 US Presidential election.

=== Where the Past Begins: A Writer's Memoir ===
4th Estate published Tan's memoir, in October 2017. The book cover was released earlier in April. In the book, using family photographs and journal entries, she writes about the relationship with her mother, the death of her father and brother, stories of her half-sisters and grandmother in China, her diagnosis of chronic Lyme disease, and life as a writer. In comparison to her fiction writing, Tan said a memoir is "unvarnished.” While writing a memoir, her recollection and sequence of events might not be orderly for the reader. They emerge according to their importance and how they shaped her.

== Music career ==
Tan was the "lead rhythm dominatrix,” backup singer and second tambourine with the Rock Bottom Remainders literary garage band. Before the band retired from touring, it had raised more than a million dollars for literacy programs. Tan appeared as herself in the third episode of Season 12 of The Simpsons, "Insane Clown Poppy."

== Adaptations ==
Tan's work has been adapted into several other media. The Joy Luck Club was adapted into a play, in 1993; that same year, director Wayne Wang adapted the book into a film. The Bonesetter's Daughter was adapted into an opera, in 2008. Tan's children's book, The Chinese Siamese Cat, was adapted into an PBS animated television show, entitled Sagwa, the Chinese Siamese Cat.

In May 2021, the documentary Amy Tan: Unintended Memoir was released in the American Masters series on PBS. It was later released on Netflix.

== Critical reception ==
Tan's writing has been praised for its bravery in exploring both the personal struggles and triumphs of immigrant families. Her first book, The Joy Luck Club, which is considered a prominent contribution to the Modern Period of American literature, was called "a jewel of a book" by the New York Times, noting Tan's "deep empathy for her subject matter" and the "rare fidelity and beauty" of her storytelling. The Joy Luck Club went on to be a bestseller, and was a finalist for both the National Book Award and the National Book Critics Circle Award. That book, and her subsequent novels, have spent forty weeks on the New York Times Bestsellers list.

In 2021, Tan was presented the National Humanities Medal for her contribution to expanding the American literary canon, and in the same year won the Carl Sandburg Literary Award. Tan also received the Common Wealth Award of Distinguished Service for her contribution to world community.

Sau-ling Cynthia Wong, a professor at the University of California, Berkeley, wrote that Tan's novels "are often products of the American-born writer's own heavily mediated understanding of things Chinese,” and author Frank Chin, who has said that her novels "demonstrate a vested interest in casting Chinese men in the worst possible light". In response, Tan has dismissed these criticisms, stating that her works arise from her personal family experiences as a Chinese-American and are not intended as a representation of the general Chinese/East Asian American experience.

== Personal life ==
While Tan was studying at Berkeley, her roommate was murdered, and Tan had to identify the body. The incident left her temporarily mute. She said that every year for ten years, on the anniversary of the day she identified the body, she lost her voice.

At Squaw Valley in 1993, Tan and her husband may have been the first ski school clients ever to learn to carve on modern, shaped skis.

Tan believes she developed chronic Lyme disease, a condition unrecognized by medical science, in 1998. She attributes health complications like epileptic seizures to chronic Lyme disease. Tan co-founded LymeAid 4 Kids, which helps uninsured children pay for treatment.

Tan also suffered from depression, for which she was prescribed antidepressants. Part of the reason that Tan chose not to have children was a fear that she would pass on a genetic legacy of mental instability. Her maternal grandmother died by suicide, her mother threatened suicide often, and she herself has struggled with suicidal ideation.

In February 2025, the Bancroft Library of University of California, Berkeley, announced that it had acquired an archive of Tan's work through a combination of donations and purchases using endowment funds. Having previously claimed that she would have her possessions shredded upon death to avoid posthumous scrutiny, Tan explained her change of heart as accepting posterity.

Tan lives near San Francisco in Sausalito, California, with her husband, Lou DeMattei (whom she married in 1974), in a house they designed "to feel open and airy, like a tree house, but also to be a place where we could live, comfortably, into old age" with accessibility features. In recent years, she has developed interests in birding and nature journaling.

== Published works ==
=== Short stories ===
- "Mother Tongue" (1990)
- "Fish Cheeks" (1987)
- "The Voice from the Wall"
- "Rules of the Game"
- "Two Kinds"

=== Novels ===
- The Joy Luck Club (1989)
- The Kitchen God's Wife (1991)
- The Hundred Secret Senses (1995)
- The Bonesetter's Daughter (2001)
- Saving Fish from Drowning (2005)
- The Valley of Amazement (2013)

=== Children's books ===
- The Moon Lady, illustrated by Gretchen Schields (1992)
- The Chinese Siamese Cat, illustrated by Gretchen Schields (1994)

=== Nonfiction ===
- Mid-Life Confidential: The Rock Bottom Remainders Tour America With Three Chords and an Attitude (with Dave Barry, Stephen King, Tabitha King, Barbara Kingsolver) (1994)
- Mother (with Maya Angelou, Mary Higgins Clark) (1996)
- The Best American Short Stories 1999 (Editor, with Katrina Kenison) (1999)
- The Opposite of Fate: A Book of Musings (G. P. Putnam's Sons, 2003, ISBN 9780399150746)
- Hard Listening: The Greatest Rock Band Ever, (of Authors) Tells All (with Mitch Albom, Dave Barry, Sam Barry, Roy Blount Jr., Matt Groening, Ted Habte-Gabr, Greg Iles, Stephen King, James McBride, Roger McGuinn, Ridley Pearson, Scott Turow), an interactive ebook about her participation in a writer/musician band, the Rock Bottom Remainders (Coliloquy, 2013)
- Where the Past Begins: A Writer's Memoir (HarperCollins, 2017, ISBN 9780062319296)
- The Backyard Bird Chronicles, written and illustrated by Tan (Knopf, 2024, ISBN 9780593536131)

== Awards and recognition ==
- 1989, Finalist National Book Award for The Joy Luck Club
- 1989, Finalist National Book Critics Circle Award for The Joy Luck Club
- Finalist Los Angeles Times Fiction Prize
- Bay Area Book Reviewers Award
- Commonwealth Gold Award
- American Library Association's Notable Books
- American Library Association's Best Book for Young Adults
- 2005–2006, Asian/Pacific American Awards for Literature Honorable Mention for Saving Fish From Drowning
- The Joy Luck Club selected for the National Endowment for the Arts' Big Read
- The New York Times Notable Book
- Booklist Editors Choice
- Finalist for the Orange Prize
- Nominated for the Orange Prize
- Nominated for the International Dublin Literary Award
- Audie Award: Best Non-fiction, Abridged
- Parents' Choice Award, Best Television Program for Children
- Shortlisted British Academy of Film and Television Arts award, best screenplay adaptation
- Shortlisted WGA Award, best screenplay adaptation
- 1996, Golden Plate Award of the American Academy of Achievement

== See also ==
- Chinese American literature
