= The Joy Luck Club (novel) =

1989 novel written by Amy Tan

- First edition
- Author: Amy Tan
- Language: English
- Genre: Fiction
- Publisher: G. P. Putnam's Sons
- Publication date: 1989
- Publication place: United States
- Pages: 288
- ISBN: 0-399-13420-4
- OCLC: 18464018
- Dewey Decimal: 813/.54 19
- LC Class: PS3570.A48 J6 1989

The Joy Luck Club is a 1989 novel written by Amy Tan. It focuses on four Chinese immigrant families in San Francisco who start a mahjong club known as The Joy Luck Club. The book is structured similarly to a mahjong game, with four parts divided into four sections to create sixteen chapters. The three mothers and four daughters (one mother, Suyuan Woo, dies before the novel opens) share stories about their lives in the form of short vignettes. Each part is preceded by a parable relating to the themes within that section. The novel has been widely discussed for its portrayal of Chinese immigrant mothers and their American-born daughters, especially around bilingual, bicultural, and intergenerational identity conflicts.

In 1993, the novel was adapted into a feature film directed by Wayne Wang and starring Ming-Na Wen, Lauren Tom, Tamlyn Tomita, France Nuyen, Rosalind Chao, Kieu Chinh, Tsai Chin, Lisa Lu, and Vivian Wu. The screenplay was written by the author Amy Tan along with Ronald Bass. The novel was also adapted into a play by Susan Kim, which premiered at Pan Asian Repertory Theatre in New York.

== Plot ==
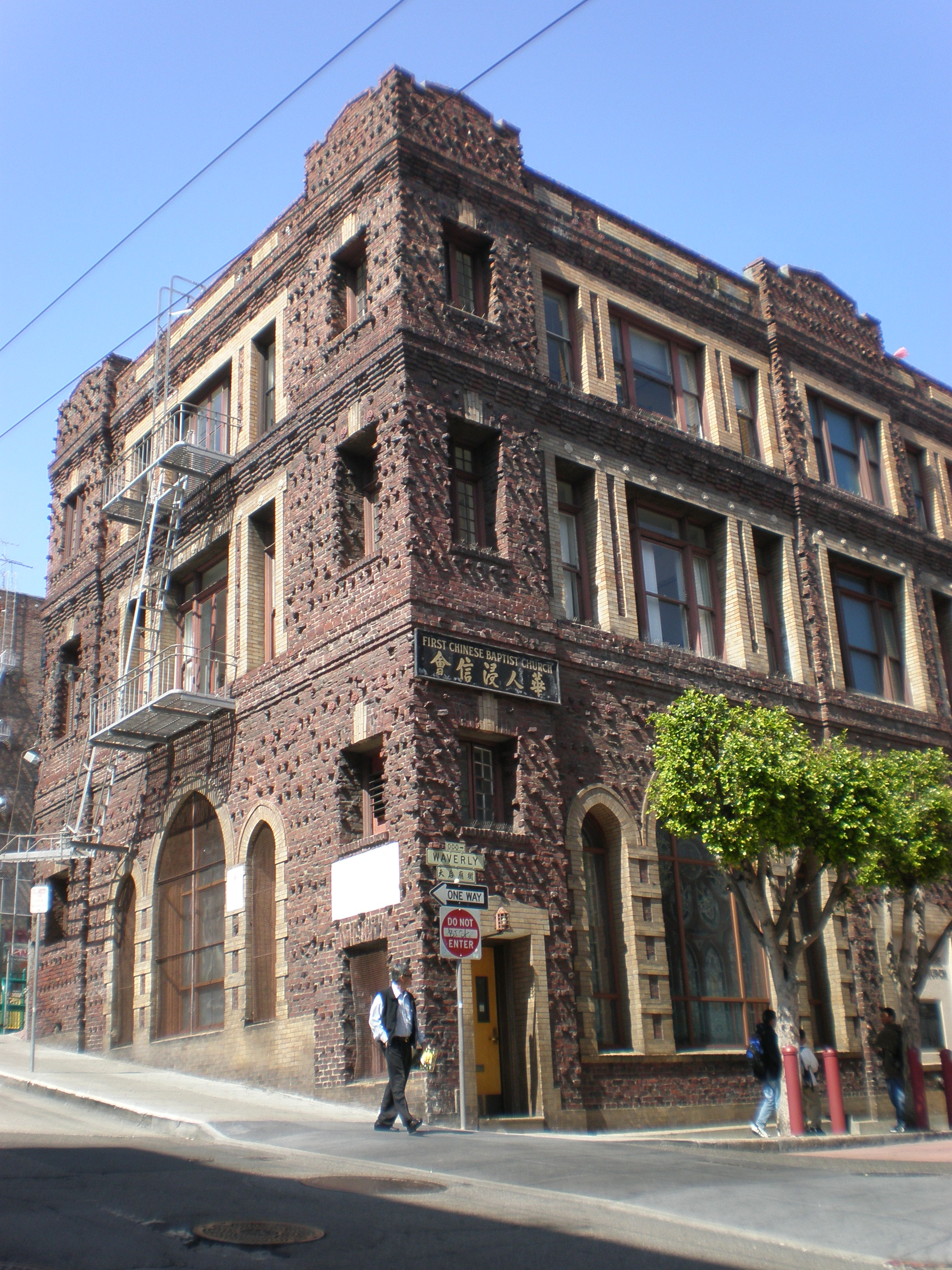
First Chinese Baptist Church at 15 Waverly Pl, San Francisco

The Joy Luck Club consists of sixteen interlocking stories about the lives of four Chinese immigrant mothers and their four American-born daughters. In 1949, the four mothers meet at the Second Chinese Baptist Church in San Francisco and agree to continue to meet to play mahjong. They call their mahjong group the Joy Luck Club. The stories told in this novel revolve around the Joy Luck Club women and their daughters. Structurally, the novel is divided into four major sections, with two sections focusing on the stories of the mothers and two sections on the stories of the daughters.

=== Feathers from a Thousand Li Away ===
The first section, "Feathers from a Thousand Li Away", introduces the Joy Luck Club through daughter Jing-Mei "June" Woo, whose late mother Suyuan Woo founded the Joy Luck Club, and focuses on the four mothers. June relates the story of how her mother Suyuan was the wife of an officer in the Kuomintang during World War II and how she was forced to flee from her home in Kweilin and abandon her twin daughters along with her belongings. Suyuan later found out that her first husband died. She later married Canning Woo and immigrated to the United States where their daughter, June, was born. Suyuan and Canning attempted to find Suyuan's daughters, and Canning assumed that Suyuan had given up hope. June, who has been asked to take her mother's place in the Joy Luck Club, learns from the other mothers that her half-sisters are alive. They ask that June go to China and meet her sisters, and tell them about Suyuan's death.

The other three mothers relate the stories of their childhood. An-Mei Hsu's story relates how her mother left her family to become the third concubine of Wu Tsing, a rich merchant, while An-Mei was raised by her maternal grandmother. Her mother returns only to cut off a piece of her flesh to cook a soup in hopes of healing An-Mei's grandmother, though An-Mei's grandmother still dies.

Lindo Jong explains how in childhood she was forced into a loveless marriage and was pressured by her mother-in-law's desire for Lindo to produce grandchildren. Through her own ingenuity, Lindo fabricates a convincing story to annul her marriage and emigrate to the United States.

The final story of the first section follows Ying-Ying St. Clair, who tells the story of how she fell into a lake during the Mid-Autumn festival when she was only four. After being rescued by a group of fishermen, she realizes that she is lost. This experience emotionally traumatizes her, and she is dropped at the shore, and wanders into an outdoor performance featuring the Moon Lady, said to grant wishes. But when Ying-Ying approaches the Moon Lady after the play to wish to be returned to her family, she discovers the Moon Lady is played by a man.

=== Twenty-Six Malignant Gates ===
The second section traces the childhoods of the Joy Luck children. In the first story, Waverly Jong talks about how she started playing chess, first with her brothers and then with old men in the playground near her school. At the age of nine, she becomes a national chess champion. She is embarrassed when her mother, Lindo, introduces her to everyone she meets, showing her off like a trophy and seeming to take the credit for her daughter's brilliance. This leads to an angry confrontation between the two of them.

Lena relates the stories her mother told her when she was younger (her great-grandfather sentenced a beggar to die in the worst possible manner). Lena's family moves to North Beach from Oakland. Her mother, who seems restless, delivers an anencephalic child who dies at birth. In Lena's eyes, her mother becomes a 'living ghost'. The story of their neighbors and the relationship between the mother and the daughter of the neighboring household is also mentioned.

Rose Hsu Jordan wishes to tell her mother that she plans to divorce her husband Ted. She reflects on their relationship. She then goes on to relate an incident in which her family (her parents and six siblings) go to the beach. Her youngest brother, Bing, falls into the ocean when her other brothers fight. She returns along with her mother An-Mei to search for Bing, but in vain.

The last story is that of June Woo and the pressure that her mother puts on her to perform exceedingly well in some field (to be a child prodigy). She begins to learn to play the piano but does not perform well in a concert and stops playing. This disappoints her mother because she wanted her to be a great pianist and June shows no interest in being anything else but herself. Around her 30th birthday, Suyuan presents her an old piano which she used to play as a child. Although June admits she had forgotten how to play the piano, Suyuan encourages her to try again. She admits to June that she still has the talent to be a great pianist, but self-doubt holds her back.

=== American Translation ===
The third section follows the Joy Luck children as adult women, all facing various conflicts. In Lena's story, she narrates her troubling marital problems and how she fears being inferior to her husband, Harold Livotny. She does not realize he has taken advantage of her both at home and at work, where he is also her boss and earns much more than her. Ying-Ying is very much aware of this. She pointed out how Lena knew a table would crumble yet did nothing to stop it, symbolizing that her marriage will crumble because it has a weak foundation. Lena finally admits she is not happy in her marriage to Harold and is lost inside. Ying-Ying encourages her to stop being passive and stand up to her husband or nothing will change.

Waverly Jong worries about her mother's opinion of her white fiancé, Rich, and recalls quitting chess after becoming angry at her mother in the marketplace. She believes that her mother will still have absolute power over her and will object to her forthcoming marriage to Rich, after she did the same to her previous husband, Marvin Chen, with whom she has a daughter, Shoshana. After a disastrous attempt at a dinner party to tell her mother of their wedding, Waverly confronts her mother the morning afterwards and realizes that her mother has known all along about her relationship with Rich and has accepted him.

Rose Hsu Jordan learns that Ted intends to marry someone else after divorcing her. She realizes through her mother's advice that she needs to fight for her rights and refuses to sign the conditions set forth by his divorce papers. She hires a good lawyer and wins possession of the house, forcing Ted to take her more seriously.

In June's story, June has an argument with Waverly at a Chinese New Year's dinner the year before the story begins. Realizing that June has been humiliated, Suyuan gives her a special jade pendant called "life's importance", which she has worn since June was an infant. June regrets that she never learned the meaning of the pendant's name. She also confronts Suyuan with the belief that she had always been disappointed in June and admitted she could never live up to her high expectations. June believes that because she has never finished college, does not have a good career, and remains unmarried, she is seen as a failure in her mother's eyes. Suyuan eventually reveals her true meaning; that while Waverly has style, she lacks the kind and generous heart that June has. She also tells June that she understands the frustrations of never being good enough in her eyes and admits she is proud of June.

=== Queen Mother of the Western Skies ===
The final section of the novel, the title of which refers to the Chinese goddess Xi Wangmu, returns to the viewpoints of the mothers as adults dealing with difficult choices. An-Mei reveals what happened after her grandmother died, she angered her relatives by leaving with her mother. They return to the home where her mother lived as the abused fourth concubine of Wu Tsing, whose second concubine manipulates and controls the household and has taken An-Mei's half-brother as her son. An-Mei learns how her mother was forced into accepting her position after Wu Tsing's second wife arranged for An-Mei's mother to be raped and shamed. When she came to her family for help, they cruelly turned their backs on her mother and told her to leave. An-Mei finds her mother has poisoned herself two days before Chinese New Year, knowing that Wu Tsing's superstitious beliefs will ensure An-Mei will grow up in favorable conditions.

During the funeral, An-Mei takes her younger half-brother and forces Wu Tsing to honor both them and their deceased mother out of fear of him being haunted by their mother's ghost. The angry Second Wife attempts to dispute her claims and tries to discredit her. An-Mei quickly makes an example of her by destroying the fake pearl necklace that she originally gave to her, which exposes her cruelty and manipulation. This causes the Second Wife to realize that she has lost control of the household and brought trouble on herself, so she backs down. Fearing bad karma on the way, Wu Tsing honors both An-Mei and her brother as his children and their mother as his favorite First Wife.

Ying-Ying St. Clair reveals how her first husband, a womanizer, abandoned her and how she married an American man she did not love after relinquishing her sense of control in her life. She later took back her sense of control when she finally had a talk with Lena and convinced her to leave Harold.

Lindo Jong relates how she arrived in San Francisco and met An-Mei Hsu when they both worked at a fortune-cookie factory, which eventually gave her the means to plant the idea of marriage in her boyfriend's head.

The novel's final episode returns to June, and her mother's desire to find her lost twin daughters. June and her father fly to China, where June meets her half-sisters and embraces her Chinese heritage. In doing so, she was finally able to make peace with Suyuan.

== Characters ==
=== Mothers ===
==== Suyuan Woo ====
During the Second World War, Suyuan lives in the Republic of China while her husband at the time served as an officer in Chungking. She starts the original Joy Luck Club with her three friends to cope with the War. There is little to eat, but they pretend it is a feast, and talk about their hopes for the future. On the day of the Japanese invasion, Suyuan leaves her house with nothing but a bag of clothes, a bag of food, and her twin baby daughters.

During the long journey, Suyuan contracts such severe dysentery that she feels certain she will die. Fearing that a dead mother would doom her babies' chances of rescue, she reluctantly and emotionally leaves her daughters under a barren tree, together with all her belongings, along with a note asking anyone who might find the babies to care for them and contact the father. Suyuan then departs, expecting to die. However, she is rescued by a truck and finds out her husband has died. She later remarries, goes to America, and forms a new Joy Luck Club with three other Chinese female immigrants she met at church. She gives birth to another daughter, but her abandonment of her twin girls haunts her for the rest of her life. After many years, Suyuan learns that the twins were adopted, but dies of a brain aneurysm before she can meet them. It is her American-born daughter Jing-mei who fulfills her long-cherished wish of reuniting with them.

As Suyuan dies before the novel begins, her history is told by Jing-mei, based on her knowledge of her mother's stories, anecdotes from her father, and what the other members of the Joy Luck Club tell her.

==== An-Mei Hsu ====
An-Mei is raised by her grandparents and other relatives during her early years in Ningbo after her widowed mother shocks the family by becoming a concubine to a middle-aged wealthy man after her first husband's death. This becomes a source of conflict for the young An-Mei, as her aunts and uncles deeply resent her mother for such a dishonorable act. They try to convince An-Mei that it is not fitting for her to live with her disgraced mother, who is now forbidden to enter the family home. An-Mei's mother, however, still wishes to be part of her daughter's life. After An-Mei's grandmother dies, An-mei moves out to live with her mother in the home of her mother's new husband, Wu-Tsing, much to the disagreement of her relatives who insists she remains at home with them.

An-Mei learns that her mother was coerced into being Wu-Tsing's concubine through the manipulations of his Second Wife, the favourite. This woman arranged for An-Mei's mother, still in mourning for her original husband, to be raped by Wu-Tsing. When her mother came to her family for their assistance, they cruelly refused and disowned her. The stigma left An-Mei's mother with no choice but to marry Wu-Tsing and become his new but lowly Fourth Wife. She later lost her baby son to Second Wife, who claimed the boy as her own child to ensure her place in the household. Second Wife also tried to win over An-mei upon her arrival in Wu-Tsing's mansion, giving her a necklace made of "pearls" that her mother later revealed were actually glass beads, by crushing one with her teacup. An-Mei's mother re-knots the necklace to hide the missing bead, but now An-Mei knows the truth about Second Wife's seeming generosity.

Wu-Tsing is a highly superstitious man, and Second Wife takes advantage of this weakness by making suicide attempts and threatening to haunt him as a ghost if he does not let her have her way. According to Chinese tradition, a person's soul comes back after three days to settle scores with the living. Wu-Tsing, therefore, is known to be afraid to face the ghost of an angry or scorned wife. After Second Wife fakes a suicide attempt to prevent An-Mei and her mother from getting their own small house, An-Mei's mother kills herself, eating tangyuan laced with lethal amounts of opium. Also taking advantage of Wu Tsing's beliefs, she times her death so that her soul is due to return on the first day of the Lunar New Year, a day when all debts must be settled lest the debtor suffer great misfortune. An-Mei takes her younger brother's arm and demands that Wu Tsing honor them and her mother or face great consequences. When Second Wife attempts to dispute this at the funeral rites, An-Mei quickly makes an example of her and shows her awareness of Second Wife's deceptions by crushing the fake pearl necklace under her feet. This symbolizes her new power over the woman who made her mother's life miserable. She did this by abusing her and taking her brother away. Now fearing An-Mei, Second Wife realizes the bad karma she has brought upon herself and backs down, having lost control of the house. With this in mind, Wu-Tsing promises to treat his Fourth Wife's children, including An-Mei, as if they were his very own flesh and blood and their mother as his honored First Wife.

An-Mei later immigrates to America, marries, and gives birth to seven children (four sons, three daughters). The youngest, a son named Bing, drowns at age four.

==== Lindo Jong ====
Lindo is a strong-willed woman, a trait that her daughter Waverly attributes to her having been born in the year of the Horse. When Lindo was only twelve, she was forced to move in with a neighbor's young son, Huang Tyan Yu, through the machinations of the village matchmaker. After some training for household duties through her in-laws, she and Tyan-yu married when she turned sixteen. She soon realized that her husband was a mere boy at heart and had no sexual interest in her. It is loosely implied that he might have been gay. Lindo began to care for her husband as a brother, but her cruel mother-in-law expected Lindo to produce a grandson. She restricted most of Lindo's daily activities, eventually ordering her to remain on bed rest until she could conceive and deliver a child.

Determined to escape this unfortunate situation, Lindo carefully observed the other people in the household and eventually formed a clever plan to escape her marriage without dishonoring herself, her family and her in-laws. She managed to convince her in-laws that Huang Tyan Yu was actually fated to marry another girl who was already pregnant with his "spiritual child", and that her own marriage to him would only bring bad luck to the family. The girl she described as his destined wife was, in fact, a mere servant in the household, indeed pregnant but abandoned by her lover. Seeing this as an opportunity for her to be married and live comfortably, the servant girl cheerfully agreed with Lindo.

Freed from her first marriage, Lindo decided to immigrate to America. She married a Chinese American man named Tin Jong and has three children: sons Winston and Vincent, and daughter Waverly.

Lindo experiences regret over losing some of her Chinese identity by living so long in America (she is treated like a tourist on a visit to China); however, she expresses concern that Waverly's American upbringing has formed a barrier between them.

==== Ying-Ying "Betty" St. Clair ====
From a young age, Ying-Ying is told by her wealthy and conservative family that Chinese girls should be meek and gentle. This is especially difficult for her, as she feels it out of step with her character as a Tiger. She begins to develop a passive personality and represses her feelings as she grows up in Wuxi. Ying-Ying marries a charismatic man named Lin Xiao not out of love, but because she believed it was her fate. Her husband is revealed to be abusive and openly has extramarital affairs with other women. When Ying-Ying discovers she is pregnant, she has an abortion. She then decides to live with her relatives in a smaller city in China.

After ten years, she moves to Shanghai and works in a clothing store, where she meets an American man named Clifford St. Clair. He falls in love with her, but Ying-Ying cannot express any strong emotion after her first marriage. He courts her for four years, and she agrees to marry him after learning that Lin Xiao had died, which she takes as the proper sign to move on. She allows Clifford to control most aspects of her life; he mistranslates her words and actions, and even changes her name to "Betty". Ying-Ying gives birth to her daughter, Lena, after moving to San Francisco with St. Clair. When Lena is around ten years old, Ying-Ying becomes pregnant a third time, but the baby boy is anencephalic and soon dies.

Ying-Ying is horrified when she realises that Lena, a Tiger like herself, has inherited or emulated her passive behaviors and trapped herself in a loveless marriage with a controlling husband. She finally resolves to call upon the more assertive qualities of her Tiger nature, to appeal to those qualities in Lena. She will tell Lena her story in the hope that she will be able to break free from the same passivity that ruined most of her young life back in China.

=== Daughters ===
==== Jing-Mei "June" Woo ====
Jing-Mei, commonly called "June", has never fully understood her mother and seems directionless in life. During June's childhood, her mother used to tell her that she could be anything she wants; however, she particularly wanted her daughter to be gifted, a child star who amazes the world, like Ginny Tiu (seen briefly on television) or June's rival Waverly. At the beginning of the novel, June is chosen to replace her mother's seat in the Joy Luck Club after her mother's death. At the end of the novel, June is still trying to deal with her mother's death, and she visits China to see the twin half-sisters (Wang Chwun Yu and Wang Chwun Hwa) whom her mother had been forced to abandon when the Japanese attacked China. Only when she visits China to meet her half-sisters and tell them about their mother, June finally accepts her Chinese heritage and makes her peace with her mother.

Lilia Melani of City University of New York has suggested that the reason for the communication gap between June and her mother, and between the other daughters and their mothers—a major theme of the novel—occurs because the mothers come from a high context culture and the Americanized daughters from a low context culture. The mothers believe that the daughters will intuitively understand their cryptic utterances, but the daughters don't understand them at all.

==== Rose Hsu Jordan ====
Rose is somewhat passive and is a bit of a perfectionist. She had an unsettling childhood experience when her youngest brother, Bing, drowned while she was supposed to be watching him, and his body was never recovered. Rose marries a doctor, Ted Jordan, who loves her but also wants to spite his snooty, racist mother. After a malpractice suit, Ted has a mid-life crisis and decides to leave Rose. Rose confides in her mother and An-mei tells her the story of her own childhood. When Ted comes for the divorce papers, Rose finds her voice and tells him that he can't just throw her out of his life, comparing herself to his garden, once so beloved, now unkempt and full of weeds. An-Mei tells her that Ted has been cheating on her, which Rose thinks is absurd, but she later discovers this to be true. She hires a good lawyer and fights for possession of the house, which she eventually wins. This forces Ted to take Rose more seriously and not continue taking her for granted. It's unknown if they ever reconciled.

==== Waverly Jong ====
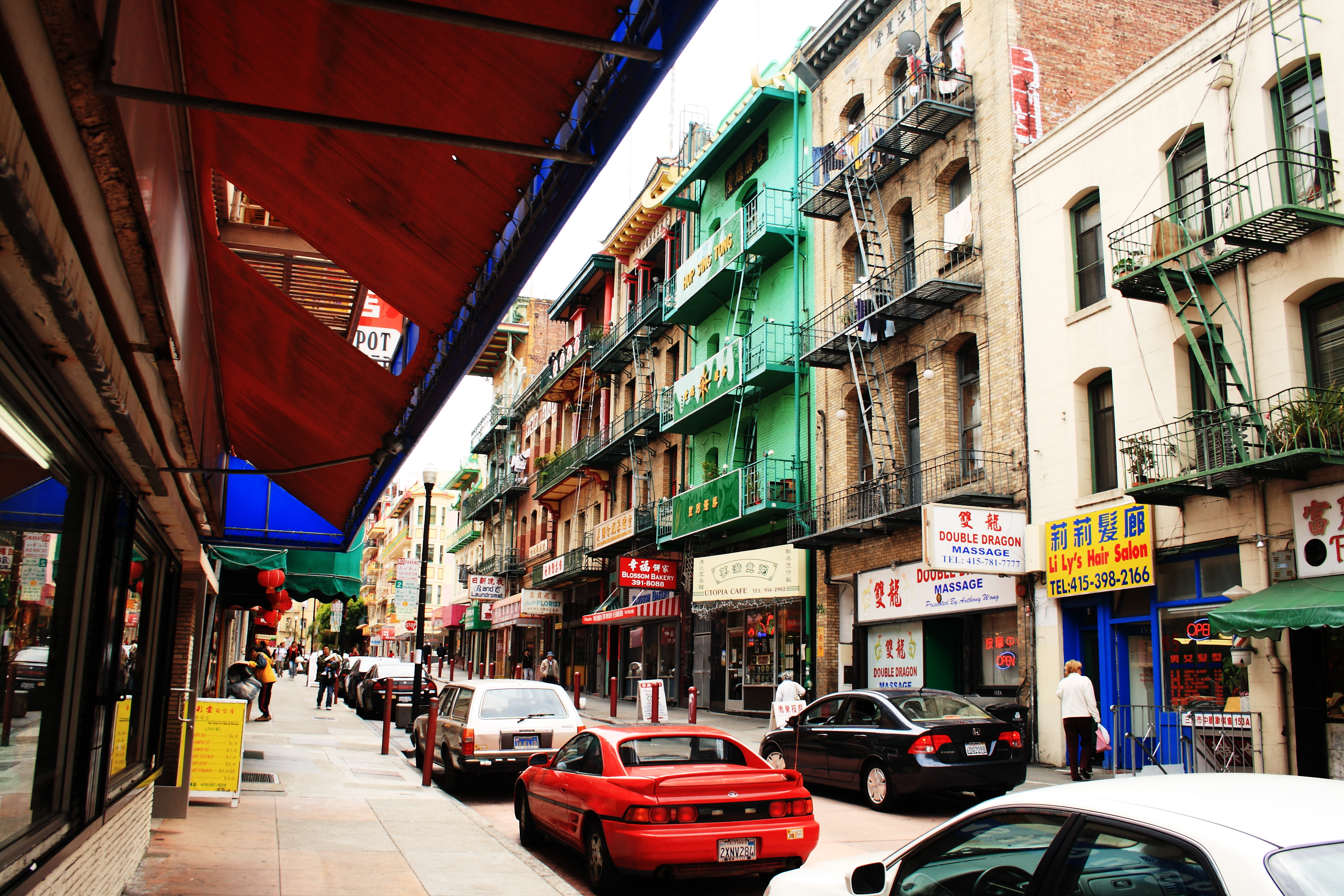
Waverly Jong is named for (and grew up on) Waverly Place in San Francisco's Chinatown

Waverly is an independent-minded and intelligent woman, but is annoyed by her mother's constant criticism. Well into her adult life, she finds herself restrained by her subconscious fear of letting her mother down. During their childhood, June and Waverly become childhood rivals; their mothers constantly compared their daughters' development and accomplishments. Waverly was once a gifted chess champion, but quit after feeling that her mother was using her daughter's talent to show off, taking credit for Waverly's wins. Waverly does not necessarily understand the origin of her mother's comments or what context for which they are intended. Waverly is “unable to feel at home in… [her] relationship with [her] mother."

She has a daughter, Shoshana, from her first marriage with Marvin Chen, and she is engaged to her boyfriend Rich Schields. When Waverly believes that Lindo will object to her engagement to Rich after a failed dinner party, she discovers her mother had already accepted it.

==== Lena St. Clair ====
Throughout Lena's childhood, she gradually becomes her mother's voice and interprets her mother's Chinese words for others. Like her father Clifford, she translates Ying-ying's words to sound more pleasant than what Ying-ying actually says. Ying-ying has taught Lena to beware of consequences, to the extent that Lena visualizes disaster in the taking of any risk. Lena's husband, Harold, is also her boss. He takes the credit for Lena's business and design ideas. He demands financial "equality" in their marriage. Lena is an associate while Harold is a partner, so he has a larger salary than she does. However, he insists that all household expenses be divided equally between them. Harold believes that by making everything equal, they can make their love equal as well. Lena feels frustrated and powerless. She settles for what Harold tells her is right: “in Chinese society…the man is the one who creates the rules and the woman… has no choice [except] obeying these rules." Harold's act of dictatorship over Lena could be the reason for her created self-doubt: "in…patriarchy, men possess the highest status... so that women's position is subordinate to them." She is like her mother, like a ghost, and her mother wants to help her regain her spirit and stand up for herself. When Ying-Ying breaks a leg from a table belonging to Harold, Lena finally admitted she's unhappy in her marriage including how frustrated she is with him for taking credit for her business and design ideas. Ying-Ying encourages her to leave Harold and not come back until he treats her with more respect.

== Themes ==
=== Tension between filial piety and U.S. individualism ===
In the novel, the mother’s belief in filial piety, which stems from Chinese Confucianism, often conflicts with their daughters’ pursuit of an American sense of independence. Shaped by the hardships and traditions they still hold, the mother sees obedience, discipline, and academic success as a standard of family pride. On the other hand, the daughters, who are raised and shaped by the United States, put freedom and personal choice as their top beliefs. These two “opposite” views collide within families, twisting love into misunderstanding.

Suyuan Woo’s relationship with her daughter Jing-mei shows this conflict most clearly. Having survived war and loss, Suyuan holds a deep belief that strictness ensures survival. “Only two kinds of daughters,” she tells Jing-mei, “those who are obedient and those who follow their own mind. Only one kind of daughter can live in this house—obedient daughter”. She believes that obedience is a show of love and gratitude. However, Jing-mei sees obedience as pressure. She tries to obey her mother and works hard to become a “child prodigy”, but soon loses confidence after failure. “Something inside me began to die,” she admits. When she looks at herself in the mirror and sees “an angry, powerful girl,” she promises, “I won’t let her change me. I won’t be what I’m not”. This is the moment that marks her rejection of blind obedience and the start of her search for her own identity and meaning.

Meantime, Waverly Jong faces similar tensions with her mother, Lindo. Having winning chess champions and being praised as a “child prodigy” when she was little, she became the symbol of her mother’s pride and success. But Lindo’s pride turns into control. “Why do you have to use me to show off?” Waverly asks at one point, as she cannot take her mother’s show off anymore. Her anger reveals her confusion about why love and pride become burdens.

Apart from different beliefs, the distance between mothers and daughters widens through language and memories. On one side, the mothers speak fragmented English and hold onto old memories of China. On the other side, the daughters speak fluent English and hold beliefs shaped by American life, and often see their mothers as overbearing. Although Chinese mothers have a lot of things to say to their American daughters, their broken English tongue is holding them back so that they can't make sense of it; at the same time, the daughters who have almost lost the ability to speak Chinese can't understand their own mothers, and ultimately, the mothers and daughters can only stand on both sides of the river and look at each other. Each side mistreads the other, and the cracks between them grow wider with the accumulation of miscommunication.

By the end of the novel, Tan shows that the two seemingly “opposite” values can coexist. When Jing-mei travels to China after finally finding her half-sisters, she begins to understand her mother’s hope as acts of love, not domination, as she used to think. What part of me is Chinese... it is my family”. In the moment of seeing her half-sister, she sees the connections between the two worlds that shaped her. She finally realized that Chinese and American values do not cancel each other out. Instead, they can live together within the same identity.

=== Silence as an inherited trauma ===
Silence is one of the keywords expressed throughout the novel by both the mothers and daughters. The mothers learn to stay silent when facing the pain of loss, war, survival, and migration. That silence was passed on to their daughters, shaping how they deal with conflict and love.

Rose Hsu Jordan’s story shows how this kind of silence can turn into self-erasure. Having been taught by her mother An-mei, she learnt to “swallow other people’s misery, to eat” her “own bitterness”, and she grew up believing that strength means endurance. In her marriage to Ted, this belief leads her to stay silent and avoid disagreement. “There were no more discussions. Ted simply decided. And I never thought of objecting”. Rose stays quiet to keep the peace. But things don’t go as she wishes, no matter her great sacrifice of her independence and self-worth. When Ted asks for a divorce, she is left with no voice of her own.

Similarly, Lena St. Clair also repeats her mother’s quiet suffering. As a child, she watched her mother, Ying-ying, hide her sadness and develop a belief that love means restraint and stepping back. This belief follows her stepping into adulthood, when she marries her husband, Harold, whom Lena sees as a “god”. She steps back and lets Harold take control of everything, including their finances and even decisions. “I worried that all this undeserved good fortune would someday slip away,” she admits. Her gratitude masks her fear of losing love. Like her mother, Lena learns to remain silent rather than risk confrontation.

Tan shows that this silence is not a form of weakness but a form of inherited trauma. The mothers’ quiet endurance once protected them, so they want their daughter to inherit the same trait. But they soon realize that it leaves their daughters unprepared for a culture that rewards self-assertion. So they use their own ways to encourage their daughter to break the silence. When the daughters finally begin to speak for themselves, everything they once sacrificed comes back to them.

Through Rose’s and Lena’s stories, Tan shows how silence can be passed down through generations and how the cycle can be broken. As the daughters find their voices, they reshape their mothers’ legacy rather than simply resisting it.

=== Marriage and assimilation ===
Tan portrays marriage as a way for the daughters to test how far they can “escape” from their mother’s world. The daughters see marrying white American men as a sign of freedom and assimilation into the United States, since they believe that these relationships promise entries into the American middle class and can release them from the expectations tied to being “Chinese”, which allow them to feel accepted in a culture that has often marked them as outsiders.

Waverly Jong views her relationship with her fiancé, Rich, as proof that she has built a life different from her mother’s. She believes that choosing a white partner is a way of showing independence and modernity. However, she still worries about Lindo’s judgement. When Rich fails to follow Chinese table manners at a family dinner, Waverly feels shame. Her discomfort shows that even if she thought she had escaped from her mother, Chinese cultural expectations that she hoped to leave behind still silently follows her around. Even in a romantic relationship with Rich, she still measures herself through her mother’s words and eyes.

Similarly, Rose Hsu Jordan also marries with a hope of escaping her background. She is deeply attracted by Ted’s confidence and American style upbringing because they represent the opposite of her own quiet, cautious childhood life. She sees her marriage as a way to gain a new identity, an outspoken, self-assured American. However, her high hope fades overtime as her silence and Ted’s authority recreate the same balance she once associated with her mother. Tan uses her marriage as a message that assimilation built on denial of heritage will always lend to a loss of self rather than freedom once to hope.

Lena St. Clair’s relationship with Harold continues Rose and Waverly’s pattern. She admires Harold’s independence and his belief in equality, but soon discovers that his version of “equality” still suppresses her from being herself. She tries to follow his rules as she wants to fit into his world. Her willingness to adjust, even when it costs her comfort and even potential loss of her own identity, shows how easily the desire to assimilate at the cost of leaving behind one’s heritage values can turn into quiet conformity, which is often dangerous.

Through telling stories of these women, Tan exemplifies how the urge of assimilation can disguise itself as love. The daughters believe that marriage to white men can turn them from Chinese to American, and free them from their mothers’ influence. Instead, they soon find themselves struggling with power and identity. Only when they begin to accept their own cultural roots do they start to redefine what belonging and partnerships truly mean.

== Reception ==
The Joy Luck Club received widespread critical and popular acclaim upon its release in 1989. Reviewers praised Amy Tan’s lyrical prose, interwoven storytelling, and emotional insight into the relationships between Chinese immigrant mothers and their American-born daughters.

Carolyn See of the Los Angeles Times called it “astonishingly accomplished” and wrote, “The only negative thing I could ever say about this book is that I’ll never again be able to read it for the first time.” Publishers Weekly described it as “intensely poetic, startlingly imaginative, and moving,” while Kirkus Reviews lauded it as “a splendid first novel” rich with humanity and empathy. The novel became a longtime bestseller, was a finalist for the National Book Award and the National Book Critics Circle Award, and helped bring Asian American literature to a wide readership for the first time.

The book’s success also prompted later critical discussion within Asian American literary circles about questions of cultural representation and authenticity. In the 1990s, some scholars—including Frank Chin and Sau-ling Cynthia Wong—argued that the novel’s depictions of Chinese culture could be read as reinforcing certain stereotypes or catering to Western expectations. Other critics countered that Tan’s work should be seen as an exploration of diaspora identity and intergenerational misunderstanding rather than as ethnographic realism.

Despite these debates, The Joy Luck Club has remained widely studied and celebrated for its artistry and its role in broadening the visibility of Asian American voices in U.S. literature.
