= Passenger (disambiguation) =

A passenger is a passive traveler in a vehicle.

Passenger(s) or The Passenger(s) may also refer to:

== Literature ==
- Passenger (Posmysz novel), by Zofia Posmysz, 1962, basis for the 1963 film and the 1968 opera
- Passenger (Keneally novel), 1979, by Thomas Keneally
- "Passengers" (short story), by Robert Silverberg, 1968
- "The Passenger" (short story), by Vladimir Nabokov, 1927
- The Passenger (Boschwitz novel), by Ulrich Alexander Boschwitz, 1938
- The Passenger (McCarthy novel), by Cormac McCarthy, 2022
- The Passenger, a 2006 novel by Chris Petit
- "The Passenger", a 2012 horror story by Arinn Dembo

== Film and television ==
=== Film ===
- The Passenger (1928 film), a French silent film by Jacques de Baroncelli
- The Passenger (1949 film), a French comedy by Jacques Daroy
- Passenger (1963 film), a Polish drama by Andrzej Munk
- The Passenger (1975 film), a drama by Michelangelo Antonioni
- The Passengers (1977 film), a French film by Serge Leroy
- The Passenger – Welcome to Germany, a 1988 drama by Thomas Brasch
- The Passengers (1999 film), a French film by Jean-Claude Guiguet
- Passengers (2003 film), an Indian documentary by Akanksha Damini Joshi
- The Passenger (2005 Éric Caravaca film), a French film
- The Passenger (2005 François Rotger film), a French-Canadian-Japanese film
- Passengers (2008 film), an American-Canadian thriller by Rodrigo Garcia
- Passenger (2009 film), an Indian Malayalam thriller by Ranjit Shankar
- Passengers (2016 film), an American science fiction film
- The Passenger (2021 film), a Spanish science fiction film
- The Passenger (2023 American film), a horror-thriller road trip film by Carter Smith
- The Passenger (2023 Ugandan film), a drama by Hadijah Nakanjako
- Passenger (2026 film), a horror film by André Øvredal
- The Passenger (2026 film), an American thriller by Vadim Perelman

=== Television ===
- Passengers (British TV series), a mid-1990s and early-2000s British Channel 4 series about youth culture
- Passengers (Russian TV series)
- The Passenger (Hong Kong TV series), a 1979 Hong Kong drama series
- Passenger (2024 British TV series)
- "Chapter 10: The Passenger", an episode of The Mandalorian
- "The Passenger" (Star Trek: Deep Space Nine), an episode
- "The Passenger" (Westworld), an episode
- Tulip Olsen, or the Passenger, a character in the television series Infinity Train

== Music ==
=== Performers ===
- Passenger (singer) (born 1984), British folk-rock singer-songwriter Mike Rosenberg
  - Passenger (British band), a folk-rock band previously fronted by Mike Rosenberg
- Passenger (Swedish band), a metal band
- Passenger, a pseudonym used by Tiësto for the 1997 single "Blackspin"; see Tiësto discography#Singles
- Passengers (side project), formed by Brian Eno and U2 for the 1995 album Original Soundtracks 1
- Passengers (Italian band), a 1980s italo disco band
- The Passengers (band), a 1970s Belgian new wave band
- The Passengers, a 1980s Australian band led by Angie Pepper

=== Albums ===
- Passenger (Lisa Hannigan album) or the title song, 2011
- Passenger (Nico Touches the Walls album) or the title song, 2011
- Passenger (Mnemic album), 2007
- Passenger (Passenger album), 2003
- Passenger (Tara MacLean album) or the title song, 2000
- Passengers (Gary Burton album), 1977
- Passengers (soundtrack), from the 2008 film
- Passengers, by Mostly Autumn, 2003

=== Songs ===
- "Passenger" (Alex Warren song), 2026
- "Passenger" (Powderfinger song), 1999
- "Passenger" (Grateful Dead song), 1977
- "The Passenger" (Iggy Pop song), by Iggy Pop, 1977
- "Passengers" (Elton John song), 1984
- "Passenger", by Britney Spears from Britney Jean, 2013
- "Passenger", by Deftones from White Pony, 2000
- "Passenger", by Destroy Lonely from If Looks Could Kill, 2023
- "Passenger", by DY, 2009
- "Passenger", by Hippo Campus from Bambi, 2018
- "Passenger", by Interpol from The Other Side of Make-Believe, 2022
- "Passenger", by OneRepublic from Waking Up, 2009
- "Passenger", by Trapt from DNA, 2016
- "Passengers", by Starflyer 59 from Old, 2003
- "The Passenger", by Kings of Convenience from Quiet Is the New Loud, 2001

=== Other uses in music ===
- Passenger Records, a New York-based record label
- The Passenger (opera), by Mieczysław Weinberg, 1968

== Other uses ==
- The Passenger (moth) or Dysgonia algira, a moth species
- The Passenger (Sapphire & Steel), a 2005 audio drama
- Phusion Passenger, a free web server and application server
- Passenger (retailer), a UK clothing brand
