= List of compositions by Mieczysław Weinberg =

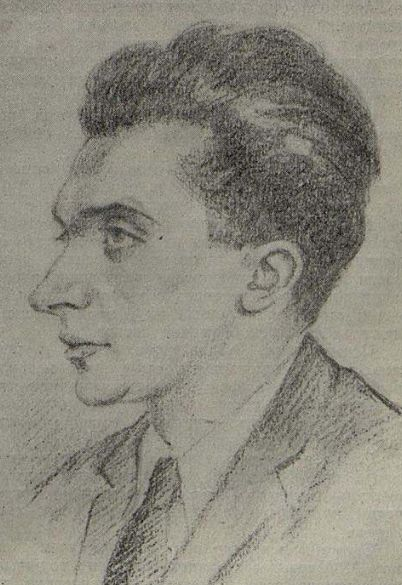
Pencil portrait of Weinberg, January 1949

This is a list of compositions by Mieczysław Weinberg by opus number.

== List of works ==
- WoO: Two Mazurkas (1933)
- WoO: Three Pieces for violin and piano (1934)
- Op. 1: Lullaby for piano (1935)
- Op. 2: String Quartet No. 1 (1937) [see also Op. 141]
- Op. 3: String Quartet No. 2 (1940) [see also Op. 145]
- Op. 4: Acacias, six romances after J. Tuwim for singer and piano (1940)
- Op. 5: Piano Sonata No. 1 (1940)
- Op. 6: Symphonic Poem for orchestra (1941)
- Op. 7: Three Romances after J. Rivina and A. Prokofiev (1941)
- Op. 8: Piano Sonata No. 2 (1942)
- WoO: Comrades in Arms, operetta (1942)
- WoO: Clarettes Career, operetta (1942)
- Op. 9: Aria for string quartet (1942)
- WoO: Battle for the Fatherland, ballet (1942)
- WoO: The Sword of Uzbekistan, opera (1942)
- Op. 10: Symphony No. 1 (1942)
- Op. 11: Capriccio for string quartet (1943)
- Op. 12: Sonata No. 1 for violin and piano (1943)
- Op. 13: Children's Songs after I.L. Peretz for singer and piano (1943)
- Op. 14: String Quartet No. 3 (1944)
- Op. 15: Sonata No. 2 for violin and piano (1944)
- Op. 16: Children's Notebook No. 1 for piano (1944)
- Op. 17: Jewish Songs after Shmuel Halkin (1944)
- Op. 18: Piano Quintet (1944)
- Op. 19: Children's Notebook No. 2 for piano (1944)
- Op. 20: String Quartet No. 4 (1945)
- Op. 21: Sonata No. 1 for cello and piano in C major (1945)
- Op. 22: Three Romances after A. Mickiewicz for singer and piano (1945)
- Op. 23: Children's Notebook No. 3 for piano (1945)
- Op. 24: Piano Trio (1945)
- WoO: Fantasy on Themes from Adolphe Adam's opera Le chalet for orchestra (1945)
- Op. 25: Six Romances after F. Tyutchev for singer and piano (1945)
- Op. 26: Suite for small orchestra (1939–1945)
- Op. 27: String Quartet No. 5 (1945)
- Op. 28: Sonata for clarinet (or viola) and piano (1945)
- Op. 29: Twelve Miniatures for flute and piano (1946)
- Op. 30: Symphony No. 2 for string orchestra (1946)
- Op. 31: Piano Sonata No. 3 (1946)
- Op. 32: Elegy after F. Schiller for baritone and piano (1946)
- Op. 33: Six Sonettes after W. Shakespeare for bass and piano (1946)
- Op. 34: Twenty-One Easy Pieces for piano (1946)
- Op. 35: String Quartet No. 6 (1946)
- Op. 36: Festive Scenes for orchestra (1946–1947)
- Op. 37: Sonata No. 3 for violin and piano (1947)
- Op. 38: Four Romances after Maksym Rylsky and G. Nikolayeva for singer and piano (1947)
- Op. 39: Sonata No. 4 for violin and piano (1947)
- Op. 40: Two Ballet Suites for orchestra (1947)
- WoO: Two Choruses for male chorus a cappella (1948)
- Op. 41: Sinfonietta No. 1 (1948)
- Op. 42: Concertino for violin and string orchestra (1948)
- Op. 43bis: Concertino for cello and orchestra in C minor (1948)
- Op. 43: Concerto for cello and orchestra in C minor (1948)
- Op. 44: Greetings Overture for orchestra (1949)
- Op. 45: Symphony No. 3 (1949)
- Op. 46: Sonatina for violin and piano in D major (1949)
- Op. 47 No. 1: Rhapsody on Moldavian Themes for orchestra (1949)
- Op. 47 No. 2: Polish Tunes for orchestra (1949)
- Op. 47 No. 3: Moldavian Rhapsody for violin and orchestra (1949)
- Op. 47 No. 4: Serenada for orchestra (1949)
- WoO: Portraits of Friends for piano (1950)
- WoO: Improvisation for string quartet (1950)
- WoO: Suite for orchestra (1950)
- Op. 48: String Trio (1950)
- WoO: Rhapsody on Slavonic Themes for orchestra (1950)
- Op. 49: Sonatina for piano (1951)
- WoO: March for orchestra (1952)
- WoO: Kujawiak and Oberek for two xylophones and orchestra (1952)
- Op. 50: At the Source of the Past, songcycle after Alexander Blok for mezzo-soprano and piano (1951)
- Op. 51: In the Homeland, cantata after poems of Soviet children for boys-alto, boys chorus, mixed chorus and orchestra (1952)
- WoO: Overture for orchestra (1953)
- Op. 52: Fantasy for cello and orchestra (1951–1953)
- Op. 53: Sonata No. 5 for violin and piano (1953)
- Op. 54: Partita for piano (1954)
- Op. 55: The Golden Key, ballet in six scenes, after Alexey Tolstoy (a free adaptation of the Pinocchio tale) (1954–1955)
- Op. 55A: Suite No. 1 from the ballet The Golden Key (1964)
- Op. 55B: Suite No. 2 from the ballet The Golden Key (1964)
- Op. 55C: Suite No. 3 from the ballet The Golden Key (1964)
- Op. 55D: Suite No. 4 from the ballet The Golden Key (1964)
- Op. 56: Piano Sonata No. 4 in B minor (1955)
- Op. 57: Bible of the Gypsies, seven romances after J. Tuwim for mezzo-soprano and piano (1956)
- Op. 58: Piano Sonata No. 5 (1956)
- Op. 59: String Quartet No. 7 (1957)
- Op. 60: Morning-Red, symphonic poem for orchestra (1957)
- Op. 61: Symphony No. 4 in A minor (1957) (Revised in 1961)
- Op. 62: Memories after J. Tuwim for middle-voice and piano (1957–1958)
- Op. 63: Sonata for cello and piano No. 2 in g minor (1958–1959)
- Op. 64: The White Chrysantheme, ballet in three acts after A. Rumnev and J. Romanovich (1958)
- Op. 65: In the Armenian Mountains after H. Tumanyan for singer and piano (1958)
- Op. 66: String Quartet No. 8 (1959)
- Op. 67: Violin Concerto in G minor (1959)
- WoO: Twelve Months, suite from the film (1959)
- Op. 68: Symphonic Songs for orchestra (1959) (Revised from 1951 version)
- Op. 69: Sonata for two violins (1959)
- Op. 70: Seven Romances after Sándor Petőfi, for tenor and piano (1960)
- Op. 71: Seven Romances after various poets for singer and piano (1940-1972)
- Op. 72: Sonata No. 1 for cello solo (1960)
- Op. 73: Piano Sonata No. 6 (1960)
- Op. 74: Sinfonietta No. 2 for string orchestra and timpani (1960)
- Op. 75: Concerto for flute and string orchestra (1961)
- Op. 76: Symphony No. 5 in F minor (1962)
- Op. 77: Old Letters after J. Tuwim for soprano and piano (1962)
- Op. 78: Three romances after V. Sosnora, Y. Vinokurov and A. Yashin for singer and piano (1962)
- Op. 79: Symphony No. 6 after Leib Kvitko, Shmuel Halkin and M. Lukonin for boys' chorus and orchestra (1962–1963)
- Op. 80: String Quartet No. 9 (1963)
- Op. 81: Symphony No. 7 in C major for strings and harpsichord (1964)
- Op. 82: Sonata No. 1 for violin solo (1964)
- Op. 83: Symphony No. 8 Flowers of Poland after J. Tuwim for tenor, mixed chorus and orchestra (1964)
- Op. 84: Oh, Grey Fog, romance after J. Tuwim for bass and piano (1964)
- Op. 85: String Quartet No. 10 (1964)
- Op. 86: Sonata No. 2 for cello solo (1965)
- Op. 87: The Diary of Love, cantata after S. Vygodski for tenor, boys' chorus and chamber orchestra (1965)
- Op. 88: The Profile, song cycle after S. Vydodski for bass and piano (1965)
- Op. 89: String Quartet No. 11 (1965–1966)
- Op. 90: Words in Blood, song cycle after J. Tuwim for tenor and piano (1965)
- Op. 91: Piotr Plaksin, cantata after J. Tuwim for tenor, alto and nineteen instruments (1965)
- Op. 92: Hiroshima, cantata after Fukagawa for mixed chorus and orchestra (1966)
- Op. 93: Symphony No. 9 Everlasting Times after J. Tuwim and V. Bronievsky for narrator, chorus and orchestra (1940–1967)
- Op. 94: Concerto for trumpet and orchestra in B flat major (1966–1967)
- Op. 95: Sonata No. 2 for violin solo (1967)
- Op. 96: Requiem after D. Kedrin, M. Dudin, F. Garcia Lorca, Fukagawa and others for soprano, children's chorus, mixed chorus and orchestra (1965–1967)
- Op. 97: The Traveller, (more commonly known as The Passenger), opera in two acts (1967–1968)
- Op. 98: Symphony No. 10 in A minor (1968)
- Op. 99: Triptychon after L. Staff for bass and orchestra (1968)
- Op. 100: Twenty-four Preludes for cello solo (1968)
- Op. 101: Symphony No. 11 Festive Symphony after various revolutionary poets for chorus and orchestra (1969)
- Op. 102: Nobody had known, poem after Demyan Bedny for soprano, chorus and orchestra (1970)
- Op. 103: String Quartet No. 12 (1969–1970)
- Op. 104: Concerto for clarinet and string orchestra (1970)
- WoO: Zosya, opera (1970)
- Op. 105: The Madonna and the Soldier, opera in three acts after A. Medvedev (1970)
- Op. 106: Sonata No. 3 for cello solo (1971)
- Op. 107: Sonata No. 1 for viola solo (1971)
- Op. 108: Sonata No. 1 for double-bass solo (1971)
- Op. 109: The Love of d'Artagnan, opera after A. Dumas (1971)
- Op. 110: When I sing this child asleep, song-cycle after G. Mistral for soprano and piano (1973)
- Op. 111: Congratulations!, opera in one act after Sholom Aleichem's play Mazltov! (1975)
- Op. 112: Lady Magnesia, opera in one act after G.B. Shaw (1975)
- Op. 113: Six Ballet Scenes: Choreographic Symphony for orchestra (1973–1975)
- Op. 114: Symphony No. 12 In memoriam D. Shostakovich (1975–1976)
- Op. 115: Symphony No. 13 (1976)
- Op. 116: From the Lyrics of Zhukovsky, songcycle after V. Zhukovsky for bass and piano (1976)
- Op. 117: Symphony No. 14 (1977)
- Op. 118: String Quartet No. 13 (1977)
- Op. 119: Symphony No. 15 I Believe in This Earth after M. Dudin for soprano, baritone, women's chorus and orchestra (1977)
- Op. 120: Three Palmtrees after M. Lermontov for soprano and string quartet (1977)
- Op. 121: Sonata No. 2 for cello solo (second version, 1977)
- Op. 122: String Quartet No. 14 (1978)
- Op. 123: Sonata No. 2 for viola solo (1978)
- Op. 124: String Quartet No. 15 (1979)
- Op. 125: From the Lyrics of Baratinsky, songcycle after Y. Baratynsky for bass and piano (1979)
- Op. 126: Sonata No. 3 for violin solo (1979)
- Op. 127: Trio for flute, harp and viola (1979)
- Op. 128: The Portrait, opera in eight scenes after N. Gogol (1980)
- Op. 129: The Golden Dress, operetta after E. Galperina (1980)
- Op. 130: String Quartet No. 16 (1981)
- Op. 131: Symphony no. 16 (1981)
- Op. 132: The Relic, recitative for bass and piano
- Op. 133: Sonata for bassoon solo
- Op. 134: From Afanasy Fet's Poetry, songs for bass and piano
- Op. 135: Sonata No. 3 for viola solo (1982)
- Op. 136: Sonata No. 4 for viola solo (1983)
- Op. 136bis: Sonata No. 6 for violin and piano (1982)
- Op. 137: Symphony No. 17 Memory (1984)
- Op. 138: Symphony No. 18 War, there is no word more cruel (1986)
- Op. 139: Six Children's Songs for voice and piano (1986)
- Op. 140: Sonata No. 4 for solo cello (1986)
- Op. 141: String Quartet No. 1 (1986) (Recomposition of Op. 2)
- Op. 142: Symphony No. 19 The Bright May (1986)
- Op. 143: The Banners of Peace, symphonic poem (1986)
- Op. 144: The Idiot, opera after F. Dostoyevsky (1985)
- Op. 145: Chamber Symphony No. 1 (1987) (arranged from String Quartet No. 2, Op. 3)
- Op. 146: String Quartet No. 17 (1987)
- Op. 147: Chamber Symphony No. 2 (1987)
- Op. 148: Flute Concerto No. 2 (1987)
- Op. 149: Music to the Film The Tale of the Love for a Painter (1987)
- Op. 150: Symphony No. 20 (1988)
- Op. 151: Chamber Symphony No. 3 (1991)
- Op. 152: Symphony No. 21 ("Kaddish") (1991)
- Op. 153: Chamber Symphony No. 4 (1992)
- Op. 154: Symphony No. 22 (1993-94, orchestrated by Kirill Umansky in 2003)
