= Op. 105 =

In music, Op. 105 stands for Opus number 105. Compositions that are assigned this number include:

- Dvořák – String Quartet No. 14
- Mendelssohn – Piano Sonata No. 2
- Schumann – Violin Sonata No. 1
- Shostakovich – Moscow, Cheryomushki
- Sibelius – Symphony No. 7 in C major (1924, in one movement)
- Weinberg – The Madonna and the Soldier
