= The Madonna and the Soldier =

Opera by Mieczysław Weinberg

- Opera by Mieczysław Weinberg
- Native title: Russian: Мадонна и солдат
- Librettist: Alexander Medvedev
- Language: Russian

The Madonna and the Soldier (Russian: «Мадонна и солдат», Madonna i soldat, Op. 105) is an opera by Mieczysław Weinberg to a libretto by Alexander Medvedev composed in 1970. The Madonna and the Soldier was Weinberg's second opera, following The Passenger and preceding Dartagnan's Love. Shostakovich in reviewing these three first operas, wrote of the composer that "in turning to this new genre, Weinberg has shown himself to be a mature master of the operatic form."
