= Passenger (Posmysz novel) =

1962 novel by Zofia Posmysz

First edition (publ. Czytelnik)

Passenger (Polish: Pasażerka) is a 1962 novel by Polish writer Zofia Posmysz, which originated from a radio drama Passenger from Cabin Number 45, written in 1959. The novel was translated from Polish into Hungarian, (1963), Czech (1964), Russian (1964), Bulgarian (1965), Slovak (1965), Latvian (1966), Lithuanian (1966), Moldovan (1966), Romanian (1967), German (1969), Japanese (1971), Ukrainian (1972) and Kazakh (1986).

Andrzej Munk's 1963 film Passenger and Mieczysław Weinberg's 1968 opera The Passenger are based on this work.
