= Deutsch-Polnische Gesellschaft Bundesverband =

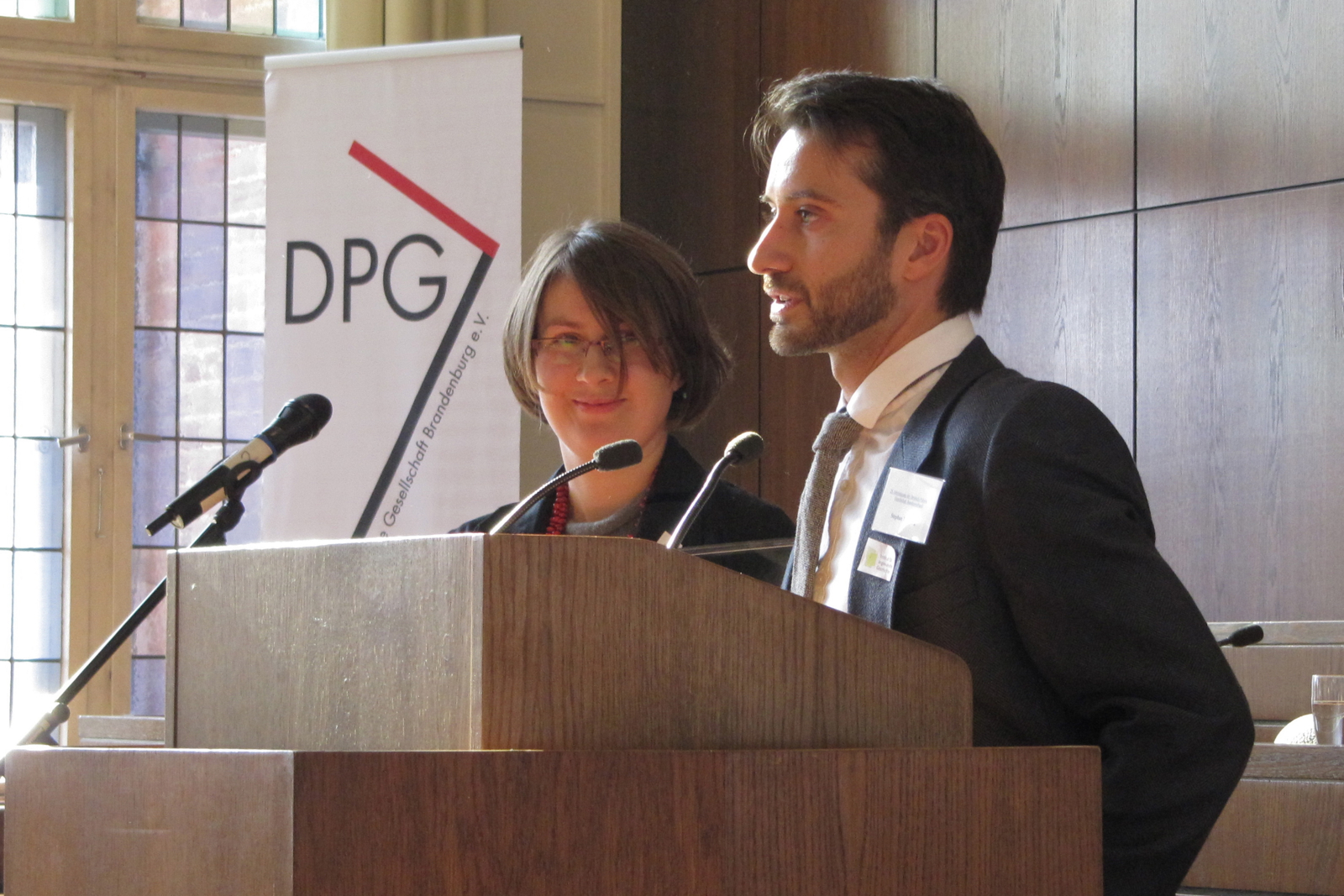
Award ceremony of the DIALOG Prize in 2011, Magdalena Abraham-Diefenbach and Stephan Felsberg

Deutsch-Polnische Gesellschaft Bundesverband (DPG, Polish: Federalny Związek Towarzystw Niemiecko-Polskich) is a society of different regional associations which promote reconciliation and cultural exchange of Germany and Poland. It was founded in 1996, succeeding the Bundesverband deutsch-polnischer Gesellschaften, which was founded in 1987. One of the goals is the integration of Poland in the European Union. The organization is based in Berlin.

The association publishes a quarterly bilingual magazine, Dialog.

== DIALOG Prize ==
Beginning in 2005, the association has awarded an annually a prize, also called DIALOG, to persons and organisations that are "a model for the dialogue of nations and cultures in Europe, and the improvement of German-Polish relations" ("... in vorbildlicher Art und Weise für den Dialog der Völker und Kulturen in Europa sowie die Vertiefung der deutsch-polnischen Beziehungen engagieren").

Recipients include:

- 2005: Tygodnik Powszechny, Kraków weekly
- 2006: Pogranicze Foundation, in Sejny
- 2007: Christliche Bildungsinitiative
- 2008: Steffen Möller, writer and Kabarett artist
- 2009: Ludwig Mehlhorn, Wolfgang Templin
- 2010: Klaus Zernack, historian, and Kowalski trifft Schmidt, TV magazine
- 2011: Institut für angewandte Geschichte, in Frankfurt (Oder)
- 2012: Artur Becker, writer
- 2013: Grażyna Słomka, Adam Krzemiński, publicists
- 2014: Lech Wałęsa and the Interregionaler Gewerkschaftsrat Elbe-Neiße
- 2015: Zofia Posmysz, writer, and Osteuropa, magazine
- 2016: Marek Prawda, diplomat
- 2017: Martin Pollack, journalist and literature translator
- 2018: Henryk Muszyński, Archbishop Emeritus
- 2019: Anna Wolff-Powęska, historian
- 2020: Adam Bodnar, Ombudsman of Poland
- 2021: Robert Traba and Hans Henning Hahn, historians
- 2022: Andrii Portnov, historian
- 2023: Wiesław Smętek, illustrator and graphic artist
- 2024: Leszek Szuster, former director of the International Youth Meetings in Oświęcim/Auschwitz
