= Piano Sonata No. 4 (Weinberg) =

Piano sonata

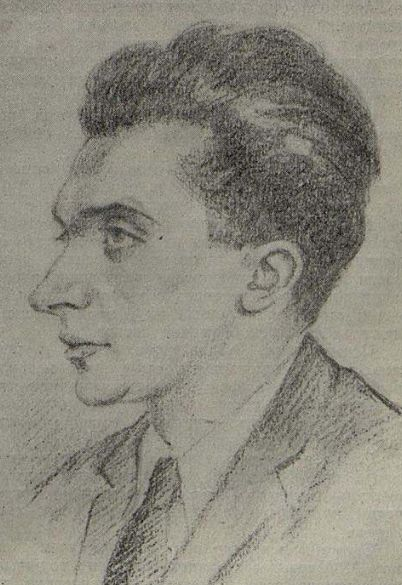
Pencil portrait of Mieczysław Weinberg, January 1949

The Piano Sonata No. 4 in B minor, Op. 56, is a piano sonata in four movements written in 1955 by Polish composer Mieczysław Weinberg. The piece was dedicated to Soviet pianist Emil Gilels.

== Compositional background ==
In January 1953, Weinberg had been arrested by Soviet authorities on charges of "Jewish bourgeois nationalism" as part of the Doctors' plot and sentenced to execution. However, the death of Stalin shortly after caused his release and marked the start of an era of renewed creative freedom for the composer, who remained in Moscow.

== Style ==
Weinberg's later piano sonatas, starting with the fourth, mark a departure from the composer's influences in the genre (notably that of Prokofiev and Shostakovich) and a further affirmation of the composer's personal musical style; the fourth sonata is his first truly idiosyncratic sonata. However, influences of the older Soviet composers persist; Weinberg himself notes that "the Shostakovich school has been fundamental for my artistic work."

According to Naxos, the sonata "fuses folk inspiration, rhythmic vivacity and melancholy in a profoundly personal way." Weinberg biographer David Fanning describes the work as "classically balanced" and holding a deeper "expressive range" than previous works, the technical demands on the pianist rising in a parallel manner.

The piece is notable for its motivic unity, with a common Largo theme in E minor thematically linking all four movements together.

== Structure ==
The piece is structured in four movements:

1. Allegro, in B minor
2. Allegro, in A minor
3. Adagio, in Bb major
4. Allegro, in B minor

To an opening disquiet, busy Allegro in sonata form succeeds a dance-like, dissonant movement in 3/4 time. The following contemplative and deeply nostalgic Adagio provides a moment of rest before the final Allegro, featuring another dance-like main theme progressively gaining in intensity and despair. However, the agitation of the movement trails off towards the end of the movement, giving way to a Largo theme previously heard in other movements of the sonata. The piece ends in somber silence, over a Bm pianissimo chord.

Average performance duration is about 26 minutes.

== Recordings ==
Performer	Date of recording	Name of album	Notes
Emil Gilels	1992	Vainberg, Stravinsky, Scriabin, Prokofiev, Medtner	
Murray McLachlan	1998	Vainberg: Vol.13 (Piano Sonatas)	
Allison Brewster Franzetti	2012	Weinberg: Complete Piano Works - 2	part of a Grand Piano Records anthology of the complete works for solo piano by Weinberg
Anastasia Seifetdinova	2018	Music of Alexander Krein and Mieczysław Weinberg	
Elizaveta Blumina	2018	Mieczyslaw Weinberg: Piano Sonatas, Opp. 8, 49bis & 56	
Anastasia Yasko	2021	20th Century Russian Piano Sonatas	
Yulianna Avdeeva	2023	Resilience	part of a studio album for Pentatone including works by Szpilman, Shostakovich, Weinberg and Prokofiev
