= Zofia Posmysz =

Polish journalist and writer (1923–2022)

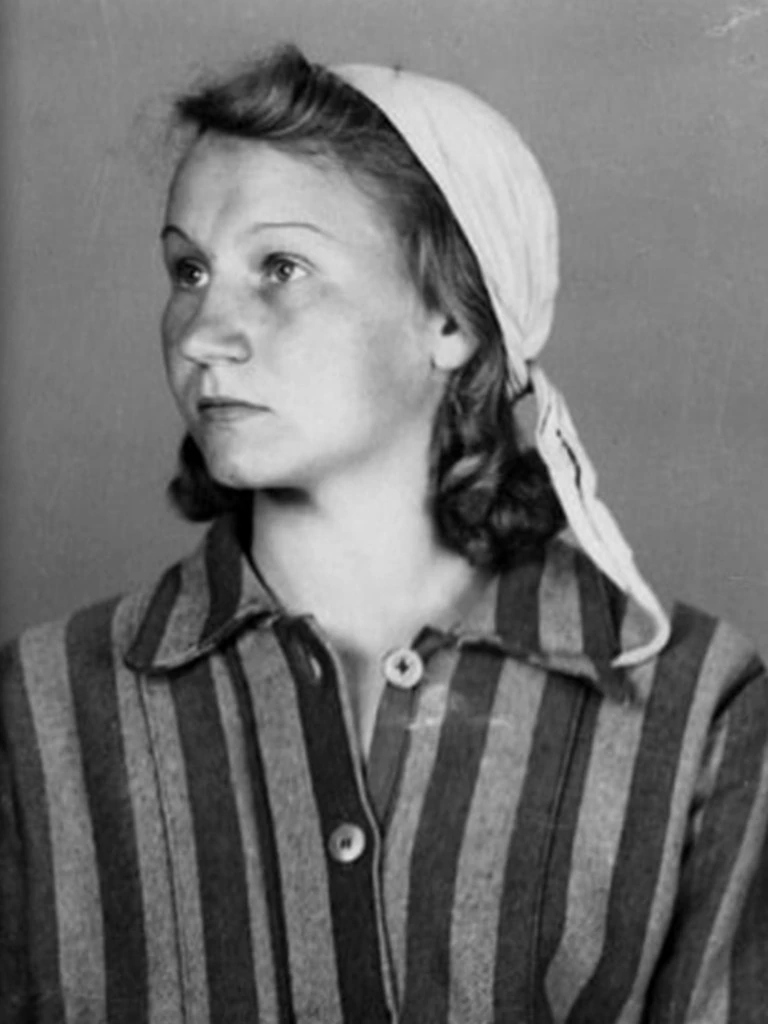
- Zofia Posmysz as inmate No 7566 at the Auschwitz concentration camp, 1942. Credited to Wilhelm Brasse
- Born: 23 August 1923; Kraków, Second Polish Republic
- Died: 8 August 2022 (aged 98); Oświęcim, Poland
- Education: University of Warsaw
- Employer: Polskie Radio
- Known for: Passenger
- Awards: Order of Polonia Restituta; Order of Merit of the Federal Republic of Germany

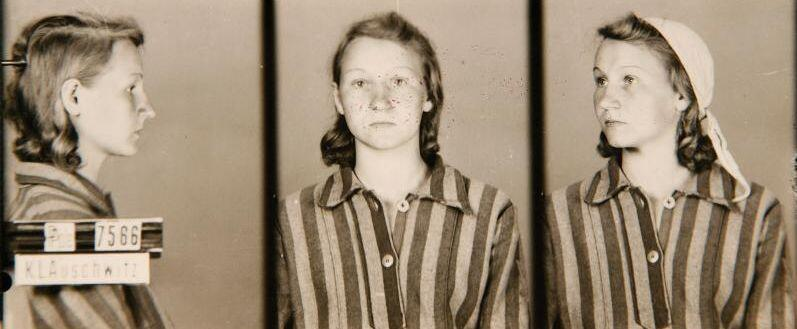
Zofia Posmysz in KL Auschwitz. SS administration mug shot

Zofia Posmysz-Piasecka (née Posmysz; 23 August 1923 – 8 August 2022) was a Polish journalist, novelist, and author. She was a resistance fighter in World War II and survived imprisonment at the Auschwitz and Ravensbrück concentration camps. Her autobiographical account of the Holocaust in occupied Poland, Passenger from Cabin 45, became the basis for her 1962 novel Passenger, subsequently translated into 15 languages. The original radio drama was adapted for an award-winning feature film, while the novel was adapted into an opera of the same name with music by Mieczysław Weinberg.

== Early life ==
Posmysz was born in Kraków and lived there until the invasion of Poland in 1939. During the occupation she attended clandestine courses and worked at a cable factory. She was arrested by the Gestapo in 1942, at age 18, charged with distributing anti-Nazi leaflets. She was kept for six weeks at the Montelupich Prison in Kraków. After prolonged interrogation she was moved under escort to the Auschwitz-Birkenau concentration camp. Relegated to arduous work at a penal company in Budy, she was saved twice by the camp doctor, Janusz Mąkowski. On 18 January 1945, Posmysz (prisoner number 7566) was sent to Ravensbrück concentration camp and from there to the Neustadt-Glewe satellite camp, where she was liberated on 2 May 1945 by the US Army.

== Postwar life ==
After World War II, she studied at the University of Warsaw, and worked for the broadcaster Polskie Radio in the culture section. In 1959, she wrote a radio drama, Pasażerka z kabiny 45 (Passenger from Cabin 45), based on her memories from the time spent in Nazi concentration camps. The play was produced in the same year by the Polish Radio featuring Aleksandra Śląska and Jan Świderski. It was adapted for television by Posmysz in 1960. The show was directed by Andrzej Munk and featured Ryszarda Hanin, Zofia Mrozowska, and Edward Dziewoński in the leading roles. The Passenger from Cabin 45 was innovative and unusual in the genre of Holocaust literature, because it depicted a loyal SS Aufseherin, Annelise Franz, in charge of Posmysz's work detail at Auschwitz, who nevertheless exhibited basic human behaviour towards prisoners.

The screenplay for the film was written by both Posmysz and Munk in 1961. Munk died in a car crash soon thereafter. Posmysz did not participate in the making of the film, which was released in 1963. Instead, she focused on writing a novel derived from her autobiographical memory. The book was published in 1962 as Pasażerka. The events in the book take place on an ocean liner, 16 years after the war ended. The former SS Aufseherin, Lisa Kretschmer, travels with her husband in search of a new life. Among the many passengers, she spots Marta, her former inmate, whom she used to feed and protect from dangerous labour. While at Auschwitz, Lisa was assigned to a new post of duty, and offered Marta to take her from the camp to detention in a less dangerous place, but to no avail. In the end of the novel, she learns that Marta recognized her also. Notably, in the original radio drama, the titular 'Cabin 45' was Posmysz's compartment number on a train to Auschwitz; an ocean-travel served as literary device of story within a story. No English translation of The Passenger novel exists.

When Pope Benedict XVI visited the memorial for Auschwitz in 2006, she was among the surviving inmates greeting him. In 2015, Posmysz was among 19 Auschwitz survivors reporting for a documentary by Der Spiegel titled The Last Witnesses (Die letzten Zeugen).

Posmysz died in Oświęcim on 8 August 2022, at the age of 98.

=== Work and legacy ===
Posmysz went on writing continuously for over 30 years and wrote her last published book at the age of 73. She is best known for her 1959 autobiography Passenger in Cabin 45 (Pasażerka z kabiny 45) which led to a television play and film The Passenger by Andrzej Munk, who was one of the most influential artists of the post-Stalinist Poland. The director died during the screening in 1961, but the film was completed by his assistants, directors Andrzej Brzozowski and Witold Lesiewicz, and first released in 1963. The novel by Posmysz became the basis of the libretto by Alexander Medvedev for Mieczysław Weinberg's 1968 opera The Passenger, Op. 97. Suppressed for more than 40 years, it was first staged at Bregenz Festival on 21 July 2010, followed by the same production at the Grand Theatre in Warsaw. The opera by Weinberg premièred at the Lyric Opera of Chicago on 24 February 2015, with soprano Amanda Majeski as Marta. Die Passagierin was staged by the Frankfurt Opera in March 2015 with Leo Hussain conducting.

The novel Pasażerka was translated into 15 languages, including German as Die Passagierin by Peter Ball, published in 1969 by Verlag Neues Leben and as Book on demand (third ed.) in 2010.

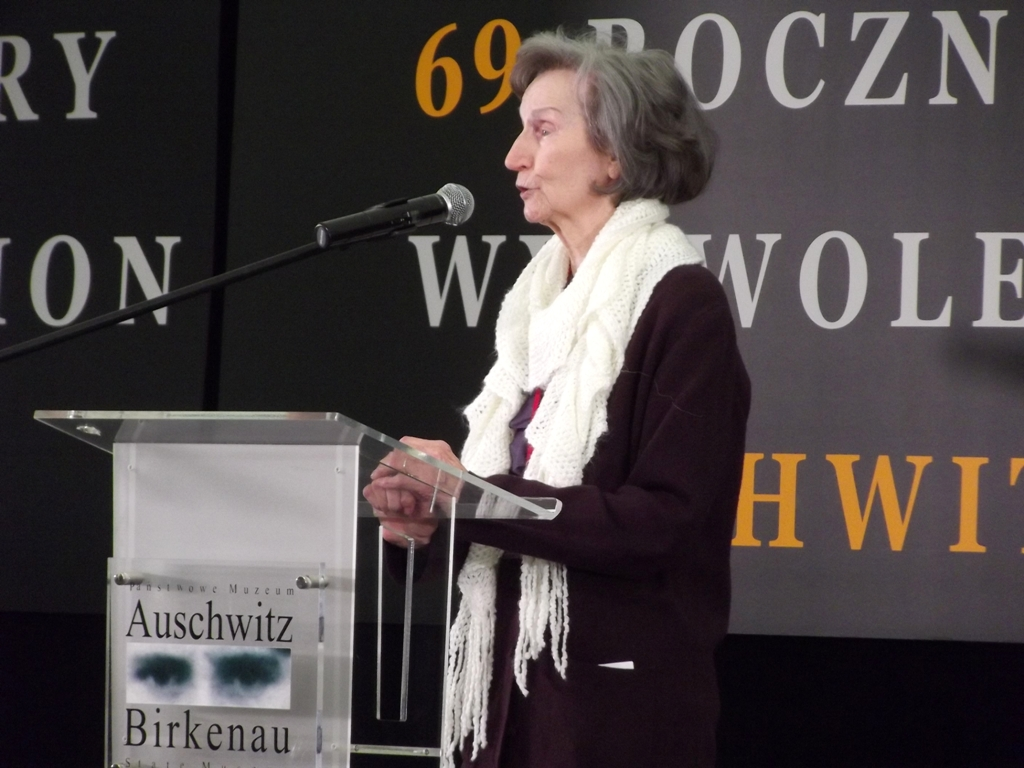
Zofia Posmysz speaking at the Auschwitz-Birkenau Memorial and Museum Conference on the anniversary of the camp's liberation, 27 January 2014

== Works ==
A selection of works by Posmysz, published in Polish, includes:

- I know the executioners from Belsen... (Znam katów z Belsen…; 1945)
- Passenger from cabin 45 (Pasażerka z kabiny 45; 1959)
- Passenger (Pasażerka, novel, 1962)
- A stop in the forest (Przystanek w lesie; stories, 1965)
- The sick hawthorn (Cierpkie głogi; screenplay, 1966)
- Little (Mały; screenplay, 1970)
- Holiday on the Adriatic (Wakacje nad Adriatykiem; 1970)
- Microclimate (Mikroklimat; 1975)
- A Tree Similar to Another Tree (Drzewo do drzewa podobne; 1977)
- Price (Cena; 1978)
- The Same Doctor M (Ten sam doktor M; 1981)
- Widows and lovers (Wdowa i kochankowie; 1988)
- To freedom, to death, to life (Do wolności, do śmierci, do życia; 1996)

== Awards ==
- 1964: Knight of the Order of Polonia Restituta
- 1970: Officer of the Order of Polonia Restituta
- 1976: Prize of the Polish Radio and Television Committee for Outstanding Achievements in the Field of Radio Drama
- 2007: Witold Hulewicz Prize
- 2008: Prize of Poland's Minister of Culture for Outstanding Achievements in the Cultural Heritage Field
- 2012: Order of Merit of the Federal Republic of Germany
- 2015: DIALOG Prize of the Deutsch-Polnische Gesellschaft Bundesverband
- 2020: Order of the White Eagle (Poland)
