= Passenger (1963 film) =

- Czech poster promoting the film
- Directed by: Andrzej Munk; Witold Lesiewicz
- Written by: Andrzej Munk; Zofia Posmysz-Piasecka
- Starring: Aleksandra Śląska
- Cinematography: Krzysztof Winiewicz
- Edited by: Zofia Dwornik
- Music by: Tadeusz Baird
- Release date: 1963
- Running time: 62 minutes
- Country: Poland
- Language: Polish

Passenger (Polish: Pasażerka) is a 1963 Polish feature film directed by Andrzej Munk. When Munk died in a car crash during production, the unfinished film was assembled for release by directors Witold Lesiewicz and Andrzej Brzozowski.

Passenger, using the form of a documentary, dramatizes the memories of a fictional SS officer (played by Aleksandra Śląska) who had served at the Auschwitz concentration camp during World War II. The Passenger examines the nature of oppressor and victim within the microcosm of a German extermination camp during the Jewish Holocaust.

== Plot ==
The Passenger begins in 1960, fifteen years after the end of World War II. The setting is a transatlantic voyage aboard a luxury liner en route from South America to Europe.

Liza Kretschmer (Alexandra Śląska), a former concentration camp SS officer, has a chance encounter with a fellow passenger who was one of her inmates at the camp, Marta (Anna Ciepielewska). Aboard the vessel, the roles of Liza and Marta are more or less reversed. Marta is in a position to expose the former Nazi as a war criminal, and if not to the authorities, at least to Liza's husband, who is ignorant of her past. The meeting unleashes a cascade of memories for Liza, in which she struggles to revisit the events at the extermination center, and the nature of her behavior towards Marta. In a series of flashbacks, Liza's internal narrative, which serves to rationalize her role, clashes with memories of the systematic murder of men, woman and children that characterized the Holocaust. The complexities of the relationship between perpetrator and victim reveals the degradation of Marta, who survived by accommodating herself to her oppressors.

== Production history ==
“Andrzej Munk’s films were enormously appealing because they dealt with some of the most important experiences of wartime and postwar society..His treatment of the Holocaust was one of the most serious and multi-dimensional in the history of cinema.” - Dorota Niemitz in World Socialist Web Site (2014)

Munk, at the age of 39, died in a car accident while the film was in production. The completed scenes were combined from parts of original footage and screenplay sketches by Witold Lesiewicz. The methods used are explained in a voice-over during the course of the film, so its unfinished state itself takes a documentary form. Parts of the film were shot at Auschwitz. The source for The Passenger was a radio drama titled Passenger from Cabin Number 45, written by Zofia Posmysz-Piasecka in 1959.

Posmysz's play was later reworked into a novel. It was published in 1962 as Pasażerka.

When the work was made into an opera in 1968, American audiences were first alerted to Munk's impressive cinematic oeuvre.

From the novel, "The Passenger" was adapted into an opera The Passenger by Polish-Jewish-Soviet Composer Mieczysław Weinberg in 1967/68, in collaboration with Posmysz. The success of the opera since its staged premiere in 2010 has prompted a renewed interest in Munk's film.

== Cast ==
- Aleksandra Śląska - Liza Kretschmer, former SS Aufseherin at Auschwitz
- Anna Ciepielewska - Marta, the Polish inmate
- Janusz Bylczynski - Capo
- Krystyna Dubielowna
- Anna Golebiowska - Auschwitz Prisoner
- Barbara Horawianka - Nurse
- Anna Jaraczówna - Capo
- Maria Koscialkowska - Guard, Inga Weniger
- Andrzej Krasicki - Commission Member
- Jan Kreczmar - Walter Kretschmer, Lisa's husband
- Irena Malkiewicz - Oberaufseherin Madel
- Izabella Olszewska
- Leon Pietraszkiewicz - Lagerkommandant Grabner
- Kazimierz Rudzki - Commission Member
- Wanda Swaryczewska

== Awards ==
The film Passenger was entered into the 1964 Cannes Film Festival where it won a FIPRESCI Award. The film was also selected as the Polish entry for the Best Foreign Language Film at the 37th Academy Awards.

== See also ==
- List of submissions to the 37th Academy Awards for Best Foreign Language Film
- List of Polish submissions for the Academy Award for Best Foreign Language Film

== Sources ==
- Niemitz, Dorota. 2014. The legacy of postwar Polish filmmaker Andrzej Munk. World Socialist Web Site. 13 October 2014. Retrieved 8 July 2022.
