= Vasily Zolotarev =

Russian (Soviet) composer and music teacher

Vasily Andreyevich Zolotarev, also romanized as Zolotaryov (Russian: Василий Андреевич Золотарёв; February 24, 1872 in Taganrog – May 25, 1964 in Moscow), was a Russian (Soviet) composer and music teacher of Greek ancestry.

== Biography ==
Vasily Zolotarev was born to a Greek family named Kuyumzhi (Куюмжи) or Kouyoumtzis in the city of Taganrog in 1872. The family name was later changed to the more Russian Zolotarev. He studied music at the Saint Petersburg Conservatory under direction of Mily Balakirev (1893–1898) in the class of Nikolai Rimsky-Korsakov (1898–1900), graduating in 1900. Zolotarev lectured at Moscow Conservatory (1909–1918), at the Belarus State Academy of Music (Белорусская государственная консерватория им. А. В. Луначарского) in 1933–1941, and other conservatories. Among his students in Minsk was Mieczysław Weinberg.

Zolotaryov was a prolific composer and left behind a large body of works: three operas, ballets, seven symphonies (1902-1962), three concerti, cantatas, romances, six string quartets, and other works. Among his stage works are: The Decembrists, revised as Kondraty Ryleyev, libretto by Yasinovsky,1957 (presented in a concert performance on 29.08.1857, Moscow), Khvestko Andyber, 1928 (written during his teaching in Ukraine, presented in a concert performance in Kiev, 1928 and printed by Kharkov State Publishing House, 1929). He also wrote the operetta Rikiki (1917), the opera Ak-Gulon on Uzbek Themes (1932–34) and the ballet Knyaz’-ozero (‘Prince-lake’) (1949). Zolotaryov's personal archive is kept at the Belarusian State Archives-Museum of Literature and Art in Minsk. His 7 symphonies, the suite from the ballet Prince-lake and fragments from the opera Decembrists were recorded by the Belarusian State Symphony Orchestra (1971–1973). Melodiya Records Company produced three LPs in 1974, dedicated to the 100-year-jubilee of composer's birth. There is also a recording of his 6th Symphony My Homeland (1954) and some of his ballet music in the archives of Belarus TV–Radio Company.

== Rhapsodie hébraïque ==
The New York Times wrote of Zolotarev's Rhapsodie hébraïque that it was "based on Hebrew melodies now used in Russia... among the Jewish families of the lower classes. ... [Zolotarev] found that upon a Hebrew racial idiom there had been grafted some of the characteristic of Russian music just as the irreducible language of the Jews in any country is overlaid by a few words or modes of expression belonging to the land of their environment. Thus the melodies... are the musical equivalent of Yiddish." They described the melodies as "built upon an Oriental scale... [whose] earmark is an augmented interval instead of that found in the diatonic scale between the third and fourth notes.

== Selected works ==
Stage

- Decembrists (Декабристы), Opera (1925); new edition Kondrati Ryleev, 1957
- Prince Lake (Князь-озеро), Ballet (1949); won the Stalin Prize in 1950

Orchestral

- Symphonies
  - Symphony No. 1, Op. 8 (1902)
  - Symphony No. 2, The Year 1905 (1929)
  - Symphony No. 3, The SS Chelyuskin (1935)
  - Symphony No. 4, Belorussian (1936)
  - Symphony No. 5, The Year 1941 (1942)
  - Symphony No. 6, My Motherland (1954)
  - Symphony No. 7 (1962)
- Fête villageoise (Деревенский праздник; Village Festival), Overture in F major, Op. 4 (1901)
- Rhapsodie hébraïque (Еврейская рапсодия), Op. 7 (1903)
- Ouverture-fantaisie, Op. 22 (1907)

Concertante

- Concerto for cello and orchestra (1963)

Chamber music

- Suite in the Form of Variations (Сюита в форме вариаций) for violin and piano, Op. 2 (1900)
- String Quartet No. 1, Op. 5 (1901)
- String Quartet No. 2 in A minor, Op. 6 (1902)
- 2 Novelettes for violin and piano, Op. 11 (1904)
- Piano Quartet in D minor, Op. 13 (1905)
- String Quintet in F minor for 2 violins, viola and 2 cellos, Op. 19 (1905)
- String Quartet No. 3 in D major, Op. 25 (1908)
- Trio for violin, viola and piano, Op. 28 (1910)
- String Quartet No. 4 in B♭ major, Op. 33 (1913)
- Eclogue (Эклога) in A minor for viola and piano, Op. 38 (1921)
- Sonata for violin and piano, Op. 40 (1925)
- String Quartet No. 5 in G major, Op. 46 (1930)
- Capriccio on a Hebrew Melody (Каприччио на еврейскую мелодию) for violin and piano (1938)
- Trio for violin, cello and piano (1953)
- String Quartet No. 6 "on Russian Folk Themes" (на русские народные темы) (1959)
- Poème (Поэма) for cello and piano (1962)

Piano

- Sonata [No. 1], Op. 10 (1904)
- Trois Préludes (Три прелюдии) Op. 18 (1905)
- Ukrainian Songs (Украинские песни), 30 Short Pieces for piano 4-hands, Op. 15 (1925)
- Sonata No. 2, Op. 42 (1927)
- 4 Pieces (Четыре пьесы), Op. 43 (1929)
- Trois récits (Три рассказа), Op. 44 (1926)

Choral

- Paradise and the Peri (Рай и Пери), Cantata (1900); awarded the Rubinstein Prize

Vocal

- 4 Songs (Четыре романса) for high voice and piano, Op. 1 (1900)
- 4 Songs (Четыре романса) for voice and piano, Op. 16 (1904)
- 6 Songs (Шесть романсов) for low voice and piano, Op. 17 (1905)

Literary

- Fugue: A Guide to the Practical Study (Фуга: руководство к практическому изучению), Moscow 1956
- Memories of My Great Teachers, Friends and Comrades (Воспоминания о моих великих учителях, друзьях и товарищах), Moscow 1957

== Awards ==
- 1932 – Honored Artist of the RSFSR
- 1940 – Order of the Red Banner of Labour
- 1949 – People's Artist of the BSSR
- 1950 – Stalin Prize
- 1955 – Order of Lenin
