= The Love of d'Artagnan =

Opera by Mieczysław Weinberg

- comic opera by Mieczysław Weinberg
- Native title: Russian: Любовь Д’Артаньяна
- Librettist: Nora Gal
- Language: Russian
- Based on: Three Musketeers by Alexandre Dumas

The Love of d'Artagnan (Russian: «Любовь Д’Артаньяна», Lyobov D'Artanyana) is a 1971 comic opera by Mieczysław Weinberg set to a Russian libretto by Nora Gal, after The Three Musketeers of Dumas. It was the third of Weinberg's first three operas, all of which were praised by his friend and protector Shostakovich.
