= Passenger (company) =

British outdoor apparel company

Passenger logo

Passenger is a British outdoor clothing brand. Based in the New Forest, UK, it was founded by Richard and Alexa Sutcliffe in 2012.. Passenger's initial product range, developed in 2013, consisted of beanie hats and t-shirts The company began its international expansion in 2023, starting with the US and Germany. That year, the Sutcliffes sold minority stakes for £15 million to the investment firm Growth Partner, backed by HomeServe founder Richard Harpin, and the former Gymshark chief executive Steve Hewitt, who is currently Passenger’s chairman. Also that year, the retailer was named ninth out of The Sunday Times 100’s annual ranking of Britain’s fastest-growing private companies with revenues of less than £250 million. In 2025, Passenger paused its US expansion due to tariff announcements affecting UK businesses Passenger has been featured on The Sunday Times 100 list of fastest-growing private British companies and in 2024 was named the second-fastest growing fashion retail business in Britain. Passenger is rated "Good" in the Good On You ethical brand directory.
