= The Passenger (short story) =

"The Passenger" is a short story by Russian American author Vladimir Nabokov originally published in Russian in 1927.

== Summary ==
A writer and critic have a conversation on a train. The story uses third-person narration and opens with a writer explaining his view that Life creates much better situations than a writer ever could, and that it's a writer's job to plagiarize from actual experience, all the while cleaning up the frayed edges of "Life's untidy genius", like a producer does to a novel when making a film. The writer then recounts a true story about a passenger he heard sobbing aboard a train. After the police announced that a murderer who killed his wife and her lover was suspected to be on board the train, they checked passports and found that the weeping passenger was not the murderer.

The writer and critic then discuss whether this is a good twist. The writer asks the critic to be honest and to confess that he expected the crying passenger to turn out to be the murderer. The critic tells the writer that it is the artist's job to make a story out of this apparently random experience, by providing an explanation for the weeping. The critic, after warning the writer not to overuse his method of trying to "produce an impression of expectancy by means of the most natural denouement" reminds him that "The Word is given the sublime right to enhance chance and to make of the transcendental something that is not accidental". After this, he suggests his own explanation, showcasing his complete artistic and imaginative inability: the loss of the passenger's wallet. In the end, a waitress comes to pour them more drinks (suggesting that this was just a drunken conversation between passengers).
