= Wolf Gorelik =

Russian conductor

Wolf Gorelik Вольф Михайлович Горелик
- Birth name: Wolf Mikhailovich Gorelik
- Born: 1933; Pervouralsk, Sverdlovsk Oblast, Soviet Union
- Died: March 10, 2013 (aged 79–80)
- Occupation: Conductor
- Years active: 1963–2013

Wolf Gorelik (Russian: Вольф Михайлович Горелик; 1933–2013) was a Russian conductor, specialising in theatre work.

Born in Pervouralsk, Sverdlovsk Oblast, Gorelik studied at the Urals Mussorgsky State Conservatoire, where he studied conducting with Mikhail Paverman and violin with Mikhail Zatulovski. From 1963 to 1964, he was a conductor of the Tomsk Philharmonic Society's Symphony Orchestra. From 1965 to 1966 he was a conductor of the Sverdlovsk Opera. He became chief conductor of the Buryat Opera in 1966. He was chief conductor at the Saratov Opera and Chernyshevsky Ballet from 1967 to 1973. In 1974, he joined the Moscow Operetta as chief conductor and held the post for two decades. In 1993, he became principal conductor at the Stanislavski and Nemirovich-Danchenko Moscow Academic Music Theatre.

From 1980 to 1993, Gorelik was a music director of the Russian Academy of Theatre Arts' Opera Studio, and starting in 1990, held the same position at the East Ukrainian New Symphony Orchestra with which he also recorded works of Britten, Rachmaninoff and Arnold Schoenberg.

Gorelik died in Moscow on March 10, 2013, from pneumonia, after conducting a performance of Gaetano Donizetti's L'elisir d'amore.
