= Nora Gal =

Soviet translator, literary critic, and translation theorist

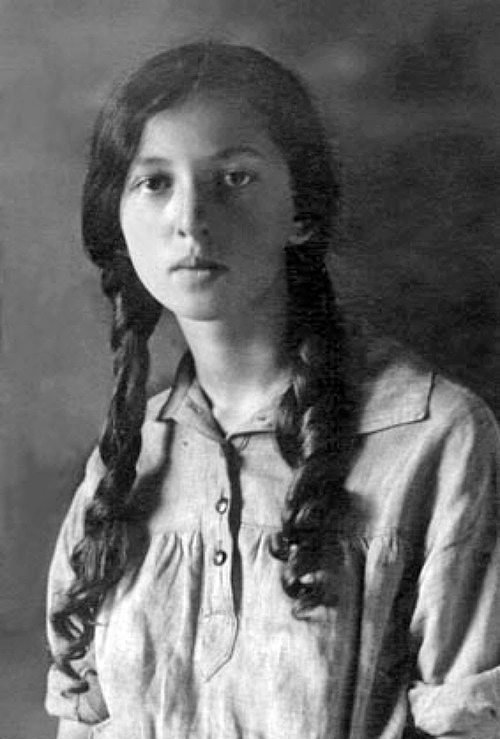
Nora Gal (1927)

Nora Gal (Russian: Нора Галь), full name Eleonora Yakovlevna Galperina (Russian: Элеонора Яковлевна Гальперина, April 27, 1912, in Odessa – July 23, 1991) was a Soviet translator, literary critic, and translation theorist.

== Biography ==
She was born on April 27, 1912, in Odessa. Her father was a medical doctor and her mother a lawyer. As a child, she moved to Moscow with her family. After several unsuccessful attempts she was admitted to the Lenin Pedagogical Institute, from which she graduated. She then completed her post-graduate studies with a thesis on the French poet Arthur Rimbaud and published articles on classical and contemporary foreign literature (Guy de Maupassant, Byron, Alfred de Musset). She married literary critic Boris Kuzmin and later became editor of his selected works.

When she was still a schoolgirl she published some poems, while during her student years she switched to prose. Towards the end of the 1930s, she wrote many articles on contemporary foreign literature. She started her active career as a translator during World War II, and after the war she devoted herself to translating authors such as Jules Renard, Alexandre Dumas père and H. G. Wells.

In the 1950s, she translated "Le Petit Prince" by Antoine de Saint-Exupéry, novels by J.D. Salinger, and "To Kill a Mockingbird" by Harper Lee into Russian. She became a widely respected and prominent translator. In the last period of her activity she tackled such masterpieces as "The Stranger" by Albert Camus and "Death of a Hero" by Richard Aldington, as well as books by Thomas Wolfe, Katherine Anne Porter, and by a number of science fiction authors, including Isaac Asimov and Arthur C. Clarke, Roger Zelazny and Ursula K. Le Guin.

In 1972, she wrote Words Living and Words Dead (Слово живое и мёртвое), a manual on voice that contains numerous examples of translation, both good and bad. There, she challenged conventions and advocated lively word choice and sentence structure over passive, cluttered, and official tone, simplicity and flow over the accepted heavy, cold, and technical style; if it makes more sense but sounds rustic, then so be it. It was subsequently revised and had been reprinted four times by 1987. It has recently been reprinted twice in 2001 and 2004.

== Legacy ==
In July 1995, the International Astronomical Union chose to honour her naming one of the asteroids in the Asteroid belt Noragal.

Since 2012, The Nora Gal Prize for the best translation of short story from English into Russian is awarded yearly.)
