= The Passenger (opera) =

Opera by Mieczysław Weinberg

- Opera by Mieczysław Weinberg
- Native title: Пассажирка (Passazhirka)
- Librettist: Alexander Medvedev
- Language: Russian; German; Polish; English, among others
- Based on: Pasażerka z kabiny 45 by Zofia Posmysz
- Premiere: 25 December 2006; Semi-staged in the Svetlanov Hall of the Moscow International House of Music with musicians of the Stanislavsky Theatre; 2010: staged at Bregenz Festival

The Passenger (Russian: Пассажирка, romanized: Passazhirka) is a 1968 opera by Mieczysław Weinberg to a Russian libretto by Alexander Medvedev. Medvedev's libretto is based on the 1959 Polish radio play Pasażerka z kabiny 45 (Passenger from Cabin Number 45) by concentration-camp survivor Zofia Posmysz. The opera, scheduled for the Bolshoi Theatre in 1968, was not premiered until 2006, when musicians of the Stanislavsky Theatre presented a semi-staging conducted by Wolf Gorelik in the Svetlanov Hall of the Moscow International House of Music on 25 December. Medvedev's libretto was reworked in 2010 for the first staged performance of the opera at the Bregenzer Festspiele into German, English, Polish, Yiddish, French, Russian and Czech. It has then been performed internationally.

== History ==
Mieczysław Weinberg composed The Passenger in 1968 to a Russian libretto by Alexander Medvedev.(Russian: Пассажирка, romanized: Passazhirka) Medvedev's libretto is based on the 1959 Polish radio play Pasażerka z kabiny 45 (Passenger from Cabin Number 45) by concentration-camp survivor Zofia Posmysz. The play was rewritten in 1962 by its author as a novel, Pasażerka. Posmysz also worked with Andrzej Munk on the screenplay for his related, posthumously finished 1963 film Pasażerka. Medvedev's libretto was reworked in 2010 for the first staged performance of the opera at the Bregenzer Festspiele into German, English, Polish, Yiddish, French, Russian and Czech.

== Performance history ==
Originally scheduled to be performed at the Bolshoi in 1968, the opera was not premiered until 25 December 2006, when it received a semi-staging by musicians of the Stanislavsky Theater in Moscow. It was premiered by musicians of the Stanislavsky Theatre in the Svetlanov Hall of the Moscow International House of Music on 25 December 2006, in a semi-staging conducted by Wolf Gorelik. The cast included Anastasia Bakastova as Katya, Natalia Muradimova as Marta, Natalia Vladimirskaya as Liza, Alexey Dolgov as Valter and Dmitry Kondratkov as Tadeush.

The first full staging took place in 2010 at the Bregenzer Festspiele, directed by David Pountney, with a set design by Johan Engels. Teodor Currentzis conducted the Wiener Symphoniker and the Prague Philharmonic Choir. The July 31 performance was filmed and released on DVD and Blu-ray. The same production was presented in Warsaw by Polish National Opera in 2010 and received its UK première on 19 September 2011 at the English National Opera (broadcast live on BBC Radio 3 on 15 October). In 2013, it was performed in Germany for the first time at Badisches Staatstheater in Karlsruhe. The Passenger received its American premiere on 18 January 2014, at Houston Grand Opera. The opera has also been produced at the Lyric Opera of Chicago and at the Oper Frankfurt (Germany), both in early 2015. It was produced by Florida Grand Opera in 2016, by The Israeli Opera in 2019, in 2020 by Madrid's Teatro Real, and then again in 2024 at the Bavarian State Opera.

== Roles ==
| Role | Voice type | Character nationality |
|---|---|---|
| Katya (Катя) | soprano | Russian |
| Marta (Марта) | soprano | Polish |
| Liza (Лиза) | mezzo-soprano | German |
| Valter (Вальтер/Walter) | tenor | German |
| Tadeush (Тадеуш/Tadeusz) | baritone | Polish |
Smaller roles:
| Krystina | mezzo-soprano | Polish |
| Vlasta | mezzo-soprano | Czech |
| Hannah | contralto | Greek (identified in the piano/vocal score as a "Jewess") |
| Yvette | soprano | French |
| Alte | soprano | German |
| Bronka | contralto | Polish |
| First SS-Man | bass | German |
| Second SS-Man | bass | German |
| Third SS-Man | tenor | German |
| Another Passenger | bass | |
| Female Supervisor | spoken | German |
| Kapo | spoken | German |
| Steward | spoken | |
Prisoners in Auschwitz, passengers and crew of the ship

== Instrumentation ==
Orchestra:

- 3 flutes (the third flute doubles a piccolo)
- 3 oboes (the third oboe doubles an English horn)
- 3 Clarinets (The second doubles a piccolo clarinet, the third doubles a bass clarinet)
- Alto saxophone
- 3 bassoons (The third bassoon doubles a contrabassoon)
- 6 horns, baritone horn
- 4 trumpets
- 3 trombones
- tuba
- Timpani, triangle, tambourine, small side drum, military drum, tenor drum, whip, cymbals, bass drum, tam-tam, marimba, vibraphone, xylophone, tubular bells, glockenspiel
- Celesta
- Piano
- Harp
- Guitar
- String section

Banda:

- Accordion
- Guitar
- Piano
- Jazz percussion
- Solo double bass

== Synopsis ==
The opera is set on two levels: the upper level depicts the deck of an ocean liner after the Second World War where a German couple, Lisa and Walter (a West German diplomat on his way with his new wife to a new diplomatic posting), are sailing to Brazil. The wife, Lisa, thinks she recognises a Polish woman on board, Marta, as a former inmate of Auschwitz concentration camp where she, unknown to her husband, was a camp guard. The second lower level develops below the liner deck, depicting the concentration camp. The opera is an interplay between the two levels.

=== Act 1 ===
Scene 1 : Walter and his wife Lisa are on their way to a new life in Brazil where Walter will take up a diplomatic post. During the journey, Lisa is struck by the appearance of a passenger she sees indistinctly. The passenger reminds her of an inmate in Auschwitz who was under her orders and who she knows for certain is dead. In shock, she reveals her hitherto undisclosed wartime past to her husband.

Scene 2 : In the concentration camp, Lisa and her superior overseer discuss the need to manipulate prisoners and find one amongst each group who can be manipulated to lead the others easily. The male officers drink and sing about how there is nothing to do but how they are less likely to die than fighting on the front against the Russians.

Scene 3 : The women of the camp are introduced and each tells of their background and origins. A Russian woman is brought in having been beaten and tortured and the Kapo in charge discovers a note which may cost her her life. Marta is selected by Lisa to translate it, but deliberately makes it out to be a love letter from her partner Tadeusz, with whom she had been deported to the camp, but who she has not seen these past two years. Lisa believes the subterfuge. As the scene closes Lisa and Walter are seen on the boat in the present time trying to come to terms with Lisa's uncovered past.

=== Act 2 ===
Scene 1 : Belongings of murdered prisoners are being sorted by the women when an officer arrives to demand a violin so that the Kommandant may have his favourite waltz rendered to him by a prisoner. The prisoner Tadeusz is sent to collect the violin and arrives to discover his fiancée Marta there. Their reunion is overseen by Lisa who decides to try and manipulate their relationship so that she may more easily control Marta for her own purposes so as to extend control over all the women prisoners.

Scene 2: Tadeusz is in his prison workshop fashioning jewellery for the officers' private demands. In a pile of his sketches, Lisa recognises the face of Marta. Lisa tries to get Tadeusz to do her bidding also, but seeing that this would leave him indebted to Lisa, he declines, although this will now cost him his life.

Scene 3 : It is Marta's birthday and she sings a lengthy aria to Death itself. Lisa tells Marta that Tadeusz refused her offer and that it will cost him dear, but Marta understands Tadeusz's stance. The women prisoners sing about what they will do when they return home after the war, although it is clear that this will not happen. There is a death-house selection, and the women are all led away as their numbers are called. Marta resignedly follows although she has not been selected for death. Lisa stops her from joining the others and taunts her that her time will come shortly so there is no need to hurry.Lisa's final taunt is that she will live to see Tadeusz's final concert before he is too sent to the death-house as a result of her report.

Scene 4 : In the present time on the boat, Walter and Lisa are still unsure as to whether the mystery woman whose appearance has so upset Lisa is really Marta. The porter Lisa bribed earlier to discover the woman's identity only revealed that she was British. He now returns to add that although she is travelling on a British passport, she is not English and is on deck reading a Polish book. Walter offers to confront the mystery woman to set Lisa's mind at rest before they both decide they are letting their minds run away with themselves. They both resolve to join the dancing in the salon. Lisa dances whilst her husband talks to another passenger. The mystery woman is seen passing a play-request to the band leader. The band then play the same tune that was once the camp Kommandant's favourite waltz. This musical coincidence and the still unknown identity of the passenger further convinces Lisa that Marta is somehow alive and on the boat. Lisa is reduced to terror and shrinks from sight of the mystery passenger retreating from her down the stairs of the liner into the horrors of Tadeusz's final moments.

Scene 5 : Tadeusz is dragged before the Kommandant to provide him with his favourite waltz music. Instead he plays the Chaconne from Bach's Partita for Violin No. 2, making a defiant purely musical protest. Thus he deprives Lisa of her plan to have him executed via her report and deprives the Kommandant of his illusion that he can force people to play him his favourite music under pain of death. Tadeusz seals his own fate and, his violin being smashed, he is dragged off to his death. All the while, Lisa observes the scene whilst still in her ballgown.

Epilogue : The stage becomes completely empty apart from Lisa still in her ballgown who slumps down sitting to the rear silently. Marta enters. She is observed to be wearing non-prisoncamp clothing and with her hair unshaven. She sings that the dead should never be forgotten and they can never forgive. Lisa can only observe, unable to have Marta change her attitude and provide her the closure she craves. The scene fades away musically as does the light and the opera ends very quietly in total darkness.

At no point in the opera is the mystery woman on the boat confirmed as Marta nor does Lisa or anyone ever interact with her on the boat. Lisa's certainty that Marta died in the camp is never contradicted. The final scene, which is designed to be ambiguous, gives no indication as to whether or not Marta survives.

== Recordings ==
- Weinberg: The Passenger Wiener Symphoniker; Prague Philharmonic Choir, Teodor Currentzis ARTHAUS: BLU RAY
- The Passenger, The Ekaterinburg State Academic Opera and Ballet Theatre, Oliver von Dohnányi DVD
- Mieczysław Weinberg: Die Passagierin. Graz Philharmonic Orchestra, Graz Opera Chorus, Roland Kluttig. 2021, Capriccio, CD
- Weinberg: The Passenger. Orquesta Del Teatro Real De Madrid; Coro Del Teatro Real De Madrid, Mirga Gražinytė-Tyla. 2025, Deutsche Grammophon
