= Mieczysław Weinberg =

Polish and Soviet composer (1919–1996)

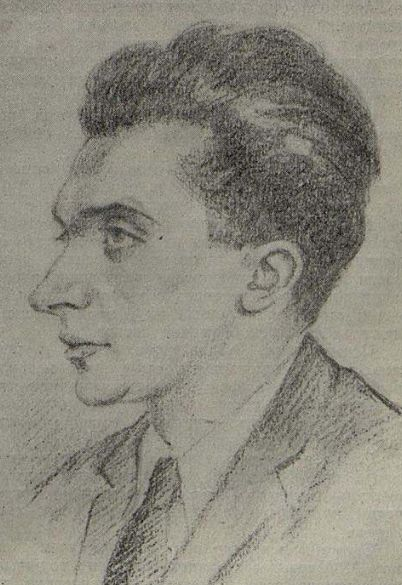
- Pencil portrait of Weinberg, January 1949
- Born: Mojsze Wajnberg; December 8, 1919 (Note: According to Weinberg, he was born on December 8, 1919, but his birth certificate states the date as January 12, 1919. The Polish musicologist and Weinberg biographer, Danuta Gwizdalanka, believes that he was born on December 8, 1918.); Warsaw, Poland
- Died: February 26, 1996 (aged 76); Moscow, Russia
- Resting place: Domodedovo Cemetery
- Other name: Moisei Vainberg
- Citizenship: Polish, Soviet, Russian
- Notable work: List of compositions by Mieczyslaw Weinberg
- Spouses: Natalya Mikhoels (m. 1942; div. 1970) Olga Rakhalskaya (m. 1972)
- Children: 2
- Father: Szmuel Weinberg
- Awards: Honored Artist of the Russian SFSR (1971); People's Artist of the Russian SFSR (1980); USSR State Prize (1990); Meritorious Activist of Culture (1994)

Signature
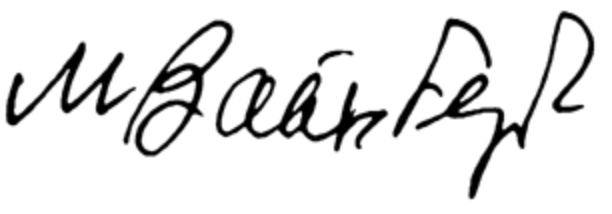

Mieczysław Weinberg (December 8, 1919 – February 26, 1996) was a Polish, Soviet, and Russian composer and pianist. Born in Warsaw to parents who worked in the Yiddish theatre in Poland, his early years were surrounded by music. At the age of 12, he began formal music lessons. Later, he studied piano at the Warsaw Conservatory. In 1939, Weinberg fled Warsaw when Germany invaded Poland and started World War II. His family was later murdered at the Trawniki concentration camp.

Weinberg found refuge in the Soviet Union. He established himself successfully in Moscow with support from Dmitri Shostakovich and the Committee on the Arts. Postwar changes in Soviet cultural policy led to increased persecution of minority groups, including Jews. Although Weinberg's music was well regarded and regularly played, he was surveilled and harassed by the MVD. On February 6, 1953, Weinberg was arrested and jailed at Lubyanka Prison. Intercession on his behalf by Shostakovich and Stalin's death led to Weinberg's release on April 25.

The 1960s were the peak of Weinberg's professional success. Aside from his concert works, his music for film also became well known. His score for Fyodor Khitruk's cartoon Winnie-the-Pooh was an immediate success and the verses sung by its titular character entered the Russian popular lexicon.

In the 1970s, Weinberg's career began to decline, in spite of increased official distinctions. He continued to compose prolifically through the 1980s, but health problems aggravated by the loss of state patronage and healthcare that resulted from the collapse of the Soviet Union left him bedridden in his final years. Belated recognition of his music outside of Russia began in the 1990s through the advocacy of Tommy Persson, a Swedish judge. In 1994, Poland awarded Weinberg the Meritorious Activist of Culture. He converted to Orthodox Christianity a few weeks before his death.

== Spelling and transliteration of name ==
Weinberg's name was registered on his birth certificate as Mojsze Wajnberg. Throughout his adult life, he signed his letters in Polish using the Polish spelling of his surname. During his career in the Yiddish theater of interwar Warsaw, he was known by the German spelling of his name, Mosze Weinberg; a typical convention of the time for Polish musicians who aspired to produce recordings for export. Weinberg adopted the given name Mieczysław professionally at the beginning of his musical career because he believed it sounded more Polish and prestigious.

In the Soviet Union, he was officially known as Moisei Samuilovich Vainberg (Russian: Моисей Самуилович Вайнберг). The name was the result of legal expediency and his personal indifference when he sought to cross the border into the Soviet Union in 1939:

The order came to let the refugees in. Some kind of squad was put together to examine the documents, but quite carelessly, because there were a lot of people. When they came up to me, I was asked: "Last name?"—"Weinberg"—"First?"—"Mieczysław"—"'Mieczysław', what is that? You Jewish?"—"Jewish"—"So 'Moisei' you will be".

In the 1980s, he successfully petitioned to have his legal first name changed back to Mieczysław (Russian: Мечислав, romanized: Mechislav). Among friends in Russia, he would also go by his Polish diminutive "Mietek".

Re-transliteration of the composer's surname from Cyrillic back into the Latin alphabet produces a variety of spellings. "Vainberg" became the most common in the 1990s because of a series of compact disc releases on the Olympia label. Per Skans, the author of their liner notes, had erroneously believed that this was the composer's favored choice. Starting in the 21st century, "Weinberg" became the most widespread spelling. However, there is no evidence that the composer preferred that spelling.

== Biography ==
=== Youth ===
Weinberg was born in Warsaw on December 8, 1919. His father, Szmuel, was a well-known conductor, composer, and violinist at the Jewish Theatre in Warsaw. He had originally come from Kishinev, Bessarabia Governorate (today part of Moldova), which he left shortly before its Jewish community was attacked in the pogrom of 1903, in the course of which Weinberg's grandparents and great-grandparents were killed. Weinberg's mother, Sara (née Sura Dwojra Sztern or Sara Deborah Stern), (Note: Weinberg stated that his mother's maiden surname was Kotlicka. However, documents preserved at the Chopin University of Music, as well as notations in surviving family photographs record her name as Sura Dwojra Sztern.) was Szmuel's second wife. She had been born in Odesa, Kherson Governorate (today part of Ukraine), and was an actress in several Yiddish theater companies in Warsaw and Łódź. One of the composer's cousins, Isay Abramovich Mishne, was the secretary of the Military Revolutionary Committee of the 1918 Baku Commune, and was executed in 1918 along with the other 26 Baku Commissars.

The Weinberg's family home was located in the Wola district, on Krochmalna Street. From an early age, Weinberg was surrounded by music; he later said that "life was [his] first music teacher". At the age of six, he began to accompany his father to musical performances. He taught himself to play the piano at an early age and eventually developed sufficient skill to substitute for his father as conductor at the Jewish Theatre. Weinberg also began to compose, although he did not accord these early works importance:

What does writing music mean to a child? I simply took down one of my father's music sheets and scribbled down something or other... But in this way, I studied music right from my birth, as it were. And when I wrote these "operettas" I probably imagined myself to be a composer.

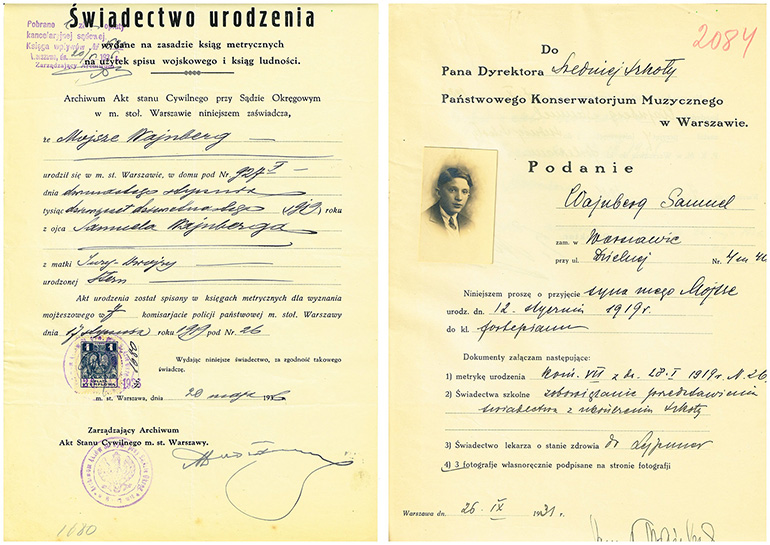
Weinberg's birth certificate with enrollment application into the Warsaw Conservatory

At the age of 12, Weinberg began formal music lessons at a school in Warsaw. His teacher noted his precocity and enrolled him at the Warsaw Conservatory in October 1931, where she felt his talent would be more suitably developed. The identities of Weinberg's teachers during his first two years at the conservatory are no longer known, but in 1933 he became a student of Józef Turczyński, who considered Weinberg to be one of his best students along with Witold Małcużyński. Weinberg graduated in 1939.

Weinberg made his professional debut in a chamber concert organized by the Polish Society for Contemporary Music on December 10, 1936, wherein he was the pianist for the world premiere of Andrzej Panufnik's Piano Trio. His next appearance was in mid-1937, as one of the musicians that performed at the conservatory's annual graduation concert. The students who received diplomas at the event included Witold Lutosławski, Stefan Kisielewski, and Zbigniew Turski. The latter's Piano Concerto was included on the concert program; Weinberg was the soloist. A reviewer praised him as the best performer at the concert and described his playing as "truly manly". That same year, Weinberg also composed music for an early film by Zbigniew Ziembiński, Fredek uszczęśliwia świat, in which he made a brief appearance as a pianist. The film also included songs by his father, who may have conducted the ensemble used for the film's soundtrack.

In May 1938, Weinberg was introduced by Turczyński to his friend, the pianist Josef Hofmann, who held the post of honorary professor at the conservatory and who was then touring Poland. Weinberg played for him Johann Sebastian Bach's Italian Concerto and Mily Balakirev's Islamey. Impressed, Hofmann invited Weinberg to study with him at the Curtis Institute of Music in Philadelphia, for which he promised to obtain an American visa. Ultimately, Weinberg decided to pursue a career as a composer rather than pianist. In the event, he was unable to accept Hofmann's offer because of the invasion of Poland in 1939; Weinberg referred to this as having marked the end of "the best and happiest period" of his life.

=== Escape from Poland ===
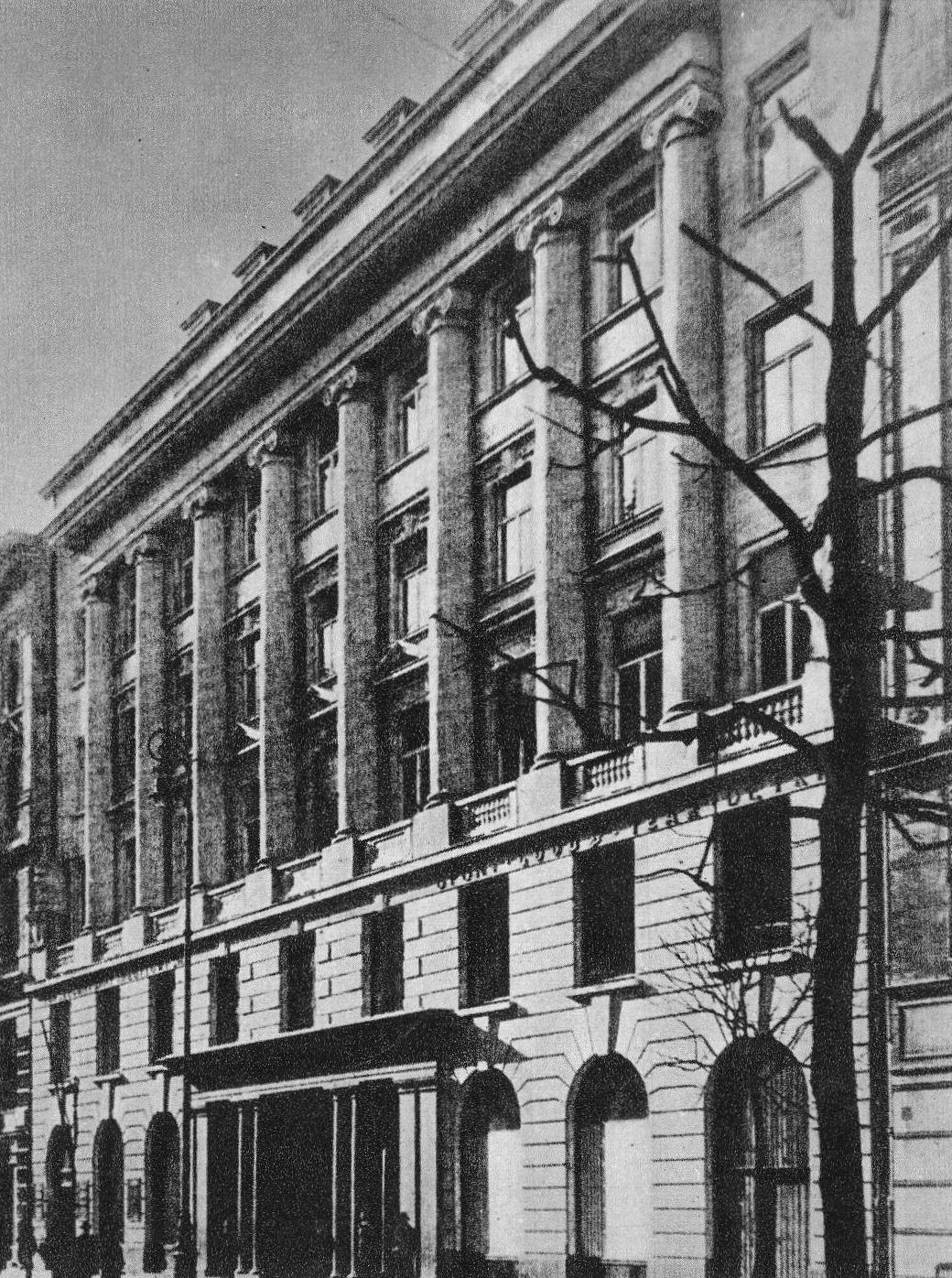
Façade of the Café Adria (c. late 1930s), where Weinberg worked before the war.

Despite the outbreak of war, Weinberg maintained his daily routine and believed the assurances of Polish propaganda that Poland would emerge victorious against Germany's invasion. Late night on September 6, 1939, Weinberg returned home from the Café Adria, where he worked as a pianist. As he ate the meal that his mother had prepared for him, he heard a radio announcement from Roman Umiastowski that the Wehrmacht had broken through Polish defenses and urged all able-bodied men to join the Polish Army. The broadcast set off a panic in Warsaw. The next morning, Weinberg left with his sister and headed eastwards towards the Soviet Union. In mid-journey, his sister decided to return home because her shoes were badly hurting her feet. Weinberg never saw her and his parents again. It was not until 1966, during his only subsequent trip to Poland, that he learned from surviving former neighbors that his family had been murdered at the Trawniki concentration camp.

Weinberg's trek to the Soviet Union took him seventeen days. He escaped wartime dangers along the way, but witnessed other refugees who did not and died. One incident occurred near the Soviet–Polish border:

Two or three Jews were walking along the road; their clothing revealed that they were Jews. In that moment, a motorcycle came along. A German got off and, from the gesticulation, we understood that he was asking for the way somewhere. They showed him precisely... He probably said "Danke schön", sat down again, started the engine, and as the Jews resumed walking, to send them on their way he threw a hand grenade, which tore them to shreds. I could have easily died the same way. On the whole, dying was easy.

On October 3, Weinberg arrived at the border. He recalled the gratitude that he and other refugees felt and that they "blessed the Red Army which could save [them] from death".

=== Refugee in the Soviet Union ===
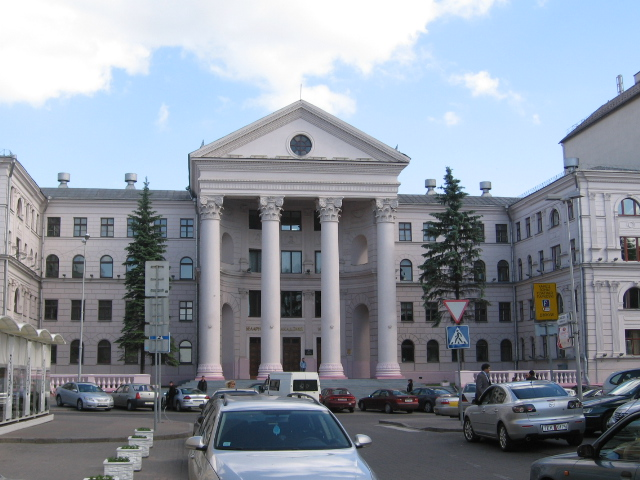
The Minsk Conservatory in 2010

Weinberg arrived in the Soviet Union with few personal belongings aside from some of his musical manuscripts and family photographs. His poor health excluded him from consideration for military service. It is believed that before he settled in Minsk, he first journeyed through Brest, then Pinsk, and Luninets; he composed his Piano Sonata No. 1 in the latter town, which he nicknamed the work after. Weinberg and other recent Polish immigrants were granted Soviet citizenship by local authorities in Minsk. This permitted him the privilege to enroll at the Minsk Conservatory. He became one of Vasily Zolotarev's composition students. Weinberg also studied counterpoint, music history, harmony, orchestration, and conducting. His classmates included Eta Tyrmand, Genrikh Wagner, and Ryszard Sielicki. According to Lev Abeliovich, Weinberg was considered the best student. He settled into a room at the conservatory's dormitory. His roommate was Alexei Klumov, a pianist and alumnus of Heinrich Neuhaus. Klumov gave lessons in the Russian language to Weinberg, who quickly became fluent. After school, Weinberg worked as a pianist. He sometimes partnered in duet with Tyrmand, with whom he played medleys of themes from popular American films.

Zolotarev had been taught composition by Nikolai Rimsky-Korsakov and, through him, inherited the traditions of the Mighty Handful, particularly their use of folk music idioms. In turn, Weinberg absorbed these influences and began turning to Jewish folklore and music for inspiration. Pleased at the young man's abilities, Zolotarev described Weinberg as "a charming and handsome young man, very (extraordinarily) talented". Concern for Weinberg's health and finances led Zolotarev to solicit help for him from the Committee on the Arts. This led to Weinberg being sent to Moscow as one of the participating delegates for the Festival of Byelorussian Art in June 1940. Through Klumov, Weinberg was introduced to Nikolai Myaskovsky:

I remember how astonished I was [at meeting Myaskovsky], this first impression stayed with me my whole life. I was twenty years old back then and he was in his fifties, I think. He seemed a little old man to me. As I made to leave, he suddenly picked up my coat and helped me. I was completely dumbfounded and my hands trembled: "What are you doing, what are you doing?" And he uttered a famous phrase to me: "That is how we do things around here".

On June 22, 1941, the Germans began their invasion of the Soviet Union. All men were ordered to report to local military offices for duty. Weinberg was again exempted from military service, with his Pott's disease cited as the reason. On July 23, he received his diploma from the conservatory; it was signed by Vissarion Shebalin, the chairman of the Moscow branch of the Union of Soviet Composers. Along with his diploma, Weinberg gathered his manuscripts and family photographs, then fled Minsk with his friend Klumov. Although Weinberg was initially refused permission to leave by the authorities, he obtained forged documents from Klumov that certified him as a music teacher. With these he was able to travel as far as his finances permitted—to Tashkent in the Uzbek SSR. Most of the State Symphony Orchestra of the Byelorussian SSR musicians who had not been able to leave Minsk were killed in the subsequent German bombing and capture of the city.

=== Tashkent ===
Circumstances in Tashkent during the Great Patriotic War were difficult. The first wave of refugees who arrived in the city found plenteous food and places to live. This gave rise to a popular saying at the time, "Tashkent has bread in abundance". As the war progressed, however, nationwide supply shortages and a growing population of evacuees from elsewhere in the Soviet Union strained the city's resources. Housing and food became scarce; crime rates soared. The sight of people dead in the street from starvation was not uncommon.

In spite of these challenges, when Weinberg and Klumov disembarked in Taskent in July 1941, they were determined to secure employment and ration cards for themselves. With his skills as a piano soloist and ensemble player, as well as composer, Weinberg was in an advantageous position. He was quickly hired by the Uzbek SSR State Opera and Ballet Theatre as a tutor and répétiteur. Later, through his friendship with the Uzbek composer Tokhtasyn Dzhalilov, Weinberg was engaged to work jointly with Klumov and four other Uzbek composers on the creation of The Sword of Uzbekistan, a socialist realist opera with Uzbek folk music themes. They counted among their collaborators Mutal Burhonov, who in 1947 composed the "Anthem of the Uzbek SSR" (later adapted as the "State Anthem of Uzbekistan"). The opera, whose plot combined Uzbek national myths that were modified to support the Soviet war effort, has since been lost.

On August 4, 1941, while work proceeded on the opera, Weinberg attended a party hosted by Flora Syrkina, the second wife of the artist Alexander Tyshler. It was there that Weinberg met Natalya Mikhoels, the daughter of Solomon Mikhoels, the actor and director of GOSET. Weinberg married Natalya in 1942. They moved into a dormitory on the campus of Academy of Sciences of the Uzbek SSR, which they shared with Mikhoels and his wife. Weinberg's marriage into the family of Mikhoels, who was then at the peak of his career as leader of the Jewish Anti-Fascist Committee, significantly improved the composer's social and financial standing. He intensely admired and respected his father-in-law, to whom he dedicated his Violin Sonata No. 1 composed in 1943. In turn, Mikhoels strove to find any information for Weinberg about the fate of his family, but was unsuccessful. It was only through a meeting with the trumpeter Eddie Rosner, a fellow Polish immigrant who was touring Tashkent and had also played at the Café Adria before the war, that he learned his family had been deported from Warsaw by train to an unknown destination. This would be all Weinberg knew about his family's fate until 1966.

Weinberg composed his Symphony No. 1 in late 1942; he dedicated it to the Red Army. Despite being unperformed in public until 1967, the work was of decisive importance in Weinberg's life. Around the time of the symphony's composition, the faculty of the Leningrad Conservatory was evacuated to Tashkent. Israel Finkelstein, a former teaching assistant to Shostakovich, met Weinberg and was greatly impressed by his music. Afterwards, Finkelstein conveyed his opinions on Weinberg to Shostakovich. His enthusiasm provoked Shostakovich's curiosity, who requested to see some of Weinberg's scores. Another member of the conservatory staff, Yuri Levitin, a former Shostakovich pupil, also befriended Weinberg in Tashkent. It was to him that Weinberg consigned a copy of his Symphony No. 1 to give to Shostakovich. Weinberg may have also been assisted by Mikhoels, who had a friendly relationship with the composer. A few weeks later, Weinberg received an official invitation from the Committee on the Arts to come to Moscow.

=== Wartime success ===
Weinberg's Symphony No. 1 was performed in September 1943 for the Union of Soviet Composers. Myaskovsky was among those who heard the work; he described it as "talented, technically fine, but without warmth". Weinberg and his family arrived in Moscow in October. They briefly settled into an apartment on Tverskoy Boulevard, where his father-in-law Mikhoels had lived prior to the war, before they moved into another home on Nikitsky Boulevard. On October 3, the couple's only child, Viktoria, was born; her name was symbolic of their hope for Soviet victory in the war.

According to Weinberg's later reminiscences, he first met Shostakovich in person in October. He was received at the latter's apartment located on Myasnitskaya Street. Waiting with Shostakovich was his friend, the musicologist and arts critic Ivan Sollertinsky. Weinberg played for them a piano reduction of his Symphony No. 1, to which Shostakovich replied with a few appreciative comments. The meeting established a friendship between the composers that endured until Shostakovich's death. Weinberg thereafter was entrusted as a partner in many of the first hearings of Shostakovich's orchestral music in reductions for piano four-hands. Soon after this meeting, Weinberg was accepted into the Union of Soviet Composers. The benefits he received as a member permitted him to focus on composing full-time, as well as allowed him access to food and products unobtainable to ordinary Soviet citizens. Weinberg's newfound comfort, which contrasted sharply with his financial and professional standing in prewar Poland, also coincided with a gradual return to normalcy in everyday Soviet life.

By the time the Soviet Union emerged victorious in the war against Germany in 1945, Weinberg's career appeared to be headed in an auspicious direction.

=== Postwar ===
The announcement that proclaimed the Allied victory in Europe was broadcast over all radio stations in the Soviet Union on the night of May 9, 1945. Weinberg and his family were at the Mikhoels home when they heard the news. Weinberg's wife said that she ran downstairs to tell her father. He replied:

"It is not enough to win the war. Now the world will need to be won and that is much more difficult". With those words, he cooled our elation; and we would have the chance to see how much truth there was in his words for the rest of our lives.

Weinberg's professional reputation continued to increase in the immediate postwar period. He was in demand as both composer and performer. He was also chosen by Kara Karayev, Nikolai Peiko, and Yuri Shaporin, among others, to perform in premieres of their new works. As a composer he was supported by Shostakovich and Myaskovsky.

Beyond these personal successes, major shifts in Soviet cultural policy were taking place. Increased repression and marginalization of minority groups was signaled in 1946 when Jewish candidates for the Supreme Soviet of the Soviet Union were pressured to withdraw. Andrei Zhdanov led campaigns against formalism in the fields of literature and film in 1946; this resulted in the censure of Anna Akhmatova, Mikhail Zoshchenko, and Sergei Eisenstein. From October 2 to 8, a smaller campaign took place within the Union of Soviet Composers. Under the guises of encouraging composers to seek "more creative guidance" and to develop "closer ties between Soviet composers and Soviet reality", the campaign was designed to subjugate Soviet music to the purposes of propaganda. Lev Knipper took the stage to admonish Weinberg and Jānis Ivanovs at one of the meetings:

A slackening of bonds between formal mastery and richness of ideas... This is a dangerous tendency. Our youth has to learn from the elder generation about the importance of ideology.

Shaporin, Shostakovich, and Aram Khachaturian reacted by defending Weinberg. Instead, they urged, he needed the assistance of his colleagues to bring his musical style into alignment with the expectations of Soviet officialdom. Khachaturian expanded on this point by saying that critics who had praised Weinberg had done him a disservice by not balancing their views with diagnoses of his shortcomings. He also implored Weinberg to explore his "national melos", which the Armenian composer remarked was used "extremely rarely".

In spite of this suggestion, Weinberg showed little interest in exploring folk music idioms. Excepting his Festive Pictures for orchestra, the music he composed immediately after these remarks, instead, continued to pursue and refine stylistic traits that he had established during the war. Other works that may have reflected his acceptance of Khachaturian's advice are now partially or entirely lost.

=== Persecution and arrest ===
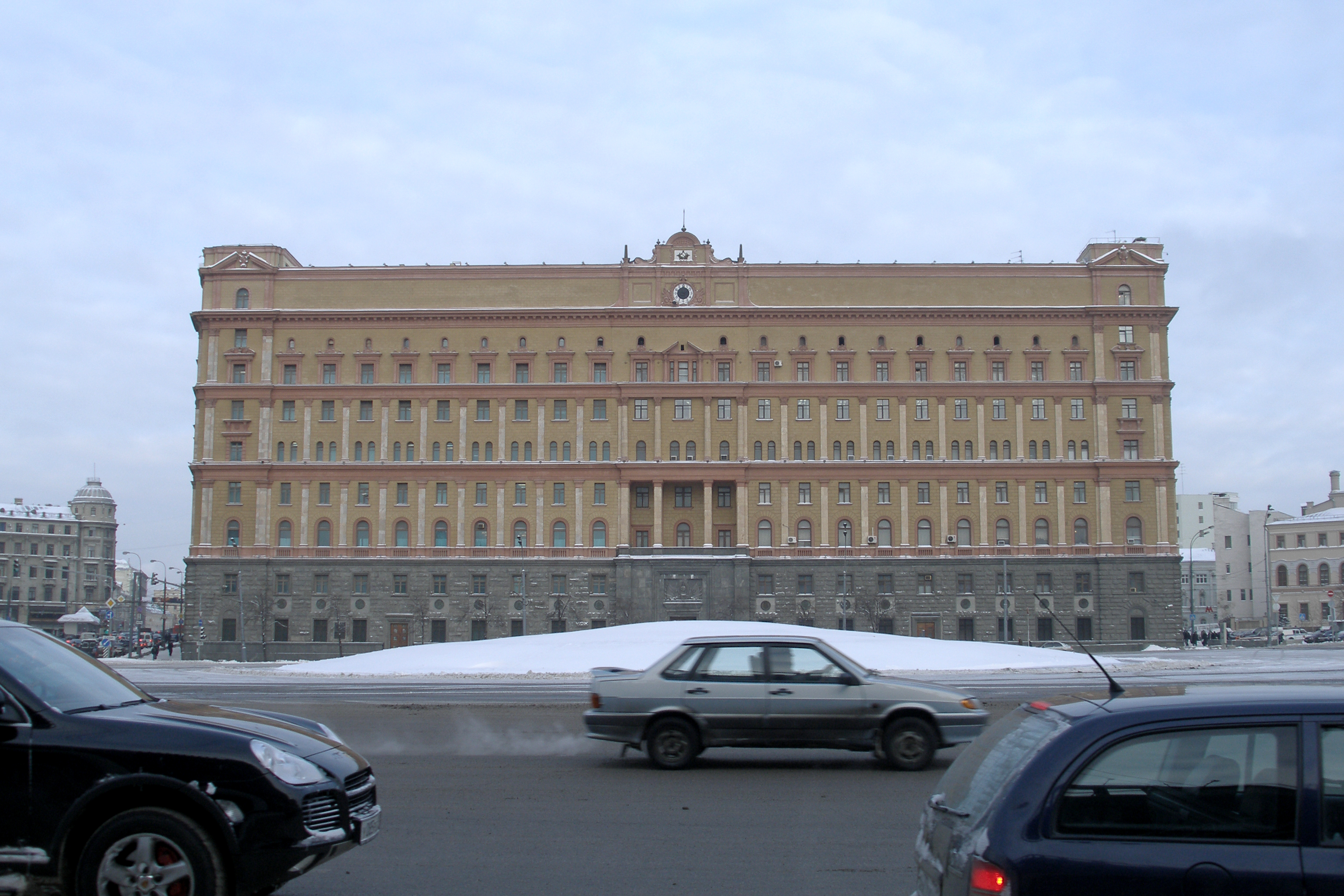
Weinberg was jailed at the Lubyanka Prison in early 1953

On January 5, 1948, Joseph Stalin and members of the Politburo attended the Bolshoi Theatre for a performance of the opera The Great Friendship by the Georgian composer Vano Muradeli. For reasons that are unknown, the opera outraged Stalin, who immediately directed Andrei Zhdanov to organize a wider and renewed campaign against musical formalism. A few days later, on January 12, Weinberg's father-in-law Mikhoels was murdered in Minsk on the orders of Stalin. The actor had been lured to his death by the critic and covert MVD informant, Vladimir Golubov; both were killed in what was officially ruled a traffic accident. Mikhoels' body was returned to Moscow and given a state funeral. Lazar Kaganovich surreptitiously conveyed to Weinberg's family his condolences, but urged them not to inquire any further about the actor's death. Weinberg was placed under constant MVD surveillance, regularly harassed by the police, and had his travel privileges curtailed.

Meanwhile, the ongoing anti-formalist campaign in music necessitated a convocation of the Union of Soviet Composers. Tikhon Khrennikov, who was appointed general secretary of the union, led the proceedings, but refused to engage in anti-Semitic tactics. This resulted in a number of anonymous letters accusing him of having sold out the interests of Soviet culture. On February 10, the Politburo published its "Resolution on the Opera 'The Great Friendship'" in Pravda. This was followed on February 14 by a ruling that listed composers and works banned from performance. Although Weinberg was not one of the six composers who were the campaign's most prominent targets, his music for children was censured. He was also further compromised professionally by his association with Shostakovich, who had been among the six denounced composers.

In spite of these developments, Weinberg appeared to have no cause for concern about his personal welfare. One of his works, the Sinfonietta No. 1, was received warmly by the press. It was also praised by Khrennikov after it was performed at the December 1948 plenum of the Union of Composers:

Shining evidence of the fruitfulness of the path to realism is to be found in the Sinfonietta by Weinberg, a composer who used to be under the powerful influence of modernistic art which distorted his unquestionable talent in an ugly way. Turning to the sources of Jewish folk music, Weinberg has created a brilliant work full of joie de vivre and devoted to the joyous, free working life of Jewish people in the Land of Socialism. In this work Weinberg has revealed outstanding skill and richness of imagination.

The work soon established itself as a part of the Soviet orchestral repertoire and was one of Weinberg's most played works through the mid-1950s. Another work, the cantata In My Native Land, which set texts that glorified Stalin, was conducted by Alexander Gauk. Weinberg also composed a number of other populist works during the late 1940s, but suppressed them from being performed. Other works, like the Violin Sonatina composed for Leonid Kogan, were only first played years later. Much of Weinberg's energies in these years were devoted to music for films and the circus; the latter was considered by the Soviet government to be second only to the film industry in importance.

Around Weinberg, official persecution of Jews intensified. In November 1948, the government dissolved the Jewish Anti-Fascist Committee and arrested several of its members. Benjamin Zuskin, Mikhoels' successor at GOSET, was arrested in February 1950. He was interrogated by authorities about Weinberg, but told them he knew little except that he knew he was a composer, one of Shostakovich's friends, and that Khrennikov considered him a "formalist". Zuskin's arrest led Weinberg and his wife to believe that their arrest would soon follow. One of his wife's relatives, Miron Vovsi, was arrested in late January 1953 and accused of being one of the conspirators in the "doctors' plot".

On February 6, Weinberg attended a performance of his Rhapsody on Moldavian Themes in an arrangement for violin and orchestra played by David Oistrakh. After the concert, Weinberg went back to his home for a late night meal accompanied by Nikolai Peiko, Boris Tchaikovsky, and his wife. At 2:00 a.m., the police arrived with an arrest warrant for Weinberg. When the composer demanded to know why he was being arrested, the police replied that it was because of allegations of "Jewish bourgeois nationalism". He got dressed, stated to his friends that he was innocent, and surrendered himself into police custody. His office was sealed and his apartment was searched until the morning. In a 1995 interview with the musicologist Manashir Yakubov, Weinberg recalled:

But back then I was still a cocky young guy strutting around, so I said to [to the police], "But I don't even know a single letter of the Hebrew alphabet, and I have two thousand books in Polish." "Might as well go with Polish bourgeois nationalism then — we know better than you!" was the reply. I was placed in solitary confinement. You could only sit. You weren't permitted to lie down. At nighttime, a bright light would sometimes shine right in my eyes, making sleep impossible.

Fear of torture impelled him to admit culpability to whatever charges he was accused of, irrespective of their plausibility. These included accusations of digging a tunnel to England under his home in order to flee the country. His wife inquired regularly with officials at the Lubyanka Prison to determine Weinberg's state and to ensure that he was alive. She was soon contacted by Shostakovich, who informed her that he vouched for Weinberg's innocence in a personal letter to Lavrenty Beria. Shostakovich also arranged to assume power of attorney over the Weinbergs' affairs and the responsibility of raising their daughter in the event that Natalya was also arrested. Matters changed course after Stalin's death on March 5, an event which Weinberg did not learn of until weeks later. He was released from jail on April 25.

=== Khrushchev Thaw ===
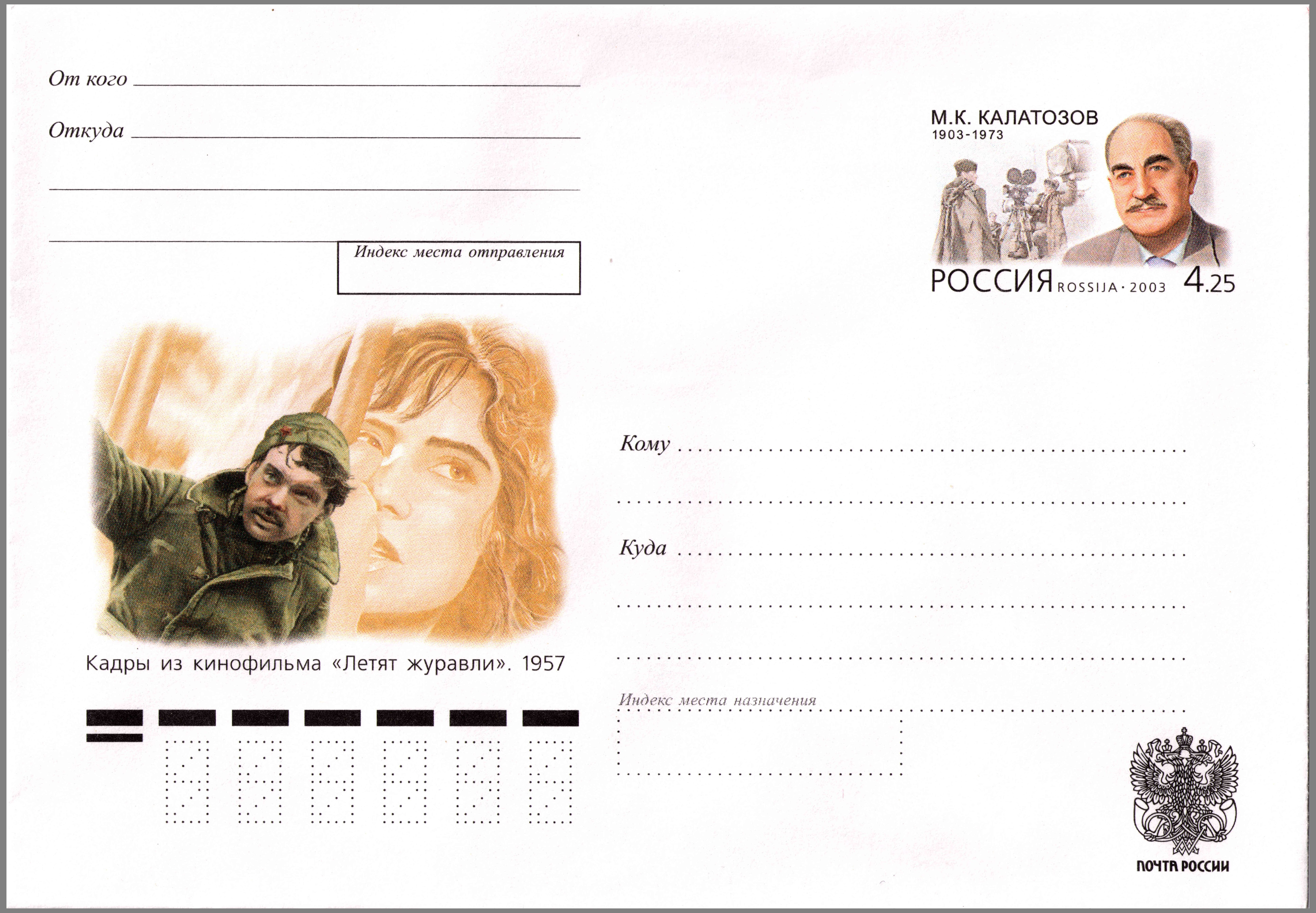
This 2003 Russian commemorative envelope and stamp depict the film The Cranes are Flying (center left) and its director Mikhail Kalatozov (upper right). Weinberg's score for the film was a great success.

Following the composition of the Overture for orchestra soon after his release from prison, Weinberg temporarily shifted his creative efforts away from concert works. Those that he did compose tended to be chamber music, which by their relative economy of resources were more likely to be performed. Instead, he concentrated on composing music for films and cartoons. His score for the 1954 film Tiger Girl, starring Lyudmila Kasatkina in the title role, became successful enough that he extracted an orchestral suite for concert performances. The resulting suite became one of his most often performed works, with only the Rhapsody on Moldavian Themes exceeding it in popularity. Another successful film score was the one he composed for The Last Inch, a drama directed by Nikita Kurikhin and Teodor Vulfovich; the music secured the film its enduring fame in Russia. The writer Mikhail Veller, who saw the film in his childhood, recalled it and its music:

It [sent] chills down my spine, needles pricking me in the chest and knees, a spasm in my throat, tears in my eyes, hope, grim delight, and joy. We could not know the word "catharsis". I do not think you can comprehend what it meant to a nine-year-old to see The Last Inch for the first time: in the Soviet Union, behind the Iron Curtain, without television, virtually no radio, without any commercials, and in totalitarian-filtered austerity; everything is Soviet, nothing is foreign, imported, capitalist, unfamiliar, in this rarefied space—a movie theatre. It was a revelation, a shock, a bitter tragedy with an exalted conclusion that was ripped from destiny. It was a song we all sang. Soon a record came out and I bought it. Music by Weinberg, lyrics by Sobol The bass, a soloist with the Kiev Philharmonic Orchestra, Mikhail Ryba. The harps (!) began to strum, the basses entered, and a piano solo rattled the nerves at the heights of its passages.

His most notable feature film music success was his score to the 1957 war drama by Mikhail Kalatozov, The Cranes are Flying. A contemporary Soviet film encyclopedia praised Weinberg for the skill and precision with which he used his music, which it described as being guided by "dreams, love, and hope". The score, which includes a sequence for piano and orchestra in the style of Richard Addinsell's Warsaw Concerto, became so popular in the Soviet Union that there was great demand for arrangements of it in various styles.

Weinberg also composed incidental music for a theatrical production of Honoré de Balzac's Les Ressources de Quinola. Some of Weinberg's notable concert works of the period include his Piano Sonata No. 4, Partita, and Violin Sonata No. 5, the latter dedicated to Shostakovich.

As a pianist, Weinberg was involved as one of the principal figures in the dissemination and early reception of Shostakovich's Symphony No. 10 in 1954. Weinberg first played it with the composer in an arrangement for piano four-hands for selected staff and students at the Moscow Conservatory. They later played it for Yevgeny Mravinsky, who subsequently conducted the symphony's premiere, and then for a session in April of the Leningrad branch of the RSFSR Union of Composers. At the latter performance, the symphony provoked intense debate, to which Weinberg replied in its defense. That same year, Weinberg and Shostakovich made a recording, which the former later described as a "treasure, a kind of talisman". They also made a private recording of Shostakovich's 24 Preludes and Fugues in an arrangement for four-hands, but recording nor arrangement are both considered lost.

A 1955 ballet, The Golden Key, based on the eponymous children's tale by Alexei Tolstoy that was itself adapted from Carlo Collodi's Pinocchio, became Weinberg's major work of the era. The work had originated from music Weinberg had composed for a "vaudeville for children" by the writer Vadim Korostolyov; its success led to the commissioning of The Golden Key. The ballet was described by the musicologist Nataliya Gounko as a "grandchild" of Igor Stravinsky's Petrushka.

As Weinberg's reputation and income improved during the late 1950s, he indulged in his delight in shopping for clothes and second-hand books. His daughter Viktoria described him in these years as cutting the figure of a "real Polish dandy".

=== "Stellar years" ===
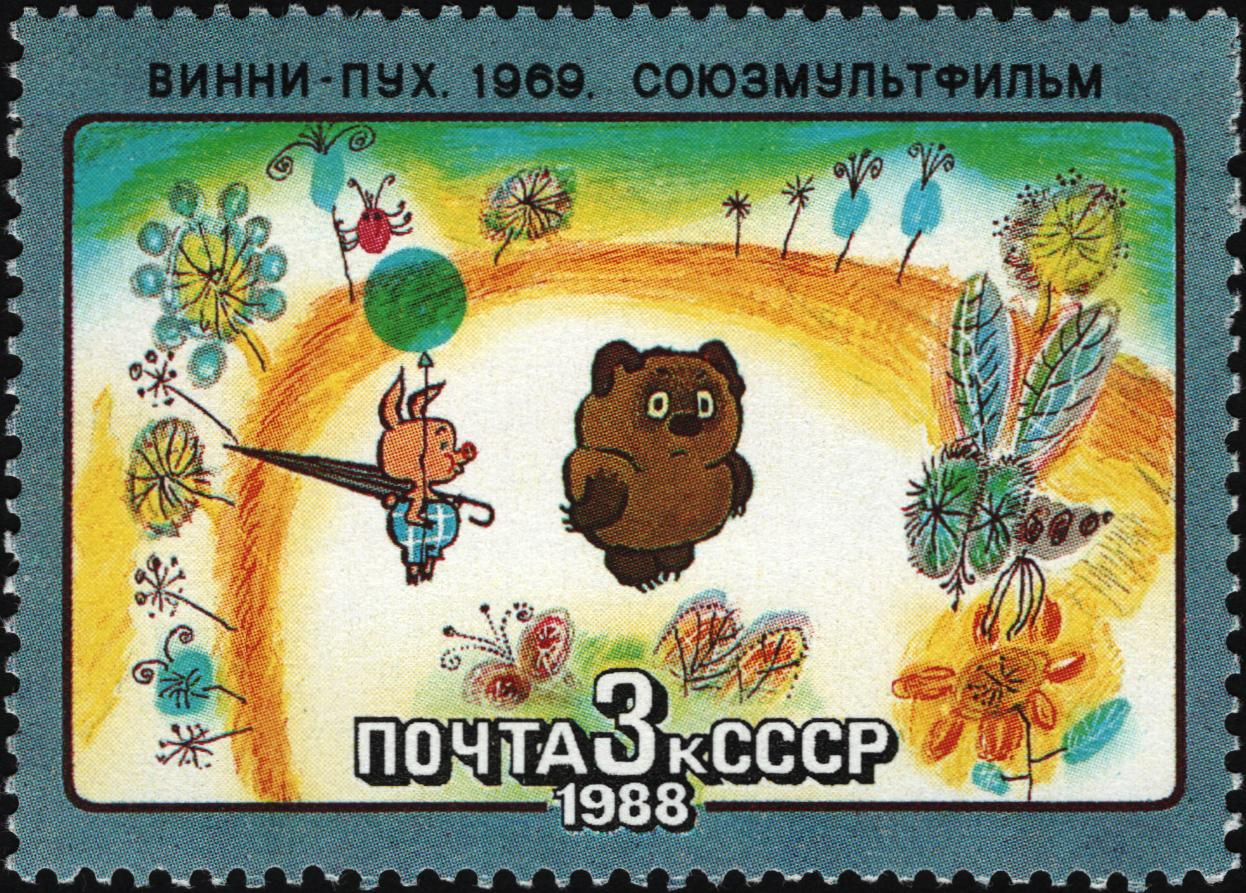
1988 Soviet commemorative stamp of Winnie-the-Pooh

Success and intense productivity marked Weinberg's life in the 1960s. He received renewed support from the RSFSR Union of Composers, through the auspices of Muzfond, as well as access to the union's circuit of creative resorts across the Soviet Union. Weinberg composed a number of important works, including his Symphony No. 10 and String Quartet No. 12, at the resort in Dilijan, Armenian SSR. However, his favorite was in the town of Ruza, near Moscow. During visits there between 1953 and 1983, Weinberg composed four symphonies, three string quartets, six instrumental sonatas, the opera Congratulations!, and numerous other works. Increased royalties from performances of his concert music in combination with steady film work, which was the most profitable available to Soviet composers, provided Weinberg with the freedom to earn a comfortable living from composition alone.

The decade augured a streak of symphonic triumphs that began with the premiere of the Symphony No. 3 conducted by Alexander Gauk on March 23, 1960. With the Symphony No. 5 of 1962, Weinberg reached his maturity as a symphonic composer. According to the musicologist Lyudmila Nikitina, who had first met the composer in the early 1960s, the symphony crystallized procedures that Weinberg would continue to use throughout his life; wherein he drew from personal experience, treated the act of creation as a "mirror of his individual perception", and produced music of social significance. The non-vocal symphonies that followed, Nos. 7 and 10, were by their chamber orchestra scoring comparatively restrained in its use of resources. The latter was enthusiastically praised by Shostakovich, while the former shows traces of being influenced by the sonorism that was characteristic of the emerging new Polish music.

Weinberg's music was occasionally heard and his career reported on in his native Poland. A 1964 issue of the bi-monthly music magazine Ruch Muzyczny mentioned that he was a highly regarded composer in the Soviet Union whose name was often mentioned in connection with Shostakovich. In 1963, Weinberg's String Quartet No. 8 was played by the Komitas Quartet at that year's Warsaw Autumn. Audiences and critics considered the work old-fashioned and mostly ignored it. In 1966, an ultimately aborted attempt by Kirill Kondrashin to conduct Weinberg's Symphony No. 8 with the Moscow Philharmonic Orchestra on tour in Poland led to the composer's first and only visit to the country of his birth since the war. Accompanied by his friend Tchaikovsky, Weinberg walked through the streets of Warsaw. Although he found his family home still standing, he was appalled as much by how the city had transformed as it had remained the same. Of its restored prewar buildings, Weinberg likened them to empty shells bereft of souls. "His great disappointment", said the composer Krzysztof Meyer, who befriended Weinberg on this trip, "was that the city he knew no longer existed". Despite much searching, he found virtually nobody who had known him before the war, aside from his former classmate Turski. He also finally learned about his family's death. Weinberg's feelings of unease on this trip were reinforced by the snubbing he received from most Polish composers; an outcome that was based on their perceptions of him as a stylistic reactionary and a member of the Soviet establishment, as well as their general suspicion of Russian culture. This did not preclude his enjoyment of their works such as Grażyna Bacewicz's String Quartet No. 7 and Krzysztof Penderecki's St. Luke Passion, which he heard at that year's installment of the Warsaw Autumn. All the same, the visit left him disillusioned: he came to the conclusion that there was no country for him to return to.

Throughout the 1960s, Weinberg continued to compose music for films and cartoons. While the feature films he scored in those years did not attain a similar level of fame to those he scored in the 1950s, his music for the 1969 adaptation of Winnie-the-Pooh directed by Fyodor Khitruk became an instant favorite with Soviet audiences; it has since been recognized as the best known of all his cartoon scores. Weinberg's music continued to be renowned in Russia long after the cartoon's release, with the verses sung by its titular character entering the popular lexicon. The composer said that off all his music for films and cartoons, Winnie-the-Pooh contributed the most to the preservation of his legacy. One commentator described the cartoon's patter songs as being so simple that they could have been created by a child; another held them up as a "salient example of early Soviet rap".

From the vantage point of an interview in 1994, Weinberg looked back on the 1960s with fondness. He referred to the decade as his "stellar years".

=== Transitions, setbacks, and honors ===
In the mid-1960s, Weinberg began an extramarital affair with Olga Rakhalskaya, daughter of the psychiatrist Yuliy Rakhalsky, that quickly developed into a romantic relationship. The couple had been introduced to each other to by Weinberg's daughter Viktoria, who was Rakhalskaya's classmate at Moscow State University. Weinberg divorced his wife Natalya in 1970 after dithering on the matter for a long period; she and their daughter emigrated to Israel in 1972. That same year, he married Rakhalskaya, who had given birth to their daughter Anna in 1971. Many of his peers and friends, who respected Natalya's family and its legacy, shunned the composer after his divorce. Shostakovich was one of his few friends who remained supportive. There is no evidence that Weinberg's career suffered as a direct result of his divorce and new marriage.

The rupture of Weinberg's first marriage notwithstanding, his personal life stabilized in his later years, dominated mostly by work and increasingly illness. He continued to enjoy steady income from film work, which permitted him to continue composing full-time, although he complained that it occupied too much of his time. Olga described Weinberg as thinking nothing else but of musical work during these years:

He worked every single minute, day and night. If he wasn't sleeping, he was working. Even in his sleep. When he was dozing off he would often drum his fingers without realizing it, as though they were grasping the piano keys. That's why there are no memorable data in his biography: the only important landmarks in his life are what he composed.

Much of Weinberg's time during these years was spent in his unsuccessful attempts to stage his opera The Passenger, based on the 1962 eponymous novel by Zofia Posmysz, which in turn she had adapted from her original radio play. The novel was translated into Russian and published in the Soviet Union in 1963. One of its admirers was Shostakovich, who discerned the novel's potential as a basis for an opera. He shared a copy with the writer Alexander Medvedev who, in turn, gave it to Weinberg. Its plot, about a former Auschwitz guard who believes she sees a long-dead inmate while traveling on an ocean liner, may have reminded Weinberg of a similar incident that had occurred to him while he met with Małcużyński, when the composer became agitated upon seeing one of the jailers from his 1953 arrest sitting nearby at a restaurant. Despite the enthusiastic approval of the board of the RSFSR Union of Composers, including Rodion Shchedrin, Shostakovich, Khrennikov, and Sviridov—who as union chairman praised the opera as being "written with the heart's blood"—plans for a premiere at the Bolshoi Theatre were rejected by the Ministry of Culture. Later research has neither been able to determine a cause for this decision, nor other later rejections of proposed performances elsewhere in the Soviet Union.

Exponents of Weinberg's music began to diminish or lose influence in the 1970s. His friend Sviridov's term as chairman of the RSFSR Union of Composers ended in 1973; he was not reelected. A more serious loss was the death of Shostakovich on August 9, 1975. The two composers were in close contact almost to the very end; their mutual amity evident in that Weinberg's name is the one that appeared the most in Shostakovich's diary. In 1976, Weinberg composed his Symphony No. 12 in Shostakovich's memory and asked Kondrashin to conduct its premiere. The conductor had previously balked at Weinberg's vocal symphonies. When he was offered the Symphony No. 12, he accused the composer of having become "arid, variable in quality, and expressionless" since his Symphony No. 8. He stipulated furthermore that he would only conduct the Symphony No. 12 contingent on extensive cuts to the score to be approved by him. Exasperated by Kondrashin's behavior, Weinberg terminated his friendship with him. Another friendship that ended was with Rostropovich, for whom the 24 Preludes for solo cello had been intended. By the time of its composition in 1968, his relationship with Weinberg worsened to the point that he never performed the work, despite having edited it for publication. Weinberg said near the end of his life that Rostropovich had become "too busy" to play his music. Rostropovich, on the other hand, said little other than calling Weinberg "a coward". Other performers who regularly played Weinberg's music, like Barshai, had emigrated. Still, he acquired a few new advocates, including Maxim Shostakovich and Vladimir Fedoseyev; the latter became a close friend and was entrusted with a series of premieres in the last decades of the composer's life.

Concurrently, Weinberg received in 1971 the first of his official honors, Honored Artist of the RSFSR, and was written about widely in the musical press. He found contentment in life with his second wife and daughter, with whom he often spent time with in excursions to the town of Valentinovka outside of Moscow.

=== Final years ===
In 1980, Weinberg was awarded the People's Artist of the RSFSR. His career, nevertheless, declined significantly in his last years. His friendship with Boris Tchaikovsky worsened, despite living in the same apartment building, and finally ruptured over what Olga described as "pseudo-ideological reasons". Poor health prevented Weinberg from socializing and attending concerts; he became increasingly reclusive as a result. Changes in leadership at the Union of Composers also affected Weinberg professionally. He described his life and outlook during this period in a letter to Sviridov dated March 29, 1981:

As always, I work. I live quieter than a mouse, keeping a low profile. ... I now get sick often. People upset me more and more. I do not hope for anything and expect nothing.

In another letter to Sviridov dated January 5, 1988, Weinberg expressed his dismay at how quickly loneliness became entrenched into his life, especially after the activity he experienced in the 1960s. "I do not lament it and accept it as a fact of life", he added.

His interest in new musical developments continued and he sought out personal acquaintance with some of the composers of the Soviet and Polish avant-garde, including Sofia Gubaidulina, Alfred Schnittke, and Penderecki; he developed a cordial rapport with the latter two. In a 1988 interview, he named Sergei Berinsky, Vladimir Dovgan, Elena Firsova, Andrei Golovin, Vasily Lobanov, Alexander Raskatov, Vladimir Ryabov, Tatyana Sergeyeva, and Dmitri Smirnov as his favorite young Soviet composers.

After being diagnosed with Crohn's disease in the late 1980s, Weinberg's health sharply deteriorated. In 1990, he was awarded the USSR State Prize, his last Soviet honor. Despite discomfort from health problems, including a fever, Weinberg attended the ceremony at the Kremlin, which was broadcast on television. By the time of the collapse of the Soviet Union in 1991, his creative energies diminished. The change from a communist to capitalist system had an immediate and adverse effect on Weinberg. Dependent on state support his whole life, he was immediately left without any sources of income after the new Russian Federation halted funding for the renamed Union of Russian Composers. Fedoseyev, Raskatov, and Shostakovich's widow, Irina, were among those who thereafter provided Weinberg and his family with financial support.

Of more immediate concern was the loss of state healthcare. The Russian medical system had deteriorated to such a degree that he could not receive treatment after breaking his hip at his apartment in late 1992. Henceforth, he was homebound; in the last two years of his life he was bedridden. His wife Olga quit her job in order to devote herself to his care.

Belated recognition outside of Russia finally came at the very end of Weinberg's life, facilitated by Tommy Persson, a Swedish judge who learned about the composer from reading Boris Schwartz's Music and Musical Life in Soviet Russia: 1917–1970. In the 1990s, Persson was the foremost promoter of the composer's music outside of Russia. On December 8, 1994, Weinberg received at his apartment a delegation from the Polish Embassy in Russia, who awarded him the Meritorious Activist of Culture. Eugeniusz Mielcarek, then a cultural attaché, recalled:

The composer was weak, bedridden, and evidently exhausted by illness, but calm. ... During my two-hour visit, he was clearly animated and interested in our conversation. He asked me about Polish composers, regretted that he could not return to Poland, and stressed his hope that his pieces could be performed in Poland. I officially informed him about awarding him the Polish medal and asked if I might decorate him. He agreed. It was an unconventional ceremony, but at the same time very emotional. When I was pinning the decoration on him, I saw that he did not hide the fact that he was very moved. ... "I have to complain to you about the Creator", said [he]. "As you can see, his idea of old age was not a success".

On March 8, 1995, Vadim Altskan, a representative of the United States Holocaust Memorial Museum, presented Weinberg with a recording that had been made there of his Piano Trio. Although he noted that Weinberg's speech was impeded by severe breathing problems and that he looked "very thin, very faint, like a shadow", Altskan said his face retained a youthful countenance.

==== Conversion to Christianity ====
In late November 1995, Weinberg discussed with his wife his interest in converting to Orthodox Christianity. His decision had been influenced from reading Joseph Brodsky's poem "Nunc Dimittis", whose depiction of Simeon Stylites the composer found moving. Weinberg was baptized in February 1996. A letter from Weinberg to Sviridov contains annotations from the latter that suggest the two composers may have discussed matters pertaining to the Orthodox Church in person or over the telephone in late 1988. In the same letter, Weinberg wrote of his concern over the "inevitability of losing one's physical shell" and of his music's "contact with spiritual, eternal values, without which a man is not a man".

Fanning believed that Weinberg converted under pressure from his wife, who was a Sunday school teacher of Jewish ancestry. Weinberg's first daughter, Viktoria, said in a 2016 interview that because of Weinberg's chronic illnesses, she doubted that his conversion had been voluntary. In her experience, Weinberg had "never engaged in pursuit of God and was not religious at all". Olga denied that Weinberg had been coerced into conversion. She replied that involuntary baptism is sinful and of no value, and that Weinberg had been considering his conversion for about a year before he asked to be baptized. In his monograph on Weinberg, the British musicologist Daniel Elphick said that Weinberg's conversion must be considered in context of the fact that there is no evidence that he ever practiced the Jewish faith:

Weinberg made extremely few statements about religion, but he evidently believed in God. His decision to convert was, according to [his daughter Anna], "made entirely in his right mind". Although his first daughter has attempted to question this, all signs point to the conclusion that Weinberg made this very personal decision when faced with his imminent death.

Gwizdalanka said that although Weinberg may not have been aware that anti-Semitism in the Orthodox Church exceeded that in Western Christianity, the message of death as freedom and the promise of eternity in Brodsky's poem had been decisive in his conversion. "[Weinberg] was not just baptized, but he was a profoundly devout, Orthodox man", according to Fedoseyev. "Nobody forced him to do anything, he did everything with conviction and of his own will".

=== Death ===
Weinberg died on February 26, 1996, in Moscow. Minutes before his death, Weinberg asked Olga to read to him from The Gospel. His last words were a request for "some water", after which he sipped, then died. After a small funeral service presided by Alexander Medvedev, the librettist of The Passenger, and Valentin Berlinsky, Weinberg was buried on March 1, 1996, at Domodedovo Cemetery.

== Personal character ==
=== Recollections ===
Weinberg's first wife, Natalya, mentioned him only twice in her memoirs. Viktoria, his first daughter, spoke at length about her father's character in a 2016 interview with the pianist Elisaveta Blumina. She said that her father avoided discussions about his past. The trauma Weinberg experienced, his daughter said, left enduring traits and habits. He was paranoid of continued anti-Semitic persecution, extremely fearful of being unpunctual, and greatly worried that his connections with people outside of the Soviet Union would draw official scrutiny. When Weinberg's former classmate, Małcużyński, requested to visit with him during a tour of the Soviet Union, the composer sought repeated reassurances from authorities that it was acceptable to meet with the pianist and invite him home. In general, Viktoria described Weinberg as being an unworldly person with a childish sense of helplessness at dealing with the world beyond music and that he constantly depended on the aid of family and friends. She also said that he was not an optimist by nature. "Given all the tragic twists in his destiny", she continued, "it was difficult for him to keep optimism and, maybe, even faith in God".

Olga, Weinberg's second wife, dismissed Viktoria's recollections, which she criticized as making the composer seem like a "mental defective, who sometimes appeared to be more like a psychopath or schizophrenic":

[Her] image of an idiot savant who is irresponsible for his own actions because he understood nothing outside of music reflects little of Weinberg's personality. A man who had financially supported his family since the age of 13, who beat out a living at the piano; a man who—while imprisoned was tortured by lack of sleep and the lights of nightsticks beamed into his eyes—never signed a single denunciation, must have known about personal responsibility. Closer to the essence of who he was are the words spoken about him in an article by his friend, the composer Lev Solin: "A mighty spirit in a fragile body".

Fedoseyev remembered Weinberg's "remarkable kindness" as a friend.

=== Work ethic ===
At home, family life was arranged entirely around Weinberg's work schedule, which began early in the morning daily. When compositions were completed, he would play them for his family and friends, often late into the night. According to Viktoria, Weinberg preferred to spend his time at home, rather than socializing. Music was the common bond between him and his closest friends. In letters to Olga, Weinberg declared that the act of composition was something he did not approach lightly. "[Composition] is an eternal conversation", he told her, "an eternal search for harmony between mankind and nature". He went on to declare his disdain for the ostentatious personal affectations cultivated by other artists. A true artist, according to him, must radiate their intrinsic quality and distinctiveness in everyday fellowship with his audience.

"He was quite strict as a professional", Fedoseyev recalled, but warm and humble to friends and colleagues:

Even on his deathbed, he managed to utter words that were crucial to me. In the very hushed voice of a dying man, he said: "Thank you, Vladimir Ivanovich". That was how he expressed his thanks to me for the fact that I always conducted many of his works. He was very courteous, always even-tempered with colleagues, but, unfortunately, they did not respond in kind, somehow did not notice it. I would even say—they crushed him. It is difficult for me to judge the reasons for such coldness. Envy perhaps?

The neglect of his music in later years personally disappointed Weinberg, but he made no effort to promote his own music and often lost interest in his works after he completed them.

=== Identification with Poland ===
"Poland is my homeland", Weinberg said after his visit to the country in 1966, "but my second homeland remains Russia". Nevertheless, the Polish language became for him a symbol of what was lost in his birthplace; he maintained his command of it and regularly read in the language. Meyer observed that Weinberg's Polish was perfect, formal, and bourgeois. Similarly, Mielcarek recalled Weinberg's reaction when asked whether he preferred to speak Polish before he received his honor in 1994:

It was as if he was waiting for that opportunity, as if he needed it. His Polish was beautiful, flawless, and typical of the prewar Polish intelligentsia. He spoke fluently with an extraordinary richness of vocabulary.

Afterwards, Weinberg talked about his frustration at having the realization of his musical ideas impeded by the decay of his body. When Mielcarek asked him how he coped, the composer replied: "Sir, fortunately there is still wonderful Polish music. Every day, I play Chopin's pieces in my mind and I also listen to Moniuszko's operas".

=== Political beliefs ===
Weinberg was a member of the CPSU. Alexander Tchaikovsky called him a "great patriot of the Soviet Union and Russia". Weinberg admonished detractors, whom he said did not understand wartime terrors and how his adopted homeland had saved his life. Throughout his life, Weinberg rejected suggestions that the official persecution endured by him or other composers, including Shostakovich, had been severe, and denied facts relating to these. "Evidently he had invested too much in his search for freedom to give up on it", wrote Fanning. Olga said in an essay published in 2023 that Weinberg's patriotism for the Soviet Union and Russia should not be misunderstood as an "imaginary love of Soviet officialdom".

== Music ==
=== Overview ===
Weinberg's work catalog consists of over 150 compositions designated with opus numbers, in addition to various incidental scores for feature films, cartoons, theatre, and the circus. His works include twenty-two symphonies, seventeen string quartets, nineteen instrumental sonatas, seven operas, four cantatas, four chamber symphonies, and more than one-hundred songs. Critical discourse about his music is mostly centered on his symphonies. Of all his works, the string quartets cover the widest span of his career, from 1937 to 1986. The composer used the genre to test ideas and stylistic motifs that he later developed in other compositions.

Weinberg's compositions from his youth in Poland consisted of a pair of mazurkas, the Three Pieces for violin and piano, and his String Quartet No. 1; the latter was dedicated to Turczyński. It was not until after he became a pupil of Zolotarev that Weinberg began to seriously pursue composition as a vocation. While resident in Minsk, Weinberg composed several works. These included his Piano Sonata No. 2; Acacias, his first song cycle, with texts by Julian Tuwim; and his Symphonic Poem. Weinberg said that Acacias was meant to be a distraction from wartime stresses. He dedicated it to an unnamed woman whom he may have been romantically interested in. The Symphonic Poem had initially been named the Chromatic Symphony. It was premiered on June 21, 1941, by the State Symphony Orchestra of the Byelorussian SSR conducted by Ilya Musin.

In Tashkent, Weinberg developed his skills and composed prolifically. Aside from the Violin Sonata No. 1, he composed the Piano Sonata No. 2, which was premiered in Moscow by Emil Gilels, whom he had met in Tashkent. Two pieces for string quartet, the "Aria" and "Capriccio", were also composed, but these remained unperformed during the composer's lifetime. In addition, he also composed his Children's Songs for voice and piano, based on texts by I. L. Peretz; they were the first of his compositions to be published.

Following Weinberg's move to Moscow in 1943, he no longer dealt with privation and successfully integrated into the city's musical culture. In the immediate postwar years, he added to his work catalog twenty-one compositions during these years—a total of approximately seven hours' worth of music. Many of them were quickly premiered after their completion. They were performed by Gilels, Maria Grinberg, Dmitri Tsyganov, and the Beethoven Quartet. Some of the most notable works Weinberg composed in this period include his Piano Quintet, Piano Trio, Symphony No. 2, and his String Quartets Nos. 3 – 6.

During the period immediately following his release from jail, Weinberg established a career that accommodated his personal goals with those of the state. By the end of the 1950s he began to reorient his energies back into concert music; a turn signaled in 1957 by the composition of the String Quartet No. 7, his first essay in the genre in eleven years. As his prosperity and visibility increased in the 1960s, so did his connections with the top Soviet musicians of the era. Along with longstanding friends like Kogan, who premiered the Violin Concerto, a new generation of musicians—including Rudolf Barshai, Timofei Dokschitzer, Mikhail Fichtenholz, Kirill Kondrashin, and Mstislav Rostropovich—incorporated his music into their repertoire. The "Allegretto" from Weinberg's String Quartet No. 7 became a favorite encore piece of the Borodin Quartet, while its successor, the String Quartet No. 8 from 1959, gained recognition in the West; for many years, it was the only one of the composer's quartets played in the West. Works which had long remained unperformed, such as the Symphony No. 2, were premiered and played in the Soviet Union and elsewhere within the Eastern Bloc.

Weinberg continued to be prolifically creative through the 1980s. Among the works he composed during this period were five symphonies, four solo sonatas, three song cycles, two chamber symphonies, two operas, two string quartets, an operetta, and a concerto. His output dropped as a consequence of chronic health problems and the collapse of the Soviet Union. Weinberg completed a few works in the 1990s, including the sketch score of his Symphony No. 22, his last. Worsening health prevented him from orchestrating it and from continuing any further composition after 1994. Elphick said that Weinberg's late music was both a product and reflection of the unraveling of Soviet society that occurred in the 1980s and 1990s. His final works, according to the British musicologist, "marked him out as something of a survivor, in terms of his main influences and his own musical language".

=== Themes ===
Childhood experiences and the trauma of World War II are recurring programmatic themes in Weinberg's music. His outlook as a composer was defined by personal humanism and opposition to fascism. His later music was motivated by his need to memorialize the violence of war, death of his family, and loss of Poland as homeland. Seven of Weinberg's compositions are dedicated to his family, of which four alone bear dedications to his mother; he commemorated the war in nine works, including the late symphonic trilogy, Having Crossed the Threshold of War. However, Weinberg adhered to the Soviet perception of World War II as a multinational tragedy to which no single group of peoples could claim having been exceptionally victimized. Therefore, his music neither explicitly commemorates the consequences that Jewish people experienced in the war nor the Holocaust in particular. His opera, The Passenger, while taking the Holocaust as its main subject, depicts prisoners from a wide range of nationalities and makes little specific mention of Jewish suffering.

=== Influences ===
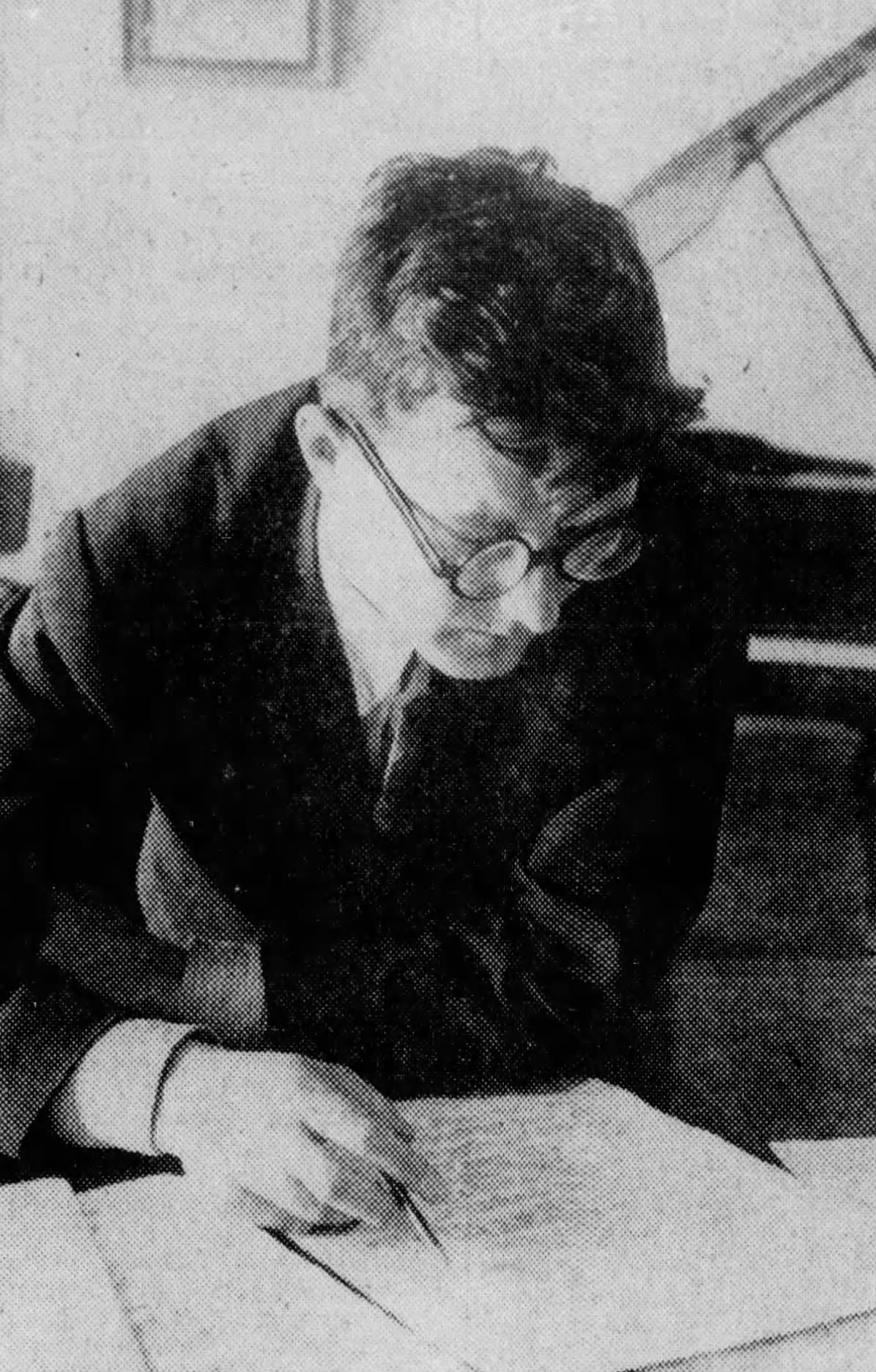
Weinberg described his first hearing of the music of Dmitri Shostakovich (pictured c. 1942) as being like "the discovery of a continent".

Little is known about the influences and musical activities Weinberg experienced as a composer in Poland. While resident in Minsk, Weinberg first heard the music of Dmitri Shostakovich, an experience he later described as being like "the discovery of a continent". This occurred during a performance by the State Symphony Orchestra of the Byelorussian SSR of Shostakovich's Symphony No. 5. Because the orchestra lacked a harp and celesta, Weinberg, who was the staff pianist, played both parts on the piano:

And so this was the first time I found out any music by [Shostakovich]... I understood that being just any composer was for more or less talented craftsmen, but a real composer was a reasoning and comprehending personality. I remember how, sitting and playing in the orchestra, I was amazed by every phrase, every musical idea, as if a thousand electrical charges were piercing me. Probably this is the feeling felt by everyone who at one time or another has felt the urge to exclaim "Eureka!"

Aside from the Three Fantastic Dances, Weinberg had little previous familiarity with Shostakovich's music, a fact he expressed regret for later in life. "Even today I feel aggrieved because I was deprived of his music in the strongest, freshest years of my youth", he said.

Fanning and Elphick wrote that Shostakovich, in turn, was also influenced by Weinberg, particularly in his early string quartets. When the composer Grigory Frid pointed out this mutual influence to Weinberg, the latter dismissed it. "What are you, crazy?", Weinberg replied.

Sergei Prokofiev was another important influence on Weinberg's music, as were Béla Bartók, Paul Hindemith, Gustav Mahler, and Myaskovsky. Nikitina noted that Weinberg adopted from Mahler a desire to express through music a perception of reality that was profound and tragic. She said that the composer's programmatic attitudes to composition and what she described as the pantheistic outlook of works such as the Sixth and Eighth symphonies best exemplified the connection between the two composers. Weinberg's chamber music also evinces the influence of Alexander Borodin, Sergei Rachmaninoff, Nikolai Rimsky-Korsakov, and Pyotr Ilyich Tchaikovsky. His music also contains elements of traditional Polish, Russian, and Jewish music. Deliberate choice and circumstances beyond Weinberg's control led him to be influenced by the Polish and Soviet avant-garde in his late music.

According to Nikitina, the decisive event in Weinberg's career was his move to the Soviet Union, where he matured as a composer. As a result, she said, his work was "inextricably bound with Soviet artistic and quotidian life" and is stylistically interlinked with the music of his compatriot contemporaries.

=== Reception ===
==== In the Soviet Union and Russia ====
Weinberg's music was generally received positively in his early years in the Soviet Union, but it faced insinuations about its perceived derivativeness and dependence on wartime imagery. Postwar music critics, particularly Daniel Zhitomirsky, wrote about Weinberg's music more favorably. His Piano Quintet was nominated for a Stalin Prize in 1945. The work was denied a prize because one of the jury members, the architect Arkady Mordvinov, objected to the work's use of pizzicato, a common string technique that he was unfamiliar with. His rebuke of the work was also interpreted as a proxy attack against Shostakovich. In the event, Weinberg's friend, Georgy Sviridov, ultimately won the first class prize in the chamber music category with his Piano Trio. In 1952, Shostakovich nominated Weinberg's Rhapsody on Moldavian Themes for a Stalin Prize, but it lost. Weinberg was one of the few major Soviet composers of the 1940s and early 1950s who neither won a Stalin Prize nor whose nominations ever progressed beyond the first round of voting.

The "stellar years" of the 1960s generated most of the Russian publications about Weinberg during his lifetime. The reception of his instrumental music proceeded largely without negative commentary. Mixed reactions and hostility from colleagues met his vocal music, however, such as his Symphony No. 6. A work that the musicologist Lyudmila Nikitina said is structured "akin to a dramatic monologue", it is the first of his six vocal symphonies, and consists of settings of texts by Leib Kvitko, Shmuel Halkin, and Mikhail Lukonin; all of whom were considered to be politically suspect by authorities. After its premiere on November 12, 1963, Dmitry Kabalevsky confided his intense dislike of the work to Karen Khachaturian and Rodion Shchedrin. The details of his criticism were relayed to Weinberg. Later, at a meeting of the Ministry of Culture, the musicologist Boris Yarustovsky attacked the symphony for being what he called a "ballad of dead children". Their opposition resulted in the cancellation of an article about the symphony that had been scheduled for a forthcoming issue of Sovyetskaya Kultura. Weinberg was later personally confronted about the symphony by Kabalevsky, who related to him that he was "immensely despondent and aghast at [its] extraordinary failure". When pressed about why the symphony was "hopeless, sad, and even demoralizing", Weinberg responded that his symphony was nothing of the kind. "The whole point of the symphony", he told Kabalevsky, "was about the struggle against the most terrible evil of all—war—and that the Soviet people, who had suffered from fascism the most, would never permit war and, therefore, could sleep in peace".

In 1976, Weinberg composed his Symphony No. 12 in Shostakovich's memory and asked Kondrashin to conduct its premiere. The conductor had previously balked at Weinberg's vocal symphonies. When he was offered the Symphony No. 12, he accused the composer of having become "arid, variable in quality, and expressionless" since his Symphony No. 8. He stipulated that he would only conduct the new symphony contingent on extensive cuts to the score to be approved by him. Exasperated by Kondrashin's behavior, Weinberg terminated his friendship with him. Another friendship that ended was with Rostropovich, for whom the 24 Preludes for solo cello had been intended. By the time of its composition in 1968, his relationship with Weinberg worsened to the point that he never performed the work, despite having edited it for publication. Weinberg said near the end of his life that Rostropovich had become "too busy" to play his music. Rostropovich, on the other hand, said little other than calling Weinberg "a coward". Other performers who regularly played Weinberg's music, like Barshai, had emigrated.

According to Alexander Tchaikovsky, Weinberg's rapid marginalization from the mainstream of Soviet music in the 1980s was the by-product of increased interest in avant-gardists of the time such as Alfred Schnittke, Sofia Gubaidulina, and Edison Denisov that had occurred because of glasnost and perestroika. "Weinberg somehow [did] not exist for Soviet music", Tchaikovsky said. Many of Weinberg's friends and colleagues had also died or left the Soviet Union. Because Weinberg never taught, he was unable to benefit from the help of a network of colleagues and students.

Weinberg's 75th birthday in 1994 elicited no response from the Russian government and various musical organizations. The 80th anniversary of his birth in 1999, however, was commemorated with six concerts that programmed twenty-four of his chamber works and was followed by a symposium. Interest in Weinberg's music within Russia has increased in the 21st century, but not to the same degree as in the West.
