= CNN opera =

A CNN opera is a contemporary opera taking news events as a theme or a classical opera transposed to a contemporary setting. The somewhat deprecatory term CNN opera alludes to Cable News Network, CNN.

Operas that have been referred to as a CNN opera include:

- Nixon in China by John Adams
- The Death of Klinghoffer, also by John Adams
- X, The Life and Times of Malcolm X by Anthony Davis
- Harvey Milk, composed by Stewart Wallace, libretto by Michael Korie

Perhaps because of his association with Adams and a record of modern transpositions, some of the output of director Peter Sellars has also been referred to as CNN opera.
