= The Bricklayer (disambiguation) =

The Bricklayer is a 2024 American action film.

The Bricklayer or The Bricklayers may also refer to:

- The Bricklayers (1905 film), a French silent film
- El albañil (English: The Bricklayer), a 1975 Mexican comedy film
- The Bricklayers, a 1976 Mexican drama
- The Bricklayer, a 2012 opera by Farnoosh Moshiri and Gregory Spears

== See also ==
- Bricklayer
