= Harvey Milk (opera) =

Opera by Stewart Wallace

- Opera by Stewart Wallace
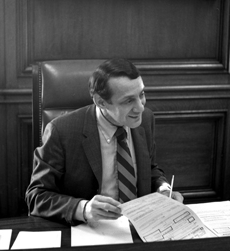
- The opera's protagonist, gay activist and politician Harvey Milk, photographed in 1978
- Librettist: Michael Korie
- Premiere: January 21, 1995; Houston Grand Opera

Harvey Milk is an American opera with music by Stewart Wallace and libretto by Michael Korie, based on the life and death of the American gay activist and politician Harvey Milk, who was assassinated along with San Francisco mayor George Moscone on 27 November 1978. The opera was originally in 3 acts, and was a joint commission by Houston Grand Opera, New York City Opera, and San Francisco Opera, and received its premiere on 21 January 1995 by Houston Grand Opera. A revised version in 2 acts received its premiere on 11 June 2022 by Opera Theatre of Saint Louis.

== Background and performance history ==
John Dew originally suggested the idea for a stage work based on the life of Harvey Milk to David Gockley, then the general director of Houston Grand Opera. Gockley then approached Stewart Wallace and Michael Korie, who had been looking for a new opera subject, after their previous collaborations on the dance opera Kabbalah and the two-act opera Where's Dick?. The latter had its world premiere at Houston Grand Opera in 1989. According to Gockley, Dew's original conception to stage the work as a musical was:

...very, very weird, with strange dreamlike drag ballets and the like. He had a distorted idea of the subject.

The artistic relationship with Dew subsequently deteriorated in 1992 when Dew went to Houston to direct the premiere of Robert Moran's opera, Desert of Roses. When both the opera company and Wallace found Dew's concept unacceptable, Harvey Milk took form as an opera instead. Houston Grand Opera, New York City Opera, and San Francisco Opera jointly shared in the commission of the opera. The work premiered on January 21, 1995 in Houston. Christopher Alden was the director, with set designs by Paul Steinberg, choreography by Ross A. Perry, and fight direction by Michael Kirkland.

New York City Opera then presented the opera with the same cast in April 1995. Both the composer and librettist considered the New York premiere "a debacle". The conductor, Christopher Keene, was ill with AIDS during much of the rehearsal period. According to Korie:

Christopher was very committed to this, but my hair went gray. The chorus never learned the music. The stage manager was never around.

John Dew produced the German premiere of the opera at the Opernhaus Dortmund in February 1996. The Dortmund production used a German translation and a completely different staging devised by Dew.

Wallace and Korie revised the opera for the San Francisco Opera performances, in collaboration with Donald Runnicles, music director of the company, and Peter Grunberg, a vocal coach with the company. Wallace tightened the score, and simplified the orchestration and the rhythmic notation, with a reduction in the opera's running time from nearly three hours to just over two. The changes to the libretto included reduction of the role of Dan White and of the final act, and the addition of two new arias for Harvey Milk. San Francisco Opera premiered the revised version, then considered the definitive edition, at the Orpheum Theatre on 9 November 1996 and ran for eight performances. The principal roles were sung by the original Houston cast, apart from the role of Milk's mother which was sung by Elizabeth Bishop. In the Houston production, Juliana Gondek had sung both that role and the role of Dianne Feinstein. The November 27 performance was timed to coincide with the 18th annual candlelight march through the city's Castro District commemorating the day that Moscone and Milk were assassinated. The march ended in front of the Orpheum Theatre, and several of Milk's friends and associates appeared in the opera's Act 2 parade scene. The première San Francisco production of 1996 was recorded in November and later released on Teldec Records.

For a scheduled 2020 revival of the opera in commemoration of the 90th anniversary of Harvey Milk's birth, Opera Parallèle collaborated with Wallace and Korie on a new two-act version of the opera, scaled to allow smaller companies to present the opera. The COVID-19 pandemic caused the postponement of this scheduled production. The revised 2-act version received its premiere at Opera Theatre of Saint Louis on 11 June 2022.

== Roles ==
Roles, voice types, premiere cast
Original 3-act version			Revised 2-act version
Role	Voice type	Premiere cast, 21 January 1995 Houston Grand Opera Conductor: Ward Holmquist	Premiere cast, 11 June 2022 Opera Theatre of Saint Louis Conductor: Carolyn Kuan
Harvey Milk, gay activist and member of the San Francisco Board of Supervisors	baritone	Robert Orth	Thomas Glass
Dan White, member of the San Francisco Board of Supervisors and Milk's assassin	tenor	Raymond Very	Alek Shrader
George Moscone, Mayor of San Francisco	bass	Gidon Saks	Nathan Stark
Dianne Feinstein, member of the San Francisco Board of Supervisors	mezzo-soprano or soprano	Juliana Gondek	Raquel González
Scott Smith, Milk's lover	tenor	Bradley Williams	Jonathan Johnson
Henry Wong (countertenor) / Henrietta Wong (soprano), Milk's associate		Randall Wong (countertenor)	Xiao Xiao (mezzo-soprano)
Messenger		James Maddalena (baritone)	Kyle Sanchez Tingzon (countertenor)
Anne Kronenberg, Milk's campaign manager	mezzo-soprano	Jill Grove	Mack Wolz
Medora Payne, 11-year old supporter of Milk	child soprano	Lilly Akseth	(omitted)
Harvey Milk as a boy		Matthew Cavenaugh (boy soprano)	Mishael Eusebio (tenor)
Harvey Milk's mother ('Mama')	mezzo-soprano or soprano	Juliana Gondek	Elizabeth Sarian
Concentration camp inmates, San Francisco supervisors, men at the opera, closet lovers, reporters, people of San Francisco

In addition to the ten principal roles, the opera has over 70 smaller singing roles. Except for the singer of the title role, the principal cast members also sang multiple smaller roles.

The revised version eliminates several roles, such as Medora Payne, and uses smaller instrumentation and generally smaller musical forces compared to the 3-act version.

== Orchestration ==
2(both pic).2(2.ca).2(2.Ebcl).bcl(cl).2(2.cbsn)-4.3.3.2-timp.3perc(glsp, xyl, vib, mar, cimbalom, tub bells, tri, sus cym, cym (pair), h.h, agogo bells, cow bell, tam-t, s.d, 4tom-t, timb, anvil, wdbl, pic wdbl, tempbl, police whistle, samba whistle, sirene)-keybd-str(16-18 vn, 8 vc, 5 db)

== Recording ==
- Wallace: Harvey Milk – Robert Orth (Harvey Milk), Raymond Very (Dan White), Gidon Saks (George Moscone), Elizabeth Bishop (Mama), Juliana Gondek (Dianne Feinstein), Bradley Williams (Scott Smith), James Maddalena (Messenger), Randall Wong (Henry Wong); San Francisco Opera Orchestra and Chorus; Donald Runnicles (conductor). Recorded at Davies Symphony Hall, San Francisco, November 1996; released July 1998. Label: Teldec. OCLC 38981451

== See also ==
- Fellow Travelers (opera)
- Patience and Sarah (opera)
