= Keith Barbour =

American singer-songwriter

- Born: January 21, 1941 (age 84); New York City, New York, U.S.
- Genres: Pop
- Labels: Epic Records

Keith Barbour (born January 21, 1941) is an American singer-songwriter and actor who was a member of the Jabberwocks and New Christy Minstrels.

== Career ==
He was a member of the Jabberwocks, Brown University's oldest male a cappella group, while in college. He was later a member of the New Christy Minstrels before signing to Epic Records as a solo artist in 1969. He released an album, Echo Park, in 1969, which hit No. 163 on the Billboard 200, and the title track, written by Buzz Clifford, hit No. 40 on the Pop Singles chart. He had a follow-up single, "My God and I" in November 1970.

== Personal life ==
Barbour was married to TV soap actress Deidre Hall from 1971 to 1978.

== Filmography ==
=== Television ===
Year	Title	Role	Notes
1974	McCloud	Chip	Episode: "The Barefoot Girls of Bleecker Street"
1979–1980	The Plastic Man Comedy/Adventure Show	Additional voices	16 episodes
1982	The Fall Guy	Piano Player	Episode: "No Way Out"
1982	Terror at Alcatraz	Morty	Television film
1989	Chameleons	Van Cop	Television film
