= Michael Korie =

American librettist and lyricist

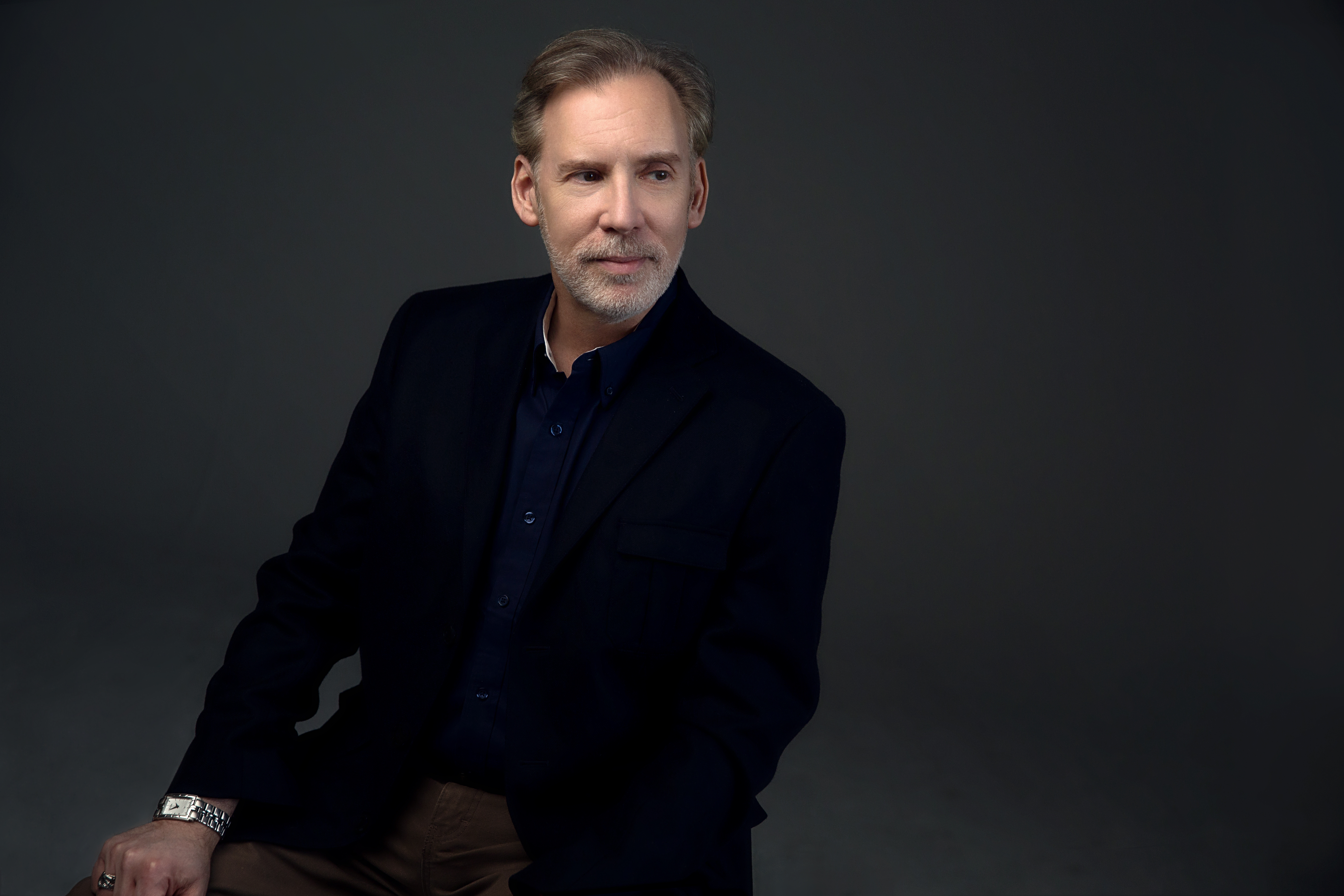
- Korie in 2015
- Born: April 1, 1955 (age 71); Elizabeth, New Jersey, U.S.
- Education: Brandeis University; New York University
- Occupations: Librettist; lyricist
- Website: michaelkorie.com

Michael Korie (born April 1, 1955) is an American librettist and lyricist whose writing for musical theater and opera includes the musicals Grey Gardens and Far From Heaven, and the operas Harvey Milk and The Grapes of Wrath. His works have been produced on Broadway, Off-Broadway, and internationally. His lyrics have been nominated for the Tony Award and the Drama Desk Award, and won the Outer Critics Circle Award. In 2016, Korie was awarded the Marc Blitzstein Award from the American Academy of Arts and Letters.

== Biography ==
Korie was born in Elizabeth, New Jersey, the son of Benjamin and Janet Indick. His father, a pharmacist, published scholarly essays on H. P. Lovecraft and Stephen King. His mother is a sculptor and President Emeritus of the National Association of Women Artists. Raised in Teaneck, New Jersey, he graduated from Teaneck High School in 1973. Korie studied music at Brandeis University before transferring to the journalism department of New York University. In the mid-1970s he worked as a journalist, freelancing and editing for The Village Voice and other Manhattan weeklies. His background in reporting informed several works he was to write based on non-fiction figures in the news.

== Operas and musicals ==
=== Where's Dick? ===
The first work of Korie's to receive major attention was a "new-vaudeville" crossover opera called Where's Dick?, composed by Stewart Wallace and developed at Playwrights Horizons. A satire that transformed current events into a comic book world of villainy, the opera featured characters including the “midget master builder” Stump Tower, based on Donald Trump, and the twin Tarnish Brothers: Sterling and Stainless, inspired by William and Lamar Hunt's attempts to corner the world silver market. It premiered at the Miller Outdoor Theater in 1989 in a production mounted by the Houston Grand Opera and directed by Richard Foreman. Writing in The New York Times, critic Bernard Holland called it "the type of musical stage work…we ought to be pursuing". The Village Voice’s Leighton Kerner described it as "a grisly comic indictment, both grotesque and sublime".

=== Kabbalah ===
Korie's next collaboration with Wallace was Kabbalah, conceived in seven musical sections or “gates” according to Kabbalistic philosophy. The work's libretto is written entirely in archaic languages, including Medieval French and German, early Spanish, and Aramaic, in order to trace the growth of Kabbalistic practice through the Jewish Diaspora. Recordings of interviews he conducted while in residence among orthodox Kabbalistic communities in Jerusalem were mixed into live performances during the work's 1989 premiere, co-produced by the Brooklyn Academy of Music’s Next Wave Festival and Dance Theater Workshop, with direction and choreography by Ann Carlson. John Rockwell in The New York Times said of it, "Kabbalah may prove ultimately more important for what it promises than for what it provides. But even what it provides has its real merits."

=== Harvey Milk ===
Korie’s next collaboration with Stewart Wallace was the opera Harvey Milk, conceived as an epic opera in three acts and co-commissioned by Houston Grand Opera, New York City Opera, and San Francisco Opera. It depicts the life of the slain politician and gay-rights activist Harvey Milk. The first act (“The Closet”) represents Milk's early years as a closeted stock broker in New York, his arrest in central park, and his decision to depart for San Francisco with his lover Scott Smith in the wake of the Stonewall Rebellion. The second act (“The Castro”) charts Milk's transformation from a San Francisco camera store owner to an elected City Supervisor. The Third Act (“City Hall”) dramatizes his hardball-style politicking and head-butting with his assassin, fellow Supervisor Dan White. Milk's premonition of his death is shown in the aria “If a Bullet Should Enter My Brain...,” as he makes a tape recording of his last will just weeks before his murder by White.

The opera premiered on January 21, 1995, at the Houston Grand Opera and generated controversy over the first presentation of openly gay love scenes on the operatic stage. The Chicago Tribune called it "one of the best new operas in years" and The Independent’s Edward Seckerson wrote "the libretto is among the sharpest in contemporary opera". K. Robert Schwartz in The New York Times wrote “Harvey Milk is an unflinching in-your-face kind of opera, a work that examines not only Milk’s tragedy but the awakening of gay consciousness in America.”

Performances followed at New York City Opera and San Francisco Opera. Joshua Kosman in The San Francisco Chronicle wrote of the SFO production, “By turns haunting and hilarious, brassy and mystically poetic, the libretto is a magnificent creation.” The opera was recorded by Teldec in 1998, with Donald Runnicles conducting.

A concert work for soloists, chorus and orchestra, Kaddish for Harvey Milk, was reworked by the composer from forty-five minutes of text and music extracted from the opera's third act requiem before its premiere. The work was presented in London as part of the Maida Vale Concerts series in 2002, performed by the BBC Symphony. In February 2015, a new semi-staged concert version drawn from the entire opera was presented in Melbourne, Australia, directed by Cameron Lukie, and again in Sydney in 2016.

=== Hopper’s Wife ===
Wallace and Korie's next opera, the three-character ninety-minute Hopper's Wife, imagines Josephine Hopper, wife of painter Edward Hopper, transformed into the gossip columnist Hedda Hopper. Of its premiere at Long Beach Opera in 1997, music critic Mark Swed wrote in The Los Angeles Times, "Korie offers exciting images and horribly crude ones side by side; clever rhymes intentionally confuse smut with art. Brave, bold and important." Art in America said that the production "made a case for opera as a genuinely adult art form able to confront and decry the current 'dumbed-down' state of American culture." In 2016, the newly revived New York City Opera selected the opera for its inaugural season, producing the work's East Coast premiere at Harlem Stage in a production conducted by James Lowe and directed by Andreas Mitisek.

=== Doll ===
Concurrent with his work in opera, Korie began a collaboration in musical theater with composer Scott Frankel. Their first work, Doll, dramatized painter Oscar Kokoschka's fetishistic love for a life-sized, functioning doll modeled after Gustav Mahler's widow Alma Mahler. Doll was awarded the Richard Rogers Development Award in 1994. It was developed at the Sundance Musical Theater Lab, and was staged in 2003 at Chicago's Ravinia Festival, directed by Lonny Price, with a cast featuring Michael Cerveris and David Hyde Pierce.

=== Grey Gardens ===
The team's best-known work, Grey Gardens, is the first musical to have been based on a documentary—the Albert and David Maysles documentary of the same name. With a book by playwright Doug Wright, Grey Gardens expanded upon the period documented in the film — Little Edie and Big Edie Beale living in a crumbling and decrepit mansion in East Hampton — by adding a hypothesized first act which imagined the engagement reception of Little Edie and Joseph Kennedy Jr., at the mansion in its heyday thirty years before. Of making a musical out of a documentary, Korie was quoted as saying, “unlike in a movie, in the theater there are no close-ups. Music and lyrics provide an actor with the equivalent of a close-up on the screen, a defining gesture that stops time and glimpses momentarily into the soul.”

Grey Gardens opened on February 10, 2006, at Playwrights Horizons with direction by Michael Greif and a cast featuring Christine Ebersole, Mary Louise Wilson, and John McMartin, later transferring to Broadway. The musical won an Outer Critics Circle Award for Outstanding Musical, was nominated for ten Tony Awards (including Best Musical), and was cited as Time Magazine’s #1 New Show of the Year for 2006-2007. In his essays on the show in The Best Plays Theater Yearbook, 2006-2007, Michael Feingold characterizes Korie’s lyrics as "...couched in a diction that shifts recklessly from high to low and past to present...Grey Gardens’s lyrics convey an eccentric sensibility wholly their own, mirroring the two heroines’ eccentricity." Since its premiere, Grey Gardens has received numerous productions both in the U.S. and abroad in Japan, Brazil, and Australia. The New York Times cited the song "Another Winter in a Summer Town" as one that should be included in the standard American musical theater repertoire. The original Broadway cast recording was released by PS Classics in 2007.

In the summer of 2015, the work made its East Hampton Premiere at the Bay Street Theater, directed by Michael Wilson. Starring Rachel York and Betty Buckley, the production was subsequently presented by the Center Theatre Group at Los Angeles' Ahmanson Theatre in the summer of 2016. Also in 2016, the musical had its European premiere at London's Southwark Playhouse, starring Olivier award-winning actresses Sheila Hancock and Jenna Russell, and directed by Thom Southerland. Writing for theartsdesk.com, Matt Wolf commented that “the portrait of a party gone spectacularly sour works very well in its own right and allows in practical terms for Russell to dazzle as both mother in act one and her own daughter in act two– a gift of a dual assignment that Russell bats out of the park....Grey Gardens' singular achievement is to seem absolutely and bracingly unique.” The production received the 2017 Offie for “Best Musical of the Year”.

=== The Grapes of Wrath ===
Korie's next opera libretto was an adaptation of John Steinbeck's Grapes of Wrath with a score by Ricky Ian Gordon. Minnesota Opera's world premiere production opened in 2007 to highly favorable notices. Writing for The New Yorker, Alex Ross praised Korie for the libretto's “teeth,” marveling that he “found ways to leave [the novel’s] rage intact even as he gives lyric voice to the suffering Joad clan”, and The Los Angeles Times praised the “strong, literate libretto” for finding “the timeless and timely essence of Steinbeck’s epic.” It was subsequently produced at Utah Opera and Pittsburgh Opera.

Grapes of Wrath was performed in an abridged concert version at Carnegie Hall on March 22, 2010. Ted Sperling conducted the American Symphony Orchestra, MasterVoices (formerly the Collegiate Chorale), and soloists from both Broadway and opera including Victoria Clark, Christine Ebersole, Elizabeth Futral, Steven Pasquale, and Nathan Gunn in the lead roles. Jane Fonda (whose father Henry Fonda played Tom Joad in the 1940 film adaptation of the novel) narrated. A reconceived and restructured version of the full opera, in two acts instead of three, will premiere in May, 2017 in a new production at the Opera Theatre of Saint Louis. It will be directed by James Robinson.

=== Happiness ===
Korie and Frankel's next score was the musical Happiness, with a book by John Weidman, and direction and choreography by Susan Stroman. Happiness premiered Off-Broadway at Lincoln Center’s Mitzi Newhouse Theater on February 27, 2009, produced by Lincoln Center Theater. Its metaphysical premise of passengers on a New York City subway car trapped in purgatory was received negatively by New York Times theater critic Ben Brantley, who wrote that the score featured "loud but misty ballads in which people hold notes for a long time." One positive notice was by John Simon for Bloomberg.com, who called the work "110 minutes of flawless, nonstop entertainment".

=== Far From Heaven ===
Far From Heaven was the team's next musical, based on the Todd Haynes film of the same name and adapted for the stage by playwright Richard Greenberg. The musical had a preview engagement at the Williamstown Theatre Festival in July 2012. It was produced Off-Broadway at Playwrights Horizons in 2013, starring Kelli O'Hara and Steven Pasquale. Terry Teachout in The Wall Street Journal deemed it "vastly superior to the film on which it is based." In his essay for the P.S. Classics original cast recording, New York Magazine theater critic Jesse Green wrote “The singular achievement of Far From Heaven is to have turned so much seriousness—so much fury and pain—into so much songwriting beauty.”

=== Doctor Zhivago ===
Korie co-wrote lyrics with Amy Powers to the stage musical Doctor Zhivago, with music by Lucy Simon, book by playwright Michael Weller (based on Boris Pasternak’s novel), and direction by Des McAnuff. The work's lengthy development began at the La Jolla Playhouse in 2006. A rewritten production opened with success in Sydney, Australia in 2011. It was subsequently presented in Norway, Sweden, and South Korea, before opening on Broadway in April 2015 at the Broadway Theatre, again directed by McAnuff, and starring Tam Mutu in the title role. It closed after 26 previews and 23 regular performances. A cast recording was released by Broadway Records. During 2016–2017 it played at The National Theater of Hungary.

=== War Paint ===
Korie and Frankel reunited with playwright Doug Wright and director Michael Greif for the musical War Paint. The musical centers on the decades-long rivalry for supremacy in the cosmetics industry between beauty titans Helena Rubinstein and Elizabeth Arden. It premiered at Chicago's Goodman Theatre in June 2016, in a production starring Patti LuPone as Rubinstein, and Christine Ebersole as Arden.

=== The Garden of the Finzi-Continis ===
Korie wrote the libretto for Ricky Ian Gordon's operatic adaptation of The Garden of the Finzi-Continis, which begins on the eve of World War II and tells the story of an aristocratic Italian-Jewish family, the Finzi-Continis, who believe they are immune to the changes happening around them. It premiered in January 2022 in co-production with the National Yiddish Theatre Folksbiene and the New York City Opera.

== Awards ==
MacDowell Fellowship

== Publications and recordings ==
- Grey Gardens (Libretto and Lyrics), Applause Books, August 2007.
- Grey Gardens (Folio & Score), Williamson Music, July 2007.
- Grey Gardens: Original Broadway Cast Recording, PS Classics, 2007.
- Grey Gardens: Original Off-Broadway Cast Recording, PS Classics, 2006.
- The Grapes of Wrath, Minnesota Opera Original Cast Recording (2008).
- The Grapes of Wrath (Libretto and Score), Carl Fischer/Theodore Presser Publications, 2009.
- The Grapes of Wrath Solo Aria Collection - 16 Aria Excerpts from the Opera The Grapes of Wrath', Carl Fischer/Theodore Presser Publications, 2010.
- Harvey Milk, San Francisco Opera & Symphony, Cond.: Donald Runnicles, Teldec Classics/Warner, 2000.
- Gay Century Songbook Carnegie Hall Premiere, NYCGM Chorus & Orchestra, DRG Label, 2002
- Kabbalah, Cond.: Michael Barrett, Koch Classics, 1990.
- Far From Heaven: Original Broadway Cast Recording, PS Classics, 2013.
- Far From Heaven (Score), Imagen/Rodgers and Hammerstein, 2015.
