= David Gockley =

American opera company administrator (born 1943)

David Gockley (born July 13, 1943, Philadelphia, Pennsylvania) is an American opera company administrator. He served as general director of Houston Grand Opera from 1972 to 2005 and San Francisco Opera from 2006 to 2016. He was a student of Margaret Harshaw.

== Biography ==
Richard David Gockley was born in Philadelphia and grew up in Wayne, Pennsylvania. He holds a bachelor's degree from Brown University, where he sang with the Jabberwocks, and a master's degree from Columbia University. According to San Francisco Opera's website, his father was an athletic coach and inspired his early love for sports, and he inherited a passion for music from his mother. He is the father of three children: Meredith, Lauren, and Adam.

He has served as president of the board of OPERA America and is currently a board member.

== Houston Grand Opera ==
In 1970, Gockley joined Houston Grand Opera as business manager and was appointed general director in 1972. Under his tenure, Houston Grand Opera presented 35 world premieres and six American premieres. Gockley oversaw the founding of the Houston Grand Opera Studio in 1977, the company's young artist development program, and the opening of the Wortham Theater Center in 1987. He introduced “plazacasts”, free broadcasts of mainstage opera productions to outdoor audiences; created OperaVision, a series of screens located throughout the Wortham Center that projected close-up shots of the action on stage; and began annual radio broadcasts of Houston Grand Opera performances in the U.S. and abroad.

After a 33-year tenure as general director, Gockley resigned from Houston Grand Opera in 2005 to assume the post of general director for San Francisco Opera.

== San Francisco Opera ==
Gockley became San Francisco Opera's sixth general director on January 1, 2006. Under Gockley's leadership, San Francisco Opera (SFO) has presented the world premieres of Appomattox by Philip Glass and Christopher Hampton in 2007; The Bonesetter's Daughter by Stewart Wallace and Amy Tan in 2008; and Christopher Theofanidis and Donna Di Novelli's Heart of a Soldier in 2011.

The company also presented the West Coast premieres of Rachel Portman's The Little Prince and Jake Heggie's chamber opera Three Decembers. San Francisco Opera also presented three world premieres in 2013: Nolan Gasser and Carey Harrison’s The Secret Garden, based on the children's book by Frances Hodgson Burnett in conjunction with UC Berkeley's Cal Performances; Mark Adamo’s The Gospel of Mary Magdalene; and Tobias Picker and J.D. McClatchy’s Dolores Claiborne, based on the novel by Stephen King. San Francisco Opera will present the world premieres of La Ciociara by Marco Tutino and Luca Rossi in the summer of 2015, based on novel of the same name by Alberto Moravia, and Dream of the Red Chamber by Bright Sheng and David Henry Hwang in fall 2016, based on the work of the same name by 18th-century Qing dynasty writer Cao Xueqin.

Gockley oversaw the creation of San Francisco Opera's Koret-Taube Media Suite, the first permanent high-definition broadcast-standard video production facility installed in any American opera house according to the company's website. Through the Koret-Taube Media Suite, he expanded on the plazacasts he pioneered at Houston Grand Opera with a series of “simulcasts”, live broadcasts of San Francisco Opera mainstage performances to remote locations. The company has presented eight simulcasts throughout San Francisco and the Bay Area, specifically to San Francisco's Civic Center Plaza, Stanford University's Frost Amphitheater, and seven simulcasts presented on the scoreboard at San Francisco's AT&T Park, home of the San Francisco Giants. All simulcasts have been presented free to the public, drawing as many as 200,000 people collectively. San Francisco Opera also broadcast a live performance of Don Giovanni to four theaters across Northern California in June 2007.

Gockley continued his OperaVision program at San Francisco Opera and supervised the presentation of four San Francisco Opera productions in movie theaters across the United States. Unlike the Metropolitan Opera, which began live broadcasts of performances to theaters in 2006 using projection systems used for advertising, The opera partnered with The Bigger Picture to present four operas in a feature–film quality digital cinema format in 2008.

In 2007, the opera returned to national and international radio after 25 years under Gockley's leadership. Earlier in 2007, Gockley announced the appointment of Italian conductor Nicola Luisotti as the company's new music director, effective September 2009. Luisotti is the company's third music director following Sir John Pritchard and Donald Runnicles. In January 2009, Gockley announced the reappointment of Patrick Summers as principal guest conductor and named Giuseppe Finzi as the company's new assistant music director. In May 2011, it was announced that Gockley's contract was to be extended through SFO's 2015–16 season.

Gockley announced his retirement in 2014 and transferred leadership to Matthew Shilvock in August 2016.

== Awards and honors ==
- Dean's Award for “Distinguished Professional Achievement”, Columbia University Business School
- Honorary Doctorate in Humane Letters, University of Houston, 1992
- Honorary Doctorate in Fine Arts, Brown University, 1993
- William Rogers Award, Brown University, 1995

== Sources ==
- Cummings, David, International Who's Who in Music and Musicians' Directory, Cambridge, England: Routledge; 17 edition June 13, 2000; ISBN 978-0-948875-53-3
