= Jabberwocks =

American university a cappella group

The Jabberwocks

Background information
- Origin: Brown University, Providence, Rhode Island, United States
- Genre: Collegiate a cappella
- Years active: 1949–present
- Members: Bridget Lim '26; Anish Dharam '27; Hazel Yekplé '27; Jack Bachman '27; Jamie Nguyen '27; Maddalena Honablue '27; Will Grossman '27; Anay Agarwal '28; Audrey Sanger '28; Belen Sanchez Mathews '28; Ryan Sweeney '28; Surya Gopal '28; Yumin Lee '28; Audrey Lin '29; Andres Cardenal '29; Avinav Cariens '29; Guthrie Clark '29; Jocelyn Pica '29; Rhea Ng '29
- Website: Official Site

The Jabberwocks is the oldest a cappella group at Brown University.

== History ==
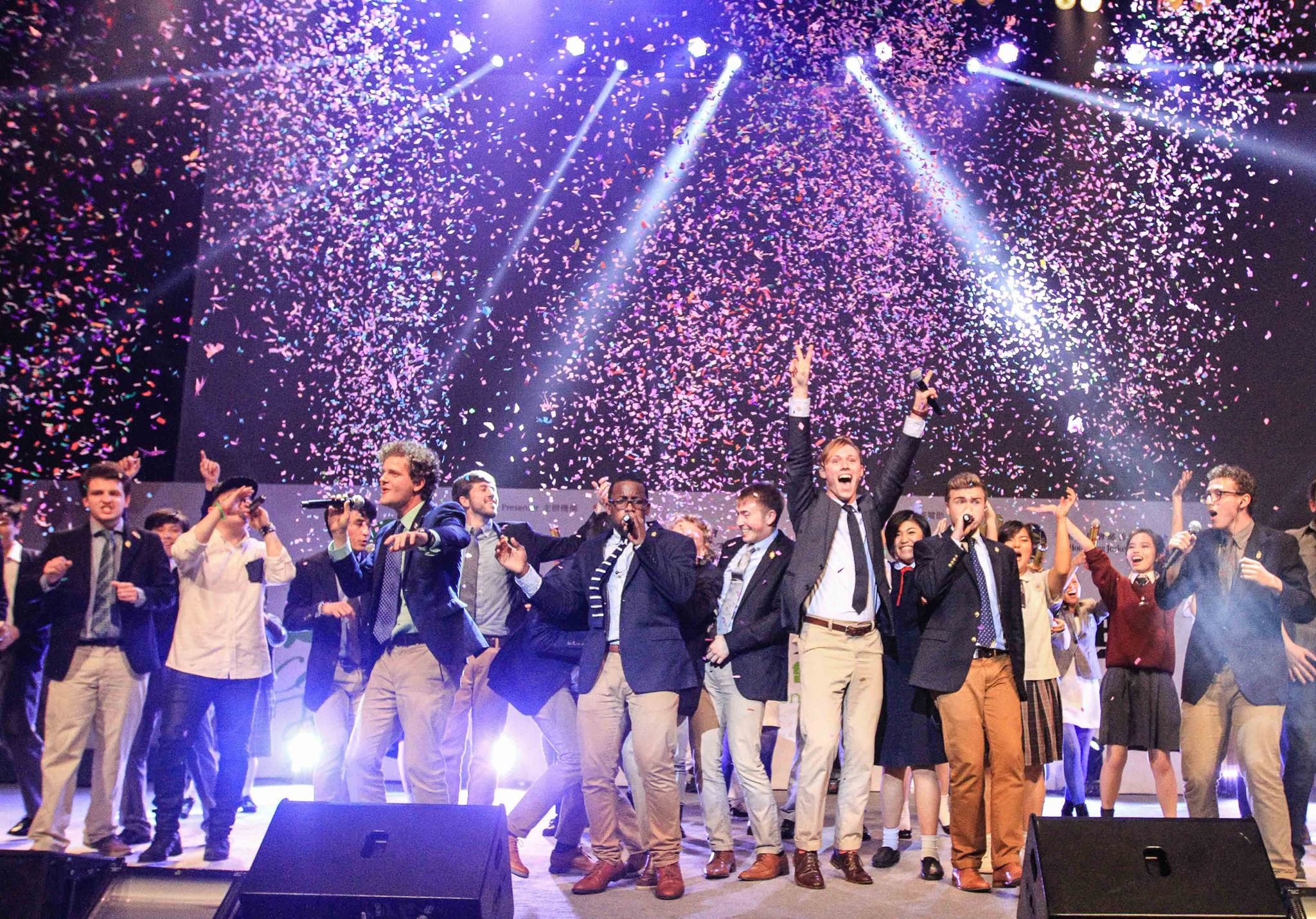
The Jabberwocks tour Hong Kong (2015)

The group began in 1949 as an offshoot of the traditional Men's Glee Club when four members decided to start their own independent singing group. In 1956, Brown Music Department chair Arlan Coolidge, frustrated that the group was getting bookings that would otherwise have gone to the Glee Club, referred to the Jabberwocks as "a misguided small group of students whose product is a type of vaudeville." The original Jabberwocks, a double quartet, "wore grey flannel suits, white button-down oxford shirts, striped ties and white buck shoes, and travelled to out-of-town concerts in a 1928 Rolls-Royce."

The Chattertocks, a female a cappella group at the Pembroke women's college, began as a parody of the Jabberwocks in 1952.

The Jabberwocks temporarily disappeared in 1975, was resurrected in 1980, and survived a brief period in the mid-1980s when some singers tried to take the group professional. Over the decades the group's repertoire has ranged from 1950s doo-wop, to Motown to contemporary pop.

For most of their history, the Jabberwocks were an all-male ensemble, with a brief co-ed period after Pembroke was merged into Brown in 1971. As of the fall of 2019, the group began accepting all genders and voices.

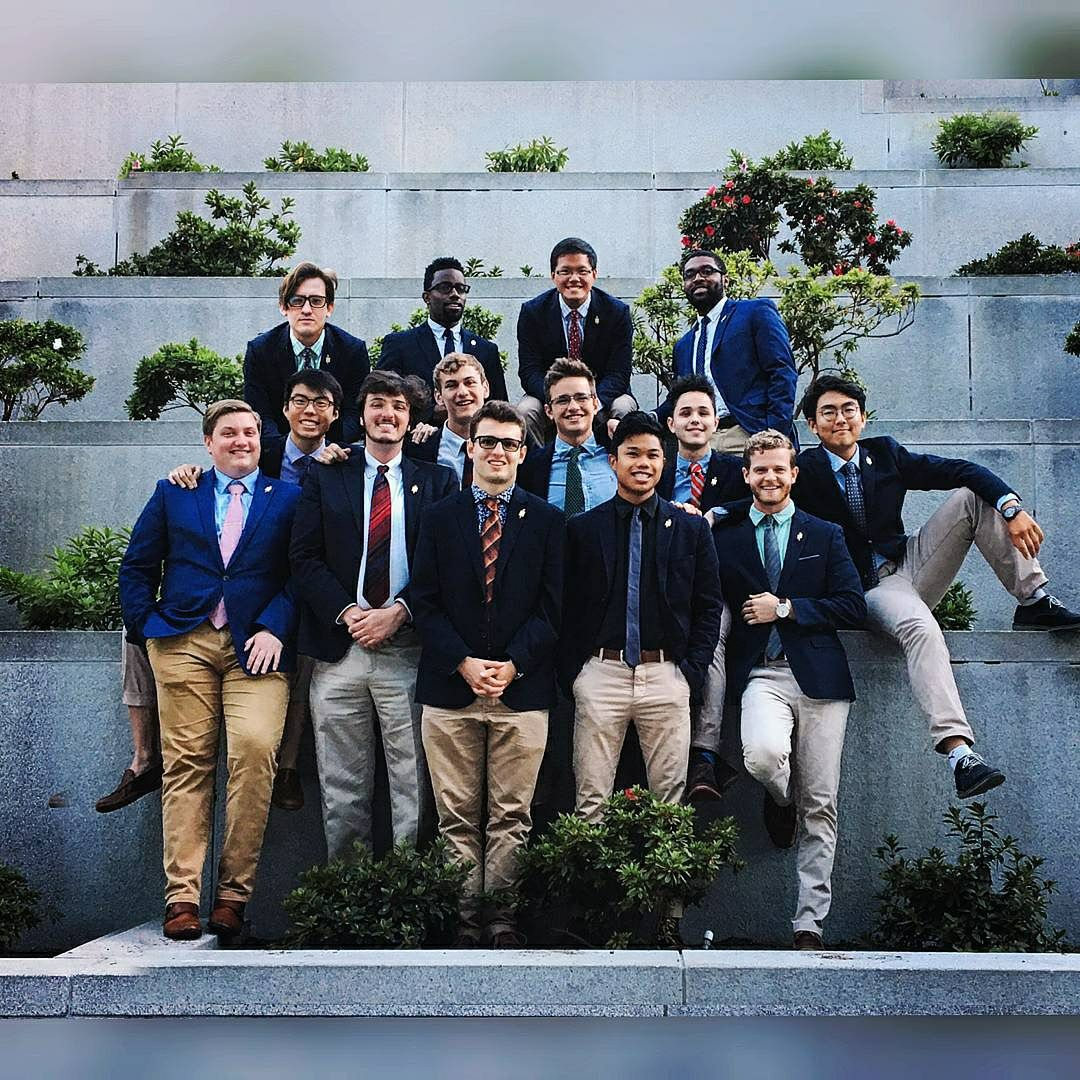
The Jabberwocks tour California (2017)

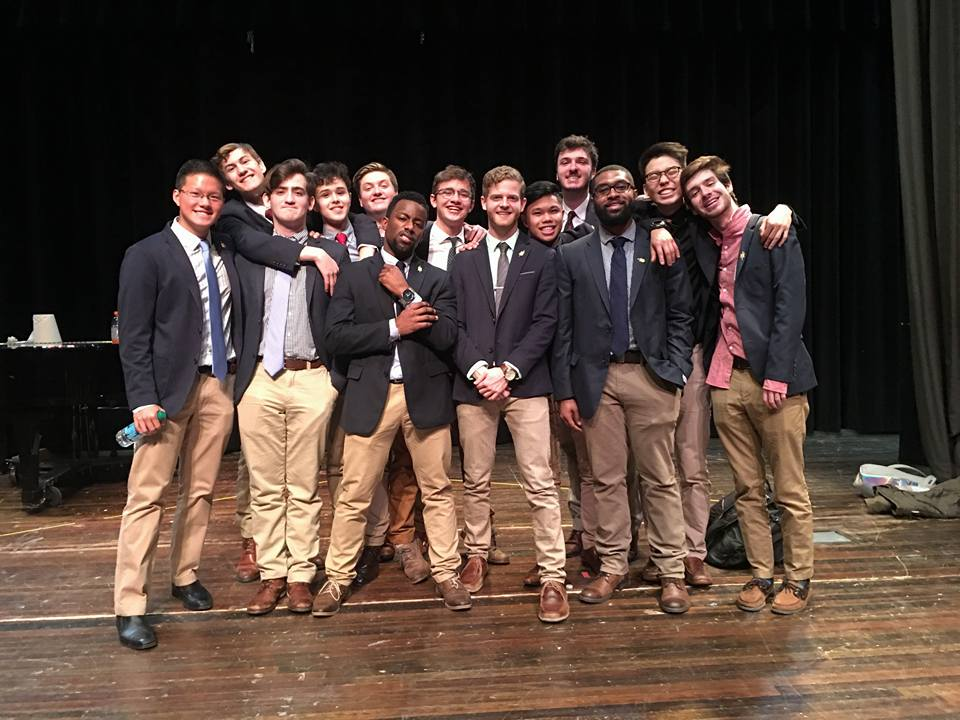
The Jabberwocks tour the NorthEastern United States (2017)

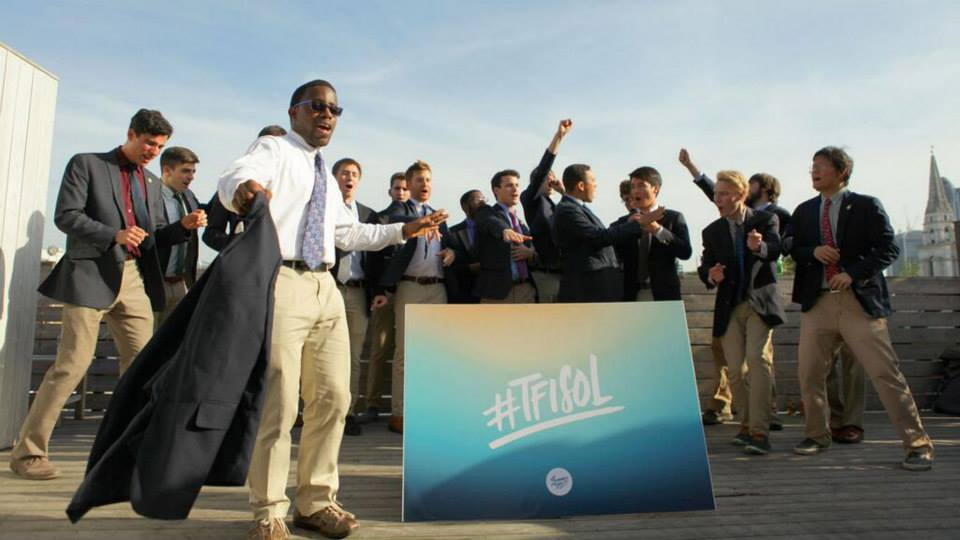
The Jabberwocks, and soloist Stephen Bozier '17, kick off their 2014 European tour with a gig for DigitasLBi UK

== Awards ==
- 1993, Freedom '90 (song), Runner up, Best Male Collegiate Song
- 2006, International Championship of Collegiate A Cappella regional quarterfinals, second place
- 2010, International Championship of Collegiate A Cappella's Northeast semifinals, second place
- 2010, Breaking & Entering (album) nominated for the 2010 Contemporary A cappella Recording Awards in three categories.
- 2017, "Taking the Fall" (album) nominated for the 2017 Contemporary A cappella Recording Awards in three categories.
- 2024, International Championship of Collegiate A Cappella's Northeast quarterfinals, third place
- 2025, International Championship of Collegiate A Cappella's Northeast quarterfinals, second place
- 2025, International Championship of Collegiate A Cappella's Northeast quarterfinals, Outstanding Arrangement for "My Mind (Now)" (arr. Jamie Nguyen, Anish Dharam, and Lev Seinfeld; opb. Paris Paloma)
- 2026, International Championship of Collegiate A Cappella's Northeast quarterfinals, third place
- 2026, International Championship of Collegiate A Cappella's Northeast quarterfinals, Outstanding Choreography for the entire set (chr. Jamie Nguyen)

== Notable alumni ==
- Keith Barbour, American singer-songwriter
- Kid Beyond, a singer, beat boxer and live looper based in the San Francisco area
- Harrison Chad, American theater, film, and television actor.
- Michael Weisman, actor, known for The Glee Project (2011), A.N.T. Farm (2011) and Hot in Cleveland (2010).
- Brian Cross, actor, known for originating the role of Arnold Gaesling in "The Snow Geese" on Broadway (2013).
- David Gockley, general director, San Francisco Opera
- James Naughton, American director, theater, film and television actor
- Andy Suzuki, American singer-songwriter

== Albums ==
The Jabberwocks of 1953

1. Old rockin' chair
2. How high the moon
3. Mood indigo
4. Hello, young lovers
5. Wade in the water
6. Aba daba honeymoon
7. Lindy Lou
8. Water boy
9. Never throw a lighted lamp at Mother
10. Soon one mornin'
11. Halls of ivy
12. Oh Joe

The Jabberwocks of 1956, Brown University

1. Be prepared
2. From this moment on
3. O Joe
4. Were you there?
5. Too good for the average man
6. On the chapel steps
7. Josephine
8. That old black magic
9. Steppin' around
10. Hello, young lovers
11. The farmer's daughter
12. Farewell song

Fascinatin' Rhythm (1958)

1. Fascinatin' rhythm
2. Autumn Leaves
3. From this moment on
4. Too darn hot
5. Dancing on the ceiling
6. Coventry carol
7. Halls of ivy
8. My ideal
9. Wonderful Copenhagen
10. Tea for two
11. Swing low
12. Good news
13. Farewell song

A peace of ourselves (1969)

1. Enter the young (2:24)
2. My old desk (2:15)
3. Medley: The guys' song; The worst that could happen; Orange air (6:53)
4. Hey Jude (6:46)
5. Obladi, oblada (3:05)
6. Never my love (2:56)
7. Mrs. Robinson (3:23)
8. Getting better (2:15)
9. Medley: The fiddle and the drum; Requiem for the masses (5:34)

Streetnight (1984)

1. Tuxedo Junction
2. Lean on me
3. Every time we say goodbye
4. Take you back
5. Some people
6. I'm gonna sit right down and write myself a letter
7. Me and the boys
8. Come go with me
9. Streetnight
10. Bright college days
11. Old black magic
12. Crocodile rock
13. Rhythm of the rain
14. You won't see me
15. Farewell song : traditional Brown song

Hangin' Out (1988)

Stylin' By the Tum-tum Tree (1990)

The Sharpest Tools in the Shed (1992)

Liz's Slingback Boots (1993–1994)

1. Intro
2. Me and the Boys
3. 7
4. Just the Two of Us
5. Get into the Groove
6. The Sweetest Thing
7. Take Five
8. Never Tear Us Apart
9. Black Dog
10. Walking on the Moon
11. Wanna Be Startin' Somethin'
12. I Will Survive
13. Why Should I Cry for You
14. Don't Stop Believin'
15. Farewell Song

Woonsocket (1996)

1. Don't You (Forget About Me) (04:30)
2. Sexual Healing (04:07)
3. How Come U Don't Call Me Anymore (03:51)
4. Lucy In The Sky With Diamonds (04:11)
5. She's Leaving Home (05:22)
6. With A Little Help From My Friends (02:32)
7. Don't Dream It's Over (03:53)
8. Me And The Boys (04:21)
9. Superman (02:51)
10. Vogue (05:58)
11. Blue Skies (01:20)
12. Farewell Song (01:57)

Sermons and Soda Water (1997–1998)

1. Me and the Boys (The Nylons)
2. Send Me On My Way (Rusted Root)
3. Change the World (Babyface, Eric Clapton)
4. Volare (Gipsy Kings)
5. Ribbon in the Sky (Stevie Wonder)
6. It's Still Rock and Roll to Me (Billy Joel)
7. Glory Days (Bruce Springsteen)
8. Ebony & Ivory (Stevie Wonder, Paul McCartney)
9. When We Dance (Sting)
10. Tempted (Squeeze)
11. Love Will Come to You (Indigo Girls)
12. All Night Long (Lionel Richie)
13. You're All I Need to Get By (Marvin Gaye)
14. Farewell Song (Brown Traditional)

The Jabberwocks: Fiftieth Anniversary Anthology (1949–1999)

1. Halls of Ivy (00:29)
2. Never Throw A Lighted Lamp at Mother (01:52)
3. Mood Indigo (01:58)
4. How High The Moon (01:31)
5. O Joe (01:44)
6. Fascinatin' Rhythm (01:51)
7. Old Black Magic (02:33)
8. Civil War (02:27)
9. Never My Love (02:52)
10. Come Go With Me (02:30)
11. Maine Girl (03:10)
12. Rock-N-Roll Lullaby (04:53)
13. Me and the Boys (03:57)
14. Freedom '90 (05:33)
15. 7 (03:56)
16. How Come U Don't Call Me Anymore? (03:51)
17. Send Me On My Way (04:01)
18. Farewell Song (02:03)

Listening Session (2007)

1. Sympathy For the Devil (2:56)
2. Don't Let Me Be Misunderstood (4:00)
3. The Seed 3.0 (4:19)
4. Fix You (4:51)
5. Ben Folds (4:05)
6. The Last Time (2:54)
7. Feeling Good (3:31)
8. Tonight, Tonight (4:25)
9. Get By (5:16)
10. Farewell (1:48)
11. Blackbird (2:45)

Breaking & Entering (2009)

1. You Know My Name (4:14)
2. Ain't No Sunshine (3:36)
3. The World's Greatest (3:54)
4. Viva La Vida (3:47)
5. Apologize 3.0 (3:25)
6. Gone (3:17)
7. Don't You Worry 'bout a Thing (3:45)
8. 3-Pain (4:26)
9. Higher Ground (3:55)
10. Bright Lights (3:56)
11. Dance With My Father (4:06)
12. I'd Do Anything for Love (5:58)
13. Farewell Song (1:42)

JABBERTALK (2013)

1. All of the Lights / Power (2:37)
2. Keep It Loose, Keep It Tight (2:50)
3. Retrograde (3:54)
4. This Woman's Work (3:44)
5. Use Somebody (4:13)
6. Ragged Wood (3:05)
7. Sweet Disposition (4:08)
8. Someone Like You / Set Fire to the Rain (5:53)
9. Mirrors (4:46)
10. With a Little Help From My Friends (4:08)
11. Farewell (1:44)

Taking the Fall (2016)

1. Sweater Weather (3:10)
2. Bad Blood (4:23)
3. Power Trip / Mine (3:48)
4. Me and Mrs. Jones (4:40)
5. Spider-Man (3:30)
6. Human Nature (4:04)
7. Stitches (3:33)
8. Brick (4:29)
9. Cry Me a River (4:27)
10. Drift Away (3:21)
11. Farewell (1:35)

Roommates (2019)

1. Take on Me (3:30)
2. If You Were The Rain (3:17)
3. All I Ask (4:27)
4. Finesse (3:26)
5. Climax (4:29)
6. No Me No You No More/Let Me Down (4:28)
7. Death of a Bachelor (3:34)
8. Sign of the Times (3:44)
9. Always on My Mind (4:21)
10. Farewell (1:34)

Picture of Us (2025)

1. Me and the Wocks (3:56)
2. Give You Blue (4:04)
3. A Cappella (1:54)
4. October Sky (3:27)

ICCA 2025 (2025)

1. My Mind (Now) (2:14)
2. Erase Me (3:12)
3. Matilda (3:34)
