= Houston Grand Opera =

American opera company

- Opera company
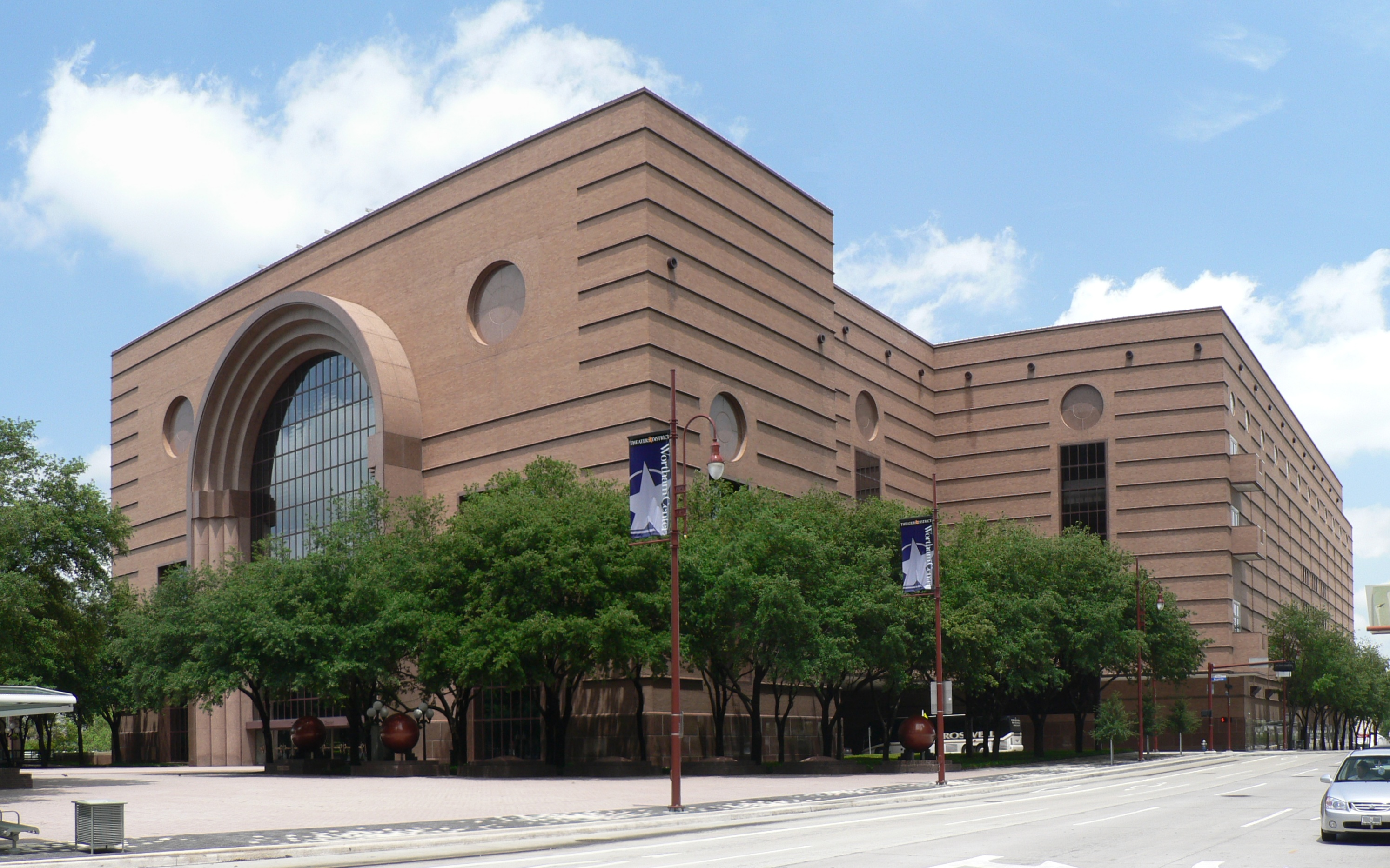
- The Wortham Theater Center, HGO's main venue
- Short name: HGO
- Founded: 1955; 71 years ago
- Location: Houston, Texas, U.S.
- Music director: James Gaffigan
- Website: houstongrandopera.org

Houston Grand Opera (HGO) is an American opera company located in Houston, Texas. Founded in 1955 by German-born impresario Walter Herbert and three local Houstonians, the company is resident at the Wortham Theater Center. This theatre is also home to the Houston Ballet. In its history, the company has received a Tony Award, three Grammy Awards, and three Emmy Awards, the only opera company in the world to win these three honours. Houston Grand Opera is supported by an active auxiliary organization, the Houston Grand Opera Guild, established in October 1955.

== History ==
In 1955, the German-born impresario Walter Herbert and Houstonians Elva Lobit, Edward Bing, and Charles Cockrell founded the company. Its inaugural season featured two performances of two operas, Salome (starring Brenda Lewis in the title role) and Madama Butterfly. David Gockley succeeded Walter Herbert as general director in 1972. During Gockley's tenure, the company began regularly commissioning and producing new works, primarily from American composers. Gockley remained as general director until 2005.

Anthony Freud succeeded Gockley as general director in 2005, and held the post until 2011. Following Freud's departure, joint leadership was shared between Patrick Summers, who had been music director at HGO since 1998, and Perryn Leech, who joined the company in 2006 and became chief operating officer in 2010. Summers took the titles of artistic director and music director, and Leech became managing director. For the 2017–2018 season, HGO performed at the 'HGO Resilience Theater', a temporary space created in an exhibit hall at the George R. Brown Convention Center, after the Wortham Theater Center was closed due to flooding from Hurricane Harvey in August 2017. Leech stood down as managing director of the company in December 2020.

In June 2021, the company announced the appointment of Khori Dastoor as its next general director and CEO, effective January 2022. Dastoor is the first woman ever named to the posts.

== Musical forces ==
The Houston Grand Opera Orchestra consists of 49 part time professional musicians and plays all Houston Grand Opera performances. The orchestra is a member of the Regional Orchestra Players Association and is a per service orchestra.

No music director was appointed during the Walter Herbert years (1955–72) until 1971, when longtime assistant conductor and chorus master Charles Rosekrans was named. Later music directors/principal conductors include Chris Nance (1974–1977), John DeMain (1977–1994), and Vjekoslav Šutej (1994–1997). Patrick Summers has been the music director since 1998. With the 2019–2020 season, Eun Sun Kim became principal guest conductor, the first female conductor ever to hold the post. In October 2024, the company announced that Summers is to conclude his tenure with Houston Grand Opera in 2026, and subsequently to take the title of music director emeritus. In November 2025, the company announced the appointment of James Gaffigan as its next music director, effective with the 2027-2028 season, with an initial contract of five seasons. Gaffigan is scheduled to take the title of music director-designate for the 2026-2027 season.

The Houston Grand Opera Chorus has been led since 1988 by chorus master Richard Bado, an alumnus of HGO's young artist training program, the Houston Grand Opera Studio.

== Young Artist Training ==
=== Butler Studio ===
Houston Grand Opera's young artist development program, The Sarah and Ernest Butler Houston Grand Opera Studio, was founded in 1977 to help young artists make the transition between their academic training and professional careers. The Butler Studio primarily trains young singers and pianist/coaches but has also trained aspiring conductors in a residency program of up to three years. An annual competition, now called the Eleanor McCollum Competition for Young Singers, was inaugurated in 1989 to help identify a pool of potential international artists for the Studio. Studio alumni include sopranos Jan Grissom, Nicole Heaston, Marquita Lister, Ana María Martínez, Edrie Means, Erie Mills, Albina Shagimuratova, Heidi Stober, Rachel Willis-Sørensen, and Tamara Wilson; mezzo-sopranos Jamie Barton, Joyce DiDonato, Denyce Graves, Susanne Mentzer, and Marietta Simpson; tenors Bruce Ford, Carroll Freeman and Norman Reinhardt; baritones Richard Paul Fink, and Scott Hendricks; bass-baritones Greer Grimsley, Ryan McKinny, and Eric Owens; and bass Eric Halfvarson. Other alumni include HGO Chorus Master Richard Bado, composer/conductor David Hanlon, former Lyric Opera of Kansas City Artistic Director Ward Holmquist, conductor/arranger/composer James Lowe, conductor/pianist Eric Melear, conductor Evan Rogister, and conductor/pianist Craig Terry.

In 2023 Sarah and Ernest Butler made a transformational gift to Houston Grand Opera, the largest in company history, by creating a new fund within the HGO Endowment. To honor their commitment to supporting excellence in the arts and the future of opera, the Houston Grand Opera Studio was renamed the Sarah and Ernest Butler Houston Grand Opera Studio.

=== Young Artists Vocal Academy ===
The HGO Young Artists Vocal Academy, established in 2011 and administered by the HGO Studio, is a one-week intensive program for undergraduate vocal music students. Participants selected for the program receive training that includes daily voice lessons and coachings as well as classes in characterization, movement, diction, and score preparation.

=== Bauer Family High School Voice Studio ===
The Bauer Family High School Voice Studio (BFHSVS) is a training program for high school juniors and seniors preparing to study vocal music at the college/conservatory level. It is one of HGO's young-artist training programs and is housed within the Butler Studio division. The program provides students with vocal coaching, masterclasses, artistic development, and resources for the college-audition process, including scholarships and prescreening recordings. The studio forms the earliest stage of HGO's artist-development pipeline, preceding the Young Artists Vocal Academy and the Butler Studio.

HGOco (see below) offers training to high school juniors and seniors.

== HGOco ==
In 2007, HGO established HGOco, an initiative designed to create partnerships between the company and the community. HGOco's first project, the ongoing Song of Houston initiative, creates new works focused on people and groups in Houston—the most culturally diverse city in the United States, according to a report of the Kinder Institute for Urban Research and the Hobby Center for the Study of Texas.

For its first commissioned work in 2007, The Refuge, by Christopher Theofanidis and Leah Lax, HGOco identified seven statistically significant immigrant communities in Houston and the creators began interviewing residents of those communities. The libretto was created from the actual words of some of the residents, and the premiere included performances by members from these communities.

In 2009, HGOco received the Leading Lights Diversity Award in Arts and Culture from the National MultiCultural Institute (NCMI) for Song of Houston.

As of May 2018, HGOco has premiered 22 new works, including eight short chamber operas focusing on various Asian communities in Houston, which were commissioned and premiered during a four-year series titled East + West. Recent HGOco premieres include Laura Kaminsky and Mark Campbell/Kimberly Reed's Some Light Emerges, about Houston philanthropist and humanitarian Dominique de Menil and her quest to create the Rothko Chapel; Gregory Spears and Royce Vavrek's O Columbia, realized through the collaboration of Houston-based NASA astronauts, scientists, and engineers; and David Hanlon and Stephanie Fleischmann's After the Storm, about the impact that Hurricane Ike and the Great Storm of 1900 had upon Galveston and the Gulf Coast. Song cycles have also been created in cooperation with workers in the Houston Ship Channel, the veterans community, and the Houston Livestock Show and Rodeo.

HGOco also administers:

- Summer Opera Camps for students in Pre-K through grade 12.
- Opera to Go!, a touring company that focuses on short musical works for children and families.

== Houston Grand Opera and new works ==
HGO has been commissioning and premiering new works since 1974. These include full-length operas for the main stage and chamber works with a community focus or for children/families.

=== World premieres ===
==== Full-length operas ====
The relationship between HGO and composer Carlisle Floyd is the longest ongoing relationship of any composer with an organization. HGO has commissioned five works from Floyd: Bilby's Doll (1976), Willie Stark (1981), The Passion of Jonathan Wade (new version, 1991), Cold Sassy Tree (2000), and Prince of Players (2016). Floyd lived in Houston for a two-decade period after relocating in 1976 from Tallahassee, Florida, to accept the M.D. Anderson Professorship at the University of Houston School of Music (now the Moores School of Music). In 1977, he cofounded the Houston Grand Opera Studio, HGO's young artist training program, which was initially a joint program between HGO and the University of Houston, and was an active participant in training Studio artists.

The John Adams opera Nixon in China debuted at the Wortham Theater Center in 1987. It was co-commissioned by the Houston Grand Opera, the Brooklyn Academy of Music, Netherlands Opera and the Washington Opera.

==== Chamber operas ====
HGO has commissioned and premiered 15 chamber operas created for children/families. These chamber works are staged and are approximately 45 minutes long.

=== American premieres ===
HGO has presented seven American premieres. Among them, the most significant are the first staged version of Handel's Rinaldo in 1975 (a concert version had been given in 1972 by the Handel Society of New York), starring Marilyn Horne in the title role and Samuel Ramey as Argante; Rossini's La donna del lago in a new critical edition in 1981, and more recently, Weinberg's The Passenger, a long-suppressed Holocaust opera composed in 1968 and performed by HGO in 2014. Besides presenting the American premiere in Houston, HGO was also invited to bring the production to the Park Avenue Armory as part of the 2014 Lincoln Center Festival.

=== Non-traditional opera ===
During the 2017–18 season, HGOco began a web-only series of 15-minute operas titled Star-Cross'd, based on true stories with a Romeo and Juliet theme. The series pilot, "Boundless," by composer Avner Dorman and librettist Stephanie Fleischmann, was released online April 20, 2018. Two more episodes are scheduled for release during 2019.

In 2010, HGO commissioned and premiered the world's first "mariachi opera", composed by the late José "Pepe" Martínez, the longtime music director of the ensemble Mariachi Vargas de Tecalitlán, with a libretto by Leonard Foglia. This work, titled Cruzar la Cara de la Luna/To Cross the Face of the Moon, has been performed at the Théâtre du Châtelet in Paris and by a number of opera companies in the United States.

In addition to commissioning and premiering new works, HGO has played a role in bringing certain existing works to the attention of the opera world. HGO presented a "triumphant" and "groundbreaking" production of Porgy and Bess in 1976 that restored portions of the work that had been cut for previous productions (including some made by composer George Gershwin himself for the New York premiere in 1935), thus allowing the public to experience the original vision for the work and making it clear that it was indeed an opera. After the Houston premiere, the production, featuring Donnie Ray Albert as Porgy and Clamma Dale as Bess and conducted by John DeMain, toured to Broadway and won a 1977 Tony Award for Most Innovative Production of a Revival. The complete recording won the 1977 Grammy Award for Best Opera Recording.

Scott Joplin's Treemonisha, which comprises a variety of musical styles even though it is often called a "ragtime opera," received its first fully staged performances at Houston Grand Opera in 1976 with a score HGO commissioned from ragtime expert Gunther Schuller. Treemonisha also toured to Broadway and was recorded.

== Houston Grand Opera and Innovation ==
=== Supertitles ===
In 1984, Houston Grand Opera began using supertitles on all non-English productions, becoming one of the first opera companies in the United States to do so.

=== Descriptive Services ===
HGO was one of the first opera companies in the United States (and possibly the first) to offer descriptive services for patrons with vision loss. It has offered descriptive services since the 1987–88 season, the inaugural season in the Wortham Theater Center. The service is offered free of charge and by request for any performance with 48 hours notice.

=== The Genevieve P. Demme Archives and Resource Center ===
In 1989, HGO became the first performing arts organization in Houston and the second major U.S. opera company to establish its own archives and resources center. The archives/resource center is named for the late Genevieve P. Demme, a longtime trustee and historian of Houston Grand Opera Association.

=== Plazacasts ===
On November 10, 1995, Houston Grand Opera became the first performing arts company in the United States to simulcast a live performance to an audience in another location. (The Royal Opera, Covent Garden, was the only other company at the time to have staged a similar event.) The performance of Rossini's La Cenerentola featuring mezzo-soprano Cecilia Bartoli that was taking place inside the Wortham Theater Center's Brown Theater was projected in real time onto a large screen mounted on the outside of the theater building. The event was free to the public. The audience was seated on the Ray C. Fish Plaza outside the theater, which prompted HGO to call the event a Plazacast. HGO held free public Plazacasts each year through the 2004–05 season (HGO's 50th season). In April 2005, the company simulcast both a performance of Gounod's Romeo and Juliet and its 50th anniversary gala concert.

=== Multimedia Modular Stage ===
In May 1998, Houston Grand Opera unveiled its Multimedia Modular Stage, a large steel structure with moving lights, projection screens for live-feed video and still images, and a big sound system. It was designed for large outdoor venues but could be adapted for other locations. HGO used it several times for outdoor performances in Houston and on tour, and once for an indoor production of Stephen Sondheim's A Little Night Music in 1999. Its last use in Houston was the night of June 8, 2001, in a production of Carmen at Houston's Miller Outdoor Theatre. That night, Tropical Storm Allison struck Houston, where the storm's worst flooding occurred. The two remaining performances in Houston were canceled, although the production went on tour as scheduled on June 15 and 16 to the Mann Center in Philadelphia. The effects of the storm, along with the impact of 9/11 and the collapse of Enron just months afterward, led to the retirement of the Multimedia Modular Stage, which was costly to assemble and disassemble.

=== OperaVision ===
In the fall of 2000, HGO devised and implemented a system of plasma and projection screens mounted in the Grand Tier and Balcony sections of the larger of the two halls in the Wortham Theater Center. This system—designed to provide close-up views of the action on stage and improve sightlines in the unusually steep Grand Tier and Balcony areas—was called OperaVision and received mixed appraisals from opera patrons. OperaVision was discontinued at the end of the 2004–05 season.

== Awards ==
=== Emmy Awards ===
- HGO: The Ring Cycle, Sculpting With Time Productions (Alex Douglas and Whitney Douglas), 2017, regional Emmy Awards for directing and photography
- Hitting the High Cs, Marion Kessell and Rick Christie, 1998, regional Emmy for editing
- Nixon in China, John Adams and Alice Goodman, 1988, for Outstanding Musical Program

=== Grammy Awards ===
- Nixon in China, John Adams and Alice Goodman, 1988, Best Contemporary Composition
- Porgy and Bess, George Gershwin and DuBose Heyward, 1977, Best Opera Recording
- Intelligence, Jake Heggie, 2026, Best Opera Recording

=== Grand Prix du Disque ===
- Porgy and Bess, George Gershwin and DuBose Heyward, 1977

=== National MultiCultural Institute Award ===
- HGOco's Song of Houston initiative, 2009, Leading Lights Diversity Award in Arts and Culture

=== Tony Award ===
- Porgy and Bess, George Gershwin and DuBose Heyward, 1977, Most Innovative Production of a Revival

== Premieres, recordings, and television appearances ==
=== World premieres through the 2022–23 season ===
- The Seagull, Thomas Pasatieri and Kenward Elmslie, 1974
- Bilby's Doll, Carlisle Floyd, 1976
- Willie Stark, Carlisle Floyd, 1981
- Starbird, Henry Mollicone and Kate Pogue, 1980
- A Quiet Place, Leonard Bernstein and Stephen Wadsworth, 1983
- Nixon in China, John Adams and Alice Goodman, 1987
- The Making of the Representative for Planet 8, Philip Glass and Doris Lessing, 1988
- Where's Dick?, Stewart Wallace and Michael Korie, 1989
- New Year, Sir Michael Tippett, 1989
- The Passion of Jonathan Wade (new version), Carlisle Floyd, 1991
- ATLAS: an opera in three parts, Meredith Monk, 1991
- Desert of Roses, Robert Moran and Michael John LaChiusa, 1992
- The Achilles Heel, Craig Bohmler and Mary Carol Warwick, 1993
- TEXAS!, Mary Carol Warwick and Kate Pogue, 1993
- The Dracula Diary, Robert Moran and James Skofield, 1994
- The Outcast (fully realized version), Noa Ain, 1994
- Harvey Milk, Stewart Wallace and Michael Korie, 1995
- Puppy and the Big Guy, Sterling Tinsley and Kate Pogue, 1995
- The Tibetan Book of the Dead, a liberation through hearing, Ricky Ian Gordon and Jean-Claude van Itallie, 1996
- Florencia en el Amazonas, Daniel Catán and Marcela Fuentes-Berain, 1996
- Jackie O, Michael Daugherty and Wayne Koestenbaum, 1997
- Cinderella in Spain/Cinderella en España, Mary Carol Warwick and Kate Pogue, 1998
- Little Women, Mark Adamo, 1998
- Resurrection, Tod Machover and Laura Harrington with additional materials by Braham Murray, 1999
- Cold Sassy Tree, Carlisle Floyd, 2000
- The Emperor's New Clothes, Mary Carol Warwick and Kate Pogue, 2001
- Sibanda!, Michael Remson, 2003
- The Little Prince, Rachel Portman and Nicholas Wright, 2003
- The Velveteen Rabbit, Mary Carol Warwick and Kate Pogue, 2004
- The End of the Affair, Jake Heggie and Heather McDonald, 2004
- Salsipuedes, a tale of Love, War and Anchovies, Daniel Catán and Eliseo Alberto / Francisco Hinojosa, 2004
- The Princess and the Pea, Mary Carol Warwick and Mary Ann Pendino, 2005
- Lysistrata, or the Nude Goddess, Mark Adamo, 2005
- Strega Nona, Mary Carol Warwick and Mary Ann Pendino, 2006
- Send (who are you? I love you), Michael John LaChiusa, 2006
- The Refuge, Christopher Theofanidis and Leah Lax, 2007
- Three Decembers (premiered under the title Last Acts), Jake Heggie and Gene Scheer, 2008
- Sleeping Beauty, Edward Charles Winkler, 2008
- Brief Encounter, André Previn and John Caird, 2009
- A Way Home, Ethan Frederick Greene and Irene Keliher, 2010
- Cruzar la Cara de la Luna / To Cross the Face of the Moon, José "Pepe" Martínez and Leonard Foglia, 2010
- Courtside, Jack Perla and Eugene Chan, 2011
- Your Name Means the Sea, Franghiz Alizadeh, 2011
- Pieces of 9/11, Jake Heggie and Gene Scheer, 2011
- The Clever Wife—a Chinese Folktale, Mary Carol Warwick and Hugh Behm-Steinberg, 2012
- The Bricklayer, Gregory Spears and Farnoosh Moshiri, 2012
- New Arrivals, John Glover and Catherine Filloux, 2012
- From My Mother's Mother, Jeeyoung Kim and Janine Joseph, 2012
- Past the Checkpoints, David Hanlon and Joann Farías, 2013
- The Memory Stone, Marty Regan and Kenny Fries, 2013
- Rapunzel, Mary Carol Warwick and Alvaro Saar Rios, 2014
- Bound, Huang Ruo and Bao-Long Chu, 2014
- A Coffin in Egypt, Ricky Ian Gordon and Leonard Foglia, 2014
- River of Light, Jack Perla and Chitra Banerjee Divakaruni, 2014
- A Christmas Carol, Iain Bell and Simon Callow, 2014
- The Pastry Prince, Mark Buller and Charles Anthony Silvestri, 2015
- O Columbia, Gregory Spears and Royce Vavrek, September 2015
- The Puffed-Up Prima Donna, Mark Buller and Charles Anthony Silvestri, January 2016
- Prince of Players, Carlisle Floyd, March 2016
- What Wings They Were: The Case of Emeline, John L. Cornelius II and Janine Joseph, April 2016
- After the Storm, David Hanlon and Stephanie Fleischmann, May 2016
- It's a Wonderful Life, Jake Heggie and Gene Scheer, December 2016
- Some Light Emerges, Laura Kaminsky and Mark Campbell/Kimberly Reed, March 2017
- The House without a Christmas Tree, Ricky Ian Gordon and Royce Vavrek, November 2017
- Monkey & Francine in the City of Tigers, Kamala Sankaram and David Johnston, January 2018
- The Phoenix, Tarik O'Regan and John Caird, April 2019
- El Milagro del Recuerdo, Javier Martínez and Leonard Foglia, December 2019
- Marian's Song, Damien Sneed and Deborah D.E.E.P. Mouton, March 2020
- The Impresario of Oz, Mark Buller and Charles Anthony Silvestri, June 2020
- The Snowy Day, Joel Thompson and Andrea Davis, December 2021
- Another City, Jeremy Howard Beck and Stephanie Fleischmann, March 2023

=== American premieres ===
- Hugh the Drover, Ralph Vaughan Williams, 1973
- Rinaldo (stage premiere), George Frideric Handel, 1975
- Robinson Crusoé, Jacques Offenbach, 1977
- The Panther, Philip Glass, 1981
- La donna del lago (new critical edition), Gioacchino Rossini, 1981
- Akhnaten, Philip Glass, 1984
- The Passenger, Mieczyslaw Weinberg, 2014

=== Video recordings ===
- Treemonisha, Kultur Video, VHS, 1982
- La Cenerentola, London/Decca, VHS and DVD, 1996
- Little Women, Naxos, DVD, 2010

=== Nationally televised productions ===
- Willie Stark, PBS's Great Performances, October 1981
- Treemonisha, PBS, February 1986
- Aida, PBS's Great Performances, October 1987
- Nixon in China, PBS's Great Performances, April 1988
- La Cenerentola, PBS's Great Performances, April 1996
- Little Women, PBS's Great Performances, August 2001

=== Audio recordings ===
- Porgy and Bess, RCA, 1977
- Treemonisha, Deutsche Grammophon, 1982
- Nixon in China, Nonesuch, 1988
- ATLAS: an opera in three parts, ECM, 1992
- The Dracula Dia, Catalyst/BMG, 1994
- The Song of Majnun, Delos, 1997
- Jackie O, Argo/Decca, 1997
- Little Women, Ondine, 2001
- Resurrection, Albany, 2002
- Florencia en el Amazonas'', Albany, 2002
- Of Mice and Men, Albany, 2003
- Cold Sassy Tree, Albany, 2005
- The Refuge, Albany, 2008
- Three Decembers, Albany, 2008
- Cruzar la Cara de la Luna, Albany, 2011
- Brief Encounter, Deutsche Grammophon, 2011
- Dead Man Walking, Virgin Classics, 2012
- A Coffin in Egypt, Albany, 2014
- It's a Wonderful Life, PENTATONE, 2017
- The House Without a Christmas Tree, PENTATONE, 2018
