= Where's Dick? =

1987 opera by Stewart Wallace

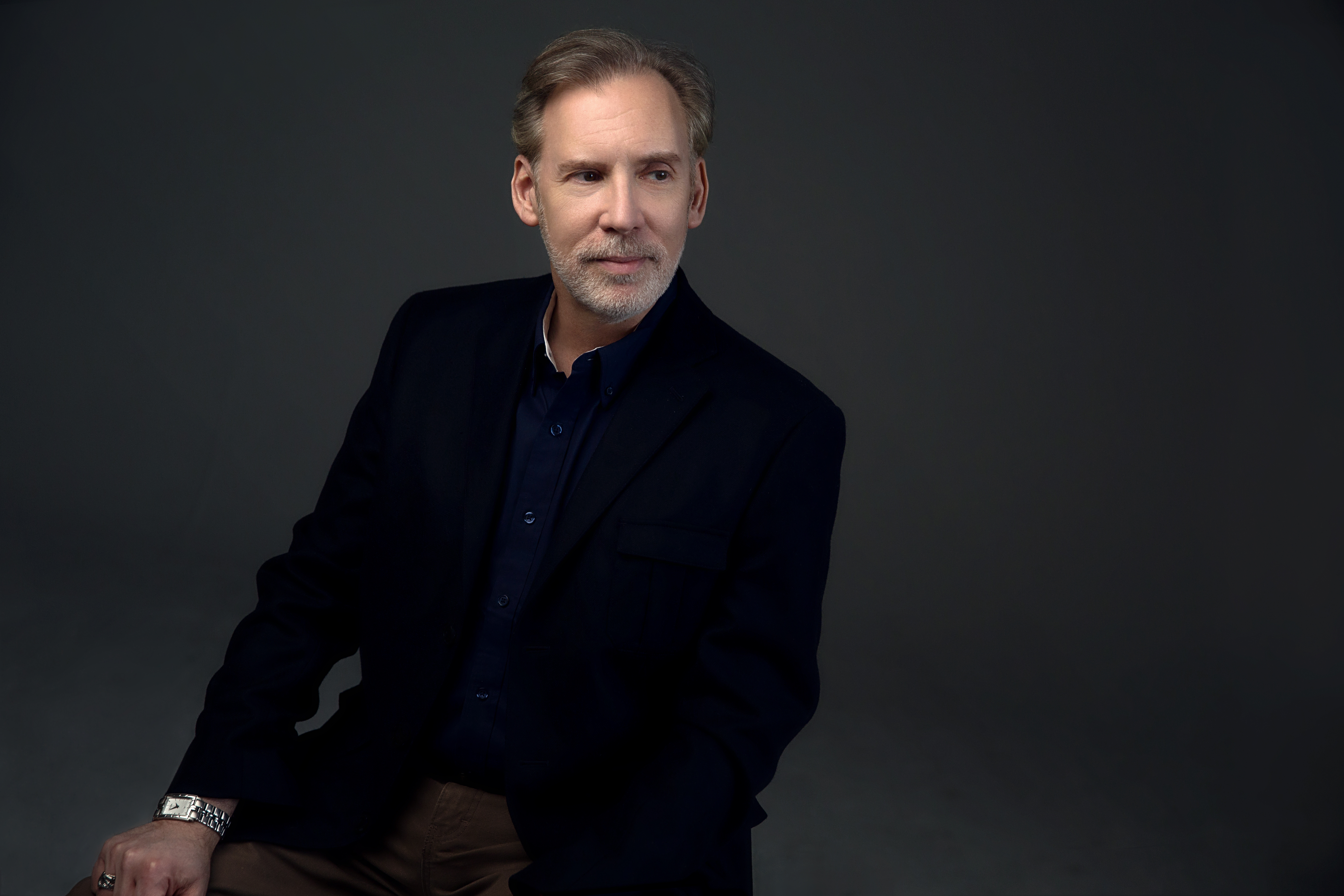
Michael Korie, the opera's librettist

Where's Dick? is an opera in two acts composed by Stewart Wallace. The work uses an English language libretto by Michael Korie. The opera is a satire on 1980s American life and tabloid journalism and follows the experiences of Junior ("an all-American boy") who in reaction to the crime and corruption he sees around him searches for the detective hero Dick Tracy.

It was first performed in a workshop format by Opera Omaha on 26 September 1987. The production was led by conductor Jeff Halpern and starred Consuela Hill as Chief Blowhard, Lauren Flanigan as Mrs. Heimlich, and Henry Stram as Junior.

The opera's first full-scale production and official premiere, with largely the same cast, was given at the Miller Outdoor Theater in Houston and was produced for Houston Grand Opera on 24 May 1989 by its touring arm, Texas Opera Theater. HGO music director John DeMain conducted a run of eight performances.

Where's Dick? was the first of Wallace's operas to be given a fully staged performance and the first collaboration between Wallace and his librettist, Michael Korie. They went on to create several more operas, including Kabbalah (1989), Harvey Milk (1995), and Hopper's Wife (1997).
