= The Bricklayers (1905 film) =

- Still from the film
- French: Les Maçons
- Directed by: Alice Guy
- Produced by: Société L. Gaumont et compagnie
- Release date: 1905
- Running time: 2 minutes
- Country: France
- Language: Silent (French intertitles)

The Bricklayers (French: Les Maçons) is a French silent film released in 1905. It is directed by Alice Guy, an often overlooked pioneer in the French film industry who was the first woman to direct a film. The film was made during Guy's time working for Gaumont. It features Les O'Mers acrobatic pantomime troupe and is inspired by 1902 Les Cambrioleurs modernes (Up-to-Date Burglars).

== Synopsis ==
Two policemen pass near a scaffolding on which bricklayers are working. The construction workers manage to pour plaster all over the unsuspecting patrolmen. Was it deliberate or an accident? A reprimand follows but the police let it go and decide to order a drink from the neighboring bar. They officers steal the bottle from the bartender, but the masons in turn, steal it from them. This brings more scuffling between the workers and the officers. A chase around the scaffolding ensues.

The film may be a loose remake of Les Cambrioleurs modernes (1902) starring Les Omer's, which reproduced the James Price troupe's pantomime from the operetta Le Papa de Francine (Victor de Cottens et Paul Gavault, 1896). Price's troupe starred in the 1907 remake of Path's 1902 film. The officers of The Bricklayers were dressed in English bobby uniforms perhaps in an attempt to disguise the origins of the story. In 1908, Pathé Frères was subsequently sued for copyright infringement for his remake of Cambrioleur modernes. Imitation was common at the time, this lawsuit brought an awareness as to how much one can legally imitate and adapt from other mediums.

== Film Production ==
Production Company: Société des Établissements L. Gaumont

Genre: Comic Scene

License: Public domain

Cast: Les O'Mers acrobatic pantomime group
