= Farnoosh Moshiri =

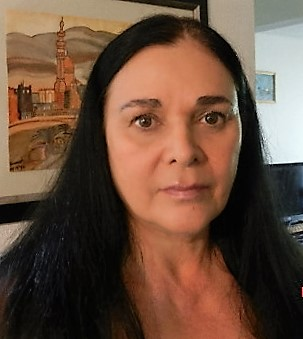
- Moshiri in her home in Houston, Texas
- Born: July 14, 1951; Tehran, Iran
- Occupations: Novelist, playwright, librettist, and professor of literature and creative writing
- Website: www.farnooshmoshiri.net

Farnoosh Moshiri is an Iranian-born novelist, playwright, and librettist. She teaches creative writing and literature at University of Houston–Downtown. Moshiri has published five books of fiction: At the Wall of the Almighty (Interlink, 1999), The Bathhouse (Black Heron Press, 2001, Beacon Press, 2002), The Crazy Dervish and the Pomegranate Tree (Black Heron Press, 2004), Against Gravity (Penguin, 2006), and The Drum Tower (Black Heron Press and Sandstone Press {U.K}, 2014).

Among other grants, fellowships, and literary awards, Moshiri is the recipient of Barthelme Memorial Award, C. Glenn Cambor/Inprint Fellowship: Presented by Inprint, Inc., Two Barbara Deming Awards (a grant for feminist writers whose work speaks of peace and social justice, two consecutive Black Heron Awards for Social Fiction, and Valiente (courage) Award from Voices Breaking Boundaries for artists who have taken risks to speak out and act as advocates. Her third novel, Against Gravity, was chosen by Barnes and Noble for Discover New Writer Series and by Borders Books in Original Voices selections.

Moshiri has spoken about her work and writing in exile at Columbia University, West Carolina University, Syracuse University, Bronx Community College, University of Houston Campuses, Rice University, Lone Star College Campuses, Houston Community College Campuses, San Jacinto College, University of the Incarnate Word (San Antonio), Asia Society, AWP Conference, Voices Breaking Boundaries, and more.

In 2012, in collaboration with the composer, Gregory Spears, she created a chamber opera by the name of "The Bricklayer" commissioned by the Houston Grand opera. The world premier was on March 16, 2012.

Moshiri has been a professor of literature, drama, and creative writing in College of Dramatic Arts of Tehran, Houston Community College, Lone Star College, Kabul University, Syracuse University, and the University of Houston–Downtown. She lives and writes in Houston.

== Early life and education ==
Moshiri grew up in a literary family. Her uncle, Fereydoon Moshiri was one of the most prominent and popular poets of Iran. Moshiri wrote fiction and poetry since she was a child. Her first short story was published in "Sokhan" (one the prestigious literary periodicals of pre-revolutionary Iran) when she was eighteen years old. She was also a ballet dancer and a member of the National Iranian Ballet Company, where she danced in major classical ballet performances in the 60s and the early 70s. Moshiri left the ballet company to study playwriting at the College of Dramatic Arts. During the 70s, she wrote plays and short stories and went onstage as actress. In 1977, with a scholarship, she entered the graduate studies of drama at the University of Iowa. In 1979, after receiving master's degree in dramatic literature, she returned to Iran to teach at the College of Dramatic Arts. In this period, she wrote plays and short stories, and published translated literature from English into Persian. In 1983, the rehearsals of her full-length play were interrupted by the guards and the director and actors were arrested. She was purged from her job as a professor and a dramaturg and had no way other than exile. She left the country on foot, living in the refugee camps of Afghanistan and India. In the summer of 1986 she received right of asylum from the U.S. and a few months later entered the graduate program of creative writing at the University of Houston, where she received MFA in Fiction. She published novels and stories, taught literature, and held fiction workshops for the decades to come.

== Works ==
Novels

- At the Wall of the Almighty (1999) (novel)
- The Batthouse (2001) (novel)
- Against Gravity (2006) (novel)
- The Bathhouse (2007) (audio book)
- The Drum Tower (2014) (novel)

Story collections

- The Crazy Dervish and the Pomegranate Tree (2004) (short story)

Opera

- The Bricklayer (Opera Libretto) (2012) (opera)

Short stories in anthologies

- A World Between (1999) (short story)
- Red Boots & Attitude (2003) (short story)
- Coloring Book (2004) (short story)
- Let Me Tell You Where I've Been (2006) (short story)
- At the Shepherd's (2007) (short story)
- I Go to the Ruined Place (2009) (short story)
- White Torture (2013) (short story)

Foreign language translations

- The Bathhouse (2001) (novel), translated into Portuguese, Spanish, Italian, and Indonesian

== Awards and reviews ==
=== Awards won ===
- Black Heron Press Award for Social Fiction for The Drum Tower (2014)
- Barbara Deming Award for Feminist Writers (2013), for the novel in progress, Gazelle
- Winner of the Florida Review's 2008 Editor's Prize in Creative Non-Fiction
- The 2006 Valiente Award of Voice Breaking Boundaries
- Black Heron Press Award for Social Fiction for The Crazy Dervish and the Pomegranate Tree (2003)
- Black Heron Press Award for Social Fiction for The Bathhouse (2001)
- Barbara Deming Award for Peace and Social Justice (1999)
- Barthelme Memorial Fellowship for Non-Fiction (1997)
- The Prose Award of the University of Houston–Clear Lake, Houston (1996)

=== Reviews and literary criticism ===
- J. G. Stinson, Foreword Reviews: August 2014. A review of The Drum Tower
- Eric Mayrhofer, Curious Animal, December 7, 2014: A review of The Drum Tower
- Kirkus Reviews (Starred Review), September 18, 2014: A review of The Drum Tower
- Publishers Weekly, August 25, 2014: A Review of The Drum Tower
- Kate Wilson, Book Trust, November 6, 2014: A Review of The Drum Tower
- Alan Caruba, Bookviews—December 2014: A Review of The Drum Tower
- Azadeh Moaveni, Financial Times, December 5, 2014: A Review of The Drum Tower
- London Times, January 4, 2015: A Review of The Drum Tower
- Susan Bethany, The Midwest Book Review: A Review of The Drum Tower
- Wall Street Journal: "A Glimpse Behind the Wall." A review of "The Bricklayer" (operetta)

By Heidi Waleson. March 20, 2012.

- Payvand Iran News: "Iranian Exile Experience on Stage."
- Culture Map: A review of "The Bricklayer" (operetta) by Joel Luks. March 25, 2012
- Minnesota Review: Republics of the Imagination (Issue 68, 2007)
- New York Times, Houston Chronicle, Washington Post, Boston Globe, etc. on Against Gravity. (2006)
- Nasrin Rahmineh (McMaster University-Canada): The Bathhouse, a review in Iranian Studies: Journal of The International Society for Iranian Studies. Volume 37. Number 4. Dec. 2004.
- Margaret Atwood: "Resisting the Veil: Reports from a Revolution": A review of The Bathhouse in Walrus, Jan. 2004.
- Alan Cheuse: All Things Considered. A review of The Bathhouse. May 2003.
- Gloria Emerson: The Nation. A review of The Bathhouse. June 2003.
- Melanie Jennings: Writers Monthly. A review of The Bathhouse. June 2003.
