= Stewart Wallace =

American composer and cantor (born 1960)

Stewart Wallace (born 1960, Philadelphia, Pennsylvania) is an American composer and cantor.

== Biography ==
The son of Marsha J. Wallace and Dr. Sidney Wallace, Wallace is one of three siblings in his family. Wallace attended the University of Texas at Austin.

Without formal training in composition, Wallace has spent much of his career composing experimental operas, from the dance-centered Kabbalah (1989) to the surrealist Hopper's Wife (1992). Two of his operas have been premiered at the Houston Grand Opera, Where's Dick? (1989) and Harvey Milk (1995). His opera The Bonesetter's Daughter is based on the novel of the same name by Amy Tan, who wrote the opera's libretto. The Bonesetter's Daughter premiered at San Francisco Opera in 2008. In 2010, Wallace was in a bicycle accident that resulted in traumatic brain injury and prevented him from composing, for a five-year period.

Wallace and Korie prepared a revised 2-act version of Harvey Milk for Opera Parallèle in San Francisco, who jointly commissioned the revision with Opera Theatre of Saint Louis, with an intended premiere performance run in 2020. The COVID-19 pandemic caused the postponement of this scheduled San Francisco production. The revised 2-act version of Harvey Milk received its premiere at Opera Theatre of Saint Louis on 11 June 2022.

Wallace married the American television journalist Dianne Festa in 1999.
