= Björling =

Björling is a Swedish surname. Notable people with the surname include:

- Anna-Lisa Björling (1910–2006), Swedish opera singer and actress
- Carl Fabian Björling (1839–1910), Swedish mathematician and meteorologist
- Carl Georg Björling (1870–1934), Swedish lawyer
- Emanuel Björling (1808–1872), Swedish mathematician
- Ewa Björling (born 1961), Swedish politician
- Gunnar Björling (1887–1960), Finnish poet
- Johan Alfred Björling (1871–1892/93), Swedish botanist and explorer
- Jussi Björling (1911–1960), Swedish opera singer
- Renée Björling (1898–1975), Swedish actress
- Sigurd Björling (1907–1983), Swedish opera singer

== See also ==
- Björlin
