= Carl Björling =

Carl Björling may refer to:

- Carl Fabian Björling (1839–1910), Swedish mathematician and meteorologist
- Carl Georg Björling (1870–1934), Swedish lawyer and professor
