= Mignon (1922 film) =

1922 film

- Directed by: Preben J. Rist
- Written by: Marie Luise Droop
- Based on: Wilhelm Meister's Apprenticeship by Johann Wolfgang von Goethe
- Starring: Ida Andorffy; Lotte Behrendt
- Cinematography: Leopold Hutzleb
- Production company: Cela-Film
- Release date: 21 December 1922
- Country: Germany
- Languages: Silent; German intertitles

Mignon is a 1922 German silent film directed by Preben J. Rist and starring Ida Andorffy and Lotte Behrendt.

== Cast ==
- Ida Andorffy as Mignon
- Gustav Adolf Semler as Wilhelm Meister

And in alphabetical order

- Lotte Behrendt as Sperata
- Albrecht Viktor Blum
- Eugen Burg as Marchese Cypriani
- Walburga Gmür
- Alexander Granach as Il Gobbo
- Sascha Gura as Philine
- Max Hochstetter
- Hans Jensen as Friedrich
- Helmut Kraus as Laertes
- Willy Lengling
- Lotte Lorenz
- Josef Rehberger as Graf
- Preben J. Rist as Gran Diavolo
- Margot Seidel as Mignon im vorspiel
- Viktor Senger as Agolfine
- Siegbert Steinfeld

== Bibliography ==
- Jill Nelmes & Jule Selbo. Women Screenwriters: An International Guide. Palgrave Macmillan, 2015.
