= Jussi Björling =

Swedish tenor (1911–1960)

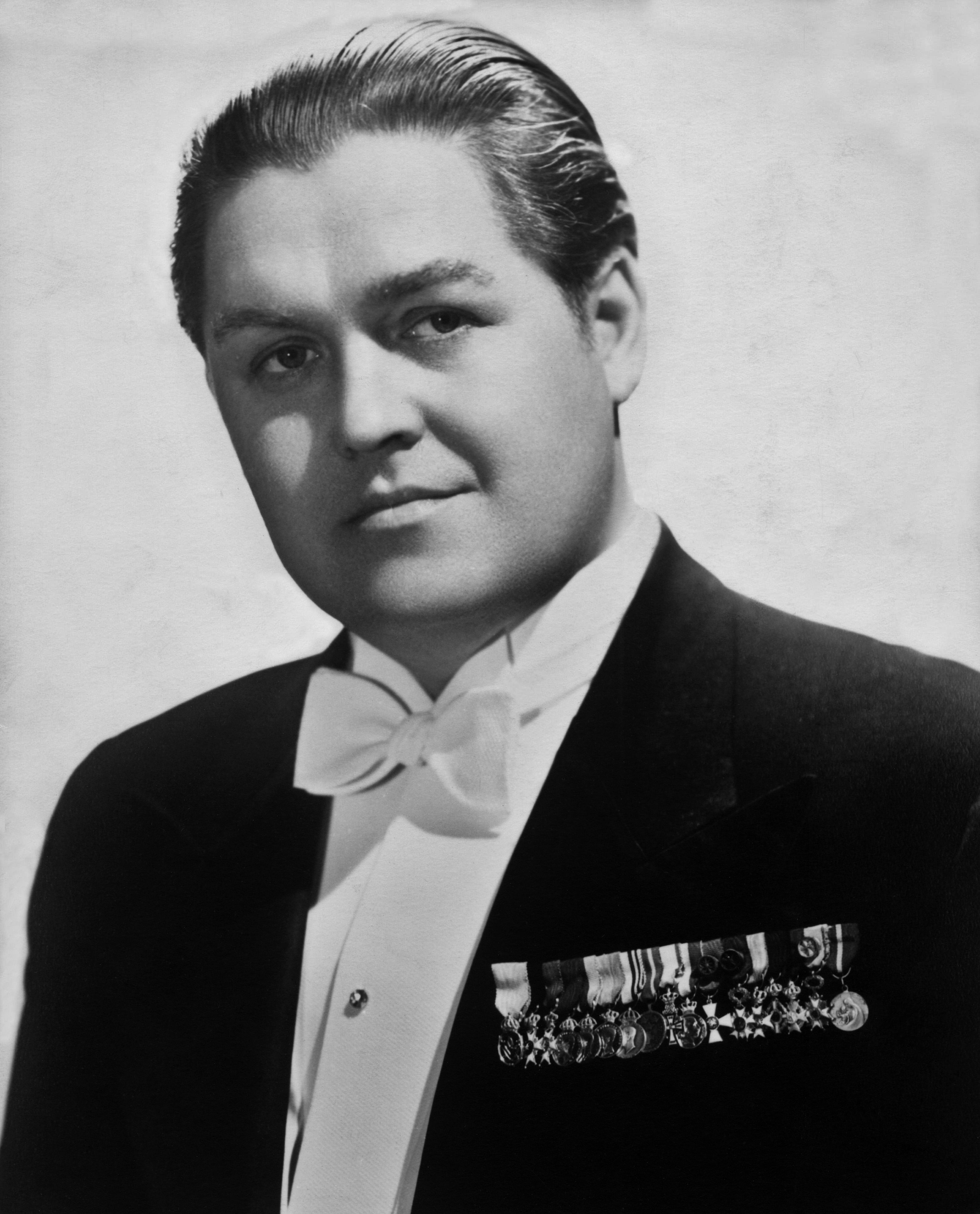
Jussi Björling in 1953

Johan Jonatan "Jussi" Björling (/ˈjuːsi ˈbjɔːrlɪŋ/ YOO-see BYOR-ling, Swedish: [ˈjɵ̌sːɪ ˈbjœ̂ːɭɪŋ]; 5 February 1911 – 9 September 1960) was a Swedish tenor. One of the leading operatic singers of the 20th century, Björling appeared for many years at the Metropolitan Opera in New York City and less frequently at the major European opera houses, including the Royal Opera House in London and La Scala in Milan. He sang the Italian, French and Russian opera repertory with taste.

Björling was ranked the greatest singer of the 20th century by a poll of music critics in Classic CD magazine (UK) in July 1999.

== Early life ==
Björling (surname also spelled as "Bjoerling" and "Bjorling" in English-language sources) was born in Stora Tuna, Borlänge, Dalarna, Sweden, in February 1911. The midwife's register shows he was born on 5 February, but the church baptism records erroneously show 2 February, and that was the day on which he celebrated his birthday throughout his whole life. He was known throughout his life by the name Jussi, which he received as a child from his Finnish-born grandmother (Henrika Matilda Björling née Lönnqvist, b. 1844 Pori, d. 1918 Borlänge). His father, David, was an accomplished singer and the first teacher of Jussi and his two brothers, Olle and Gösta, who also went on to become professional singers. He also performed with his sons as Björlingkvartetten or the Björling Male Quartet. Jussi made his debut public appearance at five years of age. The group performed in concerts throughout Sweden and the United States for 11 1/2 years. David Björling died in 1926, leading to the disbandment of the quartet and, as a consequence, Jussi Björling found work as a lamp salesman in Ystad. In 1928, Björling made his radio debut. In the same year, he auditioned for John Forsell, and was admitted to the Opera School and the Royal Swedish Academy of Music.

== Career ==
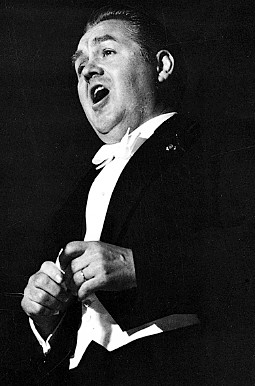
Björling performing at Skansen, Stockholm, in 1960

Björling made his first stage appearance in the small part as the Lamplighter in Manon Lescaut at the Royal Swedish Opera on 21 July 1930. This was soon followed by his official debut role as Don Ottavio in Mozart's Don Giovanni on 20 August 1930, with his teacher John Forsell as the protagonist. His other two official debut roles followed; Arnold in Rossini's William Tell on 27 December, and Jonatan in Saul og David by Carl Nielsen on 13 January 1931. This led to a contract with the Royal Swedish Opera, where Björling added 53 parts up to 1938. Among the roles he was entrusted was Erik in Der fliegende Holländer, Almaviva in The Barber of Seville, Duca in Rigoletto, Wilhelm Meister in Mignon, Faust, Vasco Da Gama in L'Africaine, Rodolfo in La bohème with Hjördis Schymberg, Tonio in La fille du régiment, Florestan in Fidelio and Belmonte in Die Entführung aus dem Serail. He was the first Swedish Dick Johnson in La fanciulla del West, Luigi in Il tabarro, Elemer in Arabella and Vladimir in Prince Igor, notably performing the part opposite Feodor Chaliapin in 1935.

In July 1931 he appeared in recital at Copenhagen's Tivoli, his first appearance outside Sweden as an adult. Björling appeared quite frequently as a recitalist, often appearing in summer recitals in Scandinavian folkparks and tivolis, while confining himself to more serious music during his recital tours abroad. In 1936–1937 he first appeared in recital and opera in Vienna and Prague and also appeared in Berlin, Dresden and Nuremberg in operas in Swedish in an otherwise German ensemble. In 1937 Björling made his recital debut in London and his first American tour as an adult. Björling made his American concert debut at the Carnegie Hall in 1937 – also appearing in opera in Chicago that year. On 24 November 1938 he made his debut at the Metropolitan Opera as Rodolfo in La bohème, where he remained on the roster until 1941, often appearing in opera in San Francisco and Chicago as well.

Björling sang the role of the Swedish King Gustave III in Verdi's Un ballo in maschera in a new staging, the first to be set in Sweden, at the Metropolitan Opera for the 1940/1941 season.

In December 1940 Arturo Toscanini invited Björling to sing the tenor part in Beethoven's Missa solemnis in New York, a recording of which exists. Björling also performed the Verdi Requiem under Toscanini in 1939 in Lucerne, Switzerland, and in November 1940 in New York, another performance that was recorded and eventually issued as an LP and CD.

Björling made his debut at the Royal Opera House in London in 1939 as Manrico in Il trovatore. The war confined his appearances to Europe. He appeared in opera in Copenhagen, Helsinki and Budapest and made his Italian debut at the Teatro Comunale, Florence, in 1943 in Il trovatore. In 1944 Björling was appointed hovsångare (i.e. "Royal Court Singer") by the Swedish King, Gustaf V.

In 1945 Björling returned to the US and appeared frequently at the Metropolitan Opera. His first performance at the Metropolitan Opera in New York City following WWII was as the Duke in Verdi's Rigoletto He sang many major tenor roles in operas in the French and Italian repertoire, including Il trovatore, Rigoletto, Aida, Un ballo in maschera, Cavalleria rusticana, Faust, Roméo et Juliette, La bohème, Madama Butterfly, Tosca and Manon Lescaut. He appeared as Don Carlo in the opening of the 1950–1951 season, but the relationship with Rudolf Bing was strained, and as a consequence he was absent for a couple of seasons in the mid 1950s. Meanwhile, Björling appeared with other American opera companies such as Lyric Opera of Chicago and San Francisco Opera.

Björling appeared at La Scala in 1946 in Rigoletto and 1951 in Un ballo in maschera. His planned Paris début in 1953 was cancelled, however, and except for recitals in United Kingdom, some performances in Yugoslavia, East Germany and South Africa in 1954, Björling rarely appeared outside Scandinavia and United States.

On 15 March 1960 Björling suffered a heart attack before a performance of La Bohème at Covent Garden. He insisted on singing in spite of his condition. Björling then made a short American tour, making his last operatic performance as Faust in San Francisco on 1 April 1960 and his final recital at Skansen, Stockholm, on 20 August 1960 (thirty years to the day after his official debut in 1930). He died of heart-related issues in his sleep on the island of Siarö, Sweden, on 9 September 1960, aged 49.

== Recordings ==
In 1951, RCA Victor recorded a series of duets with Björling and baritone Robert Merrill including a noted performance of "Au fond du temple saint" from the opera The Pearl Fishers by Georges Bizet. Among the first complete opera recordings to be issued on LP by RCA Victor was a 1952 studio recording of Il Trovatore, with Björling, Zinka Milanov and Leonard Warren. In 1953, Björling recorded the roles of Turiddu and Canio in complete versions of Cavalleria Rusticana and Pagliacci also for RCA Victor.

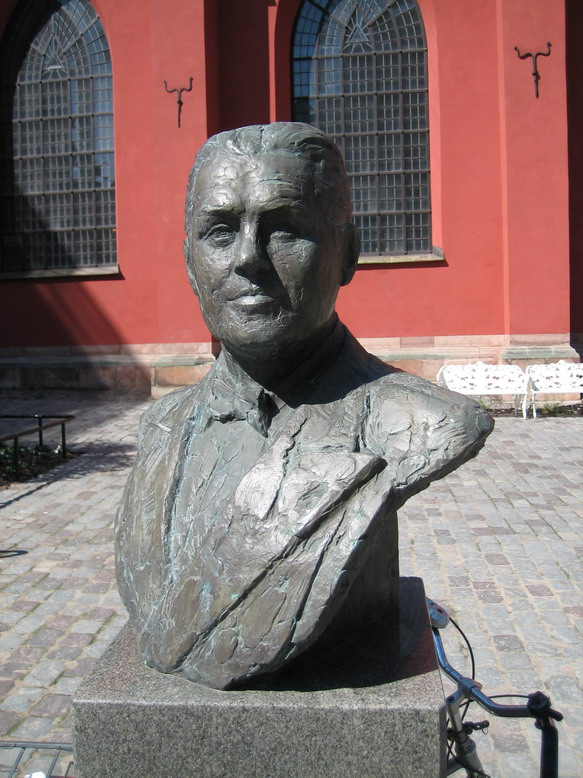
Bust of Björling in Stockholm

In the summer of 1954, Björling recorded Puccini's Manon Lescaut with Licia Albanese and Robert Merrill in Rome for RCA Victor followed by Aida opposite Milanov and Warren in 1955. Björling, Victoria de los Ángeles and Merrill, made a widely admired recording of Puccini's La Bohème conducted by Sir Thomas Beecham in 1956. Björling's 1959 EMI recording of Madama Butterfly, with de los Angeles in the title role and conducted by Gabriele Santini, is also widely celebrated. In Victoria de los Angeles's biography by Peter Roberts (Weidenfeld & Nicolson, 1982), de los Angeles noted that "In spite of technical developments, none of the Jussi Björling recordings give you the true sound of his voice. It was a far, far more beautiful voice than you can hear on the recordings he left".

In 1957, Björling, Milanov and Warren made a complete stereo recording of Tosca, for RCA Victor in Rome with Erich Leinsdorf conducting. The tenor was awarded the 1959 Grammy Award for Best Classical Performance – Vocal Soloist (With Or Without Orchestra) for his RCA Victor recital album, Björling in Opera.

In 1956, Björling appeared in the NBC television anthology Producers' Showcase in two programs entitled Festival of Music hosted by Charles Laughton, followed by José Ferrer. Björling can be seen with soprano Renata Tebaldi in excerpts from La Bohème. Both Festival of Music programs, originally broadcast in color, have since been released on black-and-white kinescopes on DVD.

One of Björling's final recordings was the Verdi Requiem conducted by Fritz Reiner for RCA Victor in June, 1960 with Leontyne Price, Rosalind Elias, Giorgio Tozzi, the Vienna Philharmonic, and the chorus of the Gesellschaft der Musikfreunde.

His 1961 album, Beloved Bjoerling, peaked at No. 142 on the US Billboard Top LPs.

== Personal life ==
Björling was known as the "Swedish Caruso". His son Rolf Björling was also a professional tenor and so is his grandson Raymond Björling.

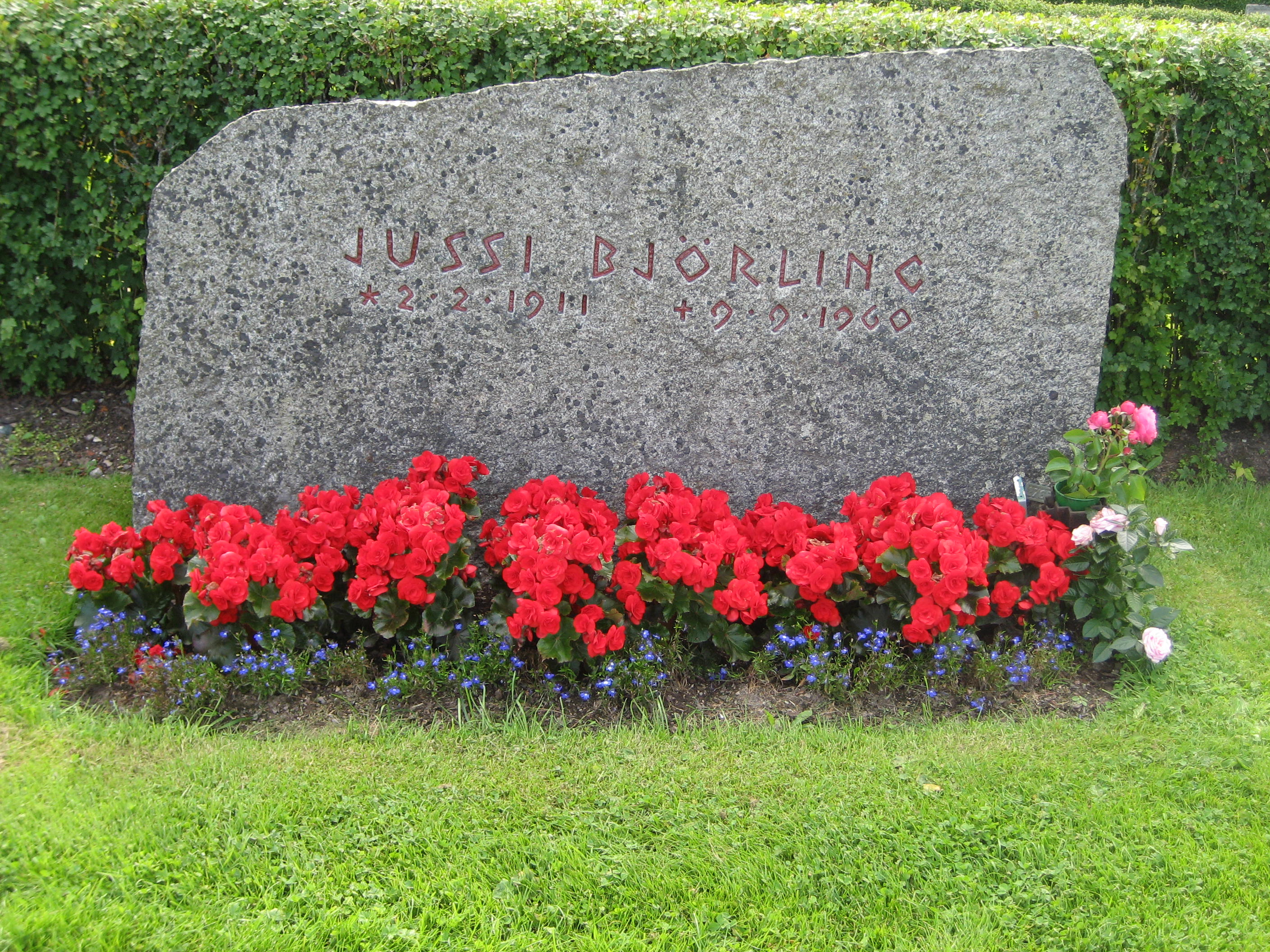
Jussi Björling's gravestone at Stora Tuna, Dalarna, Sweden

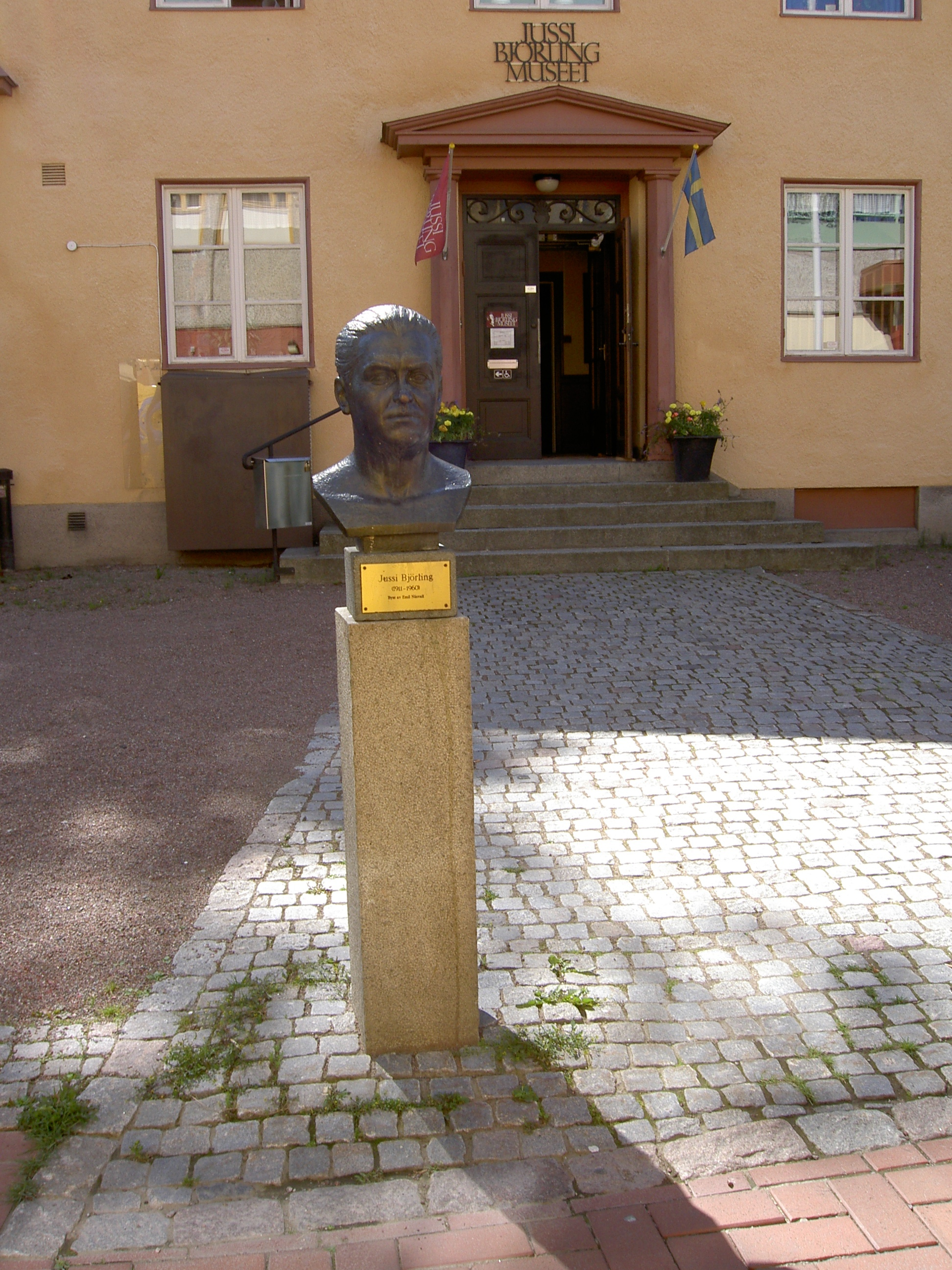
Bust of Björling in front of the Jussi Björling Museum in Borlänge

His widow, Anna-Lisa Björling, published a biography with the cooperation of Andrew Farkas that described Björling as a loving family man and generous colleague. Nevertheless, she did not attempt to hide the destructive influence of Björling's alcoholism.

He is buried in the church cemetery at Stora Tuna, Borlänge, Sweden.

== Legacy ==
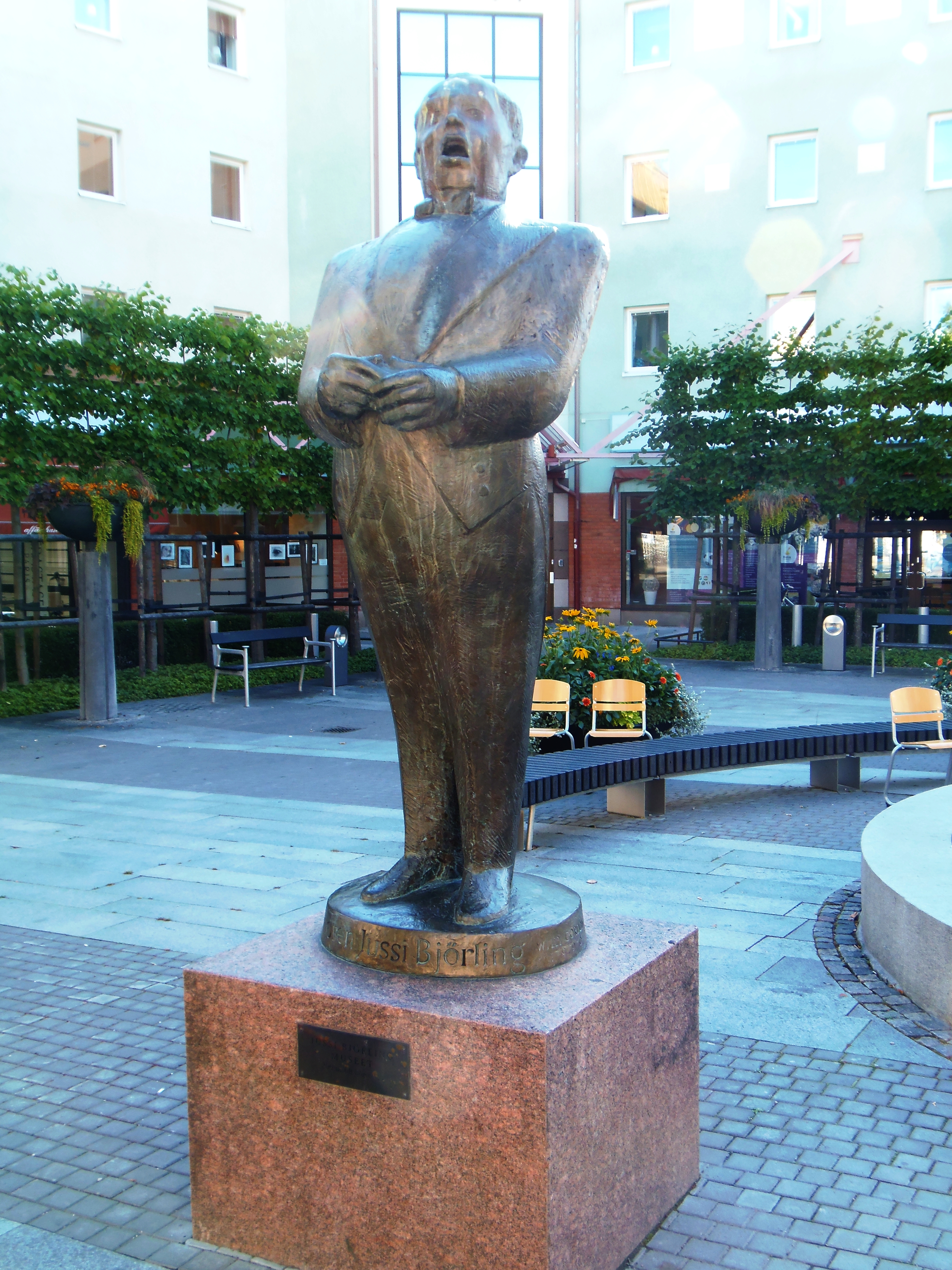
Jussi's statue in the square named after him in Borlänge, Dalarna, Sweden (60°29′10″N 15°26′02″E)

Gröna Lunds Tivolis Jussi Björling-stipendium (The Gröna Lund Jussi Björling Award) was established in 1963 by the Stockholm amusement park where Björling often sang, for its 80th anniversary.

Jussi Björlings Minnesstipendium (Jussi Björlingstipendiet) was established in 1970 and is administered by Stiftelsen Kungliga Teaterns Solister (The Royal Opera Soloists Foundation) in Stockholm.

The Jussi Björling Recital Hall was dedicated at Gustavus Adolphus College, St. Peter, Minnesota, in 1970.

The Jussi Björling Tenor Competition took place in Borlänge in 1994. 125 tenors from 38 countries participated and winner was the Chinese Deng Xiao-Jun.

Jussi Björlingmuseet (The Jussi Björling Museum) was opened in Borlänge in 1994.

Björling's name is now used with the prestigious Jussi Björling Music Scholarship at Gustavus Adolphus College in St. Peter, Minnesota.

An archive of nearly all of Björling's recorded performances, photographs, letters, recital and opera programmes, reviews, obituaries, and other items related to his career is maintained at the Jacobs School of Music at Indiana University Bloomington.

Luciano Pavarotti, in a 1988 interview for the Swedish daily newspaper Svenska Dagbladet, stated:

When I'm about to train a new opera, I first listen to how Jussi Björling did it. His voice was unique and it's his path that I want to follow. I would more than anything else wish that people compared me with Jussi Björling. That's how I'm striving to sing.

== Awards and citations ==
During his lifetime, Björling received many orders, decorations, honorary citizenships and other honours from monarchs, governments and cultural and charity organizations in Sweden, Finland, Denmark, Iceland, Latvia, Belgium, Greece, Hungary and the US.

- Appointed Hovsångare (Royal Court Singer) by the King of Sweden in 1944.
- Elected member of Kungl. Musikaliska Akademien (Royal Swedish Academy of Music) in 1956.
- Received Grammy Award for Best Classical Vocal Performance, 1960 (for LP "Bjoerling in Opera")
- Bjorling was ranked the greatest singer of the 20th century by a poll of music critics in Classic CD magazine in July 1999.
- He has a chair dedicated to him in Kilbourn Hall at the internationally renowned Eastman School of Music
- Entered Gramophone's Hall of Fame in 2012.
- (Belgium) Officer of the Order of the Crown (February 1947)

== Discography ==
Complete works issued on CD

- Aida, RCA (studio), 1955.
- Un ballo in maschera, Met, 1940; New Orleans, 1950.
- La bohème, Met, 1948; RCA (studio), 1956.
- Cavalleria rusticana, RCA (studio), 1953; Stockholm Opera, 1954 (other singers in Swedish); Decca/RCA (studio), 1957; Met, 1959.
- Don Carlos, Met, 1950.
- Faust, Met, 1950 & 1959.
- Madama Butterfly, EMI (studio), 1959.
- Manon Lescaut, Met, 1949 & 1956; RCA (studio), 1954; Stockholm Opera, 1959 (other singers in Swedish).
- Missa solemnis (Beethoven), NBC broadcast, 1940.
- Pagliacci, RCA (studio), 1953; Stockholm Opera, 1954 (sung in Swedish).
- Requiem (Verdi), NBC broadcast, 1940; Decca/RCA (studio), Vienna, 1960.
- Rigoletto, Met, 1945; RCA (studio), 1956; Stockholm Opera, 1957.
- Roméo et Juliette, Stockholm Opera, 1940 (sung in Swedish); Met, 1947.
- Tosca, RCA (studio), 1957.
- La traviata, Stockholm Opera, 1939 (sung in Swedish).
- Il trovatore, Covent Garden, 1939; Met, 1941 & 1947; RCA (studio), 1952; Stockholm Opera, 1957 & 1960.
- Turandot, Decca/RCA (studio), 1959.

Larger general collections on CD

- Jussi Björling: The Swedish Caruso, EMI Classics 2 17313 2 (5 CDs, 2008)
- Jussi Björling: The Complete RCA Album Collection, RCA 88697748922 (14 CDs, 2011)
- The Very Best of Jussi Björling, EMI Classics 6 78997 2 (2 CDs, 2012)
- Jussi Björling Collection, Naxos 8.101101 (11 CDs, 2012. Comprises studio recordings. CDs 1–8 earlier issued separately. Released in Sweden with notes in Swedish only.)
- Jussi Björling: The Swedish Caruso, Documents 600034 (10 CDs, 2013)
- Jussi Björling: The Worldstar Live on Stage, Documents 600129 (10 CDs, 2013)

Selection of special collections and concerts on CD

- Jussi Björling Live: Holland 1939, Norway 1954, Bluebell ABCD 006 (1 CD, 1987)
- Jussi Björling: The Atlanta Recital 13 April 1959, Bluebell ABCD 020 (1 CD, 1989)
- Jussi Björling in Song and Ballad, Bluebell ABCD 050 (1 CD, 1993)
- Jussi Bjoerling: Rarities, VAI Audio VAIA 1189 (1 CD, 2000)
- Jussi Björling: Fram för framgång: Film and Radio Recordings, Bluebell ABCD 092 (1 CD, 2002)
- The Jussi Björling Series: Radamès, Alfredo, Roméo, Bluebell ABCD 103 (2 CDs, 2006)
- Jussi Björling In Song, Testament SBT 1427 (1 CD, 2008)
- Jussi Björling Live: Broadcast Concerts 1937–1960, West Hill Radio Archives WHRA-6036 (4 CDs, 2010)
- Bjoerling Sings at Carnegie Hall, RCA 88697858222 (1 CD, 2011)
- Jussi at Gröna Lund: Complete recordings 1950–1960, Bluebell ABCD 114 (3 CDs, 2011)
- Jussi Björling in Concert: Finland & the U.S.A. (1940–1957), Bluebell ABCD 116 (2 CDs, 2012)

A complete list of Björling's recordings and their CD and DVD issues is available on the Jussi Björling Museum's website.
