= Magna Lykseth-Skogman =

Swedish opera singer (1874–1949)

Magna Lykseth
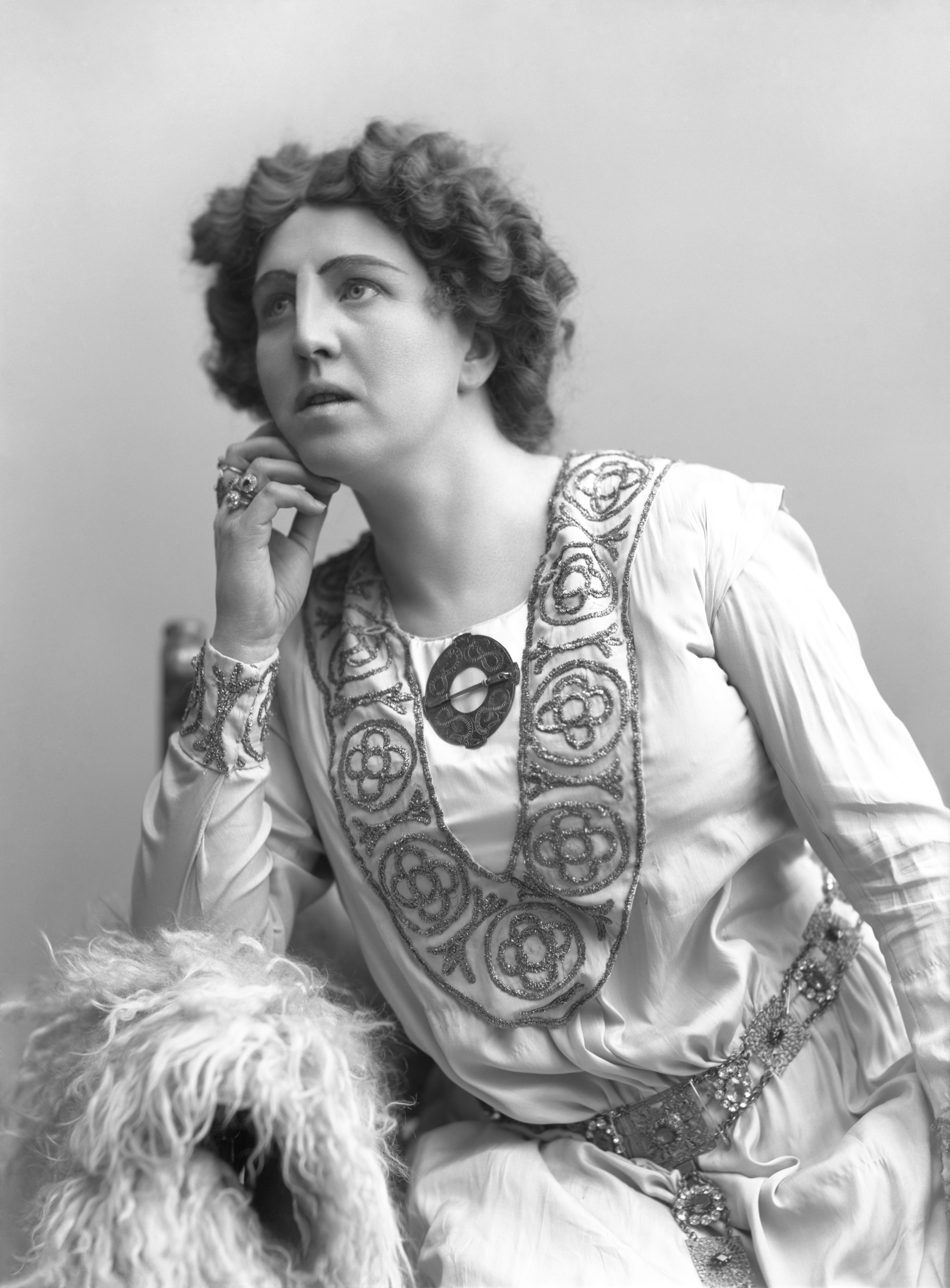
- Magna Lykseth as Isolde in Tristan and Isolde at the Royal Swedish Opera in 1909
- Born: Magna Elvine Lykseth; 6 February 1874; Christiania, Norway
- Died: 13 November 1949 (aged 75); Stockholm, Sweden
- Other names: Magna Lykseth-Schjerven; Magna Lykseth-Skogman
- Education: Christiana Conservatory; Royal College of Music
- Occupation: Operatic soprano
- Organization: Royal Swedish Opera
- Awards: Royal Swedish Academy of Music

Magna Elvine Lykseth-Skogman (6 February 1874 – 13 November 1949), also known as Magna Lykseth-Schjerven, was a Norwegian-born Swedish operatic soprano. After making her début at the Royal Swedish Opera in 1901 as Santuzza in Mascagni's Cavalleria rusticana, she was engaged there until 1918 becoming the company's prima donna. She performed leading roles in a wide range of operas but is remembered in particular for her Wagnerian interpretations, creating Brünnhilde in the Swedish premières of Siegfried and Götterdämmerung, and Isolde in 1909. Considered to be one of the most outstanding Swedish opera singers of her generation, she was awarded the Litteris et Artibus medal in 1907 and became a member of the Royal Swedish Academy of Music in 1912.

== Biography ==
Magna Elvine Lykseth was born in today's Oslo, Norway (then Christiania, Sweden-Norway), on 6 February 1874. She completed her schooling in Christiania, and after initial voice training at the Christiana Conservatory under Ida Basilier-Magelssen, she moved to Stockholm in 1894 where she was a pupil of John Forsell at the Royal College of Music. She also studied in Germany, gaining experience at the Bayreuth Festival. From 1901 to 1910, she was married to the Norwegian merchant Olav Schjerven and from 1911 to the Swedish Baron Karl Skogman.

In 1898, she made her début in a concert performance before going on tour in Sweden with Oscar Lomberg's opera company where her roles included Leonora in Verdi's Il trovatore and Philine in Mignon by Ambroise Thomas. In 1901, Lykseth made her début at the Royal Swedish Opera as Santuzza in Mascagni's Cavalleria rusticana, followed by Marguerite in Gounod's Faust. During her engagement with the company until 1918, she became particularly successful in her Wagnerian roles, creating the Swedish premieres of Brünnhilde in Siegfried (1905) and Götterdåmmerung (1907), and in 1909 the title role in Tristan und Isolde. She was a frequent guest performer at the National Theatre in Oslo where she premiered Puccini's Tosca (1908) and Verdi's Aida (1909). Due to her extensive repertoire, she became extremely popular in Sweden. As a result, apart from a few guest performances in Denmark and Sweden, she travelled little. Her wide-ranging voice and her stage performances contributed to her success in Italian opera, including Desdemona in Otello. Among her many other roles were the Countess in Mozart's The Marriage of Figaro, Leonora in Beethoven's Fidelio and Micaela in Bizet's Carmen.

Magna Lykseth-Skogman died in Stockholm on 13 November 1949.

== Awards ==
In 1907, she was honoured with the Swedish Litteris et Artibus medal and in 1912 she became a member of the Royal Swedish Academy of Music.
