= Johann Baptiste Lingg =

1920 film

- Directed by: Arthur Teuber
- Written by: Fred Schlick-Manz; Arthur Teuber
- Starring: Carl Auen; Irmgard Bern; Frida Richard
- Cinematography: Willy Goldberger; Willy Großstück; Max Terno
- Production company: Lullus-Film
- Release date: 29 August 1920
- Country: Germany
- Languages: Silent; German intertitles

Johann Baptiste Lingg is a 1920 German silent historical film directed by Arthur Teuber and starring Carl Auen, Irmgard Bern and Frida Richard.

The film's art direction was by Julian Ballenstedt and E.A. Zirkel.

== Cast ==
- Carl Auen as Johann Baptiste Lingg
- Irmgard Bern as Maria Braun
- Frida Richard as Frau Lingg
- Ludwig Hartau as Wilhelm I., Kurfürst von Hessen
- Albert Patry as Johann Lingg
- Alexander Ekert as Marias Vater
- Georg John as Gutsverwalter Wolleck
- Edmund Löwe as Napoleon Bonaparte
- Fred Immler as Leutnant Joui
- Oscar Marion as Carl Schröter
- Friedrich Degner as Pforr, Tuchbereiter
- Ilse Wilke as Mutter Schröter
- Viktor Senger as General Barbot
- Hella Thornegg as Marias Mutter

== Bibliography ==
- Jean-Pierre Mattei. Napoléon & le cinéma: un siècle d'images. Editions Alain Piazzola, 1998.
