= Wilhelm Meister's Journeyman Years =

1821 novel by Johann Wolfgang Goethe

Wilhelm Meister's Journeyman Years, or the Renunciants
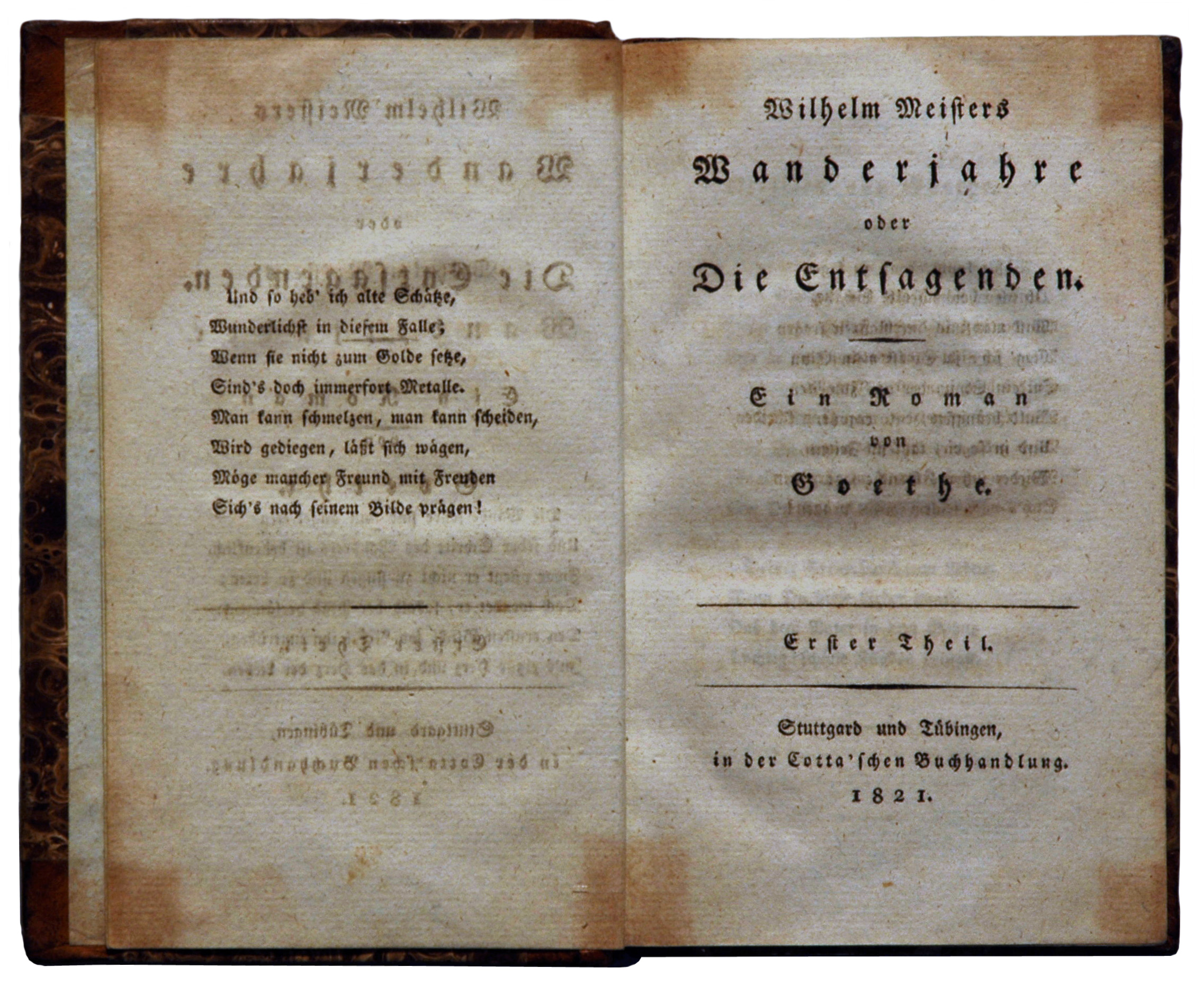
- Title page of the first edition from 1821
- Author: Johann Wolfgang Goethe
- Original title: Wilhelm Meisters Wanderjahre, oder Die Entsagenden
- Language: German
- Publisher: Cotta'sche Buchhandlung, Stuttgart
- Publication date: 1821 (1st ed.), 1829 (2nd ed.)
- Preceded by: Wilhelm Meister's Apprenticeship (Wilhelm Meisters Lehrjahre) (1795–96)

Wilhelm Meister's Journeyman Years, or the Renunciants, (Note: Sometimes translated, less accurately, as "Wilhelm Meister's Travels") is the fourth novel by German writer Johann Wolfgang von Goethe, and the sequel to Wilhelm Meister's Apprenticeship (Wilhelm Meisters Lehrjahre) (1795–96). Though initially conceived during the 1790s, the first edition did not appear until 1821, and the second edition—differing substantially from the first—in 1829.

The novel was greeted by mixed reviews in the 1820s, and did not gain full critical attention until the mid-20th century. Consisting largely of discrete short stories and novellas woven together with elements of the epistolary novel, lengthy sections of aphorisms, and several interspersed poems, the structure of this novel challenged the novel form as commonly practiced at the time of its publication.

A major theme running through the various parts of the novel is that of "Entsagung," translatable as "renunciation." The most famous section of the novel is probably the episode in which the protagonist and his son Felix visit the "Pedagogical Province."

== Plot ==
First Book

Chapter One: opens with "Flight into Egypt," in which Wilhelm Meister and Felix encounter a family in the course of their travels; the father of the family identifies himself as "Saint Joseph." Felix befriends the boys of the family, and returns with them to their residence. Wilhelm, declining their invitation to come as well, returns to his lodge at the mountaintop and writes to Natalie. The chapter closes with this letter. Wilhelm speaks here of his wish to be with her, and also comments on the rules guiding his travels: "Not more than three days shall I remain under one roof. I shall leave no lodging without distancing myself at least one mile from it." These rules are meant to give him – quite literally – journeyman status. He affirms to Natalie his determination to adhere to the rules, yet also betrays doubts.

Chapter Two: consists of the sections "Saint Joseph the Second," "The Visitation," and "The Lily Stem." In "Saint Joseph the Second," Wilhelm descends the mountain to the valley where this family lives. In their encounter the day before, Wilhelm had been struck by the resemblance of the family with familiar paintings representing the Biblical The Flight into Egypt; the father of the family had identified himself as "Saint Joseph." Now, visiting the family's residence, Wilhelm is astonished to see that paintings of the real Saint Joseph, as well as of the Flight into Egypt, adorn the family's home. The correspondence of the actual family's appearance with these Biblical images is made the more striking by the fact that the man who introduced himself as "Saint Joseph" turns out really to be named Joseph, and his wife named Mary. Joseph tells Wilhelm of why he came to be named after the saint, and how the Biblical images played a role in his life. "The Visitation" continues Joseph's story, telling of how he met his wife, Mary, when she lost her first husband in an attack by robbers in the woods, and he helped her to safety. "The Lily Stem" tells of how he gradually won her affection, and, after her mourning was over, they married and began to live in resemblance to the Biblical model in the paintings.

Chapter Three: opens with a letter from Wilhelm to Natalie in which Wilhelm comments briefly on the story he has just retold. He states a further rule of his journey: "Now in the course of my journey no third person shall become a constant companion. We wish to, and we are required to, be and remain two..." When the narration of the novel resumes, Felix's playmate Fitz leads Wilhelm and Felix into the mountains where they encounter their old friend Jarno (from Wilhelm Meister's Apprenticeship), who is now traveling under the name "Montan." Felix, who has developed a "tremendous interest" in stones, asks many questions about geology. The manner of Mountain's explanations leads him and Wilhelm into a discussion of human understanding, of the need for "resignation," and of the inadequacy of language and the written word to express what can be perceived clearly in nature. "Nature only has one kind of writing, and I don't need to get bogged down with so many kinds of scribbling," states Mountain, adding at the close of the chapter; "Precisely for this reason I don't talk with anyone about it, and I don't want – precisely because you are dear to me – deceptively to exchange the wretched stuff of dreary words with you any further."

Chapter Four: After further conversation with Mountain, the latter parts ways with Wilhelm and Felix, and takes Fitz along with him. As Wilhelm and Felix travel on, Felix follows an inexplicable intuition and makes his way into a cave in which he discovers a small ornate box. When Wilhelm finds him, he takes the mysterious box from Felix for safe keeping, and both agree that in this unexpected discovery, they share "a deep secret." As they then continue traveling on, they walk into a trap that holds them enclosed within iron gates. Felix has never experienced such constriction and therefore rages at being closed in, but Wilhelm calmly recognizes signs that the trap is employed out of necessity rather than out of cruelty. They are released shortly and brought as guests to the nearby castle.

Chapter Five: Wilhelm and Felix are welcomed by the family who live on the land on which they had been trapped. The master of the house shows Wilhelm an elaborate assortment of maps and images of cities; he cuts his finger while peeling an apple, and bleeds profusely at the dinner table. Later, when all get up to go to sleep, Hersilie asks Wilhelm, "Do you also read before going to sleep?" and hands him the manuscript of a short story she has herself translated into German from French. This text is "The Wandering Madwoman," which is then reproduced in full within the novel.

Chapter Six: Wilhelm is shown a gallery of paintings consisting entirely of portraits. "We chatter enough," is the patron's rationale – there is no need for narrative images that encourage this "dangerous characteristic of our intellect" any further. Wilhelm is also introduced to the house patron's liking for maxims inscribed around the house. One such phrase that is discussed in the chapter is: "From the useful, through the true, to the beautiful." There is some discussion of the way that short aphorisms of this sort can be variously interpreted – Hersilie points out that for women, it is often the inverse of "the maxims of men" that prove to be true. ("We women are in a distinctive circumstance.") Prefiguring the chapters that follow, there is mention of a venerable elder aunt who lives in a castle nearby (Makarie), and a cousin whose visit is expected soon (Lenardo). Another event, the meaning of which becomes clear only later in the novel, is Felix's fall from a horse that he is riding. Wilhelm witnesses his son's fall, but is not permitted to come to his aid, because he is not a qualified doctor. The chapter closes with letters between Lenardo, the Aunt, Juliette, Hersilie, Wilhelm, and Natalie. Lenardo sends a letter to his family announcing his intention to visit them soon; he has been traveling for three years without any contact with them other than an assortment of unexplained gifts. His aunt and cousins are perplexed and annoyed both by his long silence and by the presumptuous sudden return. This exchange of letters is given to Wilhelm; Wilhelm sends some of them on to Natalie as a way of sharing with her the family and community he now finds himself welcomed into.

Chapter Seven: In the early morning Wilhelm admires portraits in the gallery of the house, in particular one of a general who seems to look like Wilhelm himself. His host then joins him in the gallery, and they view a number of sixteenth-century portraits together. He expresses his pleasure at Wilhelm's appreciation for the past and its artifacts. Later, the family asks Wilhelm to visit their aunt Makarie, and also attempt to find out why their cousin Lenardo so inexplicably delays his announced return to the family. The narration is then interrupted for a brief account of the host's background: he was born in the United States, to which his father had earlier emigrated, but moved back to Germany as an adolescent. He decided that he prefers the European life: he would rather endure monarchy and the proximity of neighbors, he explains, than live in greater freedom in a country where he has to either conquer or deceive American Indians in order to survive in mosquito-infested swampland. There follows a discussion of religion, community, and resignation.

Chapters Eight and Nine: the novella "Who Is the Traitor?"

Chapter Ten: Wilhelm and Felix arrive at the home of the old woman Makarie, and are welcomed as friends. Makarie's friend the astronomer is also present, and, after a discussion of mathematics in the evening, Wilhelm and the astronomer ascend to an astronomical observatory where Wilhelm observes the night sky. The following day the young woman Angela tells Wilhelm about the archive that Makarie maintains, containing written records of spoken conversations – in these, she explains, things are said "that no book contains, and on the other hand the best things that books have ever contained." The archive contains the mathematical treatise that had been the object of discussion the previous evening, and Wilhelm is permitted to read and copy it. On the third day of their stay Wilhelm asks Angela about Makarie's unusual character, which has gradually revealed itself to him. Angela confides in him that Makarie possesses an intuitive insight into, and harmony with, the Solar System; this fact has even been confirmed by investigations carried out by the astronomer. (This foreshadows chapter 15 of book three). Finally, the conversation turns to Lenardo. Angela believes he is worried about having harmed an unnamed young woman, and she asks Wilhelm, as a favor to the family, to deliver a message to him in this regard.

Chapter Eleven: As he has been requested to do, Wilhelm informs the nephew Lenardo that a certain young woman named Valerine is happily married and living well. Lenardo is greatly relieved to hear this, and the nature of his reactions compels Wilhelm to ask who Valerine is, and what the cause of Lenardo's worry had been. Lenardo thus tells the story of "The Nut-Brown Girl." When he was younger, he had planned to undertake a journey around Europe. To finance this trip, his uncle had collected money from a longtime debtor who had one daughter, and whose wife was recently deceased. Fearing the consequences of this financial ruin of her family, the daughter – known as the "Nut-Brown Girl" because of her complexion – approaches Lenardo and pleads with him to intervene on their behalf with his uncle. Lenardo, knowing his uncle's character, tells her that there is nothing possible that he can to do influence the situation; "Do the impossible," she then pleads with him. Lenardo, who feels obliged because his travels are ultimately the cause of her coming hardship, tries and fails to gain some leniency toward her. A combined feeling of both obligation and affection toward her have compounded his sense of guilt over time; this is why the news Wilhelm brings is so welcome – since hearing from Wilhelm that she is living in happiness and prosperity, he knows that her life was not ruined because of him after all. Lenardo and Wilhelm decide to visit her; however, when they meet Valerine, his relief is suddenly shattered. The woman who greets them is not "nut-brown" at all, but rather fair and blonde. Since the girl in question had always been known simply by her nickname, Lenardo realizes that he had confused her real name – Nachodine – with that of another childhood friend – Valerine, the happy and prosperous woman whom they now find themselves accidentally visiting. Once again uncertain of Nachodine's fate, Lenardo anguishes. He and Wilhelm reach the agreement that, since Wilhelm is obliged continually to wander, he will now direct his travels toward finding Nachodine, and will send Lenardo word as to her circumstances. "I hope," Lenardo says, "that when I know the girl is happy, I will be free from her." Lenardo directs him to an old acquaintance of his who may be of help.

Chapter Twelve: Wilhelm arrives in a city that appears to have been burnt down and entirely rebuilt, judging by the striking newness of its appearance. Here, Wilhelm finds the old man Lenardo had directed him to, who engages him in a conversation about time, permanence, and change. Asked for advice as to whether to attempt to open the box, the old man says that while it might entirely possible to get it open, he advises against it: "... since you obtained it by such a remarkable chance, you should test your luck by it. For if you were born fortunate and if this box has meaning for you, then the key to it must eventually turn up – and just there, where you least expect to find it." Wilhelm decides to follow this advice, and leaves the box there for safe keeping. The conversation then turns to education, and to the question of where and how Felix should be schooled.

Second Book

Chapter One: Arriving at the Pedagogical Province, Wilhelm is struck by the unusual customs of the place. Since his intention is to entrust his son to them, the directors initiate Wilhelm in the pedagogical philosophy and methods of the Province. Music – singing in particular – is central to their mode of education; a distinct notion of respect – combined with elements of humility and awe – is at the center of the guiding worldview.

Chapter Two: Pedagogical Province features visual representations of the Israelites as an exemplary people. Wilhelm is explained the ideas of world history and the aesthetic principles that inform these images. Philosophical discussion of forms of representation dominates the discussion.

Chapters Three, Four, and Five: novella "The Man of Fifty Years"

Chapter Six: Consists of two letters: One, from Wilhelm to Lenardo, announcing that he has found Nachodine, and that she is living "in circumstances in which, for the good soul, there is little further that remains to be wished for." The second letter, from Wilhelm to the Abbé, expresses Wilhelm's "wish to complete my journeyman years with more composure and steadiness," and his resolution, after a new beginning, to live more in accordance with his inner inclination.

Chapter Seven: Wilhelm meets a painter, with whom he travels onward. The painter is greatly taken with the figure of Mignon, from Wilhelm Meister's Apprenticeship, whom he paints in many images; the initial purpose of Wilhelm and the painter's travels together is to visit the places where Mignon lived. Once they have done this, however, a further desire asserts itself: Wilhelm wishes to meet Hilarie and the Beautiful Widow. Both of these are characters from "The Man of Fifty Years" (the frame story of the novel and the novellas it contains begin to intermingle at this point). The two men and the two women spend time together at a lake and on an island. Their attentions are devoted to art, for which Hilarie reveals herself to have a talent; music, as the painter shows himself to be a gifted singer and lute player as well; and nature – the landscape surrounding them is exceptionally rich and beautiful. The episode reaches its climax when the painter overwhelms his companions with a performance of Mignon's song "Do You Know the Land?" from Wilhelm Meister's Apprenticeship. The two women depart the following day. The chapter closes with letters from Lenardo to Wilhelm, and from the Abbé to Wilhelm, and with an "Interruption" by the narrator, who informs the reader that a period of several years will have passed when the action resumes in Chapter Eight.

Chapter Eight: Arriving at the Pedagogical Province, Wilhelm is shown the various pedagogical practices of the institution: foreign language, instrumental music, singing, poetry. Felix, whom he has not seen for some time, is now nearing adolescence. The chapter contains the song "To invent, to resolve..."

Chapter Nine: Wilhelm is invited to a mountain festival, where he sees his friend Montan again. The two engage in a discussion of geology, and of theories regarding the creation of the world. Montan doesn't betray which of the many theories he himself believes in; when Wilhelm persists in asking who he agrees with, Mountain explains, "I know as much as they do, and prefer not to think about it"; "Once one knows what everything is all about," he adds, "one stops being talkative."

Chapter Ten: Letter from Hersilie to Wilhelm, in which she tells him of her astonishment when Felix – by messenger – confesses his love to her.

Chapter Eleven: Letter from Wilhelm to Natalie

"Observations in the Mindset of the Wanderers: Art, Ethics, Nature": collection of 177 aphorisms

The poem "Legacy"

Third Book

Chapter One: Wilhelm, traveling onward, arrives at an inn in the mountains. The words "Ubi homines sunt, modi sunt" – translated by Goethe as "there, where people come together into community, a way and manner in which they wish to be and remain together shows itself" – are written in gold letters above a door in the inn. He is greeted by two singing men who perform an impromptu rendition of a bit of verse that Wilhelm had composed while walking. That night Wilhelm is awoken by an unidentifiable sound; he does not, however, find anyone whom he can ask what it was. The following morning he is shaved by a barber who does not speak. To Wilhelm's great surprise, Lenardo – about whom Wilhelm had recently been thinking – appears at the inn along with Natalie's brother Friedrich. The chapter ends with very much singing.

Chapter Two: Letters from Hersilie to Wilhelm. The first letter scolds Wilhelm for not writing to her in a way that allows any dialogue to emerge: "... correspondence with you is completely like a monologue," she complains. In the second letter, she lets him know – in an excited and conspiratorial, secretive tone – that she has finally found the key to the box Felix found earlier in the novel. Felix's friend Fitz, she tells him, has gotten himself into trouble, and the authorities came asking for a jacket he had lost. Before handing it over, she unexplainably reached into the pocket of it, and found a key there that she immediately knew was the one to the box. Having quietly kept the key rather than giving it to the authorities who asked for the jacket, she is agitated and fearful: "the law and the courts are not to be joked with," she writes. She urges Wilhelm to come to her so that they can open the box together, and she tries to raise his curiosity to get him to come soon. Her letter includes an illustration of the key (the only visual element ever incorporated into any of Goethe's literary works). In a postscript she points out that it is actually Felix who found the box, and to whom it belongs, and that he should therefore be present for its opening, as well.

Chapter Three: Wilhelm does not heed Hersilie's request to come to her; he is not all that curious about the box and the key, and furthermore, having now mastered his medical calling, he is too busy tending to patients to leave at will. In a conversation with Lenardo and Friedrich, Wilhelm tells a story from his training in human anatomy: Due to an outbreak of crime that sought to capitalize on medical students' need for human corpses to dissect, laws had become increasingly strict about the acquisition of these. As Wilhelm hesitates one day to proceed with the dissection of an especially beautiful young woman's arm, a stranger approaches him and brings him to see a collection of artificial human body parts he has made. Though those in the medical profession look askance at the practice, the man believes that anatomy can be learned better by building models of the body than by dissecting real parts: "As you will shortly learn," he says to Wilhelm, "constructing teaches more than destructing, connecting teaches more than separating, reviving dead material teaches more than killing further what has already been killed. So then, do you want to be my student?" Wilhelm agrees, and proceeds to study with the man.

Chapter Four: Wilhelm having spoken in the previous chapter of his experiences as a medical student, Friedrich wishes to share with him his own talent: he has a precise memory and writes well, and with these talents was able to transcribe Wilhelm's story from the previous day virtually verbatim. In the conversation that ensues, the talents of various people are talked about, and Lenardo comes to speak of his own inclination for technical matters. He has been keeping a journal in which he records the technical details of industry and economy in the mountain regions, and offers this journal to Wilhelm to read that evening. "I don't want to claim that it is exactly pleasant to read," he concedes. "It always seemed to me entertaining and in a certain way instructive." The following chapter consists of excerpts from this journal.

Chapter Five: Consists of entries from Lenardo's journal regarding the rural textile industry in the mountains. After reading them, Wilhelm asks Lenardo for the continuation of the manuscripts, but is told that the rest of the text has been sent to Makarie. Instead of reading further, then, Wilhelm seeks to pass the evening in conversation.

Chapter Six: The barber whom Wilhelm met in the first chapter of Book Three – who did not speak – is now introduced to him as a master storyteller; the story he tells Wilhelm is "The New Melusine." A young man – indulgent both with money and with women – sets out on a long journey. At one of the first stops he intends to flatter the young woman cooking at an inn – both to get her attention, and in hopes she will lower the bill for his food. However, he is distracted by a beautiful and mysterious young woman who arrives at the inn just after he does. He falls passionately in love with her, but she tells that he will have to prove himself worthy of her by carrying out an enigmatic set of instructions: he must travel onward without her, and carry with him a small box that she gives him; this box must be kept in a separate room from the one he sleeps in. She gives him money for the trip, and he travels forth. Though he promptly gambles away the money and loses himself in the attentions of other women, she gives him another chance, and gives him a magically bottomless supply of gold for his expenses. Traveling by wagon one dark night, he notices a strange light. "I observed it and found that it was coming from inside the small box, which seemed to have a crack in it as if it had been split open by the hot and dry weather of the beginning summertime." Looking into the crack he sees inside the box the interior of a tiny, majestic, and ornate hall in which his loved one – in miniature – was sitting by a fireplace from which the light was coming. She later explains to him that she is from the kingdom of dwarves, who sent her to find a human to marry in order to replenish the threatened dwarf population. Their love almost comes to an end one night when, drunk and jealous, the young man betrays her secret by openly mocking her as a dwarf in front of others. He redeems himself to her, though, by agreeing to be shrunk to dwarf stature in order to remain with her. With time, though, he grows discontented with life among the dwarves – because the thought of marriage is odious to him, and also because of unease in his diminutive form – and cuts off the magic ring that had shrunk him from his natural size. Back among humans, he makes his way back to the cook at the inn whose attention he had hoped to get at the beginning of the story.

Chapter Seven: letter from Hersilie to Wilhelm

Chapter Eight: contains the story "The Risky Bet," which the narrator includes here in unedited form because, he explains, the tone of the novel is getting ever more serious, and so there won't be place for the inclusion of such "irregularities" later in the novel. A group of young men observe an older man "of lordly, austere appearance" but with a big nose arriving in a mountain village, and one of them offers a bet: "... what do you want to bet that I will tweak his nose without suffering any dire consequences for it? Indeed, I will even earn myself a gracious master in him by doing so." His friends bet him one Louisdor that this will not happen. Learning that the man wishes to have his beard shaved, the young man presents himself as a barber, and, in the course of the shave, pulls the man's nose conspicuously. At the end, he earns the man's praise for his skillful work, but is admonished for one thing: "One does not touch people of stature on the nose." His friends witness the deed, and the young man wins the bet. One of the friends, however, tells his lover of the bet; she tells a friend, and by evening the old man who was tricked hears about it. Enraged, he comes after the group with an axe, but they are able to escape. This slight to the noble old man's dignity hurts his pride, compromises his health over time, and is believed to be a contributing factor to his eventual death.

Chapter Nine: narration of Wilhelm's travels resumes

Chapter Ten: contains the short story "Not Too Far." A husband and children wait at the dinner table to celebrate the mother's birthday; she does not appear, and after waiting for hours, the husband, Odoard, storms restlessly out into the street. The absent woman, Albertine, is known to crave society and attention, especially from men, and has even been warned that this attribute of hers could put her marriage at risk. "I said it to her more than once," the family's servant reflects, "she shouldn't push things too far." (Hence the title of the story.) Odoard spends the evening in a room at a local inn, pacing and brooding. He asks the innkeeper not to let on to anyone that he is there, but when a company of women arrive at the same inn, and insist on meeting the unnamed guest – believing that it is an uncle of theirs – Odoard falls to the feet of one of the women, recognizing her as an old love. At home, meanwhile, Albertine finally arrives, explaining to the servant that there had been an accident; her coach had fallen into a ditch en route. (The servant tells her that Odoard was called away on business.) When the accident occurs, a gentleman, Lelio, who was riding with them, helps her friend Florine out of the overturned wagon, but leaves Albertine inside to be helped by the coachman and a servant. It soon becomes clear that there is an amorous affair between Lelio and Florine; from Albertine's feeling of shock and betrayal at this revelation, it becomes clear that she herself had been involved with Lelio. Once the coachman has gotten the wagon out of the ditch, the three are nonetheless forced to ride onward together, "and in hell itself there could not have been a group with more mutually repulsed feelings – traitors together with the betrayed – so tightly packed together."

Chapter Eleven: conversation regarding "that which genuinely holds people together: religion and custom." Christianity, time, police and authority, law, and the state are all discussed; the narrator relates only the "quintessence" of the conversation, however, rather than its entirety.

Chapter Twelve: Odoard speaks generally and abstractly about plans for building settlements, and about the roles of discipline and creative freedom in the arts.

Chapter Thirteen: three further entries from Lenardo's journal, telling of his observation of the yarn industry and of his conversation with a young woman named Gretchen, who tells of her past romantic attachment to an unnamed man. After this relationship ended, Gretchen kept a page composed by her ex-lover summarizing the ideas of certain conversations they had had together; Lenardo recognizes the handwriting as being Wilhelm's.

Chapter Fourteen: narration of Wilhelm's travels resumes

Chapter Fifteen: consists of a characterization of the character Makarie. This characterization, the narrator tells us, is taken from Makarie's own archive, but, as he also tells us, cannot necessarily be seen as "authentic." Makarie's unique nature and her relation to the solar system are described.

Chapter Sixteen: narration of Wilhelm's travels resumes

Chapter Seventeen: letter from Hersilie to Wilhelm telling of her encounter with his son Felix. Felix kisses her, but although the affection is mutual, she scolds him for doing so. Taking this rebuff to be a true reflection of her feelings, he takes offense and rides off on his horse.

Chapter Eighteen: close of the narration: By the side of a river, Wilhelm sees a horseman slip and fall into the water. Wilhelm saves him by helping bring him to land, and then opening one of his veins with a blade. The young man – Felix – comes to and embraces his father; the two stand together "like Castor and Pollux."

"From Makarie's Archive": collection of 182 aphorisms

Untitled poem: "In the austere charnelhouse..." (often referred to as "Upon Viewing Schiller's Skull," though this title is not from Goethe himself).

At the close of the poem it reads, "(To be continued.)"

== Characters of the novel ==
book and chapter of first appearance or mention given in parentheses:

- Wilhelm Meister (Note: Character appearing in Wilhelm Meister's Apprenticeship) (I,1)
- Felix (I,1)
- Natalie (I,1)
- Joseph (I,1)
- Marie (I,2)
- Fitz (I,3)
- Mountain/Jarno (I,3)
- Hersilie (I,5)
- Juliette (I,5)
- Lenardo (I,6)
- Makarie (I,6/7)
- Angela (I,10)
- the astronomer/mathematician (I,10)
- Valerine (I,6/11)
- Nachodine (I,11)
- the collector (I,12)
- the overseer of the Pedagogical Province (II, 1)
- the major (II, 2)
- the baroness (II, 2)
- Hilarie (II, 2)
- Flavio (II, 2)
- the "theatrical friend" (II, 2)
- the beautiful widow (II, 2)
- the Abbé (II, 6)
- the painter/singer (II, 7)
- Mignon (II, 7)
- St. Christoph (III, 1)
- the barber (III, 1)
- Friedrich (III, 1)
- the sculptor/plastic anatomist (III, 3)
- Lydie (III, 4)
- Philine (III, 4)
- Odoard (III, 10)
- Albertine (III, 10)
- Sopronie (III, 10)
- Florine (III, 10)
- Lelio (III, 10)
- Gretchen (III, 13)
- Lieschen (III, 13)
- Lothario (III, 14)
- Therese (III, 14)

== English editions of the novel ==
- Wilhelm Meister's Years of Travel or The Renunciants. Translated by H.M. Waidson. London and New York: John Calder and Riverrun Press. 1982 – via Internet Archive.; Oneworld Classics, 2012.
- Jane K. Brown, ed. (1995). Conversations of German Refugees, Wilhelm Meister's Journeyman Years: Or, the Renunciants (Goethe: The Collected Works, Vol. 10). Translated by Krishna Winston. Princeton, NJ: Princeton University Press. ISBN 9780691043456 – via Internet Archive.
- Goethe's Wilhelm Meister's Travels: Translation of the First Edition by Thomas Carlyle. Columbia, SC: Camden House, 1991.
- The Madwoman on a Pilgrimage. Andrew Piper, trans. London: Hesperus Press, 2009.
- The Man of Fifty. Andrew Piper, trans. London: Hesperus Press, 2004.
