= Minjona =

Latvian choir

Minjona Women's Choir
- Choir
- Origin: Riga, Latvia
- Founded: February 11, 1975 (age 50)
- Founder: University of Latvia
- Members: approximately 30
- Music director: Romāns Vanags
- Choirmaster: Evija Vanaga, Elīna Auziņa-Baiguševa
- Organist: Ilze Dzērve
- Chief conductor: Romāns Vanags
- Headquarters: Raiņa Boulevard 19, Riga, Latvia
- Affiliation: University of Latvia
- Awards: 9th top female choir of the world (2015)
- Website: www.minjona.lu.lv

Minjona is a women's choir based at the University of Latvia. The choir was founded in 1975 by artistic director Viesturs Gailis. In 1977, it was given the name "Minjona." In 2015, Minjona was named the 9th top women's choir in the world.

== History ==
Women's choir "Minjona" of the University of Latvia after the Latvian Song and Dance Festival competition, 2018.

=== Foundation ===
The first appearance of the choir occurred in 1974, when female students of the Pēteris Stučka Latvian State University were called to audition for a female choir. Viesturs Gailis, the founder of the new collective, was the first year student of Latvian State Conservatory and a son of Daumants Gallis who, at the time, was artistic director and chief conductor of the mixed choir "Juventus".

The two driving forces behind the formation of the women's choir were:

- an excess of women interested in singing with Juventus; and
- Gallis, a conducting student in his father's Conservatory class, wished to develop his own talents as a choral conductor.

The first audition took place on 24 December 1974, followed by the first rehearsal on 11 February 1975. Since then, the date of the first rehearsal is commemorated as the choir's anniversary.

The first public performance took place on 1 June 1975 in the Aula Magna of the University of Latvia during Childhood festivity. In May 1976, Minjona presented their first full concert. In Autumn 1975, the choir was called to Latvian Television to record their first sound and video record: the Latvian folk songs "Tumša nakte, zaļa zāle" and "Bēdu, manu lielu bēdu".

=== Name ===
On April 5, 1977 the choir was given a name – "Minjona", which was inspired by the character "Mignon" in Johann Wolfgang von Goethe’s work Wilhelm Meister's Apprenticeship [Wilhelm Meisters Lehrjahre]. The choice of name was inspired by Gailis' father, known as an interpreter of the music of Emīls Dārziņš. Dārziņš had composed a piece titled "Minjona" for mixed choir; Gailis adapted this music for women's choir to commemorate the naming of the choir. This song is based on one of Goethe's Songs of Mignon, the poem "Kennst du das Land, wo die Zitronen blühn?" This song became for many years an anthem of the choir.

== Creative directors and chief conductors ==
- 1975–1985 Viesturs Gailis
- 1985–1990 Aivars Gailis
- 1990–1992 Sigvards Kļava
- 1992–now Romāns Vanags

== Concert masters ==
- 1978–now Ilze Dzērve

== Awards ==
- 2000 – 1st place – XLVIII „Guido d'Arezzo” International Polyphonic Competition Arezzo (Italy)
- 2001 – 3rd place – XXX „Florilège Vocal de Tours” International choral competition (France)
- 2002 – 2nd place – XVII International Festival of Academic Choirs (Pardubice, Czech Republic)
- 2003– 4th place – Choir Wars of XXIII Latvian Song and XIII Dance Festival
- 2004 – 2nd place – XXI „Béla Bartók” International Choir Competition (Debrecen, Hungary)
- 2007 – 4th place –X International Choir Festival "Tallinn 2007" (Estonia)
- 2008 – 2nd place – Choir Wars of XXIV Latvian Song and XIV Dance Festival; diploma for best performance of mandatory song – Latvian folk song "Aunu, aunu balti kājas" (arranged by Imants Ramiņš)
- 2009 – 2nd place – XXXI International May Choir Competition „Prof. Georgi Dimitrov” (Varna, Bulgaria)
- 2012 – Platin Medal – I Xinghai Prize International Choir Championships (Guangzhou, China)
- 2013 – 3rd place – Choir Wars of XXV Latvian Song and XV Dance Festival; 8th place among female choirs of the world within INTERKULTUR World Rating.
- 2015 – 9th place among female choirs of the world within INTERKULTUR World Rating

== Nominations ==
- Latvian Grand Music Award 2013 in the category "Concert of the Year" – Minjona took part in the nominated concert of Latvian Song Festival dedicated to the 150th anniversary of the birth of composer Jāzeps Vītols in the ''Aula Magna'' of the University of Latvia
- Annual Latvian Music Recording Award „Academic music album 2005” for the album „Arvien vēl sirds” (2005).

== Discography ==
- Salve Regina (2001).
- Arvien vēl sirds (2005). Nominated to Annual Latvian Music Recording Award „Academic music album 2005”.
- O Salutaris Hostia (2009).

=== Participation in music recording ===
- Dziesmu svētki. Dziedot dzimu, dziedot augu (2008).
- XXIII Vispārējie Latviešu Dziesmu svētki. Sieviešu un vīru koru koncerts Teiksma par latvieti (2003).

== Dedications ==
=== Composers ===
- Branko Stark "Domine Dominus noster" Psalm 8 — dedicated to Romāns Vanags and the Minjona Women's Choir of the University of Latvia
- Aurelio Porfiri "Laudate Pueri Dominum" für Frauenchor und Orchester — dedicated to Romāns Vanags and his choir "Minjona"
- Juris Karlsons "Ora pro nobis..." sieviešu korim à capella (13.07.2011. Kalna Oļos) — dedicated to Romāns Vanags and his choir "Minjona"
- Antra Purviņa arrangement of "Jingle Bells" (Maurice Gardner arrangement) to the female choir — dedicated to the Minjona Women's Choir of the University of Latvia
- Zigmars Liepiņš arrangement of "Ķiršu lietus" (Zigmars Liepiņš, Alfrēds Krūklis) to the female choir (01.05.1995) — dedicated to the Minjona Women's Choir for harvest festivities
- Viesturs Gailis arrangement of "Minjona" (Emīls Dārziņš, Johann Wolfgang von Goethe) for women's choir (1977) — dedicated to the Minjona Women's Choir of the Pēteris Stučka Latvian State University

=== Poems ===
- Anna Rancāne — "Vēl pirms dziesmas kāda skaņa debesīs trīs" (1980) — dedicated to the Minjona Women's Choir of the Pēteris Stučka Latvian State University

=== Other ===
- Edīte Kaufmane — domestic plum "Minjona" (reg. No. PLU2) — "the first bred plum variety acquired its title due to the choir 'Minjona'"
