= Ernst Lebrecht Henneberg =

German mathematician

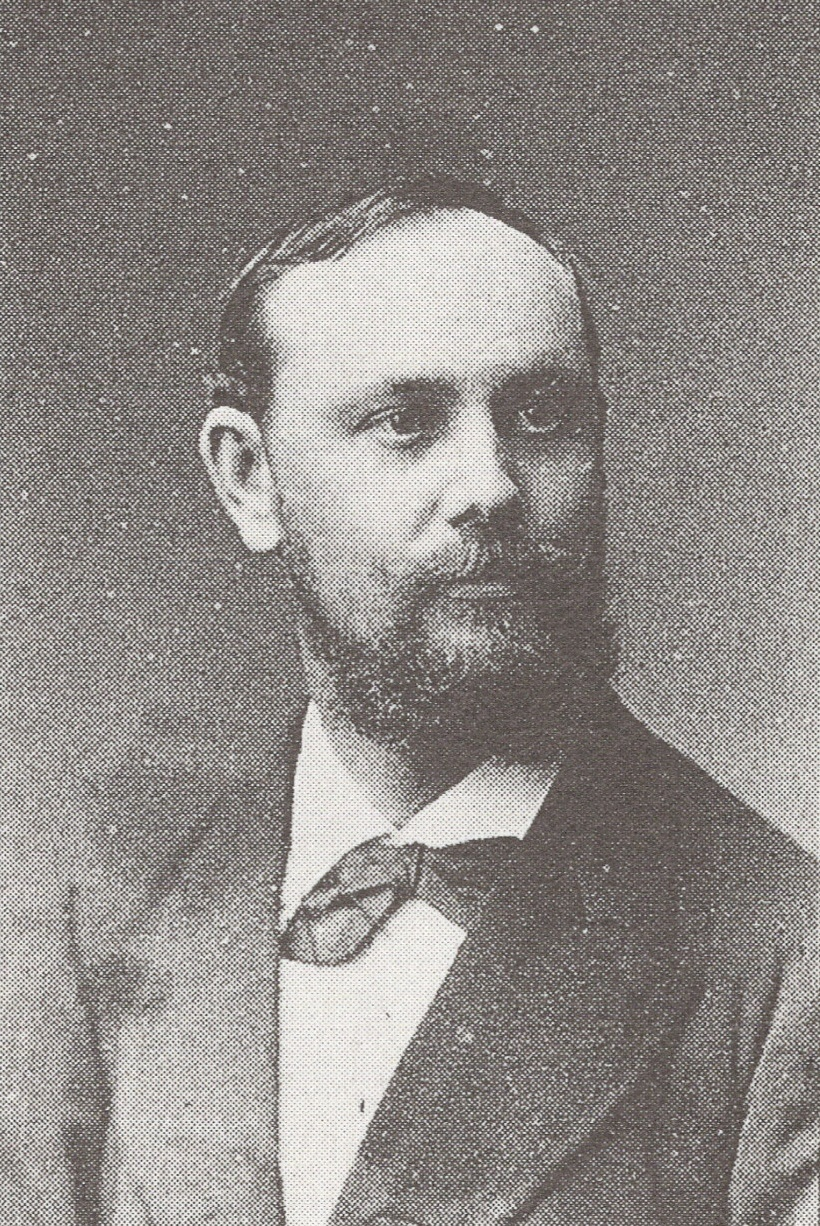
- Born: 27 September 1850
- Died: 29 April 1933 (aged 82)

Academic work
- Discipline: Mathematics
- Institutions: TU Darmstadt

Ernst Lebrecht Henneberg (27 September 1850 – 29 April 1933) was a German professor of mechanics and applied mathematics.

== Life ==
Ernst Lebrecht Henneberg was born in Wolfenbüttel in 1850 to Heinrich Henneberg and Sophie Rimpau. From 1870 until 1876 he studied mathematics in Zürich, Heidelberg, and Berlin, receiving his doctorate in 1875 from Hermann Schwarz while in Zürich. After living in Zürich from 1876 until 1878, he became an associate professor for descriptive and synthetic geometry and graphic statics at TU Darmstat. Not soon after in 1879, he became a professor of mechanics at the university.

From 1887 to 1890 Henneberg was the dean of the Electrical Engineering school at TU Darmstat. In 1888, Henneburg was elected as a member of the Leopoldina. By 1890, he was one of the founders of the German Association of Mathematicians. From 1890 to 1891 Henneberg had become the dean of the Mathematics and Sciences school, while also acting as the rector from 1891 to 1893.

In 1903 he went on to write an article on graph theory in the Encyclopedia of Mathematical Sciences. The Henneberg's method of bar conversion and the Henneberg minimum surface that he found in his dissertation are named after him.

During both 1902-1905 and 1911-14 he was Dean of the General Department, and on September 30, 1920, he retired from this position. In 1933, Ernst died a professor in the department of Mechanics at TU Darmstadt.

Henneberg was married to Pauline Grunewald; their daughter Paula married the geologist Werner Janensch.

== Honors ==
1892 November 25: Award of the Knight's Cross 1st Class of the Order of Merit of Philip the Magnanimous

1898 November 25: Appointment as Privy Councilor

1904 November 25 Award of the Cross of Honor of the Order of Merit of Philip the Magnanimous

1911: PhD of engineering at the Technical University of Braunschweig.

1917 March 13: Awarded the Commander's Cross II. Class of the Order of Merit of Philip the Magnanimous

1925: Honorary Senator at TH Darmstadt.

== Publications ==
- Statik der starren Systeme. (1886).
- Die graphische Statik der starren Systeme. (1911)

== Literature ==
Christa Wolf/Marianne Viefhaus: List of university teachers at the TH Darmstadt, Darmstadt 1977, p. 81.

Karl-Eugen Kurrer: History of structural engineering. In search of balance. Ernst & Sohn, Berlin 2016, pp. 644 and pp. 651–652, ISBN 978-3-433-03134-6.
