= Aksel Schiøtz =

Danish singer

Aksel Schiøtz (1 September 1906 – 19 April 1975) was a Danish tenor and later baritone, who was considered one of Europe's leading lieder singers of the post-World War II period. He worked as a voice teacher at several universities.

== Biography ==
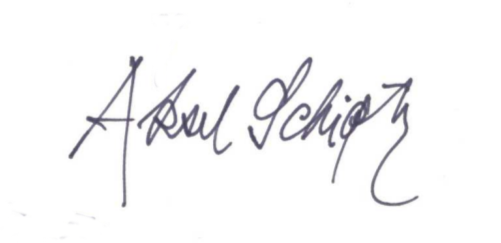
Schiøtz’s signature, 1951

Schiøtz was born in Roskilde, Denmark, but grew up in Hellerup near Copenhagen. He studied singing with John Forsell. Having obtained an M.A. in Danish and English in 1930, he taught at various schools in Roskilde and Copenhagen until 1938, when he gave up teaching. In October 1936, he gave his first lieder recital, and he made his opera début at the Royal Danish Theatre, Copenhagen, in Mozart's Così fan tutte in 1939. In 1940, he made a legendary recording of the tenor aria from Handel's Messiah.

In 1946, he underwent an operation for tumor acousticus. In Our Schubert, David Schroeder writes that the surgery "should have put an end to his career in 1945, since it left him paralyzed on one side of his face and neck; but with the encouragement of friends and loved ones he relearned how to sing, becoming a baritone instead of a tenor." His wife Gerd particularly motivated him.

At the Glyndebourne Festival in 1946, he alternated with Peter Pears in the part of 'Male Chorus' in Britten's The Rape of Lucretia. More than as an opera singer, however, Schiøtz is remembered for his interpretation of Danish songs and Schubert's and Schumann's lieder, as well as songs by Carl Michael Bellman. During the Nazi occupation of Denmark (1940–1945), he achieved great popularity for his recording of traditional Danish songs of the 19th and early 20th centuries. During the occupation there was a strong rise in Danish nationalism. Aksel Schiøtz's lyrical and sensitive interpretation of Danish songs and his perfect command of the Danish language resulted in an everlasting gift to the Danish people.

From 1955 to 1958 he served as professor of vocal music at the University of Minnesota, Minneapolis, later in Toronto by invitation of Boyd Neel, and finally at the University of Colorado, Boulder. From 1968 he was professor in Copenhagen. After retiring, he wrote The Singer and His Art (Hamish Hamilton, 1971).

Schiøtz died in Copenhagen in 1975, aged 68, and is buried in the churchyard of the Raabjerg Church, near Skiveren, Denmark, with his wife Gerd.
