= Henneberg surface =

Non-orientable minimal surface

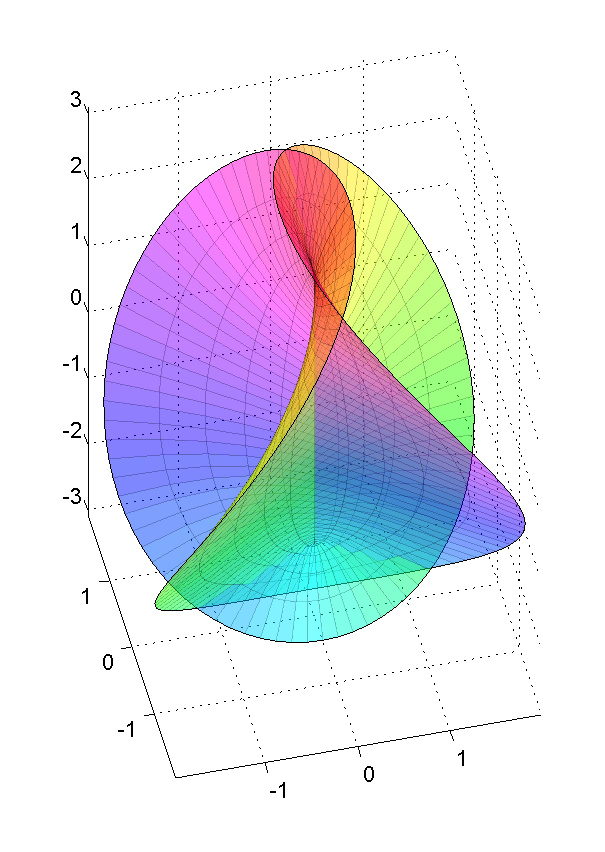
Henneberg surface.

In differential geometry, the Henneberg surface is a non-orientable minimal surface named after Lebrecht Henneberg.

It has parametric equation

$$\begin{align}
x(u,v) &= 2\cos(v)\sinh(u) - (2/3)\cos(3v)\sinh(3u)\\
y(u,v) &= 2\sin(v)\sinh(u) + (2/3)\sin(3v)\sinh(3u)\\
z(u,v) &= 2\cos(2v)\cosh(2u)
\end{align}$$

and can be expressed as an order-15 algebraic surface. It can be viewed as an immersion of a punctured projective plane. Up until 1981 it was the only known non-orientable minimal surface.

The surface contains a semicubical parabola ("Neile's parabola") and can be derived from solving the corresponding Björling problem.
