= Björlin =

Björlin is a surname. Notable people with the surname include:

- Nadia Bjorlin (born 1980), American actress, singer and model
- Risto Björlin (born 1944), Finnish sport wrestler
- Ulf Björlin (1933–1993), Swedish composer and conductor

== See also ==
- Björling
