= Wilhelm Meister's Apprenticeship =

1795/96 Novel by Johann Wolfgang von Goethe

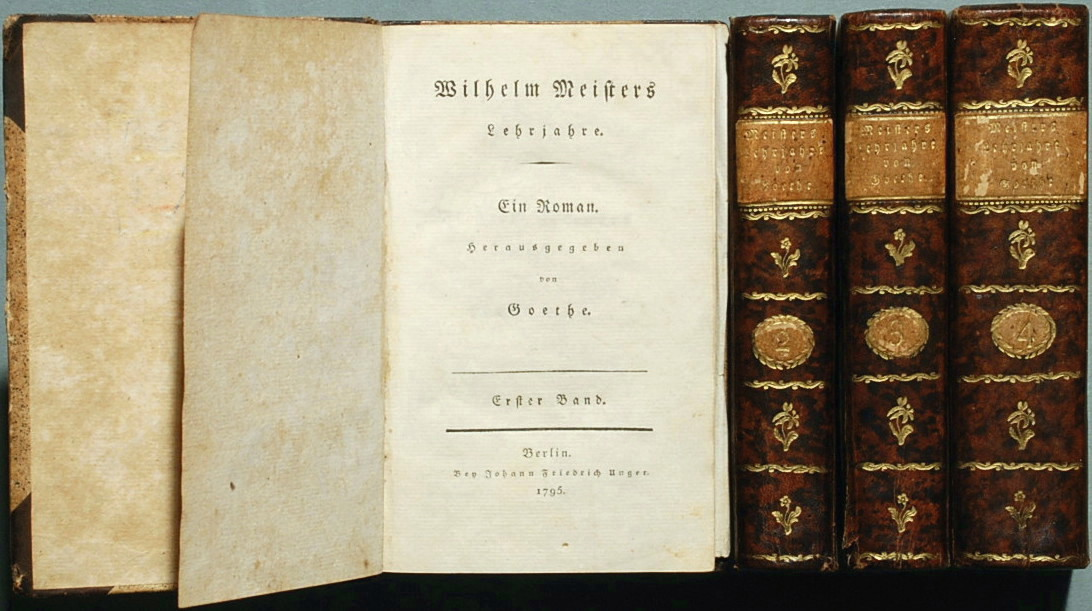
- Title page of first edition
- Author: Johann Wolfgang von Goethe
- Original title: Wilhelm Meisters Lehrjahre
- Language: German
- Genre: Philosophical novel
- Publisher: Johann Friedrich Unger (Berlin)
- Publication date: 1795–1796
- Followed by: Wilhelm Meister's Journeyman Years (Wilhelm Meisters Wanderjahre) (1821–1829)

Wilhelm Meister's Apprenticeship (German: Wilhelm Meisters Lehrjahre) is the second novel by Johann Wolfgang von Goethe. It is a Bildungsroman, or coming-of-age story, published in 1795–96. It consists of eight books, the first five of which are based on the fragment Wilhelm Meister's Theatrical Mission, which remained unpublished during Goethe's lifetime. A comparison of the two texts reveals numerous verbatim similarities. The sequel, Wilhelm Meister's Journeyman Years, was published in two volumes in 1821 and 1829, respectively.

== Plot ==
The novel is in eight books. The main character Wilhelm Meister undergoes a journey of self-realization. The story centers upon Wilhelm's attempt to escape what he views as the empty life of a bourgeois businessman. After a failed romance with the theater, Wilhelm commits himself to the mysterious Tower Society.

=== Book One ===
The housekeeper Barbara is waiting for her mistress, the actress Mariane, to return from her performance at the theater. When she arrives, Mariane ignores the presents from her suitor, Norberg, who is due to arrive in 14 days. Wilhelm, whom she loves despite his poor prospects, arrives, and they embrace. The next morning Wilhelm argues with his mother about his obsession with the theater. They reminisce about the puppet show that his mother put on twelve years prior at Christmas. On account of the play (David & Goliath) Wilhelm became entranced by the theater. He asks his mother where his old puppets are, wanting to show them to a friend.

One night Wilhelm brings his box of puppets to show Mariane and Barbara. They spend the evening listening to Wilhelm tell stories about the aforementioned puppet show. The young soldier who had constructed the theater and put on the play persuades Wilhelm's father to a repeat performance. After this show Wilhelm gets curious and peeks under the curtain.

"...these mysteries disturbed me so much that I wanted to be both among the enchanted and the enchanters, somehow secretly to have a hand in it, and at the same time, as a spectator, be able to enjoy the pleasure of the illusion." (Trans. Blackall & Lange, 1989)

One Sunday morning Wilhelm sneaks into the pantry and finds the box of puppets. He steals the playbook of David and Goliath. He reads it over and over, memorizing all the parts, performing it for his parents until he has an opportunity to help the lieutenant with another performance. During the performance, Wilhelm drops his Jonathan puppet, but otherwise performs his parts well. In the coming spring Wilhelm practices with siblings, friends, and by himself. He finds Gottsched's “The German Stage,” which he begins to practice—preferring always the fifth acts. Mariane is getting sleepy, but Wilhelm is blissfully unaware. He asks of her childhood, but Barbara suggests that he continue his own story (of the theater). Wilhelm begins acting with friends and wishes to do a rendition of Tasso's Jerusalem Delivered. The friends struggle to furnish their play with the necessary materials, and on the night of the performance they realize that no one has any lines planned. After one aborted attempt, they decide to play David and Goliath (from the earlier puppet shows).

By this point Mariane has fallen asleep, but Wilhelm continues his story, this time about how he and his friends attempted to turn all manner of novels, stories, and histories into plays. By the time he was fourteen he was being groomed for a job in commerce, which his adolescent heart couldn't bear. He composed a poem where the Muse of Tragedy vied with a figure of Commerce. Wilhelm is so inspired in his speech that he wakes Mariane up.

Wilhelm later arrives at the house of his father's business associate—only to hear that the man's daughter has run away with an actor. An uncomfortable Wilhelm stays the night and, after setting out the next morning, sees a wagon bringing the pair of lovers back to town. Wilhelm goes to the courthouse and hears their confessions of love, which inspires him to act as their mediator. Wilhelm talks with Melina (the young male lover) alone and is dismayed to hear that he wants to leave the theater. Nevertheless, he offers to try and convince the girl's parents to find him a job in the village. Wilhelm fails to secure him a position, and the pair of lovers must leave in a few days.

On his way home Wilhelm recollects his initial romance with Mariane. When he arrives, Werner tries to talk him out of the relationship. Ill at ease, Wilhelm writes to Mariane, detailing his plans to start their new life together.

Wilhelm finds Mariane in a strange mood and decides to hold on to the letter; she tells him not to return that night. He wanders the streets and meets a stranger who reveals his knowledge of Wilhelm's grandfather's art collection, which was sold in Wilhelm's childhood. Wilhelm returns to Mariane's, and as he waits outside he sees a dark figure emerge from her door. At home he takes out Mariane's scarf; a concealed note, written by Mariane's other suitor, falls out.

=== Book Two ===
Over the next couple years Wilhelm occupies himself with business affairs and agonizes over what happened with Mariane. Werner stokes his anger toward Mariane, but on one occasion attempts to stop Wilhelm from burning all of his old keepsakes and theater manuscripts.

While on another business trip, Wilhelm hears there will be a play put on by factory workers in the small village of Hochdorf; he decides to attend. After more strenuous travels he finally rests in a town where he has no business to conduct. In the town are a traveling group of acrobats and the remnants of a theater troupe. The former includes the androgynous child Mignon, whom Wilhelm buys from the cruel manager of the troupe at the end of the chapter; the latter includes Philine and Laertes, whom Wilhelm befriends and dines with over the next few days. He takes time to watch the performances of the acrobats.

After having disappeared Mignon returns and acts as Wilhelm's servant. He stays in town, practicing his fencing and dancing, until Melina and Madam Melina appear, looking for work. Although they do not get along well with Philine and Laertes, Melina plans to start a new theater company, with Wilhelm footing the bill for scenery and costumes. Wilhelm begins to regret staying so long in the town. Four newcomers arrive in town; one of whom is an “oldish man,” whom Wilhelm recognized from performances with Mariane. Wilhelm finds out from him that three years ago Mariane became pregnant and had been dismissed from her theater company. Still reeling from the news, Wilhelm returns to his room, where Mignon performs her egg dance for him. He is so moved by it that he realizes his wish to take her as his own child.

The next day the whole troupe takes a boat down the river to a new lunch spot. While extemporizing a play, they are joined by a “clergyman,” who later talks to Wilhelm privately about fate, education, and acting.

"'But,' said Wilhelm, 'shouldn't natural talent be all that an actor...needs to enable him to reach the high goal he has set himself?' 'That should certainly be, and continue to be, the alpha and omega, beginning and end; but in between he will be deficient if he does not somehow cultivate what he has, and what he is to be, and that quite early on. It could be that those considered geniuses are worse off than those with ordinary abilities, for a genius can more easily than ordinary men be distorted and go astray.'" (Trans. Blackall & Lange, 1989)

The clergyman disappears, and when the friends return to the inn they get inebriated on punch while performing an impromptu play set in the German Middle Ages. Dispirited by the damage caused by them, Wilhelm covers the costs the next morning. At dinner a harper appears, who sings ballads and lifts everyone's spirits. His appearance turns their conversation once again to the purchase of theater props and costumes. Upset by the conversation, Wilhelm goes to sit alone. Philine joins him and embarrasses him with public caresses before leaving. Wilhelm goes after her and runs into Melina, with whom he makes amends. Wilhelm offers to buy the theater equipment. Philine's former serving boy, Friedrich, who has just returned, beats Wilhelm to Philine's room. Wilhelm, returning home and ignoring Mignon, overhears a horseman say that shortly a count and a prince will be arriving at the neighboring estate. By this point Wilhelm is so distraught that he seeks out the harper, who comforts him with serenades late into the night.

Wilhelm feels he needs a definite goal. He approves Melina's purchase of the theater equipment with a notary. That evening Friedrich has an outburst about Philine's rendezvous with the stablemaster, which is settled amicably. Wilhelm returns to his room; in the midst of his indecision Mignon enters. When Wilhelm talks about leaving she starts having convulsions and heart pains. The two commit themselves to each other—as father and child.

=== Book Three ===
The following morning Mignon enters Wilhelm's room, singing a song for the zither (“Kennst du das Land?”), which reveals clues about her background. Meanwhile, the count and countess arrive. They meet the entire troupe and agree to hire them on at their castle. Several days later the count sends a baron to settle their contracts. Himself a connoisseur of the German theater, the baron reads his own five-act composition, and the troupe agrees to perform it. Carriages arrive to take the troupe to the castle. They are unable to stop at an inn on the way for want of space. With the bustle around the castle and the heavy rain, they are sent round to the old, unfurnished portion, where no one is waiting to welcome them—the baron had injured himself during the ride. Completely drenched and hungry, they do not receive food and proper furnishings until long past midnight. The count arrives early the next morning, apologizing profusely for their treatment. Wilhelm lays curious eyes on Jarno, a mysterious officer who is known to be the prince's favorite. Melina struggles to keep the troupe behaved in their new accommodations, but rehearsals begin shortly.

Wilhelm has the chance to perform for the countess one morning. The baroness and Philine are also present, and the busyness of the day keeps him from his recitation. Although disappointed, Wilhelm receives a couple tokens from the countess. Melina tells Wilhelm that they are to prepare a prologue to perform for the prince at his arrival, which Wilhelm writes the next day. However, his piece clashes with the count's vision, and that evening he meets secretly with the countess and baroness to enlist their help. Wilhelm meets the count for breakfast, and they brainstorm the use of an allegorical Minerva for the prologue. During the rehearsal all the nobles and Jarno work to keep the count satisfied and distracted. The prince arrives, and the prologue goes over well. As the troupe continues to perform daily, those whom Wilhelm respects begin to absent themselves more and more. One day Wilhelm tries to engage the prince in conversation about French drama, but he is roundly ignored. Jarno, who has been slowly encouraging Wilhelm to dissociate himself from the rest of the troupe, recommends he read Shakespeare.

"And in a very short while, he was seized, as one would expect, by the torrent of a great genius which swept toward a limitless ocean in which he completely lost and forgot his own self." (Trans. Blackall & Lange, 1989)

The troupe starts to unravel as a disparaging poem about the baron circulates. The pedant, who is thought by some to be the anonymous author, is ambushed and beaten one night. During this time Wilhelm keeps himself above the fray and occupies himself Shakespeare, intervening only when Friedrich arrives at the castle and is thought to be an intruder.

When one day the count rides off to hunt, the baroness and Philine come up with a scheme to bring Wilhelm and the countess together. In the evening Wilhelm disguises himself as the count, and the ladies prepare her for a surprise encounter. The count returns unexpectedly early, however, and sees a disguised Wilhelm sitting in his chair. What the count understands to have happened is left ambiguous, but he becomes quiet and brooding. Later on he asks Wilhelm to read to him. Wilhelm seeks out Jarno to talk about his infatuation with Shakespeare. Jarno tries to persuade Wilhelm to give up acting for the “active life.” The conversation turns sour, however, when Jarno disparages the harper and Mignon. Wilhelm recommits himself to the latter and regrets ever having listened to Jarno. The count continues acting in his strange new manner, as the baroness and Jarno work to reinforce it. The army, prince, and count all intend to move on. Before their departure Wilhelm receives a ring from the countess and notices his initials on her bracelet—which she denies are his. They share a kiss and embrace before the countess screams and they separate.

=== Book Four ===
Mignon reminds Wilhelm of his obligation to his family. He writes to them after having grudgingly accepted a purse of money from the count via the baron. The troupe prepares to travel on, and Wilhelm has to convince the harper, who believes he is being pursued by an inexorable fate, to stay with them. In their travels Wilhelm takes inspiration from Shakespeare's Prince Hal and adjusts his own manner and costume. When the troupe begins to mock their previous patrons Wilhelm rebukes them and gives a speech on the upper and lower classes. Inspired by the speech, Philine suggests they perform an entire play right on the spot. Everyone is satisfied, and after Wilhelm comments on the relation of orchestral music and the theater, the troupe takes on a new republican form of governance—electing Wilhelm as their first director. Wilhelm takes the opportunity to deliver an exegesis on the character, Hamlet. He advocates a studious approach of the entire text in order to reconcile contradictions and penetrate into the author's mind.

Before they set out, Philine explains to Wilhelm why Laertes is so bitter towards women. The townsfolk warn their troupe of armed partisans spotted along the route they will take. The rest wish to reroute, but Wilhelm persuades them otherwise, and they set out. Finding a wooded hilltop, they break from their journey. The troupe eats and drinks; Wilhelm and Laertes rehearse a sword fight. Suddenly an armed band attacks. After putting up some resistance, Wilhelm falls unconscious after being shot. He wakes up in Philine's lap with Mignon keeping watch. Everyone else is safe and in town; the harper has gone to fetch a surgeon. Night is approaching when the three hear horses. An “Amazon” with a whole company of attendants is riding up. There is a surgeon with them, who extracts the bullets while the Amazon gives Wilhelm her coat. The impression of her beauty has an extreme effect on Wilhelm as he slips back into unconsciousness.

By the time Wilhelm comes to, the harper has arrived with help. The others are sheltered in an inn, and they try to bar access to Wilhelm and Philine. Having lost their possessions—all except Philine—they vent their anger at Wilhelm. Wilhelm rebukes them all and, as news arrives that Madame Melina's baby was stillborn, he promises to not abandon them until he has found a way to repay them. One of the Amazon's men arranged for Wilhelm and Philine, the “married couple,” to stay with a village pastor. Philine ingratiates herself to the hosts while looking after Wilhelm. During his convalescence, Wilhelm replays the encounter with the Amazon in his head over and over. Eventually all the actors come to visit. Laertes asks for a letter of recommendation to join Serlo's troupe. Wilhelm and Philine have several spats about the money he is spending on others, and she leaves in the night. Before going to see Serlo himself, Wilhelm sends the harper to inquire about the Amazon. No information is discovered, but Wilhelm notes a similarity between his Amazon and the countess. He constantly rebukes himself for how he let the troupe down and sets off to join them.

Wilhelm arrives and hears from Serlo that the actors have proven disappointing. Aurelie takes Wilhelm to the adjoining room and asks for his thoughts on Ophelia. Midway through, she bursts into tears. Serlo enters with Philine, and when the brother and sister absent themselves, Philine shares hints about Aurelie's unrequited love and her 3-year-old son. Wilhelm spends the next few evenings watching Serlo's impressive troupe perform, and Philine tries to flatter him into acting. Aurelie takes Wilhelm aside one day and begins to reveal her past. Serlo comes in and Wilhelm attempts to justify the overall plan of Hamlet. Wilhelm and Aurelie resume their discussion of Ophelia's part when Serlo snatches a dagger from Aurelie's table—which she wrestles away from him. Aurelie compliments Wilhelm on his poetic insight, yet criticizes his lack of judgment about people. She picks up her life story, which involves a deceased husband, who was Serlo's partner in the theater, and a more recent lover, Lothario, who reinvigorated her hope for the German public and nation. Wilhelm finally decides to pick up the letters from his father and Werner. Wilhelm is relieved at their mild tone and writes back, promising a detailed travelogue, for which he enlists the help of Laertes. We learn of Serlo's background: a harsh childhood and early talent for mimicry as well as theatrical roles at a monastery, in a community called the “Children of Joy,” and solo. Serlo offers to take the actors on permanently if Wilhelm himself agrees to act. He is unable to make a decision between joining Serlo's outfit or resuming his business activities.

Still undecided, he pays a visit to Aurelie, who is totally beside herself on account of the love she feels toward her “Lothario.” Wilhelm makes a vow to never again confess love to any woman to whom he will not devote his entire life. Aurelie pulls out a dagger and slashes his hand.

=== Book Five ===
Aurelie's restlessness affects others, like Felix, who has picked up a number of bad habits (e.g. drinking out of the bottle rather than a glass); Mignon begins to care for him more and more. Wilhelm, pleased with Serlo's decision to put together a musical group composed of the harper, Mignon, and Laertes, is shattered when he receives news of his father's death. He is unable to decide his next step, and feels pressure on all sides, when he receives a letter from Werner, the contents of which are: Werner is marrying his sister, and they, along with Wilhelm's mother, will move into Werner's family's house.

In order to perform Hamlet, Serlo demands that Wilhelm modify the play. Although reluctant, Wilhelm takes some time and decides to simplify the “external circumstances” of the plot. Wilhelm shares his changes with the group; they are satisfied and divide roles. Some roles still need to be filled. The prompter is to take the Pyrrhus passage. Wilhelm decides to leave the Ghost's role open after receiving a mysterious note one evening:

"We know full well, o wondrous youth, that you are in a serious predicament. You can hardly find enough living persons for your Hamlet, let alone ghosts....We cannot perform miracles, but...if you have confidence in us, the Ghost will appear at the appointed hour. Take courage, and be not afraid. A reply is not necessary, we will be informed of your decision." (Trans. Blackall & Lange, 1989)

At the first full rehearsal two devotees of the theater arrive. They observe and give Wilhelm and the others plenty of useful advice. Serlo and Wilhelm iron out a few issues—e.g. the two portraits and Hamlet's death. On the evening before the performance there is still no Ghost, but Wilhelm has faith in his appearance. Aurelie takes Wilhelm aside and disparages Philine. Not giving in, Wilhelm retires to his room, where he finds Philine's slippers but no Philine. He has trouble falling asleep. The next day passes swiftly, and during the overture someone announces that the Ghost has arrived—which Wilhelm had completely forgotten about. The performance is a success.

Wilhelm awakens in a blur, unaware of the identity of a midnight visitor, a spirit who kissed him in his sleep. In daily preparations the company has lost interest in Hamlet. That evening there is a fire. During the commotion, Mignon saves Felix from the bizarre, threatening actions of the harper. No one is hurt, and Wilhelm spends the night outside. They perform the play again the next day.

Wilhelm and the children set up house in the pavilion, and one night Wilhelm forcibly keeps the harper from escaping. The harper is put into the care of a country pastor. Wilhelm grows more frustrated with the audience's uncultured responses to Hamlet. One evening he spies an unknown guest, dressed as an officer, in Philine's room. He believes it to be Mariane, but Laertes guesses it is Friedrich. The two abscond during the night, and Wilhelm has them followed. The company faces growing challenges and friction. New actors arrive, Serlo and the others cannot agree about their repertoire. Wilhelm visits the country pastor and harper, and he finds the latter much improved. Serlo and Melina become close partners and begin pushing Wilhelm out. During preparations for Lessing's Emilia Galotti, Aurelie's condition worsens. Wilhelm cares for her and reads a manuscript, “Confessions of a Beautiful Soul,” which the same doctor from earlier in the story brings him. After she dies, Wilhelm leaves the troupe, delivering a letter to her faithless lover.

=== Book Six ===
Wilhelm reads a manuscript given to him by the Abbé, entitled *Confessions of a Beautiful Soul*. It is the spiritual autobiography of a woman (later revealed to be the aunt of Natalie and Lothario) who, after a life marked by illness, religious seeking, and moral introspection, finds peace through a deeply personal, pietistic form of Protestant Christianity. The confessions emphasize inner purity, renunciation of worldly vanities, and a direct relationship with God. Deeply moved by the text, Wilhelm reflects on his own life and spiritual state. Meanwhile, he continues his association with the theater company under Serlo, but his commitment to the stage begins to wane as he grapples with larger questions of personal development and moral purpose.

=== Book Seven ===
Wilhelm becomes more closely acquainted with the members of the Tower Society, a secret organization dedicated to the moral and practical education of its members. He meets Lothario, Jarno, and the Abbé, who reveal that they have been subtly guiding his development for years. Wilhelm learns that Felix is indeed his son by Mariane, who died in poverty after he abandoned her. Overcome with emotion, Wilhelm accepts responsibility for the child. The Tower Society explains its philosophy: true self-realization comes not through art or solitary striving, but through active engagement in the world, renunciation of selfish desires, and service to a greater whole. Wilhelm agrees to join their ranks and begins to envision a new life grounded in practical activity and ethical responsibility rather than theatrical illusion.

=== Book Eight ===
Wilhelm travels with Felix to the estate of Lothario, where he is reunited with Natalie, with whom he falls deeply in love. He gradually integrates into the circle of the Tower Society and learns more about their methods of education and social reform. The novel culminates in several marriages and reconciliations: Wilhelm and Natalie become engaged, and other characters resolve their personal entanglements. Wilhelm renounces his former theatrical ambitions, recognizing that his true “apprenticeship” has been the formation of his character through experience, error, and guidance. The book ends on a note of harmonious resolution, with Wilhelm prepared to enter a life of purposeful activity, fatherhood, and moral commitment within the framework of the Tower Society.

== Shakespeare motif ==
Wilhelm Meister's Apprenticeship depicts the eighteenth-century German reception of William Shakespeare's dramas: the protagonist is introduced to these by the character Jarno, and extensive discussion of Shakespeare's work occurs within the novel's dialogues. Wilhelm and his theater group give a production of Hamlet, in which Wilhelm plays the lead role. Shakespeare's work had begun to be translated into German in the 1740s, and had attained tremendous popularity and influence in Germany by the end of the century. A young Goethe had presided over and given a speech in celebration of Shakespeare's genius on October 14, 1771, in Frankfurt. A second simultaneous celebration was held in Strasbourg. Goethe has Shakespeare play a prominent role in Wilhelm's growth with the theater group as he "rejoiced the more that his name was Wilhelm" and acknowledges Shakespeare as a namesake, friend, and godfather.

== Characters ==
- Wilhelm
- Mariane - young actress; Felix's mother; Wilhelm leaves the pregnant Mariane because he did not know she broke off her relationship with Norberg.
- Barbara - Mariane's housekeeper
- Norberg - businessman and suitor of Mariane
- Werner - businessman and Wilhelm's future brother-in-law
- Melina - actor who leads the troupe for a time
- Madame Melina - wife of Melina and actress
- Mignon - the daughter of Sperata and Augustin
- The Harper (Augustin) - the father of Mignon, as well as the brother of Sperata
- Laertes - member of the theater troupe and friend to Wilhelm
- Philine - actress in Wilhelm's troupe
- The Abbé - member of the Tower Society
- Prince - lover of French Theater
- Baron - Count puts him in charge of Melina's theater troupe
- Count - hires Melina's theater troupe and houses them in his castle
- Countess - sister of Natalie, Lothario, and Friedrich
- Jarno - officer; member of the Tower Society and future husband of Lydie
- Doctor - in the service of Lothario's family
- Lydie - Lothario's former lover; Jarno's fiancée
- Therese - Lothario's future wife
- Aurelie - actress and Serlo's sister
- The Beautiful Soul - author of the "Confessions of a Beautiful Soul" [Bekenntnisse einer schönen Seele] (Book VI); aunt of Natalie, Lothario, Friedrich, and the Countess.
- Felix - son of Wilhelm and Mariane
- Serlo - theater director
- Friedrich - member of the Tower Society; brother to Natalie, Lothario, and the Countess
- Lothario - member of the Tower Society; brother to Natalie, the Countess, and Friedrich
- Natalie - Wilhelm's "beautiful Amazon" and future wife; sister to Lothario, Friedrich, and the Countess
- Sperata - Mignon's mother and sister to Augustin ("the Harper")
- Marchese Cipriani - Mignon's uncle and Augustin's brother; from Italy

== Origins ==
Goethe's work on the novel began in the 1770s. An early version of the work, unpublished during Goethe's lifetime, was discovered in the early twentieth century, and published under the title Wilhelm Meister's Theatrical Calling (Wilhelm Meisters theatralische Sendung). When the Apprenticeship was completed in the mid-1790s, it was to a great extent through the encouragement and criticism of Goethe's close friend and collaborator Friedrich Schiller that it took its final shape. Wilhelm Meisters Wanderjahre ("Wilhelm Meister's Journeyman Years" or Wilhelm Meister's Travels), the sequel to the Apprenticeship, was already planned in the 1790s, but did not appear in its first edition until 1821, and in its final form until 1829.

== Genre ==
Further books patterned after this novel have been called Bildungsroman ("novels of formation"), despite the fact that Wilhelm's "Bildung" ("education", or "formation of character") is ironized by the narrator at many points.

According to Andrew Crumey, "while Wilhelm Meister’s Apprenticeship is billed as the classic coming-of-age tale, or Bildungsroman, it’s really far more than that: a story of education and disillusionment, a novel of ideas ranging across literature, philosophy and politics, a masterpiece that resists all pigeonholing."

The novel could also be described as an example of what Graham Wolfe has called "theatre-fiction".

== Legacy ==
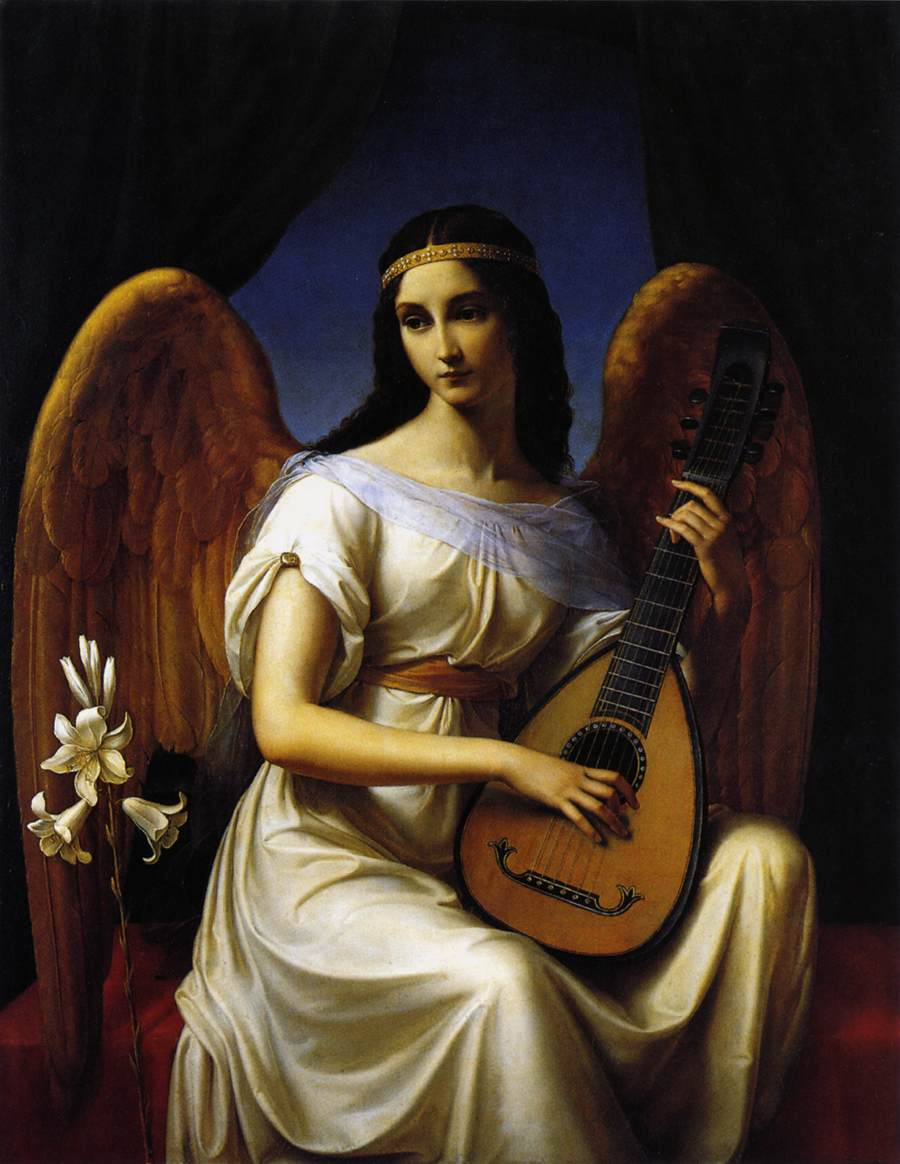
Schadow's Mignon (1828)

The novel has had a significant impact on European literature and philosophy. Romantic critic and theorist Friedrich Schlegel judged it to be of comparable importance for its age to the French Revolution and the philosophy of Johann Gottlieb Fichte; and Schopenhauer cited Wilhelm Meister's Apprenticeship as one of the four immortal romances. He says of the book in his Aphorismen zur Lebensweisheit: "where we were looking for pleasure, happiness and joy, we often find instruction, insight and knowledge, a lasting and real benefit in place of a fleeting one. This idea runs like a bass-note through Goethe's Wilhelm Meister; for this is an intellectual novel and is of a higher order than the rest."

Wilhelm Meister's Apprenticeship, being a seminal work of Romantic literature, has provided the text for many Romantic Lieder. Beethoven composed his Sehnsucht: Gedicht von Goethe viermal in Musik gesetzt von L. van Beethoven, WoO. 134, four settings of "Nur wer die Sehnsucht kennt", in 1808. Likewise Franz Schubert set eight poems from the novel, several more than once. His Gesänge aus Wilhelm Meister, Op. 62, are a well-known effort dating from 1826. Robert Schumann felt special affection for the novel and set "Kennst du das Land" from book in his Lieder-Album für die Jugend, Op. 79. In 1849 he composed a cycle, the Lieder und Gesänge aus Wilhelm Meister, Op. 98a, taking that same song as its first and additionally setting all but one of the rest of the novel's poems. The same year he completed the Requiem for Mignon, Op. 98b, not a true requiem but a tragic choral work with orchestra setting the passage in book 8 which describes Mignon's funeral. The two share an Opus number.

The work exerted an influence over musicians into the later part of the nineteenth century, especially because of its pedigree of settings by earlier Romantics. Ambroise Thomas's opera Mignon, composed in 1866, was based upon the novel, and Tchaikovsky's Op. 6 Romances, from three years later, contain the song "None but the Lonely Heart", setting a translation into Russian of Wilhelm Meister's "Nur wer die Sehnsucht kennt". Other later composers to set poems from the novel as Lieder include Wolf, Medtner, Reisenauer and Damrosch. Minjona, a contemporary women's choir based at the University of Latvia, is dedicated to Wilhelm Meister's Apprenticeship.

The novel has given rise to many pieces of visual art. Mignon, a tragic character who has particularly captivated artists, is the subject of famous paintings by Schadow and Bouguereau; Scheffer's Mignon desires her fatherland is also well-known. Two films with the name "Mignon", hailing from 1915 and 1922, were based upon the novel, as well as several television films. But the best-known screen version is Wim Wenders's The Wrong Move, a free adaptation with screenplay by Peter Handke and starring Rüdiger Vogler.
