= John Forsell =

Swedish opera singer

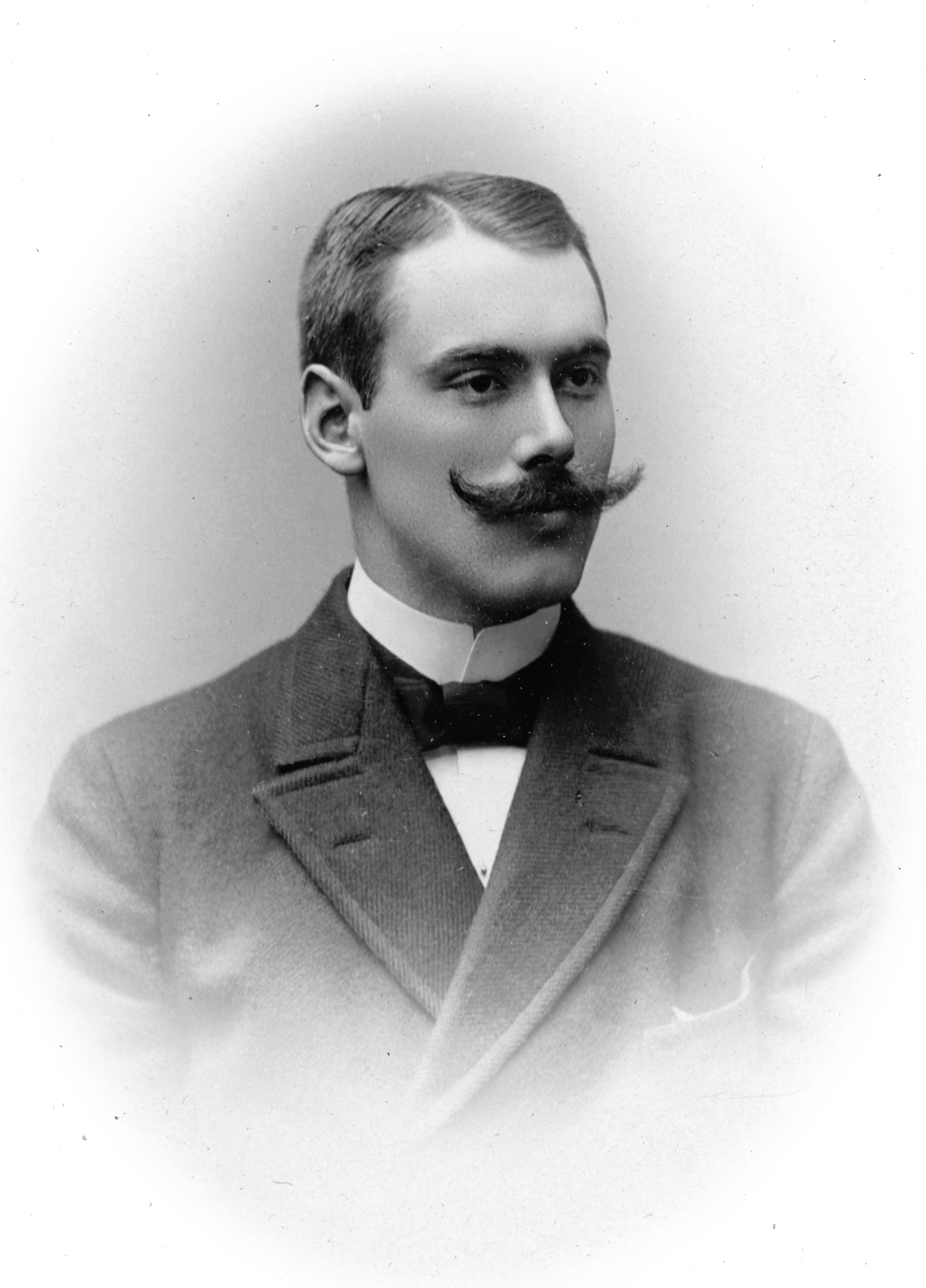
John Forsell (1897)

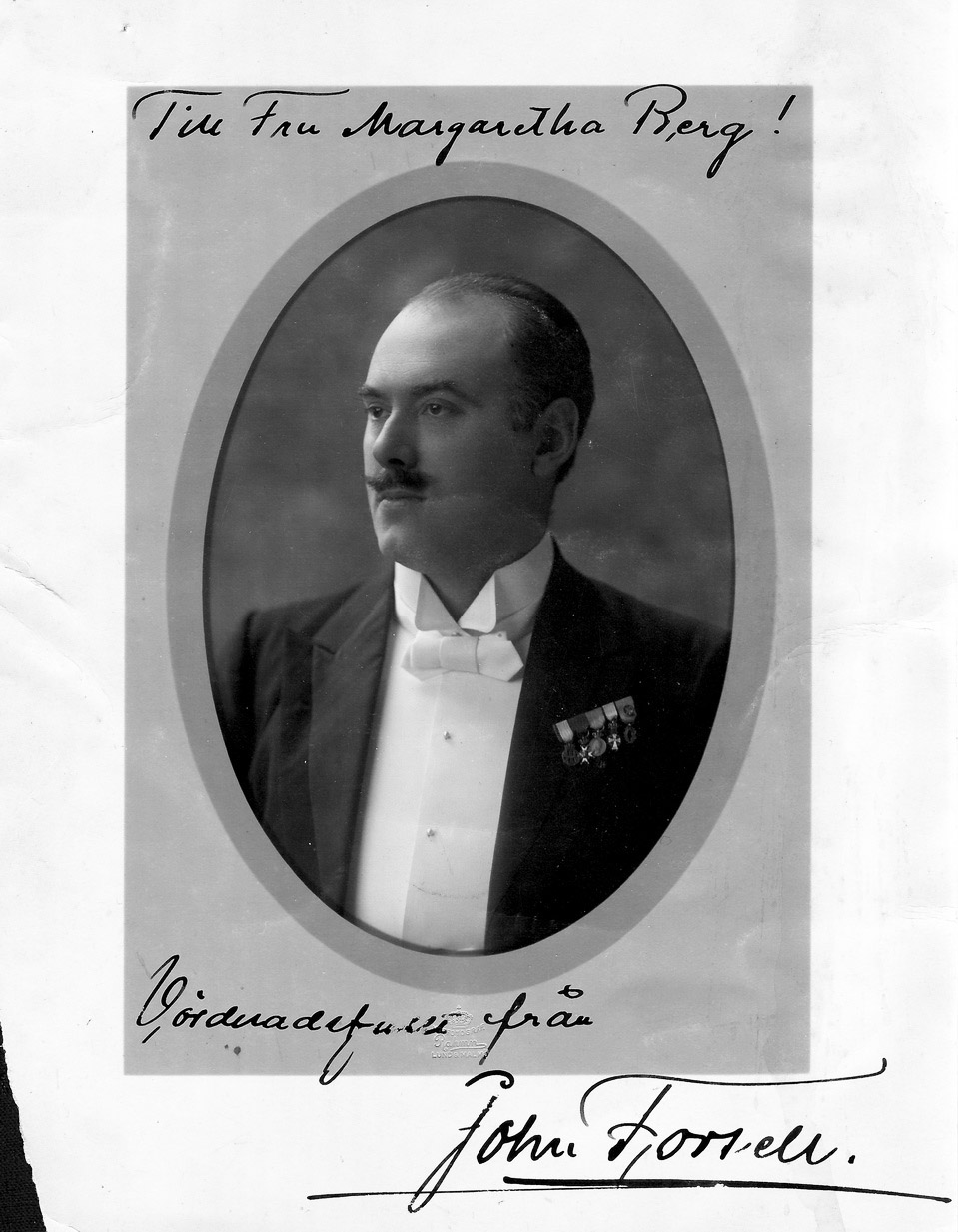
John Forsell pictured in a photograph signed with a personal dedication.

Carl Johan Jacob Forsell (6 November 1868 – 30 May 1941), known as John Forsell, was a prominent Swedish baritone, opera administrator and teacher of voice. He was the leading baritone of the Royal Swedish Opera (RSO) from 1896 to 1918, and thereafter sang roles periodically with the company until his last stage performance in 1938. From 1923 to 1939 he served as the director of the RSO. He also sang leading roles as a guest artist with opera companies internationally, drawing particular acclaim for his portrayal of the title character in Wolfgang Amadeus Mozart's Don Giovanni.

In 1899, Forsell was awarded the Litteris et Artibus and, a decade later, he was named a Hovsångare. The Royal Swedish Academy of Music awarded him membership in 1906.

== Early life and education ==
Born in Stockholm, Forsell was the son of Carl August Forsell, a sea captain, and Axeline Forsell (née Åberg). Before his singing career, he served in the Swedish Army; becoming a second lieutenant in 1890 and lieutenant in 1896. In 1897 he requested and was granted an honorable dismissal from the army, but continue to serve as a member of the Uppland Regiment reserves through 1901.

While serving in the army, he pursued voice studies with Julius Günther (1818–1904) at the Royal College of Music, Stockholm from 1892 to 1894. After graduating from college he studied singing further in Paris in 1895-1896 and later in Stockholm with Hedvig Willman (1841–1887) and Signe Hebbe (1837–1925).

== Singing career ==
Forsell made his operatic debut at the Royal Swedish Opera, Stockholm, in 1896 as Figaro in The Barber of Seville. He would remain that opera house's premier baritone through 1918, and thereafter appeared only periodically at that theatre up until his retirement from the stage in 1938. He sang in several world premieres with the company, including Wilhelm Stenhammar's Tirfing (1898) and Andreas Hallén's Valdemarskatten (1899, the title role of Valdemar IV of Denmark). He also appeared in the Swedish premieres of Eugene Onegin (1903, title role), Tosca (1904, Scarpia), and Salome (1909, Jochanaan).

Forsell also established an international career. From 1902 to 1906 he sang regularly at the Royal Danish Theatre in Copenhagen. In 1909-1910 he appeared at the Metropolitan Opera in New York City, performing such parts as Tonio in Pagliacci, Amfortas in Parsifal, Figaro in The Barber of Seville, Telramund in Lohengrin, Germont in La traviata and Yeletsky in the United States premiere of Tchaikovsky's The Queen of Spades.

The title role in Mozart's Don Giovanni was probably his most famous interpretation. He sang the part numerous times, including during the 1909 season at the Royal Opera House, Covent Garden, London, and at the 1930 Salzburg Festival. Other major opera houses in which Forsell sang the Don and various leading parts were the Berlin State Opera, the Dutch National Opera, and the Vienna State Opera. In 1915 he portrayed the role of the Foreigner/Francesco del Giocondo in the world premiere of Max von Schillings's Mona Lisa at the Staatsoper Stuttgart.

== Opera director, teacher, and later life ==
Forsell become the Director (Intendant) of the Royal Swedish Opera at the start of the 1923-1924 season, and performed less frequently on stage as a consequence. His voice, however, remained in fine condition. His final opera performance was on his 70th birthday when he sang the role of Count Almaviva in Mozart's The Marriage of Figaro at the RSO. He retired from his director's position in May 1939 and died in Stockholm two years later. His wife, soprano Gurli Carlström (married 1901), pre-deceased him in 1935. Their son, Björn Forsell, was also a successful opera singer.

In addition to his administrative duties at Stockholm's opera house during the 1920s and '30s, Forsell taught voice as a professor of singing at the Royal College of Music, Stockholm. His pupils included Joel Berglund, Jussi Björling, Helga Görlin, Magna Lykseth-Scherfven, Aksel Schiøtz, Hjördis Schymberg, Set Svanholm, and Inez Wassner.

He was awarded the Latvian Order of the Three Stars 1st Class on 15 November 1935.

== Recordings ==
Forsell's gramophone legacy consists of several batches of acoustic 78-rpm discs of arias and songs (made initially by the Gramophone & Typewriter Company prior to World War I) and some subsequent electrical recordings of live stage performances. Many of these recordings are available on modern CD reissues, most notably a four-disc anthology produced in 1994 by Caprice Records (CAP 21586). When discussing Forsell's impressive legacy on disc, the British audio restoration engineer Keith Hardwick has this to say: "His voice was a dark, warm, expressive baritone, very well produced and equalized."
