= Anna-Lisa Björling =

Swedish opera singer and actress (1920–2006)

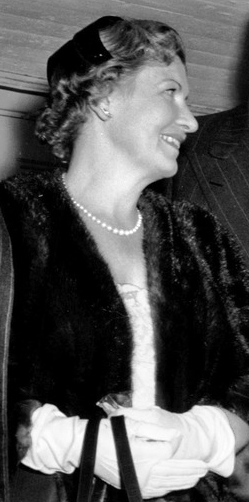
Anna-Lisa Björling, 1954

Anna-Lisa Björling (née Emy Anna-Lisa Berg; 15 March 1910 – 24 November 2006) was a Swedish opera singer and actress. She was married to tenor Jussi Björling from 1935 until his death in 1960.

Born in Stockholm, Anna-Lisa was a soprano who had studied at the Royal Swedish Academy of Music. After her marriage to Jussi Björling in 1935, Anna-Lisa focused on her family life and their children for ten years. When the children were older she resumed her musical studies, and made a very successful comeback at the Royal Swedish Opera in 1948, where she performed various roles until the late 1960s.

In Sweden and occasionally abroad, she performed duets with her husband Jussi Björling, for television specials and other events. In the 1930s she appeared in some Swedish films, as both an actress and a singer.

She was sometimes credited as Anna-Lisa Berg or Anna-Lisa Björling Barkman.

She died in Stockholm in 2006, at age 96.

== Selected filmography ==
- 1932 - Svarta rosor
- 1932 - Landskamp
- 1932 - Hans livs match
- 1931 - Skepp ohoj!
- 1931 - Falska miljonären

== Sources ==
- SvD - Anna-Lisa Björling Barkman död (short news report of her death with a mini biography) (from TT Spektra - Sweden)
- Björling, Anna-Lisa: Mitt liv med Jussi (My Life with Jussi), Stockholm, Bonnier, 1987 (Sweden).
