= Emanuel Björling =

Swedish mathematician (1808–1872)

Emanuel Gabriel Björling
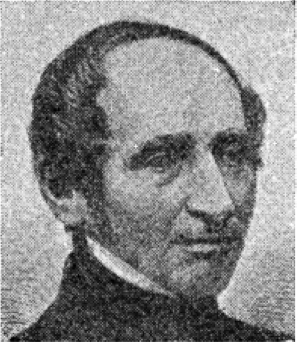
- Born: 2 December 1808; Västerås
- Died: 3 November 1872 (aged 63); Västerås
- Occupation: Mathematician
- Spouse: Sofia Emilia Bottiger
- Relatives: Carl Fabian Björling (son)

Emanuel Gabriel Björling (2 December 1808 – 3 November 1872) was a Swedish mathematician. He was the father of mathematician Carl Fabian Björling.

== Career ==
In 1836, he became the associate professor of mechanics at the University of Uppsala. He was a lecturer and later a rector at Västerås grammar school. He is most well known for the Björling problem.

In 1850, he became a member of the Royal Swedish Academy of Sciences.
