= Carl Georg Björling =

Swedish lawyer and professor

Carl Georg Björling (1870–1934) was a Swedish lawyer and professor.

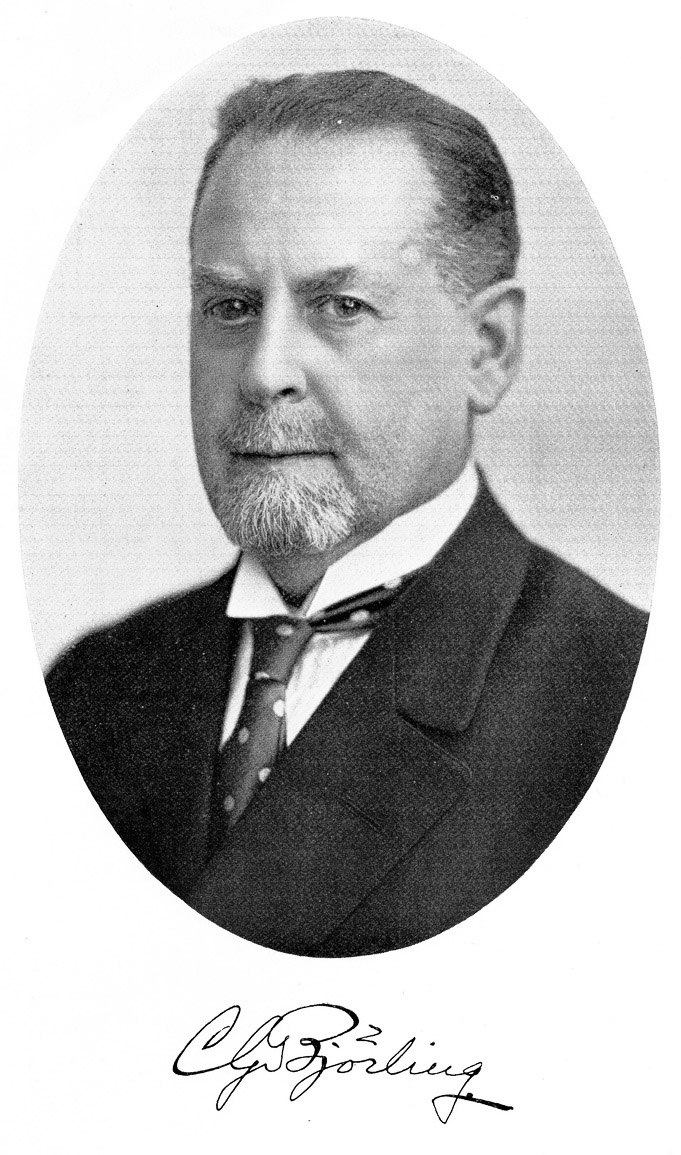
Carl Georg Björling (1870–1934).

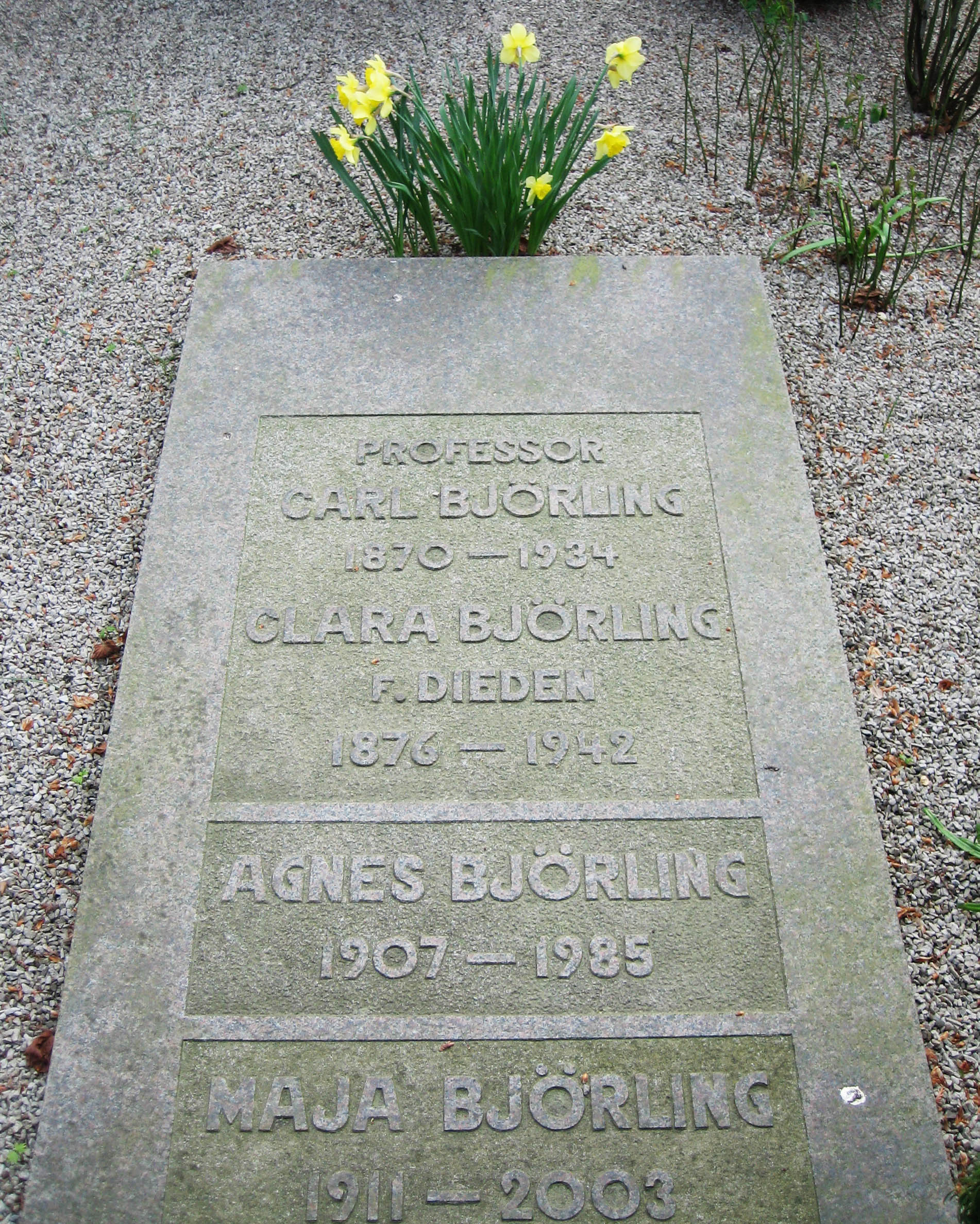
Björling's grave

== Life ==
He was born on 16 September 1870 in Halmstad, Sweden, and was the son of Carl Fabian Björling and his wife Minna Agnes Cecilia von Schéele. He died on 14 March 1934.

== Career ==
He attained his Juris Doctor degree from Lund University. He worked as a clerk at the Svea Court of Appeal. He later became a professor and vice-rector at Lund University.

== Honours ==
In 1920, he became a commander of the Dannebrog order.

== Bibliography ==
- Textbook of Civil Law for Beginners
