= Wilhelm Meister =

Fictional character created by Goethe

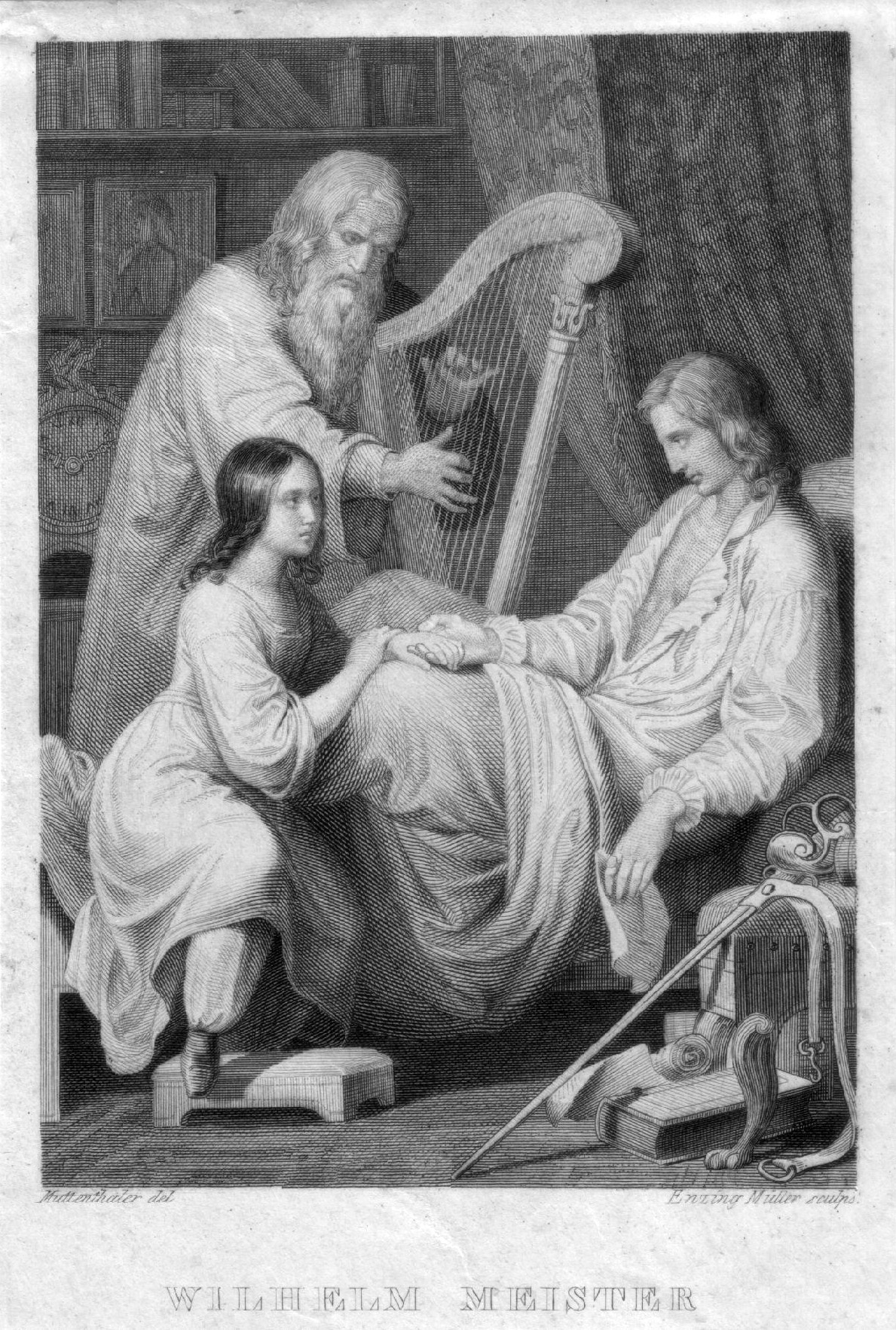
Mignon, harper and Wilhelm Meister on an 1850 steel engraving by Anton Muttenthaler (1820–1870)

Wilhelm Meister is the main character in Johann Wolfgang von Goethe's novels Wilhelm Meister's Apprenticeship and its sequel Wilhelm Meister's Journeyman Years.

== Description and history ==
Wilhelm Meister's story concerns how he comes from a family of businessmen and desires to transcend bourgeois life. In Wilhelm Meister's Apprenticeship, published in 1795–1796, he tries to achieve this by joining a theatre troupe and a secret society. In Wilhelm Meister's Journeyman Years, published in 1821 and revised substantially in 1829, he travels widely without a permanent residence.

Goethe chose the name Wilhelm as a nod to William Shakespeare, whose works feature prominently in Wilhelm Meister's Apprenticeship. The last name Meister, meaning Master, reflects the character's capability and active role. A recurring motif throughout both novels is Meister's fascination with the painting The King's Sick Son by Antonio Bellucci.

== In other media ==
Meister is portrayed in various adaptations of Goethe's novels, notably as a tenor in the 1866 opera Mignon composed by Ambroise Thomas. Rüdiger Vogler played a variation of Meister in Wim Wenders' 1975 film The Wrong Move, which is loosely based on Wilhelm Meister's Apprenticeship but takes place in post-war West Germany.
