= Carl Fabian Björling =

Swedish mathematician and meteorologist

Carl Fabian Emanuel Björling (30 November 1839 – 6 May 1910) was a Swedish mathematician and meteorologist.

== Life ==
He was born on 30 November 1839 in Västerås, Sweden, and died on 6 May 1910. He was the son of mathematician Emanuel Björling and father of lawyer Carl Georg Björling.

== Career ==
He attained his Ph.D. from Uppsala University in 1863. In 1863, he became an associate professor of mathematics at Uppsala University. In 1867 he was appointed a lecturer of mathematics and physics at the Halmstad grammar school.

From 1873 to 1904 he was the professor of mathematics at Lund University. In 1886, he became a member of the Royal Swedish Academy of Sciences.
