= Samson and Delilah discography =

Recordings of the opera by Camille Saint-Saëns

This is a list of audio and video recordings (discography) of Camille Saint-Saëns's 1877 French opera Samson et Dalila (Samson and Delilah).

== Audio recordings ==
Year	Cast: Samson, Dalila, Grand-prêtre de Dagon, Abimélech)	Conductor, opera house and orchestra	Label
1936	René Maison, Gertrud Pålson-Wettergren, Ezio Pinza, John Gurney	Maurice Abravanel, Metropolitan Opera Orchestra and Chorus (Live recording for radio on 26 December 1936 which has subsequently been released on CD.)	CD: Guild; Cat: 2273
1941	René Maison, Risë Stevens, Leonard Warren, Norman Cordon	Wilfrid Pelletier, Metropolitan Opera Orchestra and Chorus (Live recording for radio on 13 December 1941 which has subsequently been released on CD.)	CD: Omega Opera Archive
1946	José Luccioni, Hélène Bouvier, Paul Cabanel, Charles Cambon	Louis Fourestier, Paris Opéra Orchestra and Chorus (The first studio made recording and the first recording of the opera to be released commercially.)	CD: Naxos; Cat: 8.110063-64
1948	José Luccioni, Susanne Lefort, Pierre Nougaro, Ernest Mestrallet	Eugène Bigot, Grand Théâtre de Genève Orchestra and Chorus	CD: Malibran Music; Cat: MR502
1948	Lorenz Fehenberger, Res Fischer, Fred Destal, Max Eibel	Hans Altman, Orchester und Chor des Bayerischen Rundfunks	CD: Walhall; Cat: WLCD 0040
1949	Ramón Vinay, Risë Stevens, Robert Merrill, Osie Hawkins	Emil Cooper, Metropolitan Opera Orchestra and Chorus (Live recording for radio on 26 November 1949 which has subsequently been released on CD.)	CD: Omega Opera Archive
1953	Ramón Vinay, Risë Stevens, Sigurd Björling, Norman Scott	Fausto Cleva, Metropolitan Opera Orchestra and Chorus (Live recording for radio on 14 March 1953 which has subsequently been released on CD.)	CD: Omega Opera Archive
1954	Jan Peerce, Risë Stevens, Robert Merrill	Robert Shaw, NBC Symphony Orchestra and the Robert Shaw Chorale	CD: RCA Victor; Cat: LM 1848
1955	Ramón Vinay, Ebe Stignani, Antonio Manca-Serra, Giovanni Amodeo	Fritz Rieger, Teatro di San Carlo Orchestra and Chorus	CD: Bongiovanni; Cat: HOCO 31
1956	Set Svanholm, Blanche Thebom, Sigurd Björling	Herbert Sandberg, Royal Swedish Opera Orchestra and Chorus	CD: Caprice; Cat: CAP 22054
1962	Jon Vickers, Rita Gorr, Ernest Blanc, Anton Diakov	Georges Prêtre, Orchestre du Théâtre National de l'Opéra de Paris	CD: EMI classics
1964	Jon Vickers, Oralia Domínguez, Ernest Blanc, Henk Driessen	Jean Fournet, Netherlands Radio Symphony Orchestra	CD: Opera D'oro
1970	Richard Cassilly, Shirley Verrett, Robert Massard, Giovanni Foiani	Georges Prêtre, Orquestra do Teatro alla Scala	CD: Opera D'oro
1973	James King, Christa Ludwig, Bernd Weikl, Alexander Malta	Giuseppe Patanè, Münchner Rundfunkorchester	CD: BMG; Cat: 779-2-RG
1978	Plácido Domingo, Elena Obraztsova, Renato Bruson, Pierre Thau	Daniel Barenboim, Orchestre et Choeur de Paris	CD: Deutsche Grammophon; Cat: 413 297-2
1989	José Carreras, Agnes Baltsa, Jonathan Summers, Simon Estes	Sir Colin Davis, Bavarian Radio Symphony Orchestra and chorus	CD: Philips
1991	Plácido Domingo, Waltraud Meier, Alain Fondary, Jean-Philippe Courtis	Myung-whun Chung, Bastille Opera orchestra and chorus	CD: EMI Classics; Cat: 54470-2
1998	José Cura, Olga Borodina, Jean-Philippe Lafont, Egils Siliņš	Sir Colin Davis, London Symphony Orchestra & Chorus	CD: Elektra Records
2007	Clifton Forbis, Denyce Graves, Greer Grimsley, Philip Skinner	Karen Keltner, San Diego Symphony Orchestra & San Diego Opera Chorus	CD: Premiere Opera Ltd; Cat: CDNO 2793-2

- Note: "Cat:" is short for the label's catalogue number where available.

== Video recordings ==
Year	Cast: Samson, Dalila, Grand-prêtre de Dagon, Abimélech, Old Hebrew)	Conductor, opera house and orchestra	Label
1981	Plácido Domingo, Shirley Verrett, Wolfgang Brendel, Arnold Voketaitis, Kevin Langan	Julius Rudel, San Francisco Opera Orchestra and Chorus (Choreographer: Margo Sappington; recorded live)	DVD: Kultur Video; Cat: 032031 00109 1
1981	Jon Vickers, Shirley Verrett, Jonathan Summers, John Tomlinson, Gwynne Howell	Colin Davis, Royal Opera House Orchestra and Chorus (Producer: Elijah Moshinsky; recorded live, 6 October)	DVD: Kultur Video; Cat: 032031 00109 1
1998	Plácido Domingo, Olga Borodina, Sergei Leiferkus, Richard Paul Fink, René Pape	James Levine, Metropolitan Opera Orchestra and Chorus (Production: Elijah Moshinsky; choreographer: Graeme Murphy; TV director: Brian Large; recorded live, 28 September)	DVD: Deutsche Grammophon; Cat: 00440 073 0599; Streaming video: Met Opera on Demand
2010	José Cura, Julia Gertseva, Stefan Stoll, Lukas Schmidt, Ulrich Schneider	Jochem Hochstenbach, Baden State Theater Orchestra & Chorus (Designer & director: José Cura; recorded live, 22 & 24 October)	DVD: Arthaus Musik; Cat: 101 631
2016	Aleksandrs Antonenko, Anita Rachvelishvili, Egils Siliņš, Nicolas Testé, Nicolas Cavallier	Philippe Jordan, Paris Opera Orchestra & Chorus (Director: Damiano Michieletto; recorded live, 13 October, Opéra Bastille)	Full HD: Paris Opera Play
2018	Roberto Alagna, Elīna Garanča, Laurent Naouri, Elchin Azizov, Dimitry Belosselskiy	Mark Elder, Metropolitan Opera Orchestra & Chorus (Production: Darko Tresnjak; choreographer: Austin McCormick; recorded live, 20 October)	HD video: Met Opera on Demand
2022	SeokJong Back, Elīna Garanča, Łukasz Goliński, Blaise Malaba, Goderdzi Janelidze	Antonio Pappano, Royal Opera Orchestra and Chorus (Stage director: Richard Jones; recorded live, 10 June, Royal Opera House)	Blu-ray: Opus Arte; HD video: Royal Ballet and Opera Stream

- Note: "Cat:" is short for the label's catalogue number where available.
