= Peter Grimes =

1945 opera by Benjamin Britten

- Opera by Benjamin Britten
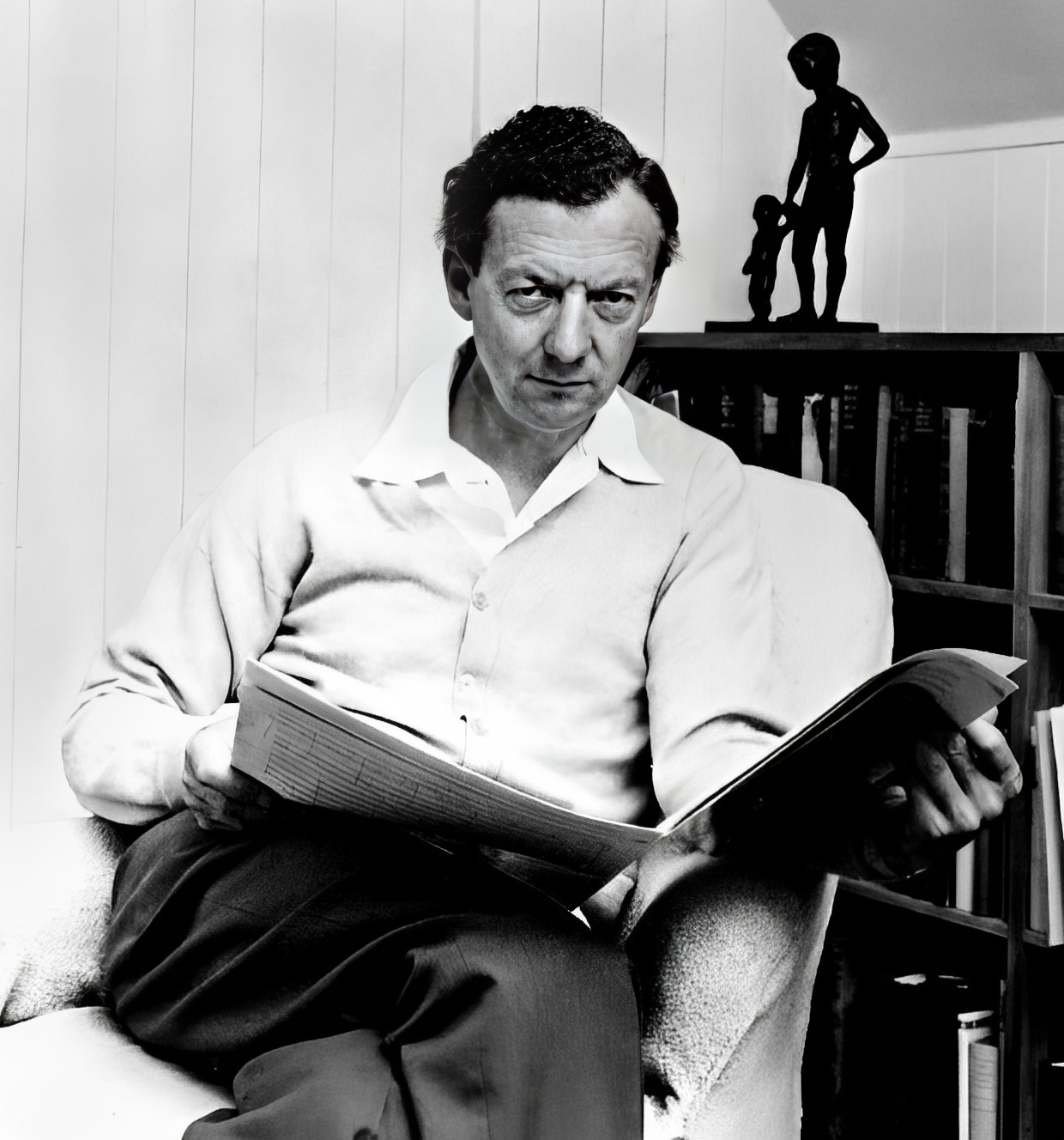
- Britten in 1968
- Librettist: Montagu Slater
- Language: English
- Based on: "Peter Grimes" by George Crabbe
- Premiere: 7 June 1945; 81 years ago Sadler's Wells, London

Peter Grimes, Op. 33, is an opera in three acts by Benjamin Britten, with a libretto by Montagu Slater based on the section "Peter Grimes", in George Crabbe's long narrative poem The Borough (1810). The "borough" of the opera is a fictional small town that bears some resemblance to Crabbe's – and later Britten's – home of Aldeburgh, Suffolk, on England's east coast.

The work was conceived while Britten was living in the US in the early years of the Second World War and completed when he returned to Britain in 1943. It was first performed at Sadler's Wells in London on 7 June 1945, conducted by Reginald Goodall, and was a critical and popular success. It is still widely performed, both in Britain and internationally, and has become part of the standard repertoire. Among the tenors who have performed the title role in the opera house, or on record, or both are Britten's partner Peter Pears, who sang the part at the premiere, and Allan Clayton, Ben Heppner, Anthony Rolfe Johnson, Jonas Kaufmann, Philip Langridge, Christopher Ventris, Stuart Skelton, Set Svanholm and Jon Vickers.

Four Sea Interludes, consisting of purely orchestral music from the opera, were published separately and are frequently performed as an orchestral suite. Another interlude, a passacaglia, was published separately and is also often performed, either together with the Sea Interludes or by itself.

== Background ==
=== US: 1941–1943 ===
In the early years of the Second World War, Benjamin Britten and his partner Peter Pears were living in the US. Britten's compositions from his years there include the song cycle Les Illuminations (1940), the Sinfonia da Requiem (1940) and his operetta, Paul Bunyan (1941). In 1941 Britten came across a transcript in the BBC's magazine The Listener of a talk by E. M. Forster about the 18th-century Suffolk poet George Crabbe. It began, "To talk about Crabbe is to talk about England". Britten was filled with nostalgic feelings about his native Suffolk. Pears found a copy of Crabbe's works in a second-hand bookshop and Britten read the poem The Borough, which contained the tragic story of the Aldeburgh fisherman Peter Grimes. He said later, "In a flash I realised two things: that I must write an opera, and where I belonged". He and Pears began sketching an operatic scenario drawing on The Borough.

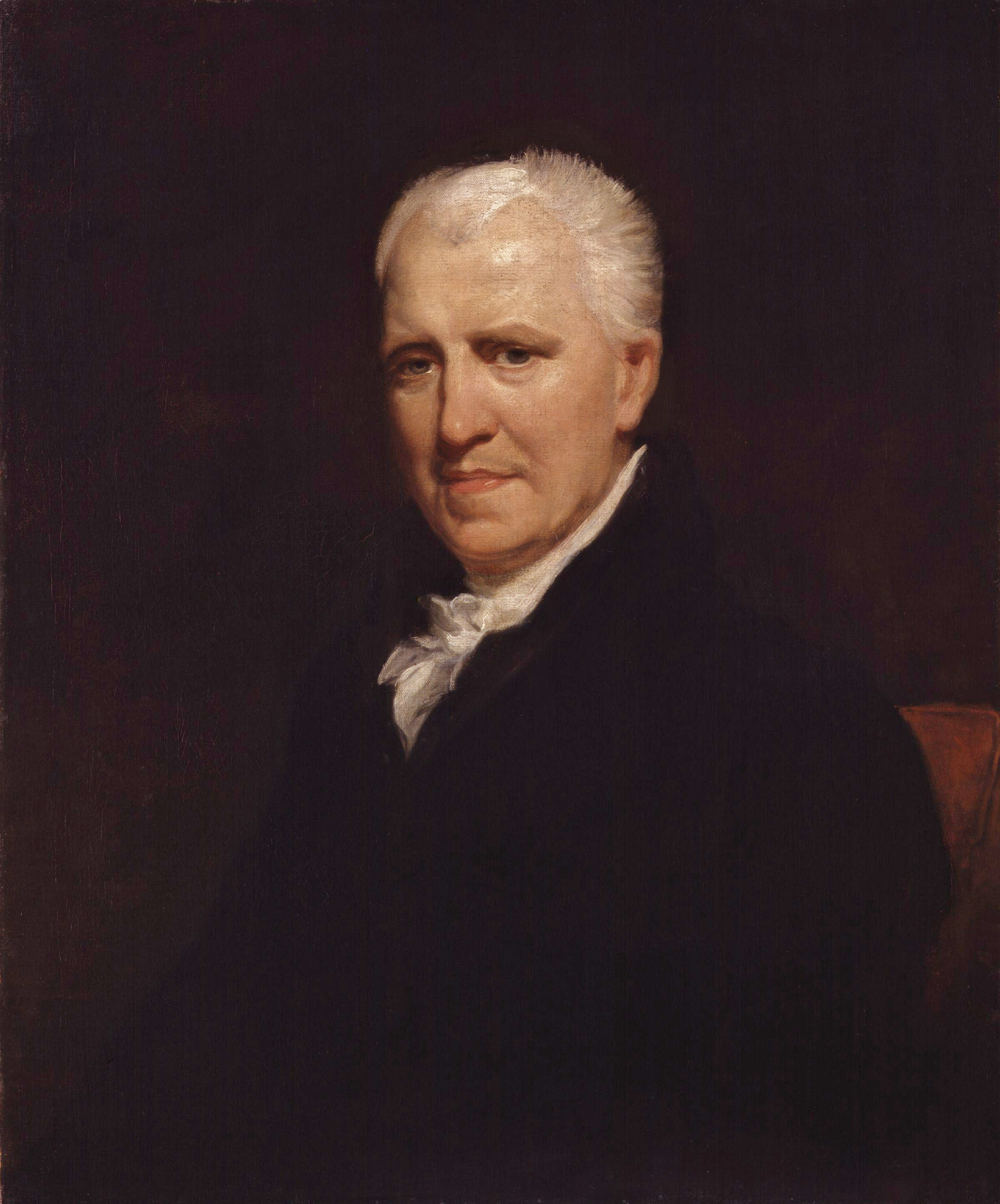
George Crabbe

From the outset the characters and story of the libretto were only loosely based on Crabbe's work. The Grimes of Crabbe's poem is an outright bully, "untouched by pity, unstung by remorse and uncorrected by shame". Three of his apprentices in succession have died before he is summoned to the Town Hall to account for his conduct, after which he is forbidden to employ another. He works alone until the ghosts of his victims begin to terrorise him and he sinks into madness and dies in bed. In Crabbe's poem, Ellen Orford's tale is completely separate from Grimes's and they are not mentioned as meeting each other. The Rector, Swallow, and the proprietress of the Boar inn, "Auntie", and her nieces derive from other sections of The Borough, but other characters in the opera, including Balstrode, Boles and Ned Keene, are not in Crabbe's original. (Note: Britten and Pears originally invented Balstrode as the landlord of the inn; he and Hobson are the only characters not traceable in some degree to the poem. The nearest to Boles's character in The Borough is an unnamed "Calvinistic Enthusiast" unconnected with the Grimes story; and there is a quack doctor in Crabbe's poem on whom the character of Keene draws (the surname is taken from an unrelated character in the poem, Abel Keene).)

While Britten and Pears were waiting for a passage back to England, the conductor Serge Koussevitzky asked the composer why he had not written an opera. Britten explained that doing so would necessitate putting all other work aside, which he could not afford to do. Koussevitzky arranged for the commissioning of the opera by the musical foundation he had recently set up. The fee was $1,000, and the opera was to be dedicated to the memory of Koussevitzky's wife, who had recently died. Britten approached his friend the writer Christopher Isherwood, inviting him to write the libretto. Pleading pressure of work and some reservations about the effectiveness of the subject, Isherwood declined.

=== London: 1943–1945 ===
During the voyage back to England, Pears continued to work on the scenario of the opera while Britten composed A Ceremony of Carols and Hymn to St Cecilia. The story, and Grimes's character, underwent substantial changes in the early stages of drafting. For a long time during the gestation of the work Britten conceived Grimes as a baritone role. Pears persuaded Britten to play down any emotional tie Grimes might feel to the apprentice, and play up his position as an outsider in an intolerant society. At first, Britten had Grimes murdering his apprentices rather than being at worst negligent. For some time the dénouement had Grimes on the marshes, going mad and dying there. An episode with smugglers was dropped and several characters were gradually eliminated as work progressed on the story. By the time Britten and Pears returned home in April 1943 the shape of the work was not greatly different from the final version, and to turn the scenario into a libretto Britten recruited an old friend, the writer Montagu Slater.

Slater was a journalist, novelist and playwright. Before the war Britten had composed incidental music for two short verse-plays of his. Eric Crozier, who worked closely with Britten, comments that the whole of the original text of the libretto – "apart from six quatrains by Crabbe and the small phrase 'Grimes is at his exercise'" – is Slater's work. He abandoned Crabbe's rhyming couplets and allowed his text "to reflect the diverse speech-rhythms of the individual Borough characters":

He wrote it in a four-beat, half-rhymed, simply worded verse which expands at moments of heightened intensity into more formal verse-patterns and a richer vocabulary: the latter qualities are clearly recognisable in such climactic arias as Ellen's "Let her among you without fault cast the first stone", or "Embroidery in childhood was a luxury of idleness", and in Peter's "What harbour shelters peace?", or "Now the Great Bear and Pleiades".

In Crozier's view, Slater's "short interjectory sentences" in the recitatives and the "more expansive phrases" of the arias are ideal for musical setting. In Slater's hands the character of Grimes was further developed. In Pears's words, Grimes is "neither a hero nor a villain", but "an ordinary, weak person who, being at odds with the society in which he finds himself, tries to overcome it and, in doing so, offends against the conventional code, is classed by society as a criminal, and destroyed as such. There are plenty of Grimeses around still, I think!"

Discussions between composer and librettist, revisions and corrections took nearly eighteen months. In January 1944 Britten started writing the music and just over a year later it was complete. The premiere had been planned for Koussevitzky's Tanglewood Festival, but the festival had been suspended for the duration of the war, and Koussevitzky waived his contractual rights and gave his blessing to Sadler's Wells Opera to stage the first performances, saying that the opera – which he thought the greatest since Carmen – belonged not to him but to the world.

Tyrone Guthrie, the general administrator of the Sadler's Wells company, appointed his assistant Eric Crozier to stage the piece, and the latter, together with Britten, made adjustments to the libretto during rehearsals when Slater's text proved unsuitable for singability or clarity. (Note: In addition to minor alterations, Britten, with the help of another writer friend, Ronald Duncan, made a substantial change to Slater's text, rewriting Grimes's "mad" soliloquy in Act 3 scene 2, which the composer found "pedestrian" in the original libretto.) Slater resented this, and insisted on publishing his original version in 1946, as Peter Grimes and Other Poems. Crozier brought in Kenneth Green to design the costumes and sets, the latter being naturalistic and based on Aldeburgh.

== Performance history ==
=== Premiere ===
Sadler's Wells had been closed during the war, and the premiere of Peter Grimes, on 7 June 1945, marked the reopening of the theatre. When Joan Cross, director of the company, announced the plan to reopen the house with Peter Grimes − herself and Pears in the leading roles − there were complaints from company members about supposed favouritism and the "cacophony" of Britten's score. Yet when Peter Grimes opened it was hailed by public and critics; its box-office takings matched or exceeded those for La bohème and Madame Butterfly, which were being staged concurrently by the company.

==== Original cast ====
Scene from 1945 production

Role	Voice type	Premiere cast, 7 June 1945 (Conductor: Reginald Goodall)
Peter Grimes, a fisherman	tenor	Peter Pears
Ellen Orford, a widow, Borough schoolmistress	soprano	Joan Cross
Auntie, landlady of The Boar	contralto	Edith Coates
Niece 1	soprano	Blanche Turner
Niece 2	soprano	Minnia Bower
Balstrode, retired merchant skipper	baritone	Roderick Jones
Mrs Sedley, a rentier widow	mezzo-soprano	Valetta Iacopi
Swallow, a lawyer	bass	Owen Brannigan
Ned Keene, apothecary and quack	baritone	Edmund Donlevy
Bob Boles, fisherman and Methodist	tenor	Morgan Jones
The Rev Horace Adams, rector	tenor	Tom Culbert
Hobson, carrier	bass	Frank Vaughan
Dr Thorp (Note: The name of the silent role of the doctor is changed to Dr Crabbe in the published libretto.)	silent role	Saša Machov
John, Grimes's apprentice	silent role	Leonard Thompson

Source: Libretto.

=== Later London productions ===
Sadler's Wells and its successor, English National Opera, staged new productions in 1963, 1990 and 2009. Grimes was played by, respectively, Ronald Dowd, Philip Langridge and Stuart Skelton; the conductors were Charles Mackerras, David Atherton and Edward Gardner.

Peter Grimes was staged at the Royal Opera House in 1947, in a production by Guthrie, conducted by Karl Rankl, with Pears, Cross and Edith Coates reprising their roles from the Sadler's Wells premiere. There have been four new productions at Covent Garden since then, directed by John Cranko (1953), Elijah Moshinsky (1975), Willy Decker (2004, a co-production with the Théâtre Royal de la Monnaie, Brussels) and Deborah Warner (2022, a co-production with the Teatro Real, Madrid, the Teatro dell'Opera, Rome, and the Opéra National de Paris). The conductors were, respectively, Goodall, Colin Davis, Antonio Pappano and Mark Elder, and the title role was sung by Pears, Jon Vickers, Ben Heppner and Allan Clayton. In revivals of the earlier productions, Grimes was played by tenors including Richard Lewis, Richard Cassilly, Robert Tear, Langridge, and Anthony Rolfe Johnson.

=== Regional British productions ===
Productions by other British opera companies include Colin Graham's 1968 staging for Scottish Opera, conducted by Alexander Gibson with Nigel Douglas as Grimes; Glyndebourne Festival's first production of the work in 1992, directed by Trevor Nunn and conducted by Andrew Davis and, in revivals, Franz Welser-Most and Mark Wigglesworth; a 1999 version by Welsh National Opera, directed by Peter Stein and conducted by Carlo Rizzi with John Daszak as Grimes; and Opera North's 2006 production, directed by Phyllida Lloyd and conducted by Richard Farnes with Jeffrey Lloyd-Roberts as Grimes. In the summer of 2013, to mark the centenary of Britten's birth, the Aldeburgh Festival staged its first performance of Peter Grimes. It was played in its natural setting on the beach at Aldeburgh. Steuart Bedford conducted, and Alan Oke sang Grimes.

=== American productions ===
The American premiere of the work was given in August 1946 at Tanglewood, conducted by Koussevitzky's protégé Leonard Bernstein, with William Horne in the title role. The Metropolitan Opera first staged the piece in 1948 with Frederick Jagel as Grimes. The house staged a new production in 1967, directed by Guthrie and conducted by Colin Davis, with Vickers as Grimes. A subsequent production, by John Doyle, was presented in 2008, conducted by Donald Runnicles, with Anthony Dean Griffey in the title role.

=== Continental Europe ===
One of the first productions of the work outside Britain was at the Royal Swedish Opera in March 1946, conducted by Herbert Sandberg, with Set Svanholm as Grimes. Productions in Basel, Antwerp and Zurich followed within weeks. The opera was given in Paris at the Opéra in 1981 directed by Moshinsky and conducted by John Pritchard, with Vickers in the title role and a largely Franco-British cast. (Note: In addition to Vickers, the Opéra cast included another Canadian, Gino Quilico, as Ned Keene.) A production by Graham Vick was staged at the Opéra Bastille in 2001, conducted by James Conlon, with Heppner as Grimes. A production by Richard Jones at La Scala, Milan in 2012 was conducted by Robin Ticciati, with John Graham-Hall as Grimes. In addition to the co-productions, above, between the Royal Opera and the Monnaie in Brussels, the Teatro Real in Madrid, the Teatro dell'Opera in Rome, and the Paris Opéra, productions included two in 2022: at the Vienna State Opera in a production directed by Christine Mielitz and conducted by Simone Young, with Jonas Kaufmann as Grimes, Lise Davidsen as Ellen Orford and Bryn Terfel as Balstrode; and the Bavarian State Opera in a production by Stefan Herheim, conducted by Gardner, with Skelton as Grimes, Rachel Willis-Sørensen as Ellen and Iain Paterson as Balstrode.

== Synopsis ==
=== Prologue ===
A Suffolk coastal village, "towards 1830".

Peter Grimes is questioned at an inquest over the death at sea of his apprentice. The townsfolk make it clear that they think Grimes is guilty and deserves punishment. The coroner, Mr Swallow, determines the boy's death to be accidental so Grimes avoids a criminal trial. The Coroner advises Grimes not to get another apprentice – a proposal against which Grimes vigorously protests. As the court is cleared, Ellen Orford, the schoolmistress whom Grimes wishes to marry as soon as he gains the Borough's respect, attempts to comfort Grimes as he rages against what he sees as the community's unwillingness to give him a true second chance.

=== Act 1 ===
The quay, Aldeburgh (late 19th century photograph)

The same, some days later

After the first orchestral Interlude (titled, in the Four Sea Interludes concert version, "Dawn"), the chorus, who constitute "the Borough", sing of their weary daily round and their relationship with the sea and the seasons. Grimes calls for help to haul his boat ashore, but is shunned by most of the community. Belatedly, retired skipper Balstrode and the apothecary, Ned Keene, assist Grimes by turning the capstan. Keene tells Grimes that he has found him a new apprentice (named John) from the workhouse. Nobody will volunteer to fetch the boy, until Ellen offers ("Let her among you without fault...").

As a storm approaches, most of the community – after securing windows and equipment – take shelter in the pub. Grimes stays out, and alone with Balstrode confesses his ambitions: to make his fortune with a "good catch", buy a good home and marry Ellen Orford. Balstrode suggests "without your booty [Ellen] will have you now", only to provoke Grimes's furious "No, not for pity!" Balstrode abandons Grimes to the storm, as the latter ruminates "What harbour shelters peace?" The storm then breaks with a vengeance (second orchestral Interlude).

In the pub, tensions are rising due both to the storm and to the fiery Methodist fisherman, Bob Boles, getting increasingly drunk and lecherous after the pub's main attraction, the two "nieces". Grimes suddenly enters ("Now the Great Bear and Pleiades..."), and his wild appearance unites almost the entire community in their fear and mistrust of his "temper". Ned Keene saves the situation by starting a round ("Old Joe has gone fishing"). Just as the round reaches a climax, Ellen arrives with the apprentice, both drenched. Grimes immediately sets off with the apprentice to his hut, despite the terrible storm.

=== Act 2 ===
The same, some weeks later

On a sunny Sunday morning (the Third Orchestral Interlude), while most Borough townspeople are at church, Ellen talks with John the apprentice. She is horrified to find a bruise on his neck. When she confronts Grimes about it, he brusquely dismisses it as an accident. Growing angry at her concern and interference, he strikes her and runs off with the boy. This does not go unseen: first Keene, Auntie, and Bob Boles, then the chorus comment on what has happened, the latter developing into a mob which sets off to investigate at Grimes's fisherman's hut. As they march off, Ellen, Auntie, and the nieces sing despairingly of the town's menfolk. ('From the gutter, why should we trouble at their ribaldry?') The Fourth Orchestral Interlude (Passacaglia) follows as the scene changes.

At the hut, Grimes impatiently demands John change out of his Sunday clothes and into fisherman's gear. Though it is a Sunday he hastily prepares to set out to fish as he has seen a large shoal of herring. Grimes becomes lost in his memories of his previous apprentice, reliving the boy's death of thirst. When he hears the mob of townspeople approaching, he quickly snaps back to reality. He is angry and defiant, stirred by a paranoid belief that John has been gossiping with Ellen, so provoking the anger of the town against him. He warns John to be careful as they climb down the cliff to the boat, but in their haste the boy slips to his death below. When the mob reaches the hut, Grimes and the apprentice are not to be found, so they disperse, curious and suspicious.

=== Act 3 ===
The same, two days later, night in the Borough ("Moonlight" in the Sea Interludes).

At a town dance, Mrs Sedley tries to convince the authorities that Grimes is a murderer. Ellen and Captain Balstrode confide in each other: Grimes has disappeared, and Balstrode has discovered a jersey washed ashore. Ellen recognises it as one she had knitted for John. ('Embroidery in childhood was a luxury of idleness') Mrs Sedley overhears this and, with the knowledge that Grimes has returned, whips up another vigilante mob. Singing "Him who despises us we'll destroy", the villagers march off in search of Grimes. (The sixth interlude, not included in the concert version of the Sea Interludes, covers the change of scene.)

While the townspeople can be heard off-stage hunting for him, Grimes appears onstage singing a monologue, interspersed by cries from the mob and by a mournful fog horn (a solo tuba). The death of his second apprentice has shattered Grimes who sounds panicked, distracted and unfocused. Ellen and Balstrode discover him before the furious townspeople get there, and the sea captain advises Grimes that the best thing he can do is sail out to sea and drown himself by scuppering his boat. Silently, Grimes walks out. The next morning life in the Borough begins as usual as if nothing has happened, though there is a report from the coastguard of a boat seen sinking far off the coast. This is dismissed by Auntie as "one of these rumours".

== Sea Interludes ==
To cover the scene changes during the opera Britten wrote six orchestral interludes. Five of them have been published separately. The Four Sea Interludes, Op 33a, is a suite of about 17 minutes' duration, comprising the first, third, fifth and second interludes from the opera, with the titles "Dawn", "Sunday Morning", "Moonlight" and "Storm". The fourth interlude, a passacaglia, has been published separately as Op 33b, and is sometimes appended to the Four Sea Interludes in concert and recordings. Britten conducted the London Philharmonic Orchestra in the first performance of the suite at the Cheltenham Festival, a week after the opera's premiere; the London premiere was at the Proms, in August 1945, and the five interludes were conducted by Sir Thomas Beecham in October 1945.

== Critical reception ==
=== First productions ===
In The Observer, William Glock rated the first act less convincing than the other two, but found the opera as a whole "a most thrilling work", displaying Britten's "genius". The Manchester Guardian's critic, William McNaught, considered the music "full of vivid suggestion and action, sometimes rising to a kind of white-hot poetry", but thought the libretto insufficiently "operatic" – "overloaded with scrappy and not always telling incident". The Scotsman's critic took a different view, calling the work "that rare thing – a piece of perfect collaboration between librettist and composer". The reviewer in The Times (Note: Reviews in The Times were not signed at the time, but the paper's chief music critic of the period was Frank Howes.) found the use of a single spoken line for Balstrode at a key point intrusive in an otherwise through-composed score, but praised Britten's "effortless originality" and "orchestral music of diabolical cunning".

After the American premiere, the critic Douglas Watt opened his review "Peter Grimes has greatness", and called the work "an opera for our time, brilliantly conceived and executed", with the "breathtaking pleasure" of the music matched by "the strong and lovely libretto", though he predicted that if an impresario succeeded in staging the piece on Broadway "it will be met with much intolerance and displeasure by audiences unprepared for its surprising magnificences". In The Boston Globe, Cyrus Durgin praised the young Bernstein for bringing out "the drive and dissonance of an opera which is far from 'tuneful' in the conventional sense" and rated the work "a step forward for opera in this country, and anywhere for that matter".

=== Later assessments ===
Grove's Dictionary of Music and Musicians describes Peter Grimes as "a powerful allegory of homosexual oppression", and The New York Times has called it one of "the true operatic masterpieces of the 20th century"; the composer's own contemporary (1948) summation of the work was "a subject very close to my heart – the struggle of the individual against the masses. The more vicious the society, the more vicious the individual". In a 1963 analysis of the opera in Music & Letters, J. W. Garbutt contended that Britten's "inventive genius" and the richness of the score led the listener to suspend disbelief, but that Slater's libretto failed to reconcile the violent and the visionary in Grimes's character and conduct. In a retrospective consideration of the opera in 1972, Peter Garvie argued in Tempo that although it had seemed uniquely new when it first appeared, it was in fact "a great but final reincarnation of more or less traditional opera", and that it holds no promise of redemption for the characters, unlike Britten's later operas.

In The University of Toronto Quarterly in 2005, Allan Hepburn considered the various views of previous commentators on the extent to which homosexuality is relevant to the plot of the opera. He notes that in Peter Conrad's analysis, "Grimes the boy-killer is the homosexual outcast, looking to Ellen Orford to effect his redemption, even his cure", and that for Philip Brett Britten's operas are "preoccupied with the social experience of homosexuality", but Hepburn concludes that Grimes can be seen in several different ways:

as a misfit: as a queer character who cannot envision himself married to a woman; as a labourer who cannot work his way into the good graces of the townspeople; as a victim of oppression who cannot counteract the rumours that circulate about him.

In 2020 Rupert Christiansen wrote that Peter Grimes can be labelled a "folk" opera, to the extent that:

it embodies a distinctly English culture in the same way that Mussorgsky's Boris Godunov embodies Russianness and Gershwin's Porgy and Bess is shaped by the African-American experience – something most evident in all three operas through the magnificent choruses that incorporate traditional tunes.

Christiansen also remarks on "the sharp, Dickensian characterisations" of the various inhabitants of the Borough, showing the composer's exceptional gift for setting the English language to music.

== Recordings ==
Year	Cast: Peter Grimes, Ellen Orford, Balstrode, Auntie	Conductor	Opera House and Orchestra	Label
1948	Peter Pears, Joan Cross	Reginald Goodall	Royal Opera House, Covent Garden Orchestra and BBC Theatre Chorus	CD: EMI Classics 64727; Cat: (excerpts)
1958	Peter Pears, Claire Watson, James Pease, Jean Watson	Benjamin Britten	Royal Opera House, Covent Garden Orchestra and Chorus, Recorded Walthamstow Assembly Hall, London	London CD: Decca; Cat: 414577 (reissued 1990, 2001, 2006)
1969	Peter Pears, Heather Harper, Bryan Drake, Elizabeth Bainbridge	Benjamin Britten	London Symphony Orchestra, Ambrosian Opera Chorus, Recorded Snape Maltings.	BBC Recording DVD: Decca; Cat: 074 3261
1978	Jon Vickers, Heather Harper, Jonathan Summers, Elizabeth Bainbridge	Colin Davis	Royal Opera House, Covent Garden Orchestra and Chorus	CD: Philips; Cat: 462847 (reissued 1999)
1981	Jon Vickers, Heather Harper, Norman Bailey, Elizabeth Bainbridge	Colin Davis	Royal Opera House, Covent Garden Orchestra and Chorus	DVD: Kultur; Cat: 2255 (released 2003)
1992	Anthony Rolfe Johnson, Felicity Lott, Thomas Allen, Patricia Payne	Bernard Haitink	Royal Opera House, Covent Garden Orchestra and Chorus	CD: EMI Classics; Cat: 5483222 (reissued 2003, EMI Classics: 915620)
1994	Philip Langridge, Janice Cairns, Alan Opie, Ann Howard	David Atherton	English National Opera Orchestra and Chorus	DVD: Kultur; Cat: 2902
1995	Philip Langridge, Janice Watson, Alan Opie, Ameral Gunson	Richard Hickox	City of London Sinfonia and London Symphony Orchestra Chorus	CD: Chandos; Cat: 9447
2004	Glenn Winslade, Janice Watson, Anthony Michaels-Moore, Jill Grove	Colin Davis	London Symphony Orchestra and Chorus	CD: LSO Live; Cat: 54
2005	Christopher Ventris, Emily Magee, Alfred Muff, Liliana Nikiteanu	Franz Welser-Möst	Orchester und Chor der Oper Zürich	DVD: EMI Classics; Cat: 00971
2008	Anthony Dean Griffey, Patricia Racette, Anthony Michaels-Moore, Felicity Palmer	Donald Runnicles	Orchestra and Chorus of the Metropolitan Opera	DVD: EMI Classics
2012	John Graham-Hall, Susan Gritton, Christopher Purves, Felicity Palmer	Robin Ticciati	Orchestra e Coro del Teatro alla Scala	DVD: Opus Arte; Cat: OA1103D
2013	Alan Oke, Giselle Allen, David Kempster, Gaynor Keeble	Steuart Bedford	Britten-Pears Orchestra; Chorus of Opera North; Chorus of the Guildhall School of Music and Drama	CD: Signum SIGCD 348; DVD: Arthaus Musik 102179
2019	Stuart Skelton, Erin Wall, Roderick Williams, Susan Bickley	Edward Gardner	Grieg Hall; Bergen Philharmonic Orchestra; Bergen Philharmonic Choir; Edvard Grieg Kor; Royal Northern College of Music Chorus; Choir of Collegium Musicum	CD: Chandos; CHAN 5250

== Notes, references and sources ==
=== Sources ===
- Banks, Paul (2000). The Making of Peter Grimes: Essays and Studies. Woodbridge: Boydell Press. ISBN 0-85115-791-2.
- Brett, Philip (1983). Benjamin Britten: Peter Grimes. Cambridge and New York: Cambridge University Press. ISBN 978-0-521-22916-6.
- Carpenter, Humphrey (1993). Benjamin Britten: A Biography. London: Faber & Faber. ISBN 978-0-571-14325-2.
- Crabbe, George (1903) [1810]. The Borough. London: Dent. OCLC 931157038.
- Gilbert, Susie (2009). Opera for Everybody. London: Faber and Faber. ISBN 978-0-571-22493-7.
- Herbert, David, ed. (1989). The Operas of Benjamin Britten. London: Herbert Press. ISBN 978-1-871569-08-7.
- Greenhalgh, Michael (2013). A critical edition, with introduction and commentary, of the libretto texts of Montagu Slater and Benjamin Britten's Peter Grimes (PhD). University of Oxford. OCLC 908409328.
- Matthews, David (2013). Britten. London: Haus Publishing Limited. ISBN 978-1-908323-38-5.
