= Prinsessan av Cypern =

Prinsessan av Cypern may refer to:

- Prinsessan av Cypern (Larsson), an opera by Lars-Erik Larsson
- Prinsessan av Cypern (Pacius), an opera by Fredrik Pacius
