= Lycksalighetens ö =

1945 Swedish opera

Lycksalighetens ö (The Isle of Bliss) is a Swedish-language opera in four acts by Hilding Rosenberg; the libretto by the composer, is based on the 1823 play of the same name by Per Daniel Amadeus Atterbom.

Atterbom's work – his most extensive piece of writing – is based on the 1690 fairy tale "Histoire d'Hypolite, comte de Duglas" by Madame d'Aulnoy which Atterbom follows closely, but added his own layer of allegory on enjoying bliss for its own sake. Poetry which only touches the senses, cannot satisfy nobler souls yearning for eternal life and happiness (such as King Astolf).

Written during the Second World War, it was first performed at the Royal Swedish Opera, Stockholm, on 1 February 1945 and was revived several times in the following years. In 2002 Norrlands Opera presented a production of a slightly abridged version of the score in Umeå conducted by Kristjan Järvi, of which recorded performances were issued by Musica Sveciae.

== Roles ==
Roles, voice types, premiere cast
| Role | Voice type | Premiere cast, 1 February 1945 Conductor: Herbert Sandberg |
|---|---|---|
| Felicia, Queen of the Isle of Bliss | soprano | Brita Herzberg |
| Zephyr, the West Wind | soprano | Hjördis Schymberg |
| Astolf, King of the Hyperboreans | tenor | Einar Beyron |
| Anemotis, Mother of the Winds | contralto | Margit Sehlmark |
| Nyx, Star Mother | contralto | Gertrud Pålson-Wettergren |
| Time | baritone | Georg Svedenbrant |
| The genius of youth | soprano | Ruth Moberg |
| Peribanou, Queen of the Fairies | mezzo-soprano | Britta Ewert |
| Young Florio | tenor | Arne Ohlson |
| Old Florio | baritone | Folke Jonsson |
| A huntsman | baritone | |
| The nightingale | soprano | Florence Widgren |
| Nymphs | female voices | |
| Mopsus | tenor | Simon Edwardsen |
| A guide | tenor | |
| Priest | bass | |
Chorus: Hunters, villagers, sprites, nymphs, lamplighters.

== Synopsis ==
The first and fourth acts are set in the land of the Hyperboreans, the second and third acts on the Isle of Bliss.

In a cold forest, Astolf, king of the Hyperboreans loses his way while out hunting, and his courtiers accuse the bard Florio of leading him astray with tales of warmer lands. Astolf finds himself in the Cave of the Winds where he encounters Anemotis. As the winds return home to their mother, Zephyr, the west wind sings about the Isle of Bliss. Astolf is entranced and asks Zephyr to carry him there in a cloak of invisibility.

At the Isle of Bliss nymphs take their breakfast at the Fountain of Youth. Astolf meets Felicia, their queen. Over-hearing a discussion about a threat to Bliss from a neighbouring kingdom, Astolf reveals himself and offers his help. Felicia and Astolf fall in love and wed, and they drink from the Fountain of Youth.

Sometime later, after several nightmares, one of which has Time reminding him of his royal responsibilities, Felicia calms Astolf and he goes back to sleep. When he asks how long he has been on the island, she tells him three centuries. She prevents him leaving by making a nightingale sing to him. Nyx chides Felicia for preventing Astolf from going back to his kingdom. She says farewell and the winged horse Pegasus takes him back to the Hyperboreans.

Back in Hyperborea it is autumn; Astolf meets a descendant of Florio who sings a ballad about Astolf held prisoner by a witch. He next stands by his own tomb in the cathedral and his guide, spotting the resemblance flees in terror. Coming upon a feast Astolf sees that the land has sunk into decadence. As Astolf vows to return to Bliss, Zephyr arrives to lead Astolf away to the idyllic isle. When Astolf helps an old man at the wayside, Time as Death takes the desperate Astolf. Astolf's horse Pegasus flies off to the isle while he lies alone.
