= Blanche Thebom =

American opera singer (1915–2010)

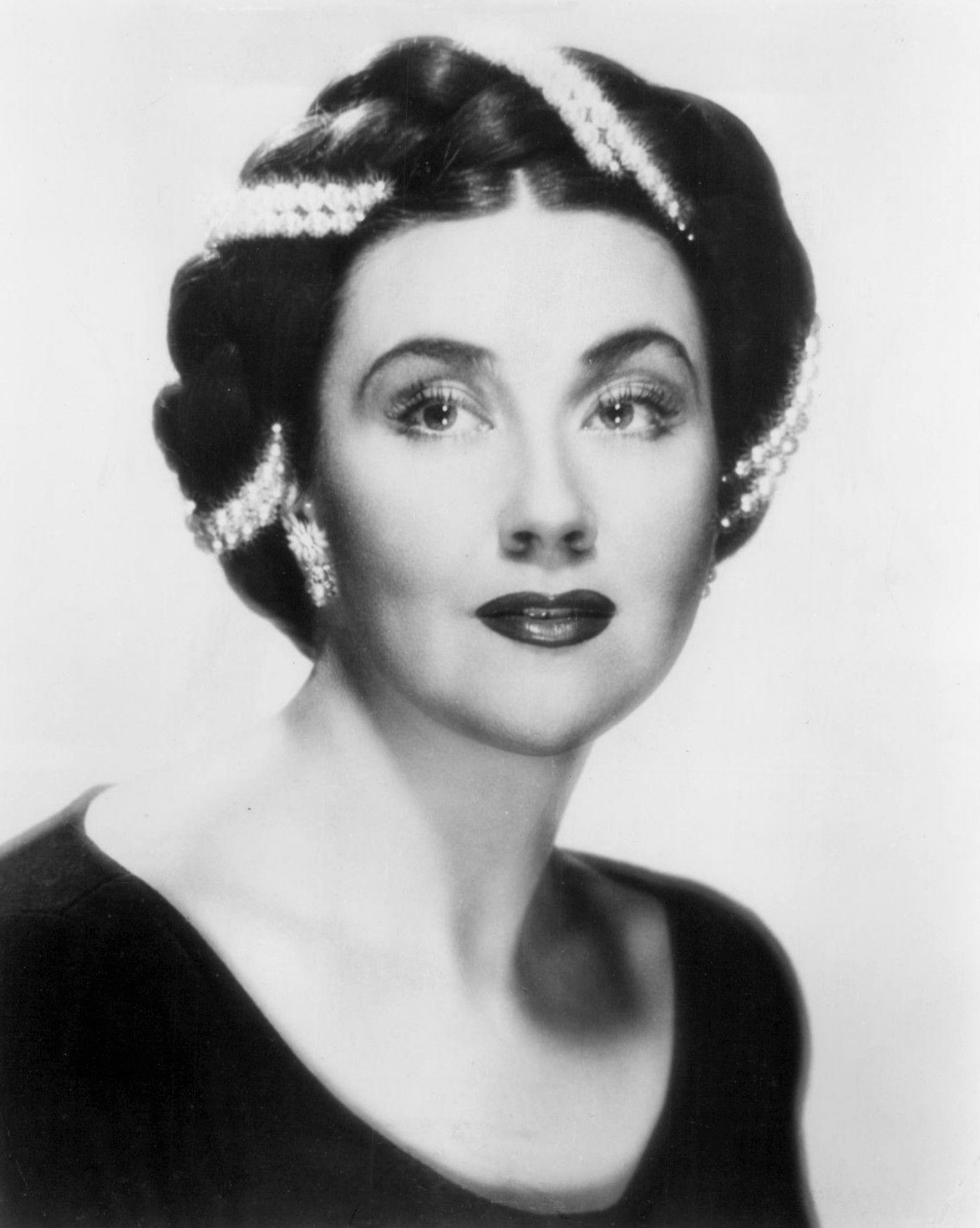
Thebom in 1954.

Blanche Thebom (September 19, 1915 – March 23, 2010) was an American operatic mezzo-soprano, voice teacher, and opera director. She was part of the first wave of American opera singers that had highly successful international careers. In her own country she had a long association with the Metropolitan Opera in New York City which lasted 22 years. Opera News stated, "An ambitious beauty with a velvety, even-grained dramatic mezzo, Thebom was a natural for opera: she commanded the stage with the elegantly disciplined hauteur of an old-school diva, relishing the opportunity to play femmes du monde such as Marina in Boris Godunov, Herodias and Dalila."

While Thebom sang a wide repertoire which encompassed everything from Handel and Mozart to Verdi and Debussy, she was best known for her performances in the operas of Richard Wagner. Two Wagner roles with which she was particularly associated were Fricka in Die Walküre and Brangaene in Tristan und Isolde. She notably sang the latter role in the famous 1952 EMI recording made in London with Kirsten Flagstad, Ludwig Suthaus, and conductor Wilhelm Furtwängler. She is Didon in Les Troyens (world premiere 1957, conducted by Rafael Kubelik). In addition to several other recordings, she also appeared in two feature films during her career: Irish Eyes Are Smiling (1944) and The Great Caruso (1951).

After retiring from the stage in 1967, Thebom worked as an opera director in Atlanta for 6 years. She then taught singing both privately and on the music faculties of the University of Arkansas and San Francisco State University. She also co-founded the Opera Arts Training Program of the San Francisco Girls Chorus and served on the board of the Metropolitan Opera for nearly 40 years.

== Early life and education ==
Born in Monessen, Pennsylvania, in 1915, Thebom was the daughter of Swedish parents who had immigrated to the United States. Her year of birth is sometimes incorrectly given as 1918. She was raised in Canton, Ohio, where she studied ballet and was active as a singer in her church's choir. She continued to take ballet lessons into her 40s. She completed business college and then took a job as a secretary at an industrial firm in Canton.

In 1938, while working as a secretary, Thebom traveled with her parents to Sweden. During the voyage from America to Europe, she was overheard singing in the ship's lounge by pianist Kosti Vehanen. Vehanen was Marian Anderson's regular accompanist and vocal coach, and he was highly impressed with Thebom's talent. Accordingly, he arranged for Thebom to become a pupil of Giuseppe Boghetti in New York, who was Anderson's voice teacher, and also eventually got her signed with talent manager Sol Hurok who also managed Anderson's career. After Boghetti's death in July 1941, she studied with retired Metropolitan Opera mezzo-sopranos Edyth Walker and Margarete Matzenauer in New York City.

== Early career and performing at the Metropolitan Opera ==
Thebom's first prominent engagement as a performer came in November, 1941 when she made her first appearance as a soloist with the Philadelphia Orchestra and University of Pennsylvania Glee Club under conductor Eugene Ormandy at the Academy of Music in Philadelphia. She then spent the next three years performing in concerts and recitals throughout the United States. She also sang at the Academy of Music for her professional opera debut on November 28, 1944; portraying the role of Brangäne in Wagner's Tristan und Isolde for an out of town engagement of New York's Metropolitan Opera. She repeated that role for her first appearance on the New York stage at the Metropolitan Opera House on December 14, 1944.

Thebom sang with the Metropolitan Opera for the next 22 seasons, giving a total of 357 performances with the company during her career. Her most frequent role at the Met was Amneris in Giuseppe Verdi's Aida; a part she played in 80 performances opposite such Aidas as Gloria Davy, Florence Kirk, Zinka Milanov, Herva Nelli, Delia Rigal, Antonietta Stella, Renata Tebaldi, and Ljuba Welitsch among others. She also excelled in Wagner's operas at the Met, portraying the roles of Erda in Das Rheingold, Magdalene in Die Meistersinger von Nürnberg, Ortrud in Lohengrin, Venus in Tannhäuser, Waltraute in Götterdämmerung, and Fricka in both Die Walküre and Das Rheingold.

In 1951, Thebom appeared as Dorabella in the premiere of Alfred Lunt's popular English-language production of Wolfgang Amadeus Mozart's Così fan tutte at the Met. She also appeared in two United States premieres at the Met; singing the roles of Baba the Turk in Igor Stravinsky's The Rake's Progress (1953) and Adelaide in Richard Strauss' Arabella (1955). Other roles she performed at the Met included Adalgisa in Norma, Azucena in Il trovatore, Dalila in Samson and Delilah, Eboli in Don Carlos, Geneviève in Pelléas et Mélisande, Giulietta in The Tales of Hoffmann, Herodias in Salome, Klytämnestra in Elektra, Laura Adorno in La Gioconda, Marfa in Khovanshchina, Marina in Boris Godunov (1956), the Old Baroness in Vanessa, Orlofsky in Die Fledermaus, and the title roles in Carmen and Mignon. Her final performance at the Met was as the Countess in Tchaikovsky's The Queen of Spades on March 6, 1967; this was the only production that she appeared in at the Met after the company's 1966 move to the new opera house at Lincoln Center.

== Other performance work ==
Outside of the Metropolitan Opera, Thebom had actively performed as a guest artist with opera companies throughout the United States and abroad. In 1946, she made her stage debut in Chicago as Brangäne with the Chicago Opera Company. She made her debut with the San Francisco Opera (SFO) the following year singing Amneris to the Aida of Stella Roman. She was heard frequently in San Francisco through 1963; notably portraying the role of Mother Marie in the United States premiere of Francis Poulenc's Dialogues of the Carmelites at the SFO in 1957. Other roles she performed in San Francisco were Brangäne, Cherubino in The Marriage of Figaro, Carmen, Dalila, Fricka, Giulietta, Laura Adorno, Marina, Octavian in Der Rosenkavalier, and Orfeo in Orfeo ed Euridice. She also sang Dalila to the Samson of Giovanni Martinelli at the Philadelphia Civic Grand Opera Company in 1950.

Thebom made her European debut in 1950 as Dalila at the Royal Swedish Opera (RSO). She returned to the RSO several times, singing such roles as Amneris, Eboli and — in what The Times described as "a not especially successful attempt at a soprano role" — as Elisabeth in Tannhäuser. She made her first appearance in the UK with the Glyndebourne Festival Opera in the Summer of 1950 as Dorabella. In 1957 she came to London to sing Dido in the much lauded 1957 production of Hector Berlioz's Les Troyens at the Royal Opera House, Covent Garden. It was the first time that this opera was staged by a professional company. In this production she made effective use of her spectacularly long hair, allowing it to fall down her back as she ascended the funeral pyre at the end.

In 1957, at the pinnacle of the Cold War, Thebom became the first American to perform at the Bolshoi Theatre in Moscow, where she portrayed Carmen for 3 weeks. She soon after gave a concert tour of Russia. She also gave performances in Greece, including a concert in front of the Parthenon with thousands in attendance. In 1960, she appeared at the Dallas Opera as Ruggiero in a celebrated production of George Frideric Handel's Alcina, with Joan Sutherland in the title role. In 1964, Thebom portrayed the Countess Geschwitz in Alban Berg's Lulu for the Opera Group of Boston. She also portrayed Prince Orlofsky (1965 and 1967) and Brangäne (1967) with the Philadelphia Grand Opera Company.

== Post opera career ==
After her retirement from the Metropolitan Opera in 1967, Thebom sang periodically in concerts and recitals. She appeared in several recitals with soprano Eleanor Steber. In June, 1967, Thebom was appointed director of the opera division at the Atlanta Municipal Theatre. When that organization went bankrupt in 1969, she founded her own opera company: Atlanta's Southern Regional Opera. She remained General Director of that company until it ceased operations in 1973.

While working in Atlanta, Thebom began actively working as a voice teacher. She also appeared in summer theatre revivals of Broadway musicals in Atlanta portraying roles like the Mother Abbess in The Sound of Music. In 1973, she moved to Little Rock to join the music faculty at the University of Arkansas. She taught singing and was director of the opera program there until the Spring of 1980, when she was appointed director of the opera program at San Francisco State University (SFSU).

While teaching at SFSU and later privately, Thebom served as chair of the Pacific Region Metropolitan Opera National Council Auditions for fifteen years. In the late 1980s she co-founded the Opera Arts Training Program of the San Francisco Girls Chorus with Elizabeth Appling. She continued to lead that organization up into the early 2000s. Several of the girls who attended the program later became professional opera singers. Thebom also served on the board of the Metropolitan Opera from 1970–2008, and was a judge for the national level of the Miss America pageant.

Blanche Thebom died of heart failure at her home in San Francisco on March 23, 2010 at the age of 94.

== Recordings ==
- Blanche Thebom, mezzo-soprano: Arias from Don Carlos, La Gioconda, Tristan und Isolde, Das Rheingold, Die Walküre, Götterdämmerung and Samson et Dalila; songs of Hugo Wolf, and Gustav Mahler's Songs of a Wayfarer. Preiser 89559 CD
- Samson et Dalila (Camille Saint-Saëns), 1956, Set Svanholm, Blanche Thebom, Sigurd Björling, Herbert Sandberg, Royal Swedish Opera Orchestra and Chorus, Caprice; CAT: CAP 22054
- Tristan und Isolde (Richard Wagner), 1952, Kirsten Flagstad, Ludwig Suthaus, Blache Thebom, Dietrich Fischer-Dieskau, Philharmonia Orchestra and Chorus of the Royal Operahouse, Covent Garden. EMI Classics.
