= Folke Jonsson =

Swedish opera singer

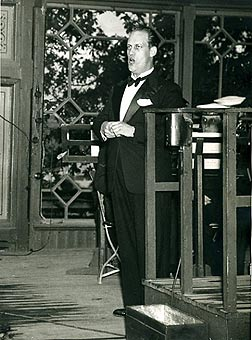
Folke Jonsson, photographed in 1939 in Skansen Sweden

Folke Henry Jonsson (9 June 1904 in Ängelholm Sweden - 7 December 1981 in Sollentuna) was a Swedish opera singer who sang leading bass roles primarily at the Royal Swedish Opera and in other Scandinavian opera houses for many years. He also appeared as one of the priests in Ingmar Bergman's film The Magic Flute (Trollflöjten) and as the Herald in Roberto Rossellini's film Giovanna d'Arco al rogo.

In 1945 he sang Old Florio in the premiere of Rosenberg's opera Lycksalighetens ö in Stockholm.

Recordings of some of Jonsson's live performances with the Royal Swedish Opera can be heard on Mozart at the Royal Swedish Opera 1952-1967 Vol. 6, (Caprice Records 22059); Birgit Nilsson: Rarities (Gala 624); and Set Svanholm Live (Preiser Records 90332).

Folke Jonsson was the grandfather of television presenter Ulrika Jonsson.
