= Hjördis Schymberg =

Swedish opera singer

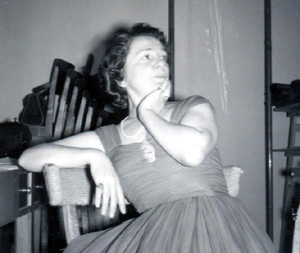
Hjördis Schymberg, after a concert in 1962

Hjördis Gunborg Schymberg (April 24, 1909 – September 8, 2008) was a Swedish coloratura and lyric soprano active on the opera stage and in concert halls between 1934 and 1968. One of the leading singers of the Royal Swedish Opera, she was awarded the title of Hovsångerska (Court Singer) in 1943, and in her later years became a distinguished voice teacher.

== Biography ==
Hjördis Schymberg was born on the island of Alnön on April 24, 1909, the fourth of five musically talented sisters. Her father worked in the local lumber mill and her mother was a seamstress. As a child, she played both the violin and piano and sang with the Gustavsberg children's orchestra. She and her sisters also sang in cafes and performed music to accompany silent films. At the age of 16, she had her own radio program, Tant Hjördis sjunger med barnen (Aunt Hjördis sings with children), but it was not until 1929 that she began formal vocal training with Brita von Vegesack. Three years later, she went to Stockholm where she studied under John Forsell, who was also the teacher of Jussi Björling. Schymberg and Bjorling were to sing together later, including a highly celebrated rendition of "O soave fanciulla", recorded in 1941. A scholarship gave her the opportunity for further study in Italy under Renato Bellini and Lina Pagliughi.

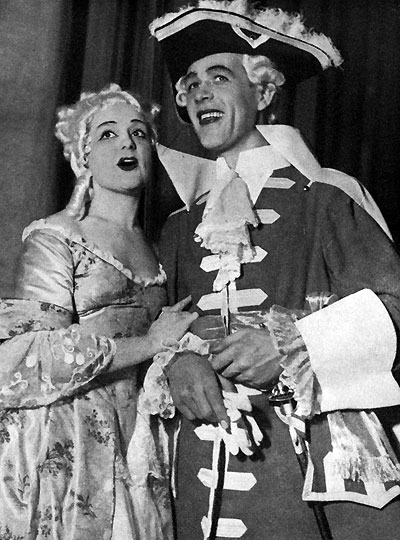
Schymberg as Fiordiligi (Così fan tutte) in the 1940s, with Hugo Hasslo

She made her stage debut in 1934 as Berthe in a matinée performance of Adolphe Adam's comic opera La poupée de Nuremberg. Later that year she sang Mimì to Björling's Rodolfo for their 1934 role debuts in La bohème and went on to sing with him over 100 times, including his last performance in Stockholm in 1960. She soon became one of the leading sopranos of the Royal Swedish Opera and also sang regularly in Copenhagen, Oslo, and Helsinki. She created the title role in Larsson's The Princess of Cyprus in 1937. However, her international career was delayed by World War II. Her first major engagement outside Scandinavia came in 1946 when she was scheduled to appear in London's Royal Albert Hall in a concert of arias by Handel, Mozart, Berwald and Delibes, conducted by Ernest Ansermet. Schymberg's American debut came in 1947 when she sang Susanna in Le nozze di Figaro at New York's Metropolitan Opera. The manager Edvard Johnson had heard her already back in 1938 and wanted her to appear at the Metropolitan. She was given a contract for the following season after her debut in 1947 but she never returned to the Metropolitan. She also appeared there in the same season as Gilda in Rigoletto. A review of her Met debut in The New York Times described her:

Comely, petite and graceful, she was an ideal Susanna to the eye. Her impersonation was refined and filled with the spirit of youth. She brought the needed vivacity and sly humor to her interpretation and gave it real human appeal in a natural and unaffected way that won immediate favor with the large audience.

She went on to give a series of concerts in the United States in 1947 and also appeared in Havana, Hamburg and Riccione later on where she sang in Rigoletto opposite Giuseppe Di Stefano as the Duke of Mantua. Her Covent Garden debut came in 1951 as Violetta in La traviata.

Schymberg retired from the Royal Swedish Opera company in 1959, but continued to perform in operas, concerts, art song recitals and recordings until 1968 when she gave her farewell performance at the Royal Swedish Opera. In her later years she taught singing at the Royal College of Music in Stockholm. Amongst her pupils were several prominent Scandinavian opera singers including Gösta Winbergh, Sylvia Lindenstrand, Laila Andersson-Palme, and Solveig Kringelborn. In 1997 she donated Schymbergsgården, her childhood home in Alnön, to the Schymbergsgården Foundation which she established for the benefit of young singers and musicians. Schymbergsgården is now a venue for summer concerts and master classes.

Schymberg died in Stockholm in the early hours of September 8, 2008, at the age of 99.

The Hjördis Schymberg Foundation has announced its first singing competition, open to young professionals, with the final stage planned for Sundsvall in October 2018.

== Repertoire ==
Schymberg's signature role was Violetta in La traviata, which she sang over 140 times between 1939 and 1968. The BBC also filmed her in costume singing arias from the opera for a 1951 episode of Picture Page. In 1945 she sang Zephyr in the premiere of Rosenberg's opera Lycksalighetens ö. Over the course of her career she sang over 50 other roles including:

- Berthe in La poupée de Nuremberg
- Blonde in Die Entführung aus dem Serail
- Butterfly in Madama Butterfly
- Countess Almaviva in Le nozze di Figaro
- Fiordiligi in Così fan tutte
- Gilda in Rigoletto
- Giulietta in Les contes d'Hoffmann
- Hélène in La belle Hélène
- Juliette in Roméo et Juliette
- Madeleine in Le postillon de Lonjumeau
- Manon in Massenet's Manon
- Manon in Puccini's Manon Lescaut
- Marguerite in Faust
- Marzelline in Fidelio
- Mimì in La bohème
- Nedda in Pagliacci
- Olympia in Les contes d'Hoffmann
- Oscar in Un ballo in maschera
- Rosina in Il barbiere di Siviglia
- Susanna in Le nozze di Figaro
- Thaïs in Thaïs
- Zerbinetta in Ariadne auf Naxos

== Recordings ==
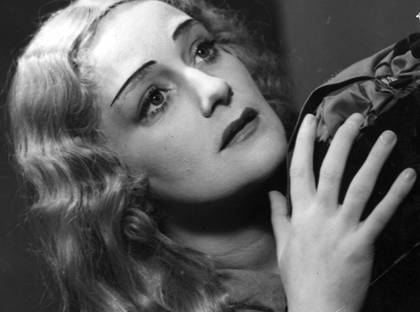
Schymberg in 1942

In 1975 the Unique Opera Records Corporation released on LP the complete live recording of La traviata performed at the Swedish Royal Opera on 29 August 1939 with Schymberg as Violetta and Jussi Björling as Alfredo in his last assumption of the role. Excerpts from that recording can still be found in some CD compilations such as The Jussi Björling Series – Radamès, Alfredo, Roméo (Bluebell ABCD 103). Other CD recordings featuring Schymberg include:

- Gounod: Roméo et Juliette (Jussi Björling, Hjördis Schymberg, Leon Björker and Sigurd Björling). Recorded live in 1940 at the Royal Swedish Opera. Label: Bluebell ABCD 088
- Royal Swedish Opera Archives Vol 1 – Il trovatore and Manon Lescaut (Schymberg sings with Jussi Björling in Manon Lescaut, recorded live in 1959). Label: Caprice Records, CAP 22051
- Royal Swedish Opera Archives Vol 6 – Mozart at the Royal Swedish Opera 1952–1967 (Schymberg sings in excerpts from Don Giovanni, Le nozze di Figaro, and Die Zauberflöte). Label: Caprice Records CAP 22059
- Hjördis Schymberg, Soprano (arias by Handel, Gluck, Mozart, Weber, Rossini, Scarlatti, Donizetti, Verdi, Gounod, Bizet, Dvorák, and Puccini). Label: Bluebell ABCD 105

== Sources ==
- Forsling, Göran, Review: 'The Jussi Björling Series – Radamès, Alfredo, Roméo, MusicWeb International, January 2007.
- Henrysson, Harald and Flaster, Sue, Liner notes: The Bjorling Collection, Vol. 3: Opera Arias and Duets (1936–1944) Naxos Records, 2003.
- MetOpera Database, Schymberg, Hjördis (Soprano) – performance record at the Metropolitan Opera.
- Östlund, Björn, 2009.
- Shaman, William et al. More EJS: Discography of the Edward J. Smith Recordings, Greenwood Publishing Group, 1999. ISBN 0-313-29835-1
- Schymbergsgården Foundation (Stiftelsen Schymbergsgården), Hjördis Schymberg, 2008.
- Strauss, Noel, "Swedish Soprano Bows in Figaro", The New York Times, February 16, 1947, p. 59, reprinted on the MetOpera Database.
- Sveriges Radio P2, Hjördis Schymberg Special 29 December 2008
