= Alnön =

Island in Sundsvall Municipality, Sweden

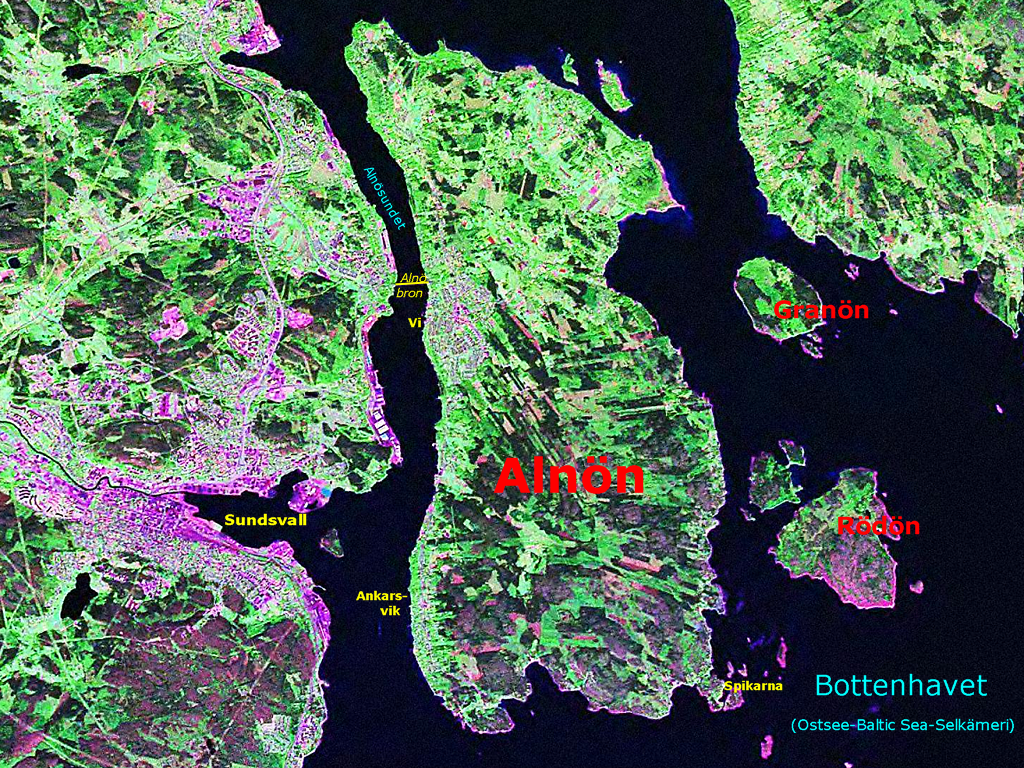
- False color satellite image of Alnö outside Sundsvall in the Gulf of Bothnia.
- Interactive map of Alnön

Geography
- Location: Gulf of Bothnia
- Coordinates: 62°24′N 17°28′E
- Area: 67.79 km^{2} (26.17 sq mi)

Administration
- Sweden
- County: Västernorrland

Alnön is an island in the Gulf of Bothnia just outside Sundsvall in Medelpad, Sweden. It has an area of 67.79 km^{2} and a permanent population of 8,417 (as of 31 December 2010), although its summertime inhabitants are about twice that number. Most of the island's inhabitants work in Sundsvall and other towns on the mainland.

The island is 15 km long and 6 km wide on the widest spot. It is connected to the mainland by a 1,042-meter-long (3,419 ft) bridge, which was the longest bridge in Sweden when it was opened in 1964.

Evidences of habitation on the island predate the Viking Age, and there are several tumuli on the island from that period. The old stone church near the modern bridge was built in the 12th century. The island saw a population boom in the second half of the 19th century, due to the development of steam-driven sawmills. In 1850 the island had 950 inhabitants, mainly farmers and fishermen, but by 1900 the population had grown to almost 7,000, following the establishment of 18 sawmills between 1860 and 1897.

As result of decreased foreign trade during World War II apatite was mined in Alnön from 1943 to 1945. Apatite was separated by flotation but results were meager. While the separation process had improved in 1945 the end of the war the same year meant also apatite mining became unprofitable.

== Geology ==
Alnö was affected some 570 million years ago by a massive volcanic eruption. The northeastern part of the island is rich in carbonate minerals, and it is one of few areas in the world with a carbonatite volcanic complex. Its chemistry is very different from the ordinary granitic rock that form the rest of the island, resulting in a number of unusual minerals, such as baryte and aegirine.

The most famous of the rocks of Alnön is the alnoite, named from the Island, which is a lamprophyre chiefly composed of biotite or phlogopite and melilite as essential minerals, commonly with olivine, calcite and clinopyroxene. Perovskite, apatite, nepheline and garnet may also be present. Diamonds have also been found on Alnön, but only in very small amounts.

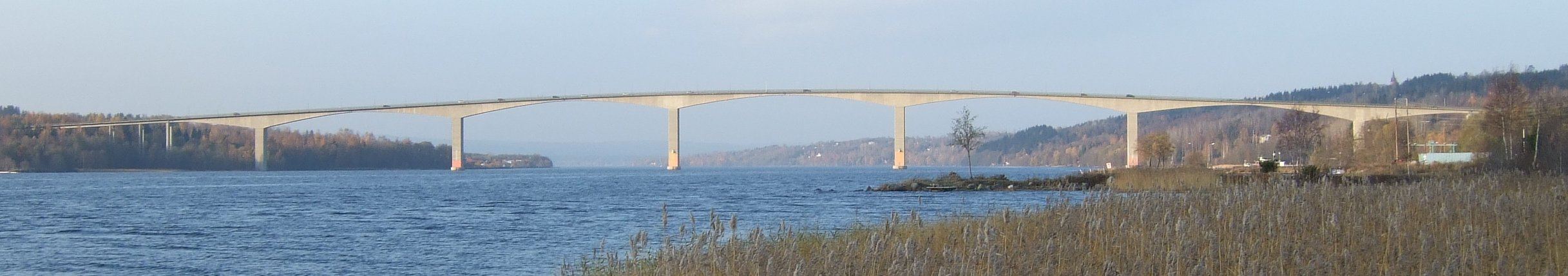
Alnöbron connects Alnön with the mainland, and was Sweden's longest bridge when it opened in 1964.

== Sport ==
- Alnö IF

== Notable citizens ==
- Vilma Abrahamsson, Football player
- Gunnar Hellström, Director
- Tina Nordlund, Football player
- Hjördis Schymberg, Opera singer
- Andreas Yngvesson, Football player
- Helen Sjöholm, Singer and actress
