= Helen Traubel =

American opera singer (1899–1972)

- Traubel in a 1945 publicity photograph for Columbia Records
- Born: Helen Francesca Traubel; June 16, 1899; St. Louis, Missouri, U.S.
- Died: July 28, 1972 (aged 73); Santa Monica, California, U.S.
- Occupation: Opera singer
- Years active: 1937–1967
- Spouse(s): Louis Franklin Carpenter (1922–1938) (divorced); William L. Bass (1938–1972) (her death)

Helen Francesca Traubel (June 16, 1899 – July 28, 1972) was an American opera and concert singer. A dramatic soprano, she was best known for her Wagnerian roles, especially those of Brünnhilde and Isolde.

Born and raised in St. Louis, Missouri, she began her career as a concert singer and went on to sing at the Metropolitan Opera from 1937 to 1953. Starting in the 1950s, she also developed a career as a nightclub and cabaret singer as well as appearing in television, films and musical theatre. Traubel spent her later years in Santa Monica, California, where she died at the age of 73.

== Early life ==
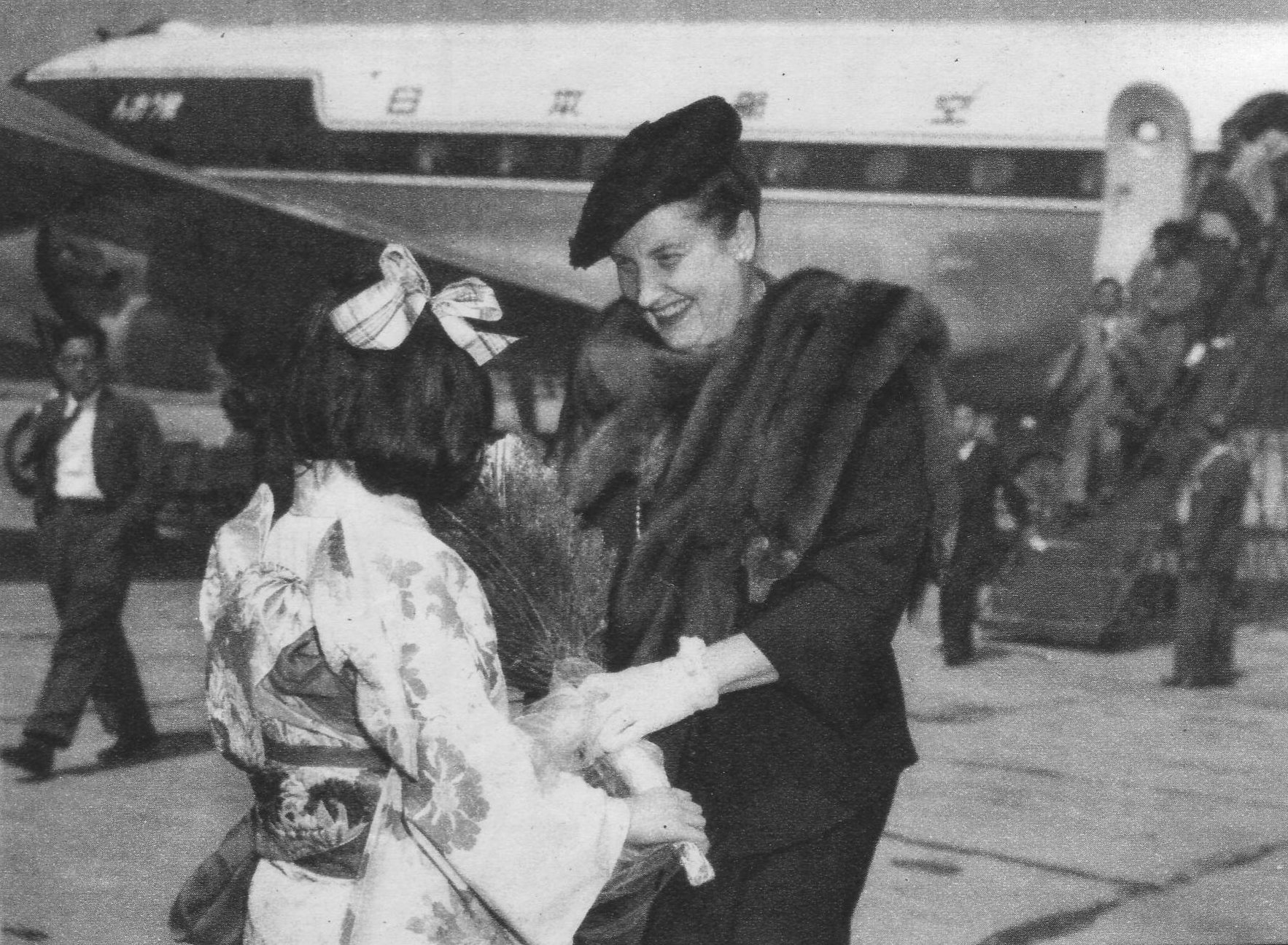
Helen Traubel at Chitose Air Base, 1952

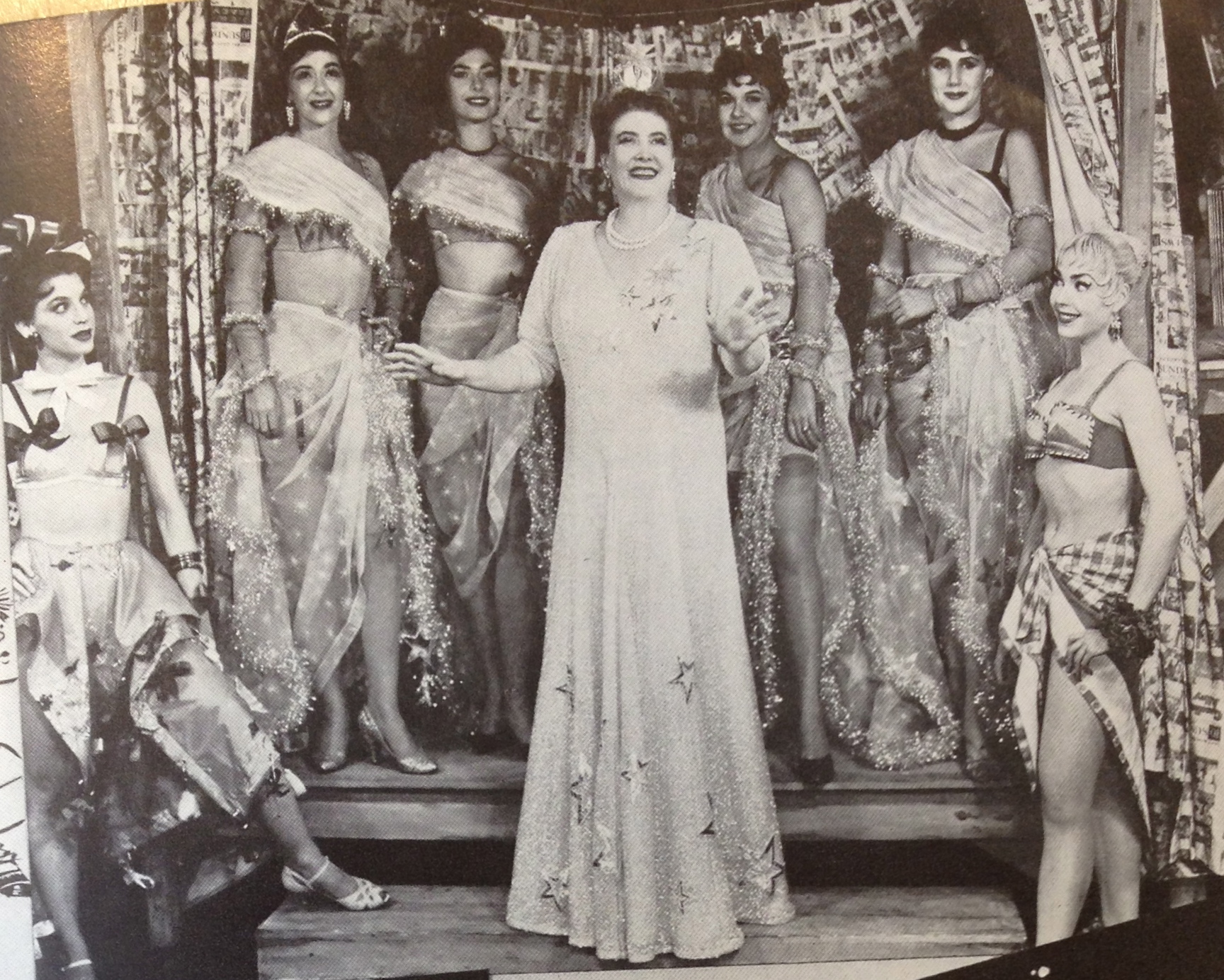
Helen Traubel as Fauna

Traubel was born in St. Louis, Missouri to a prosperous family of German descent. She was the daughter of Otto Ferdinand Traubel, a pharmacist, and Clara Traubel (née Stuhr). She studied singing in her native city with Louise Vetta-Karst and later in New York City with Giuseppe Boghetti among other teachers. She made her debut as a concert singer with the Saint Louis Symphony Orchestra in 1923, and in 1926 she received an offer to join the Metropolitan Opera company after performing the Liebestod from Wagner's Tristan und Isolde at the Lewisohn Stadium under conductor Rudolph Ganz. She turned down the Met's offer in order to continue with her studies and career as a concert singer.

== Opera career ==
On May 12, 1937, Traubel made her debut appearance on the opera stage, after composer Walter Damrosch asked her to sing the role of Mary Rutledge in the world premiere of his opera The Man Without a Country at the Metropolitan Opera. She made her debut with the Chicago City Opera Company later that year, appearing there until the company went bankrupt in 1939. In 1940, she joined the roster of the Chicago Opera Company, remaining a member of that company until it too went bankrupt in 1946. She made her debut with the San Francisco Opera as Brünnhilde in Die Walküre on October 9, 1945, with Lauritz Melchior as Siegmund, Margaret Harshaw as Fricka, and William Steinberg conducting; she made several further appearances there during 1945 and 1947.

Since the Metropolitan already had two first-class Wagnerian sopranos, Kirsten Flagstad and Marjorie Lawrence, Traubel at first had difficulty finding her niche at the Met. Her debut as a regular member of the company was as Sieglinde in Die Walküre in 1939, the only standard role which she had previously sung, at the Chicago Opera. Flagstad left the US in 1941 to visit her homeland of Norway and could not return due to the war in Europe. The same year, Lawrence was stricken with polio and her career was curtailed.

On February 22, 1941, Arturo Toscanini conducted Traubel and tenor Lauritz Melchior in excerpts from Wagnerian operas, including act 1, scene 3 of Die Walküre on the live radio broadcast concert of the NBC Symphony Orchestra. RCA Victor later released recordings of excerpts from the concert, as well as a classic studio recording of Traubel in Brünnhilde's Immolation Scene from Götterdämmerung. Traubel later triumphed in Tannhäuser and in Tristan und Isolde. She was renowned for her powerful voice, which was often described as a "gleaming sword"; her endurance and purity of tone were unsurpassed, especially as Brünnhilde and Isolde. Although she longed to sing Italian opera, she never appeared in an Italian opera performance onstage, although she often included Italian arias and songs in her recital repertoire. Towards the end of her career at the Met, she added the Marschallin in Richard Strauss's Der Rosenkavalier briefly to her repertoire.

In 1948, while her Met career was at its height, US President Harry S. Truman contracted her to act as an "advisor" to his daughter, Margaret, who was hoping to launch a career as a classical singer. Traubel's 1959 autobiography, St. Louis Woman, contains an account of the three years she spent in the role, and how in the end she felt it had adversely affected her stature in the music world to have her name associated with "such a musical aspirant" of questionable talent.

Traubel's association with the Metropolitan Opera ended in 1953; General Manager Rudolf Bing chose not to renew her contract after expressing disapproval of her radio and TV appearances alongside the likes of Jimmy Durante, and her wish to expand her lucrative career in major supper and night clubs. Traubel went on to appear at the Copacabana, as well as in many cameo television roles. After her Met career, she appeared on Broadway in the Rodgers and Hammerstein financial failure, Pipe Dream, playing a bordello madame with a heart of gold and the voice of Isolde. Additionally, she appeared in the films Deep in My Heart, The Ladies Man and Gunn. She also appeared opposite Groucho Marx as Katisha in a Bell Telephone presentation in an abridged performance of Gilbert and Sullivan's The Mikado. Traubel's last night club appearance was with Jimmy Durante at Harrah's Lake Tahoe in 1964.

== Personal life ==
A baseball fan, Traubel was once the part owner of her hometown team, the St. Louis Browns. She wrote a mystery short story, The Ptomaine Canary, which was serialized in US newspapers via Associated Press) in 1950. A full-length follow-up, The Metropolitan Opera Murders (1951), was ghostwritten by Harold Q. Masur and features a soprano heroine, Elsa Vaughan, who helps solve the mystery.

Her later years were devoted to caring for her second husband and former business manager, William L. Bass, whom she had married in 1938. (Her first husband, was Louis Franklin Carpenter, a St. Louis car salesman. The couple married in 1922 but soon separated.) Traubel died of a heart attack in Santa Monica, California, aged 73, and was interred in the Westwood Village Memorial Park Cemetery in Los Angeles.

For her contribution to the recording industry, Traubel has a star on the Hollywood Walk of Fame at 6422 Hollywood Blvd. In 1994 she was inducted into the St. Louis Walk of Fame.

== Sources ==
- Gettysburg Times (via Associated Press), "Helen Traubel In Tiff With Met: Won't Sign", September 29, 1953, p. 6; accessed October 31, 2010.
- Hischak, Thomas S. "Traubel, Helen", The Rodgers and Hammerstein Encyclopedia, Greenwood Publishing Group, 2007, p. 297; ISBN 0-313-34140-0
- McHenry, Robert (ed.), "Traubel, Helen", Famous American Women: A Biographical Dictionary from Colonial Times to the Present, Courier Dover Publications, 1983, p. 416; ISBN 0-486-24523-3
- Metropolitan Opera Archives, Traubel, Helen (soprano), MetOpera Database; accessed October 31, 2010.
- Montreal Gazette (via Associated Press), "Former Met Star Helen Traubel Dead", July 31, 1972, p. 14; accessed October 31, 2010.
- San Francisco Opera Performance Archives, Helen Traubel Archived March 5, 2012, at the Wayback Machine; accessed October 31, 2010.
- Sicherman, Barbara, and Green, Carol Hurd (eds), "Traubel, Helen Francesca", Notable American Women: The modern period, Volume 4, p. 697, Harvard University Press, 1980; ISBN 0-674-62733-4
- Star-News (via United Press International), "Helen Traubel, Former Opera Diva, Dies", July 31, 1972, p. 18; accessed October 31, 2010.
- Time, "Happy Heroine" (cover story), November 11, 1946; accessed October 31, 2010.
- Time, "Murder at the Met?", April 24, 1950; accessed October 31, 2010.
- Traubel, Helen and Hubler, Richard Gibson, St. Louis Woman, University of Missouri Press, 1999; ISBN 0-8262-1237-9
- Youngstown Vindicator (via Associated Press), "Helen Traubel Says Role with Margaret 'Hurt' Her", December 23, 1958, p. 11; accessed October 31, 2010.
