= Giuseppe Boghetti =

American voice teacher and tenor

Giuseppe Boghetti (born Joseph Bogash; August 24 or September 28, 1892 – 5 July 1941) was an American voice teacher and tenor. He was the teacher of several famous American opera singers, including Marian Anderson, Edythe Johnson, Jan Peerce, Blanche Thebom, and Helen Traubel.

== Life and career ==
Boghetti was born as Yossell Bogash into a Jewish family in Nemyriv, Ukraine (then in the Russian Empire). He was one of 17 children (eight surviving) of Louis (Jehuda), a rabbi and cantor born in Berdychiv, and Anna (Channa Korenzvit), from Simferopol, Crimea. The family immigrated to the United States in 1896.

He trained at the Milan Conservatory in Italy, where he changed his name to something that sounded Italian in the hopes that it would help bolster his career. He appeared as a concert tenor in several European cities but was never able to gain enough momentum to make a full-time living as a singer. He accordingly returned to the United States in 1918 where he opened studios in both his native city and New York City. He continued to teach in both cities up until his death in 1941.

In 1919, at the age of 23, Boghetti began teaching the great American contralto Marian Anderson. He remained Anderson's teacher, trusted advisor and friend up until his death from a stroke 22 years later.
