= Ludwig Suthaus =

German tenor

Ludwig Suthaus (12 December 1906 – 7 September 1971) was a German operatic heldentenor.

== Life ==
Born in Cologne Suthaus was a stonemason's apprentice when his singing talent was first discovered. He subsequently started his voice studies at the age of seventeen in his hometown of Cologne. His teacher, Julius Lenz, originally mistook him for a baritone, but in 1928 Suthaus debuted as a tenor in Aachen in the role of Walther von Stolzing in Richard Wagner's Die Meistersinger von Nürnberg. From 1932 to 1941, he was engaged in Stuttgart, but was fired in 1942 because he would not join the Nazi party.

Suthaus subsequently got a new contract at the Berlin State Opera. After the war, in 1949, he switched from the State Opera - now based in East Berlin - to the "Städtische Oper" which was based in West Berlin, and remained a member of that company until the end of his career.

Since the end of the forties, Suthaus appeared regularly at the Vienna State Opera and as guest at the Royal Opera House Covent Garden, La Scala, in Paris, Stuttgart, the Bavarian State Opera in Munich, in San Francisco and at Hamburg State Opera.

Beginning in 1943, he regularly appeared at the Bayreuth Festival where he sang Loge in Das Rheingold, Siegmund in Die Walküre and Walther von Stolzing in Die Meistersinger von Nürnberg, which was recorded (1943), Hermann Abendroth conducting.

Suthaus was one of Wilhelm Furtwängler's favorite singers toward the end of Furtwängler's life. With Furtwängler, Suthaus sang (Berlin, 1947) and recorded Tristan und Isolde (1952); Der Ring des Nibelungen as Siegfried (1953); and Die Walküre as Siegmund (1954) (Furtwängler's last opera recording).

He had to quit his career suddenly after a car accident, and died in Berlin at 64 years of age.

== Voice ==
To some, Ludwig Suthaus's voice did not have the vocal energy of Lauritz Melchior, but sounded melancholic; however, it was not without deep-felt lyrical expressiveness when it was required. He was not perceived as a youthful hero, but was able to give some of his best performances when he sang broken characters. In his time he was not as widely appreciated as his contemporaries Max Lorenz or Ramón Vinay.

Today, his performance as Tristan in the Furtwängler recording is considered one of the best on record, next to those of Melchior, Windgassen and Jon Vickers.

== Recordings ==
- Wagner, Die Meistersinger von Nürnberg, Paul Schöffler, Friedrich Dalberg, Erich Kunz, Fritz Krenn, Ludwig Suthaus (Walther), Erich Witte, Hilde Scheppan, Camilla Kallab – Hermann Abendroth, conductor: Bayreuther Festspiele, 16 July 1943 (Preiser 90174 4CD mono)
- Wagner, Tristan und Isolde, Ludwig Suthaus (Tristan), Gottlob Frick, Margarete Bäumer, Karl Wolfram, Erna Westenberger – Franz Konwitschny, conductor: Leipzig Gewandhaus Orchestra, 21–23 October 1950 (Walhall Eternity Series WLCD 0118 3CD mono)
- Wagner, Tristan und Isolde, Ludwig Suthaus (Tristan), Kirsten Flagstad, Blanche Thebom, Josef Greindl, Dietrich Fischer-Dieskau, Rudolf Schock – Wilhelm Furtwängler, conductor: Philharmonia Orchestra, London, 10-21 & 23 June 1952 (EMI Classics 58587326 4CD mono)
- Richard Wagner, Der Ring de Nibelungen, as Siegfried, RAI, 1953, Wilhelm Furtwängler.

== Literature ==
- Kesting, Jürgen: Die großen Sänger des 20. Jahrhunderts, Cormoran, Munich 1993, ISBN 3-517-07987-1
