= Set Svanholm =

Swedish operatic tenor

Set Svanholm in an advertisement by his agent, William L. Stein, for the 1946-1947 season in New York.

Set Svanholm (2 September 1904 – 4 October 1964) was a Swedish operatic tenor, considered the leading Tristan and Siegfried of the first decade following World War II.

== Life and career ==
Svanholm began his musical career at 17 as a precentor, elementary school teacher, and organist. He then studied at the Royal University College of Music in Stockholm and took singing lessons from the famous baritone John Forsell, who also taught Aksel Schiøtz and Jussi Björling.

He made his operatic debut as a baritone (Stockholm, 1930), singing the role of Silvio in Pagliacci. He sang as a baritone for several years. Then in 1936, after further study, he debuted as a tenor, singing the role of Radamès in Aida. His first Wagnerian tenor roles (Lohengrin and Siegfried) followed in 1937, along with Lemminkäinen in the premiere of Lars-Erik Larsson's The Princess of Cyprus the same year.

Svanholm sang regularly at the New York Metropolitan Opera (1946-1956), the Vienna State Opera (1949-1954), and The Royal Opera House in London (1948–57). He became the director of the Royal Swedish Opera in 1956, a post he held until 1963.

== Recordings ==
- Set Svanholm sings Wagner - Arias and scenes from Lohengrin, Tannhäuser, Die Meistersinger von Nürnberg, Die Walküre and Tristan und Isolde (Set Svanholm, tenor, RCA Orch; Frieder Weissmann, cond. & Philharmonia Orch; Karl Böhm, cond.) Preiser Records 89535
- Wagner: Das Rheingold, the famous Solti recording with George London. Svanholm plays Loge.
- Wagner: Die Walküre - Highlights (Set Svanholm, Birgit Nilsson, Josef Greindl.) Preiser Records 93447
- Wagner: Die Walküre - Act 1 (Set Svanholm, Kirsten Flagstad, Arnold van Mill; Hans Knappertsbusch, 1957.) Published by Decca
- Wagner: Die Walküre - Act I (Set Svanholm, Birgit Nilsson, Josef Greindl; Hans Schmidt-Isserstedt cond.) Bella Voce 107.010
- Wagner: Siegfried - (Set Svanholm, Kirsten Flagstad, Josef Hermann, Ludwig Weber; Wilhelm Furtwängler cond.) various releases
- Set Svanholm Live - Excerpts from Die Meistersinger von Nürnberg (recorded live at the Royal Theater, Stockholm, 1939; Nils Grevillius cond.), Aida (recorded live at the Royal Theater, Stockholm, 1939; Leo Blech cond.), and Götterdämmerung (recorded live at the Bayreuth Festspielhaus, 1942; Karl Elmendorff cond.) Preiser Records 90332
- Mahler: Das Lied von der Erde (Set Svanholm, Elena Nikolaidi, New York Philharmonic Orchestra; Bruno Walter cond.) Music & Arts Programs Of America 950
- Saint-Saëns: Samson et Dalila (Set Svanholm, Blanche Thebom, Sigurd Björling, Royal Swedish Opera Orchestra and Chorus, Herbert Sandberg cond.), 1956; Caprice; CAT: CAP 22054
