= Alnön old church =

Church building in Sundsvall Municipality, Sweden

Coordinates: 62°26′52″N 17°24′19″E

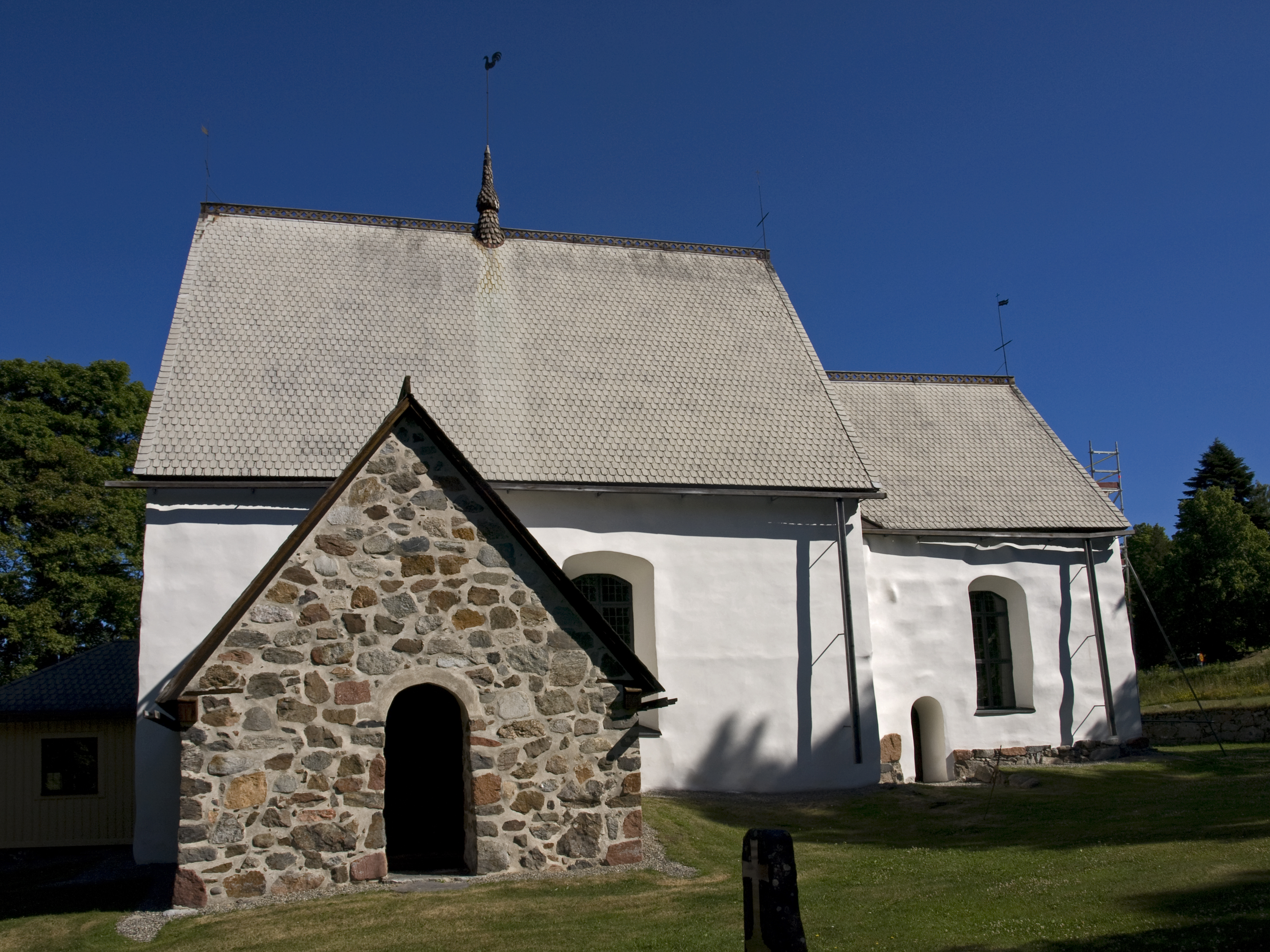
The church from the southwest

Alnön's old church (Swedish: Alnö gamla kyrka) is a medieval church on the island of Alnön, Sundsvall Municipality, Sweden.

The oldest part of the church probably originates from the 13th century. The church is mentioned in 1314 as subordinate to Skön, and Alnön became its own pastorate only in 1892. It is thought that the sacristy and the cemetery were built in the 15th century. In 1778, a wooden porch was added. The windows in the southern and eastern walls were enlarged in the 18th century.

It was built by local inhabitants. By 1863, the church became too small, and Alnön new church was built nearby. After that, the old church was disused and only restored in the 1927 under direction of Erik Salvén. Medieval frescoes from around 1500 have been preserved. The church used to keep a wooden baptismal font made in the 13th century, however, it has been moved to the new church.

The weathercock on top of the church was voted in 2008 to be the Church Cock of the Year in Sweden.

The building is protected as a cultural heritage monument at the regional level.
