= Camilla Kallab =

German-Austrian operatic mezzo-soprano

- Born: 22 December 1906; Brüx, Austria
- Died: 3 September 1967 (aged 60); Berlin, Germany
- Education: Musikhochschule Frankfurt
- Occupation: Operatic mezzo-soprano
- Organizations: Staatsoper Dresden; Leipzig Opera

Camilla Kallab (22 December 1906 – 3 September 1967) was an Austrian and later German operatic mezzo-soprano who appeared internationally.

== Life and career ==
Born in Brüx, today Most, Kallab studied at the Musikhochschule Frankfurt and in Berlin. She made her debut in 1930 at the Theater Karlsruhe and was engaged by the Staatsoper Dresden from 1930 to 1934. At the 1932 Munich Opera Festival, she caused a sensation as Adriano in Wagner's Rienzi. In Dresden in 1933, she sang Adelaide in the world premiere of Arabella by Richard Strauss. She made guest appearances in 1934 in Amsterdam, at the Teatro Colón in Buenos Aires and in Die Walküre at the opera in Rio de Janeiro. From 1934 to 1944 she was engaged at the Leipzig Opera. There she was involved in two world premieres – on 12 May 1941 in Winfried Zillig's Windsbraut and on 1 November 1942 in Franz Petyrek's Garden of Paradise. She appeared at the Vienna State Opera on 19 September 1938 as Fricka in Wagner's Das Rheingold and on 22 May 1946 as Bizet's Carmen. During World War II, she sang at the Bayreuth Festivals (Waltraute and First Norn in Götterdämmerung and Magdalene in Die Meistersinger von Nürnberg), as well as a Carmen guest appearance in 1944 at the Vienna Volksoper.

From 1946 to 1949, Kallab was engaged at the Hessisches Staatstheater Wiesbaden, and from 1949 at the Komische Oper Berlin. In 1946 she was seen and heard in Graz. Guest appearances took her to Berlin, Brussels and Amsterdam as well as to the Teatro Nacional de São Carlos of Lisbon.

Her repertoire included Wager's Ortrud in Lohengrin and Kundry in Parsifal, Verdi's Eboli in Don Carlos and Amneris in Aida, Strauss roles including Octavian in Der Rosenkavalier, the Nurse in Die Frau ohne Schatten, Herodias in Salome and Klytämnestra in Elektra, as well as Silla in Pfitzner's Palestrina. At the Komische Oper Berlin, she took on mostly character roles, Marcellina in Le nozze di Figaro, Berta in Il barbiere di Siviglia, Agnes in The Bartered Bride, the Forester in The Cunning Little Vixen and Zita in Gianni Schicchi.

Parallel to her stage performances, she was a concert singer. She sang, for example, under the direction of Fritz Busch, Wilhelm Furtwängler and Richard Strauss. A recording of a Bayreuth Meistersinger performance from 1943, with her as Magdalene, was released on HMV-Electrola in 1976. Her partners were Paul Schöffler, Ludwig Suthaus, Erich Kunz, Frederick Dalberg, Erich Witte and Hilde Scheppan, with the Bayreuth Festival choir and orchestra conducted by Hermann Abendroth. She also appeared at a 1942 Bayreuth recording of Götterdämmerung.

Kallab died in Berlin on 3 September 1967, at the age of 60.
