= Anemotis =

Anemotis (Ancient Greek: Ἀνεμῶτις) was in Greek mythology an epithet of the goddess Athena, in which she was described as the subduer of the winds, that is, the Anemoi. Under this name she was worshipped and had a temple at Mothone in Messenia. It was believed to have been built by Diomedes, because in consequence of his prayers the goddess had subdued the storms which did damage to the country.
