= Prinsessan av Cypern (Pacius) =

Swedish-language opera

Prinsessan av Cypern (The Princess of Cyprus) is a four-act fairy opera by Fredrik Pacius, with a Swedish libretto by Zacharias Topelius. It is sometimes referred to as a singspiel or simply as incidental music to the play.

== Performance history ==
The piece was first performed at the inauguration of the New Theatre (now Swedish Theatre) in Helsinki on 28 November 1860, where the Kullervo Overture by Filip von Schantz was also performed. After the New Theatre burnt down the Princess of Cyprus was performed again at its re-opening.

Although occasionally performed after Pacius’s death, The Princess of Cyprus was neglected for many years. In the summer of 2001, a concert version was played at the 21st Finnish-Swedish Song Festival in Espoo, conducted by Ulf Söderblom, who also led a BIS recording for CD the following year. In 2008, a stage production was mounted in Helsinki at the Swedish Theatre.

Lars-Erik Larsson wrote an opera on the same libretto in the 1930s.

== Background ==
Topelius’ Swedish language play the Princess of Cyprus is based on an episode in the Kalevala with Lemminkäinen and Kyllikki. Lemminkäinen journeys to Cyprus and carries off Princess Chryseis back to Finland. Later a blind shepherd kills Lemminkäinen, who descends to Tuonela, but his mother brings her son back to life through prayer.

Topelius asked Pacius to make the Princess of Cyprus into a full dramatic opera, but Pacius was not interested. The music is in the style of mid 19th century romantic composers. There are elements of Finnish music in a 5/4 song and a romance 'Barn av Finland' ('Child of Finland').
