= Prinsessan av Cypern (Larsson) =

Opera in four acts by Lars-Erik Larsson

- Opera by Lars-Erik Larsson
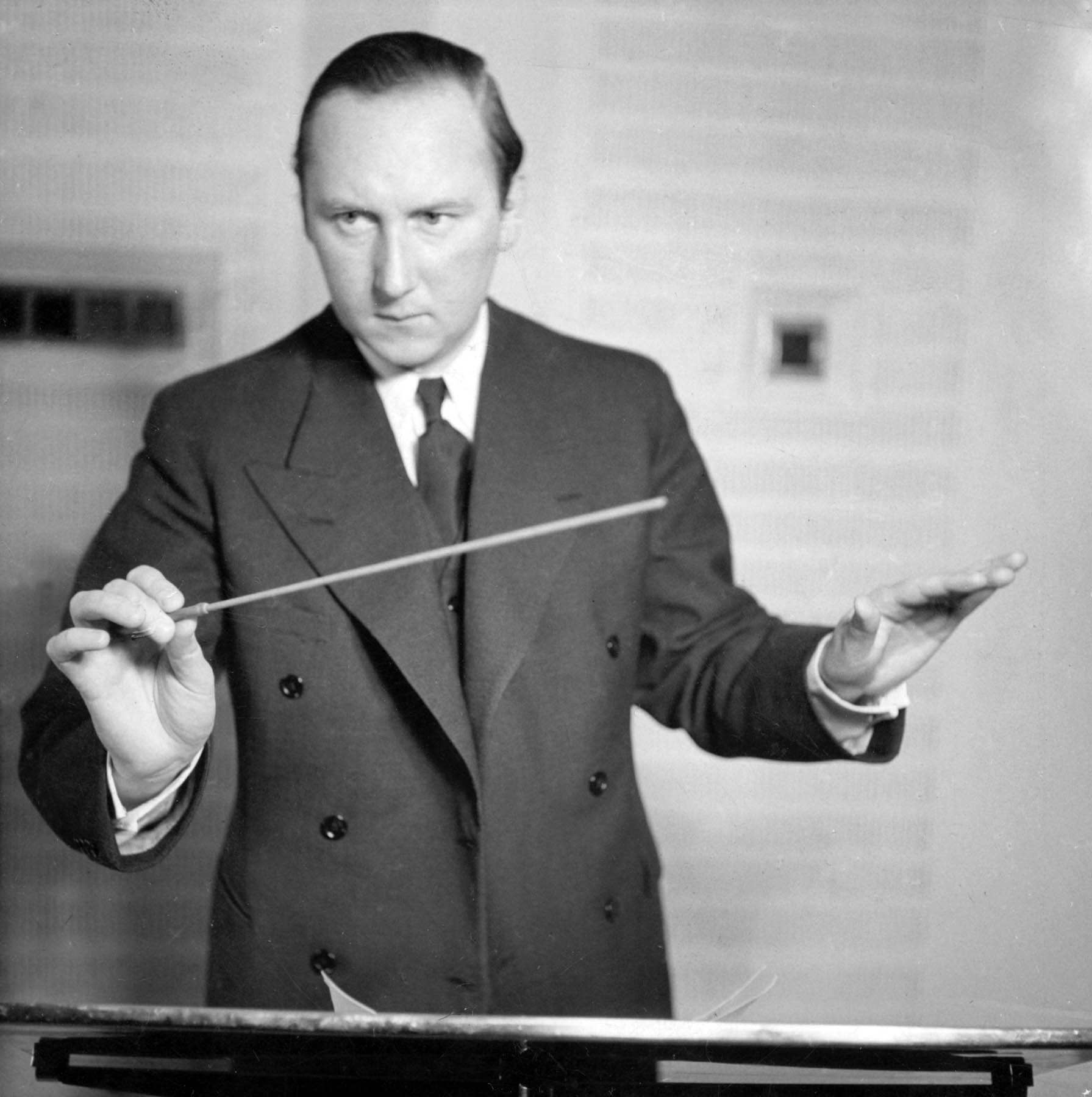
- The composer
- Translation: The Princess of Cyprus
- Librettist: Zacharias Topelius
- Language: Swedish
- Premiere: 29 April 1937; Royal Swedish Opera, Stockholm

Prinsessan av Cypern (The Princess of Cyprus), Op. 9, is an opera in four acts written from 1931 to 1936 by the Swedish composer Lars-Erik Larsson. It re-uses the Swedish-language libretto by the Finnish writer Zacharias Topelius for the opera Prinsessan av Cypern composed by Fredrik Pacius. Larsson's opera premiered in Stockholm on in 29 April 1937, but was withdrawn subsequently by the composer.

== Background ==
The libretto by Zacharias Topelius is based on elements of the Finnish national epic Kalevala. Topelius combined part of the 11th song concerning Lemminkäinen's attempts to win the proud virgin Kyllikki with other elements from the Kalevala, including Lemminkäinen's visit to Tuonela. There are parallels to the Iliad and Odyssey, and Topelius uses the conflict of cultures between the noble Greeks and the barbaric Nordic countries.

Larsson wrote Prinsessan av Cypern, from 1931 to 1936. While inspired by past composers, the music is often unmistakably by Larsson. The shepherd's revenge song is inspired by rune singing, and Anemotis's view of Hellas has exotic contours. Larsson gives each character a leitmotif, worked into dramatic storytelling.

Fredrik Pacius used Topelius's story for his fairy-tale singspiel Prinsessan av Cypern (Helsinki, 28 November 1860).

== Performance history ==
Prinsessan av Cypern was premiered at the Royal Swedish Opera in Stockholm on 29 April 1937 with Hjördis Schymberg and Set Svanholm in leading roles, and the orchestra and chorus conducted by Herbert Sandberg, costumes by Jon-And and choreography by Julian Algo. This production was given a single performance in Göteborg on 11 May 1937, and closed in Stockholm later in the year. Kurt Atterberg criticized the programming of a new work so late in the season.

Malmö Opera mounted four performances of a semi-staged production premiered on 23 August 2008. The production was broadcast on Swedish Radio on 25 October 2008. The conductor Joakim Unander devised a short orchestral suite Tre Bilder (Three pictures) for a concert broadcast during the composer's centenary.

== Synopsis ==
=== Act 1 ===
Aphrodite's grove at the Cyprus coast
The proud princess Chryseis attracts the attention of the adventurer Lemminkäinen, who has just come to Cyprus with his brother in arms Tiera. When Lemminkäinen makes overtures towards Chryseis the nobleman Medon seeks to imprison him. King Chysandros shows mercy to Lemminkäinen, but warns Chryseis about Lemminkäinen's arrogance. During a feast, Lemminkäinen abducts Chryseis while Tiera takes one of the bridesmaids, Anemotis. Medon takes up pursuit and vows to never lose sight of Chryseis.

=== Act 2 ===
Tableau 1: Helka's cabin at Kauko in Finland
Mother Helka awaits the return of Lemminkäinen while his sister Ainikki is waiting for Tiera whom she loves. The friends return, each with a happy bride, who adopt new names in the northern country. Chryseis becomes Kyllikki and Anemotis becomes Tullikki.
Tableau 2: At Lemminkäinen's castle
Medon tracks them down, and after a struggle the princess says she loves Lemminkäinen, who sings ecstatically of transforming the hut into a castle.

=== Act 3 ===
The Castle Lemminkäinen
After the long winter, Lemminkäinen moans to his slave - who finds that his master needs changing. Chryseis comforts Ainikki that life will be easier in the spring. Lemminkäinen and Kyllikki quarrel but are reconciled and promise to love each other: he will not go fighting, so she should not dance. Medon's ship has been frozen in the ice, but he now prepares his return journey south. He and Anemotis join and plan to persuade Chryseis come back with them on the ship. Tiera and a slave call Lemminkäinen to battle in a neighboring village, and when he learns that Kyllikki has gone to the ship, breaking her promises he throws himself into the fighting after giving Helka his magical hair brush, which will bleed the day he dies.

=== Act 4 ===
Tableau 1: A bay in Pohja, in the far north
Medon's ship has drifted on a foggy and desolate coastline; Chryseis bemoans her fate. Medon follows her and gets Anemotis to keep watch. Lemminkäinen emerges from the mist complaining that he had been betrayed, Chryseis accuses him of betraying her.
Tableau 2: In the mountains
The slave has discovered an old shepherd who wants revenge on Lemminkäinen, and with the help of the treacherous slave he kills Lemminkäinen, but then falls victim to a blow from the slave.
Tiera and Helka and the bleeding brush come to search for Lemminkäinen, and kills the slave. Tiera evokes an underworld god who says that Lemminkäinen may only be saved from death by true love.
Tableau 3: In the realm of Tuonela
Helka descends to hell and releases her son with a song.
Tableau 4: In the mountains
Medon and Anemotis find Chryseis and return to Cyprus and the grove of Aphrodite.
