= Arabella =

1933 opera by Richard Strauss

- Opera by Richard Strauss
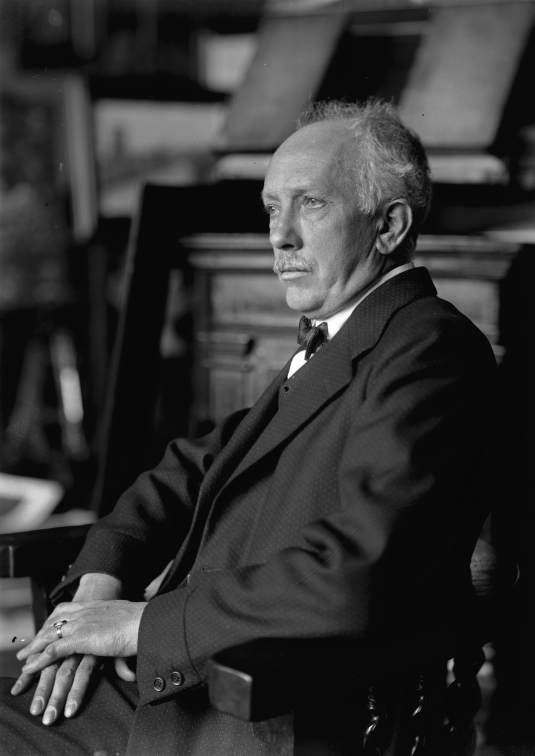
- Strauss in 1922, by Ferdinand Schmutzer
- Librettist: Hugo von Hofmannsthal
- Language: German
- Premiere: 1 July 1933; Sächsisches Staatstheater, Dresden

Arabella, Op. 79, is a lyric comedy, or opera, in three acts by Richard Strauss to a German libretto by Hugo von Hofmannsthal, their sixth and last operatic collaboration.

== Performance history ==
It was first performed on 1 July 1933 at the Dresden Sächsisches Staatstheater, shortly followed by its Austrian premiere at Wiener Staatsoper on 21 October 1933. After that performance, Strauss conveyed his gratitude to the principal soprano Lotte Lehmann, who sang despite the death of her mother earlier that day. The opera received its premiere in the UK on 17 May 1934 at London's Royal Opera House. The premiere in the Americas was at the Teatro Colón in Buenos Aires on 16 August 1934, conducted by Fritz Busch, with Margarete Teschemacher in the title role. Two decades later, on 10 February 1955, it was performed at the Metropolitan Opera in New York, sung in English, with Eleanor Steber in the title role. The Met has given numerous performances of the work since that date, sung in German starting in 1983. At the 2008 Helpmann Awards, the production by Opera Australia won the Award for Best Opera.

== Roles ==
Roles, voice types, premiere cast
| Role | Voice type | Premiere cast, 1 July 1933 Conductor: Clemens Krauss |
|---|---|---|
| Arabella | soprano | Viorica Ursuleac |
| Zdenka, her sister | soprano | Margit Bokor |
| Count Waldner, their father, a retired cavalry officer | bass | Friedrich Plaschke |
| Adelaide, their mother | mezzo-soprano | Camilla Kallab |
| Mandryka, a Croatian landowner | baritone | Alfred Jerger |
| Matteo, a young officer | tenor | Martin Kremer |
| Count Elemer, one of Arabella's suitors | tenor | Karl Albrecht Streib |
| Count Dominik, another | baritone | Kurt Böhme |
| Count Lamoral, a third | bass | Arno Schellenberg |
| The Fiakermilli, belle of the Coachmen's Ball | coloratura soprano | Ellice Illiard |
| A fortune-teller | soprano | Jessyka Koettrik |
| Welko, Djura, Jankel, Mandryka's servants | spoken | Robert Büssel, Robert Schmalnauer, Horst Falke |
| Hotel Porter | spoken | Ludwig Eybisch |
| A chaperone, three card players, a doctor, a waiter | silent | |
Coachmen, waiters, ball guests, hotel residents

== Synopsis ==
Time: 1860s
Place: Vienna

=== Act 1 ===
In a hotel in Vienna

As the curtain opens, Countess Adelaide is having her fortune told. The fortune teller predicts Arabella will marry a man from far away, but that trouble may be in store. The Waldners have a second daughter, Zdenka, but since they cannot afford two daughters marrying, they have indulged her tomboyishness by pretending she is a boy, whom they present as "Zdenko." Zdenka secretly loves Matteo, a penniless officer who loves Arabella. To prevent him from committing suicide, Zdenka writes him love letters she signs with Arabella's name. Zdenka reproaches Arabella for her unsympathetic treatment of Matteo, but Arabella says that she is hoping for the "Right Man," to whom she can give her heart completely. Meanwhile, Arabella is wooed by three suitors, Elemer, Dominik and Lamoral, and acknowledges that she may have to accept one of them, but has fallen in love at first sight with a stranger she passed in the street.

Count Waldner, in dire straits, has written to all his friends for financial help, to no avail. He was hopeful for an answer from an old and immensely wealthy Croatian friend of his, Mandryka, even sending him a portrait of Arabella in hopes of a marriage. A visitor announced as Mandryka arrives and Waldner is surprised to see that it is not his friend. The man explains he is Mandryka's nephew, also named Mandryka. His uncle is dead, and as his only heir, he has acquired his fortune; he also received the letter and portrait. From seeing the portrait, he has fallen in love with Arabella. He offers to marry her and gives Waldner money.

A carnival ball is to be held that night. Matteo asks "Zdenko," his supposedly male friend, when he will receive another letter from Arabella; "Zdenko" answers that he will have one that very evening at the ball. Arabella continues to muse about the strange man she noticed, but when Count Elemer arrives to be her escort for the evening, she tries to banish these thoughts and look forward to the excitement of the Fasching.

=== Act 2 ===
In a ballroom [The Coachman's Ball]

Arabella meets Mandryka, who turns out to be her fascinating stranger. Mandryka tells her about his life and his country's customs, in which young women offer their fiancés a glass of water as a token of agreeing to be married. Mandryka tells Arabella that she will be mistress of all the things he owns, and that she will be the only thing ranked above him besides the Emperor himself; Arabella happily agrees to marry him, saying, "I give myself to you, for eternity." Then Mandryka agrees to Arabella's request that she be allowed to stay for another hour to say farewell to her girlhood, during which she thanks her suitors for their interest in her and bids them goodbye.

Meanwhile, Zdenka gives Matteo a letter with the key to the room next to Arabella's, saying that it is Arabella's room and promising that Arabella will meet him there that night. Mandryka overhears this conversation and, mad with jealousy and disappointment (after first trying to evade these feelings), raises a commotion, flirting with the Fiakermilli, the ball's mascot. Since Arabella is nowhere to be found, the Waldners insist that he meet Arabella to talk things out, and they head for the hotel.

=== Act 3 ===
A lobby in the hotel

A passionate orchestral prelude depicts the lovemaking of Matteo and Zdenka.

Arabella enters the lobby and comes across Matteo. As Matteo is in love with Arabella and thinks it is she with whom he has just made love in a darkened room, their conversation is at once confused and emotional. The Count, the Countess, and Mandryka arrive and further the misunderstanding. After Mandryka accuses Arabella of infidelity and plans to go back to his land, Zdenka rushes in, no longer in disguise and in her negligee (making it clear that it was she who had the encounter with Matteo). She declares her intention to drown herself in disgrace. The situation is finally cleared up. Matteo learns that the letters were forged by Zdenka and that it was she and not Arabella in the room. He suddenly realizes he is in love with Zdenka, whom he agrees to marry. Mandryka begs forgiveness, and Arabella tells him they will think no more of the night's events. Arabella asks his servant to bring her a glass of water, and Mandryka thinks she has requested it for her refreshment. Arabella goes upstairs and Mandryka, ruminating on his indecorous behavior and blaming himself, stays downstairs. Arabella comes down the stairs and, seeing that he has stayed and having forgiven him, offers him the glass of water, signifying reconciliation and marriage. They happily kiss and Arabella goes up the stairs to her room.

== Instrumentation ==
- Woodwinds: 2 flutes, piccolo, 2 oboes, English horn, 3 clarinets (1st and 2nd play clarinets in B-flat and A, the third part is for clarinet in C), bass clarinet (part in B-flat and A), 3 bassoons, contrabassoon
- Brass: 4 horns, 3 trumpets, 3 trombones, bass tuba
- Other: timpani, snare drum, bass drum, triangle, 1 pair of crash cymbals, suspended cymbal harp, 16 1st violins, 14 2nd violins, 12 violas, 10 cellos, 8 double basses
