= Gertrud Pålson-Wettergren =

Swedish singer

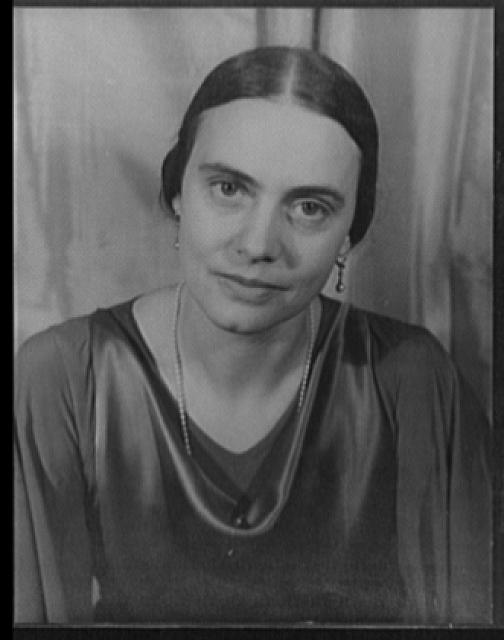
Gertrud Pålson-Wettergren in 1935

Gertrud Pålson-Wettergren (17 February 1897 – 26 November 1991) was a Swedish mezzo-soprano.

She was hired at Royal Swedish Opera between 1922 and 1948. On 20 December 1935 she made her debut at the Metropolitan as Amneris in Aida opposite Elisabeth Rethberg, Giovanni Martinelli, John Charles Thomas and Ezio Pinza. Her roles there included Brangäne in Tristan und Isolde, Venus in Tannhäuser, Carmen which she sang in Swedish replacing Rosa Ponselle in a performance, and opened the 1936/37 season with Samson et Dalila. Her last performance there was on 29 January 1938, making a total of 29 performances.

Although she sang at Covent Garden in 1936 and 1939 in Aida and Il trovatore, the war prevented a further international career. She returned to London in 1947, singing in Die Walküre at the BBC under Sir Thomas Beecham.

In 1945 she sang Nyx in the premiere of Rosenberg's opera Lycksalighetens ö in Stockholm.

She was awarded the Latvian Order of the Three Stars 5th Class on 16 May 1935.
