= Preiser Records =

Austrian record label

Preiser Records is an independent Austrian record label. It was founded in 1952 by Otto G. Preiser (1920–1996).

The label is particularly important for recordings from the Viennese cabaret scene, especially from the 1950s and 1960s (Helmut Qualtinger, Georg Kreisler, Gerhard Bronner), and for the re-release of historical vocal recordings in the series Lebendige Vergangenheit, which has been in existence since 1966. Responsible for these two areas was Jürgen E. Schmidt (1937-2010), production and recording manager of Preiser-Records.

In 2007, the company had a market share of one percent of the IFPI Austria – Verband der Österreichischen Musikwirtschaft and releases today mainly on CDs.

The company has an analogue sound studio in Casino Baumgarten at its disposal.
