= Sigurd Björling =

Swedish operatic baritone

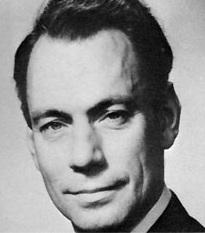
Sigurd Björling

Sigurd Björling (2 November 1907 - 8 April 1983) was a Swedish operatic baritone.

He made his debut as Alfio in Cavalleria Rusticana in 1935 at Royal Swedish Opera. He specialized in Wagnerian roles, among them Wotan, Telramund, Amfortas, Hans Sachs and Kurwenal. His United States debut came on 3 October 1950 in San Francisco (as Kurwenal), and the following year he was the first postwar-Wotan at the Bayreuth Festival. On 15 November 1952 he made his debut at the Metropolitan Opera, singing there for a full season. He sang his last performance in 1974. He appeared in the 1979 film Kejsaren.
