= Opera in the United States =

Description of opera's historical development in the USA

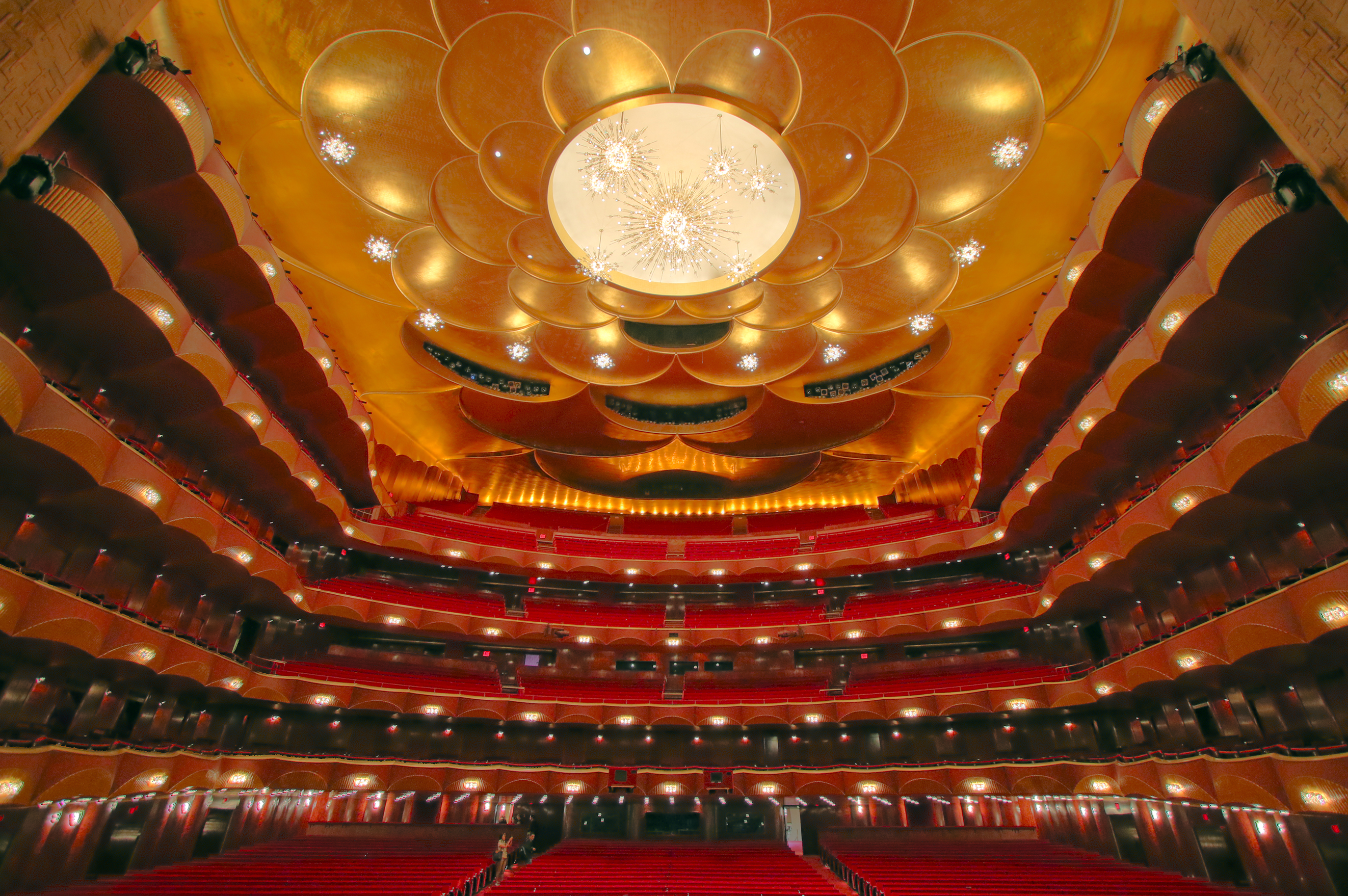
Metropolitan Opera, 2016

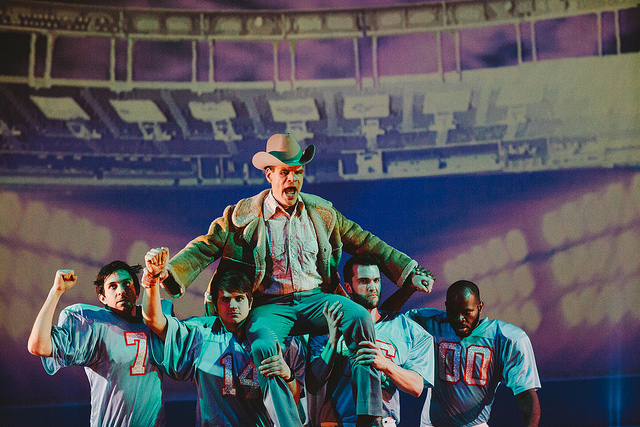
Bum Phillips, 2014

Opera in the United States dates back to the 18th century and developed from an imported European luxury into a vibrant, distinctly American art form. In the 19th and 20th centuries, tours, first by European artists and later by the Met, also brought opera to remote regions. Since 1931, regular radio broadcasts, and since 1949, televised operas, have contributed to the genre's popularity. Today, opera in the United States balances grand traditional productions with groundbreaking contemporary works.

Four opera companies – the Metropolitan Opera in New York City, the San Francisco Opera, the Lyric Opera of Chicago, and the Houston Grand Opera — have achieved international recognition, also the opera composers Joplin, Gershwin, Barber, Menotti, Bernstein, Floyd, Glass, Adams, Heggie and Mazzoli. Many new operas tackle contemporary social themes, historical events, or American literature – like Treemonisha, Porgy and Bess, Susannah, Einstein on the Beach, and Dead Man Walking. Musically, they frequently blend classical traditions with American idioms such as jazz, blues, musical theatre, and minimalism. The most famous US American singer was Maria Callas.

Unlike European opera, which traditionally relied on state funding, US opera relies heavily on private philanthropy and ticket sales.

== 18th century ==
=== Colonial era ===
″Markets and warehouses, taverns and tobacco sheds, the local courthouse — these were the first homes of opera in North Amerika″, writes historian John Dizikes. He goes on underlining, that, unlike Europe, these venues had ″nothing to do with the splendor of the state, everything to do with day-to-day-commerce.″

The first opera known to have been performed in the American colonies was the ballad opera Flora, which was performed in Charleston, South Carolina on February 8, 1735. Later in the century, The Beggar's Opera was performed in New York City in 1750. This continued the trend of the popularity of ballad operas.

=== The Disappointment ===
In 1767, a first example of an American ballad opera was announced in Philadelphia – The Disappointment or The Force of Credulity, written under the pseudonym Andrew Barton. It was heavily advertised and fully scheduled to premiere at Philadelphia's Southwark Theatre on April 20, 1767. However, just four days before opening night, the performance was abruptly cancelled. A notice in The Pennsylvania Gazette on April 22, 1767, explained that the play contained too many "personal reflections" that made it "unfit for the stage." In plain terms, it was a biting satire of local Philadelphia figures who were digging for buried pirate treasure, and those influential locals likely used their power to shut the production down before the curtain could rise.

The opera was reconstructed by Samuel Adler, it premiered in 1976 at the Eastman School of Music in Rochester, New York during the United States Bicentennial.

=== New Orleans ===
Opera in New Orleans began prior to the Louisiana Purchase, with the first recorded opera being a performance of André Grétry's Sylvain in May 1796. In January 1808, the Théâtre St. Philippe was opened with the U.S. Premiere of Une folie by French composer Étienne Méhul. The U.S. premiere of Cherubini's Les deux journées took place there in March 1811. The most famous opera venue in town between 1819 and 1859 was the Théâtre d'Orléans. Due to the sweltering summer months, the impresario John Davis took the opera company on the road to northeastern cities like Boston, New York and Philadelphia, starting in the late 1820s.

The Théâtre d'Orléans was succeeded by the French Opera House, located on Bourbon Street in the French Quarter. This theatre burned down in 1919, causing severe disruption to opera in the city. Five persons, asleep over the Café de l'Opéra, barely escaped the fire, all scenery, costumes, and music were destroyed.

== 19th century ==
=== Lorenzo Da Ponte ===
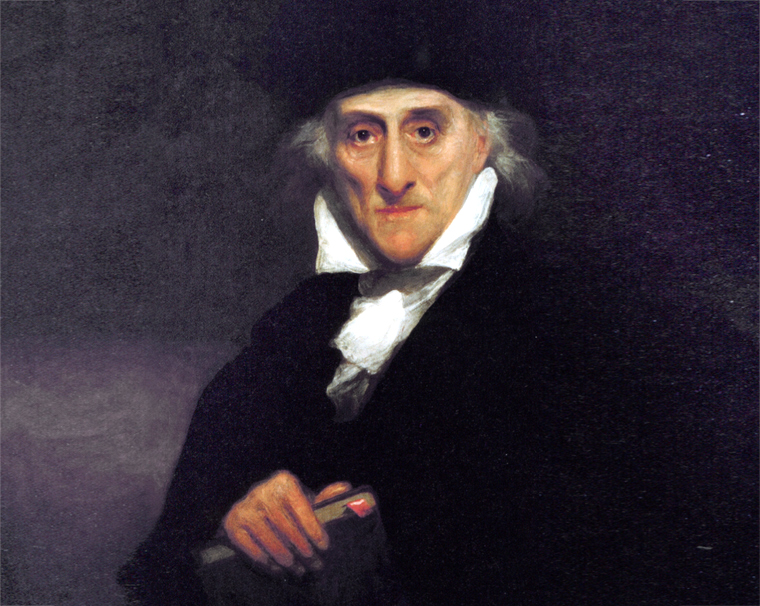
Lorenzo Da Ponte at the New York Yacht Club, 1830. Portrait by Samuel Morse

The 18th century laid the foundation for the operatic tradition that would thrive in the United States in the subsequent centuries. Despite initial challenges and a limited scope, the interest in opera endured, paving the way for the expansion and diversification of the art form in the 19th century. Having had financial troubles in Europe, librettist Lorenzo Da Ponte came to the US in 1805. He settled in New York City first, then Sunbury, Pennsylvania, where he briefly ran a grocery store and gave private Italian lessons. He returned to New York to open a bookstore. He became friends with Clement Clarke Moore, and was named the first professor of Italian literature at Columbia College, an unpaid appointment. He viewed himself as an ambassador of European culture in a barbarous country. He persuaded the Spanish tenor Manuel García to bring his opera troupe to New York, where they performed at the Park Theatre at Park Row in lower Manhattan.

They presented a range of Italian operas, most of them by Gioachino Rossini. Opening night on December 4, 1825, was to The Barber of Seville. On May 23, 1826, the Manuel Garcia troupe also performed Don Giovanni. It was the first performance of this opera in America. Manuel Garcia's daughter, Maria Malibran, sung the role of Zerlina. Da Ponte was present.

Already before its first Italian season, the Park Theatre, established in 1798, had presented ballad operas like The Beggars Opera or Pasticcios. In 1812, the Yankee Chronology by William Dunlap was performed, a musical interlude in one act. In 1819, English tenor Thomas Phillips scored a big success with an English version of The Barber of Seville. In 1824, an mutilated version of The Marriage of Figaro was shown, followed by Weber's Der Freischütz in March of 1825, again a stunning success. In 1848, the Park Theatre burned down.

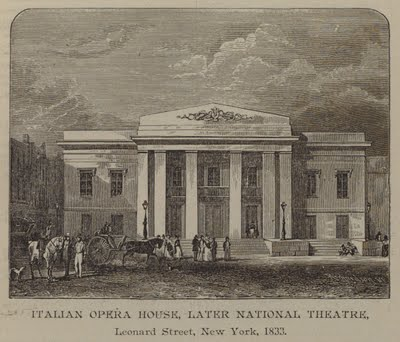
The Italian Opera House

In 1833, at the age of eighty-four, Da Ponte founded the first purpose-built opera theater in the United States, the Italian Opera House. It was located on the northwest corner of Leonard and Church Streets in Manhattan and it was far superior to any theater the city had yet seen. It was a lavish, European-style building with frescoed ceilings and private boxes. But it lasted only for two seasons before the company went bankrupt. Shortly after the death of Da Ponte, his opera house burned down to the ground. It was, however, the predecessor of the New York Academy of Music and of the Metropolitan Opera.

=== Opera houses in New York City ===
- 1844 Palmo's Opera House
- 1847 Astor Opera House

=== European tours and emergence of American companies ===
During the 1800s, European opera companies embarked on tours across prominent cities in the United States, introducing timeless masterpieces to American spectators. Memorable shows played a significant role in the increasing appeal of opera. In several cities an Academy of Music was established — for example in Boston (1853), in New York City (1854), in Philadelphia (1857), in Brooklyn (1861) and in Atlantic City (1892); these were purely performance venues, not training institutions. The emergence of these opera companies marked a transition towards establishing a domestically nurtured operatic heritage. Opera in the 19th century became a cultural cornerstone, influencing literature, art, and societal norms. It played a role in shaping the cultural identity of growing cities, with the Metropolitan Opera, founded in 1883, emerging as a major institution. Opera went where there was money (and preferably already a train station), so in 1878 even Central City, Colorado became the proud owner of an Opera House

=== Academy of Music in Manhattan ===
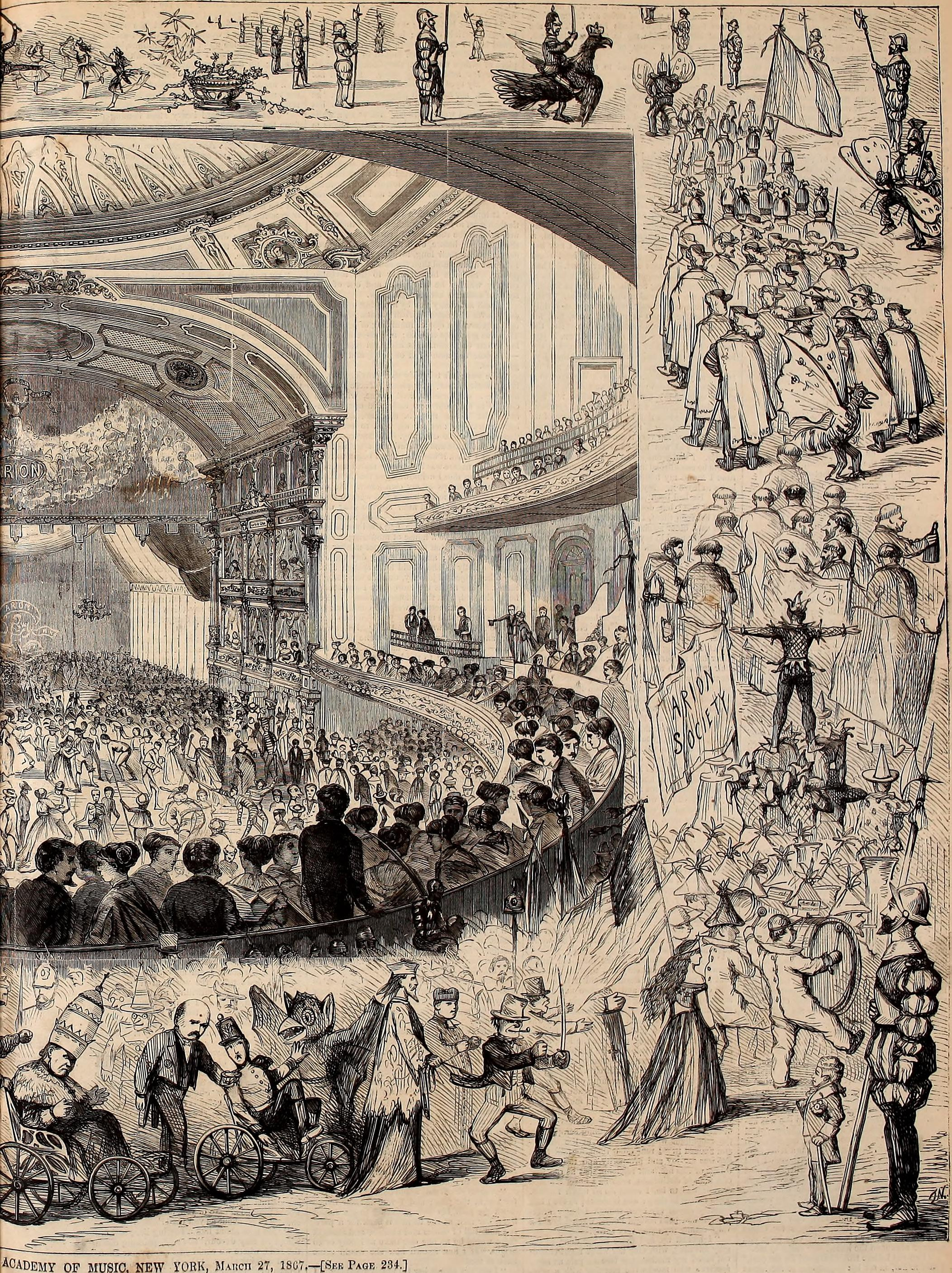
The Academy of Music in Harper's Weekly, 1867

During the demise of the Astor Opera House, New York's elite started to build a new opera house in what was then the more genteel neighborhood of Union Square. Its name was Academy of Music and it was located on 14th Street between Third Avenue and Irving Place. Moses H. Grinnell instigated the project and formed a corporation in 1852 to fund the construction. Shares were sold at $1,000 each to raise $200,000. The building was designed by Alexander Saeltzer, a German-American architect, and, at the time, it was the world's largest opera venue. It seated over 4,600, but had limited accommodation in boxes for the gentry. There were only 18 boxes. The Academy of Music opened in 1854 and was the first enduring dedicated opera house in the United States, undisputed and unrivaled for nearly thirty years. A review in The New York Times praised the building to be an acoustical ″triumph″, but ″In every other aspect ... a decided failure,″ complaining about the interior design and the closeness of the seating. The opening night was dedicated to Bellinis Norma, starring Giulia Grisi and Giuseppe Mario. Further female stars of the Academy of Music were Hungarian Etelka Gerster, Swedish Christina Nilsson, American Minnie Hauk and Adelina Patti.

=== Adelina Patti ===
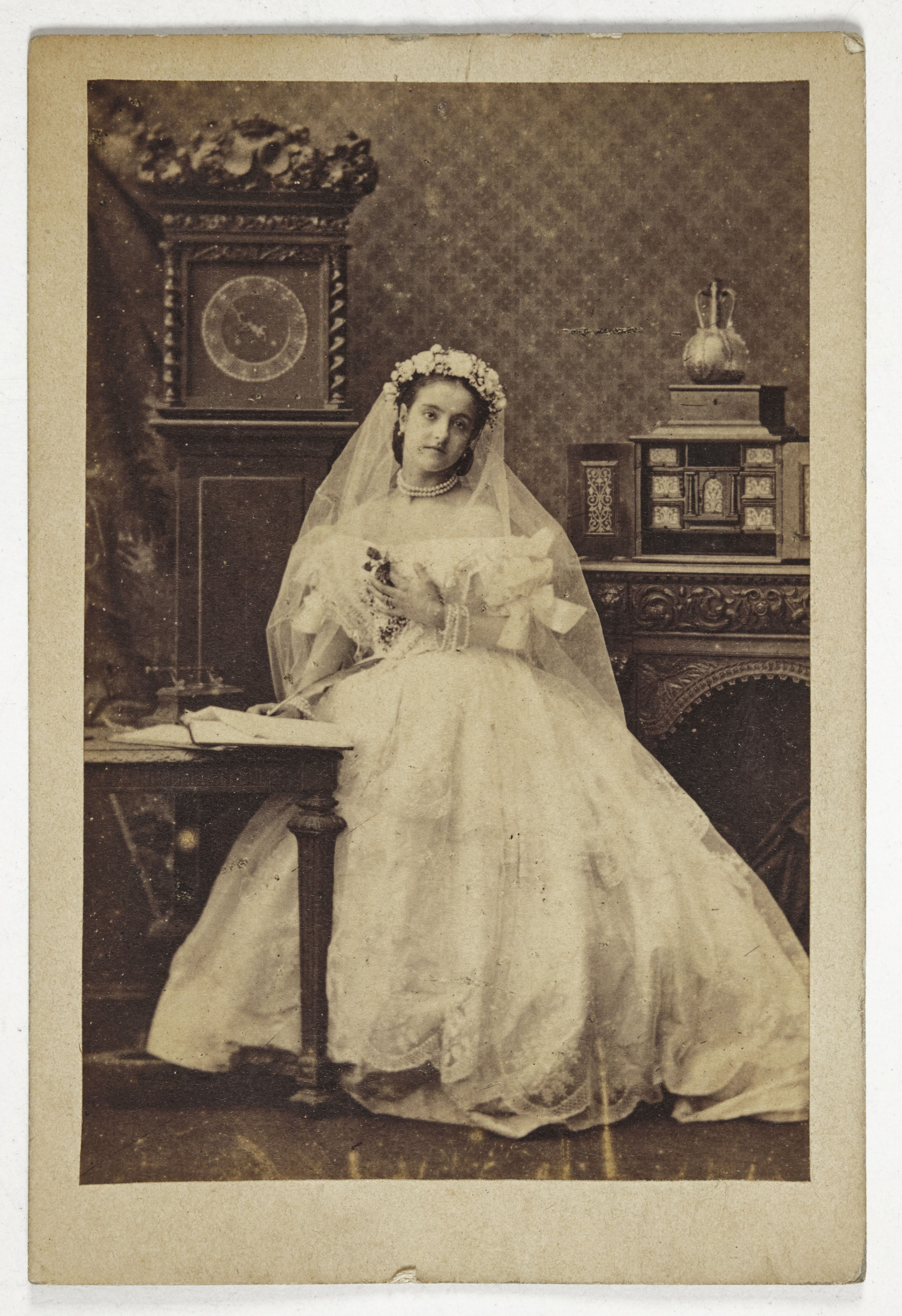
Lucia di Lamermoor

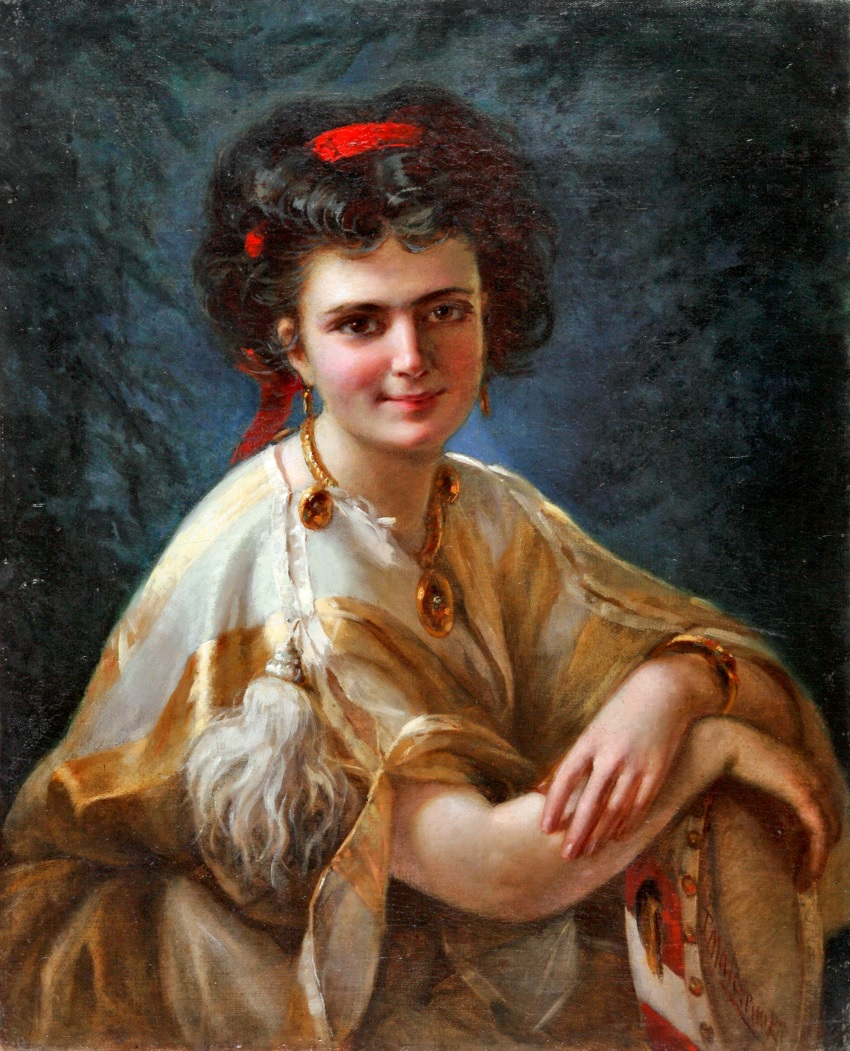
Esmeralda

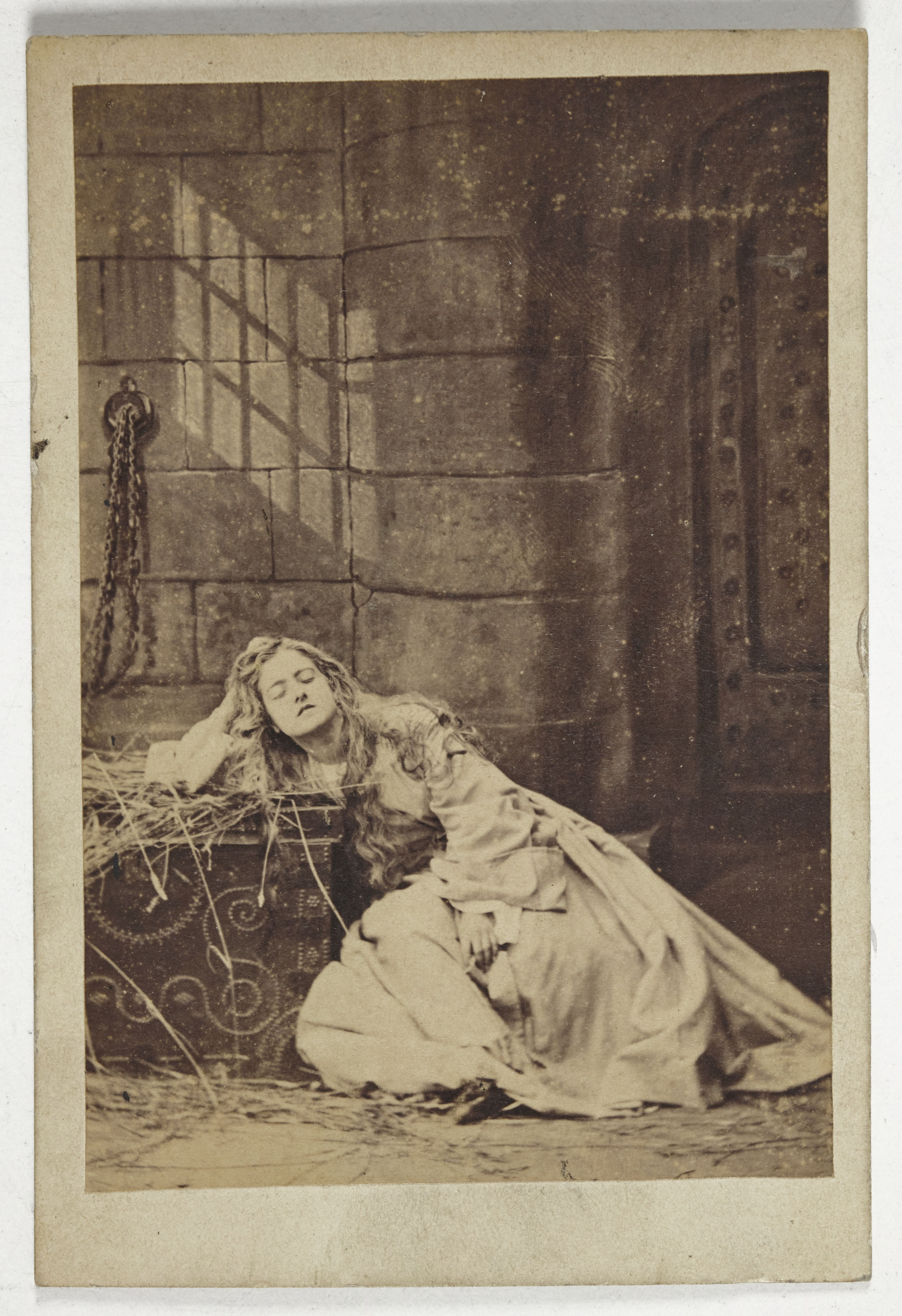
Faust

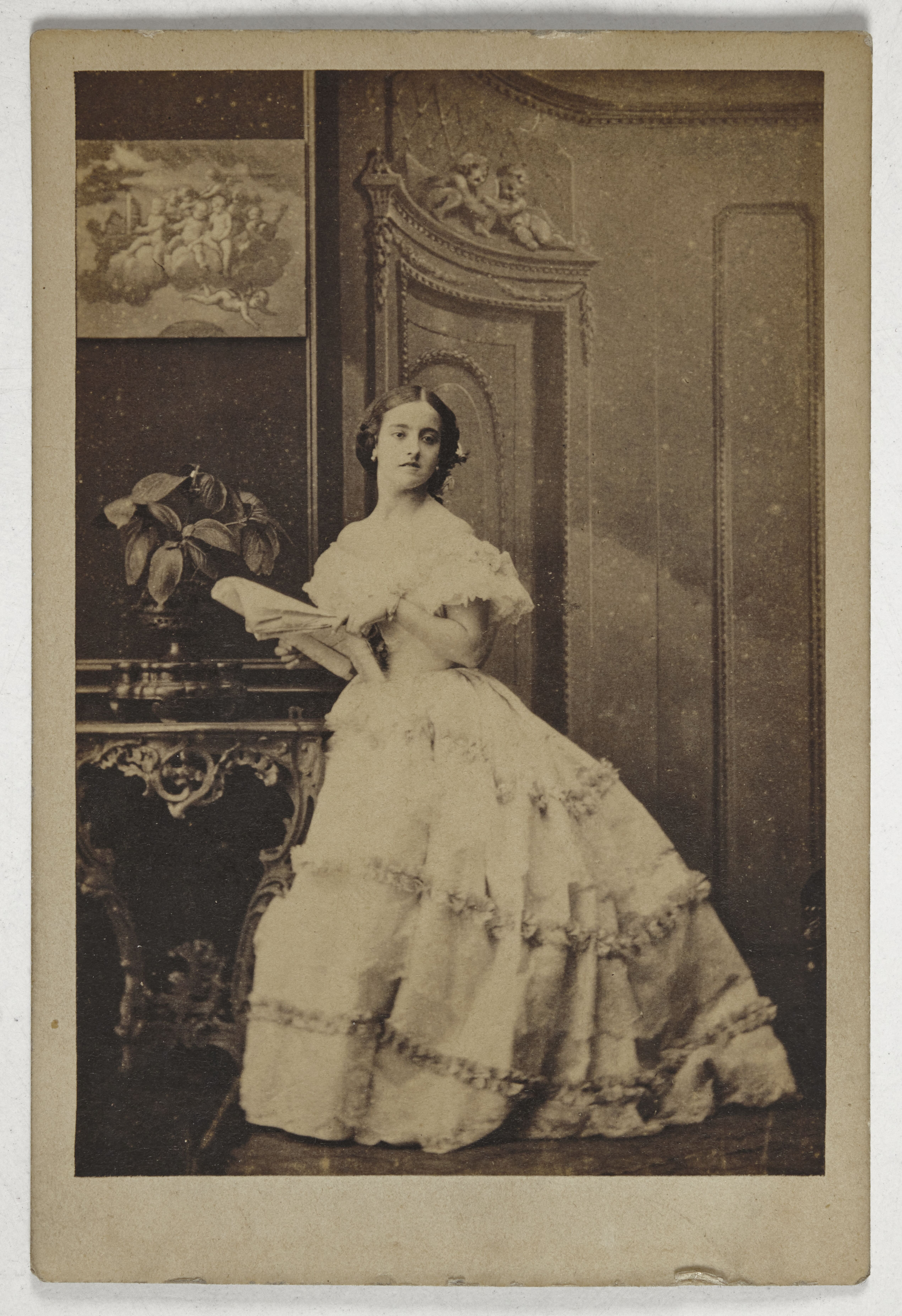
Don Pasquale

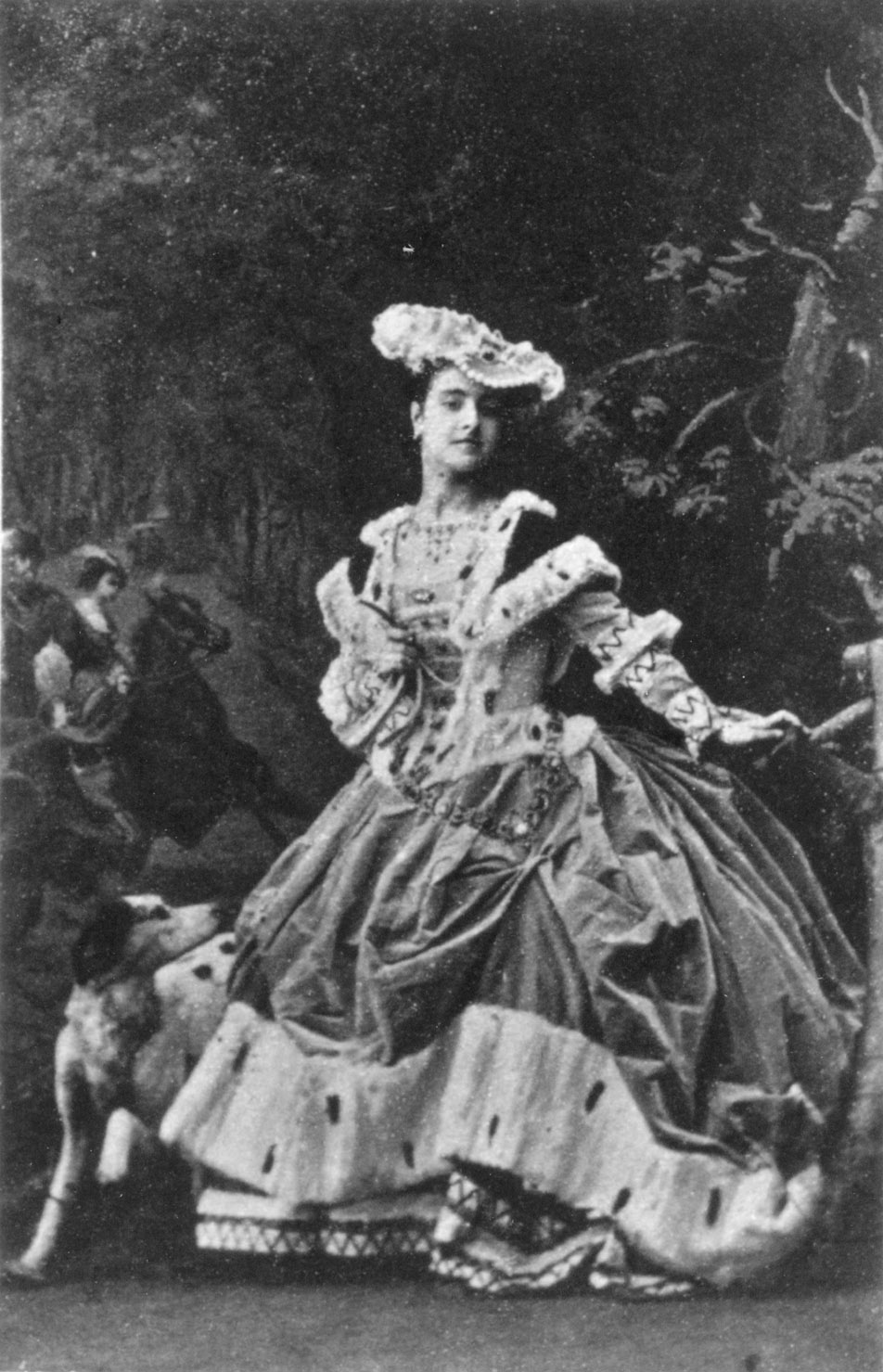
Martha

The absolute star of the Academy of Music in the later years was Adelina Patti (1843-1919), a soprano of Italian descent. She debuted there at just 16 years in the title role of Lucia di Lammermoor. In the 1870s and 1880s, Patti was the highest-paid classical musician worldwide. She received up to $ 5.000 in Gold per night − payable to her manager before she would enter the stage. She was exempt from attending rehearsals, could decide her own roles and the schedule of the performances. Her most famous roles — apart of Donizetti's Lucia — were Amina and Elvira in Bellini operas, Rosina and Semiramide in Rossini operas, Marguerite and Juliette in Gounod operas, Dinorah in Meyerbeer's Le Pardon de Ploërmel as well as the Verdi roles Violetta, Gilda and Leonora (Il trovatore).

=== Opera war in New York City ===
In the 1880s, a controversy arose between the old elite and the nouveau riche of Manhattan. To publicly affirm their status, they demanded a box at the Academy of Music. After Maria Louisa Kassam, since 1841 married with William H. Vanderbilt, heiress to an immense fortune, was denied a box, the immediate need for a new opera house—with enough boxes for the new elite—became apparent. In 1883, the Metropolitan Opera House in the 39th Street was completed.

=== Wagner's immediate recognition ===
Although German composer Richard Wagner was an outspoken anti-Semite, which was also well known by then, his work quickly gained popularity in the US at the end of the 1880s, especially in cities with substantial immigration from Germany (Boston, Philadelphia, Cincinnati, Chicago, San Francisco, Milwaukee). Orchestral excerpts were performed in American concerts by the late 1850s, helping seed interest before full operas appeared. American conductors and impresarios – most notably Theodore Thomas – championed Wagner in concert, normalizing long symphonic excerpts and preludes. The Metropolitan Opera (opened in 1883) quickly became a Wagner stronghold, thanks to Leopold Damrosch, Anton Seidl and Walter Damrosch. Its early seasons featured Lohengrin and Tannhäuser, and by the 1890s the Met was presenting Die Meistersinger von Nürnberg, Tristan und Isolde, and the four Ring operas (beginning piecemeal, then in cycles), mainly in German with prominent European guest singers.

=== Conductors from abroad ===
While most European singers only came to the US for a few months and then returned, several conductors stayed longer in the country and set the standards at the Met.

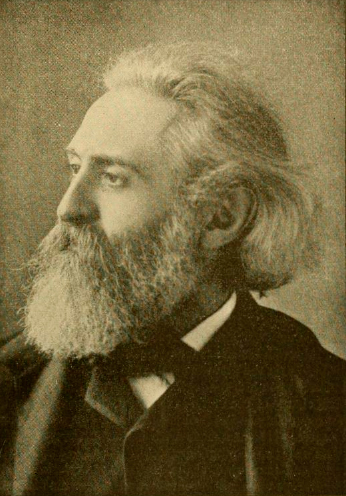
Leopold Damrosch

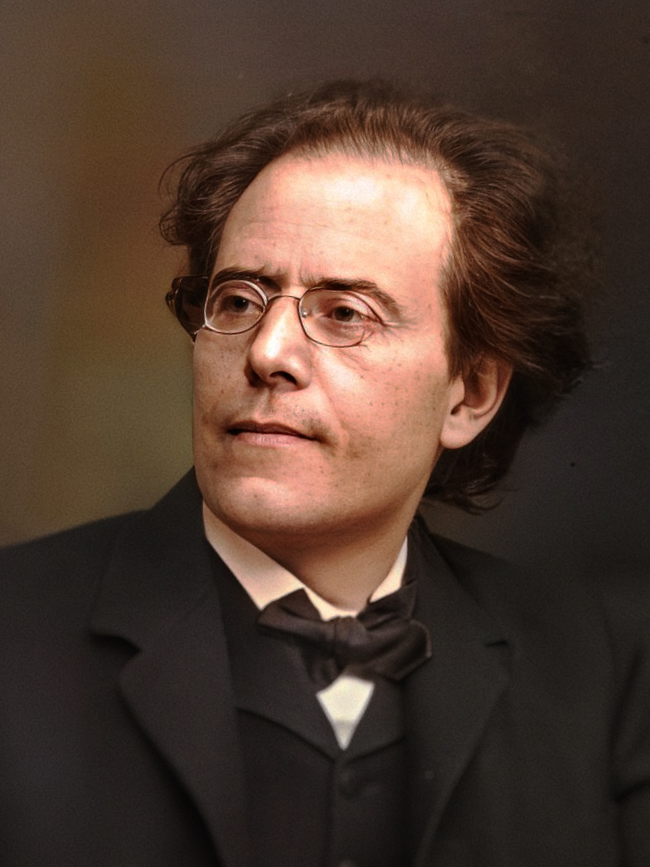
Gustav Mahler

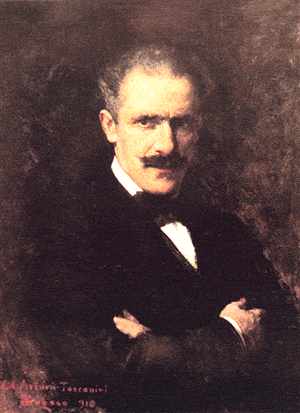
Arturo Toscanini

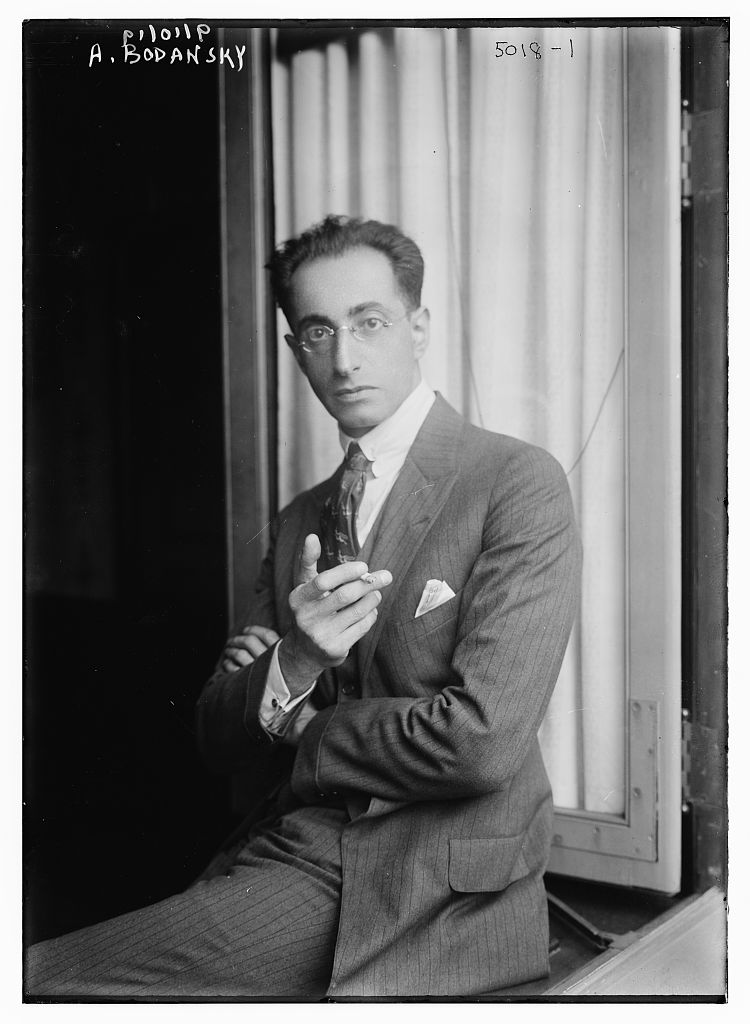
Artur Bodanzky

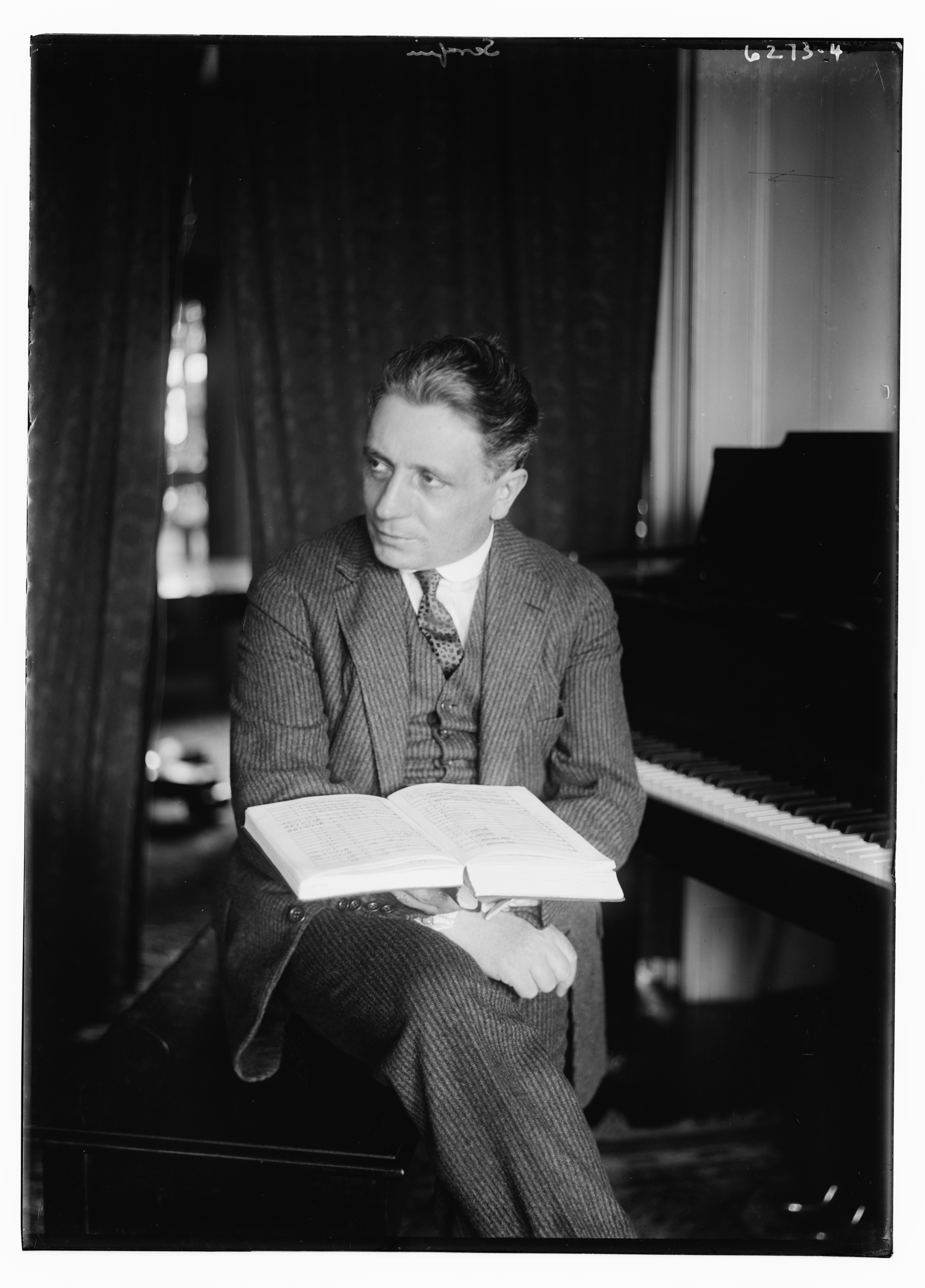
Tullio Serafin

Leopold Damrosch and his family immigrated in 1871 from Germany—at the invitation of the Arion Society of New York. The highlight of his career was the 1884/85 season at the Met with a German program, among them several operas by Richard Wagner, which saved the fate of the institution after its first season of Italian operas had caused heavy losses. His sons Frank and Walter both succeeded him as conductors of the Oratorio Society of New York, founded by their father. His daughter, Clara Mannes, was a music teacher. Between 1902 and 1915, another immigrant from Germany, Alfred Hertz, conducted a total of 768 performances at the Met. Highly paid and highly anticipated, Gustav Mahler made his Met debut on January 1st, 1908 with Tristan und Isolde. The performance was hailed for its transparent orchestral textures and elastic tempos. Mahler stayed for two years and conducted 88 performances at the Met—Mozart, Beethoven, Wagner, Smetana and the U.S. premiere of The Queen of Spades.

Arturo Toscanini, principal conductor at the Met from 1908 til 1915, transformed the institution from a star-vehicle singer's house into a world-class ensemble. Artur Bodanzky headed the Met's German repertoire for nearly a quarter century, from 1915 til 1939, while Tullio Serafin set the standard for the Italian repertoire at the Met from 1924 til 1934.

== 20th century ==
=== Enrico Caruso ===
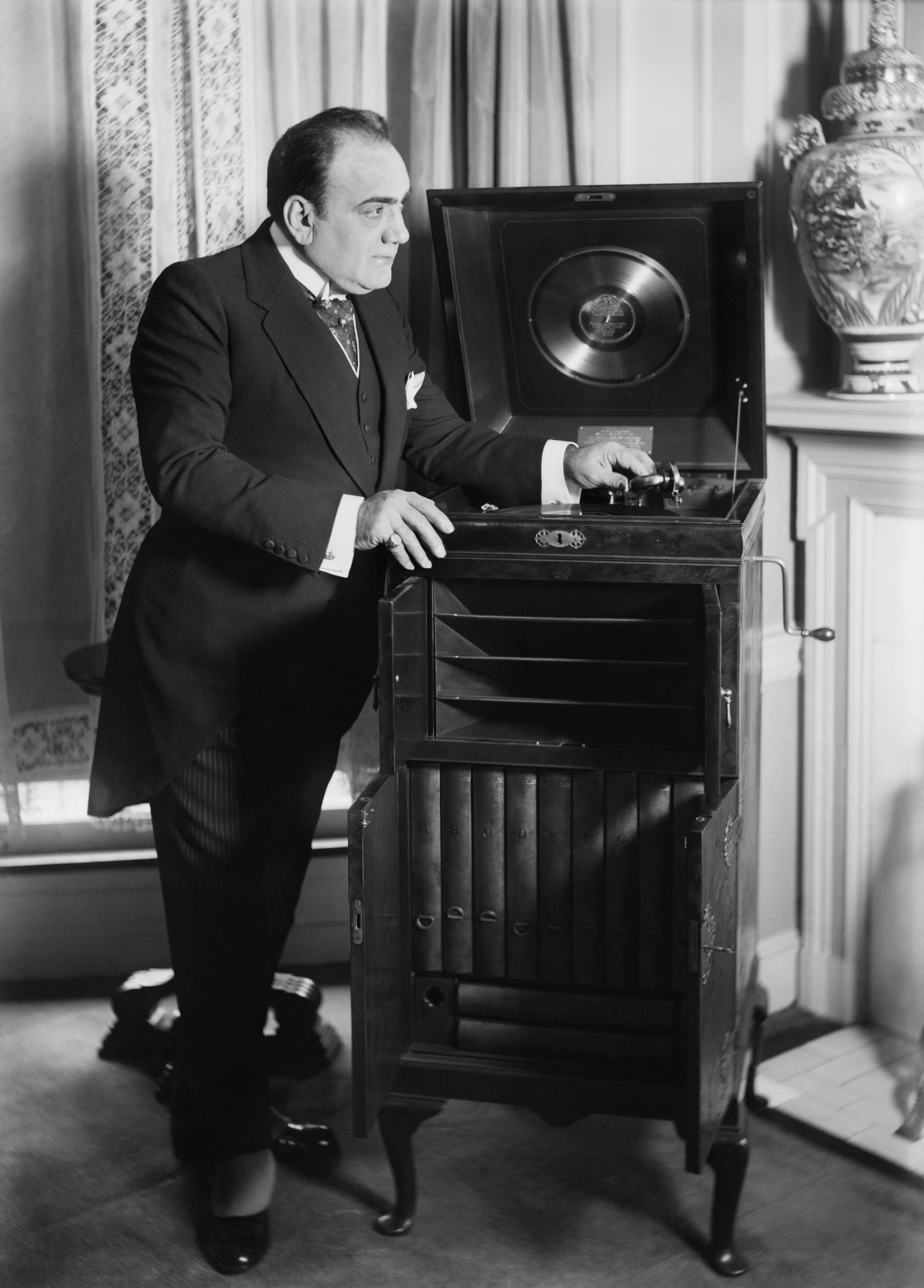
Caruso with a phonograph, 1910s

The first media superstar of opera was definitely Enrico Caruso, the Italian tenor, who first appeared at the Met on November 23rd, 1903 as Duke of Mantova in Verdi's Rigoletto. Initially a representative of the classical Italian bel canto school, he nevertheless pioneered a new, exemplary vocal style. Due to the dramatic nature of the plot, verismo prioritized total identification with the character being portrayed over beautiful vocal delivery. During his guest appearances, Caruso was showered with honors and standing ovations. He appeared in 863 performances at the Met (up to December 1920) and recorded 498 tracks — not only opera arias but also popular songs, such as "'O sole mio." He toured extensively—e.g. in Boston, Chicago, Philadelphia and San Francisco. His voice became a household staple; he popularized opera and classical singing almost single-handedly. Although he passed away before the advent of radio, the early years of the new medium were defined by his recordings. His voice became a household name; he almost single-handedly popularized opera and classical singing. Major roles included Radames and Manrico in the Verdi operas Aida and Il trovatore, Don José in Bizet's Carmen, Cavaradossi in Puccini's Tosca, and Canio in Leoncavallo's Pagliacci. His friends included Puccini and Tosti; both composed for him.

=== Marginalizing black and female composers ===
While operas by Verdi, Wagner, and Puccini secured great successes, local composers had little chance of being staged. African-American and female composers, especially, had a hard time obtaining recognition. Edmond Dédé (1827–1901) was a native of New Orleans. He fled to France and wrote the opera Morgaine in 1887; it was not performed until 2025, and then only in concert version. Neither Scott Joplin (1868–1917) nor his widow succeeded in staging Treemonisha (1911) during their lifetimes. In another case, a composer has disappeared entirely from public view: Harry Lawrence Freeman (1869–1957) supported himself and his own opera company during his lifetime, playing to predominantly black audiences in Harlem. He was acquainted with many African-American artists associated with the Harlem Renaissance. Twenty-one of his operas, as well as many of his other works, survive in Freeman's own manuscripts, and are kept in a collection of his papers at Columbia University. Nevertheless, there are practically no revivals of his operas. Shirley Graham Du Bois (1876–1977) wrote Tom-Tom, an ″Epic of Music and the Negro″. The work was performed successfully in a Cleveland stadium in 1932. Thereafter the work was forgotten for more than 80 years. In 2001, a working score was found at Harvard. A revival is pending.

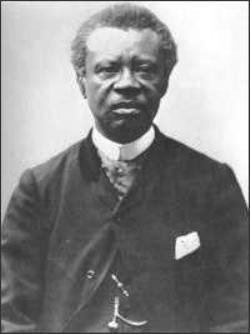
Edmond Dédé

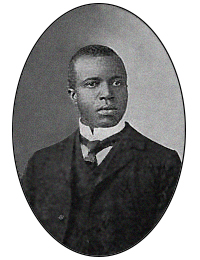
Scott Joplin

Harry Lawrence Freeman

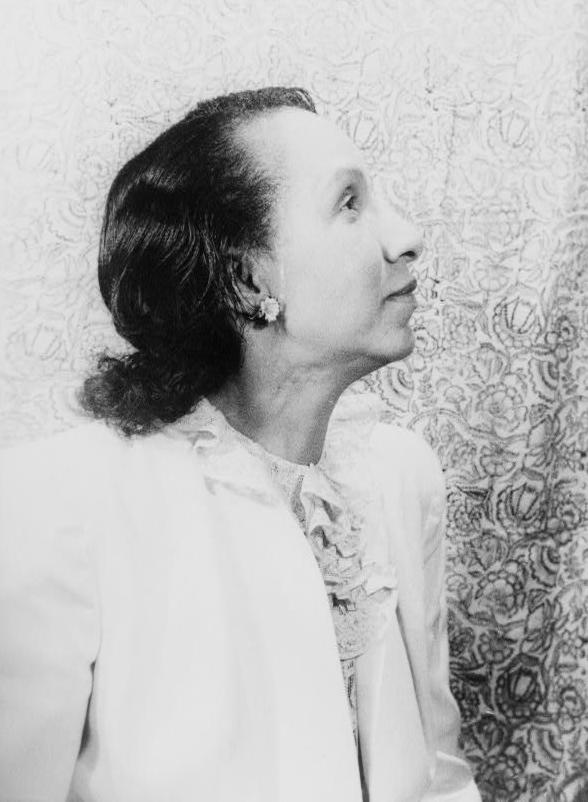
Shirley Graham Du Bois

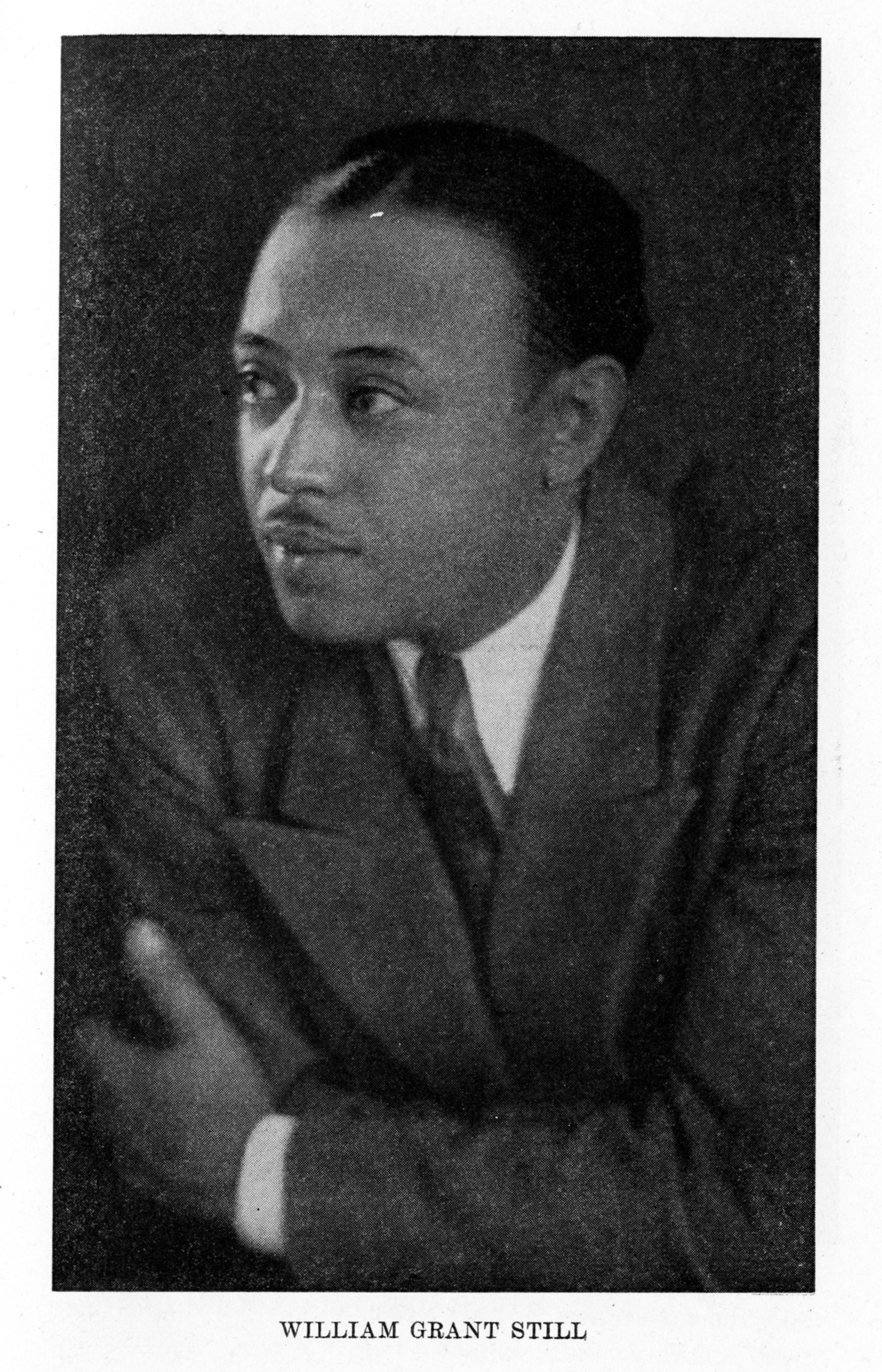
William Grant Still

On March 31, 1949, a decade after its composition, the opera Troubled Island by Langston Hughes (text) and William Grant Still (music) premiered at the New York City Opera. It portrayed Jean-Jacques Dessalines and the Haitian Revolution, a successful insurrection by enslaved Africans in the years 1791 til 1804. It was the first opera by an American to be performed by a major company. However, it received several negative reviews.

The Blues Opera, written in the 1950s, called ″magnificent″ by The New York Times, was never mounted in its full form. The authors were Harold Arlen (1905–1986) and Johnny Mercer (1909–1976), the subject was wealthy Black jockeys in the 1880s. "The lyrics are smart, the music gorgeous."

Throughout the entire 20th century, the Met staged only one opera by a woman, Der Wald by Ethel Smyth, an English composer. The opera Cabildo by Amy Beach (from 1932) wasn't performed until after her death which occurred in 1944. The operas by Margaret Bonds, like the Christmas opera The Ballad of the Brown King, were often relegated to community or church spaces.

Female conductors also faced an uphill battle. The first woman on the podium to establish herself in the U.S. and break through the Met’s glass ceiling was Sarah Caldwell, who founded the Opera Company of Boston in 1957 and made her Met debut in 1976. Following in her footsteps is Marin Alsop, who has been highly influential in integrating opera with contemporary social themes. She became the first female musical director of an American orchestra—the Baltimore Symphony Orchestra (2007-2021)—and spent a large part of her career in Europe and South America, including a stint as chief conductor of the Vienna Radio Symphony Orchestra.

=== Mainstream and radio transmissions ===
Although many American opera companies try hard to incorporate contemporary operas in their repertoire, still most of the most performed operas stem from the big three operatic composers – Mozart, Verdi, Puccini – plus some Italian bel canto composers such as Donizetti and Rossini. The Top 10 of the USA are very similar to European preferences, they contain three operas each by Puccini and Mozart, two by Verdi as well as Carmen by Bizet and The Barber of Seville. The only American operas among the Top 50 in the USA are Porgy and Bess and the Christmas opera Amahl and the Night Visitors by Menotti. Currently there are 125 professional opera companies in the USA − led by the Big Four, the Met, the San Francisco Opera, the Lyric Opera of Chicago and the Houston Grand Opera.

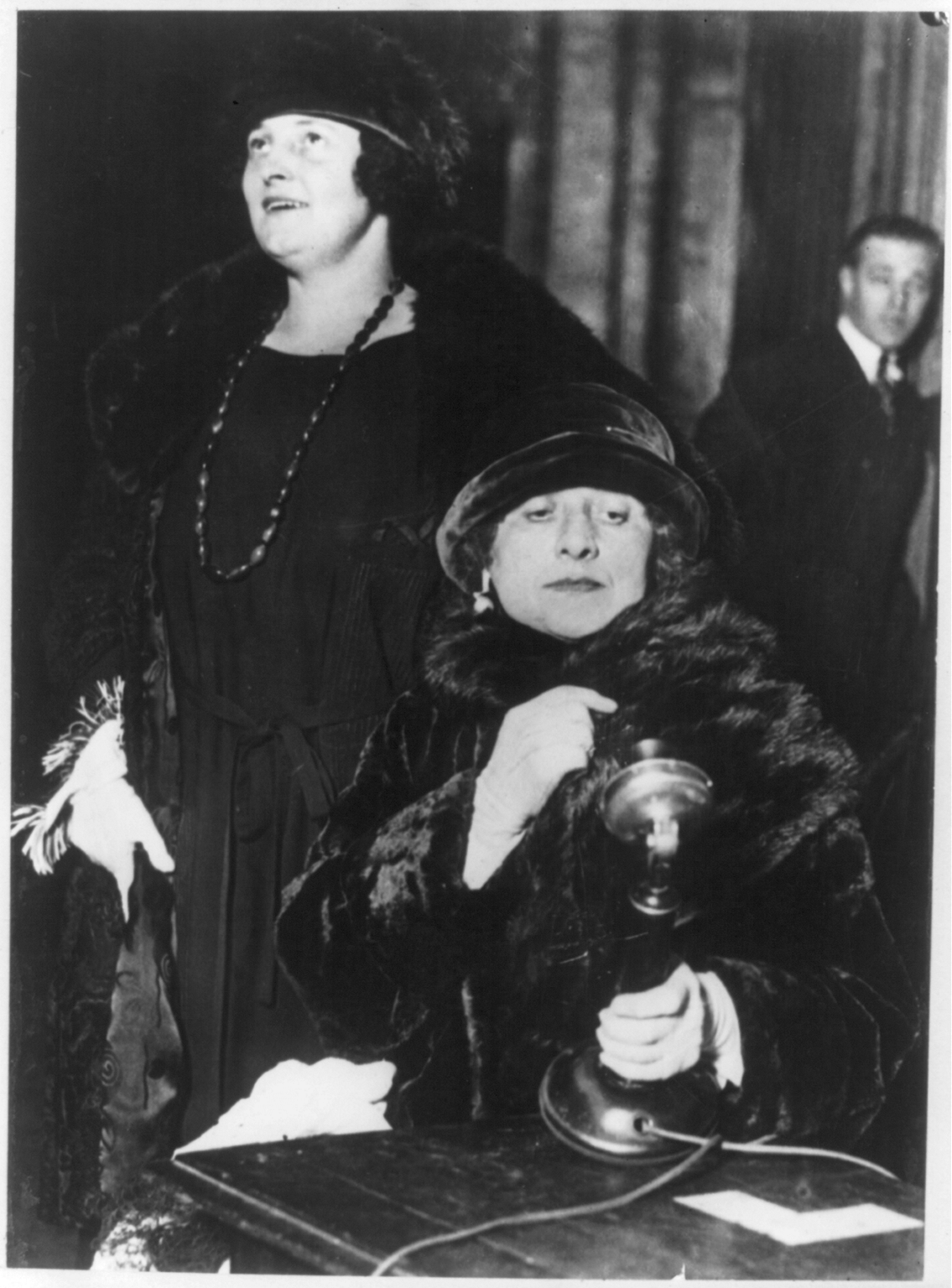
Edith Mason sings into a transmitter, Chicago 1921.

The USA were the pioneer of transmitting opera in radio, TV and cinema. The very first attempt started on January 13, 1910: The radio pioneer Lee de Forest undertook the world's first experiment of a live radio broadcast from an opera stage. He installed microphones in the spotlight of the Met and transmitted parts of Cavalleria rusticana and Pagliacci starring Enrico Caruso and Emmy Destinn. The day before, there was a test with act II and III of Tosca, starring Olive Fremstad in the lead. However, the signal was extremely weak and could only be received by very few people using detector receivers.

It took another more than a decade of technological advancements for opera to become a staple of home radio. In 1921, the Berlin State Opera broadcast a live performance of Madama Butterfly. In 1923, the BBC aired its first live operatic transmission from Covent Garden, featuring the first act of The Magic Flute. On Christmas Day of 1931, the Metropolitan Opera launched its official, permanent Saturday Matinee Broadcast series with Humperdinck's Hänsel und Gretel. This weekly tradition survived to this day, evolving into the longest-running continuous classical music program in radio history. In the 1990s, the broadcast series expanded its transmissions to Europe, Australia, New Zealand, Mexico and Brazil.

=== La fanciulla del West ===
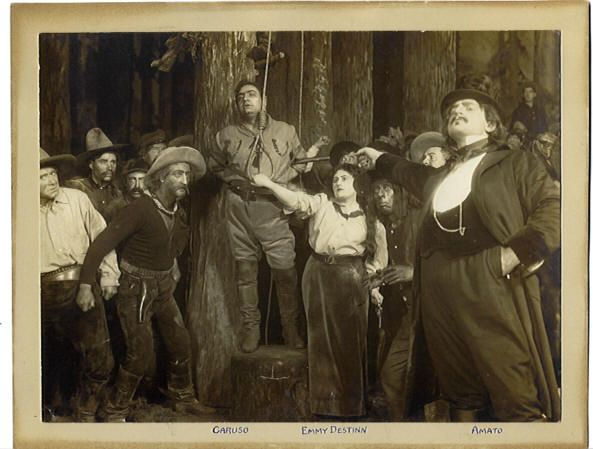
La Fanciulla del West, world premiere in New York, 1910

It took some time for the New York public and press to appreciate the quality of Giacomo Puccini's operas. Most of his works premiered far from the Metropolitan Opera—Manon Lescaut in Philadelphia in 1894; La bohème in Los Angeles in 1897 and San Francisco in 1898; and Madama Butterfly in Washington in 1906 (in English), followed by a tour. When Tosca premiered at the Met on 4 February 1901, starring Emma Eames, some critics were deeply shocked by the violence and the realism. One of them even called is a ″supreme relish for avant-garde sadists″. Times had changed six years later, with a breath-taking premiere of Madama Butterfly in February 1907 (in Italian), starring Geraldine Farrar, Enrico Caruso, Louise Homer and Antonio Scotti. Puccini was in the audience. The public responded with thunderous applause, and the composer was called back to the stage several times. The press lavished the highest praise on both the work and the performance.

During his stay in New York in 1907, Puccini's saw David Belasco’s play The Girl of the Golden West. The drama is set during the California Gold Rush, and the heroine is an independent woman determined to win the man she loves; she saves her lover, arrested for gold robbery, from being lynched. Puccini was immediately impressed by the play although he did not understand most of the text. He decided to set it to music, calling it his American opera. For the libretto, Puccini’s publisher recommended Carlo Zangarini, whose mother came from Colorado. As the librettist was very slow and Puccini was impatient, the author and journalist Guelfo Civinini was brought in to collaborate. In December of 1910, La fanciulla del West had its glamorous world premiere at the Metropolitan Opera, with the composer in the audience, Arturo Toscanini conducting, Emmy Destinn and Enrico Caruso in the main roles. There were 55 curtain calls, the press called it a triumph. According to the Met, the opera ″fell out of favor with audiences for a few decades following its original success″, but has rebounded in popularity in recent years.

=== Boston, Chicago, San Francisco ===
Within five years, three major American opera houses were constructed and completed:

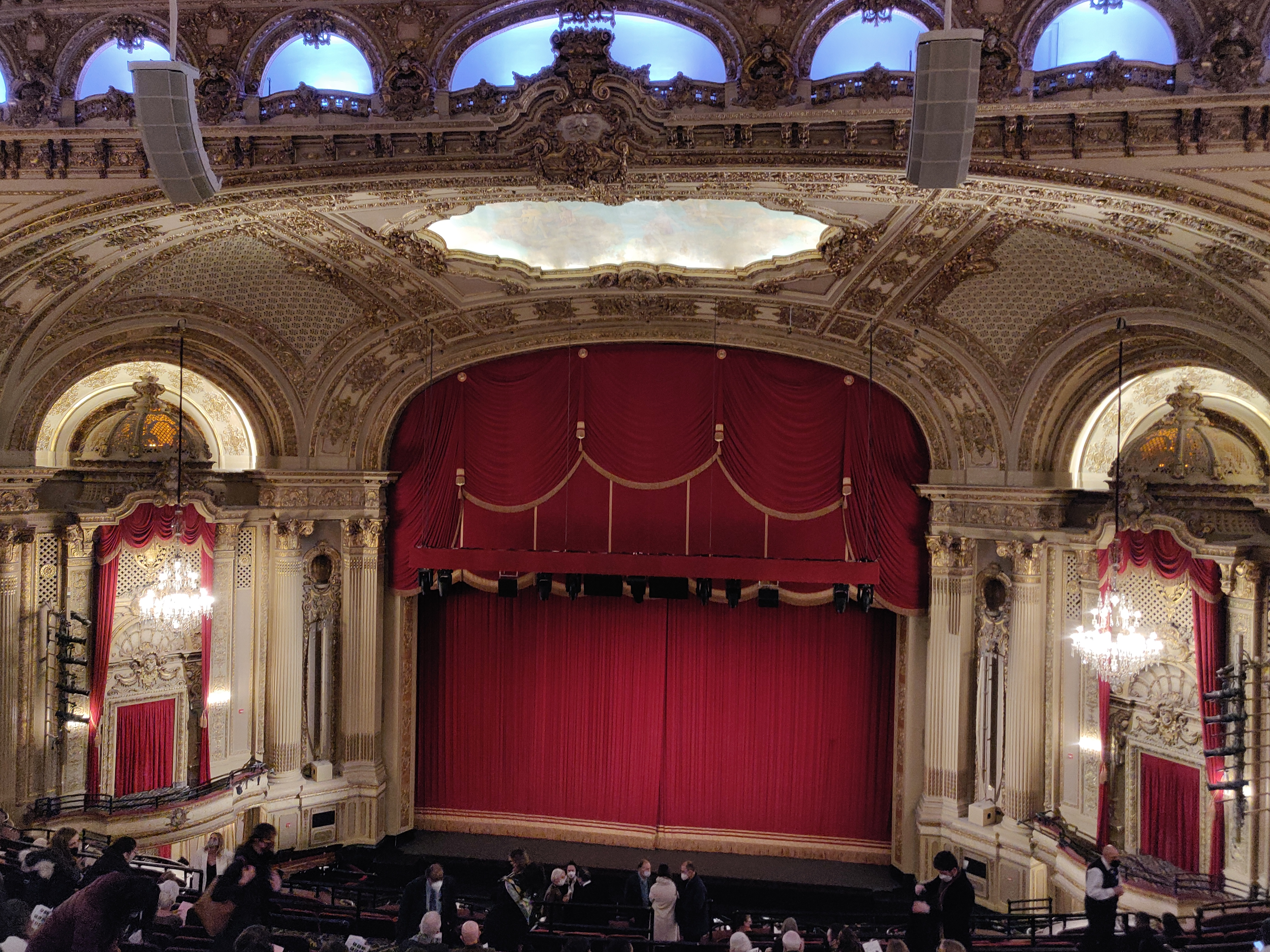
Boston Opera House

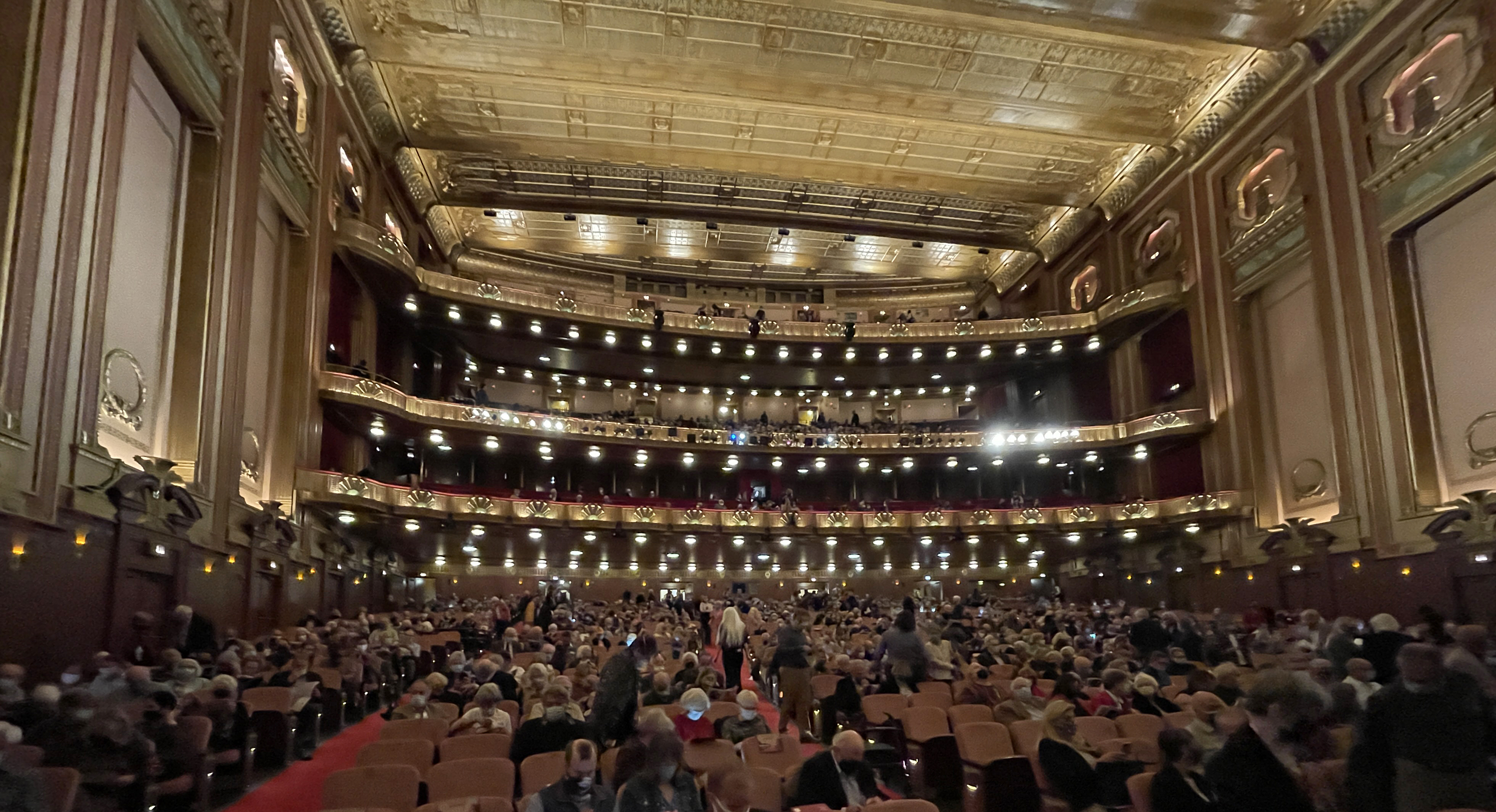
Lyric Opera Chicago

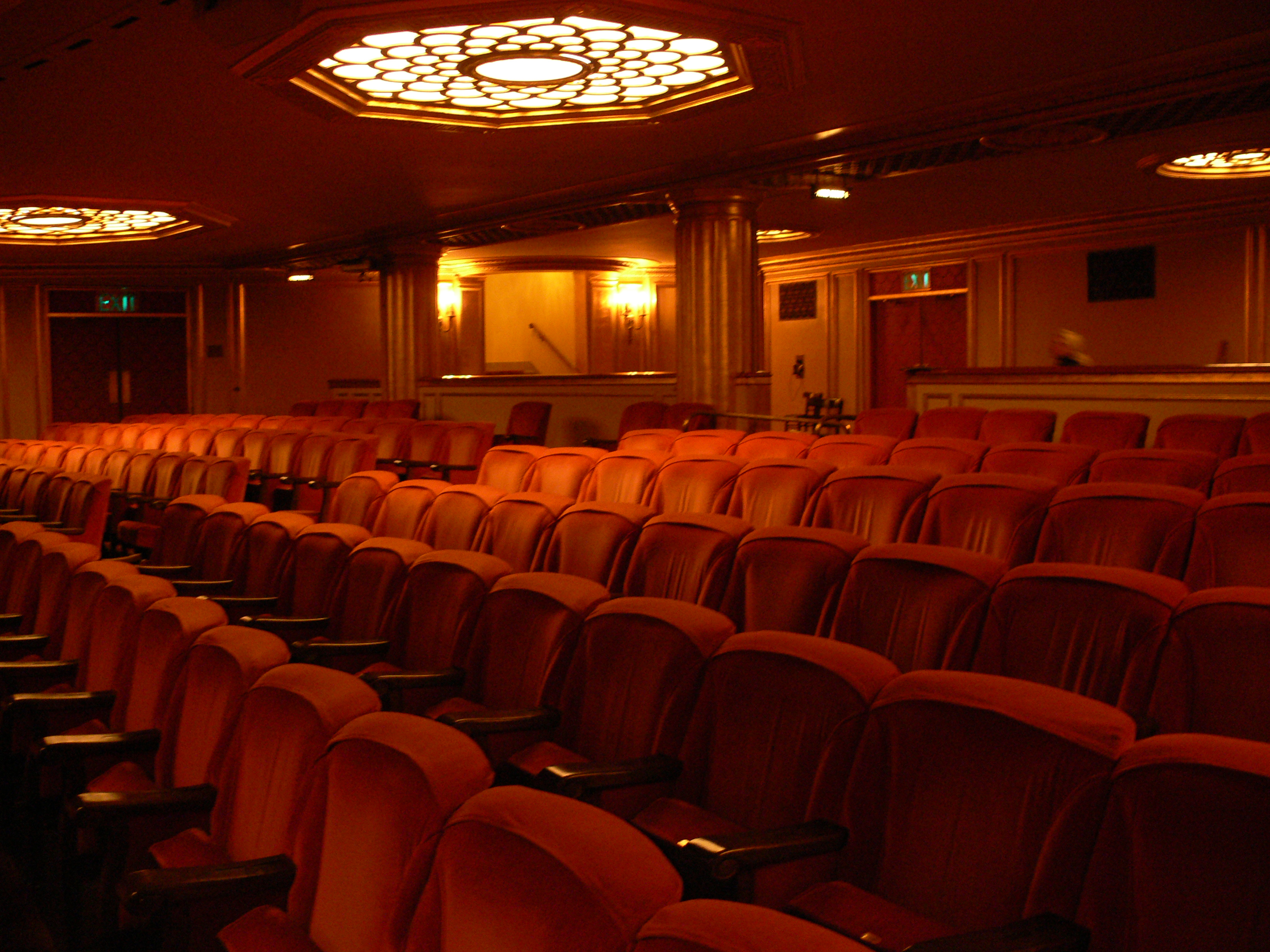
War Memorial Opera House

In 1928, the B.F. Keith Memorial Theatre was presented to the public. It operated for more than 50 years as a movie theater. From 1980 to 1990, the theatre served as the Boston Opera House, home of the Opera Company of Boston. Today it serves as the main stage for the Boston Ballet.

From 1889 to 1929, the Auditorium Theatre in Chicago was the main venue for opera performances in Chicago. In 1929, the Civic Opera Chicago was completed. The building is famous for its Art Deco grandeur with lavish decorative finishes. Although the building bears the name Civic Opera, the company that runs it is called Lyric Opera of Chicago. It opened in 1930 with Camille, starring Mary Garden in an opera by Hamilton Forrest based on the 1948 drama by Dumas.

The War Memorial Opera House was built as a monument to San Francisco’s dead from World War I. It was designed by Arthur Brown Jr. in the Beaux-Arts style, it was completed in 1932 and hosted the drafting of the Charter of the United Nations in 1945. The theater presents more than 40 performances of at least six operas annually.

=== "Truly American operas" ===
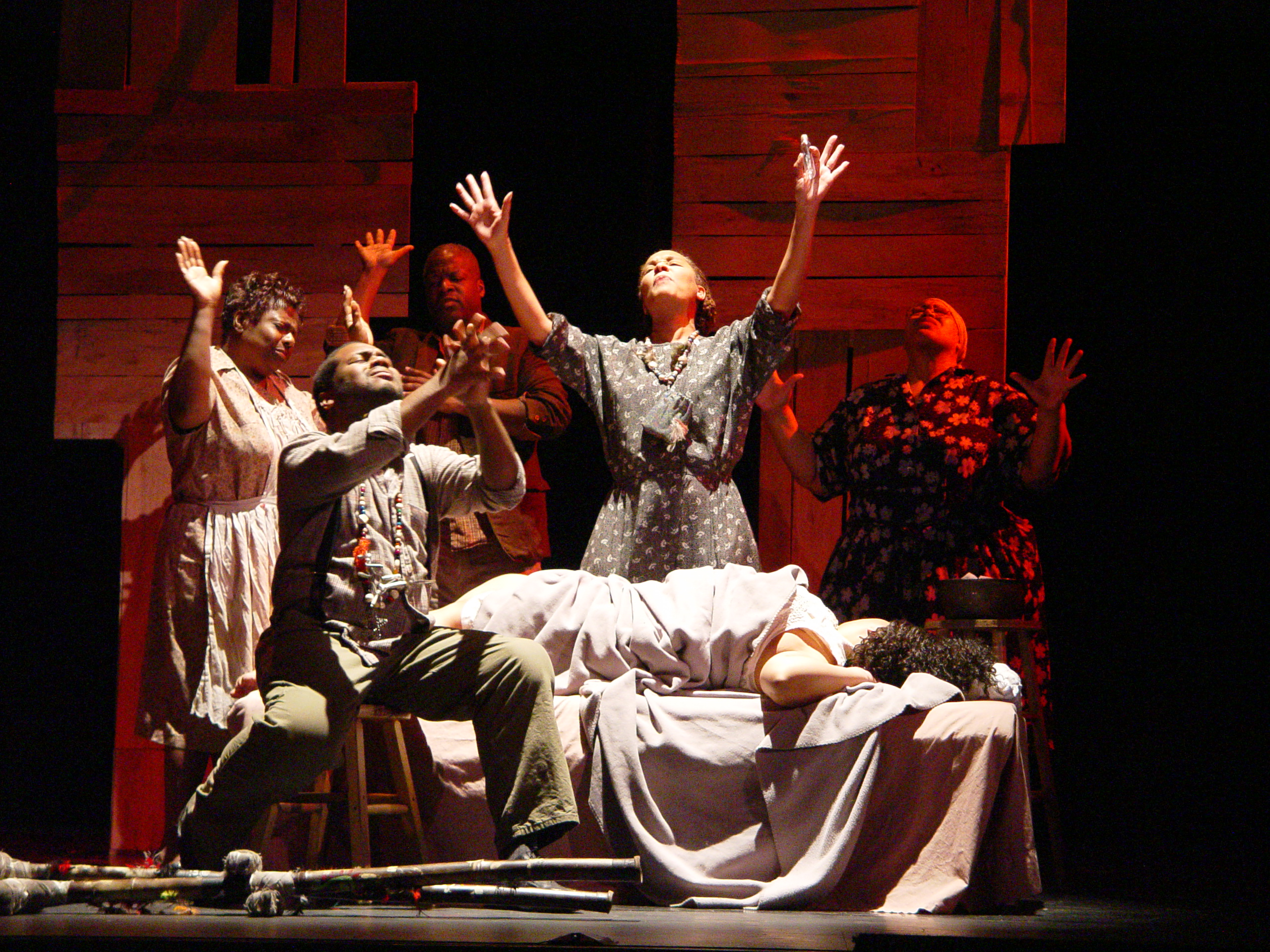
Porgy and Bess, Pittsburgh 2009

Rachel Hutchins-Viroux states: "it is generally acknowledged that the first two truly unique American operas were premiered in 1934 [respectively in 1935]. Both represented effective, new ways of setting text in English, and both incorporated uniquely American stylistic elements (hymn tunes for the former, and jazz for the latter), not to mention the local flavor given by the South Carolina setting of Gershwin’s opera."

- Virgil Thomson's Four Saints in Three Acts, based on a libretto by Gertrude Stein, (February 7, 1934 in Hartford)
- George Gershwin's Porgy and Bess (September 30, 1935 in Boston)

The first opera was an immediate success, but subsequently disappeared from the repertoire. The latter, however, became a long-running success and the emblematic "Black Opera", despite being written and composed by three white people.

The American Indian opera also emerged in the early 20th century, as both Native American composers and librettists, such as Zitkala-Ša (Yankton Dakota) and non-Native composers and librettists drew on Native American characters, stories, and music to create new operas.

=== Refugees from Hitler occupied countries ===
Between 1933 and 1940, a number of opera artists fled the parts of Europe occupied by Hitler and his troops. Among them were several singers—led by Lotte Lehmann and Alexander Kipnis—as well as conductors and stage directors, but above all, composers, many from former Austria. Almost all of them, whose operas were performed across Europe—some with great success—changed their field of activity. Only one of them—the German Kurt Weill—succeeded in adapting his musical style to American tastes; he achieved successes on Broadway in 1941 and 1947 with Lady in the Dark and Street Scene. The latter was based on a 1929 play about a domestic tragedy in a tenement during an oppressive heat wave. The play was by Elmer Rice, the lyrics by Langston Hughes. The opera was described by John McWhorter as "dark and hopless, with angular melodies and busy ensembles – yet all of it immediately relatableon first hearing."

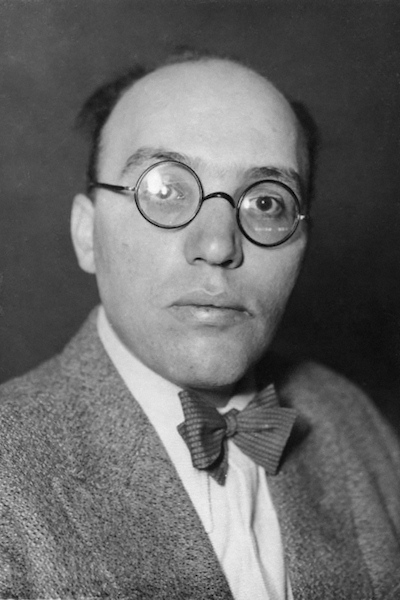
Kurt Weill

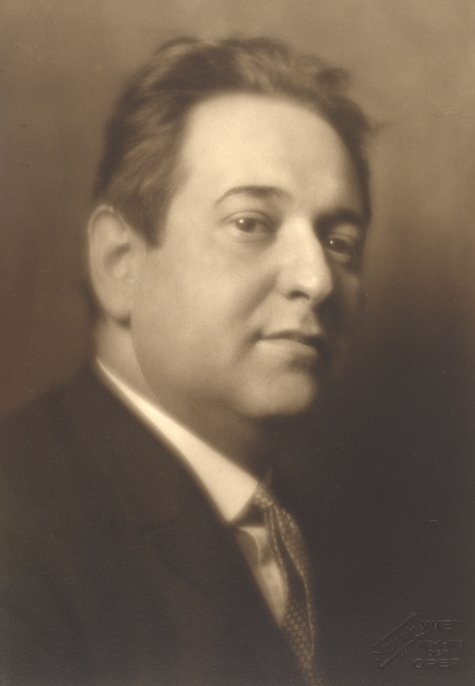
Erich Wolfgang Korngold

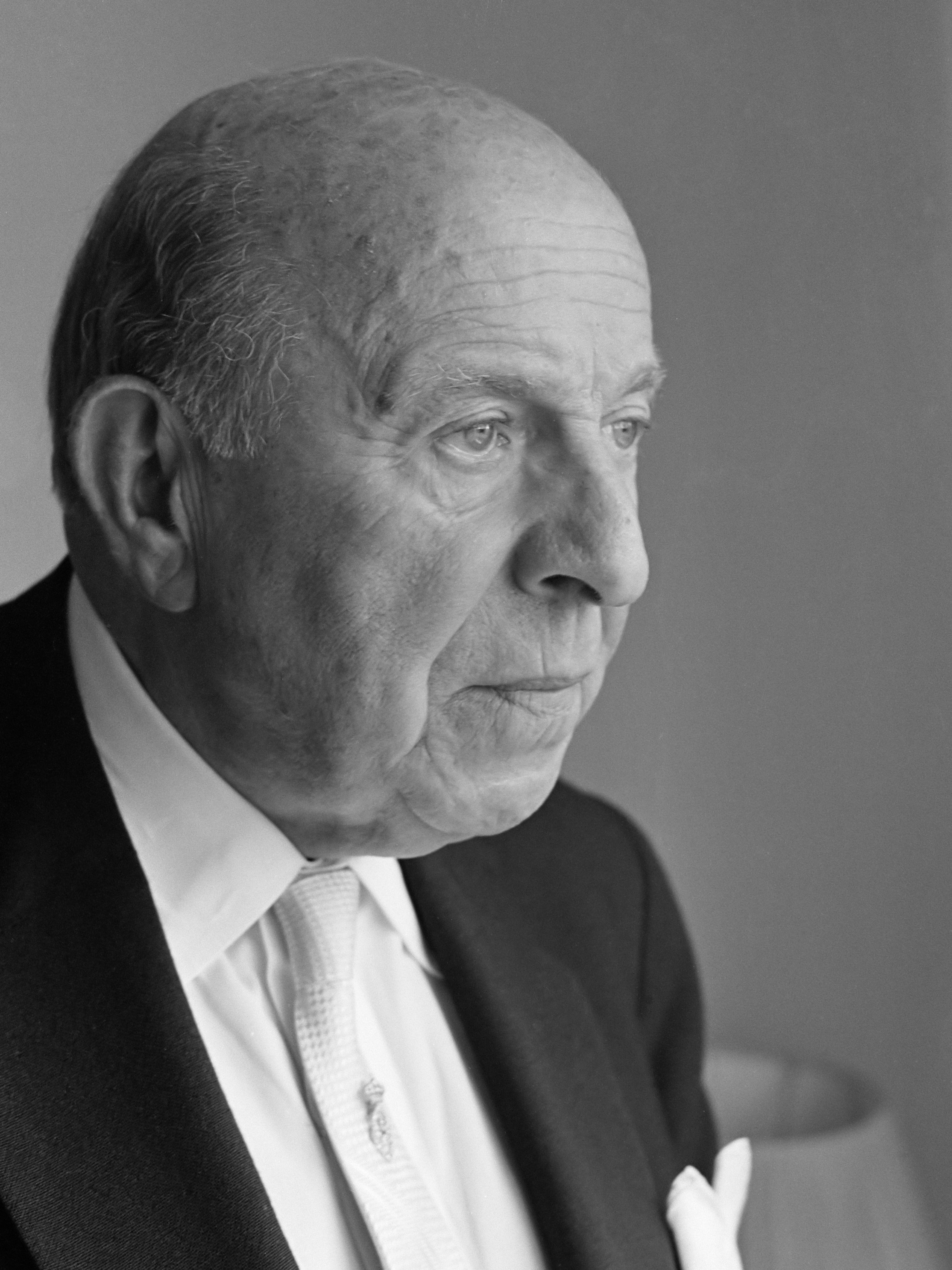
Robert Stolz

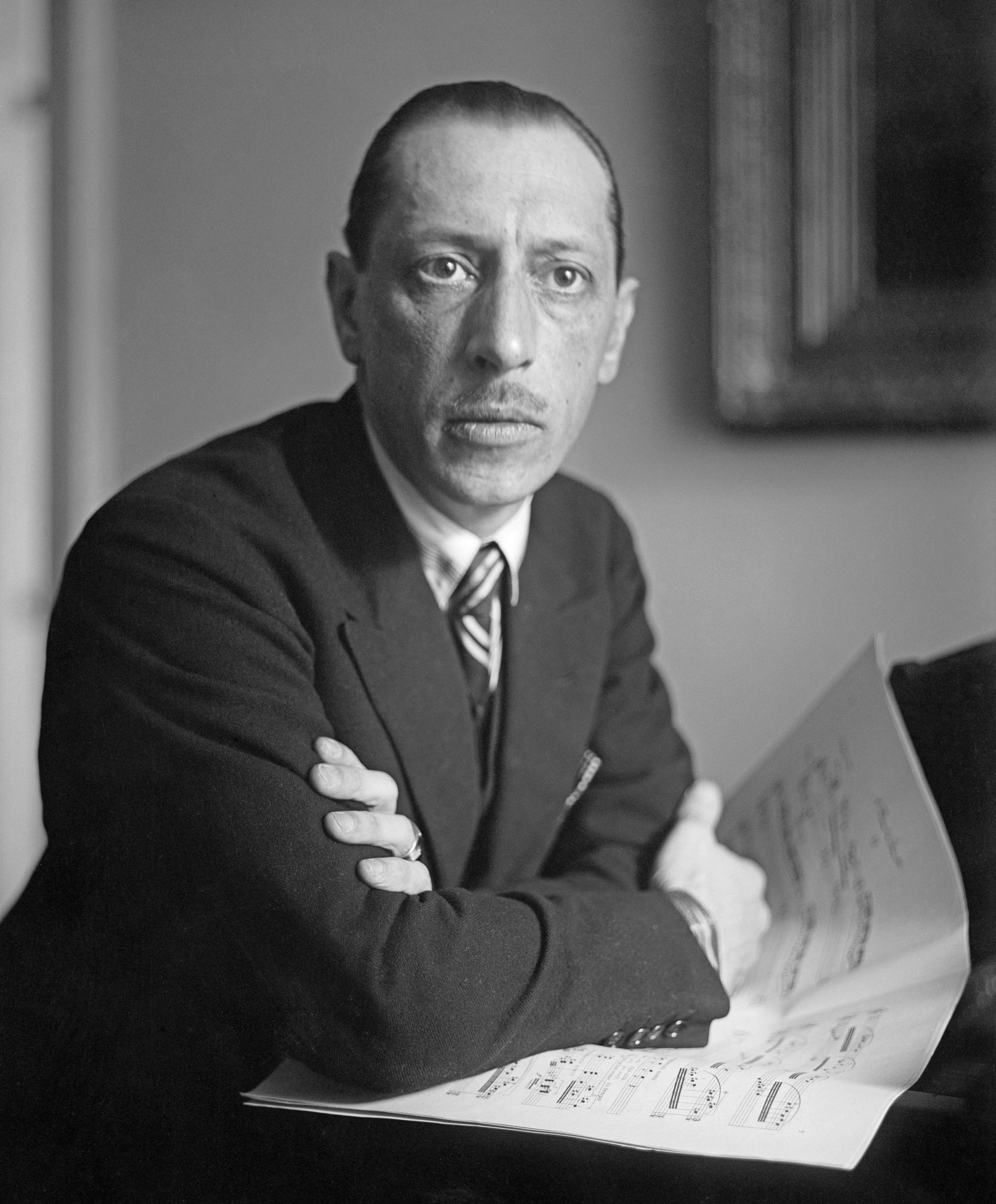
Igor Stravinsky

Erich Wolfgang Korngold, known in Europe for his operas—such as Die tote Stadt—devoted himself almost exclusively to film music while in exile. He lived in Hollywood, worked for Warner Bros. and won two Academy Awards. He became an American citizen in 1943 and retired from film music in 1947. Robert Stolz, who was known in Europe for his operettas, saved the lives of at least twenty Jews by smuggling them from Germany to Austria in his limousine between 1933 and 1938. When Hitler occupied Austria, Robert Stolz opted for emigration. During his exile, he too devoted himself to film on the one hand, and to popular concerts featuring operetta music on the other. He worked in Hollywood and in New York until 1946, thereafter returning to Austria. He achieved two nominations for Academy Awards. In 1943, he conducted The Merry Widow by Franz Lehár on Broadway.

In contrast, Alexander von Zemlinsky met the opposite fate; he failed to find his footing in exile, and his final opera, Der König Kandaules, was rejected by the Met, although his former pupil Artur Bodanzky, now conductor at the Met, championed the opera. Zemlisky was forced to pivot to writing small-scale commercial pieces, suffered a series of strokes and died in obscurity in 1942. Arnold Schoenberg and Ernst Krenek, too, failed to gain a foothold in the American music scene, primarily because they were unwilling to deviate from twelve-tone technique. Schönberg responded to an offer from Irving Thalberg by demanding an astronomical fee and absolute artistic freedom; no collaboration ensued. This episode can also be found in the opera Schoenberg in Hollywood (2018) by Tod Machover. Both Schoenberg and Krenek secured teaching positions at various universities, thereby ensuring their survival.

Igor Stravinsky was a completely different case. Originally Russian, he lived in exile in Paris for many years and had also acquired French citizenship. He was not Jewish and therefore not directly at risk, but he was defamed in the 1938 German exhibition Degenerate music. After three deaths in his immediate family and due to the approach of the war, he decided to emigrate to the United States. He never felt at home there and, in his new exile, wrote only one opera, The Rake's Progress, a thoroughly European work, English plot, English librettist, which premiered in Venice in 1951. This opera is considered a prime example of Neoclassicism.

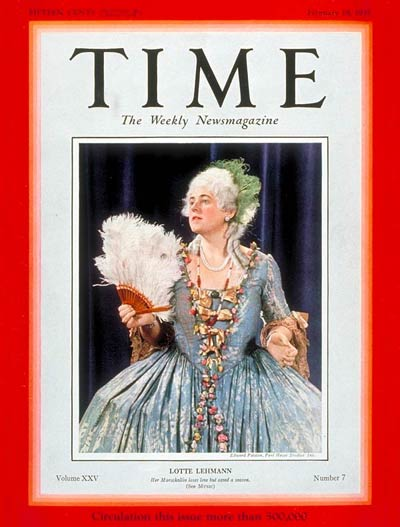
Lotte Lehmann at the Met: "Her Marschallin loses love but saved a season." Time, 1935.

A postscript on Lotte Lehmann: She did not make her debut at the Met until 1934—quite late in her career—appearing as Sieglinde and receiving standing ovations from the very first night. Further Wagner roles followed (Elisabeth in Tannhäuser, Eva, and Elsa), as well as the title role in Puccini's Tosca and the Marschallin in Der Rosenkavalier by Hugo von Hofmannsthal and Richard Strauss. She bade farewell to the New York audience in the latter role in February 1945. She was among those artists who did not have to flee for racial reasons but who deeply opposed the Nazi regime and therefore left their homeland of their own free will—such as Marlene Dietrich, Bertolt Brecht, the Mann family, Erich Maria Remarque, conductor Fritz Busch, and composers Paul Hindemith and Robert Stolz.

=== Television transmissions ===
When it comes to opera on television, the British and Germans were slightly ahead. BBC launched the world's first regular high-definition public television service – including opera – in late 1936, the Germans broadcast Bastien und Bastienne by Mozart in 1939. On March 10, 1940, NBC hosted a landmark broadcast featuring the Metropolitan Opera, performing live scenes from Carmen, Pagliacci and The Barber of Seville. The 1950s brought us operas commissioned specifically for the television format, i.e. Amahl and the Night Visitors by Gian Carlo Menotti on Christmas Eve 1951. It attracted five million viewers, then an astronomical number. The NBC Opera Theatre was in existence from 1949 to 1964, it aired about five full productions per season, usually on Sunday afternoons. In October 1953, they broadcast Bizet's Carmen, marking the first time an opera was televised in color. After commercial networks abandoned opera, public broadcasting stepped in, this time capturing actual live stage performances, predominantly from the Met. In March 1977, the Metropolitan Opera officially entered regular TV programming with Live from the Met – first with a landmark performance of Puccini's La bohème, starring Luciano Pavarotti and Renata Scotto.

=== National Negro Opera Company ===
Singer Mary Cardwell Dawson was devoted to bringing opera to African American audiences. In 1941, she presented the opera Aida at the National Association of Negro Musicians convention. Later that year she launched her National Negro Opera Company (NNOC) with a performance at Pittsburgh's Syria Mosque. Pittsburgh remained the home base of the company, but during its 21-year run, NNOC also mounted productions in Washington D.C., New York City, and Chicago. The company disbanded in 1962 upon Dawson's death.

=== San Francisco Opera ===
San Francisco Opera was founded by Gaetano Merola (1881–1953), an Italian conductor, in 1923. The Company first performaned at the Cityʹs Civic Auditorium. Nine years later, the Company moved into its new home, the War Memorial Opera House. The founder and his successor, Kurt Herbert Adler (1905–1988), an immigrant from Austria who took over in 1953, shaped the house and established it as excellent and innovative.

Lotfi Mansouri, who directed the opera house from 1988 to 2001, commissioned a number of new operas, including the following world premieres: The Death of Klinghoffer by John Adams (1992), The Dangerous Liaisons by Conrad Susa (1994), Harvey Milk by Stewart Wallace (1996), A Streetcar Named Desire by André Previn (1998), and Dead Man Walking by Jake Heggie (2000). This programm was called Pacific Visions. Mansouri also presented a series of Russian operas in cooperation with the Kirov Opera.

=== Marian Anderson ===
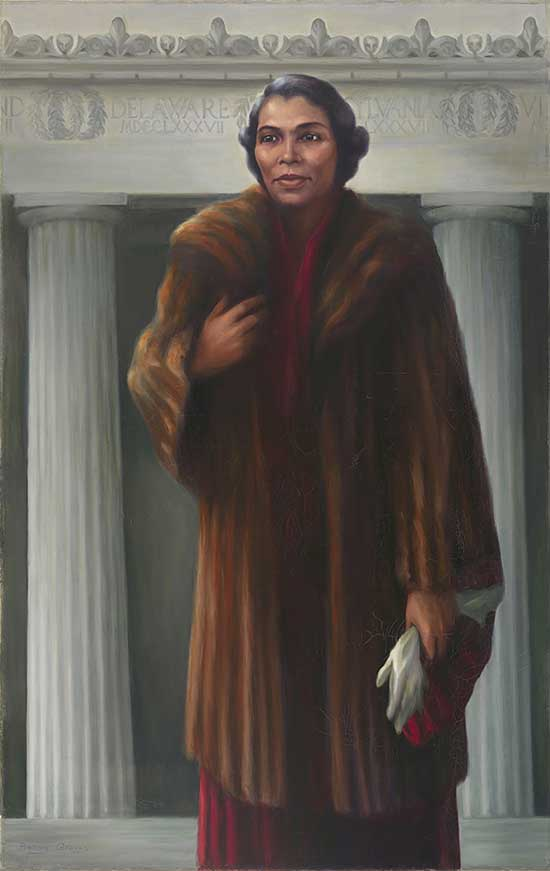
Marian Anderson, painting by Betsy Graves Reyneau

Contralto Marian Anderson, born 1897, became a symbol of the civil rights movement. After being denied the right to sing at Constitution Hall in Washington, D.C., in 1939 by the Daughters of the American Revolution due to her race, First Lady Eleanor Roosevelt resigned from the organization and helped arrange Anderson's iconic performance on the steps of the Lincoln Memorial where 75,000 people attended.

On January 7, 1955, Marian Anderson was the first Black artist to perform in a leading role at the Met. Although she was already nearing the end of her career, her presence was witnessed as a moral earthquake for the institution. General Manager Rudolf Bing cast her as Ulrica in Un ballo in maschera. The audience erupted in thunderous applause before she could even sing her first note. Her performance opened the field to such stars as Leontyne Price, Grace Bumbry, Jessye Norman, and George Shirley, redefining who could occupy the center of the operatic stage, changing the industry itself.

Just 20 days later, baritone Robert McFerrin followed Anderson as the first male African American soloist at the Met. He sang Amonasro in Verdi's Aida. When the Met opened its new home at Lincoln Center in 1966, Samuel Barber's Anthony and Cleopatra was performed. The female lead was sung by Leontyn Price.

=== Post-war period ===
After World War II, the Ford Foundation began financially supporting the New York City Opera, in an attempt to promote more new American operas. The American Opera Society (founded in 1951) played a crucial role in commissioning and promoting new American works, contributing to the global operatic repertoire.

During the post-war period, American composers such as Aaron Copland, Samuel Barber, and Gian Carlo Menotti emerged and gained worldwide recognition for their remarkable contributions to opera. Their works – for example The Tender Land (1954), Vanessa (1958) or The Consul (1950) – showcased a sense of confidence and individuality in American operatic expression. In 1958, at the World's fair in Brussels, American culture was represented by Susannah, an opera by Carlisle Floyd, first performed at the Florida State University in 1955. Susannah Polk, an innocent girl of 18 years, is targeted as a sinner in the small mountain town of New Hope Valley in Tennessee. In 1957, Susannah had won the New York Music Critics' Circle Award. It became one of the most performed American operas.

In 1956, at the Central City Opera in Colorado, Douglas Moore's The Ballad of Baby Doe had its world premiere. Especially famous are five arias, all sung by the title heroine: "Letter Aria," "Willow Song," "I Knew it Was Wrong", "Gold is a Fine Thing", and "Always Through the Changing." Also Robert Wards The Crucible (1961) deserves to be mentioned, an opera based on the play by Arthur Miller.

=== Maria Callas ===
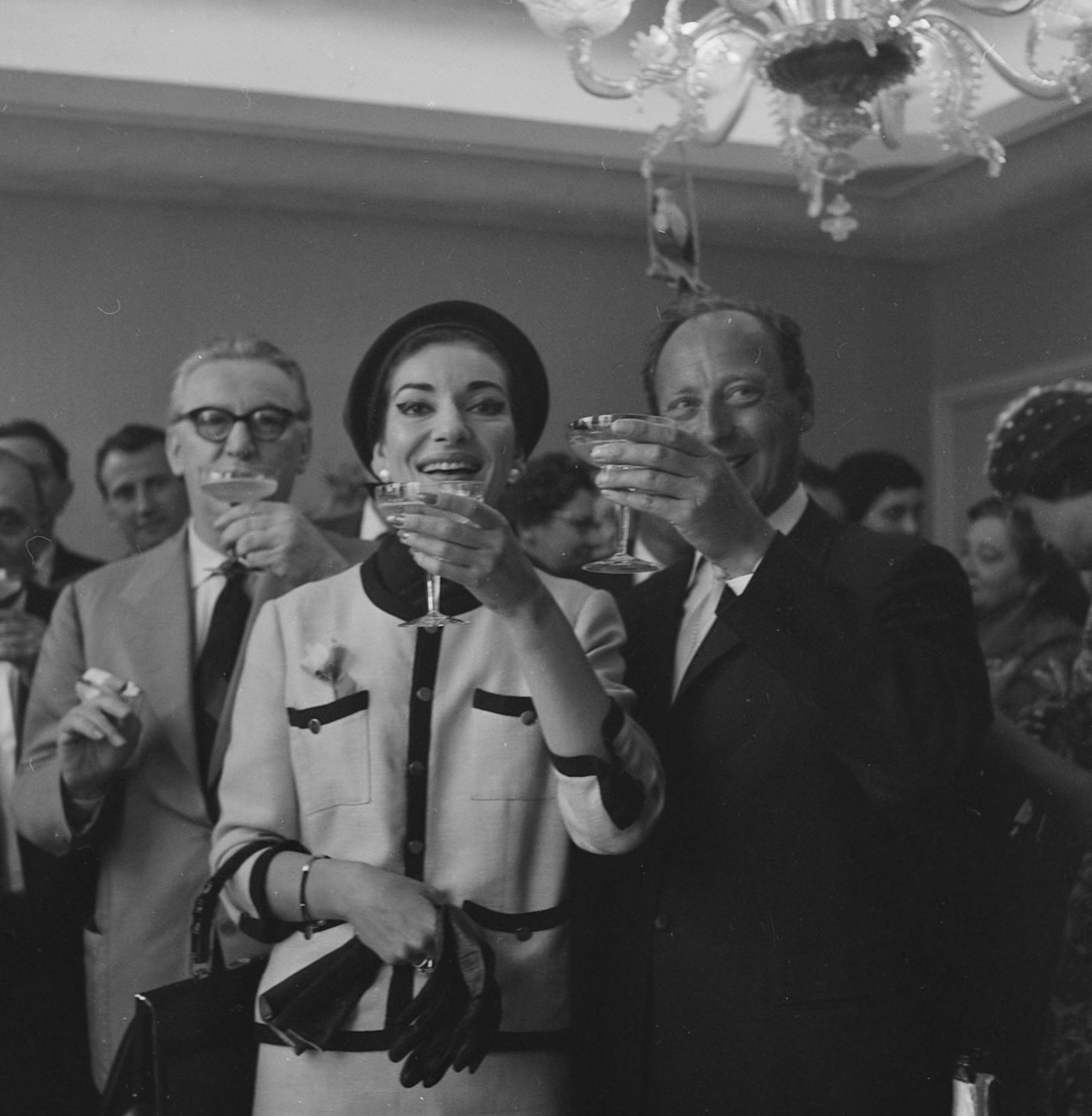
Maria Callas, 1959

The name Maria Callas is associated with perfectionism, glamour, and scandals. She was born in New York City on December 2, 1923, which made her, the daughter of Greek immigrants, an American citizen. Nevertheless, she had little career luck in her home country, she sang only 21 performances at the Met. As a little girl, she performed in two school productions of Gilbert and Sullivan operettas at New York P.S. 164. In 1945, the Met offered her a beginner's contract with Madama Butterly and Fidelio on tour in Philadelphia; she declined. In 1946, she was engaged to re-open the opera house of Chicago as Turandot, but the company folded before opening. Her career then started in Europe, in Verona (in La Gioconda, 1946), Venice (with Wagner and Bellini), Florence and Catania (as Norma), Turin, Rome and Naples (as Turandot), and finally at La Scala in Milan (as Aida, 1950). While she rushed from success to success in Europe and Latin America, in Buenos Aires in 1949, and with the season opening at the Scala in 1951, the USA hesitated with invitations. In 1950, her agent had written to General Manager Rudolf Bing, that she was ″very anxious to be in the company of this very well-known theatre″, offering her appearances for the very modest fee of 200 US-$ per night while her fees elsewhere were skyrocketing. Bing did not reply for more than ten months. Then he invited her for the opening of the 1951-52 season, but the singer and the manager could not agree about certain details. In the spring of 1953, her debut in La traviata at the Met was scheduled, but the U.S. State Department declined to grant her husband a visa. It wasn't until 1954 that an earnest invitation arrived from the Lyric Opera of Chicago. There she debuted in 1954 and 1955 − singing the title roles of Norma, La traviata, Lucia di Lammermoor and Madama Butterfly as well as Elvira in I puritani and Leonora in Il trovatore, earning 2.000 Dollar per night (the last offer by Mr. Bing was 800 $). Her Met debut took place on October 29, 1956 – opening the season with Norma, with a fee of 1.000 $ and an enthusiastic reception. This was followed by the title roles in Tosca and Lucia di Lammermoor. A scene from Act II of Tosca was televised by The Ed Sullivan Show toward the end of November. The premiere at the Met and the TV appearance marked her sudden rise to opera stardom in the USA. She was still hated by a small group of opera lovers, but most visitors were devotedly enthusiastic.

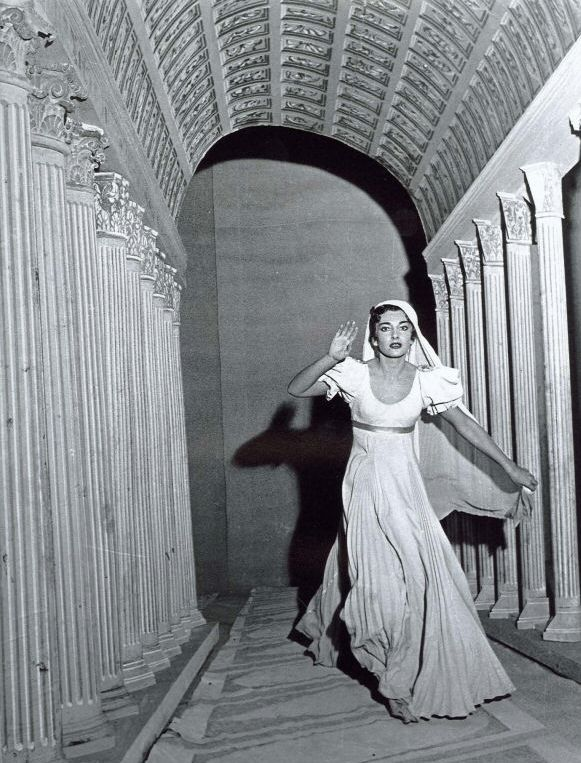
La Vestale, 1954

In 1957, she was scheduled to open the season in San Francisco. Disagreements arose, leading to her cancellation. The general manager of the San Francisco Opera, Kurt Adler, barred her from performing in any other operas in the United States for a certain period. Between 1958 and 1959, she performed three roles at the Dallas Opera — Médée, Violetta and Lucia. In February and March 1958 she returned to the Met — as Violetta, Lucia and Tosca. Thereafter, a protracted scandal unfolded. Rudolf Bing, considered authoritarian and reactionary regarding the Met's repertoire, wanted her to alternate between singing Lady Macbeth and Violetta Valery in La traviata during the tour. She refused on artistic grounds, arguing that it was impossible to switch between a highly dramatic role and a coloratura part in such short intervals. Bing then expelled her, via telegram. She responded, via television. In January 1959, she returned triumphantly to New York and took on the leading female role in a concert performance of Il pirata at Carnegie Hall. The audience roared with enthusiasm.

Six years later, a kind of reconciliation took place. Rudolf Bing invited Callas to appear twice as Tosca at the Met. The house was completely sold out. People queued for days to get tickets and slept on the streets. Again, there were rapturous applause. In 1966, she renounced her American citizenship, hoping for a marriage that would never take place.

=== Overlaps with Broadway ===
It is difficult to draw a line between opera on the one hand, and operetta and musical on the other. Two masterpieces of American composers were first presented on Broadway: Porgy and Bess (1935) and West Side Story (1957). The former is now firmly established in the operatic repertoire, i.e. at the Met, while Bernstein's musical still runs as entertainment in the US, whereas in Europe it is part of the canon of many opera houses. A similar fate befalls My Fair Lady, Candide and many works by Richard Rodgers, Stephen Sondheim or Andrew Lloyd Webber, which belong to both worlds or stand in between of them.

Also Regina, an opera by Marc Blitzstein based on the Lilian Hellman play The Little Foxes, premiered on Broadway in 1949. Regina has been said to represent American verismo and to straddle the line between entertainment and so-called serious music. The work gained better success in 1953 at the City Centre Opera in a new version with greatly expanded orchestration, giving the work a more "operatic" sound. The opera represents an ardent criticism of capitalism.

=== The big divide ===
In the 1950s and 1960s, the stark difference between Europe and the United States became apparent in the realm of opera. First, American opera houses depended on both ticket sales and sponsorships, while the operation of many European opera houses was secured through government subsidies. Second, audience taste defined American stage aesthetics, whereas in Europe, certain experiments were possible, such as those known as Regietheater. Third, the box office determined the fate of new operas. The twelve-tone music that dominated Europe and its successors had no chance in America. Innovations there took place on Broadway, as seen in Porgy and Bess and West Side Story. Storytelling and compelling music were fundamental prerequisites for success in the USA.

Attempts to establish twelve-tone music on American stages ultimately failed. Leopold Stokowski presented Wozzeck in Philadelphia in 1931, Lulu was performed in Santa Fe in 1963, and Moses und Aron was on the program in Boston in 1966. Karl V. from 1934 has not yet been performed in the United States. There were also a few American attempts to use this technique for operas – Hugo Weisgall's Six Characters in Search of an Author (1959), Roger Sessions' Montezuma (1964), and George Perle's Gulliver (1975). However, none of these achieved a permanent place in the repertoire.

=== Festivals ===
Following the example of the first European festivals – Bayreuth (1876), Verona (1913), Salzburg (1920) and Glyndebourne (1934) – in the United States, too, several opera festivals were established in the second half of the 20th century. The Santa Fe Opera and the Glimmerglass Festival have emerged as platforms for showcasing innovation, experimentation, and the vibrant array of voices within the operatic tradition.

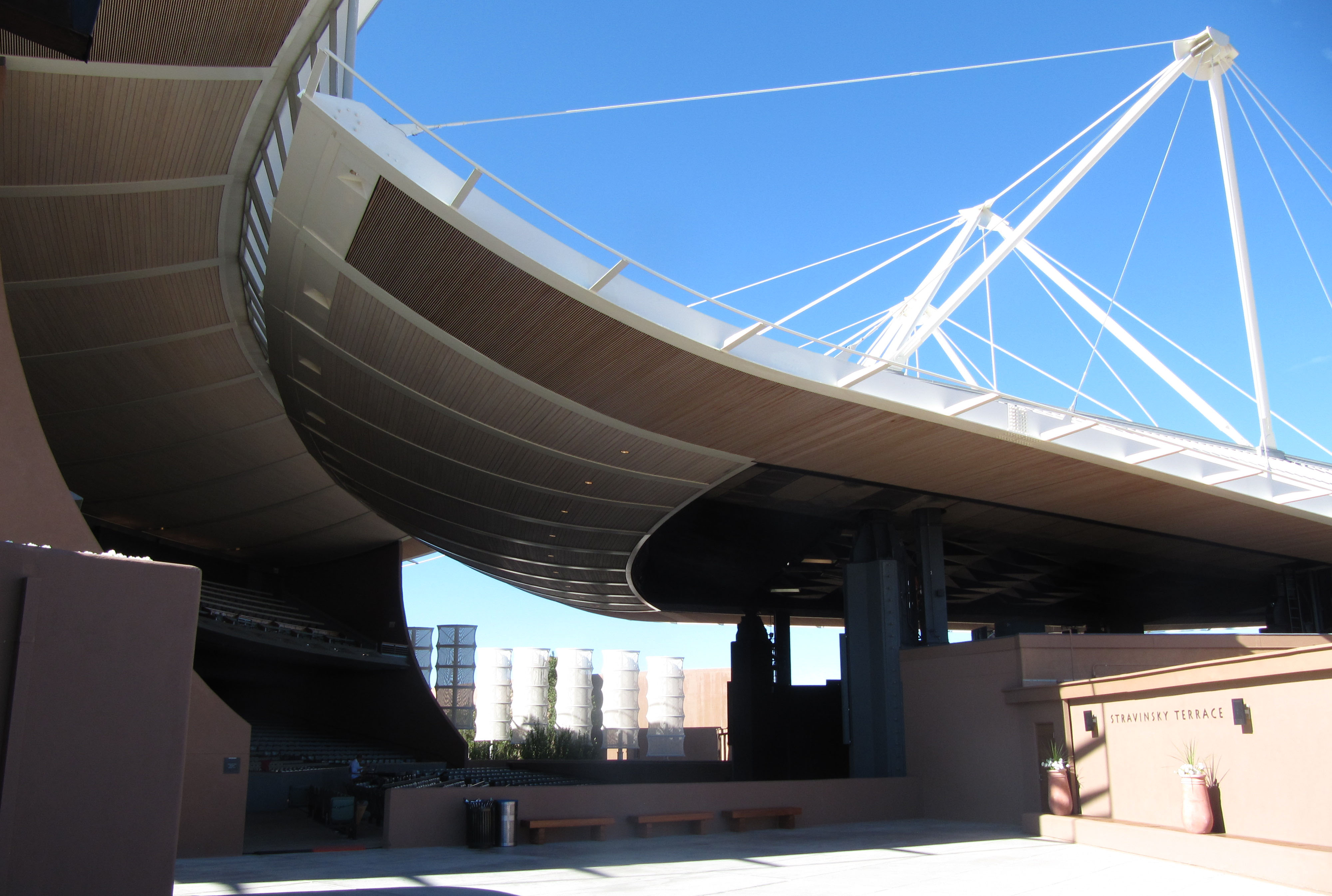
Santa Fe Opera

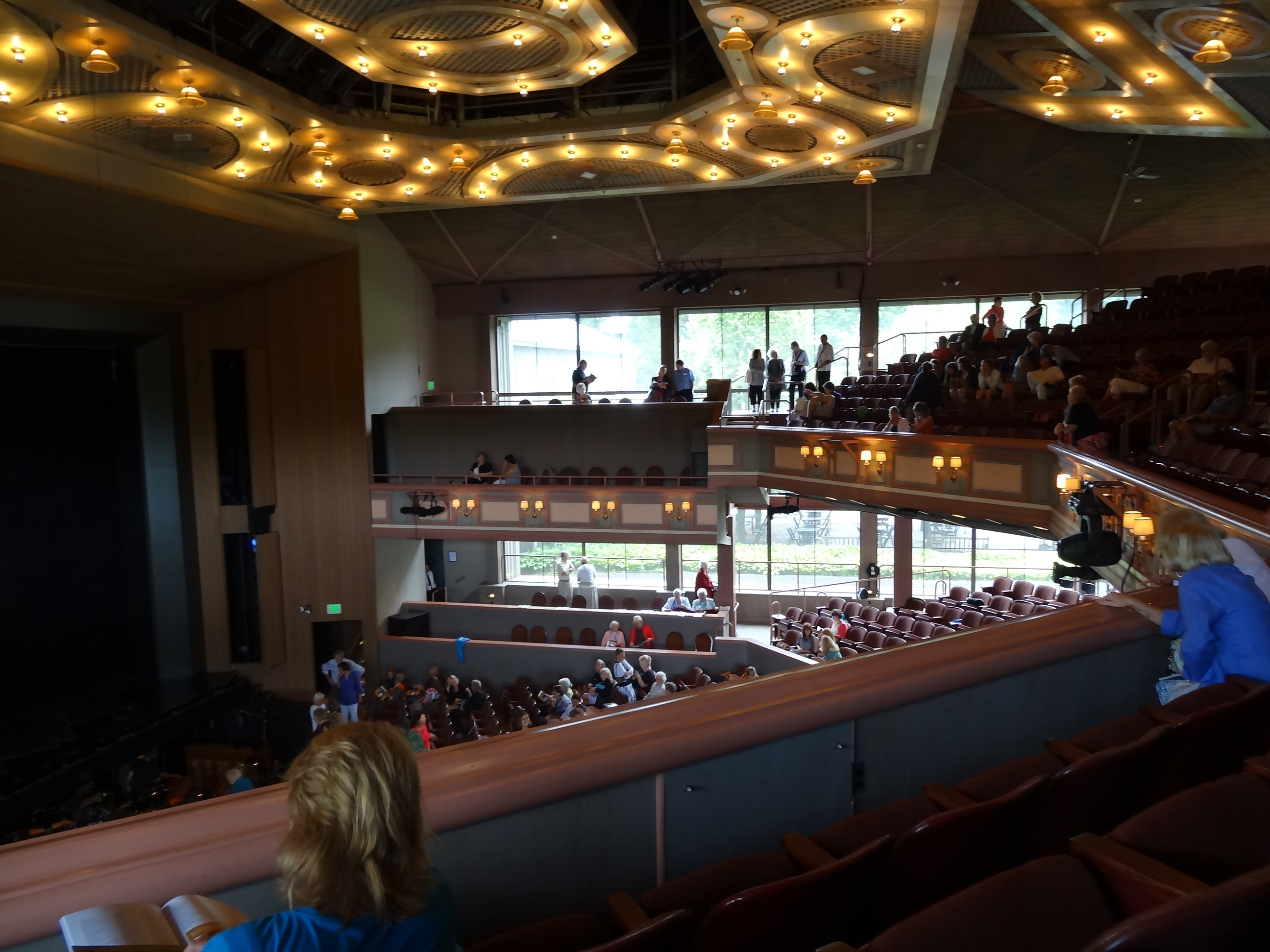
Glimmerglass Festival

In 1957, the Santa Fe Opera was founded, the only outdoor theatre in America only designed for opera at the time. It seated 480 and opened with Puccinis Madama Butterfly. The opera was enlarged in 1968 and 1998 and now seats 2,128 plus 106 standees. The public can observe New Mexico sunsets and participate in traditional tailgate dining during the intermission.

The Wolf Trap Opera Company, too, established in 1971, became known as a premiere residency for emerging singers. It is located in Virginia, in the nation's only National Park for the Performing Arts. Through an annual audition tour, its artists are selected from among the best classical vocalists in the US.

The Glimmerglass Festival, founded in 1975, is located in Otsego County in Upstate New York. Each summer, more than 40 performances of four operas are offered. First the operas were performed in the Cooperstown High School Auditorium, in June 1987 the Alice Busch Opera Theater was opened. Since then, it is the venue of the festival.

Spoleto Festival USA was established by composer Gian Carlo Menotti in 1977 as a counterpart to the original Spoleto Festival in Italy, founded by Menotti in 1958. It is a multi-disciplinary festival with a strong focus on opera. It is located in Charleston, South Carolina.

In addition, there are summer seasons at the Opera Theatre of Saint Louis in Missouri, at the Des Moines Metro Opera in Iowa and at the Central City Opera in Colorado. They each present three to four operas every year.

=== Nine primadonnas ===
In the 19th century, it was considered good form to engage European singers for the leading roles. Americans mostly appeared only as comprimario singers. Two factors gradually changed this. Firstly, vocal training improved significantly at the turn of the century; secondly, step by step, Americans embraced the art form as their own. The Metropolitan Opera was founded in 1883, and its first tour took place in 1884, visiting Boston, Philadelphia, Chicago, St. Louis, Cincinnati, Washington D.C., and Baltimore. The enormous success of Enrico Caruso in America between 1903 and 1920 also inspired many young Americans to pursue a singing career. Besides Maria Callas and Marian Anderson, an alto, nine sopranos and mezzo-sopranos established themselves as opera stars worldwide during the 20th century:

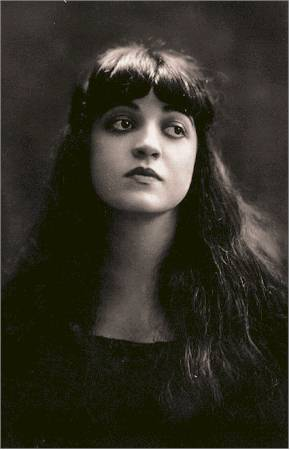
Rosa Ponselle

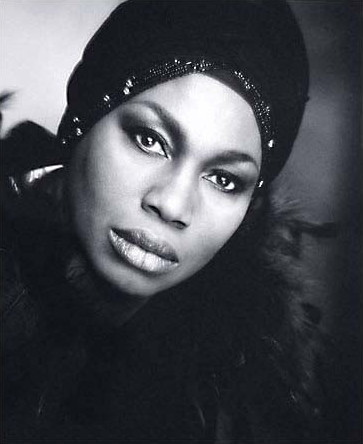
Leontyne Price

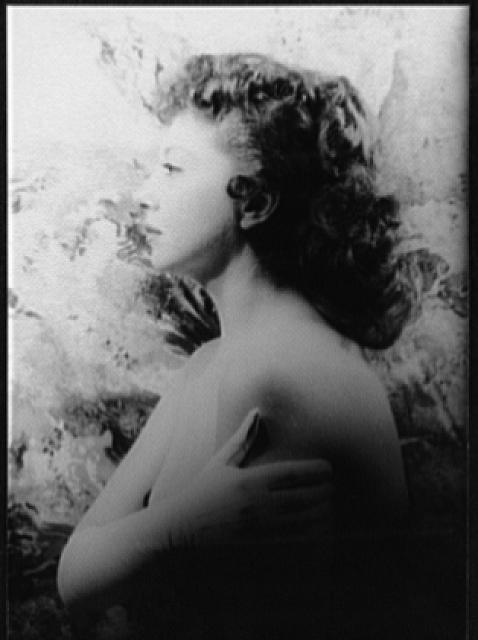
Beverly Sills

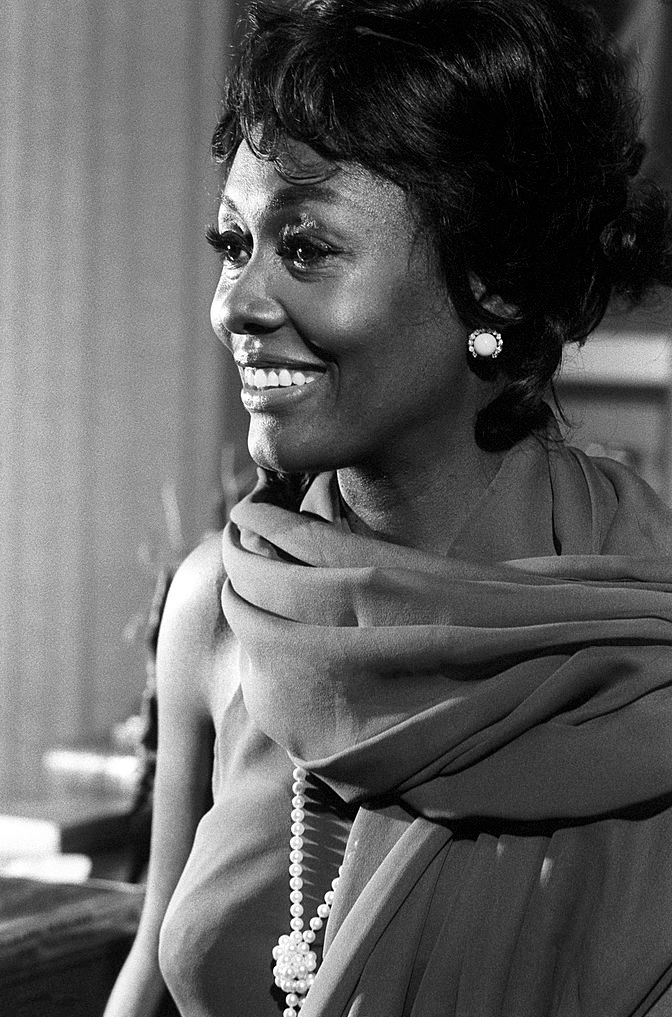
Shirley Verrett

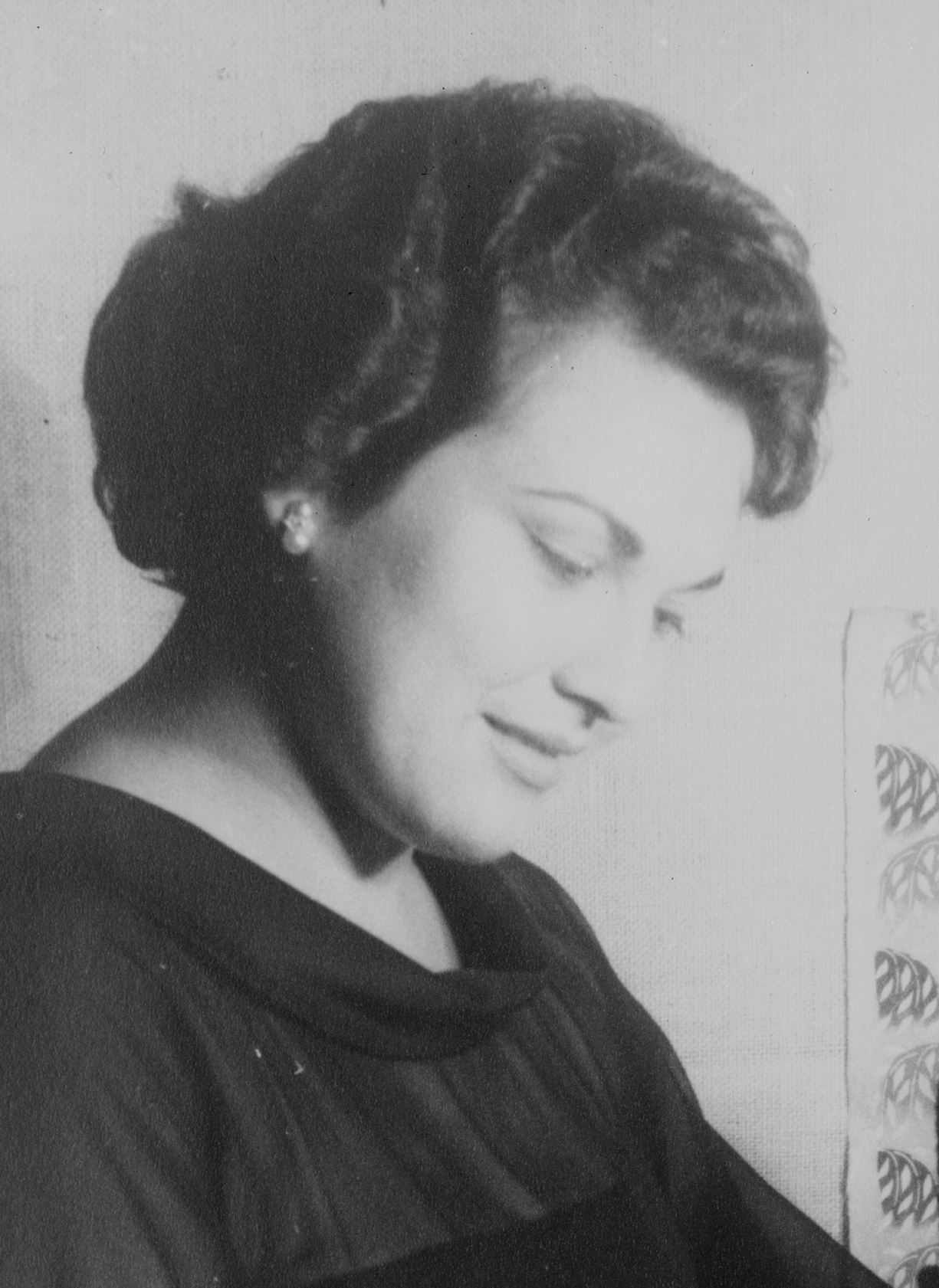
Marilyn Horne

Rosa Ponselle, born just like Anderson in 1897, was frequently cited by peers as one of the greatest voices of all time. She became a legendary Met star. Leontyne Price, born 1927, was one of the defining voices of the 20th century, she became the first Black opera singer to achieve sustained international stardom. Beverly Sills, born 1929, revitalized the bel canto repertoire for American audiences and later-on became director of New York City Opera. Shirley Verrett was a Mezzo-soprano who took the world's stages by storm. Marilyn Horne, born 1934, was a coloratura virtuoso who single-handedly resurrected forgotten bel canto and Baroque roles.

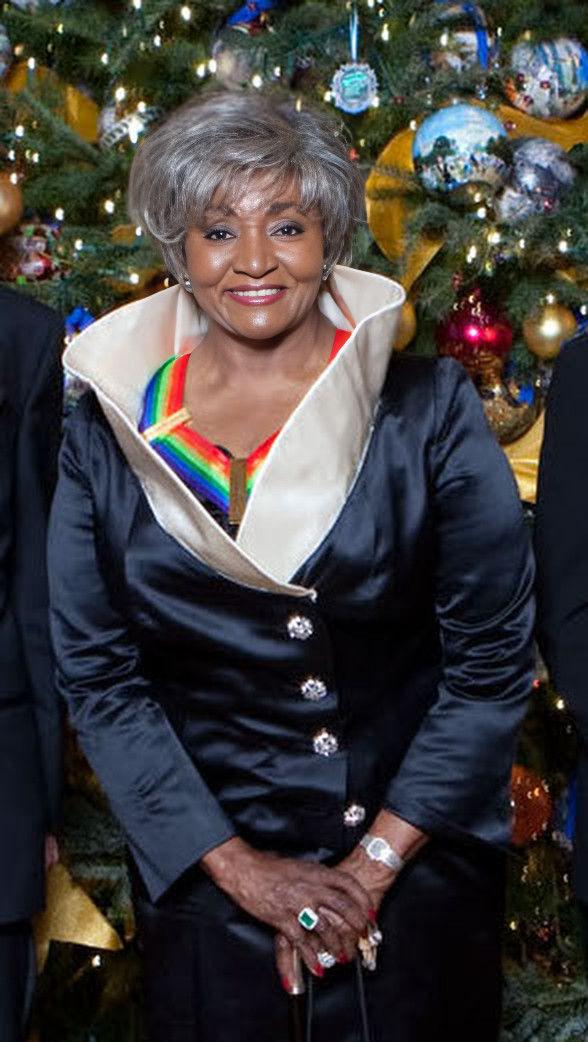
Grace Bumbry

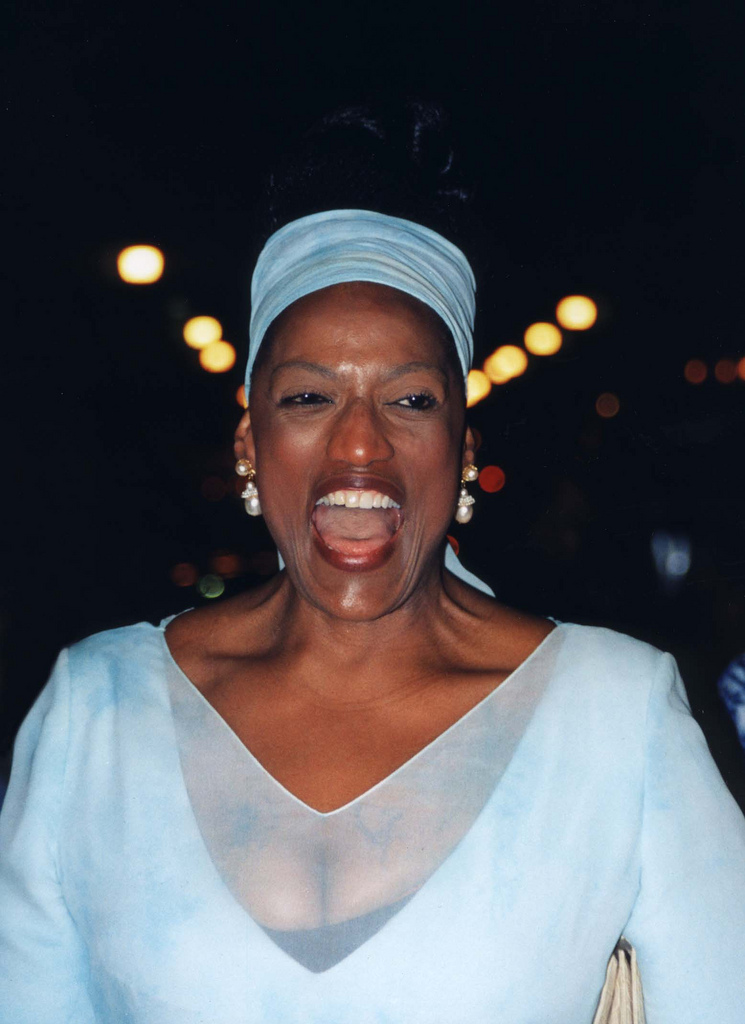
Jessye Norman

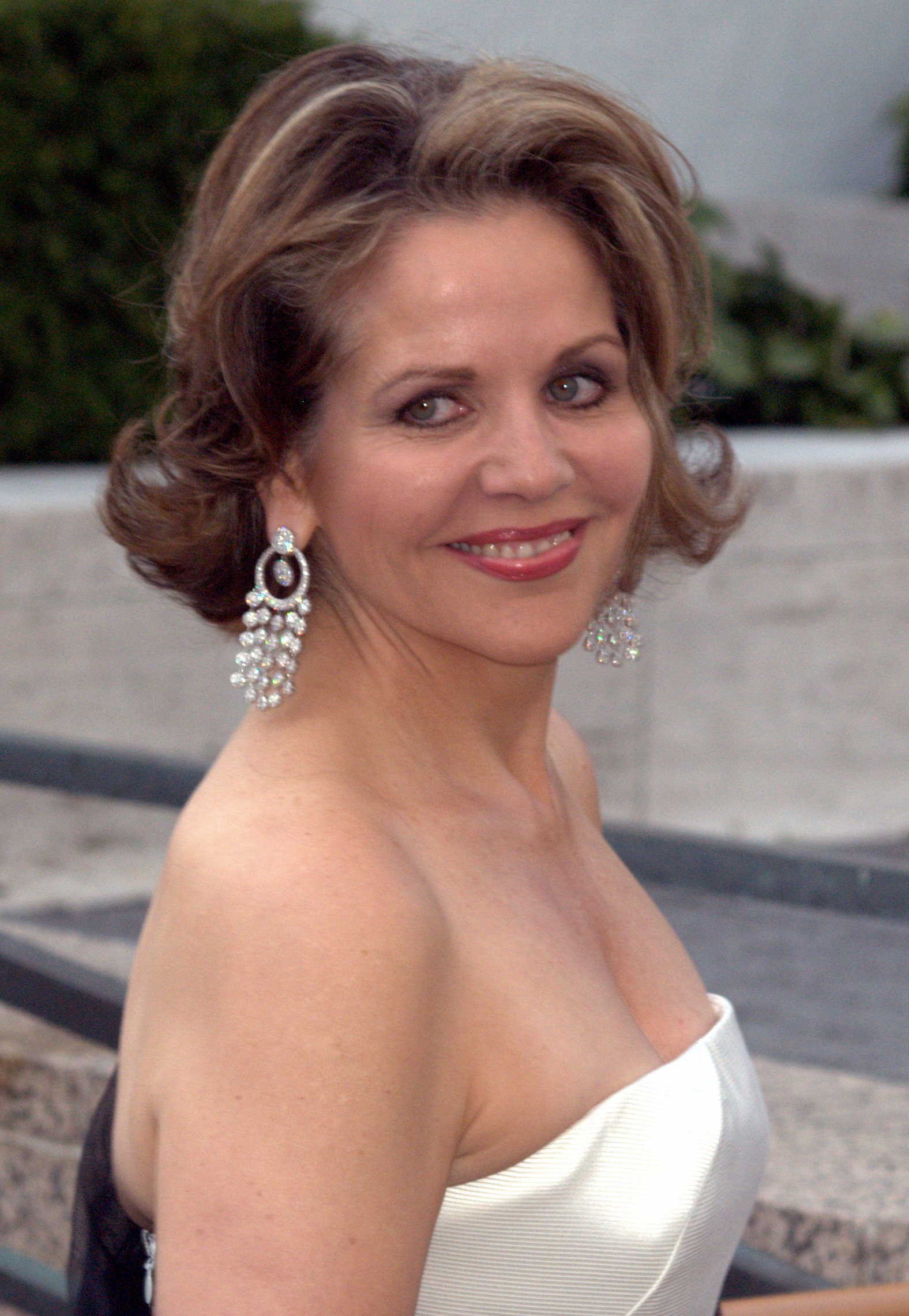
Renée Fleming

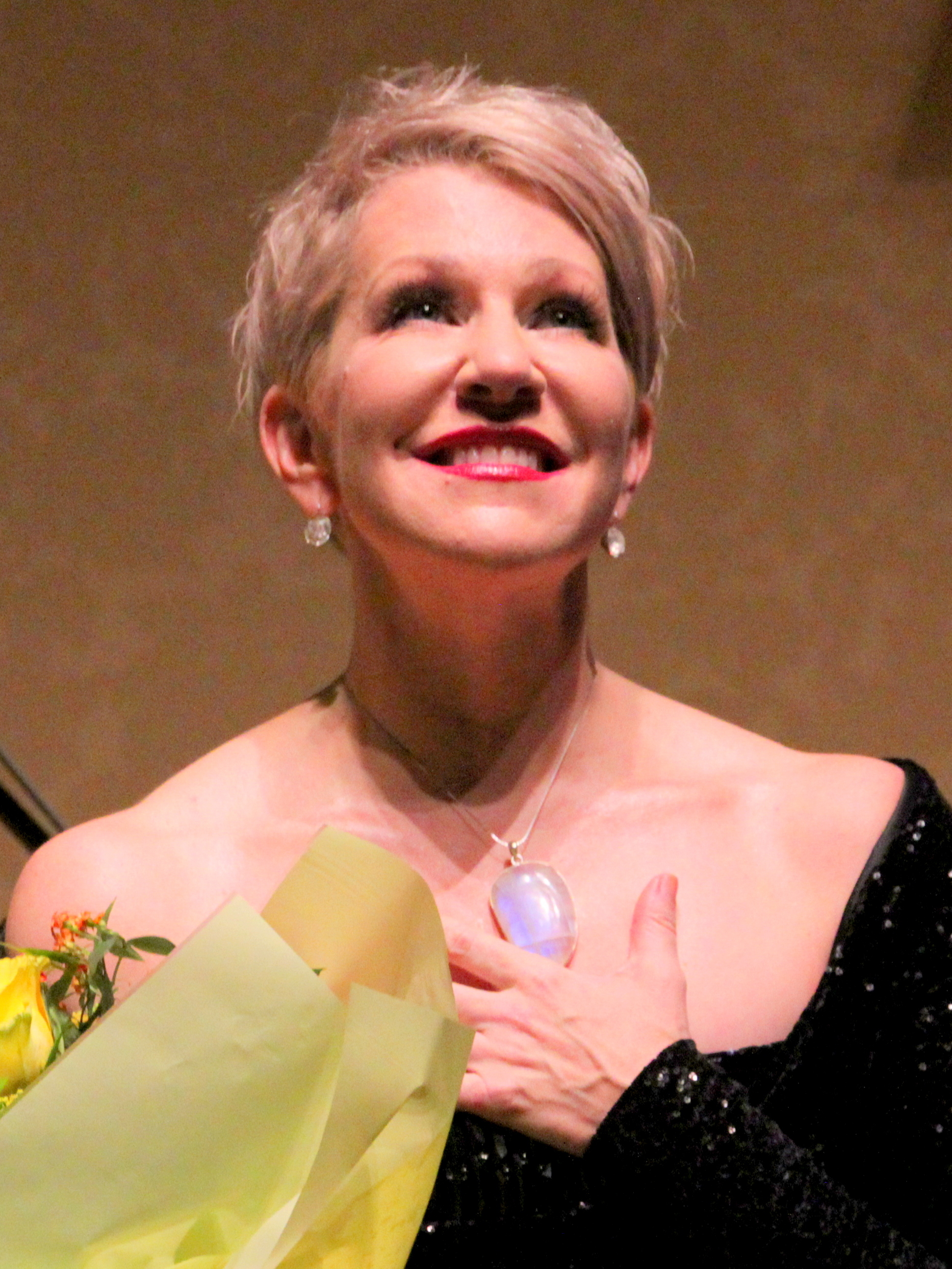
Joyce DiDonato

Grace Bumbry, born 1937, became the first Black Venus in Tannhäuser at the Bayreuth Festival. Jessye Norman, born 1945, was known for her immense, dark-hued voice and unparalleled versatility. She was a major figure on the global stage for decades and a passionate advocate for the recognition of African American musical heritage. Renée Fleming is known for her elegance and the lightness of her cantilenas. Joyce DiDonato impresses the public with dramatic intensity and vocal agility in Baroque and Romantic works. Other standouts include Eileen Farrell, who often sang with Leonard Bernstein, Cathy Berberian, a versatile mezzo-soprano, as well as the coloratura sopranos Roberta Peters and Reri Grist. Also the Swedish-born sopranos Olive Fremstad and Astrid Varnay can be considered Americans, as the grew up in the United States and obtained the US citizenship; both had brilliant careers in Europe and at the Met.

There were also a number of male colleagues from the USA who became opera stars in the 20th century – for example, the tenor Richard Tucker, the baritones Leonard Warren, Robert Merrill, Sherrill Milnes, and Thomas Hampson, the bass-baritones George London and Simon Estes, and the bass Samuel Ramey.

=== New and larger opera houses ===
In the second half of the 20th century, some gigantic opera houses were built in the USA. Their monumental style was intended to underscore the importance of these "temples of art." In 1966, the largest opera house of the world, the Metropolitan Opera in New York (with 3.800 seats and 175 standees) was inaugurated. Despite its enormous size, the acoustics are phenomenal. The main curtain, made of silk damask, is the largest in the world. The New Met is situated at the Lincoln Center on Broadway, Upper West Side.

A massive, multi-million-dollar campaign was launched by artists, preservationists, and politicians (including the Mayor of New York and the Governor), its title was "Save the Met", meaning the Old Met at 39th Street and Broadway. They tried to get the building designated as a historic landmark, but failed. The Old Met was demolished in 1967.

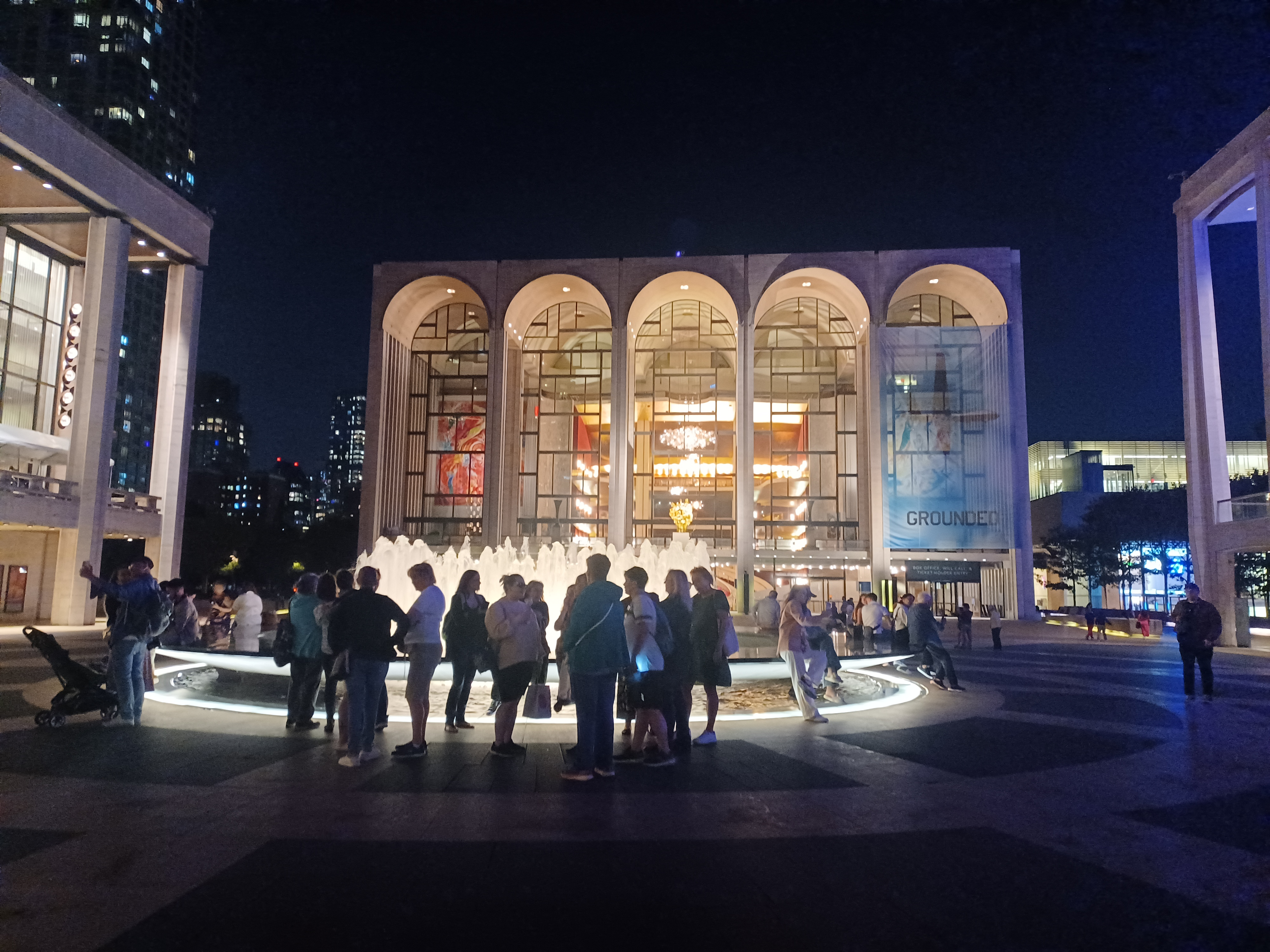
Lincoln Center

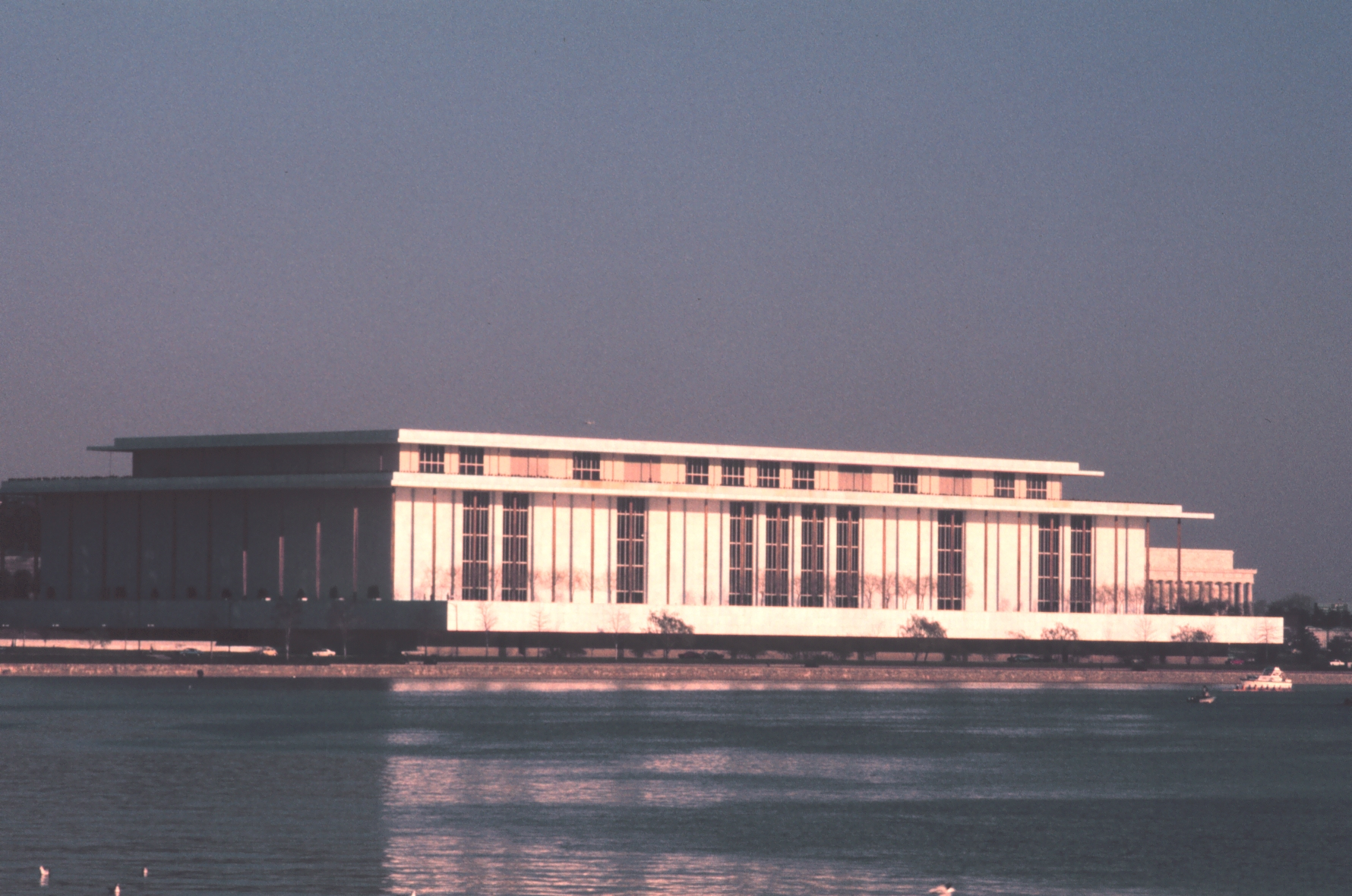
Kennedy Center

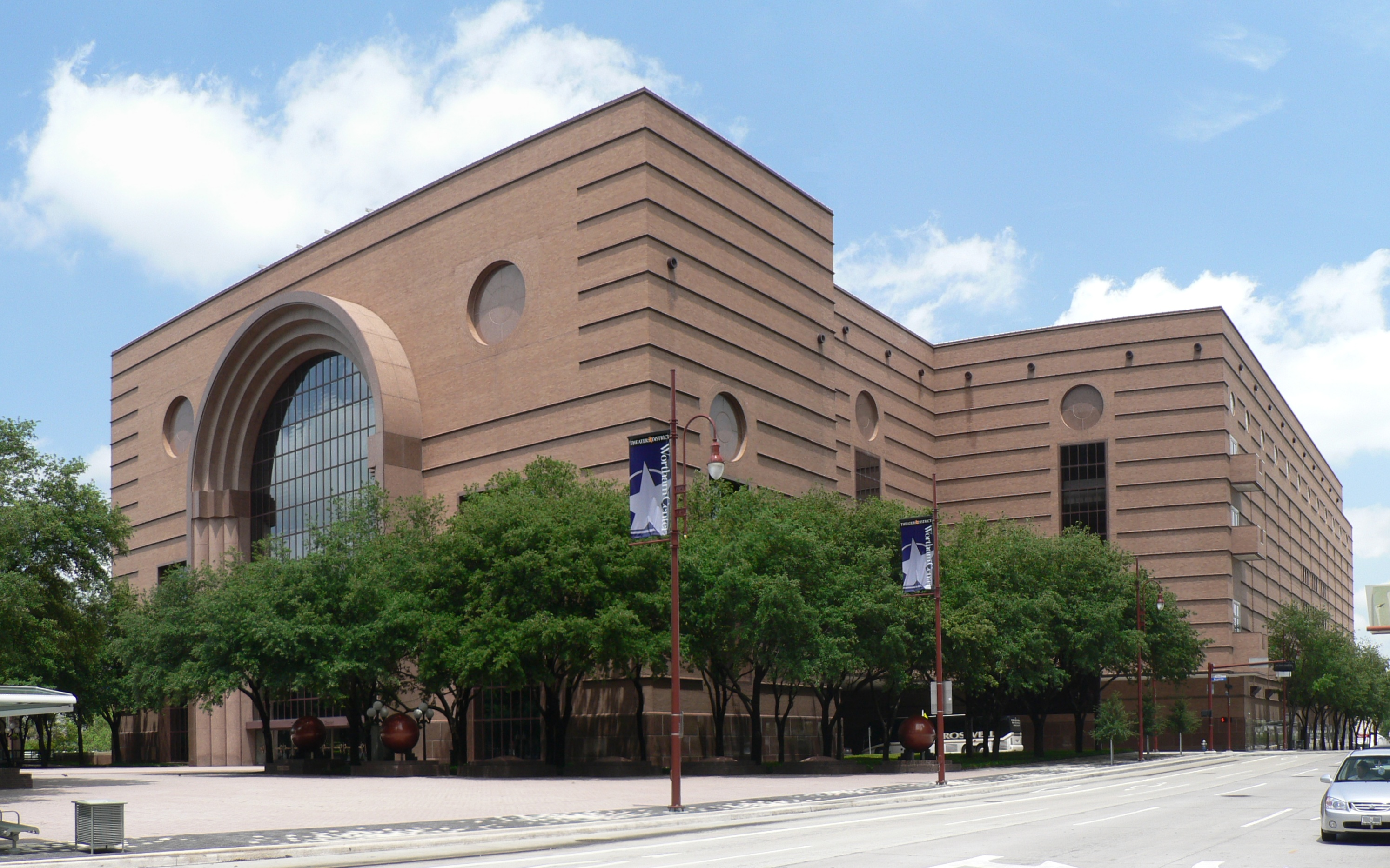
Wortham Theater Center

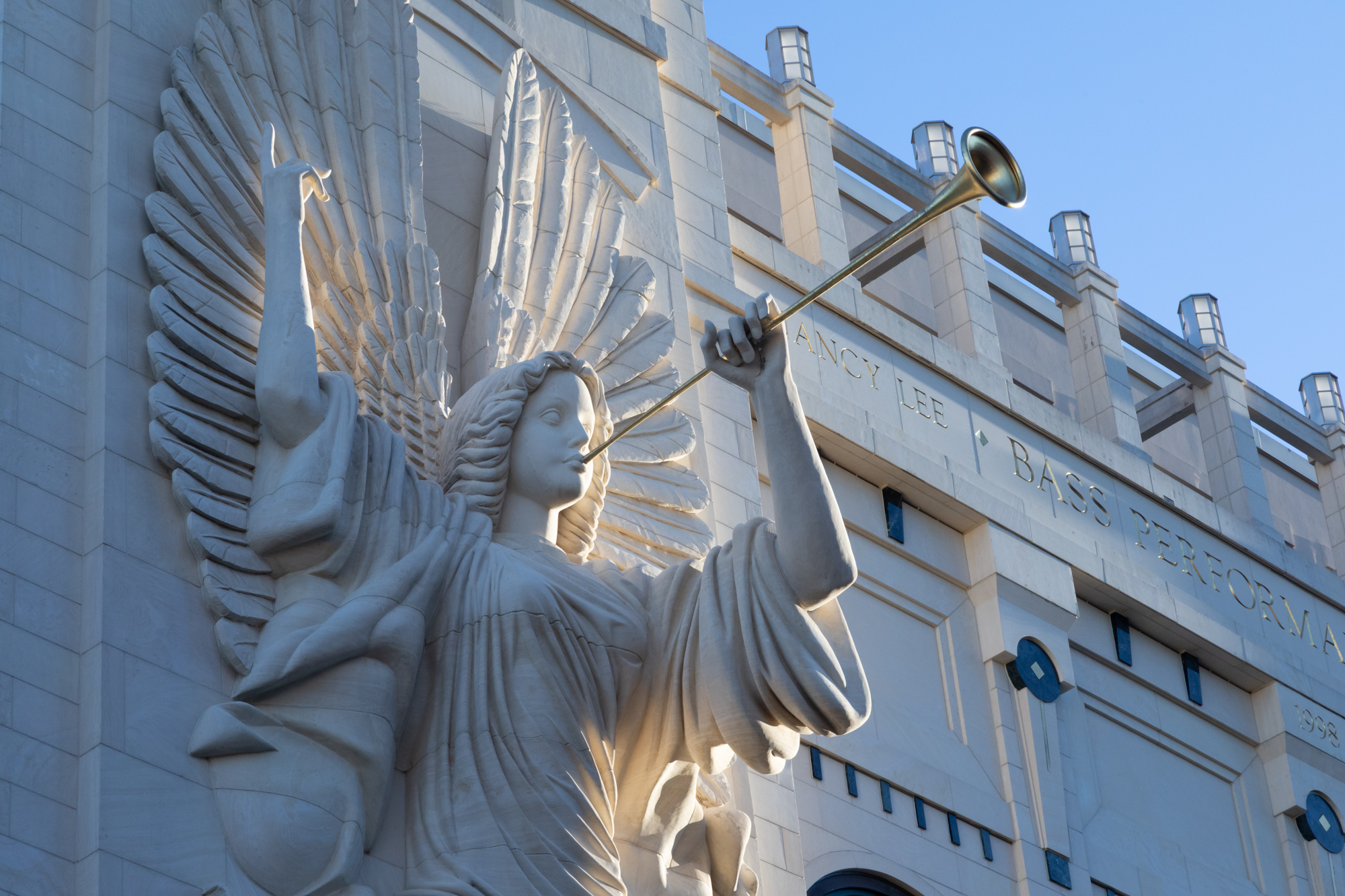
Bass Performance Hall

The Kennedy Center in Washington, D.C. was inaugurated in 1971. Its largest hall seats 2,465, it was the residence of the Washington National Opera until beginning of 2026, after the Trump takeover of the Kennedy Center. Home of the Houston Grand Opera is the Wortham Center for the Performing Arts, which opened in 1987. Its Alice and George Brown Theater has exactly 2,405 seats. Despite its size, the furthest seat from the stage is only 138 feet away, keeping the performances feeling relatively intimate. The Bass Performance Hall was completed in 1998, it seats 2,056 persons. Since its completion it is the home of the Fort Worth Opera.

=== Leonard Bernstein ===
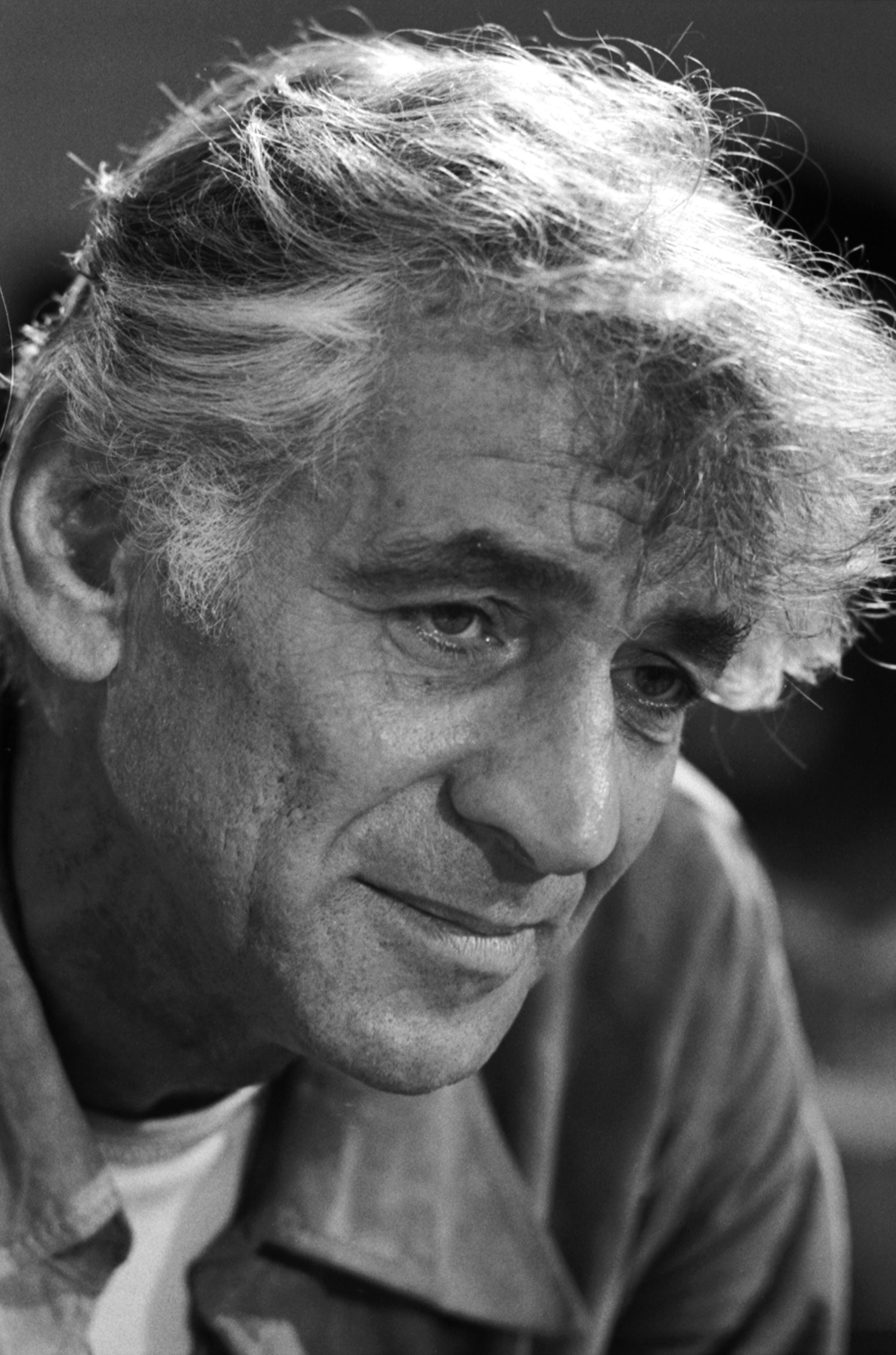
Leonard Bernstein, 1971

One of the most influential figures in opera in the United States was the pianist, conductor, and composer Leonard Bernstein (1918–1990), although none of his stage works has ever been produced by the Met, either during his lifetime or since his death. A son of Jewish immigrants from Ukraine, he was born in Massachusetts. He began giving piano lessons at an early age, overcoming his father's opposition to a musical career. He studied music at Harvard University and quickly became known for his ability to communicate and share his enthusiasm about music. Much of his career took him outside the traditional paths of American opera. In 1953, he debuted at La Scala with Cherubini's Médée, starring Maria Callas, followed by Bellini's La sonnambula two years later. He was the first American music director of the New York Philharmonic (1958–1969). He was very much appreciated by the Viennese public — both at the Musikverein with the Vienna Philharmonic and at the State Opera, where he debuted in 1966 with Falstaff and where he last conducted his own opera A Quiet Place in 1986. Other conducting engagements at the State Opera included a celebrated Fidelio production, Der Rosenkavalier, his own Mass, Beethoven's Ninth and Mahler's Second. At the Met, however, he only conducted three operas: Falstaff (1964), Cavalleria rusticana (1970) and Carmen (1972), starring Marilyn Horne and James McCracken.

His musicals On the Town (1944), Wonderful Town (1953), Candide (1956, revised in 1974), and West Side Story (1957) premiered on Broadway. Especially West Side Story became a smashing hit worldwide. The two operas Trouble in Tahiti (1952) and A Quiet Place (1984) center on Sam and Dinah, a seemingly successful married couple whose relationship has become distant. A Quiet Place was shown in Houston and Washington, in Milan and Vienna, in 2010 also at the New York City Opera, never though at the Met.

Most important for opera in the USA were his television appearances, in which he explained operas nationwide and gave free rein to his enthusiasm, for example the 1958 episode What Makes Opera Grand? at Omnibus.

=== American composers and global recognition ===
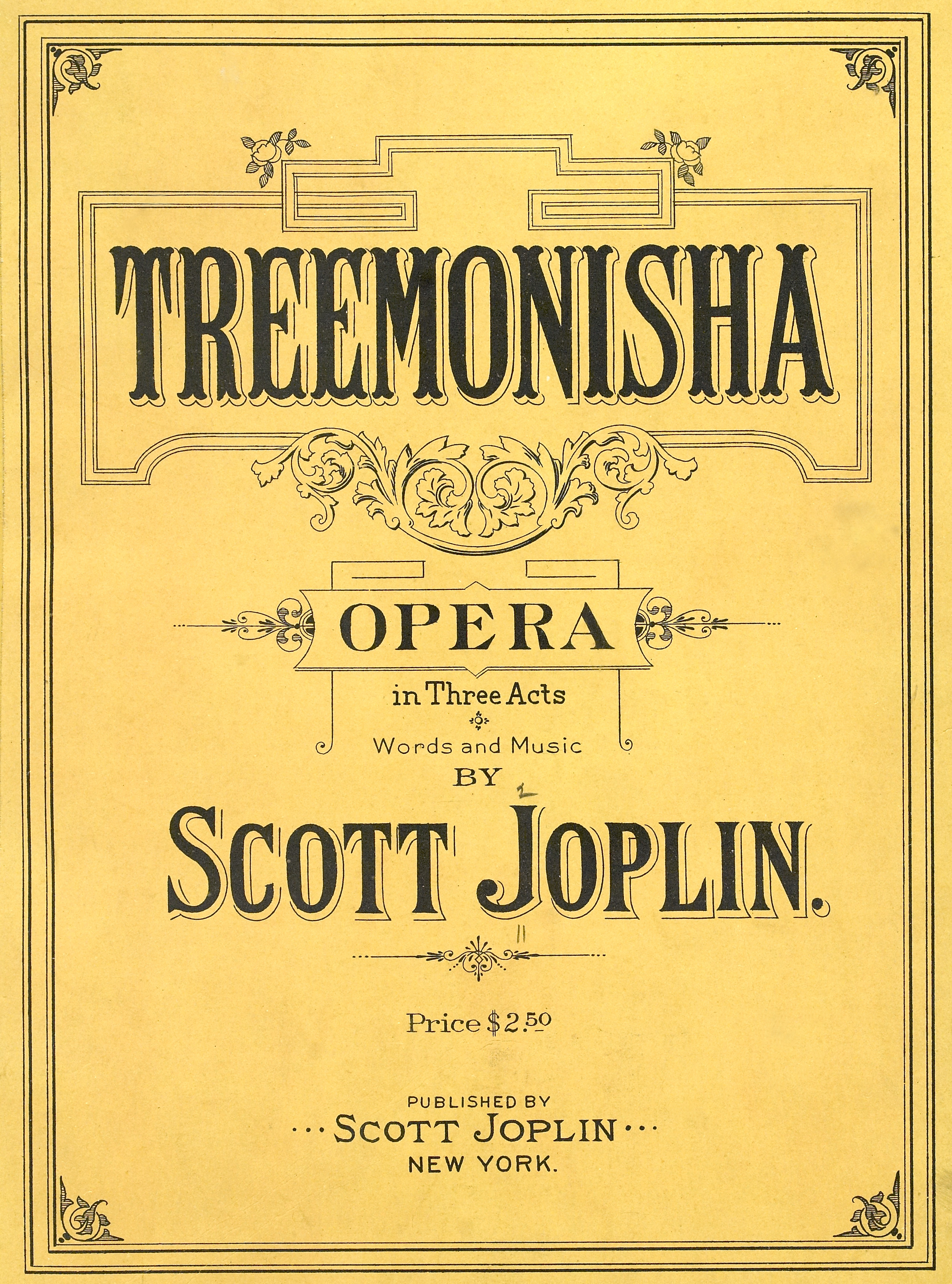
Cover, 1911

On January 27, 1972, the world premiere of Treemonisha by Scott Joplin took place in Atlanta, using the orchestration by T. J. Anderson. Treemonisha is a young freedwoman. After being taught to read by a white woman, she leads her community against the influence of conjurers, who are shown as preying on ignorance and superstition. Treemonisha is abducted and is about to be thrown into a wasps' nest when her friend Remus rescues her. The work had been completed in 1911 and although the composer's widow tried hard, she did not succeed in getting the opera performed. Only 19 years after her death, Treemonisha was brought to the stage. It was an immediate success, several productions in the States and abroad followed.

In the second half of the 20th-century, the number of American opera companies continued to grow, but operas written by American composers and librettists were often overlooked, receiving fewer performances and premieres. In the mid-1980s, a collaboration between Opera America, the National Endowment for the Arts, and the Rockefeller Foundation began, in hopes of reinvigorating the opera scene, particularly encouraging the creation and performance of American-written operas. The collaboration was seen as a success, particularly because of its outreach to a younger audience; additionally, technology now made it even easier to provide subtitles at performances, allowing for better comprehension of performances.

=== End of the Met National Tours ===
The last Met National Tour took place from May 5 to May 31, 1986. It visited only four cities – Boston, Cleveland, Atlanta, and Minneapolis. Among the participating artists were Grace Bumbry, Cornell MacNeil and James McCracken; among the operas performed were such hits as Aida, Carmen, La traviata and Tosca. The decision to cease the tours was taken by General Manager Bruce Crawford because they were losing roughly $1 million per week. After the final performance in Minneapolis the sets and props and costumes per packed into the famous Opera Train who headed back to New York.

=== Opera in the movies ===
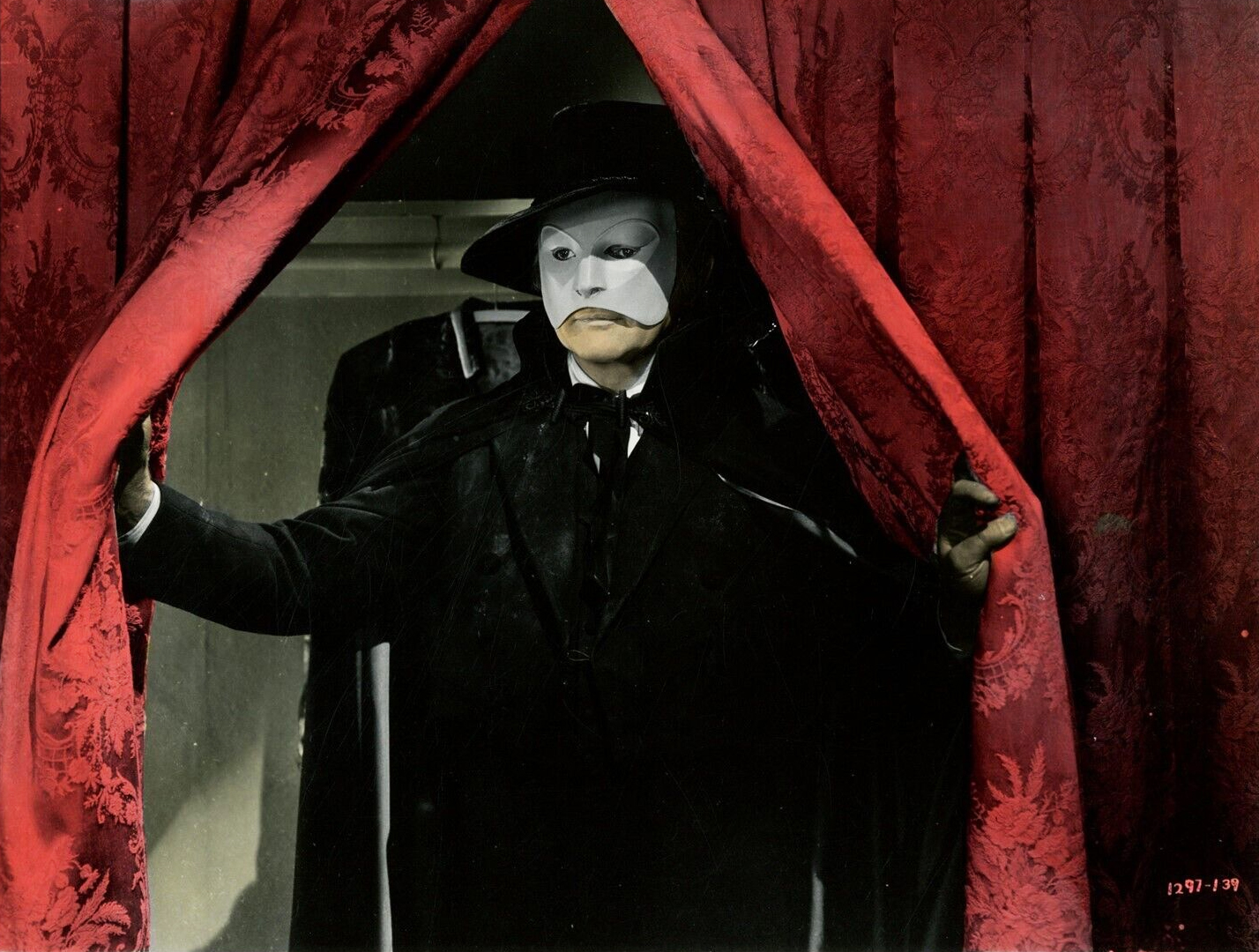
Claude Rains in Phantom of the Opera, 1943

Throughout cinema history, there have been very different approaches to integrating operas or arias into films:

- Citizen Kane (1941) is an epic by Orson Welles about a millionaire constructing an opera house for his wife. Welles directed the film and played the title role. He had a completely fictional opera written to structurally mimic a real 19th-century grand production. His desperation to manufacture a talent leads to the screeching, terrified performance of his wife, portrayed by Dorothy Comingore, a tragic public humiliation driven entirely by the rich man's ego.
- Carmen Jones (1954) is a direct, localized translation of the complete opera score of Bizet's Carmen. Director Otto Preminger adapted the story into a landmark African-American musical set during World War II, starring Dorothy Dandridge and Harry Belafonte. The entire structure of Bizet's drama is preserved, tracking a tragic romance at a military parachute factory.
- The Untouchables (1987) is famous for Brian De Palma intercutting the simultaneous scenes of the brutal murder of Al Capone's rival on the streets with mob boss Robert De Niro weeping tears while listening to "Vesti la giubba", the aria of the heartbroken clown from Leoncavallo's Pagliacci.
- Pretty Woman (1990) showcases Julia Roberts stunned by her first opera, La traviata, at the San Francisco Opera House, invited by gentlemanly Richard Gere with champagne and a private jet.
- The Age of Innocence (1993) presents an opera house as a fishbowl where the upper class watches, judges, and gossips about one another. Martin Scorsese uses Gounod's opera Faust to establish the rigid, suffocating social codes of New York in the 1870s. The characters barely look on the stage.
- The Shawshank Redemption (1994) shows Andy Dufresne lock himself in the warden's office and play "Canzonetta sull'aria" from Mozart's The Marriage of Figaro over the prison public address system. It has been called one of cinema's most transcendent moments.
- The James Bond movie Quantum of Solace (2008), mostly a British production, features highly-regarded sequences in modern action cinema, and a giant eye from the Bregenz Festival's production of Tosca. In the US, 23,5 million tickets were sold for this movie.

=== Next generation of American composers ===
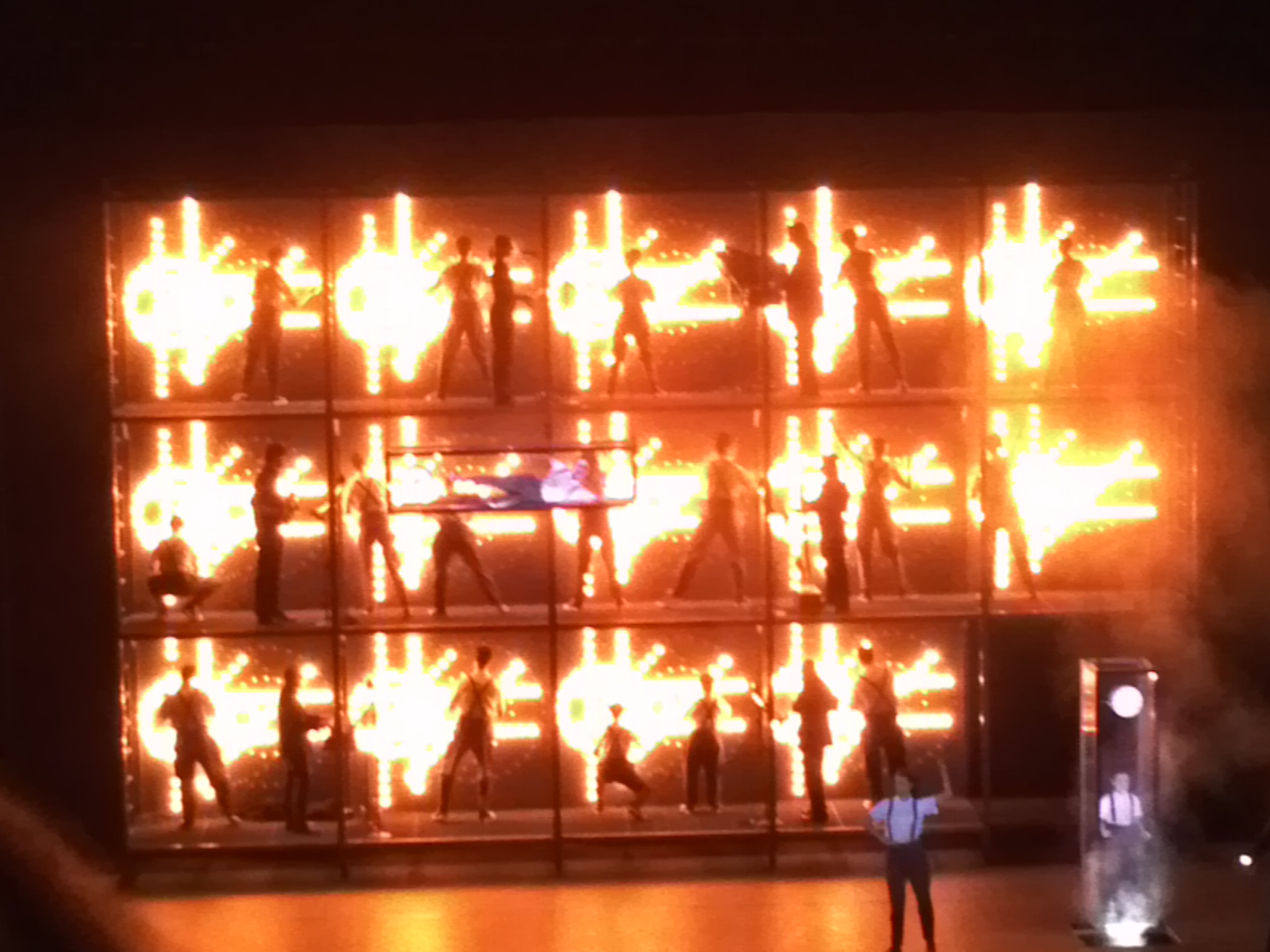
Einstein on the Beach, 2012

Nixon in China, 2024

Four American composers gained recognition worldwide in the 1980s, the 1990s and at the beginning of the new century:

- Philip Glass (born 1937) is widely regarded as the most important representative of Minimal music. He achieved instant fame with Einstein on the Beach (1976), a collaboration with director and set designer Robert Wilson, who was especially celebrated in Europe. Satyagraha (1980), Akhnaten (1983), The Voyage (1992), and The Perfect American (2013) followed. He also wrote the scores for Broadway productions such as the revivals of The Elephant Man (2002), The Crucible (2016), and King Lear (2019). For the latter he won the Drama Desk Award for Outstanding Music in a Play.
- John Adams (born 1947) is considered a post-minimalist composer. His early fame rested on the immediate success of a documentary-style opera called Nixon in China (1987), the first of the so-called CNN operas, followed by the scandal-ridden Death of Klinghoffer (1991) and Doctor Atomic (2005), a piece about J. Robert Oppenheimer in Los Alamos. Especially Nixon in China has been performed all over Europe and is still on the roster of many opera houses after forty years.
- Anthony Davis (born 1951) has been called "the dean of African-American opera composers." He became known for his highly political plots, for whose composition he integrates jazz, rhythm and blues, gospel, non-Western, African, European classical, Indonesian gamelan, and experimental music. His better known works are X, The Life and Times of Malcolm X (New York City Opera 1986), Amistad (Chicago 1997), Wakonda's Dream (Omaha 2007), and The Central Park Five (Long Beach CA 2019). The latter won him a Pulitzer Prize for Music in 2020.
- Jake Heggie (born 1961) describes himself as a theatre composer who is concerned with "serving [the] drama" and "exploring character." His first opera made a long lasting impression – Dead Man Walking, commissioned by San Francisco Opera, first performed at the War Memorial Opera House on October 7, 2000, and immediately acclaimed by public and press. Dead Man Walking is the first and only opera situated in a condemned row of a High security prison, it ends with the execution of Joseph De Rocher, a convicted murderer. Thereafter Sister Helen, who had accompanied him during his time on death row and who wrote the book, stands over his body and sings her hymn one last time. This opera secured its place on the roster of major opera houses. Heggie struggled to replicate the success of his debut, five less successful operas followed. But with Moby Dick (2010), he achieved a second major success.

The works of these composers demonstrate that the choice of themes in the USA is far more tangible and grounded in reality than current European opera productions. A significant discrepancy is also evident in the musical style: while Europe still somehow adheres to the twelve-tone technique, American composers do not shy away from accusations of prioritizing popularity and audibility. Evan Johnson writes: "An 'American Composer', by contrast, operates – or can be successfully interpreted as operating – without the same sense of obligation to history [as his European counterpart]; his or her concern is the present, the tightly bounded experience of a particular work by a particular audience as created by a particular composer with particular interests."

=== First trend toward literary operas ===
In Europe, at the turn between the 19th and 20th centuries, the genre of literary opera was created – with Pelléas and Mélisande, Salome, and subsequently The Cunning Little Vixen and Wozzeck as first examples – based on works by Maeterlinck, Oscar Wilde, Těsnohlídek, and Büchner. This trend arrived in the United States much later and reached a peak at the end of the century:

- Regina, the 1939 play The Little Foxes by Lilian Hellman, set in music in 1949 by Marc Blitzstein,
- Of Mice and Men, the 1937 novella by John Steinbeck, set in music in 1970 by Carlisle Floyd,
- A Streetcar Named Desire, the 1947 play by Tennessee Williams, set in music in 1998 by André Previn,
- Little Women, the 1869 novel by Louisa May Alcott, set in music in 1998 by Mark Adamo,
- The Handmaid's Tale, the 1985 novel by Margaret Atwood, set in music in 1998 by Danish Poul Ruders, and
- The Great Gatsby, the 1925 novel by F. Scott Fitzgerald, set in music in 1999 by John Harbison

In all these cases, the strength of the plot (and the prominence of the author) ensured that an audience far removed from modernity could be intrigued. Of course, due to the powerful imagery of the film adaptations – as with The Great Gatsby or later The Shining – there was often a risk that the operatic reality might not live up to expectations, thus inevitably leading to disappointment.

=== Robert Wilson ===
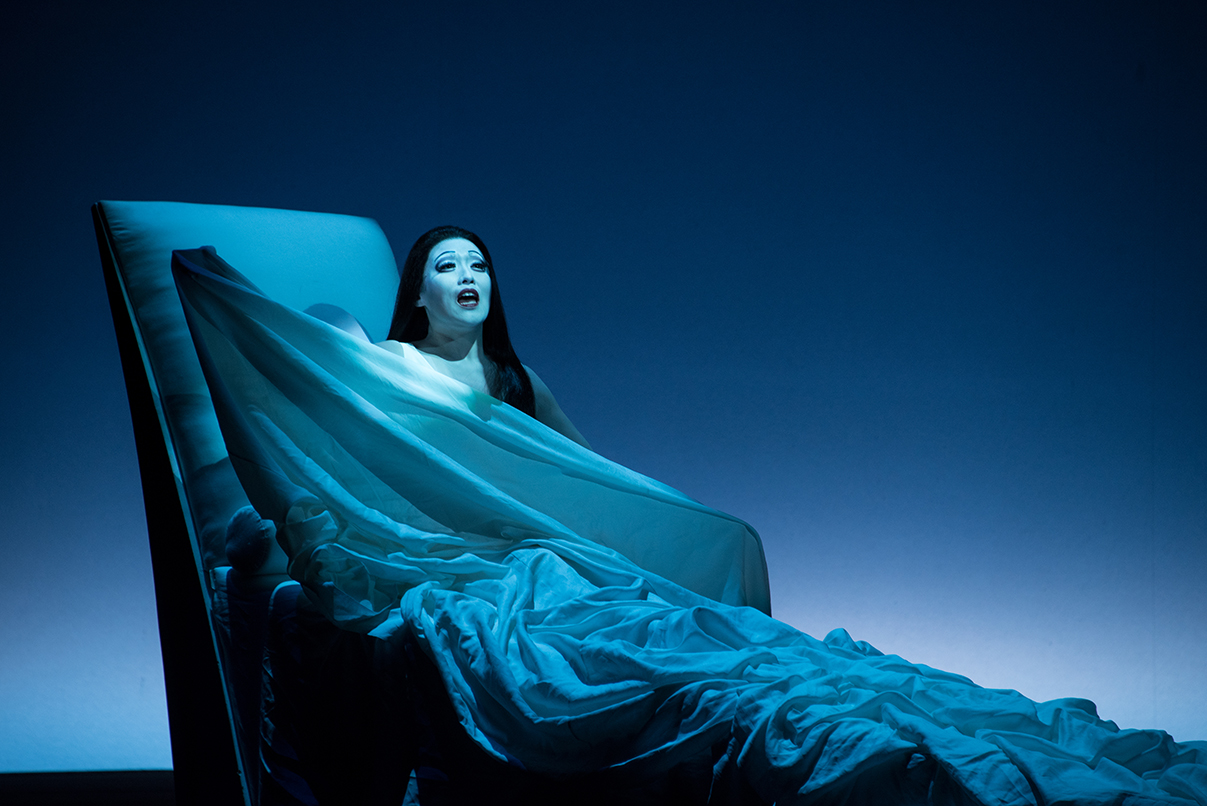
La traviata, Linz, Austria 2015

Robert Wilson (1941-2025) was a Texas-born artist, director and stage designer particularly famous in Europe for his works of experimental theatre. His first step to fame was Einstein on the Beach, a 1976 collaboration with composer Philip Glass that premiered in Avignon, France. Thereafter he directed plays and operas all over Europe, from works by Claudio Monteverdi (Paris 2014 and La Scala, Milan 2015) to The Jungle Book in an operatic version by CocoRosie (Luxembourg 2019). His interpretations, lauded globally as emotional and aesthetic, were performed at the Salzburg Festival, La Scala in Milan, the Paris Opera, Madrid's Teatro Real, the Berlin State Opera and many other opera houses.

=== Queer themes ===
In the 1990s, two major operas with queer representation broke the rule of the unspeakable:

- Stewart Wallace's Harvey Milk (1995), an adaptation of the life of famed San Francisco Supervisor, and
- Paula M. Kimper's Patience and Sarah (1998), which showcased opera's first lesbian relationship.

Both operas achieved mainstream success. Once the barrier was broken, also a successful Broadway play – Angels in America by Tony Kushner – and a Hollywood blockbuster – Brokeback Mountain by Ang Lee – could be converted into operas, the first one by Hungarian composer Péter Eötvös (Paris 2004), the latter by American Charles Wuorinen (Madrid 2014). Terence Blanchard's queer-themed operas Champion (2013) and Fire Shut Up in My Bones (2019), based on the memoir of journalist Charles M. Blow, both premiered in St. Louis. Both became major hits at traditional American opera houses like the Met. In 2016, Gregory Spears presented his opera Fellow Travelers, following a romance between two men working in the U.S. government, set in the 1950s; it premiered at the Cincinnati Opera. American-Canadian singer-songwriter Rufus Wainwright created Hadrian, exploring the epic, historical love between the Roman Emperor Hadrian and Antinous; this opera premiered in Toronto in 2018.

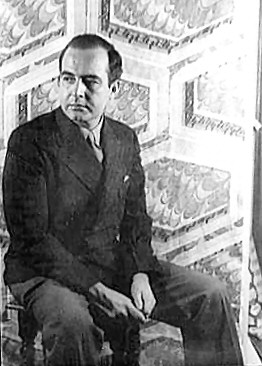
Samuel Barber

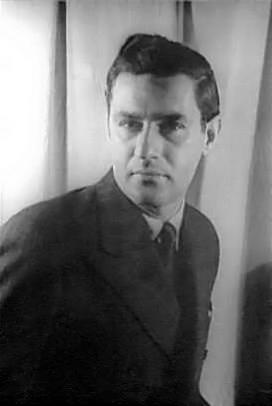
Gian Carlo Menotti

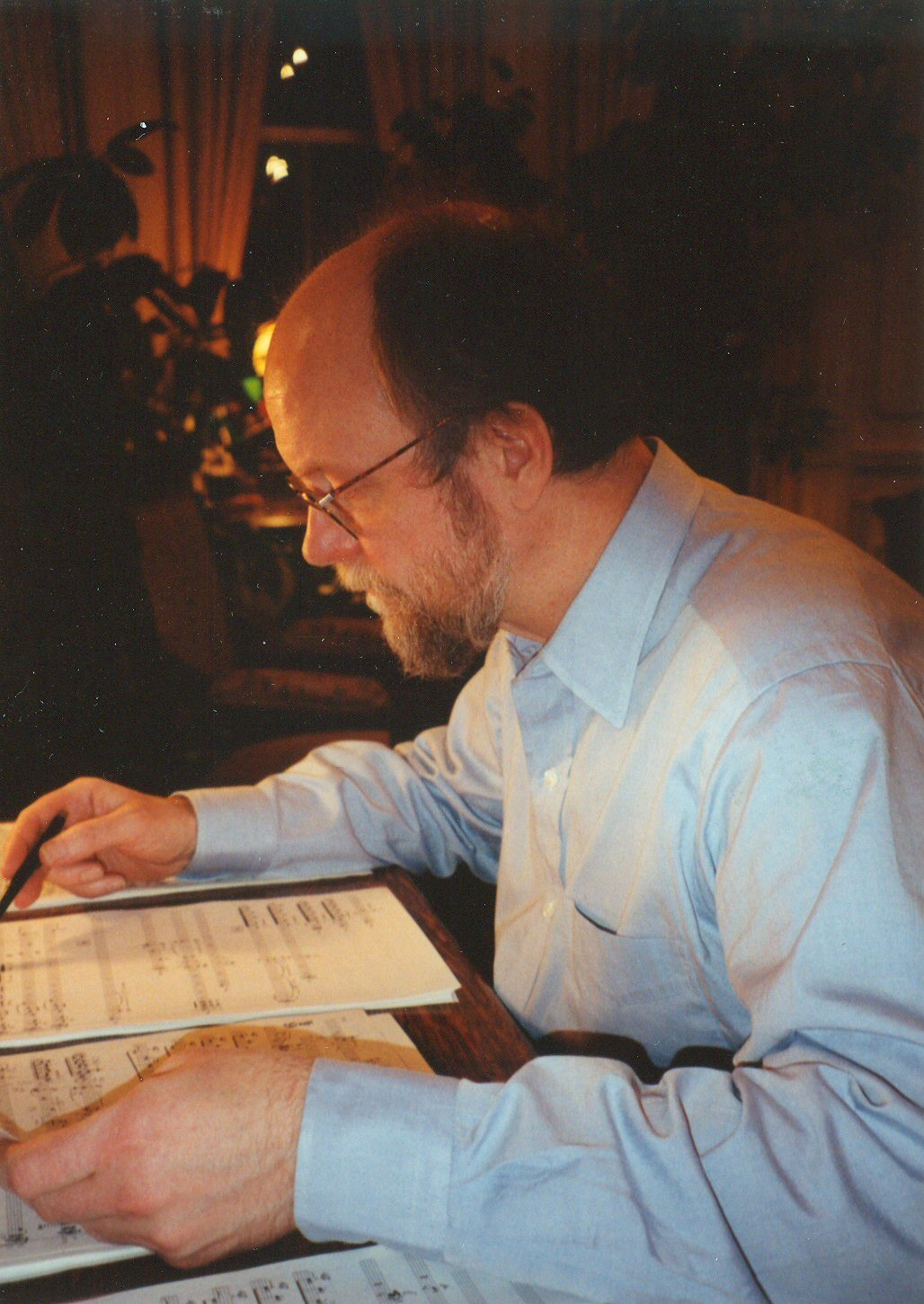
Charles Wuorinen

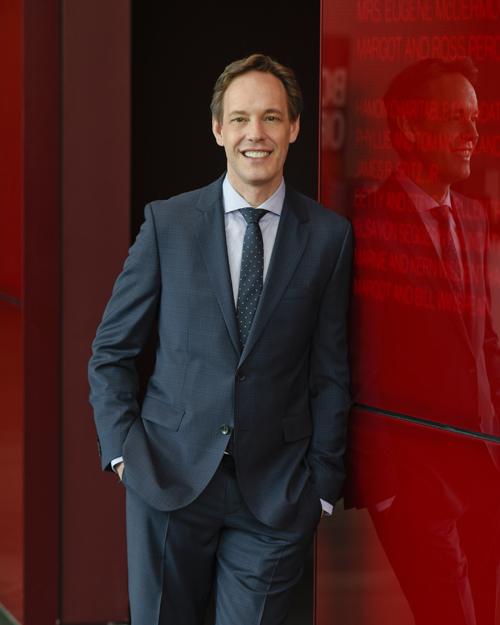
Jake Heggie

Several contemporary composers were, or are, openly gay — Corigliano, Gordon, Heggie, Puts, Spears, Wuorinen. Two composers of the past, Barber and Menotti, were living in a long-term relationship; Leonard Bernstein and conductor Thomas Schippers were bisexual, Aaron Copland, Lou Harrison, Cole Porter, Ned Rorem, Stephen Sondheim, and Virgil Thomson were considered gay. Today, there aren't many openly LGBTQ singers in the USA — they include Jamie Barton, Lucas Bouk, Michael Fabiano, John Holiday, Holden Madagame, Brian Mulligan, Breanna Sinclairé, Paulo Szot, Russell Thomas, Davóne Tines, and the married couple Beth Clayton and Patricia Racette.

Two music directors of the Met were, or are, gay: James Levine, who held the position from 1976 to 2017, avoided coming out throughout his life. He was dismissed following allegations of sexual harassment and died in 2021. His successor, Yannick Nézet-Séguin, is openly gay. He is married to the violist and chorus master Pierre Tourville..

== 21st century ==
The American opera scene has witnessed a surge in diversity during the 21st century, as various companies have embraced a broad spectrum of repertoire. In the first decades of the 21st century, women pushed their way into leadership positions in opera – first as conductors and directors, then also as composers and artistic directors. The trend to use monumental literary masterpieces for the operatic stage continued – with opera versions of novels by Herman Melville, or John Steinbeck, or a play by Noël Coward, even films like Breaking the Waves by Lars von Trier. Finally, some of the most important opera houses faced crises in the 2020s – for example, the Metropolitan Opera in New York due to financial difficulties, and the Washington National Opera due to the political restructuring of the Kennedy Center.

=== Opera education, Met Radio and Met Live in HD ===
The U.S. has become a hub for opera education, with institutions such as the Juilliard School and the Curtis Institute of Music fostering the training of aspiring opera professionals. The Metropolitan Opera's Lindemann Young Artist Development Program continues to nurture emerging talent. Opera's influence on American culture persists as it tackles modern-day concerns through inventive performances and partnerships. Composers such as Miguel del Águila have written numerous operas, among them Time and Again Barela, commissioned by the city of Albuquerque for its tricentennial celebration.

Founded in 2006

In 2006, the Metropolitan Opera Radio was founded, it can be heard in 40 countries. In the same year the Metropolitan Opera Live in HD series began regularly broadcasting live, high-definition Saturday matinee performances via satellite to movie theaters across the United States and worldwide. This modern iteration functions exactly like the "regular TV transmissions" of the past, using multi-camera arrays and live intermission interviews, but delivers the experience to a collective theater audience.

=== Literary masterworks set in music ===
Once again literary masterworks were used as librettos for a series of contemporary operas:

- Haroun and the Sea of Stories, based on the children's novel of the same name by Salman Rushdie, set to music in 2004 by Charles Wuorinen,
- Brief Encounter, based on Noël Coward's play Still Life, set to music in 2007 by André Previn,
- The Grapes of Wrath, the 1939 novel by John Steinbeck, set to music in 2007 by Ricky Ian Gordon,
- Moby-Dick, the 1851 novel by Herman Melville, set to music in 2010 by Jake Heggie,
- Cold Mountain, the 1997 novel by Charles Frazier, set to music in 2015 by Jennifer Higdon,
- Bel Canto, the 2001 novel by Ann Patchett, set to music in 2015 by Peruvian composer Jimmy López,
- The Shining, the 1977 novel by Stephen King, set to music in 2016 by Paul Moravec, and
- The Hours, the 1998 novel by Michael Cunningham, set to music in 2022 by Kevin Puts.

Also Dead Man Walking (2000) by Jake Heggie, Fellow Travelers (2016) by Gregory Spears, Proving Up (2018) by Missy Mazzoli and Fire Shut Up in My Bones (2019) by Terence Blanchard fall into this category.

=== Female composers, female point of view ===
Until 2016, the Metropolitan Opera had only ever staged one opera by a woman: Ethel Smyth's Der Wald in 1903. This 113-year streak was finally broken by L'Amour de loin, an already successful opera by Finnish composer Kaija Saariaho from 2000 – paving the way for the current surge of American women's works on that stage, such as Jeanine Tesori, Gabriela Lena Frank and Missy Mazzoli.

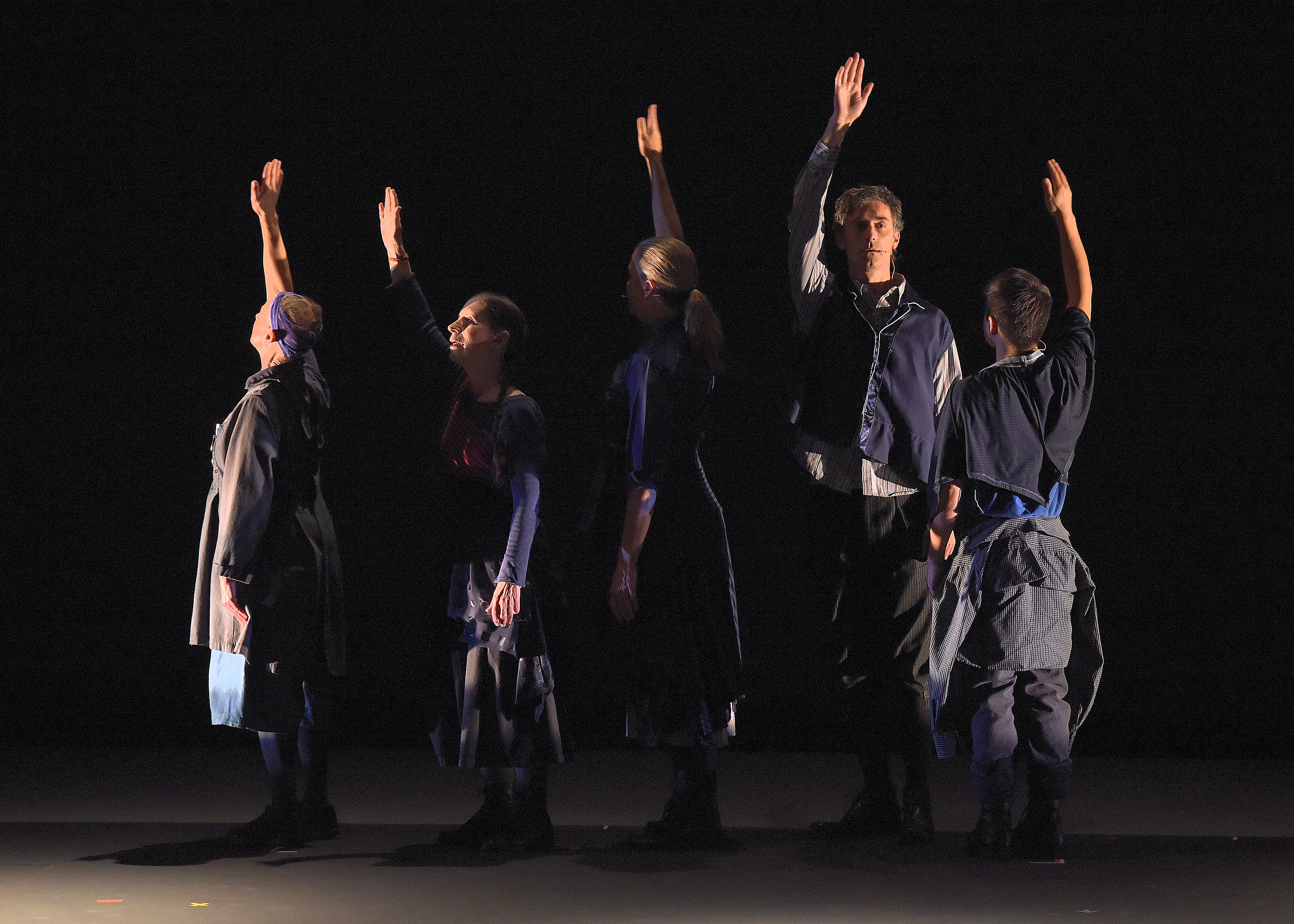
On Behalf of Nature by Meridith Monk, Brooklyn Academy of Music 2014

Suddenly and unexpectedly, around 2015, a brigade of female composers emerged in North America, making a name for themselves with new operatic works such as adaptations of successful films or explorations of social justice themes. Three colleagues had helped pave the way:

- Composer Thea Musgrave (born 1928), originally from Scotland, created among others Mary, Queen of Scots and Simón Bolívar, the latter first shown in 1995 in Norfolk, Virginia.
- Meredith Monk (born 1942) creates total works of art that blends music, dance, film, and theater into a single, immersive experience. She often refers to her stage works as "Musik-Theater" or "Opera Epics", as they break almost every rule of the classical genre. Her most formal opera, Atlas, commissioned by Houston Grand Opera and for the first time performed in 1991, follows the journey of a young woman seeking spiritual enlightenment across the globe.
- Libby Larsen (born 1950) is still one of America's most prolific and most performed living composers. Her catalogue of compositions contains more than 500 works, she has worked for every genre of classical music, including 15 operas/chamber operas. In 1990, her opera Frankenstein: The Modern Prometheus premiered at the Minnesota Opera.

The newcomers of the new millennium are:

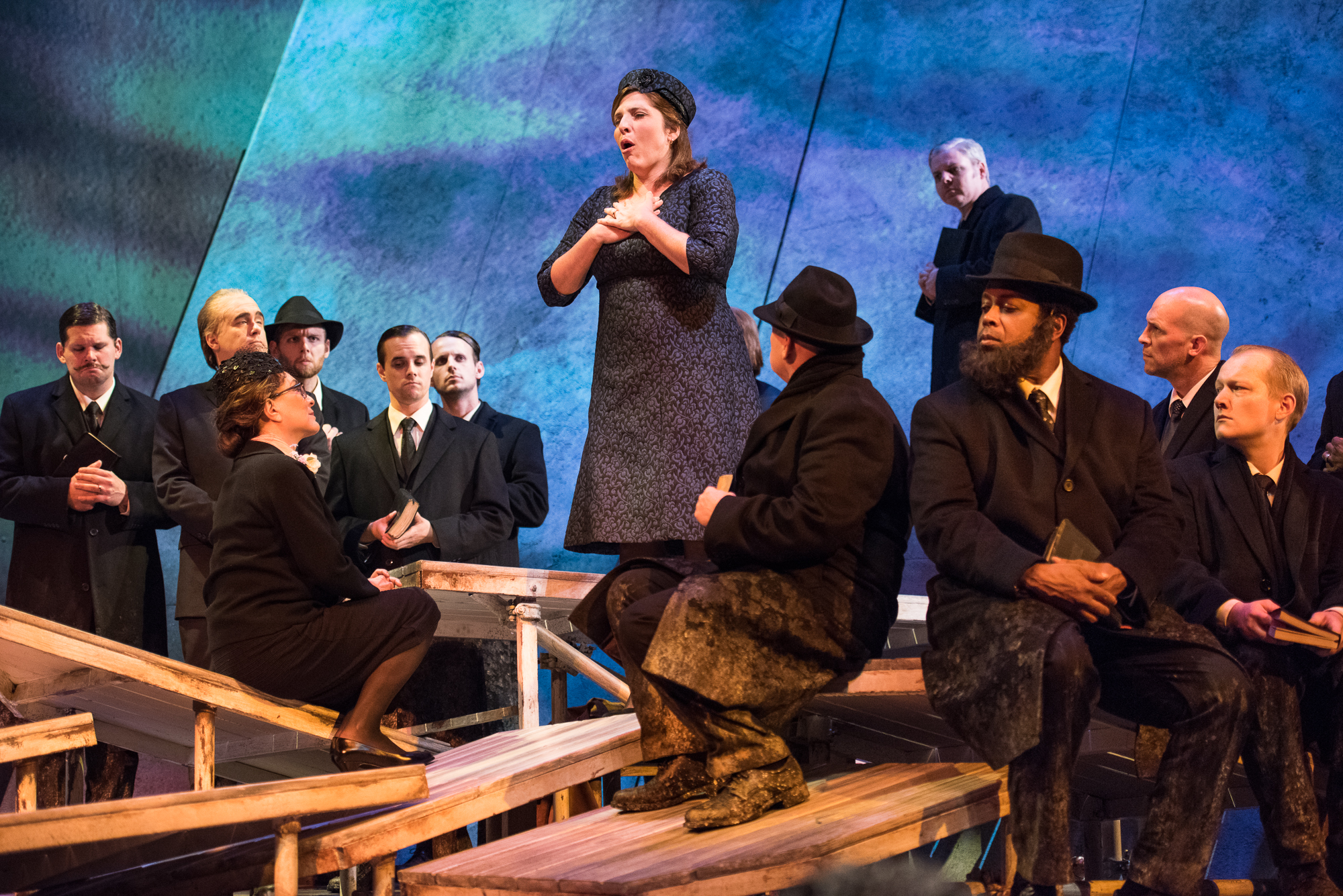
Breaking the Waves, Opera Philadelphia 2016

- Missy Mazzoli (born 1980) became known for dark, visceral soundscapes. She succeeded in 2016 with Breaking the Waves for Opera Philadelphia, an adaptation of the legendary film by Lars von Trier, and in 2018 with Proving Up for Washington National Opera, Opera Omaha and Miller Theatre at Columbia University, based on a short story by Karen Russell. Her fourth opera, The Listeners, premiered in 2022 at the Oslo Opera House, can be considered a modern gothic opera. Due to her rapid career advancement, Washington Classical Review called Missy Mazzoli "a rock star of the classical world".
- Ellen Reid (born 1966) won the 2019 Pulitzer Prize for Music for her opera Prism, which explores the psychological effects of trauma.
- Jeanine Tesori (born 1961) created Blue (2019), focusing on police violence, and Grounded (2023), exploring the psychological toll of remote drone warfare. Blue premiered at the Glimmerglass Festival and has been performed at major opera houses, i.e. Chicago and Washington. It won Best New Opera, awarded by the Music Critics Association of North America. Grounded was commissioned by the Met.
- Du Yun (born 1977) often blends operatic tradition with punk and experimental sound. Her opera Angel's Bone is a harrowing allegory for the modern-day exploitation of vulnerable individuals, using angels to address human trafficking in today's world. The libretto was written by Royce Vavrek. The opera won 2017 Pulitzer Prize.
- Gabriela Lena Frank (born 1972) frequently integrates her Peruvian-Chinese-Jewish heritage into her operatic work. In 2022, she presented El último sueño de Frida y Diego, a work co-commissioned by San Diego Opera, San Francisco Opera, Fort Worth Opera, and the DePauw University School of Music. It is considered one of the most successful "Bio-Operas" of the 21st century, i.e.operas based on historical figures. When the opera was presented at the Met in 2023, it was their first ever production in Spanish language. The opera was shown also at the Lyric Opera of Chicago (in March 2026).
- Laura Kaminsky (born 1956) is mainly known for As One, but she also composed Time to Act, commissioned by Pittsburgh Opera, Opera Montana and Boston Conservatory at Berklee, with additional funding by Opera Santa Barbara. The opera tackles the issue of school violence.

With The Handmaid's Tale, composed by Danish Poul Ruders, the feminist scenario of Margaret Atwood was brought to the opera stage in 2000. Also Toni Morrison contributed to the implementation of the female view in the operatic world – first in 2005 in Detroit with the opera Margaret Garner, composed by Richard Danielpour, then in 2011 with the play Desdemona, created in cooperation with Peter Sellars and Rokia Traoré. The opera is loosely based on actual events in the life of runaway slave Margaret Garner, who killed her two children to prevent them being returned to slavery.

=== First transgender operas ===
The 2014 chamber opera As One by Laura Kaminsky shows the transition journey of a transgender woman. It tells the story of Hannah, represented by two singers — a baritone (Hannah before) and a mezzo-soprano (Hannah after). Rather than depicting a medical transition, the opera explores family, memory, identity and self-acceptance. It is considered to be the first opera worldwide in this field and has become one of the most frequently performed contemporary American operas.

In 2023, a new opera by Tobias Picker with a libretto by his husband Aryeh Lev Stollman premiered in St. Gallen, Switzerland: Lili Elbe. It dramatized the life of pioneering Danish painter and transgender woman Lili Elbe, with Lucia Lucas creating the title role. The singer, a trans-baritone, had been already chosen by Tobias Picker (as artistic director of the Tulsa Opera) in 2019 for the title role of his Don Giovanni production.

=== The singers ===
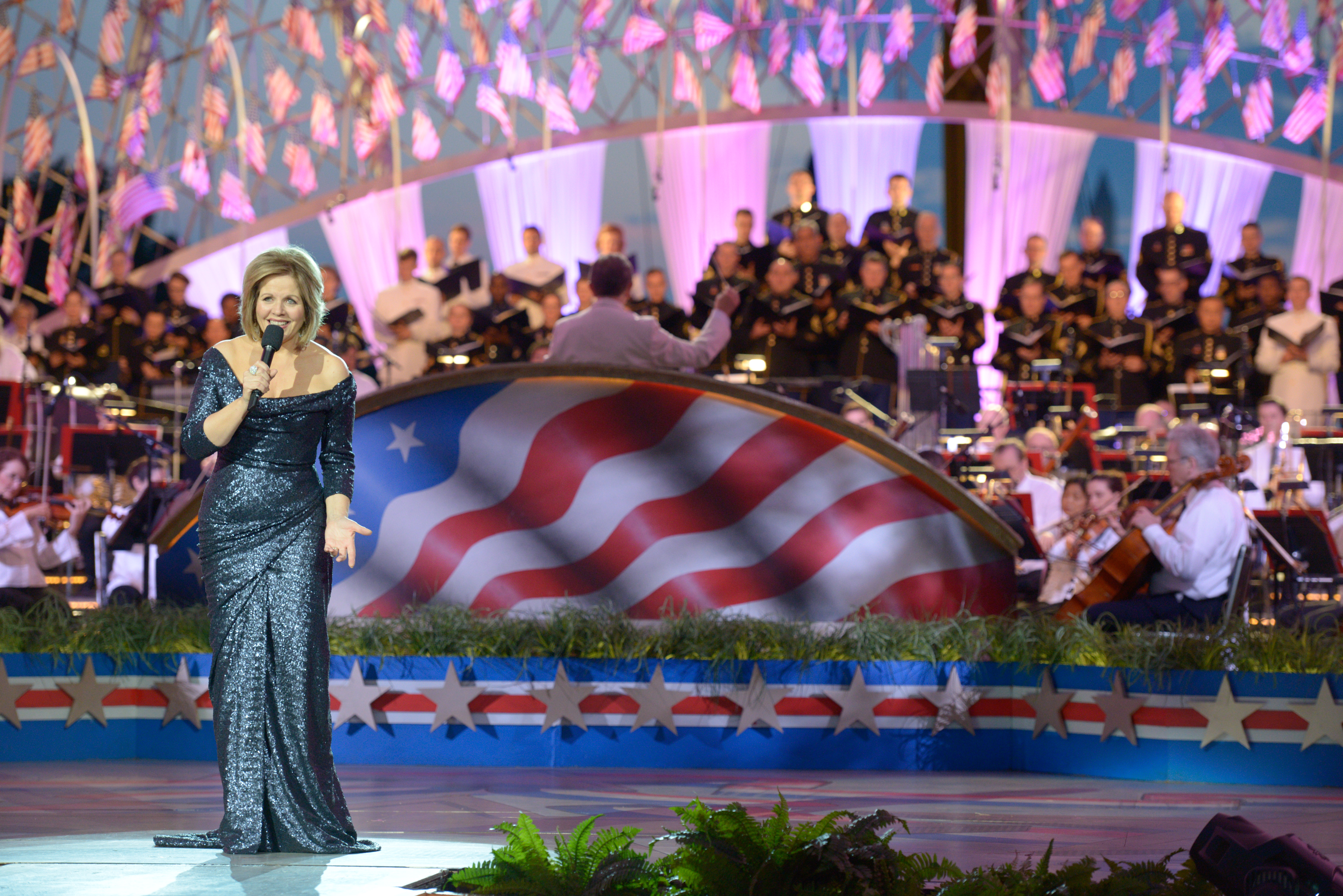
Renée Fleming at the National Memorial Day Concert, 2017

In 2014, Renée Fleming became the first opera singer to perform the national anthem at a Super Bowl. Her performance at Super Bowl XLVIII at MetLife Stadium was notable for its elegance and was seen by many as a significant moment for classical music in the American mainstream.

Among the most successful US American singers of the 21st century are Matthew Polenzani, Joyce DiDonato, Christine Goerke, Stephanie Blythe, Lawrence Brownlee, Angela Meade and counter tenor Anthony Roth Costanzo. All of them perform regularly in Europa.

In 2017, Spoleto Festival USA engaged a trans male singer, Adrian Angelico, for Luca Francesconi’s experimental work Quartett. A trans female singer, Breanna Sinclairé, has performed arias with the San Francisco and Colorado symphonies.

=== Times of crisis ===
The 2020s brought crisis to opera in the US, it suffered massive shortfall. The companies reported dwindling ticket sales, rising costs and slumping philanthropy. According to a report about the Detroit Opera by The Free Press contributions fell $1,889,226 from fiscal year 2023 to 2024, primarily due to a $1,744,477 loss of government grants. Public donations fell by $145,749. Two prominent institutions were hit especially hard: the Met and the Washington National Opera.

The Met found itself in a desperate hunt for cash. It looked to a foreign government, to new strategies, even to outer space, in order to sustain the country's largest performing arts organization. Since 2024, the Met had had to withdraw many millions from its endowment to address declining revenues, at least a third of its once sacrosanct fund. General manager Peter Gelb sought help from Saudi Arabia – offering five winter seasons in Riyadh – and even courted Elon Musk, promising the tech billionaire – only half jokingly – to produce an opera in outer space, i.e. Tosca on planet Mars. In February 2026, the Met even considered selling its Marc Chagall murals at Lincoln Center, as long as the new owner accepts the condition that the art works remain in the opera house.

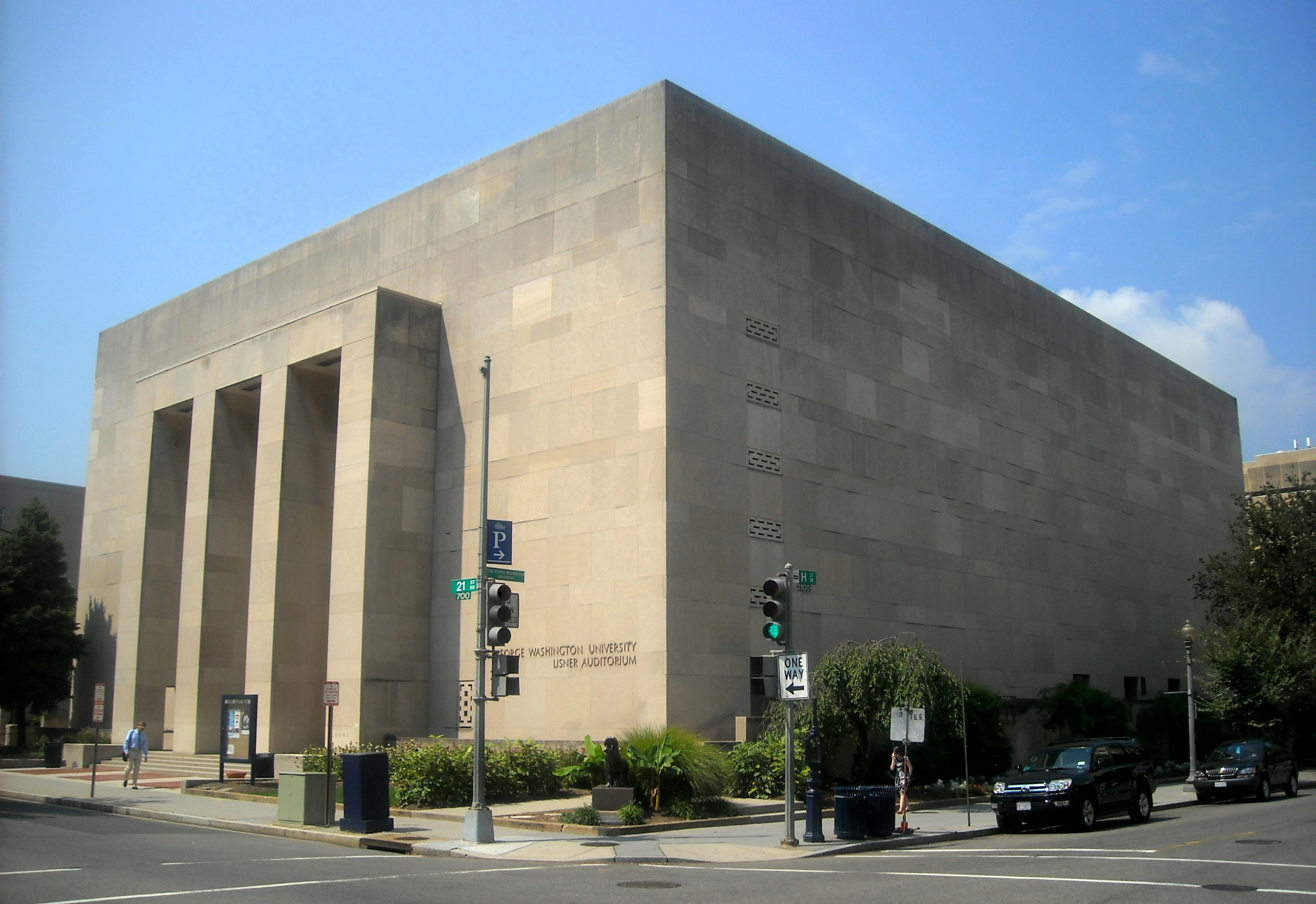
The Lisner Auditorium, the home of Washington National Opera since 2026

In January 2026 it was announced that Washington National Opera would be leaving the John F. Kennedy Center for the Performing Arts, its home since 1971. Artistic director Francesca Zambello, who has led the company for 14 seasons, shared her regrets and her hopes, that the WNO ″remains committed to its mission and artistic vision″. After the hostile takeover of the Kennedy Center by the Trump administration, there was no room any longer for productions such as Treemonisha or The Crucible. WNO returned to its origins, the Lisner Auditorium at George Washington University, a private institution. There, both Treemonisha and The Crucible received enthusiastic acclaim from the public and the press, sold-out performances and standing ovations. The Washington Post called Zambello's staging of The Crucible by Arthur Miller and Robert Ward ″gripping″.

By court order, the name Trump had to be removed from the Kennedy Center in June 2026. Following this, attorneys from the justice department requested that President Donald Trump's name be reinstated on the building. The president's men also considered demolishing the building entirely and constructing an open-air amphitheater in its place. This would not be suitable for opera performances.

=== First Hawaiian-language opera ===
Set in the mid-nineteenth century, the opera Kamalehua, The Sheltering Tree, is notably the first opera to be written and performed primarily in Hawaiian language (ʻŌlelo Hawaiʻi). It reveals the little-known history of the Hawaiian kingdom and its early struggles to maintain independence. The opera tells the true story of Timoteo Haʻalilio, royal secretary and lifelong friend to king Kamehameha III. In the years 1842 to 1845 Haʻalilio travelled to the United States, to Great Britain, Belgium, and France to secure treaties recognizing Hawaiʻi as a sovereign nation. He wanted to protect the kingdom from annexation by foreigners. Haʻalilio was accompanied by the Reverend William Richards, a trusted advisor. The opera premiered in 2026 at the Hawaii Opera Theatre.

== See also ==
- Opera in Latin America
- American Indian opera
- List of North American opera companies
