= Grethe Barrett Holby =

Director of operas (b. 1948)

- Born: April 26, 1948 (age 78); New Rochelle, New York, US
- Education: Massachusetts Institute of Technology (BS, MArch)
- Spouse: Arthur Elgort
- Children: 3, including Ansel Elgort

Grethe Barrett Holby (born April 26, 1948) is an American theatre producer, stage director, choreographer, and dramaturge best known for her work in opera. Holby is noted as the founder of American Opera Projects, where she served as Artistic Director from 1988 until 2001. She serves as Executive Artistic Director of Family Opera Initiative, which she founded in 1995, and Ardea Arts, Inc., which she founded in 2006. The Rockefeller Foundation awarded Holby a 2006 Creative Arts Residency The Bellagio Center.

== Early life and education ==
Holby was born in New Rochelle, New York, and grew up in Larchmont, New York, the daughter of Aase-Grethe (Hall) and Warren Barrett Holby, a founding partner of Merritt & Holby, a housing development firm. Her mother was Norwegian, and fought for the resistance and the Norwegian government-in-exile during World War II, including saving Jews in Norway. Because of these activities, she was imprisoned at a concentration camp. Her father was of German and English descent.

Holby attended Interlochen Arts Camp in 1963 and graduated from Mamaroneck High School in 1966. She then enrolled at Bryn Mawr College. Holby later transferred to the Massachusetts Institute of Technology, where she received a Bachelor of Science degree in art and design in 1971. She subsequently earned a Master of Architecture from MIT with a thesis titled, The Relationship of Theater and Architecture in the Theatrical Experience. She also cross-registered at Harvard to study set design with Franco Colavecchia.

== Career ==
=== Performing ===
In 1974, she appeared as a dancer with Laura Dean and Dance Company in New York, Washington, D.C. and Connecticut and two years later as a singer, actor and dancer for the world premiere of Philip Glass and Robert Wilson's Einstein on the Beach at the Avignon Festival, touring with the production to Hamburg, Paris, Belgrade, Venice, Brussels, Rotterdam and the Metropolitan Opera House where it was performed in November 1976. Her dance piece, "Beta Hookups" set to Lou Reed's Metal Machine Music, was performed at Merce Cunningham Studio with Reed himself filming, followed by additional performances of the work at The Kitchen. Her theatre-dance piece titled Dancers premiered at the Dance Theater Workshop in 1977, and her four abstracts, Ode, String Out, Steady State Turning and Cycles were performed at The Kitchen in 1979 earning a positive review in The New York Times, followed by performances of her dance company, Grethe Holby and Dancers, throughout the New York area.

=== Opera ===
In the early seventies, Holby worked as Assistant Designer to Franco Colavecchia for opera productions at Brooklyn Academy of Music, the Wexford Festival and on Broadway, where he was set designer for Scott Joplin's Treemonisha in 1975. In 1976, Holby began choreographing for opera companies, first with Michigan Opera Theater (Summer Snow, Regina), then with Houston Grand Opera, where she was assistant director and choreographer as well as a member the Opera Studio for the 1982/83 season. While in Houston, she served as choreographer under director Jean-Pierre Ponnelle for Pagliacci, under Götz Friedrich for Wozzeck and as Choreographer/Assistant Director to Nathaniel Merrill for The Tales of Hoffmann as well as to Peter Mark Shifter for the world premiere of Leonard Berstein's A Quiet Place (first presented as a double-bill with Trouble in Tahiti and later revised to combine both works). The full version of A Quiet Place was presented at La Scala, followed by Washington Opera in 1984 retaining Holby as Assistant Director and Choreographer. She choreographed the 1983 world premiere of Gian Carlo Menotti's A Bride from Pluto, and was associate director and choreographer for the 1988 premiere of the Michael Kaye version of Offenbach's Tales of Hoffmann (directed by Frank Corsaro and starring Plácido Domingo) at the Los Angeles Music Center Opera.

She began directing standard opera repertory for numerous opera companies including productions of Faust for Opera Company of Philadelphia (broadcast on National Public Television), Opera Memphis and Indianapolis Opera as well as productions for Anchorage Opera (Rigoletto, Hansel & Gretel), Opera Co. of North Carolina, (La Traviata), Toledo Opera (Daughter of the Regiment), Wolf Trap Opera Company (with her own edition, translation, and production of Haydn’s The Apothecary), the world-premiere of Vincent Persichetti's The Sibyl with Pennsylvania Opera Theater, Minnesota Opera's Animalen, by Lars Johan Werle (US premiere), which opened the Ordway Center for the Performing Arts and Lake George Opera's 1986 production of Carousel. Recently Holby directed the 2007 U.S. premiere of The True Last Words of Dutch Schultz by Eric Salzman and Valeria Vasilevski for the Center for Contemporary Opera at New York's Symphony Space. She directed the 2012 world staged premiere of Erik Satie's Socrate at The Flea Theater (incorporating John Cage's Cheap Imitation) presented in a double-bill with Cage's Europera V.

=== American Opera Projects ===
As Founder and Artistic Director of American Opera Projects, Holby was instrumental in commissioning, developing, and directing more than twenty-five new opera works. She directed the premiere productions of Memoirs of Uliana Rooney (1996) by Vivian Fine at the Annenberg Center for the Performing Arts, Hildegurls: Electric Ordo Virtutum (1998) by Eve Beglarian, Kitty Brazelton, Lisa Bielawa and Elaine Kaplinsky at the Lincoln Center Festival (released on CD by Innova Recordings in 2009), Sir Gawain and the Green Knight (2001) by Richard Peaslee (TADA! & Orlando Shakespeare Co.), and Fireworks! (2002) by Brazelton and librettist Billy Aronson (Fort Greene Park, Brooklyn, NY).

=== Family Opera Initiative & Ardea Arts, Inc. ===
Family Opera Initiative (FOI) was founded by Holby in 1995 as part of the American Opera Projects (AOP) to develop opera theater works for family audiences. During this time, Holby developed several works including Sir Gawain and the Green Knight, Fireworks! and Flurry Tale. In 2001, the two entities separated and Holby left AOP, becoming head of the newly-independent FOI. In 2006, Holby founded Ardea Arts, Inc, a not-for-profit company dedicated to commissioning, developing and producing new opera and music theater works, at which time FOI came under Ardea Arts and a full-company member of Opera America.

She collaborated with Kitty Brazelton and George Plimpton to create Animal Tales, a full-length musical-opera. The work was completed in 2008 and in March 25, 2017 the opera received its world concert premiere with the Garden State Philharmonic. In 2010 Holby collaborated with Brazelton and Plimpton again to premier Cat, a one-act opera-musical commissioned under the FOI at the Central Park Zoo.

In 2016, Holby worked on The Three Astronauts, a space opera which she conceived in 2007 and was based on the children's picture book of the same name by Umberto Eco and Eugenio Carmi. To produce the work, Holby collaborated with writers and composers from Russia and China, including Dmitry Glukhovsky, Liu Sola, Ye Xiaogang and Alexander Tchaykovskiy.

== Personal life ==
Holby lives in New York City with her husband, photographer Arthur Elgort. Their children are photographer Sophie Elgort, filmmaker Warren Elgort (born 1989), and actor and singer Ansel Elgort.
