= Family Opera Initiative =

- Formation: 1995
- Founder: Grethe Barrett Holby
- Type: Opera Company
- Location: New York City
- Artistic director: Grethe Barrett Holby
- Parent organization: Ardea Arts
- Website: www.ardeaarts.com

Family Opera Initiative (FOI) is an American opera company based in New York City that commissions, develops, and premieres original works for cross-generational audiences. It was founded in 1995 by Grethe Barrett Holby, originally as part of American Opera Projects (also founded by Holby). Its mission was and remains to create new repertory for family audiences, to bring the experience of opera to a diverse audience, and to engage the community in the process and performance of their works.

Since its founding, Family Opera Initiative has developed a series of "opera-musicals" for family audiences: Flurry Tale (1999), Sir Gawain and the Green Knight (2001), Fireworks! (2002), and Animal Tales (2008). Past and present collaborators on their productions include Billy Aronson, George Plimpton, Kitty Brazelton, Rusty Magee, Franco Colavecchia, Richard Peaslee, and Eugenio Carmi. The company performs around the United States in partnership with other theaters, theater companies, and public or educational institutions. Their performances range from workshops to fully staged productions. Family Opera Initiative is a non-profit organization. Its commissions and productions have been supported by the Jaffe Family Foundation, the New York State Council for the Arts, and TADA! Youth Theater. Their development partners include the Atlantic Center for the Arts, Ardea Arts, and Montclair State University.

== Production history ==
=== Flurry Tale ===
Flurry Tale had its premiere in December 1999 at the Clark Studio Theater in New York City's Lincoln Center for the Performing Arts, and has been presented at many workshops at the American Opera Projects South Oxford Space, New York area schools, and the New York Public Library. Flurry Tale is a one-act opera-musical composed by Rusty Magee to a libretto by Billy Aronson and was originated, developed and directed by Grethe Barrett Holby. It is scored for piano, two male voices (tenor and bass) and three female voices (2 sopranos, 1 mezzo-soprano)

The comic plot revolves around a young girl, Emma, and her harried father who proclaims his disbelief in Santa Claus and talking snowmen. A group of familiar holiday figures set out to prove that they really exist. The holiday figures squabble amongst themselves while plotting the downfall of Emma's father until she reminds them all of the spirit of the season.

=== Sir Gawain and the Green Knight ===
Sir Gawain and the Green Knight had its stage premiere in New York City in October 2001, presented by American Opera Projects and TADA! Youth Theater, with Anthony Pulgram as Sir Gawain It has since played in Boston and Orlando, Florida. The 70 minute, one-act work was composed by Richard Peaslee to a libretto by Kenneth Cavander. The direction and dramaturgy are by Grethe Barrett Holby. . The work is scored for three male voices (tenor, bass-baritone, and bass) and one female voice (mezzo-soprano). The story is based on the Arthurian legend of Sir Gawain and the Green Knight.

=== Fireworks! ===
Fireworks premiered in an outdoor performance in Fort Greene Park, Brooklyn on July 2, 2002, produced by American Opera Projects. A comic "opera-musical", it was composed by Kitty Brazelton to a libretto by Billy Aronson, originated and directed by Grethe Barrett Holby. The full orchestra version is scored for violin, electric guitar, cello, clarinet, bass clarinet, flute, alto and baritone saxophone, percussion, and synthesizer. The work is cast for a chorus and six solo voices:

- Intergalactic Toqueville (soprano)
- High school nerd (baritone)
- Pompous actor (tenor)
- Single mother (contralto)
- Her rebellious daughter (mezzo-soprano)
- Park groundskeeper (bass)

The story involves a benevolent alien (Intergalactic Toqueville) who travels to Earth to find out why humans shoot "colored lights" into the sky at the same time each year. In the course of her investigations, she encounters a series of characters gathered in a park to watch the 4th of July fireworks – a nerdy high school student, a rebellious teenage girl, her single working mother, a pompous actor who's preparing for the July 4th play, and a groundskeeper, who wishes people would take more pride in their park. The alien is won over to the idea of democracy and vows to take the message to the rest of the universe.

=== Animal Tales ===
Act I of Animal Tales was first performed in a workshop for the Atlantic Center for the Arts in January 2005. Act II had its first performance in a workshop for the Montclair State University Peak Performances Series in July 2006. The work was first performed in its entirety in Theater Works USA workshops at the Chelsea Studios on November 11, 12, 13, 14, and 16, 2008.

Animal Tales is a full length musical-opera in two acts composed by Kitty Brazelton to a libretto by George Plimpton, originated and directed Grethe Barrett Holby. The score integrates American musical idioms into classical structures, using classically trained, R&B and jazz vocal styles as well as DJ turntable, and Latin percussion. The full premiere version orchestra uses 1 pianist, 1 Latin percussionist/hand drummer, 1 DJ, 5 string players, 1 plucked string player (doubling on mandolin and guitar or harp), 4 wind instrumentalists (flute, oboe, saxophone/clarinet, and bassoon) and 2 brass players (trumpet and trombone). The touring version of the orchestra consists of DJ, Piano, and Latin Percussion. The cast has a children's chorus plus six male voices (boy soprano, tenor, bass-baritone, bass, and 2 baritones) and two female voices (soprano and mezzo-soprano)

The story revolves around seven animals who go to their veterinarian with the desire to change their lives. Each animal is granted their wish. Following a large storm, the animals return one by one, to recount their adventures, supplemented with dancing and exclamations from the chorus. The animals include a break dancing turtle, a horse who wants to be a 'rider', a dog who wants to howl like a wolf, and a goldfish who wants to swim in the Sea of Japan.

== Works in development ==
As of 2009, The Three Astronauts is a collaborative project being developed by the Family Opera Initiative. Conceived by its director, Grethe Barrett Holby, as a space opera, The Three Astronauts is based on the children's picture book of the same name written by Umberto Eco and illustrated by Eugenio Carmi. The story involves a Russian, a Chinese, and an American astronaut who all arrive on Mars at the same time. In their fear and loneliness, they band together to hunt down and kill the Martian they encounter, but ultimately embrace him as a friend. The work is envisaged as an integration of orchestral passages, children's chorus, sung and spoken text, movement, and visual theater. It will be performed in English, Chinese, Russian and "Martian" with each of the astronauts performing in their own language without supertitles. Librettists and composers from each country will write the dialogue and music for the astronauts, with a new language created for the Martian. American poet Nikki Giovanni's We're Going to Mars forms the text for the children's chorus. Eugenio Carmi will be the lead designer.

The project's development partners are Ardea Arts and Atlantic Center for the Arts, with major funding provided The Jaffe Family Foundation.

== Gallery ==
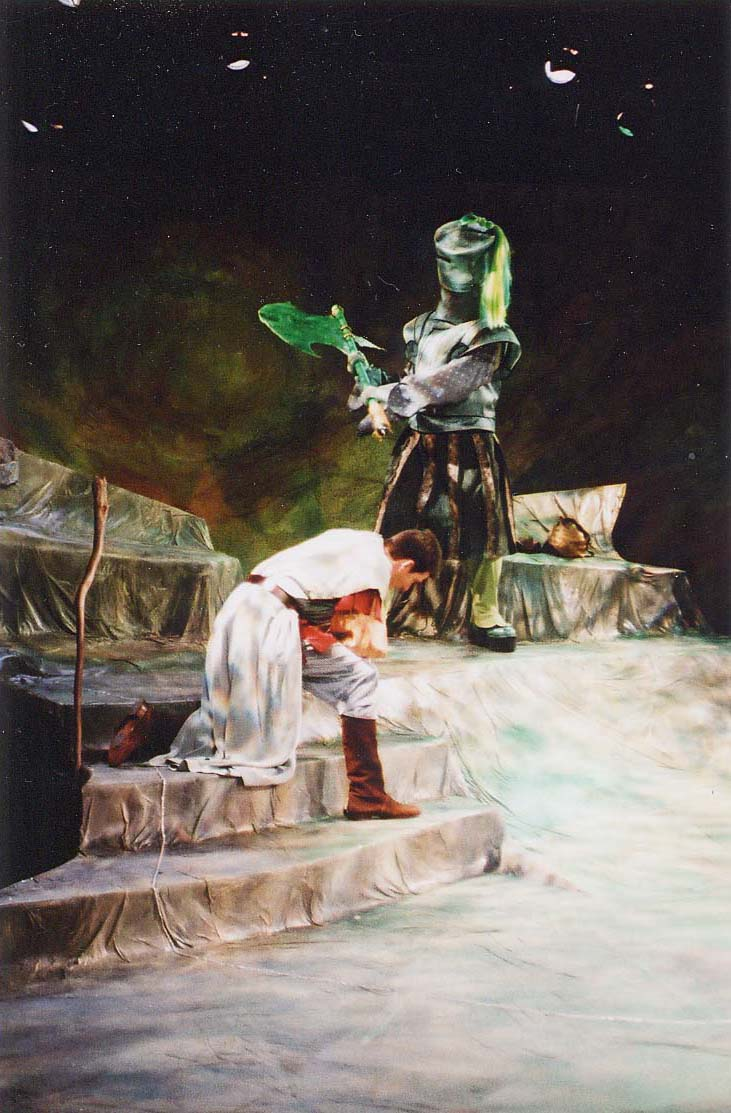
Anthony Pulgram and Ricardo Herrera in Sir Gawain and the Green Knight (2001)

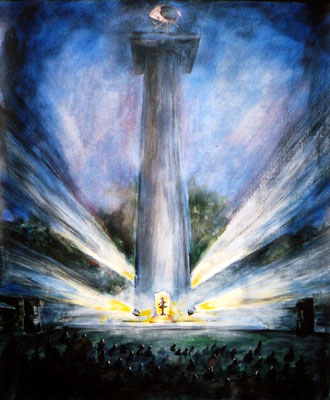
Stage design by Kelly Hanson for the opening scene of Fireworks (2002)
