= November Criminals (disambiguation) =

November Criminals may refer to:

- November criminals, a description by advocates of the stab-in-the-back myth of German government leaders who signed the Armistice in 1918
- The November Criminals, a 2010 novel by Sam Munson
- November Criminals (film), a 2017 American crime drama
