= Hayley Faith Negrin =

American actress

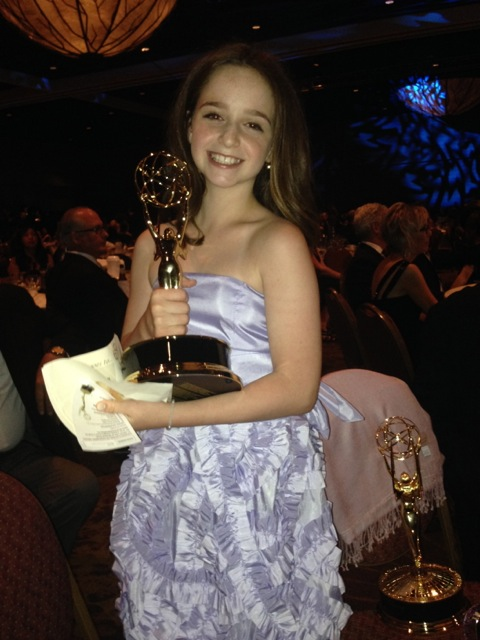
- Negrin with her Emmy Award in 2014
- Born: April 9, 2003 (age 23); New York City, New York, U.S.
- Occupation: Actress
- Years active: 2010–present
- Known for: Peg + Cat

Hayley Faith Negrin (born April 9, 2003) is an American actress, best known for her voice work on the PBS Kids television series Peg + Cat.

Born in New York City, Negrin now resides in Weston, Connecticut, with her family. A performer since an early age, her professional career began in 2010 when she appeared in a national television commercial for Verizon. In 2013, she was picked from hundreds of girls to star in the lead role as Peg in Peg + Cat. Series creators Billy Aronson and Jennifer Oxley both stated that Negrin "sounded like a real kid, not too polished or over-rehearsed" and won the role "with her quirky voice and raw talent".

In 2014, Negrin won a Daytime Emmy Award for Outstanding Performer in an Animated Program for her work on Peg + Cat. She was the second youngest person to be nominated for that category, the youngest person to be nominated for that category was Danica Lee in 2007 and 2008.
