= Benefit of the Doubt (1967 film) =

1967 British film by Peter Whitehead

- Screenshot
- Directed by: Peter Whitehead
- Produced by: Carole Weisweiller, Dominique Antoine
- Starring: Peter Brook; Michael Kustow; Michael Williams; Glenda Jackson
- Cinematography: Peter Whitehead
- Music by: Richard Peaslee
- Production companies: Lorrimer Films, Saga
- Release date: 1967
- Running time: 60 minutes
- Country: United Kingdom
- Language: English

Benefit of the Doubt (also known as US) is a 1967 British documentary film directed by Peter Whitehead. Its subject is the production of Peter Brook's anti-Vietnam protest play US, with the Royal Shakespeare Company. It was filmed at London's Aldwych Theatre and features Peter Brook, Michael Kustow, Michael Williams and Glenda Jackson.

Brook also adapted US as a film, Tell Me Lies (1968).

== Cast ==
- Peter Brook
- Michael Kustow
- Michael Williams
- Glenda Jackson

== Reception ==
Stuart Heaney wrote for the BFI: "Although controversial in the right-wing press, the play was criticised for its ambiguity by many opposed to the war. In interviews throughout the film, Brook is at pains to clarify that his concern was not to provide answers but to interrogate the war's reality and Britain's place in it. Since the only experience of the war available to the British was images filtered via the media (Vietnam was regarded as the world's first 'television war'), it is only through this evidence that judgements could be formed – hence the play's methodology. Interestingly, the film brings the play back within the arena of images, enabling the viewer to respond, in turn, to the play within the film."

In Film Comment, Henry K. Miller wrote: "Pitched somewhere between documentary and filmed theater, The Benefit of the Doubt (1967) is concerned ... with role-playing and the performer-spectator relationship. Interspersing scenes from US, the Royal Shakespeare Company’s ambiguously titled 1966 attempt to address the Vietnam War on the West End stage, with interviews with the actors and writers behind it, the film anticipates the turn in the European New Wave – Rivette, Straub, Bertolucci – toward political theater. The play’s Brechtian first act combined didactic sketches, documentary reconstructions, and satirical songs; the second, moving further into Artaud territory, was given over to self-criticism, concluding with a frighteningly intense speech accusing the audience and cast of bad faith and passivity. Whitehead’s film cuts to this monologue from an interview, shot in black-and-white, with the actor who performed it and who declares herself “suspicious and critical” of the whole enterprise, and then runs her speech over color documentary footage of a demonstration outside the U.S. embassy. The color-coded transition at once suggests political activism as theater—as in Bertolucci’s Partner—and admits the theater’s powerlessness."
