= Eric Allen (disambiguation) =

Eric Allen (born 1965) is an American football cornerback.

Eric Allen may also refer to:

- Eric Allen (wide receiver) (1949–2015), Michigan State running back and CFL wide receiver
- Eric Allen (musician), American musician

== See also ==
- Eric Allan (1940–2026), British actor
