= Benefit of the Doubt =

Benefit of the Doubt may refer to:

- Benefit of the Doubt (1967 film), a British documentary
- Benefit of the Doubt (1993 film), an English-language German thriller
- Jesse Stone: Benefit of the Doubt, a 2012 American television film
- The Benefit of the Doubt, a 2017 Belgian thriller film
- "Benefit of Doubt" (Maverick), a 1961 TV episode
