= Erika Olde =

- Education: Regent's University London
- Occupations: Film producer, Financier
- Website: Black Bicycle Entertainment

Erika Olde is an entrepreneur, film producer, financier and billionaire heiress. She is the founder and CEO of Black Bicycle Entertainment and the Erika Film Foundation. In 2021, Olde created Olde & New, a cooking and recipe website.

== Biography ==
Olde founded Black Bicycle Entertainment, a Los Angeles based film production company, in 2014. Olde had no formal training or industry connections prior to starting her film career, something she credits as an advantage. She was a marketing student in London when she began helping her friends shoot documentaries and music videos. She then pursued a career in film, hiring an agent and reviewing scripts.

Her first project was November Criminals, a crime drama film based on the book of the same name. Her other projects include the films The Female Brain and Home Again. In 2017, she was featured in Variety Magazine's Women's Impact Report. Olde was named to Forbes's 2020 30 Under 30: Entertainment & Hollywood list.

Olde's father, Ernest Olde, a billionaire discount broker, died when she was 10.

== Philanthropy ==
In 2015, Olde founded the Erika Film Foundation and its hallmark mentorship program, IRIS IN, to improve representation in the film industry. The IRIS IN program started as a female-focused speaker series for the non-profit film school, Ghetto Film School. The program is now offered to young people in both Los Angeles and New York City and teaches the business side of the film industry. The Foundation provides students with classes, mentorships, internship opportunities and grants, while also focusing on the practical side of filmmaking such as pitch decks, marketing and distribution.

In 2019, the Erika Film Foundation announced it begin awarding an annual grant to of $500,000 to one graduating student of IRIS IN program. Olde and her foundation sponsored the Erika Film Foundation International Thesis Film Project for Ghetto Film School, helping students to produce two thesis films.

Olde was honored by Ghetto Film School for her commitment to film students and collaboration with the organization.

== Olde & New ==
In 2021, Olde launched a new digital venture, Olde & New, a destination for comfort food recipes and cooking tips. The website includes recipes that are either new takes on traditional comfort recipes or recipes that can be modified to fit different lifestyles including gluten-free, diabetic-friendly, ketogenic, vegetarian or vegan diets. Recipes feature suggested modifications or ingredient substitutes.

== Filmography ==
Year	Title	Role	Notes
2015	A Tale of Love and Darkness	Executive Producer	
2017	The Female Brain	Producer	
2017	Home Again	Producer	
2017	Woman Walks Ahead	Producer	
2017	November Criminals	Producer	
2018	American Woman	Executive Producer	
2018	JT LeRoy	Executive Producer	
2020	A Cops and Robbers Story	Executive Producer	
TBD	Untitled Brighton Zeuner Documentary	Executive Producer	
TBD	Mona Lisa and the Blood Moon	Executive Producer	
