= Bleak Moments =

1971 British film by Mike Leigh

- Film poster
- Directed by: Mike Leigh
- Written by: Mike Leigh
- Based on: 1970 stage play by Mike Leigh
- Produced by: Leslie Blair
- Starring: Anne Raitt; Sarah Stephenson; Eric Allan; Joolia Cappleman; Mike Bradwell
- Cinematography: Bahram Manocheri
- Edited by: Leslie Blair
- Production companies: Autumn Productions; Memorial Films; British Film Institute
- Distributed by: Contemporary Films
- Release dates: 30 November 1971 (London); 25 May 1972
- Running time: 106 minutes
- Country: United Kingdom
- Language: English
- Budget: £18,500

Bleak Moments is a 1971 British comedy-drama film by Mike Leigh in his directorial debut. Leigh's screenplay is based on a 1970 stage play at the Open Space Theatre, about the dysfunctional life of a young secretary.

== Plot ==
Sylvia leads a quiet life caring for her sister Hilda who has complex care needs. Their lonely suburban existence is accentuated by a social awkwardness that detaches them from the community and fuels a life of seclusion and despair.

== Cast ==
- Anne Raitt as Sylvia
- Sarah Stephenson as Hilda, Sylvia's sister
- Eric Allan as Peter
- Joolia Cappleman as Pat
- Mike Bradwell as Norman
- Donald Sumpter as Norman's friend
- Liz Smith as Pat's mother

== Production ==
=== Background ===
The film is based on a stage play which presented at the Open Space Theatre in March 1970. Leigh says the play was created in three weeks. He cast George Coulouris as Sylvia's father but he left after four days.

The Daily Telegraph said "the actors succeed in creating an atmosphere of tangible discomfort but what they ultimately assemble is a subjective sketch, not a description or even a statement on the problem of verbal communication. Leigh invited Tony Garnett to come and see the play and Garnett was encouraging about Leigh's desire to go into films.

Following the play, Leigh had an unhappy experience directing Earl Cameron in a production of Gallileo in Bermuda, after which he resolved only to work on his own material.

Leigh and Leslie Blair had formed their own production company, Autumn Productions, and Leigh wanted to adapt Moments. He was able to realise that desire when Albert Finney and Michael Medwin's Memorial Films, which had recently made If.... and was about to produce Gumshoe, "delivered the main financial backing, as well as unused spare bits of film rolls." Finney visited the actors during rehearsal. Leigh later said Memorial provided £14,000 and put in more money during post production when the filmmakers ran out.

The BFI is credited on the movie. Bruce Beresford was on the board at the time, had seen the play, and was encouraging of Leigh's plans to turn it into a movie. Leigh explains:

In order for it to be an 'official experimental film'... to be registered as a BFI experiment, it had to be a BFI film, and being an 'official experiment' meant that you didn't have to pay union rates. So, everybody who worked on the film, no matter what department and including the actors, did it for £20 a week. That was the deal and that's how we got to make the picture for £18,500 — 35 mm, 111 minutes, Eastmancolour and costing peanuts. But the thing was that the minimum amount that the BFI, in their rules, could put into a film was £100 and their contribution to the budget of Bleak Moments was £100, which made it possible to make the film.

Rehearsals started in January 1971 and went for four weeks, followed by six weeks of filming.

=== Aftermath ===
Leigh did not make another theatrical feature film until 1988. In 1977 he said "People like me should be making feature films. Nuts in May would have been a great box office success. But there's just no film industry in this country... All serious film directors have to work in television." Accordingly, he made several films for television during that period.

== Release ==
The film was shown at the London Film Festival in 1971 but did not receive a commercial release until May 1972. The film won the Golden Leopard at the Locarno Film Festival and received an arthouse release in the US and Canada.

== Reception ==
The Monthly Film Bulletin wrote: "Originally conceived as a stage play by Mike Leigh and Leslie Blair, Bleak Moments still retains many theatrical elements – confined locations, emphasis on dialogue, finely drawn and executed characterisation, and little action in the cinematic sense of the word. But where the camera excels is in its pinpointing of numerous details which make the circumstances of these characters so frighteningly authentic. The film may be considered on two levels: first, as a tragi-comedy – with Sylvia, the secret sherry-drinker; Peter, the advocate of McLuhan who cannot string a coherent sentence together; the Malteser-eating Pat (resplendent in home-knitted jerseys of the type she is constantly knitting), horrified when her mother leaves her false teeth out when 'guests are here' in the shape of a mute twenty-nine-year-old with a mental age of two; and Norman, nervously strumming one drug song after another on his guitar, confessing that he comes not from Doncaster but from Scunthorpe. As a tragi-comedy the film is overlong and slow-moving, but contains episodes of genuine humour and pathos. On a second, more metaphysical Bleak Moments is a telling indictment of a society which provides education and a tolerable degree of affluence, but fails to teach people to understand themselves, and thus to communicate with others. The flat, two-dimensional photography, the exaggerated slowness and repetition of the action, the over-acting of Peter and Pat – all these aspects heighten the total inability of the characters to come to terms with and break out of their inhibited mental and physical state. Hilda, of course, mirrors this situation since she is handicapped through fault of birth, while the others have the potential to lead happy lives but do not, the hard-hitting propaganda of Family Life, with which it is bound to be compared, but it grows in stature through avoiding sensationalism, and is an encouraging directorial debut from Mike Leigh."

The Guardian called it "a striking and entirely original first feature."

The critic Michael Coveney (writing in 1996) wrote that "Even though the sound quality is poor and the pace a little on the leisurely side - there is tonal assurance and technical finesse in the presentation of the marvellous performances that proclaims both originality and talent. Sylvia is heard playing Chopin's E-flat Nocturne over the opening credits. The general inability to express inner feelings reinforces a mood of bleak, Slavic despair..[there is a] Chekhovian atmosphere, unrelieved by the sort of cathartic climax that characterises most of Leigh's subsequent work." And Coveney praised Leigh's "poetic sensitivity to what G.K.Chesterton called 'the significance of the unexamined life.' Even the exterior shots have a plaintive, insistent quality, with beautifully composed views of pebbledash houses and garages, of clear roads and tall trees, around West Norwood and Tulse Hill."

John Coleman in New Statesman called it, "the most remarkable début by a British director, working on an absurdly low budget and with unknown actors, that I have ever seen."

Roger Ebert in the Chicago Sun Times said "Bleak Moments is a masterpiece, plain and simple... its greatness is not just in the direction or subject, but in the complete singularity of the performances."

Tony Garnett, the innovative and radical producer, admired the stage performance and was impressed with the subsequent film. He 'spotted Leigh's potential immediately' and his support would prove invaluable. Garnett was providing several films a year for the BBC, and would also produce Leigh's next project, Hard Labour, for BBC Television in 1973.

== Home media ==
Bleak Moments has been released in 4:3 aspect ratio several times in the UK: VHS (BFI/Connoisseur Video, 2000), DVD (Soda Pictures, 2008, 2015), and as part of The Mike Leigh Film Collection box set (Spirit Entertainment Ltd, 2008).

It has also seen US release by Water Bearer Films, Inc. on VHS (1998), DVD (2004), and in their Mike Leigh Collection, Vol. 2 box set (2004).

A remastered Blu-ray of the film was released by the BFI in November 2021.
