= Flavio Costantini =

Italian artist (1926–2013)

Flavio Constantini
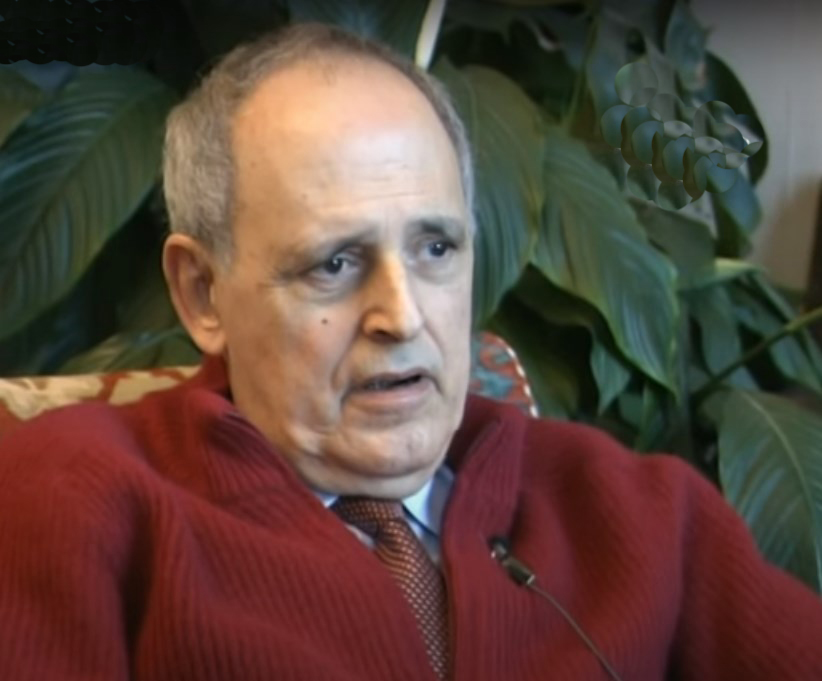
- Born: September 21, 1926; Rome
- Died: May 20, 2013 (aged 86); Genoa
- Occupation: Artist

Flavio Costantini (21 September 1926 – 20 May 2013) was an Italian painter and illustrator. Costantini created portraits of writers and artists for newspapers, and illustrated several novels. His early works were inspired by the novelist Franz Kafka, and by literary, utopian, and anarchist ideals. His later work presented a pessimistic view of civilization. He created series of paintings exploring historical themes: anarchy, the wreck of the Titanic, alchemy, Mozart, the French Revolution and its victims, Yekaterinburg, and the murder of Nicholas II and his family. His last series offered a dark reading of Pinocchio, which he considered one of the three or four greatest Italian novels.

== Biography ==
In September 1926 he was born in Rome to middle-class parents. His father was an amateur painter, and as a child, Costantini was crafty, and kept a diary accompanied with newspaper cut-outs, collages, photos and drawings. He was forced to drop out of the first high school he attended after he failed his French and Latin exams. He subsequently enrolled at the nautical high school, and later certified as a sea captain. He served for a short time in the Italian Navy, and from 1951 to 1954 worked in the Merchant Marine, which enabled him to travel to new cities around the world. On his return to Genoa in 1955, he began working as a commercial artist and textile designer.

He moved with his family to Rapallo and in 1959, after a visit to Spain, devoted a series of paintings to bullfighting (called Tauromachie 1, 2, 3). He was a member of the artists group that founded the Galleria del Deposito in Boccadasse, Genoa. Other members were Eugenio Carmi, Emanuele Luzzati, Carlo Vita, etc. A collector of old illustrated magazines, he used this material to create in his Rapallo home and studio paintings and portraits, which typically include period pieces and advertisements. He often depicted scenes in Genoa (squares, shops, buildings, boats), contrasting the old and the new. Costantini died on 20 May 2013, in Genoa after a short illness. A memorial, with talks by friends and critics, was held on 12 June 2013 at the Museo Luzzati, Genoa, which holds a number of his works.

== Inspiration ==
Costantini first experimented with illustration as a hobby during his time at sea, when he was inspired to make a series of roughly one hundred black and white drawings after reading Kafka's novels: "I started to draw because I read the Kafka books … it was impossible to write like Kafka, so I began to draw."

It was Costantini's childhood experiences of World War II that first led him to address the suffering and meaninglessness of the world in his art. But it was after a month-long visit to Moscow in 1962, that Costantini became disabused of his communist beliefs and became interested in utopianism. Shortly thereafter, he read Victor Serge's Memoirs of a Revolutionary and became inspired by the era of French anarchism it depicted. Although full of contradictions, he referred to the anarchists it depicted as "people who demanded, before anything else, harmony between words and deeds." Of this time, Costantini said, "I started to promote the idea of anarchism as far as I could," and he continued to depict anarchism in his works over the course of the next several decades.

== Art ==
Costantini worked primarily in tempera, and his characteristic style appeared "like a sun-illuminated stained glass window in a cathedral .... Events are captured without perspective and on a single plane in a startlingly innovative manner," with highly researched detail and architectural precision that "provide an element of photographic realism that contrasts starkly with the decorative backdrop." A particular hallmark of Constantini's work is "the subversion of traditional perspective rules in favor of a multiplication of the vanishing points." His works show influence from styles such as art nouveau, pop art, theater set design, and Mexican muralism.

A series of paintings, known as "the anarchists cycle," completed between 1963 and 1979, depicted historic anarchist figures and events, such as Ravachol, Nestor Mahkno, Errico Malatesta, and Mikhail Bakunin, the executions of Francisco Ferrer (by firing squad) and Auguste Vaillant (by guillotine), the Industrial Workers of the World, the illegalist Bonnot gang and the Night Workers, and the assassination of Archduke Ferdinand. Costantini undertook furious historical research about the figures and locations he depicted, visiting the Paris police archives at the Quai des Orfévres and the Bibliothèque Nationale in Paris, as well as the Archivio di Stato in Rome, and titling each paintings with the date and place of the incident featured. He also included an element of subversive anachronism through such details as depicting the policemen firing on strikers in Chicago in 1886, that became known as the Haymarket affair, with the faces of four US presidents and the capture of Ravachol with Toulouse-Lautrec as the arresting officer. The final painting in the series, titled Casa Ipat'ev, shows an empty room with bullet holes in the walls, depicting the room in which the Romanovs were murdered and expressing Constantini's disillusionment with the political violence that had featured in his series. Costantini stated that "he could no longer distinguish between victim and butcher."

This anarchists cycle artworks were later collected and published in the book The Art of Anarchy, originally published in 1975 by Stuart Christie at Cienfuegos Press, and republished in 1986 by Black Flag.

== Influence ==
The American anarchist poet Philip Levine's poem, "Gift for a Believer," published in The Names of the Lost (1976), is dedicated to Costantini and mentions many of the anarchists depicted in his paintings. Levine's later poem "On a Drawing by Flavio" describes Costantini's stark portrait of the Rabbi of Auschwitz, who "bows his head and prays / for us all," and used this illustration on the cover of his book Ashes: Poems New and Old (1978).

== Novels illustrated ==
- The Pony by Vladimir Mayakovsky (1969, reprint 2006)
- Heart by Edmondo De Amicis (1977)
- The Shadow-Line by Joseph Conrad (1989)
- Notes from Underground by Fyodor Dostoyevsky (1997)

== See also ==
- Anarchist art
