= Arthur Elgort =

American fashion photographer (born 1940)

- Born: June 8, 1940 (age 86); New York City, U.S.
- Education: Hunter College
- Occupation: Fashion Photographer
- Spouse: Grethe Barrett Holby
- Children: 3, including Ansel Elgort and Sophie Elgort
- Awards: CFDA Board of Directors Award (2011); Sundance Film Festival – Best Cinematography (1994)
- Website: arthurelgort.com

Arthur Elgort (born June 8, 1940) is an American fashion photographer best known for his work with Vogue magazine.

== Early life and education ==
Elgort was born in Brooklyn, New York City, to Sophie (née Didimamoff) and Harry Elgort (April 10, 1908 – October 23, 1998), a restaurant owner. He is of Russian-Jewish heritage. Raised in New York City, he attended Stuyvesant High School and Hunter College, where he studied painting.

== Career ==
Elgort began his career working as a photo assistant to Gosta "Gus" Peterson. Elgort's 1971 debut in British Vogue created a sensation in the Fashion Photography world where his soon-to-be iconic "snapshot" style and emphasis on movement and natural light liberated the idea of fashion photography. In September 2008, he told Teen Vogue that he credited Mademoiselle for his big break: "They were really brave and gave me a chance. It was the first time I was shooting a cover instead of a half-page here or there."

He worked for such magazines as Vogue and International Vogue, Glamour, GQ, Rolling Stone, and Teen Vogue, and shooting advertising campaigns with fashion labels as Chanel, Valentino, and Yves Saint Laurent. He continued to work for fashion publications, as well as working on 2009 advertising campaigns with Via Spiga and Liz Claiborne with Isaac Mizrahi. His work is exhibited in the permanent collections of the International Center of Photography in New York, in the Victoria and Albert Museum in London and in the Museum of Fine Arts in Houston, Texas.

In 2011, Elgort won the CFDA Board of Directors' Award.

== Personal life ==
Elgort resides in New York City with his wife, Grethe Barrett Holby, who is a producer, stage director, choreographer, and dramaturge. They have a daughter, fashion photographer Sophie Elgort, and two sons, filmmaker Warren Elgort and actor and singer Ansel Elgort.

Elgort's nephew is stand-up comedian Sam Morril.

== Books ==
- Personal Fashion Picture. 1983. p. 109. OCLC 17282579.
- Arthur Elgort's models manual. Grand Street Press. c. 1993. p. 384. ISBN 0963923609. Photographs of several super models like Christy Turlington, Paulina Porizkova, and Linda Evangelista
- Camera Ready: how to shoot your kids. St Martins Press. 1997. p. 208. ISBN 0789301032.
- Camera Crazy. Steidl. 2004. ISBN 3865210279.

== Films ==
Elgort made several films, including Colorado Cowboy that follows legendary cowboy, Bruce Ford, and which won the award for Best Cinematography at the Sundance Film Festival in 1994.

- Texas Tenor: The Illinois Jacquet Story
- Colorado Cowboy: The Bruce Ford Story: Winner Best Cinematography at the Sundance Film Festival 1994

Additionally, Elgort serves as the subject of a documentary directed and produced by his son, Warren Elgort. The film, titled Arthur Elgort: Models & Muses, is set to premiere at the Hamptons International Film Festival in October of 2025.

== Exhibits ==
- "Arthur Elgort 1970-2010", Staley Wise Gallery
- "The Big Picture" (2015), Carla Sozzani Gallery (Milan)
