= Ursula Mohan =

British actress (born 1946)

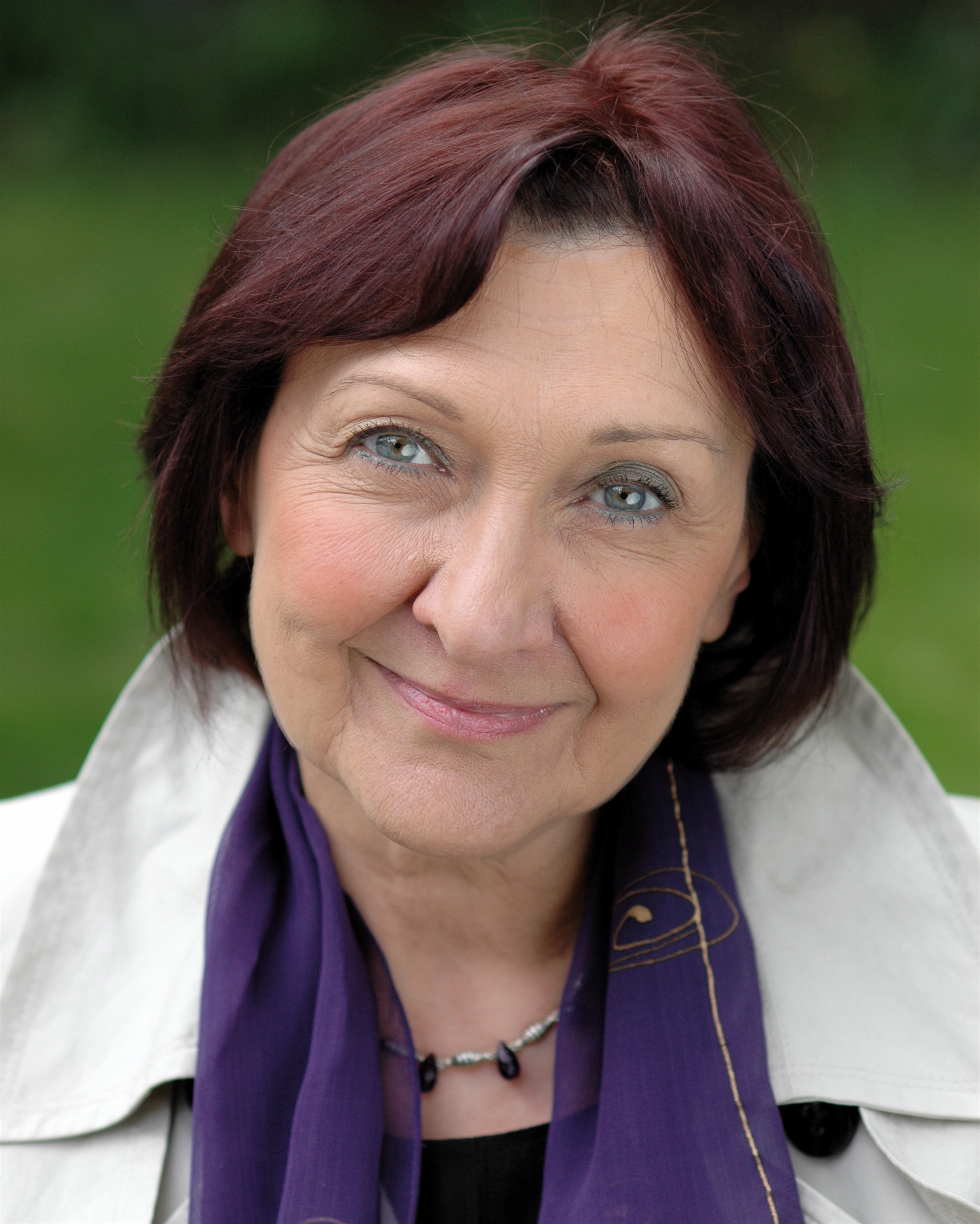
- Born: Ursula Hazel Mohan; 9 January 1946 (age 79); India
- Occupation: Actress
- Spouses: Seymour Matthews (m. 1972; div. 1975) Ian Watt-Smith (m. 1976)
- Children: 2

Ursula Mohan is a British actress. From 25 May 1966 she appeared in Sławomir Mrożek's play Tango at the Aldwych Theatre alongside Patience Collier, Mike Pratt, Peter Jeffrey and Dudley Sutton under director Trevor Nunn. In 2014 and 2016 she took the title role in Phil Willmott's Queen Lear, an adaptation of William Shakespeare's King Lear.

In film she has had minor roles in The Bank Job (2008), Tell Me Lies (1968), and The Girl (1996). She also appeared in seven episodes of On the Buses between 1969 and 1972 . and the ITV drama London's Burning
