= Golden Fleece Ltd. =

Golden Fleece Ltd. also known as The Composers' Chamber Theater is an American arts organization specializing in the commissioning and presentation of contemporary musical compositions, operas, theatre works, and poetry. Established in the early 1970s and based in New York City, Golden Fleece Ltd. was officially incorporated a nonprofit organization in 1975. Its founders include American opera singer, playwright and composer Lou Rodgers who was awarded the Laurel Leaf Award by the American Composers Alliance in 1999. Other composers whose work has been presented by the organization include Jon Deak and Richard Peaslee.

Commissioned productions of works by new American composers have occurred annually since the mid 1980s. The company also presents two annual series of evening performances. The Argonaut Series features works by contemporary playwrights and poets while the Square One Series features works by contemporary composers. Most of the works presented by the organization are original, but it has also presented revivals of works such as Deak's Owl In Love that been had previously premiered at the New York Philharmonic.
