= Peg + Cat =

Animated children's TV series

- Genre: Children's television series; Preschool; Educational
- Created by: Jennifer Oxley; Billy Aronson
- Directed by: Cory Bobiak
- Voices of: Hayley Faith Negrin; Dwayne Hill
- Opening theme: "Peg + Cat Theme Song"
- Ending theme: "Peg + Cat Theme Song" (instrumental)
- Composers: J. Walter Hawkes; Martin Erskine; D. D. Jackson
- Countries of origin: United States; Canada
- Original language: English
- No. of seasons: 2
- No. of episodes: 64 (126 segments)

Production
- Executive producers: Jennifer Oxley; Billy Aronson; Vince Commisso; Kevin Morrison
- Running time: 28 minutes
- Production companies: Feline Features, LLC; Fred Rogers Productions; 9 Story Media Group; 9ate7 Productions

Original release
- Network: PBS Kids (United States); Treehouse TV (Canada)
- Release: October 7, 2013 – April 23, 2018

Peg + Cat is an animated children's television series based on the children's picture book "The Chicken Problem", which was published in 2012. The series, which featured the voice acting of Hayley Faith Negrin and Dwayne Hill, was created by Billy Aronson and Jennifer Oxley and produced by Fred Rogers Productions and 9 Story Media Group. It debuted on most PBS stations on October 7, 2013, as part of the revamped PBS Kids brand, and aired 64 episodes through April 23, 2018. In Canada, the show is broadcast on Treehouse TV.

The show is targeted to children 3 to 5 years old. The goal is to "inspire preschoolers’ natural curiosity about math and help them develop new skills and strategies for solving problems creatively in their daily lives". In keeping with the math theme, the animation is presented as if it were drawn on graph paper.

On March 3, 2015, PBS Kids renewed Peg + Cat for a second season, which started on April 4, 2016. On March 28, 2016, a one-hour film aired on PBS Kids. A new film, titled Peg + Cat Save the World, focused on the duo being called upon by the President of the United States (voiced by Sandra Oh), to prevent a global disaster. On March 14, 2016, PBS Kids released the first part of the film on its YouTube channel.

== Characters ==
- Peg – The main character, together with her talking cat, Cat. She is a young girl who wears a red hat and a blue dress. She explains the situation in each episode directly to the "camera", announces when they have "a big problem", and reasons out solutions to math-related problems. During songs, she pulls out a ukulele and plays it. She has a special blue marble hidden under her hat. Her favorite crayon is "little bluey". She is voiced by Hayley Faith Negrin.
- Cat – An anthropomorphic indigo cat whose best friend is Peg. He loves circles and accompanies Peg on her adventures. Cat often inspires Peg to realize a solution to a problem without being aware of it himself. Often helps to calm Peg when she is "totally freaking out". He was inspired by Jennifer Oxley's pet cat. He is voiced by Dwayne Hill.
- Ramone – A boy who shows up to help Peg and Cat with their math problems. He is voiced by Thamela Mpumlwana in season 1 and Jaiden Lewis in season 2.
- Pig – A pig who is usually silent except when he sings in a rich operatic tenor. His favorite shape is the triangle. Voiced by Tommy Wazelle.
- Neighbor Ladies – A female African American character named Viv and a female Asian American character named Connie appear in several episodes. They often accidentally add to Peg and Cat's problems by trying to be nice. Viv is voiced by Angela Teek and Connie is voiced by Jean Yoon.
- 100 Chickens – Chickens who play and live on a farm and travel to space with Pig, Peg, and Cat. Voiced by Rob Morrison and Carys Casucci.
- The Pirates and their parrot – A quarrelsome quartet of pirates who live on an island. They like to sing in four-part harmony but sing "really bad" when they get cranky. They have had a sleepover with Peg and Cat. Voiced by Rob Morrison.
- Big Mouth – A blue, furry, horned space monster who likes to eat things that are little and yellow.
- Richard – A space alien from the purple planet who plays with Peg and Cat in space. He worries a lot and often cries during tense situations. Voiced by Christian DiStefano.
- The Teens – Three cool older kids who love pizza and texting on their phones, but can't stand getting dirt on their clothes. Tessa (voiced by Addison Holley) is thirteen, Mora (voiced by Annick Obonsawin) is fourteen, and Jesse (voiced by Gabriel Giammaria) is fifteen.
- Giants – Peg and Cat's big friends who live up the Beanstalk in Fairy Tale Land. In The Giant Problem Peg and Cat think that the Giants are going to eat them. Voiced by Bryce Kulak (Giant) and Shoshana Sperling (Giantess).
- Mermaid – A swimming damsel who lives in the Magical Forest. The Pig stole her Golden Pyramids in The Golden Pyramid Problem. She is voiced by Emilie-Claire Barlow.
- The Three Bears, The Three Pigs, The Three Billy Goats Gruff – Nine Friends of Peg and Cat that get into bands like The Electric Eleven. Voiced by Kevin Brathwaite (Papa Bear), Angela Teek (Mama Bear), Phatt Al (Baby Bear), and Rob Morrison (Three Little Pigs and Three Billy Goats Gruff).
- The Blockettes – Five dancers that dance in the Radio City Music Hall. Voiced by Allie Hughes, Jennifer Wallis, and Katie Griffin.
- Mac – A gruff-voiced man who works various jobs in different episodes. Voiced by Kevin Del Aguila.
- Peg's Mom – Voiced by Alison Jutzi.
- The Seven Dwarves – Voiced by Rob Morrison.
- Dragon – A mythical creature who lives in the Magical Forest.
- Ludwig van Beethoven – A famous music composer who has problems writing music. Voiced by Rob Morrison.
- George Washington – The first president of the United States. Voiced by Kyle McDonald.
- Albert Einstein – A famous scientist. Voiced by John Stocker.
- Flat Woman – A supervillainess who likes to make things flat. Voiced by Julie Lemieux.
- Baby Fox – A young little fox who likes building his block tower and stays with Mrs. Sheep.
- Romeo and Juliet – Two young lovers from William Shakespeare's stage play of the same name.
- Triceratops – An adult blue dinosaur who talks. Randomly says "Horn!" during the conversation.
- Baby T. rex – A baby dinosaur with a voracious appetite who can't talk but instead shrieks. Seen frequently with Triceratops.
- Cleopatra – Peg + Cat's Queen of the Nile friend, along with her pet camel "Epidermis". Voiced by Patience Mpumlwana.
- Marie Curie – Voiced by Linda Ballantyne.
- Roxanne – A pink French cat. Voiced by Paula McNeil
- Grandmom and Granddad – Peg's grandparents who are obsessed with the 1960s. Voiced respectfully by Judy Marshack and Jim Codrington.
- The President of the United States – Voiced by Sandra Oh.
- Robin Hood – A robin loosely based on the British folklore hero of the same name.
- Aki – A ninja in training. Voiced by Mika Shimozato.
- Billie Holiday – A famous jazz singer.

== Episodes ==
=== Series overview ===
Season	Episodes	Originally released	
Season	Episodes	First released	Last released
1	40	October 7, 2013	September 10, 2015
Special	1	December 17, 2014	December 17, 2014
2	24	April 4, 2016	April 23, 2018

=== Season 1 (2013–15) ===
No. overall	No. in season	Title	Original release date	Prod. code
1	1	"The Chicken Problem / The Space Creature Problem"	October 7, 2013	101
The Chicken Problem: When one hundred chickens are left loose around the farm, they must round them all back in the coop before the farmer finds out. The Space Creature Problem: On the Purple Planet, Peg and Cat hang out with their alien friend Richard. However, when the chickens run around loose, the team must round them back up again in the rocket ship before a blue fuzzy creature named Big Mouth gets them first.
2	2	"The Pirate Problem/The Sleepover Problem"	October 8, 2013	103
The Pirate Problem: Peg and Cat are tasked with helping a group of cranky pirates learn how to share things fairly. The Sleepover Problem: The pirates have a sleepover with Peg and Cat, but when they can't get to sleep, the duo must help them.
3	3	"The Three Bears Problem/The Giant Problem"	October 9, 2013	104
The Three Bears Problem: In Fairytale Village, while the duo hangs out with the Three Bears who play saxophones, they must help other fairytale characters find another person for their group. Eventually, they all work together to form a band called "The Electric Eleven". The Giant Problem: The Electric Eleven are stuck in the home of two giants and have to escape and return back to the surface safely.
4	4	"The Circus Problem/The Buried Treasure Problem"	October 10, 2013	105
The Circus Problem: When Peg and Cat watch a circus act, a monkey swoops in and sends them to the center of the stage, so the duo must perform circus tricks to entertain the audience. The Buried Treasure Problem: With a map, Peg and Cat embark on a treasure hunt to find buried treasure, but the Neighbor Ladies keep preventing them from finishing their hunt with their interruptions.
5	5	"The Tree Problem/Another Tree Problem"	October 14, 2013	107
The Tree Problem: When Cat gets stuck in a tree, Peg must find a way to get him down from there. Another Tree Problem: Cat ends up getting stuck in a tree again! But without the tools Peg used the last time she used to rescue him with, she must find a different method to get him down.
6	6	"The Messy Room Problem/The Golden Pyramid Problem"	October 15, 2013	102
The Messy Room Problem: The duo works together to help clean up Peg's room by using sorting techinques. The Golden Pyramid Problem: In a different settings, knights Peg the Bold and Sir Cat the Brave help a mermaid in distress retrieve her golden pyramids back.
7	7	"The Parade Problem/The Halloween Problem"	October 22, 2013	113
The Parade Problem: When the park is swarmed with trash, the duo must work together to clean up the mess in order to save the parade. The Halloween Problem: It's Halloween, so Peg, Cat and their friend Richard go trick-or-treating, but a wild tiger left loose mistakes Richard for a real tiger.
8	8	"The Dinosaur Problem/The Beethoven Problem"	November 4, 2013	108
The Dinosaur Problem: In the time of the dinosaurs, Peg & Cat, a Brontosaurus, a Triceratops and a Stegosaurus are on the run from a baby Tyrannosaurus Rex. The Beethoven Problem: Peg and Cat help Ludwing von Beethoven create a symphony for the king before he arrives.
9	9	"The Honey Problem/The Penguin Problem"	November 5, 2013	109
The Honey Problem: Peg and Cat work in a restaurant and are tasked with bringing in buckets of honey from a beehive after the customers demand and crave honey cake. The Penguin Problem: Peg and Cat coach a group of skiing penguins to help then win a skiing race by using over, under and in-between tactics.
10	10	"The Race Car Problem/The Big Gig Problem"	November 18, 2013	110
The Race Car Problem: The duo enters a race car driving competition in hopes to win a trophy. The Big Gig Problem: The Electric Eleven is playing in their first music gig, but when most of the band quits, the two must round them back.
11	11	"The Slop Problem/The Birthday Present Problem"	December 16, 2013	111
The Slop Problem: When the farm animals get dirty from the mud, Peg and Cat must clean them up before the farmers find out, but however, they also have to deal with three teenagers who are hesitant to get dirty. The Birthday Present Problem: Peg and Cat must work together to get her mother a birthday present, so they travel around to collect thirty rocks.
12	12	"The Baby Problem/The Sparkling Sphere Problem"	December 17, 2013	112
The Baby Problem: The duo are tasked with babysitting a baby fox. The Sparking Sphere Problem: The wizard Ramone is stuck in a sparking bubble, so Peg the Bold and Sir Cat the Brave embark on a quest to save him.
13	13	"The Birthday Cake Problem/The Doohickey Problem"	January 3, 2014	106
The Birthday Cake Problem: Peg, Cat and Ramone make a birthday cake for a teenager who's turning 16. The Doohickey Problem: When Peg and Cat are missing a bunch of doohickeys for their spaceship, they and Richard help get them all back.
14	14	"The Blockette Problem/The Tulip Problem"	January 24, 2014	114
The Blockette Problem: At Radio City Music Hall, Richard is tasked with directing a show with a group of Blockettes, so Peg and Cat help him complete the task. The Tulip Problem: Peg and Cat must help two frustrated Neighbor Ladies with their flower problems.
15	15	"The Mega Mall Problem/The Cleopatra Problem"	February 17, 2014	115
The Mega Mall Problem: Peg and Cat must find the three teenagers in order to participate in a dance competition. The Cleopatra Problem: In Egypt, the duo hangs out with Cleopatra and her pet camel Epidermis. But when Peg loses her marble, the group sets out to find it.
16	16	"Yet Another Tree Problem/The Romeo and Juliet Problem"	April 14, 2014	116
Yet Another Tree Problem: This time, Peg gets stuck in a tree, so Cat must find a way to get her down. The Romeo and Juilet Problem: In Itaty, Peg and Cat hang out with Romeo, who help him get to Juilet.
17	17	"The Arch Villain Problem/The Straight and Narrow Problem"	May 5, 2014	120
The Arch Villain Problem: Peg (as Super Peg) and Cat (as Cat Guy) are superheroes and must stop a bad guy called the Arch Villain who keeps turning many things into the shape of arches. The Straight and Narrow Problem: Peg and Cat must save the day again when an unknown villain cuts things into triangles. In the end, it is revealed that the villain is named Trianglo.
18	18	"The Play Date Problem/The Blabberwocky Problem"	May 6, 2014	122
The Play Date Problem: Peg and Cat must find different ways to solve conflicts between the Three Bears and Ludwig von Beethoven when they both want to do things their own way. The Blabberwocky Problem: When an unknown creature nicknamed the Blabberwocky keeps stealing shapes around the town, Peg the Bold and Sir Cat the Brave set out to solve the mystery and retrieve back the shapes.
19	19	"The Perfect Ten Problem/The Long Line Problem"	May 7, 2014	117
The Perfect Ten Problem: Peg and Cat are judges on a show called "The Perfect Ten", and they must find a way to give out the scores that are equal to ten to make it fair. The Long Line Problem: Peg and Cat help a sad, but destined Richard get first in a line to buy a product.
20	20	"The Clown Problem/The Ninja Problem"	May 8, 2014	121
The Clown Problem: Peg and Cat teach Mac on how to be funny like a clown with the rule-of-three tactic. The Ninja Problem: When fifteen cherry blossom trees go missing, Peg, Cat and their friend Aki become ninjas and set out to retrieve them back.
21	21	"The George Washington Problem/The High Noon Problem"	July 4, 2014	125
The George Washington Problem: Peg and Cat help guide George Washington and his crew venture the Delaware River. The High Noon Problem: In the Wild West, cowboys Peg and Cat must protect the citizens and save the town from a bad guy named Back Jack who has a habit of tickling the innocent with his feather.
22	22	"The Big Dog Problem/The Three Friends Problem"	July 14, 2014	119
The Big Dog Problem: Peg and Cat are tasked with sending the mail to their mailbox, but a problem rises with their path is blocked by a big dog. The Three Friends Problem: Hanging out with the big dog, Peg must figure out what's wrong with Cat when he suddenly becomes jealous and quiet.
23	23	"The Pizza Problem/The Pizza Pirate Problem"	August 18, 2014	126
The Pizza Problem: Peg and Cat are tasked to serve halves of pizza to a bunch of customers, all while keeping them happy. The Pizza Pirate Problem: The team must deliver a bunch of pizzas to their friends, but the pirates want to take away one of the pizzas from the orders.
24	24	"The Potty Problem/The Butter Problem"	August 19, 2014	127
The Potty Problem: After a little accident when Big Mouth accidentally goes on Viv's carpet, Peg and Cat help him learn to use the potty with six easy steps so that he can stay with them. The Butter Problem: Peg and Cat must complete farm chores and sculpt a butter statue by using diagrams.
25	25	"The Pirate Puzzle Problem/The Scrap of Map Problem"	August 20, 2014	128
The Pirate Puzzle Problem: When the pirates argue and bicker with one another during Peg and Cat's pirate playdate — which would then lead the map for the treasure getting ripped into different pieces — the two help the four pirates teach them that they fit together as a team. The Scrap of Map Problem: In this sung-through musical episode, following the events of "The Pirate Puzzle Problem", Peg & Cat and their friends each find a piece of a treasure map and embark on a group treasure hunt.
26	26	"The Sushi Problem/The Highlight Zone Problem"	August 21, 2014	129
The Sushi Problem: Peg, Cat and Aki must retrieve the stolen sushi back from an unknown creature before the banquet starts. The Highlight Zone Problem: Peg and Cat enter a new dimension called "The Highlight Zone", where some things seems out of the ordinary. They must find 10 differences in order to return back home.
27	27	"The Election Problem/The Littlest Chicken Problem"	November 3, 2014	123
The Election Problem: The Farmer holds an election between Peg & Cat and the Pig in order to see who is the most trustworthy in watching his one hundred chickens. The Littlest Chicken Problem: Peg and Cat follow the Littlest Chicken around Fairytale Land as she tries to find the perfect family her own size.
28	28	"The Flat Woman Problem/The Hanukkah Problem"	December 18, 2014	136
The Flat Woman Problem: When a new super-villain named Flat Woman teams up with Triangulo and causes mayhem all around Mathropolis, it's up to the superhero duo to stop the madness. The Hanukkah Problem: Peg, Cat and their friends hang out with their friend Albert Einstein to spend Hanukkah with him. But when a baby bird and a squirrel family bicker with one another, it's up to them to restore peace to save the holiday.
29	29	"The Christmas Problem"	December 22, 2014	118
When Santa Claus gets sent away in a rocket ship, it's up to Peg and Cat to save Christmas!
30	30	"The Allergy Problem/I Do What I Can: The Musical"	March 2, 2015	132
The Allergy Problem: After being told that Peg is allergic to cats, Cat himself runs away from home! So it's up to her and Ramone to set out and find him. In the end, it's revealed that she's allergic to four-leaf clovers. I Do What I Can: The Musical: Peg and Cat present a musical starring Ramone and how he became a hero and friend to all by doing his good deeds.
31	31	"The Roxanne Problem/The Girl Group Problem"	March 3, 2015	134
32	32	"The Groovy Sixties Problem/Bad Jack Is Back"	March 4, 2015	137
33	33	"The Magic Uke/The Rocking Out Problem"	March 5, 2015	139
34	34	"The Cold Camel Problem/The Einstein Problem"	April 3, 2015	130
35	35	"The T-Ball Problem/The Bus Problem"	June 1, 2015	138
36	36	"Richard The Third/The Lemonade Problem"	August 5, 2015	135
37	37	"The Wonderland Problem/The Bat Mitzvah Problem"	September 7, 2015	131
38	38	"The Robin Hood Problem/The Owl and the Pussy Cat Problem"	September 8, 2015	140
39	39	"The Ring Problem/The Wedding Problem"	September 9, 2015	124
40	40	"The Bermuda Triangle Problem/The Breeze in the Branches"	September 10, 2015	133

=== Special (2014) ===
No. overall	No. in season	Title	Original release date	Prod. code
1	1	"Peg + Cat + Holidays"	December 17, 2014	TBA

=== Season 2 (2016–18) ===
No. overall	No. in season	Title	Original release date	Prod. code
41	1	"Peg + Cat Save the World"	March 28, 2016	201-202
Peg and Cat are called upon by the President of the United States (voiced by Sandra Oh) to prevent a global disaster.
42	2	"The Polka Dot Planet Problem/The Mardi Gras Problem"	April 4, 2016	203
43	3	"The Mermaid in the Mall Problem/The Painting Problem"	April 5, 2016	203
44	4	"The Claymation Problem/The Grumpy Judge Problem"	April 6, 2016	204
45	5	"The Imaginary Friend Problem/The Promise Problem"	April 7, 2016	207
46	6	"The Camp Problem/The Two Homes Problem"	July 4, 2016	206
47	7	"The Tree By the Nile Problem/The Eid al-Adha Adventure"	September 12, 2016	214
48	8	"The Pentagirls Problem/The Tree Problem of National Importance"	October 4, 2016	219
49	9	"The Package Problem/The Train Problem"	October 11, 2016	205
50	10	"The Poetry Problem/The Disappearing Art Problem"	October 12, 2016	212
Peg meets Emily Dickinson.
51	11	"The Friday the 13th Problem/The Looking Glass Problem"	October 13, 2016	220
52	12	"Another Train Problem/The Odd Sea"	October 14, 2016	216
53	13	"The Dance Problem/Follow The Bouncing Ball"	October 19, 2016	217
54	14	"Peg Meets Cat/The Valentine's Day Problem"	February 1, 2017	211
55	15	"The Too Big Dog Problem/The Giant Baby Problem"	June 5, 2017	210
56	16	"The Funky Seventies Problem/The Umbrella Problem"	June 6, 2017	218
57	17	"The Fuzzball Problem/The Silliest Song Problem"	June 7, 2017	222
58	18	"The Sam Problem/Mac the Fork"	June 8, 2017	223
59	19	"The Pig Problem/The Mariachi Problem"	September 15, 2017	221
60	20	"The Peanut Problem/More Adventures of Robin Hood"	January 8, 2018	215
61	21	"The Awards Show Problem/The Wrong Headed Problem"	February 26, 2018	213
62	22	"The Hotel Problem/Another Hotel Problem"	February 27, 2018	225
63	23	"The Big Dig Problem/The Crayon Problem"	February 28, 2018	226
64	24	"The Compost Problem/Raiders of the Lost Arch"	April 23, 2018	224

== Critical reception ==
Peg + Cat has received generally positive reviews from television critics and parents of young children. Ryan Berenz of Channel Guide Magazine wrote, "Problem solved: PEG + CAT equals fun!"

== Awards ==
Peg + Cat has won seven Daytime Emmy Awards: Outstanding Pre-School Children's Animated Program, Outstanding Performer in an Animated Program (Hayley Faith Negrin), Outstanding Individual Achievement in Animation (Jennifer Oxley, production designer), Outstanding Writing in a Pre-School Animated Program (includes Peg + Cat co-creators Billy Aronson and Jennifer Oxley, Kevin Del Aguila, Dustin Ferrer, David Steven Cohen, Qui Nguyen, and writers), and Outstanding Music Direction and Composition (Steven Rebollido, music supervisor; J. Walter Hawkes, music director; and Martin Erskine and D. D. Jackson, composers).

== Merchandise ==
In late 2016, Fred Rogers Productions and 9 Story Media Group signed a deal with the Montreal-based toy manufacturer Imports Dragon to create an assortment of plush, arts-and-crafts sets, games and wooden puzzles based on the Peg + Cat characters.

The toys join numerous books from Candlewick Press, as well as DVDs from PBS Distribution in the U.S., eOne in Canada, ABC Commercial in Australia and Sony Music in Germany.
