= Sophie Elgort =

American photographer (b. 1986)

- Born: 1986 (age 38–39); New York City
- Education: Brown University
- Occupations: Photographer, director, producer, host
- Parents: Arthur Elgort (father); Grethe Holby (mother)
- Relatives: Ansel Elgort (brother); Warren Elgort (brother)
- Website: www.sophieelgort.com

Sophie Elgort (born 1986) is an American photographer, director, producer, and host. She is known for her fashion and portrait photography, working with Brooke Shields, Elizabeth Olsen, John Waters, Naomi Watts, Rose Byrne, and more. Her work has been featured in Vogue, The New York Times, Elle, and other publications.

In 2025, she became the host of the PBS series Portrait Mode with Sophie Elgort, a show that explores the creative process behind photoshoots with public figures.

== Early life and education ==
Elgort was born in New York City to fashion photographer Arthur Elgort and opera director Grethe Barrett Holby. She has two brothers, filmmaker Warren Elgort and actor and singer Ansel Elgort. Sophie Elgort developed an interest in photography at a young age, watching her father, Arthur Elgort, at work. She earned a Bachelor of Arts degree from Brown University in 2008.

== Career ==
Elgort began her career photographing and interviewing professionals on the streets of New York for Suits and the City, a column in The Financial Times that she co-created.

Her works later appeared in publications such as Vogue, The New York Times, Cultured, Elle, Glamour, Paper, Teen Vogue, The Financial Times, Vogue Greece, Vogue Thailand, and Harper's Bazaar Turkey. She has collaborated with fashion brands such as De Beers, Rosewood Hotels, Victoria's Secret, Alice + Olivia, Adidas, Maybelline and others.

Her portrait subjects have included Brooke Shields, Elizabeth Olsen, John Waters, Naomi Watts, Rose Byrne, Hilary Swank, Bowen Yang, Kylie and Kendall Jenner, and Rosario Dawson.

Elgort is also a host, moderator, and interviewer, having participated in live events, television, and digital media. She has been a guest judge for The All American High School Film Festival and the Miss USA Pageant, and has moderated discussions at institutions such as the Rubin Museum of Art, Brooklyn Academy of Music (BAM), Barnard College, Pratt Institute, and Brown University.

In 2016, Sophie Elgort was recognized in Forbes' 30 Under 30 list. She was also included in The Daily Front Row's list of "12 New Wave Creatives Moving Fashion Forward".

Her fine art photography is exhibited at the Staley-Wise Gallery.

From May to August 2023, her solo show, AWAY WE GO, inspired by postcards and the spirit of travel, was exhibited at the Lafayette 148 retail spaces in New York and Los Angeles.

In 2025, Elgort became the host and executive producer of Portrait Mode with Sophie Elgort, a PBS series produced by All Arts. The show features behind-the-scenes footage of photo shoots with public figures, exploring their creative processes. The first season includes guests such as musician Nile Rodgers, actress Rita Moreno, photographer Arthur Elgort, and ballet dancer Skylar Brandt. The series premiered in February 2025.

== Public activity ==
Elgort serves as a board member of the Southampton Fresh Air Home, a nonprofit center that provides recreational and educational programs for children and young adults with physical disabilities. She co-chaired the Public Art Fund After Party in 2025. During the COVID-19 pandemic, she created the Mask Portrait Series, photographing and interviewing individuals to document their experiences during the crisis. The series was profiled on NY1.
