= US (play) =

1966 play by Denis Cannan

US is a 1966 experimental theatre play created for the Royal Shakespeare Company by a group that included Denis Cannan (writer), Michael Kustow (documentary), Sally Jacobs (design), Richard Peaslee (music), Adrian Mitchell (lyrics), Geoffrey Reeves (music director), Albert Hunt (associate director), Michael Stott (associate director) and director Peter Brook.

The play addresses "British metropolitan attitudes" towards the Vietnam War, rather than the facts of the war itself. The first half of the performance consists of "comic-strip…anti-Americanism", but after the interval the work considers aspects of the conflict as if taking place in London: "I want it to come here…" announces one character. This is achieved by having a player contemplate burning himself to death, in the manner of Buddhist monks in Saigon, on the streets of London. At the end of the play a box of live butterflies is released from a box with the last (actually made of paper) being picked up by the wings and symbolically burnt with a cigarette lighter.

It premiered on 13 October 1966, directed by Brook, at the Aldwych Theatre, London.

The cast included Glenda Jackson, Michael Williams, Clifford Rose and Patrick O'Connell.

Benefit of the Doubt, a documentary about the making of the play, was released in 1967. Tell Me Lies, a British film based on US and directed and produced by Brook, was released in 1968.

== See also ==
- List of plays with anti-war themes
