= Lou Rodgers =

American opera singer and opera director

Lou Rodgers is an American opera singer and opera director. A mezzo-soprano, she began her career in the late 1950s singing roles with the New York City Opera. She notably appeared in the world premiere of Hugo Weisgall's Six Characters in Search of an Author with the company on April 26, 1959. In 1975 she founded Golden Fleece Ltd., an opera company dedicated to presenting new American operas. She remains the company's artistic director to this day. For her work with the company she was awarded the prestigious Laurel Leaf Award from the American Composers Alliance in 1999.
