= Touch (ballet) =

Touch is a ballet made by David Parsons on the New York City Ballet to music by Richard Peaslee. The premiere took place February 15, 1996, at the New York State Theater, Lincoln Center.

== Original cast ==
- Stacey Calvert
- Michele Gifford
- Monique Meunier
- Teresa Reyes
- Albert Evans
- Tom Gold
- Edwaard Liang
- Damian Woetzel

== Articles and reviews ==
- Kisselgoff, Anna (February 17, 1996). "BALLET REVIEW;A Leaping, Speeding Continuum". The New York Times.
- Kisselgoff, Anna (March 3, 1996). "DANCE VIEW;In Pace With Its Time: Fast, Complex, Like a Computer". The New York Times.
- NY Times review by Jennifer Dunning, June 25, 1996
