= Ansel Elgort =

American actor and singer (born 1994)

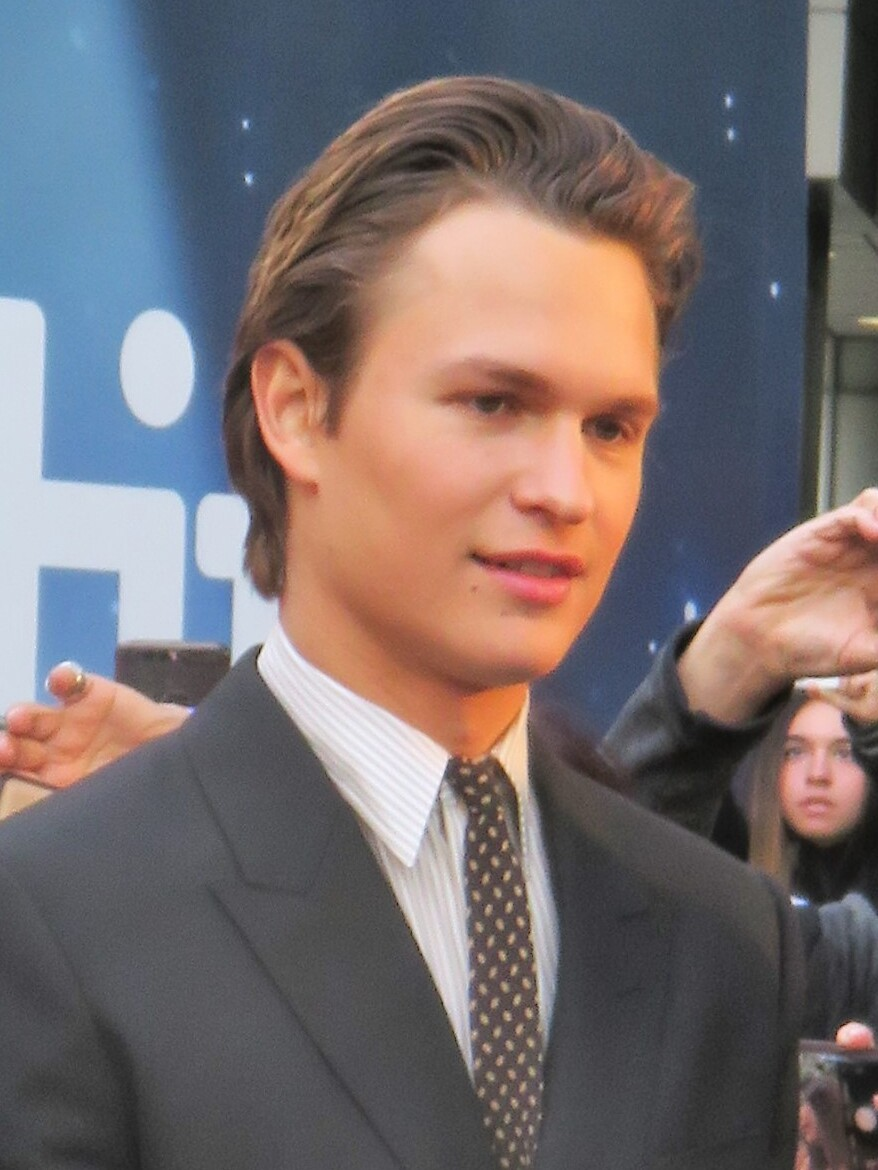
- Elgort in 2019
- Born: March 14, 1994 (age 32); New York City, U.S.
- Occupations: Actor; singer
- Years active: 2012–present
- Children: 1
- Parents: Arthur Elgort (father); Grethe Barrett Holby (mother)
- Relatives: Sophie Elgort (sister); Sam Morril (cousin)
- Musical career
- Also known as: Ansølo
- Genres: Hip-hop; R&B; soul; electronic
- Instruments: Vocals; turntables
- Label: Island/Universal (2015–present)

Ansel Elgort (born March 14, 1994) is an American actor and singer. He began his acting career with a supporting role in the horror film Carrie (2013). He gained wider recognition for starring as a teenage cancer patient in the romantic drama film The Fault in Our Stars (2014) and for his supporting role in The Divergent Series (2014–2016).

In 2017, Elgort played the title character in Edgar Wright's action thriller Baby Driver, for which he received a Golden Globe Award nomination for Best Actor in a Motion Picture – Musical or Comedy. After starring in Steven Spielberg's musical film West Side Story (2021), he portrayed Jake Adelstein in the crime series Tokyo Vice from 2022 to 2024.

== Early life ==
Ansel Elgort was born in New York City on March 14, 1994. His parents are Arthur Elgort, a fashion photographer who has worked extensively for Vogue magazine, and Grethe Barrett Holby, an opera director. Elgort's father named him after prominent nature photographer Ansel Adams (1902–1984). Ansel is of Russian Jewish descent on his father's side, and of Norwegian, English and German ancestry on his mother's. Elgort's Norwegian maternal grandmother, Aase-Grethe, was in the Norwegian resistance during World War II and saved Norwegian Jewish children by moving them into neutral Sweden; because of these activities, she was imprisoned in a concentration camp.

Elgort has two older siblings: sister Sophie Elgort, a fashion photographer, and brother Warren Elgort, a cinematographer. He is a cousin of comedian Sam Morril, who is the son of his paternal uncle. At age nine, Elgort auditioned for the School of American Ballet, and studied there for five years.

Elgort attended Trinity School, The Professional Performing Arts School, Fiorello H. LaGuardia High School, and Stagedoor Manor summer camp. He started taking acting classes at age 12 and at LaGuardia, where he performed in a rendition of Hairspray with schoolmate Kyle Jean-Baptiste and starred in the school's productions of Guys and Dolls. During high school, in 2009, he appeared in Teen Vogue alongside Polish model Jac Jagaciak in an editorial photographed by his father.

== Career ==
=== Acting ===
Elgort's first professional acting appearance was a few months before graduating high school, just days after his 18th birthday, when he premiered a lead role in an Off-Broadway production of Regrets in March 2012. His film debut was in the 2013 remake of Carrie, in the key secondary role of the lead character's prom date. His first highly publicized role was in Divergent (2014) as Caleb Prior, the brother of the lead character, Beatrice "Tris" Prior, played by Shailene Woodley.

Immediately after the filming of Divergent was completed, it was announced that Elgort would play Augustus Waters in the film adaptation of John Green's novel The Fault in Our Stars opposite Woodley again, who would play Hazel Grace Lancaster. The film followed the story of Hazel, a teenage cancer patient, who is forced by her parents to attend a support group, where she subsequently meets and falls in love with Waters, a former basketball player. The film, directed by Josh Boone, was released on June 6, 2014. Elgort next co-starred in the dramatic film Men, Women & Children, directed by Jason Reitman and released in October 2014; it co-starred his LaGuardia classmate Timothée Chalamet.

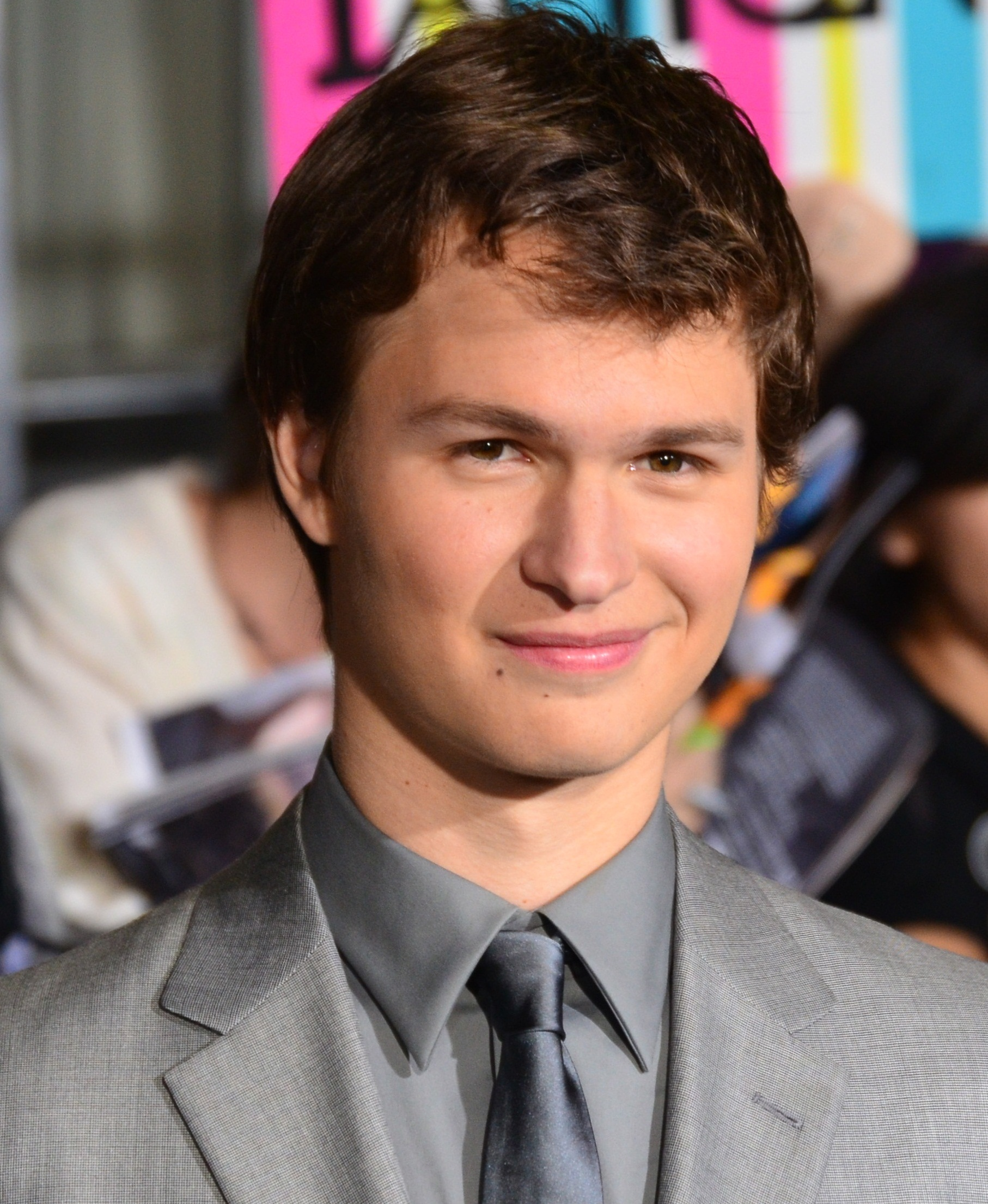
Elgort at the premiere of Divergent, 2014

In 2014, Elgort was named one of the best actors under 20 years of age. Elgort reunited with Carrie co-star Chloë Grace Moretz to present the award for Best Visual Effects at the 2015 Oscars. He also reprised his role, Caleb Prior, in The Divergent Series: Insurgent, the second film of the book series Divergent, which was released March 20, 2015, and in the third film, The Divergent Series: Allegiant, which was released on March 18, 2016.

In 2016, Elgort was on a shortlist of actors for the role of Han Solo in Solo: A Star Wars Story. After Alden Ehrenreich was cast in May 2016, Elgort expressed some relief, saying that if he had been cast, he would have had to change his DJ name, Ansølo.

In 2017, Elgort played the title role in the action film Baby Driver, directed by Edgar Wright, and also starring Lily James and Kevin Spacey. Elgort's audition in 2014 required him to lip sync and dance to a song of his choosing. The film received positive reviews and performed well at the box office. Elgort received a nomination for the Golden Globe Award for Best Actor – Motion Picture Musical or Comedy for his performance. Also that year, he played Addison Schacht in the drama thriller film November Criminals, an adaptation of the novel of the same name, starring again with Moretz.

Elgort starred in the film Billionaire Boys Club, opposite Taron Egerton, Cary Elwes, Emma Roberts and Spacey and directed by James Cox. Due to allegations of sexual misconduct against Spacey, the future of the film was uncertain and no release date was set. The film was initially released through video on demand on July 17, 2018, prior to a limited release in theaters on August 17, 2018, by Vertical Entertainment. Elgort played the lead role in the 2019 release The Goldfinch, an adaptation of Donna Tartt's novel. The film was critically panned and a box office bomb.

Elgort played the lead role of Tony in West Side Story, an adaptation of the 1957 stage musical of the same name directed by Steven Spielberg. The film was released in 2021 to critical acclaim, and received seven nominations at the 94th Academy Awards, including Best Picture.

Elgort next starred in Tokyo Vice, a television adaptation of journalist Jake Adelstein's non-fiction memoir for HBO Max. Michael Mann and Destin Daniel Cretton directed episodes of the series, written by J.T. Rogers. Elgort played the lead role of Adelstein and served as one of the series' executive producers. Although production on the series was halted due to the COVID-19 pandemic, production resumed and the series debuted on HBO Max in 2022 to positive reviews.

=== Music ===
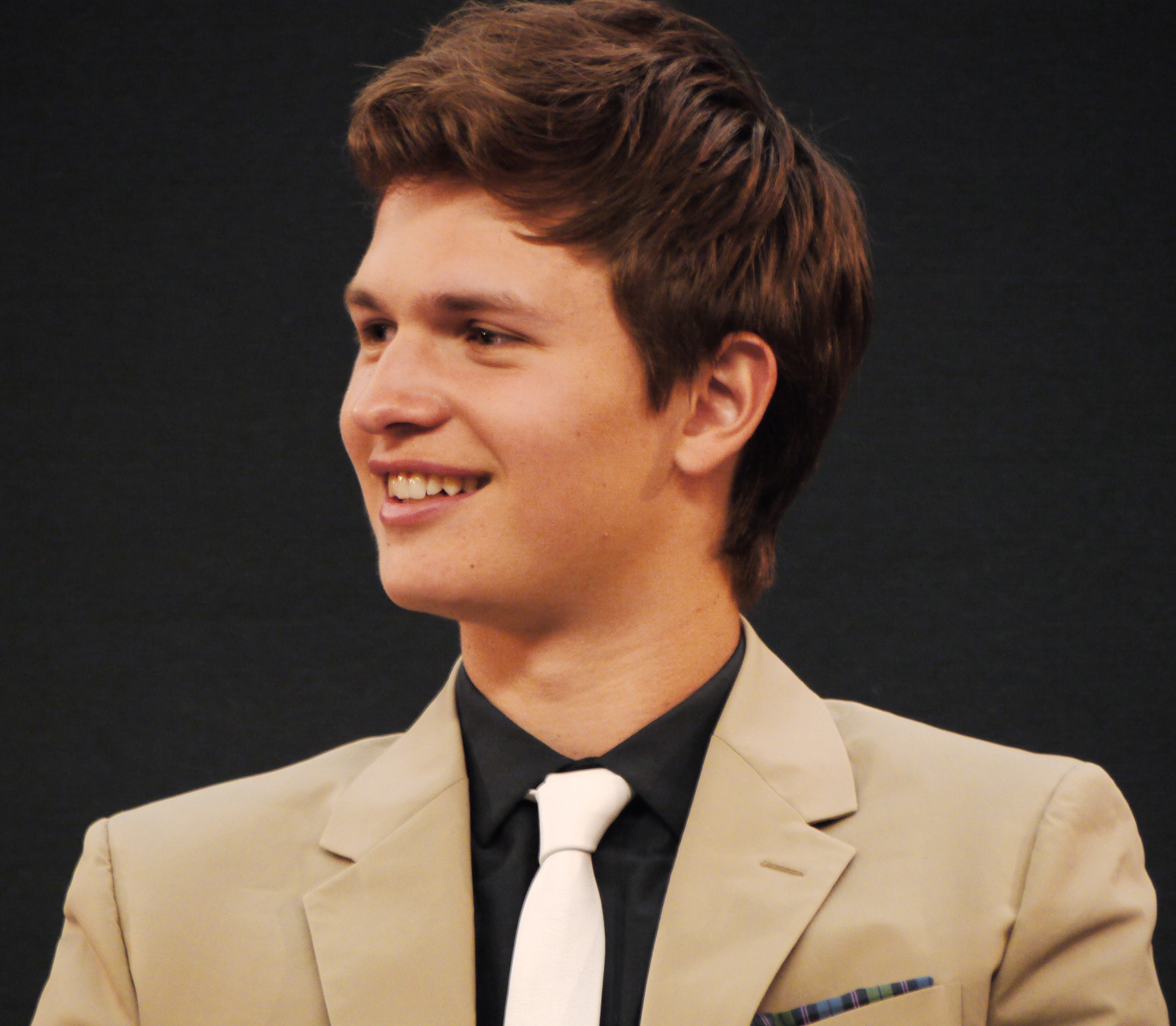
Elgort in 2014

Under the name Ansølo, Elgort created a SoundCloud account to publish electronic dance music, and he has remixed songs such as "Born to Die" by Lana Del Rey. In a livestream in February 2014, he said he had signed a record deal with Tom Staar's new label, Staar Traxx, and Steve Angello's label, Size Records.

His first record, Unite, was released on April 21, 2014, on Beatport, and May 5, 2014, on iTunes. His second record, Totem, was released July 21, 2014, on Beatport and iTunes. His single "To Life", a Bar Mitzvah-themed song inflected with klezmer music, was released in September 2015.

Elgort played at the Electric Zoo Festival main stage in 2014, the Ultra Music Festival main stage in March 2015, played in a red-light dance music event in Amsterdam in 2014, opened some The Chainsmokers shows, a Nervo show and some others shows with his friends Nicky Romero and Martin Garrix. He played his first headline show on his 21st birthday on Pacha NYC.

In 2015, he signed a record deal with Island/Universal Records, releasing his first single on the label, "Home Alone", on July 8, 2016.

On February 3, 2017, he released a single called "Thief" under the name Ansel Elgort. The music video featured his then-girlfriend Violetta Komyshan, a ballet dancer. He was featured on rapper Logic's third studio album, Everybody, released on May 5, 2017, on a song titled "Killing Spree".

On January 11, 2018, he released a single called "Supernova". He provided vocals for and was featured on Don Diablo’s 2018 single "Believe".

== Personal life ==
As of 2017 Elgort was residing in the Bedford–Stuyvesant, Brooklyn.

On his 21st birthday, Elgort asked friends, family, and fans to donate to the Thirst Project. In April 2020, he posted a nude photograph of himself on social media as part of a fundraising effort to feed those affected by COVID-19.

In June 2020, a woman known as Gabby on Twitter accused Elgort of sexually assaulting her in 2014, when she was 17 and he was 20. Following the post, three other women alleged that he had solicited them via DM when they were between the ages of 14 and 16, and another post by a French-speaking user, made in April 2020, circulated showing alleged screenshots of him soliciting her when she was 15 and he was 21. He denied the allegation by Gabby in an Instagram post, saying that he and the woman had had a "brief, legal and entirely consensual relationship".

In 2022, Elgort split from Violetta Komyshan, his girlfriend of 10 years, with whom he had been since high school.

In 2026, Elgort had his first child, a son, with his Japanese partner, Miona.

== Filmography ==
=== Film ===
| Year | Title | Role | Notes |
|---|---|---|---|
| 2013 | Carrie | Thomas "Tommy" Ross | |
| 2014 | Divergent | Caleb Prior | |
| 2014 | The Fault in Our Stars | Augustus Waters | |
| 2014 | Men, Women & Children | Tim Mooney | |
| 2015 | Paper Towns | Mason | Cameo |
| 2015 | The Divergent Series: Insurgent | Caleb Prior | |
| 2016 | The Divergent Series: Allegiant | Caleb Prior | |
| 2017 | Baby Driver | Baby / Miles | |
| 2017 | November Criminals | Addison Schacht | |
| 2018 | Jonathan | Jonathan / John | |
| 2018 | Billionaire Boys Club | Joe Hunt | |
| 2019 | The Goldfinch | Theodore "Theo" Decker | |
| 2021 | West Side Story | Tony | |
| TBA | Dinner with Audrey | Hubert de Givenchy | Post-production |

=== Television ===
| Year | Title | Role | Notes |
|---|---|---|---|
| 2022–2024 | Tokyo Vice | Jake Adelstein | Also executive producer |

== Discography ==
=== Singles ===
| Title | Year | Album |
|---|---|---|
Credited as Ansolo
| "Unite" (with Special Features) | 2014 | Non-album singles |
| "Totem" (with Tom Staar) | 2014 | Non-album singles |
| "The Right Stuff" (with Jerm) | 2015 | Non-album singles |
| "To Life" (with Too Many Zooz) | 2015 | Non-album singles |
| "Yin Yang" (with Maxum) | 2016 | Non-album singles |
Credited as Ansel Elgort
| "Home Alone" | 2016 | Non-album singles |
| "Thief" | 2017 | Non-album singles |
| "You Can Count on Me" (featuring Logic) | 2017 | Non-album singles |
| "All I Think About Is You" | 2017 | Non-album singles |
| "Supernova" | 2018 | Non-album singles |
| "Balcony Scene (Tonight)" (with Rachel Zegler) | 2021 | West Side Story: Original Motion Picture Soundtrack |

=== Remixes ===
| Title | Original artists | Year | Album |
|---|---|---|---|
| "Clarity" (Ansolo Remix) | Zedd featuring Foxes | 2013 | Non-album singles |
| "Runaway" (Ansolo Remix) | Pierce Fulton | 2014 | Non-album singles |
| "Strong" (Ansolo Remix) | Arno Cost & Norman Doray | 2014 | Non-album singles |
| "Runaway (U & I)" (Ansolo Remix) | Galantis | 2015 | Runaway (U & I) [Remixes] – Single |
| "I Wanna Know" (Ansolo Remix) | Alesso featuring Nico & Vinz | 2016 | I Wanna Know (feat. Nico & Vinz) [The Remixes] – Single |

=== As featured artist ===
| Title | Year | Album |
|---|---|---|
Credited as Ansel Elgort
| "Killing Spree" (Logic feat. Ansel Elgort) | 2017 | Everybody |
| "Believe" (Don Diablo feat. Ansel Elgort) | 2018 | Future |
| "Something's Coming" "Maria" "Balcony Scene (Tonight)" "One Hand, One Heart" "Cool" "Tonight (Quintet)" | 2021 | West Side Story: Original Motion Picture Soundtrack |

=== Music videos ===
| Artist | Title | Year | Director(s) | Notes | Ref. |
|---|---|---|---|---|---|
| Dua Lipa | "Be the One" | 2016 | Daniel Kaufman | Guest appearance | |
| Ansel Elgort | "Thief" | 2017 | Warren Elgort | | |
| Ansel Elgort | "Supernova" | 2018 | Colin Tilley | | |
| JID | "Off da Zoinkys" | 2019 | Scott Lazer | | |

== Awards and nominations ==
| Year | Award | Work | Result | Ref. |
|---|---|---|---|---|
| 2014 | Choice Movie: Liplock (shared with Shailene Woodley) | The Fault in Our Stars | Won | |
| 2014 | Choice Movie: Chemistry (shared with Shailene Woodley and Nat Wolff) | The Fault in Our Stars | Won | |
| 2014 | Fan Favorite Actor – Male | The Fault in Our Stars / Divergent | Won | |
| 2014 | Breakthrough Actor | The Fault in Our Stars / Divergent | Nominated | |
| 2014 | Best On-Screen Couple (shared with Shailene Woodley) | The Fault in Our Stars | Won | |
| 2014 | Best New Film Actor | The Fault in Our Stars | Won | |
| 2015 | Favorite Movie Duo (shared with Shailene Woodley) | The Fault in Our Stars | Nominated | |
| 2015 | Best Young Actor/Actress | The Fault in Our Stars | Nominated | |
| 2015 | Best Male Performance | The Fault in Our Stars | Nominated | |
| 2015 | Breakthrough Performance | The Fault in Our Stars | Nominated | |
| 2015 | Best Shirtless Performance | The Fault in Our Stars | Nominated | |
| 2015 | Best Kiss (shared with Shailene Woodley) | The Fault in Our Stars | Won | |
| 2015 | Best Duo (shared with Shailene Woodley) | The Fault in Our Stars | Nominated | |
| 2015 | Choice Movie Actor: Action | The Divergent Series: Insurgent | Nominated | |
| 2017 | Golden Globe Award for Best Actor – Motion Picture Musical or Comedy | Baby Driver | Nominated | |
| 2018 | Empire Award for Best Male Newcomer | Baby Driver | Nominated | |
| 2018 | MTV Movie Award for Best Performance in a Movie | Baby Driver | Nominated | |
