= Peter Sliker =

American opera singer (1925–2010)

Peter Sliker (June 7, 1925 – June 25, 2010) was an American operatic bass-baritone who had a lengthy career performing at the Metropolitan Opera from 1961 through 1989. He specialized in portraying comprimario roles and was admired for his comic timing. He has appeared on several Live from the Metropolitan Opera broadcasts and Metropolitan Opera radio broadcasts.

== Early life and education ==
Born in Jersey City, New Jersey, to Harry and Ella Sliker, Sliker started studying music at a young age and began singing on local radio programs at the age of 7. After graduating from Henry Snyder High School, he enlisted in the United States Navy in 1942. He spent the majority of World War II serving in the Mumansk Run in the Northern part of the Atlantic Ocean. After the war, he took a job as a purser for the United States Lines shipping company; notably serving on the SS United States when it captured the trans-Atlantic speed record on 4 July 1952. In 1948 he married Myra Warren whom he later divorced.

While working for the United States Line, Sliker pursued university studies; first at Rutgers University and then Harvard University where he graduated Phi Beta Kappa with a bachelor's degree in languages in 1950. He concurrently studied music at the New England Conservatory where he graduated with a bachelor's degree in vocal performance in 1951. He then lived in Cuba for a year to study languages further, by this time already having mastered six languages.

== Singing career ==
In 1958 Sliker made his debut at Carnegie Hall in a sold out concert of Bach chamber music where he performed cantata Tritt auf die Glaubensbahn, BWV 152 under the baton of Václav Nelhýbel. He returned to the recital hall at that concert house for his New York City recital debut on March 7, 1959 where he performed a program of Bach, Joseph Haydn, and Johann Rosenmüller works. The New York Times music critic John Briggs wrote of his performance:

"Mr. Sliker revealed a resonant voice of good range and power, well in focus most of the time, smoothly and expressively handled, and with sufficient agility to negotiate the florid passages of the baroque music he performed. He made it evident that he is a performer with imagination, who understood quite well what the music on his program was about, and showed considerable skill in communicating it to his audience."

In 1959 Sliker joined the roster of singers at the New York City Opera where he appeared in a number of comprimario roles through 1961. He notably portrayed one of the Seven Deadly Sins in the world premiere of Hugo Weisgall's Six Characters in Search of an Author on April 26, 1959 and sang in the 1959 production and cast recording of Douglas Moore's The Ballad of Baby Doe with Beverly Sills in the title role. In 1960 Sliker was a soloist in a performance of Wolfgang Amadeus Mozart's Litaniae de venerabili altaris sacramento with the Boston Symphony Orchestra under conductor Hugh Ross at the Tanglewood Music Festival.

In 1961 Sliker was invited by Rudolf Bing to join the roster of singers at the Metropolitan Opera. He made his debut with the company on November 29, 1961, as one of the noblemen in Richard Wagner's Lohengrin with Sándor Kónya in the title role, Ingrid Bjoner as Elsa, Margaret Harshaw as Ortrud, Randolph Symonette as Telramund, Jerome Hines as King Heinrich, and Joseph Rosenstock conducting. He appeared annually at the Met through 1989 in a large number of character roles, including Ambrogio in The Barber of Seville, a Croupier in Manon, Forester in Don Carlo, the Gardener in La traviata, the Guard in Rigoletto, Handsome in La Fanciulla del West, Jankel in Arabella, a Lackey in Der Rosenkavalier, the Sergeant in La Bohème, the Steersman in La Gioconda, and a Villager in Pagliacci. On September 16, 1966, he appeared as the Sentinel in the world premiere of Samuel Barber's Antony and Cleopatra for the opening of the new Metropolitan Opera House with Leontyne Price as Cleopatra and Justino Díaz as Anthony. On March 18, 1977 he sang the role of the Physician in the Met's first staging of Alban Berg's Lulu with Carole Farley in the title role. His final and 509th Met appearance was as Guccio in Puccini's Gianni Schicchi on December 16, 1989, with Bruno Pola in the title role, Hei-Kyung Hong as Lauretta, and James Levine conducting.

== Later life ==
Sliker lived in retirement in Helena, Montana, at the Waterford retirement community. His last public performance was in Helena during the mid-1990s when he performed for a benefit concert at the Myrna Loy Center for the Performing and Media Arts. He died at the age of 86 in Helena and is buried at the Lower Valley Union Cemetery in Califon, New Jersey.
