= Six Characters in Search of an Author (opera) =

1959 opera by Hugo Weisgall

Six Characters in Search of an Author is an opera in three acts by composer Hugo Weisgall. The work uses an English libretto by Denis Johnston that is based on the play of the same name by Luigi Pirandello. The opera was commissioned by the New York City Opera under the leadership Julius Rudel. It premiered at New York City Center on April 26, 1959 in a production staged by William Ball and using sets and costumes designed by Gary Smith.

The work was mounted in 1990 by the Lyric Opera of Chicago's Lyric Opera Center for American Artists in 1990, a production which was recorded and released on the New World Records label. The production was conducted by Lee Schaenen and starred Kevin Anderson as The Director, Bruce Fowler as The Tennore Buffo, Andrew Schroeder as The Accompanist, Michael Wadsworth as The Basso Cantante, Philip Zawisza as The Stage Manager, Elizabeth Futral as The Coloratura, Susan Foster as The Prompter, Joslyn King as The Mezzo, Dianne Pritchett as The Wardrobe Mistress, Paula LoVerne as Madame Pace, Robert Orth as The Father, Gary Lehman as The Son, Elizabeth Byrne as The Stepdaughter, and Nancy Maultsby as The Mother.

Another professional production was mounted in 2000 at the McCarter Theater in Princeton, New Jersey for the Opera Festival of New Jersey.

Oberlin College, the Manhattan School of Music, and the University of Illinois at Urbana-Champaign mounted student productions in 1974, 1995, and 2002 respectively.

== Roles ==
Role	Voice type	Premiere cast, April 26, 1959 (Conductor: – Sylvan Levin)
The Director	tenor	Ernest McChesney
The Tenore Buffo	tenor	Grant Williams
The Accompanist	baritone	Craig Timberlake
The Basso Cantante	bass	John Macurdy
The Stage Manager	baritone	Arnold Voketaitis
The Coloratura	soprano	Beverly Sills
The Prompter	soprano	Anita Darian
The Mezzo	mezzo-soprano	Regina Sarfaty
The Wardrobe Mistress	contralto	Elizabeth Mannion
Another tenor	tenor	Anthony Balestrieri
The Father	baritone	Paul Ukena
The Son	baritone	Robert Trehy
The Stepdaughter	soprano	Adelaide Bishop
The Mother	mezzo-soprano	Patricia Neway
Madame Pace	contralto	Ruth Kobart
The Boy	speaking role	Marc Sullivan
The Child	speaking role	Barbara Becker
The Seven Deadly Sins	soprano, soprano, mezzo-soprano, contralto, tenor, baritone, bass	Mary LeSawyer, Jennie Andrea, Lou Rodgers, Rita Metzger, William Saxon, George del Monte, Peter Sliker
Chorus Mistress, Wardrobe Assistants, Carpenters, Prop Men	Opera Chorus	
