= Eric Allan =

British actor (1940–2026)

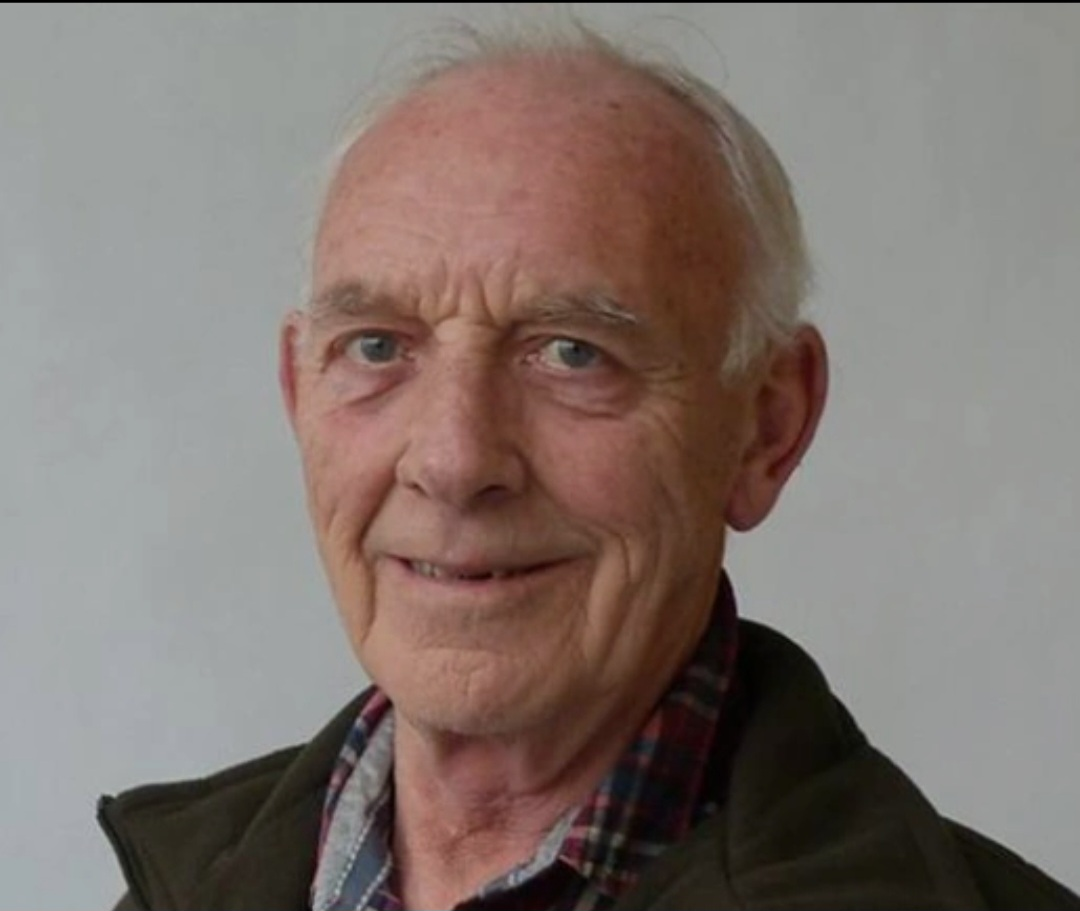
- Born: David Eric Allan; 8 March 1940; Tidworth, Wiltshire, England
- Died: 8 February 2026 (aged 85)
- Occupation: Actor

David Eric Allan (8 March 1940 – 8 February 2026) was a British actor.

== Life and career ==
David Eric Allan was born in Tidworth, Wiltshire, England on 8 March 1940. When he was 15, his family moved to Canada, but, set to become an actor, he returned to the Britain at 18.

His first film role was in Peter Brook's 1968 film Tell Me Lies, based on the play US in which Allan had appeared the previous year.

For 24 years, from 1997 to 2021, he played the part of farm worker Bert Fry in the long-running BBC Radio soap opera The Archers.

Allan died on 8 February 2026, at the age of 85.

== Selected filmography ==
- Tell Me Lies (1968)
- The McKenzie Break (1970)
- Bleak Moments (1971)
- I.D. (1995)

== Selected television ==
- Emmerdale (1972–1974) as Frank Blakey (regular role)
- Nuts in May (1976) as The Quarryman (Play for Today Episode)
- Hold the Back Page (1985–1986) as Reg
- Bergerac (1988) as Peter Retford in "Private Flight"

== Selected theatre ==
- US (1966)
