= Tell Me Lies (film) =

1968 British film by Peter Brook

- Theatrical release poster
- Directed by: Peter Brook
- Written by: Denis Cannan
- Produced by: Peter Brook
- Starring: Mark Jones; Pauline Munro; Eric Allan; Robert Langdon Lloyd
- Cinematography: Ian Wilson
- Edited by: Ralph Sheldon
- Music by: Richard Peaslee
- Production company: Ronorus Limited
- Release dates: 14 February 1968 (U.S.); 15 February 1968 (UK)
- Running time: 116 minutes
- Country: United Kingdom
- Language: English

Tell Me Lies, also known as Us, is a 1968 British documentary drama film directed and produced by Peter Brook. Based on the 1966 play US by Denis Cannan, it stars Mark Jones, Pauline Munro, Eric Allan, and Robert Langdon Lloyd. It was shot in London in the summer of 1967 and starred actors under contract to the Royal Shakespeare Company. The film looks at reactions to the American involvement in the Vietnam War and was highly controversial at the time of its release.

== Plot ==
A young couple, Bob Lloyd and Pauline Munro, see a photo in a magazine of a baby mutilated by napalm and it changes their lives. They ask is London aware, is London concerned?

== Cast ==
The majority of the cast play "guests" except where indicated:

- Mark Jones: Mark
- Pauline Munro: Pauline
- Eric Allan
- Robert Langdon Lloyd: Bob (as Robert Lloyd)
- Mary Allen
- Ian Hogg
- Glenda Jackson
- Joanne Lindsay
- Hugh Sullivan
- Kingsley Amis
- Peggy Ashcroft
- James Cameron
- Stokely Carmichael
- Tom Driberg
- Paul Scofield
- Patrick Wymark

Rest of cast listed alphabetically:

- Jeremy Anthony
- Hugh Armstrong
- Noel Collins
- John Hussey
- Marjie Lawrence
- Leon Lissek
- Ursula Mohan
- Reginald Paget
- Jacqueline Porcher
- Ivor Richards
- Clifford Rose
- Hilary Rose
- Steven Rose
- William Morgan Sheppard
- Barry Stanton
- Michael Williams
- Ian Wilson
- Henry Woolf
- Peregrine Worsthorne

== Soundtrack ==
A soundtrack album, Royal Shakespeare Company – Tell Me Lies (Gregar GGS-5000), was released in 1967, with music by Richard Peaslee and lyrics by Adrian Mitchell.

Side one

1. "Tell Me Lies"
2. "Road Number One"
3. "Make and Break"
4. "Barry Bondhus"
5. "God is Flame"

Side two

1. "Escalation"
2. "The Leeches"
3. "When Dreams Collide"
4. "Rose of Saigon"
5. "Zapping the Cong"
6. "Any Complaints"
7. "Icarus"

== Release ==
Tell Me Lies premièred on 14 February 1968 in New York, and on 15 February 1968 in London. It was originally intended to be shown at the Cannes Film Festival in 1968, but was not, being declared inappropriate in the political context of the time. At the Venice Film Festival, it received a special mention from the jury and was awarded the Luis Buñuel Prize.

== Critical reception ==
The Monthly Film Bulletin wrote:

A confused collage of politics and poetry, loosely held together by the attempts of a young couple, Mark and Pauline – appalled by the photograph of a grotesquely mutilated childi – to discover what they in London can do about the atrocities in Vietnam. Their quest takes them from protest demonstrations to a series of discussions – with a group of professional politicians, with a Buddhist monk resident in Hampstead, with left wing militants in Primrose Hill. And as they move about the city, the film itself moves from documentary reporting (shots of a Buddhist monk incinerating himself in front of an Esso station in Vietnam) to the stylised re-enactment of real events (Norman Morrison's last hours in Washington acted out with a minimum of histrionics against a London background), the stylised re-enactment of possible events (scenes in a homosexual bar in Saigon), fantasy (Mark's attempt to blow up the U.S. Embassy), and the biting satire of Adrian Mitchell's songs. Unfortunately, despite the sound Brechtian precedent for this kind of mixture, it irritates more than it stimulates.

The line between reality and fiction, or between reality and the artistic rearrangement of reality is constantly blurred: a party at which Mark engages in discussion with a group of writers and politicians, and Stokely Carmichael talks of the imminent destruction of the white race, degenerates implausibly into the orgiastic dance number "Zapping the Cong". But it is never clear whether Peter Brook intends this to demonstrate that seemingly rational statements by the war's reluctant apologists lead logically to the crudest extremes of hatred and violence, or whether he sees it as support for the thesis (implicit in the film's title) that we in London are in no position to learn the truth about Vietnam, so that the statements of politicians and the fantasies of theatrical producers have equal (and negative) validity. Certainly the film is as critical of English protest as it is of English politicians; yet its criticisms are curiously narcissistic. It denounces the middle-class, garden party atmosphere of British protest yet limits its scrutiny to middle-class protesters in N.W.3., making no mention of, for instance, trade union attitudes to the Vietnam war.

The film also seems critical of its characters' desire to "feel involved" without understanding the social significance of Chairman Mao's statement, delivered with great force by Glenda Jackson, that "a revolution is an act of violence by which one class overthrows another". Whereas the stage production of US ended with a vision of England shaken out of its complacency by revolution, the only image to emerge from Tell Me Lies is one of protracted impotence, ignorance and misunderstanding. Does Peter Brook mean to imply that there is no alternative to the situation he vituperatively denounces? Surely not, but this is the impression his film leaves.

Kine Weekly said:

This probing, thought-provoking film is constructed with great ingenuity and intelligence but is a little too long and complicated to sustain consistent interest. Its controversial ideas will stimulate sharp and conflicting reactions, making it a good attraction for specialist halls, particularly at university towns and cultural centres. ...Made in four weeks and financed by some seventy private individuals in America, the picture is a filmic extension and development of the Royal Shakespeare Company's controversial stage play US by Denis Cannan, with some of the players in their original, or similar, roles. Glenda Jackson is particularly striking as the Mao-ist. The story unfolds impressionistically, skilfully blended with documentary passages and dramatic reconstructions and broken up, whenever it is in danger of becoming too solid, with satirical songs, newsreel snippets and title flashes. The dramatic tension comes from audience identification with the young couple (Mark Jones and Pauline Munro) whose concern and sincerity cut through some of the more involved and obscure discussions. Interest flags when the arguments become too elusive and long-winded but there are always new images to startle or provoke.

Variety wrote:

Another 'New Left' slanted look at various attitudes toward the war in Vietnam. Best market in college towns and artie first-runs on propaganda aspects. Will offend many. Tell Me Lies, loosely based on the recent Peter Brook-Royal Shakespeare Co theatrical success de scandale "Us," is certain to stir up a hornet's nest of controversy in this country. While it ostensibly depicts a wide range of attitudes (in an eccentric amalgam of songs, vaudeville routines, cinema-verite discussions, documentary footage and conventional dramatic segments) toward the War in Vietnam, many are likely to view it as more of the recent flagrant anti-American propaganda from London and Paris and object violently. All of which may help its box office chances, especially among the college-age crowd that is increasingly preoccupied with the pros and cons of the draft and American intervention in Southeast Asia. ...Few films in the history of the medium have dealt exclusively with a contemporary political situation. It surely will stir discussion.

In The New Statesman John Coleman wrote:

Peter Brook's Tell Me Lies, (Gala-Royal) is a well-meant talkathon, based on that Aldwych happening Us largely to the extent of retaining some pretty dire Adrian Mitchell songs. Otherwise, the piece has been turned round utterly. I still just prefer it to that compilation, Far from Vietnam [1967] (which I duly saw again, as promised), but I happen to have given the Brook film a second look too: and it didn't sustain it. It's a manner of mammoth home-movie in appearance and all too often in concept, with loyal and excellent actors from the Royal Shakespeare Company mixing it with 'real' talkers like Reggie Paget MP, Kingsley Amis, Peregrine Worsthorne, and Stokely Carmichael (all these interviewed by an earnest young man, Mark Jones, at a ludicrous party, where 'Zapping the Cong' is apparently a popular dance number). Mr Jones and his girl, Pauline Munro, stand in throughout for us, worried searchers after the right path towards solving the Vietnam horror. The film is eccentrically edited (the synopsis "makes something for real that I was sure was dream-sequence) and has a way of evidencing its sincerity, Godard-fashion, by holding the camera interminably on the incoherent. What I continue to admire in it is a certain baffled concern for honesty: it touches in a fairly representative range of Anglo-Saxon attitudes to the near-and-far war, even if it makes many of them unconsciously ludicrous by its techniques of presentation.

== Restoration, 2010–2012 ==
In 2010, Peter Brook decided to track down his film, of which he had only a very damaged and incomplete 35mm copy. Through the intermediary of French screenwriter Jean-Claude Carrière, he made contact with the two foundations who had restored the complete film works of Pierre Etaix, co-written by Carrière. Archives were searched across Britain and Ireland, with film elements and a missing scene eventually found at the British Film institute. These elements consisted of 15 separate A and B reels, comprising the film's full 118-minute run time.

In December 2011, restoration began directed by Severine Wemaere, Director of the Technicolor Foundation for Cinema Heritage and Giles Duval, Director of the Groupama Gan Foundation. The exact look Peter Brook had created for the film in 1968 was accurately reproducedin the 2012 digital version.

== See also ==
- Anti-war films
