= November Criminals (film) =

- Theatrical release poster
- Directed by: Sacha Gervasi
- Screenplay by: Sacha Gervasi; Steven Knight
- Based on: The November Criminals by Sam Munson
- Produced by: Marc Bienstock; Ara Keshishian; Beth O'Neil; Erika Olde
- Starring: Ansel Elgort; Chloë Grace Moretz; Tessa Albertson; Catherine Keener; David Strathairn
- Cinematography: Mihai Mălaimare Jr.
- Edited by: Martin Pensa
- Music by: David Norland
- Production companies: Black Bicycle Entertainment; Lotus Entertainment
- Distributed by: Stage 6 Films; Vertical Entertainment
- Release date: November 7, 2017
- Running time: 85 minutes
- Country: United States
- Language: English

November Criminals is a 2017 American crime drama film, directed by Sacha Gervasi and written by Gervasi and Steven Knight, and based on Sam Munson's 2010 novel The November Criminals. The film stars Ansel Elgort, Chloë Grace Moretz, Catherine Keener, and David Strathairn. The film was released through video on demand on November 7, 2017, and opened in a limited release on December 8, 2017, by Stage 6 Films and Vertical Entertainment.

== Plot ==
The film opens with old footage of a young Addison Schacht and his mother playing at the beach. A voiceover reveals that she died of an aneurysm six months before the events of the movie.

In the present, teenage Addison is mailing his application to the University of Chicago, accompanied by his friend Phoebe Zeleny. Afterwards, they go to a local bakery for coffee. There, they greet Kevin Broadus, Addison and Phoebe's mutual friend, and an employee there. Back in their car, Phoebe proposes they lose their virginity together before leaving for college, so they head to Phoebe's to have sex. Directly after they leave, a motorcyclist pulls up and rushes inside. A moment later, a shot rings out.

Phoebe's mother calls with the news that Kevin was gunned down at the bakery. Addison heads home, but stops at the bakery, now an active crime scene. He asks a news cameraman about the shooting, who says it was probably gang-related. Addison is confused because he doubts Kevin could be involved with one.

Fed up with the authorities' dismissiveness about the shooting and everyone's eagerness to forget, Addison starts his own investigation into Kevin's murder. He puts up posters around the school, asking anyone to call if they have more information about the shooting. Addison also steals Kevin's file from the school records, where he and Phoebe learn that Kevin was seeing the counselor because he seemed emotionally detached and distant.

A student who had witnessed the shooting tells Phoebe the shooter was white, and not black as reported. He also mentions that Kevin had been hanging out with former student Noel. Meanwhile, Addison gets a week's suspension after administrators find Kevin's stolen file in his locker.

Phoebe tells Addison what she heard, so they find Noel in his shady Washington, D.C. neighborhood. He is with D Cash, who tells Addison they will be in touch. When Addison asks Kevin's parents if they have any information about why he was murdered, they say he had become secretive and show him a drug stash. The angered dad assaults Addison, suspecting that he is a drug dealer.

Noel and D Cash call Addison to meet. Addison attempts to get Phoebe to leave her mother's house party, but she declines. Addison admits his feelings for her and leaves to meet Noel and D Cash.

Noel and D Cash reveal that Kevin disrespected a powerful drug dealer at a nightclub several days before he was killed, and they agree to give Addison the name of a guy who was there that night, only if he makes a drug delivery to Chevy Chase (an affluent neighborhood they cannot get into). Addison delivers the drugs to a large mansion that belongs to Phoebe's friend Alex. Afterwards, he is given the name Mike Lorinner.

Addison calls Phoebe to tell her about Mike, and she implores him to call the police and let them handle it. He ignores her and arrives at Lorinner's house, setting up a video camera to record the confrontation. When Lorinner opens the door, Addison questions him about the night at the club. He tells Addison to leave, but presses him about how he found him.

At the same time that Lorinner notices the red "record" light on the camera, Addison notices the same motorcycle that the shooter was reportedly riding. Lorinner holds Addison at gunpoint and reveals that the drug dealer that Kevin disrespected was, in fact, D Cash. As the police arrive (presumably called by Phoebe), Addison rushes a momentarily distracted Lorinner, who shoots him in the shoulder and runs off.

Phoebe visits the recovering Addison in the hospital, telling him Lorinner, D Cash, and Noel were all arrested by the police. Later, they attend Kevin's funeral. Addison is accepted into the University of Chicago, while Phoebe will be attending Yale. In their final meeting before leaving for college, Phoebe hands Addison an envelope containing the train schedule between Chicago and New Haven. Addison returns home, where he joins his dad in watching old videos of Mrs. Schacht.

== Cast ==
- Ansel Elgort as Addison Schacht, Phoebe's friend and love interest, and Theo's son
- Chloë Grace Moretz as Phoebe "Digger" Zeleny, Addison's friend and love interest, and Fiona's daughter
- David Strathairn as Theo Schacht, Addison's father
- Catherine Keener as Fiona Zeleny, Phoebe's mother
- Terry Kinney as Principal Karlstadt
- Cory Hardrict as D Cash
- Philip Ettinger as Mike Lorriner
- Danny Flaherty as Noel
- Victor Williams as Mr. Broadus, Kevin's father
- Opal Alladin as Mrs. Broadus, Kevin's mother
- Tessa Albertson as Alex Faustner
- Adrian Mompoint as Bo
- Jared Kemp as Kevin Broadus
- Georgia Lyman as Nurse
- Travis Leonard as Student with Glasses

== Production ==
=== Casting ===
In November 2014, it was reported Chloë Grace Moretz and Catherine Keener had been cast in the film. In January 2015, Ansel Elgort was set to play the lead. Before Elgort's casting, Tom Holland auditioned for the role. David Strathairn also joined on March 23, 2015.

=== Filming ===
Filming began on March 23, 2015, in Rhode Island and Washington, D.C., and wrapped on April 28, 2015, after 32 days of filming.

== Release ==
In January 2015, Sony Pictures Worldwide Acquisitions acquired North American and international distribution rights to the film. The film was released through video on demand on November 7, 2017, before opening in a limited release on December 8, 2017.

Vertical Entertainment theatrically distributed the film, though did not receive marquee credit.

== Reception ==
On Rotten Tomatoes, the film has an approval rating of 0%, based on reviews from 11 critics, with an average rating of 3.46 out of ten. On Metacritic, the film has a weighted average score of 31 out of 100, based on five reviews, indicating "generally unfavorable reviews".

Sheri Linden of The Hollywood Reporter wrote: "The starry chemistry of leads Ansel Elgort and Chloë Grace Moretz injects a modicum of energy into the coming-of-age drama, whose elements of romance, crime and smart-kid angst never coalesce."

Variety's Owen Gleiberman called it "a low-budget generic shrug of a movie, one that recycles clichés both ancient (testy drug dealers) and slightly less ancient (the hero films his life with a camcorder)."
