= The November Criminals =

2010 novel by Sam Munson

- First edition
- Author: Sam Munson
- Language: English
- Genre: Young adult novel
- Publisher: Doubleday
- Publication date: 20 April 2010
- Publication place: United States
- Media type: Print
- Pages: 272
- ISBN: 978-0-385-53227-3

The November Criminals is a novel by Sam Munson published in 2010.

The book is the author's first novel; by April 2010, it was found in over 300 WorldCat libraries. It was published by Doubleday in 2010, and reprinted as an Anchor paperback in 2011. It was reviewed in the New York Times Book Review, the Washington Post, and in the magazine Commentary, published by the American Jewish Committee. It was the subject of an essay in the New York Times education section, and was listed by them as an "Editors Choice".

== Plot summary ==
The hero of the book is 18-year-old Addison Schacht, a Jewish high-school senior in Washington D.C. He is in the process of applying to the University of Chicago, where he plans to study classics. The book is his response to the essay question, "What are your best and worst qualities?". He explains he has only "worst qualities", as illustrated by the events of his senior year. They include collecting offensive jokes; dealing drugs to his classmates; and insulting teachers, fellow students, and his girlfriend's mother. But when his classmate Kevin Broadus is killed in a senseless shooting, Addison develops a plan to investigate the death in hopes of finding the killer, and maybe finding some "best qualities" in himself.

== Film adaptation ==
A film based on the novel, titled November Criminals, was released in 2017. It stars Ansel Elgort and Chloë Grace Moretz in the lead roles.
