= Eugenio Carmi =

Italian painter (1920–2016)

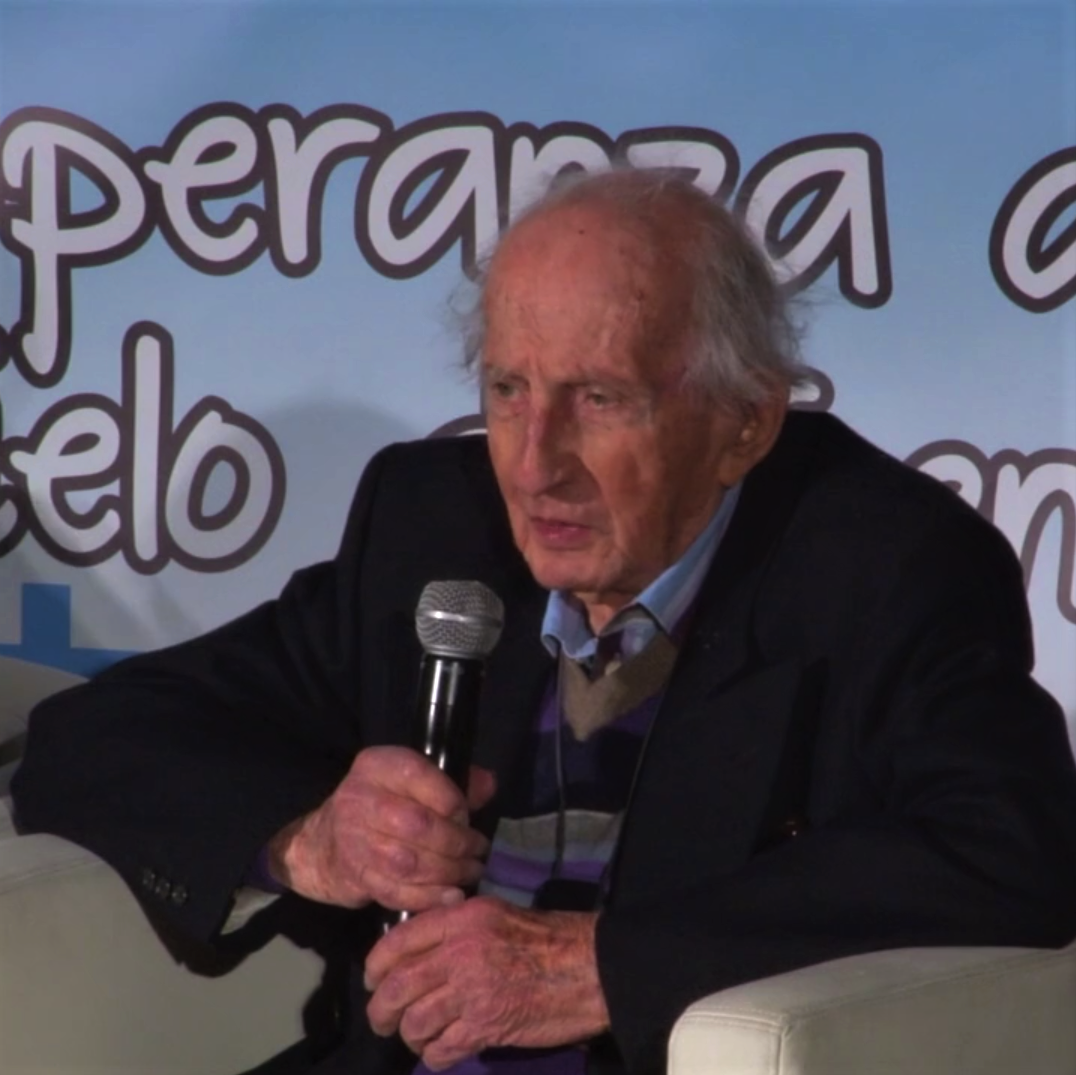
- Born: 17 February 1920; Genoa, Italy
- Died: 16 February 2016 (aged 95); Lugano, Switzerland
- Occupations: Painter, sculptor

Eugenio Carmi (17 February 1920 – 16 February 2016) was an Italian painter and sculptor. He is considered to have been one of the main exponents of abstractionism in Italy.

== Biography ==
Born in Genoa, Italy, in 1938 Carmi moved to Switzerland because of the racial laws imposed by Italian nationalist and the founder of Italian Fascism, Benito Mussolini. He graduated in Chemistry at the ETH Zurich, Switzerland Carmi returned to Italy after the war, where he studied painting with Felice Casorati and sculpture with Guido Galletti.

In the early 1950s, Carmi abandoned the informal style and adopted a geometric rigor in his works. His works often used factory materials such as welded steel and iron.

Between 1958 and 1965 Carmi collaborated with the steel company Italsider (later Ilva) as their responsible for the image. In 1963 he founded with Flavio Costantini and Emanuele Luzzati the cooperative of artists Galleria del Deposito. A close friend of Umberto Eco, he collaborated with him on several projects. He also taught in several academies.
