= Billy Aronson =

American playwright and writer

Billy Aronson is an American playwright and writer, who originated the concept of the rock opera Rent, which was based on Puccini's opera La bohème.

== Early life ==
He attended Lower Merion High School, Princeton University and Yale Drama School.

== Rent and other plays ==
In 1988, as a playwright he wanted to create "a musical based on Puccini's La Bohème, in which the luscious splendor of Puccini's world would be replaced with the coarseness and noise of modern New York." In 1989 he began a collaboration with Jonathan Larson, and provided lyrics for Rent, "I Should Tell You", and "Santa Fe".

In addition to Rent, he has written many one act plays including "Light Years (one-act)", "Reunions", "The News", "Little Duck", Of Two Minds, Night Rules, and In the Middle of the Night, which were performed in Ensemble Studio Theatre Marathons. His short plays have been published in six volumes of "Best American Short Plays" and collected in "Funny Shorts".

Full-length plays by Aronson include "Light Years" which premiered at Playwrights Horizons, "The Art Room" which premiered at the Woolly Mammoth Theatre and Wellfleet Harbor Actors Theater, and "First Day of School" which premiered at 1812 Productions and SF Playhouse, and was named Best New Play for a medium-sized theater by the Bay Area Theatre Critics Circle in 2009.

He also wrote the book for the musical Click Clack Moo, which was nominated for a Lucille Lortel Award for Best New Musical, and wrote the libretto for Flurry Tale with composer Rusty Magee which premiered at Malmo Opera in Sweden under the name "Vinteryra". He has written for many popular children shows, such as Postcards from Buster, Codename: Kids Next Door, Wonder Pets!, The Upside Down Show, The Backyardigans, Courage the Cowardly Dog, and co-created Peg + Cat along with Jennifer Oxley. He was also a writer on Beavis and Butthead. His writing for television has won him 5 Daytime Emmy Awards.

== Personal life ==
Aronson is Jewish. He currently lives in New York City with his wife Lisa Vogel (whom he married in 1990), and children Anna and Jake.
