= Richard Peaslee =

Richard Peaslee (June 13, 1930, New York NY – August 20, 2016) was a composer who worked in a variety of idioms, including chorus, orchestra, dance, and soundtracks for film and television, but he was most active as a composer for the theatre.

== Education ==
He received his undergraduate degree in Music Composition from Yale University, and after serving two years in the U.S. Army, received a master's degree from The Juilliard School, in addition to studying privately with Nadia Boulanger in Paris and William Russo in New York and London.

== Works ==
He had written the music for:

=== London ===
- the Peter Brook / Royal Shakespeare Company productions of Marat/Sade, A Midsummer Night's Dream, US / Tell Me Lies and Antony and Cleopatra;
- Peter Hall / National Theatre Animal Farm;
- Terry Hands / RSC Tamburlaine the Great;
- and the musical Moby-Dick.

=== New York City ===
- Joseph Papp / New York Shakespeare Festival Richard III, Henry IV, Parts 1 and 2, Troilus and Cressida and Antigone;
- Martha Clarke and Music Theatre Group The Garden of Earthly Delights, Vienna Lusthaus, The Hunger Artist and Miracolo d'Amore;
- Broadway Indians, Teibele and Her Demon, Frankenstein and Boccaccio;
- children's / family theatre The Snow Queen, The Children's Crusade and Tanglewood Tales; and an opera, Sir Gawain and the Green Knight.
- Golden Fleece Ltd., The Composers Chamber Theater

=== Dance ===
- Touch, commissioned and performed by the New York City Ballet
- The Four Humours, commissioned and performed by the Pilobolus dance company

=== Film and television ===
His film scores include the Peter Brook films Marat/Sade (1967) and Tell Me Lies (1968). His music for television includes the Emmy-nominated score for Joseph Campbell/Bill Moyers series The Power of Myth, Claudia Shear's Blown Sideways Through Life (American Playhouse), and Time/Life's Wild, Wild World of Animals.

=== Symphonic and jazz works ===
Peaslee's works have been performed by the Philadelphia, Detroit, Seattle, Milwaukee, Indianapolis, and Buffalo Symphony Orchestras; William Russo's London Jazz Orchestra, Chicago Jazz Ensemble, Stan Kenton and Ted Heath Orchestras and Gerry Mulligan.

Arrows of Time for Solo Trombone and Band was composed in 1993 for Joseph Alessi and the United States Army Band.

== Awards ==
- American Academy of Arts and Letters Marc Blitzstein award
- Obie
- Villager Award
- NEA fellowships.
- NYFA fellowships.
