= Marian Pop =

Romanian opera singer

- Born: Cluj, Romania
- Occupation: Operatic baritone
- Years active: 1995–present
- Employer(s): Vienna State Opera; Volksoper Wien; Theater Basel; Staatstheater Kassel
- Notable work: Creating title role in Cyrano

Marian Pop is a Romanian operatic baritone who has performed in operas and concerts since the mid-1990s. He has appeared in several Verdi leading roles in broadcast performances released by OperaVision and SWR Fernsehen at Opernfestspiele Heidenheim. He played the title role in the 21st-century opera Cyrano by David DiChiera in 2011. His most performed role is Figaro in Gioachino Rossini’s Il barbiere di Siviglia, which he has performed over 600 times. Pop represented Romania in the 1997 BBC Cardiff Singer of the World competition. In the later part of his career, he has focused on the Italian repertory, especially the operas of Verdi, performing 11 major roles.

== Biography ==
=== Early life and training ===
Born in Cluj, Pop initially trained as a violinist before turning to vocal studies after being encouraged by a teacher who recognised his vocal potential.

=== Singing career ===
Soon after graduating from his singing studies in 1995, Pop was engaged at the Staatsoper and Volksoper Vienna, appearing in roles including Ping, Valentin, Falke, Homonay and Malatesta between 1995 and 1999. During this period he appeared alongside Leo Nucci, Simon Keenlyside and Dmitri Hvorostovsky, and worked with Jonathan Miller in his 1997 production of Fedora. That same year he appeared at the BBC Cardiff Singer of the World competition representing Romania.

He subsequently appeared as a guest at the Opéra Bastille in Paris and the Staatsoper Stuttgart, performing roles including Marullo, Eisenstein, Beckmesser and Dr. Falke which received a favourable review in The New York Times, and the title role in Il ritorno di Ulisse in patria. In 2005 he joined the permanent soloist ensemble of Theater Basel.

Pop created and premiered the title role in David DiChiera’s opera Cyrano, based on Edmond Rostand’s play Cyrano de Bergerac, at Michigan Opera Theatre in October 2007. DiChiera wrote the role specifically for Pop, collaborating with him during the composition and rehearsal process. He later performed the role in Philadelphia and at Florida Grand Opera, where the production received critical attention.

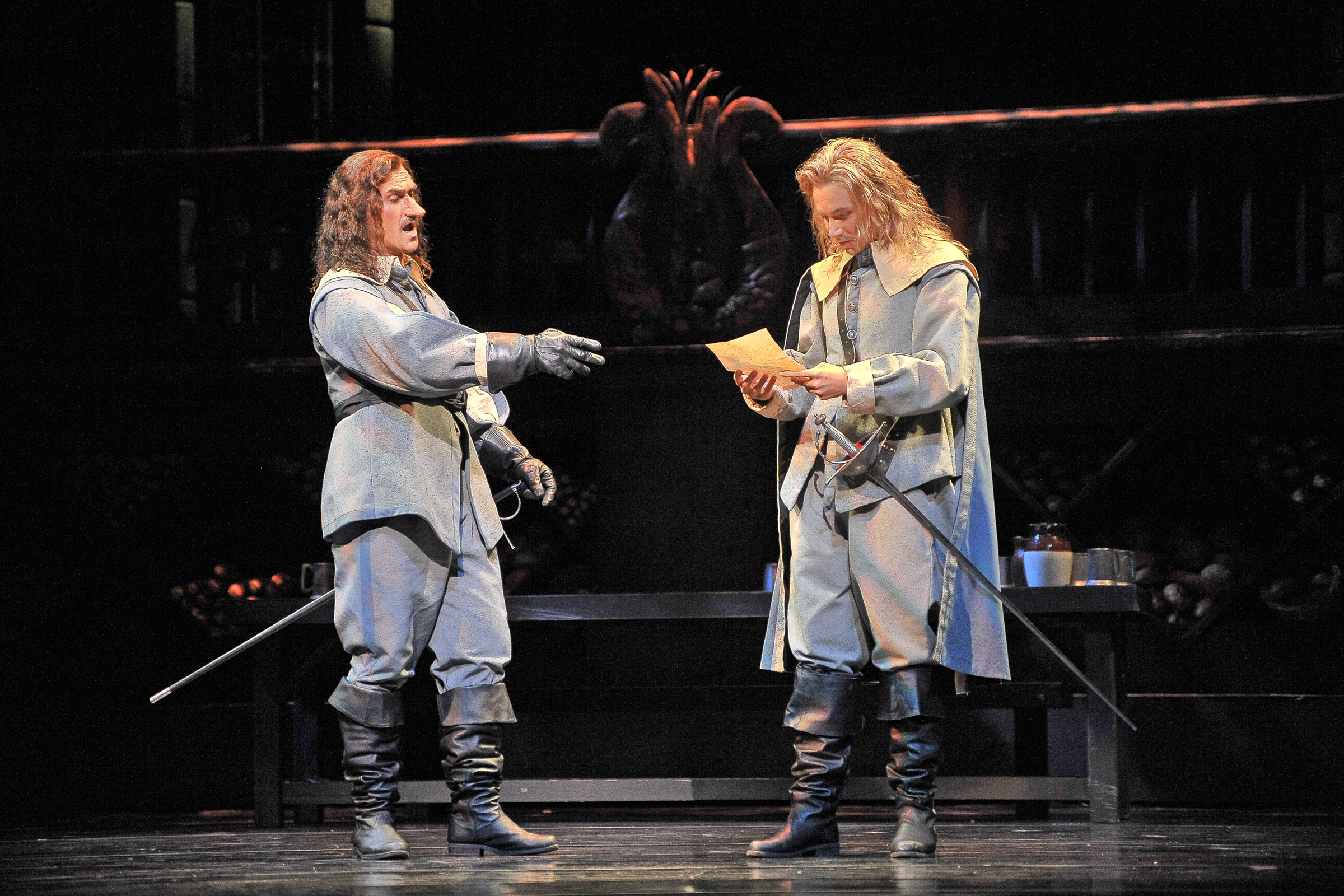
Marian Pop and Sébastien Guèze in Cyrano at Florida Grand Opera

In 2013, Pop joined the permanent soloist ensemble of Staatstheater Kassel, where he was awarded the Kassel Volksbühne Prize in 2015 following a public vote.

Since then, Pop has gone on to sing almost all the major baritone Verdi roles, including Count di Luna in Il trovatore, Renato in Un ballo in maschera, Rigoletto, Germont in La traviata, Macbeth, Don Carlos in Ernani, Ezio in Attila, and the title role in Alzira. He has appeared as Rigoletto at Staatstheater Kassel, Maribor Slovene National Theatre and Stadttheater Bremerhaven, and sang Macbeth in Bremerhaven. He performed Alzira and Attila at the Opernfestspiele Heidenheim. He has also performed La forza del destino at Operklosterneuburg near Vienna and the Requiem at the Lucerne Culture and Congress Centre.

In 2017 Pop sang the title role of Cardillac at the Salzburger Landestheater. Pop has also appeared as a guest artist at Stadttheater Klagenfurt.

In 2026 it was announced that Pop would return to Opernfestspiele Heidenheim to sing Jago

=== Personal life ===
He lives with his wife and their son in Austria.

== Teaching ==
In 2017 Pop completed a doctorate in vocal pedagogy, titled Improving Stage Diction in Opera Performance, at the Gheorghe Dima National Music Academy. In 2020 he joined the Anton Bruckner Private University (Institute for Voice and Music Theatre) in Linz as a lecturer in singing and published two books on stage pronunciation and phonetic-semantic analysis.

== Selected operatic roles ==
- David DiChiera
  - Cyrano – Cyrano
- Gaetano Donizetti
  - Don Pasquale – Dottor Malatesta
  - L'elisir d'amore – Belcore
- Charles Gounod
  - Faust – Valentin
  - Roméo et Juliette – Mercutio
- Paul Hindemith
  - Cardillac – Cardillac
- Thomas Johnson
  - The Four-Note Opera – Baritone
- Erich Wolfgang Korngold
  - Die tote Stadt – Frank
- Franz Lehár
  - Die lustige Witwe – Graf Danilo
- Ruggero Leoncavallo
  - Pagliacci – Tonio; Silvio
- Jules Massenet
  - Cendrillon – Pandolphe
- Pietro Mascagni
  - Cavalleria rusticana – Alfio
- Claudio Monteverdi
  - Il ritorno d'Ulisse in patria – Ulisse
- Wolfgang Amadeus Mozart
  - Le nozze di Figaro – Conte Almaviva
  - Don Giovanni – Don Giovanni
  - Così fan tutte – Guglielmo
  - La clemenza di Tito – Publius
- Amilcare Ponchielli
  - La Gioconda – Barnaba
- Sergei Prokofiev
  - L'amour des trois oranges – Pantalone
- Giacomo Puccini
  - La bohème – Marcello; Schaunard
  - Turandot – Ping
  - Gianni Schicchi – Gianni Schicchi
  - Tosca – Scarpia
  - Manon Lescaut – Geronte
- Gioachino Rossini
  - Il barbiere di Siviglia – Figaro
  - La Cenerentola – Dandini
  - L'italiana in Algeri – Taddeo
- Richard Strauss
  - Ariadne auf Naxos – Harlekin
  - Der Rosenkavalier – Faninal
  - Die Frau ohne Schatten – Der Einäugige
- Johann Strauss II
  - Die Fledermaus – Eisenstein; Dr. Falke
- Pyotr Ilyich Tchaikovsky
  - Eugene Onegin – Eugene Onegin
- Giuseppe Verdi
  - Il trovatore – Conte di Luna
  - Don Carlo – Rodrigo, Marchese di Posa
  - Un ballo in maschera – Renato
  - Macbeth – Macbeth
  - Rigoletto – Rigoletto; Marullo
  - Ernani – Don Carlo
  - Alzira – Gusmano
  - Attila – Ezio
  - Otello – Iago
  - La forza del destino – Don Carlo di Vargas; Un chirurgo
  - La Traviata – Father Germont
- Richard Wagner
  - Die Meistersinger von Nürnberg – Beckmesser
  - Götterdämmerung – Gunther
  - Das Rheingold – Donner
  - Tristan und Isolde – Melot
- Mieczysław Weinberg
  - Die Passagierin – Tadeusz

== Discography ==
=== CD ===
Verdi: Alzira

- Released: 7 November 2025
- Format: 2-CD
- Label: Coviello Classics

Busoni: Doktor Faust

- Released: 8 November 2024
- Format: 3-CD
- Label: Naxos

Verdi: Ernani (Nominated for Opus Klassik Award 2020)

- Released: 2019
- Format: 2-CD
- Label: OH! Opernfestspiele Heidenheim

DiChiera: Cyrano (World Premier)

- Released: 2007
- Format: 3-CD
- Label: Michigan Opera Theater

Orff: Carmina Burana

- Released: 1998
- Format: 1-CD
- Label: Teatro Municipal, Santiago de Chile

=== DVD ===
Busoni: Doktor Faust

- Released: March 2024
- Format: Blu-ray
- Label: Dynamic

Rossini: La Cenerentola

- Released: 1995
- Format: DVD
- Label: Romanian National Television

== Publications ==
- Pop, Marian (2020). An Exploration of Stage Pronunciation. Cluj-Napoca: Editura MediaMusica. ISBN 978-606-645-140-6.
- Pop, Marian (2020). Studies in Phonetic and Semantic Analysis. Cluj-Napoca: Editura MediaMusica. ISBN 978-606-645-141-3.
