= Sébastien Guèze =

French opera singer

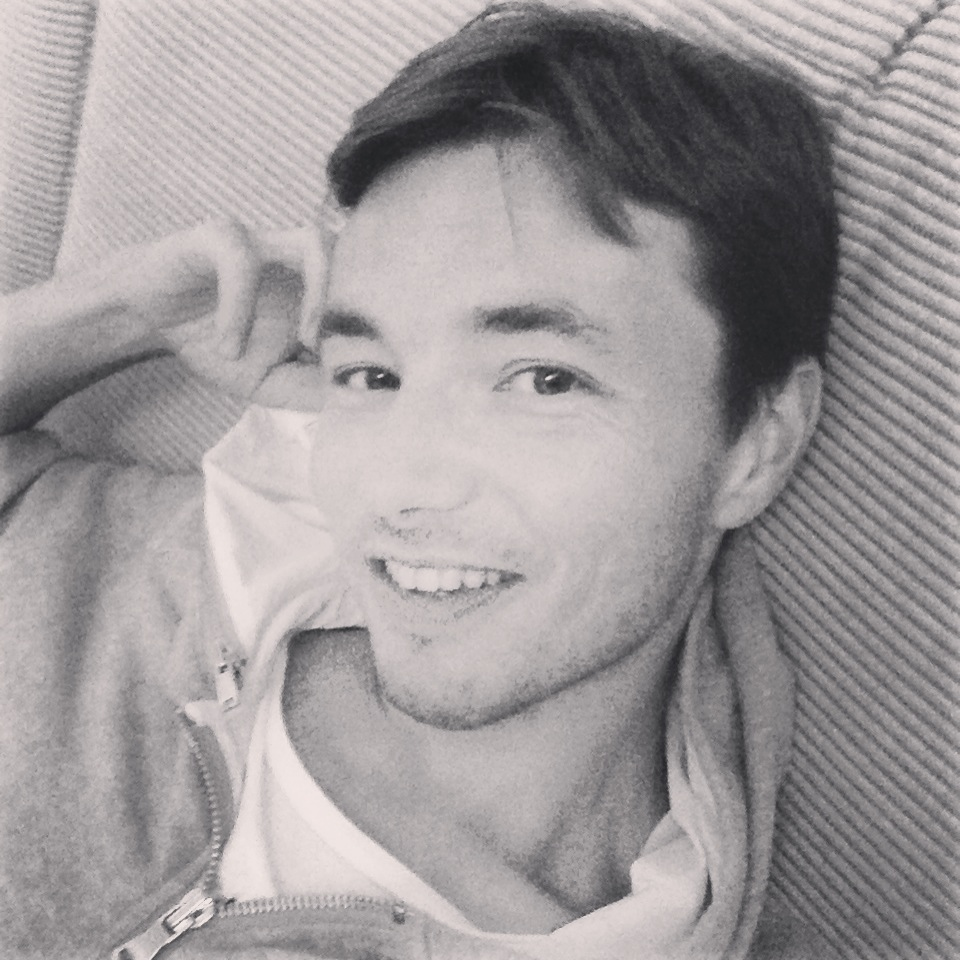
- Sébastien Guèze
- Born: 28 July 1979 (age 47); Lyon, France
- Citizenship: France
- Occupation: Tenor
- Years active: 2006–present
- Awards: see Awards
- Website: www.sebastiengueze.com

Sébastien Guèze (born 28 July 1979) is a classical French tenor. He sings the French and Italian romantic repertory including Donizetti, Verdi, Puccini, Gounod, Bizet and Massenet.

== Biography ==
Born in Lyon, France, he grew up in the Ardèche mountains in south of France, he studied singing at the conservatory of Nîmes, doing a Master in Business at the University of Montpellier, then he came to the National Conservatory of Music of Paris that he finished First Prize with Jury congratulations.

In 2006, he won the Audience Prize and the Second Prize at international contest of Plácido Domingo, Operalia.

He started titles roles with Rodolfo in La bohème in 2008 at the National Opera of Athens staged by Graham Vick, then receiving widespread recognition as one of the most promising tenors of his generation. French Tenor Sebastien Gueze has come to international attention for his performances in theaters including the Semperoper Dresden, Theatre Royale de le Monnaie Brussels, La Fenice Venezia, Roma Santa Cecilia, Paris Opera Comique, Paris Théâtre des Champs Elysées, Opera de Marseille, Opera de Bordeaux, Teatro São Pedro São Paulo, Opera de Nuevo León Mexico, The Warsaw Opera, the Florida Grand Opera in Miami and many others.

== Awards ==
=== Prizes ===
- Audience Prize and Second Prize, Contest Plácido Domingo – Operalia, 2008
- First Prize at Conservatoire national supérieur de musique et de danse de Paris avec "Félicitations du Jury", 2008
- First Prize European Voice Contest of Arles, 2004
- Silver Voice (First Prize Man) at "Tournoi de Metz", France, 2003

=== Nominations ===
- 2006 : L'ADAMI (National Administration for artists and musicians), named Lyric Artist Revelation
- 2009 : Victoires de la musique classique, catégory ''Lyric Artist Revelation of the year.

== Career ==
=== Venues ===
- La Fenice Venezia, Semperoper Dresden, La Monnaie De Munt Brussels, Roma Santa Cecilia, Paris Opera Comique, Théâtre des Champs Elysées Paris, Miami Florida Grand Opera, Long Center Austin Opera, Palau de les Arts Reina Sofia Valencia, Opera de Marseille, Opera de Bordeaux, Teatro São Pedro São Paulo, Opera de Nuevo León Mexico, Hong Kong, Opera Omaha, Teatr Wielki Warsaw
- Concertgebouw Amsterdam, Oji Hall Tokio, Walt Disney Concert Hall Los Angeles, Salle Pleyel Paris, Grand Hall Philharmonia Saint Petersburg
- Festival des Chorégies d'Orange, Festival de Spoleto (Italie), Festival de Schwetzingen, Festival de Nuremberg, Festival de Radio France, Festival "Un violon sur le sable", Festival International des Arts d’Harare (Zimbabwe), Festival des Alizés Maroc

=== Main roles ===
- La bohème – Rodolfo (15 productions: La Fenice Venezia, La Monnaie Brussels, Köln, Athens, Austin Texas, Helsinki Finland, Liège Belgium, Dessau, Vichy, Saint-Etienne, Vilnius, Leeds, Manchester, Wiesbaden, Bordeaux)
- Les Contes d'Hoffmann – Hoffmann (5 productions: Essen Aalto theater, Dresden Semperoper, Freiburg, Hessisches Staatstheater Wiesbaden, Bonn Oper)
- Faust – Faust (5 productions: Omaha, Wroclaw, Pampelune Spain, Reims, Toulon France)
- Roméo et Juliette – Romeo (4 productions: Miami, Hong Kong, Amsterdam, Monterrey Mexico)
- Werther – Werther (4 productions: La Fenice Venice Italia, Operas of Metz, Massy, Reims France)
- La traviata – Alfredo (4 productions: Dresden Semperoper, La Monnaie De Munt Bruxelles, Theatr Wielki Warsaw, Louisville USA)
- Madama Butterfly – Pinkerton (3 productions: Avignon, Festival de Chartres, Festival Musiques au Coeur Antibes)
- Rigoletto – Il duca (2 productions: Mantova Italy, Guadalajara Mexico)
- Manon – Chevalier des Grieux (2 productions: Marseille, France; Vilnius Lithuanian National Opera)
- L'elisir d'amore – Nemorino (São Paulo, Brazil)
- Les pêcheurs de perles – Nadir (Strasbourg Mulhouse Opera du Rhin)
- Pelléas et Mélisande – Pelléas (Opéra de Nice, France)

== Chronology ==
- 2007 : Eugene Oneguin by Piotr Ilitch Tchaïkovski, role Lensky, stage Emmanuelle Cordoliani, Paris Cité de la musique CNSMDP
- 2007 : Djamileh by Georges Bizet, role Haroun, conductor Miquel Ortega, stage Pierre Jourdan, Théâtre Impérial de Compiègne
- 2008 : Salammbô by Ernest Reyer, role de Schahabarim, conductor Lawrence Foster, stage Yves Coudray, Opéra municipal de Marseille, France
- 2008 : La Bohème by Giacomo Puccini, role Rodolfo, conductor Karytinos, stage Graham Vick, Opéra d'Athènes, Grèce
- 2008 : Romeo and Juliet by Charles Gounod, role Roméo, conductor Giuliano Carella, Radio Kamer Filharmonie, Concertgebouw Amsterdam
- 2008 : Madama Butterfly by Giacomo Puccini, role Pinkerton, stage Ève Ruggiéri, Festival Musiques au Cœur d'Antibes
- 2008 : Le Roi d'Ys by Edouard Lalo, role Mylio, conductor Patrick Davin, stage Jean-Louis Pichon, Opéra Royal de Wallonie, Liège, Belgium
- 2009 : La Périchole by Jacques Offenbach, role Piquillo, conductor Pablo Heras-Casado, stage Omar Porras, Opéra national de Bordeaux, France
- 2009 : Faust by Charles Gounod, role Faust, conductor Vincent Monteil, stage Opéra de Pampelune, Espagne
- 2009 : "Mireille" by Charles Gounod, role Vincent, conductor Cyril Diedrich, stage Robert Fortune, Opéra municipal de Marseille
- 2009 : La Traviata by Giuseppe Verdi, role Alfredo Germont, conductor Kelly Kuo, stage James Marvel, Opera Louisville, Kentucky, U.S.
- 2009 : Marius et Fanny by Vladimir Cosma, role Marius, conductor Jacques Lacombe, stage Jean-Louis Grinda, Opéra municipal de Marseille
- 2009 : "Andromaque" by André Ernest Modeste Grétry, role Pyrrhus, conductor Hervé Niquet, Paris
- 2009 : La Bohème by Giacomo Puccini, role Rodolfo, conductor Richard Buckley, Stage Director Garnett Bruce, Opera Long Center, Austin, Texas, U.S.
- 2009 : La Bohème by Giacomo Puccini, role Rodolfo, conductor Alexander Joel, Stage Director Willy Decker, Opera Koln, Germany
- 2009-2010 : Marius et Fanny de Vladimir Cosma, role Marius, conductor de Dominique Trottein, stage Jean-Louis Grinda, Opéra d'Avignon
- 2010 : La Bohème by Giacomo Puccini, role Rodolfo, conductor Karytinos, stage Graham Vick, Greek National Opera of Athens
- 2010 : La Traviata de Giuseppe Verdi, role Alfredo Germont, conductor Miguel Gomez-Martinez, stage Mariusz Treliński, Wielki Theater, Warsaw, Poland
- 2010 : "Andromaque" by André Ernest Modeste Grétry, role Pyrrhus, conductor Hervé Niquet, stage Georges Lavaudant, Festival of Schwetzingen
- 2010 : La Bohème by Giacomo Puccini, role Rodolfo, conductor Laurent Campellone, stage Jean Louis Pichon, Sylvie Auget, Opéra-théâtre de Saint-Étienne, France
- 2010 : Rigoletto by Giuseppe Verdi, role il Duca, conductor Zubin Mehta, stage Marco Bellocchio, Mantoue
- 2010 : Madama Butterfly by Giacomo Puccini, role Pinkerton, conductor Pierre-Michel Durand, stage Jean-François Vinciguerra, Festival de Chartres
- 2010 : "Andromaque" by André Ernest Modeste Grétry, role Pyrrhus, conductor Hervé Niquet, stage Georges Lavaudant, Festival de Montpellier, Festival de Schwetzingen, Palais des Beaux-Arts (Bozar) Bruxelles
- 2010 : Lodoïska de Luigi Cherubini, role Floreski, conductor Jérémie Rhorer, TCE Théâtre des Champs-Élysées Paris, Venise La Fenice, Accademia Nazionale di Santa Cecilia, Roma, Italy
- 2010 : La Bohème de Giacomo Puccini, role Rodolfo, conductor Paolo Arrivabeni et Andriy Yurkevych, stage Jean-Louis Pichon, Opéra Royal de Wallonie, Liège, Belgium
- 2010 : La Bohème de Giacomo Puccini, role Rodolfo, conductor Carlo Rizzi, stage Andreas Homoki, Théâtre royal de la Monnaie
- 2011 : La Bohème de Giacomo Puccini, role Rodolfo, direction musicale de, mise en sène de, Opéra Helsinki Finland
- 2011 : La Bohème de Giacomo Puccini, role Rodolfo, conductor Juraj Valčuha et Matteo Beltrami, stage Francesco Micheli, Venise La Fenice, Italy
- 2011 : "Cyrano de Bergerac" by David DiChiera, role Christian, conductor Mark Flint, stage Bernard Uzan, Florida Grand Opera, Miami, United States
- 2011 : "Amelia al ballo" by Gian Carlo Menotti, role L'amante, conductor Johannes Debus, stage Giorgio Ferrara, Festival dei due mondi Spoleto Italia
- 2011 : "Amelia al ballo" by Gian Carlo Menotti, role L'amante, conductor Plácido Domingo, stage Jean Louis Grinda, Palau de les Arts Reina Sofia, Valencia, Spain
- 2011-2012 : La Grande-Duchesse de Gérolstein by Jacques Offenbach, role Fritz, conductor Cyril Diedrich, stage Omar Porras, Opéra de Lausanne, Switzerland
- 2011 : Faust by Charles Gounod, role Faust, conductor Antony Hermus, stage Paul Emile Fourny, Opéra de Toulon
- 2011-2012 : La Bohème by Giacomo Puccini, role Rodolfo, conductor Antony Hermus, stage Roman Hovenbitzer, Anhaltisches Theater, Germany
- 2012 : La Chartreuse de Parme by Henri Sauguet, role Fabrice del Dongo, conductor Lawrence Foster, stage Renée Auphan, Opéra municipal de Marseille, France
- 2012 : Faust by Charles Gounod, role Faust, conductor Dominique Trottein, stage Paul Emile Fourny, Opéra de Reims, France
- 2012 : Romeo and Juliet by Charles Gounod, role Roméo, conductor Joseph Mechavich, stage David Lefkowich, Florida Grand Opera, Miami, United States
- 2012 : L'elisir d'amore by Gaetano Donizetti, role Nemorino, stage director Walter Neiva, conductor Emiliano Patarra, Opéra Teatro São Pedro São Paulo, Brazil
- 2012 : La Bohème by Giacomo Puccini, role Rodolfo, stage Claude Stratz, Opéra de Vichy, France
- 2012 : La Traviata by Giuseppe Verdi, role Alfredo Germont, conductor Ádám Fischer, stage Andrea Breth, Théâtre royal de la Monnaie
- 2013 : Pelléas et Mélisande by Claude Debussy, role "Pelléas", conductor Philippe Auguin, staged by René Koering, Opéra de Nice
- 2013 : La Traviata by Giuseppe Verdi, role Alfredo Germont, stage Andreas Homoki, conductor Julian Kovatchev, Semperoper Dresden
- 2013 : Le Roi d'Ys by Edouard Lalo, role Mylio, conductor Patrick Davin, Opéra-Comique Paris
- 2013 : Les pêcheurs de perles by Georges Bizet, role Nadir, conductor Patrick Davin, stage Vincent Boussard, Opéra de Strasbourg, France
- 2013 : Dialogues des Carmélites by Francis Poulenc, role "Chevalier de La Force", with Hélène Guilmette, Sabine Devieilhe, stage Christophe Honoré, conductor Kasushi Ono, Opéra national de Lyon
- 2013 : Les Mousquetaires au couvent by Louis Varney, role "Gontran de Solanges" stage Jérôme Deschamps, conductor Philippe Béran, Opéra de Lausanne
- 2013 : Madama Butterfly by Giacomo Puccini, role Pinkerton, with Ermonela Jaho, stage Mireille Laroche, conductor Alain Guingual, Opéra d'Avignon
- 2014 : Concert Opera Gala Saint Petersburg Philharmonia, with Julia Novikova, conductor Jean Ferrandis, Grand Hall Philharmonia Saint Petersburg, Russia
- 2014 : La Bohème by Giacomo Puccini, role Rodolfo, conductor Gintaras Rinkevicius, stage Dalia Ibelhauptaitė, Vilnius City Opera, Lithuania
- 2014 : La Bohème by Giacomo Puccini, role Rodolfo, conductor Andreas Delfs - Ilyich Rivas, stage Phyllida Lloyd - Michael Barker-Caven, Opera North Leeds Manchester, England
- 2014 : La Bohème by Giacomo Puccini, role Rodolfo, conductor Paul Daniel, stage Laurent Laffargue, Opera National de Bordeaux, France
- 2014 : La Bohème by Giacomo Puccini, role Rodolfo, conductor Zsolt Hamar, stage Thorleifur Örn Arnarsson, Opera de Wiesbaden, Germany
- 2014 : Un Amour En Guerre by Caroline Glory, role Jacques, conductor Jacques Blanc, stage Patrick Poivre D'Arvor, Opera de Metz, France
- 2014 : Romeo et Juliette by Charles Gounod, role Roméo, conductor Guido Maria Guido, stage Raúl Falcó, Opera de Nuevo León Monterrey Mexico, Mexico
- 2015 : Les Contes d'Hoffmann by Jacques Offenbach, role Hoffmann, conductor Michael Helmrath, stage Jakob Peters-Messer, Opera Staatstheater Wiesbaden, Germany
- 2015 : Les Mousquetaires au couvent by Louis Varney, role "Gontran de Solanges" stage Jérôme Deschamps, conductor Laurent Campellone, Opéra Comique, Paris, France
- 2015 : Les Contes d'Hoffmann by Jacques Offenbach, role Hoffmann, conductor Hendrik Vestmann / Johannes Pell, stage Renaud Doucet / André Barbe, Opera Bonn, Germany
- 2015 : Manon by Jules Massenet, role Des Grieux, with Patrizia Ciofi, conductor Alexander Joel, stage Renée Auphan / Yves Coudray, Opera Municipal de Marseille, France
- 2015 : Rigoletto by Giuseppe Verdi, role il Duca, conductor Marco Parisotto, stage Ragnar Conde, Teatro Degollado Guadalajara, Mexico
- 2016 : Le Roi d'Ys by Edouard Lalo, role Mylio, conductor José Luis Dominguez, stage Jean-Louis Pichon, Opéra Théâtre de Saint Etienne, Saint-Étienne, France
- 2016 : Jérusalem by Giuseppe Verdi, role Gaston, conductor Will Humburg, stage Francisco Negrin, Opera Bonn, Germany
- 2016: The Tales of Hoffmann by Offenbach, Essen Aalto theater (Germany)
- 2017: La Boheme, Puccini, conductor Paolo Arrivabeni, stage Matthias Hartmann, Grand Théâtre of Geneva
- 2017: Werther, Massenet, conductor David T. Heusel, stage Paul-Emile Fourny, Metz Metropole, Massy, Reims (France)
- 2017: Cyrano, David DiChiera, role Christian, Detroit and Charlotte Opera Carolina (USA)
- 2017: Faust (opera), Faust, Gounod, Wroclaw (Poland) and Vilnius (Lithuania)
- 2017: The Tales of Hoffmann, Offenbach, Dresden Semperoper and Freiburg (Germany)
- 2018: Adriana Lecouvreur, Cilea, role Maurizio, conductor Fabrizio Maria Carminati, stage Davide Livermore, Saint-Etiennes (France)
- 2018: Carmen, Bizet, role Don José, conductor John Fiore, stage Reinhild Hoffmann, Grand Théâtre of Geneva
- 2018: CREATION “Nous sommes éternels” role Dan, composer Pierre Bartholomée, libretto Pierrette Fleutiaux, conductor Patrick Davin, stage Vincent Goethals, Opera Metz Metropole
- 2018 : Manon, Jules Massenet, role Des Grieux, conductor Julius Geniušas, stage Vincent Boussard, Lithuanian National Opera, Vilnius (Lithuania)
- 2019: Werther, Jules Massenet, conductor Guillaume Tourniaire, stage Rosetta Cucchi, La Fenice, Venezia (Italy)
- 2019: Faust, Gounod, conductor Steven White, stage Leleana Blain-Cruz, Omaha (USA)
- 2019: Eugene Oneguin by Piotr Ilitch Tchaïkovski, role Lensky, conductor James Meena, stage Tom Diamond, Charlotte Opera Carolina (USA)
- 2019: Carmen, Bizet, role Don José, conductor José Miguel Perez-Sierra, stage Paul Emile Fourny, Opera Metz Metropole (France)
- 2019: Carmen, Bizet, role Don José, conductor Patrick Lange, stage Uwe Laufenberg, Staatstheater Wiesbaden (Germany)
- 2019: The Tales of Hoffmann, Offenbach, conductor Kent Nagano, Koeln Philharmonie (Germany)
- 2019: La Vestale by Spontini, conductor Bertrand De Billy, stage Johannes Erath, Theater an der Wien (Austria)
- 2020: La Damnation de Faust, Berlioz, role Faust, Metropolitan Opera, USA
- 2020 : Adriana Lecouvreur, Cilea, role Maurizio, conductor Paolo Arrivabeni, stage Davide Livermore, Marseille
- 2020 : Songes d’une nuit d’été, Thomas, rôle Shakespeare, conductor Guillaume Tournaire, stage Stefania Panaghini, Wexford Festival
- 2020 : Carmen, role Don José, Oper Leipzig, Germany
- 2021 : Carmen, Bizet, role Don José, conductor Anu Tali, stage Calixto Bieito, Opera Sevilla, Spain
- 2021 : Carmen, Bizet, role Don José, conductor Omer Meir Wellber, stage Calixto Bieito, Opera Palermo
- 2022 : Carmen, Bizet, role Don José, conductor Antony Hermus, stage Edward Dick, Opera North Leeds
- 2022 : Madama Butterfly, Pinkerton, stage Fabio Ceresa, Opéra de Rennes
- 2022 : Madama Butterfly, role Pinkerton, conductor Rudolf Piehlmayer, stage Fabio Ceresa, Opéras de Nantes, Angers
- 2023 : Andromaque (Gretry), role Pyrrhus, conductor stage, Opéra de Saint Etienne
- 2023 : Hérodiade (Jules Massenet), role Jean, Deutsche Oper am Rhein, Düsseldorf, Germany
- 2023 : La Rondine (Puccini), role Ruggero, Opera North Leeds

== Discography and video ==
=== Discography ===
- Andromaque (Opéra: Grétry), Glossa (2010)
- Songs, Naïve (2011)
- Lodoïska (Opéra: Cherubini), Naïve Ambroisie (2013)

=== Video, DVD ===
- La Bohème: Live in cinemas CGR from Opera National de Bordeaux 2014, Bordeaux, France
- La Traviata: Arte Web Live - Théâtre Royal de La Monnaie De Munt, Dec 2012, Bruxelles, Belgium
- La Bohème: Live in cinemas from Teatro La Fenice February 2011, Venezia, Italy
- Le Roi d’Ys: Lalo, DVD Dynamic (2009), enregistré à l'Opéra Royal de Wallonie à Lièges, Belgium
- La Boite à Musique by Jean-François Zygel, DVD Naïve Records (2007) (vol.1)
- Il Trovatore, Live au Théâtre Antique d'Orange with Roberto Alagna, Les Chorégies d'Orange, July 2006
