= Ilyich =

Ilyich, Ilich or Ilitch is a Russian patronymic meaning "son of Ilya". It most often refers to Vladimir Lenin (Vladimir Ilyich Ulyanov) and multiple places and items named after him. It may refer to:

- Ilich (name)
- Ilyich-Avia, a defunct Ukrainian airline
- Ilyich, Kyrgyzstan, a village in Chuy Region, Kyrgyzstan
- Ilich, Russia, a village in Krasnodar Krai Russia
- Ilyich, a former name of Şərur, a city in Azerbaijan
- Ilyich, a former name of Sharur Rayon in Azerbaijan
