= Ilich (name) =

Ilich, Ilyich, or Ilitch (Russian: Ильич) is a common Russian patronymic meaning "son of Ilya". In some Hispanic countries it is also used as a given name, honoring Vladimir Lenin (Vladimir Ilyich Ulyanov).
Ilich or Ilitch (Macedonian or Russian: Илич, Serbian: Илић) is also a separate non-Russian Slavic surname.
The name may refer to the following people:

Given name

- Ilich Lozano (born 1982), Mexican politician
- Ilich Ramírez Sánchez or Carlos the Jackal (born 1949), Venezuelan terrorist
- Ilyich Rivas (born 1993), Venezuelan conductor

Surname

- Christopher Ilitch (born 1965), American businessman, son of Mike
- Denise Ilitch (born 1955), American businesswoman and lawyer, daughter of Mike
- Fran Ilich, Mexican writer and media artist
- Ivan Illich, (1926–2002), Austrian writer
- Janine Ilitch (born 1972), Australian netball player
- Marian Ilitch (born 1933), American businesswoman, wife of Mike
- Mike Ilitch (1929–2017), American entrepreneur
  - Mike and Marian Ilitch Humanitarian Award
  - Ilitch Holdings
- Olga Ilich (born 1950/51), Canadian politician
- Tode Ilich, Macedonian politician

== See also ==
- The Death of Ivan Ilyich, 1886 novella by Leo Tolstoy
