= Cyrano de Bergerac (play) =

French play by Edmond Rostand

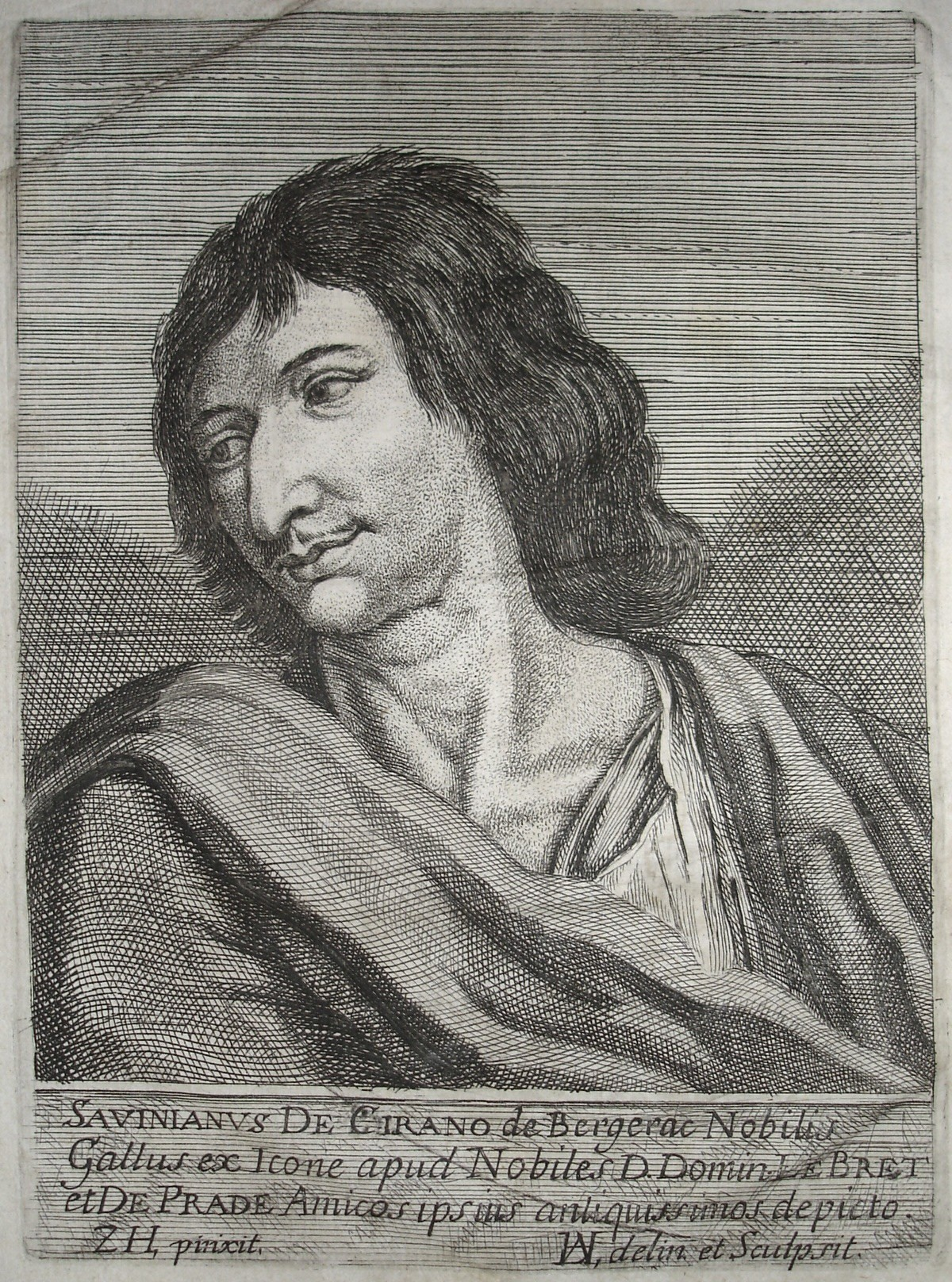
- Cyrano de Bergerac, the man for whom the play is named and upon whose life it is based
- Original language: French
- Written by: Edmond Rostand
- Characters: Cyrano de Bergerac; Roxane; Christian; De Guiche; Le Bret; Ragueneau
- Genre: Romance
- Setting: France, 1640

Premiere
- Date: 28 December 1897

Cyrano de Bergerac (/ˌsɪrənoʊ də ˈbɜːrʒəræk, - ˈbɛər-/ SIRR-ə-noh də BUR-zhə-rak, – BAIR-, French: [siʁano d(ə) bɛʁʒəʁak]) is a French play written in 1897 by Edmond Rostand. The play includes elements of the life of the 17th-century novelist and playwright Cyrano de Bergerac, along with elements of invention and myth. Cyrano's large nose is based on reality (see the accompanying portrait) but in performance of the play is usually exaggerated.

The entire play is written in verse, in rhyming couplets of twelve syllables per line, very close to the classical alexandrine form, but the verses sometimes lack a caesura. It is also meticulously researched, down to the names of the members of the Académie française and the dames précieuses glimpsed before the performance in the first scene.

The play has been translated and performed many times, and it is responsible for introducing the word panache into the English language. The character of Cyrano himself makes reference to "my panache" in the play. The most famous English translations are those by Brian Hooker, Anthony Burgess, and Louis Untermeyer.

== Plot summary ==
Hercule Savinien de Cyrano de Bergerac, a cadet (nobleman serving as a soldier) in the French Army, is a brash, strong-willed man of many talents. In addition to being a remarkable duelist, he is a gifted, joyful poet who also plays music. However, he has an obnoxiously large nose, which causes him to doubt himself. This doubt prevents him from expressing his love for his distant cousin, the beautiful and intellectual Roxane, as he believes that his ugliness would bar him from the "dream of being loved by even an ugly woman." Roxane loves the fair Christian de Neuvillette, who is too tongue-tied to romance her. Cyrano famously writes love letters to Roxane, pretending to be Christian.

=== Act I – A Performance at the Hôtel de Bourgogne ===
The play opens in Paris, 1640, in the theatre of the Hôtel de Bourgogne. Members of the audience slowly arrive, representing a cross-section of Parisian society from pickpockets to nobility. Christian de Neuvillette, a handsome new cadet, arrives with Lignière, a drunkard who he hopes will identify the young woman with whom he has fallen in love. Lignière recognizes her as Roxane, and he tells Christian about her and the Count de Guiche's scheme to marry her off to the compliant Viscount Valvert. Meanwhile, Ragueneau and Le Bret are expecting Cyrano de Bergerac, who has, without any authority, banished the actor Montfleury from the stage for a month. After Lignière leaves, Christian catches a pickpocket who, in return for his freedom, tells him of a plot against Lignière. Christian departs to try to warn him.

The play "Clorise" begins with Montfleury's entrance. Cyrano disrupts the play, forces Montfleury off stage, and compensates the manager for the loss of admission fees. The crowd is going to disperse when Cyrano lashes out at a pesky busybody, then is confronted by Valvert and duels with him while composing a ballade, wounding (and possibly killing) him as he ends the refrain (as promised, he ends each refrain with Qu'à la fin de l'envoi, je touche!: "Then, as I end the refrain, thrust home!") When the crowd has cleared the theater, Cyrano and Le Bret remain behind, and Cyrano confesses his love for Roxane. Roxane's duenna then arrives, and asks where Roxane may meet Cyrano privately. Lignière is then brought to Cyrano, having learned that one hundred hired thugs are waiting to ambush him on his way home. Cyrano, now emboldened, vows to take on the entire mob single-handed, and he leads a procession of officers, actors and musicians to the Porte de Nesle.

=== Act II – The Poets' Cookshop ===
The next morning, at Ragueneau's bake shop, Ragueneau supervises various apprentice cooks in their preparations. Cyrano arrives, anxious about his meeting with Roxane. He is followed by a musketeer, a paramour of Ragueneau's domineering wife Lise, then the regular gathering of impoverished poets who take advantage of Ragueneau's hospitality and love for poetry. Cyrano composes a letter to Roxane expressing his deep and unconditional love for her, warns Lise about her indiscretion with the musketeer and, when Roxane arrives, signals Ragueneau to leave them alone.

Roxane and Cyrano talk privately as she bandages his hand (injured from the fracas at the Port de Nesle); she thanks him for defeating Valvert at the theater, and talks about a man with whom she has fallen in love. Cyrano thinks that she is talking about himself at first, and is ecstatic, but Roxane describes her beloved as "handsome," and tells him that she is in love with Christian de Neuvillette. Roxane fears for Christian's safety in the predominantly Gascon company of cadets, and asks Cyrano to befriend and protect him. This he agrees to do.

After she leaves, Cyrano's captain arrives with the cadets to congratulate him on his victory the previous night. They are followed by a huge crowd, including de Guiche and his entourage, but Cyrano soon drives them away. Le Bret takes him aside and chastises him for his behavior, but Cyrano responds haughtily. The Cadets press him to tell the story of the fight, teasing the newcomer Christian de Neuvillette. When Cyrano recounts the tale, Christian displays his own form of courage by interjecting several times with references to Cyrano's nose. Cyrano is angry, but remembering his promise to Roxane, holds in his temper.

Eventually Cyrano explodes at the insults, the shop is evacuated, and Cyrano reveals his identity as Roxane's cousin. Christian confesses his love for Roxane but also his inability to woo her because of what he feels is a lack of intellect and wit. When Cyrano tells Christian that Roxane expects a letter from him, Christian is despondent, having no eloquence in such matters. Cyrano then offers his services, including his own unsigned letter to Roxane. The Cadets and others return to find the two men embracing, and are flabbergasted. The musketeer from before, now thinking it was safe to do so, teases Cyrano about his nose and receives a slap in the face, amusing the Cadets.

=== Act III – Roxane's Kiss ===
Outside Roxane's house Ragueneau is conversing with Roxane's duenna. When Cyrano arrives, Roxane descends and they talk about Christian: Roxane says that Christian's letters have been breathtaking—he is more intellectual than even Cyrano, she declares. She also says that she loves Christian.

When de Guiche arrives, Cyrano hides inside Roxane's house. De Guiche tells Roxane that he has come to say farewell. He has been appointed a colonel of a regiment leaving that night to fight in the war with Spain. He mentions that the regiment includes Cyrano's unit, and grimly predicts that he and Cyrano will have a reckoning with each other. Afraid for Christian's safety if he should go to the front, Roxane quickly suggests that the best way for de Guiche to seek revenge on Cyrano would be for him to leave Cyrano and his cadets behind while the rest of the regiment achieves military glory. After much flirtation from Roxane, de Guiche believes he should stay close by, concealed in a local monastery. When Roxane implies that she would feel more for de Guiche if he went to war, he agrees to march on steadfastly, leaving Cyrano and his cadets behind. He leaves, and Roxane makes the duenna promise she will not tell Cyrano that Roxane has robbed him of a chance to go to war.

Roxane expects Christian to visit her, and tells the duenna to make him wait if he does. Cyrano presses Roxane to disclose that, instead of questioning Christian on any particular subject, she plans to make Christian improvise about love. Although he tells Christian the details of her plot, when Roxane and her duenna leave, he calls for Christian who has been waiting nearby. Cyrano tries to prepare Christian for his meeting with Roxane, urging him to remember lines Cyrano has written. Christian however refuses saying he wants to speak to Roxane in his own words. Cyrano bows to this saying, "Speak for yourself, sir."

During their meeting Christian makes a fool of himself trying to speak seductively to Roxane. Roxane storms into her house, confused and angry. Thinking quickly, Cyrano makes Christian stand in front of Roxane's balcony and speak to her while Cyrano stands under the balcony whispering to Christian what to say. Eventually, Cyrano shoves Christian aside and, under cover of darkness, pretends to be Christian, wooing Roxane himself. In the process, he wins a kiss for Christian.

Roxane and Christian are secretly married by a Capuchin. Outside, Cyrano meets de Guiche. Cyrano, his face concealed, impersonates a madman, with a tale of a trip to the Moon. De Guiche is fascinated, and delays his journey to hear more. When Cyrano finally reveals his face, de Guiche suggests Cyrano should write a book.

The newly wed couple's happiness is short-lived: de Guiche, angry to have lost Roxane, declares that he is sending the Cadets of Gascony to the front lines of the war with Spain. De Guiche triumphantly tells Cyrano that the wedding night will have to wait. Under his breath, Cyrano remarks that the news fails to upset him.

Roxane, afraid for Christian, urges Cyrano to promise to keep him safe, out of dangerous situations, dry and warm, and faithful. Cyrano says that he will do what he can but that he cannot promise anything. Roxane begs Cyrano to promise to make Christian write to her every day. Brightening, Cyrano announces confidently that he can promise that.

=== Act IV – The Gascon Cadets ===
The Siege of Arras (1640). The Gascon Cadets are among many French forces now cut off by the Spanish, and are starving. Cyrano, meanwhile, has been writing in Christian's name to Roxane twice daily, smuggling the letters across enemy lines. De Guiche, whom the Cadets despise, arrives and chastises them; Cyrano responds with his usual bravura, and de Guiche then signals a spy to tell the Spanish to attack the Cadets, informing them that they must hold the line until relief arrives. Then a coach arrives, and Roxane emerges from it. She tells how she was able to flirt her way through the Spanish lines. Cyrano tells Christian about the letters, and provides him a farewell letter to give to Roxane if he dies. After de Guiche departs, Roxane provides plenty of food and drink to the cadets with the assistance of the coach's driver, Ragueneau. De Guiche attempts for a second time to convince Roxane to leave the battlefield. When she refuses, de Guiche says he will not leave a lady behind. This impresses the cadets who offer him their leftovers, which de Guiche declines, but he ends up catching the cadets' accent which makes him even more popular with them. Roxane also tells Christian that, because of the letters, she has grown to love him for his soul alone, and would still love him even if he were ugly.

Christian tells this to Cyrano, and then persuades Cyrano to tell Roxane the truth about the letters, saying he has to be loved for "the fool that he is" to be truly loved at all. Cyrano disbelieves what Christian claims Roxane has said, until she tells him so as well. But, before Cyrano can tell her the truth, Christian is brought back to the camp, having been fatally shot. Cyrano decides that, in order to preserve Roxane's image of an eloquent Christian, he cannot tell her the truth. The battle ensues, a distraught Roxane collapses and is carried off by de Guiche and Ragueneau, and Cyrano rallies the Cadets to hold off the Spanish until relief arrives.

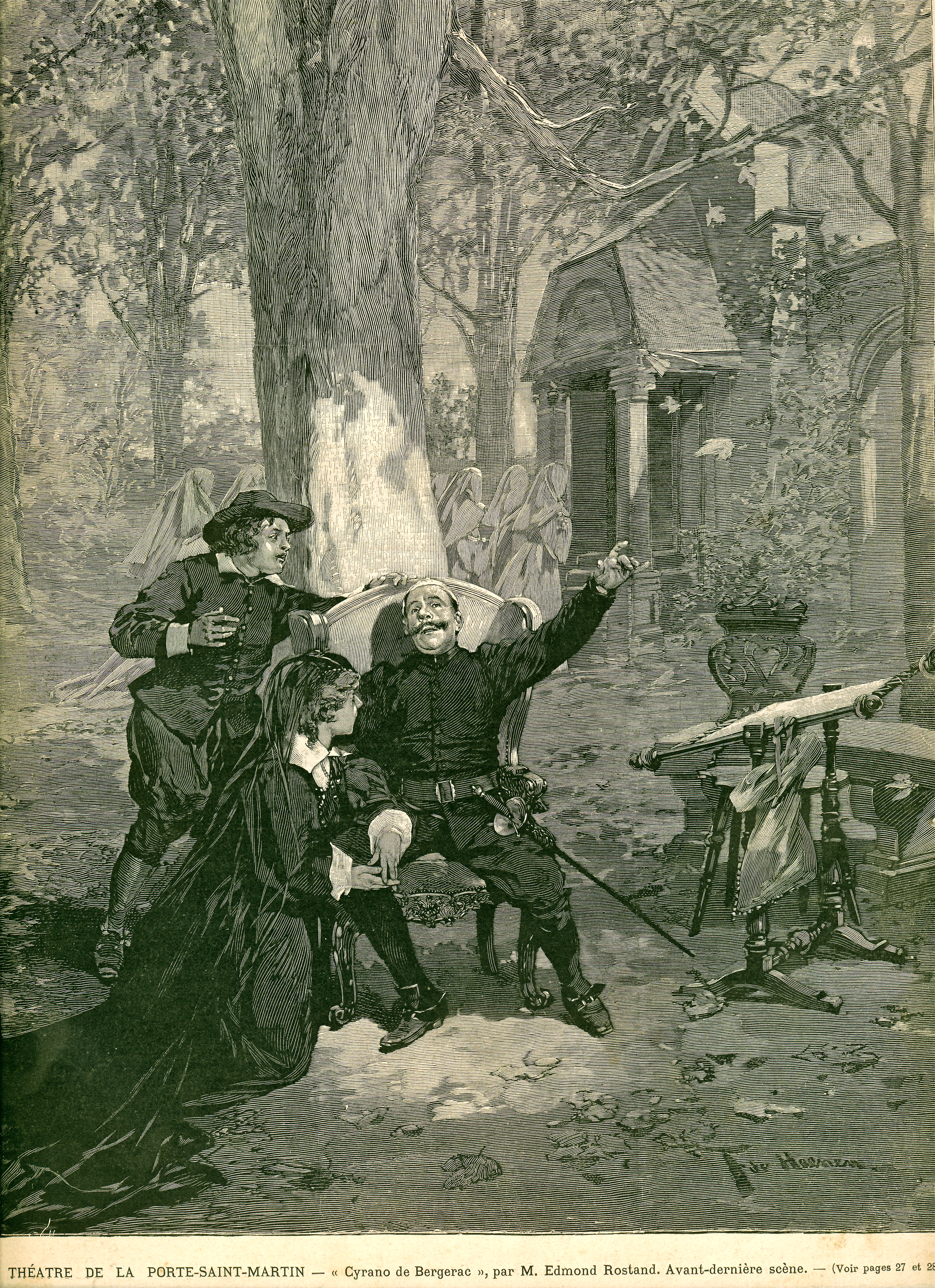
The second-to-last scene. First performance of the play. Published in "l'illustration", 8 January 1898

=== Act V – Cyrano's Gazette ===
Fifteen years later, at a convent outside Paris. Roxane now resides here, constantly mourning her beloved Christian. She is visited by de Guiche, who is now a good friend and sees Cyrano as an equal (and has been promoted to duke), Le Bret, and Ragueneau (who has lost his wife and bakery, and is now a candlelighter for Molière), and she expects Cyrano to come by as he always has with news of the outside world. On this day, however, he has been mortally wounded by someone who dropped a huge log on his head from a tall building. Upon arriving to deliver his "gazette" to Roxane, knowing it will be his last, he asks Roxane if he can read "Christian's" farewell letter. She gives it to him, and he reads it aloud as it grows dark. Listening to his voice, she realizes that it is Cyrano who was the author of all the letters, but Cyrano denies this until he cannot hide it. Ragueneau and Le Bret return, telling Roxane of Cyrano's injury. While Cyrano grows delirious, his friends weep and Roxane tells him that she loves him. He combats various foes, half imaginary and half symbolic, conceding that he has lost all but one important thing – his panache – as he dies in Le Bret's and Ragueneau's arms.

== Stage history ==
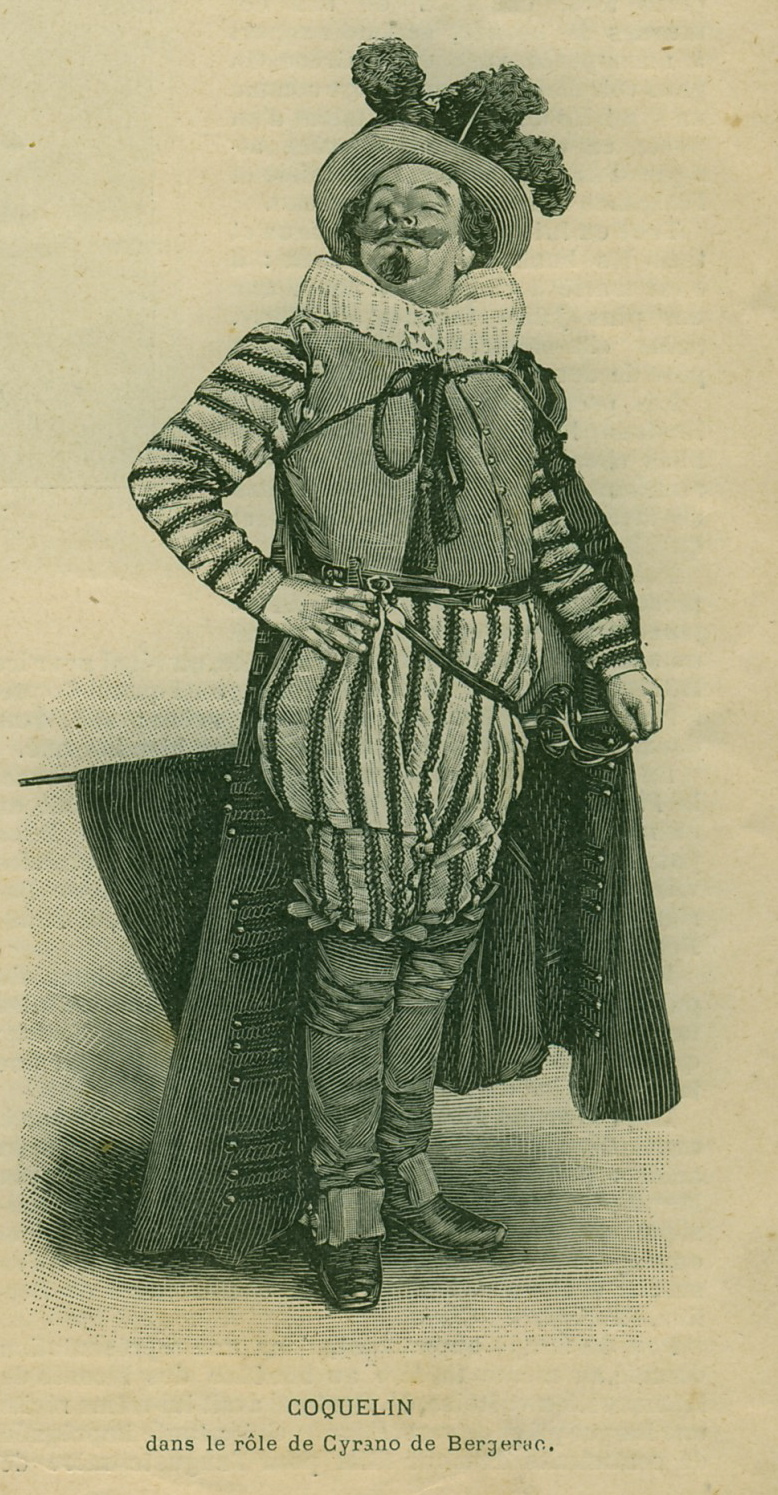
Benoît-Constant Coquelin created the role of Cyrano de Bergerac (1897)

On 27 December 1897, the curtain rose at the Théâtre de la Porte Saint-Martin, and the audience was pleasantly surprised. A full hour after the curtain fell, the audience was still applauding. The original Cyrano was Constant Coquelin, who played it over 410 times at said theatre and later toured North America in the role. The original production had sets designed by Marcel Jambon and his associates Brard and Alexandre Bailly (Acts I, III and V), Eugène Carpezat (Act II), and Alfred Lemeunier (Act IV). The earliest touring production of Cyrano was set up by Charles Moncharmont and Maurice Luguet. It was premiered in Monte Carlo on 29 March 1898, and subsequently presented in France, Belgium, Switzerland, Austria, Hungary, Serbia, Romania, Bulgaria, Turkey, Egypt, Greece, Italy, Algeria, Tunisia and Spain. Special, transportable sets emulating the Parisian production were created for this tour by Albert Dubosq:

La troupe qui interprétera Cyrano de Bergerac se composera de quarante personnes. Les costumes et les décors seront identiques à ceux de la Porte Saint-Martin; les costumes, au nombre de deux cent cinquante, faits sur mesure, les armes, cartonnages, tout le matériel seront exécutés par les fournisseurs de ce théâtre; les décors seront brossés par Dubosq qui est allé, ces jours derniers, s'entendre à Paris avec les entrepreneurs de la tournée. ... la troupe voyage avec tout un matériel de décors à appliques, charnières, pièces démontables qui, pouvant se planter sur n'importe quelle scène et se divisant en tous petits fragments, s'installe aisément dans des caisses, sans peser relativement trop lourd et dépasser les dimensions admises par les chemins de fer.

[The troupe that will perform Cyrano de Bergerac will comprise forty people. The costumes and decorations will be identical to those of the Porte Saint-Martin; the costumes, two hundred and fifty in number, made to measure, the weapons, cardboard boxes, all the material will be made by the suppliers of this theater; the sets will be painted by Dubosq who, in recent days, has been to Paris to get along with the touring entrepreneurs. ... the troupe travels with a whole set of sconces, hinges, removable parts which, being able to be planted on any stage and being divided into very small fragments, can be easily installed in crates, without weighing relatively too much heavy and exceed the dimensions permitted by railways.]

— L'Eventail, 6 March and 17 April 1898

Richard Mansfield was the first actor to play Cyrano in the United States in an English translation.

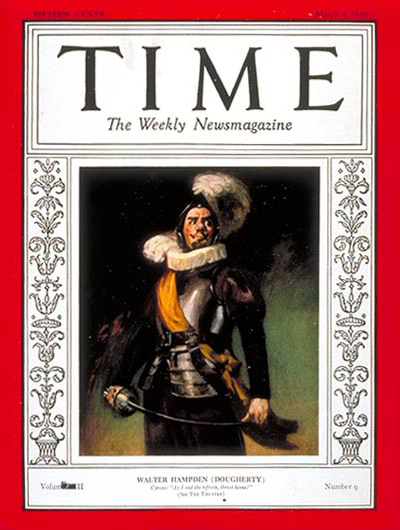
Walter Hampden on the cover of Time in 1929, while he was the producer, director, star and theatre manager of a Broadway revival of Cyrano de Bergerac

The longest-running Broadway production ran 232 performances in 1923 and starred Walter Hampden, who returned to the role on the Great White Way in 1926, 1928, 1932, and 1936. Hampden used the 1923 Brian Hooker translation prepared especially for him, which became such a classic in itself that it was used by virtually every English-speaking Cyrano until the mid-1980s. In 1946 Hampden passed the torch to José Ferrer, who won a Tony Award for playing Cyrano in a much-praised Broadway staging, the highlight of which was a special benefit performance in which Ferrer played the title role for the first four acts and Hampden (then in his mid-sixties) assumed it for the fifth. Ferrer reprised the role on live television in 1949 and 1955, and in a 1950 film version for which he won the Academy Award for Best Actor. It became Ferrer's most famous role.

Other notable English-speaking Cyranos were Ralph Richardson, DeVeren Bookwalter, Derek Jacobi, Michael Kanarek, Richard Chamberlain, and Christopher Plummer, who played the part in Rostand's play and won a Tony Award for the 1973 musical adaptation. Kevin Kline played the role in a Broadway production in 2007, with Jennifer Garner playing Roxane and Daniel Sunjata as Christian. A taped version of the production was broadcast on PBS's Great Performances in 2009. In 2018, David Serero was the first French actor to play Cyrano in America in the English language.

=== Later stage versions ===
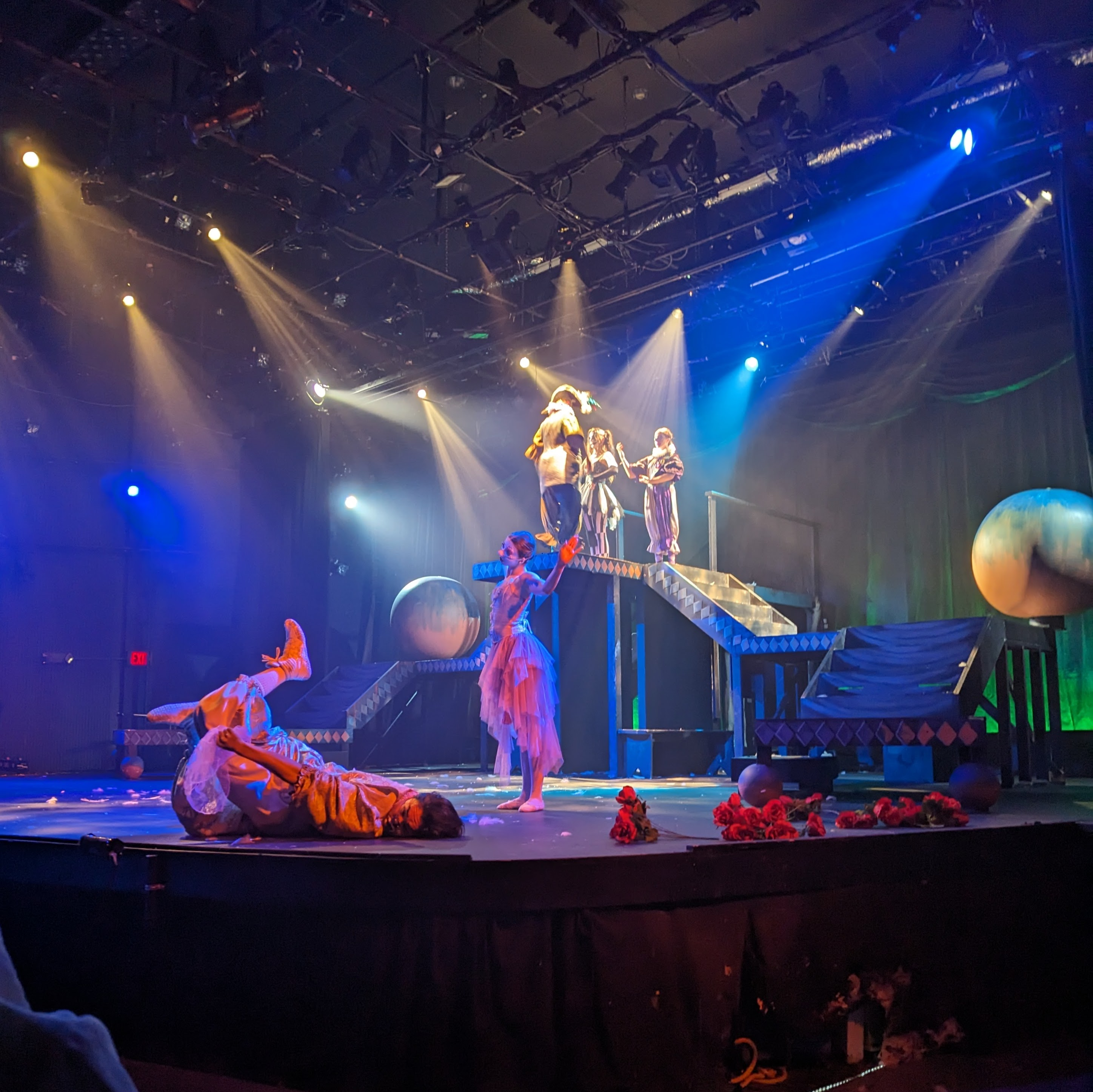
2023 adaptation at Synetic Theater.

- 1962–1963 Stratford Shakespeare Festival performed the play for two seasons, with John Colicos in the title role.
- 1970 Anthony Burgess wrote a new translation and adaptation of Cyrano de Bergerac, which had its world premiere at the Guthrie Theater in Minneapolis. Paul Hecht was Cyrano. Also in the cast were Len Cariou as Christian, and Roberta Maxwell as Roxane. A later production was the Royal Shakespeare Company's acclaimed 1983 stage production, starring Derek Jacobi as Cyrano and Alice Krige (later Sinéad Cusack) as Roxane, which was videotaped and broadcast on television in 1985. For this production, Burgess very significantly reworked his earlier translation; both Burgess translations have appeared in book form.
- 1977 A condensed version of Rostand's play, in prose, was written by the Scottish writer Tom Gallacher and performed at the Pitlochry Festival Theatre.
- 1982–1983 The Shaw Festival in Niagara-on-the-Lake, Ontario, produced the play for two seasons, directed by Derek Goldby and starring Heath Lamberts.
- 1983–1985 Emily Frankel wrote a condensed prose adaptation for her husband John Cullum which was first performed at Syracuse Stage, directed by Arthur Storch in 1983, then at Atlanta's Alliance Theatre in 1984. A national tour in 1985–1986 concluded with a month's stay at Baltimore's Morris Mechanic Theatre.
- 1989 Off Broadway the play has been staged several times, including a New York City parks tour starring Frank Muller, produced by the Riverside Shakespeare Company.
- 1990 Staged by the Tanghalang Pilipino with the translation written by Soc Rodrigo, and directed by Tony Mabesa.
- 1992 John Wells wrote an adaptation called Cyrano, first presented at the Haymarket Theatre in London.
- 1992 Edwin Morgan wrote a translation in Scots verse, which was first performed by the Communicado Theatre Company. The National Theatre of Scotland also produced this version in 2018.
- 1994 The Stratford Shakespeare Festival presented the play, directed by Derek Goldby and starring Colm Feore.
- 1995 Jatinder Verma wrote and directed an adaptation in English, Hindi and Urdu set in 1930s India, starring Naseeruddin Shah. The play opened at the National Theatre, London, in October.
- 1997 Pierre Lebeau starred in the Théâtre du Nouveau Monde's 1996 production. A great success, the January production was reprised in July (without air conditioning). In November, Antony Sher performed the title role in the Lyric Theatre's production directed by partner Gregory Doran. Frank Langella created and directed and performed the title role in a stripped-down version of the play simply titled Cyrano.
- 2001 David Grapes II starred as Cyrano in an adaptation of Cyrano de Bergerac by Robert Neblett and Todd Olson at the Tennessee Repertory Theatre in Nashville, TN
- 2004 Barksdale Theatre in Richmond began its 50th-anniversary season with a production of Emily Frankel's Cyrano, starring David Bridgewater.
- 2005 An adaptation written in verse by Barry Kornhauser was produced by The Shakespeare Theatre in Washington, DC, under the direction of Artistic Director Michael Kahn, and starring Geraint Wyn Davies, went on to become the most highly honored of DC's plays that year, winning multiple Helen Hayes Awards, including "Outstanding Play."
- 2007 A translation of the play by Ranjit Bolt opened at Bristol Old Vic in May. Sound & Fury, a Los Angeles-based comedy trio, presented their parody of the play, called Cyranose! in L.A. at Café-Club Fais Do-Do in September 2007. It was also filmed and released on DVD.
- 2009 The Stratford Shakespeare Festival again performed the play during their 2009 season, with Colm Feore returning in the title role, directed by Donna Feore. This production was unique in that it combined the translation by Anthony Burgess with portions of the original French text, taking advantage of Canadian bilingualism for dramatic effect.
- 2011 A translation by Michael Hollinger had its premier at the Folger Theatre, Washington, D.C., directed by Aaron Posner and produced by Janet Griffin.
- 2012 Roundabout Theatre Company presented a production of Cyrano de Bergerac from 11 October to 25 November with Douglas Hodge in the lead at the American Airlines Theatre for a limited engagement. The production was directed by Jamie Lloyd, who would later direct a more radical reinterpretation of the play.
- 2013 The Hudson Shakespeare Company of New Jersey presented a version directed by Gene Simakowicz as part of their annual Shakespeare in the Parks tour. The version starred Jon Ciccareli as Cyrano, Laura Barbiea as Roxane and Matt Hansen as Christian.
- 2013 The play was adapted by Glyn Maxwell and performed at Grosvenor Park Open Air Theatre in Chester
- 2014 the Sydney Theatre Company presented a version of the play adapted by Andrew Upton with Richard Roxburgh in the lead role, Eryn Jean Norvill as Roxane and Julia Zemiro as Duenna.
- 2015 A gender-swapped translation was adapted and directed by Professor Doug Zschiegner with Niagara University Theatre titled, CyranA.
- 2018 The Gloucester Stage Company premiered an adaptation for five actors by Jason O'Connell and Brenda Withers. This adaptation was performed at the Hudson Valley Shakespeare Festival during the summer of 2019.
- 2019 The Guthrie Theater in Minneapolis produced an adapted version of the show.
- 2019 The Michigan Shakespeare Festival, Jackson, and Canton MI, Directed by Janice L. Blixt.
- 2019 The Shaw Festival again produced the play for the 2019 season, with a translation by Kate Hennig, directed by Chris Abraham, and starring Tom Rooney.
- 2019 An adaptation by Martin Crimp produced by The Jamie Lloyd Company and starring James McAvoy started at the Playhouse Theatre in London on 27 November. This adaptation returned in 2022, initially playing at the Harold Pinter Theatre in London before transferring to the Theatre Royal Glasgow and then the Brooklyn Academy of Music in New York City.
- 2022 Melbourne Theatre Company produced a modernized adaptation of the play written by Virginia Gay, who also starred as a gender-flipped Cyrano.
- 2023 Synetic Theater produced a silent physical theater adaptation.
- 2023 University of St Andrews's Performing Arts Fund, Mermaids, staged a comedic adaptation written by student Kilda Kennedy, wherein Christian and numerous minor characters were performed with puppets, titled Cyrano de Puppet.
- 2024 A version adapted by Martin Crimp was produced at the Pasadena Playhouse.
- 2025 A version co-adapted by Simon Evans and Debris Stevenson, directed by Evans for the Royal Shakespeare Company, performed in the Swan Theatre, Stratford-upon-Avon. Adrian Lester and Susannah Fielding starred as Cyrano and Roxane. It was a combination of the original text in rhyming couplets and modern English. The production transferred to London's West End at the Noël Coward Theatre for a limited run from June to September 2026 with Lester and Fielding reprising their roles.

== Translations ==
- Howard Thayer Kingsbury (1898) - blank verse; performed by Richard Mansfield
- Gladys Thomas and Mary F. Guillemard (1898) - prose
- Charles Renauld (1898) - prose
- Gertrude Hall (1898) - prose
- Mustafa Lutfi al-Manfaluti into Arabic.
- Brian Hooker (1923) - blank verse
- Humbert Wolfe (1941) - prose
- Anthony Burgess (1971) - verse and prose
- Lowell Blair (1972) - prose
- Christopher Fry (1975) - verse
- Soc Rodrigo (1991) into Filipino
- Edwin Morgan (Glaswegian Scots)(1992)
- Eric Merrill Budd (2005) - "poetic prose"
- Derek Mahon (2004) - blank verse
- Carol Clark (2006) - "a loose five beat line..." in blank verse
- Brian Vinero (2021) - rhymed verse

== Direct adaptations ==
=== Film ===
Cyrano de Bergerac (1900), produced for the Phono-Cinéma, an early sound film method, with frames colored by a stencil process; here the original Benoît-Constant Coquelin performs the duel in Act 1.

The English 1950 film Cyrano de Bergerac.

- Cyrano de Bergerac (1925), a silent, French-Italian film version of the play, using the Pathé Stencil Color process, starring Pierre Magnier
- Cyrano de Bergerac (1946), a relatively unknown French-language black-and-white film version starring Claude Dauphin. Posters and film stills give the impression that the set designs and costumes of the 1950 film may have been modeled after this version.
- Cyrano de Bergerac (1950), the first English-language adaptation of the play. José Ferrer played the title role. The film was made on a low budget, but still lost money. Nevertheless, it received critical acclaim, won Ferrer the Academy Award for Best Actor. Mala Powers co-starred as Roxane and William Prince as Christian. Ferrer reprised the role in Cyrano and d'Artagnan, a 1964 film directed by Abel Gance.
- Cyrano de Bergerac (1990), a French adaptation with Gérard Depardieu in the title role. It won Best Film, Best Director (for Jean-Paul Rappeneau) and Best Actor (for Depardieu) in the French Césars. Franca Squarciapino won an Oscar, a Bafta and a César for her costume design for the film.
- Cyrano (2021), an American-British musical drama film directed by Joe Wright, based on Erica Schmidt's 2018 stage musical. It stars Peter Dinklage as Cyrano, Haley Bennett as Roxane, Kelvin Harrison Jr. as Christian and Ben Mendelsohn as De Guiche. Instead of having an outsized nose, Cyrano in this version is a dwarf.

=== Television ===
- January 9, 1949, The Philco Television Playhouse's one-hour adaptation starred José Ferrer in his TV debut.
- 1968 adaptation by the BBC as a Play of the Month.
- 1974 TV production with Peter Donat as Cyrano.

=== Radio ===
- Ralph Richardson starred as Cyrano in the BBC Home Service production translated by Brian Hooker and adapted for radio by John Powell in July 1966.
- Len Cariou and Roberta Maxwell starred in a 1980 CBC Television version directed by Peabody-winner Yuri Rasovsky.
- Kenneth Branagh starred as Cyrano, Jodhi May as Roxane, and Tom Hiddleston as Christian, in a 2008 BBC Radio 3 production using the Anthony Burgess translation and directed by David Timson. This production first aired on BBC Radio 3 on 23 March 2008 and was re-broadcast on 4 April 2010.
- Tom Burke and Emily Pithon starred in a 2015 BBC Radio 4 version for 15 Minute Drama, spanning five 15-minute episodes. It was adapted by Glyn Maxwell, and directed by Susan Roberts.

In addition to his BBC Radio performance, Richardson starred in a Caedmon Records production with Anna Massey.

=== Opera ===
- Victor Herbert's unsuccessful 1899 operetta Cyrano de Bergerac, performed at the Knickerbocker Theatre in New York, with a book by Stuart Reed based on the play and lyrics by Harry B. Smith, was one of Herbert's few failures.
- Walter Damrosch's Cyrano premiered in 1913 at the Metropolitan Opera.
- An opera in French, Cyrano de Bergerac, whose libretto by Henri Caïn is based on Rostand's words, was composed by the Italian Franco Alfano and was first presented in an Italian translation in 1936. The original French version has been revived in productions including the Opéra national de Montpellier with Roberto Alagna in 2003, and a 2005 Metropolitan Opera production with Plácido Domingo in the title role.
- Eino Tamberg composed the opera Cyrano de Bergerac in 1974, to a libretto in Estonian by Jaan Kross, based on Rostand's play.
- The opera Cyrano by David DiChiera to a libretto by Bernard Uzan premiered at the Michigan Opera Theatre on 13 October 2007.

=== Musical theatre ===
- Cyrano, a 1973 musical adaptation by Anthony Burgess starring Christopher Plummer, appeared in Boston and then on Broadway. Plummer won a Tony Award for his performance, but the musical was nonetheless a commercial failure.
- Cyrano: The Musical, a musical with music by Ad van Dijk, with an original book and lyrics (in Dutch) by Koen van Dijk. For the Broadway production, English lyrics were provided by Peter Reeves, with additional lyrics by Sheldon Harnick. Produced by Joop van den Ende, the original Dutch production Cyrano de Musical, starring Bill van Dijk as Cyrano, premiered in 1992 at the Stadsschouwburg (City Theatre) in Amsterdam where it became one of the most successful Dutch musicals in history. The Broadway production, directed by Eddy Habbema, opened on November 21, 1993, at the Neil Simon Theatre, where it ran for 137 performances. The cast included Bill van Dijk as Cyrano, Anne Runolfsson as Roxane, and Paul Anthony Stewart as Christian.
- Cyrano, a 1993 Danish-language musical stage adaptation of the play by singer-songwriter Sebastian, opened at Gladsaxe Teater. In 1994, the musical opened at Theater des Westens, Berlin. Sebastian wrote additional songs for a 2000 production known as Den Nye Cyrano (lit. 'The New Cyrano') produced by the amateur theatre company Mastodonterne. The musical has since been produced frequently by several Danish theatre companies.
- The Furious Gasconian, a 1993 musical by Azerbaijani composer Gara Garayev, is based on the play.
- Cyrano de Bergerac, a 2009 musical with book and lyrics by Leslie Bricusse and music by Frank Wildhorn, has been performed in Tokyo and Seoul.
- Madeline Sunshine transposed the story to New York's Little Italy in her adaptation, Serrano: The Musical, with music by Robert Tepper. The 2015 Los Angeles production was directed by Joel Zwick and choreographed by Peggy Hickey.
- C., a 2016 musical with music by Robert Elhai, and book and lyrics by Bradley Greenwald, premiered at the Ritz Theater in Minneapolis. The production was directed by the company's founder and artistic director Peter Rothstein, and starred Greenwald as Cyrano.
- Cyrano, a 2018 musical written and directed by Erica Schmidt, with music by the band The National, starring Schmidt's husband Peter Dinklage, premiered at the Daryl Roth Theatre in New York. Dinklage reprised the role in a 2021 film adaptation of the musical, for which he was nominated for the Golden Globe Award for Best Actor in a Musical or Comedy.

== Loose adaptations ==
=== Film ===
- Love Letters (1945) is a screen adaptation by novelist Ayn Rand of the book Pity My Simplicity by Christopher Massie which converted his story into an adaptation of Rostand's play. The heroine, Singleton (played by Jennifer Jones), falls in love with a soldier during World War II, believing him to be the author of certain love letters that had been written for him by another soldier at the front. In this version, the heroine discovers the identity of the true author (played by Joseph Cotten) in time for the protagonists to experience a happy ending. The film, produced by Hal Wallis, was a commercial success and earned four nominations for Academy Awards, including that of Jones for Best Actress. The musical score by Victor Young was nominated for an Oscar, and featured the melody of the hit song "Love Letters", which has been recorded by numerous artists since.
- Life of an Expert Swordsman (1959; released in the English-language market as Samurai Saga) is a samurai film adaptation by Hiroshi Inagaki, and starring Toshiro Mifune in the Cyrano role.
- The Wonderful World of Puss 'n Boots (1969), directed by Kimio Yabuki, contains a scene where the protagonist Pierre is supported by the titular Puss 'n Boots while professing his love to his love interest on a balcony above.
- Electric Dreams (1984) is the story of a personal computer that becomes self-aware, falls in love with a musician, and then wins her for his socially awkward owner.
- Roxanne (1987), a comedy version with a happy ending added, starring Steve Martin as fire chief Charles "C.D." Bales, Daryl Hannah as graduate astronomy student Roxanne Kowalski, and Rick Rossovich as Chris, a younger firefighter.
- Saajan (1991), a disabled poet helps the brother from his adopting family fall in love with the woman he also loves, by writing letters on his behalf, starring Sanjay Dutt, Salman Khan and Madhuri Dixit.
- The Truth About Cats and Dogs (1996) is a romantic comedy, gender-swapped modern retelling starring Janeane Garofalo, Uma Thurman, and Ben Chaplin
- Whatever It Takes (2000), starring Shane West, James Franco and Marla Sokoloff.
- Mujhse Dosti Karoge! (2002), a woman secretly in love with her childhood friend writes letters on another's behalf, makes him fall for her, but after learning the other woman loves him too, sacrifices her own love to help her win him over, starring Hrithik Roshan, Rani Mukherji and Kareena Kapoor Khan.
- The Ugly Truth (2009) is a romantic comedy film starring Katherine Heigl and Gerard Butler, featuring a scene at a baseball game where Mike (Butler) advises remotely via radio Abby (Heigl) in an earpiece, telling her what to say to her date to win him.
- Let It Shine (2012) is a Disney Channel Original Movie loosely based on this story. It stars an aspiring teenage musician named Cyrus DeBarge who allows his friend, Kris, to use his music to win over their childhood friend, Roxie, who is a professional singer.
- Oohalu Gusagusalade (2014), a Telugu romantic comedy movie, is an adaptation of the play.
- Sierra Burgess Is a Loser (2018) is a Netflix original movie that is a gender-swapped adaptation, set at a high school.
- #Roxy (2018) is a Canadian romantic comedy film and a modern retelling.
- The Most Beautiful Girl in the World (2018) is a German comedy/romance film and in the 21st century.
- Old Boys (2018) is a British comedy film in which an awkward but imaginative pupil, Amberson (Alex Lawther) helps the handsome but dim school-hero Winchester (Jonah Hauer-King) to pursue Agnes (Pauline Etienne), the fiery daughter of a visiting French teacher.
- The Half of It (2020) is a Netflix original movie, retelling the story through the lens of a lesbian teenage Chinese-American girl living in a small town.

=== Television ===
- In the 1966 episode "One Monkee Shy" of The Monkees, Peter Tork gets help wooing Valerie from his three bandmates in the balcony scene
- The 1972 episode "Cyrano de Brady" of The Brady Bunch adapts the balcony scene, with Peter trying to woo his crush, while being fed the right words to say from Greg, hiding in the bushes.
- The 1982 episode "Cyrano de Jackson" of Diff'rent Strokes also adapts the balcony scene, with Arnold feeding lines to his friend Dudley through an earpiece.
- The 1996 episode "Looking for par'Mach in All the Wrong Places" of Star Trek: Deep Space Nine is adapted from the story.

=== Musical theatre ===
- The 2006 musical Calvin Berger by Barry Wyner sets the story in a modern-day high school.
- Cyrano: Isang Sarsuwela is a 2010 Filipino musical adaptation based from the Filipino translation of Soc Rodrigo, with songs by William Manzano. It is set in the Philippines during World War II. Its first theatrical run was in 2010–2011, directed by Pat Valera. It re-ran from 2016 to 2018, with the new title Mula sa Buwan. It later on had a rerun after the enhanced community quarantine for the COVID-19 pandemic at the Samsung Performing Arts Theater in Circuit Makati.

== Other cultural references to the play ==
- In the 1988 film Short Circuit 2, one of the main characters, Ben Jahveri, is fed lines from the robotic character Johnny 5, which are transmitted to a digital billboard for Ben to read. Ben is trying to win the affections of the character Sandy Banatoni.
- In the 1991 episode "Communicable Theater" of the sitcom Roseanne character Jackie gets in trouble when she has to perform the lead role in a community production of "Cyrano de Bergerac" and doesn't know her lines.
- The 1991 episode "The Nth Degree" of Star Trek: The Next Generation features Reg Barclay and Dr. Crusher performing a scene from Cyrano de Bergerac in the theater room before a handful of the crew.
- The Blues Traveler song "Sweet Pain" from the 1991 album Travelers and Thieves begins with a reference to Cyrano de Bergerac, using Cyrano's unattainable love as a reference to the songs theme of sweet pain.
- Cyrano de Bergerac is one of the two plays "performed" in the 1995 comedic play Moon Over Buffalo by Ken Ludwig, the other being Private Lives.
- In the 1999 episode Cyrano de Beckerac of Becker, the protagonist gives dating advice to one of his patients who is seeing his friend and secret love interest Reggie, trying to prove he actually understands women's desires.
- In the 2005 American drama film Bigger Than the Sky, a man auditions for a local community theater production of the play, and the plot plays out with it as the background theme.
- The history of the play is explored in Theresa Rebeck's 2018 Broadway play Bernhardt/Hamlet.
- The 2016 French play Edmond by Alexis Michalik is a fictionalized behind-the-scenes look at the composition and first performance of Cyrano de Bergerac. It was adapted as the 2018 film Edmond (distributed in English-speaking countries as Cyrano, My Love).
- In the 2010 visual novel Wonderful Everyday, the play is directly referenced and forms a core part of the narrative structure, with characters discussing the work and mirroring its central themes of fractured identity.

=== "Cyranoids" ===
Inspired by the balcony scene in which Cyrano provides Christian with words to speak to Roxane, Stanley Milgram developed an experimental technique that used covert speech shadowing to construct hybrid personae in social psychological experiments, wherein subjects would interact with a "Cyranoid" whose words emanated from a remote, unseen "source".

=== "The Cyrano Effect" ===
The Cyrano effect carries the conceit into online dating as daters pass off messages written by large language models as their own. A 2026 study found that users defended the practice as a way to voice a "truer" self that shyness or language barriers held back, while recipients who uncovered the ghostwriting felt deceived and struggled to reconcile the polished online suitor with the unassisted person, they met offline.

== Awards and nominations ==
=== 1946 Broadway revival ===
Year	Award	Category	Nominee	Result
1947	Tony Award	Best Actor in a Play	Jose Ferrer	Won

=== 1984 Broadway revival ===
Year	Award	Category	Nominee	Result
1985	Tony Award	Best Revival		Nominated
1985	Tony Award	Best Costume Design	Alexander Reid	Nominated
1985	Tony Award	Best Lighting Design	Terry Hands	Nominated
1985	Drama Desk Award	Outstanding Actor in a Play	Derek Jacobi	Nominated
1985	Drama Desk Award	Outstanding Sound Design	Nigel Hess	Won

=== 2007 Broadway revival ===
Year	Award	Category	Nominee	Result
2008	Tony Award	Tony Award for Best Costume Design of a Play	Gregory Gale	Nominated

=== 2012 Broadway revival ===
Year	Award	Category	Nominee	Result
2013	Tony Awards	Best Costume Design of a Play	Soutra Gilmour	Nominated

=== 2019 West End revival ===
Year	Award	Category	Nominee	Result
2020	Laurence Olivier Awards	Best Revival		Won
2020	Laurence Olivier Awards	Best Actor	James McAvoy	Nominated
2020	Laurence Olivier Awards	Best Actress in a Supporting Role	Michele Austin	Nominated
2020	Laurence Olivier Awards	Best Director	Jamie Lloyd	Nominated
