= Detroit Opera =

American opera company in Michigan

General information
- Name: Detroit Opera
- Year founded: 1971
- Founder: David DiChiera
- Principal venue: Detroit Opera House
- Website: detroitopera.org

Senior staff
- Chief executive: Patty Isacson Sabee

Artistic staff
- Artistic director: Yuval Sharon
- Music director: Roberto Kalb

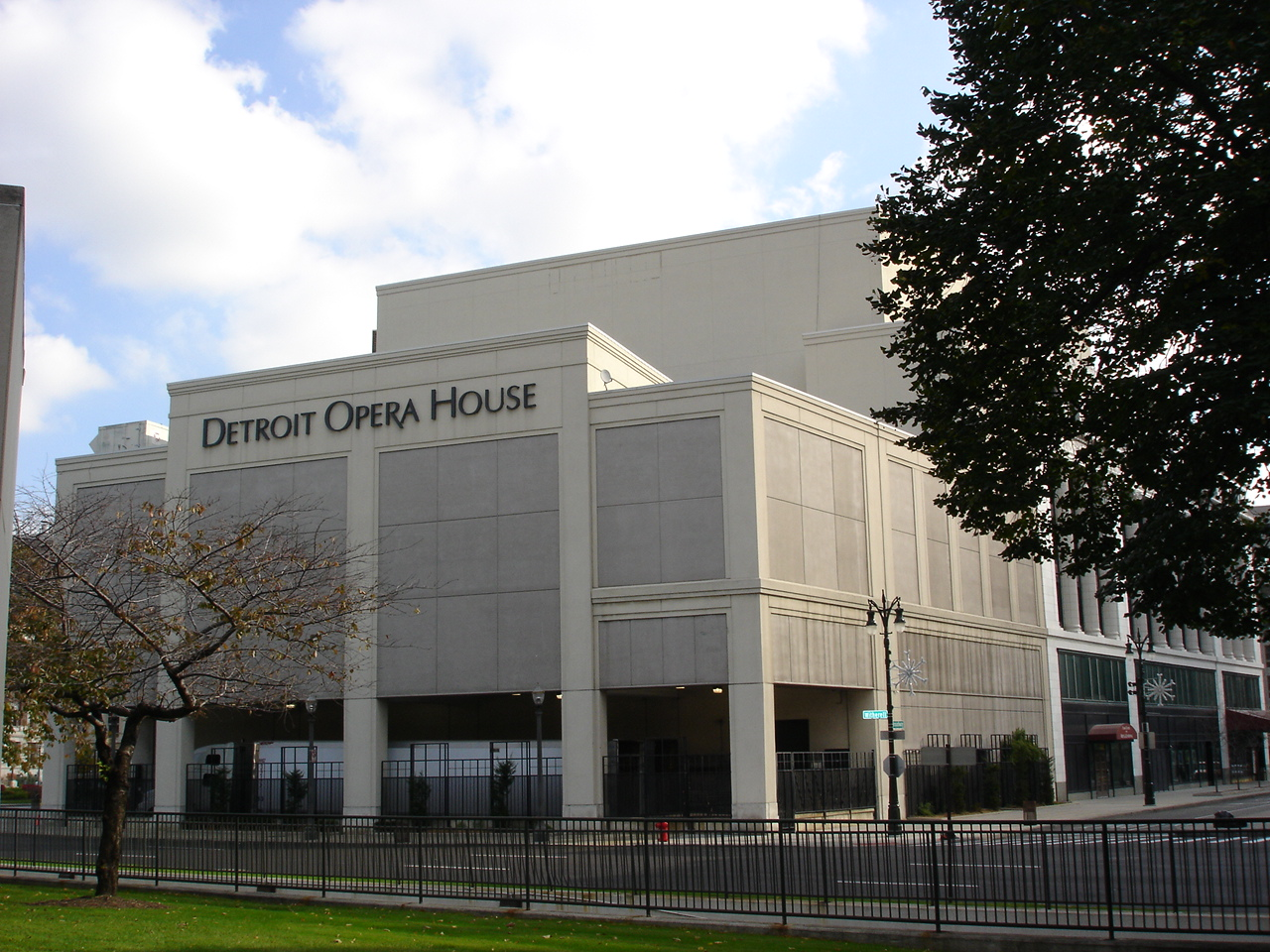
Detroit Opera House exterior

Detroit Opera is an American opera company based in Detroit, Michigan, USA. The company performs in the Detroit Opera House. Prior to February 28, 2022, the company was named Michigan Opera Theatre.

Annually, the company produces four operas in their original language with English supertitles and presents touring dance companies. It also presents musical theatre performances. The company has an orchestra, chorus, children's chorus, and extensive dance and arts education outreach programs. In 2005 MOT won a National Endowment for the Arts, Access to Artistic Excellence grant to support its staging of the world premiere of Margaret Garner.

As of January 2024, the president and CEO of Detroit Opera is Patty Isacson Sabee. Yuval Sharon became the Gary L. Wasserman Artistic Director in 2020.

== History ==
Detroit Opera began in 1961 as the educational outreach arm, Overture to Opera (OTO), of the Detroit Grand Opera Association, the organization responsible for the Metropolitan Opera's visits to Detroit.

=== The David DiChiera era (1963–2014) ===
In 1963, Michigan Opera Theatre's (MOT) Founder and General Director, David DiChiera took over the program, then in its third year. OTO first presented opera to the public as a collection of scenes and acts. It did not produce its first full-length production until 1970, with the staging of The Barber of Seville at the Detroit Institute of Arts. OTO transformed into a professional opera company after establishing a board of trustees in 1971, and in 1973, the company officially changed its name to Michigan Opera Theatre. 1977 marked the founding of MOT's Department of Community Programs by Karen VanderKloot DiChiera. The company became known for its casting which often featured a blend of established artists as well as young-up-and-coming American opera singers from a diversity of backgrounds, a tradition that continues to this day. The company was among the first to stage Gershwin's opera Porgy and Bess in 1975 as well as Scott Joplin's opera Treemonisha in 1983.

MOT also established an international reputation for the staging of rarely performed operas such as the North American premiere of Armenian composer, Armen Tigranian's, Anoush in 1981, Stanisław Moniuszko's The Haunted Castle in 1982, and Polish composer Karol Szymanowski's King Roger in 1991.

In 1989 the decision was made to purchase MOT's current home, the Detroit Opera House. Originally called the Capitol Theatre, the building, designed by C. Howard Crane, was in need of extensive restoration. The company eventually gained enough money to purchase the entire block encompassing the neighboring Roberts Fur building, which the company demolished in 1993 to make way for the 75,000-square-foot (7,000 m^{2}) stage house. The monumental task which became known as "The Detroit Opera House Project" took approximately 7 years to complete and was supported by local individuals, corporations, foundations and unions. Luciano Pavarotti was also a major contributor to the campaign, bringing the attention of the public to the project at large by promising to sing at the opening of the new opera house, donating large amounts of money to the cause, and by making various appearances around Detroit in performances designed to raise money for the project.

In April 1996, MOT celebrated the opening of its new home with a gala event which received international coverage. Among the guests at the gala were opera stars Joan Sutherland, Luciano Pavarotti, Irina Mishura, Helen Donath, Marcello Giordani, Gregg Baker, Alessandra Marc, and Elizabeth Parcells, conductor Steven Mercurio, and actor Roddy McDowall. The evening also featured a Fanfare for the Detroit Opera House by American composer William Bolcom which had been especially commissioned for the Gala. In 1996 MOT also added a permanent dance season to its repertoire with performances by the American Ballet Theatre and the Cleveland San Jose Ballet.

In 2005, the company staged the world premiere of Richard Danielpour’s Margaret Garner, based on Toni Morrison’s novel Beloved.

In 2014, founder and longtime general director DiChiera stepped down as president and CEO and became artistic director. Wayne S. Brown became president and CEO in 2014. DiChiera retired as artistic director in 2017.

=== The Wayne S. Brown era (2014–2024) ===
During Brown’s tenure, the opera company focused increasingly on producing operas that reached diverse audiences residing in and around the city of Detroit, such as Robert Xavier Rodriguez’s Frida and Mieczysław Weinberg's The Passenger in 2015, and Daniel Sonenberg's The Summer King in 2018. He also oversaw the rebranding to Detroit Opera in 2022.

Brown oversaw the recruitment of Yuval Sharon as artistic director in 2020. Sharon’s tenure began as operas were closing their doors nationwide in response to the Covid-19 pandemic. In October 2020, the company produced Twilight: Gods, an adaptation of Wagner’s Götterdämmerung that was performed in Detroit Opera House Parking Center. In 2021, the company produced Anthony Davis’ X: The Life and Times of Malcolm X, which marked its first revival since its 1986 premiere. Innovative opera productions have included La bohème in 2022, which presented Puccini’s four-act opera in reverse order, and The Valkyries, which staged Wagner’s Die Walküre with 3D computer graphics alongside live performance. Roberto Kalb became music director of the company in November 2022. In 2023, Brown was inducted into Opera America’s Opera Hall of Fame.

=== The Patty Isacson Sabee era (2024–present) ===
Since January 2024, Patty Isacson Sabee has served as Detroit Opera’s president and CEO. In December 2025, the company announced the scheduled departure of Sharon as its artistic director at the end of the 2025–2026 season, two years before the end of his contract. The company faced financial challenges, including reduced financial support from major foundations, in the wake of the COVID-19 pandemic and varying audience reactions to Sharon's programming ideas. Sharon stated publicly his understanding of the situation:

"They really tried to make it work. But it was just not the artistic vision that I agreed to. I would just feel like kind of a lame duck artistic director — at which point I'm not serving the organization."

In April 2026, the company announced the extension of Kalb's contract as music director through June 2030.

== Venues ==
Before Detroit Opera House opened in 1996, several Detroit performing arts venues were home to company productions. With the move to the Music Hall Center for the Performing Arts in 1971, Detroit Opera helped regenerate Detroit's Entertainment District. Still operating as Overture to Opera the company saved the Music Hall from demolition in 1971 and staged its first season there with productions of Joseph and the Amazing Technicolor Dreamcoat and Puccini's La rondine. Besides the Music Hall, Detroit Opera has staged productions at the Detroit Masonic Temple Theatre and the Fisher Theatre. In the 1984 spring season the company moved to the Masonic Temple to accommodate larger audiences and bigger productions, such as its first production, Anna Bolena, starring Joan Sutherland. The production also featured the American Midwest premiere of English surtitles. In 1985 the company moved to The Fisher Theatre for its autumn season and staged West Side Story which received an extended run and became one of Michigan Opera Theatres top grossing productions.

Since acquiring the Detroit Opera House, the company has presented opera and dance at several other venues such as the Macomb Center for the Performing Arts, Meadow Brook Amphitheatre, The Aretha Franklin Amphitheatre, and Gem Theatre.

== Arts education and outreach ==
Detroit Opera's Department of Community Programs (now called Education and Community Programs) was founded by Karen Vanderkloot DiChiera in 1977. In 2000, the department was awarded the Success in Education Award by Opera America for its summer programming for local children. The department also performs at local schools, churches and community groups. The Detroit Opera Youth Chorus trains young local vocalists for ensemble and mainstage productions. Additionally, Detroit Opera has premiered many children's operas. They include Vigilance (1975); Pete, the Pirate (1977); Look to the Land (1978); Under One Roof (1981); and Nanabush (1987) which were composed by Karen V. DiChiera, and Summer Snow which was composed by Fred Rogers of Mister Rogers' Neighborhood.

=== The Margo V. Cohen Center for Dance ===
The Margo V. Cohen Center for Dance was founded in 2001 by Dr. Carol Halsted as Director of Dance. The Center, which is also a component of Detroit Opera's community programming, is located within the Ford Center for Learning. It hosts the company's Dance Film series and hosted the American Ballet Theatre summer intensive program. The center also hosts year-round master classes for beginning to advanced dance students and dance auditions are also held at the center.

=== Resident Artists ===
Since 1979, Detroit Opera has supported early-career opera professionals through a year-long apprenticeship program. Since 2022, the program has been known as the Detroit Opera Resident Artist Program and is supported by a tribute fund for former president and CEO Wayne S. Brown.

== Detroit Opera Archive and Resource Library ==
The Detroit Opera Archive and Resource Library is the official library and archive for Detroit Opera. It specializes in research materials specific to dance, opera and the company's extensive history. The library was made created in 2007 with a gift from Robert and Maggie Allesee. The library and archive center carries books, scores, CDs, videos and hundreds of unique items such as photos and performance reviews from company productions. From 2009-2023, the Resource Library's catalogue publicly available online through a unique partnership with Wayne State University's School of Library and Information Science.

== Notable productions and performances ==
Notable productions have included:

=== Operas, concerts, and musicals ===
- 1979: MOT's production of The Most Happy Fella which traveled to Broadway.
- 1984: Donizetti's Anna Bolena featuring Australian soprano Dame Joan Sutherland. This was the first appearance in the Midwest of surtitle translations.
- 1988: Puccini's La bohème, featuring Russian tenor Vyacheslav Polozov's.
- 1999: Massenet's Werther, featuring Italian tenor Andrea Bocelli's North American opera debut, with American mezzo Denyce Graves. The production’s final performance was webcast by Global Music Network.
- 2002: First MOT production of Too Hot to Handel, the beginning of a tradition.
- 2005: Grammy Award winner Richard Danielpour's Margaret Garner world premiere, from a libretto by Nobel Prize winning author Toni Morrison
- 2007: MOT's general director Dr. David DiChiera's Cyrano in its world premiere. The libretto was by Bernard Uzan.
- 2014: Strauss’ Elektra, featuring American soprano Christine Goerke.
- 2015: Robert Xavier Rodriguez’s Frida, featuring Catalina Cuervo.
- 2015: Weinberg’s The Passenger.
- 2016: Aaron Copland’s The Tender Land, an anchor work for MOT’s resident artists.
- 2016: Kevin Puts’ Silent Night.
- 2017: Mark Adamo’s Little Women.
- 2018: Ricky Ian Gordon’s 27, cast exclusively with MOT’s resident artists.
- 2018: Daniel Sonenberg’s The Summer King, as a part of the company's Take Me Out to the Opera initiative exploring the role of the arts and sports in racial equity.
- 2020: Twilight: Gods, a drive-thru experience of Wagner’s Götterdämmerung (Twilight of the Gods) with English translation by Yuval Sharon and poetic narration by Marsha Music.
- 2022: Puccini’s La bohème, with music presented in reverse order for the first time.
- 2022: The Valkyries, a new production of Wagner’s Die Walküre combining 3D computer graphics alongside live performance.
- 2022: Anthony Davis' X: The Life and Times of Malcolm X.
- 2024: John Cage’s Europeras 3 & 4.
- 2024: Leoš Janáček’s Cunning Little Vixen, combining hand-drawn animation and video projections with live performance.

=== Dance Performances ===
- 1989–90 Season: Swan Lake performed by Cleveland Ballet; this was the first time dance appeared in the season.
- 1993: MOT’s first self-produced ballet, The Sleeping Beauty, choreographed by Iacob Lascu.
- 1996-97: American Ballet Theatre and Cleveland San Jose Ballet, MOT's first dance season.
- 1998: Alvin Ailey's Harlem Nutcracker, MOT debut.
- 1999: Paul Taylor Dance Company MOT debut.
- 2001: Joffrey Ballet's MOT debut.
- 2000: Ballet Internationale's The Nutcracker, the beginning of a tradition.
- 2002–2003: Bolshoi Ballet's Swan Lake.
- 2003: Dance Theatre of Harlem.
- 2003: Les Ballets Africains.
- 2004: The Kirov Ballet's (now the Mariinsky Ballet) La Bayadere.
- 2004: North Carolina Dance Theatre's (now Charlotte Ballet) A Streetcar Named Desire.
- 2005–2006: Savion Glover.
- 2007: The Grand Rapids Ballet's Where The Wild Things Are.

== Notable artists ==
Among the notable artists who have sung at MOT early in their careers are: Detroit-born Maria Ewing who sang in the 1970 The Barber of Seville production; Leona Mitchell, who sang Bess in the company's 1975 production of Porgy and Bess; Kathleen Battle, whose 1975 performance as Rosina in The Barber of Seville marked her operatic debut; Catherine Malfitano, who created the role of Catherine Sloper in MOT's world premiere staging of Washington Square in 1976. Other notable artists include The Metropolitan Opera's Jerome Hines, a bass, who in 1974 sang the title role of Boris Godunov; Nicole Cabell who sang Musetta in La bohème in 2005, a few months after winning the BBC Cardiff Singer of the World competition; Australian soprano Dame Joan Sutherland who sang the title role in Donizetti's Anna Bolena; Martina Arroyo and Ghena Dimitrova who sang in MOT's 1986 production of Turandot; Luciano Pavarotti who sang at Joe Louis Arena in 1989; Irina Mishura who played Carmen during the 1996-97 season; The Three Tenors in 1999 at the historic Tiger Stadium in Detroit, Andrea Bocelli who made his staged operatic debut in Werther and Denyce Graves who made her MOT debut in Werther; Vyacheslav Polozov, the Russian tenor who sang in Puccini's La bohème; and Ewa Podleś, the Polish contralto who sang in Verdi's A Masked Ball. More recently, the acclaimed dramatic soprano Christine Goerke has performed in Fidelio (2013), Elektra (2014), Twilight: Gods (2020), Cavalleria Rusticana (2021), The Valkyries (2022), and Aida In Concert (2022) alongside soprano Angel Blue.Goerke served as Detroit Opera’s associate artistic director from 2021-2024.

== Premieres ==
=== World ===
Detroit Opera has staged the world premieres of the following operas:

- 1976: Washington Square, composed by Thomas Pasatieri to a libretto by Kenward Elmslie after Henry James's novel, Washington Square.
- 1978: Singers / "What is there to sing about?" composed by Charles Strouse, commissioned by MOT.
- 2005: Margaret Garner, composed by Richard Danielpour to a libretto by Toni Morrison based on her novel Beloved.
- 2007: Cyrano composed by David DiChiera to a libretto by Bernard Uzan after Edmond Rostand's play Cyrano de Bergerac.

=== North American ===
Detroit Opera staged these North American premieres:

- 1981: Anoush composed by Armen Tigranian Based on a Poem by Hovhannes Toumanian.
- 1982: The Haunted Castle (The Haunted Manor), composed by Stanisław Moniuszko and translated from Polish by Sally Williams-Haik.
