= Ilich Lozano =

Mexican politician (born 1982)

- Born: 12 June 1982 (age 43); Guerrero, Mexico
- Other name: Ilich Lozano
- Occupation: Politician
- Political party: MORENA
- Spouse: Liliana Alheli Hernández Pinzón
- Relatives: Rosario Herrera (Mother)

Ilich Augusto Lozano Herrera (born 12 June 1982) is a Mexican politician from the Movimiento de Regeneracion Nacional. From 2009 to 2012 he served as Deputy of the LXI Legislature of the Mexican Congress representing Guerrero.
