= Vyacheslav Polozov =

Soviet-born opera singer and professor

Vyacheslav Michailovich Polozov (Russian: Вячеслав Михайлович Полозов; January 1, 1950) is a Soviet operatic tenor. He sang at many opera houses around the world, appearing in a variety of leading roles from lyric to dramatic repertoires in French, Italian, German and Russian. Laureate International Competitions. Meritorious Artist of the Byelorussian SSR.

== Biography ==
Vyacheslav Michailovich Polozov (Russian: Вячеслав Михайлович Полозов) was born in the industrial city of Mariupol, Ukrainian SSR, where his parents, mother Ludmila Danilovna Roschina (1918-2003) and father Michael Semyonovich Polozov (1918-?), worked on the local railroad. From 1967 to 1970, he studied at Donetsk Music College. While studying, he sang some small roles at the Donetsk State Academic Opera Theatre. From 1970 to 1972, Polozov served his military duty in Soviet Red Army Choir, Kiev, Ukraine. From 1973-1978, he studied voice at the Tchaikovsky National Academy of Music (or Kiev Conservatory), during which time he made his successful operatic debut in 1977 in the role of Alfredo in La Traviata at the National Opera of Ukraine.

== Opera career ==
In 1978, he became the leading tenor of the Saratov Academic Opera and Ballet Theatre when he performed: Vladimir Igorevich in Borodin's Prince Igor, The Prince in Dargomyzhsky's Rusalka, Lensky in Tchaikovsky's Eugene Onegin, Lohengrin in Wagner's Lohengrin and in 1980 he became a member of the National Academic Opera and Ballet Theatre of the Republic of Belarus when he performed: Faust in Gounod's Faust, Alfredo in Verdi's La Traviata, the Duke of Mantua in Verdi's Rigoletto, Prince Kuragin in Prokofiev's War and Peace, Pinkerton In Puccini's Madama Butterfly, Vodemon in Tchaikovsky's Iolanta, Tsar Berendey in Rimsky-Korsakov's The Snow Maiden. As a member of the Opera Theatre (Minsk), in 1982, Polozov made his successful debut with the Bolshoi Theatre when he performed Alfredo opposite Margarita Voites and Turiddu in Mascagni's Cavalleria rusticana opposite Makvala Kasrashvili and Elena Obraztsova.

In 1983, he made his debut in the role of Faust at the Lithuanian National Opera opposite Grazina Apanaviciute and Irena Milkeviciute. In 1984, he made debut for the role of the Duke of Mantua at the Bulgarian National Opera and Lensky at the Novosibirsk Opera and Ballet Theatre. In 1984, he performed the role of Alfredo at the Estonian National Opera and Latvian National Opera. In January 1986, another great success followed - Polozov's debut at the Teatro alla Scala in Milano where he sang the role of Pinkerton, which very soon became, along with the role of Rodolfo in La Boheme the most important roles in his repertoire. In May 1986 after winning the prestigious Madama Butterfly singing competition (Tokyo, Japan), Polozov announced his intention to live in the United States.

Since his arrival in the USA, Polozov has appeared in numerous highly praised performances throughout the country - from Chicago (city of his American operatic debut for the role of Rodolfo La Boheme with Michael Tilson Thomas) to Boston, New York (his Metropolitan Opera debut in January 1987 in the role of Pinkerton opposite Renata Scotto, to California's Palm Springs and Texas - at the San Antonio Festival ("Tosca") with Julius Rudel, which received highest public and press acclaim. He also appeared in the Metropolitan Opera summer season in parks for the role of Rodolfo and a concert and recording in Washington D.C. (Kennedy Center) of Boris Godunov the role of Dimitry, opposite Ruggero Raimondi as Boris, Galina Vishnevskaya as Marina, Nicolai Gedda as the Simplenton and Paul Plishka as Pimen under the baton of Mstislav Rostropovich. The new 1987/88 season started for Polozov with a great success when he appeared in the role of Calaf in Puccini's Turandot in New York City Opera, and the very same week repeated this role in Munich's Bayerische Staatsoper with Giuseppe Patane.

During the 1988/89 season, he performed in San Francisco Opera in the role of Enzo in La Gioconda opposite Eva Marton and in the role of Cavaradossi in Puccini's Tosca at the Canadian Opera Company. Soon he was engaged to perform in Paris, Hamburg, Barcelona, Rome, Lyon, Houston, Miami, Los Angeles, Santiago, Tokyo, and other world opera houses. He sang almost every major tenor role of the Russian, Italian, German and French repertory.

== Personal life ==
He is married to Elena Leontieva and they have two children.

== Awards ==
- 1980 Glinka singing competition, Minsk, Belorussia - Gold Medal
- 1984 8th International Young Opera Singers Competition, Sofia, Bulgaria - Silver
- 1986 Meritorious Artist of the Byelorussian SSR
- 1986 Madama Butterfly singing competition - Tokyo, Japan - Grand Prix

== Repertoire ==
- Alexander Borodin "Prince Igor" - Vladimir Igorevich
- Alexander Dargomyzhsky "Rusalka" - The Prince
- Charles Gounod "Faust" - Doctor Faust
- Modest Mussorgsky "Boris Godunov" - The Pretender Grigoriy
- "Khovanshchina" - Prince Andrey Khovansky and Prince Golitzin
- Sergei Prokofiev "War and Peace" - Pierre Bezukhov and Prince Kuragin
- Sergei Rachmaninoff "Aleko" - Young Gypsy
- Nikolai Rimsky-Korsakov "The Snow Maiden" - Tsar Berendey
- "The Tsar's Bride" - Boyar Ivan Sergeyevich Lykov
- Pyotr Ilyich Tchaikovsky "Eugene Onegin" - Lensky
- "The Queen of Spades" - Gherman (Hermann)
- "Iolanta" - Count Vaudémont
- Umberto Giordano "Andrea Chénier" - Andrea Chénier
- Pietro Mascagni "Cavalleria rusticana" - Turiddu
- Amilcare Ponchielli "La Gioconda" - Enzo Grimaldo
- Giacomo Puccini "Tosca" - Mario Cavaradossi
- "Madama Butterfly" - B. F. Pinkerton
- "Turandot" - Prince Calàf
- "La Bohème - Rodolfo
- Giuseppe Verdi "Aida" - Radames
- "Un ballo in maschera" - Riccardo (Gustavo)
- "La forza del destino" - Don Alvaro
- "La Traviata" - Alfredo Germont
- "Rigoletto" - Duke of Mantua
- "Il trovatore" - Manrico
- "Macbeth" - Macduff
- "Don Carlos" - Don Carlos
- Richard Wagner "Lohengrin" - Lohengrin

== Recordings ==
- 1986 Aleko by Sergei Rachmaninoff, Moscow Philharmonic Orchestra, under Dmitri Kitayenko, MELODIA
- 1987 "Boris Godunov" by Modest Mussorgsky, National Symphony Orchestra, under Mstislav Rostropovich, ERATO Records
- 1988 Tosca by Giacomo Puccini, Canadian Opera Company, under Richard Bradshaw, PICKWICK Video
- 1994 KALINKA - Famous Russian Songs, Ossipov State Russian Folk Orchestra, conductor Nikolai Kalinin, POLEON Classics
- 1996 INDEPENDENCE - The Great Celebration of the Ukrainian Independence Choir and Orchestra of Military Forces of the Ukrainian Army, Conductor Colonel Vladimir Zibrov, POLEON Classics.
- During his career, Polozov made many Radio and TV broadcasts.
