= Cyrano (DiChiera) =

2007 opera by David DiChiera

- Opera by David DiChiera
- Librettist: Bernard Uzan
- Language: French
- Based on: Play Cyrano de Bergerac by Edmond Rostand
- Premiere: October 13, 2007; Michigan Opera Theatre

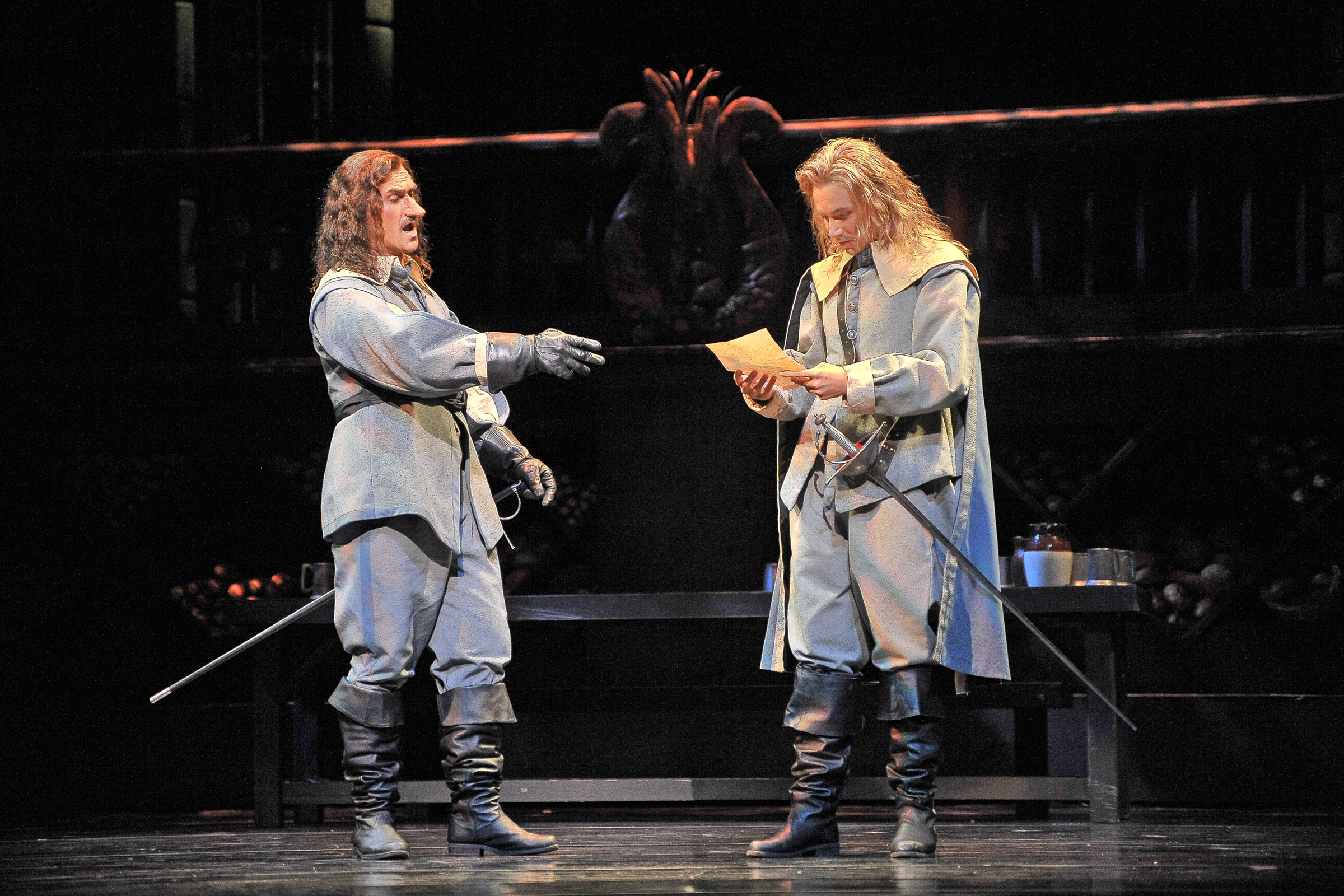
Marian Pop and Sebastien Guäze in Cyrano, part of FGO's Opera Free for All project

Cyrano is an opera in three acts by David DiChiera, with orchestration by Mark Flint, to a libretto in French by Bernard Uzan, based on the 1897 play Cyrano de Bergerac by Edmond Rostand. It premiered on October 13, 2007, at the Michigan Opera Theatre, and was then presented on February 8 to 17, 2008, at the Opera Company of Philadelphia. Florida Grand Opera presented it in April 2011. It was revived November 4, 2017, by Opera Carolina.

== Roles ==
Roles, voice types, premiere cast
Role	Voice type	Premiere cast, 13 October 2007 Conductor: Mark Flint
Cyrano	baritone	Marian Pop
Roxane	soprano	Leah Partridge
Christian	tenor	José Luis Sola
DeGuiche	bass	Peter Volpe
Duenna	mezzo-soprano	Gloria Parker
Lebret	baritone	Gaetan Laperriere
Ragueneau	tenor	Eric Johnston
Carbon; Inconnu	bass-baritone	Daniel Okulitch
Capucin; Marquis de Cuigy	tenor	Torrance Blaisdell
Orchestra		Michigan Opera Theatre Orchestra
Chorus; Chorus master		Michigan Opera Theatre Chorus; Suzanne Mallare Acton
Director		Bernard Uzan
Costumes		John Pascoe
Lighting design		Donald Thomas

== Synopsis ==
=== Act 1 ===
Scene 1

The audience at the Hotel Bourgogne anticipate a performance by the famous actor Montfleury. Christian de Neuvilette, a handsome new recruit in the Gascon Guards, points out to his drunken friend, Lignière, a woman in one of the boxes with whom he is in love. Lignière tells Christian that she is Madeleine de Robin, known as Roxane. She is beautiful, rich, and intellectual. Christian laments that he is too stupid and coarse to win the heart of such a refined woman. The baker-poet Rageneau and the soldier Le Bret enter looking for one of the Gascon Guards, Cyrano de Bergerac, who has banned Montfleury from performing for a month. They describe Cyrano as being eloquent and brave, but as being much ridiculed because of his abnormally large nose, a subject on which he is extremely sensitive. Lignière goes out drinking, and Christian is told by a mysterious man of an attempt at Lignière's life. That night when Lignière goes to the Porte de Nelle on his way home, he will be met by one hundred men sent by a nobleman who is upset that Lignière wrote a poem making fun of him. Christian goes to save Lignière.

The performance commences, but in the middle of it Cyrano chases Montfleury offstage and pays off the theater manager. A nobleman tries to insult Cyrano by saying simply that his nose is "very large". Cyrano counters by coming up with many other more interesting insults the nobleman could have used. Swords are drawn and Cyrano wounds the nobleman. Le Bret tells Cyrano that he is making too many enemies, and Cyrano in turn confesses his love for Roxane. He says that he loves Roxane but she will never be able to love him in return because of his large nose. Roxane's nurse arrives to tell Cyrano that Roxane requests a meeting with him at Rageneau's bakery the next day, and Cyrano accepts. Cyrano then learns of the plot against Lignière, and determines to take on the mob himself.

Scene 2 Cyrano arrives at the bakery, eagerly anticipating his meeting with Roxane. Rageneau's wife, Lise, enters with some of Rageneau's manuscripts that she has turned into paper bags for pastries, to Rageneau's dismay. Roxane's nurse arrives with Roxane and Cyrano gets her out of the room by telling her to go out into the streets and eat some pastries, and then read the poetry written on the bags. Alone with Cyrano, Roxane confesses her love for a man. Cyrano thinks it is him who she loves, but it is actually Christian. Roxane makes Cyrano promise to protect Christian in battle.

The cadets arrive, praising Cyrano. Christian and Le Bret are among them. Cyrano proceeds to tell the story of how he fought the hundred men at the Porte de Nelle, and Christian interjects several references to Cyrano's nose. Cyrano orders the room cleared and is alone with Christian. Cyrano tells Christian that he is Roxane's cousin, and Christian confesses his love. The two become fast friends. They eventually decide that Cyrano will write letters to Roxane under Christian's name.

=== Act 2 ===
Roxane is waiting for a meeting with Christian. She and Cyrano converse about Christian's "refinement". Cyrano exits before Le Comte de Guiche enters. He is in love with Roxane and asks her to become his lover before he goes to war against the Spanish. She declines, but not before convincing him to allow Cyrano and Christian's company to stay in Paris.

Christian later arrives, and tells Cyrano that he no longer needs his services, and that he can win Roxane on his own. But when he tries, he fails miserably, angering Roxane with his "loss of charm". Cyrano tells Christian that he will feed him words to say to Roxane. Christian then woos Roxane, who is on her balcony. Eventually Cyrano takes over, speaking while Christian mouths words. Christian climbs up the balcony and kisses Roxane. A Capucin monk, delivering to Roxane a message that De Guiche still wants to meet with her, agrees to marry Christian and Roxane. The couple celebrate their love while Cyrano laments that he has lost Roxane. De Guiche arrives and, seeing that Roxane and Christian are married, orders Cyrano, Christian, and their company to report to go to war against the Spanish. Roxane makes Cyrano promise that Christian write to her every single day.

=== Act 3 ===
Scene 1

At the battlefield in Arras, the soldiers are asleep. Christian, Carbon and Le Bret are among them, and Le Bret awakens to find Cyrano running to the camp from enemy lines. He has gone out every day to deliver "Christian's" letters to Roxane. De Guiche arrives and chastises them. After Cyrano insults De Guiche, he waves a white handkerchief as a signal to a spy to tell the Spanish to attack, and ensuring certain death for Cyrano and the guards. Roxane later arrives with Rageneau, bring food. She has crossed enemy territory to see Christian. Cyrano tells Christian about the letters, and gives him a letter to sign so he can give it to Roxane if he dies. Christian notices a mark on the letter, and Cyrano replies that it is one of his tears, as dying is not so terrible as never seeing Roxane again. Roxane tells Christian that she would love him even if he were ugly, and he realizes that she loves Cyrano, not him. Christian convinces Cyrano to tell Roxane about the letters, then rushes into battle. Just as Cyrano is about to do so, Le Bret and Carbon enter carrying the mortally wounded Christian. Cyrano tells Christian that he told Roxane and that she loves him, and Christian dies.

Scene 2

Fifteen years later, Roxane lives at a convent, mourning the loss of Christian. Cyrano comes to her every day, delivering his Gazette, or news from the outside world. Cyrano comes to visit her, and tell her news, and Roxane notices blood on his head. Cyrano confesses that he has been brutally beaten by one of his enemies, and is dying. Before he dies, Cyrano requests he read Christian's farewell letter to her one last time. Roxane notices that Cyrano is not reading the letter, but he is reciting it. She realizes then that it was Cyrano she loved all along. Cyrano dies in Roxane's arms.

== Differences from the play ==
- Christian is told of the plot against Lignière by a mysterious cloaked man. In the play, he is told by a boy who tries to steal money from his purse.
- The play is in five acts. The opera combines the first and second, and the third and fourth acts to create three acts.
- The scene in which Cyrano tries to distract De Guiche from arriving at Roxane's house by telling him that he has fallen from the Moon is cut.
