= Ilyich Rivas =

Venezuelan-American conductor (born 1993)

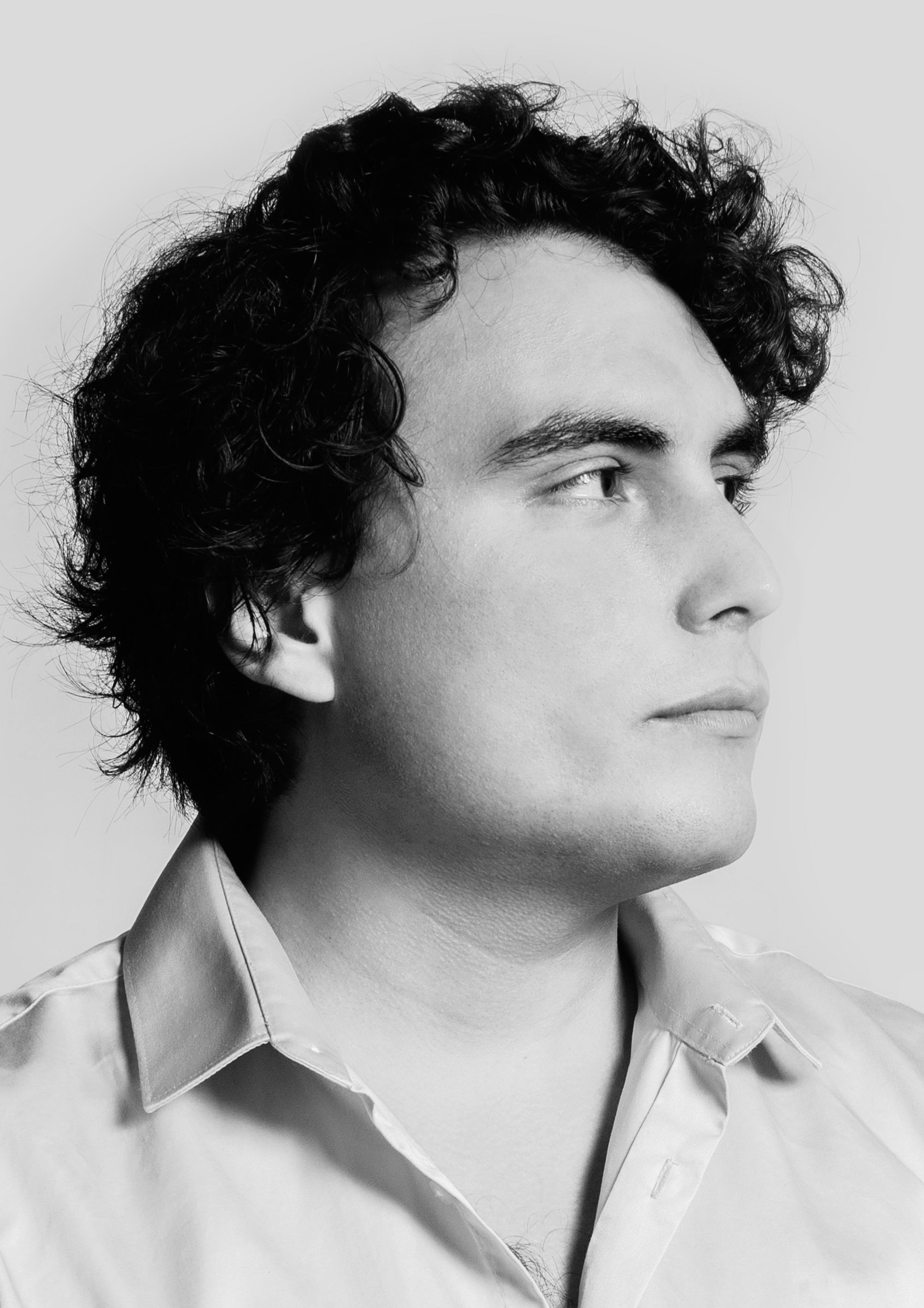
- Ilyich Rivas, 2021

Background information
- Born: June 9, 1993 (age 32); San Cristóbal, Venezuela
- Genres: Classical
- Occupation: Conductor

Ilyich Rivas (born June 9, 1993) is a Venezuelan-American conductor. He made his professional debut at the age of 16 in front of the Atlanta Symphony Orchestra, and has subsequently made successful debuts with a number of important orchestras in Europe, Australia and America.

== Early life and studies ==
He comes from a musical family. He is a fourth generation of conductors; their parents moved to the United States when he was one year old (1994), his mother Marjorie Carrero as a Spanish and Hispano-American Literature professor and his father Alejandro Rivas as a conductor.

From a very early age showed a great interest in conducting. He took regular lessons from his father from the age of six and joined him to all his orchestral rehearsals and performances. He studied piano and won several piano awards throughout his teens. In 2009 he attracted the attention of Marin Alsop and Gustav Meier at the International Cabrillo Conductors Festival.

They invited him to audition in front of the Baltimore Symphony Orchestra for the two-year position of Baltimore Symphony Orchestra Peabody Institute Conducting fellow. This position enabled him to study conducting at the Peabody Conservatory under the guidance of Gustav Meier and to work closely with Marin Alsop and the Baltimore Symphony.

From 2009 had a four-year mentoring program over the summers under Vladimir Jurowski at Glyndebourne Festival Opera.

His father Alejandro Rivas continues to be his principal guide and mentor.

== Career ==
Ilyich has led many performances including with the London Philharmonic Orchestra, Prague Radio Symphony, Orquesta Sinfónica de Castilla y León and the Orquesta Sinfónica de Galicia. In addition, he has conducted the Verbier Festival Orchestra, the orchestras of London's Royal College of Music and the Australian National Academy of Music in Melbourne, the Youth Orchestra of the Americas (YOA), the Youth Orchestra of Bahia, Brazil, the Chetham's Symphony Orchestra in Manchester, UK, and the YouTube Symphony Orchestra in Sydney at the invitation of Michael Tilson Thomas.

Ilyich was assistant conductor with the London Philharmonic Orchestra during the 2012–2013 season and assistant conductor with the Baltimore Symphony Orchestra during the 2009–2011 seasons. Recent highlights include his debuts with the Orchestre National de Lyon, the Deutsche Radio Philharmonie Saarbrücken, the Edmonton Symphony Orchestra, and the Cameristi della Scala, a chamber orchestra comprising musicians from the orchestra of Milan's Teatro alla Scala. As an Opera conductor, Ilyich Rivas was invited by Glyndebourne Touring Opera to conduct Le nozze di Figaro in 2012, and Humperdinck's Hänsel und Gretel the following season.

In 2014, he made his debut with Opera North conducting several performances of La Bohème.

In May 2022, he made his debut at the Philharmonie de Paris as guest conductor to conclude the 2021/2022 season of the Orchestre National d'Île-de-France and its tour of France's Île-de-France region.

In 2023, he conducted the George Enescu Philharmonic Orchestra in Bucharest, Romania. In 2024, he conducted the Armenian Philharmonic Orchestra, and in 2025, he has been invited by the Phoenix Symphony to give three concerts.

He has performed with such artists of international renown as Lang Lang, Stephen Hough, Simon Trpceski, Steven Isserlis, Elisabeth Leonskaja, and Alissa Weilerstein among others. As recently as 2017 he has conducted the National Youth Orchestra of Ireland as part of their Summer tour.

== Awards ==
Has been awarded the Bruno Walter Conducting Prize and the Prix Julius Baer in Switzerland, given by the Verbier Festival.
