= David DiChiera =

American classical composer

- Born: April 8, 1935; McKeesport, Pennsylvania, U.S.
- Died: September 18, 2018 (aged 83); Detroit, Michigan, U.S.
- Occupations: Opera administrator, composer

David DiChiera (/ˌdiːkaɪˈɛərə/ DEE-ky-AIR-ə; April 8, 1935 – September 18, 2018) was an American composer and founding general director of Michigan Opera Theatre.

== Career ==
Born in McKeesport, Pennsylvania as son of Italian immigrants, DiChiera was raised in Los Angeles, California, and graduated with highest honors from University of California, Los Angeles (UCLA), in 1956. When he received a Master's degree in composition at UCLA, he was selected to be a Fulbright scholar for studies in Italy where he conducted extensive research on unpublished manuscripts of eighteenth century opera. This led to a series of articles for the world's leading music encyclopedias including Ricordi's Enciclopedia della musica, Grove Dictionary of Music and Musicians and Bärenreiter's Die Musik in Geschichte und Gegenwart.

Returning to UCLA, DiChiera worked there as an instructor and received his PhD in Musicology. In 1962, DiChiera joined the faculty of music of the newly established Oakland University in Rochester, Michigan. From 1963 to 1965, he also held the post of assistant dean for Continuing Education in the Arts at Oakland University and was thereafter elected Chairman of the Department of Music.

In 1971 DiChiera became the founding General Director of Michigan Opera Theatre. At the same time, he became the founding Artistic Director of the Music Hall Center for the Performing Arts. From 1979 to 1983 DiChiera served as president of Opera America. In this role, he developed the Lila Wallace Reader's Digest Fund/Opera for a New America Program which encouraged and supported companies to reach previously under-addressed segments of the population, and served to build bridges into America's increasingly diverse population.

From 1981 to 1993, DiChiera was appointed Artistic Director of the Dayton Opera Association. In 1986 he was appointed founding General Director of the newly formed Opera Pacific in Orange County; he filled that post until 1996, when he resigned to devote more time to the opening of the Detroit Opera House.

In April 1996, opera singer Joan Sutherland cut the ribbon to celebrate the grand opening of the restored Detroit Opera House under DiChiera's stewardship.

During his career, DiChiera has served as a trustee for the National Institute of Music Theatre and as a board member of the American Arts Alliance. He has been a panel member for the National Endowment for the Arts (NEA) and chairman for the Opera/Musical Theater Panel. He has also chaired several national music conferences. DiChiera chaired the second annual conference of the International Association of Lyric Theatre, convened in Verona, Italy, and was twice elected vice president of that organization.

He has two daughters with Karen VanderKloot DiChiera, daughter of Robert VanderKloot, a Detroit amateur musician and himself a founding member of the Michigan Opera Theatre. Karen VanderKloot DiChiera, a composer, educator and stage director, is also a founder and director of Michigan Opera Theatre's Department of Community Programs.

In February 2016, DiChiera announced his retirement, effective in July 2017.

In April 2017, DiChiera was diagnosed with pancreatic cancer. He died at his home in Detroit on September 18, 2018.

== Works ==
His Four Sonnets (1965), to verses by Edna St. Vincent Millay composed for soprano and piano, premiered in 1978 at the Kennedy Center in Washington to critical acclaim. A children's opera, Rumpelstiltskin (1973), composed with Karen VanderKloot DiChiera, and with Joan V. Hill as librettist. It has been performed nationally. In 2007 his opera Cyrano to a libretto by Bernard Uzan received its world premiere at the Detroit Opera House; this work was successfully presented by Opera Company of Philadelphia in 2008 and premiered at Florida Grand Opera in 2011.

== Awards ==
DiChiera was awarded the Atwater Kent (UCLA) and Gershwin Awards. The Detroit News elected DiChiera "Michiganian of the Year" in 1979. In 2000 he received the Bridge Builder's Award by the Partners for Livable Communities, a Washington–based civic leadership organization. In 2005, the National Association of Negro Musicians honored DiChiera for his continued support of African American artists and in 2016 the President of the Republic of Italy conferred upon him the Commander in the Order of Merit of the Italian Republic. DiChiera delivered the commencement speech at the University of Michigan's graduation ceremony in 1998 and was awarded an honorary Doctor of Music degree. He received honorary doctorates from Wayne State University, Oakland University and Marygrove College. In 2010, DiChiera received the NEA Opera Honors.
