= Mark Campbell (librettist) =

American librettist

Mark Campbell is a New York-based librettist and lyricist whose operas have received both a Pulitzer Prize in Music and a GRAMMY Award. Mark began writing for the stage as a musical theatre lyricist, but turned to libretto-writing after he premiered Volpone, his first full-length opera in 2004 at Wolf Trap Opera Company.

Mark has written 40 opera librettos, lyrics for 7 musicals and text for 6 song cycles and 4 oratorios. His best-known works are Silent Night, The Shining, The (R)evolution of Steve Jobs, As One, Later the Same Evening, Stonewall, Elizabeth Cree and the musical Songs from an Unmade Bed. His operas have been produced by most of the prominent opera companies in the U.S., including Atlanta Opera, Arizona Opera, Austin Opera, Boston Lyric Opera, Central City Opera, Chicago Opera Theatre, Cincinnati Opera, Des Moines Metro Opera, Ft. Worth Opera, Houston Grand Opera, Hawaii Opera Theatre, Lyric Opera of Kansas City, Michigan Opera Theatre, Minnesota Opera, New Orleans Opera, New York City Opera, Opera Colorado, Opera Memphis, Opera Parallèle, Opera Philadelphia, Pensacola Opera, Pittsburgh Opera, Portland Opera, San Diego Opera, San Francisco Opera, Santa Fe Opera, Seattle Opera, Urban Arias, Utah Opera, Virginia Opera, Washington National Opera and West Edge Opera.

As an educator, Mark has established libretto-writing programs at the American Opera Project, Washington National Opera's American Opera Initiative, American Lyric Theatre and the University of Colorado's New Opera Workshop. In 2022, he created the Campbell Opera Librettist Prize, the first and only award for opera librettists in the history of the art form (administered by OPERA America). In 2022, he co-created, with his As One collaborators, the True Voice Award to help with the training of transgender and non-binary singers (administered by Washington National Opera's Cafritz Young Artist's Program).

== Operas (librettos) ==
Title	Description	Composer	Co-Librettist	Producing company
Volpone	A Comic Opera in Two Acts Unfaithfully fashioned from the play by Ben Jonson	John Musto		Wolf Trap Opera
Later the Same Evening	An Opera Inspired by Five Paintings of Edward Hopper	John Musto		The University of Maryland School of Music
Bastianello	A Comic Opera Inspired by an Italian Folk Tale	John Musto		New York Festival of Song/Carnegie Hall
Lucrezia	A Comic Opera based on Machiavelli's La Mandragola	William Bolcom		New York Festival of Song/Carnegie Hall
A Letter to East 11th Street	An Opera in Two Parts	Martin Hennessy		The American Opera Project/CUNY Crane School of Music
The Tell-Tale Heart	An Operatic Monologue based on the Short Story by Edgar Allan Poe	Lance Horne		Zipper Theatre
The Girl I Left Behind	An Operatic Monologue based on the Short Story by Dame Muriel Spark	Lance Horne		Zipper Theatre
A Hunger Artist	An Operatic Monologue based on Kafka's The Hunger Artist	Lance Horne		Zipper Theatre
Rappahannock County	A Theatrical Song Cycle about the American Civil War	Ricky Ian Gordon		Virginia Opera/Richmond University/ University of Texas Performing Arts Center
The Inspector	A Comic Opera in Two Acts Based on Gogol's The Government Inspector	John Musto		Wolf Trap Opera/Boston Lyrics Opera
Silent Night	An Opera in Two Acts Adapted from the Film Joyeux Noël (screenplay by Christian Carion)	Kevin Puts		Minnesota Opera
The Manchurian Candidate	An Opera in Two Acts Adapted from the novel by Richard Condon	Kevin Puts		Minnesota Opera
A Song for Susan Smith	An Opera in One Act	Zach Redler		University of Colorado New Opera Workshop
A Dog's Heart	A Short Comic Opera based on Bulgakov's "Heart of a Dog"	Lembit Beecher		Opera Philadelphia
The Shining	An Opera in Two Acts after the novel by Stephen King	Paul Moravec		Minnesota Opera
Approaching Ali	A Family Opera based on Davis Miller's The Tao of Muhammad Ali	D.J. Sparr	Davis Miller	Washington National Opera
As One	An Opera for Two Voices and String Quartet	Laura Kaminsky	Kimberly Reed	The American Opera Project/Brooklyn Academy of Music
A Flourish of Green	A Mini-Opera based on a Story in Bocaccio's Decameron	Missy Mizzoli		Opera Philadelphia
The Other Room	A Monologue in One Act	Marisa Michelson		Inner Voices
Memory Boy	A Children's Opera based on the Novel by Will Weaver	Reinaldo Moya		Minnesota Opera
Empty the House	An Opera in One Act	Rene Orth		Curtis School of Music/Opera Philadelphia
The Whole Truth	A Comic Opera based on the Short Story by Stephen McCauley	Robert Paterson		American Modern Ensemble
The Good Friar	A Comic Opera in One Act	Martin Hennessy		
Elizabeth Cree	An Opera Adapted from the novel The Trial of Elizabeth Cree by Peter Ackroyd	Kevin Puts		Opera Philadelphia/Chicago Opera Theatre
Some Light Emerges	A Chamber Opera in One Act about the Rothko Chapel	Laura Kaminsky	Kimberly Reed	Houston Grand Opera/HGOCO
Dinner At Eight	An Opera in Two Acts based on the play by George S. Kaufman and Edna Ferber	William Bolcom		Minnesota Opera
The (R)evolution of Steve Jobs	An Opera	Mason Bates		Santa Fe Opera/Seattle Opera/Indiana University Jacobs School of Music/San Francisco Opera
The Nefarious, Immoral But Highly Profitable Enterprise of Mr. Burke & Mr. Hare	An Opera in One Act	Julian Grant		Boston Lyric Opera/Music-Theatre Group
The Summer King	An Opera in Two Acts	Daniel Sonenberg	Daniel Nestor	Pittsburgh Opera/American Opera Project
Today It Rains	An Opera in One Act	Laura Kaminsky	Kimberly Reed	Opera Parallèle
Stonewall	An Opera in One Act	Iain Bell		New York City Opera
Edward Tulane	An Opera in Two Acts after the novel The Miraculous Journey of Edward Tulane by Kate DiCamillo	Paola Prestini		Minnesota Opera
The Secret River	An Opera based on the Novel by Marjorie Kinnan Rawlings	Stella Sung		Opera Orlando
Frida Kahlo and the Bravest Girl in the World	A Children's Opera based on the Book by Laurence Anholt	Joe Illick		Ft. Worth Opera
Supermax	An Opera in 60 Minutes	Stewart Wallace	Michael Korie	Long Beach Opera
again and again. and again.	An Opera based on Corneille's The Comic Illusion	Conrad Cummings		
A Sweet Silence in Cremona	A Comic Opera in One Act	Roberto Scarcella Perino		New York University/Florence Villa la Pietra, Teatro Comunale Ponchielli
Stone Soup	A Children's Opera in One Act	Joe Illick		Ft. Worth Opera
A Thousand Acres	An opera in two acts based on the novel by Jane Smiley	Kristin Kuster		Des Moines Metro Opera
Bernadette's Cozy Book Nook	A Zoom opera in one act	Joe Illick		Ft. Worth Opera
Unruly Sun	An music-theatre work inspired by Derek Jarman's Modern Nature	Matthew Ricketts		Orchestre classique de Montréal, Brott Opera, 21C Music Festival,

== Musicals (lyrics) ==
Title	Description	Composer	Book Writer	Producing company
Splendora	Based on the book by Edward Swift	Stephen Hoffman	Peter Webb	Bay Street Theatre and American Place Theatre
Songs from an Unmade Bed	A solo theatrical song cycle	18 different composers		New York Theatre Workshop
The Sweet Revenge of Louisa May	Based on several Gothic tales by Louisa May Alcott	Stephen Hoffman	Burton Cohen	Olney Theatre
The Audience	A musical written by many authors and composers	Various	Various	The Transport Group
And the Curtain Rises	A Musical about The First Musical	Joseph Thalken	Michael Slade	Signature Theatre (DC)
Chang & Eng	A Musical about the Siamese Twins	Stephen Hoffman	Burton Cohen	NYMT
The Tenants of 3R		Stephen Hoffman		
Irena	A musical about Irena Sendler	Włodek Pawlik	Mary Skinner/ Piotr Piwowarczyk	Teatr Muzyczny w Poznaniu

== Oratorios (text) ==
Title	Description	Composer	Producing company	Citations
Sanctuary Road	An oratorio inspired by the writings of William Still	Paul Moravec	Oratorio Society of New York	
A Nation of Others	An oratorio set on a single day at Ellis Island in 1921	Paul Moravec	Oratorio Society of New York	
All Shall Rise	An oratorio about voters' rights	Paul Moravec	Oratorio Society of New York	
Émigré	About the Jewish community in Shanghai	Aaron Zigman		

== Song cycles (lyrics) ==
- Thoroughfare
  Music by Conrad Cummings
- Eight Phases of Luna
  Music by Kamala Sankaram
- Dear Mayor
  Music by Mark Baechle
- And Another Song Comes On
  Music by Ben Moore
- Six Christmas Traditions
  Music by Jake Heggie
- Some Favored Nook
  Music by Eric Nathan
- The Nothing Lamp Music by Joseph N. Rubinstein
- A Year to the Day: A dramatic song cycle for tenor, violin, cello and piano Music by Lembit Beecher

== Awards and nominations ==
- 2019 GRAMMY Award for Best Opera Recording (The (R)evolution of Steve Jobs)
- 2012 Pulitzer Prize in Music for Silent Night
- Dominic J. Peliciotti Opera Award, A Letter to East 11th Street
- New York State Council on the Arts Award, Today It Rains
- Hewlett Foundation Award, Today It Rains
- First recipient of the Kleban Foundation Award for Lyricist
- 2007 GRAMMY Award nomination for Best Opera Recording for Volpone
- Three Drama Desk Award nominations
- Jonathan Larson Performing Arts Foundation Award
- New York Foundation for the Arts Playwriting Fellowship
- Two Richard Rodgers Awards from the American Academy of Arts and Letters
- Multi-Arts Production (MAP) Fund Grant
- Sundance Institute Theatre Lab Alumnus, Sundance Institute at Ucross Writer's Retreat, MacDowell Colony Fellow, Hermitage Artists Retreat Fellow

== Libretto mentorship programs ==
Mark Campbell has created or helped create opera libretto-writing programs with the following organizations

- The American Opera Project Composers & The Voice

American Lyric Theatre The American Opera Initiative University of Colorado New Opera Workshop Opera Philadelphia's Composer in Residence Program The John Duffy Institute for New Opera

== Recordings ==
- Volpone
  Wolf Trap Recordings
- Music Awake! Choral Music of Paul Moravec
  Bach Festival of Winter Park Recordings
- The Inspector
  Wolf Trap Recordings
- Later the Same Evening
  Albany Records
- Bastianello/Lucrezia
  Bridge Records
- Songs from an Unmade Bed
  Ghostlight Records / Sh-k-boom Records
- Rappahannock County
  Naxos
- The (R)evolution of Steve Jobs
  Pentatone
- As One
  Bright Shiny Things
- Sanctuary Road
  Naxos
- Silent Night Naxos
- New Words (Andrea Marcovicci)
  Cabaret Records
- Greenwich Time (Rebecca Luker)
  PS Classics
- Kiss Me While We Have the Chance (Steve Marzullo)
  Yellow Sound
- In Celebration of Life
  Abrams Gentile
- Broadway Bound (Sarah Jessica Parker/Matthew Broderick)
  Varèse Sarabande
