= American Opera Projects =

Opera company based in New York City

- Formation: 1988
- Founder: Grethe Barrett Holby
- Type: Opera company
- Location: Brooklyn
- Website: www.aopopera.org

American Opera Projects (AOP) is a professional opera company based in Brooklyn, New York City, and is a member of Opera America, the Fort Greene Association, the Downtown Brooklyn Arts Alliance, and the Alliance of Resident Theatres/New York (A.R.T./NY). The company's primary mission is to develop and present new operatic and music theatre works and has gained a reputation for the "rarefied range" of the projects it fosters (Opera News, Dec 2008). AOP was founded in 1988 by Grethe Barrett Holby who served as Artistic Director of AOP from 1988 until 2001, at which point Charles Jarden became the company's Executive Director and Steven Osgood the company's Artistic Director. Steven Osgood left the post of Artistic Director in 2008 to pursue conducting full-time but remains the Artistic Director for AOP's "Composers & the Voice" program.

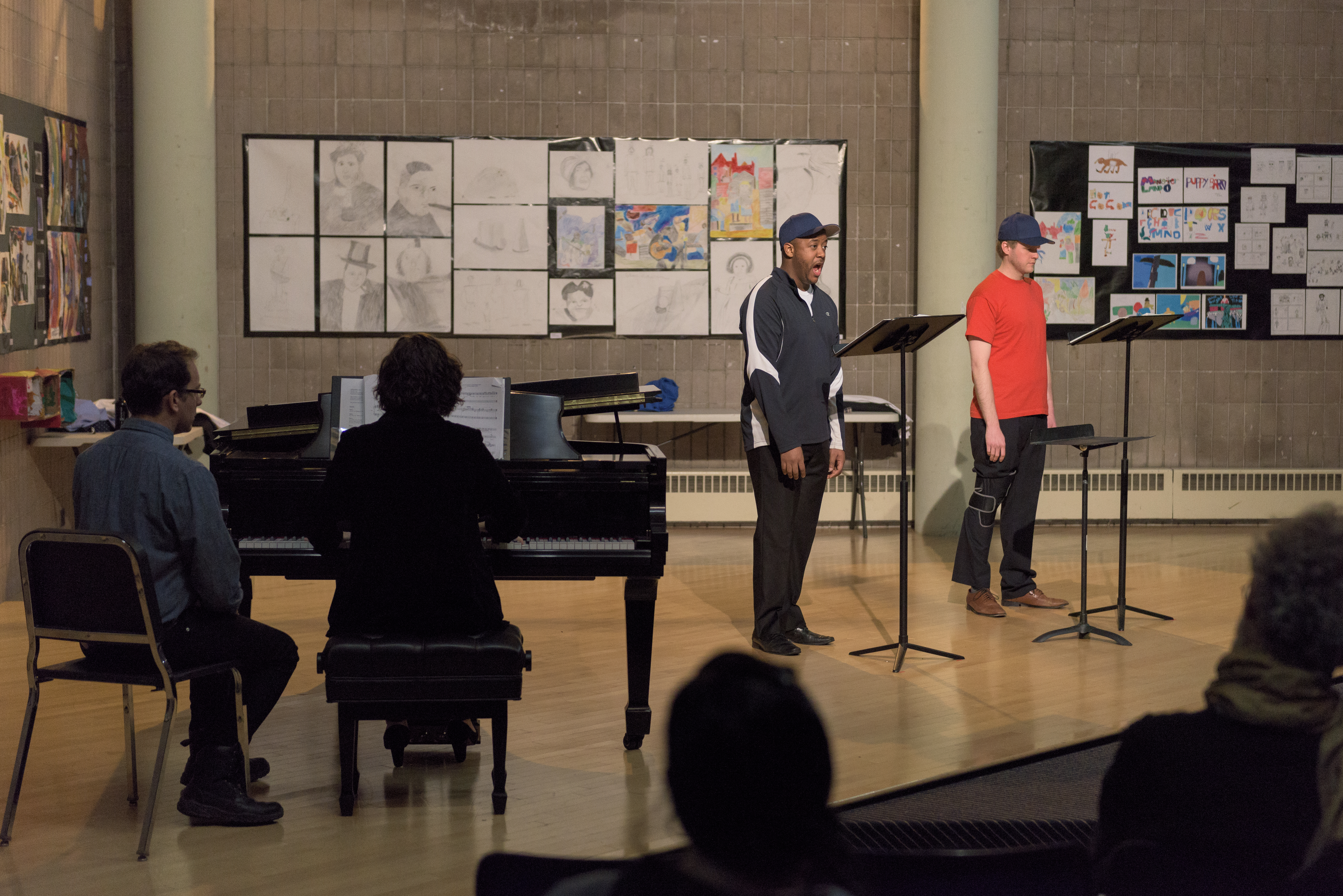
Scene from a performance of Independence Eve in 2015

AOP's year-long writing fellowship, "Composers & the Voice" was created in 2002 to bring emerging operatic composers and librettists together with singers, directors, and other artists to create a series of pieces exploring the potential of theatre and the voice. Past and present mentors for the program include Mark Adamo, Mark Campbell, John Corigliano, Tan Dun, Daron Hagen, Jake Heggie, Libby Larsen, John Musto, Tobias Picker, Kaija Saariaho, and Stephen Schwartz. Past participants include Clint Borzoni, David Claman, Conrad Cummings, Randall Eng, Renée Favand, Vivian Fung, Kristin Kuster, Hannah Lash, Gilda Lyons, Robert Paterson, Jack Perla, Zach Redler & Sara Cooper, Daniel Sonenberg and Alex Weiser.

Amongst the venues and festivals where AOP productions have appeared are the Lincoln Center Festival, BAM's Next Wave Festival, the Guggenheim Museum, Symphony Space, Irondale Center, Philadelphia's Annenberg Center, Pittsburgh Opera, the U.S. Holocaust Memorial Museum, London's Royal Opera House, Berlin's Stükke Theater, Aleksander Fredro Teatr in Poland, the Trondheim Chamber Music Festival in Norway, and the Ensemble Theater am Petersplatz in Vienna. It has also given many out-of-doors performances sponsored by the City of New York Department of Parks and Recreation. AOP won a 2005 Encore award from the Arts & Business Council of New York for its innovative work.

== Operas and other works developed with AOP ==
=== World premieres ===
- As One by Laura Kaminsky, Mark Campbell, and Kimberly Reed (BAM Fisher Center, September 4, 2014)
- Beauty Intolerable by Sheila Silver with texts by Edna St. Vincent Millay (Symphony Space, June 8, 2013)
- Before Night Falls by Jorge Martin and Dolores M. Koch (Fort Worth Opera, May 29, 1010)
- Brooklyn Bones by Alvin Singleton and Patricia Hampl (November 15, 2008)
- Brooklyn Cinderella by Nkeiru Okoye (Dweck Auditorium, June 21, 2011)
- Darkling by Stefan Weisman and Anna Rabinowitz (East 13th Street Theater, February 26, 2006)
- Fade by Stefan Weisman and David Cote (NYC PREMIERE at Galapagos Art Space, July 17, 2009)
- Fireworks by Kitty Brazelton and Billy Aronson (July 2, 2002)
- Flurry Tale by Rusty Magee and Billy Aronson, with commissioned orchestrations by John Rinehimer (Clark Studio Theater, December 18, 1999)
- Harriet Tubman: When I Crossed that Line to Freedom by Nkeiru Okoye (Irondale Center, February 21, 2014)
- Heart of Darkness by Tarik O'Regan and Tom Phillips (Covent Garden, November 1, 2011)
- Judgment of Midas by Kamran Ince and Miriam Seidel (Milwaukee Opera Theatre, February 12, 2013)
- L'abbe Agathon by Arvo Pärt and Tarik O'Regan (Solomon R. Guggenheim Museum, January 11, 2009)
- Love/Hate by Jack Perla and Rob Bailis (San Francisco Opera Center, April 2012)
- Marina: A Captive Spirit by Deborah Drattell and Annie Finch (May 1, 2003)
- Model Love by J. David Jackson based on poems by Henry Normal (Stanley H. Kaplan Penthouse, October 2, 2011)
- Nora, in the Great Outdoors by Daniel Felsenfeld and Will Eno (Stanley H. Kaplan Penthouse, October 2, 2011)
- Out Cold by Phil Kline (BAM Fisher, October 25, 2012)
- Patience and Sarah by Paula M. Kimper and Wende Persons (John Jay College Theater, July 8, 1998)
- Paul's Case by Gregory Spears and Kathryn Walat (Artisphere, April 20, 2013)
- Romulus by Louis Karchin (Guggenheim Museum, May 20, 2007)
- Séance on a Wet Afternoon by Stephen Schwartz (NYC PREMIERE at New York City Opera, April 19, 2011)
- Sir Gawain and the Green Knight by Richard Peaslee and Kenneth Cavander (October 18, 2001)
- State of the Jews by Alex Weiser and Ben Kaplan (Streicker Cultural Center, January 15, 2025)
- The Blind by Lera Auerbach (Lincoln Center. July 9, 2013)
- The Great Dictionary of the Yiddish Language by Alex Weiser and Ben Kaplan (YIVO Institute for Jewish Research, September 18, 2025)
- The Scarlet Ibis by Stefan Weisman and David Cote (HERE Arts Center, January 15, 2015)
- This is the Rill Speaking by Lee Hoiby and Lanford Wilson (Purchase College Opera, April 26, 2008)
- Tone Test by Nick Brooke (Lincoln Center, July 22, 2004)
- Windows by Zach Redler and Sara Cooper (NYU, March 23, 2013)

=== Works developed/in development ===
- 1000 Splendid Suns by Sheila Silver and Stephen Kitsakas
- African Tales by Nkeiru Okoye and Carman Moore
- Alice in the Time of the Jabberwock by Daniel Felsenfeld and Robert Coover
- Companionship by Rachel Peters
- Decoration by Mikael Karlsson and David Floden
- Eichmann in Jerusalem by Mohammed Fairouz and David Shapiro
- Heinrich Heine: Doppelganger by Jacob Engel, Paula Kimper, and Nino Sandow
- Henry's Wife by Randall Eng and Alexis Bernier
- Independence Eve by Sidney Marquez Boquiren and Daniel Neer
- Lost Childhood by Janice Hamer and Mary Azrael (staged workshop premiere at Tel Aviv-Yafo Music Center, July 29, 2007)
- Marymere by Matt Schickele
- Memoirs of Uliana Rooney by Vivian Fine and Sonya Friedman
- Mila by Andrea Clearfield, Jean-Claude van Itallie, and Lois Walden
- Numinous City by Pete M. Wyer and Melissa Salmons
- Our Basic Nature by John Glover and Kelley Rourke
- Prairie Dogs by Rachel Peters and Royce Vavrek
- Rosencrantz and Guildenstern Are Dead by Herschel Garfein
- Semmelweis by Raymond J. Lustig and Matt Gray
- Sharon's Grave by Richard Wargo, based on the play be John B. Keane
- Tesla in New York by Phil Kline and Jim Jarmusch
- The Bridge of San Luis Rey by Paula M. Kimper
- The Companion by Robert Paterson and David Cote
- The Family Room by Thomas Pasatieri and Daphne Malfitano
- The Golden Gate by Conrad Cummings, based on novel by Vikram Seth
- The Leopard by Michael Dellaira and J.D. McClatchy
- The Summer King by Daniel Sonenberg
- The Walled-Up Wife by Gilda Lyons
- The Wanton Sublime, formerly The Woven Child, by Tarik O'Regan and Anna Rabinowitz (NYC premiere at Roulette, April 22, 2014)
- The Weeping Camel by Huang Ruo and Candace Chong
- Three Way by Robert Paterson and David Cote
- Ugetsu by Michael Rose and Emily Howard
- Unruly Horses based on the life and songs of Vladimir Vysotsky, conceived by Mina Yakim and Moni Yakim, with additional book by Peter Kellogg
- Wolf-in-Skins, formerly The Lost Lais of Albion, by Gregory Spears, choreographed by Christopher Williams

== Sources ==
- Kozinn, Allan (December 9, 1990). "New Work by American Opera Projects". The New York Times
- Kozinn, Allan (May 6, 2003). "An Operatic Treatment Of a Russian Poet's Despair". The New York Times
- Ross, Alex (April 24, 1993). "American Operas in Progress". The New York Times
- Singer, Barry (December 2008). "Risky Business ". Opera News, Vol. 73, No. 6
