= Lucas Bouk =

American opera singer

Lucas Bouk is an American opera singer and actor from Rochester, New York. He (Note: Bouk uses he/him and they/them pronouns. This article uses he/him pronouns for consistency.) came out in 2018 as a trans man and played his first role as an openly trans man in a jazz opera character written with him in mind. A play about his transitioning was staged in 2018 and revived in 2019. In June 2019, he became the first openly transgender opera singer in a featured role written for a transgender singer in Stonewall.

== Education and personal life ==
Lucas Bouk grew up in Rochester, New York in a conservative environment, with "misunderstanding, misattunement, and pain" from his conflicted gender identity. He married his high school sweetheart when they were both 21.

Bouk studied at the Cincinnati Conservatory of Music. After graduate school Bouk and his husband had a child together. The pregnancy and birth were extremely difficult for Bouk: "I felt drowned and suffocated by cisgender parenting expectations. My son's existence wasn't the problem, it was all the social norms and expectations surrounding the idea of being a mother that plagued me with anxiety and anger." Bouk initially thought his anger towards casual sexual harassment and the word "mother" was due to being a "staunch feminist"; later the family would stop celebrating gendered holidays.

In 2014, Bouk quit his job, and hoping to boost his career and find himself, moved to Manhattan. Around the same time, in order to feel more comfortable in his body, he started doing yoga and took dance classes.

In September 2017, Bouk began to self-identify as a transgender man and came out to his husband, who was supportive.

In October 2018, Bouk took part in Bumble's worldwide campaign about New Yorkers "discussing their lives and loves."

Bouk began transitioning physically with testosterone and retraining as a baritone in 2021, stating that COVID-19 lockdowns gave him time to retrain that he had previously believed he would not have.

== Career ==
Before coming out, Bouk sang a series of cabaret evenings featuring famous songs for female characters, by Stephen Sondheim, Kurt Weill, Jason Robert Brown, George Gershwin, Cole Porter, and Rodgers & Hammerstein, to "become comfortable inhabiting female characters onstage that I might be able to feel more confident in my body in my actual life". Later he focused on female opera characters, “trapped by circumstance, society and gender”.

In May 2018, as part of New York's 2018 Opera Fest, he came out publicly as a trans man in a new opera, Tabula Rasa, a jazz-inspired work presented by the Cantanti Project, with music by gay composer Felix Jarrar and libretto by Bea Goodwin. The role of dadaist Tristan Tzara was created for Bouk so he could "publicly express [his] new gender identity". It was Bouk's first male role since coming out.

In November 2018, Bouk and Goodwin presented “Mr. Liz Cabaret: Living in the In Between," a coming of age story and cabaret about Bouk’s coming out process, at Alchemical Studio Lab. For the one-man show they used his journal entries, photos, paintings, and memories. It includes painful episodes of being misgendered. The show returned in February 2019 at New York City’s The Tank.

Following his one-man show, he did the transgender-themed As One at Alamo City Opera. As One is a newer opera which has already been performed around the world, telling the story with two characters, Hannah Before and Hannah After, who share insights into the transitioning experience. Bouk portrayed Hannah After.

He then performed in Giacomo Puccini’s Suor Angelica and Gianni Schicchi at St. Petersburg Opera. In May/June 2019 he reprised his role as Hannah Before in As One at Merkin Concert Hall for American Opera Projects and New York City Opera.

In June 2019, Bouk played a featured character in Stonewall, an opera about the 1969 Stonewall riots which had its world premiere in conjunction with Stonewall 50 – WorldPride NYC 2019. Stonewall was commissioned by New York City Opera (NYCO), and features music by Iain Bell, a libretto by Mark Campbell, and direction by Leonard Foglia. Stonewall is the first opera to feature a transgender character written for a transgender singer. Bouk portrays Sarah, a trans woman celebrating the first anniversary of her transitioning.

Since August 2021, he has been performing as a baritone, including roles such as Masetto and Leporello in Don Giovanni, Schaunard in La bohème, Count Almaviva in Le Nozze di Figaro, and Papageno in Die Zauberflöte. He also played the role of Hannah Before in As One in 2022 and 2023, making him the first person to portray both Hannah Before and Hannah After in As One.

== See also ==
- Castrato
- Cross-gender acting
- Feminist views on transgender topics
- List of historical opera characters
- List of lesbian, gay, bisexual, or transgender firsts by year
- Non-binary gender
- Transgender history
- Transgender rights in the United States
