= Kimberly Reed =

American film director and producer

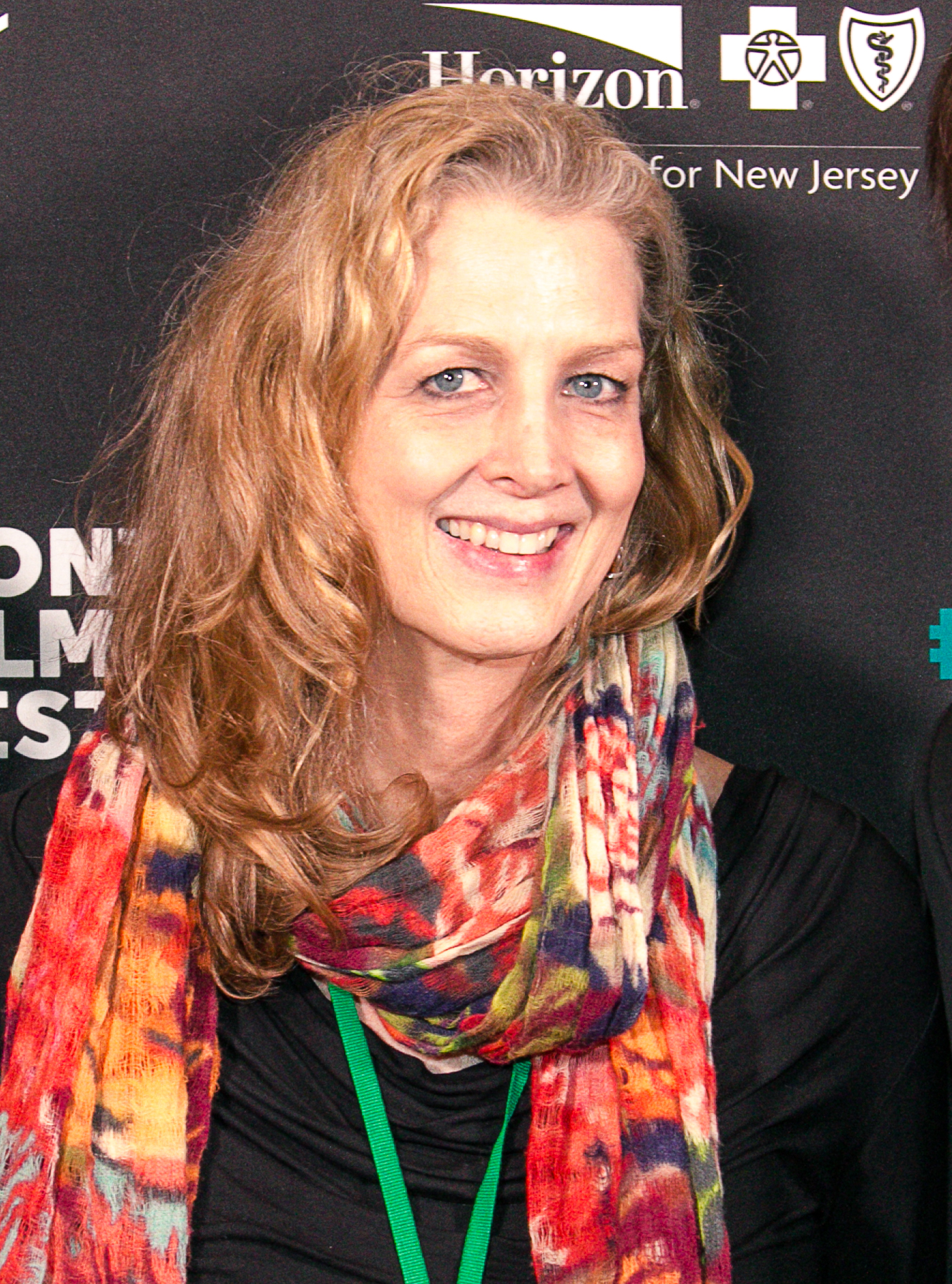
- Reed in 2018
- Born: Montana, U.S.
- Occupations: Film director; film producer
- Notable work: Prodigal Sons; Dark Money
- Website: kimberlyreed.com

Kimberly Reed is an American film director and producer who is best known for her documentaries Prodigal Sons and Dark Money which premiered at the 2018 Sundance Film Festival. In 2007, Filmmaker magazine named her one of the "25 New Faces of Independent Film".

== Early life and education ==
Kimberly Reed was born in Montana to Lorne and Carol McKerrow. Her father was an ophthalmologist. She had an older brother Marc, who was adopted, and a younger brother, Todd. She played quarterback on the Helena High School football team.

Reed, who was assigned male at birth, recalls feeling "just this friction" about her assigned gender and having an epiphany when, at the age of six or seven, she saw Renee Richards on television, and thought "whoa, that's it".

Reed earned a Bachelor of Arts from University of California at Berkeley where she graduated magna cum laude. Reed earned a Master of Arts in film production from San Francisco State University. While in her twenties, she transitioned.

== Career ==
=== Film ===
==== Dark Money ====
Dark Money premiered at the Sundance Film Festival in 2018. Variety describes the film as a "potent investigative piece." In early 2018 the film traveled to several festivals and the rights to the film were purchased by PBS as part of the POV series of documentaries.

==== Prodigal Sons ====
Prodigal Sons is an autobiographical account of Reed's return home to Montana for her 20th high school reunion as a trans woman. The project initially focused on her brother Marc's story and evolved into an exploration of family, sibling rivalry, coming out, and reconciling with the past. It debuted at the Telluride Film Festival in 2008. The Los Angeles Times called it a "succinct, eloquent personal journal". After the release Reed was invited to return to Helena to deliver the 2015 commencement address.

==== Seat 31: Zooey Zephyr ====
Seat 31: Zooey Zephyr documents Zooey Zephyr’s work in the Montana legislature and includes her proposal to her wife Erin Reed. Seat 31: Zooey Zephyr was shortlisted for a 2025 Academy Award nomination in the ‘Documentary Short’ category.

- Big Sky Documentary Film Festival 2024 — Winner of Mini Doc Competition
- Palm Springs International ShortFest 2024 — Best Documentary Short
- Frameline 2024 — Jury Award, Outstanding Documentary Short
- CinemaQ 2024 — Audience Award and Best Short Film

=== Opera ===
Together with Mark Campbell, Reed wrote the libretto for As One, a chamber opera/song cycle composed by Laura Kaminsky. As One is a coming-of-age story about a transgender woman. As One premiered in September 2014 in partnership with American Opera Projects at the Brooklyn Academy of Music.

== Filmography ==
=== Film ===
Year	Film	Role
2008	Prodigal Sons	Director, Editor, Producer
2018	Dark Money	Director, Writer, Cinematographer, Producer
2024	Seat 31: Zooey Zephyr	Director, Writer, Cinematographer, Producer
2024	I'm Your Venus	Director

=== Television ===
Year	Television	Role
2020	Equal	Director (S1, Ep2: Transgender Pioneers)

== Recognition ==
- Filmmaker magazine: filmmakers to watch
- Cinema Eye Honors
- Towleroad: best film character of the year 2009
- Fellowships from Yaddo and NYFA
- Filmmaker Magazine's list of "25 New Faces of Independent Film,"
- IndieWire's top 10 films of 2008.
- Magnet Magazine's best of 2009 list.

== See also ==
- List of transgender film and television directors
