= Approaching Ali =

- Opera by D. J. Sparr
- Librettist: Mark Campbell and Davis Miller
- Based on: The Tao of Muhammad Ali by Davis Miller
- Premiere: June 8, 2013; Washington National Opera, Kennedy Center, Washington, D.C.

Approaching Ali is an opera by composer D. J. Sparr and librettists Mark Campbell and Davis Miller. The inspiration for the opera comes from Miller's story "My Dinner With Ali" and his book The Tao of Muhammad Ali that related the friendship of the writer with the boxer Muhammad Ali.

Approaching Ali: A Chamber Opera in One Act had its world premiere at the Kennedy Center, Washington, D.C., on June 8, 2013, under the directorship of Nicole A. Watson. The opera was commissioned by Washington National Opera. In 2015, the opera was staged by North Carolina Opera. In 2023, the opera was staged by both Opera Las Vegas and Opera Louisiane.

== Roles ==
Roles, voice types, premiere cast
Role	Voice type	Premiere cast, June 8, 2013 Conductor: Steven Jarvi
Davis Miller	baritone	David Kravitz
Muhammad Ali	bass	Soloman Howard
Odessa Clay	soprano	Aundi Moore
Young Davis	boy soprano	Ethan McKelvain
Roy Miller	tenor	Tim Augustin
Sara Miller	mezzo-soprano	Catherine Martin

== Synopsis ==
The story is about a boy in North Carolina in the early 1960s who is galvanized to overcome some traumatic childhood events when he sees Muhammad Ali on television. More than twenty years later, as a writer on the brink of middle age, he now seeks to rekindle that spirit by visiting his boyhood hero in person at his mother's home in Louisville, Kentucky.
