= Wolf Trap Opera Company =

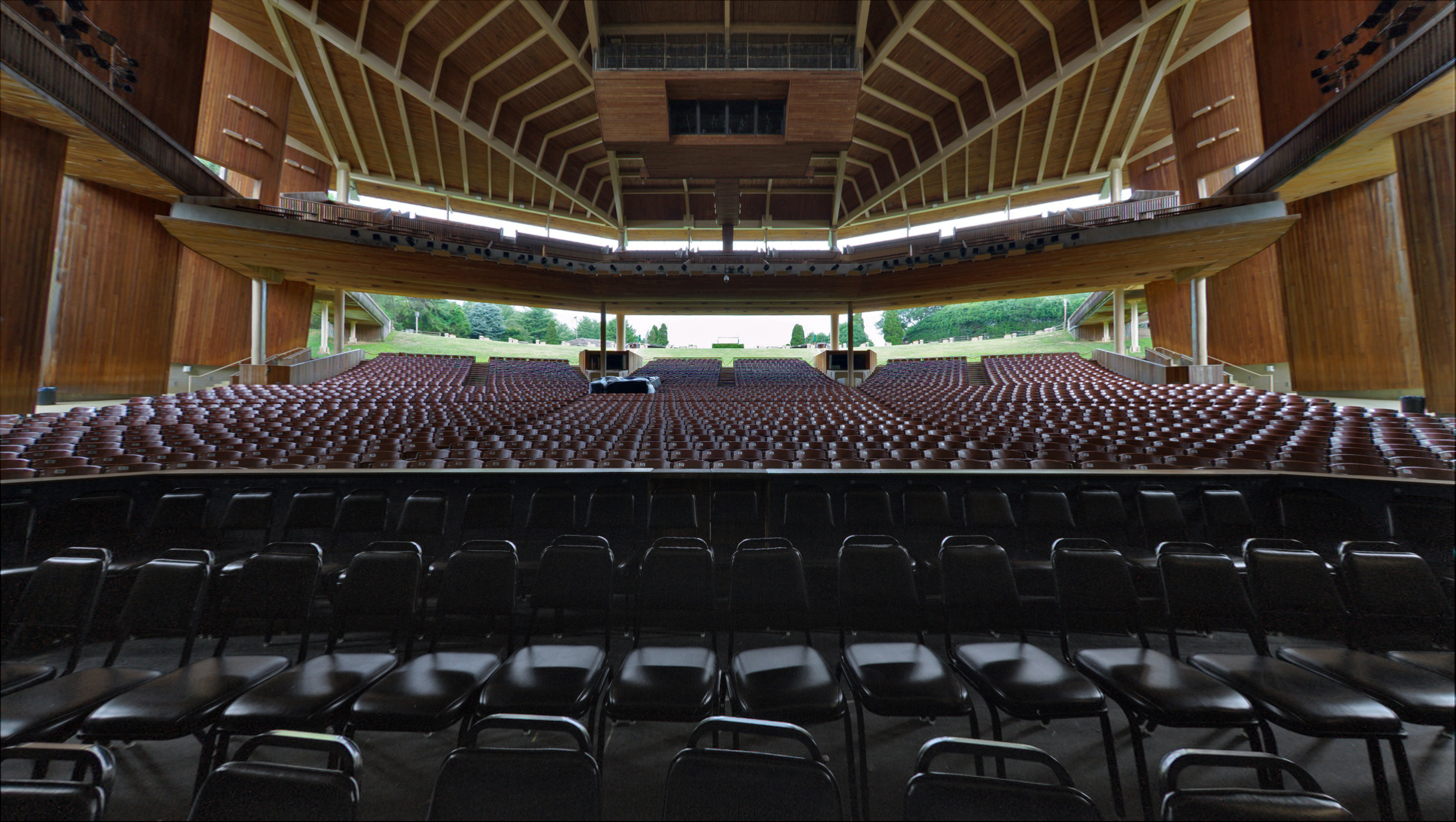
Inside the Filene Center

The Wolf Trap Opera Company (sometimes abbreviated WTOC) was founded in 1971 as part of the program of the Wolf Trap Foundation located near the Wolf Trap National Park for the Performing Arts in Fairfax County, Virginia. The company is a residency and training program for aspiring opera professionals, with its major production being a summer opera festival.

== Mission and development ==
The company's mission is to discover and develop talent in the opera field and to serve young singers by giving them training and performance experience with opera productions, concerts and recitals each summer at the Filene Center and The Barns at Wolf Trap. Productions also feature the work of rising directors, conductors, designers, coaches, stage managers, scenic artists, and technicians.

The company typically presents three operas at the Filene Center and/or The Barns at Wolf Trap. In addition, recitals and other performances take place. Wolf Trap Opera also regularly presents operatic rarities in full production.

== Achievements ==
Over 90% of recent Filene Young Artists are working as professional singers. Among notable alumni are Stephanie Blythe (1995 and 1996), Lawrence Brownlee (2001), Elizabeth Futral (1991), Denyce Graves (1989), Christine Goerke (1995), Nathan Gunn (1994 and 1995), Beverly Hoch (1980), Lisa Hopkins (2007), Michael Maniaci (2002), Simon O'Neill (2003), Dawn Upshaw (1985), Jennifer Larmore (1983), Mark Delavan (1988), Paul Austin Kelly (1987), James Maddalena (1975, 1976, and 1977), Mary Dunleavy (1993 and 1994), Robert Orth (1975, 1976, and 1979), Rockwell Blake (1974 and 1976), Richard Croft (1985), and Anna Christy (2000 and 2001).

In December 2009, the Company's 2007 live recording of John Musto's Volpone was nominated for a Grammy Award in the category of Best Opera Recording.

== Commissioned composers ==
Lee Anne Myslewski, vice-president for opera and classical programming at Wolf Trap, conceived of the UNTRAPPED series of programming in 2016 and has featured artistic partnerships with the Shakespeare Theatre, Taffety Punk, Halcyon, AMP at Strathmore, as well as ongoing partnerships with The Phillips Collection, the Library of Congress and the National Orchestral Institute + Festival. Under the direction of Myslewski, Wolf Trap Foundation for the Performing Arts has commissioned new works by living composers including Caroline Shaw, Derek Bermel, Edward W. Hardy, Jake Heggie, John Musto, Mark Campbell, Mark-Anthony Turnage and Samuel Adler.

== See also ==
- List of opera festivals
