= Stonewall (opera) =

2019 opera by Iain Bell

- Opera by Iain Bell
- Librettist: Mark Campbell
- Language: English
- Premiere: 21 June 2019; New York City Opera, Rose Theater, Jazz at Lincoln Center

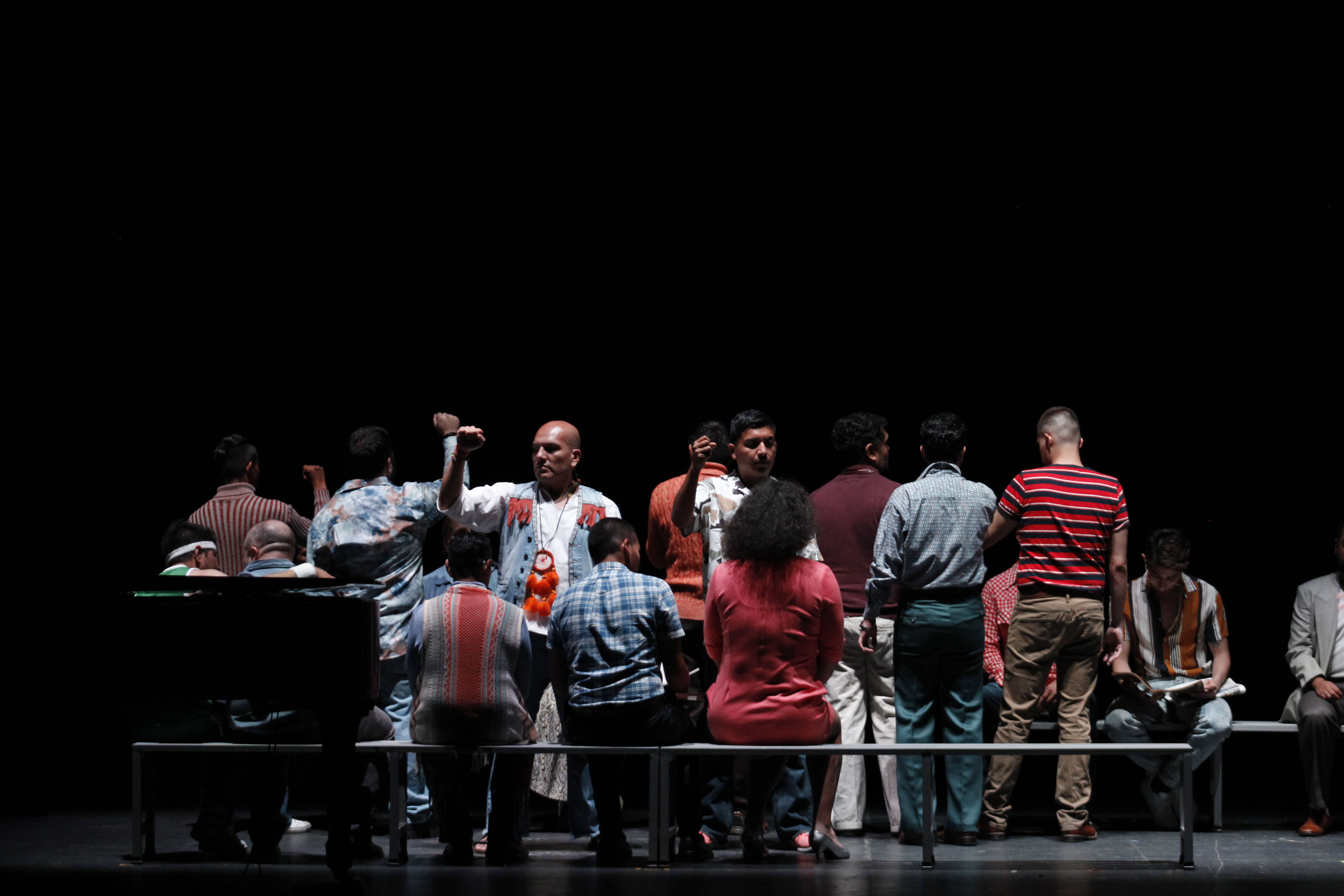
Scene from a 2022 production in Mexico City

Stonewall is an American opera about the 1969 Stonewall riots, the spark of the modern LGBTQ rights movement, which received its world premiere June 2019 in conjunction with Stonewall 50 – WorldPride NYC 2019, projected to be the world's largest LGBTQ event. Stonewall was commissioned by New York City Opera (NYCO), and features music by Iain Bell, libretto by Pulitzer Prize-winning Mark Campbell, and direction by Leonard Foglia. The production is a 2019 Pride Initiative of the NYCO, an annual production of an LGBT-focused work each June in commemoration of Gay Pride Month. The opera premiered in June 2019 at the Rose Theater at Jazz at Lincoln Center. The opera was produced to honor both the 50th anniversary of the Stonewall Riots, and the 75th anniversary of the NYCO. Stonewall is the first opera to feature a transgender character written for an openly transgender singer, mezzo-soprano Liz Bouk.

== NYCO Pride Initiatives ==
Previous NYCO Pride Initiative productions have been 2018's American composer Charles Wuorinen's Brokeback Mountain based on Annie Proulx's 1997 short story "Brokeback Mountain", and 2017's Hungarian composer Péter Eötvös's Angels in America, an adaptation of Tony Kushner's play. Although NYCO has been active since 1943, it was revived in 2016 after a 2013 bankruptcy after which the Pride Initiative started. Stonewall is the first commissioned work of the revived NYCO. NYCO has faced fundraising challenges because of the bankruptcy but is hoping Stonewall will help revive finances.

== Origins ==
The Stonewall Riots a series of spontaneous, violent demonstrations by the LGBT community against yet another police raid that took place in the early morning hours of June 28, 1969, at the Stonewall Inn in Greenwich Village, is widely considered to constitute the most important event leading to the gay liberation movement and the modern fight for LGBT rights in the United States.

Gay Americans in the 1950s and 1960s faced an anti-gay legal system. (Note: Illinois decriminalized sodomy in 1961, but at the time of the Stonewall riots every other state criminalized homosexual acts, even between consenting adults acting in private homes. "An adult convicted of the crime of having sex with another consenting adult in the privacy of his or her home could get anywhere from a light fine to five, ten, or twenty years—or even life—in prison. In 1971, twenty states had 'sex psychopath' laws that permitted the detaining of homosexuals for that reason alone. In Pennsylvania and California sex offenders could be committed to a psychiatric institution for life, and [in] seven states they could be castrated." Through the 1950s and 1960s, castration, emetics, hypnosis, electroshock therapy, and lobotomies were used by psychiatrists to try to "cure" homosexuals.) The last years of the 1960s, however, were very contentious, as many social/political movements were active, including the civil rights movement, the counterculture of the 1960s, and the anti–Vietnam War movement. These influences, along with the liberal environment of Greenwich Village, served as catalysts for the Stonewall riots.

The NYCO relaunched from bankruptcy in January 2016 and had to cut the schedule from sixteen performances of four operas in 2017–18 to just Stonewall this season, plus several works in smaller venues. Stonewall was commissioned by the NYCO and its General Director Michael Capasso who matched up composer Iain Bell, and librettist Mark Campbell. They only had nine months to complete the project as although it had been shortlisted, the coincidence of the two event anniversaries coinciding had not been realized. When asked what they hoped audiences would remember from the experience they agreed, when diverse people band together they can end oppression.

Campbell was honored to do the work, even if at a very fast pace – a few weeks for the first draft, being gay and having been to the Stonewall Inn regularly. Bell worked on the score after finishing Jack the Ripper: The Women of Whitechapel, he describes Stonewall as being a joy with such a diverse cast of characters to score.

== Characters ==
Campbell based the characters on “the diverse people I’ve had the privilege to know and love as a gay man who has lived in downtown New York for several decades”, from his imagination rather than composites. He attempted to demonstrate how they were harassed in their daily lives and ultimately united “with humor, rage, and finally hope to rise up against the police”.

The characters and singers who portrayed them include:

- Maggie (portrayed by Lisa Chavez), a butch lesbian dealing with police brutality,
- Carlos (Brian James Myer), a gay Dominican-American English teacher who loses his job,
- Renata (Jordan Weatherston Pitts), aka Maynard, an African-American drag queen,
- Valerie (Rocky Eugenio Sellers), Renata's sister, another transvestite,
- Larry (Marc Heller), an NYPD deputy inspector,
- Sarah (Lucas Bouk), a trans woman hippie celebrating the first anniversary of her transitioning,
- Edward (Justin Ryan), a closeted financial adviser,
- Andy (Andrew Bidlack), a white teen kicked out of his home, who lives on the streets,
- Leah (Jessica Fishenfeld), a Jewish lesbian,
- Sal, a Mafia – controlled club manager – Michael Corvino
- Troy, a straight gogo boy who is a gay-for-pay hustler and uses drugs – Joseph Beutel
- Police officers:
  - Cahn: Peter Kendall Clark
  - Giordano: John Allen Nelson
  - Andrews: Andrew Wannigman
  - Romano: Michael Kuhn
  - Economides: Julia Snowden
  - Williams: Kristin Renee Young
  - Hennessey: Michael Boley

Additional cast members included Michael Corvino; Carolyn Kuan conducted. Richard Stafford was the choreographer.

== Music ==
Iain Bell said about writing the music, “it was a joy to be able to wink to various elements of 1960s music-making throughout, so riffs are explored and harmonic progressions are occasionally more reminiscent of those of popular music of the time”. He wrote two jukebox songs, recorded with iconic girl group legend Darlene Love, with lyrics by Campbell opening part 2. "A jukebox features 'Today's The Day' about a wedding, and 'Better Days Ahead', a sad song in the style of Shirley Bassey."

== Plot ==
Over 75 minutes the story takes place in three parts, all in New York City; first part in many locations, then at the Stonewall Inn, both inside and out, and then ultimately on Christopher Street before dawn.

== See also ==
- Conversion therapy
- Intersectionality
- LGBT culture

== Notes and references ==
=== Sources ===
- Adam, Barry D. (1987). The Rise of a Gay and Lesbian Movement. Boston: Twayne Publishers. ISBN 0805797149. OCLC 14904421 – via Internet Archive.
- Carter, David (2004). Stonewall: The Riots That Sparked the Gay Revolution (1st ed.). New York: St. Martin's Press. ISBN 0312200250. OCLC 54079526.
- Katz, Jonathan (1976). Gay American History: Lesbians and Gay Men in the U.A.A. – A Documentary. New York: Crowell. ISBN 0690011652. OCLC 2020591.
