= Prodigal Sons (film) =

- Directed by: Kimberly Reed
- Produced by: Kimberly Reed
- Distributed by: First Run Features
- Release dates: August 29, 2008 (Telluride); February 26, 2010 (United States)
- Country: United States
- Language: English

Prodigal Sons is a 2008 American documentary produced and directed by Kimberly Reed.

== Background ==
In the 1960s Carol McKerrow is a married woman living in Montana. She and her husband Loren, believing that she is infertile, adopt a baby boy they name Marc. Carol is surprised to discover that on the day they bring home Marc, she probably became pregnant with her first biological child. The child appears to be a perfectly physically fit boy. Carol names the child Paul. Soon, another child, Todd, is born.

== Plot ==
Paul becomes a high achiever: a high school football hero, socially popular, named "best looking," and the class valedictorian. Paul however, since kindergarten, has felt that something was askew with the male gender that was assigned at birth. Paul begins to discover that she is transgender and changes her name to Kimberly Reed. She eventually transitions into a confident and successful woman in society, and also happens to be lesbian. Kim's younger brother, Todd, eventually comes out as gay as well.

Reed eventually becomes a film maker and decides to make a documentary about her return home to Montana for her high school reunion. She documents her interaction with family, old friends and classmates as she tries to educate others on what it means to be transgender. She also documents her attempts at reconciling her relationship with her adopted brother Marc, who struggles to see her as female. She discovers many revelations on her journey including, among several other things, Marc's shocking blood relationship as the secret grandson of Orson Welles and Rita Hayworth.

In the movie, the intense sibling rivalry and unforeseeable twists of plot force Kim's family to face serious challenges. Marc's mental health seriously declines throughout the documentary until he is voluntarily admitted to a mental health facility. At the same time, Kim learns to accept her entire past, including her childhood and early adulthood, in which she lived her life as male.

The documentary explores how growing up trans affects a person's development within their family and in society. It also shows how mental illness can challenge familial relationships and serve as a stumbling block to understanding modern changes in family dynamics.

Kimberly Reed and her mother Carol appeared on The Oprah Winfrey Show "Transgender Transition" on February 11, 2010, to discuss Kim's life and the documentary.

=== Aftermath ===
Marc McKerrow's biological mother, Rebecca Welles (Manning), secretly gave birth to a son on March 31, 1966, when she was 21. Orson Welles never knew about his grandson. Rita Hayworth arranged the adoption of her grandson and did not allow Rebecca to see or hold her son. When Marc was 21, he was in a car accident that resulted in a traumatic brain injury. This injury resulted in severe mental challenges to his health and required intense medical treatment to control violent outbursts.

Rebecca Welles died on October 17, 2004—the birthday of her mother, Rita Hayworth—at the age of 59.

Marc McKerrow requested, through the courts, that his adoption file be opened. Through the adoption agency Marc discovered his true lineage and contacted his biological mother, Rebecca Welles, shortly before her death. According to Chris Welles Feder, Rebecca's eldest sister, a meeting between Marc and Rebecca never took place due to the aggressive advanced-stage cancer that quickly overtook her. Marc attended her funeral.

Marc McKerrow died suddenly in his sleep on June 18, 2010 at the age of 44, only four months after Kimberly Reed's appearance on Oprah. His death was "...caused by complications from a nocturnal seizure" related to his car accident.

== Release ==
Prodigal Sons premiered in the 2008 Telluride Film Festival and was theatrically released February 23, 2009 at Cinema Village in New York City. It was released on DVD in July 2010.

== Reception ==
On review aggregator website Rotten Tomatoes, the film holds an approval rating of 87% based on 30 reviews, with an average rating of 7.7/10.

== Awards ==
Winner

- FIPRESCI Prize at the Thessaloniki Documentary Film Festival
- Best Documentary Jury Prize at NewFest NYC LGBT Festival
- Best Documentary at Copenhagen LGBT Festival

Special Jury Prizes

- Fearless Filmmaking at the Florida Film Festival
- Bravery in Storytelling at the Nashville Film Festival

== Film festivals ==
- DocPoint International Film Festival
- PRIDE Film Festival
- Spokane International Film Festival
- Melbourne Queer Film Festival
- Miami Gay and Lesbian Film Festival
- Prism Film Festival
