= Milwaukee Opera Theatre =

Theatre in Milwaukee, Wisconsin

- Abbreviation: MOT
- Formation: 1998
- Founder: Charissa York Glazner
- Purpose: Opera and musical theatre company
- Headquarters: Milwaukee, Wisconsin
- Website: www.milwaukeeoperatheatre.org

Milwaukee Opera Theatre, known colloquially as MOT, is a professional opera and musical theatre company that originated in Milwaukee, Wisconsin. Founded in 1998, MOT produces at least four projects each season, ranging from the classic to the contemporary, with a special affinity for locally sourced work. MOT also offers complimentary monthly Voice Lab workshops to area singers, both emerging artists and established professionals. The company is currently run by Producing Artistic Director Jill Anna Ponasik.
