= Nick Brooke =

American composer (born 1968)

Nick Brooke (born December 26, 1968) is an American composer, musician, arranger, thereminist, instrument builder, and researcher of early musical automata. He was born in Manchester, New Hampshire.

== Biography ==
Brooke mixes musical sampling, lipsynching, and theater into an idiosyncratic genre. In many of his works, vocalists and actors are trained to mimic sampled collages of sound effects, pop songs, and musical ephemera, blurring the line between recording and live performance.

Brooke’s instrumental works have been performed by the Paul Dresher Ensemble, the Nash Ensemble of London, Orchestra 2001, Dan Druckman, Speculum Musicae, and New York’s Gamelan Son of Lion. During a two-year fellowship in Central Java, Brooke studied gamelan and collaborated on musical projects with Javanese composers, dancers, and visual artists.

His work Tone Test received its premiere at the Lincoln Center Festival in 2004. Previews on NPR and in the New York Times documented its innovative aesthetic.

His 2013 album, Border Towns (Innova Recordings), was inspired by Mexican "border blasters," high-powered radio stations that encroached on U.S. broadcast airspace during the 1950s.

Brooke holds degrees in music composition and philosophy from Oberlin College, and a Ph.D. from Princeton. He teaches at Bennington College.
