= D. J. Sparr =

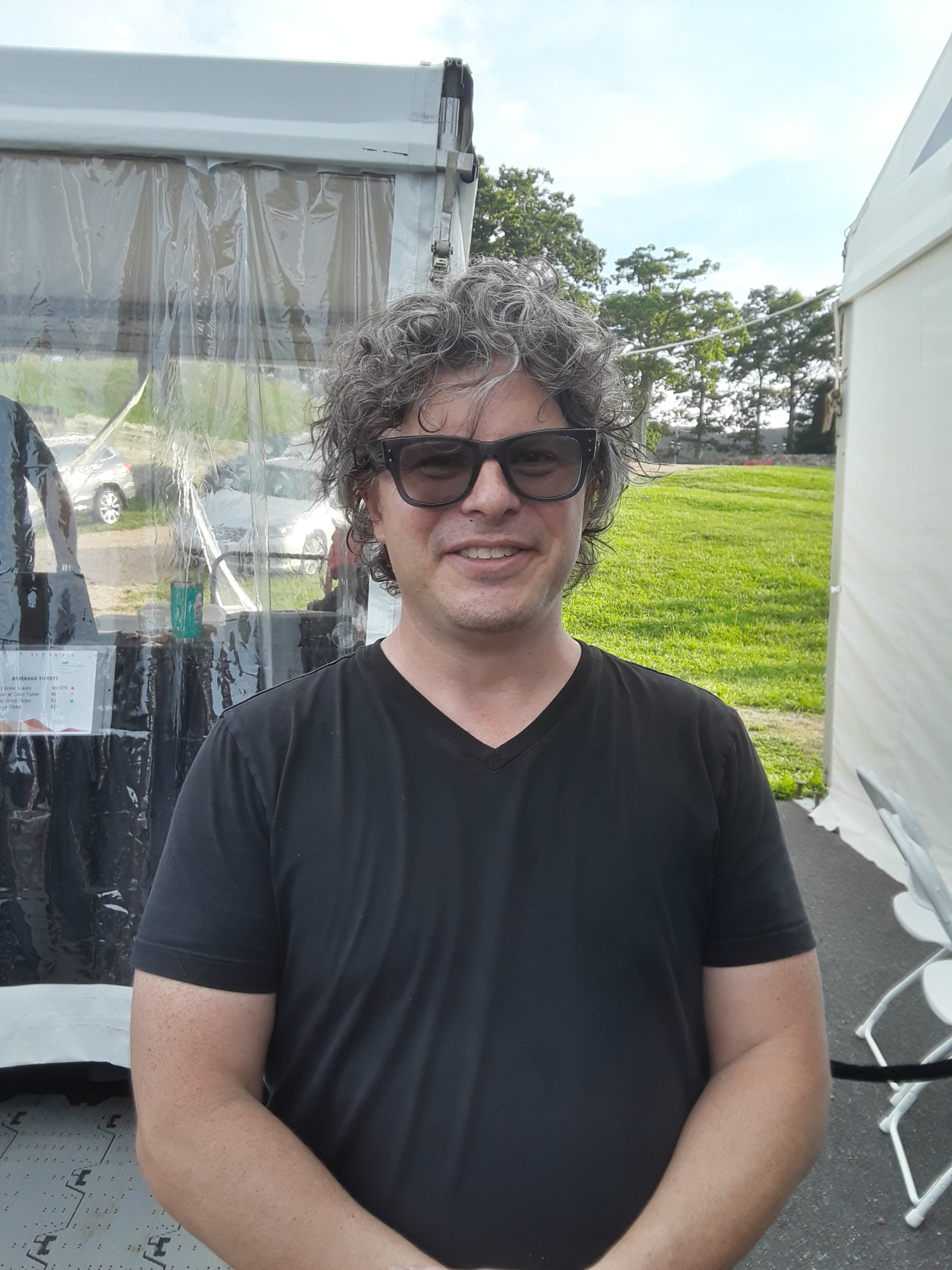
- D. J. Sparr after premiering Daron Hagen's concerto Film Noir in July 2023

Background information
- Born: 1975 (age 50–51); Westminster, MD
- Genre: Contemporary classical
- Occupations: Composer & Guitarist
- Instrument: Guitar
- Years active: 1995-present
- Labels: Innova Recordings, Naxos Records, Centaur Records
- Website: www.djsparr.com

D. J. Sparr (Donald Joseph Sparr, Jr. born October 18, 1975) is an American composer and electric guitar soloist. He is influenced by impressionism and postminimalism, and is one of the preeminent composer-performers of his generation. Sparr's notable compositions include his one-act opera, Approaching Ali (libretto by Mark Campbell and Davis Miller) based on the work "The Tao of Muhammad Ali" by Davis Miller (2013), Concerto for Jazz Guitar and Orchestra: Katrina (2016), Violet Bond: Concerto for electric guitar and orchestra (2013), Dreams of the Old Believers for Orchestra (2014), Optima Vota for Orchestra (2012), Precious Metal: Concerto for flute and winds (2010), The Glam Seduction (2004), Woodlawn Drive (1999), Sound Harmonies with Air (2009), DACCA : DECCA : GaFfA (2008).

As an electric guitar soloist, he has performed concertos by Michael Daugherty, Kenneth Fuchs, Derek Bermel, Steven Mackey, Daron Hagen and himself with New World Symphony, Alabama Symphony, Buffalo Philharmonic, and Cabrillo Festival Orchestra, among others. He has performed with ensembles such as Eighth Blackbird, New Music Raleigh, and the Aspen Contemporary Ensemble. His performance of GLACIER for electric guitar and orchestra with London Symphony Orchestra and JoAnn Falletta was one of four concertos included on the all-Kenneth Fuchs 2018 GRAMMY award winning recording released by Naxos.

Sparr's eclectic style has been described as "pop-Romantic … iridescent and wondrous" (The Mercury News) and "suits the boundary erasing spirit of today's new-music world" (The New York Times). The Los Angeles Times praised him as "an excellent soloist," and the Santa Cruz Sentinel says that he "wowed an enthusiastic audience … Sparr's guitar sang in a near-human voice."

His music has been performed and commissioned by numerous ensembles, including the Washington National Opera, Houston Grand Opera (HGOco, Chicago Youth Symphony Orchestras, the Albany Symphony Orchestra, eighth blackbird, & the Dayton Philharmonic. He is the recipient of the $10,000 Grand Prize in the orchestra category for the BMG/Williams College National Young Composers Competition, was an alternate for the 1998-9 Rome Prize from the American Academy in Rome, and has won two BMI Student Composer Awards.

Dr. Sparr is a graduate of the Baltimore School for the Arts and received his Bachelor of Music degree from the Eastman School of Music. He completed his Doctor of Musical Arts degree from the University of Michigan in 2003. His composition teachers include Michael Daugherty, Augusta Read Thomas, Sydney Hodkinson, and Pulitzer Prize winners William Bolcom, Christopher Rouse, and Joseph Schwantner.

D. J. has held residencies with numerous orchestras. Most recently he was the curator for the Lubbock Symphony Orchestra SOUND! series from 2018-2020. From 2011-2014 he was the Young American Composer-in-Residence with the California Symphony. He was the composer-in-residence with the Richmond Symphony Orchestra's education and community engagement department from 2009-2011.
