= As One (opera) =

Chamber opera by Laura Kaminsky

- Chamber opera by Laura Kaminsky
- Librettist: Mark Campbell and Kimberly Reed
- Language: English
- Premiere: September 4, 2014; American Opera Projects at the Brooklyn Academy of Music
- Website: https://www.asoneopera.com/history

As One is a chamber opera for two voices and a string quartet composed and created by Laura Kaminsky with librettists Mark Campbell and Kimberly Reed. It is a coming-of-age story about transgender woman Hannah, depicting her journey through her transition. The opera premiered in September 2014 at the Brooklyn Academy of Music.

== Roles ==
Role	Voice type	Premiere cast, September 4, 2014 (Conductor: Steven Osgood)
Hannah Before	Baritone	Kelly Markgraf
Hannah After	Mezzo-soprano	Sasha Cooke
String quartet		Fry Street Quartet

== Synopsis ==
Hannah is a transgender woman (portrayed by two singers, Hannah Before (a baritone) and Hannah After (a mezzo-soprano)). During the scenes, Hannah discovers her gender identity and learns to love herself in a world where she is not accepted. The opera is approximately 75 minutes long.

The opera is composed of two parts. Each part represents essential moments of Hannah's coming of age through a series of episodes.

=== Part I ===
The first section of the opera describes Hannah's feeling of unease in her high school and loneliness in the world. In the climax of Part I, she is reassured that she is not alone and learns she is not the only person to feel this way.

=== Part II ===
In the second part, Hannah is experiencing life in a far larger and more complicated world. She experiences college, hormone therapy, and her complicated relationship with her family. In a review for OperaWire, David Salazar describes the section as follows: "We see her navigate two cities, the distance from her loved ones, and the danger of an assault before eventually escaping to nature to find the equation that will help her find her happiness."

== Music and instrumentation ==
The opera is scored for a string quartet and two singers, and consists of 15 discrete songs which depict important moments in Hannah's life throughout her coming-of-age story.

== Selected past productions ==
2014–present
Date	Company	Location	Performers
September 4, 2014 (world premiere)	American Opera Projects in association with The Brooklyn Academy Of Music	BAM Fisher Center, Brooklyn, NY	Sasha Cooke, mezzo-soprano; Kelly Markgraf, baritone; Ken Cazan, director; The Fry Street Quartet; Steven Osgood; music director
November 11, 2016	Seattle Opera	Washington Hall	Taylor Raven, mezzo-soprano; Jorell Williams, baritone; L. Zane Jones, director; St. Helen's Quartet; John Keene, conductor
November 10, 2017	San Diego Opera	Joan B. Kroc Theatre	Blythe Gaissert, mezzo-soprano; Kelly Markgraf, baritone; Kyle Lang, director; Hausmann Quartet; Bruce Stasyna, conductor
November 8, 2019	Columbus Opera	Southern Theatre	Blythe Gaissert, mezzo-soprano; Michael Kelly, baritone; Matthew Gray, director; Alexandra Enyart, conductor

== Recording ==
Year	Cast	Conductor	Label	Publisher
2014	Mezzo-soprano Sasha Cooke (Hannah after), baritone Kelly Markgraf (Hannah before) and the Fry Street Quartet	Steven Osgood	Bright Shiny Things	Bill Holab Music

== Critical reception ==
The critical reception for this opera was positive. The Los Angeles Times stated that As One has a "warm heart" and "approaches admirable universality." Opera News described the music as "grounded by a rhythmic pulse that, like Hannah, retains its core identity but transitions through the opera from driving pizzicatos to a hypnotizing ostinato", and stated that the opera "haunts and challenges its audience with questions about identity, authenticity, compassion and the human desire for self-love and peace." The New York Times said that the score "has deliberately ugly moments of slips and slides, but generally pulsates in a light post-Minimalism", and that "As One forces you to think, simultaneously challenging preconceptions and inspiring empathy." Washington Post praised the opera, saying "As One, which opened last weekend… proved to be a thoughtful and substantial piece as well as that rarest of operatic commodities — a story that lends itself to dramatization in music." The Washington Post described its music as portraying "fiddling and Americana; now, through halting dissonances, the pain of a difficult place in the road; now, through the juxtaposition of plucked violin and singing cello, the exploration of two voices merging into a single identity." For the Long Beach Opera review, Bondo Wyszpolski stated that "This opera doesn’t preach or ask for our pity, but lures us with its compelling story of discovery and growth and even fulfillment. We feel compassion and gain a greater understanding of the human condition, regardless of who or what that person is."

== 2022 Colombian production ==
In 2025 Shalva Ramishvi on POSTV said that USAID provided the Bogata production of As One with $47,000, a claim widely repeated along with other similar claims, during Trump and Musk's attempt to close USAID. The director said, and fact checkers confirmed, that the funding was from the State Department, and was for $25,000.
