= The Summer King (opera) =

Opera

- Opera by Daniel Sonenberg
- Librettist: Daniel Nester, Daniel Sonenberg
- Language: English
- Premiere: April 29, 2017; Pittsburgh Opera

The Summer King is a 2017 opera in two acts by American composer Daniel Sonenberg, with a libretto by poet Daniel Nester and Sonenberg, and additional lyrics by Mark Campbell. Its story follows the life of baseball legend Josh Gibson, from his early days on Pittsburgh's North Side to the Negro leagues, and finally achieving immortality as the second Negro league player to be inducted in the National Baseball Hall of Fame. The Summer King had its world premiere at Pittsburgh Opera in Pittsburgh, Pennsylvania on April 29, 2017.

== Background and inception ==
Composer Sonenberg was so taken with the subject of Negro league baseball great Josh Gibson, that he devoted thirteen years of his life to writing an opera about the legend. Said to be a "hulking catcher," Gibson's remarkable skills at bat gained him the nickname: "The Black Babe Ruth". Along with Jackie Robinson, Gibson was integral in the dismantling of segregated baseball, but never got the chance to play in the Major Leagues. Gibson died at the age of 35 on January 20, 1947.

The Summer King was first commissioned by "Portland Ovations" at Merrill Auditorium in Portland, Maine. With financial support from such foundations as American Opera Projects, the National Endowment for the Arts, and Andrew W. Mellon Foundation, it was scheduled to close out the 2013-2014 season. In addition, it was chosen to be included in Opera America's New Works Forum. On January 15, 2014 in New York City, Opera America's New Works Forum staged selected readings from the opera.

== Synopsis ==
The Summer King focuses on certain aspects of Gibson's life. The first being his key involvement in the Negro leagues of America. Next to Jackie Robinson (who broke the color barrier three months after Gibson died), Gibson is seen as a pioneer in this leap between segregation to integration in baseball; although he never set out to achieve such a goal. As composer Sonenberg states in an interview, "[Gibson] wasn't passionate about breaking the color barrier. He wasn't political. He was a ballplayer, and he loved the game." Second, his unrivaled talents on the playing field. Gibson not only hit more home runs than Babe Ruth, but he was a remarkable catcher, and is even said to have knocked a ball out of Yankee Stadium. His untimely death at 35 in 1947 from a brain tumor, coupled with a tragic life — he never fully recovered after his wife died giving birth to twins and was a victim of alcoholism and drug abuse —, supplies the third element of the opera.

== Performance history ==
The first performances of The Summer King were presented as "concert excerpts" from the opera. "American Opera Projects of New York" presented selections on April 29, 2005 with Steven Osgood, conductor. On August 27, 2007, a stage reading of 2 scenes from Act 1 was given with Elizabeth Scott, conductor.

On May 8, 2014, a "concert version" of the opera was performed with Steven Osgood as music director at Merrill Auditorium in Portland, Maine. The performing company consisted of a contracted lead ensemble, the Boy Singers of Maine, Vox Nova Chamber Singers and a 16 member orchestra, with Stephen Salters as Gibson, Candice Hoyes as his wife, and Lori-Kaye Miller, Gibson's girlfriend Grace. National Opera companies were in attendance, including the Pittsburgh Opera; which invited Sonenberg to premiere the opera on its following season program.

Sean Gibson, Gibsons's great-grandson, was a guest attendee at the performance.

In anticipation of the performance, a panel discussion entitled "The Summer King in Winter - A Panel Discussion on Integration and the Demise of the Negro Baseball Leagues" with the composer leading a talk on the characters from the opera took place. Bass Kenneth Kellogg sang a selection from the opera. Kellogg later went on to star as Gibson's friend Sam in the Pittsburgh premiere.

The world premiere took place at Pittsburgh Opera on Saturday, April 29, 2017 with Antony Walker, conductor and Sam Helfrich, director. Alfred Walker played Gibson, Jacqueline Echols his wife Helen, and Denyce Graves, Grace. It was noted that players from the Pittsburgh Steelers and Pittsburgh Pirates made special cameo appearances on stage, as did Gibson's great-grandson.

The Summer King is slated for production in May 2018 with Michigan Opera Theatre.

== Reception ==
Although the initial reviews for early performances seemed tentative and even critical at times, the over-all reception toward the 2014 "in concert" performance and the 2017 world premiere were well received.

Portland Press Herald reporter, Bob Keyes, who followed the story from its initial start to the premiere, reported that (after a falling out with librettist Daniel Nester) Sonenberg took to task of re-writing the libretto himself following the 2014 performance and its critiques of character development. Teaming up with lyricist Mark Campbell, the two created a new aria for Gibson. Keyes later reported that at the Pittsburgh premiere, the curtain call lasted for "several minutes" and the composer took several bows.

The Pittsburgh Post-Gazette pointed out certain flaws within the opera's libretto and cavalcade of characters, stating, while the "multitude of characters is confusing ... the action progresses in swift cinematic fragments, some segments go on too long, and the scenes after the protagonist dies seem superfluous and anticlimactic. However, its praise struck a home-run in the Opera Company's staged production and the composer's score: "Mr. Sonenberg is well suited to this eclectic mix" of musical genre ranging from "classical and jazz styles, ragtime, mariachi and big band swing."
