= Davis Miller =

American writer

Davis Miller is an American author, notable for a series of works that combine reportage, memoir and elements of fictional style. Miller's books include The Tao of Muhammad Ali and The Tao of Bruce Lee: a martial arts memoir, as well as The Zen of Muhammad Ali: and other obsessions, a collection of personal essays, memoir and short fiction that was published exclusively in the U.K. His most recent book is Approaching Ali: A Reclamation in Three Acts.

== Career ==
Muhammad Ali was a childhood influence on Miller, and he was in college when first met Ali in 1975. He had a chance to spar with Ali at his training camp in Deer Lake, and he wrote of his experience in an article which was published in Sports Illustrated in 1981. Years later in 1988 when he was working in Louisville, Kentucky, he met Ali again at Ali's mother's house, he was invited for dinner with Ali and they became friends. He wrote a long article on their encounter titled "My Dinner with Ali", which was first published by Louisville Courier-Journal Magazine and then in a number of publications including Sport and Esquire magazines in 1989. This article won a number of awards, and was judged the best essay published in a U.S. newspaper magazine in 1989 by Sunday Magazine Editors Association.

Miller became the sportswriter on boxing for Sport magazine in 1989.

=== The Tao of Muhammad Ali ===
Miller's first book, The Tao of Muhammad Ali: a fathers and sons memoir, was published in hardcover in December 1996 by Warner Books and in trade paperback in January 1997 by Vintage U.K. The book has been an international bestseller, reaching number one in the UK, Australia and Japan, where it was published by Aoyama Publishing.

Miller wrote a radio play of The Tao of Muhammad Ali, which was broadcast in six parts in January 1998 by BBC Radio 4.

The Tao of Muhammad Ali was produced as an eight-episode immersive podcast series by Ron Howard and Brian Grazer's Imagine Entertainment & Television. The series, which is also titled The Tao of Muhammad Ali premiered on iHeartMedia in 2024.

=== Approaching Ali the chamber opera ===
An opera was developed from "The Tao of Muhammad Ali" and "My Dinner with Ali" for the Washington National Opera by composer D. J. Sparr. Along with Pulitzer Prize-winning librettist Mark Campbell, Davis Miller wrote the libretto for the opera, which received its world premiere in June 2013 at the John F. Kennedy Center for the Performing Arts. The opera has since received productions in various U.S. cities, including Raleigh, Las Vegas, Baton Rouge and Asheville. The title of the opera is Approaching Ali.

A book, titled Approaching Ali: A Reclamation in Three Acts, was also published in 2015.

== Personal life ==
Miller has four children.

== Bibliography ==
The following is a partial list of publications by Davis Miller:

=== Books ===
Approaching Ali: A Reclamation in Three Acts: W. W. Norton/Liveright, March 2016; Errata Naturae (Spain), September 2016.

The Zen of Muhammad Ali: and other obsessions: Vintage UK, January 2003.

The Tao of Bruce Lee: a martial arts memoir: Vintage UK, January 2000; Crown Publishing, August 2000.

The Tao of Muhammad Ali: a fathers and sons memoir: Warner Books, November 1996; Vintage, UK, February 1997; Aoyama Publishing (Japan), August 1998; Crown Publishing/Three Rivers Press, September 1999.

=== Anthologized stories ===
My Dinner with Ali: The Muhammad Ali Reader (Ecco Press, 1998); The Best American Sports Writing of the Century (Houghton Mifflin, 1999), The Beholder's Eye: America's Finest Personal Journalism (Grove/Atlantic, 2005).

The Zen of Muhammad Ali: The Best American Sports Writing, 1994 (Houghton Mifflin, 1994); GOAT: The Greatest of All Time, A Tribute to Muhammad Ali (Taschen, 2004).

=== Literary nonfiction for magazines, newspapers, radio and online publication ===
Five Last Rounds in Louisville: Approaching Ali, (Liveright/W. W. Norton, 2015); SBNation, October 2015.

Zen Cowboys: National Public Radio's All Things Considered, April 2007; Austin (Texas) American Statesman, October 8, 1999; Triad Style, October 5, 1999; Louisville Courier-Journal Saturday Magazine, October 2, 1999; Attache magazine, August 1998.

Dancing with Ali: Melbourne (Australia) Age, February 4, 2007; Los Angeles Times, Detroit News and National Public Radio's All Things Considered, January 17, 2007; Louisville Courier-Journal, (Oklahoma City) ''Oklahoman and Winston-Salem Journal, January 14, 2007.

The Best Father: Melbourne (Australia) Age, Raleigh News and Observer and (Oklahoma City) Oklahoman, June 17, 2007; San Antonio Express-News, June 18, 2006; Western Mail Saturday Magazine (Cardiff, Wales), June 17, 2006; Washington Post and Boston Globe Magazine, June 2003; Richmond Times-Dispatch and Winston-Salem Journal, June 2002; Candis magazine, May 1998.

My Dinner with Ali: Deadspin, June 2013; The Beholder's Eye: America's Finest Personal Journalism (Grove/Atlantic, 2005); The Best American Sports Writing of the Century (Houghton Mifflin, 1999); The Muhammad Ali Reader (Ecco Press,1998); Winston-Salem Journal and Detroit Free Press Magazine, June 1990; Sport magazine, May 1989; Louisville Courier-Journal Sunday Magazine, January 8, 1989.

The Zen of Muhammad Ali: GOAT: The Greatest of All Time, A Tribute to Muhammad Ali (Taschen, 2004); The Best American Sports Writing 1994 (Houghton Mifflin); Penthouse (South Africa), July 1994; Playboy (Japan and Germany), March 1994; cover story in 1994 and late 1993 for newspaper magazines published by the Miami Herald, Chicago Tribune, Louisville Courier-Journal, Pittsburgh Post-Gazette, Cleveland Plain Dealer, Independent on Sunday, Melbourne (Australia) Age, Detroit Free Press, Dallas Morning News, Buffalo News, (New York) Newsday, and Denver Post; and as a cover piece for features sections of numerous newspapers, including the Washington Post, Houston Chronicle, Seattle Times, Winston-Salem Journal, Toledo Blade, South Ireland Independent, Sydney (Australia) Morning Herald, Grand Rapids Press, Indianapolis Star, and Folha de S.Paulo (Brazil); Esquire, September 1992.

Bruce Lee, American: Honolulu Advertiser, August 7, 2003; AMCTV.com, July 2002; Richmond Times Dispatch, June 30, 2002; Hotdog magazine, April 2001; (London) Independent on Sunday Review, December 5, 1999; Winston-Salem Journal, November 17, 1998; Arena, October 1998; M Quarterly (Japan), October 1997; Panorama (Australia), July 1997; Men's Journal, February 1997; Esquire, September 1993.

Wanting to Whup Sugar Ray: a notable sports story, The Best American Sports Writing, 1992 (Houghton Mifflin, 1992); Sport magazine, March 1991; Washington Post Magazine, February 2, 1991.

Rapture: Sport magazine, July 1989.
