= The Tao of Muhammad Ali =

1997 book by Davis Miller

The Tao of Muhammad Ali is a 1997 book by the American author Davis Miller. The autobiographical account is notable for its blending of fact with some elements of narrative fiction.

The story covered concerns Miller's adolescence, idolising of Muhammad Ali, and subsequent discovery of martial arts. During this period, Miller befriends Ali and observes him closely. The book follows a number of themes, such as reality vs. illusion, integrity vs. falseness and the nature of achievement.

The Tao of Muhammad Ali was developed by composer D. J. Sparr for the Washington National Opera's American Opera Initiative. In collaboration with Pulitzer Prize–winning librettist Mark Campbell, Davis Miller wrote the libretto. The opera, titled Approaching Ali, received its world premiere in June 2013 at the John F. Kennedy Center for the Performing Arts in Washington, DC. As of 2026, the North Carolina Opera, Opera Las Vegas, Opera Louisiane and the Asheville Lyric Opera have also produced performances.
