= Daniel Sonenberg =

American classical composer

Daniel Sonenberg (born 1970) is an American composer and performer.

Sonenberg was born in Manhattan, New York in 1970, and moved to Maine in 2004. As a composer, he is best known for his opera The Summer King. His work Baseball Songs won the Robert Starer Competition Prize. He composed First Light: A Fanfare for Maine for performance by the Portland Symphony Orchestra at the Maine bicentennial celebrations.

Sonenberg is a member of a rock band, Lovers of Fiction, and has also released a solo album, Peaks Island Ferry. He is a professor at the University of Southern Maine.
