= Conrad Cummings =

American composer

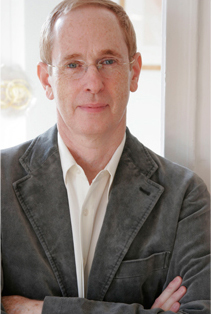
Conrad Cummings

Conrad Cummings (born February 10, 1948) is an American composer of contemporary classical music. His compositions include works for orchestra, as well as operatic and chamber works. Many of his works are composed in a minimalist style reminiscent of that of Philip Glass.

Cummings was born in San Francisco, California, United States. He studied at Yale University, State University of New York at Stony Brook, and Columbia University, from which he received a doctorate. His teachers include Bülent Arel, Mario Davidovsky, and Jacob Druckman. He later conducted post-doctoral research at IRCAM in Paris under Pierre Boulez. He is a former professor at the Oberlin Conservatory of Music.

Cummings lives in New York City, where he serves on the faculty of The Juilliard School, teaching composition in the Evening Division.

Four recordings of his music have been released on CRI's Emergency Music label.

The Golden Gate, an opera in two acts with music by Conrad Cummings and libretto from the novel-in-verse by Vikram Seth, adapted by the composer, is currently (2010) in development by LivelyWorks and American Opera Projects and receives a staged workshop production at the Rose Studio at Lincoln Center in New York City in January 2010.

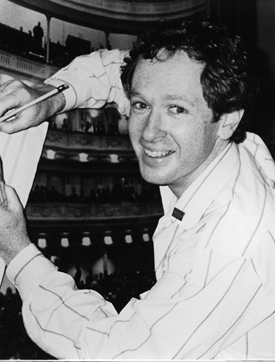
Cummings writing a piece, at a young age.

== Degrees and Studies ==
B.A., Yale U.; M.A., SUNY-Stony Brook; D.M.A., Columbia U. Composition studies with Bulent Arel, Mario Davidovsky, and Jacob Druckman. Postdoctoral research at IRCAM (Paris).

Accomplishments

Vice president of Hyperspace Cowgirls, a children's interactive media company, 1995–2002. Awards and fellowships: N.E.A., Opera America, Rockefeller Foundation, MacDowell Colony, and Djerassi Foundation. Works performed by Brooklyn Philharmonic, New Jersey Symphony, Louisville Orchestra, Indianapolis Symphony, Columbus and Cleveland Chamber Orchestras, Canadian Brass. Recordings on CRI Emergency Music label. Operas: Eros and Psyche (libretto by the composer), Oberlin Opera Theater; Photo-Op (libretto by James Siena), La MaMa ETC, N.Y.C., and UrbanArias, Washington D.C.; Tonkin (libretto by the composer with Tom Bird and Robert T. Jones), Opera Delaware; Positions 1956 (libretto by Michael Korie), PS 122 and Le Poisson Rouge, N.Y.C., Urban Arias, Washington D.C.; The Golden Gate (libretto from the novel in verse by Vikram Seth, adapted by the composer), staged workshop, Rose Studio at Lincoln Center, Opera America New Works Forum Showcase, November 2012, named one of the best operas of the 21st century by Opera News. Associate professor and director of Oberlin Conservatory's music and media program, 1980–1992.

Conrad Cummings has been mentioned in multiple different NY times articles reviewing his music that he composed. Four recordings of his music have been released on CRI's Emergency Music label.
