= John Musto =

American classical composer

John Musto (born 1954) is an American composer and pianist. As a composer, he is active in opera, orchestral and chamber music, song, vocal ensemble, and solo piano works. As a pianist, he performs frequently as a soloist, alone and with orchestra, as a chamber musician, and with singers.

== Career ==
Born in 1954 in Brooklyn, New York, Musto studied at the Manhattan School of Music. After graduation from the conservatory with a reputation as a pianist, his compositions began to draw increasing attention and frequent performances. His long association with such institutions as the New York Festival of Song, the Wolf Trap Opera Company, the Caramoor Festival, Copland House, the Miller Theatre at Columbia University, and the Moab Festival have given him stable bases of operation and numerous commissions.

He served as composer-in-residence at Caramoor for the 2005-2006 season.

In 1986, he began to build a catalogue of published compositions at Peermusic Classical, which continues to grow steadily.

== Personal ==
In 1984 John Musto married the soprano Amy Burton, a member of the New York City and Metropolitan Opera companies. He often appears with her as pianist in recital, cabaret and on recordings. Their son Joshua was born in 1994.

== Worklist ==
=== Orchestra ===
- Overture to Pope Joan (1998) full orchestra
- Passacaglia (2003) large orchestra
- Sinfonietta (2015) chamber orchestra

=== Piano and orchestra ===
- Piano Concerto 1 (2005) piano solo with full orchestra; premiered at Caramoor with the composer at the piano
- Piano Concerto 2 (2005) piano solo with chamber orchestra; premiered at Columbia University with the composer at the piano

=== Voice and orchestra ===
- Encounters (1992) tenor and full orchestra
- Dove Sta Amore (1996) soprano and chamber orchestra
- Quiet Songs (orchestrated 2009) soprano and chamber orchestra

=== Opera ===
- Volpone (2004) comic opera in two acts with a libretto by Mark Campbell, commissioned by Wolf Trap
- Later the Same Evening (2007) opera in one act with a libretto by Mark Campbell; premiered at the Glimmerglass Festival, July 2011
- Bastianello (2008) comic opera in one act with a libretto by Mark Campbell
- The Inspector (2011), comic opera with a libretto by Mark Campbell based on Gogol

=== Chamber music ===
- Piano Trio (1998) violin, violoncello and piano
- Divertimento (1999) flute, clarinet, viola, violoncello, piano and percussion
- Clarinet Sextet (2001) clarinet, string quartet and piano
- Sonata for Violoncello and Piano (2019)
- Sonata for Clarinet and Piano (2020)
- Quintet for Piano and String Quartet (2022)
- Sonata for Violin and Piano (2023)

=== Piano solo ===
- Five Concert Rags (1991-8)
- Improvisation and Fugue (2008)

=== Two pianos ===
- Symphonic Dances from "West Side Story" (arr. 1998)
- Passacaglia (arr. 2009)
- Johann Sebastian Bach: Prelude and Fugue (St. Anne)
- Wolfgang Amadeus Mozart: Overture to The Magic Flute

=== Vocal chamber music ===
- The Old Gray Couple (1994) soprano, baritone with piano four-hands
- The Book of Uncommon Prayer (2001) SATB with piano
- River Songs (2002) baritone, violoncello and piano
- Another Place (2016) Soprano and String Quartet

=== Choral ===
- Starsong (1997) SATB, harp and two horns
- Five Motets (2001) a capella mixed chorus
- Ah, May the Red Rose Live Alway (2016) [arrangement SATB]
- ...a silence that speaks (2017) a capella mixed chorus

=== Voice and piano ===
- Two by Frost (1986)
- Canzonettas (1984)
- Enough Rope (1985)
- Shadow of the Blues (1986)
- Recuerdo (1988)
- Quiet Songs (1990)
- Dove Sta Amore (1996)
- Penelope (2000)
- Viva Sweet Love (2005)
- The Brief Light (2010)
- Scottish Songs (2013)
- Another Place (2016)
- Be Music, Night (2017)

=== Single songs ===
- Triolet (1987)
- Lament (1988)
- Heartbeats (1992)
- Flamenco (2000)
- I Stop Writing the Poem (2001)
- Old Photograph (2001)
- San Jose Symphony Reception (2001)
- Words To Be Spoken (2001)
- Nude at the Piano (2003)
- Summer Stars (2012)
- Sarah's Song (2012)
- Nightsong (2018)
