= Laura Kaminsky =

American classical composer

Laura Kaminsky (born September 28, 1956) is an American composer, producer of musical and multi-disciplinary cultural events, and educator. She was born in New York City, graduated from the High School of Music and Art, and studied with Joseph Wood at Oberlin College and Mario Davidovsky at City College of New York. She graduated from City College/CUNY with a Master of Arts degree in composition in 1980.

== Career ==
Kaminsky has maintained an active composing studio and has had her music performed internationally. She is the recipient of numerous prestigious awards and fellowships. In addition, her music has been extensively recorded. She has received national recognition for her innovative cultural programming and has held posts at a number of important institutions including New York City's 92nd Street Y, Town Hall, and Symphony Space, where she is currently artistic director. In 1984 she co-founded and remains the artistic director of the new music collective, Musicians Accord, which is in residence at City College of New York, where the ensemble members work with Professor David Del Tredici and his graduate composition students.

From 1992-93 Kaminsky lived and worked in Ghana, where she taught at the National Academy of Music and produced a series of concerts, including a conference on African Music: Tradition and Innovation. From 1996-97 she served as director of the European Mozart Academy, an international post-graduate music fellowship program based in Poland that brought together talented young musicians from Western and Eastern Europe to study and perform in concerts across Eastern Europe in the aftermath of the dissolution of the Soviet Union. From 1999-2004 she served as chair of the music department at the Cornish College of the Arts in Seattle, and from 2004-08 was dean of the Conservatory of Music at Purchase College State University of New York when she left to assume the post of artistic director of New York City's multi-disciplinary performing arts center, Symphony Space, succeeding its founding director, Isaiah Sheffer. In addition, she continues to teach composition and arts management at Purchase College.

== Personal life ==
Kaminsky is the daughter of Dr. Leonard Kaminsky, a dentist, and Eva D. Kaminsky, who managed her husband's dental practice. Her mother is from London and her father is from The Bronx. In 2011, Kaminsky married painter Rebecca Allan.

== Works ==
Kaminsky has a large catalog of works, and composes mostly chamber and vocal music. Selected works include:

Operas:

- Some Light Emerges
- As One
- Hometown to the World
- Today It Rains
- The Post Office
- Time to Act

Orchestral:

- Terra Terribilis: Concerto for Three Percussionists and Orchestra
- Piano Concerto

String Quartets:

- Transformations
- Transformations II: Music for a Changing World
- Monotypes
- American Nocturne
- Cadmium Yellow

Chamber Music:

- Vukovar Trio
- Duo for Flute and Piano
- Duo for Cello and Piano
- Wave Hill for Violin and Piano
- And Trouble Came: An African AIDS Diary
- Twilight Settings
- Proverbs of Hell
- Whence it Comes
- Inerpolations on Utopia Parkway
- Piano Quintet

Solo Piano:

- Fantasy
- Music for Artur
- Calendar Music
- Triftmusik
- Danza Piccola

Piano Four-hands:

- "Reckoning" (5 Miniatures for America)

Other solo works:

- The Great Unconformity (cello)
- Isole (cello)
- Until a Name (flute)

Songs:

- Rise, My Love
- Whitman Songs
