= Monk in Pieces =

2025 American documentary film

- Festival release poster
- Directed by: Billy Shebar; David C. Roberts
- Written by: Billy Shebar; David C. Roberts
- Produced by: Billy Shebar; David C. Roberts; Susan Margolin
- Starring: Meredith Monk; Björk; David Byrne
- Cinematography: Jeff Hutchens; Ben Stechschulte
- Edited by: Sabine Krayenbühl
- Music by: Meredith Monk
- Animation by: Paul Barritt
- Production companies: 110th Street Films; ZDF / Arte
- Distributed by: Zeitgeist Films; Kino Lorber
- Release date: 18 February 2025 (Berlinale)
- Running time: 95 minutes
- Countries: United States; Germany; France
- Language: English
- Box office: $39,108

Monk in Pieces is a 2025 documentary film directed by Billy Shebar and co-written by Shebar and David C. Roberts. The film explores the life and work of composer and interdisciplinary artist Meredith Monk, charting her career from early critical resistance to later international recognition. Now in her seventh decade of creative work, Monk reflects on her artistic legacy and the future of her performance practice. The documentary includes interviews with artists such as David Byrne and Björk, who discuss Monk’s influence on their work.

The film premiered at the 75th Berlin International Film Festival on February 18, 2025, screening in the Panorama section. It was nominated for Best Documentary/Essay Film at the 39th Teddy Awards.

== Synopsis ==
The film posits that Meredith Monk – composer, performer, and interdisciplinary artist – is one of the great artistic pioneers of the modern era, yet her profound cultural influence is largely unrecognized. Monk in Pieces takes the form of a mosaic, mirroring the structure of Monk’s own work as it explores her vocabulary of sound and imagery.

As a female artist in the male-dominated downtown arts scene of the 1960s and ‘70s, Monk had to fight for recognition and resources. Many early reviews in the New York Times were unappreciative, some vicious: “A disgrace to the name of dancing,” wrote Clive Barnes, and “so earnestly strange in a talented little-girl way,” wrote John Rockwell. Yet as her celebrated contemporary, Philip Glass, says in an interview, "she, among all of us, was – and still is – the uniquely gifted one."

In the film's final chapters, Monk faces mortality and warily entrusts her opera, ATLAS, to opera director Yuval Sharon and singer Joanna Lynn-Jacobs for a new production at the Los Angeles Philharmonic. The ATLAS performance marks the first time in sixty years that Monk has not directed and performed in her own music theater works.

== Cast ==
- Meredith Monk
- Björk
- David Byrne
- Philip Glass
- Merce Cunningham
- Yuval Sharon
- Julia Wolfe
- Joanna Lynn-Jacobs
- Ping Chong
- John Schaefer

== Production ==
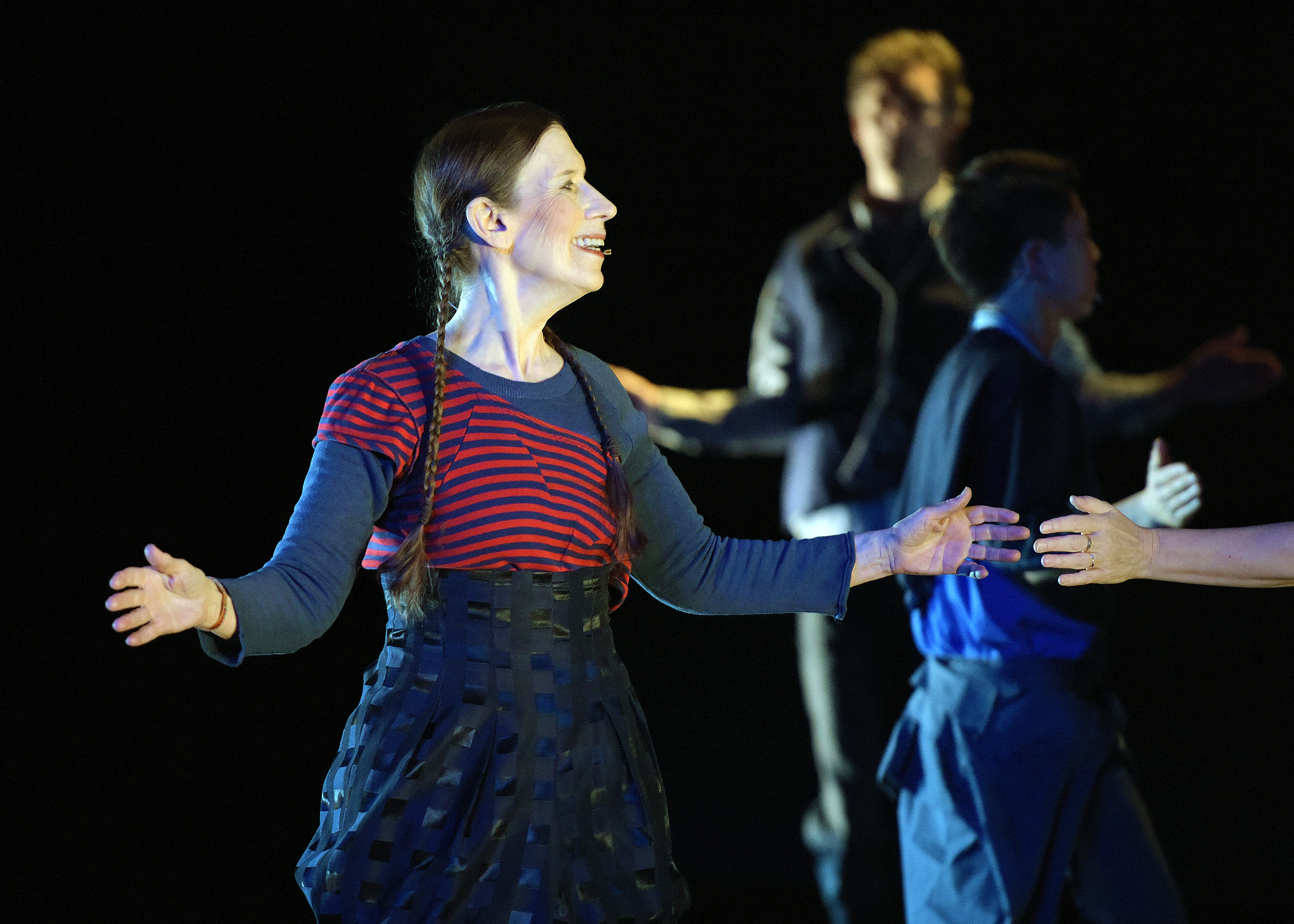
Meredith Monk - On Behalf of Nature - Brooklyn Academy of Music in 2014

The film grew out of director Billy Shebar’s 30-year relationship with Monk and her work. In 1990, Shebar’s wife, Katie Geissinger, joined the cast of Monk’s ATLAS, and has performed in all of Monk’s major works since then.

Shebar developed the film with his former producing partner David Roberts. Production was funded by a major grant from the National Endowment for the Humanities. Additional support was provided by the Steven Spielberg-backed Jewish Story Partners.

From 2021 to 2024, Shebar filmed interviews with Monk, David Byrne, Björk and others; rehearsals for Monk’s latest work, Indra’s Net; and scenes from her daily life in the Tribeca loft where she has lived and worked since 1972. During that time, he also explored Monk’s extensive archive at the New York Public Library for the Performing Arts as well as her private archive.

The development and making of the film, in Shebar's words:

Three years ago, Monk opened the doors of the Tribeca loft where she’s been working since 1972 to me and my film crew, allowing us to capture the rhythms of her daily life and the creation of her newest work, Indra’s Net. She also granted me access to a rich archive of film, photos, notebooks, and recordings, affording deep insights into her evolution as an artist. Rather than attempting a comprehensive biopic, I’ve created a mosaic mirroring the structure of Monk’s own work. Each chapter is anchored by a single Monk song and offers a unique window on her life’s work.

== Release ==
Monk in Pieces had its world premiere at the 75th Berlin International Film Festival on February 18, 2025 in the Panorama Section. It was nominated for Best Documentary/Essay Film at the 39th Teddy Awards.

The film had its international premiere at the Thessaloniki Documentary Festival in March 2025 in the Open Horizons section, and has since screened at international festivals including the 49th Hong Kong International Film Festival, IndieLisboa, Melbourne International Film Festival, and Doc'n Roll Festival in London, where it won the Jury Award for Documentary of the Year 2025. Monk in Pieces premiered in North America at Seattle International Film Festival, and also screened at DC/DOX and DOC NYC.

In June 2025, Zeitgeist Films and Kino Lorber acquired distribution rights to the film. Zeitgeist Films released Monk in Pieces in theaters in over 30 cities, beginning with the IFC Center in New York City on July 25, 2025 with Meredith Monk in person. Kino Lorber released the film digitally and on DVD and Blu-ray in the fall of 2025.

== Reception ==
Reviews of the film were generally positive. Stephen Dalton, writing in The Film Verdict, called it “an engaging, relatable, very human story about an uncompromising female artist battling to keep her unique vision alive.” Filmmaker Magazine’s Lauren Wissot wrote that the film “deftly reflects Monk’s own approach to her iconoclastic art, forcing us to listen with a different ear, to look closer not away.”

Writing in Kino-Zeit, Andreas Köhnemann observed: “The scenes in which Björk describes her intense feelings and amazement are among the numerous beautiful moments of Monk in Pieces.” Amber Wilkinson of Screen Daily described the film as a “rich tapestry of Monk’s music… soaring vocalisations that swoop and loop across her three-octave range.”

The Moveable Fest’s Stephen Saito called it “the best celebration that could be offered for an artist who found so much in her own voice.”

Writing for IndieWire, David Ehrlich said "It can be hard to pinpoint why, or even how, Billy Shebar’s Monk in Pieces is so much better and more involving than the average documentary about the life of an artist…. [The film] transcends its format because it’s less the story of an artist than it is the story of artistry itself — of what it does, of why we need it, and of how it survives in the face of a world that loves discovery almost as much as it hates anything it hasn’t already heard or seen before."

Deadline Hollywood featured the film in its “For the Love of Docs” series of virtual screenings, writing that it “captures [Monk's] astonishing range of gifts.”

Hyperallergic named Monk in Pieces one the “10 Best Art Films of 2025,” calling it "a vibrant mosaic of her life and work that both honors her prolific output and celebrates her singular vision.”

== Accolades ==
Award	Date	Category	Recipient	Result	Ref.
Berlin International Film Festival	23 February 2025	Panorama Audience Award for Best Feature Film	Billy Shebar	Nominated	
Berlin International Film Festival	23 February 2025	Teddy Award for Best Documentary/Essay Film	Billy Shebar	Nominated	
IndieLisboa International Independent Film Festival	10 May 2025	Indiemusic Schweppes Award	Billy Shebar	Nominated	
DocsBarcelona	17 May 2025	DocsBarcelona TV3 Award for Best Documentary	Billy Shebar	Nominated	
Krakow Film Festival	1 June 2025	Golden Heynal Award for International DocFilmMusic Competition	Billy Shebar	Nominated	
Doc'n Roll Festival	11 November 2025	Jury Award for Documentary of the Year	Billy Shebar	Won	
Cinema Eye Honors	8 January 2026	Outstanding Debut	Billy Shebar and David C. Roberts	Nominated	
