= Sweetland =

Sweetland may refer to:

- Sweetland (film), 2023 Canadian film
- Sweetland (surname)
- Sweetland, California, United States
- Sweetland, Nova Scotia, Canada

== See also ==
- Sweet Land, 2005 American film
- Sweet Land (opera)
- Sweetland Farmhouse, Cazenovia, New York
