= Yuval Sharon =

American opera and theater director (born 1979)

- Born: 1979 (age 46–47); Naperville, Illinois, United States
- Education: University of California, Berkeley
- Occupations: Theatre director; Artistic director
- Organization: The Industry
- Website: www.yuvalsharon.com

Yuval Sharon is an American opera and theater director from Naperville, Illinois, based in Los Angeles. He is the founder and co-artistic director of The Industry Opera. In 2020, he became the Gary L. Wasserman Artistic Director of Detroit Opera,, but at the end of 2025 he announced his early departure from the position after budget cuts led the company to cancel plans for new productions.

== Early life and education ==
Sharon was born in 1979 in Chicago to two Israeli parents. He earned a B.A. in 2001 from the University of California, Berkeley studying English and dramatic arts, before spending a year in Berlin. Seeing Anthony Davis's Amistad and Meredith Monk's Atlas as a college student and his time in Berlin led him towards opera.

Sharon then lived in New York, where he founded a theater company called Theater Faction and worked at the New York City Opera, directing its VOX program from 2006 to 2009, before moving to Los Angeles. He found Los Angeles to be the ideal home for experimental work in opera and founded The Industry to put on innovative productions.

== Career ==
Sharon serves as co-artistic director of The Industry in Los Angeles, alongside Ash Fure and Malik Gaines. Notable productions include Hopscotch, an opera staged in 24 moving vehicles; a performance installation of Terry Riley's In C at the Hammer Museum; Christopher Cerrone's Invisible Cities, based on the Italo Calvino novel and staged in Los Angeles Union Station, Anne LeBaron's Crescent City, set in a mythical town loosely based on New Orleans, Sweet Land, an opera about colonialism and history created in collaboration with Cannupa Hanska Luger, Aja Couchois Duncan, Raven Chacon, Du Yun, and Douglas Kearney; and The Comet/Poppea, a double-feature consisting of L'incoronazione di Poppea and an operatic adaptation of W. E. B. Du Bois's short story "The Comet", presented simultaneously on a rotating stage.

From 2017–2019, Sharon was the first-ever artist-collaborator at the Los Angeles Philharmonic, where his projects included an original setting of Orson Welles's The War of the Worlds with music by Annie Gosfield, performed both inside and outside Walt Disney Concert Hall simultaneously; the installation Nimbus; a new performance edition of Lou Harrison's Young Caesar; a staging of Mahler's Das Lied von der Erde with Gustavo Dudamel in Spring 2018; and productions of John Cage's Europeras 1&2 and Meredith Monk's Atlas, for which Sharon became the first-ever outside producer of one of the composer's works.

On September 9, 2020, Yuval Sharon was named the Gary L. Wasserman Artistic Director for the Michigan Opera Theater (as of February 2022 renamed to Detroit Opera). He made his house debut as director that October with Twilight: Gods, an abridged adaptation of Götterdämmerung presented in the Detroit Opera House Parking Center and, with Lyric Opera of Chicago, the Millennium Lakeside Parking Garage. Other Detroit Opera productions have included Ragnar Kjartansson's Bliss—a 12-hour loop of The Marriage of Figaro, which Sharon presented in the Michigan Building's former theater space; a reverse-chronology production of La bohème, staged in Detroit, Boston, Philadelphia, and Spoleto Festival USA; The Valkyries, a staging of act 3 of Die Walküre which he premiered with Gustavo Dudamel and the Los Angeles Philharmonic at the Hollywood Bowl; and John Cage's Europeras 3&4, staged in the Gem Theatre.

Other projects include a 2012 production of John Cage's Song Books at the San Francisco Symphony and Carnegie Hall with Joan La Barbara, Meredith Monk, and Jessye Norman; a 2014 production of John Adams's Doctor Atomic, for which he was awarded a Götz Friedrich Prize; Péter Eötvös's Tri sestry (Three Sisters) at the Vienna State Opera in 2016; a 2016 production of Die Walküre at Badisches Staatstheater Karlsruhe; productions of Pelléas et Mélisande and The Cunning Little Vixen with the Cleveland Orchestra, the latter of which became the first fully staged opera ever presented in Vienna's historic Musikverein in October 2017; and a 2018 production of Olga Neuwirth's Lost Highway at Oper Frankfurt.

Sharon became the first American director at the Bayreuth Festival with a 2018 production of Lohengrin. In 2019, Sharon premiered a new production of The Magic Flute at the Berlin State Opera. In 2022, Sharon led the premiere production of Proximity, a trio of new operas commissioned by Lyric Opera of Chicago comprising The Walkers by Daniel Bernard Roumain and Anna Deavere Smith, Four Portraits by Caroline Shaw and Jocelyn Clarke; and Night, composed by John Luther Adams with text by the late John Haines. He made his Santa Fe Opera house debut in 2023 with Monteverdi's Orfeo, appearing in a new orchestration by Nico Muhly.

In 2024, the Metropolitan Opera announced that Sharon would direct its next Ring cycle, beginning in the 2027–28 season. His first production at the Met, Tristan und Isolde, opened in March 2026 and was called "the event of the season" by New York Times critic Joshua Barone.

== Personal life ==
Sharon's partner is theatrical producer Jeffrey Seller.

== Awards ==
- 2014 Götz Friedrich Prize in Germany for his production of John Adams's Doctor Atomic
- 2017 Foundation for Contemporary Arts Grants to Artists award
- 2017 MacArthur Fellowship
- 2023 Musical America Director of the Year
