= Robert Een =

American composer, cellist, and vocalist

Robert Een (born 1952) is an American composer, cellist, and vocalist.

== Career ==
Known for his use of extended vocal and cello techniques, Een has recorded eight albums of his compositions and scored several films. He received Bessie Awards for music composition in 1998 and for sustained achievement in 2000. He won an Obie Award in 2004 for his score to Dan Hurlin's puppet theatre work Hiroshima Maiden. His music for dance and theater can be heard in the repertories of Liz Lerman, David Dorfman, Jennifer Muller, Brian Selznick, and Yin Mei, among others. He teaches voice and composition in UCLA's Department of World Arts and Cultures/Dance.

=== Performance ===
Robert Een [was] a longtime member of my Vocal Ensemble and [is] an extraordinary singer and musician in his own right. I had had the pleasure of singing with him for many years but never in the context of a duet [until Facing North]. From the time I first met him in 1977, I was moved by the bell-like clarity of his musical understanding and the beauty and honesty of his singing and playing.

— Meredith Monk

Een's band, Big Joe, includes the film composer Carter Burwell, and his long association with Meredith Monk, including his performance in the 1991 premier of Monk's Atlas, culminated in the creation of their hour-long music/theater duet, Facing North (1992). He also performed with Julius Eastman in Monk's ensemble and studied composition with him. He has performed his music throughout the world, including Buddhist caves in India, a theater above the arctic circle in Norway, a Shinto shrine in Japan, as well as Lincoln Center and the Knitting Factory in New York City. He performed his opera The Escape Artist at the 2008 World Festival of Sacred Music in Los Angeles with the International Mystical All-Star Band.

== Discography ==
- Music from Blue Earth (1989) w/ Dale Newton
- Big Joe (1995)
- Your Life Is Not Your Own (Buzzbox, 1998)
- The Saga (2000)
- Robert Een: Mystery Dances (Starkland, 2003)
- Fertile Fields (Buzzbox, 2003)
- Expanding Universe (Buzzbox, 2004)
- Hiroshima Maiden (Innova, 2008)
- The Mystery of You (2012)
- Subtle Electric Fire (2013)

With Meredith Monk

- Dolmen Music (ECM New Series, 1981)
- Turtle Dreams (ECM New Series, 1983)
- Do You Be (ECM New Series, 1987)
- Book of Days (ECM New Series, 1990)
- Facing North (ECM New Series, 1992)
- Atlas: An Opera in Three Parts (ECM New Series, 1993)

== Soundtracks ==
- The Rook (1994)
- Misty Isle Out (1997)
- Mr. Jealousy (1997)
- Trouble on the Corner (1997)
- Case Studies from the Groat Center for Sleep Disorders (2002)
