= Do You Be =

Studio album by Meredith Monk
- Released: 1987
- Recorded: June 1986; January 1987
- Genre: Modern classical, minimalism
- Length: 43:54
- Label: ECM New Series 1336
- Producer: Manfred Eicher

Meredith Monk chronology
Turtle Dreams (1983)	Do You Be (1987)	Book of Days (1990)

Professional ratings
Review scores
Source	Rating
AllMusic	3/5 stars

Do You Be is the sixth album by Meredith Monk, recorded over two sessions in June 1986 and January 1987 and released on the ECM New Series later in 1987.

== Background ==
The liner notes state, "This album was made possible in part by a grant from the National Endowment for the Arts."

== Track listing ==
All tracks are written by Meredith Monk.

No.	Title	Length
1.	"Scared Song"	6:04
2.	"I Don't Know"	3:31
3.	"Window in 7's"	2:12
4.	"Double Fiesta"	5:21
5.	"Do You Be"	4:02
6.	"Panda Chant I"	1:56
7.	"Memory Song"	6:40
8.	"Panda Chant II"	1:35
9.	"Quarry Lullaby"	2:00
10.	"Shadow Song"	1:57
11.	"Astronaut Anthem"	4:56
12.	"Wheel"	3:40

=== Notes ===
- tracks 1–4 from "Acts from Under and Above", a music/theatre piece by Meredith Monk and Lanny Harrison.
- track 5 from "Vessel: An Opera Epic" by Meredith Monk.
- tracks 6–8 & 10–12 from "The Games", a science fiction opera by Meredith Monk and Ping Chong.
- track 9 from "Quarry", an opera by Meredith Monk.

== Personnel ==
=== June 1986 at Tonstudio Bauer, Ludwigsburg (tracks 1, 2, 5–10 & 12) ===
- Meredith Monk – vocals, piano (2, 5), synthesizer (1)
- Robert Een – vocals (6, 8, 9)
- Andrea Goodman – vocals (6–9, 12)
- Ching Gonzalez – vocals (8, 9)
- Wayne Hankin – vocals (6, 8, 9), keyboards (7), bagpipes (12)
- Naaz Hosseini – vocals (6–9, 12), violin (7)
- Nurit Tilles – piano (1), keyboards (7), synthesizer (12), vocals (8, 9)

=== January 1987 at Clinton Sounds, New York (tracks 3, 4 & 11) ===
- Meredith Monk – vocals, piano (11)
- Johanna Arnold, Robert Een, John Eppler, Andrea Goodman, Ching Gonzalez, Wayne Hankin, Naaz Hosseini, Nicky Paraiso – vocals (11)
- Edmund Niemann – piano (4)
- Nurit Tilles – piano (3, 4)

=== Technical personnel ===
- Manfred Eicher – production
- Martin Wieland – recording (June 1986), mixing
  - mixed at Tonstudio Bauer
- James Farber – recording (January 1987)
- Barbara Wojirsch – design
- Yoshio Yabara – design
- JoAnn Verburg – photography
