= Hopscotch (disambiguation) =

Hopscotch is a children's game.

Hopscotch may also refer to:

== Fiction ==
- Hopscotch (Cortázar novel), a 1963 novel by Julio Cortázar
- Hopscotch (Garfield novel), a 1975 novel by Brian Garfield
  - Hopscotch (film), a 1980 adaptation of Garfield's novel
- Hopscotch, a 2002 novel by Kevin J. Anderson

== Music ==
- Hopscotch (opera), a 2015 experimental opera
- Hopscotch Music Festival, an annual event in Raleigh, North Carolina, US
- Hopscotch Records, a record label co-founded by Assif Tsahar
- Hopscotch, an album, or the title song, by Mothfight, 2007
- "Hopscotch" (Emmelie de Forest song), 2015
- "Hopscotch", a song by 88rising from Head in the Clouds II, 2019
- "Hopscotch", a song by Tinashe from Songs for You, 2019
- "Hop Scotch", a song by Ron Contour and Factor Chandelier from Saffron, 2010

== Other uses ==
- Hopscotch (card game) or Calculation, a solitaire card game
- Hopscotch (programming language), a visual programming language
- Hopscotch, an Australian film distribution company acquired by Entertainment One

== See also ==
- Hopscotch hashing, in computer programming
- Hopscotch pattern or Pythagorean tiling, a floor tile layout
