= Abigail Fischer =

American mezzo-soprano

- Born: Norwich, Vermont, United States
- Occupation: singer

Abigail Fischer is an American mezzo-soprano.

Fischer is known for her commitment to contemporary music, having premiered works by composers Missy Mazzoli, John Zorn, Nico Muhly and Elliot Carter.

She performed the role of Mrs. X.E. in the world premiere of Angel's Bone, winner of the 2017 Pulitzer Prize for Music, by composer Du Yun and librettist Royce Vavrek.

== Notable world premieres ==
- 2016 Angel's Bone (Du Yun and Royce Vavrek)
- 2015 The Scarlet Ibis (Stefan Weisman and David Cote)
- 2012 Song from the Uproar: The Lives and Deaths of Isabelle Eberhardt (Missy Mazzoli and Royce Vavrek)
- 2012 The Elements of Style (Nico Muhly)

== Critical reception ==
"...Abigail Fischer, whose throbbing low register and open-hearted performing style reminded me of Lorraine Hunt Lieberson." Heidi Waleson, The Wall Street Journal

"After years of growing up in public, Missy Mazzoli's dreamlike opera lived up to great expectations and made a star of Abigail Fischer." Steve Smith, Time Out New York
