= Turtle Dreams =

Studio album by Meredith Monk
- Released: 1983
- Recorded: 1983
- Genre: Contemporary classical music
- Length: 37:24
- Label: ECM New Series; ECM 1240
- Producer: Collin Walcott; Manfred Eicher

Meredith Monk chronology
Dolmen Music (1981)	Turtle Dreams (1983)	Do You Be (1987)

Turtle Dreams is an album by American composer and vocalist Meredith Monk recorded in 1983 and released on the ECM New Series later that year. A choreographed version of the work premiered at the Plexus Club in Chelsea, Manhattan. A film version, directed by Ping Chong, was broadcast the same year on September 2 on WGBH in Boston, Massachusetts.

== Background ==
In the late 1970s Monk acquired a turtle named Neutron as a pet. Monk commented in a 2016 New York Times interview, "When I first got her I had a lot of dreams about her, very strange dreams. And then I started thinking, how does a turtle think? What would a turtle mind be, and if she's sleeping, what would a turtle dream be?"

In a 2010 interview, Monk said she found standard music concerts boring, and said "at that time I started to try to feed in elements to that situation—like one little element of movement. Turtle Dreams is a music piece that has a very simplified movement component. I was working on that music myself, and then I thought 'wouldn't it be interesting if the movement had a totally simple counterpoint? So instead of standing there singing, what about if we went from side to side?' And from there, the piece seemed to make itself." She also added, "When I was working on it I didn't realise some things that I see now. There's a certain fascist element to it, and I wasn't conscious of that at the time.... There's a flatness, a surface style to the people, and maybe a kind of narcissism too."

The film version of the piece includes footage of turtles, initially in natural settings and then walking across a world map and through a miniature model of a Western city. This footage was photographed and directed by filmmaker Robert Withers.

== Reception ==
AllMusic awarded the album four stars, with Ted Mills calling it "A daring display of vocal gymnastics and a journey back to childhood when all sounds were wondrous."

After its premier, John Rockwell of The New York Times wrote, "The effect is rich, enigmatic and compelling."

Writing for Afterall, Isla Leaver-Yap suggested that Turtle Dreams is "one of Monk's most aggressive and direct works" and comments, "The proximity of players to audience, and the blank stare that they deliver, push Turtle Dreams into a place of intimate hostility, where the emotional charge does not derive from the content but from the format and tone in the work."

== Track listing ==
All tracks are written by Meredith Monk.

Side I
No.	Title	Length
1.	"Turtle Dreams (Waltz)"	17:52

Side II
No.	Title	Length
1.	"View 1"	10:13
2.	"Engine Steps"	2:03
3.	"Ester's Song"	1:14
4.	"View 2"	6:02

- Recorded in New York City (tracks 1 & 2), at Hanford Mills Museum, East Meredith in New York (track 3), and at Tonstudio Bauer in Ludwigsburg, West Germany (track 4 & 5)

== Personnel ==
- Meredith Monk – voice, piano (side II), Minimoog (side II), Casio (side II), organ (side I)
- Collin Walcott – didgeridoo (side II), organ (side II)

=== Additional musicians ===
- Julius Eastman, Steve Lockwood – organ (side I)
- Andrea Goodman, Paul Langland, Robert Een – voice (side I)

=== Technical personnel ===
- Collin Walcott, Manfred Eicher – producer
- Martin Wieland – mixing engineer
- Barbara Wojirsch – cover design
- Yoshia Yabara – costume design
- Sarah Ouwerkerk – photography
