= The Industry Opera =

Los Angeles-based opera company

The Industry Opera is a Los Angeles-based opera company that creates experimental productions. Founded in 2010 by Artistic Director Yuval Sharon, The Industry has created site-specific projects across Los Angeles.

The industry's projects include world premiere productions with composers Raven Chacon, Du Yun, Rand Steiger, Veronika Krausas, Marc Lowenstein, Andrew McIntosh, Andrew Norman, Ellen Reid, David Rosenboom, Christopher Cerrone, and Anne LeBaron, and new productions of works by John Cage, Lou Harrison, and Terry Riley through the company's Highway One series.

== Opera projects produced by The Industry ==
- Crescent City (2010, Anne LaBaron, composer; Douglas Kearney, librettist; Yuval Sharon, director; Marc Lowenstein, conductor)
- Invisible Cities (2013, Christopher Cerrone, composer & librettist; based on the novel Invisible Cities by Italo Calvino; Yuval Sharon, director; Marc Lowenstein, conductor)
- IN C (performance installation, co-produced by the Hammer Museum)
- Hopscotch (2015), Veronika Krausas, Marc Lowenstein, Andrew McIntosh, Andrew Norman, Ellen Reid, David Rosenboom, composers; Tom Jacobson, Mandy Kahn, Sarah LaBrie, Jane Stephens Rosenthal, Janine Salinas Schoenberg, Erin Young, librettists; Yuval Sharon, director)
- Nimbus (performance installation, co-produced by LA Philharmonic) (2017, Rand Steiger, composer & sound designer)
- Young Caesar (co-produced by LA Philharmonic) (2017, Lou Harrison, composer; Robert Gordon, librettist; new performance edition created by Yuval Sharon and Marc Lowenstein; Yuval Sharon, director; Marc Lowenstein, conductor)
- War of the Worlds (co-produced by LA Philharmonic) (2017, Annie Gosfield, composer; Yuval Sharon, libretto and direction; Christopher Rountree, conductor)
- Europeras (co-produced by LA Philharmonic) (2018, John Cage, creator; Yuval Sharon, director)
- Sweet Land (2020, Du Yun, Raven Chacon, composers; Aja Couchois Duncan, Douglas Kearney, librettists; Cannupa Hanska Luger, Yuval Sharon, directors; Marc Lowenstein, Jenny Wong, conductors)
