= Songs of Ascension =

Studio album by Meredith Monk
- Released: May 13, 2011
- Recorded: November 2009 at Academy of Arts and Letters, New York.
- Genre: Minimalism
- Length: 67:27
- Label: ECM New Series
- Producer: Manfred Eicher

Meredith Monk chronology
| Beginnings (2009) | Songs of Ascension (2011) | Piano Songs (2014) |

Professional ratings
Review scores
| Source | Rating |
|---|---|
| AllMusic | 5/5 stars |

Songs of Ascension is an album by Meredith Monk. It was released on May 13, 2011, by ECM New Series. It was recorded at the BAM Harvey Theater, in New York, in 2009.

It peaked at No. 8 on Billboard's Traditional Classical Albums chart.

== Critical reception ==
The Washington Post called the recording "radiant," writing that "although simple in its means, it is unusually rich, for Monk, in its timbres and textures." The Independent wrote that "it's an innovative, provocative but enjoyable work, exploring the relations between voices and instruments ... Tremendous stuff."

== Track listing ==
All tracks are written by Meredith Monk, except "Vow" co-written with Mieke van Hoek and "Clusters 3" co-written with Bohdan Hilash.

| No. | Title | Length |
|---|---|---|
| 1. | "Clusters 1" | 3:17 |
| 2. | "Strand (Gathering)" | 1:55 |
| 3. | "Winter Variation" | 1:51 |
| 4. | "Cloud Code" | 3:31 |
| 5. | "Shift" | 1:51 |
| 6. | "Mapping" | 2:07 |
| 7. | "Summer Variation" | 3:16 |
| 8. | "Vow" | 3:12 |
| 9. | "Clusters 2" | 2:27 |
| 10. | "Falling" | 2:54 |
| 11. | "Burn" | 4:16 |
| 12. | "Strand (Inner Psalm)" | 3:12 |
| 13. | "Autumn Variation" | 2:48 |
| 14. | "Ledge Dance" | 1:50 |
| 15. | "Traces" | 1:20 |
| 16. | "Respite" | 5:56 |
| 17. | "Mapping Continued" | 1:29 |
| 18. | "Clusters 3" | 2:09 |
| 19. | "Spring Variation" | 4:03 |
| 20. | "Fathom" | 4:37 |
| 21. | "Ascent" | 9:26 |

== Personnel ==
Musicians

- Sasha Bogdanowitsch – vocals
- Heather J. Buchanan – conductor
- Sidney Chen – vocals
- Emily Eagen – vocals
- Ellen Fisher – shruti box, vocals
- Katie Geissinger – shruti box, vocals
- Ching Gonzalez – shruti box, vocals
- Bohdan Hilash – alto saxophone, bass clarinet, khene, shruti Box
- John Hollenbeck – percussion, shruti box, vocals
- Ha-Yang Kim – cello, vocals
- Meredith Monk – shruti box, vocals, mixing
- Holly Nadal – vocals
- Toby Newman – vocals
- Courtney Orlando – violin, vocals
- Bruce Rameker – shruti box, vocals
- Todd Reynolds – violin
- Peter Sciscioli – vocals
- Nadia Sirota – viola, vocals
- Allison Sniffin – shruti box, vocals

Production

- Manfred Eicher – production, mixing
- James A. Farber – engineering, mixing
- Marion Gray – photography
- Sascha Kleis – design
- Paul Zinman – engineering
