= Dolmen Music =

Studio album by Meredith Monk
- Released: 1981
- Recorded: March 1980; January 1981
- Studios: Hometown, New York City; Tonstudio Bauer, Ludwigsburg
- Genre: Contemporary classical music
- Length: 46:20
- Label: ECM New Series 1197
- Producers: Collin Walcott, Manfred Eicher

Meredith Monk chronology
Songs from the Hill/Tablet (1979)	Dolmen Music (1981)	Turtle Dreams (1983)

Dolmen Music is a 1981 studio album by American composer and vocalist Meredith Monk recorded over two sessions in March 1980 and January 1981 and released on the ECM New Series—her first of twelve releases for the label.

== Background ==
DJ Shadow sampled the tracks "Biography" and "Dolmen Music" on the track "Midnight in a Perfect World" from Endtroducing..... (1996).

== Reception ==
Professional ratings
Review scores
Source	Rating
AllMusic	4/5 stars
Robert Christgau	A−

NME named it as the 42nd best album of 1981, and the album won the Preis der deutschen Schallplattenkritik (German Record Critics' Award) for Best Record of the Year in 1981. In 2017, NPR placed it at number 147 on its list of the "150 Greatest Albums Made by Women".

== Track listing ==
All tracks are written by Meredith Monk.

No.	Title	Length
1.	"Gotham Lullaby"	4:15
2.	"Travelling"	6:15
3.	"The Tale"	2:47
4.	"Biography"	9:24
5.	"Dolmen Music: Overture and Men's Conclave/Wa-ohs/Rain/Pine Tree Lullaby/Calls/Conclusion"	23:39

== Personnel ==
Credits adapted from the liner notes.

- Meredith Monk — voice, piano
- Collin Walcott — percussion (tracks 1–4), violin (tracks 1–4)
- Steve Lockwood — piano (track 3)
- Andrea Goodman — voice (track 5)
- Monika Solem — voice (track 5)
- Paul Langland — voice (track 5)
- Robert Een — voice (track 5), cello (track 5)
- Julius Eastman — voice (track 5), percussion (track 5)
