= Yin Mei =

Yin Mei (born in China) is a choreographer and dancer, and the founder of a dance company based in New York City.

== Life and career ==
Yin Mei was born and raised in China during the Cultural Revolution. Her experiences during this time greatly influenced her artistic philosophy. As she writes in her artist statement:

I am part of a generation of artists who lost their childhood to the Chinese Cultural Revolution, who experienced a world gone mad…Five thousand years of Chinese art and culture tossed in the garbage heap. From this, a generation of survivors – and of fighters – my generation – was born. But from this, how does one make art? How does one deal with memories that burn in the brain, that haunt one’s waking hours, that tattoo images of rage beneath one’s skin? For me, the trauma of my early years has led, not toward social engagement, nor toward abstraction, but toward the unmapped provinces of my own heart. What I have come to understand is that my work is essentially an exploration of the wounded self: How does a fighter dance?

Yin Mei started dancing professionally aged 14, joining China's Henan Province Dance Company; she moved to the United States in 1985.

Ms. Yin’s memories provide a driving force to her works. For example, Nomad, a quartet of pieces, is framed by voice-overs taken from Ms. Yin’s diaries as a 7-year old in China and includes revolutionary slogans.

== Yin Mei Dance company ==
Yin Mei Dance was founded in 1995 to further the choreographic and performance efforts of founder and artistic director Yin Mei. The company has performed across the United States in venues such as Jacob's Pillow Dance, La MaMa Experimental Theatre Club, and Dance Theater Workshop and internationally in Japan, China, and Germany.

Yin Mei Dance aims to evoke a personal or spiritual connection with audiences by offering interdisciplinary work that goes beyond the immediate performance. Artistic director Yin Mei melds visual art and Western contemporary dance with her training in Chinese court and folk dance, Peking Opera, martial arts, tai chi, and other traditional Asian dance forms to create dance theater works. To date, the company has 18 pieces in their repertory.

Yin Mei has pursued notable collaborations, including work with visual artist Xu Bing and composer Tony Prabowo on Empty Tradition/City of Peonies (1998), and visual artist Cai Guo-Qiang and composer Robert Een on /Asunder (2001).

== Reception ==
Yin Mei's piece Empty Tradition/City of Peonies draws inspiration from her hometown, Luoyang, where peonies have a long history, but were banned during the Cultural Revolution because they were too colorful.

The New York Times dance critic Jennifer Dunning wrote that Empty Tradition "recreates the experience of living under a repressive government and society where forbidden language, thoughts and feelings nonetheless push through like green grass cracking concrete paving."

Jennifer Dunning, writing of the piece "/Asunder" in the New York Times, describes Yin Mei as having "a striking visual sense and an authoritative way with social and literary themes."

Deborah Jowitt, writing in the Village Voice, describes the action and background of City of Paper. "In a perfectly synchronized duet for Mei and Kanako Yokota, the women .. move along a sheet of heavy paper that has been unrolled with a startling snap from the wings". The movements repeat, with a "purity" of effect. "The two spool out the movement as if it were an exercise in calligraphy—their coiling hands and arms and softly sinuous torsos fluent but precise. Whether the source behind the choreography is writing or some other exacting task, the dancers are serene." While, writes Jowitt, there is no "harsh critique" of Chairman Mao Zedong, the piece ends in a startling way. "Mei holds up a blank horizontal scroll. Bit by bit, black words appear on it: On a blank sheet of paper the freshest and most beautiful pictures can be painted. The words are Chairman Mao’s." The meaning, Jowitt notes, could be at once ironic and hopeful.

Larry Murray, writing in Berkshire on Stage, said of Yin Mei that she "combines her training in classical Chinese dance with contemporary forms and a unique spatial awareness to create powerful, innovative work."

Jennifer Fisher, in the Los Angeles Times, comments that Yin Mei "has a strong sense of design and is a dancer of luminous clarity.... In the strongly evocative solo that begins "/Asunder," her movement hallmarks emerge: a combination of delicacy and strong intention, and firmly rooted feet that support swooning explorations of arms and torso."

== Works ==
- A Scent Of Time (2010) – commissioned by The Beijing Dance Academy
- City Of Paper (2010) – collaboration with Dai Jian, Kota Yamazaki
- Cursive (2006) – also titled: Ink/Paper/Body/Scent, Wild Grass
- Nomad: The River (2005)
- Nomad: Tea (2002)
- /Asunder (2001)
- Empty Tradition/City Of Peonies (1998)
- Seeing In The Rain (2003)
- The Tipsy Concubine (1999)
- Empty Bell (1997)
- I Move To Keep Things Whole (1997)
- Sun/Moon/Me (1997)
- Love Suicides At Amijima (1996)
- Book Of Women (1996)
- Solo I & II (1996)
- Fan and Shakuhachi (1996)
- Legacies (1995)
- Shaman (1995)

== See also ==
- Cultural Revolution
- Tai chi
- Tanztheater
