= Songs from the Hill/Tablet =

Studio album by Meredith Monk
- Released: 1979
- Recorded: 1976–1977
- Studio: Soundmixers, New York City
- Genre: Modern classical, minimalism
- Length: 49:13
- Label: WERGO
- Producer: Richard Einhorn

Meredith Monk chronology
| Our Lady of Late (1973) | Songs from the Hill/Tablet (1979) | Dolmen Music (1981) |

Songs from the Hill/Tablet is an album by the American composer Meredith Monk. It was released in 1979 through WERGO.

== Track listing ==
All tracks are written by Meredith Monk.

Side one
| No. | Title | Length |
|---|---|---|
| 1. | "Lullaby No. 4" | 1:43 |
| 2. | "Mesa" | 2:09 |
| 3. | "Jade (Old Woman's Song)" | 2:27 |
| 4. | "Wa-lie-oh" | 3:48 |
| 5. | "Insect" | 1:52 |
| 6. | "Descending" | 1:50 |
| 7. | "Silo" | 2:17 |
| 8. | "Bird Code" | 1:52 |
| 9. | "Jew's Harp" | 2:27 |
| 10. | "Prairie Ghost" | 5:42 |

Side two
| No. | Title | Length |
|---|---|---|
| 1. | "Tablet" | 23:06 |

== Personnel ==
Musicians

- Andrea Goodman – piano and voice (B)
- Susan Kampe – piano and voice (B)
- Meredith Monk – vocals, piano (B)
- Monica Solem – voice (B)

Production

- Bob Bielecki – engineering (A1–A3, A5–A10)
- Neal Ceppos – engineering (B), mixing
- Richard Einhorn – production
- Sally Levine – design
- Kurt Munkacsi – engineering (A4)
- Sarah Van Ouwerkerk – photography
- Ed Trabanco – mixing (A1–A10)
