= Key (Meredith Monk album) =

Studio album by Meredith Monk
- Released: 1971
- Recorded: July 1970–January 1971 at Gary Weis's loft, Santa Monica and Ace Gallery, Los Angeles, California
- Genre: Modern classical, minimalism
- Length: 36:42
- Label: Increase (original release); Lovely Music, Ltd. (reissue)
- Producer: Collin Walcott

Meredith Monk chronology
Key (1971)	Our Lady of Late (1973)

Professional ratings
Review scores
Source	Rating
AllMusic	4/5 stars
Pitchfork Media	8.7/10

Key is the debut album of Meredith Monk, released in 1971 through Increase Records. In 2017, Tompkins Square re-released Key for Record Store Day.

== Track listing ==
All tracks are written by Meredith Monk.

Side one
No.	Title	Length
1.	"Porch"	2:14
2.	"Under Street"	4:18
3.	"What Does It Mean?"	3:56
4.	"Vision"	1:16
5.	"Fat Stream"	7:25

Side two
No.	Title	Length
1.	"Vision"	2:02
2.	"Do You Be?"	4:11
3.	"Vision"	0:35
4.	"Change"	3:44
5.	"Dungeon"	6:51

== Personnel ==
Musicians

- Lanny Harrison – vocals
- Dick Higgins – vocals
- Meredith Monk – vocals, Jew's harp, electronic organ
- Mark Monstermaker – vocals
- Daniel Ira Sverdlik – vocals
- Collin Walcott – Mr̥daṅgaṃ, vocals, production

Production

- Tom Clack – engineering
- Paul Gruwell – art direction
- John Horton – engineering, mixing
- Peter Moore – photography
- Daniel Nagrin – engineering
- Peter Pilafian – engineering
