= Atlas: An Opera in Three Parts =

Studio album by Meredith Monk
- Released: June 1993
- Recorded: June 1992
- Genre: Modern classical, minimalism
- Length: 128:27
- Label: ECM New Series; ECM 1491/92
- Producer: Manfred Eicher

Meredith Monk chronology
Facing North (1992)	Atlas: An Opera in Three Parts (1993)	Volcano Songs (1997)

Atlas: An Opera in Three Parts is the ninth studio album and first double album by Meredith Monk, recorded in June 1992 and released on the ECM New Series a year later, consisting a full-length recording of Monk's 1991 opera Atlas.

Professional ratings
Review scores
Source	Rating
AllMusic	4/5 stars

== Track listing ==
All tracks are written by Meredith Monk.

Disc one I: Personal Climate
No.	Title	Length
1.	"Overture (Out of Body)"	3:07
2.	"Travel Dream Song"	5:07
3.	"Home Scene"	2:38
4.	"Future Quest (The Call)"	11:15
5.	"Rite of Passage A"	0:57
6.	"Choosing Companions"	7:44
7.	"Airport"	9:19

II: Night Travel
No.	Title	Length
8.	"Night Travel"	3:14
9.	"Guides' Dance"	1:51
10.	"Agricultural Community"	14:36

Disc two
No.	Title	Length
1.	"Loss Song"	4:14
2.	"Campfire/Hungry Ghost"	7:43
3.	"Father's Hope"	1:13
4.	"Ice Demons"	6:20
5.	"Explorer #5/Lesson/Explorers' Procession"	6:04
6.	"Lonely Spirit"	3:33
7.	"Forest Questions"	10:19
8.	"Desert Tango"	7:52
9.	"Treachery (Temptation)"	2:11
10.	"Possibility of Destruction"	2:46

III: Invisible Light
No.	Title	Length
11.	"Out of Body 2"	2:58
12.	"Other Worlds Revealed"	1:28
13.	"Explorers' Junctures"	2:42
14.	"Earth Seen from Above"	7:34
15.	"Rite of Passage B"	1:42

== Personnel ==
=== Musicians ===
- Carlos Arévalo – vocals
- Thomas Bogdan – vocals
- Victoria Boomsma – vocals
- Janis Brenner – vocals
- Kathleen Carroll – viola
- Shi-Zheng Chen – vocals
- John Cipolla – bass clarinet
- Allison Easter – vocals
- Robert Een – vocals
- Diana Emerson – vocals
- Dina Emerson – vocals
- Emily Eyre – vocals
- Emily K. Eyre – vocals
- Arthur J. Jr. Fiacco – cello
- Katie Geissinger – vocals
- Ching Gonzalez – vocals
- Dana Hanchard – vocals
- Wayne Hankin – conductor, shawm, sheng, vocals
- Bill Hayes – glass harmonica
- Wendy Hill – vocals
- Susan Iadone – violin
- Stephen Kalm – vocals
- Darryl Kubian – violin
- Steve Lockwood – orchestration, keyboards
- David Meschter – sampler
- Meredith Monk – vocals, cello
- Bobby Osborne – vocals
- Robert Osborne – vocals
- Wilbur Pauley – vocals
- Anthony Pirollo – cello
- Cynthia Powell – keyboards
- Thad Wheeler – percussion
- James F. Wilson – French horn
- Randall K. Wong – vocals

=== Technical personnel ===
- Manfred Eicher – production
- Jan Erik Kongshaug – engineer
- James Farber – engineer
- Carol Bokuniewicz – design
- Jim Caldwell – photography
- Peter Moore – photography
- Larry Watson – photography
