= Piano Songs =

Studio album by Bruce Brubaker/Ursula Oppens
- Released: March 24, 2014
- Recorded: April 2012
- Studio: Jordan Hall, New England Conservatory, Boston, MA
- Genre: Minimalism
- Length: 47:03
- Label: ECM New Series
- Producer: Meredith Monk, Bruce Brubaker, Allison Sniffin

Meredith Monk chronology
Songs of Ascension (2011)	Piano Songs (2014)	On Behalf Of Nature (2016)

Professional ratings
Review scores
Source	Rating
Allmusic	4/5 stars

Piano Songs is a studio album by pianists Bruce Brubaker and Ursula Oppens performing music composed by Meredith Monk, released on March 24, 2014 by ECM New Series.

== Track listing ==
All music is composed by Meredith Monk.

No.	Title	Length
1.	"Obsolete Objects"	1:59
2.	"Ellis Island"	3:02
3.	"Folkdance"	4:03
4.	"Urban March (Shadow)"	3:08
5.	"Tower"	1:37
6.	"Paris"	3:11
7.	"Railroad (Travel Song)"	2:15
8.	"Parlour Games"	7:37
9.	"St. Petersburg Waltz"	7:04
10.	"Window in 7's"	2:46
11.	"Totentanz"	3:07
12.	"Phantom Waltz"	7:14

== Personnel ==
Adapted from the Piano Songs liner notes.

Musicians

- Bruce Brubaker – piano (1–5, 7, 8, 10–12), musical arrangements (4, 5, 8, 11)
- Ursula Oppens – piano (1–6, 8, 9, 11, 12)

Production and additional personnel

- Jody Elff – recording, editing
- Sascha Kleis – design
- Meredith Monk – production
- Jeremy Sarna – assistant engineer
- Allison Sniffin – production
- Christoph Stickel – mastering

== Release history ==
Region	Date	Label	Format	Catalog
Germany	2014	ECM New Series	CD	ECM 2374
