= Stringsongs =

2005 composition by Meredith Monk

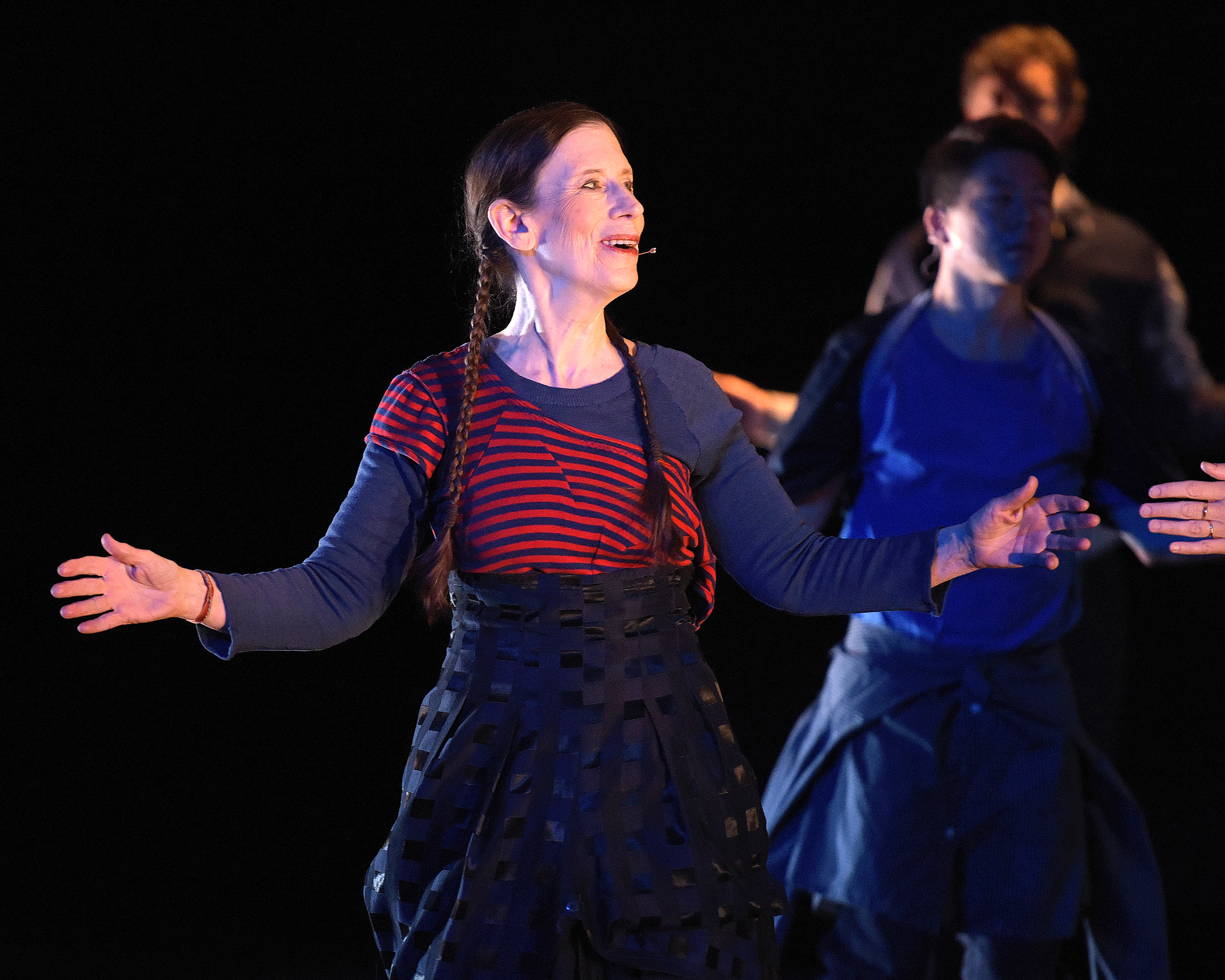
Meredith Monk in 2014

Stringsongs is a composition for string quartet by the American composer Meredith Monk. The work was commissioned by the Kronos Quartet who premiered the piece on January 22, 2005 in the Barbican Centre, London.

== Composition ==
Stringsongs was Monk's first composition for string quartet. She described her inspiration and the composition process in the score program notes, writing:

I explored using instruments to create unexpected textures and sounds in much the same way that I have worked with the voice over many years. I was inspired by the profound musicianship and passionate commitment of the Kronos Quartet. During the rehearsal period, as I got to know the players, the music came to life in surprising ways, colored by the distinctive "voice" of each musician.

=== Structure ===
The work has a duration of roughly 18 minutes and is composed in four movements:

1. Cliff Light
2. Tendrils
3. Obsidian Chorale
4. Phantom Strings

== Reception ==
Reviewing the world premiere, Tom Service of The Guardian praised Stringsongs, writing, "[Monk's] music sidesteps traditional string quartet forms to create a work of mysterious, mythic power." Nadia Sirota of WQXR-FM similarly lauded, "Her first string quartet, the piece explores texture and raw emotion that achieves maximum impact with minimum components."

The music critic George Hall was more critical of the music, however, calling the work "a more discursive four-movement piece that felt unwieldy."
