= Our Lady of Late =

Studio album by Meredith Monk
- Released: 1973
- Recorded: April 1, 1972 at Laighstreet Street Dance studio, New York City
- Genre: Modern classical, minimalism
- Length: 43:28
- Label: Minona (original release); WERGO (reissue)
- Producer: Collin Walcott

Meredith Monk chronology
Key (1971)	Our Lady of Late (1973)	Songs from the Hill/Tablet (1979)

Professional ratings
Review scores
Source	Rating
Allmusic	2/5 stars

Our Lady of Late is the second album by Meredith Monk, released in 1973 through Minona Records.

== Track listing ==
All tracks are written by Meredith Monk.

Side one
No.	Title	Length
1.	"Prologue"	2:28
2.	"Unison"	4:36
3.	"Knee"	1:26
4.	"Hey Rhythm"	2:43
5.	"Cow Song"	2:19
6.	"Sigh"	2:34
7.	"Morning"	1:34
8.	"Slide"	3:01
9.	"Waltz"	1:32

Side two
No.	Title	Length
1.	"Prophecy"	3:11
2.	"Dumb"	2:22
3.	"Conversation"	2:57
4.	"Low Ring"	3:06
5.	"High Ring"	1:48
6.	"Free"	2:30
7.	"Edge"	1:33
8.	"Scale Down"	2:53
9.	"Epilogue"	0:55

== Personnel ==
Musicians

- Meredith Monk – vocals, percussion
- Collin Walcott – percussion, production

Production

- Gary Alper – engineering
- Peter Moore – photography
- Daniel Zellman – mixing, mastering
