= Angel's Bone =

2011/2016 Opera by Du Yun and Royce Vavrek

- Opera by Du Yun
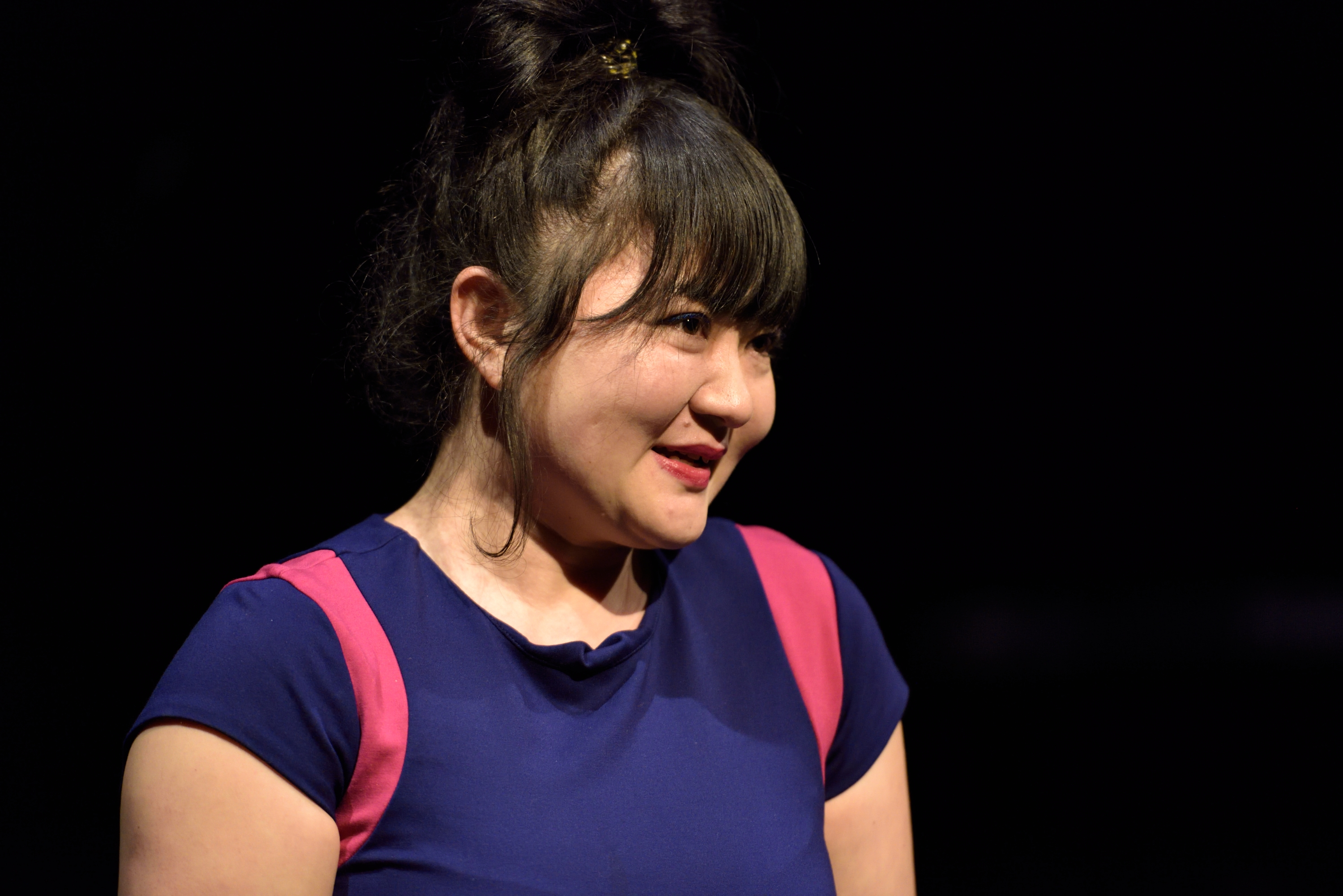
- Du Yun
- Librettist: Royce Vavrek
- Premiere: 6 January 2016; 3LD Art & Technology Center, New York City

Angel's Bone is an opera by composer Du Yun and librettist Royce Vavrek in one act that follows the plight of two angels discovered on earth who are forced into spiritual and sexual slavery at the hands of a financially troubled couple. The work is a contemporary parable that explores the dark effects behind modern-day slavery, and human trafficking and probes the psyche of traffickers. Du Yun draws her inspiration from a range of musical genres – from classical to punk to the cabaret.

== Performance history ==
The original 35-minute chamber version of Angel’s Bone was commissioned by the Mann Center for the Performing Arts. Philadelphia, and directed by Habib Azar.

Julian Wachner conducted the world premiere performance of the full-length opera with Novus NY and the Trinity Wall Street Choir. The production, which opened on January 6, 2016, at the 3LD Art & Technology Center in Greenwich Street, Lower Manhattan, as part of the Prototype Festival in New York City, was directed by Michael McQuilken and co-produced by Beth Morrison Projects, HERE, and Trinity Wall Street.

The opera's premiere in Asia took place on 10 November 2018 at the Kwai Tsing Theatre in Hong Kong during the New Vision Art Festival . The Ventura College streamed a production in January 2021.

The UK premiere took place at Aviva Studios, Manchester in May 2026, in a new production by English National Opera, directed by Kip Williams. It transferred to the London Coliseum in October of the same year.

== Roles ==
Roles, voice types, premiere cast
| Roles | Voice type | 35-minute chamber premiere, 2011 | Premiere cast, 6 January 2016 |
|---|---|---|---|
| Mrs. X.E. | mezzo-soprano | Hai-Ting Chin | Abigail Fischer |
| Mr. X.E. | baritone | Royce Vavrek | Kyle Pfortmiller |
| Boy Angel | tenor | Peter Tantsits | Kyle Bielfield |
| Girl Angel | vocalist | Du Yun | Jennifer Charles |
| Man on the TV | baritone | n/a | Thomas McCargar |
| Female Customer/TV Host | soprano | n/a | Melanie Russell |

Performance time: about 80 minutes

== Synopsis ==
Angel's Bone follows the plight of two angels whose nostalgia for earthly delights has, mysteriously, brought them back to our world. Battered and bruised from their long journey, they are found by a husband and wife, Mr. and Mrs. X. E.

Facing a financial crisis, the couple had grown far apart. The unspoken aggression between them is palpable. Nevertheless, when they find the fallen cherubs in their garden, Mr. and Mrs. X.E. Set out to nurse the wounded angels back to health.

They bathe them, wash the dirt from their nails and lock them in a room, leaving them in a claw-foot bathtub for a bed. They then decide to exploit the magical beings, clipping their wings and forcing them into prostitution to earn back their plucked feathers.

== Critical reception ==
"Du Yun's audacious and searing Angel's Bone. It's an appallingly good work when you consider that it takes on the subject of child trafficking and mixes in elements of magic realism and a musical cocktail of Renaissance polyphony, electronica, Modernism, punk rock and cabaret ... The director, Michael McQuilken, drew courageous and memorable performances from all." Corinna da Fonseca-Wollheim, The New York Times.

"Angel's Bone is a mature and complex work. It is a fable inside an allegory and its soundscape ranges across the history of Western music." Natalie Axton, Hyperallergic.

"Disturbing, powerful and original, effectively using electronics and video, the opera ended with the evil wife tearfully pleading her case on daytime TV, adding the final nail of credibility to a work that gave me nightmares, yet one that I would nonetheless see again." Anne Midgette, The Washington Post.

"Mezzo Abigail Fischer's wonderfully pitiless demeanor and chilly coloratura set up a Lady Macbeth-like Mrs. X.E.; Kyle Pfortmiller brought out the brutish insecurity of her husband, so easily persuaded to do her dirty work. Kyle Bielfield's wide vocal range and sweetness embodied the heartbreaking innocence of the Boy Angel; as the Girl Angel, Jennifer Charles's nonclassical voice scraped and howled against an electronic score, making her pain excruciatingly audible." Heidi Waleson, The Wall Street Journal.

The opera received the 2017 Pulitzer Prize for Music. The Pulitzer jury described the piece as a bold work "that integrates vocal and instrumental elements and a wide range of styles into a harrowing allegory for human trafficking in the modern world." Du Yun is the first Asian woman to receive the Pulitzer Prize for Music.

== Recordings ==
- Abigail Fischer (Mrs. X. E.), Kyle Pfortmiller (Mr. X.E.), Jennifer Charles (Girl Angel), Kyle Bielfield (Boy Angel), Thomas McCargar (Man on the TV), Melanie Russell (Female Customer/TV Host), Choir of Trinity Wall Street, NOVUS NY, recorded at National Sawdust, Williamsburg, New York, conducted by Julian Wachner. Label: VIA Records 2017.
