= Mercy (Meredith Monk album) =

Studio album by Meredith Monk
- Released: October 29, 2002
- Recorded: March 19–20, 2002
- Studio: Sorcerer Sound, New York
- Genre: Minimalism
- Length: 57:16
- Label: ECM New Series
- Producer: Tom Bogdan; Meredith Monk

Meredith Monk chronology
Volcano Songs (1997)	Mercy (2002)	Impermanence (2008)

Professional ratings
Review scores
Source	Rating
AllMusic	3.5/5 stars

Mercy is the eleventh album by Meredith Monk, released on October 29, 2002, through ECM New Series. In 2014, the fourteenth track, "Core Chant", was featured in the show True Detective.

== Track listing ==
Mercy: Opera for 6 Voices, 2 Keyboards, Percussion, Violin & Theremin
No.	Title	Writer(s)	Length
1.	"Braid 1 and Leaping Song" (for voices and ensemble)	Meredith Monk	8:14
2.	"Braid 2" (for voices and ensemble)	Meredith Monk	2:35
3.	"Urban March (Shadow)" (for voices, synthesizer and piano)	Meredith Monk	3:10
4.	"Masks" (for voices)	Meredith Monk	1:43
5.	"Line 1" (for cymbals with microphone)	Bohdan Hilash, John Hollenbeck, Allison Sniffi	1:14

Mercy: Opera for 6 Voices, 2 Keyboards, Percussion, Violin & Theremin
No.	Title	Writer(s)	Length
6.	"Doctor/Patient" (for voices, piano, marimba and vibraphone)	Meredith Monk	8:21
7.	"Line 2" (for cymbals with microphone and violin)	Bohdan Hilash, John Hollenbeck, Allison Sniffi	1:01

Mercy: Opera for 6 voices, 2 keyboards, percussion, violin & theremin
No.	Title	Writer(s)	Length
8.	"Woman at the Door" (for voices, piano and melodica)	Meredith Monk	5:55
9.	"Line 3 and Prisoner" (voices and ensemble)	Bohdan Hilash, John Hollenbeck, Allison Sniffi	5:23
10.	"Epilogue" (for voice, clarinet, piano and melodica)	Meredith Monk	1:54
11.	"Shaking" (for voices and ensemble)	Meredith Monk	3:05
12.	"Liquid Air" (for voices and bowed vibraphone)	Meredith Monk	3:53
13.	"Urban March (Light)" (for voices and ensemble)	Meredith Monk	6:05
14.	"Core Chant" (for voices and marimba)	Meredith Monk	4:43

== Personnel ==
Musicians

- Allison Easter – vocals (1)
- Theo Bleckmann – vocals (1–4, 6, 8, 9, 11–14)
- Katie Geissinger – vocals (1–4, 8, 9, 11–14)
- Ching Gonzalez – vocals (1–4, 8, 9, 11–14)
- Bohdan Hilash – A clarinet (1), soprano clarinet (1, 10), bass clarinet (9, 13), E♭ clarinet (13), contrabass clarinet (13)
- John Hollenbeck – bells (1, 9), xylophone (1, 11), vibraphone (1, 6, 12, 13), marimba (1, 2, 6, 13, 11, 14), piano (3), vocals (4), cymbals (5, 7, 9), melodica (8, 10), percussion (9), cowbell (11), gong (11), bass drum (13), percussion (13), triangle (13)
- Meredith Monk – vocals (1, 2, 4, 6, 8–14), production
- Allison Sniffin – viola (1), vocals (1, 2, 4, 8, 12, 13), piano (1, 6, 8–11, 14), synthesizer (3), violin (7)

Production

- Tom Bogdan – production
- Ann Hamilton – cover art
- Ulrike Körner – design
- Scott Lehrer – engineering, mixing
- Dieter Rehm – design
