= Impermanence (Meredith Monk album) =

Studio album by Meredith Monk
- Released: March 18, 2008
- Recorded: January 2007 at Avatar Studios, New York
- Genre: Minimalism
- Length: 65:06
- Label: ECM New Series
- Producer: Manfred Eicher

Meredith Monk chronology
mercy (2002)	Impermanence (2008)	Beginnings (2009)

Professional ratings
Review scores
Source	Rating
Allmusic	4.5/5 stars

Impermanence is the twelfth album by Meredith Monk, released on March 18, 2008 through ECM New Series.

== Track listing ==
No.	Title	Writer(s)	Length
1.	"Last Song" (for voices and piano)	Meredith Monk	7:18
2.	"Maybe 1" (for 8 pianos)	Meredith Monk	2:03
3.	"Little Breath" (for 4 voices, bass clarinet and elephant bells)	Meredith Monk	1:44
4.	"Liminal" (for 4 voices and chamber ensemble)	Meredith Monk	10:59
5.	"Disequilibrium" (for 6 voices and bicycle wheel)	Meredith Monk	2:26
6.	"Particular Dance" (for 7 voices, double ocarina, anklung, Balinese flute, zaphoon, punji, piano and percussion)	Meredith Monk	5:01
7.	"Between Song" (for 3 voices, clarinet, bass clarinet, piano, bells and vibraphone)	Meredith Monk	6:10
8.	"Passage" (for 7 voices)	Meredith Monk	1:59
9.	"Maybe 2" (for 6 voices, bass clarinet and bass drum)	Meredith Monk	3:07
10.	"Skeleton Lines" (for voice and chamber ensemble)	Meredith Monk	4:19
11.	"Slow Dissolve" (for chorus, violin, bass clarinet and glockenspiel)	Meredith Monk	2:35
12.	"Totentanz" (for 2 voices and chamber ensemble)	Meredith Monk	3:59
13.	"Sweep 1" (for paddle drums)	Bohdan Hilash, John Hollenbeck, Allison Sniffin	1:28
14.	"Rocking" (for chorus, bass clarinet, marimba and vibraphone)	Meredith Monk	5:17
15.	"Sweep 2" (for voice, ocean drum, Chinese temple bells, magnets and percussion)	Bohdan Hilash, John Hollenbeck, Allison Sniffin	1:26
16.	"Mieke's Melody No. 5" (for chorus, piano and vibraphone)	Mieke van Hoek	5:15

== Personnel ==
Musicians

- Theo Bleckmann – vocals
- Sasha Bogdanowitsch – vocals
- Ellen Fisher – piano, vocals
- Katie Geissinger – piano, vocals
- Ching Gonzalez – piano, vocals
- Bohdan Hilash – aulos, bamboo flute, bass clarinet, drums, double ocarina, piano, soprano saxophone, woodwind, zafoon
- John Hollenbeck – Angklung, glockenspiel, marimba, percussion, piano, vibraphone
- Silvie Jensen – vocals
- Meredith Monk – piano, vocals
- Allison Sniffin – piano, violin, vocals

Production

- Manfred Eicher – production
- Sascha Kleis – design
- James A. Farber – engineering
- John Sanchez – photography
