= Beginnings (Meredith Monk album) =

Compilation album by Meredith Monk
- Released: November 24, 2009
- Recorded: 1966–1980
- Genre: Minimalism
- Length: 57:39
- Label: Tzadik
- Producer: Meredith Monk

Meredith Monk chronology
Impermanence (2008)	Beginnings (2009)	Songs of Ascension (2011)

Professional ratings
Review scores
Source	Rating
Allmusic	4/5 stars

Beginnings is a compilation album by Meredith Monk, released on November 24, 2009, through Tzadik Records.

== Track listing ==
All tracks are written by Meredith Monk, except "Candy Bullets and Moon" co-written with Don Preston.

No.	Title	Length
1.	"Greensleeves"	4:07
2.	"Nota"	1:41
3.	"Duet for Voice and Echoplex"	3:21
4.	"Candy Bullets and Moon"	4:26
5.	"Trance"	5:17
6.	"Epic I"	3:20
7.	"Paris"	3:23
8.	"Biography"	7:49
9.	"Mill"	2:18
10.	"The Tale"	1:48
11.	"Quarry Weave"	2:51
12.	"Epic II"	1:58
13.	"Tower"	1:39
14.	"Mill"	1:44
15.	"Do You Be?"	3:28
16.	"Quarry Procession"	5:05
17.	"Porch"	3:24

== Personnel ==
Musicians

- Andrea Goodman – vocals (11)
- Lanny Harrison – percussion (5)
- Susan Kampe – vocals (11)
- Meredith Monk – vocals (1–6, 8–17), piano (7–10, 16), organ (6, 12–15), guitar (1, 2), bass guitar (4), Jew's harp (5), production
- Don Preston – drums (4), organ (4), recording (4)
- Monica Solem – vocals (11)
- Collin Walcott – percussion (5)

Production

- David Behrman – recording (17)
- Heung-Heung Chin – design
- Scott Hull – mastering (5)
- Jack Mitchell – photography
- Peter Pilafian – recording (5)
- Robert Withers – recording (2)
- Daniel Zellman – recording (1, 3)
