= Possible Sky =

Possible Sky is a composition for choir and orchestra by the American composer Meredith Monk. The work was commissioned by the conductor Michael Tilson Thomas and the New World Symphony. It was first performed April 4, 2003 in Miami Beach, Florida by Thomas and the New World Symphony. The composition was Monk's first work for orchestra.

== Composition ==
=== Inspiration and development ===
In composing Possible Sky, Monk made several visits to Miami to work with the musicians in developing the piece. She described this process in the score program notes, writing:

Since exploring and extending possibilities for the voice is the heart of my work, I asked the musicians to share the extended techniques for their instruments that they were aware of as well as find new sounds during the session. I sang phrases so that they could try playing them on their instruments in an unaccustomed way. We also experimented with sketches of material which I had composed in New York. Some of the fruit of those sessions has found its way into Possible Sky.

Monk added:

The interaction with these young musicians was playful and rewarding. This exchange is unusual in the orchestra world where players usually read and interpret a finished score. The concept of this project proposed by Michael Tilson Thomas with the encouragement and support of R. Kurt Landon was to offer the musicians a chance to experience in a very direct way the creation of a new work.

=== Instrumentation ===
The work is scored for SAB choir and an orchestra comprising two flutes (2nd doubling piccolo), three oboes (1st doubling cor anglais), three clarinets (1st doubling E-flat clarinet, 3rd doubling bass clarinet), three bassoons (3rd doubling contrabassoon), four horns, three trumpets, three trombones, tuba, harp, piano (doubling synthesizer), four percussionists, and strings.

== Reception ==
When Monk was named the 2012 Composer of the Year by Musical America, the Los Angeles Times music critic Mark Swed gave special praise to Possible Sky, writing, "arresting Monkian melodies, bittersweet and inexplicable but somehow immediate, percolate through the orchestra." He added, "Even more startling, though, is the physicality. Orchestra musicians, bolstered by members of Monk's ensemble, sound as though they, too, make music from their bodies rather than merely following the directions of notes on a page."
