= Ping Chong =

American theatre director, choreographer and artist

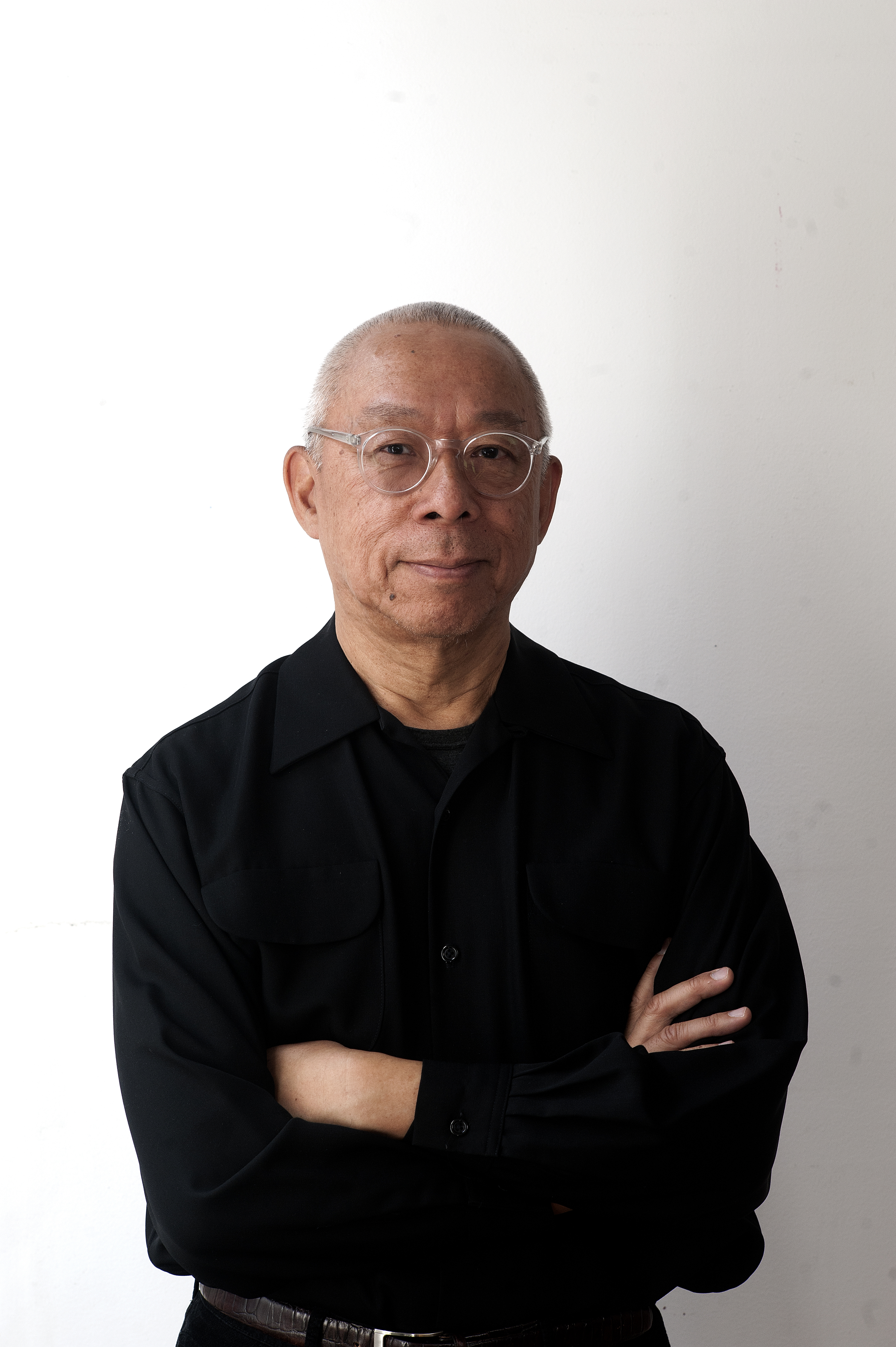
- Chong in 2011
- Born: October 2, 1946 (age 79); Toronto, Canada
- Education: School of Visual Arts, and Pratt Institute
- Occupations: Theater Director, Interdisciplinary Artist, Choreographer, Playwright, Filmmaker, and Visual Artist

Ping Chong (Chinese: 張家平; pinyin: Zhāng Jiāpíng; born 1946) is a Canadian-born American contemporary theatre director, choreographer, video and installation artist. Born in Toronto and raised in the Chinatown section of Manhattan, Chong is considered a seminal figure in Asian-American theatre and the Asian-American arts movement.

== Career and works ==
Originally trained as a visual artist and filmmaker at the School of Visual Arts and Pratt Institute, Chong studied dance and performance with Meredith Monk and began his theatrical career as a member of Monk's company, the House, in 1971. Chong was both a performer and collaborator on The House. His co-created work includes The Travelogue Series: Paris 1972, Chacon 1974, and Venice/Milan 1976. His final collaboration with Monk was The Games in 1983 which premiered at the Schaubuhne in Berlin, in then-West Germany.

Chong created his first independent theatre work, Lazarus, in 1972. He has worked in the visual arts, film, dance, and Chinese opera (both his grandfather and father were directors and librettists). In the earliest works, such as Lazarus, Fear and Loathing in Gotham (1975), and Humboldt's Current (1977), the theme of otherness reflected Chong's personal sense of estrangement from the society he grew up in as a first-generation immigrant in a segregated city. Later, the theme became more universal, encompassing a broader range of material. Many of Chong's works concern colonialism and the collision of cultures and/or issues of cultural diversity, and frequently draw on documentary and interview-based materials (as in the Undesirable Elements series.)

Ping Chong + Company (originally called the Fiji Theatre Company) was founded in 1975. The company's mission is "to explore the meaning of contemporary theatre and art on a national and international level" and "to create and tour innovative multi-disciplinary works of theater and art that explore the intersections of history, race, art and technology in the modern world." The company has created and toured more than 100 works by Chong and his collaborators, which have been presented at theaters, performing arts centers, and arts festivals around the world.

Key works in Chong's evolution include Humboldt's Current (1977), from his first decade. It is an early work anticipating Chong's interest in geopolitical and historical subjects. It received an Obie Award. In 1980, Ping Chong formed a small ensemble, and it was with this group of performers, which included Jeannie Hutchins, Louise Smith, John Fleming, and Brian Hallas, that he evolved his performance style. A.M./A.M.—The Articulated Man (1981) marked Chong's interest in choreographic, non-literary theater. The second decade of Ping Chong's career includes 3 major works back-to-back. Nosferatu, A Symphony of Darkness (1985), Angels of Swedenborg (1985) and Kind Ness (1986). Kind Ness was the recipient of a USA Playwright's Award in 1988. The 1990s marked major changes in Ping Chong's work. It is at this time that he disbanded his decade old ensemble in order to explore a solo career. From 1990 with the East/West Quartet: Deshima, Chinoiserie (1996), After Sorrow (1997), Pojagi (1999) and in 1992 with the launch of the Undesirable Elements series, the work took a turn towards poetic documentary and historical subjects. The exception to this is the puppet theater works beginning with Kwaidan (1998) which largely nods toward Chong's earlier allegorical works.

Ping Chong's early interest in puppetry starting with Lazarus in 1972 was given full expression in the creation of large scale productions of puppet theatre works including, Kwaidan (1998) which received Unima-USA's Citation of Excellence in the Art of Puppetry, Obon: Tales of Rain and Moonlight (2002), the sequel to Kwaidan, and Cathay: Three Tales of China (2005), Kwaidan and Obon were both based on Kwaidan, Japanese ghost stories collected and adapted by Lafcadio Hearn. Cathay, a commission by the Kennedy Center for the Performing Arts, was set in China and used three interconnected stories to explore three eras of Chinese history: the Tang Dynasty, the Second Sino-Japanese War, the Japanese invasion during World War II, and contemporary China today. Cathay was named one of the Top 10 Shows of the 2005-2006 Season by NY Theatre Wire and was awarded three Henry Hewes Awards for achievement in theatrical design.

Since 1992, Chong and his collaborators have created over 70 works in the Undesirable Elements project, an ongoing series of oral-history theater works exploring issues of race, culture, and identity in the lives of individuals in specific communities. The development process includes an extended residency and rehearsal period during which Ping Chong and collaborators conduct intensive interviews with potential participants who are not generally performers, from the local community. These interviews then form the basis of a script, performed by the interviewees, which covers the historical and personal narratives of individuals who are in some way living between two cultures. Chong has often described the series as, "Seated operas for the spoken word." One of the most recent entries in the series is Beyond Sacred: Voices of Muslim Identity which started touring in 2016. Beyond Sacred is an interview-based theatre production exploring the diverse experiences of Muslim communities in the United States. The five cast members of Beyond Sacred vary in many ways but share the common experience of coming of age in a post-9/11 New York City, at a time of increasing Islamophobia. They are young men and women that reflect a wide range of Muslim identities, including those who have converted to Islam, those who were raised Muslim, but have since left the faith, those who identify as “culturally” Muslim, and those who are observant on a daily basis. It stars Tiffany Yasmin Abdelghani, Ferdous Dehqan, Kadin Herring, Amir Khafagy and Maha Syed.

In 2014, Chong and dramaturg, director, and playwright Talvin Wilks created Collidescope: Adventures in Pre- and Post-Racial America in collaboration with undergraduate and graduate designers and actors in the University of Maryland School of Theatre, Dance, and Performance Studies. Of the work, Chong says, "In response to the recent killings of Trayvon Martin, shooting of Jordan Davis, shooting of Michael Brown and the seemingly endless killings of black men and boys for unarmed offenses, we have designed Collidescope to be a collision-course view of the legacy and psyche behind this history of racial violence, racism and social injustice in America." Subsequent adaptations have performed at the University of Massachusetts Amherst and Wake Forest University.

There are aspects of Chong's prolific career that have remained under the radar. Primarily an artist of the theater, he also, when the opportunity arose, created works of video art, pure dance works, and installations. The two-dance works are, I Will Not be Sad In This World (1991), Baldwin/NOW (2016). Video works include the video adaptation of I Will Not Be Sad In This World (1992) and Plage Concrete (1988). His installation work includes Kind Ness not to be confused with his play Kind Ness, a commission by MIT's List Visual Arts Center in its inaugural season in 1985. Another highlight of Chong's installation work was Testimonial commissioned for the Venice Bienalle.

In 2023, Chong was honored with an Obie Award for Lifetime Achievement. He is featured in the 2025 documentary about Meredith Monk entitled Monk in Pieces.

Works
Title	Year	Medium	Collaborator(s), notes
A Universal History of Infamy: Variations on Nocturne in 1200 Seconds	2020	Visual art and installation	Kenya Bullock, Jaime Sunwoo, Matt Chilton, Zakaria Khafagy, Irisdelia Garcia
Nocturne Remix	2020	Film and media	Edwin Aguila, Kenya Bullock, Irisdelia Garcia, Zakaria Khafagy
Collidescope 4.0 (University of Minnesota)	2019	Theater	Talvin Wilks
Difficult Lives	2019	Theater	Hiromi Sakamoto and cast
ALAXSXA | ALASKA	2017	Theater	Ryan Conarro, Justin Perkins, Gary Upay'aq Beaver (Central Yup'ik)
Cage Is Stage	2017	Visual art and installation	Danny Yunh
Collidescope 3.0 (Wake Forest University)	2017	Theater	Talvin Wilks
Collidescope 2.0 (UMass Amherst)	2016	Theater	Talvin Wilks
Baldwin/NOW	2016	Dance	Ensemble
PUSH! Real Athletes. Real Stories. Real Theatre.	2015	Theater	Sara Zatz and performers
Beyond Sacred: Voices of Muslim Identity	2015	Theater	Sara Zatz, Ryan Conarro, and performers
Collidescope: Adventures in Pre- and Post-Racial America	2014	Theater	Talvin Wilks
Brooklyn '63	2013	Theater	Talvin Wilks and performers
Angels of Swedenborg (2011)	2011	Dance	John Fleming
The Devil You Know	2010	Puppetry, theater	
Cry for Peace: Voices From The Congo	2010	Theater	Kyle Bass, Sara Zatz, and performers
Throne of Blood	2010	Theater	
Invisible Voices: New Perspectives On Disability	2009	Theater	Sara Zatz and performers
The Women of the Hill	2009	Theater	Talvin Wilks and cast
Secret History: The Philadelphia Story	2009	Theater	Sara Zatz and performers
Delta Rising	2008	Theater	Talvin Wilks and cast
Inside/Out...voices from the disability community	2008	Theater	Sara Zatz and performers
Tales from the Salt City	2008	Theater	Sara Zatz and performers
Undesirable Elements/Asian America	2007	Theater	Sara Zatz and performers
Cocktail	2007	Theater	Vince LiCata
Six Lives	2007	Theater	Sara Zatz, Bonnie Morris, Michael Robins, and performers
Testimonial II	2006	Visual art and installation	Michiki Okaya
Native Voices-Secret History	2005	Theater	Sara Zatz and performers
Undesirable Elements/Ten Years Later	2005	Theater	Sara Zatz, the performers, Sean Kelley-Pegg, Bonnie Morris, Mai Moua
Undesirable Elements/Albuquerque	2005	Theater	Sara Zatz and performers
Cathay: Three Tales of China	2005–2012	Puppetry	
Secret Histories: Seattle Youth	2004	Theater	Sara Zatz and performers
BLIND NESS: The Irresistible Light of Encounter	2004	Theater, puppetry, circus	Michael Rohd, Bobby Bermea, Jeff Randall, Burke Walker
Secret History: Journeys Abroad, Journeys Within	2004	Theater	Leyla Modirzadeh, Sara Zatz, and cast
God Favors The Predator	2004	Theater	Michael Rohd
La Clemenza Di Tito	2003	Music and opera	
Undesirable Elements/Pioneer Valley	2003	Theater	Talvin Wilks and cast
Undesirable Elements/Hanover	2002	Theater	Michael Rohd and cast
Undesirable Elements/Berlin	2002	Theater	Michael Rohd and cast
UE 92/02	2002	Theater	Talvin Wilks and cast
Children of War	2002	Theater	
Reason	2002	Theater	Michael Rohd
EDDA: Viking Tales of Lust, Greed and Family	2001–2002	Theater	Victoria Abras
Undesirable Elements/Madison, WI	2001	Theater	
Undesirable Elements/Atlanta	2001	Theater	Talvin Wilks and cast
Secret Histories/Charleston	2001	Theater	Talvin Wilks and cast
Obon: Tales of Rain and Moonlight	2002–2003	Puppetry, theater	
Secret History	2000	Theater	
Undesirable Elements/Washington DC	2000	Theater	Michael Rohd and cast
Undesirable Elements/Chicago	1999	Theater	Michael Rohd and cast
Undesirable Elements/East Harlem	1999	Theater	Emerald Trinket Monsod, Alain Jezequel, and cast
Undesirable Elements/Hamilton College	1999	Theater	
Pojagi	1999–2000	Theater	
Undesirable Elements: A/P/A	1999	Theater	
SlutForArt	1999–2002	Dance, theater	Muna Tseng
Truth and Beauty	1999–2005	Theater	Michael Rohd, Jeff Randall
Undesirable Elements/Newark	1998	Theater	
Nocturne in 1200 Seconds	1998	Theater	
Undesirable Elements/Seattle	1998	Theater	
Kwaidan	1998–2000	Theater, puppetry	
Undesirable Elements/Yellow Springs	1997	Theater	
Undesirable Elements/Rotterdam	1997	Theater	Dave Schwab and cast
Undesirable Elements/Los Angeles	1997	Theater	David Mohrmann and cast
After Sorrow	1997–1998	Dance, theater	Muna Tseng
Curlew River	1997	Music and opera	
98.6: A Convergence in 15 Minutes	1996–2007	Dance, theater	
Interfacing Joan	1996–1997	Theater	Written by Louise Smith
Undesirable Elements/Tokyo (Gaijin)	1995	Theater	Hiromi Sakamoto and cast
Testimonial	1995	Visual art and installation	Fumio Nanjo, Dana Friis-Hansen
Persuasion	1994	Theater	Anne Basting, Vince LiCata
Chinoiserie	1994–1995	Music, opera, theater	Michael Matthews, Regine Anna Seckinger, Ric Oquita
Undesirable Elements/Twin Cities	1994	Theater	Emerald Trinket Monsod, Cochise Anderson, and cast
Undesirable Elements/New York	1993	Theater	
Undesirable Elements/Cleveland	1993	Theater	
American Gothic	1992	Theater	
A Facility for the Containment and Channeling of Undesirable Elements	1992	Visual art and installation	Carlos Solanas
I Will Not Be Sad in This World	1991/2008	Dance, film, media	
Elephant Memories	1990–1994	Theater	
Deshima	1990–1996	Theater, dance	Michael Matthews
Tempus Fugit	1990	Visual art and installation	Curtis Carter
4AM America	1990–1991	Theater	
Noiresque: The Fallen Angel	1989	Theater	
Brightness	1989	Circus	Louise Smith, designers, and performers
In The Absence of Memory	1989	Visual art and installation	
Skin - A State of Being	1989	Theater	
Quartetto	1988	Theater	Michael Matthews
Snow	1988	Theater	
Plage Concrete	1988	Visual art and installation	Gary Garrels, Jock Reynolds
Without Law, Without Heaven	1987	Theater	Written by Norman Duke
Maraya - Acts of Nature in Geological Time	1987–1988	Theater	
KIND NESS	1986–1993	Theater	
Nosferatu	1985–1991/2017	Theater	
Angels of Swedenborg	1985–1989	Dance, theater	John Fleming
Kind Ness	1985	Visual art and installation	Katy Kline
A Race	1983–1984	Theater	
Astonishment and The Twins	1984–1987	Theater	Louise Smith
Anna Into Nightlight	1982–1983	Dance, film and media, puppetry, theater	
Nuit Blanche, A Select View of Earthlings	1981–1985	Theater	Louise Smith, John Miglietta, Tone Blevins, Pablo Vela
A.M./A.M. - The Articulated Man	1981–1985	Dance, theater	
Rainer and the Knife	1981–1982	Theater	Rob List
Humboldt's Current	1977–1980	Theater	
Fear and Loathing in Gotham	1975–1982	Theater	
I Flew to Fiji, You Went South	1973	Theater	
Lazarus	1972–1980	Theater	
