= Atlas (opera) =

1991 Meredith Monk opera

Atlas is an opera in three acts composed by Meredith Monk who also wrote the libretto and choreographed the dances. It is scored for 18 voices and a small chamber orchestra which includes a shawm and a glass harmonica. The story is very loosely based on the life and writings of the explorer Alexandra David-Néel, where "travel is a metaphor for spiritual quest and commitment to inner vision." The story is told primarily through wordless vocal sounds with brief interjections of spoken text in Mandarin Chinese and English.

The opera was co-commissioned by Houston Grand Opera, the Walker Art Center in Minneapolis, and the American Music Theater Festival in Philadelphia. It premiered at Houston Grand Opera on February 22, 1991.

== Productions ==
Its premiere in Houston was followed by performances that same year in Philadelphia and Minneapolis. It subsequently toured in the U.S. and Europe and had its New York premiere in May 1992 at the Brooklyn Academy of Music.

In June 2019, the first performance of Atlas not directed by Meredith Monk herself was staged by director Yuval Sharon and the Los Angeles Philharmonic.

== Roles ==
Role	Premiere Cast February 22, 1991 Conductor: Wayne Hankin
Alexandra, age 13	Dina Emerson
Alexandra from 25-45	Meredith Monk
Alexandra at 60	Sally Gross
Mother	Wendy Hill
Father	Thomas Bogdan
Chen Qing	Chen Shi-Zheng
Franco Hartmann	Stephen Kalm
Erik Magnussen	Robert Een
Gwen St. Clair	Dana Hanchard

== Synopsis ==
Part 1: Personal Climate

Living in a suburban home, the teenaged Alexandra dreams of distant places while her parents express concern for her future. The first vision of her Spirit Guides appear to her in the form of a horse, and provide her with the courage to pursue what she has seen in her imagination. As she prepares for her journey her parents encourage her but mourn her departure. Time passes. The adult Alexandra selects companions to accompany her on her journey. Two are chosen: Cheng Qing, from Hunan whose earliest memory is "the sound of my grandmother’s voice" and who wants to test his courage. The other is Erik Magnussen from Jørpeland whose earliest memory is "my first pair of roller skates" and who seeks to see the world. The third applicant, Franco Hartmann, is not accepted. The three explorers celebrate as their journey commences.

Part 2: Night Travel

The group adds two additional explorers: Franco Hartmann from Bolzano whose earliest memory is "burning my hand on the kitchen stove" and who wants to "kiss every woman on Earth" as well as Gwen St. Clair from Montserrat whose earliest memory is "watching a lizard on the wall" and who wants "to find a little quiet." As the companions explore the Earth, each undergoes an ordeal which tests their inner resources. By the end, only four have survived. Erik, the fifth, has succumbed to the temptation of a "militaristic, technocratic society run amok." Unsuccessful their attempt to pry away Erik, the remaining four ascend to a "timeless, radiant place...

Part 3: Invisible Light

...where they come into spiritual knowledge." Now older and wiser, Alexandra returns to Earth, sitting at table, drinking a cup of coffee which was also her first memory. She has now come full circle, finding "what she was looking for in the simple acts and tendernesses of the moment. What has seemed to have been the depiction of an expedition has become the inner journey of a soul."

== Recording ==
A full-length recording of the opera, Atlas: An Opera in Three Parts, was released in 1993 by ECM Records.
