= Sweetland (surname) =

Sweetland is a surname. Notable people with the surname include:

- Dale Sweetland (born 1949), American politician
- Doug Sweetland, American animator and film director
- Edwin Sweetland (1875–1950), American football player, coach and academic administrator
- Fred Sweetland (1893–1958), American football player
- George Sweetland (1872–1954), American football player, coach and physician
- Kirsten Sweetland (born 1988), Canadian triathlete
- Les Sweetland (1901–1974), American baseball player
- Monroe Sweetland (1910–2006), American politician
- William H. Sweetland (1856–1932), Justice of the Rhode Island Supreme Court
