= JoAnn Verburg =

American photographer

JoAnn Verburg is an American photographer. Verburg is married to poet Jim Moore, who is frequently portrayed as reading the newspaper or napping in her photographs. She lives and works in St. Paul, Minnesota and Spoleto, Italy.

== Early life and education ==
JoAnn Verburg was born in 1950 in Summit, New Jersey. She studied at Ohio Wesleyan University, earning her B.A. in sociology in 1972. While she was studying sociology at OWU, she realized as she was looking at Edward Weston's Daybooks and Robert Frank's photo book The Americans that photography can also be art. She worked at the Philadelphia Museum of Art in the innovative Urban Outreach department which encouraged the awareness of art from 1972 to 1974. She earned her M.F.A. in photography from the Rochester Institute of Technology in 1976. She studied photography with a sculptor while working with multiple artists and developing a thesis that addressed issues of time in photography. Between 1978 and 1981, Verburg led an Artist Support Program at Polaroid Corporation where she invited painters and photographers to experiment with the large format 20 x 24 and 40 x 80 cameras. In 1981 her career pivoted to teaching, when she accepted a visiting artist position at the Minneapolis College of Art and Design. Since then she has also taught at Yale University.

== Style ==
In her photography, Verburg uses a large format camera and shoots life-size portraits, still lifes, and landscapes. She works in diptychs and triptychs, using vibrant color palettes. In the 1980s she shot group portraits across multiple frames. She began photographing Italian landscapes in the mid-1990s. Other common subjects include dancers and time-based art. Considering the evolution of her photography, Verburg notes that her practice "treat[s] photographs more and more like sculpture," considering the viewer's relationship to setting, scale and time.

JoAnn would often take photographs of her husband no matter how or what he was doing. Oftentimes, her husband was not dressed. JoAnn states, "It's not that I didn't notice he didn't have clothes on in the pictures, but those terms of nude and naked to me felt like they are coming out of a dissertation on art."

Verburg has held over 75 group shows and over 20 solo exhibitions, including those at the Minneapolis Institute of Arts, the Kansas City Art Institute, and a retrospective "Present Tense: Photographs by JoAnn Verburg" at Museum of Modern Art in New York in 2007. She is the recipient of multiple awards including a Guggenheim Fellowship and multiple fellowships from the Bush Foundation and the McKnight Foundation. Her work is included in the permanent collections of the Museum of Modern Art in New York; the Whitney Museum of American Art; the Museum of Fine Arts in Houston; the National Portrait Gallery in Washington, D.C.; the Walker Art Center in Minneapolis; the Minneapolis Institute of Art; the Los Angeles County Museum of Art; the San Francisco Museum of Modern Art.

In addition to photography, Verburg has produced public art for the City of Minneapolis, the University of Minnesota, the Mill City Museum, and Art Park near Niagara Falls.

== Projects ==
From 1977 to 1979, she worked as project manager for the Rephotographic Survey Project, replicating frontier photography from the 19th century. The focus of this project was to re-photograph sites that were previously shot by well-known 19th-century photographers of the American West, using the same vantage point, similar equipment and under comparable weather conditions. When she was working on this project, she noticed that when one viewed the photos side by side, the pair suggested movement-the growth and development, and dissolution that occurred after the 19th century photographers made their pictures.

== Selected exhibitions ==
- New Works, 1984, Thomson Gallery, Minneapolis, Minnesota
- Present on the Road to Bazzano, 2001, Minneapolis Institute of Arts, Minneapolis, Minnesota
- Poet Under Water, 2006, G. Gibson Gallery, Seattle, Washington
- Present Tense: Photographs by Joann Verburg, 2007, Museum of Modern Art, New York, New York

== Group exhibitions ==
- Philadelphia Wall Art, 1973, Philadelphia Museum of Art, Philadelphia, Pennsylvania
- Labor/Leisure, 1994, John Michael Kohler Arts Center, Sheboygan, Wisconsin
