= Elliot Carter =

American writer and historian

Elliot Carter is a writer and historian in Washington, D.C.

== Life and career ==
Carter is a contributing writer for the Washington Post, Politico, Washingtonian Magazine and Slate. His work has appeared in outlets such as Atlas Obscura, Vice, Real Clear Defense, and DCist. His work is heavily focused on Washington D.C.’s architecture, geography and history.

In 2016, Carter obtained and published maps of the District of Columbia compiled during the Cold War by a military intelligence office in the USSR. He noted in an interview that the Soviet maps were far more detailed than their publicly available U.S. counterparts, capturing sensitive information about military bases and the layout of utility infrastructure.

In 2017, Carter’s research about the atomic bomb-proof vault that protects the U.S. Constitution led to the rediscovery of a refrigerator-sized electrical model of the vault in the basement of the National Archives. The device was subsequently restored, and now stands in the Archives building on Pennsylvania Avenue beside a commemorative historical plaque.

In 2018 Carter was awarded a grant from the D.C. Commission on the Arts and Humanities “to compile a meticulous anthology of all the tunnels in the District — subway and freight rail tunnels, pedestrian passageways, underground steam tunnels, sewage and water pipelines.” According to an article in CityLab, Carter is using tunnels to explore the “cultural history of the federal government and the city where it sits.”
