= Du Yun =

Chinese-American composer and performer

Du Yun 杜韵
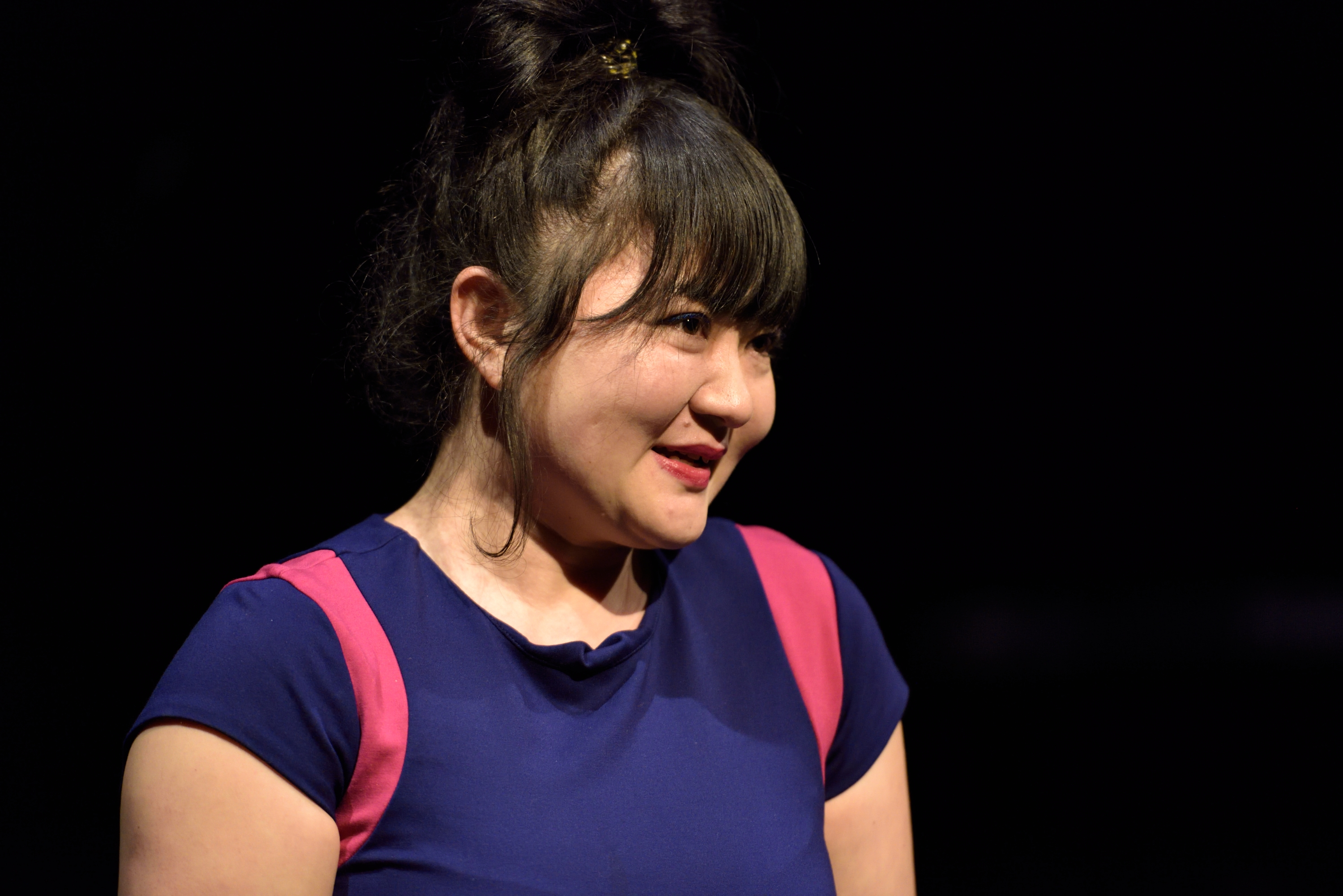
- Du Yun, New York City

Background information
- Born: June 18, 1977 (age 49); Shanghai, China
- Genres: classical, Avant-garde, experimental, punk, crossover, folk, electronic, alternative rock, pop, World
- Occupations: composer; musician; performance artist; producer
- Years active: 2000–present
- Labels: Modern Sky, National Sawdust Tracks, Oxingale, Pentatone, New Focus Records, Deutsche Grammophon
- Website: channelduyun.com

Du Yun
- Traditional Chinese: 杜韻
- Simplified Chinese: 杜韵
Transcriptions
Standard Mandarin
- Hanyu Pinyin: Dù Yùn

Du Yun (traditional Chinese: 杜韻, simplified Chinese: 杜韵) is a Chinese-born American composer, performer, musician and performance artist. She won the 2017 Pulitzer Prize for Music for her opera Angel's Bone, with libretto by Royce Vavrek. Du Yun was named as one of the 38 Great Immigrants by the Carnegie Corporation of New York in 2018, and received a 2019 Grammy nomination in the category of Best Classical Contemporary Composition for her work Air Glow. In its decade review, UK's Classic FM listed Du Yun's winning of the Pulitzer as No. 6 in "10 ways the 2010s changed classical music forever." Rolling Stone Italia named her as one of the women composers who defined the 2010s. In 2024, Du Yun was elected to the American Academy of Arts and Sciences.

== Early life and education ==
Du Yun was born in Shanghai, China. She began studying piano at the age of four, attending the primary school Shanghai Conservatory of Music for piano. She studied composition at the middle school Shanghai Conservatory of Music with Deng Erbo. Du Yun later went to the United States for college and graduated from the Oberlin Conservatory of Music with a Bachelor of Music degree in composition, under Randolph Coleman, and received a Ph.D. in music composition from Harvard University with Bernard Rands and Mario Davidovsky.

On her earlier years growing up in Shanghai, Du Yun recounted, in her contribution to WQXR, that neither of her parents went to college and both were factory workers in China.

When Du Yun studied in junior high school in Shanghai, she collected cassette tapes from singer Faye Wong, Chen Sheng, Dou Wei, Pink Floyd and Sinéad O'Connor. She counts Dou Wei and Faye Wong among the Chinese pop musicians who have had the most influence on her musical life. She credits filmmakers Wong Kar-Wai and Quentin Tarantino as some of the major influences on her style.

When she studied in high school, she spent pocket money on CDs that had impactful covers. Pink Floyd, Cocteau Twins, Björk, Sinead O'Connor, and Kraftwerk entered her world all at once. She indulged in Krautrock and psychedelic rock.

During her first year of college, British band Portishead released a new album, and Du Yun fell into the world of trip hop. Her psychedelic style was later used in many of her works, and in 2012, she released her first studio album, Shark in You, which featured a variety of styles, from experimental dance music to cabaret and jazz electronic music.

== Career ==
I think artists should have the absolute freedom to work with however they want and however they wish to express. I also think that creating works engaging social topics is equally important and those things are not exclusive. More and more, I am concerned about human condition. Art just happen to be the means I know how to engage.

— Du Yun

Du Yun won the Pulitzer Prize for Music for her opera Angel's Bone in 2017, making her the first Asian woman to win this prize in music. The opera's production in Hong Kong in 2018 won the best of the performances of the year by the South China Morning Post.

In 2006, Du Yun joined the composition faculty at the State University of New York-Purchase. In 2017, she joined the composition faculty at Peabody Institute of Johns Hopkins University. She is the Professor of Composition at Peabody. In 2017, she was also appointed as the distinguished visiting professor at the Shanghai Conservatory of Music.

From 2014 to 2018, Du Yun was the Artistic Director of the MATA Festival in New York City.

An avid performer, Du Yun's engagements include the 2018 Lahore Biennial (Pakistan), the 2012 Guangzhou Art Triennial (Guangzhou Opera House, China), the National Academy Museum (USA), the inaugural Shanghai Project (China). She also leads her band Ok Miss, which exists as both rock band and chamber music ensemble.

In 2020, China's leading record label, Modern Sky, announced its three-year record deal with Du Yun.

The Vilcek Foundation awarded her the Vilcek Prizes in Music, for recognizing immigrants who have made lasting contributions to American society. Du Yun was awarded top 38 Immigrants by the Carnegie Foundation. In 2023 Du Yun was awarded the Harvard Centennial Medal. This is the highest honor the Harvard Graduate School of Arts and Sciences (GSAS) bestows. She was the youngest recipient of this award’s history. The Centennial Medal acknowledges alumni who have made outstanding contributions to society, the roots of which are based in their graduate education.

Du Yun lives and works from New York City. She uses her whole name, Du Yun, not Du, for professional and personal uses.

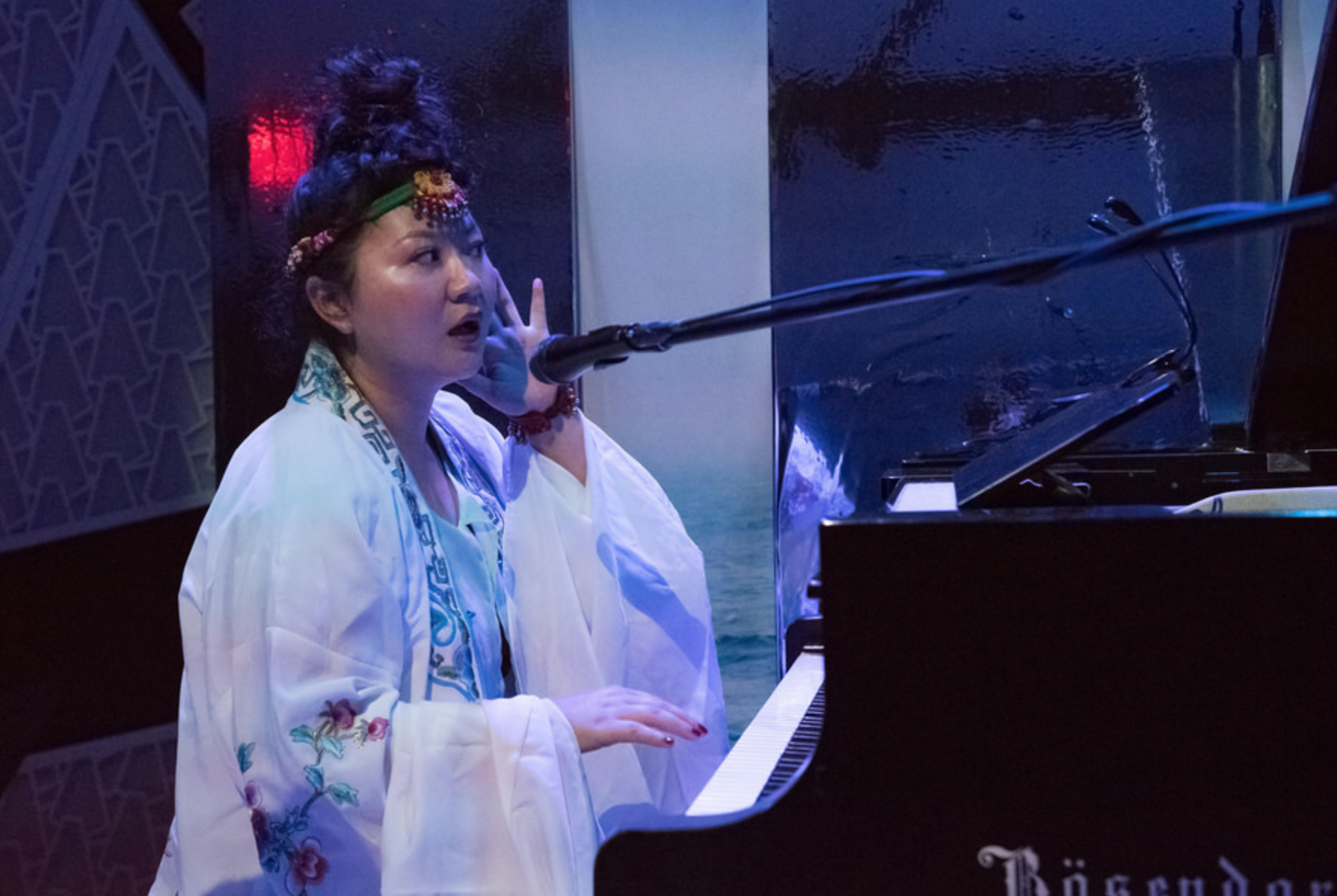
Du Yun at rehearsal

=== Compositions ===
Her works include compositions for solo instruments, electroacoustic music, chamber music, orchestral works, opera, indie pop, punk, theatre, oral tradition music, sound installations, and performance art pieces. Du's works have been performed internationally in venues such as Carnegie Hall, the Guangzhou Opera House, the Salle Pleyel Paris, the Sibelius Academy in Helsinki, Escola de Música do Estado in São Paulo, the Darmstädter Ferienkurse in Germany, and London's Southbank Centre. She has written for the New York Philharmonic, the Seattle Symphony Orchestra, the Detroit Symphony Orchestra, the LA Philharmonic, and the San Francisco Contemporary Music Players, as well as solo artists Hilary Hahn and Matt Haimovitz.

On April 10, 2017, she was awarded the Pulitzer Prize for Music for her second opera, Angel's Bone. The citation for the prize reads: "Premiered on January 6, 2016, at the Prototype Festival, 3LD Arts and Technology Center, New York City, a bold operatic work that integrates vocal and instrumental elements and a wide range of styles into a harrowing allegory for human trafficking in the modern world. Libretto by Royce Vavrek."

She is the composer of the musical Dim Sum Warriors, based on a graphic novel and bilingual iPad app series about Kung Fu-fighting dumplings by the Singaporean filmmaker, satirist, and cartoonist Colin Goh and Yenyen Woo. Dim Sum Warriors was made into a Chinese musical which was produced by Stan Lai. The musical debuted on August 11, 2017, to sold-out audiences at Theatre Above in Shanghai, and went on to tour in 25 major cities in China the following year.

Her work with the Palestinian artist Khaled Jarrrar, "Where We Lost Our Shadows", is based on a trip that Khaled took with a family of Syrian refugee from Greece to Berlin. The work was co-commissioned by Carnegie Hall, London's Southbank Centre, the Kennedy Center, American Composers Orchestra and CalPerformances. Its documentary was on the National Geographic's Human Journey series. The work is for three soloists, orchestra and video.

In 2020, her site-specific opera Sweet Land, co-composed with composer Raven Chacon, premiered in LA with the opera company The Industry, directed by Yuval Sharon and Cannupa Hanska Luger. Sweet Land is a double-team work, with libretto by Aja Couchois and Douglas Kearney. The Los Angeles Times named it a best classical music moment in 2020, a parable of, and fantasia on, manifest destiny. It won the Best 2021 New Opera by The Music Critics Association of North America. The album, released in 2021, was a Notable recording of 2021 by The New Yorker.

Du Yun's concert music is published by G. Schirmer, Inc.

=== Performing artist ===
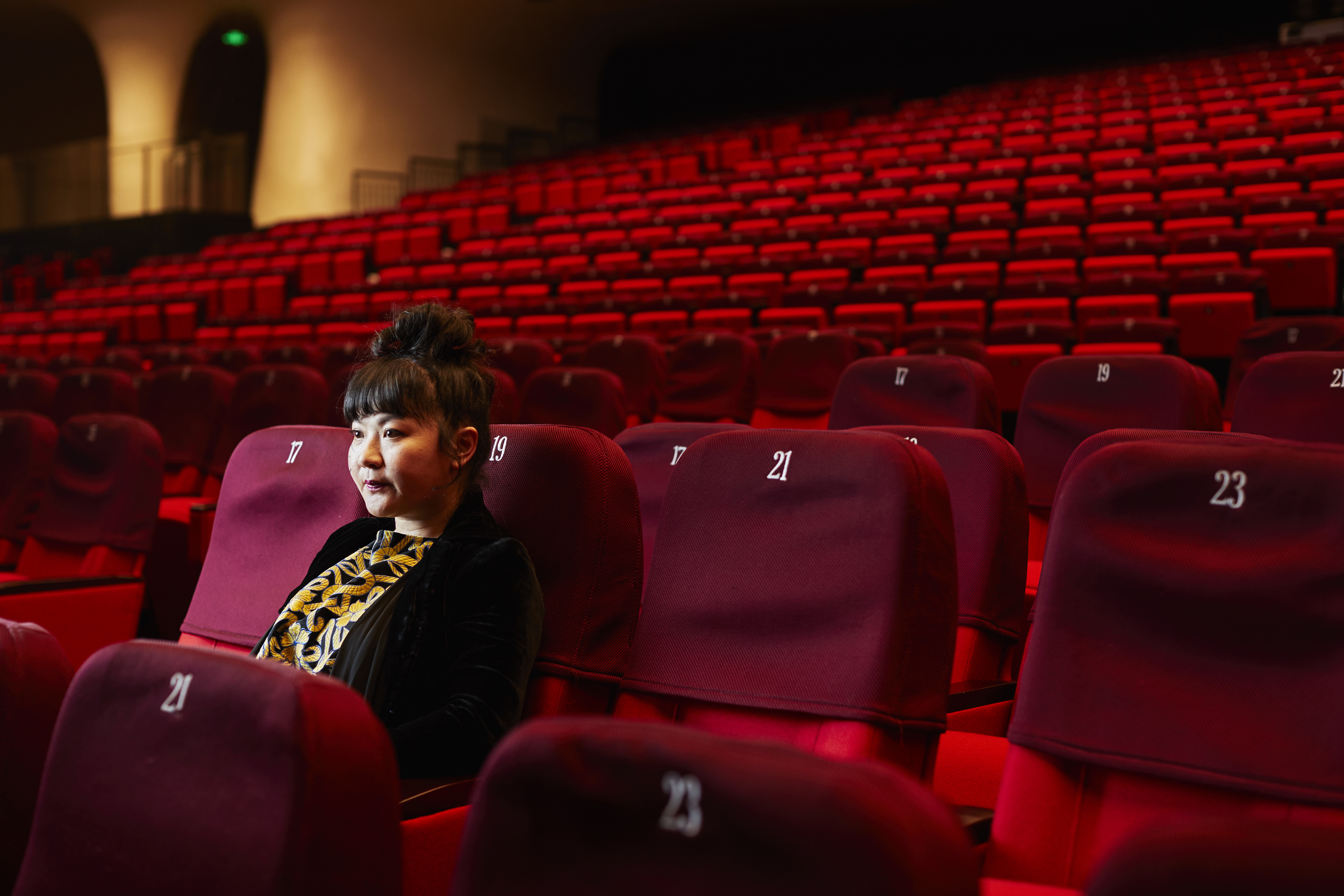
Du Yun at Daguan theatre, at Shanghai Project opening

Du Yun's performing persona on stage has been called "utterly extraordinary, unrestrained performance."

Du Yun leads the band Ok Miss. According to The New Yorker, "the one predictable thing about Du Yun … is her unpredictability. Dig deeper, though, and you can sense the conjoined strands of curiosity and compassion that run through everything she makes. On the first two nights of her Stone residency, her art-pop band, OK Miss, ventures through breathy Chinese pop, seductive trip-hop, and metallic skronk."

=== Visual art ===
Du Yun has done works for the Guangzhou Triennial, The Shanghai Project, Cordoba Contemporary Arts Center, and the Sharjah Biennial.

=== Social work ===
Du Yun is an advocate for women, racial equality and social justice. In an interview with NPR on gender in classical music, she said: "I think this is the issue — larger and deeper than the debate of discrimination at hand. Any sustainable and viable career paths cannot and should not depend on a few people's luck." Speaking to Foreign Policy on art's power in politics, she said: "A lot of times politics, global issues, are very black and white... There is a place for that, but it's also fantastic to have art side by side, from different viewpoints open for interpretations."

Du Yun founded and curated the Pan Asia Sounding Festival at National Sawdust in March 2018, as part of the Spring Revolution. "I want to demystify Asian culture. I want to question who owns the culture and bring together the divisions we have in society," she told the New York News Channel PIX11.

Du Yun started a global initiative, FutureTradition, to advocate oral tradition in music and promote their cross-regional collaborations. The works involve many collaborations across regions. When All About Jazz covered her keynote speech for the European Jazz Conference in 2019, Ian Patterson wrote:

Du highlighted Chinese opera and the Indian raga as examples of art forms whose traditions have been built on cultural and linguistic hybridity—the ever-evolving influence of geography and time. She could just as well have been talking about jazz. Culture, Du intimated, has always been about the embrace of new ideas. It was no contradiction in terms when Du called for both reverence and irreverence towards folk traditions.

== Critical reception ==
The music of Du Yun, who won the Pulitzer Prize for music in 2017, is difficult to classify, including aspects of, to quote her own website, "orchestral [music], opera, chamber music, theatre, cabaret, pop music, oral tradition, visual arts, electronics and noise."

— James Manheim, Allmusic.com

Du Yun is regarded as a "leading force on the New York Scene," and "one of China's leading young composers." Her onstage performing persona has been described as "adventurously eclectic" and "an indie diva with avant garde edge" by The New York Times. She has been selected by NPR as one of the 100 most influential young composers under 40 in 2011. She was named one of the top 35 female composers in classical music by The Washington Post. Her work for Jennifer Koh, Give Me Back My Fingerprints, is listed as Top 25 Classical Music Tracks of 2019 by The New York Times. Her studio albums Angel's Bone, Dinosaur Scar, A Cockroach's Tarantella and Sweet Land are listed as Notable Recordings of The Year in 2017, 2018, 2020, and 2021 respectively, by The New Yorker.

In its decade review, UK's Classical FM listed Du Yun's winning of Pulitzer as No. 6 in "10 ways the 2010s changed classical music forever." Rolling Stone Italia named her as one of the women composers who defined the 2010s.

== Works ==
=== Opera ===
- In Our Daughter's Eyes
- Sweet Land
- Angel's Bone
- Zolle with A Cockroach's Tarantella

=== Orchestral ===
- Slow Portraits
- Kraken
- Mantichora
- Hundred Heads
- Impeccable Quake

=== Soloist(s) and orchestra ===
- Where We Lost Our Shadows (2019)
- Thirst (2018)
- Ears Of The Book Concerto for Pipa and Orchestra (2024)

=== Chamber music ===
- Vicissitudes No. 1
- by of... Lethean
- Your eyes are not your eyes
- Air Glow
- A Few Stops on the N Train
- A Few Stops on the 7 Train
- Tattooed in Snow
- Every Grass A Spring

=== Solo with or without electronics ===
- give me back my fingerprints
- The Veronica
- Run in a Graveyard
- When a Tiger Meets a Rosa Rugosa
- An Empty Garlic
- San
- Dinosaur Scar
- Ixtab, 10pm

=== Performance art ===
- How are you doing, the future that has never left
- How are you doing, the past that comes around the corner
- Run

=== Musical ===
- Dim Sum Warriors (book by Colin Goh)

=== Theatre ===
- Love in a Fallen City, 傾城之戀, 2021 in Mandarin (written by Eileen Chang directed by Timmy Yip 葉錦添 )
- Writing in Water, 水中之書, 2016 in Mandarin (written/dir by Stan Lai 賴聲川)
- Kung Fu (written by David Henry Hwang 黃哲倫)

=== Collaborations with Shahzia Sikander ===
- Disruption as Rapture
- Parallax
- Singing Suns
- The Last Post

== Discography ==
Studio albums

- Sweet Land (2021, Industry Records)
- A Cockroach's Tarantella (2020, Modern Sky)
  Du Yun, JACK Quartet
- Dinosaur Scar (2018, Tundra)
  International Contemporary Ensemble, Du Yun
  Air Glow – Grammy Nomination for Best Classical Contemporary Composition, 2019
- Angel's Bone (2017, VIA Records, label name changed to National Sawdust Tracks in 2017)
  Lead cast: Abigail Fischer, Kyle Pfortmiller, Jennifer Charles, Kyle Bielfield
  The Choir of Trinity Wall Street
  Julian Wachner, conductor
  FA Angel's Bone
- Shark in You (2012, New Focus Recordings), CD, digital and vinyl
- Shark in You

Compilations

- Retrospective (2018, Deutsche Grammophon)
  Hilary Hahn, violin
- Overtures to Bach (2016, Oxingale Records/Pendatone)
  Matt Haimovitz, 'cello
  Juno Award Nomination for Classical Album of the Year, 2017
- Orbit (2015, Oxingale Records/Pendatone)
  Matt Haimovitz, 'cello
- In 27 Pieces: the Hilary Hahn Encores (2013, Deutsche Grammophon)
  Hilary Hahn, violin
  Cory Smythe, piano
  Grammy Award for Best Chamber Music/Small Ensemble Performance, 2014
- Figment (2009, Oxingale Records)
  Matt Haimovitz, 'cello
- Aliento (2009, New Focus Recordings)
  Claire Chase, flute and electronics
- Abandoned Time (2008, New Focus Recordings)
  International Contemporary Ensemble

== Collaborations ==
Notable collaborations include with visual artist Shahzia Sikander, flutist Claire Chase, librettist Royce Vavrek, and pipa player Wu Man.

== Honors and recognitions ==
- 2024: Elected Member of American Academy of Arts and Sciences
- 2023: Centennial Medal, Harvard University
- 2023: Vilcek Prize in Music
- 2022: Creative Capital Award
- 2021: Best 2021 New Opera - Music Critics Association of North America Award for Best New Opera - Sweet Land
- 2021: Asia Society Hong Kong Center – Honoree in Performing Arts
- 2021: American Academy in Berlin – Berlin Prize
- 2021: Foundation for Contemporary Arts – Music/Sound
- 2019: Beijing Music Festival – Artist of the Year
- 2019: BraVo International Professional Music Award – Moscow – Best Classical Composition
- 2018: Great Immigrants – Carnegie Foundation
- 2018: Guggenheim Fellowship
- 2017: Pulitzer Prize for Music – Opera Angel's Bone
- 2017: Asian Cultural Council
- 2016: New York Foundation for the Arts, Sound, fellow
- 2015: Civitella Ranieri Foundation
- 2011: Detroit Symphony Orchestra's Elaine Lebenbom Award
- 2011: Philadelphia Music Project – Pew Charitable Trusts.
- 2009: Rockefeller Foundation – Bellagio
- 2008: Chamber Music America
- 2007: Fromm Music Foundation
