= Meredith Monk =

American composer, director, filmmaker, and choreographer

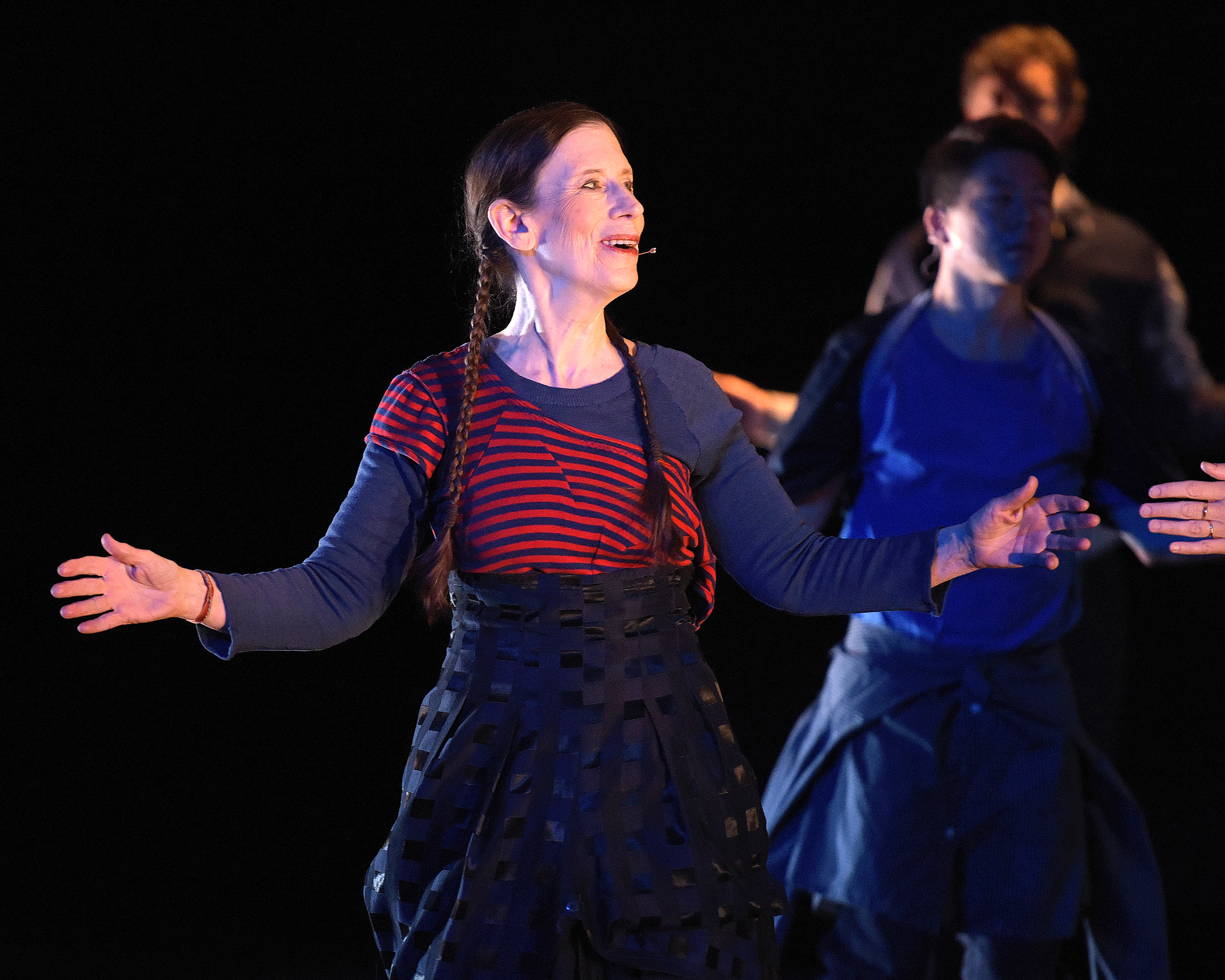
- Monk in 2014

Background information
- Born: Meredith Jane Monk; November 20, 1942 (age 83); New York City, New York, US
- Genre: Avant-garde
- Years active: 1968–present
- Website: meredithmonk.org

Meredith Jane Monk (born November 20, 1942) is an American composer, performer, director, vocalist, filmmaker, and choreographer. From the 1960s onwards, Monk has created multi-disciplinary works which combine music, theatre, and dance, recording extensively for ECM Records. In 1991, Monk composed Atlas, an opera, commissioned and produced by the Houston Grand Opera and the American Music Theater Festival. Her music has been used in films by the Coen Brothers (The Big Lebowski, 1998) and Jean-Luc Godard (Nouvelle Vague, 1990 and Notre musique, 2004). Trip hop musician DJ Shadow sampled Monk's "Dolmen Music" on the song "Midnight in a Perfect World". In 2014, she was awarded a National Medal of Arts.

== Early life ==
Meredith Monk was born to businessman Theodore Glenn Monk (1909–1998) and singer Audrey Lois Monk (née Audrey Lois Zellman; 1911–2009), in New York City, New York. Her mother, a professional singer of popular and classical music known under the stage name of Audrey Marsh, was herself the daughter of a concert pianist of German Jewish background from Philadelphia. Meredith has a sister, Tracy (born 1948). Monk has a bachelor's degree from Sarah Lawrence College, where she studied composition with then-graduate student and Alwin Nikolais dancer Beverly Schmidt Blossom.

At the age of three, Monk was diagnosed with strabismus and her mother signed her up to a Dalcroze eurhythmics programme, a technique which integrates music with movement. Monk says that it "has influenced everything I've done. It's why dance and movement and film are so integral to my music. It's why I see music so visually."

== Career ==
Meredith Monk is primarily known for her vocal innovations, including a wide range of extended techniques, which she first developed in her solo performances prior to forming her own ensemble. In December 1961, she appeared at the Actor's Playhouse in Greenwich Village (NYC) as a solo dancer in an off-Broadway children's musical theater adaptation of Charles Dickens' A Christmas Carol, entitled Scrooge (music and lyrics by Norman Curtis; directed and choreographed by Patricia Taylor Curtis). In 1964, Monk graduated from Sarah Lawrence College after studying with Beverly Schmidt Blossom, and in 1968 she founded The House, a company dedicated to an interdisciplinary approach to performance. Monk's performances have influenced many artists, including Bruce Nauman, whom she met in San Francisco in 1968.

In 1978, Monk formed The Meredith Monk & Vocal Ensemble (modeled after similar ensembles of musical colleagues, such as Steve Reich and Philip Glass), to explore new and wider vocal textures and forms, which often were contrasted with minimal instrumental textures. Monk began a long-standing relationship with the Walker Art Center of Minneapolis, which continues to showcase her work to this day. During this period Monk recorded Dolmen Music (1979), her first album released on Manfred Eicher's record label ECM, in 1981.

In the 1980s, Monk wrote and directed two films, Ellis Island (1981), and Book of Days (1988). These developed from her idea: "One day during summer of 1984, as I was sweeping the floor of my house in the country, the image of a young girl (in black and white) and a medieval street in the Jewish community (also in black and white) came to me." Monk tells this account in the liner notes of the ECM-recording. Apart from the film, different versions exist of this piece. Two are for the concert hall, and an album, produced by Meredith Monk and Manfred Eicher, is "a film for the ears."

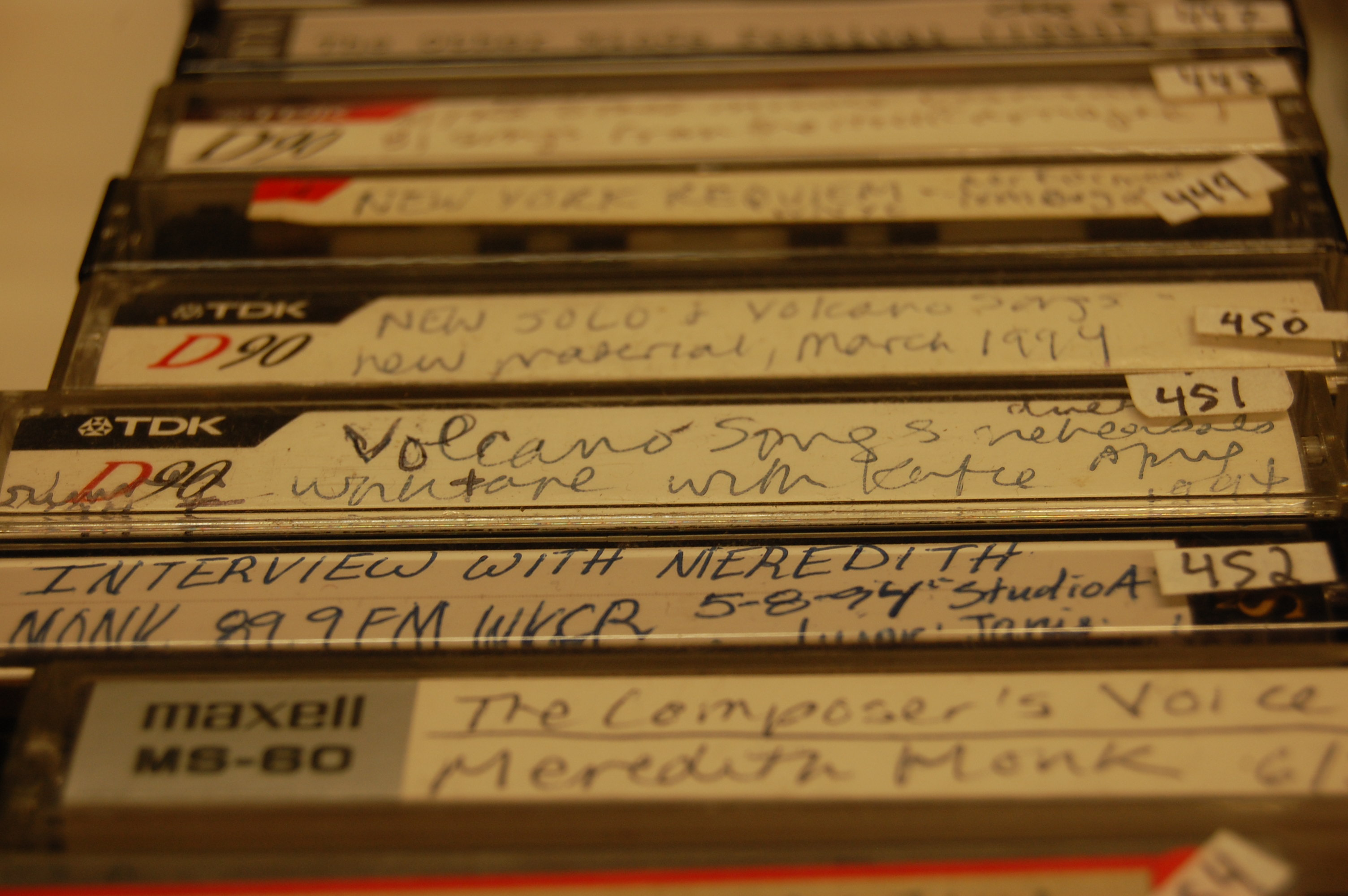
Cassettes of various Meredith Monk performances

In the early 1990s, Monk composed an opera called Atlas, which premiered in Houston, Texas, in 1991. She has also written pieces for instrumental ensembles and symphony orchestras. Her first symphonic work was Possible Sky (2003). It was followed by Stringsongs (2004) for string quartet, which was commissioned by the Kronos Quartet. In 2005, events were held all over the world in celebration of the 40th anniversary of her career, including a concert in Carnegie Hall featuring Björk, Terry Riley, DJ Spooky (who sampled Monk on his album Drums of Death), Ursula Oppens, Bruce Brubaker, John Zorn, and the new music ensembles Alarm Will Sound and Bang on a Can All-Stars, along with the Pacific Mozart Ensemble. Meredith Monk has been composer in residence for Carnegie Hall, concluding in 2015.

In an interview, Monk said that her favourite music includes Brazilian music, especially Caetano Veloso's recordings, the music by Mildred Bailey ("the great jazz singer from the ‘30s and ‘40s"), and Bartók's cycle for piano Mikrokosmos.

== Honors and legacy ==
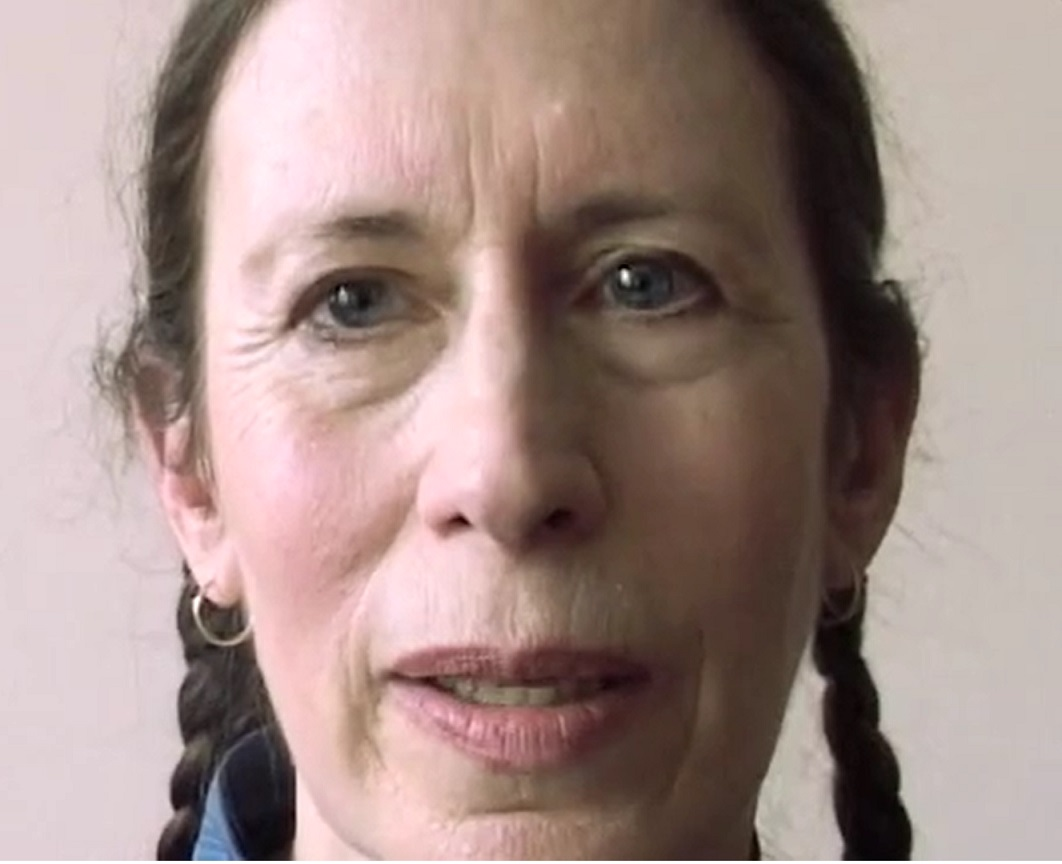
Meredith Monk in Speaking portraits

Monk has won numerous awards, including a MacArthur Fellowship and the Creative Capital Award in the discipline of Performing Arts. She has also been a MacDowell Fellow six times (1987, 1988, 1994, 1996, 2001, Winter 2007). She has been awarded honorary Doctor of Arts degrees from Bard College, the University of the Arts (Philadelphia), the Juilliard School, the San Francisco Art Institute and the Boston Conservatory. In 1979, the Supersisters trading card set was produced and distributed; one of the cards featured Monk's name and picture. In 1985, Monk won an Obie Award for Sustained Excellence for her contributions to the off-Broadway community.

In 2007, she received in Italy the Demetrio Stratos International Award for musical experimentation. On September 10, 2015, US President Barack Obama presented Monk with a National Medal of Arts, the highest honor in the United States specifically given for achievement in the arts. Monk was given The Dorothy and Lillian Gish Prize in 2017.

Her music was used in films by David Byrne (True Stories, 1986), the Coen Brothers (The Big Lebowski, 1998), Jean-Luc Godard (Nouvelle Vague, 1990 and Notre musique, 2004), and in The Rapture (1991). Hip hop artist DJ Shadow sampled "Dolmen Music" on the song "Midnight in a Perfect World" (Endtroducing....., 1995). French singer Camille paid an explicit homage to Meredith in her song "The Monk" (Music Hole, 2008) which in its construction also evoked Monk's work. In 2014, her music was also featured in the HBO series True Detective.

The House Foundation for the Arts, Inc. (est. 1971) is a Manhattan-based nonprofit organization that preserves and disseminates the work of Meredith Monk and her ensemble.

== Personal life ==
Monk has practiced Buddhism formally since 1985, which heavily influences her art, emphasizing mindfulness, interconnection, and presence. She has lived in the same fifth-floor loft in Manhattan's Tribeca neighborhood since 1972. Her partners have included Ping Chong and Mieke van Hoek (1946–2002).

== Works ==
=== Instrumental works ===
- Plainsong for Bill's Bojo electric organ (1971)
- Paris for solo piano (1972)
- Ellis Island for two pianos (1986)
- Window in 7's for solo piano (1986)
- Parlour Games for two pianos (1988)
- Phantom Waltz for two pianos (1990)
- St. Petersburg Waltz for solo piano (1994)
- Steppe Music for solo piano (1997)
- Clarinet Study #4, for solo clarinet (1999)
- Cello Study #1 for solo cello and voice (1999)
- Trumpet Study #1 for solo trumpet (1999)
- Possible Sky for orchestra and voices (commissioned by Michael Tilson Thomas for the New World Symphony, 2003)
- Stringsongs for string quartet (commissioned by the Kronos Quartet, 2004)

=== Vocal works ===
- 16 Millimeter Earrings for voice, guitar and tapes (1966)
- Blueprint: Overload/Blueprint 2 for solo voice, echoplex and tape (1967)
- Dying Swan with Sunglasses (1967)
- Blueprint (3), (4) (1968)
- Co-op (1968)
- Juice: A Theater Cantata for 85 voices, Jew's harp and two violins (1969)
- Needle-Brain Lloyd and the Systems Kid for 150 voices, electric organ, guitar and flute (1970)
- Vessel: An Opera Epic for 75 voices, electronic organ, dulcimer and accordion (1971)
- Paris for piano, unaccompanied vocal duo (1972)
- Our Lady of Late for solo voice and wine glass (1972)
- Education of the Girlchild: an Opera for 6 voices, electric organ and piano (1972–73)
- Chacon for 25 voices, piano and percussion (1974)
- Anthology and Small Scroll for solo voice, piano and soprano recorder (1975)
- Venice/Milan for 15 voices and piano four hands (1976)
- Quarry: An Opera for 38 voices, 2 pump organs, 2 soprano recorders, tape (1976)
- Songs from the Hill for unaccompanied solo voice (1976)
- Tablet for 4 voices, piano four hands, 2 soprano recorders (1976)
- The Plateau Series for 5 voices and tape (1977)
- Recent Ruins for 14 voices, piano and 2 electric organs (1979)
- Dolmen Music for 6 voices, cello, percussion (1979)
- Turtle Dreams (Waltz) for 4 voices and 2 electric organs (1980)
- Specimen Days for 14 voices, piano and 2 electric organs (1981)
- View No. 2 for solo voice and piano (1982)
- Tokyo Cha-Cha for 6 voices and 2 electric organs (1983)
- 2 Men Walking for 3 voices and electric organs (1983)
- The Games for 16 voices, synthesizer, keyboards, Flemish bagpipes, bagpipes, Chinese horn and rauschpfeife (1983)
- Astronaut Anthem for chorus a cappella (1983)
- Panda Chant I for 4 voices (1984)
- Panda Chant II for 8 voices (1984)
- Graduation Song for 16 voices (1984)
- City Songs (1984)
- Book of Days for 25 voices, synthesizer, piano or 7 voices, synthesizer (Chamber Version) (1985) recorded for ECM
- Scared Song song for solo voice, synthesizer and piano (1986)
- I Don't Know song for solo voice and piano (1986)
- Double Fiesta solo voice and 2 pianos (1986)
- String unaccompanied solo voice (1986)
- Duet Behavior for 2 voices (1987)
- The Ringing Place for 9 voices (1987)
- Cat Song for solo voice (1988)
- Processional for solo piano and voice (1988)
- Light Songs for solo voice (1988)
- Fayum Music for voice, hammered dulcimer, double ocarina (1988)
- Book of Days (film score) for 10 voices, cello, shawm, synthesizer, hammered dulcimer, bagpipe and hurdy-gurdy (1988)
- Atlas: An Opera in Three Parts for 18 voices 2 keyboards, clarinet, bass clarinet, sheng, bamboo sax, 2 violins, viola, 2 cellos, French horn, percussion, shawm (1991)
- Three Heavens and Hells for 4 voices (1992)
- Volcano Songs (Duet) for 2 voices (1993)
- St. Petersburg Waltz for solo piano and 2 voices (1993)
- New York Requiem for solo voice and piano (1993)
- Volcano Songs (Solo) for solo voice, voice with taped voices and piano (1994)
- American Archaeology #1: Roosevelt Island for 9 voices, organ, bass, medieval drum and shawm (1994)
- Star Trek: Envoy for composing/directing/performing in the Den-Kai/Krikiki Ensemble (1995)
- Nightfall for 16 voices (1995)
- The Politics of Quiet for 10 voices, 2 keyboards, horn, violin, bowed psaltery (1996)
- Magic Frequencies for 6 voices, 2 keyboards, percussion, theremin and violin (1998)
- Cello Study #1 solo cello and voice (1999)
- Eclipse Variations for 4 voices, esraj, sampler, recorded in surround sound, commissioned by Starkland (2000)
- Micki Suite for 4 voices (2000)
- mercy for 7 voices, 2 keyboards, percussion, multiple woodwinds, violin (2001)
- When There Were Work Songs for vocal ensemble (2002, commissioned by the Western Wind Vocal Ensemble)
- Last Song for solo voice and piano (2003)
- impermanence (part 1) for 8 voices, piano, keyboard, marimba, vibraphone, percussion, violin, multiple woodwinds, bicycle wheel (2004)
- Night for 8 voices, bowed psaltry, chamber orchestra (1996/2005)
- impermanence (part 2) for 8 voices, piano, keyboard, marimba, vibraphone, percussion, violin, woodwinds and bicycle wheel (2006)
- Songs of Ascension for vocal ensemble, woodwinds, percussion, shrutis and string quartet (2006, commissioned by the Kronos Quartet, with Ann Hamilton)
- Basket Rondo for 6 voices (2007), commissioned by the Western Wind Vocal Ensemble
- Weave for solo voices, chorus and orchestra (2010, commissioned by Grand Center Inc and the Los Angeles Master Chorale)
- Quilting for 9 voices (2011)
- On Behalf of Nature for 8 voices, violin, keyboards, French horn, clarinet, bass and contrabass clarinet, wooden flutes, vibraphone, marimba and percussion (2013)

== Discography ==
- Key (Increase Records, 1971 / Lovely Music, 1977 and 1995)
- Our Lady of Late (Minona Records, 1973 / wergo, 1986)
- Songs from the Hill/Tablet (wergo, 1979)
- Dolmen Music (ECM, 1981)
- Turtle Dreams (ECM, 1983)
- Do You Be (ECM, 1987)
- Book of Days (ECM, 1990)
- Facing North (ECM, 1992)
- Atlas: An Opera in Three Parts (ECM, 1993)
- Volcano Songs (ECM, 1997)
- Mercy (ECM, 2002)
- Impermanence (ECM, 2008)
- Beginnings (Tzadik, 2009), compositions from 1966 to 1980
- Songs of Ascension (ECM, 2011)
- Piano Songs (ECM, 2014)
- On Behalf Of Nature (ECM, 2016)
- Memory Game (Cantaloupe, 2020)
- Cellular Songs (ECM, 2025)

== Films ==
- 1981 — Ellis Island. Conceived and directed by Meredith Monk; produced and co-directed by Bob Rosen; cinematography by Jerry Pantzer.
- 1983 — Turtle Dreams. Public access film.
- 1989 — Book of Days. Director and co-writer with Tone Blevins.
- 1993 — The Sensual Nature of Sound: 4 Composers – Laurie Anderson, Tania León, Meredith Monk, Pauline Oliveros. Directed by Michael Blackwood.
- 1983 — Four American Composers "Meredith Monk". Directed by Peter Greenaway.
- 1996 — Speaking of Dance: Conversations With Contemporary Masters of American Modern Dance. No. 22: Meredith Monk. American Dance Festival. Directed by Douglas Rosenberg.
- 2009 — Meredith Monk: Inner Voice. Directed by Babeth Mondini-VanLoo.
- 2020 — ECM50 | 1981 – Meredith Monk: "Dolmen Music", documentary about Meredith Monk's work for ECM Records. Directed by Ingo J. Biermann.
- 2025 — Monk in Pieces, a documentary film. Directed by Billy Shebar.
