= Sweet Land (opera) =

Opera by Raven Chacon and Du Yun

Sweet Land is an English-language opera by the Los Angeles based opera company The Industry Opera.

== Background ==
The music was composed by Raven Chacon and Du Yun. The poet Douglas Kearney was the librettist for Chacon's parts of the music, and the poet Aja Couchois Duncan wrote the libretto for Yun's sections. It was described by the Los Angeles Times as an 'opera of pairs'.

== Performance history ==
The opera premiered in February 2020 in Los Angeles State Historic Park. The performances took place in and around purpose built, temporary open-air structures, and occurred both at dusk and in the dark (beginning at 6:30pm or 9:00pm respectively). Audience members walked to the different parts of the set. Parts of the opera were performed simultaneously in different locations, meaning that the entire opera could not be seen by any individual audience member in a single performance.

== Summary and themes ==
The main theme of the opera is colonialism. Native Americans are represented by the 'Hosts' and colonists as the 'Arrivals'. The Hosts initially welcome the Arrivals, but the Arrivals despoil the land in the name of progress and Manifest Destiny.

In the program, composer Raven Chacon states: "It’s not an opera about Pilgrims and Indians. That was just the cover of the book to get some of you audience in the door”.
