= Hopscotch (opera) =

2015 opera created by The Industry Opera

- Language: English
- Premiere: October 2015; Los Angeles

Hopscotch is an experimental opera created by The Industry Opera. It premiered in Los Angeles in October 2015, when it was performed in 24 cars driven throughout the city. Its story takes inspiration from the Orpheus myth.

== Performance history ==
In the 2015 performances in Los Angeles, audience members were simultaneously driven between locations in several limousines. Locations included Chinatown Central Plaza and the steps of City Hall.

Significant parts of the opera were staged within the limousines themselves, where audience members were joined by various musicians.

External videos
- On an episode of KCET's Artbound
