= Marnie Breckenridge =

American opera singer

Marnie Breckenridge (born September 24, 1982) is an American singer. She is a soprano performing opera, classical music, cross-over, operetta, and classical sacred music.

She graduated from Pacific Union College in Angwin, overlooking the Napa Valley, with a bachelor's degree in music in 1993. She went on to get a Master of Music degree from the San Francisco Conservatory of Music.

Celebrated for her roles in contemporary opera, she originated the role of Mother in David T. Little and Royce Vavrek's Dog Days in 2012. In 2020, she was awarded the Dora Mavor Moore Award for Outstanding Performance by an Individual in the operatic field for her performance as Jacqueline du Pré in Luna Pearl Woolf and Royce Vavrek's world premiere presentation of Jacqueline presented by Tapestry Opera.

== Notable World Premieres ==
- Dog Days (2012, David T. Little, composer; Royce Vavrek, librettist)
- Today it Rains (2019, Laura Kaminsky, composer; Mark Campbell and Kimberly Reid, librettists)
- Jacqueline (2020, Luna Pearl Woolf, composer; Royce Vavrek, librettist)
