= Timur Bekbosunov =

Kazakh-American opera singer

- Born: 1983 (age 42–43); Almaty, Kazakh SSR, Soviet Union
- Occupations: Opera singer, film producer
- Years active: 2008–present
- Website: www.theoperaoftimur.com

Timur Bekbosunov (born 1983) is a Kazakh-American opera singer based in Los Angeles. He has performed traditional and avant-garde music with the Los Angeles Philharmonic, National Theatre (Prague), Accademia Nazionale di Santa Cecilia, and orchestras around the world since 2008, including many world premieres of new operas. He was nominated in the 66th Annual Grammy Awards for a Grammy Award for Best Opera Recording as a lead vocalist in the opera Black Lodge.

The performer, which the Los Angeles Times dubbed one of “one of Los Angeles’ most distinctive singers”, studied at California Institute of the Arts and USC and is currently the lead vocalist of the glam-opera band, Timur and the Dime Museum. Bekbosunov has also worked as a film producer including the 2019 drama Clemency (film), which won the Sundance Grand Jury Prize.

== Opera career ==
Timur performed as a soloist with the Los Angeles Philharmonic, Los Angeles Opera, National Theatre (Prague),Accademia Nazionale di Santa Cecilia, Prototype Festival, Grand Théâtre de Genève, REDCAT, Opera Philadelphia, Hawaii Opera Theater, Bard SummerScape, BAM Next Wave Festival, O. Festival, Théâtre de l'Athénée, Public Theater Joe's Pub, Bang on a Can All-Stars and Hollywood Bowl.

Timur has performed world premieres of new opera works around the world. He has collaborated on premieres of new works by David T. Little (Black Lodge), Jiří Trtík (Kafka's Letter to His Father), Anne LeBaron (Crescent City, Silent Steppe Cantata), Thomas Adès (Powder Her Face, Switzerland premiere), David Lang (composer) (Anatomy Theater), Michael Gordon (composer) (Acquanetta), Mohammed Fairouz and Wayne Koestenbaum (Pierrot), Sylvano Bussotti (Silvano Sylvano), Louis Andriessen (Theater of the World), Evan Ziporyn (Oedipus, A House in Bali), Veronika Krausas (Hopscotch (opera)), Gerald Barry (The Importance of Being Earnest (opera) (Switzerland premiere), Peter Eötvös (Der goldene Drache) (Switzerland premiere), Orango (Shostakovich), Tobias Picker (An American Tragedy (opera) (West Coast premiere), György Ligeti (Le Grand Macabre, (Budapest premiere).

Timur Bekbosunov appeared with American band DeVotchKa and Nick Urata at El Rey Theatre, Troubadour, “In the Shadow of Stalin” Festival at Walt Disney Concert Hall and Red Rocks Amphitheatre with Colorado Symphony Orchestra, Amanda Palmer and Jherek Bishoff.

== Band career ==
Timur and the Dime Museum is a glam-opera LA band formed in 2010. Band members are Timur Bekbosunov, David Tranchina, Daniel Corral, Andrew Lessman and Matthew Setzer.

The band appeared on America's Got Talent Season 5 with a cover of "Total Eclipse" by Kristian Hoffman, a songwriter for Klaus Nomi. The band debuted live on the ALOUD series as part of the Los Angeles Public Library Foundation billed as "operatic vaudeville with a bohemian attitude."

Timur and the Dime Museum have performed with DeVotchKa, Tiger Lillies, Kristian Hoffman, Prince Poppycock, Ann Magnuson, Dorian Wood, Mucca Pazza, The Red Paintings. They were featured at the REDCAT Gala with Jack Black, Prototype Festival at HERE Arts Center, Public Theater Joe's Pub. Since 2014, Timur and the Dime Museum mostly focused on theater projects, including a puppet opera “Zoophilic Follies” by Daniel Corral with Dorian Wood at REDCAT's NOW Festival, a multimedia opera “Crescent City” by Anne LeBaron with The Industry Opera, a rock-opera “Collapse” by Daniel Corral at BAM Next Wave Festival, and an industrial metal opera “Black Lodge” by David T. Little at Opera Philadelphia in 2022.

== Solo projects ==
=== "Black Lodge" ===
World premiere took place on October 1, 2022, at Opera Philadelphia as part of Festival O22 and the Philadelphia Fringe Festival. Drawing on the mythologies of the surrealist writer William S. Burroughs author of Naked Lunch, Black Lodge is a metal opera that uses dance, rock band, string quartet, and opera. Composed by Grammy-nominated David T. Little with libretto by Beat Generation poet Anne Waldman, Black Lodge is a “nonlinear and hallucinatory...occurring in that nightmarish place between death and rebirth” and performed as a film screening and an industrial rock opera concert. Thurston Moore of Sonic Youth said Black Lodge is "ripping through the fabric of future vision psychosis where the integrity of classic form clasps the hands of radical possibilities.” The opera film is directed by Michael Joseph McQuilken. The Wall Street Journal describes vocals sounding "alternately like a baroque countertenor, a baritone, a rocker and a crooner.” Black Lodge was nominated in the 66th Annual Grammy Awards for a Grammy Award for Best Opera Recording. Black Lodge is a winner of the 2023 Music Theater Now Competition.

=== "The Great Soviet Bucket" ===
World premiere took place on February 22, 2024, in Miami, Florida. The play is a dark musical comedy that "explores the phenomenon of mass brainwashing.” Co-commissioned by Miami Light Project and Beth Morrison Projects with support from the National Performance Network, created by Timur Bekbosunov, produced by Beth Morrison, directed by Emmy Award-nominated Sandra Powers, the play uses a puppet Comrade Bucket and the Soviet songs to ask questions about the forces of identity and politics. The show is performed by Timur Bekbosunov, pianist Matt Podd and violinist Yvette Cornelia Holzwarth.

=== "Klaus from Space" ===
World premiere took place on June 1, 2021, at the Klanggg Festival presented by NOF with electronic artist Grégoire Pasquier aka Shuttle at Nouveau Monde, Switzerland. The show is a sci-fi cabaret inspired by the cult icon Klaus Nomi. The Netherlands premiere took place at O. Festival 2023 at TR Schouwburg Theater Rotterdam, with guitarist and electronic artist Matthew Setzer of Skinny Puppy, bringing together Klaus Nomi's greatest hits and a world premiere of a ballad by Kristian Hoffman, the curator of the show.

=== “Collapse” ===
World-premiere of Collapse, a multimedia glam-rock meets classical baroque requiem about environmental destruction, took place on March 27, 2014, at REDCAT Theater in Los Angeles. The rock opera is composed by Daniel Corral, produced by Beth Morrison Projects, with performances at BAM Next Wave Festival, Miami Light Project and Operadagen Rotterdam Festival 2015 O. Festival. Interactive video projections were designed by Jesse Gilbert with costumes by the fashion designer Victor Wilde of the Bohemian Society.

== Film career ==
Timur Bekbosunov is a film producer of Clemency, a 2019 US Dramatic Sundance Grand Jury Prize winner and 35th Independent Spirit Awards Best Feature category nominated drama starring Alfre Woodard, Richard Schiff, Wendell Pierce, directed by Chinonye Chukwu, with music by Kathryn Bostic, released on Milan Records. The film was distributed by Neon and Focus Features. He is a producer of the 2019 Sundance Film Festival-selected Blush, a dark comedy directed by Independent Spirit Award winner Debra Eisenstadt, starring Wendi McLendon-Covey, Catherine Curtin, Max Burkholder and Christine Woods. He is a producer of Measure of Revenge, a psychological thriller that stars Oscar-winner Melissa Leo and Bella Thorne, acquired by Vertical Entertainment.

As Executive Producer, Timur Bekbosunov produced Color Out of Space directed by Richard Stanley, starring Nicolas Cage, Tommy Chong, Madeleine Arthur, Joely Richardson, distributed by RLJE Films; psychological horror Daniel Isn't Real, directed by Adam Egypt Mortimer, starring Miles Robbins, Patrick Schwarzenegger, Sasha Lane, Hannah Marks; a drama-fantasy Come Away, directed by Oscar-winner Brenda Chapman and starring Angelina Jolie, David Oyelowo, Michael Caine, Derek Jacobi.

== Personal life ==
Born in Kazakhstan, Timur was adopted by an American mother from Wichita, Kansas. He attended University of Southern California and California Institute of the Arts.

== Discography ==
Year	Title	Notes	Role
2010	The Collection: Songs from the Operatic Underworld	The songs composed by Daniel Corral, Screamin’ Jay Hawkins, Kristian Hoffman, David Bowie and Trent Reznor. Released by Timur and the Dime Museum on Art of Opera Foundation.	Lead vocals
2012	Orango (Shostakovich)	Composed by Dmitri Shostakovich. Released on Deutsche Grammophon, with Los Angeles Philharmonic conducted by Esa-Pekka Salonen.	Paul Mâche, French Journalist
2012	Zoophilic Follies	Composed by Daniel Corral. Released on SpinalFrog with Timur and the Dime Museum, Dorian Wood, Abby Travis and Maesa Pullman.	Daedalus
2013	X-ray Sunsets	Songs by Daniel Corral, Isaac Schankler. Recorded by Timur and the Dime Museum. Self-released.	Lead Vocals
2014	Crescent City	Composed by Anne LeBaron and libretto by Douglas Kearney. Released on Innova Recordings with The Industry Opera.	Deadly Belle
2016	Collapse	Composed by Daniel Corral. Released by Timur and the Dime Museum.	Lead Vocals
2017	Theatre of the World	Composed by Louis Andriessen. Released on Nonesuch Records, conducted by Reinbert de Leeuw with the Los Angeles Philharmonic.	Voltaire
2018	Young Caesar (opera)	Composed by Lou Harrison. Released on The Industry Opera Records, conducted by Marc Lowenstein with Los Angeles Philharmonic New Music Group.	Dionysus
2018	Naked Revolution	Composed by David Sulzer under the stage name Dave Soldier with conceptual artists Komar and Melamid. Released on Mulatta Records, conducted by Richard Auldon Clark with Manhattan Chamber Orchestra.	Alexander Ulyanov, Civilian George Washington
2019	Acquanetta	Composed by Michael Gordon (composer). Released on Cantaloupe Music with Bang on a Can Opera Ensemble.	Doctor
2019	Anatomy Theater	Composed by David Lang. Released on Cantaloupe Music, conducted by Christopher Rountree with International Contemporary Ensemble.	Ambrose Strang, Young Assistant
2019	UKSUS	Composed by Erling Wold. Released on MinMax.	Pushkin
2023	BLACK LODGE	Composed by David T. Little with lyrics by Anne Waldman. Released on Cantaloupe Music. Produced by Beth Morrison and Thurston Moore. Nominated for a Grammy Award for Best Opera Recording in 2023.	Writer

== Additional Recordings ==
- A Mad & Faithful Telling (2008), DeVotchKa on Anti- (record label).
- Ruby Sparks (2012), DeVotchKa's Nick Urata on Milan Records.
