= Beth Morrison =

American producer of contemporary opera

Beth Morrison is an American producer of contemporary opera.

Morrison is known for her collaborations with many artists through her company Beth Morrison Projects includes composers David T. Little, Missy Mazzoli, Du Yun, Paola Prestini, Kamala Sankaram, Darcy James Argue, and David Lang, librettist Royce Vavrek, and performers Lauren Worsham, Abigail Fischer, Nathan Gunn, and Courtney Love. With Kim Whitener and Kristin Marting of HERE Arts Center, she created PROTOTYPE Festival, an annual festival of premier opera-theatre and music-theatre by pioneering artists from New York City and around the world.

== Select opera and music-theatre works produced by Beth Morrison ==
- Soldier Songs (2008, David T. Little, composer and librettist)
- Song from the Uproar: The Lives and Deaths of Isabelle Eberhardt (2012, Missy Mazzoli, composer; Mazzoli and Royce Vavrek, librettists)
- Dog Days (2012, David T. Little, composer; Royce Vavrek, librettist)
- Thumbprint (2014, Kamala Sankaram, composer; Susan Yankowitz, librettist)
- The Source (2014, Ted Hearne, composer; Mark Doten, librettist)
- Kansas City Choir Boy (2015, Todd Almond, composer and librettist)
- Anatomy Theater (2016, David Lang composer; Lang and Mark Dion, librettists)
- Angel's Bone (2016, Du Yun, composer; Royce Vavrek, librettist)
- Aging Magician (2016, Paola Prestini composer, co-created by Prestini, Rinde Eckert and Julian Crouch)
- Breaking the Waves (2016, Missy Mazzoli, composer; Royce Vavrek, librettist)
- p r i s m (2019, Ellen Reid, composer; Roxie Perkins, librettist)

== Concert works ==
- 21c Liederabend (2009, 2011, 2013, 2016)
  - A Few Stops on the N Train (2011, Du Yun, composer and lyricist)
  - Albert, Bound or Unbound (2013, Marie Incontrera, composer; Royce Vavrek, librettist)
- Brooklyn Village (2012)
  - Home (2012) (Sarah Kirkland Snider, composer; Nathaniel Bellows, lyricist)
  - Canvas (2012) (Matthew Mehlan, composer; Royce Vavrek, lyricist)
  - Am I Born (2012) (David T. Little, composer; Royce Vavrek, librettist)
- The Hubble Cantata (2016, Paola Prestini, composer; Royce Vavrek, librettist)
