= List of bioinformatics institutions =

This is a list of major bioinformatics institutions.

- National Center for Biotechnology Information (NCBI)
- European Bioinformatics Institute (EMBL-EBI)
- Australia Bioinformatics Resource (EMBL-ABR)
- Swiss Institute of Bioinformatics (SIB)
- Scripps Research Institute (TSRI)
- European Molecular Biology Laboratory (EMBL)
- Wellcome Trust Sanger Institute (WTSI)
- Computational Biology Department
- Broad Institute
- Whitehead Institute
- The Institute for Genomic Research
- Center for Biomolecular Science and Engineering
- Netherlands Bioinformatics Centre
- COSBI
- Institute of Bioinformatics (IOB)
- Max Planck Institute for Molecular Cell Biology and Genetics (MPI-CBG)
- Partner Institute for Computational Biology
- Flatiron Institute
- DDBJ Center (DDBJ)
- Bioinformatics Institute (Singapore)
- Database Center for Life Science (DBCLS)
