= Dog days =

Hottest part of summer in the Northern Hemisphere

The dog days or dog days of summer are the hot, sultry days of summer. They were historically the period following the heliacal rising of the star system Sirius (known colloquially as the "Dog Star"), which Hellenistic astrology connected with heat, drought, sudden thunderstorms, lethargy, fever, mad dogs, and bad luck. They are now taken to be the hottest, most uncomfortable part of summer in the Northern Hemisphere.

== Etymology ==
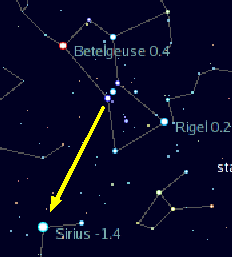
In addition to following Orion into the night sky, the Dog Star Sirius can be easily located in the heavens by following the line created by the prominent asterism Orion's Belt.

The English name is a calque of the Latin dies caniculares (lit. 'the puppy days'), itself a calque of the ancient Greek κυνάδες ἡμέραι (kynádes hēmérai). The Greeks knew the star α Canis Majoris by several names, including Sirius "Scorcher" (Σείριος, Seírios), Sothis (Σῶθις, Sôthis, a transcription of Egyptian Spdt), and the Dog Star (Κῠ́ων, Kúōn). The last name reflects the way Sirius follows the constellation Orion into the night sky.

In Swedish, the dog days are called rötmånaden and mätäkuu in Finnish. Both names mean "rot month". The names stem from the fact that food spoils easily when left out in the heat, and wounds are more likely to get infected and secrete pus during the warm summer months.

== History ==
Sirius is by far the brightest proper star in the night sky, which caused ancient astronomers to take note of it around the world. In Egypt, its return to the night sky became known as a precursor to the annual flooding of the Nile and was worshipped as the goddess Sopdet. In Greece, it became known as the precursor of the unpleasantly hot phase of the summer. Greek poets even recorded the belief that the return of the bright star was responsible for bringing heat and fever with it; it was also associated with sudden thunderstorms. In Homer's Iliad, probably composed in the 8th century BC but representing an earlier tradition, Achilles's approach toward Troy, where he would slay Hector, is illustrated through an extended metaphor about the baleful effects attending the return of Sirius:

τὸν δ᾽ ὃ γέρων Πρίαμος πρῶτος ἴδεν ὀφθαλμοῖσι
παμφαίνονθ᾽ ὥς τ᾽ ἀστέρ᾽ ἐπεσσύμενον πεδίοιο,
ὅς ῥά τ᾽ ὀπώρης εἶσιν, ἀρίζηλοι δέ οἱ αὐγαὶ
φαίνονται πολλοῖσι μετ᾽ ἀστράσι νυκτὸς ἀμολγῷ,
ὅν τε κύν᾽ Ὠρίωνος ἐπίκλησιν καλέουσι.
λαμπρότατος μὲν ὅ γ᾽ ἐστί, κακὸν δέ τε σῆμα τέτυκται,
καί τε φέρει πολλὸν πυρετὸν δειλοῖσι βροτοῖσιν:
ὣς τοῦ χαλκὸς ἔλαμπε περὶ στήθεσσι θέοντος.

Translation:

Priam saw him first, with his old man's eyes,
A single point of light on Troy's dusty plain.
Sirius rises late in the dark, liquid sky
On summer nights, star of stars,
Orion's Dog they call it, brightest
Of all, but an evil portent, bringing heat
And fevers to suffering humanity.
Achilles' bronze gleamed like this as he ran.

The rising of Sirius during this period has been calculated as 19 July (Julian). Writing about the same time, Hesiod considered the worst and hottest part of the summer to be the days before Sirius returned to the night sky. During this period, Sirius was invisible from the earth but it was apparently understood to still be in the sky, augmenting the power of the sun:

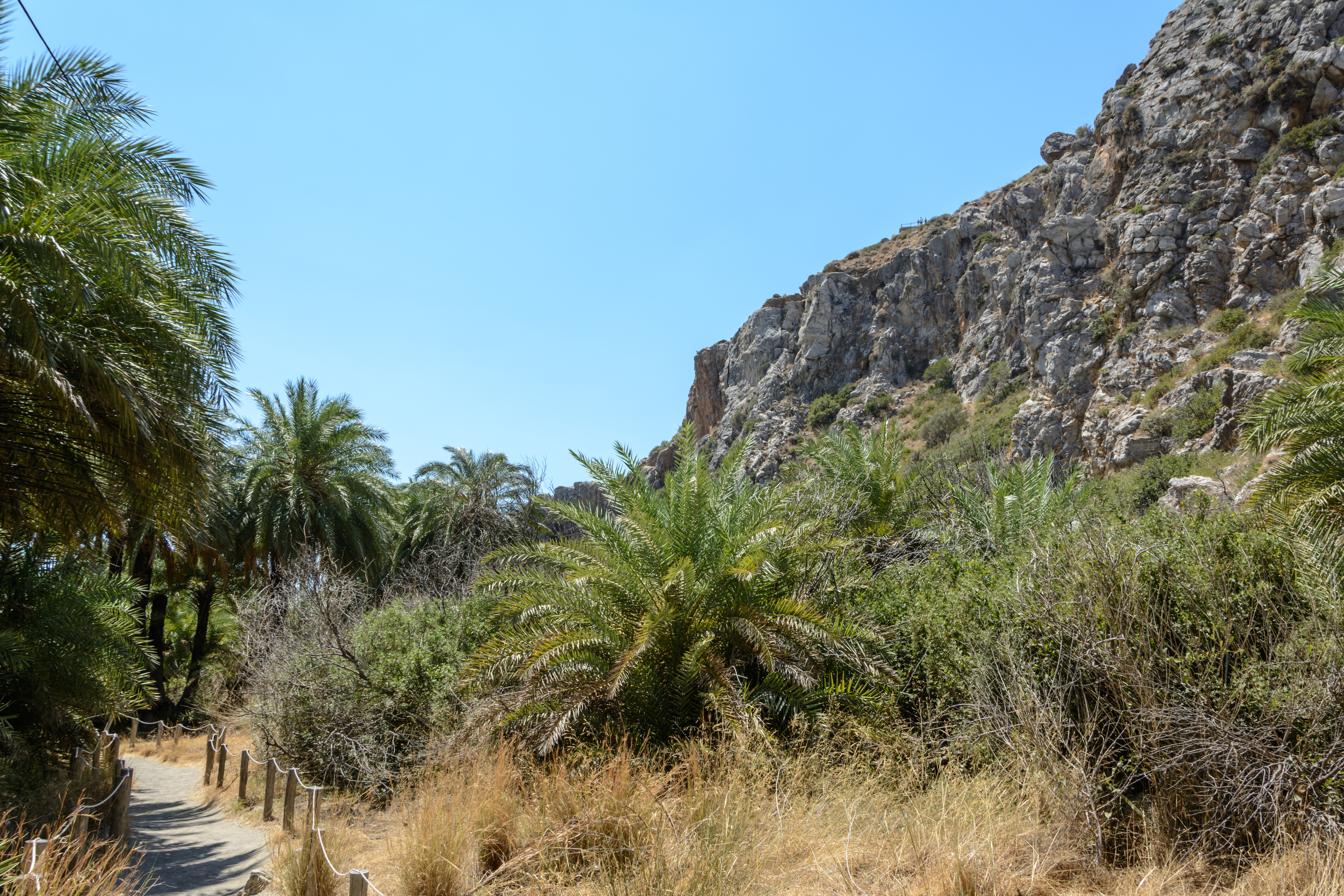
Vegetation on Crete dried out by the August heat

ἦμος δὴ λήγει μένος ὀξέος ἠελίοιο
καύματος ἰδαλίμου, μετοπωρινὸν ὀμβρήσαντος
Ζηνὸς ἐρισθενέος, μετὰ δὲ τρέπεται βρότεος χρὼς
πολλὸν ἐλαφρότερος: δὴ γὰρ τότε Σείριος ἀστὴρ
βαιὸν ὑπὲρ κεφαλῆς κηριτρεφέων ἀνθρώπων
ἔρχεται ἠμάτιος, πλεῖον δέ τε νυκτὸς ἐπαυρεῖ:
τῆμος ἀδηκτοτάτη πέλεται τμηθεῖσα σιδήρῳ
ὕλη, φύλλα δ᾽ ἔραζε χέει, πτόρθοιό τε λήγει:
τῆμος ἄρ᾽ ὑλοτομεῖν μεμνημένος ὥρια ἔργα.

Translation:

When the piercing power and sultry heat of the sun abate, and almighty Zeus sends the autumn rains, and men's flesh comes to feel far easier,—for then the star Sirius passes over the heads of men, who are born to misery, only a little while by day and takes greater share of night—then, when it showers its leaves to the ground and stops sprouting, the wood you cut with your axe is least liable to worm.

This effect of the combination of Sirius' light with the Sun's was understood to have an effect on plants, animals, and women, as well as men:

ἦμος δὲ σκόλυμός τ᾽ ἀνθεῖ καὶ ἠχέτα τέττιξ
δενδρέῳ ἐφεζόμενος λιγυρὴν καταχεύετ᾽ ἀοιδὴν
πυκνὸν ὑπὸ πτερύγων, θέρεος καματώδεος ὥρῃ,
τῆμος πιόταταί τ᾽ αἶγες καὶ οἶνος ἄριστος,
μαχλόταται δὲ γυναῖκες, ἀφαυρότατοι δέ τοι ἄνδρες
εἰσίν, ἐπεὶ κεφαλὴν καὶ γούνατα Σείριος ἄζει,
αὐαλέος δέ τε χρὼς ὑπὸ καύματος...

Translation:

But when the artichoke flowers, [i.e., June] and the chirping grass-hopper sits in a tree and pours down his shrill song continually from under his wings in the season of wearisome heat, then goats are plumpest and wine sweetest; women are most wanton, but men are feeblest, because Sirius parches head and knees and the skin is dry through heat.

About a century later, Alcaeus repeated the theme, advising his listeners to "steep your lungs in wine" before the arrival of the star since "women are at their foulest but men are weak since they are parched in head and knees". In the 3rd century, Aratus' Phenomena describes the time as Sirius blighting the bark of trees with its heat during the time it rises and sets with the sun.

The Kean priests of Zeus as Rainmaker and Lord of Moisture observed annual sacrifices before the rise of Sirius to prevent scorching drought. This practice was credited to the culture hero Aristaeus. Aristotle mentions the proverbial heat of the dog days as part of his argument against an early formulation of evolution in his Physics.

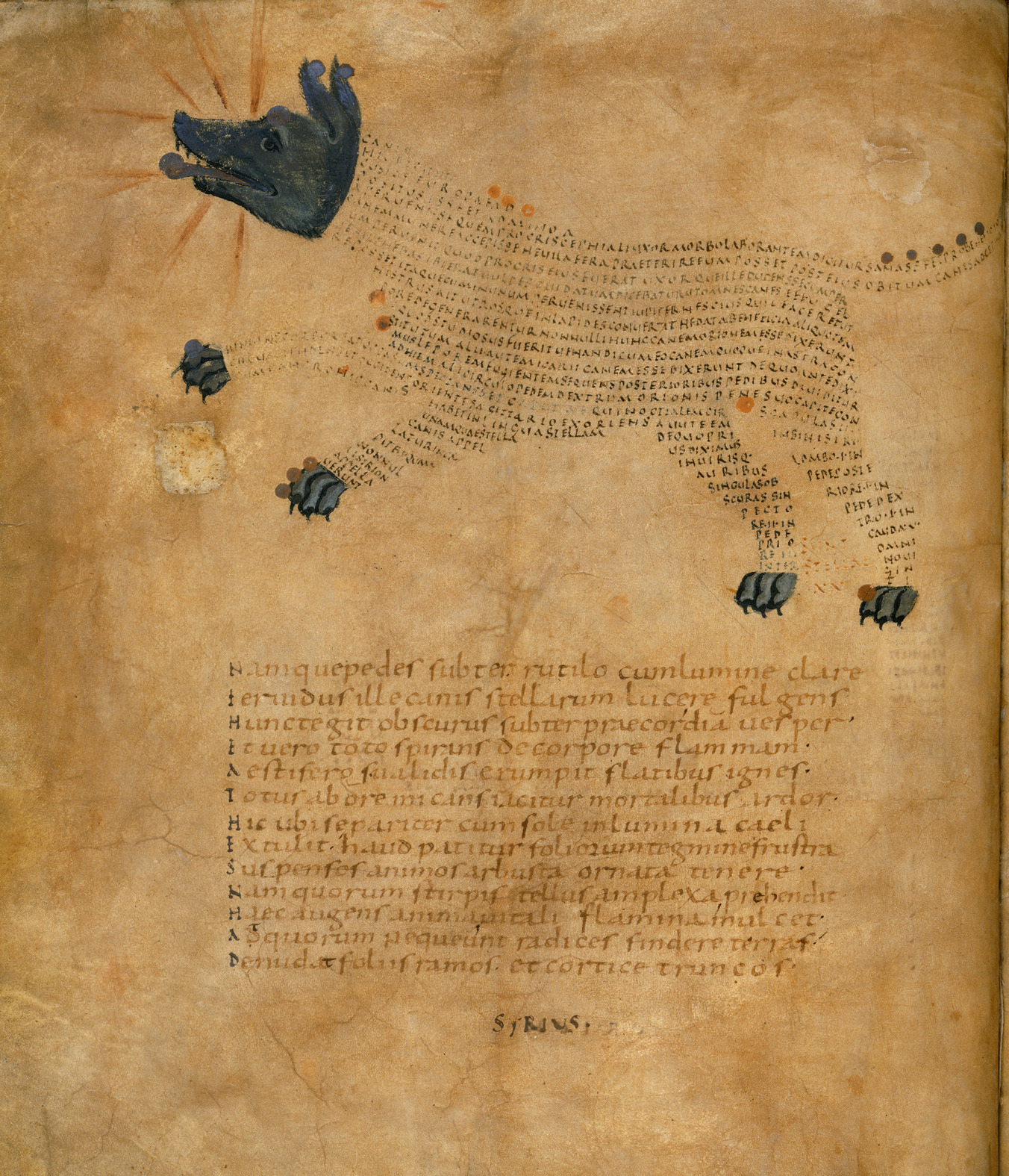
A 9th-century astronomical manuscript, including an illustration of the constellation "Canis Major"

The Romans continued to blame Sirius for the heat of the season and attendant lethargy and diseases. In his Georgics, Vergil notes vintners' efforts to protect their work during the time "when the Dog-star cleaves the thirsty Ground". Seneca's Oedipus complains of "the scorching dog-star's fires". Pliny's Natural History notes an increase in attacks by dogs during July and August, and advises feeding them chicken manure to curb the tendency. In the early 20th century, historians still noted the "discouraging heat" and "oppression" of the dog days of the Roman summer.

The period has long featured in western medicine. The 1564 English Hope of Health counseled that purging (bloodletting and induced vomiting) should be avoided during the "Dogge daies" of summer because "the Sunne is in Leo" and "then is nature burnt vp & made weake". The 1729 British Husbandman's Practice claimed that "The Heat of the Sun is so violent that Men's bodies at Midnight sweat as at Midday: and if they be hurt, they be more sick than at any other time, yea very near Dead". It therefore advised men to "abstain all this time from women" and to "take heed of feeding violently". In the 1813 Clavis Calendria, the dog days are a time wherein "the Sea boiled, the Wine turned sour, Dogs grew mad, Quinto raged with anger, and all other creatures became languid; causing to man, among other diseases, burning fevers, hysterics, and phrensies".

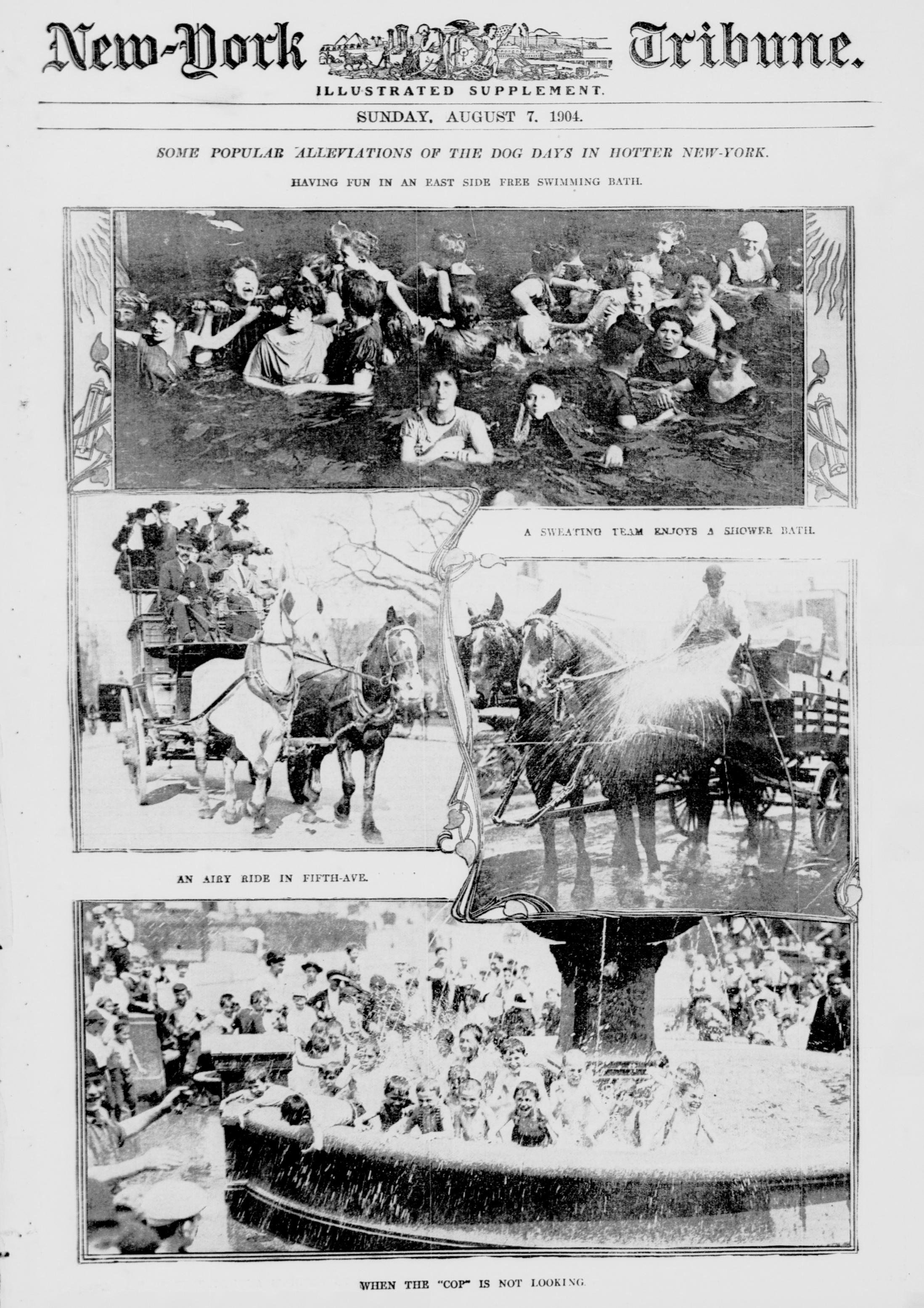
"Some Popular Alleviations of the Dog Days in Hotter New-York" in 1904, including children piled into a public fountain "when the 'cop' is not looking".

Even after astrology and its influence on health and agriculture waned in importance, the "dog days" continues to be vaguely applied to the hottest days of the summer, with its attendant effects on nature and society. In North America, it became proverbial among farmers that a dry growing season through the dog days was preferable to the trouble of a wet one:

Dog days bright and clear
Indicate a good year;
But when accompanied by rain,
We hope for better times in vain. (Note: Recorded in 1883 by Dunwoody.)

Because July is typically one of the quietest months of the year for stock trading, the term is sometimes used for the lethargic summer markets.

== Span ==
Various computations of the dog days have placed their start anywhere from 3 July to 15 August and lasting for anywhere from 30 to 61 days. They may begin or end with the cosmical rising or heliacal rising of either Sirius in Canis Major or Procyon (the "Little Dog Star") in Canis Minor and vary by latitude, not even being visible throughout much of the Southern Hemisphere. Sirius observes a period of almost exactly 365¼ days between risings, keeping it largely consistent with the Julian but not the Gregorian calendar; nonetheless, its dates occur somewhat later in the year over a span of millennia.

In antiquity, the dog days were usually reckoned from the appearance of Sirius around 19 July (Julian) to relieving rains and cool winds, although Hesiod seems to have counted the worst of summer as the days leading up to Sirius's reappearance.

In Anglo-Saxon England, the dog days ran from various dates in mid-July to early or mid-September. Canonical "dog daies" were observed from July 7 to September 5 in the 16th-century English liturgies. They were removed from the prayer books at the restoration of the monarchy in 1660 and their term shortened to the time between July 19 and August 20. During the British adoption of the Gregorian calendar in 1752, they were shifted from July 30 to September 7.

Many modern sources in the English-speaking world move this still earlier, from July 3 to August 11, ending rather than beginning with or centering on the reappearance of Sirius to the night sky.

== Scientific basis ==
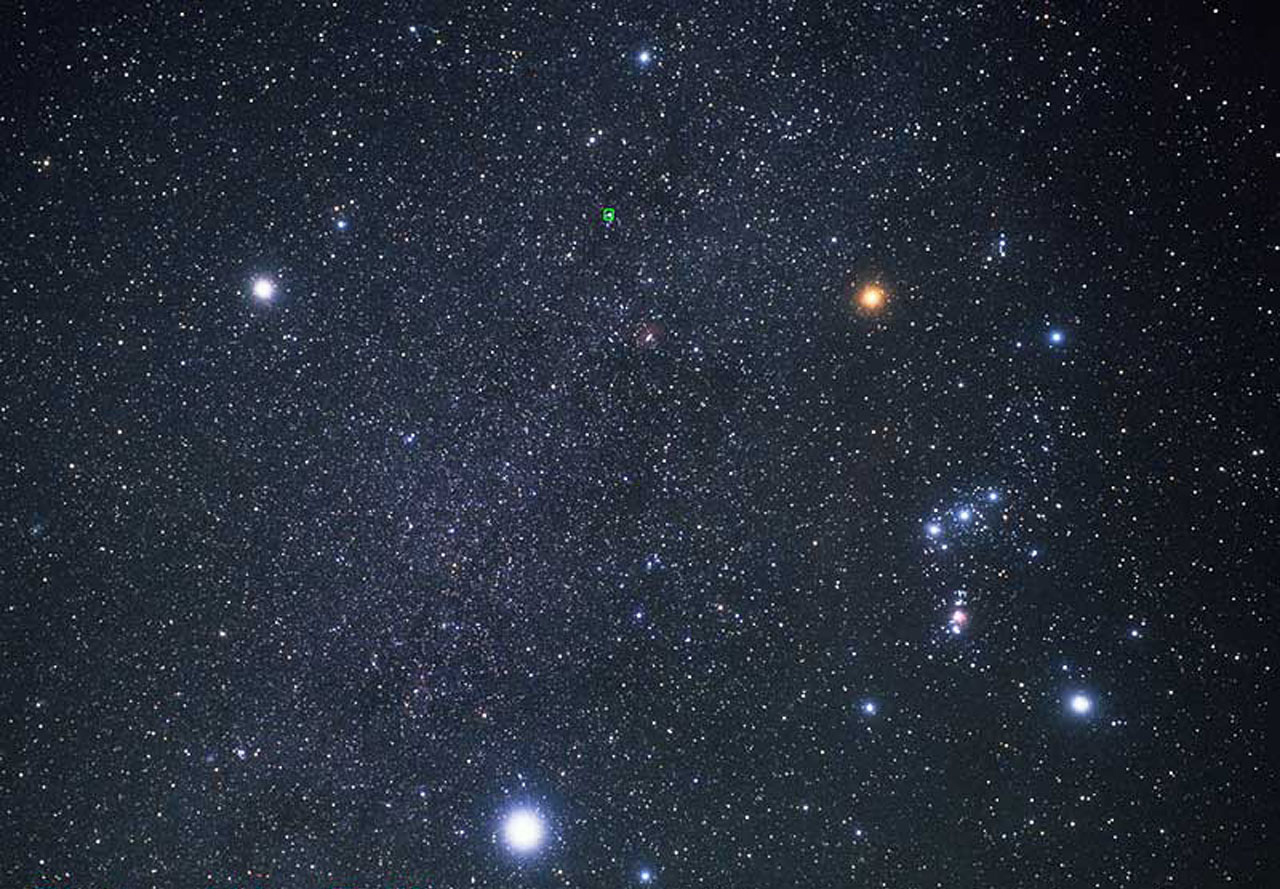
Orion (right) and Sirius (bottom), as seen from the Hubble Space Telescope

Although Sirius is the brightest proper star in the night sky, it is 8.7 light-years (2.7 pc; 8.2×10^{16} m) away from Earth and has no effect whatsoever on the planet's weather or temperature. (Note: For details, see Astrology.) Although the star continues to return to the night sky in late summer, its position continues to gradually shift relative to the Sun and will rise in the middle of winter in about 10,000 years.

The effects of summer heat and rainfall patterns are real, but vary by latitude and location according to many factors. For example, London, UK, is slightly farther north than Calgary, Canada, but has a milder climate from the presence of the sea and the warm Gulf Stream current. A medical institution has reported a connection between Finland's dog days and increased risk of infection in deep surgery wounds, although that research remains unverified.

== In popular culture ==
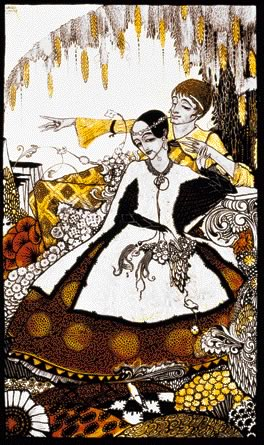
Harry Clarke's 1917 illustration of Synge's poem

It is possible that Saint Roch, the legendary medieval patron saint of dogs celebrated by the Catholic Church on 16 August, owes some of his legacy to the dog days. From the period of his self-proclaimed protectorate over the island, the Danish adventurer Jørgen Jørgensen is remembered in Iceland as Jørgen the Dog-Day King (Icelandic: Jörundur hundadagakonungur).

In western literature, apart from the Greek and Roman works mentioned above, the dog days appear in John Webster's 1613 play The Duchess of Malfi, (Note: Bosola states that "blackbirds fatten best in hard weather: why not I in these dog days?") Charles Dickens' 1843 novella A Christmas Carol, (Note: Ebenezer Scrooge is described as "carr[ying] his own low temperature always about with him" to the point where "he iced his office in the dog-days".) R.H. Davis's 1903 short story "The Bar Sinister", (Note: The main character, a street dog, opines that "when the hot days come... they might remember that those are the dog days, and leave a little water outside… like they do for the horses".) J.M. Synge's 1909 poem "Queens", (Note: The poem opens: Seven dog-days we let pass Naming Queens in Glenmacnass...) and Richard Adams's 1972 novel Watership Down. (Note: Describing the English summer, Adams writes "Now came the dog days—day after day of hot, still summer, when for hours at a time light seemed the only thing that moved; the sky-sun, clouds and breeze-awake above the drowsing downs.) They feature in the children's novels Tuck Everlasting (1973), (Note: Describing the book's setting in the first week of August, the prologue speaks of "strange and breathless days, the dog days, when people are led to do things they are sure to be sorry for after".) and Dog Days (2009) from the Diary of a Wimpy Kid series.

Dog Days is also the title of a Japanese anime series that premiered in 2011. The story revolves around a boy named Shinku Izumi, who is summoned to an alternate world where the inhabitants have animal ears and tails.

In film, Dog Day Afternoon (1975) and Hundstage (German for "Dog Days"; 2001) evoke their oppressive seasonal settings. The 2010 videogame Kane & Lynch 2: Dog Days utilizes the term to a similar effect.

In music, there are Head of David's "Dog Day Sunrise", covered by Fear Factory in 1995; Florence and the Machine's 2009 "Dog Days Are Over"; and Within Temptation's 2013 "Dog Days"; as well as the album Dog Days by the US southern rock band Atlanta Rhythm Section; in the title track from Taylor Swift's 2020 album Evermore, Bon Iver, who is featured on the song, mentions "the violence of the dog days".

Dog Days is also the title of a 2012 opera by composer David T. Little and librettist Royce Vavrek, based on the short story by Judy Budnitz.

"Dog-day" promotions are also a common feature in baseball, used by American ballparks to boost ticket sales during mid-afternoon games.

== See also ==
- Heat wave
- Indian summer
- Silly season
- Star lore
- Tropical night

== Bibliography ==
- Adams, Richard (1972), Watership Down, Oneworld Publications, ISBN 978-0-901720-31-3.
- Alcaeus of Mytilene (1996), Miller, A.M. (ed.), Greek Lyric: An Anthology in Translation, Indianapolis: Hackett, pp. 38–50.
- Aristotle (1930), Hardie, R.P.; et al. (eds.), Physica, The Works of Aristotle, Vol. II, Oxford: Clarendon Press.
- Babbitt, Natalie (1975), Tuck Everlasting, New York: Scholastic, ISBN 9780374480127.
- Brady, John (1813), Clavis Calendaria, Vol. II, London: Longman, Hurst, Rees, Orme, & Brown.
- Carter, Jesse Benedict (1911), The Religious Life of Ancient Rome, New York: Houghton Mifflin.
- Chardonnens, László Sándor (2007), Anglo-Saxon Prognostics, 900–1100, Leiden: Brill, ISBN 978-90-04-15829-0.
- Dickens, Charles (1843), A Christmas Carol, London: Chapman & Hall.
- Dunwoody, Henry Harrison Chase (1883), "Proverbs Relating to Months, Weeks, and Days", Weather Proverbs, Signal Service Notes, No. IX, Washington, D.C.: Government Printing Office.
- Edwards, Anthony (2004), Hesiod's Ascra, Berkeley: University of California Press, ISBN 9780520236585.
- Harris, Paul; et al. (eds.), Old Farmer's Almanac, Dublin: Yankee Publishing.
- Hesiod (1914), Evelyn-White, Hugh G. (ed.), The Homeric Hymns and Homerica, Cambridge: Harvard University Press.
- Holberg, Jay B. (2007), Sirius: Brightest Diamond in the Night Sky, Berlin: Springer Praxis Books, ISBN 978-0387489421.
- Homer (1997), Lombardo, Stanley (ed.), The Iliad, Indianapolis: Hackett, ISBN 9780872203525.
- Kelly, Bethanne; et al. (2009), An Uncommon History of Common Things, Washington, D.C.: National Geographic Books, ISBN 978-1426204203.
- Kinney, Jeff (2009), Dog Days, Diary of a Wimpy Kid, Bk. 2, New York: Amulet Books, ISBN 978-0-8109-8391-5.
- McHugh, Susan (2004), Dog, London: Reaktion, ISBN 9781861894885.
- Moore, Philip (1564), The Hope of Health, London: Ihon Kyngston.
- Seneca, Lucius Annaeus (1917), Miller, Frank Justus (ed.), Oedipus, Loeb Classical Library, Cambridge: Harvard University Press.
- Staudohar, Paul D. (2007), The Best Dog Stories, Chicago: Chicago Review Press, ISBN 978-1-55652-667-1.
- Synge, Edmund John Millington (1909), Poems and Translations, Dublin: Dundrum, excerpted by the University of Toronto Library.
- Townsend, George H. (1862), The Manual of Dates, London: Cox & Wyman for Routledge, Warne, & Routledge.
- Vergilius Maro, Publius (1697), "Georgics, Bk II", in Dryden, John (ed.), The Works of Virgil, London: Jacob Tonson.
- Webster, John (1613), The Duchess of Malfi, archived from the original on 2015-09-05, reprinted in 1914 as Vol. XLVII, Pt. 4, of the Harvard Classics series.
