= Hunger Artist =

Hunger Artist may refer to:

- Hunger artists, performance artists popular in the 1880s
- "A Hunger Artist", a 1922 short story by Franz Kafka
- A Hunger Artist (short story collection), a 1924 collection of short stories by Franz Kafka
- The Hunger Artist (play), a 1987 Richard Greenberg play
- "The Hunger Artist" (CSI episode), a 2002 episode of CSI

== See also ==
- "The Hunger Art", a 2008 opera based on Kafka's story
- Hunger Artists Theatre Company, a California alternative theater group
