= Christopher Rountree =

American conductor (born 1983)

- Origin: United States
- Occupations: Conductor, composer

Christopher Rountree (b. April 1983) is an American conductor and composer known for founding the Los Angeles chamber group wild Up, an ensemble that blends new music, classical repertoire, performance art and pop. Wild Up was named "Best Classical Music of 2012" by the Los Angeles Times.

Rountree has also conducted the Los Angeles Philharmonic’s Brooklyn new music festival, the San Diego Symphony, the Colorado Symphony, the Los Angeles Chamber Orchestra, and the San Francisco Conservatory Orchestra. He has worked with the Brooklyn Philharmonic, New York's Prototype Festival and Beth Morrison Projects, and assisted conductor Alan Pierson on the critically acclaimed opera "Dog Days." He is a lecturer in conducting at the University of California, Santa Barbara. He also serves as "Artistic Advisor for New Music" for the American Youth Symphony.

Rountree is known for his lively conducting style, with the Los Angeles Times writing in one wild Up review, "Rountree punches out rhythms as if they were going out of style. He emphasizes outsize emotions. He could probably get an audience to dance to the slowest movement Shostakovich ever wrote." While such reviews are typical, he has also been praised for "elegant clarity" in The New York Times.

Rountree holds his master's degree in orchestral conducting from the University of Michigan, graduating in 2009.

As a performer, in 2004, he won Drum Corps International's euphonium soloist competition.
