= Vinkensport, or The Finch Opera =

Opera by David T. Little

Vinkensport, or The Finch Opera is a comic opera in one act by David T. Little to a libretto by Royce Vavrek.

Commissioned for the Bard College Conservatory of Music Orchestra, the world premiere of Vinkensport, or The Finch Opera was presented at the Richard B. Fisher Center on February 26, 2010 performed by students in Bard's graduate vocal performance program with James Bagwell conducting. Dan Rigazzi provided stage direction.

== Roles and role creators ==
- Sir Elton John's Trainer, Celine Mogielnicki (soprano)
- Farinelli's Trainer, Madyson Page (soprano)
- Holy St. Francis's Trainer, Clarissa Lyons (soprano)
- Prince Gabriel III of Belgium's Trainer's Son, Jeongcheol Cha (baritone)
- Hans Sachs's Trainer, Jeffrey Hill (tenor)
- Atticus Finch's Trainer, Leroy Y. Davis (bass-baritone)

== Synopsis ==
The opera is about finch-sitting (or Vinkensport in Flemish), a sport that developed around birdsong in the late 16th century in Flanders.
