= Kamala Sankaram =

American classical composer

Kamala Sankaram (born 1978) is an American composer, vocalist, playwright, and actress. Based in New York City, she is best known for chamber operas about women forced to confront patriarchal structures. Sankaram is also known for incorporating modern technology (e.g., virtual reality) and discussing the social effects of technology in musical theater works.

== Life ==
The daughter of a Telugu father from India and a White-American mother, Sankaram was born in Orange County, California, and grew up largely in Ramona, a small town in San Diego County. She took piano lessons as a child, but her interest soon turned to theater. She grew up listening to Telugu movie soundtracks and Carnatic music with her father, and Debussy and Rachmaninoff with her mother. She has said: "I was in a theater show called Choice in Southern California. I would do these big dance and song numbers and that's what got me even more interested in it. I wanted to be on Broadway!"

In 1996, Sankaram moved to New York to attend Sarah Lawrence College. She then earned doctorate in cognitive psychology at the New School of Social Research. Her 2013 dissertation examines how interactivity affects the way people process information online. She concludes: "Reading on the Internet may also have the potential to create a more positive effect on reading in the form of deeper information processing. In particular, reading may be enhanced by the presence of some form of interactive, two-way communication, such as a comments section."

== Musical career ==
Sankaram's musical career began as she was finishing her Ph.D., ironically because, she said, "I couldn't get any grant money to research on Twitter, but people started asking me to write more music". Her catalogue includes 11 musical theatrical works, some of which have been produced by the Washington National Opera, the Los Angeles Opera, and the Houston Grand Opera, and numerous vocal and instrumental chamber works. Of her musical inspirations, Sankaram has said, "I have played as much rock and avant jazz as I have classical music, and those connections are found in the music I write." In the same interview, she added: "I grew up hearing a lot of Carnatic music in my house, so I think that those modalities are always present. As far as specific influences, they range from [Anthony] Braxton to Strauss to Radiohead and Pink Floyd." She also loves Bollywood songs, and incorporates elements of that style in many works.

As a coloratura soprano, Sankaram has starred in many of her own works, and performed with Braxton, Meredith Monk, the Philip Glass Ensemble, and the Wooster Group. She is also the leader of Bombay Rickey, a five-piece band that evokes 1960s movie soundscapes through a fusion of surf music, cumbia, Bollywood, film noir jazz, Spaghetti Western, and opera.

Sankaram teaches composition at State University of New York-Purchase, and is co-artistic director of Experiments in Opera, a New York-based company that believes in "rewriting the history of opera" by producing new works that are "adventurous and fun, focused on strong and intimate storytelling". Of the latter role, she has said: "We tend to hire those that we can think of quickly, and we tend to be able to think of people who are most similar to us more quickly than people who are not. As both a woman and a person of South Asian descent, my worldview and my network are different than many people in the field. Therefore, as a gatekeeper, I see my role as inviting people to the table who may not have had an invitation before."

== Selected commissions and awards ==
=== Commissions ===
- Washington National Opera
- Houston Grand Opera
- Beth Morrison Projects
- Prototype Festival
- Opera on Tap (for The Parksville Murders)
- Opera Memphis
- Brooklyn Youth Chorus

=== Awards ===
- American Theater Wing: Jonathan Larson Award
- New York Innovative Theatre Awards: Outstanding Production of a Musical (Miranda)
- Independent Music Awards Vox Pop: Best Eclectic Award (Bombay Rickey’s Cinefonia)

== Grants ==
- National Endowment for the Arts
- Opera America
- Kevin Spacey Foundation
- The MAP Fund

== Residencies and fellowships ==
- MacDowell Colony
- The Watermill Center
- The Civilians
- HERE Arts Center (for the musical Miranda)
- CAP21
- Con Edison/Exploring the Metropolis
- The Hermitage
- American Lyric Theater

== Bibliography ==
- Suzanne G. Cusick, "Women in Impossible Situations: Missy Mazzoli and Kamala Sankaram on Sexual Violence in Opera." Journal of the American Musicological Society, Vol. 71, No. 1 (Spring 2018), pp. 243-248.
- Hillary LaBonte, "Analyzing Gender Inequality in Contemporary Opera." D.M.A. dissertation: Bowling Green State University, 2019.
- Sean Sonderegger, "New World, New Music: Creative Music Communities in New Haven and Woodstock in the 1970s and Their Legacies." Ph.D. dissertation: Wesleyan University, 2018.
- Kamala Sankaram & Michael F. Schober, "Reading a Blog When Empowered to Comment: Posting, Lurking, and Noninteractive Reading." Discourse Processes Vol. 52, No. 5-6 (2015), pp. 406–433.
- Kamala Sankaram, "Finding a Voice: The Story of Mukhtar Mai." International Arts Manager, January 10, 2014. http://www.internationalartsmanager.com/blog/finding-voice-story-mukhtar-mai.html
