= The Hunger Art =

- Opera by Jeff Myers
- Librettist: Royce Vavrek
- Language: English
- Premiere: 7 January 2008; American Lyric Theater

The Hunger Art is an opera in one act by Jeff Myers, to a libretto by Royce Vavrek after Franz Kafka.

Written during Myers's residency at American Lyric Theater, the opera was performed in concert at the Leonard Nimoy Thalia Theatre at Peter Norton Symphony Space in Manhattan, New York, on January 7, 2008.

== Roles and role creators ==
- Ivona, Amanda Pabyan
- Alfons, Thomas Wazelle
- Milos, David Korn
- Bronislav, Bryce Smith
- Butcher, Edwin Vega

== Synopsis ==
The opera is a narrative hybrid of Kafka's short story "A Hunger Artist" and a revisionist take on Adam and Eve.
