= Jeff Myers =

Jeff Myers may refer to:

- Jeff Myers (composer)
- Jeff Myers (basketball)
- Jeff Myers (politician)
