= Matt Haimovitz =

Israeli-American and Canadian cellist and music producer (born 1970)

- מאט חיימוביץ
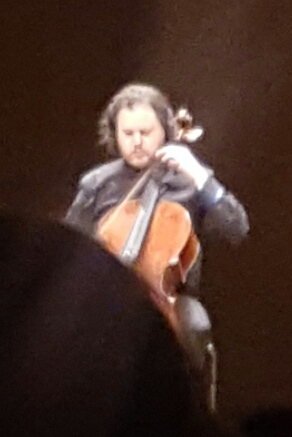
- Matt Haimovitz photographed in Montréal, Quebec, Canada at the MBAM Bourgie Hall., 2017
- Born: December 3, 1970 (age 55); Bat-Yam, Israel
- Education: Juilliard School, Harvard University
- Occupation: Cellist
- Years active: 1984 - present
- Employer(s): Oxingale Productions, Inc; McGill University Schulich School of Music; Mannes New School of Music
- Website: https://www.matthaimovitz.com/

Matt Haimovitz (Hebrew: מאט חיימוביץ; born December 3, 1970) is a cellist based in the United States and Canada. Born in Israel, he grew up in the US from the age of five. He plays mainly a cello made by Matteo Goffriller in 1710.

== Family, musical education and early career ==
Matt Haimovitz was born in the Israeli town of Bat Yam as son of Meir and Marlena Haimovitz, a Jewish couple who moved to Israel from Romania. When he was 5 years old, the family settled in Palo Alto, California.

Haimovitz began to study the cello at the age of seven with Irene Sharp in California. At the age of nine, he switched teachers to Gábor Reitő. When Haimovitz was twelve years old, Itzhak Perlman, who was impressed by his performances at a music camp in Santa Barbara, introduced him to Leonard Rose. In order for him to study with Rose at the Juilliard School, his family moved to New York in 1983. Haimovitz attended high school at Collegiate School (New York City) on the Upper West Side. Rose described Haimovitz as "probably the greatest talent I have ever taught", praising his "ravishingly beautiful tone" and "unusual sense of style and musical sensitivity".

In February 1985, Haimovitz joined Zubin Mehta and the Israel Philharmonic Orchestra in a concert which was filmed and broadcast. This success was followed in 1986 by an American tour with Mehta and the Israel Philharmonic, as well as concerts with the New York Philharmonic. In the same year Haimovitz was awarded an Avery Fisher Career Grant for exceptional musical achievement, the youngest musician to receive this award. Over the next decade, Haimovitz appeared with many of the major orchestras of North America, Europe and Asia, and worked with the most distinguished conductors. In 1987, at the age of 17, Haimovitz signed an exclusive recording contract with Deutsche Grammophon Gesellschaft, where several of his recordings of standard and non-standard repertoire won international awards.

== Recent career ==
After graduating from Harvard College in 1996, and with the termination of his contract with Deutsche Grammophon, Haimovitz became dissatisfied with the traditional career path of a modern classical musician. He began exploring non-standard classical and non-classical repertoire more intensively, and began a program of concerts in unusual venues. A 2002 North American tour that attracted international attention saw Haimovitz performing Bach's cello suites in night clubs, restaurants and other highly untraditional venues in a wide variety of towns and cities across the United States. This was followed in 2003 by Haimovitz's Anthem tour, in which he brought a variety of American compositions to a similar variety of audiences, including his rendition of Jimi Hendrix's famous improvisational rendition of "The Star-Spangled Banner."

In 2000, Haimovitz founded his own record label, Oxingale with composer Luna Pearl Woolf, which has released CD recordings of his own recital programs, as well as music performed by others. In 2010 this label expanded to include a music publishing branch, which features works commissioned, performed, and recorded by Haimovitz.

"Shuffle. Play.Listen", his 2-disc collaboration with pianist Christopher O'Riley in 2011, was hailed for its innovation in mixing together Bernard Hermann film scores, Janácek, and Cocteau Twins. "The idea behind it is to blast away at any and all categories...", wrote Richard Ginell of the L.A. Times.

From 1999 to 2004, Haimovitz was a faculty member at the University of Massachusetts in Amherst, Massachusetts. Since 2004, he has taught at the Schulich School of Music of McGill University in Montreal as well as the Domaine Forget academy for the arts in rural Quebec.

In June 2013, Haimovitz went on an international tour to Italy performing with the Palo Alto Chamber Orchestra. He also recorded Philip Glass' Cello Concerto No. 2 with Dennis Russell Davies and the Cincinnati Symphony; the concerto is a reworking of the film score ''Naqoyqatsi''.

From 2015 Oxingale and PENTATONE record label have joined forces and formed the PENTATONE Oxingale Series, re-releasing old albums - now also digitally available and distributed worldwide - and producing new ones. In 2015, Haimovitz released two recordings on PENTATONE using period instruments: the cello sonatas of Ludwig van Beethoven, with pianist Christopher O'Riley; and a second recording of Bach's cello suites (on Haimovitz's earlier traversal, recorded in 2000, he had used a modernized cello and bow).

== Discography ==
Release date	Album	Label
1989	Saint-Saens: Cello Concertos / Bruch: Kol Nidrei / Lalo: Concerto for Violoncello and Orchestra in D Minor	Deutsche Grammophon
1990	Haydn, C.P.E. Bach, Boccherini: Cello Concertos	Deutsche Grammophon
1992	Suites and Sonatas for Solo Cello - Reger: Suite in G major, Op. 131c/1; Crumb: Sonata; Britten: Suite No. 1, Op. 72; Ligeti: Sonata	Deutsche Grammophon
1995	Trios with Rob Wasserman	GRP Records
1995	The 20th Century Cello	Deutsche Grammophon
1997	The 20th Century Cello Volume 2	Deutsche Grammophon
1999	Portes Ouvertes: The 20th Century Cello Volume 3	Deutsche Grammophon
1999	Undertree	Oxingale Records
2000	Bach: 6 Suites for Cello Solo	Oxingale Records
2001	Lemons Descending	Oxingale Records
2002	The Rose Album	Oxingale Records
2003	Anthem	Oxingale Records
2003	Haydn: The Cello Concertos; Mozart: Cello Concerto	Transart Live
2003	Hyperstring Trilogy	Oxingale Records
2004	Please Welcome...Matt Haimovitz	Oxingale Records
2004	Epilogue	Oxingale Records
2005	Goulash!	Oxingale Records
2006	Mozart the Mason	Oxingale Records
2006	Apres Moi, le Deluge	Oxingale Records
2007	David Sanford & the Pittsburgh Collective: Live at the Knitting Factory	Oxingale Records
2007	After Reading Shakespeare	Oxingale Records
2007	VinylCello	Oxingale Records
2008	J.S. Bach Goldberg Variations	Oxingale Records
2008	Odd Couple	Oxingale Records
2008	And if the song be worth a smile	Pentatone
2009	Figment	Oxingale Records
2010	Meeting of the Spirits	Oxingale Records
2011	Shuffle.Play.Listen (In collaboration with Christopher O'Riley	Oxingale Records
2011	Matteo: 300 Years of Italian Cello	Oxingale Records
2012	Paul Moravec: Northern Lights Electric	BMOP/sound
2012	Laura Elise Schwendinger: Three Works	Albany Music Distribution
2013	Glass: Cello Concerto No. 2 "Naqoyqatsi"	Orange Mountain Music
2013	The Hours Begin to Sing	Pentatone
2013	AngelHeart	Oxingale Records
2014	Akoka: Reframing Oliver Messiaen's Quartet for the End of Time	Oxingale Records
2015	Beethoven, Period.	PENTATONE
2015	Orbit	PENTATONE
2015	J.S. Bach The Cello Suites According to Anna Magdalena	PENTATONE
2016	Shuffle.Play.Listen	PENTATONE
2016	Schubert Arpeggione Sonata & String Quintet	PENTATONE
2016	Ouvertures to Bach	PENTATONE
2016	Out of the Shadows	PENTATONE
2017	Akoka - Reframing Messiaen's Quartet for the End of Time	PENTATONE
2017	Meeting of the Spirits	PENTATONE
2017	Troika	PENTATONE
2018	PENTATONE OXINGALE SERIES ''MOZART DIVERTIMENTO & Preludes to Bach"	PENTATONE
2018	PENTATONE OXINGALE SERIES "Tippet Rise Opus 2017"	PENTATONE
2018	PENTATONE OXINGALE SERIES ''Isang Yun - Sunrise Falling"	PENTATONE
2020	MON AMI, Mon Amour - French Repertoire for Cello and Piano (with Mari Kodama)	PENTATONE
2021	OXINGALE PRESENTS Primavera I: the wind	PENTATONE
2022	OXINGALE PRESENTS PRIMAVERA II: the rabbits	PENTATONE
2022	OXINGALE PRESENTS Primavera III: the vessel	PENTATONE
2023	De Hartmann: Cello Concerto	PENTATONE
2024	Thomas de Hartmann Rediscovered	PENTATONE
2024	Jacqueline (with Marnie Breckenridge / Luna Pearl Woolf)	PENTATONE
2025	Schnittke: Cello Concerto No. 1	PENTATONE
2025	La Kobsa	PENTATONE
2026	The Bach Dialogues	PENTATONE
