= Clemency (film) =

2019 film

- Theatrical release poster
- Directed by: Chinonye Chukwu
- Written by: Chinonye Chukwu
- Produced by: Bronwyn Cornelius; Julian Cautherley; Peter Wong; Timur Bekbosunov
- Starring: Alfre Woodard; Richard Schiff; Danielle Brooks; Michael O'Neill; Richard Gunn; Wendell Pierce; Aldis Hodge
- Cinematography: Eric Branco
- Edited by: Phyllis Housen
- Music by: Kathryn Bostic
- Production companies: ACE Pictures; Big Indie Pictures; Bronwyn Cornelius Productions
- Distributed by: Neon
- Release dates: January 27, 2019 (Sundance); December 27, 2019 (United States)
- Running time: 113 minutes
- Country: United States
- Language: English
- Box office: $364,952

Clemency is a 2019 American drama film written and directed by Chinonye Chukwu. It stars Alfre Woodard, Richard Schiff, Danielle Brooks, Michael O'Neill, Richard Gunn, Wendell Pierce, and Aldis Hodge. The plot follows the lives of prison warden Bernadine Williams (Woodard) and death row inmate Anthony Woods (Hodge).

Clemency had its world premiere at the Sundance Film Festival, where it won the Grand Jury Prize for U.S. Dramatic Competition, on January 27, 2019 and was theatrically released in the United States by Neon on December 27, 2019. The film received acclaim from critics, who lauded Woodard's performance, as well as Chukwu's direction and screenplay. It earned nominations for Best Feature, Best Female Lead (for Woodard), and Best Screenplay (for Chukwu) at the 35th Independent Spirit Awards and Best Actress in a Leading Role (for Woodard) at the 74th British Academy Film Awards.

== Plot ==
Warden Bernadine Williams oversees the execution of inmate Victor Jimenez alongside the prison chaplain David Kendricks. The attending medical officer fails to find an adequate arm vein and begins to panic. Bernadine gives the medical officer permission to use the femoral vein. The execution goes awry, and Victor writhes on the table before his heart finally stops.

One of Bernadine's inmates is Anthony Woods, a quiet man who continues to maintain his innocence and refuses to talk to Bernadine when she visits his cell on death row. Bernadine is well acquainted with Anthony's lawyer, Marty, who has been fighting to free his client for the past seven years. Bernadine learns through Marty that Anthony has lost his final appeal. She begins to make preparations for his death. At home, Bernadine suffers from insomnia and recurring nightmares.

While she maintains an outwardly calm and professional appearance, she struggles emotionally, drinking heavily after work and feuding with her husband, Jonathan. Jonathan, a high school teacher, wants Bernadine to quit her job as he sees how heavily her work has been weighing on her. After an argument on the night of their wedding anniversary, Jonathan leaves Bernadine and checks into a motel.

Anthony receives a letter from his former girlfriend Evette, informing him that he is a father. He consents to see her during visiting hours, where she reveals that she hid her pregnancy from him and raised their son with another man because it was a better life for their child than with a father on death row. She offers to let Anthony see his son before he is executed.

Having exhausted the number of court appeals, Marty files an appeal hoping for a last-minute pardon from the state governor. He makes television appearances and continues to visit Anthony often. Bernadine visits Chaplain Kendricks and asks him not to give up on Anthony. Jonathan returns home and reconciles, but Bernadine continues to keep her emotions to herself.

On the day of his execution, Anthony waits for Evette and his son, but they fail to show up. Bernadine leaves voicemails on Evette's phone to no avail. As Marty and Chaplain Kendricks offer Anthony solace, the governor's office calls the prison to inform they will not grant clemency.

Anthony is escorted to the execution room and strapped into the execution table. In his final statement, Anthony speaks to Mr. and Mrs. Collins, the parents of the man he was convicted of murdering. He expresses sorrow for their loss and reasserts his innocence. He thanks Marty and Chaplain Kendricks for their help throughout the years. Bernadine weeps as she watches him die.

== Cast ==
- Alfre Woodard as Bernadine Williams
- Richard Schiff as Marty Lumetta
- Aldis Hodge as Anthony Woods
- Wendell Pierce as Jonathan Williams
- Danielle Brooks as Evette Wilkinson
- Michael O'Neill as David Kendricks
- Richard Gunn as Thomas Morgan
- LaMonica Garrett as Logan Cartwright
- Vernee Watson-Johnson as Mrs. Collins
- Dennis Haskins as Mr. Collins
- John Churchill as Officer Brooks
- Alex Castillo as Victor Jimenez
- Alma Martinez as Ms. Jimenez
- Michelle C. Bonilla as Sonia
- Jed Bernard as Death Watch Officer
- William B. Simmons II as Evette's Son

== Production ==
Chukwu was inspired to write the film after the widely protested execution of Troy Davis in Georgia in 2011. Her six years of research included running a film programme for inmates in Ohio and advocating for retrials in unsafe cases.

== Release ==
The film had its world premiere at the Sundance Film Festival on January 27, 2019. It won the U.S. Dramatic Grand Jury Prize there, making Chukwu the first black woman to win the award. Shortly after, Neon acquired distribution rights to the film. It screened at the San Diego International Film Festival on October 18, 2019. It was released on December 27, 2019.

== Reception ==
=== Critical response ===
On the review aggregator website Rotten Tomatoes, 92% of 154 critics' reviews are positive, with an average rating of 7.8/10. The website's consensus reads: "Clemency mines serious social issues for gripping drama, brought to life by an outstanding cast led by Alfre Woodard." Metacritic, which uses a weighted average, assigned the film a score of 77 out of 100, based on 32 critics, indicating "generally favorable" reviews.

Matt Fagerholm of RogerEbert.com lauded Woodard's performance in the final scene, writing, "This is screen acting of a very rare sort, and Clemency is a vital emotional powerhouse sorely deserving of being seen." Eric Kohn of IndieWire gave the film an "A−" and wrote: "Writer-director Chinonye Chukwu's second feature maintains the quiet, steady rhythms of a woman so consumed by her routine that by the end of the opening credits, it appears to have consumed her humanity as well."

=== Accolades ===
| Award | Date of ceremony | Category | Recipient(s) and nominee(s) | Result | Ref(s) |
|---|---|---|---|---|---|
| Sundance Film Festival | February 2, 2019 | U.S. Dramatic Grand Jury Prize | Chinonye Chukwu | Won | |
| Seattle International Film Festival | June 9, 2019 | Best Actress | Alfre Woodard | Second place | |
| Seattle International Film Festival | June 9, 2019 | Best Actor | Aldis Hodge | Fourth Place | |
| Philadelphia Film Festival | October 17, 2019 | Best Local Feature | Chinonye Chukwu | Won | |
| Gotham Awards | December 2, 2019 | Best Actress | Alfre Woodard | Nominated | |
| Gotham Awards | December 2, 2019 | Best Actor | Aldis Hodge | Nominated | |
| Casting Society of America | January 30, 2020 | Low Budget – Comedy or Drama | Kerry Barden, Paul Schnee, Roya Semnanian | Nominated | |
| Black Reel Awards | February 6, 2020 | Outstanding Independent Film | Chinonye Chukwu, Timur Bekbosunov, Julian Cautherley, Bronwyn Cornelius and Peter Wong | Nominated | |
| Black Reel Awards | February 6, 2020 | Outstanding Actress | Alfre Woodard | Nominated | |
| Black Reel Awards | February 6, 2020 | Outstanding Supporting Actor | Aldis Hodge | Nominated | |
| Black Reel Awards | February 6, 2020 | Outstanding Breakthrough Performance, Male | Aldis Hodge | Nominated | |
| Black Reel Awards | February 6, 2020 | Outstanding Screenplay, Adapted or Original | Chinonye Chukwu | Nominated | |
| Black Reel Awards | February 6, 2020 | Outstanding Emerging Director | Chinonye Chukwu | Nominated | |
| Black Reel Awards | February 6, 2020 | Outstanding First Screenplay | Chinonye Chukwu | Nominated | |
| Independent Spirit Awards | February 8, 2020 | Best Feature | Timur Bekbosunov, Julian Cautherley, Bronwyn Cornelius and Peter Wong | Nominated | |
| Independent Spirit Awards | February 8, 2020 | Best Female Lead | Alfre Woodard | Nominated | |
| Independent Spirit Awards | February 8, 2020 | Best Screenplay | Chinonye Chukwu | Nominated | |
| NAACP Image Awards | February 22, 2020 | Outstanding Independent Motion Picture | Clemency | Nominated | |
| NAACP Image Awards | February 22, 2020 | Outstanding Actress in a Motion Picture | Alfre Woodard | Nominated | |
| NAACP Image Awards | February 22, 2020 | Outstanding Writing in a Motion Picture | Chinonye Chukwu | Nominated | |
| British Academy Film Awards | April 11, 2021 | Best Actress in a Leading Role | Alfre Woodard | Nominated | |

== See also ==
- List of black films of the 2010s
