= Jeffrey Hill =

British Scientist

Jeffrey Hill is a British scientist who is currently Vice President and Head of Biology, Center for Translational Research at the Shenzhen Bay Laboratory. He was formerly a Professor of Drug Discovery and director of the Sussex Drug Discovery Centre at the University of Sussex. He contributed to the discovery of Singapore's first publicly funded drug candidates during his time at the Agency for Science, Technology and Research (A*STAR).

== Education and early career ==
Hill worked as a Medical Laboratory Scientific Officer at Nevill Hall Hospital, Abergavenny, Wales before completing his university education at Cardiff University where his doctoral research focused on aspartic proteinases. He developed an interest in drug discovery for tropical diseases and after completing a WHO funded postdoctoral project on plasmodial proteinases in 1997, he became a Group Leader at Mahidol University. His research group focused on the characterisation of proteinases from a number of viruses including dengue.

== Career ==
In 1998, Hill returned to the United Kingdom and joined GlaxoSmithKline (GSK). He worked at the company for 8 years in both the Discovery Research and Genetics Research divisions where he was involved in target validation, assay development and biomarker discovery. He received the Scientific Impact Award at GSK for cloning a novel human GPCR and an Exceptional Science Award for the identification of novel biomarkers.

Hill left GSK in 2006 to join A*STAR's Bioinformatics Institute where he worked on gastric cancer biomarkers before helping Sir David Lane and Nobel Laureate Sydney Brenner establish the Experimental Therapeutics Centre (ETC), an A*STAR research institute focused on the discovery of drug candidates in 2007. Working with Alex Matter, Hill led the institute in putting three novel molecular entities into the clinic: a vaccine based on virus like particle technology, a MNK kinase inhibitor for blood cancers and a PORCN inhibitor for solid tumours. Other molecules discovered by his group have been used as chemical probes by other researchers to study autism and neurodegenerative diseases. His work at ETC led him to receive the Ministry of Trade and Industry's Borderless Award and substantial research funding (including S$10 million for a cancer companion diagnostics program).

Hill returned to the United Kingdom in 2019 to take up a position at the University of Sussex. While he was a Professor in the School of Life Sciences and director of the university's drug discovery department he led a number of ion channel projects and investigated EBV driven cancers, for which he received funding from the Wellcome Trust and Cancer Research UK.

In 2021, Hill moved to China to become Vice President at the Shenzhen Bay Laboratory. He is based at the Center for Translational Research where is Head of Biology and pursues targets in infectious diseases and oncology.
