= Bora Yoon (American musician) =

American composer

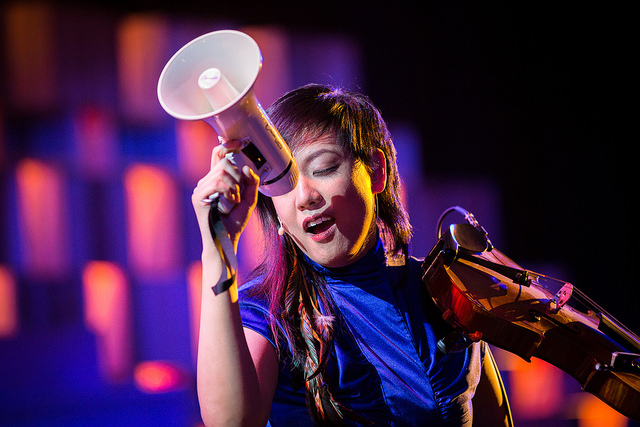
- Yoon in 2014
- Born: May 28 1980; Chicago, Illinois, US
- Education: Ithaca College; Princeton University
- Occupations: Composer; musician; sound artist; Assistant Professor at Reed College
- Website: www.borayoon.com

Bora Yoon is an American experimental electroacoustic composer and musician known for her use of unconventional instruments and musical technology in her music. An interdisciplinary sound artist, vocalist and TED2014 Fellow, she gathers and uses instruments and timbres from various centuries and cultures, to create immersive audiovisual experiences, with architecture, and acoustics. As of 2023, she is an Assistant Professor of Music at Reed College in Portland, Oregon.

== Early life ==
Bora Yoon was born in Chicago, Illinois. She completed her undergraduate studies at Ithaca College, and in 2023 earned a Ph.D. in Music Composition from Princeton University.

== Body of work ==
Yoon uses unconventional sound sources (everyday found objects, chamber instruments and digital devices) to generate music, and illuminate the invisibility of environment, sound, space, and architectural acoustics and psychoacoustics—to create a storytelling through sound.

In her work, she has used the human voice, violin/viola, water, ancient Tibetan singing bowls, cell phones, music boxes, glockenspiel, guitar, walkie talkies, metronomes, shortwave radios, kitchenware, found sounds, and electronics.

As a performer, Yoon has toured her experimental soundwork internationally at venues including the Lincoln Center, Brooklyn Academy of Music, the Singapore Arts Festival, Edinburgh International Festival, the KBS/Nam June Paik Museum in Seoul, the Festival of World Cultures (Poland), and various galleries, universities, and performing arts centers around the globe. She composes music/sound for film, theater, and dance, including an adaptation of Haruki Murakami's Wind-Up Bird Chronicle.

== Collaborations ==
Yoon's wide-ranging musical skills have yielded a diverse collection of collaborators across many genres and disciplines which include:

- Visual artists Ann Hamilton, and Seoul-based kinetic sculptor U-Ram Choe.
- Electronic artists: Iceland-based producer Ben Frost, DJ Spooky, King Britt
- Poet Sekou Sundiata
- indie guitarist Kaki King
- composers Michael Gordon, Christopher Bono, and composer/live visualist/ data artist R. Luke DuBois,
- Chamber ensembles SYMPHO, and early music group New York Polyphony
- Choral ensembles SAYAKA Ladies Consort of Tokyo, Voices of Ascension, and Musica Viva
- Dance collaborations include choreographers Noemie Lafrance, Yin Mei Dance.
- Korean traditional dance and drumming artist Vong Pak
- Multimedia London-based wax cylinder artist Aleks Kolkowski

== Spatial acoustic works ==
As a composer, notable spatial-acoustic works with unusual architecture include stereophonic sound mural "Doppler Dreams" for seven sopranos on bicycles in Brooklyn's 55,000 sq ft (5,100 m^{2}), empty McCarren Pool for the site-specific dance piece Agora II, and created and performed the multi-speaker live sound score for the aerial dance piece Rapture, reverberated off the dynamic curves of Frank Gehry's Fisher Center (Bard College) as part of a collaboration with award-winning choreographer Noémie Lafrance.

Choral commission "Semaphore Conductus" created for the Young People's Chorus of New York City is inspired by the conduction of energy, signals, and the evolution of communication devices (conch, gramophone, megaphone, cell phones) over the centuries. This is sung in surround-sound, creating an activated sound field for the audience, and lives between the space of a choral performance work, and sound installation.

== Multi-format releases ==
In 2014, Yoon published a multi-media release for master work 'Sunken Cathedral', which was first released as

- a limited-edition Double LP and digital release, co-produced with R. Luke DuBois
- an interactive graphic album for iPad with the GRALBUM Collective in Brooklyn NY
- a multimedia staged show, directed by Glynis Rigsby.

Inspired by turning the lens of architecture inward, to the architecture of the subconscious, and the mind. The album was a culmination of major works created from 2006 to 2013, and featured guest artists New York Polyphony and poet Sekou Sundiata.

The staged multimedia work, directed by Glynis Rigsby, reflects Buddhist philosophies of cycles and orbits as well as issues of identity Yoon’s Korean heritage. Featururing immersive video design by Adam Larsen, 'Sunken Cathedral' premiered the world stage to critical acclaim, and was presented by the Prototype Festival and LaMama Experimental Theater Club, and co-produced by HERE Art Center and Beth Morrison Projects.

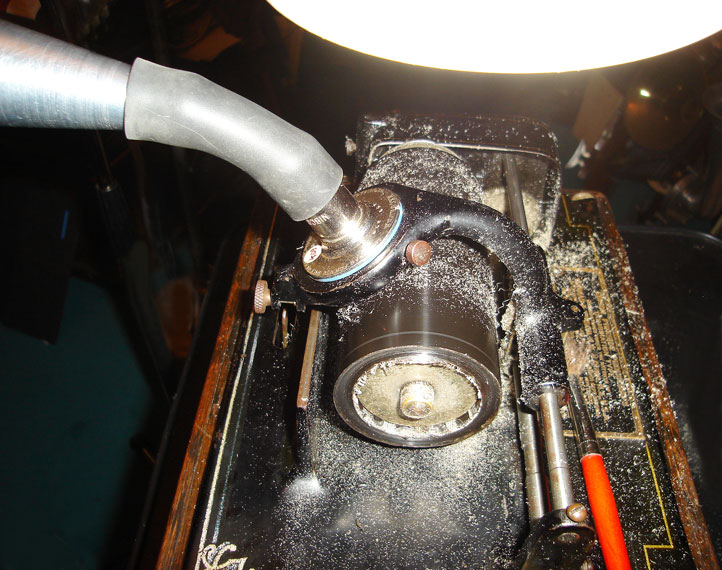
Yoon's 1930s Edison wax cylinder, being etched by phonograph artist Aleks Kolkowski

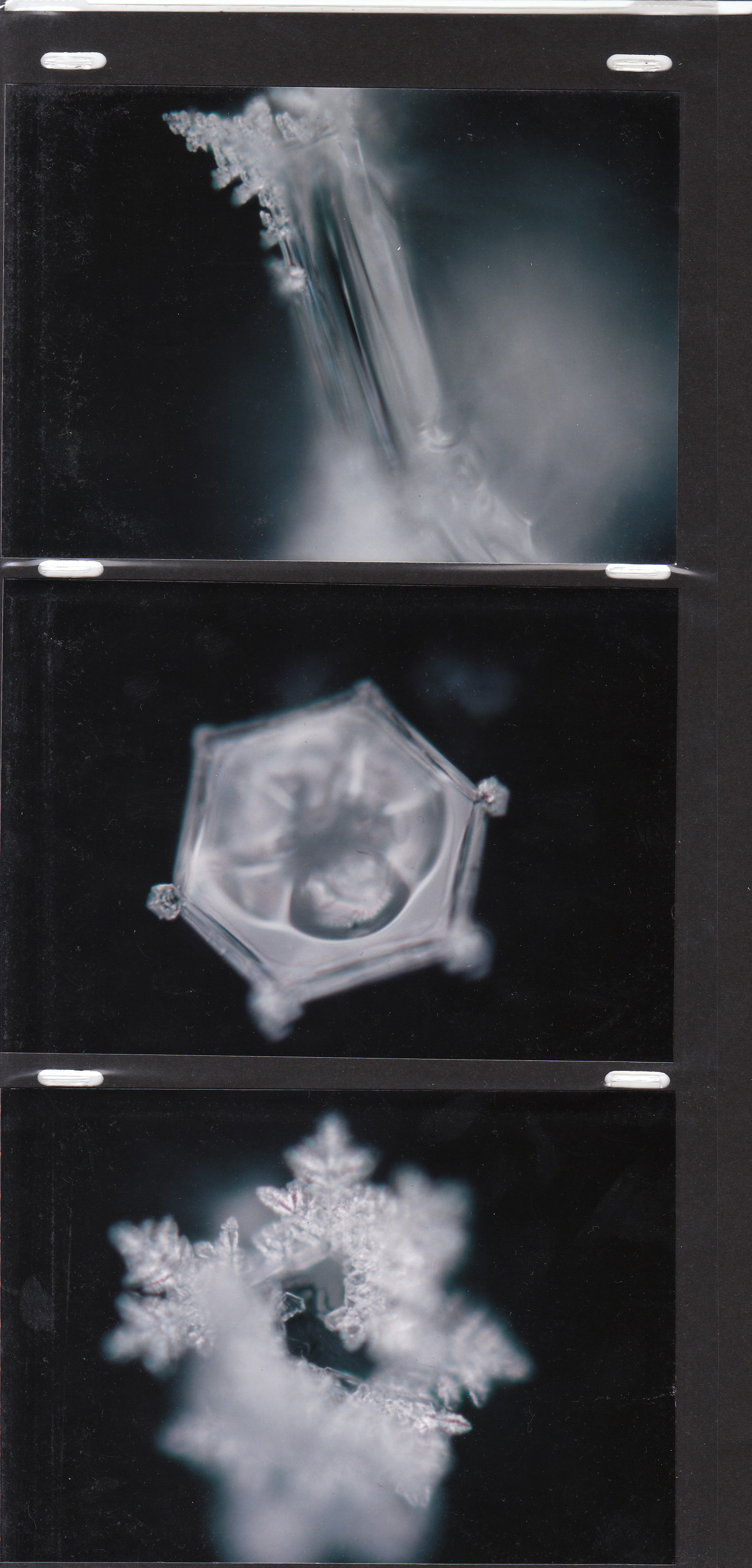
"Sons Nouveaux", from album ( (( PHONATION )) ) in frozen water form. A collaboration with IHM Labs, Tokyo, Dr. Emoto

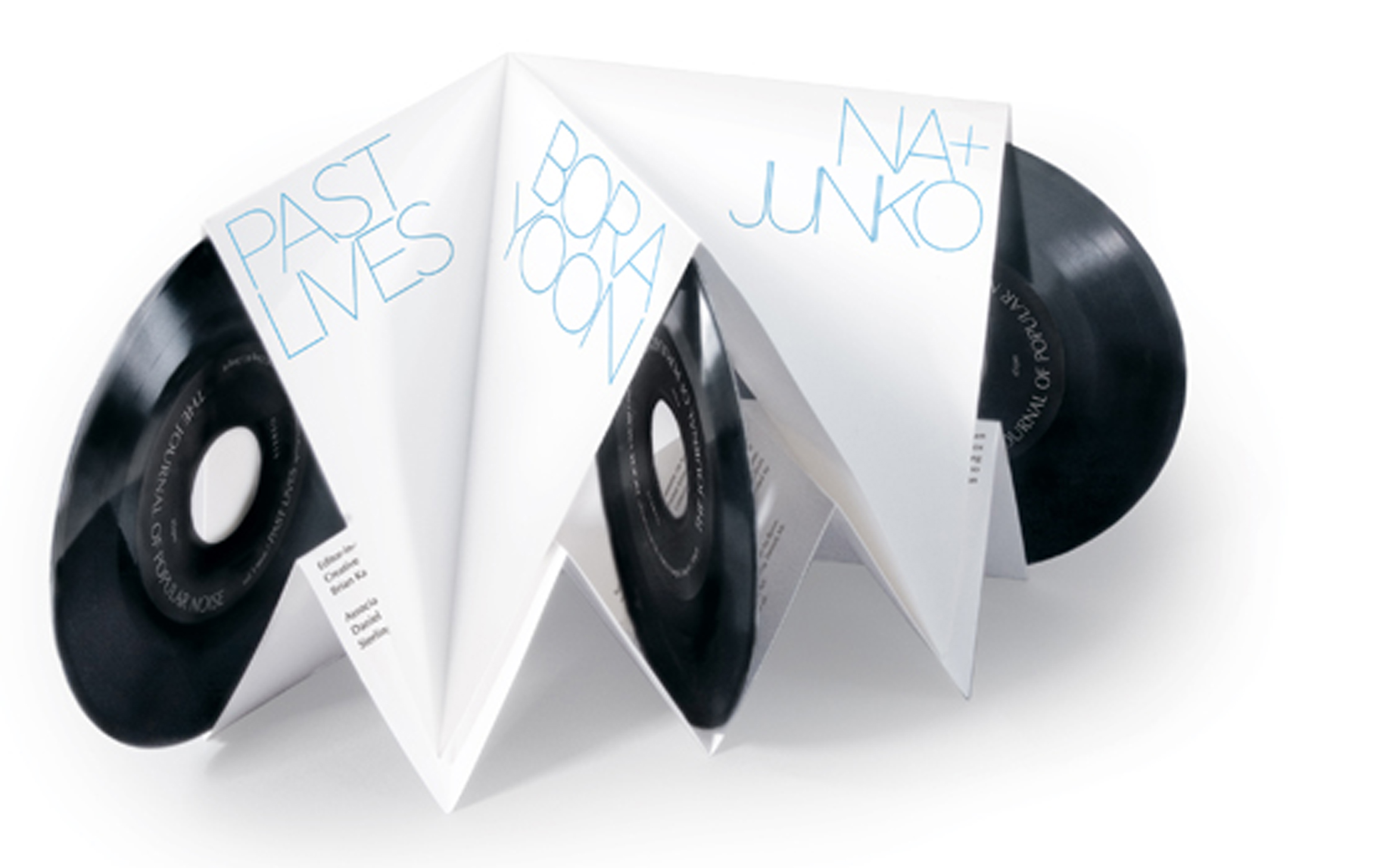
Journal of Popular Noise: an audio magazine on 7" LPs, a collaboration with Icelandic producer Ben Frost

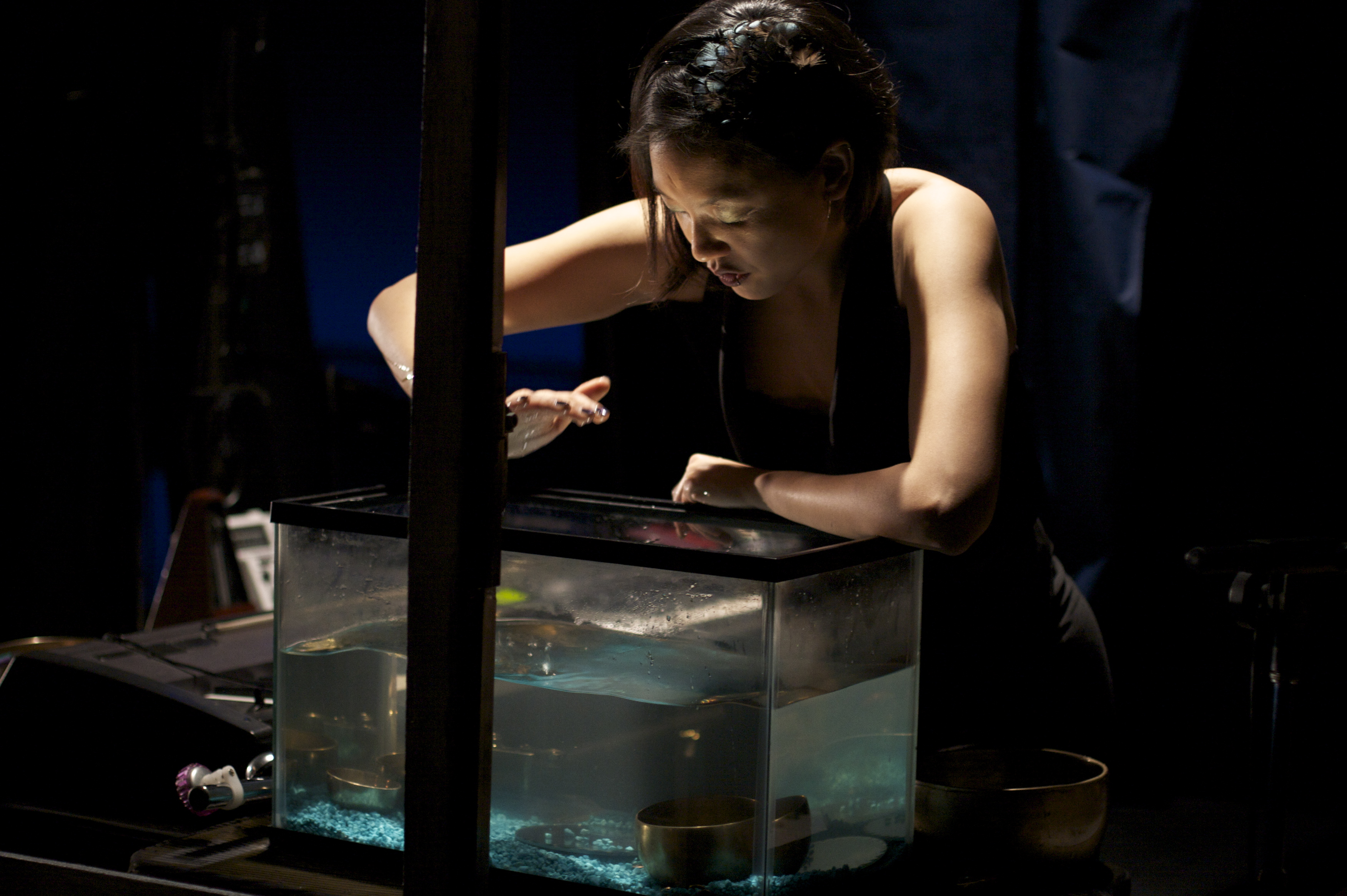
Yoon performs the live score for "Wind Up Bird Chronicle", directed by Stephen Earnhart

== Discography ==
- Sunken Cathedral (2014), Limited Edition 2LP vinyl (Innova Recordings)
- "Sunken Cathedral", interactive graphic album on iPad (The GRALBUM Collective)
- Bardot (2014) by composer Christopher Bono (My Silent Canvas)
- 1930's Edison wax cylinder "PLINKO" created with phonography artist Aleks Kolkowski
- NYFA Collection: 25 years of New York Foundation of the Arts fellows (Innova Recordings)
- Journal of Popular Noise (2008), Vol. 3, Issue 8, 7"45LP, collaboration electronic producer Ben Frost
- ( (( PHONATION )) ) (2008), 3rd solo record (Swirl Records)
- Sound UnBound (2008), Published by MIT Press, Music Compilation (SubRosa)
- Dreaming of Revenge (2008), guest artist on 'Air and Kilometers', Kaki King (Velour)
- Proscenium (2003), award-winning 2nd full-length solo album (Swirl Records)
- Bora Yoon (1999), debut solo album (Swirl Records)
