= Midwestern Gothic (musical) =

2017 musical

Midwestern Gothic is a horror musical with book and lyrics by Royce Vavrek and music and lyrics by Joshua Schmidt. The work was commissioned and premiered by Signature Theatre on March 28, 2017.

== Plot and influences ==
In a frozen little town in the middle of nowhere lives Stina, a young woman filled with a desperate hope to escape her humdrum surroundings. Following her mind's twisted flights of fancy, it isn't long before Stina's imagination is driving her to create more and more bizarre diversions, leading to a sudden and shocking twist of events.

The authors have suggested that this piece is influenced by their upbringings on the Canadian and American prairies, as well as the work of Sam Shepard, Andrea Arnold, Martin McDonagh and Catherine Breillat.

== Characters and original cast ==
Roles	Premiere cast, 28 March 2017 Music Director: Timothy Splain
Stina	Morgan Keene
Red	Timothy J. Alex
Deb	Sherri Edelen
Anderson	Sam Ludwig
Dwayne	Bobby Smith
LuAnn	Rachel Zampelli
Rodney (a hired boy)	Evan Casey
Evodio (a hired boy)	Jp Sisneros
DJ (a hired boy)	Chris Sizemore
Brett (a hired boy)	Stephen Gregory Smith

== Critical reception ==
In The Washington Post critic Peter Marks wrote "embedded in “Midwestern Gothic” are intriguing conceits, one of them being the ways in which the musical twists our perceptions of horror archetypes — in particular, that of the naive, imperiled ingenue. Here, she's anything but innocent, and in the casting of the persuasive Morgan Keene, the archetype is turned totally on its head: It's as if Ann-Margret had been chosen to play the role of Hannibal Lecter." But noted that he felt there was "work still to be done."

Talkin' Broadway wrote that "[i]t offers an unflinching look at the underside of rural America and the ways in which people break out when they have nothing to lose; as a mood piece, it isn't for everyone, but it's extremely well done." And Whisk and Quill noted "the musical is spellbindingly dark, think Truman Capote’s classic “In Cold Blood” and Vladimir Nabokov's “Lolita”, and yet utterly riveting."
