= Luna Pearl Woolf =

American composer (born 1973)

Luna Pearl Woolf (born 1973) is a Canadian-American composer, producer, and dramaturg. She has written opera, chamber music, orchestra, and choral compositions. Her works have been commissioned by Carnegie Hall, Washington National Opera, Tapestry Opera, Minnesota Sinfonia, Salle Bourgie, ECM+, Perelman Performing Arts Center, and the Concours Musical International de Montréal. She has collaborated with artists including Jeremy Irons, Cornelia Funke, Joyce DiDonato, Frederica von Stade, Royce Vavrek, Matt Haimovitz, and Evelyn Glennie.

In 2014 she was an inaugural recipient of Opera America's first grant for female composers.

== Biography ==
Luna Pearl Woolf was born in 1973 in Western Massachusetts. She received a Bachelor of Arts in music composition from Harvard University in 1996 and a Master of Arts in music composition from Smith College in 2002.

Woolf's principal composition teachers were Mario Davidovsky, Augusta Read Thomas, Lewis Spratlan, and Don Wheelock. Woolf was awarded the Ellen Taaffe Zwilich Prize from the International Alliance for Women in Music, the John Greene Scholarship and John Knowles Paine Fellowship from Harvard University and the Settie Lehman Fatman Prize from Smith College.

CBC Music named the recording Vagues et Ombres, which includes Woolf's 2022 work Contact, as their #1 Classical Album of the year, and the recording was nominated for a Juno Award. Her 2021 composer-portrait album, Luna Pearl Woolf: Fire and Flood (Pentatone Oxingale Series), was nominated for a Grammy Award for Best Classical Compendium.

She is director of creative development, opera creation forum director and artistic advisor at Musique 3 Femmes.

She currently resides in Montréal, Canada.

== Oxingale Productions ==
She is a co-founder of Oxingale Productions, which includes Oxingale Records and Oxingale Music, and is a recording producer with producing credits on Leaf, ATMA, Oxingale and Pentatone albums.

Along with cellist Matt Haimovitz, she created Oxingale Records, a sub-label of Pentatone, in 2000.

Oxingale Music is an independent music publisher launched in 2010 focusing on contemporary composers. Their catalog contains especially music for strings. Composers include Woolf, Lewis Spratlan, David Sanford, Anna Pidgorna, Matt Haimovitz, Thibault Bertin-Maghit and Niloufar Nourbakhsh.

== Critical response ==
=== Number Our Days ===
Number Our Days is a photographic oratorio based on Jamie Livingston's "Photo of the Day" with music by Luna Pearl Woolf and libretto and concept by David Van Taylor. The work was commissioned by the Perelman Performing Arts Center (PAC NYC), and was premiered April 12–14, 2024, conducted by Kamna Gupta, directed by Ty Defoe, and co-produced by Trinity Church Wall Street. Performers include countertenor John Holiday, the Choir of Trinity Wall Street, NOVUS NY, Trinity Youth Chorus, and Downtown Voices.

Anne E. Johnson called Woolf "the ideal composer because she is fluent in the language of many musical styles." Another reviewer called the oratorio "an accomplished musical composition that comfortably and confidently integrates various styles".

=== Jacqueline ===
Jacqueline is an opera in four movements for soprano and cello about the life of cellist Jacqueline du Pré. It was commissioned by Tapestry Opera for Matt Haimovitz and Marnie Breckenridge. It was nominated for five Dora Mavor Moore Awards, winning for outstanding performance by an individual (Marnie Breckenridge).

The Globe and Mail called it "an extraordinary piece, one that deserves an unquestioned place in the 21st-century canon." Schmopera wrote: "[G]o for the music, stay for everything else."

=== The Pillar ===
The Pillar was first performed by The Washington Chorus for its New Music for New Age Series on February 28, 2016. The performance was at the National Presbyterian Church, featuring cellist Matt Haimovitz, soprano Marnie Breckenridge, tenor Jonathan Blalock, and baritone James Shaffran, with The Washington Chorus directed by Julian Watchner. The Pillar is based on Diana B. Henriques' 2011 book The Wizard of Lies; Bernie Madoff and the Death of Trust.

Woolf was among the first recipient of the Opera America's Discovery Grant in 2014 to develop this work.

=== Angel Heart ===
Angel Heart is a children's story told in words and music which was first performed in September 2014 with narration by Jeremy Irons, with words by Cornelia Funke. The New York Times wrote: "Ms. Woolf's atmospheric music serves a different purpose [...] her compositions add psychological nuances and emotional depth through ever-changing textures."

=== Entanglement ===
Entanglement is a composition for a cello and percussion duo that was based on Woolf's previous composition Mélange à Trois. The piece was written for one player bowing the cello, and another stroking and caressing the cello. The Calgary Herald said: "[P]erhaps best summarized as an opera aria for cello, entangling a dramatic theatricality and an erotic intimacy between instrument and performer(s) [...], the discontinuous narrative was something to be experienced, and far less so to be analyzed."

== Notable works ==
- Number Our Days (2024), a photographic oratorio based on Jamie Livingston's "Photo of the Day" with libretto by David Van Taylor.
- Mar y sol (2023) for contralto and piano.
- l'Inconnu.e bouleversant.e (2023).
- Contact (2021) for string ensemble.
- Diaphanous Grace (2020) for solo cello, commissioned by The Primavera Project for Matt Haimovitz.
- Jacqueline (2019), an opera in four movements with libretto by Royce Vavrek.
- To the Fire (1994/rev. 2018) for six male voices or AATBBB choir a capella.
- Act Without Words I (2017), a musical adaptation of Samuel Beckett's Act Without Words I.
- Entanglement (2016) for cello and percussion, with choreography.
- Better Gods (2015), an opera about the abdication of Liliʻuokalani.
- The Pillar (2014), an opera about Bernie Madoff.
- Rumi: Quatrains of Love (2012) for soprano or mezzo-soprano, cello, and piano.
- Angel Heart: A Musical Storybook (2011), a spoken-word piece written with Cornelia Funke and narrated by Jeremy Irons.
- Après Moi, le Déluge (2006) for solo cello and SATB choir a cappella.

== Discography ==
- 1998 – Lemons Descending. Oxingale Records (OX2001). Epithalamion (1998) is recorded on this album.
- 2003 – Anthem. Oxingale Records (OX2004). Impromptu (2001) is recorded on this album.
- 2005 – Goulash!. Oxingale Records (OX2007). Romanian Folk Dances (arr. 2005) and Kashmir (arr. 2005) are recorded on this album.
- 2006 – Après Moi, le Déluge. Oxingale Records (OX2009). Après Moi, le Déluge (2006) and Orpheus on Sappho's Shore (2004) are recorded on this album.
- 2008 – Vinyl/Cello. Oxingale Records (OX2011). Après Moi, le Déluge (2006) is recorded on this album.
- 2009 – And if the song be worth a smile. Pentatone (PTC: 5186099). Odas de todo el mundo (2006) is recorded on this album.
- 2009 – Figment. Oxingale Records (OX2016). Sarabande (2009) is recorded on this album.
- 2013 – The Hours Begin to Sing. Pentatone (PTC: 5186429). Rumi: Quatrains of Love (2012) is recorded on this album.
- 2013 – Angel Heart: A Music Storybook. Oxingale Records (OX2023). "Angel Heart" (2011), "All Through the Night" (arr. 2011), "O Waly Waly" (arr. 2011), "Danny Boy" (arr. 2011), "The Adventurer" (arr. 2011), "O Absalom" (arr. 2011), "Ho Ho Wananay" (arr. 2011), "Sleep Baby Sleep" (arr. 2011), "Tiefer und Tiefer" (arr. 2011) are recorded on this album.
- 2015 – December Celebration – New Carols by Seven American Composers. Pentatone (PTC: 5186537). "How Bright the Darkness, a winter solstice carol" (2014) is recorded on this album.
- 2015 – Orbit. Pentatone Oxingale Series (PTC: 5186542). Sarabande (2009) and Helter Skelter (arr. 2012) are recorded on this album.
- 2016 – Overtures to Bach. Pentatone Oxingale Series (PTC: 5186561). Lili'uokalani (2015) is recorded on this album.
- 2018 – Angel Heart: A Music Storybook. Pentatone Oxingale Series (PTC: 5186731). "Angel Heart" (2011), "All Through the Night" (arr. 2011), "O Waly Waly" (arr. 2011), "Danny Boy" (arr. 2011), "The Adventurer" (arr. 2011), "O Absalom" (arr. 2011), "Ho Ho Wananay" (arr. 2011), "Sleep Baby Sleep" (arr. 2011), "Tiefer und Tiefer" (arr. 2011) are recorded on this album.
- 2019 – Ein Engel in der Nacht. Pentatone Oxingale Series (PTC: 5186798). "Angel Heart" (2011), "All Through the Night" (arr. 2011), "O Waly Waly" (arr. 2011), "Danny Boy" (arr. 2011), "The Adventurer" (arr. 2011), "O Absalom" (arr. 2011), "Ho Ho Wananay" (arr. 2011), "Sleep Baby Sleep" (arr. 2011), "Tiefer und Tiefer" (arr. 2011) are recorded on this album.
- 2019 – Cello Rock. Pentatone Oxingale Series (PTC: 2186801). Kashmir (arr. 2007) and Helter Skelter (arr. 2012) are recorded on this album.
- 2020 – Cello Jazz. Pentatone Oxingale Series (PTC: 5186929). Après Moi, le Déluge (2006) is recorded on this album.
- 2020 – Luna Pearl Woolf: Fire and Flood. Pentatone Oxingale Series (PTC: 5186803). To the Fire (1994/2008), ''Après Moi, le Déluge (2006), Missa in Fines Orbis Terrae (2017), One to One to One (2016), Who by Fire (arr. 2016) are recorded on this album.
- 2021 – Primavera I the wind. Pentatone Oxingale Series (PTC: 5186286). Diaphanous Grace (2020) is recorded on this album.
- 2022 – Vagues et ombres. Alpha Classics (ALPHA858). Contact (2021) is recorded on this album.
