= Joshua Schmidt =

Joshua Schmidt is an American composer, lyricist, bookwriter and theatrical sound designer. He is known for the musicals Adding Machine, A Minister's Wife, Midwestern Gothic, and musical film The End.

== Musical theatre ==
- Adding Machine (2007, Jason Loewith co-bookwriter, co-lyricist)
- A Minister's Wife (2009, Jan Tranen, lyricist; Austin Pendleton, bookwriter)
- Whida Peru: Resurrection Tango (2010, David Simpatico, book and lyrics)
- Midwestern Gothic (2017, Royce Vavrek bookwriter, co-lyricist)
