= Pig and Bear =

- Directed by: Royce Vavrek
- Release date: 2008
- Country: Canada
- Language: English

Pig and Bear is an experimental short film by Royce Vavrek, internationally screened throughout North America in 2008. Created while Vavrek was attending the Mel Hoppenheim School of Cinema at Concordia University, the film was distributed across the United States and Canada as part of North Country Cinema's TELEGRAMS from the New Canadian Cinema.

The film, a parody of 1970s pornography, follows a sexual encounter between two men dressed up in furry costumes who copulate in a variety of positions until the final shot of ejaculation. In his review for nytheatre.com, Martin Denton called the film "quite apt, with its soundtracklessness making it feel both subversive and seedy at the same time)"
