= Kansas City Choir Boy =

Off-Broadway play

Kansas City Choir Boy is an off-Broadway play that ran from 2015 to 2016. It was directed by Kevin Newbury and written by Todd Almond. The show featured Almond and Courtney Love in the lead roles. The play's theme is love altered by an unexpected fate. It evokes a mystery, which is told through flashbacks.

== Plot ==
In Kansas City Choir Boy, Courtney Love plays the muse Athena, while Todd Almond co-stars as a songwriter who recalls his turbulent relationship with the character of Love, who slips in and out of the musician's imagination as he tries to compose a song in tribute to her. He recalls his tempestuous youthful relationship with Athena, which began when they were teenagers and ended abruptly, leaving him with searing memories and emotional aftereffects that worsen after he discovers his beloved's mysterious death in faraway New York.

== Reception ==
Kansas City Choir Boy received favorable reviews, with great acclaim for Courtney Love's performance. Joe Bell, from Billboard, considered the piece a gem, highlighting Courtney Love's interpretation as impeccable, while Will Hermes, from Rolling Stone, defined the show as unsurprisingly awesome.

For Charles Isherhood of The New York Times, Love has a surprisingly smooth and fascinating presence, with transfixing gaze and stealthy movements, offering a performance that simultaneously contains an appeal, a wound and a threat. Charles McNulty of Los Angeles Times also praised the way Love imbues her performance with conflicting desires, painful regret, and tragic misfortune.
