= COSBI =

Italian nonprofit research center

Coordinates: 46.065872°N 11.154652°E

The Microsoft Research - University of Trento Centre for Computational and Systems Biology (COSBI) is a nonprofit research center in Trentino, Italy. Its first office opened on December 6, 2005, in Trento; the second opened in 2011 in Rovereto. It is a limited liability consortium, half owned by Microsoft Research Cambridge and half by the University of Trento.

== History ==
=== Origin ===
COSBI is a joint venture between Microsoft Research and the University of Trento. The founding agreement was signed in Prague on February 2, 2005, by the Minister of Education, University and Research (Minister Letizia Moratti), the Minister of Innovation and Technology (Minister Lucio Stanca), the Province of Trento (Gianluca Salvatori, Councillor of Planning, Research, and Innovation), the University of Trento (Davide Bassi, Rector), the Microsoft Corporation (Bill Gates, president and founder). COSBI was inaugurated on December 7, 2005.

=== Merging knowledge ===
COSBI celebrated its fifth anniversary by hosting the conference Merging Knowledge: Trento, Italy (November 30 – December 3, 2010). During the event scientific speakers discussed the relevance of computer science to the study of systems biology by exploring the main fields of computational and systems biology, as well as nutrigenomics, which merges personalized medicine with personalized diet. Among the lecturers: Tony Hoare, principal researcher at Microsoft Research; Leroy Hood, president of the Institute for Systems Biology; James Kaput, a director within the U.S. Food and Drug Administration; and Jeannette Wing, President’s Professor of Computer Science and department head of the School of Computer Science at Carnegie Mellon University.

== Research ==
COSBI is a multi-disciplinary group of researchers, software developers and analysts studying algorithmic systems biology through research, projects and solutions. It develops and applies programming language technologies to model, simulate and analyze complex biological systems.

== See also ==
- Systems biology
- List of systems sciences organizations
