= Dog Days (opera) =

Opera by David T. Little

Dog Days is an opera by David T. Little, to a libretto by Royce Vavrek after the short story by Judy Budnitz.

== Performance history ==
Dog Days was produced by Peak Performances at the Montclair State University (New Jersey) in association with Beth Morrison Projects, and had its world premiere run from September 29 to October 7, 2012. Robert Woodruff directed the production that starred Lauren Worsham and performance artist John Kelly. Scenic and video design was created by Jim Findlay, costume design by Vita Tzykun, and sound design by Matt Frey. Alan Pierson was the production's Musical Director and conductor, with new music ensemble Newspeak serving as the on-stage band.

Scenes from Dog Days premiered at Zankel Hall at Carnegie Hall on May 9, 2009, as part of the Dawn Upshaw and Osvaldo Golijov Young Artists Concert. Three arias from the opera-in-progress were subsequently presented by American Opera Projects at Galapagos Arts Space, including the world premiere of Mirror, Mirror performed by soprano Lauren Worsham.

In 2015, the work was staged at both the Fort Worth Opera and Los Angeles Opera with the original cast from the world premiere in Montclair. The work saw its New York City premiere at the Skirball Center for the Performing Arts during the 2016 Prototype Festival. The work's European premiere took place at Bielefeld Opera on February 27, 2016.

== Original cast recording ==
The original cast recording of Dog Days was released on VIA Records on September 9, 2016. Recorded live at REDCAT during the Los Angeles Opera presentation of the Beth Morrison Projects' production, the album was praised upon its release by WQXR in New York as "a fine document...captured with pristine clarity...(a) valuable addition to the 21st-century discography". It was subsequently named one of the "Best 50 Albums of 2016" by NPR Music, ranking at #19.

== Roles ==
Role	Voice type	Premiere cast, September 29, 2012 (Conductor: Alan Pierson)
Lisa	soprano	Lauren Worsham
Father (Howard)	baritone	James Bobick
Mother	soprano	Marnie Breckenridge
Elliot	tenor	Michael Marcotte
Pat	tenor	Peter Tantsits
Captain	mezzo-soprano	Cherry Duke
Prince	non-sung role	John Kelly

== Synopsis ==
The opera follows an American family in the near future who slowly starve as war rages. One day, a man in a dog suit arrives on their property howling for scraps.

== Reception ==
The New York Times stated: "It might all amount to mere provocation had Mr. Little and Mr. Vavrek not delivered a taut, nuanced work that clawed beneath the surface of every situation. Profanities pop like a string of firecrackers in Mr. Vavrek's libretto, yet its poetry is indelible and affecting. Mr. Little responded with music of emotional insight and charm, suggesting pop-music modes at times without ever resorting to pastiche. Harsh, angular lines and abrasive textures cede to wistful melodies and touches of hymnody; unorthodox instrumental techniques enhance mood without distracting."

The Wall Street Journal stated: "This gripping two-hour opera [...] wastes no time: A taut libretto and varied, original music deliver its grim story like a punch in the stomach."

The Star-Ledger stated: "The work seamlessly melds emerging and veteran artists with distinctive viewpoints and serious craft. Little's rhythmically driven score is stylistically diverse but cogent, fusing impeccable classical vocal writing, heavy metal, and musical theater. Royce Vavrek's libretto shifts from coarse, plainspoken banter to poetic musings."
