= Royce Vavrek =

Canadian-born librettist and writer

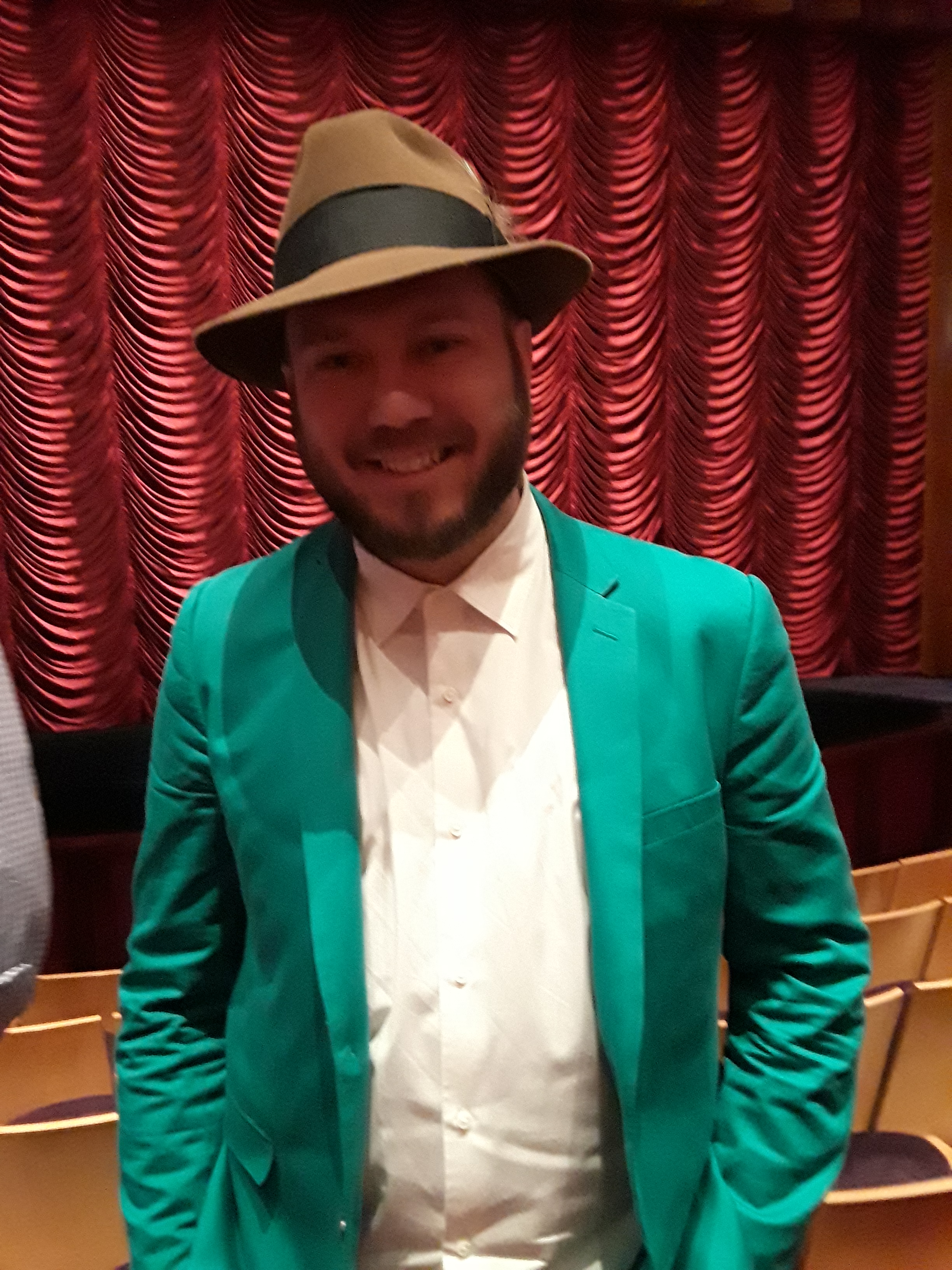
- Vavrek after the premiere of Proving Up, 2018
- Born: Grande Prairie, Alberta, Canada
- Citizenship: Canadian
- Education: Concordia University (BFA); New York University (MFA)
- Occupations: librettist, bookwriter, lyricist, filmmaker
- Years active: 2002–present
- Notable work: Dog Days, 27, Breaking the Waves, JFK, Angel's Bone

Royce Vavrek is a Canadian-born Brooklyn-based librettist, playwright, dance scenarist, musical theatre writer and filmmaker known for his collaborations with composers David T. Little, Missy Mazzoli, Mikael Karlsson, Ricky Ian Gordon, Paola Prestini and Du Yun, soprano Lauren Worsham, producers Beth Morrison and Lawrence Edelson, and conductors Steven Osgood, Julian Wachner and Alan Pierson.

He has been called "the indie Hofmannsthal", a "Metastasio of the downtown opera scene", "an exemplary creator of operatic prose", and "one of the most celebrated and sought after librettists in the world".

His opera Angel's Bone with composer Du Yun was awarded the 2017 Pulitzer Prize for Music.

== Life and work ==
Born in Grande Prairie, Alberta, Canada, Vavrek studied piano and musical composition in high school and also sang in a chorus, but was even more drawn to writing for theatre, writing some 17 plays at that time, and filmmaking. But following an undergraduate degree in filmmaking from Concordia University and a master's from New York University in musical theater writing, he enrolled in the American Lyric Theater's Composer Librettist Development Program which established his career as an opera librettist.

His work has been commissioned by the Metropolitan Opera, Opera Philadelphia, Houston Grand Opera, Washington National Opera, Norwegian National Opera, Opera Theatre of Saint Louis, Glimmerglass Opera, Tapestry Opera, Fort Worth Opera, Opera Omaha, Los Angeles Philharmonic, Brooklyn Philharmonic, The Kitchen, Alarm Will Sound, Opera America, American Lyric Theater, Beth Morrison Projects, Brooklyn Youth Chorus, among others. His recent commissions include operas for the Royal Swedish Opera, La Monnaie, The Icelandic Opera, and the Prototype Festival. Vavrek's filmmaking credits include From Sky and Soil, which was created as part of the Corus Young Filmmakers Initiative for broadcast on the W Network, through a prize administered by the Canadian Film and Television Production Association.

Vavrek is gay.

== Artistic influences and comparisons ==
Vavrek has suggested that his work is heavily influenced by cinematic auteurs including Neil LaBute, Lars von Trier, Catherine Breillat, Wong Kar-Wai, Mike Leigh, Larry Clark, playwrights Martin McDonagh and Sam Shepard, novelists Richard Ford, Miriam Toews and Larry McMurtry and Canadian singer-songwriter Kathleen Edwards.

His libretti have been compared to the work of Alban Berg, Maya Angelou and Edward Albee.

== Opera libretti ==
- Nora at the Altar-Rail (2008, Jay Anthony Gach composer)
- Vinkensport, or The Finch Opera (2010, David T. Little composer)
- Song from the Uproar: The Lives and Deaths of Isabelle Eberhardt (2012, Missy Mazzoli composer, co-librettist)
- Dog Days (2012, David T. Little composer)
- 27 (2014, Ricky Ian Gordon composer)
- Maren of Vardø: Satan's Bride (2015, Jeff Myers composer)
- O Columbia (2015, Gregory Spears composer)
- Angel's Bone (2016, Du Yun composer)
- JFK (2016, David T. Little composer)
- Breaking the Waves (2016, Missy Mazzoli composer)
- The House Without a Christmas Tree (2017, Ricky Ian Gordon composer)
- Proving Up (2018, Missy Mazzoli composer)
- Silent Light (2019, Paola Prestini composer)
- The Wild Beast of the Bungalow (2020, Rachel Peters composer)
- Jacqueline (2020, Luna Pearl Woolf composer)
- The Puppy Episode (2021, Matthew Recio composer)
- The Listeners (2022, Missy Mazzoli composer)
- The Thrilling Adventures of Lovelace and Babbage (2023, Elena Ruehr composer)
- Melancholia (2023, Mikael Karlsson composer)
- The Old Man and the Sea (2023, Paola Prestini composer)
- Adoration (2024, Mary Kouyoumdjian composer)
- Fanny and Alexander (2024, Mikael Karlsson composer)
- Kimberly Dunbar (2026, Sarah Slean composer)
- The Galloping Cure (2026, Missy Mazzoli composer)
- Lincoln in the Bardo (2026, Missy Mazzoli composer)
- Red Fox (2027, Du Yun composer)
- Indians on Vacation (TBA, Ian Cusson composer)

== Dance scenarios ==
- Crypto (2019, Guillaume Coté choreographer, Mikael Karlsson composer)
- Evidence of it All (2021, Drew Jacoby choreographer, Mikael Karlsson composer, Rosamund Pike narrator)

== Musical theater book and lyrics ==
- Midwestern Gothic (2017, Joshua Schmidt composer, co-lyricist)

== Oratorios, cantatas, and song cycles ==
- Am I Born (2012, David T. Little composer)
- Stoned Prince (2013, Hannah Lash composer)
- Naamah's Ark (2016, Marisa Michelson composer)
- The Hubble Cantata (2016, Paola Prestini composer)
- Epistle Mass (2018, Julian Wachner composer)
- So We Will Vanish (2021, Mikael Karlsson composer)

== Selected songs and concert works ==
- Hybrid Dreams (Bunny Pony) (2007, Julia Meinwald, composer)
- Elena (2009, Matt Marks, composer)
- Red-Thread Smirk (2010, Matt Marks, composer)
- I [XX] (2011, Matt Marks, composer)
- A Song for Wade (This is Not That Song) (2011, Matt Marks, composer)
- 1882 Songs (2011, Mark Baechle, composer)
- Last Nightfall (2011, David T. Little, composer)
- Canvas (2012, Matt Mehlan, composer)
- archaeology (2012, David T. Little, composer)
- Bluetooth Islands (2012, Matt Marks, composer)
- A Mural (2012, Aaron Gervais, composer)
- Alien Summers (2012, Aaron Roche, composer)
- Monkey Cowboys (2012, Rachel Peters, composer)
- Violations (2013, Hannah Lash, composer)
- Strip Mall (2013, Matt Marks, composer)
- Penance (2013, Mikael Karlsson, composer)
- The Librettist as a Boy (2013, Marie Incontrera, composer)
- Brother (2013, Jude Vaclavik, composer)
- E---- (2014, Jeff Myers, composer)
- Union (2014, Paola Prestini, composer)
- Knoxville: Summer of 2015 (2015, Ellen Reid, composer; a musical sequel to Samuel Barber's Knoxville: Summer of 1915)

== Films ==
- Sacrifice (2003)
- Good Woman (2004)
- From Sky and Soil (2005)
- I Will Not Be Sad Anymore (2005)
- Pig and Bear (2008)

== Awards and nominations ==
Year	Award	Category	Work	Result
2017	Music Critics Association of North America Award	Best New Opera	Breaking the Waves	Won
2019	Music Critics Association of North America Award	Best New Opera	Proving Up	Runner-up
2020	Dora Mavor Moore Awards	Outstanding New Opera	Jacqueline	Nominated
2023	American Academy of Arts and Letters	Marc Blitzstein Memorial Award		Won
2025	International Opera Awards	Best World Premiere	Silent Light	Nominated
2026	Dora Mavor Moore Awards	Outstanding New Opera	Canuck Cantatas	Won
2026	International Opera Awards	Best World Premiere	The Galloping Cure	Nominated

== The Coterie ==
With soprano Lauren Worsham, Vavrek is the co-founder and co-artistic director of downtown opera-theater company The Coterie. Through a series of concerts that often function as incubators for larger projects, the company has presented world premieres by many young operatic and musical theater composers including Rachel Peters, Jeff Myers, Kyle Jarrow, Paola Prestini, Cristian Amigo, Matt Marks, Mark Baechle, Christine Donkin, Joshua Schmidt, Julia Meinwald and Andrew Gerle. In December 2012, the company will premiere new works by Aaron Roche, Mel Marvin, Zach Redler, Aaron Gervais and Conrad Winslow alongside new projects from many returning contributors. Among the many performers to lend their talents to the company are Tony Award-winner Chuck Cooper, Tony nominee Barbara Walsh, actress-singers Theresa McCarthy and Morgan James and actor-singers Greg Hildreth and Zachary James.
