= Bioinformatics Institute (Singapore) =

Singaporean research institute

Agency overview
- Formed: 2001
- Headquarters: 30 Biopolis Street, #07-01 Matrix, S(138671)
- Agency executive: Dr Frank EISENHABER, Executive Director
- Parent agency: Agency for Science, Technology and Research
- Website: www.bii.a-star.edu.sg

The Bioinformatics Institute (Abbreviation: BII) is one of the Biomedical Sciences Institutes of the Agency for Science, Technology and Research, (A*STAR). BII was originally founded in 2001 by Dr Rajagopal as a support unit for Bioinformatics and IT service management. However, since August 2007, it has been redefined as a biological research organisation upon the arrival of the current executive director, Dr Frank Eisenhaber. BII focuses on "computationally biology-driven life science research aimed at the discovery of biomolecular mechanisms." BII also develops computer based research tools and performs experimental verifications in its own experimental facilities or by collaborating with appropriate groups.

BII is home to the journal Scientific Phone Apps and Mobile Devices with SpringerNature.

There are currently four research divisions in BII:

- Biomolecular Sequence to Function
- Biomolecular Modelling and Design
- Imaging Informatics
- Translational Research

Under Dr. Sebastian Maurer-Stroh, the team at BII quality-checked genomic sequences uploaded by various countries to the GISAID database that stores and shares COVID-19 virus data.
