= David T. Little =

American composer and drummer (born 1978)

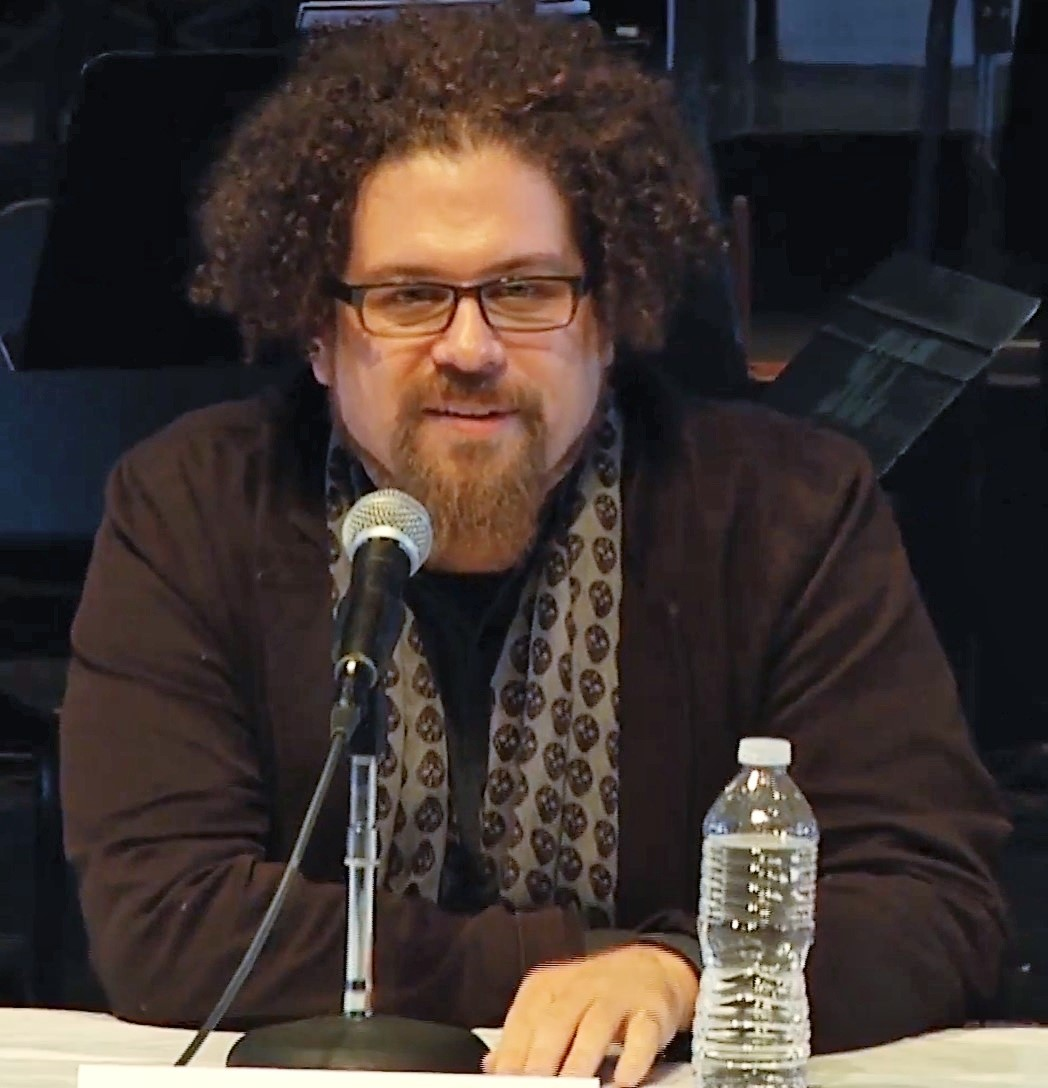
- Little at the 2015 Cabrillo Festival of Contemporary Music
- Born: New Jersey
- Education: University of Michigan, Princeton
- Occupation: composer
- Notable work: Dog Days, Soldier Songs, JFK

David T. Little (born October 25, 1978) is an American composer, record producer, and drummer known for his operatic, orchestral, and chamber works, most notably his operas JFK, Soldier Songs, and Dog Days which was named a standout opera of recent decades by The New York Times. He is the artistic director of Newspeak, an eight-piece amplified ensemble that explores the boundaries between rock and classical music, and is the Chair of the composition faculty at Mannes School of Music.

== Biography ==
Raised in Blairstown, New Jersey, Little attended North Warren Regional High School, where he performed in school musicals.

Little's music has been performed throughout the world—including in Dresden, London, Leipzig, Edinburgh, Zürich, San Francisco, Chicago, Los Angeles, Montreal, and at the Tanglewood, Aspen, MATA, Cabrillo and Holland Festivals—by such performers as the London Sinfonietta, Alarm Will Sound, eighth blackbird, So Percussion, wild Up, ensemble courage, Dither, NOW Ensemble, PRISM Quartet, the New World Symphony, Third Coast Percussion, Beth Morrison Projects, Peak Performances, American Opera Projects, the New York City Opera, the Grand Rapids Symphony and the Baltimore Symphony Orchestra under Marin Alsop. He has received awards and recognition from the American Academy of Arts and Letters, the Mid Atlantic Arts Foundation, Meet The Composer, the American Music Center, the Harvey Gaul Competition, BMI, and ASCAP, and has received commissions from Carnegie Hall, Kronos Quartet, Maya Beiser, the Baltimore Symphony, the Albany Symphony Orchestra, the New World Symphony, Pittsburgh New Music Ensemble, the University of Michigan, and Dawn Upshaw's Vocal Arts program at the Bard College Conservatory of Music, among others.

Recent projects include the operas JFK (Thaddeus Strassberger, director; Royce Vavrek, librettist), and Dog Days (Robert Woodruff, director; Royce Vavrek, librettist), Haunt of Last Nightfall for Third Coast Percussion, AGENCY, commissioned by the Kronos Quartet as part of its 40th anniversary season, Ghostlight—ritual for six players for eighth blackbird, dress in magic amulets, dark, from My feet for the combined forces of The Crossing and International Contemporary Ensemble. Upcoming works include: a new work for the London Sinfonietta, the theater work Black Lodge, with a libretto by legendary Outrider poet Anne Waldman, a new work being developed as part of The Metropolitan Opera and Lincoln Center Theater's new works program, and several unannounced projects. Little's and the sky was still there was released Todd Reynold's Outerborough, on Innova records. Hellhound, commissioned by Maya Beiser for her "All Vows" and "Uncovered" tours, has been included on her TranceClassical album.

Little holds degrees from Susquehanna University (2001), the University of Michigan (2002) and Princeton University (PhD, 2011), and his primary teachers have included Osvaldo Golijov, Paul Lansky, Steven Mackey, William Bolcom, and Michael Daugherty. He has taught music in New York City through Carnegie Hall's Musical Connections program, served as the inaugural Digital Composer-in-Residence for the UK-based DilettanteMusic.com. He is a founder of the annual New Music Bake Sale, and served as the Executive Director of New York's MATA Festival from 2010 until 2012. From 2014-2017 he served as Composer-in-Residence with Opera Philadelphia and Music-Theatre Group, and since 2015 has served on the composition faculty at Mannes School of Music in New York City. His music is published by Boosey & Hawkes.

== Compositions ==
Stage Works

Soldier Songs: A 60-minute multimedia work for baritone and amplified septet composed in 2006, the opera Soldier Songs explores the perceptions versus the realities of a soldier, the exploration of loss and exploitation of innocence, and the difficulty of expressing the truth of war. Soldier Songs was nominated for a Grammy Award in the Best Opera Recording category.

Am I Born: The 30-minute oratorio for soprano, children's chorus and orchestra, Am I Born, premiered in 2012 as part of "Brooklyn Village", a multi-media concert co-produced and presented by the Brooklyn Philharmonic, Brooklyn Youth Chorus and Roulette. Alan Pierson conducted the Brooklyn Philharmonic, soprano Mellissa Hughes and members of both the Brooklyn Youth Chorus and BYCA's Young Men's Ensemble. A new SATB version of the work was commissioned and premiered by Julian Wachner and The Choir of Trinity Wall Street in 2019 as part of the Prototype Festival.

Vinkensport, or The Finch Opera: Commissioned and premiered in 2010 by Bard College Conservatory of Music, Vinkensport, or The Finch Opera is a one-act operatic comedy about the Flemish folk-sport of finch-sitting. The piece was subsequently featured in New York City Opera's VOX: Contemporary Opera Lab, and was staged by soprano Lauren Flanigan at Shenandoah Conservatory. A new chamber version of the opera was commissioned by Opera Saratoga in 2018, and was turned into a film by Houston Grand Opera in 2020.

Dog Days: The first full-length collaboration with Royce Vavrek yielded the three-act opera Dog Days which premiered at Peak Performances @ Montclair State in association with Beth Morrison Projects on September 29, 2012, in a staging by director Robert Woodruff. The work starred Lauren Worsham as Lisa, a 13-year-old girl who befriends a man in a dog suit begging for scraps during a post-apocalyptic wartime scenario. Ronni Reich of The Star-Ledger wrote of Little's score: "Little's music thrashes, with dark, epic, chaotic heavy rock inspiration meeting lurching, bellowed vocal lines. ... [it is] stylistically diverse but cogent, fusing impeccable classical vocal writing, heavy metal, and musical theater."

The piece began as a commission from Carnegie Hall when Little was chosen to compose a 20-minute work of music theater as part of Dawn Upshaw and Osvaldo Golijov's workshop in collaboration with singers from Bard Conservatory. Alan Pierson, the conductor of the performance at Zankel Hall returned to conduct Newspeak for the world premiere production in New Jersey.

JFK: Little's follow-up to Dog Days with librettist Royce Vavrek is a grand opera commissioned by Fort Worth Opera, American Lyric Theater and Opéra de Montréal that focuses on the night before John F. Kennedy's assassination in 1963. JFK premiered in Fort Worth, Texas, in April 2016. It later traveled to Opéra de Montréal in 2018, and received its European Premiere at Staattheater Augsburg in 2019.

Black Lodge: The first collaboration between Little and poet Anne Waldman, Black Lodge is an industrial opera in three parts. Created for rock band Timur and the Dime Museum, it was commissioned and produced by Beth Morrison Projects, and premiered in October, 2022 at Opera Philadelphia in a film-based production directed by Michael Joseph McQuilken. Black Lodge received a 2024 Grammy Award Nomination in the Best Opera Recording category. Its European premiere took place at the 2024 O. Festival in Rotterdam, as recipient of the 2023 Music Theatre Now Competition.

SIN-EATER: a "ritual grotesquerie" for 24 voices and string quartet, SIN-EATER was commissioned and premiered by The Crossing at Penn Live Arts in September 2023, conducted by Donald Nally. Drawing on historical accounts of the sin-eater as a way to explore social inequities in contemporary culture, the libretto was fashioned by the composer from texts by Jean Anthelme Brillat-Savarin, Stephen Crane, Wilfred Owen, Harold McGee, Anne Elizabeth Moore, Jonathan Swift, Claude McKay, and others. Using "jarring transitions and juxtapositions," SIN-EATER was called, "a broad, nuanced, and often profoundly unsettling examination of how some members of society are compelled to absorb toxicity and terror so that others can live free and unharmed."

What Belongs to You: What Belongs to You is an operatic adaptation of the novel by Garth Greenwell, commissioned by Alarm Will Sound and the Modlin Center for the Arts. Scored for solo tenor and an orchestra of sixteen, the work had its world premiere in September 2024 at the Modlin Center for the Arts at the University of Richmond, starring Karim Sulayman and directed by Mark Morris. It was awarded the 2025 Music Critics Association of North America Award for Best New Opera.

Orchestral and Large Ensemble Works

- 1986 (2018) for string orchestra
- The Conjured Life (2017) for orchestra
- dress in magic amulets, dark, from My feet (2016) for choir and ensemble
- HAUNTED TOPOGRAPHY (2013) for orchestra
- Screamer! - a three-ring blur for orchestra (arr. 2013) for chamber orchestra
- CHARM (2011) for orchestra
- RADIANT CHiLD (2011) concertino for percussion and chamber orchestra
- haunted topography (2011) for sinfonietta
- Conspiracy Theory (2010) for big band
- The Closed Mouth Speaks (2009) for baritone and orchestra
- East Coast Attitude (2006) for symphonic band
- Immolation (2003) - for orchestra
- Valuable Natural Resources (2004) for sinfonietta
- how we got here (fourth evolution) (2003) for thirteen players
- Screamer! - a three-ring blur for orchestra (2002) for orchestra

Chamber and Solo Works

- A Bliss of Birds (2022) for solo clarinet
- Hang Together (2022) for solo piano
- out here beyond the world (2021) for solo clarinet
- The Crocus Palimpsest (2021) for solo cello
- the earthen lack (2017) suite for solo cello
- Accumulation of Purpose (2017) six studies for solo piano
- Elegy (monsters are real) (2016) for solo piano
- Ghostlight - ritual for six players (2015) for sextet
- Hellhound (2013) for solo cello, bass, drums, and electronics
- AGENCY (2013) for string quartet and electronics
- and the sky was still there (2012) version for electric cello and playback
- Haunt of Last Nightfall (2010) for percussion quartet and electronics
- raw power (2010) for saxophone quartet
- and the sky was still there (2010) for electric violin and playback
- 1986 (2009) for string quartet
- Musik für den Schultheiß (2006/2009) for string quartet
- Shock Doctrine (2009) for solo snare drum
- Spalding Gray (2008) for flute, clarinet, piano, electric, contrabass
- sweet light crude (2007) for soprano and ensemble
- Tricky Bits (2007) for rock band
- Music for The Musical Illusionist (2007) for string quartet and electronics
- Three Sams (etudes) (2007) for solo percussion
- oh Gott, es regnet (2006) for electric guitar quartet
- Red Scare Sketchbook (2005) for saxophone and percussion
- Electric Proletariat (2005) for Newspeak
- descanso (waiting) (2004-2005) for flute, clarinet, violin, cello, percussion
- descanso (after omega) (2004) for solo clarinet and ensemble
- Speak Softly (2004) for four percussionists playing sticks of varying bigness
- for Amos (2004) for piano trio
- Piano Trio (2003-2004)
- Sunday Morning Trepanation (2002) for mixed quartet and playback
- hope in the proles. (2002) for sextet

Vocal Works

- SIN-EATER (2023) - for choir (doubling synth and percussion) and string quartet
- Archaeology (2020) - for mezzo-soprano and string quintet – text by Royce Vavrek
- Lessons (2019) for baritone and piano - text by Walt Whitman
- hold my tongue (2018) for voice and track
- Eleven Fragments for the Book of Dreams (2017) for solo baritone or mezzo-soprano voice – text by Sonja Krefting
- The Three Ravens (2016) for vocal trio or choir with bass instrument
- archaeology (2012) for mezzo-soprano voice and piano – text by Royce Vavrek
- Last Nightfall (2011) for soprano and ensemble – text by Royce Vavrek
- To A Stranger (2010) for baritone and piano – text by Walt Whitman
- sweet light crude (2007) for soprano and ensemble
- Songs of Love, Death, Friends and Government (2004) for soprano, clarinet, and violin

== Awards ==
- 2002 BMI Student Composer Award
- 2003 Charles Ives Prize
- 2004 BMI Student Composer Award
- 2005 Harvey Bartlett Gaul Prize
- 2006 ASCAP Morton Gould Young Composer Award
- 2022 Grammy Award Nomination for Best Opera Recording, Soldier Songs
- 2022 International Opera Awards, Shortlist for Best Digital Opera, Soldier Songs
- 2022 Opera America Award for Excellence in Digital Opera for Soldier Songs
- 2023 Music Theatre Now Competition Winner, Black Lodge
- 2024 Grammy Award Nomination for Best Opera Recording, Black Lodge
- 2025 Music Critics Association of North America Award for Best New Opera, What Belongs to You
