= Jeff Myers (composer) =

American composer (born 1977)

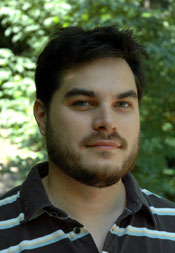
- Born: August 11, 1977 (age 48); Fremont, California
- Education: San Jose State University
- Alma mater: University of Michigan
- Occupation: Composer
- Spouse: JoAnn Garcia
- Children: Maximilian August Myers
- Website: jeffmyersmusic.com

Jeff Myers (born August 11, 1977) is an American composer.

== Early life ==
Born and raised in Fremont, California, Myers attended San Jose University (earning a Bachelor of Music degree), the Eastman School of Music (earning a Master of Arts degree), and the University of Michigan (earning a Doctor of Musical Arts degree while studying composition under Pulitzer Prize and Grammy Award-winning composer and pianist William Bolcom and Grammy Award-winning composer Michael Daugherty).

== Career ==
In 2011, Grammy Award-winning violinist Hilary Hahn invited composers to submit pieces for inclusion on her In 27 Pieces: The Hilary Hahn Encores Album. From more than 400 submissions, Hahn chose Myers's "The Angry Birds of Kauai" to perform as the 27th and final track. The album was released in 2013.

Myers's work has been presented at Carnegie Hall, the Library of Congress, Walt Disney Concert Hall, Kimmel Center, Darmstadt, Het Muziekgebouw aan ‘t IJ, Bard College, the Institute for Advanced Study, and Poisson Rouge, amongst others.

Noted collaborators and commissioners include the New York City Opera, Beth Morrison Projects, Orchestre national de Lorraine, the Ann Arbor Symphony Orchestra, the University of Michigan Symphonic Band, Transit, The JACK Quartet, the PRISM Quartet, pianist Ralph van Raat, pipa virtuoso Yang Jing, violinist Yuki Numata, hornist Laura Klock, tenor William Hite, librettist Royce Vavrek, and librettist Quincy Long.
