= Lauren Worsham =

American actress and singer (born 1982)

- Born: April 4, 1982 (age 44); Austin, Texas, United States
- Genres: Opera, glam rock, broadway, rock
- Occupations: Singer-songwriter, actress
- Years active: 2005–present

Lauren Tolbert Worsham (born April 4, 1982) is an American actress and singer known for her work in the opera and musical theatre. She received a Tony Award nomination for Best Featured Actress in a Musical for her role in A Gentleman's Guide to Love and Murder. She is also known for being the lead singer of the band Sky-Pony, which has released two albums with original songs titled "Say You Love Me Like You Mean It" and "Raptured Live".

== Early life and education ==
Worsham is the daughter of Belinda (née Petty) and Dennis Worsham, who works in real estate. She was raised in Austin, Texas, United States, where she attended Westlake High School. She graduated from Yale University with a degree in Spanish. While at Yale, she was involved with theatre and music, and performed with the acapella group, Shades. During a summer at Yale she traveled to Scotland to perform theatre at the Edinburgh Fringe Festival. She has a brother, Parker Ainsworth, who is also a musician.

== Career ==
=== Theatre ===
One of Worsham's first jobs was in 2005 working at the Shubert Theatre during Spamalot. She also worked for several years as a personal assistant for Tony winning Broadway producer Ruth Hendel. In 2006, she played the role of Olive Ostrovsky in the first national tour of The 25th Annual Putnam County Spelling Bee that was played on Broadway by Celia Keenan-Bolger.

In 2008, she was cast as Cunégonde in the New York City Opera production of Candide and also played Clara Johnson in the Weston Playhouse production of The Light in the Piazza. In 2009, Worsham competed in the Lotte Lenya Singing Competition, placing second. Also in 2009 she appeared in the Paper Mill Playhouse production of Master Class as Sophie de Palma and in Kansas City Rep's production of Into the Woods as Cinderella.

In 2010, she played the lead role of Lili Daurier in Carnival! at the Goodspeed Opera House. In 2012, Worsham earned critical acclaim for originating the role of Lisa in the opera Dog Days and in 2013 she played Flora in the New York City Opera's production of The Turn of the Screw.

In 2014 she made her Broadway debut as Phoebe D'Ysquith in A Gentleman's Guide to Love and Murder, for which she was nominated for the 2014 Tony Award for Best Featured Actress in a Musical. Worsham won the 2014 Drama Desk Award for Outstanding Featured Actress in a Musical (in a tie with Anika Larsen) for this role. In November 2014 she made her New York Philharmonic debut as Magnolia in a revival of Kern and Hammerstein's Show Boat.

Worsham created a theatre company titled The Coterie with Royce Vavrek that creates and performs original works.

=== Film ===
Worsham appeared in The Last Day of August as Lisa and Saint Janet as Kim.

== Personal life ==
In 2011, she married Kyle Jarrow. The couple are frequent collaborators and reside in Brooklyn, New York. In December 2015, Worsham and Jarrow announced they were expecting their first child.
