= Tapestry Opera =

Canadian opera company in Toronto, Ontario

Coordinates: 43.6456°N 79.4027°W

- Interactive map of Tapestry Opera
- Address: 9 Trinity Street, Studio 316, Distillery District; Toronto, Ontario; Canada

Construction
- Opened: 1979

Website
- tapestryopera.com

Tapestry Opera is a Canadian opera company located in Toronto, Ontario. According to its website, it is "the only Canadian company solely dedicated to the creation and performance of original Canadian opera". To date, the company has produced 18 full-length world premieres and 160 world premieres of opera shorts. It has been nominated for 61 Dora Mavor Moore Awards and won 20. It is Canada's largest producer of contemporary opera.

The opera was founded in 1979 by Wayne Strongman, who was the company's Artistic Director until 2013, when he resigned after a period of internal strife. He was replaced by Michael Hidetoshi Mori, who is the current Artistic and General Director. In 2009, Strongman was appointed to the Order of Canada for his contribution to Canadian culture.

== History ==
Tapestry Opera began as a Madrigal ensemble called The Tapestry Singers. In 1986, it was renamed Tapestry Music Theatre to reflect changes in the company's direction. In 1999, the company was re-branded as Tapestry New Opera Works to reflect its dedication to the creation of contemporary opera, and now operates as Tapestry Opera.

Tapestry has been an influence on the development of opera on an international level. Rather than bringing in musicians and performers as needed and producing operas as one-off productions, Strongman developed a continuous method where artists and musicians are nurtured and introduced to opera while new operas are in the process of being produced.

In 2010, for Toronto's Luminato Festival, Tapestry Opera collaborated with the Gryphon Trio and the Elmer Iseler Singers to record the album Dark Star Requiem, an Oratorio on the history of HIV/AIDS. The album was released in 2016. At the Juno Awards of 2017, the album was nominated as Classical Album of the Year – Vocal or Choral Performance. Its composer, Andrew Staniland, received a nomination for Classical Composition of the Year. In 2022, the company premiered R.U.R.A Torrent of Light by Nicole Lizee and Nicolas Billon, a new opera about artificial intelligence featuring "new technology built by professors and research assistants in the Digital Futures program at OCAD University."

Since 2001, the company has been operating in Toronto's history Distillery District. In December 2021, the company was notified by the building's owner that it had to vacate its space by August 2022. In March 2025 the company moved to a new joint space with Nightwood Theatre in the Nancy and Ed Jackman Performance Centre, 877 Yonge Street. The new 6,500 square foot venue contains a rehearsal studio and a 200 seat performance facility.
