= Prototype Festival =

Annual festival of contemporary opera and musical theater in New York City

- Locations: New York City, NY
- Years active: 2013-present
- Organized by: Beth Morrison

Prototype Festival is an annual, weeklong contemporary opera and musical theater festival held in New York City.

== Program ==
Prototype Festival is an annual, weeklong festival of contemporary opera and musical theater. The festival encourages nontraditional operatic compositions and performance, or "black-box opera", combining classical techniques with experimental theater. Prototype has a reputation for showing "brash, socially engaged, and substantially post-classical" work—shows with highly charged, "dark, edgy" themes.

Its shows are held in venues across New York City, including venues such as the HERE Arts Center, La MaMa Experimental Theatre Club, Joe's Pub, St. Paul's Chapel, the Park Avenue Armory, St. Ann's Warehouse, National Sawdust, and Skirball Center for the Performing Arts.

== Organization ==
The first Prototype Festival was organized by alternative opera producer Beth Morrison and the HERE Arts Center's Kristin Marting and Kim Whitener in 2013. Their intent was to highlight composers whose nontraditional work rarely received commissions.

== Reception ==
The festival has a reputation for producing new operas of high quality. While classical music institutions struggled to sell new work to its core audience, classical music critic Anne Midgette cited Prototype as developing an audience for opera outside of these institutions and evolving the form into less of a "bourgeois art form". Prototype rose to prominence quickly, Midgette wrote, from a confluence of the opera world's "desperation" to find new, good work and the reduced costs of staging an experimental show outside of major mainstages. Without remaking the genre, she wrote that Prototype provides the creativity and energy to attempt new works.

The New Yorker wrote that Prototype's 11-day 2014 lineup produced more substance for the format than a decade of the New York City Opera. The magazine noted the festival's equal time given to female artists as deviant from New York theater norms. In 2024 Blogcritics noted that the festival is "known for adventurous and outstanding programming from around the world" and The New York Times wrote that its offerings "tend to be politically charged, scrappy and stirring."

== World premieres ==
As of 2019, Prototype's headlining shows tended to premiere outside of the festival.

| Year | Opera | Composer | Libretto |
|---|---|---|---|
| 2024 | Malinxe | Laura Ortman | Autumn Chacon |
| 2024 | Adoration | Mary Kouyoumdjian | Royce Vavrek |
| 2024 | Terce: A Practical Breviary | Heather Christian | |
| 2023 | The All Sing: Here Lies Joy | Daniel Bernard Roumain | Marc Bamuthi Joseph |
| 2018 | Acquanetta, chamber version | Michael Gordon | Deborah Artman |
| 2018 | The Echo Drift | Mikael Karlsson | Elle Kunnos de Voss, Kathryn Walat |
| 2017 | Mata Hari | Matt Marks | |
| 2016 | Angel's Bone | Du Yun | Royce Vavrek |
| 2014 | The Scarlet Ibis | Stefan Weisman | David Cote |
| 2014 | Sunken Cathedral | Bora Yoon | Bora Yoon |
