= Ellen Reed =

Ellen Reed may refer to:

- Ellen Elizabeth Reed, code-breaker at Bletchley Park
- Ellen Reed, a character on the TV series Family Ties
- Ellen Reid, Canadian musician
- Ellen Reid (composer), American composer
- Ellen Read, New Hampshire politician
