= Amir Shpilman =

Israeli composer (born 1980)

Amir Shpilman אמיר שפילמן
- Born: December 4, 1980 (age 45); Tel Aviv, Israel
- Origin: Israel
- Genres: Contemporary music Experimental music
- Occupation: Composer
- Website: amirshpilman.com

Amir Shpilman (Hebrew: אמיר שפילמן; born December 4, 1980) is an Israeli composer.

== Education and career ==
Shpilman was born in Tel Aviv where he started his composition studies at the age of 17. After three years in Paris where he studied solfege, harmony piano and composition, he moved to the United States, in 2006, to study at the City University of New York where he obtained a bachelor's degree in music composition under the tutelage of Tania León, Jason Eckardt and with close mentorship of pianist Ursula Oppens.

He received his master's degree in composition with a focus on conducting from the Hochschule für Musik Carl Maria von Weber in Dresden under the tutelage of Mark Andre, Manos Tsangaris, and Franz Martin Olbrisch. In 2011, He founded the Ensemble Moto Perpetuo, a New York-based chamber orchestra specializing in contemporary music and collaborative creations, and served as its artistic director until 2015.

During his career, Shpilman has worked with a variety of performers, orchestras, and ensembles including the Ensemble Intercontemporain (Paris), International Contemporary Ensemble (New York), Mivos Quartet, Ensembles Meitar and Nikel (Tel Aviv), Interface (Frankfurt), AuditivVokal Dresden, El Perro Andaluz (Dresden), Johann Rosenmüller Ensemble (Leipzig), LUX:NM and Ensemble Mosaik (Berlin); Ensembles Reconsil and Platypus (Vienna) and more.

Among his collaborators are laureate of the Sapir Prize for literature author Reuven Namdar, sound sculptor Hans van Koolwijk, visual artist and designer Ghiora Aharoni, poet Nadja Küchenmeister and more.

In April 2013, Hedef, a piece for large ensemble, won the Jury Prize at the Heidelberger Frühling festival conducted by Matthias Pintscher. In October 2014, Ensemble Intercontemporain premiered his large work Iridescent Stasis at the Venice Biennial and in 2016, Shpilman was selected to represent Germany at the European Capital of Culture, in Wrocław, premiering his piece Destruction for choir and large orchestra. The open-air concert took place on the banks of the Oder river, with a crowd of 140,000 spectators.

His music is published by Edition Gravis.

== Compositions ==
=== Stage works ===
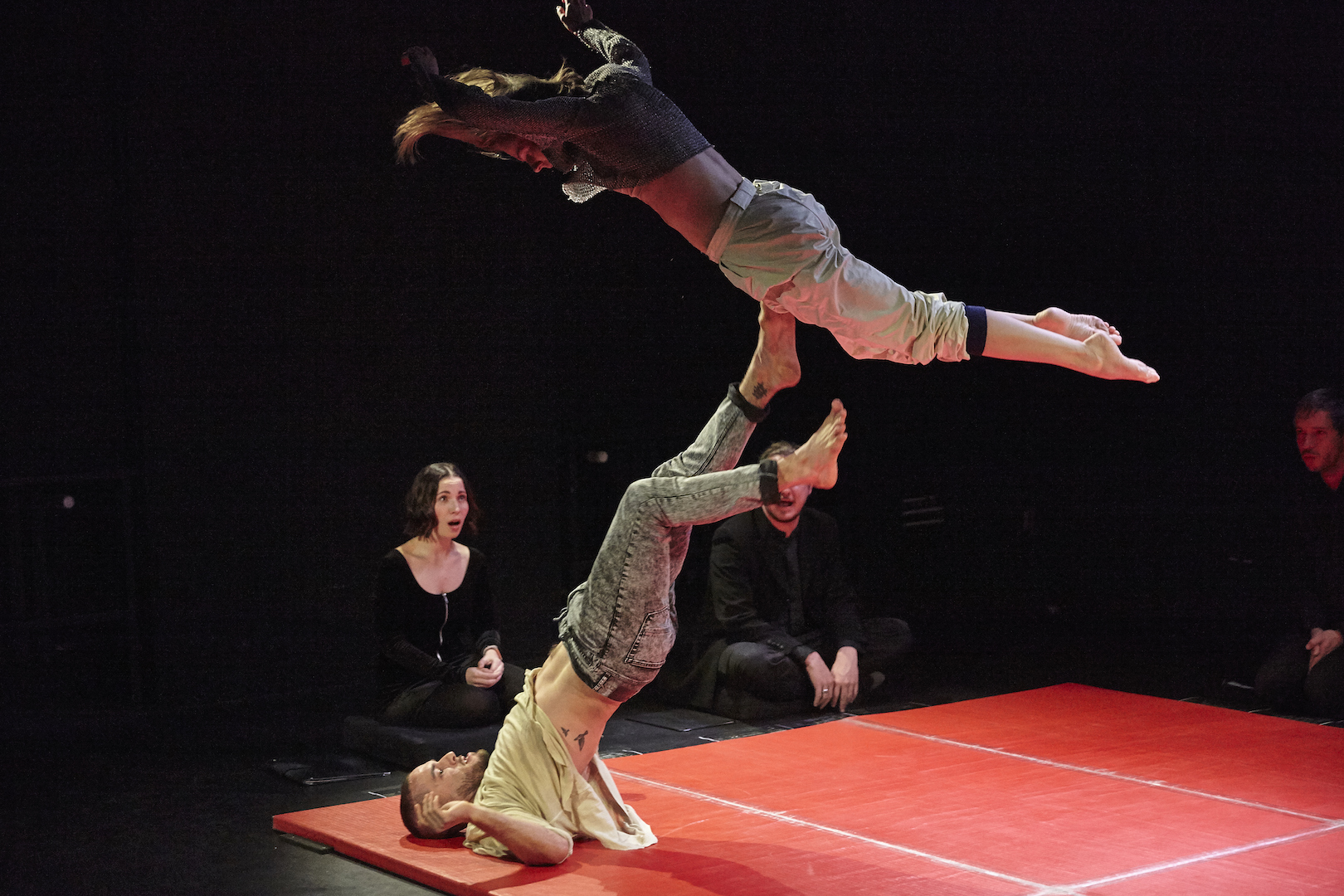
Tiferet, music theater performance

- TIFERET (2017) new music theater; for 2-4 dancers, 5-7 vocal soloists, 30 voice choir, Dynamic Speakers and electronics; Commission of the Maxim Gorki Theater, Premiered in the Maxim Gorki Theater, Studio Я in Berlin by dancers Elena Kilchitskaya, Yotam Peled, vocal soloists AuditivVokal Dresden conducted by Olaf Katzer, and the Carl-von-Ossietzky choir conducted by Berit Kramer
- Images (2017) for accordion, saxophone and soprano; Commission of FrauVonDa as part of the Musiktheater project TaxiMusic; Premiered at Acker Stadt Palast by LUX:NM and Mezzo-Soprano Claudia Van Hasselt
- Situation Object 2 (2017) for 2 dancers and ensemble of vocal soloists; Commission of the Maxim Gorki Theater, Premiered in Studio Я, Berlin by Dancers Elena Kilchitskaya, Yotam Peled, and AuditivVokal Dresden
- Here I am, Send me! (2013) A cappella for 20 vocal soloists; Commission of LABA, 14th St Y Theater NYC, fully staged theatrical performance in 2014 at the 250th anniversary celebrations of Dresden Academy of Fine Arts, Conducted by Amir Shpilman

=== Orchestral works ===
- Inmitten des Lebens (2017) for baroque orchestra (period instruments), mixed choir and six vocal soloists; Original Text by Nadja Küchenmeister; Commission of Freiberger Dom, Premiered in the Freiberg Cathedral, Germany by Freiberger DomChor, Ensemble Freiberger Dom-Music and the Johann Rosenmüller Ensemble
- Destruction (2015/16) for symphony orchestra and large choir; Commission of the European Capital of Culture, Wrocław 2016; Premiered in an open air concert on the banks of the Oder river in Wrocław, Poland
- Sh’ma (2010) for orchestra; Premiered at the Brooklyn Center for the Performing Arts by the Brooklyn College Orchestra, Conducted by Mark Rothman
- Nir’s Theme (2005) for Orchestra

=== Ensemble works ===
- Indestruction (2019) composition for ensemble and Dynamic Speakers; Commission of Ensemble Mosaik and the Adele and John Gray Endowment Fund; Premiered at Kesselhaus Kulturbrauerei in Berlin by Ensemble Mosaik and conducted by Enno Poppe
- Iridescent Stasis (2014) for large ensemble; Commission of Ensemble Intercontemporain and La Biennale di Venezia; Premiered by Ensemble Intercontemporain, conducted by Jean-Michaël Lavoie
- Hedef (2013) for large ensemble; Commission of the Heidelberger Frühling (Heidelberg Spring Festival); Premiered by Ensemble of the young composers academy conducted by Matthias Pintscher
- Collective Improvisation 1 (2011) for large ensemble and four laptops; Premiered by Ensemble Moto Perpetuo at the DiMenna Center for Classical Music in New York

=== Chamber music ===
- Die Weiße Stadt (2019) woodwind quartet; Commission of Ensemble diX in celebration of 100 years of the Bauhaus movement; Premiered at the Lindenau-Museum Altenburg by Ensemble Dix
- Spins 2 (2019) for solo flute and electronics; Commission of Kulturkontakt Austria (OeAD) and Platypus Ensemble; World premiere at Wien Modern Festival
- Entangled (2019) for trio of open instrumentation and electronics; Commission of Ensemble Mosaik; Premiered at Acker Stadt Palast in Berlin
- Spins (2016) for saxophone and percussion (open instrumentation); Commission of Ensemble Nikel and the Tzlil Meudcan Festival; Premiered at the Teiva Theater in Jaffa, Israel by Patrick Stadler and Brian Archinal
- Resisim (2015) for baritone and ensemble; Commission of the DeutschlandFunk – Forum Neuer Musik for the project Mekomot; Premiered at the Ehemalige Synagoge Stavenhagen in Germany
- Echad (2014) for flute, clarinet, piano, violin and cello; Commission of Heidelberger Frühling (Heidelberg Spring Festival); Premiered by Meitar Ensemble, conducted by Matthias Pintscher
- Sheketak (2011) for flute, clarinet, piano, violin and cello; Premiered in New York by International Contemporary Ensemble
- Kol Nidrei (2011) for clarinet and two pianos; Premiered at the Brooklyn College, mentored by pianist Ursula Oppens
- As if These Clouds (2010) for 6 percussionists; Premiered at Baruch Performing Arts Center in New York and at the Donaueschinger Musiktage in 2014
- Abashment (2009) for solo trombone, violin, viola, cello, contrabass; Premiered at Brooklyn Center for the Performing Arts by trombonist David Whitwell and Mivos String Quartet
- Asymptote 2 (2009) for flute/pic, clarinet, b. trombone, percussion, piano, violin, viola, cello, contra-Bass; Premiered at Brooklyn Center for the Performing Arts

=== Vocal music ===
- Situation Object 3 "Delivery" (2020) for solo soprano; Commission of Concepts of Doing/Berlin Edition - Festival Zeitgenössische Musik; World premiere at Studioboerne45, Berlin, by Soprano Sirje Aleksandra Viise
- Esh (2019) for chamber choir SATB a cappella; Commission of Junges Ensemble Dresden; World premiere at Weinbergskirsche, Dresden/Trachenberg, Germany
- Malleable Images (2017) for ensemble of vocal soloists; Commission of AuditivVokal Dresden; Premiered at the Albertinum Museum, Lichthof, Dresden, conducted by Olaf Katzer
- Malleable Cycle (2017) for large choir; Commission of AuditivVokal Dresden; Premiered in Chorfestival Meißen klingt; World premiere by 200 voice choir at the Meißen Domplatz, Germany
- Situation Object (2014) for solo soprano; Commission of Town Hall Seattle; Premiered at Town Hall Seattle by Mary Mackenzie (mezzo-soprano);
- Here I am, Send me! (2013) A cappella for 20 vocal soloists; Commission of LABA, 14th St Y Theater NYC
- Darkness (2012) for piano and baritone; Commission of the Frankfurt Alte Oper; Premiered by baritone Leigh Melrose and pianist Anna Tillbrook
- All is one (2010) for large symphonic choir; Premiered at the Brooklyn Center for the Performing Arts, conducted by Vince Peterson
- Kiri / White Mist (2008) for mezzo-soprano and piano; Poem by Midori Higashijo; Premiered at Brooklyn Performing Arts Center by Mezzo Soprano Fabienne Seveillac and pianist Masako Yokouchi
- In Their Memory (2007) for chamber choir, premiered at the Brooklyn Center for the Performing Arts, conducted by Jonathan Babcock

=== Other works ===
- Open Closed Open (2018/19) a multimedia installation with Dynamic Speakers; Commission of the Jewish Museum Berlin,
- Touch Space (2018) an immersive music installation in a 72 hours party in About Blank nightclub
- Canto (2018) sound installation with Dynamic Speakers as part of CANTO XVIII, an immersive multidisciplinary salon & gala at the American Irish Historical Society, New York
- Klangmøbil(2015) a collaborative artistic research about the relationship between sound production, movement, and matter resulted in a set of mobile sound sculptures, designed uniquely for performances and sound installations

== Awards ==
Shpilman has received several awards, including:

- The Dagesh KunstLab Prize for the work Open, Closed, Open, at the Jewish Museum Berlin, in 2018
- First Place (Jury prize, Young Composers Academy) for his piece Hedef at the Heidelberg Spring Festival, in 2013
