= Luke Mombrea =

American musical artist

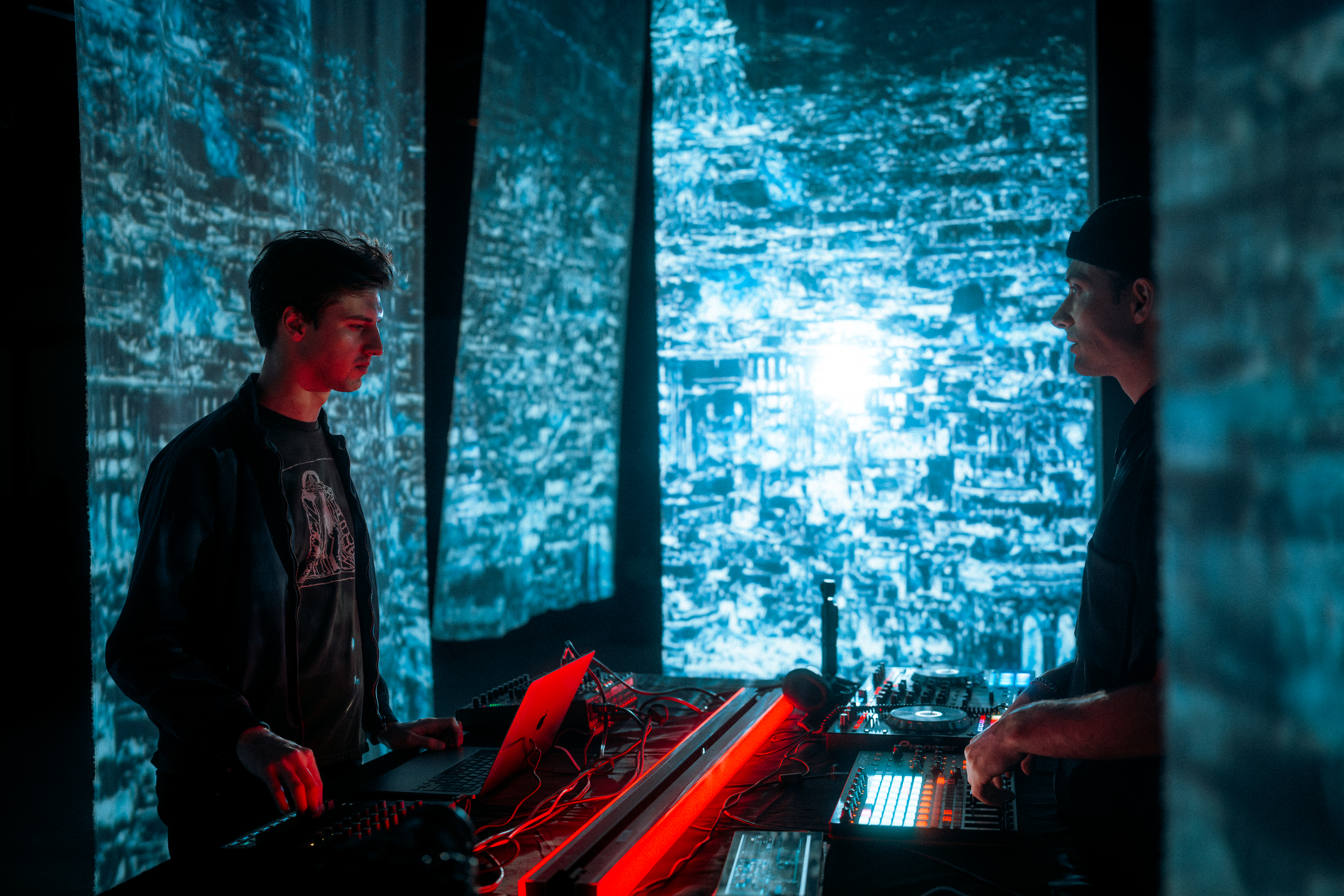
- Mombrea performing with Nate Mohler in 2025

Background information
- Born: Oakland, California
- Origin: Los Angeles, California
- Genres: Experimental; classical; electronic; ambient
- Occupation: Composer
- Instruments: Piano; cello; guitar; electronics
- Years active: 2019–present
- Label: Mesh
- Website: www.lukemombrea.com

Luke Mombrea is an American composer of modern classical and electroacoustic music. He is best known for works utilizing live electronic elements, microtonality, folk music and field recordings.

== Education ==
Mombrea studied cognitive neuroscience and music composition at the University of California, Davis and University of California, Los Angeles, before receiving a Master's of Music in composition at the Royal College of Music, London.

== Career ==
His string quartet Lowlands was premiered by the Carducci Quartet in 2023 and features archival folk music transformed into looping minimalist structures.

In December 2023 Mombrea's piece Aurora for magnetic resonator piano was commissioned by The Night With... and performed by Xenia Pestova Bennett as part of the University of Leeds International Concert Series.

His piece Black Gold was commissioned by the London Symphony Orchestra in 2023 and received its premiere at LSO St. Luke's in May 2024. Performances of his concert music have been featured on both BBC 3 Radio and NTS Radio.

Mombrea has had audiovisual works featured at venues including Art Basel, the Wallace Collection, Olbrich Botanical Gardens, Culver City Hall and the Barbican Centre.

He has worked in film and television, scoring the upcoming HBO pilot Point Unknown, which stars the musical artist Corbin. Mombrea has also worked in the music department on films and television shows including Silo, Loki, Black Panther: Wakanda Forever, The Wild Robot, Emancipation, and Endeavour.

In June 2025, Mombrea's piece Redwood Hymn was premiered by the London Symphony Orchestra at the Barbican Centre. In November 2025 he won an Ivor Novello Award for his work with the London Symphony Orchestra on Black Gold.

On May 14, 2026, experimental chamber music ensemble Manchester Collective announced that his piece Black Gold will be performed on its eponymously named tour alongside works by Hildur Guðnadóttir, James Tenney, J.S. Bach and Sasha Scott.
