= Isomonstrosity =

2022 studio album by isomonstrosity

isomonstrosity

Studio album by isomonstrosity (Ellen Reid, Johan Lenox, and Yuga Cohler)
- Released: November 18, 2022
- Recorded: Composed, recorded and produced during quarantine, summer 2020. Completed in 2021-2022.
- Studio: Recorded separately in pieces, with every musician working in isolation (during the 2020-2021 quarantine due to the COVID-19 pandemic)
- Genre: Classical; synthesizer music; vocal chamber; electronic; avant-pop; hip hop
- Length: 27:07
- Label: Brassland
- Producer: isomonstrosity

isomonstrosity is the sole album released by the joint venture of Ellen Reid, Johan Lenox, and Yuga Cohler. The album artist is officially listed as "isomonstrosity", which is composed of the three of them. The collaborative, avant-pop album was released on November 18, 2022, via Brassland Records on cassette tape and in digital format. The album features collaborative guest appearances from Zacari, Danny L Harle, Empress Of, 645AR, Danny Brown, Vic Mensa, and Kacy Hill.

Bringing both Reid's classical and synth-based compositions to the project, the critically acclaimed vocal chamber music album employs the modern production techniques and aesthetics of hip-hop, assembling contributions from a wide array of artists into a satisfying and varied final work.

== Inspiration, background and approach ==
isomonstrosity was inspired in part by the mood and the constraints of the COVID-19 quarantines of 2020-21, recorded separately in pieces, with every musician working in isolation. The goal was to make a vocal chamber music album using the same process as a contemporary rap album, assembling contributions from a wide array of artists then reorganizing them endlessly into a final work. They first commissioned excerpts from established new music composers—Bryce Dessner, Marcos Balter, Nina C Young, Wang Lu, Carlos Simon, and themselves [isomonstrosity, the group/trio]—which were then recorded one track at a time by International Contemporary Ensemble. Next, the featured vocalists recorded parts inspired by those excerpts. Finally all of the music was chopped up and restructured, layered and collaged into a final album.

— Artist profile (Brassland Records)

== Reception ==
Hannah Jocelyn on Pitchfork described the album as "both tasteful and weirdly frustrating", giving it a rating of 6.0/10. Dominic Haley on Loud and Quiet rated it 8.0/10 and wrote that the authors "chart a trek across cinematic-sounding classical landscapes and fractured pop", resulting in "a record that simultaneously collapses genre lines and builds up whole new ones".

== Track listing ==
All track listing information is sourced from the album's liner notes/credits. (Also see Isomonstrosity at Discogs.)

isomonstrosity track listing
No.	Title	Music	Length
1.	"Shining"	isomonstrosity	2:27
2.	"Cascades"	isomonstrosity	0:58
3.	"Too Quiet"	isomonstrosity	1:15
4.	"Watch It Burn"	isomonstrosity; Zacari	3:44
5.	"I Hope She Is Sleeping Well"	isomonstrosity; Danny L Harle	1:46
6.	"Take Me Back"	isomonstrosity; Empress Of	2:45
7.	"Break Glass"	isomonstrosity	1:33
8.	"Careful What You Wish For"	isomonstrosity; Danny Brown; 645AR; Johan Lenox	2:57
9.	"Wake Up"	isomonstrosity; Vic Mensa	2:41
10.	"I Used To"	isomonstrosity; Kacy Hill	3:08
11.	"Losing My Mind"	isomonstrosity	3:35
12.	"Take Me Back - Edit"	isomonstrosity; Empress Of	1:57
Total length:			27:07

Note: Digital download version has different tracklist: there is not "Intro" as track #1, and "Take Me Back - Edit" is track #12.

In addition to the above credits and the trio known as "isomonstrosity" (Ellen Reid, Johan Lenox, and Yuga Cohler), the album also adds the following general (i.e., non-track-specific) credits via its liner notes:

Composed, recorded and produced during quarantine, summer 2020. Completed in 2021-2022.

Album produced by isomonstrosity.
Mixed and mastered by Madeline Leavitt.

Featuring instrumental music composed by Marcos Balter, Bryce Dessner, Johan Lenox, Wang Lu, Ellen Reid, Carlos Simon, Nina C. Young and performed by International Contemporary Ensemble.

Instrument credits for International Contemporary Ensemble members:

- Isabel Gleicher, flute and piccolo
- Josh Modney, violin
- Joshua Rubin, clarinet, electronics and keyboard
- Katinka Kleijn, cello
- Levy Lorenzo, percussion
- Nathan Davis, electronics
- Phyllis Chen, piano
- Rebekah Heller, bassoon

Additional instrumental performances by composers:

- Bryce Dessner, electronics
- Johan Lenox: Bassoon chorale

Artwork by Allison Tanenhaus

Packaging design by Rob Carmichael | Seen Studio
