= Evan LeRoy Johnson =

American operatic tenor (1943–2023)

- Education: Royal Manchester College of Music
- Occupations: Operatic tenor; Academic teacher
- Organizations: Royal Northern College of Music; Royal College of Music; Royal Academy of Music
- Awards: m

Evan LeRoy Johnson is an American operatic tenor who has appeared internationally at leading opera houses and festivals, based at the Bavarian State Opera since 2021. His leading roles include Bizet's Don José and Puccini's Rodolfo and Pinkerton. His performance as the Prince in Dvořák's Rusalka at the Glyndebourne was recorded on video.

== Life and career ==
Evan LeRoy Johnson was born in United States. He studied voice at the University of Kentucky and at the Curtis Institute of Music.

LeRoy Johnson made his European debut at the Norwegian Opera in 2016 in a staged version of Britten's War Requiem by Calixto Bieito conducted by Lothar Koenigs. He first appeared in Germany as Don José in Bizet's Carmen at the Oldenburgisches Staatstheater. He first appeared at the Bavarian State Opera in 2018 as Cassio in Verdi's Otello and joined the ensemble in 2021, performing as Rodolfo in Puccini's La bohème, Count Albert in Korngold's Die tote Stadt, Chevalier de la Force in Poulenc's Dialogues des Carmélites, and Brighella in Ariadne auf Naxos by Richard Strauss, among others.

In 2019, he appeared at the Glyndebourne Festival for the first time, as the Prince in Dvořák's Rusalka, conducted by Robin Ticciati. A reviewer noted the pure vocal lyricism of his voice paired with stage presence. He performed as Pinkerton in Puccini's Madama Butterfly at the Dallas Opera and in a new production staged by R. B. Schlather at the Oper Frankfurt, with Heather Engebretson in the title role. He performed as Edgardo in Donizetti's Lucia di Lammermoor at the Lyric Opera of Kansas City, and as the tenor soloist in Verdi's Requiem at the Opera Philadelphia. He appeared as Lensky in Tchaikovsky's Eugene Onegin at the San Francisco Opera. He performed at the Salzburg Festival as Malcolm in Verdi's Macbeth. He first appeared at the National Theatre in Prague as the Prince in Rusalka in 2023.
