= Prism (opera) =

2018 opera by Ellen Reid

- Opera by Ellen Reid
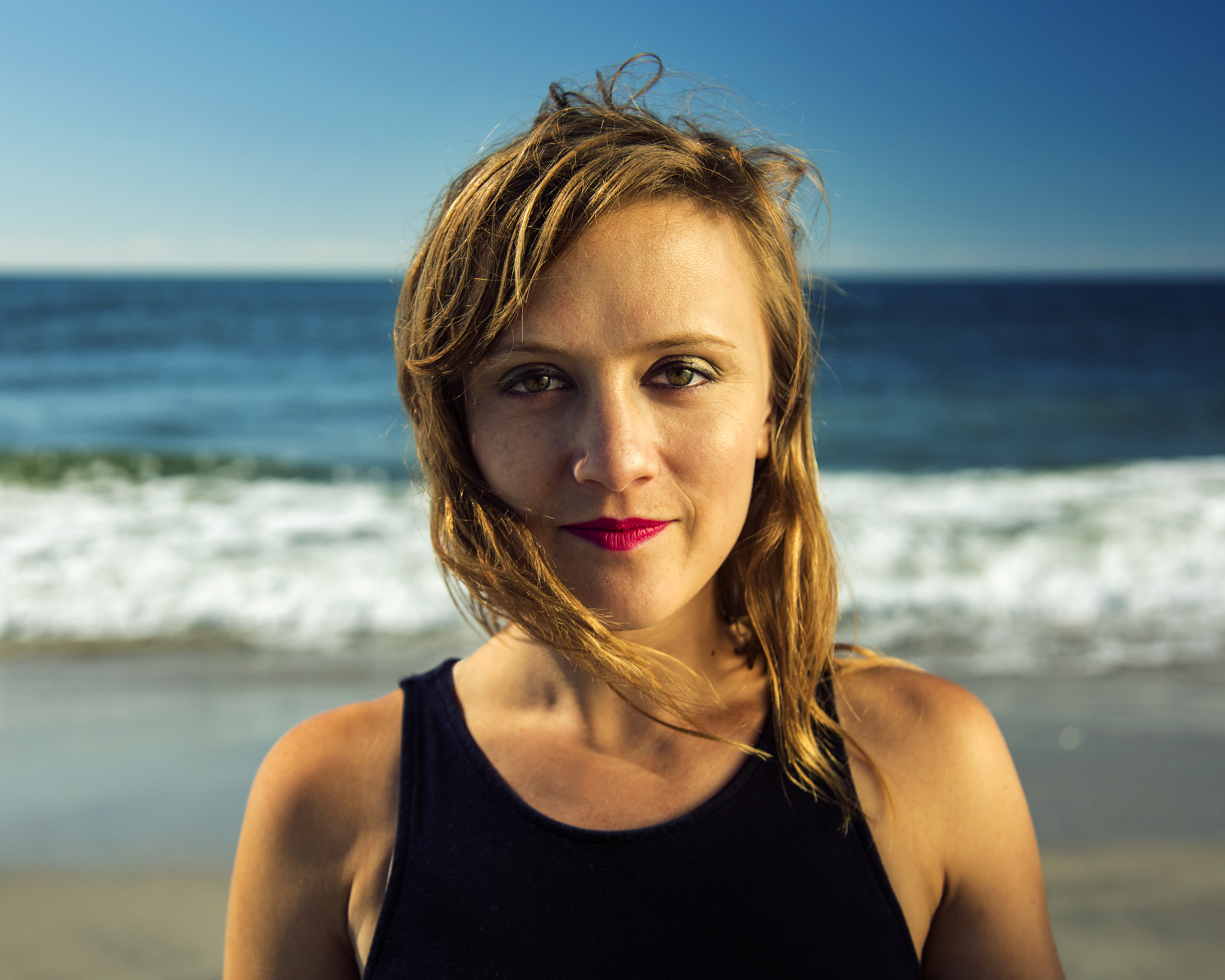
- Ellen Reid in 2016
- Librettist: Roxie Perkins
- Language: English
- Premiere: 29 November 2018; Los Angeles Opera

Prism (styled as p r i s m) is a 2018 opera by Ellen Reid that explores the post-traumatic stress experience after sexual assault. Reid received the 2019 Pulitzer Prize for Music for her work on the opera.

== Composition history ==
Ellen Reid began composing Prism in 2015 along with librettist Roxie Perkins. Reid and Perkins, both survivors of sexual assault themselves, began working on the opera as a way to help overcome their own trauma. "We started working on the piece about five years ago, before the #MeToo movement, before there was a kind of shift in thinking about what it meant to be a survivor. And it felt really important." Reid said in an interview with NPR on April 15, 2019. The opera took a total of 4 years of grueling self-reflection to accurately depict the emotional impact of sexual and emotional abuse.

Despite being written before the #MeToo movement took the internet by storm, this kaleidoscopic opera took on greater significance as a result of the movement, which sought to raise awareness of how prevalent sexual harassment and sexual assault is in society and to help survivors reach out to each other in mutual understanding of their experiences. As more and more survivors came forward about their experiences, the more important the opera became to Reid. When asked about the piece's connection to the movement in an interview with the San Francisco Classical Voice on November 17, 2018, she said "We would be writing and come up with ideas we thought would make the story more exciting. Then we would decide to cut them because they were too intense. Then almost exactly the same thing we'd written would show up on the news! The idea of life mirroring art really happened with this piece." Despite the real life parallels, these graphic depictions were never actually added to the performance, as Reid sought to depict the more subtle, unseen ways in which survivors are impacted by the event. By delving into the more subtle effects of sexual trauma on the human psyche, the work gives audiences the chance to intimately experience what is like to experience and confront the aftermath of sexual violence in ways that could only be articulated through the richly intense soundscapes and striking choreography.

Prism was presented in a rolling premiere by the LA Opera's Off Grand initiative in November 2018 and at the Prototype Festival in January 2019. The opera was immediately greeted with praise. Simon Williams, one of the critics who attended the premiere, described the piece as a "heady theatrical concoction that left the audience both exhilarated and confused". Mark Swed wrote about it in the LA Times "It also takes a certain gumption to ask a composer to make a big deal of setting the word “slurp.” Yet Reid makes a big deal of it and everything else. Her fabulous slurping is like nothing you have ever heard before. Her vocal lines have inherent lyrical quality that transcends even the most horrendous emotional outbursts or the disco beat of the club. Musical styles are myriad, yet this is the work of one recognizable voice." Catherine Womack wrote in I Care if You Listen "Above all, Prism is about the power that comes from choosing to survive. Through endlessly creative, eclectic music, Reid takes us into a fuzzy place where repressed memories and reality blur. It is not always an easy space in which to sit, but it is one that sticks, lingering in ears and minds for days like mist. It serves as a reminder that when women tell their own stories, when the complexity of a victim's internal experience is fully fleshed out, the result can be powerful." In addition to high praise from critics, Prism was awarded the Pulitzer Prize for Music in 2019.

== Performance history ==
The world premiere of Prism took place at REDCAT, Los Angeles, California, on 29 November 2018, commissioned by Beth Morrison Projects. It then went on to premiere in New York at the Prototype Festival. "Prism" made its international debut in São Paulo, Brazil in August/September 2019.

== Roles ==
Roles, voice types, premiere cast
Role	Voice type	Premiere cast, 29 November 2018 Conductor: Julian Wachner
Bibi, a daughter	soprano	Anna Schubert
Lumee, a mother	mezzo-soprano	Rebecca Jo Loeb
Chroma	mixed chorus	12 members of the Choirs of Trinity Wall Street

== Synopsis ==
Locked away in a sterile room, a sickly child Bibi and her doting mother Lumee are each other's sole protectors from the unknown. When a mysterious illness lurking outside their door leaves Bibi unable to walk, her youthful curiosity begins to simmer and a seductive external existence can no longer be ignored. Prism, by Ellen Reid and Roxie Perkins, is a haunting, kaleidoscopic new work of opera-theatre that traverses the elasticity of memory after trauma. Composer Ellen Reid's music erupts with color, using choral and orchestral manipulation to deliver an eerily distinct sonic world.

=== Act 1 ===
The first act, titled "sanctuary as it should be", utilizes a dreamlike soundscape. Bibi is locked away in a room with her overly concerned mother, Lumee, who serves as her caretaker. The staging for this scene relies on having a boxed room on-stage, representing the tight, closed-off space where Bibi is kept. Inside the box is soft, yellow light, which represents the "safety" of the sanctuary. This soundscape, which Reid describes as “dreamy and impressionistic”, features lyrical duets between Bibi and Lumee, and the costumes (flowing white gowns), leave a haunting impression that things are too good to be true. Bibi is unable (or refuses) to walk, as her legs are bruised to the point that she cannot stand on them. She seems timid, fragile, helpless and overly reliant on her mother's care. Lumee obsesses over Bibi, playing with her, giving her medicine, doing all in her power to ensure her daughter is well. Though the music is beautiful, the chorus, in part represented by blue light, lends to a somewhat ominous tone, the most subtle hint that something is not right. It calls to Bibi, enticing her to leave the sanctuary. It lends itself to questions: is Bibi actually sick? Is Lumee actually a caretaker, or is she desperately pretending that all is well? The audience is left to consider these during the intermission.

=== Act 2 ===
The second act, titled "sanctuary as it was", takes place outside of the cube, in a club type setting with extremely aggressive club music, instruments pushed to the extremes of their range to extenuate the harshness of their sound. We are suddenly transported back in time to fragmented memories of Bibi's and Lumee's past. The soundscape becomes more modern and techno, a drastic contrast from the impressionistic music from the first act. Strobe lighting is used to create a suddenly disorienting environment, leaving the audience to piece together through the harsh lighting what is unfolding in front of them. In this scene, Bibi stands alone, fascinated by the sensory-filled environment. The audience gets a new perspective on Lumee: a crude, selfish woman. Blue light is cast on Bibi as she is lifted by dancers and carried away. Abstractly, through harsh music and choreography, the audience figures out that Lumee abandoned Bibi in the club, and Bibi was raped. Though no violence is depicted on stage, it is clear that a tragedy is being depicted. To depict the disjointed, pieced-together memories that survivors often have of their assaults, the libretto focuses vividly on minor details, such as the scrunchie that Bibi lost in the midst of the assault.

=== Act 3 ===
The third act, titles "sanctuary as it is", returns to the cube, but it depicts a significantly different reality than what was initially presented in the first act. Instead of a pristine room filled with white cloth, the audience is met with a room cluttered with trash and rags. The audience learns definitively that the reality in the first act is merely a fabrication, and the reality is that both women are traumatized, left behind with a tragic existence. Lumee is desperate to forget, to make her daughter forget, to make amends by throwing reality under the rug. The chorus begins to take a greater meaning for Bibi; we learn that the chorus represents the need to face the reality of what happened head on. We learn that all along Bibi wants to remember the events, to truly embrace and heal from it. To escape, she must run from the sanctuary and go out into the world. Despite sending the audience on a harrowing emotional journey, Prism ends with the most poignant and empowering message: that in embracing the truth, by coming forward about your experiences, that it is possible to heal from sexual and emotional abuse.

== Instrumentation ==
The opera is scored for a 14-piece chamber orchestra, consisting of strings, harp, piano, flute, bass clarinet, horn, percussion (including vibraphone, flexatone and a SPD-SX Sampling Pad), and a chorus of 12.

== Reviews ==
Mark Swed of the Los Angeles Times praised Reid, saying "she evokes a world of its own through a chamber orchestra of strings, shimmering percussion, harp, piano, flute, bass clarinet and horn that becomes a maker of wonder, mystery, suspense, fear and glory ... melodies are endless and inventively transformed, the atmospheric pressure ever changing." Swed also lauded singers Anna Schubert (Bibi) and Rebecca Jo Loeb (Lumee) stating both are "strong singers and theatrically forces with which to be contended".

Jim Farber in his review for San Francisco Classical Voice said "the opera treads a fine line between poetic abstraction and gut-wrenching reality ... it is Reid's exceptional score with its wide-range of musical vocabularies, and the dramatic power of Loeb and Schubert's performances that give prism its overwhelming power." Farber also commended Reid for freely moving from "soaring melodies and rich choral harmonies to abrasive dissonance accentuated by the twittering of col legno strings and pre-recorded electronic effects". He was also impressed with the direction of James Darrah, stating he "combined confrontation and painful realism with poetic abstraction".

== Awards and nominations ==
Year	Award	Category	Nominee(s)	Result	Citation
2019	Pulitzer Prize	Music	Ellen Reid	Won	
2019	Music Critics Association of North America	Best New Opera	Ellen Reid (composer); Roxie Perkins (librettist)	Won	
2020	International Opera Awards	World Premiere	Ellen Reid	Nominated	

== Recording ==
Year	Cast (Bibi, Lumee, Chroma)	Conductor	Label
2019	Anna Schubert, Rebecca Jo Loeb, Novus NY	Julian Wachner	UMC – Decca Gold
