= Signal Festival =

Annual festival of light art and digital culture in Prague

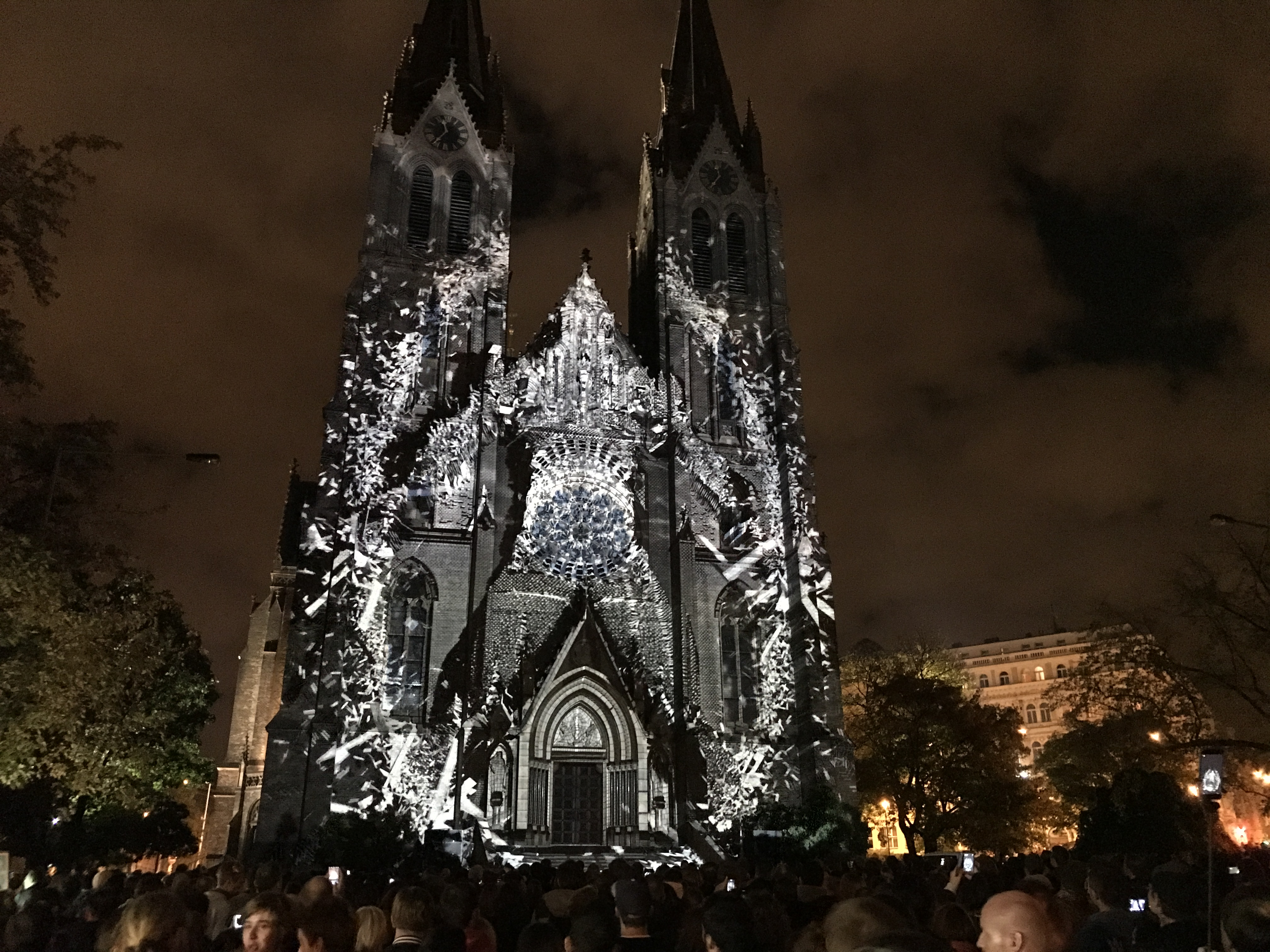
- Videomapping on the façade of the Church of St. Ludmila, Náměstí Míru, during the 2017 edition.
- Status: Active
- Genre: Light art, digital art, interactive installation
- Frequency: Annual
- Locations: Prague, Czech Republic
- Country: Czech Republic
- Inaugurated: 2013
- Most recent: 2025
- Website: www.signalfestival.com

Signal Festival is a Prague-based festival of digital and creative culture, held annually since 2013. The festival transforms the city into an open-air gallery of contemporary art, with installations by leading Czech and international artists working across light design, visual and digital art, artificial intelligence, and conceptual practice. Signal Festival is noted for combining Prague's historic architecture with emerging technologies and current social themes, while placing emphasis on both public experience and education.

The festival is among the most significant producers of contemporary art in the Czech Republic. It has supported emerging generations of artists, commissioned over seventy original site-specific works, and runs accompanying programmes for children, students, and creative professionals. Signal Festival maintains partnerships with a number of international festivals and cultural institutions, and has played a central role in developing the Czech digital art scene.

In recent years the festival has received international recognition. The exhibition Strange Attractions, created in collaboration with British studio United Visual Artists (UVA) and the Kunsthalle Praha team, received the PRIX NUMIX 2025 award in the International Digital Art category. The installation Audire Fluctus by Kryštof Brůha, realised through the open call Signal Calling in partnership with PrusaLab, won a LIT Lighting Design Award.

In October 2025, the organisers opened Signal Space, a permanent gallery for digital and immersive art housed in the former Old Town Market Hall in central Prague. The Signal brand now encompasses the festival itself, the Signal Space gallery, the Signal Forum educational platform with regular conferences, and the creative agency Signal Creative, through which a number of festival works have been presented internationally.

== History ==
=== Origins ===
The concept for Signal Festival arose from a large-scale video mapping project created in 2010 by the Czech art group The Macula and producer Martin Pošta, presented on the façade of the Prague astronomical clock to mark its 600th anniversary. The success of the projection prompted Pošta, together with curator Jan Rolník and Macula artist Amar Mulabegović, to develop the idea of a dedicated festival of light art for Prague. Preparation for the inaugural edition took approximately three years.

The festival receives funding from the Capital City of Prague, the Czech Ministry of Culture, the Ministry of Regional Development, involved municipal districts, and commercial sponsorship partnerships.

=== Growth and recognition ===
From an attendance of approximately 250,000 in its first year, Signal Festival grew rapidly. By its fourth edition in 2016, attendance had reached 578,137 according to data collected by festival partner Cisco Systems. That same year, the festival was designated a top-priority cultural event of Prague and the Czech Republic by the city authorities and the Czech Ministry of Culture.

In 2014, The Guardian named Signal among Europe's top ten light art festivals. The Singapore daily The Straits Times listed it among the eight most interesting light festivals in the world in 2017.

In thirteen years, the festival has drawn more than five million visitors to Prague, making it the largest showcase of digital and creative culture in the Czech Republic.

== Concept and format ==
Signal Festival takes place over four nights each October, typically from a Thursday to a Sunday. Installations are distributed across designated walking routes through Prague's city centre and, from 2017 onwards, outer districts including Vinohrady, Holešovice, and Karlín. Routes are designed so that visitors can explore on foot, with the majority of works accessible free of charge.

The programme combines video mapping on historical façades, large-scale outdoor light installations, interactive works, and immersive indoor environments. Each edition includes new commissions and world or European premieres; at the 2016 festival, two thirds of the 23 installations were world or European premieres.

From 2015, the festival introduced a paid spherical-dome installation (the Signal Dome) for more intimate, immersive experiences. From 2017, a ticketed Signal Gallery Zone provided indoor access to select works. By 2024, this concept had evolved into a Signal INSIDE paid zone, and a Prague Castle circuit was opened for the first time.

Signal Festival also supports emerging Czech artists through the Signal Calling programme, an open-call initiative introduced in 2017 for Czech artists not yet established internationally.

== Annual editions ==
=== 2013 ===
The inaugural festival was held from 17–20 October 2013 and attracted approximately 250,000 visitors. The BBC covered the launch, noting that lighting designers from across Europe had been commissioned to illuminate the city's landmarks. Projection sites included Charles Bridge, the Church of St. Ludmila at Náměstí Míru, and the Petřín Lookout Tower. Entry was free; visitors could purchase special viewing glasses for certain exhibits for 30 CZK.

=== 2014 ===
The 2014 edition (17–20 October) attracted around 460,000 visitors, nearly double the inaugural year's attendance. The Guardian listed Signal Festival among Europe's top ten light art festivals in September of that year, significantly raising the festival's international profile.

=== 2015 ===
The 2015 edition, opening on 15 October, introduced two new features. The Transmit platform — an educational and professional forum for light design specialists, artists, and practitioners — was launched alongside the festival programme. The Signal Dome, a 360° spherical projection structure located on Klárov, was the festival's first paid-entry installation. It presented Nimbes, a fifteen-minute dome projection by French artist Joanie Lemercier.

=== 2016 ===
The 2016 festival (13–16 October) set an attendance record of 578,137, measured by Cisco Systems, the festival's technology partner. The programme comprised 23 installations — 15 light installations, four video mappings or spherical projections, and four interactive works — by artists from eleven countries. A daytime programme was introduced for the first time, primarily targeting families and children, with the Signal Dome screening a spherical projection, Charles IV, by Jan Šíma, from 9:30 a.m. daily. The majority of the programme remained free of charge, with paid entry to the Signal Dome and a video mapping at Tyršův dům.

=== 2017 ===
The fifth-anniversary edition (12–15 October 2017) introduced several lasting structural changes. For the first time, the festival operated two geographic routes: the traditional Downtown route through Old Town and New Town, and a new Vinohrady route through Prague 2 and Prague 3.

A ticketed Signal Gallery Zone (CZK 100) was introduced, housing four indoor installations along the Downtown route in architecturally significant spaces. The Signal Calling open-call programme for emerging Czech artists debuted, with selected works including an installation by students from Milena Dopitová's studio at the Academy of Fine Arts, Prague; works by artist collectives Blok_4 and Heardt; and an installation that had previously premiered at the Burning Man festival in Nevada. As part of its anniversary, the festival repeated all previous video mappings on the façade of the Church of St. Ludmila across the four festival nights.

=== 2018 ===
The 2018 edition continued to expand the festival's international roster and geographic reach within Prague, consolidating the two-route format introduced the previous year.

=== 2019 ===
The 2019 festival (10–13 October) was themed around Revolution, marking the 30th anniversary of the Velvet Revolution. The programme incorporated references to the transformation of Czech society and public space since 1989. Signal Festival also began offering Signal Walks, guided tours of the installations for visitors wishing to contextualise the artworks.

=== 2020 (cancelled) ===
The 2020 edition, scheduled for 15–18 October, was cancelled following restrictions imposed by the Czech health authorities in response to the COVID-19 pandemic. It was the only edition not to take place since the festival's founding in 2013.

=== 2021–2022 ===
The festival resumed in 2021 following the pandemic disruption. In 2022, the programme included a collaboration with the multi-genre theatre Laterna magika, which presented a sound installation by composers Michal Rataj, Jan Trojan, and Dragan Stojčevski, accompanied by a live performance in the Church of St. Salvator.

=== 2023 ===
The 2023 edition (12–15 October) featured Canadian-Mexican artist Rafael Lozano-Hemmer's interactive projection Thermal Drift, which generates a live thermal image of audience members. A video mapping titled Echo, incorporating themes of nature, environment, and human connectivity, was projected on Karlínské náměstí. The festival continued its collaboration with Laterna magika.

=== 2024 ===
The twelfth edition (10–13 October 2024), themed Ecosystems II: Quest, comprised 22 installations including seven in the paid Gallery Zone. For the first time, the festival incorporated a route through Prague Castle, opening the Riding Hall and the South Gardens exclusively for evening visitors. Notable works included Strange Attractions by London studio United Visual Artists — a kinetic pendulum and multimedia installation presented at Kunsthalle Praha — and Silent Echoes by American sound artist Bill Fontana, installed in the Baroque refectory of the Dominican Convent, incorporating field recordings of bells from Notre-Dame de Paris and a glacial cave in the Dachstein massif. Spanish-Danish duo Desilence presented The Rhythm of the Ocean, a video mapping on the façade of the Municipal Library accompanied by music from composer Suzanne Ciani.

=== 2025 ===
The thirteenth edition (16–19 October 2025), titled Ecosystems → Solutions, presented 20 art installations across two routes — City Centre and Vinohrady — with a new Signal INSIDE zone featuring immersive works inside unconventional interiors, such as the former Savarin riding hall, the Convent of St Agnes of Bohemia, and the Archbishop's Grammar School.

The centrepiece was a large-scale projection by American video art pioneer Bill Viola titled Tristan's Ascension – The Sound of a Water Under a Waterfall, exploring themes of mortality and transcendence. Video mapping also returned to the Basilica of St Ludmila at Náměstí Míru, with the projection created by Barcelona-based studio V.P.M. For the first time in its history, Signal Festival presented a projection onto a water screen on the Vltava River — a technically complex production feat. The work, titled Tzolk'in Light, came from Taiwanese studio Peppercorns. Czech artists were also well represented, with works by the Rafani collective, sculptor Pavla Sceranková, and emerging artist Jan Poš.

== Notable artists ==
Signal Festival has presented works by internationally recognized digital, media, and light artists across its editions, including:

- Joanie Lemercier (France) — spherical projection Nimbes (2015) and View from the Moon (2021)
- Nonotak Studio (France/Japan) — immersive light and sound installation Daydream V.2, 2015
- fuse* (Italy) — real-time generated audiovisual installation Multiverse .pan, 2019
- Refik Anadol (Turkey/US) — data-driven AI projection mapping BOREALIS, 2021
- Shohei Fujimoto (Japan) — kinetic laser and light installation intangible #form, 2022
- Rafael Lozano-Hemmer (Canada/Mexico) — interactive thermal projection Thermal Drift, 2023
- United Visual Artists (UK) — kinetic installation Strange Attractions (in collaboration with Kunsthalle Praha), 2024
- Bill Fontana (United States) — sound installation Silent Echoes, 2024
- Bill Viola (United States) — video installation Tristan's Ascension, 2025
- Quayola (Italy) — algorithmic video installation and multi-screen project, 2025

The festival has also commissioned numerous original installations by prominent Czech contemporary artists, architects, and designers, including:

- The Macula (Hyperbinary) — audiovisual pioneers who co-founded the artistic direction of the festival following their milestone 2010 Old Town Astronomical Clock projection.
- Eva Jiřičná — acclaimed architect who created the site-specific installation I'm leaving the body (2019).
- Krištof Kintera — prominent sculptor known for his large-scale public light sculpture Maják (The Lighthouse), 2020.
- Jiří Černický — visual artist and Chalupecký Award laureate who presented Archaické aktuality (Archaic News), 2021.
- Maxim Velčovský — designer who created the monumental public installation consisting of burned cars from Ukraine, The Physical Possibility of Death in the Mind of Someone Living, 2022.
- Federico Díaz — multimedia artist who presented the data-driven spatial work Concrete Layers, 2023.

Furthermore, the festival actively supports emerging local practitioners through its "Signal Calling" open-call initiative and academic partnerships with major Czech art universities.

== Signal Space ==
Signal Space is a permanent year-round immersive digital art gallery opened by the Signal Festival organisers on 30 September 2025 at Rytířská 10, Prague 1, in the Old Town district of Prague. The venue occupies the Staroměstská tržnice (Old Town Market Hall), a covered market hall designed by architect Jindřich Fialka and completed in 1896. The building had stood largely unused for years before the City of Prague leased it to Signal Group following the festival organisers' application. Spanning approximately 2,500 square metres, the space combines the building's historic iron-and-glass architecture with large-format digital projections, light installations, and immersive sound environments.

The inaugural exhibition, Echoes of Tomorrow, explored themes of science, artificial intelligence, nature, and light through works by international artists including Quayola, Max Cooper, Zachary Lieberman, Playmodes Studio, and Shohei Fujimoto, among others. By March 2026, Signal Space had welcomed more than 70,000 visitors, and the exhibition was extended through June 2026 in response to continued public demand. The venue also includes a café (Space Break) and a gift shop (Space Objects).

=== Awards ===
Signal Space received the InAVation Award at the 2026 ceremony, considered the leading international honour for innovation in audiovisual and immersive technology — commonly described in the industry as the "Oscar" of the AV world. The jury cited the gallery's integration of digital art, light, sound, and movement into a cohesive immersive cultural experience. Signal Space competed against institutions including teamLab Phenomena in Abu Dhabi and the Sherwood Observatory Planetarium in the United Kingdom.

The installation Audire Fluctus by Czech artist Kryštof Brůha — created through the Signal Calling 2024 open call in collaboration with PrusaLab, the prototyping workshop of Josef Průša — won the LIT Lighting Design Award at the 2025 LIT Awards ceremony.

The exhibition Strange Attractions, created in collaboration with British studio United Visual Artists (UVA) and the Kunsthalle Praha team, received the PRIX NUMIX 2025 award in the International Digital Art category.

== Other activities ==
=== SIGNALlab ===
The festival organisers established SIGNALlab, a creative centre located in Holešovice Hall No. 40, serving as a research and production space for projects in light design and digital arts.

=== Transmit ===
Transmit is an annual professional conference and educational platform associated with the festival, launched in 2015 and aimed at light design specialists, digital artists, architects, and other practitioners. The second Transmit conference was held in March 2017.

== Awards and recognition ==
- In 2014, The Guardian named Signal Festival among Europe's top ten light art festivals.
- In 2016, the festival was designated a top-priority cultural event of Prague and the Czech Republic by Prague City Council and the Czech Ministry of Culture.
- In 2017, the Singapore daily The Straits Times listed Signal among the eight most interesting light festivals in the world.
- Travel portal Orbitz listed Signal as one of seven "mindbending" light art festivals.
- FlightNetwork.com included Signal in its ranking of the top 36 global festivals of 2017.
- Signal Space received the InAVation Award (2026) for innovation in immersive audiovisual technology, competing against teamLab Phenomena Abu Dhabi and Sherwood Observatory Planetarium UK.
- The installation Audire Fluctus won the LIT Lighting Design Award (2025).

== In popular culture ==
In the Marvel Cinematic Universe film Spider-Man: Far From Home (2019), the protagonists' school trip to Europe includes a sequence set during the Signal Festival in Prague. While authentic Prague locations were used during production, the main action sequence was filmed in Liberec, a city approximately 100 kilometres north of Prague, which was dressed with a temporary funfair to represent the festival setting.

== See also ==
- Designblok
- Prague
- Light art
