= Heather Engebretson =

American lyric soprano (born 1990)

- Born: February 21, 1990 (age 36)
- Education: Cleveland Institute of Music; Juilliard School
- Occupation: Operatic soprano
- Awards: Savonlinna Opera Festival Competition
- Website: www.heatherengebretson.com

Heather Engebretson (born February 21, 1990) is a Chinese-American operatic soprano who made a career mostly in Europe. Based at German opera ensembles for several years, she has worked freelance since 2017, and widened her repertoire from coloratura roles to leading characters such as Puccini's Madama Butterfly. She has been praised for her convincing acting as well as the expressiveness of her lyric voice, with performances including the Royal Opera House in London, the Bolshoi Theatre and Oper Frankfurt.

== Career ==
Engebretson attended the Cleveland Institute of Music, and also the Juilliard School under Edith Wiens. She was a laureate at the singing competition of the Savonlinna Opera Festival and the Hans Gabor Belvedere Singing Competition of Graz.

Her stage debut was in St. Louis, where she performed the role of Queen of the Night in Mozart's Die Zauberflöte. She also appeared in St Louis as Gretel in Humperdinck's Hänsel und Gretel. After making her Carnegie Hall debut in 2013, she began a European career at the Staatsoper Hannover, where her roles included Oscar in Verdi's Un ballo in maschera, Zerlina in Mozart's Don Giovanni, Musetta in Puccini's La Bohème and Tytania in Britten's A Midsummer Night's Dream. She was a member of the Staatsoper Wiesbaden from 2014, where she appeared in the title role of Verdi's La Traviata, Konstanze in Mozart's Die Entführung aus dem Serail, Fiordiligi in Così fan tutte, the title role in Handel's Alcina, and Lucy in Die Dreigroschenoper. She then moved on to the Staatsoper Hamburg in 2015 and has worked freelance since 2017. She returned to Wiesbaden to perform Cherubino in Mozart's Le nozze di Figaro and Gilda in Verdi's Rigoletto.

Engebretson appeared as a guest performer at opera houses including the Royal Opera House in London, where she performed first as Barbarina in Le nozze di Figaro, then as Sophie in Massenet's Werther in 2016, and the Voice of Forest Bird in Wagner's Siegfried. A reviewer from The Guardian noted: "Bright-toned American soprano Heather Engebretson is genuinely touching as Charlotte’s younger sister Sophie, skilfully suggesting a teenager disconcertingly inundated by novel feelings ...". She appeared as Alcina at the Bolshoi Theatre and the Staatstheater Stuttgart, as the four leading ladies in Offenbach's Les contes d'Hoffmann at the Deutsche Oper Berlin, as Mimi in Puccini's La bohème at the Komische Oper Berlin, as Liù in Puccini's Turandot at the Opéra Royal de Wallonie in Liège, and as Donna Anna in Mozart's Don Giovanni at the Teatro Lirico di Cagliari.

In 2022 she portrayed the title role of Puccini's Madama Butterfly for the first time, at the Oper Frankfurt directed by R. B. Schlather and conducted by Antonello Manacorda, with Evan LeRoy Johnson as Pinkerton. A reviewer from the FAZ noted that her voice "can tremble with panic and shine with hope". She appeared as Puccini's Liú at the 2024 Internationale Maifestspiele Wiesbaden, conducted by Yoel Gamzou and with stage direction and scenic design by Daniela Kerck, who gave Liú prominence in the story, identifying Prince Calaf with Puccini and Liú with his housekeeper who is active on stage for most of the time. A reviewer from the Frankfurter Rundschau noted her radiance in acting and her effortless voice.

In concert, Engebretson appeared in Mahler's Eighth Symphony at both the Elbphilharmonie in Hamburg and the Dresden Philharmonie. She also performed in his Second Symphony with the Moscow State Symphony Orchestra. She appeared in Schubert's Mass in G major at Carnegie Hall in New York City, Verdi's Requiem in Nürnberg, Orff's Carmina Burana with both the Dortmunder Philharmoniker and the Munich Symphony Orchestra, Beethoven's Ninth Symphony with the Xi’an Symphony Orchestra, and Britten's War Requiem in Mannheim, conducted by Alexander Soddy.
