= Joshua Kosman =

American music critic (born 1959)

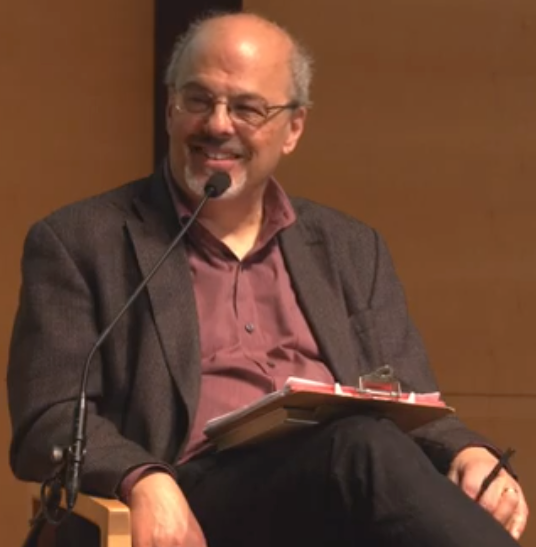
- In a discussion at the San Francisco Public Library in 2019
- Born: October 27, 1959 (age 66); Boston, Massachusetts
- Education: Yale College; UC Berkeley
- Occupation: Music critic
- Notable credit: San Francisco Chronicle
- Website: pacificaisle.blogspot.com

Joshua Kosman (born October 27, 1959) is an American music critic who specializes in classical music. Kosman was the chief classical music critic of the San Francisco Chronicle from 1988 to 2024, with a particular interest in contemporary classical music, championing composers such as John Adams and Aaron Jay Kernis. Described by the music critic Jayson Greene as having a "congenial, probing tone that blends a reporter’s instincts with a critic’s acumen," he has written for a variety of other publications.

== Life and career ==
Joshua Kosman was born in Boston, Massachusetts on October 27, 1959. He attended Yale College, receiving a Bachelor of Arts, and the University of California, Berkeley for a Master of Arts.

From 1988 to 2024, Kosman was a music critic of the San Francisco Chronicle. He was hand-picked in 1993 by the music critic Robert Commanday to succeed him as chief classical music critic for the Chronicle. He frequently wrote on contemporary classical music, promoting composers such as John Adams, Aaron Jay Kernis, Michael Gordon, Chen Yi, and Lisa Bielawa. Other topics Kosman engaged with included "orchestral management" and the pianist David Helfgott, who came into the spotlight after the movie 1996 Shine. The music critic Jayson Greene described Kosman as having a "congenial, probing tone that blends a reporter’s instincts with a critic’s acumen." Kosman retired from the Chronicle in late April 2024; writer Andrew Gilbert described him as "an essential component of the Bay Area’s arts ecosystem, providing pithy and cogent criticism and a form of institutional memory that can’t be replaced." According to Kosman, “It’s been made pretty clear that there won’t be somebody hired who will [replace me as the new] classical music critic."

His writing credits span numerous other publications, including Bookforum, Gramophone, The Journal of Musicology, Opernwelt, Piano & Keyboard, Symphony, as well as The New Grove Dictionary of Music and Musicians and New Grove Dictionary of Opera. Kosman won awards from the Society of Professional Journalists, the San Francisco Peninsula Press Club, and ASCAP, who gave him the 2006 Deems Taylor Award for music criticism. He is a former vice president of the Music Critics Association of North America. He maintains a classical music blog, On a Pacific Aisle.

Outside of music, Kosman made weekly cryptic crosswords for The Nation from 2011 to 2020.

== Selected writings ==
- Kosman, Joshua (June 2008). "New Music for a New Century". The Arts Today. 3 (1). ISBN 978-1-4289-6734-2.
- —— (November 5, 2021). "Review: Gustavo Gimeno makes a triumphant first appearance with S.F. Symphony". San Francisco Chronicle.
- —— (June 19, 2023). "Kronos Quartet spreads the word for contemporary music to a new generation of performers". San Francisco Chronicle Datebook.
- ——; Janiak, Lily (June 21, 2023). "Dramatically shifting Grants for the Arts priorities point to changing S.F. arts landscape". San Francisco Chronicle.
- —— (April 23, 2024). "'So what'd you think?' A music critic draws the curtain on a career of asking questions". San Francisco Chronicle.
