= Signal Space =

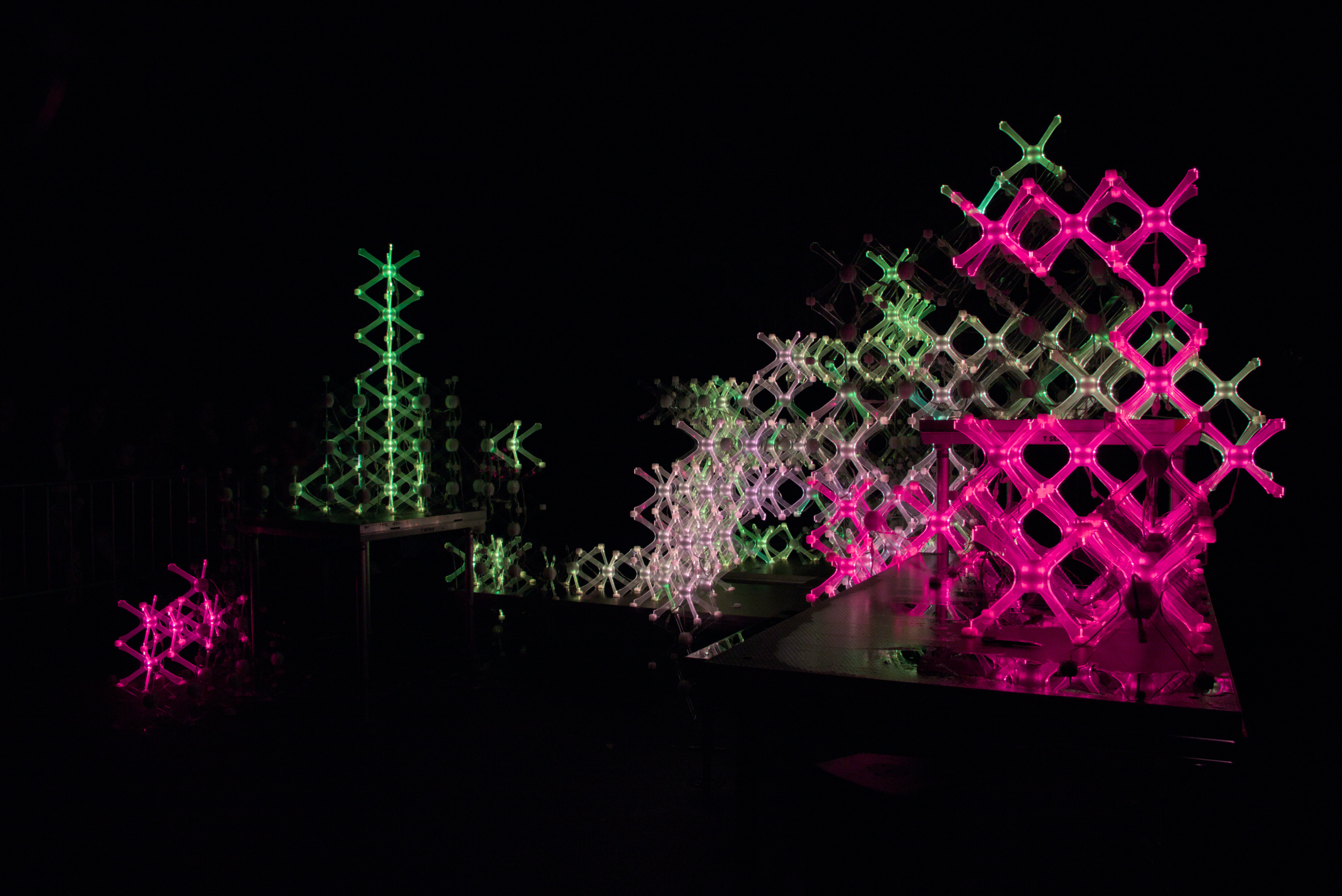
- Signal Space gallery exhibition
- Established: 1 October 2025
- Location: Rytířská 10, Prague 1, Czech Republic
- Type: Digital art gallery
- Director: Martin Pošta
- Website: www.signalspace.com

Signal Space or Signal Space Digital Art Gallery & Museum is a permanent gallery of digital art and immersive media in the centre of Prague, Czech Republic. It opened on 1 October 2025 in an old town 19th-century market hall. Opening of the gallery was part of the 2025 edition of the Signal Festival. The gallery was founded by Martin Pošta, a producer and curator who co-founded the annual Signal Festival.

== Background ==
Signal Festival is Prague's annual festival of light and digital art established in 2013. After it grew into an important cultural event in national context, its organisers created a permanent venue for digital art called Signal Space gallery, which opened on 1 October 2025 as part of the festival's programme.

== Venue ==
Signal Space is part of a former municipal market hall in central Prague, near the Můstek metro station. The cast-iron building, with an arched central nave and clerestory skylights, was adapted as a permanent venue for digital art installations. According to Fisheye Immersive, the main gallery comprises about 1,300 square metres of modular exhibition space. The venue includes a large-format 360-degree projection hall and several smaller rooms, and hosts a rotating showcase of Czech artists.

== Exhibitions ==
=== Echoes of Tomorrow (2025–2026) ===
The gallery's opening exhibition, Echoes of Tomorrow presented works by digital and media artists focused on technology, perception and the future. Featured works included Everything by the Istanbul studio Nohlab, intangible #form by Shohei Fujimoto, Fighters by Quayola and Max Cooper, a generative environment by Markos Kay, and the interactive Body Sketches / Scale Studies by Zach Lieberman. The gallery reported more than 70,000 visitors by March 2026, and the exhibition was extended in response to public demand.

== Reception and awards ==
In February 2026, Signal Space won in the Arts & Experience category at the InAVation Awards, an international honour in audiovisual and immersive technology, where it was recognised alongside projects including teamLab Phenomena Abu Dhabi. Prague's Councillor for Culture, Tomáš Slabihoudek, described the win as a success for the city's cultural scene.

== Organisation ==
Signal Space is part of the Prague-based organisation Signal, which also runs Signal Festival and the production studio Signal Creative. It was founded by Czech entrepreneur Martin Pošta.

== See also ==
- Signal Festival
- Digital art
