= International Contemporary Ensemble =

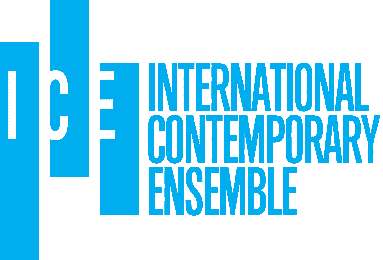

Background information
- Origin: Chicago, Illinois, United States
- Genres: Contemporary Classical, Experimental
- Years active: 2001-present
- Labels: Tundra, Nonesuch, Kairos, Bridge, Naxos, Tzadik, New Focus, New Amsterdam, Mode
- Website: http://www.iceorg.org

The International Contemporary Ensemble (ICE) is a contemporary classical music ensemble, based in New York City. ICE performs a diverse and extensive array of chamber, electro-acoustic, improvisatory, and multimedia works.

== History ==
The International Contemporary Ensemble was founded in Chicago in 2001 by Claire Chase (Ensemble flautist and former executive director). The early ensemble—consisting primarily of alumni from the Oberlin Conservatory in Ohio—presented its first Chicago concert at the Three Arts Club in January 2002. In the following year, the Ensemble made its New York City debut at the Miller Theatre.

Since its founding, the Ensemble has premiered over 500 compositions, many of these commissions and collaborations spawning from their noteworthy residency programs: the 21st Century Young Composers Project and ICElab. In addition to commissioning emerging composers, the ensemble has also premiered numerous works by world-renowned composers, including Georges Aperghis, Alvin Lucier, Pauline Oliveros, John Zorn, David Lang, Liza Lim, Dai Fujikura, Chaya Czernowin, Julio Estrada, Amir Shpilman, George E. Lewis, Anna Thorvaldsdottir, and Carla Kihlstedt, among others.

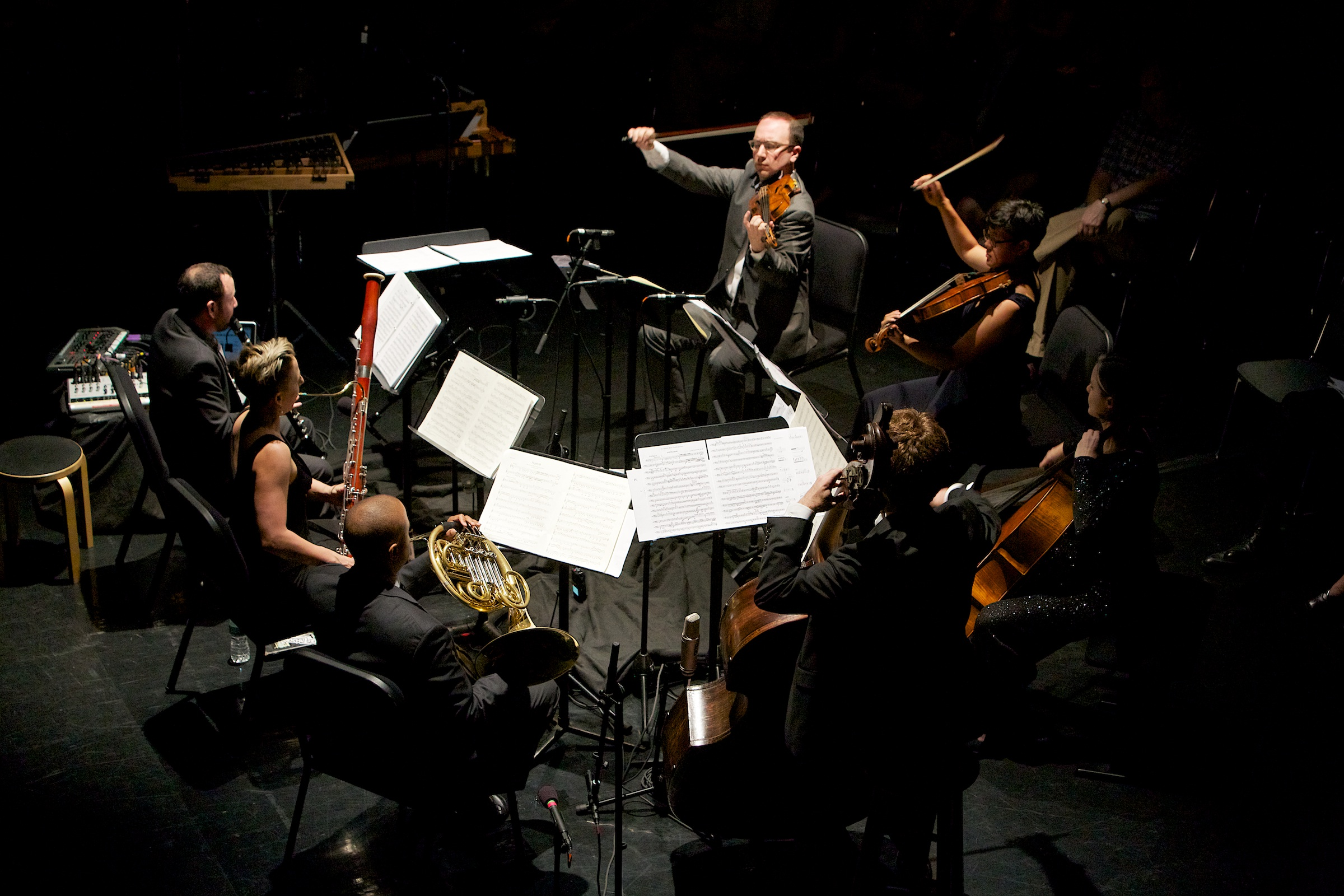
ICE performing at the Mostly Mozart Festival on August 22, 2013.

The International Contemporary Ensemble has performed at the Lincoln Center Festival (New York), Musica Nova Helsinki (Finland), Wien Modern (Austria), Acht Brücken Music for Cologne (Germany), La Cité de la Musique (Paris), the Darmstädter Ferienkurse (Germany), Mostly Mozart Festival (New York), as well as tours of Japan, Brazil and France. They have held residencies at the Museum of Contemporary Art Chicago, Mostly Mozart Festival, New York University, Columbia College (Chicago), and Conservatorio de las Rosas (Morelia, Mexico), among others.

The International Contemporary Ensemble is currently based in Brooklyn, New York with George E. Lewis serving as their artistic director.

== Members ==
ICE is a flexible collective of thirty-eight performing artists, including strings, woodwinds, piano, percussion, voice, composers, and light and sound designers. As an artist-run organization, most of ICE's executive leadership, concert production, marketing, fundraising, technology and database systems are managed by members of the ensemble.

- Vimbayi Kaziboni (Artist in Residence, Conductor)
- Steven Schick (Artist in Residence)
- Isabel Gleicher (Flute)
- Alice Teyssier (Flute, Voice)
- James Austin Smith (Oboe)
- Campbell MacDonald (Clarinet)
- Joshua Rubin (Clarinet)
- Emmalie Tello (Clarinet)
- Darius Jones (Saxophone)
- Erin Rogers (Saxophone)
- Alexander Davis (Bassoon)
- Rebekah Heller (Bassoon, Conductor)
- Gareth Flowers (Trumpet)
- Jonathan Finlayson (Trumpet)
- David Byrd-Marrow (Horn)
- Mike Lormand (Trombone)
- Nathan Davis (Percussion)
- Ross Karre (Percussion)
- Levy Lorenzo (Percussion, Electronics)
- Clara Warnaar (Percussion, Drums)
- Erika Dohi (Piano)
- Jacob Greenberg (Piano)
- Cory Smythe (Piano)
- Bridget Kibbey (Harp)
- Nuiko Wadden (Harp)
- Daniel Lippel (Guitar)
- Gabriela Díaz (Violin)
- Modney (Violin)
- Kyle Armbrust (Viola)
- Wendy Richman (Viola)
- Kivie Cahn-Lipman (Cello)
- Katinka Kleijn (Cello)
- Michael Nicolas (Cello)
- Randall Zigler (Bass)
- Tony Arnold (Soprano)
- Peter Tantsits (Tenor)
- Fay Victor (Vocalist)
- Nicholas Houfek (Lighting Designer)
- Daniel Rodier (Technical Director)
- Claire Chase (Flute, emeritus)
- Matana Roberts (Emeritus)
- Jennifer Curtis (Violin, emeritus)
- David Bowlin (Violin, emeritus)
- Maiya Papach (Viola, emeritus)
- Phyllis Chen (Piano, emeritus)
- Nick Masterson (Oboe, emeritus)
- Ryan Muncy (Saxophone, emeritus / in Memoriam)
- Peter Evans (Trumpet, emeritus)
- Dan Peck (Tuba, emeritus)

== Discography ==
- B I O M E I.I Kate Gentile, International Contemporary Ensemble (Obliquity Records, 2023)
- isomonstrosity isomonstrosity, International Contemporary Ensemble (Brassland, 2022)
- Proving Up Missy Mazzoli, Royce Vavrek, Opera Omaha, International Contemporary Ensemble, Christopher Rountree (PentaTone, 2020)
- Coalescence Cycle Vol. 1: Music for Soloists and Electronics Rand Steiger, International Contemporary Ensemble (New Focus Recordings, 2019)
- Modules ExclusiveOr, Architeuthis Walks On Land, International Contemporary Ensemble (Carrier Records, 2019)
- Anatomy Theater David Lang, Mark Dion, International Contemporary Ensemble, Christopher Rountree (Cantaloupe Music, 2019)
- Hagoromo Nathan Davis, International Contemporary Ensemble, Brooklyn Youth Chorus, Katalin Károlyi, Peter Tantsits (Tundra, New Focus Recordings, 2018)
- End Stages; Violin Concerto Michael Hersch, Patricia Kopatchinskaja, International Contemporary Ensemble, Orpheus Chamber Orchestra (New Focus Recordings, 2018)
- Seven Responses The Crossing, International Contemporary Ensemble, Donald Nally (Innova Recordings, 2017)
- Wintersongs Chaya Czernowin - International Contemporary Ensemble, Steven Schick, Jeffrey Gavett, Kai Wessel (Kairos, 2017)
- Æsopica Marcos Balter, International Contemporary Ensemble (Tundra, New Focus Recordings, 2016)
- The Will to Adorn George Lewis, International Contemporary Ensemble (Tundra, 2016)
- Afterglow composer Keeril Makan (Mode, 2013)

With Dai Fujikura

- Ice Dai Fujikura, International Contemporary Ensemble, Jayce Ogren, Matthew Ward (Kairos, 2013)

With Du Yun

- Dinosaur Scar Du Yun, International Contemporary Ensemble (Tudra, 2018)

With John Zorn

- On the Torment of Saints, the Casting of Spells and the Evocation of Spirits (Tzadik, 2013)

With John Adams

- Son Of Chamber Symphony / String Quartet St. Lawrence String Quartet (Nonesuch, 2011)
