= Phyllis Chen =

American composer (born 1978)

- Born: 1978 (age 47–48)
- Education: Oberlin Conservatory of Music; Northwestern University; Jacobs School of Music
- Occupations: Composer; sound artist; pianist
- Employer: State University of New York at New Paltz
- Awards: Guggenheim Fellowship (2022)

Academic background
- Thesis: Inventions on the Keyboard (2015)
- Doctoral advisor: André Watts
- Musical career
- Genre: Contemporary classical
- Instrument: Toy piano
- Formerly of: International Contemporary Ensemble

Phyllis Chen (born 1978) is an American composer, sound artist, and pianist. A member of the International Contemporary Ensemble, she co-composed their 2016 album On The Nature Of Thingness and is a 2022 Guggenheim Fellow. After suffering from tendinopathy, she began doing work on the toy piano, including an album and music festival both named UnCaged Toy Piano.

== Biography ==
Chen, a native of Blacksburg, Virginia, was born in 1978, daughter of Dan and Jenny Chen. She started learning piano as a young child. After attending the Eastern Music Festival summer camp, she graduated from Blacksburg High School in 1995, one year earlier than her class.

Despite receiving acceptance offers from other prestigious music schools, she ultimately chose Oberlin Conservatory of Music, where she then obtained her BM. She then got a MM at Northwestern University and DMA at Jacobs School of Music; her doctoral dissertation Inventions on the Keyboard was supervised by André Watts.

In 2001, she joined the International Contemporary Ensemble (ICE) as one of their founding members. In 2011, she played the piano for several pieces she composed for ICE at the Museum of Contemporary Photography in Chicago. In 2016, she and Nathan Davis composed the ICE's album On The Nature Of Thingness. She eventually became Artist Emeritus at ICE.

As she once recalled, she "never found [the piano] to be entirely fulfilling [and] always thought there was something missing". After both of her arms became sore from tendinopathy, she started playing the smaller toy piano, which she had discovered during her studies at Indiana. She started the UnCaged Toy Piano festival in 2007 to promote the instrument, and she also composed a toy piano album of the same name. She was the toy pianist for the 2009 musical Coraline at the Lucille Lortel Theatre. She also performed the toy piano at the 2012 Ringling International Arts Festival, where Gayle Williams of Sarasota Herald-Tribune said that Chen "has enough imagination for all of us". During a review of her April 2013 performance at the Atlas Performing Arts Center, Stephen Brookes of The Washington Post called Chen "a virtuoso of the toy piano". Steve Smith of The New York Times called her a "leading proponent of the toy piano as a vehicle for serious music", while Xenia Pestova Bennett called her one of the pioneers of the Schoenhut 372 and its open-lid counterpart 379.

She originally composed with pseudonyms before a friend approached her about talking with a composer who was actually Chen herself. Her Baryshnikov Arts Center commission Lighting the Dark premiered in December 2014; Corinna da Fonseca-Wollheim of The New York Times said that it "offered a slyly subversive take on issues relating to femininity, technology and power". In 2015, she composed Curios for the Singapore International Festival of Arts, performed by Margaret Leng Tan; Marcus Cheng Chye Tan called it an "important work to evaluate Tan's theatrimusicality". In 2022, she was awarded a Guggenheim Fellowship in Music Composition. Her piece "Sumitones" was performed at the 2024 Schubert Club International Artist Series in Ordway Center for the Performing Arts.

She has also worked at State University of New York at New Paltz as assistant professor of music composition.

She lives in Astoria, Queens.
