= R. B. Schlather =

American stage director (born 1986)

- Born: 1986 (age 38–39); Cooperstown, New York, U.S.
- Occupation: Stage director
- Website: www.rbschlather.com

R. B. Schlather (born 1986) is an American stage director especially for opera who has worked internationally. He has directed world premieres of operas by Hertzberg, The Wake World and The Rose Elf. He made his debut in Europe at Oper Frankfurt with Handel's Tamerlano in 2019, returning in 2021 for Cimarosa's L'Italiana in Londra and in 2022 for Puccini's Madama Butterfly.

== Career ==
Born in Cooperstown, New York, he received his first opera impressions when his parents took him to the Glimmerglass Festival nearby. He took part in the Boston Lyric Opera's Emerging Artist Program in the 2014/15 season.

He directed In The Penal Colony by Philip Glass for the Boston Lyric Opera in 2015, and Doctor Atomic by John Adams at the Curtis Opera Theater in Philadelphia. He was artist in residence at the National Sawdust in Brooklyn in the 2016/17 season. He directed Virgil Thomson's The Mother of Us All in 2017, named one of the best new operas of 2017 by The New York Times. He directed the world premieres of Hertzberg operas, The Wake World in 2017, acknowledged by the Music Critics Association of North America as Best New Opera, and the chamber opera The Rose Elf in 2018. The Rose Elf was played underground at the Green-Wood Cemetery in Brooklyn, and received WQXR's Freddi Award. Schlather directed Mozart's Don Giovanni again in Philadelphia, and Cosi fan tutte at the Santa Fe Opera.

He made his debut in Europe directing Handel's Tamerlano at the Oper Frankfurt in 2019 on the Bockenheimer Depot stage. He returned to the house in 2021 to direct Cimarosa's L'Italiana in Londra in the opera house, originally planned for 2020 but postponed due to the COVID-19 pandemic. The reviewer from the FAZ noted that the production brought frequent laughter in the tradition of the commedia dell'arte; the opera had been played in Frankfurt in 1783, a few years after its premiere in Rome. He wrote that the five comedy characters were sharply outlined, in actions defined by the music. The opera was conducted by Leo Hussain who also played the Fortepiano continuo in the recitatives. In 2022, he directed there Puccini's Madama Butterfly, on an almost empty stage with two sliding walls and playing in a contemporary setting alluding to sex tourism, without historic exoticism. The reviewer from the FAZ noted that the brutal actions of the plot take place behind the walls and in the spectator's imagination, while what is visible is notable in its discretion and in its reliance on the music.
