= Paul Hume (music critic) =

American music critic (1915–2001)

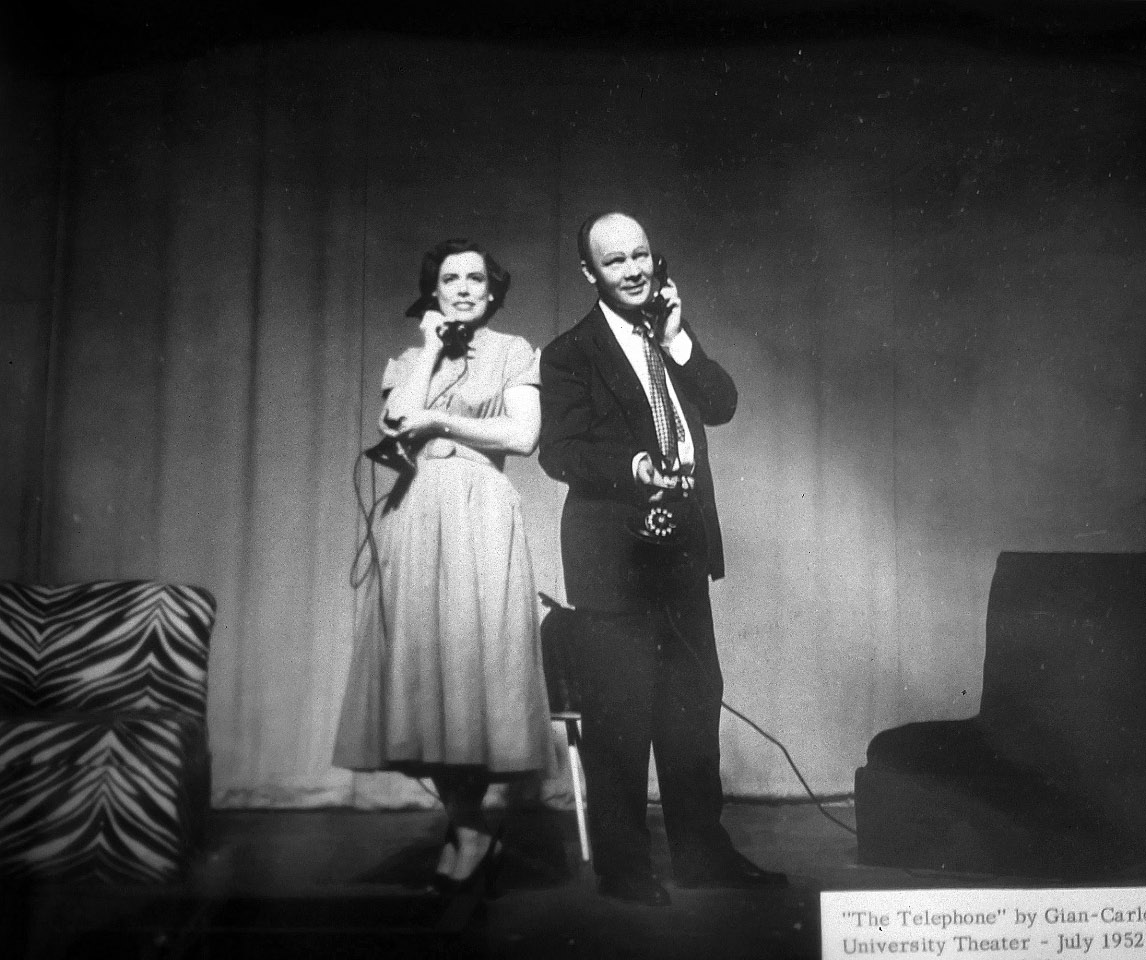
- Paul Hume and Marie Handy performing Gian Carlo Menotti's comic opera The Telephone, or L'Amour à trois at Catholic University, Washington DC, 1952
- Born: Paul Chandler Hume; December 13, 1915; Chicago, Illinois
- Died: November 27, 2001 (aged 85); Baltimore, Maryland
- Education: University of Chicago
- Occupations: Music critic; author
- Notable credit: The Washington Post

Paul Chandler Hume (December 13, 1915 – November 27, 2001) was an American music critic and author who specialized in classical music. He was the music editor for The Washington Post from 1946 to 1982.

== Life and career ==
Hume was born in Chicago, Illinois, on December 13, 1915. Hume attended the University of Chicago, receiving a Bachelor of Arts in 1937 after studying music and English.

In addition to his role as the Post music editor, Hume hosted a long-running classical music program on WGMS radio in Washington, D.C., and was guest commentator for the New York Metropolitan Opera intermission broadcasts. He was also a professor of music at Georgetown University from 1950 to 1977 and adjunct professor of music at Yale University from 1975 to 1983. He was a member of the American Association of University Professors, the Music Critics Association of North America, and the Cosmos Club. He received a Peabody Award in 1977 for his outstanding achievement in music criticism, and received honorary degrees from Thiel College, Rosary College, and Georgetown University. In addition, he published several books, including Catholic Church Music (1956), where he refers in passing to himself as a Catholic convert from Protestantism; and a biography of Verdi (1977).

Hume died on November 27, 2001, in Baltimore, Maryland.

== Truman incident ==
Hume was best known for his critical review in December 1950 of a concert by Margaret Truman and the scathing letter he later received from her father, President Harry S. Truman. Truman called Hume "an eight ulcer man on four ulcer pay." He further told him:

It seems to me that you are a frustrated old man who wishes he could have been successful. When you write such poppy-cock as was in the back section of the paper you work for it shows conclusively that you're off the beam and at least four of your ulcers are at work.

Some day I hope to meet you. When that happens you'll need a new nose, a lot of beef steak for black eyes, and perhaps a supporter below!

[Westbrook] Pegler, a guttersnipe, is a gentleman alongside you. I hope you'll accept that statement as a worse insult than a reflection on your ancestry.

Truman was criticized by many for the letter. However, he pointed out that he wrote it as a loving father and not as the president. Years later, Hume and Truman did meet when Hume paid him a visit at the Truman Presidential Library. There, Truman showed Hume around the library, which Hume later recalled as a "wonderful visit."

== Awards and honors ==
In honor of Hume's great influence on American music, on October 20, 1979, he was awarded the prestigious University of Pennsylvania Glee Club Award of Merit. Established in 1964, this award sought "to bring a declaration of appreciation to an individual each year that has made a significant contribution to the world of music and helped to create a climate in which our talents may find valid expression."
