= Donald Rosenberg =

American musician, music critic and journalist

Donald Rosenberg (born 1951) is an American musician, music critic and journalist.

== Biography ==
Rosenberg was born in New York City and educated at the Mannes College of Music and the Yale School of Music. He is a horn player, who participated in the Aspen Music Festival and Marlboro Music Festival.

Rosenberg wrote for the Akron Beacon Journal from 1977–89, then for The Pittsburgh Press (1989–92) and Cleveland's The Plain Dealer from 1992. The Cleveland Orchestra Story (ISBN 1-886228-24-8), his 700-page book on the history of the Cleveland Orchestra, was published in 2000. He was removed from his position as principal classical music critic of The Plain Dealer in 2008, reportedly for his criticism of Franz Welser-Möst, the music director of the Cleveland Orchestra. Rosenberg took legal action against The Plain Dealer and The Cleveland Orchestra as a result, and was unsuccessful in this lawsuit. Rosenberg was laid off from The Plain Dealer in 2013.

Rosenberg served four terms as president of the Music Critics Association of North America. In March 2014, he was named editor of EMAg (Early Music America Magazine), serving until the end of 2021. He was a visiting teacher at the Oberlin Conservatory of Music from 2011-18.
