= Robert Commanday =

American music critic (1922–2015)

- Born: Robert Paul Commanday; June 18, 1922; Yonkers, New York
- Died: September 3, 2015 (aged 93); Oakland, California
- Education: Harvard University; Juilliard School; UC Berkeley
- Occupation: Music critic
- Notable credits: San Francisco Chronicle; SF Classical Voice

Robert Paul Commanday (June 18, 1922 – September 3, 2015) was an American music critic who specialized in classical music. Among the leading critics of the West Coast, Commanday was a major presence in the Bay Area music scene over a five-decade career. From 1964 to 1994 he was the chief classical music critic of the San Francisco Chronicle, following which he became the founding editor of San Francisco Classical Voice in 1998.

As a critic, Commanday held high standards, though his writing was interspersed with humorous comments. His focus concerned American music in general, but particularly ensembles, performers and events in San Francisco. Also a music educator and choral conductor, Commanday held brief teaching posts at Ithaca College and the University of Illinois, before a decade of teaching music and conducting choirs at the University of California, Berkeley.

== Early life and education ==
Robert Paul Commanday was born on June 18, 1922, in Yonkers, New York. Of a Russian-Jewish family, his parents "loved music and prized education above all". The family regularly traveled to Manhattan for a variety of classical music performances, including the premiere of Gershwin's Porgy and Bess. In addition, the family also attended operetta performances of works by Sigmund Romberg as well as Gilbert and Sullivan. Commanday studied flute in his early youth with John Wummer, the then–principal flutist of the New York Philharmonic. By his teens he had become an enthusiast of jazz music, and frequented the Village Vanguard jazz club.

He enrolled at Harvard University to study music theory and music history, receiving a Bachelor of Arts in 1943. That year, he joined the U.S. Army for World War II, where he served as a cryptographer of encoded Japanese. Stationed in Washington, D.C., he remained able to speak and read Japanese for the rest of his life. Following the war's end, Commanday attended Juilliard for piano from 1946 to 1947, and had two teaching stints, at Ithaca College (1947–1948) as well as the University of Illinois (1948–1950). The composer Andrew Imbrie, who Commanday had met during the war, invited him to the University of California, Berkeley, where he received a Master of Arts in 1952 for musicology. During and after his study, from 1951 to 1961, he also taught music at UC Berkeley, and, from 1950 to 1963, led the university's choral association. The groups he engaged with were the university's Glee Club and the Treble Clef Society; with the former, he toured Japan in 1957 as the first American choral group to do so after the war. Later he directed the chorus of the Oakland Symphony Orchestra (1961–1965), as well as the choir of the Cabrillo Festival around 1963.

== Career and later life ==
"I don’t regret or withdraw a single carping article or castigating review. The standards I had held to were not set by me but by the works and the art form first and then by the artists and performing institution themselves. They also are measured by what we have come to expect of them and what they claim and aim to be."

"In that sense, evaluating is an act of respect. A symphony, opera or ballet company can’t aspire to be "world class" (a ridiculous term in any event) and profess it in the publicity and then feel it should not be judged on those terms."

— Robert Commanday, June 1993
Sunday Pink section, SF Chronicle

Commanday's first major music criticism position came in 1964, when he became the chief classical music critic and a dance critic of the San Francisco Chronicle, succeeding Alfred Frankenstein. Up to that point, his writing experience mainly concerned program notes and academic articles. He credits being an "inveterate letter writer" as important to the growth of his style of criticism. His predecessor Frankenstein also influenced Commanday by way of the stylistic freedom and humor that characterized his writing. Adopting such aspects into his own writing, writer Janos Gereben noted that "[Commanday]'s sense of humor was cherished by all (but aggrieved performers) who knew him." In Grove Music Online, Patrick J. Smith describes him an "erudite and informed writer", while Joshua Kosman of SFGate stated that he had "exacting standards". Topics of particular interest to Commanday included the San Francisco music scene since 1850, music education and American music, especially American music after 1950 and American opera. His writings were often inextricably tied to San Francisco; according to Smith, he "was a champion of local composers and musical organizations". His colleague Jon Carroll at the San Francisco Chronicle noted that he "always seemed to know more about his subject than he could fit into an article". Commanday retired from the SF Chronicle in 1994, and was succeeded by Joshua Kosman—whom he had handpicked—as chief classical music critic.

Commanday reportedly quipped that he "flunked retirement"; following his SF Chronicle tenure, he aimed to launch an online news site for the classical music scene of San Francisco. He was motivated by the decline in the circulation of print newspaper, as well as his claim that much important and relevant information was ignored by local newspapers. Having secured preliminary funding from businessman Gordon Getty, he worked with his wife, Mary Stevens Commanday, to create San Francisco Classical Voice (SFCV) in 1998. The presence of an online classical music news website (particularly pertaining to a specific local culture) was relatively new at the time, and the site served as a model for various other websites, including the Classical Voice of North Carolina, Classical Voice New England and Classical Voice North America (run by the MCANA).

Described by Janos Gereben of the San Francisco Classical Voice as an "inspiring gadfly to generations of musicians, audiences, and journalists", Commanday was a music critic, music educator and choral conductor. Among the major music critics of the U.S. West Coast, His career spanned over 50 years and he was unofficially known as the "Dean of the Bay Area's music press corps". Commanday wrote numerous entries for various editions of The New Grove Dictionary of Music and Musicians and the subsequent Grove Music Online. He was president of the Music Critics Association of North America (MCANA) two times, first, from 1981 to 1985. The ASCAP awarded him the Deems Taylor Award for Music Criticism in 1975–1976 and he won the 1975 John Swett Award from the California Teachers Association. Both the Il Cenacolo society and the Harvard Club of San Francisco recognized him as 'citizen of the year'.

In his later years, he continued writing musical essays for publications such as the San Francisco Classical Voice and Classical Voice North America. Commanday died on September 3, 2015, in Oakland, California. He was survived by his wife Mary, as well as daughter Michal, and son David, who conducts the Heartland Festival Orchestra of Peoria, Illinois. Among his stepchildren was the diplomat J. Christopher Stevens, who died in the 2012 Benghazi attack. The Online Archive of California of the California Digital Library contains a substantial collection of papers by Commanday.

== Selected writings ==
- Commanday, Robert (2001). "Peterson, Wayne T.". Grove Music Online. Oxford: Oxford University Press. doi:10.1093/gmo/9781561592630.article.42628. ISBN 978-1-56159-263-0. (subscription, Wikilibrary access, or UK public library membership required)
- ——; Albright, Thomas; Beeks, Graydon (2005) [2001]. "San Francisco". Grove Music Online. Oxford: Oxford University Press. doi:10.1093/gmo/9781561592630.article.24512. ISBN 978-1-56159-263-0. (subscription, Wikilibrary access, or UK public library membership required)
- —— (July 21, 2012). A Millennium in 50 Years: The Discovery of Early Music (Speech). Festival and Academy of the American Bach Soloists in the Caroline H. Hume Concert Hall at the San Francisco Conservatory of Music. Archived from the original on September 29, 2022.
- —— (2013). "Youth ensembles". Grove Music Online. Oxford: Oxford University Press. doi:10.1093/gmo/9781561592630.article.A2263415. ISBN 978-1-56159-263-0. (subscription, Wikilibrary access, or UK public library membership required)
- Beeks, Graydon; ——; Mehrens, Christopher E. (2013). "California, University of". Grove Music Online. Oxford: Oxford University Press. doi:10.1093/gmo/9781561592630.article.A2266849. ISBN 978-1-56159-263-0. (subscription, Wikilibrary access, or UK public library membership required)
