= The Rose Elf (opera) =

Opera by David Hertzberg

- Opera by David Hertzberg
- Language: English
- Based on: The Elf of the Rose by Hans Christian Andersen
- Premiere: 6 June 2018; Green-Wood Cemetery, Brooklyn

The Rose Elf is a one act chamber opera with music and libretto by David Hertzberg, based on the fairy tale The Elf of the Rose by Hans Christian Andersen. It premiered June 6, 2018, in the Catacombs of Green-Wood Cemetery in Brooklyn, New York City, in a production directed by R. B. Schlather and conducted by Teddy Poll. The opera's debut recording was released October 31, 2020, by Meyer Media LLC (MM20044).

== Roles ==
| Role | Voice type | Premiere cast, June 6, 2018 (Conductor: Teddy Poll) |
|---|---|---|
| The Elf | mezzo-soprano | Samantha Hankey |
| The Girl/Luna | soprano | Alisa Jordheim |
| The Beloved/Horus | tenor | Kyle Bielfield |
| The Brother | bass-baritone | Andrew Bogard |

== Instrumentation ==
Clarinet, horn, percussion, piano, 2 violins, viola, violoncello, bass.

== Critical reception ==
Of the premiere, the Observer wrote, "just about everything you want opera to be. The Rose Elf shocked, confounded, disturbed, and, in the end, exalted."

Following the premiere, WQXR named it the 'Opera Event of the Half Year', saying, "Hertzberg is a masterful dramatist... this one signals the arrival of a major compositional personality."

Opera News called the work, "a compelling and welcome addition to the operatic canon."

The Rose Elf was subsequently named among 'New York's Most Memorable Concerts of 2018' and awarded Operavore's 'Freddie' Award for Best New Opera

== Recording ==
- 2020: Robert Kahn, conductor; Samantha Hankey, Sydney Mancasola, Kirk Dougherty, Andrew Bogard. Meyer Media LLC (MM20044).
