= The Wake World =

Opera by David Hertzberg

- Opera by David Hertzberg
- Language: English
- Based on: The Wake World by Aleister Crowley
- Premiere: 18 September 2017; Barnes Foundation, Philadelphia

The Wake World is an opera with music and libretto by David Hertzberg. It premiered September 18, 2017, at the Barnes Foundation in Philadelphia. The Wake World was a co-presentation of Opera Philadelphia and the Barnes Foundation, directed by R. B. Schlather and conducted by Elizabeth Braden. The opera is based on the story "The Wake World" by Aleister Crowley. The opera's debut recording was released April 24, 2020 on Tzadik Records.

== Critical reception ==
"The whole evening felt celebratory", Opera News wrote of The Wake World. The New York Times called the music engrossing. "Just five instrumentalists produce wondrous colors and sonorities. The score, spiked with modernist elements, makes Mr. Hertzberg seem a 21st-century Ravel", wrote Anthony Tommasini.

"The prose was purple, and so was the music, so thoroughly an antique musical language that it sounded like a half-remembered dream", wrote Peter Dobrin in The Philadelphia Inquirer.

In 2018, The Wake World was awarded the Music Critics Association of North America Award for Best New Opera.

The New York Times listed the track "Is that you, my love?" from the opera's debut recording among 'The 25 Best Classical Music Tracks of 2020'.

== Roles ==
Roles, voice types, premiere cast
Role	Voice type	Premiere cast, 18 September 2017 Conductor: Elizabeth Braden
Lola	soprano	Maeve Höglund
The Fairy Prince	mezzo-soprano	Rihab Chaieb
Parthenope	soprano	Rebecca Myers
Ligeia	soprano	Veronica Chapman-Smith
Leucosia	mezzo-soprano	Joanna Gates
Luna/Hecate	soprano	Jessica Beebe
Morbus	tenor	George Ross Somerville
Pestilitas	bass	John David Miles
Giant/Bone Man/Man in the Azure Coat/Man of the Blue House	bass	James Osby Gwathney, Jr.

== Instrumentation ==
- Violin, trumpet, horn, piano, Rhodes piano, percussion.

== Recording ==
- 2020: Elizabeth Braden, conductor; Jessica Beebe, Andrew Bogard, Samantha Hankey, Maeve Hoglund. Tzadik (TZ 4030-2)
