= Rihab Chaieb =

Tunisian-Canadian operatic mezzo-soprano

- Born: Sousse, Tunisia
- Occupation: Mezzo-soprano

Rihab Chaieb is a Tunisian-Canadian mezzo-soprano.

== Early life and education ==
Rihab Chaieb was born in Sousse, Tunisia, and settled in Montreal with her parents when she was 2 years old. Growing up in an Arab household, she was exposed to and developed a deep appreciation for Arabic music from an early age. Her mother and father – a mathematician and an engineer – never played classical music albums in their household but Rihab's passion for this genre flourished in her teenage years through her love for metal music, which led her to pull together a ragtag heavy metal band and start taking voice lessons to help improve her singing. She then decided to pursue a career in singing.

To support her musical aspirations, she took on various jobs, including lifeguarding and performing at clubs along Montreal's vibrant Crescent Street during late-night hours. She secured a place in the esteemed Canadian Opera Company Young Artists Program, where she honed her skills from 2010 to 2013. During this period, Chaieb's career gained momentum as she took on increasingly significant roles. Notably, her portrayal of Sesto in "La clemenza di Tito" garnered critical acclaim.

Chaieb earned a Bachelor of Music in Vocal Performance from the School of Music at McGill University, where she studied with Sanford Sylvan.

== Career ==
Continuing her artistic journey, she became a member of the Metropolitan Opera's Lindemann Young Artist Program. On the grand stage of the Met, Chaieb showcased her versatility in various productions, including notable roles such as Zulma in L'italiana in Algeri, Laura in Luisa Miller, Lola in Cavalleria rusticana and Sandmännchen in Hänsel und Gretel. She returned to the Met in 2019 as a guest artist, singing Zerlina in Don Giovanni conducted by Cornelius Meister.

The following years marked her debut at the Houston Grand Opera in the world premiere of Tarik O'Regan's The Phoenix, the 2019/2020 season opening of the Dutch National Opera in Robert Carsen's Cavalleria rusticana conducted by Lorenzo Viotti, and her performances as Fantasio in Offenbach's opéra comique at Opéra de Montpellier, Dorabella in Così fan tutte at Teatro Santiago de Chile, Kasturbai in Philip Glass' Satyagraha at Opera Ballet Vlaanderen. She received unanimous acclaime for her first Carmen in Lydia Steier's intense new production for Cologne Opera in 2020. Additionally, she worked with esteemed conductor Yannick Nézet-Séguin and the Orchestre Métropolitain, recording both Bach's Mass in B minor and Beethoven's Symphony No. 9, which was released on Deutsche Grammophon's DG Stage.

In the 2021/2022 season she made her debut as Charlotte in a concert performance of Werther at Opera Vlaanderen under conductor Giedrė Šlekytė, portrayed the role of Rosina in Il barbiere di Siviglia at Cincinnati Opera, sang for the first time at the Washington National Opera as Dorabella and at Palm Beach Opera in the title role of Carmen. She debuted the role of Penelope in Il ritorno d'Ulisse in patria on tour and for a recording with Ensemble I Gemelli. Furthermore, she returned to Opéra National de Montpellier as Maddalena in Rigoletto and to the Metropolitan Opera as Nefertiti in Akhnaten conducted by Karen Kamensek and directed by Phelim McDermott.

She made her house debut at the Bavarian State Opera in the following season singing as Fenena in Nabucco under the direction of Daniele Rustioni. She had her first appearance at the Los Angeles Opera, portraying Cherubino in James Gray's production of The Marriage of Figaro conducted by James Conlon. She portrayed Carmen at the Canadian Opera Company and at Calgary Opera and returned to the Grand Théâtre de Genève, where she starred in the world premiere of Jost's Voyage vers l'espoir as La mère Meryem.

Engagements for current and upcoming seasons include: Claire in the world premiere of Melancholia, composed by Mikael Karlsson and written by Royce Vavrek, at the Royal Swedish Opera, Charlotte in Werther conducted once again by Giedrė Šlekytė and staged by Tatjana Gürbaca at Zurich Opera House, Dorabella in Così fan tutte with the Seiji Ozawa Music Academy and Carmen at Glyndebourne Festival. Additionally, she will be making a return to the Metropolitan Opera and the Bavarian State Opera, as well as appearing with companies such as Bregenzer Festspiele, Los Angeles Philharmonic, Gran Teatre del Liceu, Opéra de Montreal, Festival San Sebastián, Canadian Opera Company, Orchestre Symphonique de Québec, Philadelphia Orchestra and the BBC Proms. On the concert platform Chaieb appeared with the Philharmonia Baroque Orchestra in Handel's Messiah, the Vancouver Symphony Orchestra under Otto Tausk for Berlioz's Les Nuits d'été, and debuted the role of Ruggiero in Handel's Alcina with the Manitoba Chamber Orchestra. Chaieb performed in J. S. Bach's Magnificat in her Carnegie Hall debut in December 2016 and in Mahler's Das Lied von der Erde at the 2019 Toronto Summer Music Festival, conducted by Gemma New.

== Awards ==
Chaieb was the Grand Prize winner of the George London Foundation in 2018 and the First Prize winner of the Gerda Lissner International Vocal Competition in 2016. Additionally, she achieved Second Prize in the Opera Index Voice Competition in 2016 and won the Grand Prize in the Christina & Louis Quilico Award Competition in 2013. Chaieb is a laureate of the Jeunes Ambassadeurs Lyriques du Canada and was honored with the 2014 Bernard-Diamant Prize by the Canada Arts Council, which acknowledges outstanding young musicians in their annual competition for grants to professional musicians.

== Personal life ==
Chaieb is fluent in both English and French.

== Opera roles ==
- Carmen, Carmen (Bizet)
- Charlotte, Werther (Massenet)
- Claire, Melancholia (Karlsson)
- Cherubino, Le nozze di Figaro (Mozart)
- Dorabella, Così fan tutte (Mozart)
- Fairy Prince, The Wake Wold (Hertzberg)
- Fantasio, Fantasio (Offenbach)
- Fenena, Nabucco (Verdi)
- Kasturbai, Satyagraha (Glass)
- Lola, Cavalleria Rusticana (Mascagni)
- Maddalena, Rigoletto (Verdi)
- Meryem, Voyage vers l'espoir (Jost)
- Nefertiti, Akhenaten (Glass)
- Penelope, Il ritorno di Ulisse in patria (Monteverdi)
- Rosina, Il barbiere di Siviglia (Rossini)
- Sesto, La clemenza di Tito (Mozart)
- Waltraute, Die Walkyrie (Wagner)
- Zerlina, Don Giovanni (Mozart)

== Recordings ==
- Tarik O'Regan: The Phoenix at Houston Grand Opera, Pentatone, 2020 [CD]
- Mascagni: Cavalleria rusticana at Dutch National Opera, Naxos 2021[DVD]
- Verdi: Rigoletto at Opéra national de Montpellier, La Maison de la Lirique, 2022 [DVD]
- The Great Puccini – Jonathan Tetelman, Deutsche Grammophon, 2023 [CD]
- Monteverdi: Il ritorno di Ulisse in patria, Gemelli Factory, 2023 [CD]
