= Bill Fontana =

American sound artist

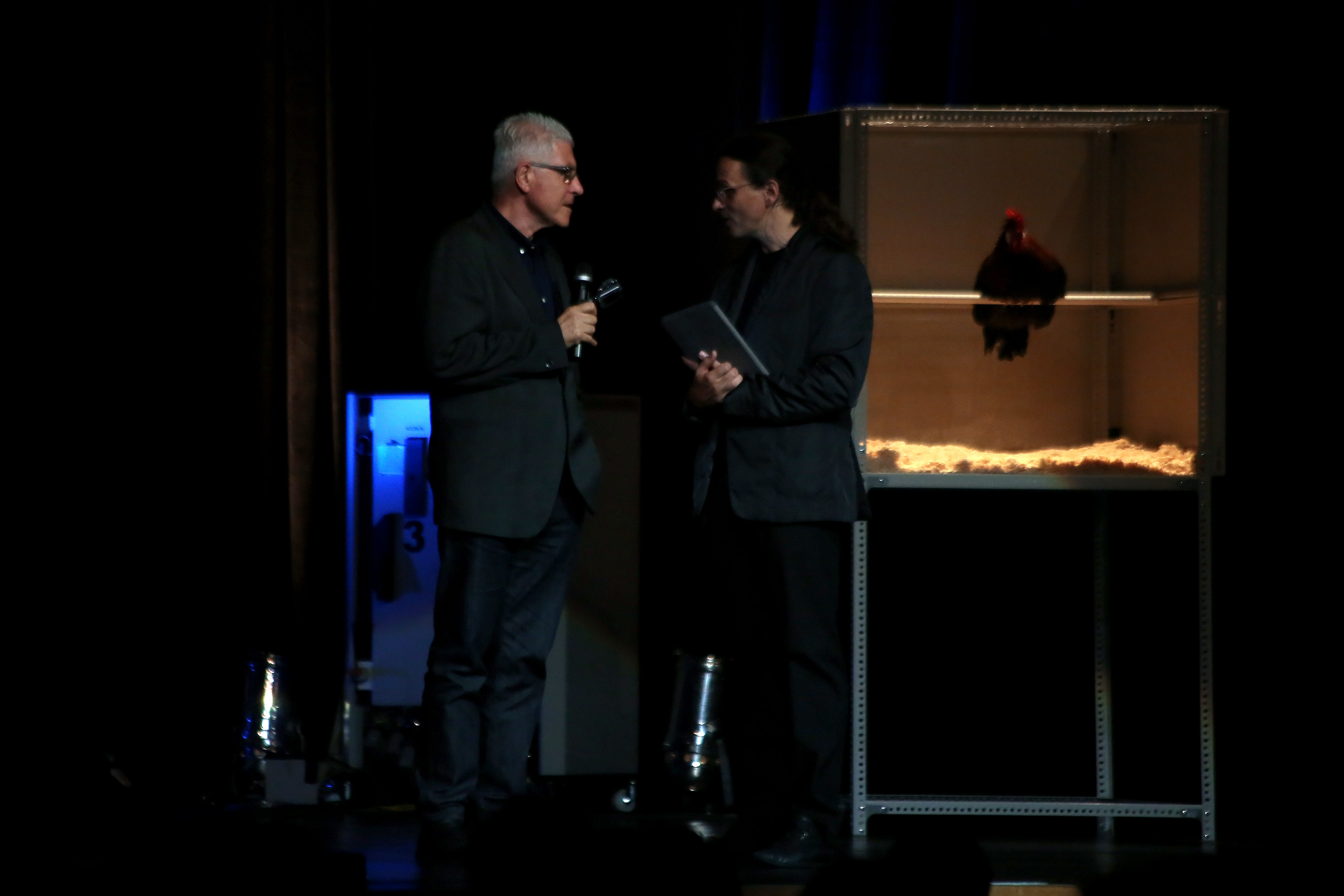
- Fontana (left) at Ars Electronica 2013
- Born: April 25, 1947 (age 78); Cleveland, Ohio, U.S.
- Occupation: American composer

Bill Fontana (born April 25, 1947 in Cleveland, Ohio) is known internationally for his pioneering experiments in sound art.

== Life and career ==
Fontana attended the New School for Social Research in New York and studied both music and philosophy. He traveled to Australia, and also stayed in Japan and Germany composing. Fontana began making sound sculptures in 1976. In a career spanning 40 years, Fontana's sound sculptures use the urban environment as a living source of musical information, all with the potential to conjure up visual imagery in the mind of the listener. He has made works all over the world and has presented his sound sculptures extensively, including at the Venice Biennale (1999), the Museo Reina Sofia, Madrid (1995), The Whitney Museum of American Art, New York (1991), Tate Modern, London (2006), Madison Square Park, New York (2007), and the San Francisco Museum of Modern Art (1987, 1997, 2010). Some of his more famous works include Distant Trains, Satellite Ear Bridge Cologne-San Francisco, Journey Through My Sound Sculptures, The Sound of an Unblown Flute, Panoramic Echoes and "Acoustical Visions of the Golden Gate Bridge" In 2005, Fontana was an Artadia Awardee. Fontana recently won the Prix Ars Electronica Collide@CERN Prize, 2012–2013 where is developing a sound sculpture at CERN in Geneva called "Acoustic Time Travel" to be realized in September 2014 for the 60th Anniversary of CERN.
