= Music Critics Association of North America Award for Best New Opera =

American music award

The Music Critics Association of North America gives an Award for Best New Opera annually to given to a composer and librettist.

In giving the inaugural award in 2017, the association stated that the prize "which recognizes musical and theatrical excellence, will be given annually to a fully staged work that received its world premiere in North America during the preceding calendar year."

== Recipients ==
Year	Opera	Composer and librettist	Finalists	Ref.
2017	Breaking the Waves	Missy Mazzoli and Royce Vavrek	Anatomy Theater – David Lang and Mark Dion; Fellow Travelers – Gregory Spears and Greg Pierce	
2018	The Wake World	David Hertzberg	Dinner at Eight – William Bolcom and Mark Campbell; The (R)evolution of Steve Jobs – Mason Bates and Mark Campbell; War of the Worlds – Annie Gosfield and Yuval Sharon	
2019	prism	Ellen Reid and Roxie Perkins	An American Soldier – Huang Ruo and David Henry Hwang; Proving Up – Missy Mazzoli and Royce Vavrek	
2020	Blue	Jeanine Tesori and Tazewell Thompson	Fire Shut Up in My Bones – Terence Blanchard and Kasi Lemmons; prisoner of the state – David Lang	
2021	Sweet Land	Du Yun, Raven Chacon, Douglas Kearney, Aja Couchois Duncan	Eurydice – Matthew Aucoin and Sarah Ruhl	
2023	R.U.R. A Torrent of Light	Nicole Lizée and Nicolas Billon	n/a	
