= David Hertzberg =

American composer

David Hertzberg (born January 14, 1990) is an American composer of chamber, orchestral, and operatic music. He has received significant critical attention for his two site-specific operas, The Wake World and The Rose Elf, for which he wrote both music and libretto.

== Early life and education (1990–2015) ==
Hertzberg was born in Los Angeles, where he studied music at the Colburn School, before attending the Walnut Hill School for the Arts in Natick, Massachusetts. In 2008, he attended the Darmstädter Ferienkurse in Darmstadt, Germany. He received Bachelor and Masters of Music degrees from The Juilliard School in 2012 and 2013, respectively. There he studied composition with Samuel Adler. In 2015 he received an Artist Diploma from the Curtis Institute of Music.

In 2011, while a student at Juilliard, his cantata Nympharum was premiered by soprano Jennifer Zetlan and the Juilliard Orchestra, conducted by Jeffrey Milarsky, at Alice Tully Hall. In 2013, the New Juilliard Ensemble premiered his sinfonietta femminina, oscura, also at Alice Tully Hall.

== Career (2015-present) ==
In 2015, Hertzberg's chamber work Orgie-Céleste was premiered at Merkin Hall in New York, as part of his tenure as Composer-in-Residence at Young Concert Artists. In 2016, his cantata Sunday Morning, originally commissioned through Gotham Chamber Opera, was premiered at Lincoln Center by New York City Opera. In 2014, 2015, 2016, and 2019, he had chamber works premiered on the Concert Artist Guild recital series at Carnegie Hall. In the spring of 2017, the American Composers Orchestra premiered his Chamber Symphony at Carnegie Hall.

From 2015 to 2018, he served as Composer-in-Residence for Opera Philadelphia. In September 2017, the company premiered his opera The Wake World, based on the eponymous story by Aleister Crowley, to wide critical acclaim. The opera was staged at the Barnes Foundation, and featured an often wordless chamber choir. Hertzberg was subsequently nominated for Newcomer of the Year at the International Opera Awards. The Wake World went on to win the Music Critics Association of North America Award for Best New Opera.

In June 2018, his chamber opera The Rose Elf, based on the fairy tale of the same name by Hans Christian Andersen, premiered in the catacombs of Green-Wood Cemetery in Brooklyn. Discussing the unusual venue and presentation of the opera in The New York Observer, James Jorden wrote, "If on paper the event threatened a level of bizarrerie sufficient to daunt Taylor Mac, in real time this presentation... turned out to be just about everything you want opera to be. The Rose Elf shocked, confounded, disturbed, and, in the end, exalted." Following the premiere, WQXR cited The Rose Elf as the "Opera Event of the Half Year". The Rose Elf was later named among "New York's Most Memorable Concerts of 2018" and given Operavore's annual "Freddie" Award for Best New Opera.

On April 24, 2020, a studio recording of The Wake World was released on Tzadik Records. The New York Times listed a track from the album among the 25 Best Classical Music Tracks of 2020. On October 31, 2020, an album of The Rose Elf was released by Swan Studios. Opera News named it as one of the 5 Best New Works of 2021. In January 2022, Pittsburgh Opera presented a new production of The Rose Elf.

In January 2023, The Washington Post listed him among their "Composers and Performers to Watch". That spring, he served as Musician in Residence for Dumbarton Oaks in Washington, D.C.

He has been a resident at MacDowell in 2019, and Yaddo in 2013, 2015, 2017, and 2024.

== Critical reception ==
Hertzberg has received critical attention for his musical language, which critics have cited for its decadence and compared to various fin-de-siècle and modernist composers and artists, as well as those of the pre-and-post-war avant-garde.

Writing in The Philadelphia Inquirer, Peter Dobrin described Hertzberg's saxophone quartet murmurations as "strikingly original", noting that the work's harmonic language "grows out of non-serial Berg and Schoenberg but, in the ghostly way it revealed itself, resembled little else.".

Discussing Hertzberg's chamber work Orgie-Céleste in The New York Times, Anthony Tommasini wrote of "a vibrantly personal style", denoting echoes of 20th century composers Olivier Messiaen, Arnold Schoenberg, and Morton Feldman, though describing the sound and cadence of the work as "utterly original".

Reviewing Hertzberg's cantata Sunday Morning in The New York Times, Zachary Woolfe commented on the work's delicacy, comparing it to the paintings of Robert Ryman and describing music that "begins with sunrise ethereality...and remains raptly restrained even as it condenses and blooms."

Writing in The Wall Street Journal, Heidi Waleson described the music in Hertzberg's opera The Wake World as having "the sheen and muscle of Strauss wedded to the diaphanous spirit of Debussy, but with a distinctly modern edge". Covering the same work in The New York Times, Anthony Tommasini noted, "The score, spiked with modernist elements, makes Mr. Hertzberg seem like a 21st century Ravel."

Discussing the 2020 recording of The Wake World in Opera, John Rockwell wrote, "Hertzberg's poetic text is positively lurid; it makes Wilde's Salome sound downright prosaic." Rockwell continues to identify numerous references he perceives in the music and libretto, including Daphnis et Chloé, Pelléas et Mélisande, Salome and Die Frau Ohne Schatten, the Flowermaidens and the Rhinemaidens, Lulu, Bluebeard's Castle, Alice in Wonderland and Orlando, before concluding "Yet for all of that, Hertzberg's opera sounds completely original."

Hertzberg has cited Richard Wagner and Kabbalah as influences on his music.

== Awards ==
- Guggenheim Fellowship (2020)
- American Academy of Arts and Letters Andrew Imbrie Award (2020)
- Music Critics Association of North America Award for Best New Opera (2018)
