= Ellen Reid (composer) =

American composer (born 1983)

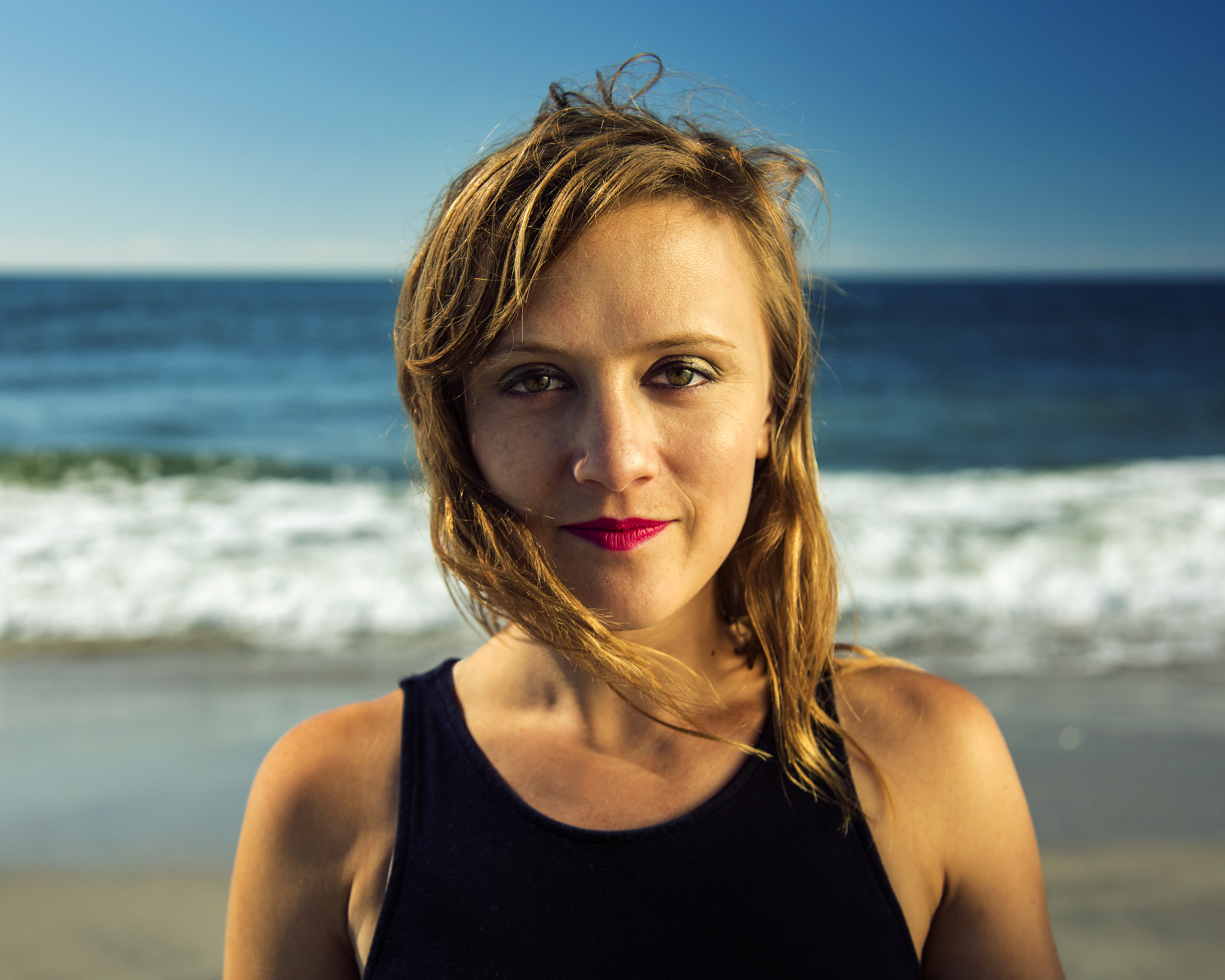
Reid in 2016

Ellen Reid (born 1983) is an American composer originally from Oak Ridge, Tennessee who lives and works in New York City and Los Angeles. Reid is a multi-genre composer whose work spans classical, opera, sound installations, film scores, avant-pop, ensemble and choral writing. She is known for her Pulitzer Prize-winning opera, p r i s m, Ellen Reid SOUNDWALK and her work with various orchestras, including the album isomonstrosity.

== Early life ==
Reid grew up in Oak Ridge, Tennessee. Her first musical experiences were singing in church choir, playing in the school band, and piano lessons. She started writing music during her time at Columbia College of Columbia University, writing incidental music for plays and scoring films. Her inspiration began with the sounds of her environment. After college, she lived in Thailand for two and a half years, working and learning alongside Thai musicians writing operatic works that draw from both Western and Thai traditions.

== Career ==
=== Classical ===
Reid's work has been performed by the New York Philharmonic, Boston Symphony Orchestra, Los Angeles Philharmonic, RTÉ, American Composers Orchestra, Los Angeles Chamber Orchestra, the National Symphony Orchestra of Ireland, and other institutions around the world.

Reid is the first person to have been commissioned by and have world premieres by all four of Los Angeles's major classical music institutions—the Los Angeles Opera, Los Angeles Philharmonic, Los Angeles Master Chorale and Los Angeles Chamber Orchestra—and the only female composer to have been performed by all four.

Since 2019, Reid has served as Creative Advisor and Composer-in-Residence for L.A. Chamber Orchestra. She presently serves as the Contemporary Music Chair. She is the first composer to be in residence with both Amsterdam's Royal Concertgebouw Concert Hall and Concertgebouw Orchestra simultaneously.

=== p r i s m ===
In November 2018, Reid began composing her first opera, p r i s m, about a sexual assault survivor's psychological struggles. It premiered in Los Angeles and was awarded the 2019 Pulitzer Prize for Music. It also received the Music Critics Association of North America Award for Best New Opera. Reid received Lincoln Center's Emerging Artist Award and has been one of Musical America's 30 Professionals of the Year.

=== Ellen Reid SOUNDWALK ===
In 2020, Reid created Ellen Reid SOUNDWALK, a GPS-enabled work of public art that uses music to illuminate the natural environment by reimagining urban parks as interactive soundscapes. SOUNDWALK premiered in New York City's Central Park, featuring the New York Philharmonic, and has been installed in parks around the world, including Los Angeles's Griffith Park (presented by CAP UCLA), London's Regent's Park & Primrose Hill presented by Wellcome Collection, and Tokyo's Ueno Park (presented by Spring Festival). A SOUNDWALK album features Reid's music and collaborators such as the Kronos Quartet, Philadelphia Orchestra, Shabaka Hutchings, and Nadia Sirota.

=== Film ===
Reid is known for her crackling, lyrical film scores and has worked with A24, Amazon Studios, and Duplass Brothers Productions. Her first feature film score was for the 2014 drama-mystery The Midnight Swim. She also contributed original music to the soundtrack of the 2016 mystery film Buster's Mal Heart and scored Birds of Paradise, a 2021 film produced by Amazon Studios. All these films were written and directed by Sarah Adina Smith.

Reid's work has been featured at film festivals including SXSW, IFC Center, Outfest, TriBeCa Film Festival, and the Toronto International Film Festival. Her concert work was also the inspiration for artist Alex Prager's short film Run!

=== isomonstrosity ===
In 2022, Reid released the album isomonstrosity, an avant-pop collaboration with artists Johan Lenox and Yuga Cohlerl. Bringing both classical and synth-based compositions to the project, the vocal chamber music album uses the modern production techniques and aesthetics of hip-hop, assembling contributions from a wide array of artists.

isomonstrosity features collaborations with 645AR, Kacy Hill, Vic Mensa, Danny Brown, and Empress Of, among others. It was released on November 18, 2022.

=== Luna Composition Lab ===
Reid co-founded Luna Composition Lab in 2016 with Missy Mazzoli. The organization provides mentorship, education, and resources for young female, non-binary, and gender-nonconforming composers ages 13–18. It is the only program of its kind in the United States.

== Education ==
Reid graduated from Oak Ridge High School in Oak Ridge, Tennessee. She then graduated from Columbia College of Columbia University in 2005 and earned her MFA at California Institute of the Arts; her teachers included Anne LeBaron, David Rosenboom, and George Lewis.
