= Ellen Elizabeth Reed =

British code-breaker (1916–2020)

Ellen Elizabeth Reed (1916 – 30 August 2020) was a code-breaker at Bletchley Park during the Second World War.

== Biography ==
Ellen Elizabeth Langstaff was born in Canada but was brought up in the United Kingdom. She got a degree in French and German from Cambridge University.

Reed started working at Bletchley Park in Milton Keynes in 1939 when she was 23 years old. She was one of only 400 people at Bletchley Park when she joined. She was promoted to personal assistant to group Captain Eric Jones after performing roles that were previously performed exclusively by men.

Reed translated decrypted German messages into English and oversaw 600 workers as a personnel officer.

She served as the secretary of the Bletchley Park Recreational Club Drama Group and also acted in several plays.

Reed did not know about Alan Turing until Fred Winterbotham's book about Bletchley Park came out in 1975.

She married Nigel Reed of New Zealand in 1945, who became Chief Justice of Northern Nigeria and was knighted. The couple lived in Nigeria.

Reed and her husband lived partly in the UK and partly in New Zealand from 1975 till 1995 and lived full-time in Northland after 1995. Sir Nigel Reed died in 1997.

She had three children. Reed died in Paihia on 30 August 2020. She was 104 years old.
