= Brooklyn Center for the Performing Arts =

Brooklyn Center for the Performing Arts was an independent 501(c)(3) nonprofit performing arts organization located on the campus of Brooklyn College, founded in 1954. The Brooklyn Center presented multiple disciplinary arts performances and coordinated one of the largest arts education programs in the borough, serving 46,000 schoolchildren from over 300 schools annually.

In July 2018, the organization relieved its nonprofit status by becoming a unit of Brooklyn College's School of Visual, Media, and Performing Arts under the name Brooklyn Center for the Performing Arts at Brooklyn College (BCBC), or Brooklyn College Presents.

On September 6, 2018 (63 days after becoming part of Brooklyn College), the college closed the organization, citing budgetary reasons.

== Mission ==
Brooklyn Center's mission is to present outstanding performing arts and arts education programs reflective of Brooklyn's diverse communities at affordable prices. A central part of the mission is to introduce young people to the performing arts, enhance education, and expose children to new ideas and other cultures.

== History ==
The rights to the site of Brooklyn College, initially occupied by Native Americans, were transferred to Dutch settlers in 1636 in exchange for one hundred guilders, two-and-one-half tons of beer, three long-barreled guns, and some ammunition. For the next three centuries, homesteaders and farmers occupied the land. In 1924, Ringling Brothers, Barnum, and Bailey Circus began to use the grounds for their annual visits to Brooklyn. By 1935, the college secured the property, and in October of that year, construction of Brooklyn College began.

Since the college served a large, urban, and unusually heterogeneous student body, it became evident that the campus needed a grand assembly hall. During World War II, Brooklyn College's President Harry D. Gideonse wrote a proposal to the City Planning Commission for auditorium funding. The building would contain two performance spaces: George Gershwin Theater, nicknamed the “little theater” and the Walt Whitman Theatre. The property's landscaping followed construction, and by April 15, 1953, the cornerstone was ceremoniously placed in position.

Brooklyn Center for the Performing Arts at Brooklyn College (BCBC) is part of a long tradition of cultural excellence associated with Brooklyn. Since several artists have roots in Brooklyn, its three main halls are named after famous Brooklynites: George Gershwin, Sam Levenson, and Walt Whitman.

== Programming ==
Brooklyn Center's annual programs include a World Stages Music and Dance series, Headliners, Theatre, Arts in the Afternoon, Special Events, Target Family Fun, and SchoolTimes Series. Over the years, Brooklyn Center has presented more than 150 New York, U.S., and world premieres. Among the performers to grace the stage of the Walt Whitman Theatre are Luciano Pavarotti, Isaac Stern, Gregory Hines, Margot Fonteyn, Beverly Sills, Ray Charles, Joan Sutherland, Tony Bennett, Les Ballets Africains, Isaac Hayes, Vladimir Horowitz, André Watts, The Temptations, Arthur Rubinstein, the National Dance Theatre Company of Jamaica, José Greco, the Moiseyev Dance Company, Suzanne Farrell, Peter Martins, and Itzhak Perlman.

=== Arts education ===
Brooklyn Center offers lower ticket prices to its family performances with the Target Family Fun series. Now in its 25th season, the series is designed to provide parents and caregivers with the opportunity to introduce their children to music, theater, and dance at affordable prices. In 2009 Brooklyn Center was selected as Best Theatre or Theatre Group for Kids in Brooklyn as part of Nickelodeon's ParentsConnect Annual Pick Awards.

Brooklyn Center's SchoolTime series was created more than 30 years ago to fill the gap created by cuts in public school arts programs, particularly in disadvantaged neighborhoods. The series of performances, which take place during the school day, introduce and expose young students ages 4–14 to educational performing arts programs. More than 46,000 students come to Brooklyn Center each year for SchoolTime performances.
