= Sheketak =

The Sheketak Group was created by duo Danny Rahum and Tzahi Patish in 1997. The Group's productions combine contemporary dance, lively music, video, and theater. The group performed in Israel and in 30 other countries.

The origin of the group's name is the blending of two words in Hebrew: sheket (silence), and tak (the creation of sound). The word "sheketak" is widely used by the group's artists to express rhythmic and musical phrases during a work process.

Sheketak won the Culture and Education Ministry's 2001 Young Creators Prize.

Sheketak partook in various television and theatrical productions, such as "King Solomon and Shlomi the Shoemaker" at Habima Theater, and TV shows such as Kokhav Nolad, Nolad Lirkod, and Yair Lapid and Dudu Topaz's talk shows.

Sheketak's directors created several soundtracks and choreography for many television productions and commercials.

== Selected works ==
- Elements
- Beats in Movement
- From Street Kids to Street Performers
- The Nutcracker
