= Wang Lu (composer) =

Chinese composer (born 1982)

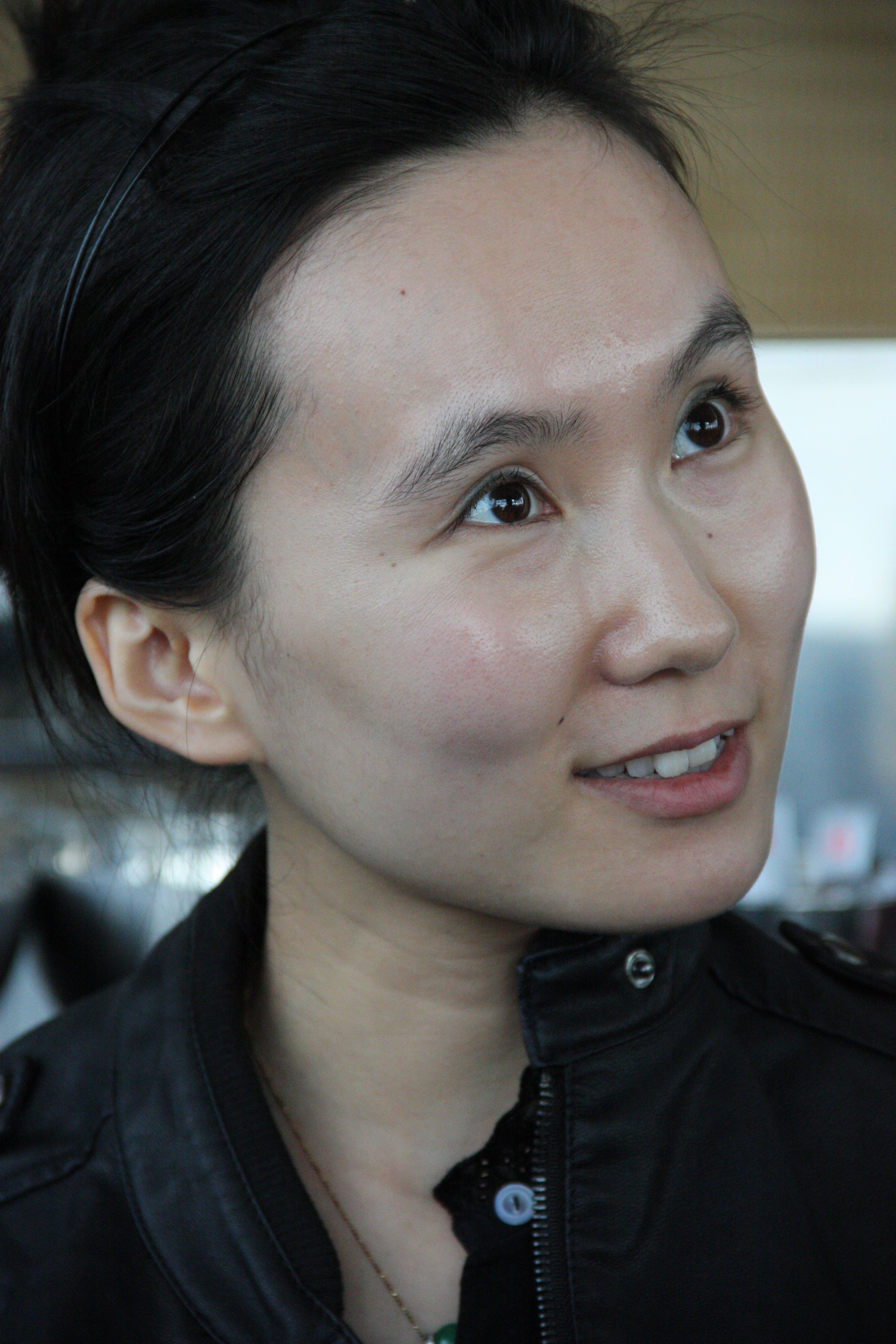
- At Gaudeamus Muziekweek in 2010
- Born: 1982 (age 43–44); Xi'an, China
- Occupation: Composer
- Spouse: Anthony Cheung
- Awards: Guggenheim Fellowship (2014)

Academic background
- Education: Central Conservatory of Music; Columbia Graduate School of Arts and Sciences
- Thesis: Flowing Waters and the Flow of Time: Guan Pinghu's Interpretation of Flowing Waters (2012)
- Doctoral advisor: Fred Lerdahl
- Musical career
- Genres: Chamber music; electroacoustic music

Wang Lu (born 1982) is a Chinese composer. She is a 2014 Guggenheim Fellow and has released two solo albums. She is an assistant professor of music at Brown University.

== Biography ==
Wang Lu was born in 1982 in Xi'an. Her family was experienced in music, with her father involved in Beijing opera. Originally interested in singing, she later switched to playing piano. She studied at the Central Conservatory of Music, obtaining an undergraduate degree there, before obtaining her DMA from Columbia Graduate School of Arts and Sciences in 2012. Her doctoral dissertation Flowing Waters and the Flow of Time: Guan Pinghu's Interpretation of Flowing Waters was supervised by Fred Lerdahl. She studied composition with Lerdahl, Chou Wen-chung, George E. Lewis, and Tristan Murail.

In 2010, Wang was the first-place winner at the Nouvel Ensemble Moderne Young Composers Forum. In 2014, she was awarded a Guggenheim Fellowship. In 2015, she started working at Brown University as an assistant professor of music, teaching courses in music theory and composition. She released two solo albums through New Focus Recordings: Urban Inventory (2018) and An Atlas of Time (2020).

In October 2019, her piece Code Switch premiered during the opening night of the 22nd season of Chicago Symphony Orchestra's MusicNOW. In January 2021, Michael Andor Brodeur named her in his 21 for '21 series for The Washington Post, calling her second album "one of my favorite albums of the weird, weird year". In 2022, she was awarded a MacDowell Fellowship. In January 2023, the New York Philharmonic premiered her piece "Surge"; Joshua Barone of the New York Times said it "has the elements of an enormous score skillfully accordioned into the shape of a much smaller one."

Wang's husband, Anthony Cheung, is also a composer. The couple lived in Chicago in the mid-2010s and had a child in the late 2010s.
