= Music Critics Association of North America =

Society of music critics (founded in 1956)

- Formation: 1956; 69 years ago
- Purpose: Promote and encourage music criticism
- Headquarters: Glyndon, Maryland
- Website: mcana.org

The Music Critics Association of North America (MCANA) is a society for music critics of classical music in the United States and Canada. Founded in 1956, the MCANA is a member of the National Music Council and both publishes an annual newsletter and confers a Best New Opera award.

Numerous chief music critics have been associated with it; past presidents include Robert Commanday, Miles Kastendieck, Irving Lowens and Donald Rosenberg, while critics elected to lifetime memberships include Paul Hume, Paul Henry Lang, Harold C. Schonberg and Virgil Thomson.

== Overview ==
The Music Critics Association of North America (MCANA) was founded in 1956. It stemmed from discussion during a 1952 League of American Orchestras symposium between music critics and conductors. Its early history began with workshops sponsored by numerous organizations: League of American Orchestras, the New York Music Critics Circle, New York PO and the Rockefeller Foundation. According to the musicologist Rita H. Mead, "it has sponsored annual courses for younger professionals and senior critics in an effort to promote high standards of music criticism, encourage educational opportunities and increase general interest in music".

The MCANA is the only North American organization devoted to classical music criticism. Critics associated in the MCANA's early history included Paul Hume, Miles Kastendieck, Irving Lowens and Harold C. Schonberg. Critics Hume, Paul Henry Lang, Schonberg and Virgil Thomson were given lifetime memberships. The organization's presidents have included Robert Commanday, Kastendieck, Lowens and Donald Rosenberg. Its membership—which consists of not only critics, but also program annotators and radio producers—includes writers at The Baltimore Sun, the Chicago Tribune, The Cincinnati Enquirer, The Dallas Morning News, Musical America, NewMusicBox, The New York Times, The Plain Dealer, San Francisco Chronicle and The Wall Street Journal.

It produces an annual newsletter and an award for Best New Opera. In 2013, it launched its online journal Classical Voice North America.
