= Max Cooper =

Max Cooper may refer to:

- Max Cooper (music producer) (born 1980), European electronica and techno musician
- Max Cooper (soccer) (born 2007), Australian soccer defender
- Max Dale Cooper (born 1933), American immunologist
- Maximillion Cooper (born 1972), founder of the Gumball 3000 brand
- Max Cooper (Wild Force Power Rangers), a protagonist in the television series Power Rangers Wild Force
