= Xenia Pestova Bennett =

- Pestova Bennett performing in 2026

Background information
- Born: Xenia Pestova
- Origin: New Zealand
- Occupations: Musician; composer
- Instruments: Piano, keyboards
- Years active: 2005–present
- Labels: Diatribe Records, Naxos, NMC Recordings
- Website: xeniapestovabennett.com

Xenia Pestova Bennett is a New Zealand pianist and composer who is best known for her contemporary keyboard repertoire.

== Education and career ==
Pestova Bennett studied piano and composition in New Zealand, the UK, Canada. She received a PhD in piano performance from McGill University.

Since graduating from university she has received prizes at numerous piano competitions, including the 2003 Messiaen International Piano Competition, the KeriKeri Piano Competition of New Zealand and first prize Xavier Montsalvatge International Piano Competition.

Pestova Bennett been a featured artist at various concert halls including appearances at the Sounthbank Centre, National Concert Hall in Dublin, Glasgow Royal Concert Hall, Philharmonie Luxembourg and the RTÉ Concert Orchestra. She has also held residencies at experimental music venues such as Cafe Oto.

Pestova Bennett is well known for premiering new music on the Magnetic Resonator Piano, an instrument made by engineer and composer Andrew McPherson.

She released her solo record Atomic Legacies on Diatribe Records.
