= Complications in Sue =

2026 opera by ten composers

- Opera by Andy Akiho, Alistair Coleman, Nathalie Joachim, Missy Mazzoli, Nico Muhly, Rene Orth, Cécile McLorin Salvant, Kamala Sankaram, Dan Schlosberg, and Errollyn Wallen
- Librettist: Michael R. Jackson
- Language: English
- Premiere: February 4, 2026; Academy of Music, Philadelphia

Complications in Sue is an English-language opera to a libretto by Michael R. Jackson. Based on an idea by Justin Vivian Bond, it is composed of ten scenes, each by a different composer: Andy Akiho, Alistair Coleman, Nathalie Joachim, Missy Mazzoli, Nico Muhly, Rene Orth, Cécile McLorin Salvant, Kamala Sankaram, Dan Schlosberg, and Errollyn Wallen. The opera was commissioned by Opera Philadelphia and premiered in 2026 at the Academy of Music, Philadelphia, with Bond in the title role of Sue.

== Background and performance history ==
Justin Vivian Bond had the idea for Complications in Sue in response to a suggestion by actor Tilda Swinton that they do a project together. In the project, both Bond and Swinton would play the title character, a woman named Sue. Rather than materializing, the project became "a running joke", until Anthony Roth Costanzo, a friend of Bond's and general director of Opera Philadelphia commissioned the project in 2024 for the company's 50th anniversary season, 2025–26, bringing on Michael R. Jackson as librettist.

Because of a short deadline of only six to eight months, Costanzo and Jackson decided to bring on multiple composers. Jackson structured the work into 10 scenes, each covering a decade of Sue's life, and each about eight minutes long. Each was set to music by a different composer, and, inspired by the surrealist exquisite corpse technique, each composer was given the libretto only for their scene and only a summary of the rest of the libretto, without knowledge of what the other composers were doing, though they could communicate with the creative team and singers. Several composers were selected for their existing ties to Opera Philadelphia, including Missy Mazzoli, Rene Orth, and Nathalie Joachim. Some of the composers are well established in opera, while others are early in their career or new to opera, such as the jazz singer Cécile McLorin Salvant.

The opera had a workshop presentation in January 2026 in New York with Works & Process.

The opera premiered at the Academy of Music in Philadelphia on February 4, 2026, conducted by Caren Levine and directed by Raja Feather Kelly and Zack Winokur. In addition to Bond in the largely silent role of Sue, it featured soprano Kiera Duffy, tenor Nicky Spence, bass-baritone Nicholas Newton and mezzo-soprano Rehanna Thelwell, each singing multiple roles. JW Anderson designed costumes for Bond.

== Plot ==
Each scene deals with a decade in Sue's life.

Scene	Composer	Sue's Age	Summary
1	Errollyn Wallen	0	Death greets the newborn Sue in a hospital nursery.
2	Missy Mazzoli	10	Santa Claus, worried that he is irrelevant and being replaced by Amazon and AI, is told by Mrs. Claus to believe in Sue, because Sue believes in him.
3	Andy Akiho	20s	Two college Co-Eds gossip about another student, Sue.
4	Nathalie Joachim	30s	A Newscaster reports on Sue's dreams and on Sue's doubts about her relationship with Roger.
5	Dan Scholsberg	40s	Roger, now Sue's ex, leaves Sue a voicemail.
6	Cécile McLorin Salvant	50s	The Algorithmic Trio, frustrated that Sue is not clicking and using her phone enough, accosts Sue.
7	Alastair Coleman	60s	Sue's Neighbor confides to her in a phone call.
8	Kamala Sankaram	70s	Sue's Child Self observes Sue in her 70s.
9	Rene Orth	80s	In a nursing home, two other Octogenarians fear death, while Sue waits.
10	Nico Muhly	99	On Sue's 99th birthday, Death returns.

== Reception ==
The Philadelphia Inquirer classical music critic David Patrick Stearns wrote, in a positive review, that "tunes weren't a priority as the composers characterized the theatrical events that Jackson gave them." He describes the singers as giving "it their all in deeply unconventional musico-dramatic assignments." The Wall Street Journal said that it is, "fresh, contemporary and thoroughly engaging."

The online magazine Bachtrack described the premiere as a "sleek physical" production, writing that "Jackson's dramaturgy blossomed in a heightened sense of realism tinged with tongue-in-cheek absurdism. The music often met the mood splendidly."
