= Michael R. Jackson =

American playwright, lyricist and composer

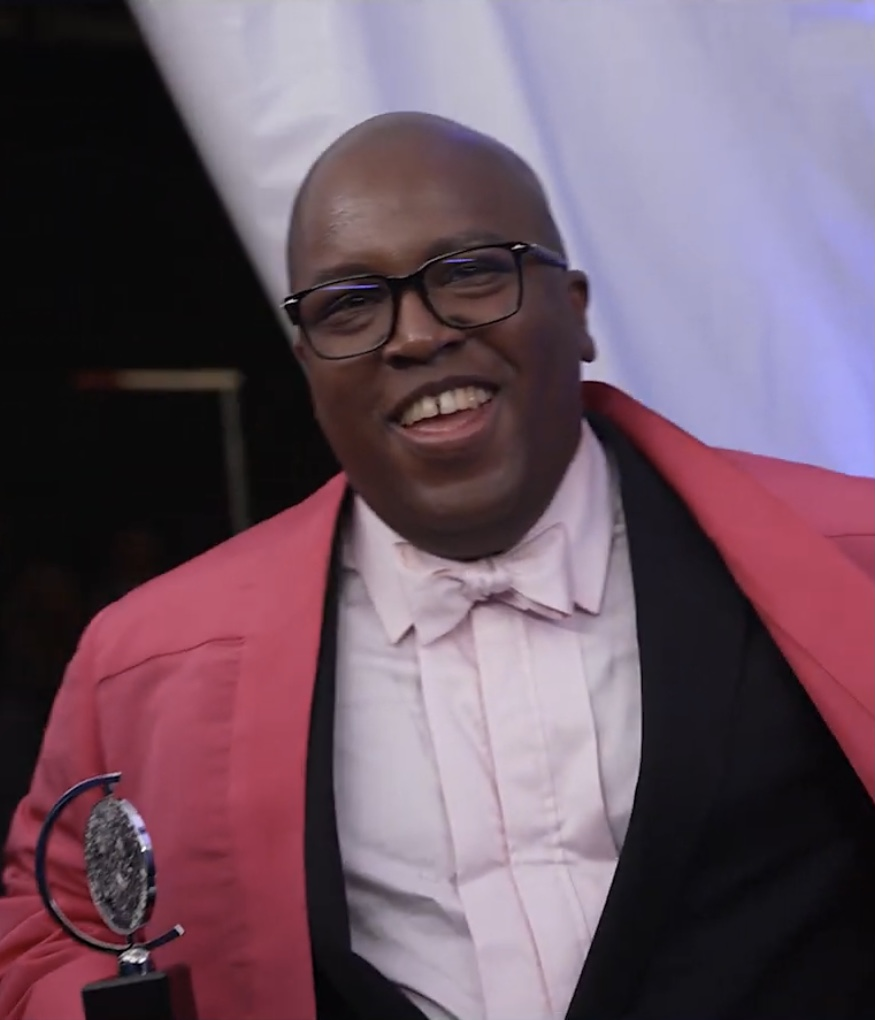
- Jackson at the 75th Tony Awards in 2022
- Born: 1981 (age 44–45); Detroit, Michigan
- Education: New York University (BFA, MFA)
- Occupations: Playwright, composer, and lyricist

Michael R. Jackson (born 1981) is an American playwright, composer, and lyricist, best known for his musical A Strange Loop, which won the 2020 Pulitzer Prize for Drama and the 2022 Tony Award for Best Musical. He is originally from Detroit.

== Career ==
Jackson interned for a time at ABC, working on daytime programming, specifically All My Children. Jackson has described himself as "a huge soap person," and wanted to originally write for soaps.

Jackson wrote the book and lyrics for Only Children with composer Rachel Peters, which was presented at NYU's Frederick Loewe Theatre.

He also wrote lyrics and co-wrote the book, with Anna K. Jacobs, for the musical adaptation of the 2007 indie film Teeth. He sang "Lonesome of the Road" on a tribute album for Elizabeth Swados.

In 2019, his song cycle, The Kids on the Lawn, was published in The New York Times Magazine's culture issue. The issue, organized around the theme "America 2024", imagines what America will be like five years into the future.

Jackson's musical, A Strange Loop, received its world premiere at Playwrights Horizons in New York City in 2019. After a six-week run at the Woolly Mammoth Theatre Company in Washington, D.C., in 2021, A Strange Loop opened on Broadway at the Lyceum Theatre in April 2022.

His musical White Girl in Danger began previews at the Tony Kiser Theater on March 15, 2023, and opened on April 10, 2023. The musical explores the intersections of race, class, and identity in daytime soap operas.

Jackson wrote the libretto for the 2026 opera, Complications in Sue, from an idea by Justin Vivian Bond for Opera Philadelphia. Jackson's libretto is in ten scenes, each set to music by a different composer.

== Major works ==
Year	Title	Music	Lyrics	Book
2019	A Strange Loop	Michael R. Jackson		
2023	White Girl in Danger	Michael R. Jackson		
2024	Teeth	Anna K. Jacobs	Michael R. Jackson	Anna K. Jacobs & Michael R. Jackson
2024	Complications in Sue	Andy Akiho, Alistair Coleman, Nathalie Joachim, Missy Mazzoli, Nico Muhly, Rene Orth, Cécile McLorin Salvant, Kamala Sankaram, Dan Schlosberg, Errollyn Wallen	Michael R. Jackson	

== Awards and recognition ==
In 2017, Jackson received a Jonathan Larson Grant from the American Theatre Wing and was one of 11 winners of the 2017 Lincoln Center Emerging Artist Award. He was also a Sundance Theatre Institute Composer Fellow and a 2016–2017 Dramatist Guild Fellow.

Jackson was named one of the "Black Male Writers for our Time" by The New York Times in 2018. In 2019, he received a Whiting Award for drama and a Helen Merrill Award for Playwriting. In 2020, Jackson was awarded the Pulitzer Prize for Drama for A Strange Loop, becoming the first black musical theatre writer to win the award. He was also the winner of the Lambda Literary Award for Drama and a Fred Ebb Award for aspiring musical theatre songwriters. Additionally, Jackson received two Drama Desk Awards, two Obie Awards, two Outer Critics Circle Award Honors, and an Antonyo Award for Best Book for A Strange Loop.

In June 2020, in honor of the 50th anniversary of the first LGBTQ Pride parade, Queerty named him among the fifty heroes "leading the nation toward equality, acceptance, and dignity for all people". In 2022, Jackson was featured in the book 50 Key Figures in Queer US Theatre, with a profile written by theatre scholar Aviva Helena Neff.

In March 2021, Jackson was awarded the Windham–Campbell Literature Prize for drama.

At the 75th Tony Awards, Jackson's musical A Strange Loop was nominated for 11 awards, winning Best Musical and Best Book of a Musical.

== Personal life ==
Jackson studied at Cass Technical High School and attended New York University. He is openly gay.

== See also ==
- African-American Tony nominees and winners
