= James Ortiz =

American puppet designer (born 1984)

- Ortiz in 2026
- Born: February 16, 1984 (age 42); Albany, New York, US
- Education: Collin College (attended); State University of New York, Purchase (BFA)
- Occupations: Actor; puppet designer; puppeteer; director
- Years active: 2010–present
- Notable work: The Woodsman, Project Hail Mary
- Awards: Obie Award, Drama Desk Award
- Website: jamesortiz.co

James Ortiz (born February 16, 1984) is an American puppet designer, puppeteer, actor and director working in theater, opera, and film. He won an Obie Award for puppet design for The Woodsman, and the Drama Desk Award for Outstanding Puppet Design for the 2022 Broadway revival of The Skin of Our Teeth. He voiced and operated the puppet for Rocky in the film Project Hail Mary.

== Early life and education ==
James Ortiz was born on February 16, 1984, in Albany, New York, of Puerto Rican and Italian ancestry, and grew up in Richardson, Texas. He was introduced to puppetry by a touring marionette group. He built puppets in high school. He attended Collin County Community College, where he designed puppets for a production of The Rocky Horror Show called The Rocky Horror (Puppet) Show. He then went to Purchase College, graduating with a Bachelor of Fine Arts in Acting in 2010.

== Career ==
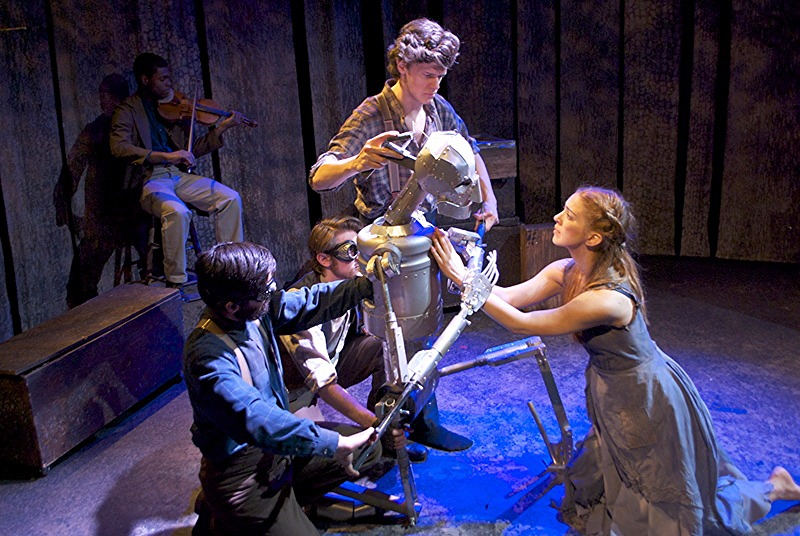
Ortiz performing in The Woodsman in 2015

In 2010, Ortiz and classmates from the acting conservatory at Purchase College, including Jason Ralph whom he had met at Collin College, founded the theater group Strangemen and Company. With Strangemen, Ortiz co-conceived and developed the play The Woodsman, based on L. Frank Baum's Tin Woodman, which premiered in 2012 in Brooklyn. He co-directed and performed in the work, playing the title character, Nick Chopper. The Woodsman had three off-Broadway runs, in 2014, 2015, and 2016; Ortiz won an Obie Award for puppet design for the 2016 production.

Ortiz's first job after college was with the British puppet theater Blind Summit and Tectonic Theater Project at the New Victory Theater as a puppeteer in El gato con botas (Puss in Boots). He has built puppets for Theatre for a New Audience and The New Group. In 2017, he designed the puppets for The Public Theater's Public Works production of As You Like It, which was remounted in 2022. With Public Works, he also designed the puppets for a 2019 production of Disney's Hercules.

Ortiz designed the set and puppets for a production of Zémire et Azor he directed for Opera Saratoga in 2017. In 2023, he directed, and designed the puppets and scenery for Leonard Bernstein's Candide at the Skylight Music Theatre in Milwaukee, Wisconsin.

Ortiz won the Drama Desk Award for Outstanding Puppet Design for the 2022 Broadway production of Thornton Wilder's play The Skin of Our Teeth. In 2022, his puppet designs also appeared on Broadway in a revival of Into the Woods.

Working with designer Neal Scanlan, Ortiz led a team operating the puppet for the alien character Rocky in the 2026 film Project Hail Mary. During filming, Ortiz recited Rocky's dialogue for actor Ryan Gosling to play against, believing the lines would be replaced by a more famous actor, but directors Phil Lord and Christopher Miller kept his performance in the film. Rocky has been described as the "breakout star" of the film, and Variety has reported that Ortiz's performance will be submitted for the Academy Award for Best Supporting Actor category.

Ortiz has designed puppets for the Metropolitan Opera, including the 2024 production of John Adams's El Niño, and the fall 2026 premiere of Missy Mazzoli's Lincoln in the Bardo, adapted from the novel of the same name.
