= Song from the Uproar: The Lives and Deaths of Isabelle Eberhardt =

Opera by Missy Mazzoli

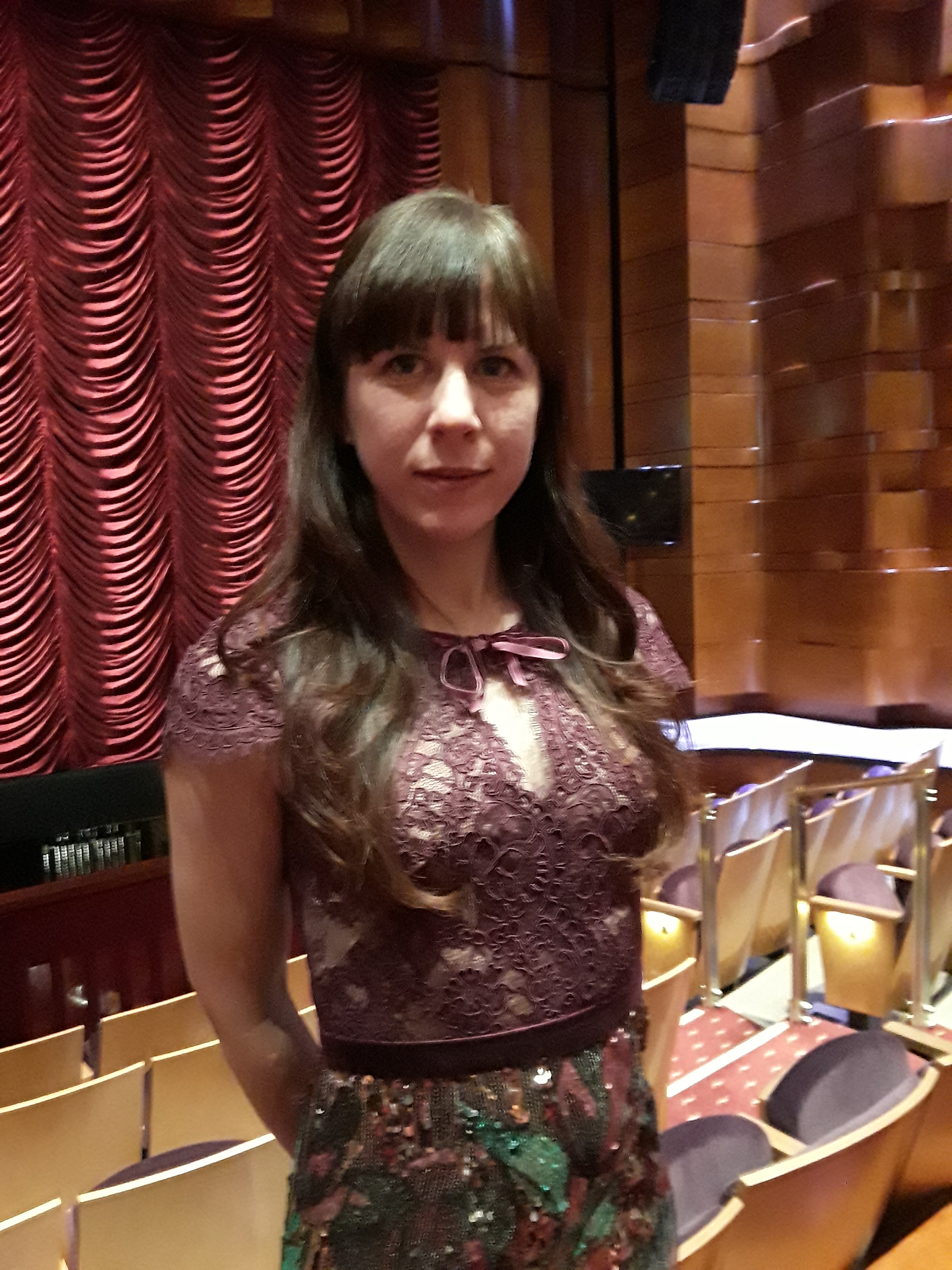
Missy Mazzoli in 2018

Song from the Uproar: The Lives and Deaths of Isabelle Eberhardt is an opera in one act by Missy Mazzoli with a libretto by Royce Vavrek and Mazzoli. It is inspired by the life of Swiss explorer and writer Isabelle Eberhardt.

The work was commissioned by Beth Morrison Projects and premiered in February 2012 at downtown New York venue The Kitchen.

The work was initially written for mezzo-soprano Abigail Fischer.

== Roles ==
Role	Voice type	Premiere cast, February, 2012 (Conductor: Steven Osgood)
Isabelle Eberhardt	mezzo-soprano	Abigail Fischer

== Productions ==
- Beth Morrison Projects at The Kitchen (2012)
- Los Angeles Opera (Beth Morrison Project Production) (2015)
- Milwaukee Opera Theatre (2016)
- Chicago Fringe Opera (2016)
- Cincinnati Opera (2017)
- Opera Ithaca (2018)
- Independent student production at Wesleyan University (2020)
- Verdigris Ensemble (2025)

== Critical reception ==
The Los Angeles Times praised Mazzoli's score, calling it "seductive, meditative, spiritually elusive and subversive. With it, we can welcome a new natural for the art form."

For The New York Times Steve Smith wrote that "in the electric surge of Ms. Mazzoli’s score you felt the joy, risk and limitless potential of free spirits unbound."

Lauren Alfano of I Care If You Listen called it a "masterpiece of modern opera."
