= Lincoln in the Bardo (opera) =

2026 opera by Missy Mazzoli

- Opera by Missy Mazzoli
- Librettist: Royce Vavrek
- Language: English
- Based on: Lincoln in the Bardo by George Saunders
- Premiere: October 19, 2026; Metropolitan Opera

Lincoln in the Bardo is an English-language opera in two acts, with music by Missy Mazzoli and libretto by Royce Vavrek. It is based on the novel of the same name by George Saunders. The Metropolitan Opera commissioned the work, and it premiered there in New York City on October 19, 2026, running through November 14. It is the first opera composed by a woman to be premiered by the Met. Reviews were largely positive, with critics praising Mazzoli's score and director Lileana Blain-Cruz's staging.

== Background ==
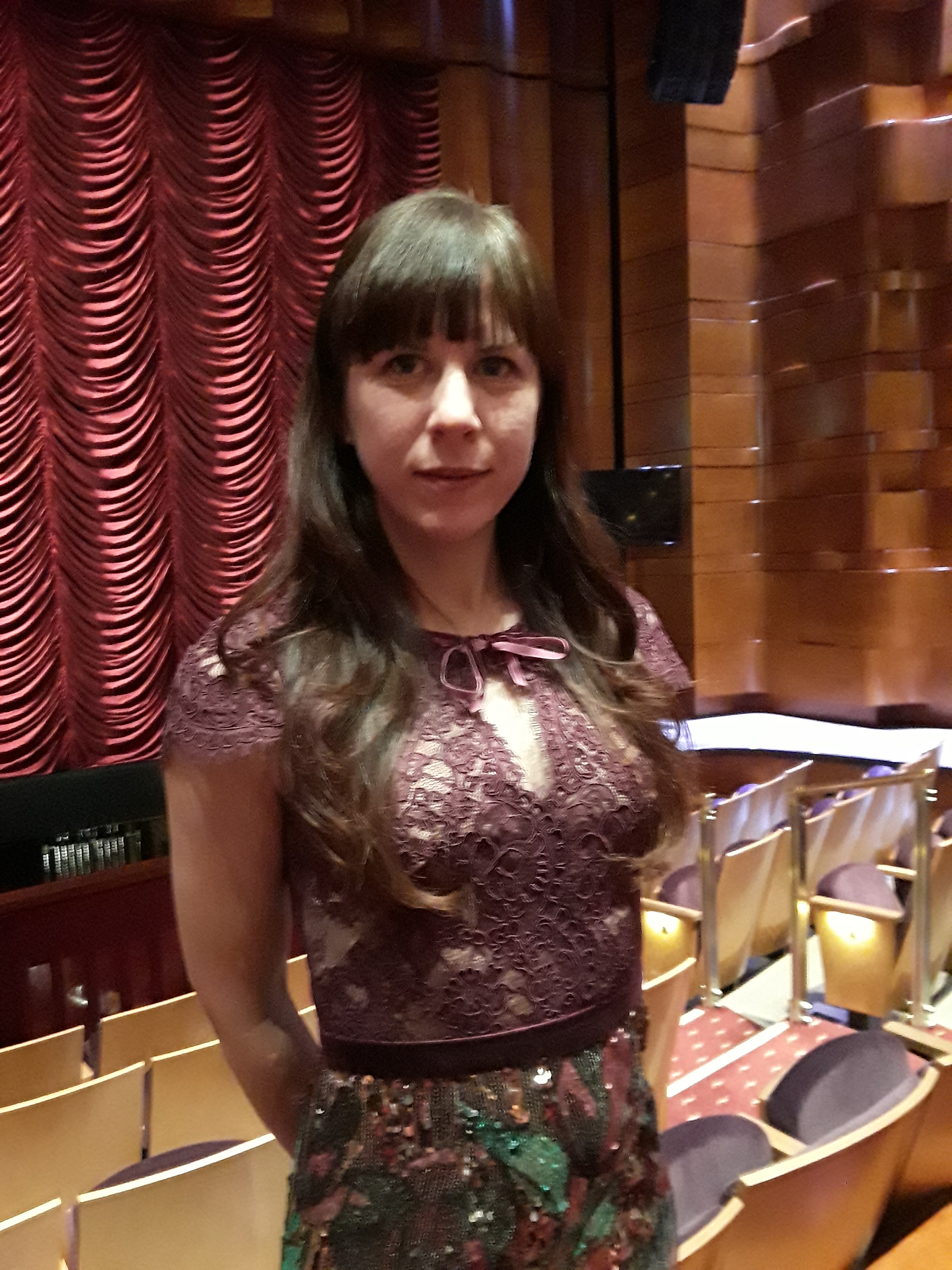
Missy Mazzoli became the first female composer to have a premiere at the Met with Lincoln in the Bardo.

The Met commissioned the opera in 2018, when Missy Mazzoli and Jeanine Tesori became the first two women to receive Met commissions. Lincoln in the Bardo is the first work by a female composer the Met has premiered. The opera was supposed to premiere at the Los Angeles Opera but the run was canceled, leading unintentionally to its Met premiere. Royce Vavrek, an admirer of George Saunders, proposed adapting the novel into an opera to Mazzoli shortly after the book's release. When the Met met with Mazzoli to ask what stories she wanted to tell, she blurted out "Lincoln in the Bardo" without having prepared beforehand, not wanting to jinx the meeting. Saunders first met Mazzoli roughly a decade before the premiere in a Manhattan pub to discuss a possible adaptation. He had originally conceived the book as a play and had imagined it as an opera even while writing it, and took a hands-off approach to the operatic adaptation.

The opera is Mazzoli's and Vavrek's sixth operatic collaboration. It is Mazzoli's Met debut. Mazzoli said that was she freed to experiment with unconventional vocal techniques when she realized that every character except Lincoln was a ghost. It is an opera in two acts.

== Roles ==
Roles, voice types, premiere cast
Role	Voice type (Note: Voice types follow the Metropolitan Opera's artist listings.)	Premiere cast New York, October 19, 2026 Conductor: Yannick Nézet-Séguin (Note: Steven Osgood conducts on October 31.)
Lincoln	baritone	Peter Mattei
Willie Lincoln	treble	Everett Sobers (Note: Michael Hurst sings Willie Lincoln on October 31 and November 14.)
Vollman	bass-baritone	Ryan McKinny
Bevins	tenor	Jonah Hoskins
Reverend	soprano	Christine Goerke
Miss Elise Traynor	countertenor	Anthony Roth Costanzo
Thomas Havens	tenor	Joshua Blue
Mrs. Francis Hodge	soprano	Janai Brugger
Mr. Baron	bass-baritone	Craig Colclough
Mrs. Baron	mezzo-soprano	Stephanie Blythe
Litzie	soprano	Viviana Goodwin
Ginger Chap from Maine	bass-baritone	Christopher Job
Doodling Pennsylvanian	tenor	Scott Scully

== Synopsis ==
=== Act 1 ===
The opera is set in a Washington cemetery during the Civil War. President Abraham Lincoln visits his son Willie Lincoln's crypt after his death, as the ghosts in the cemetery tell their stories. The "bardo" is a Tibetan term for the intermediate state between death and rebirth, and the ghosts buried in the cemetery do not realize they are dead, lingering inside of the bardo. They believe they are convalescing, call their coffins "sick-boxes", and spend their time retelling the lives they left unfinished. They fear the moment of passing on to the next existence, which they call "matterlightblooming". Among the ghosts are Vollman, a middle-aged printer killed by a falling beam just before he could consummate his marriage; Bevins, a young gay man who killed himself after being rejected; and the Reverend, a deceased clergyman. Miss Elise Traynor, a fourteen-year-old who has stayed too long, has become a warning of what happens to children who "tarry" in the "bardo".

Willie Lincoln, the president's eleven year old son, has just died and joined them, and neither he nor his father has accepted the death. President Lincoln comes to the crypt at night and embraces his son's body, and the ghosts find that they can enter living people and share their thoughts. Vollman, Bevins and the Reverend set out to get both father and son to move on from the tragedy of Willie's death.

=== Act 2 ===
The Reverend reveals that unlike the other ghosts, he knows he is dead. He was judged after his death and condemned, and fled to the bardo rather than accept his fate. President Lincoln returns to the crypt to say goodbye to his son, but cannot bring himself to leave. In the climax, the spirits, led by Thomas Havens, a Black freedman, come together to enter Lincoln together. The Reverend frees Willie from the tendrils that have trapped him in the bardo and sacrifices himself by passing on, giving Willie time to escape to the chapel where his father is praying. Willie realizes that he is dead upon hearing his father's thoughts, and moves on, with many of the other ghosts following him. President Lincoln, urged by the ghosts of the enslaved to use his power on behalf of people like them, resolves to return to the war. He rides out of the cemetery with Havens inside him.

== Performance history ==
The premiere at the Met Opera was directed by Lileana Blain-Cruz and conducted by Yannick Nézet-Séguin, running from October 19, 2026 to November 14. Puppet designer James Ortiz was responsible for creating puppets throughout the production, including the tendrils that wrap around Willie and pig heads, an iron furnace, and a terrifying vulture-like creature during the appearance of Miss Elise Traynor. Costume designer Montana Levi Blanco repurposed historical costumes in the Met Opera's archives for the ghost characters, adding mold and other textures to show them as having been through wear. Mazzoli wrote the role of the Reverend with soprano Christine Goerke in mind from the start: Goerke said she had waited "[her] whole life" for a part to be written for her like it.

Lincoln in the Bardo was co-produced by the Jacobs School of Music at Indiana University, which will perform it in April 2028.

== Reception ==
The Met Opera production received largely positive reviews from critics, with praise for Mazzoli's score, the cast's work, and Blain-Cruz's production, but with more divided opinions on the libretto. Joshua Barone of The New York Times gave the opera a "Critic's Pick" designation, calling the adaptation "as funny, strange and big-hearted as the novel" and describing Mazzoli and Vavrek as "among the finest partnerships in opera today". The Wall Street Journal's Heidi Waleson said that it had successfully adapted the novel, and had "done that and more" in a positive note. Emma Hoffman of The Times said that the opera was the most successful of the Met's recent literary adaptations in a positive review, saying that she felt the work would have "an afterlife of its own". The Atlantic's Talya Zax called the opera excellent and "hugely entertaining", arguing that it showed how an operatic adaptation can preserve a novel's strangeness in a way that film rarely can.

Peter Mattei's performance as Abraham Lincoln was praised by critics: Barone called it the high point of the performance, and Waleson called his work the "serious heart" of the opera. Barone felt that Anthony Roth Costanzo's role as Miss Elise Traynor was tailor-made for him, but Hoffman argued that his role was less successful than other parts. Zax also particularly praised the casting of a countertenor for Miss Elise Traynor, which she felt made the character's fate feel more visceral.

Reviews were more mixed on Vavrek's libretto. Online publications like TheaterMania saw Zachary Stewart give the overall performance a negative note, specifically criticizing Vavrek's lyrics in particular as "banal to turgid", but giving praise to the set design and James Ortiz's puppet work. OperaMania's David Salazar also criticized Vavrek's libretto as "opting for the most simplistic and basic use of the English language", but argued that Lincoln in the Bardo proved its worth for the stage. For I Care if You Listen, the reviewer Stephanie Boyd complimented that "moments of quirkiness and lewd levity helped to retain Saunders' dark humor and mood-mining flavor while creating space to discuss death for nearly three hours."

In contrast to some of the more critical notes from online blogs, major newspaper and magazine critics were more impressed with the libretto. Barone and Waleson both praised the libretto specifically, with Barone saying that Vavrek took on the "distinct voice of each character with ease" and Waleson calling the work an "elegant libretto, which deftly repurposes Mr. Saunders's evocative period language". For the The Boston Globe, Ty Burr wrote, "The libretto by Mazzoli's longtime collaborator Royce Vavrek does an impressive job of condensing the sprawl of Saunders's novel." In his review for The New Yorker, Nathan Heller wrote that "Vavrek ably repaces Saunders's story line and carries its texty voices into song".

== Music ==
Mazzoli has cited John Corigliano's The Ghosts of Versailles, whose central characters are also dead, as an inspiration for her work on Lincoln. The score opens with the chorus playing into kazoos, which is meant to signify that the opera is not set in reality. Mazzoli makes frequent use of open fifths to leave the harmony suspended between major and minor keys, and the orchestration includes the celesta, organ, and some unconventional effects like knitting needles struck on the bars of a vibraphone. Lincoln has four arias, and the Reverend's account of being "unworthy" on the Day of Judgement is a grand scena for a dramatic soprano with inspiration from Bartók Bluebeard's Castle.
