= Breaking the Waves (opera) =

Opera by Missy Mazzoli

Breaking the Waves is an opera in three acts by Missy Mazzoli with a libretto by Royce Vavrek. It is based on the 1996 film of the same name by Danish auteur Lars von Trier. The opera was first performed on September 22, 2016, by Opera Philadelphia.

== Commissioning and performances ==
The opera was commissioned and premiered by Opera Philadelphia. The work was co-commissioned by Beth Morrison Projects. The New York City Prototype Festival showed this production in three performances in January 2017 at the Skirball Center for the Performing Arts.

The opera received its European premiere on 21 August 2019 as part of the Edinburgh International Festival in a new co-production between Opera Ventures, Scottish Opera and Houston Grand Opera, in association with Bristol Old Vic. The production ran for three performances and was directed by Tom Morris, Sydney Mancasola sang Bess, Wallis Giunta sang Dodo, Susan Bullock sang Bess's Mother. In 2024, the production was performed at Detroit Opera.

== Roles ==
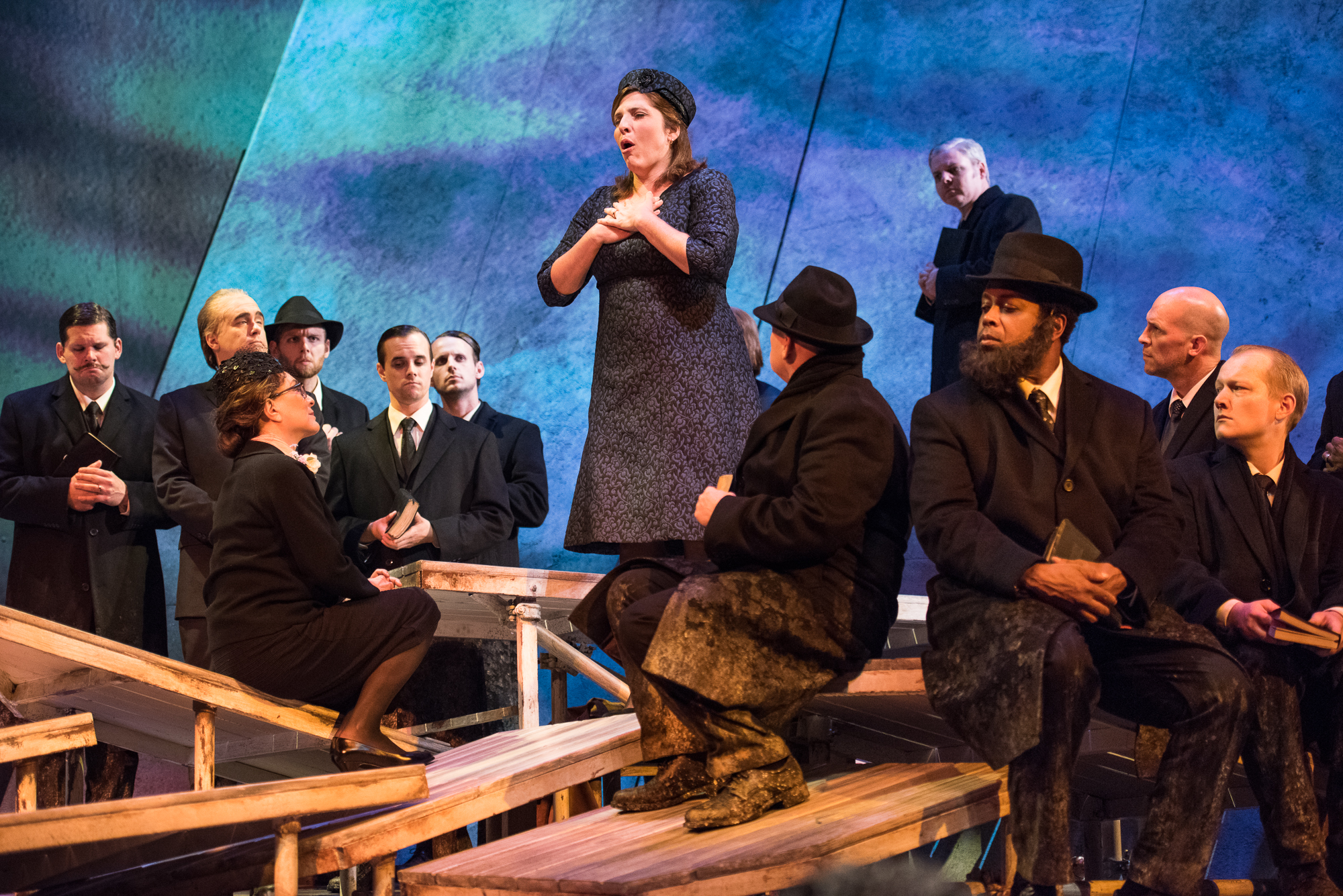
Scene from the Opera Philadelphia production.

Role	Voice type	Premiere cast, 22 September 2016 (Conductor: Steven Osgood)
Bess McNeill	soprano	Kiera Duffy
Jan Nyman	baritone	John Moore
Dodo McNeill	mezzo-soprano	Eve Gigliotti
Mrs. McNeill	soprano	Patricia Schuman
Dr. Richardson	tenor	David Portillo
Terry	bass-baritone	Zachary James
Minister	bass-baritone	Marcus DeLoach
Sadistic Sailor	bass	John David Miles
The Runt	tenor	George Ross Somerville
The Stone Thrower	tenor	Daniel Taylor

== Synopsis ==
Set in the Scottish Highlands in the early 1970s, Breaking the Waves tells the story of Bess McNeill, a religious young woman with a deep love for her husband Jan, a handsome oil rig worker. When Jan becomes paralyzed in an off-shore accident, Bess's marital vows are put to the test as he encourages her to seek other lovers and return to his bedside to tell him of her sexual activities. He insists that the stories will feel like they are making love together and keep him alive. Bess's increasing selflessness leads to a finale of divine grace, but at great cost.

== Critical reception ==
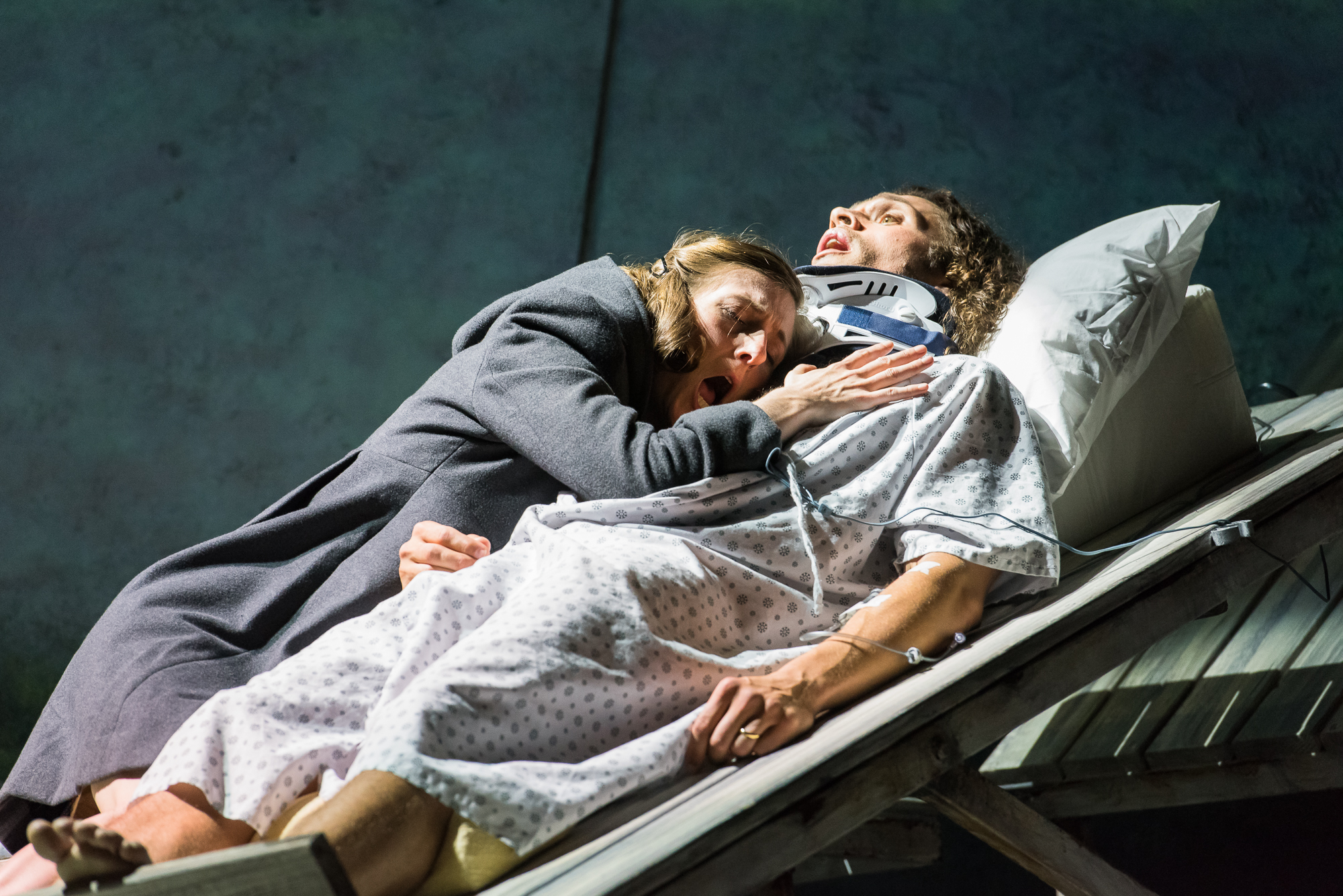
Scene from the Opera Philadelphia production.

Breaking the Waves was widely seen by critics as a major success. It won the inaugural Best New Opera Award from the Music Critics Association of North America, and was shortlisted for "Best World Premiere" Prize at the International Opera Awards.

"Missy Mazzoli's Breaking the Waves, which had its world premiere at Opera Philadelphia on Thursday, is savage, heartbreaking and thoroughly original. The 1996 Lars von Trier film on which it is based has a disturbing undercurrent of violent misogyny, but the operatic Bess McNeill, for all her frailties, is no victim. Classic tragic opera heroines may weep and die, but Bess, as conceived by Ms. Mazzoli and librettist Royce Vavrek, and sung by the extraordinary Kiera Duffy, is an evolving, unforgettable character". Heidi Waleson, The Wall Street Journal

"...the desperate scenario of self-destruction and redemption seems to be a projection of Bess's will to believe, her reshaping of the fabric of the world. Mazzoli’s score supports that dynamic by wedding strong lyric invention to an unsettled, insidiously dissonant chamber-orchestra texture that evokes the jagged beauty both of Skye and of Bess's inner landscape. Benjamin Britten is a palpable influence, particularly in thrashing orchestral tempests and some melismatic, Peter Quint-like writing for tenor. Yet Mazzoli absorbs these and other elements into her own spare, propulsive voice". Alex Ross, The New Yorker

"It is not easy to find new operas that command attention, tell their story lucidly and create a powerful, permeating mood. Dark and daring, Breaking the Waves does all this with sensitivity and style". Zachary Woolfe, The New York Times.

At its European premiere, in a new production directed by Tom Morris for Scottish Opera and John Berry's Opera Ventures at the Edinburgh International Festival, the work again was praised including a five star review in The Scotsman calling it "operatic gold". Soprano Sydney Mancasola was awarded a Herald Angel Award for her performance as Bess, a prize awarded by The Herald, Glasgow, to stand-out contributions among all of the summer festivals in the Edinburgh.
