= Guy Rabut =

American luthier

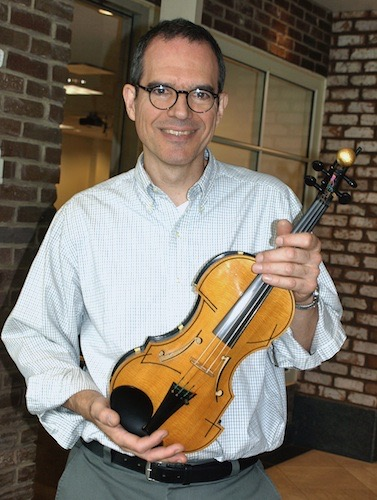
Guy Rabut

Guy Rabut is an American luthier based in New York City.

Rabut grew up in Westport, Connecticut.

In 1975 he began studying with the luthier Paul Hart at the Violin Making School of America, and in 1984 opened his own premises in New York. In 1992 he opened a workshop above Carnegie Hall. Subsequently he moved his workshop to West 28th St., New York.

He is known for his 1995 creation The Black Violin, thus named because the instrument's back features black varnish with a gold leaf design. Rabut based the Black Violin on a schematic of the interior of a Guarneri Del Gesu, redesigning all aspects of the instrument that had no primary acoustical function. These included the corner profiles, the scroll, the accessories, and the color of the varnish. The traditional specifications were meticulously adhered to with regard to critical acoustical components such as arching, the graduation of the plates, and the internal air cavity. As of January 2020, The Black Violin was owned and played by Edward W. Hardy.
