= John Berry (arts administrator) =

British-born musician and arts administrator (born 1961)

John Edward Berry CBE (born 22 July 1961) is a British-born musician and arts administrator.

== Biography ==
Berry graduated from the Royal Northern College of Music in 1983; training at that institution as a clarinetist. He subsequently studied with Gervase de Peyer, supported by a scholarship to the Mannes College of Music in New York City. In 1984, he was diagnosed with Hodgkin's Disease, and returned to the UK for successful treatment at The Christie Hospital in Manchester. He was unable to continue playing the clarinet professionally after his illness, and redirected his career to arts administration.

Berry served as the founding director of the Sounds Alive Music Centres from 1986 to 1993. He then founded the Brereton International Music Symposium, and served as its director from 1990 to 1997 working with artists such as Thomas Hampson, Birgit Nilsson and Brigitte Fassbaender.

Throughout his career he has been an advocate for Opera, not only nurturing both new approaches to existing operas and the creation of new operas, but also to advocate for engaging stories from a wider field of writers, and exploring pragmatic and creative ways to attract new patrons for Opera.

Alongside his efforts within the private sector, John Berry has also appealed to public office for a bolder approach to the arts funding and creative education.

== English National Opera ==
In 1995, Berry joined English National Opera (ENO) as casting director, and served in the post from 1995 to 2003. He instigated the first 'Jerwood Young Artists Programme', which later developed into 'The ENO Harewood Artists'. He became Director of Opera Programming in 2003, and was subsequently named ENO's artistic director in November 2005. The last appointment was controversial, as the ENO board made the appointment without external interviews. As ENO's artistic director, he brought in artists from outside the opera world into ENO productions, including film directors (Anthony Minghella, Terry Gilliam, Penny Woolcock, Mike Leigh), theatre directors (Rupert Goold, Simon McBurney, Fiona Shaw and Improbable), visual artists (Matthew Barney, Anish Kapoor) and choreographers (Mark Morris, Michael Keegan-Dolan). His acclaimed co-producing policy extended ENO's reach to more than 40 opera houses around the world, the most prominent being the relationship with the Metropolitan Opera House, New York, which resulted in more than a dozen opera collaborations, including the recently acclaimed Akhnaten (Philip Glass) and Porgy and Bess (Gershwin). Berry championed major American composers during his time, including John Adams, Philip Glass and Nico Muhly. ENO performed a new production of John Adams' The Death of Klinghoffer in February 2012. This controversial piece was performed to great critical acclaim.

Despite Berry's skepticism about cinema relays of operas in May 2012, in December 2013 ENO announced a new relationship with Altive Media to take ENO's productions into cinemas. A good example of this new approach was the success of Mike Leigh's production of The Pirates of Penzance, which broke box office records. Other developments led by Berry at the company included, in 2014, a new relationship with restaurateur Ben Warner and Benugo for the redevelopment of the London Coliseum foyer spaces, and a new commercial relationship with Lord Grade and Michael Linnit (the GradeLinnit Company) to produce semi-staged musicals, beginning with the critically acclaimed Sweeney Todd by Stephen Sondheim, featuring actress Emma Thompson and opera singer Bryn Terfel. The last actions were in response to the 29% reduction in Arts Council England (ACE) funding.

For the first time in its history, Berry took the ENO out of the London Coliseum into venues including The Young Vic Theatre, the Barbican Theatre, Hampstead Theatre and produced a ground-breaking production with the acclaimed immersive theatre group, Punchdrunk, in a disused building (former headquarters of a pharmaceutical company) to the east of London, several stops along the Docklands Light Railway at Gallions Reach.

Berry also led important television projects. In 2009 a partnership between ENO and Sky Arts led to the TV broadcasting of Jonathan Miller's production of La bohème, which aired on Sky Arts HD and Sky Arts 2 simultaneously. In 2011, for the first time, a live opera, Mike Figgis' production of Lucrezia Borgia, was aired in 3D and broadcast by Sky TV. Later in the same year, the BBC filmed Terry Gilliam's production of La damnation de Faust for BBC Television.

Awards won during Berry's tenure include:

- Double Olivier Award winner in 2015
- Royal Philharmonic Society Music Awards (RPS) for ENO's Consistently Outstanding Work 2015 in the Opera and Music Theatre category
- 8 Olivier Awards
- 4 South Bank Sky Arts Awards
- 5 Royal Philharmonic Society Awards
- Winner of 2014 The Hospital Club 100 in Theatre for the "most innovative and inspirational people working across the creative industries"
- Evening Standard (2013 / 2014 / 2015) Top 1000 most influential people in London

In February 2015, ACE placed ENO under special measures. This had followed public revelations of disputes between the outgoing chairman of ENO, Martyn Rose, and the ENO board, with unfounded and uncorroborated accusations by Rose that ENO had mismanaged finances under Berry's watch, and the departure of Henriette Götz as executive director in January 2015 after a short period in the post. ENO publicly countered Rose's accusation by stating that during Berry's tenure, ENO "turned over an unrestricted surplus of £2.4M." Martyn Rose left ENO in January 2015 after only 21 months in his post. In July 2015, following the widely acclaimed 2014-2015 season at ENO, Berry stood down as ENO longest serving leader of the company, stating "My work is now done."

== Bolshoi Theater of Russia ==
In July 2016 Berry was appointed creative advisor to the Bolshoi Theatre. In October 2017, he negotiated a co-production agreement between the Bolshoi and Metropolitan Opera New York for three operas, Lohengrin, Aida and Salome, all featuring Anna Netrebko. Other upcoming projects with close collaborators of Berry will include David Alden's 2021 production of Ariodante.

Simon McBurney's new production of Khovanshchina was due to premiere in June 2022 but was cancelled due to the Russian invasion of Ukraine. This was to be Berry's final project with the Bolshoi.

== Opera Ventures ==
Berry founded the charity Opera Ventures in March 2017, to create new productions of contemporary opera by living composers. The unique operating model means that more than 90% of donations goes directly into productions.

Productions to date are:

- Greek, by Mark-Anthony Turnage was Opera Venture's first production and premiered in August 2017, co-produced with Scottish Opera and in collaboration with the Edinburgh International Festival, followed by performances at the Brooklyn Academy of Music, New York.
- Breaking the Waves by Missy Mazzoli was its second production, co-produced with Scottish Opera, Houston Grand Opera and Théâtre de l'Opéra-Comique in association with Bristol Old Vic. It premiered at the King's Theater in Edinburgh on 21 August 2019 with performances until 24 August. It opened at the Adelaide Festival in March 2020 to critical acclaim. Performances in collaboration with the Brooklyn Academy of Music and the Metropolitan Orchestra conducted by their music director Yannick Nézet-Séguin, due to take place in July 2020, were cancelled due to the COVID-19 pandemic.
- A new production of Ainadamar by Osvaldo Golijov, the UK staged premiere, opened to critical acclaim on 29 October 2022, co-produced with Scottish Opera, the Metropolitan Opera New York City, Detroit Opera and Welsh National Opera. It premiered at the Metropolitan Opera in New York in October 2024 to wide critical acclaim.
- The Galloping Cure, an opera about the opioid addiction crisis, composed by Missy Mazzoli to a story by Karen Russell and Royce Vavrek, directed by Tom Morris, premiered on 09 August 2026 at the Edinburgh International Festival to great acclaim, being hailed by The Times as one of the greatest operas of this century.

== Scenario2 ==
In November 2018 he officially launched a commercial theatre production company, Scenario 2, together with co-director Anthony Lilley OBE. Its first production is The Light in the Piazza by Adam Guettel featuring Renée Fleming and Disney artist Dove Cameron, premiered at the Southbank Centre's Royal Festival Hall in London on 14 June 2019 with performances until 6 July 2019. The show then moved on to the USA, where its opening night took place on 12 October in Los Angeles in collaboration with Los Angeles Opera at the Dorothy Chandler Pavilion. It then moved to Chicago from 14 to 20 December 2019 with outstanding reviews. Its premiere in August 2020 at the Sydney Opera House was cancelled due to the Covid-19 pandemic, with future dates to be announced early 2021. Scenario Two is also preparing a new staged musical production about the life of the late Italian tenor Luciano Pavarotti, directed by Hollywood film director and creator of The Greatest Showman, Michael Gracey.

Terry Gilliam's production of Into the Woods by Stephen Sondheim opened at the Theatre Royal Bath in August 2022 to 3, 4 and 5 star reviews.

The company created a brand-new musical based on the best-selling book The Parent Agency by comedian and author David Baddiel, with music and additional lyrics by Dan Gillespie Sells (Jamie the Musical) and directed by Tim Jackson that will be brought to the stage in February 2025 at Storyhouse Chester.

== Other work ==
Other work has included employment as an artist manager at Harrison Parrott (1992–1994), a consultant to The Hallé Orchestra from 1998 to 2002, and as an advisor to several USA opera companies, such as Santa Fe Opera. He was an artistic and broadcasting consultant (1998–2006) for several video productions of operas, including:

- BBC Films: Turn of the Screw (directed by Katie Mitchell);
- Channel 4: Trouble in Tahiti (directed by Tom Cairns), winner of Best Performance Film at the Vienna TV Awards, Gramophone's Best DVD Award and the DVD 'Or de l'Année Award from Diapason magazine in France
- Channel 4: John Adams' opera The Death of Klinghoffer (directed by Penny Woolcock) winner of the Prix Italia for TV Performing Arts and nominated for the South Bank Show Opera Award.

Berry was adviser to the Vienna State Opera from July 2018 to August 2019. The 2020–21 season opened with ENO's production of Anthony Minghella's Madama Butterfly.

== Personal life ==
Berry is married to the mezzo-soprano Pippa Dames-Longworth. He was made a CBE in the Queens Birthday Honours in 2014, for Services to Music.
