= JFK (opera) =

Opera by American composer David T. Little

JFK is an opera in three acts by American composer David T. Little, with an English-language libretto by Royce Vavrek. The opera's story is based on the final night of American president John F. Kennedy's life that was spent in at the Hotel Texas in Fort Worth, prior to his assassination in Dallas, on November 22, 1963.

The opera was commissioned by Fort Worth Opera, Opéra de Montréal and American Lyric Theater, and received its premiere at Fort Worth Opera on April 23, 2016 in a production directed by Thaddeus Strassberger.

== Roles ==
Roles, voice types, premiere cast
Role	Voice type	Premiere cast, April 23, 2016 (Conductor: Steven Osgood)
John F. "Jack" Kennedy	baritone	Matthew Worth
Jacqueline "Jackie" Bouvier Kennedy	mezzo-soprano	Daniela Mack
Reporter	tenor	Brian Wallin
Clara Harris / Fate 1 (Clotho)	soprano	Talise Trevigne
Henry Rathbone / Fate 2 (Lachesis)	tenor	Sean Panikkar
Fate 3 (Atropos)	silent role	
Rosemary Kennedy	soprano	Cree Carrico
Nikita Khrushchev	tenor	Casey Finnigan
Jackie Onassis	mezzo-soprano	Katharine Goeldner
Lyndon B. Johnson	bass-baritone	Daniel Okulitch
Billie Sol Estes	tenor	Jared Welch
Ralph Yarborough	baritone	Christopher Leach
John Connally	baritone	Brett Bode
Raymond J. Buck	baritone	Clay Thompson
Jim Wright	bass	Johnny Salvesen

Many critics wrote about a disorienting dream that Jackie experiences involving the historical figures Clara Harris and Henry Rathbone. In his preview for The New York Times, David Allen explained that the opera "layers time most obviously in two 'characters in triplicate,' as Mr. Little puts it. Superficially, they are Henry and Clara, a secret service agent and a maid. In another guise, they inhabit Greek mythology as Lachesis and Clotho, the fates who spin and measure the thread of life. In still a third, they are a couple who attended Ford's Theatre with Abraham Lincoln: Henry, who was stabbed by John Wilkes Booth, was later driven mad and killed Clara while attacking their children."

== Reception ==
The world premiere received positive reviews, including a rave from Henry Stewart in Opera News who called the work a "ravishing grand opera", "a triumphant work", and suggested that "JFK isn't history or even biography—it's a love story, a very sad one about growing old but not getting to grow old enough."

Another rave was published in The Wall Street Journal by Heidi Waleson who compared the work to Little and Vavrek's groundbreaking previous opera by saying "Mr. Little's score juxtaposes the insistent, propulsive cacophony of Dog Days with expressive melody", and celebrating "Mr. Vavrek's surreally layered, poetic and theatrically well-paced libretto".

Yet another rave was found in Dallas Observer by Wayne Lee Gay who commented that "the drama and ideas flowed seamlessly, thanks not only to a beautifully structured libretto that pulls these ideas together, but a score in which a smooth quasi-minimalism provides a foundation for frequent journeys into radiant neo-romanticism."

Mark Swed, in the Los Angeles Times called it "[a]n opera operating on many levels, it has something for everyone." He continued to rave that "Little's score has flashes of his brilliant, hard-driving percussive style. His music theater is often haunted by ghosts, and some of the most effective moments in JFK are found in the otherworldliness of the orchestral colors. Add to that his talent for songful melody and weakness for instrumental shock, and you have a fine cocktail for modern grand opera."

The most controversial scene proved to be a dream sequence in which Lyndon B. Johnson appears as an exaggerated cowboy, a moment that a number of critics took issue with, including Scott Cantrell of The Dallas Morning News who called it "acutely offensive", and James L. Paulk suggesting it was "vulgar" in Classical Voice America, but Olin Chism in the Fort Worth Star-Telegram noted that the "low comedy" received "the biggest laughs of the evening." Anthony Tommasini of The New York Times called it "comic crudity", though Waleson, in her review for The Wall Street Journal, praised the scene and the depiction of Johnson "who sings a swaggering rockabilly anthem and calls [Kennedy] a 'pussy' [providing] comedic chaos with appropriate hints of nastiness."

== See also ==
- Cultural depictions of John F. Kennedy
