= Sydney Mancasola =

American operatic soprano singer

- Born: August 5, 1987 (age 38); Shasta, California, U.S.
- Genres: Opera
- Occupation: Opera singer (soprano)
- Years active: 2011–present
- Website: sydneymancasolasoprano.com

Sydney Mancasola (born August 5, 1987) is an American operatic soprano singer.

== Early life and education ==
Sydney Mancasola was born in Shasta, California on August 5, 1987. She was raised in Redding, California, and began studying violin at the age of 2. She earned an undergraduate degree in vocal performance, under the tutelage of Daune Mahy at Oberlin Conservatory of Music and a graduate degree from the Academy of Vocal Arts in Philadelphia, where she studied with American baritone, William Stone.

== Career ==
Mancasola began her operatic career at Opera Theatre of Saint Louis as a Gerdine Young Artist in 2011 where she later returned to sing Violetta in La traviata in 2018 and Lisette in La rondine, and was later awarded the Mabel Dorn Reeder Foundation Prize in 2016.

Mancasola was named a winner of the 2013 Metropolitan Opera National Council Auditions and returned to the Metropolitan Opera in 2019 to make her house debut as Pamina in The Magic Flute and Frasquita in Carmen. She subsequently went on to sing the title role in Manon and Countess Adèle in Rossini's Le comte Ory with Des Moines Metro Opera, Marie in La fille du régiment with Palm Beach Opera, and Leïla in Les pêcheurs de perles with Florida Grand Opera.

In the fall of 2015 Mancasola made her European debut at Komische Oper Berlin singing Olympia/Antonia/Giulietta in Les contes d'Hoffman, Pamina in Barrie Kosky's production of Die Zauberflöte, and Cleopatra in Giulio Cesare. In 2016 Mancasola joined the ensemble at Oper Frankfurt where she remained for three seasons, singing roles including Roxana in a new production of Król Roger, Gilda in Rigoletto, Pamina in The Magic Flute, Musetta in La bohème, Susanna in Le nozze di Figaro, and the Italian Singer in Capriccio.

Mancasola made her debut at English National Opera in 2017 as Gilda in the Sir Jonathan Miller production of Rigoletto and her debut at Oper Köln as the title role of Manon in 2018.

Mancasola has appeared with several orchestras including San Francisco Symphony, Philadelphia Orchestra, Orchestra Sinfonica Nazionale RAI, Baltimore Symphony Orchestra, Santa Fe Symphony Orchestra, Eugene Symphony, Sun Valley Symphony, and the Lexington Philharmonic Orchestra.

In August 2019, she was awarded a Herald Angel Award for her performance as Bess in Missy Mazzoli and Royce Vavrek's opera Breaking the Waves at the Edinburgh International Festival.

== Awards ==
- 2013 Metropolitan Opera National Council Audition Winner
- 2013 Gerda Lissner Foundation Competition Top Prize
- 2013 Houston Grand Opera Eleanor McCollum Competition, Audience Favorite and Second Prize
- 2013 Loren L Zachary National Vocal Competition First Prize
- 2016 Mabel Dorn Reeder Foundation Prize
- Judith Raskin Memorial Award for Singers presented by Santa Fe Opera
- Margot Bos Standler Scholarship at the Oberlin Conservatory of Music
