= Daniel Okulitch =

Canadian bass-baritone (born 1976)

Daniel Okulitch (born January 30, 1976) is a Canadian bass-baritone. He first came to attention on Broadway as Schaunard in Baz Luhrmann's production of La bohème in 2002/03 – a role he repeated when the production traveled to Los Angeles the following year, for which he received the Ovation Award for Best Ensemble Performance from the Los Angeles Stage Alliance. He has since begun an international career with opera companies and orchestras throughout Europe and North America, and is admired for both his singing and powerful stage presence. He is sought after for many contemporary operas and world premieres, as well as the roles of Mozart, including Figaro and Don Giovanni.

== Education and early career ==
Okulitch was born in Ottawa, Ontario, and was raised in Calgary, Alberta, where he had his operatic debut at the age of 12 while still a boy soprano in the role of Amahl in Amahl and the Night Visitors with Calgary Opera, followed by one of the 3 spirits in The Magic Flute. He continued to perform throughout his teens, and at age 19 transferred to the Oberlin Conservatory of Music to study with acclaimed pedagogue Richard Miller, where he gained a Bachelor of Music and a Masters in Opera Theater. He then continued his education at the Cincinnati College Conservatory of Music, under the tutelage of William McGraw. During these years he apprenticed with the Des Moines Metro Opera, the Cincinnati Opera, and in the San Francisco Opera Merola Program.

In 2002, Okulitch was cast as Schaunard in the Baz Luhrmann production of Puccini's La bohème, which premiered at the Curran Theatre in San Francisco, and performed on Broadway for 228 performances.

== Career ==
Okulitch is an interpreter of Mozart roles, most notably Don Giovanni, Almaviva and Figaro, which he has performed at New York City Opera, Teatro Colón, Los Angeles Opera, Santa Fe Opera, Palm Beach Opera, Opera Warsaw, Vancouver Opera, Dallas Opera, Portland Opera, Michigan Opera Theater, Hawaii Opera, Manitoba Opera, Lyric Opera Kansas City, and the Milwaukee Symphony. Okulitch has also created leading roles in contemporary opera, most notably the roles of Ennis del Mar in Charles Wuorinen's Brokeback Mountain at Teatro Real in Madrid, Seth Brundle in Howard Shore's The Fly at the Théâtre du Châtelet in Paris and at Los Angeles Opera, Willy Wonka in Peter Ash's The Golden Ticket at Opera Theatre of St. Louis and Atlanta Opera, and Herman Broder in Ben Moore's Enemies, A Love Story at Palm Beach Opera.

Okulitch's career first garnered national attention in the role of Schaunard in the original cast of Baz Luhrmann's Tony Award-winning Broadway production of La bohème. Other career highlights include his Teatro alla Scala debut as Theseus in Britten's A Midsummer Night's Dream, his Washington National Opera debut in the role of Swallow in Peter Grimes which he also performed at La Scala, and the role of Creonte in Medee with Opera Genève, the role of LBJ in the world premiere of JFK with Fort Worth Opera, and General Groves in Dr. Atomic with the Santa Fe Opera.

In March 2011, he released his first solo album, The New American Art Song, featuring world premiere songs by Ricky Ian Gordon, Jake Heggie, Lowell Liebermann and Glen Roven who all accompany Okulitch on piano. Simultaneous with the record release, the songs were performed in a concert at Carnegie Hall, again with the composers accompanying (except Heggie).

In 2016, Okulitch premiered the role of Lyndon B. Johnson in David T. Little and Royce Vavrek's JFK at Fort Worth Opera. He reprised this performance for Opéra de Montréal in January 2018.

== Awards ==
Okulitch is the recipient of numerous awards and prizes, including first prize from the George London Foundation in 2004, a grant from the Sullivan Foundation 2004, 2nd prize from the Licia Albanese-Puccini Foundation Competition, first prize from the Joyce Dutka Arts Foundation in 2004, a grant from the Singers Development Fund in 2003, 5th prize in the Palm Beach Opera Vocal Competition in 2002, and was a regional finalist in the Metropolitan Opera Auditions in 2000 and 2001. He is a 2006 and 2008 recipient of a Canada Council Grant for Professional Musicians and received the Andrew White Memorial Award and a Corbett Award while a student at the Cincinnati Conservatory of Music.

== Recordings ==
- Baz Luhrmann's La bohème (Highlights from the 2002 original Broadway cast) DreamWorks 2002
- Le roi Arthus (Ernest Chausson) Telarc 2005
- Frau Margot Thomas Pasatieri Albany Records 2007
- The New American Art Song, GPR Records (2011)
