= Lincoln the Mystic =

Sculpture by James Earle Fraser

Coordinates: 40.724640°N 74.080939°W

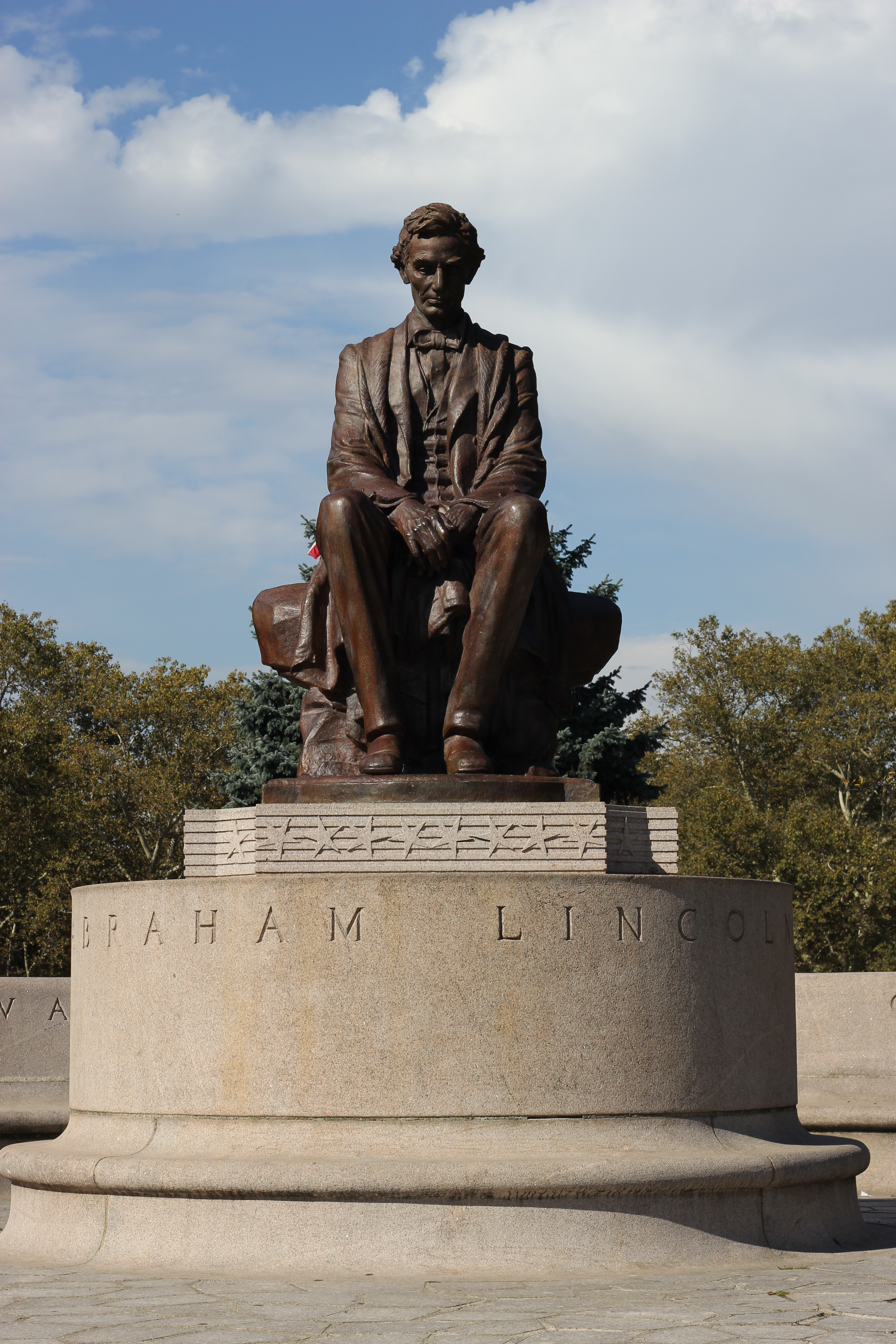
- Artist: James Earle Fraser
- Year: 1929
- Type: Bronze
- Dimensions: 3.0 m × 3.7 m × 1.8 m (10 ft × 12 ft × 6 ft)
- Location: Jersey City, New Jersey
- Owner: City of Jersey City, Department of Parks

Lincoln the Mystic, also known as the Abraham Lincoln Memorial, is a bronze statue by James Earle Fraser. It is located at Lincoln Park in Jersey City, New Jersey, near the beginning of the Lincoln Highway.

A full size bronze replica stands in front of the Maxwell School of Citizenship and Public Affairs at Syracuse University.

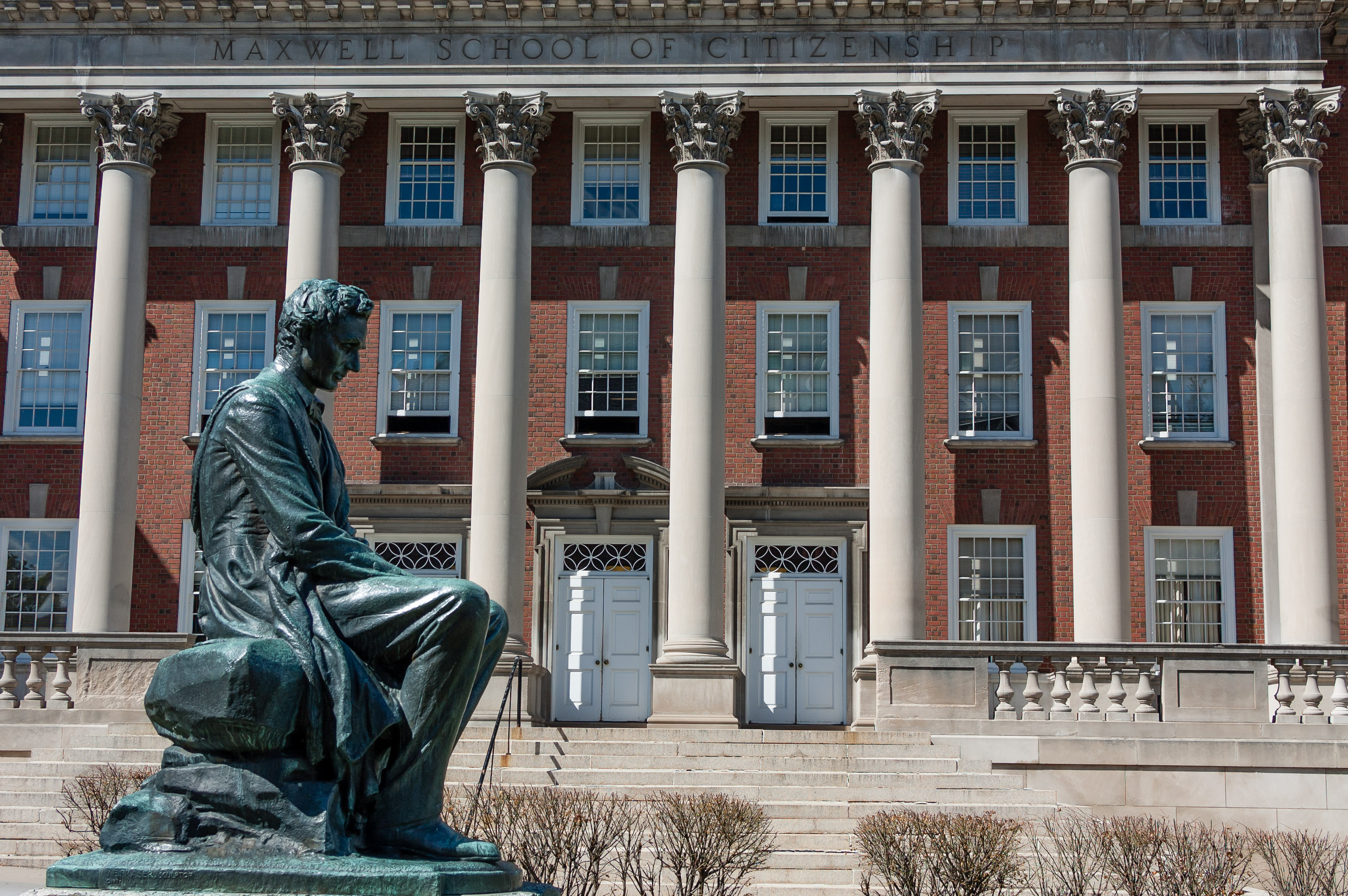
Abraham Lincoln Statue at Maxwell School, Syracuse University, 2012

== History ==
The sculpture cost $75,000, which was raised by popular subscription. The Lincoln Association of Jersey City commissioned Fraser to design and build the park memorial, which was dedicated on June 14, 1930. The association was also influential in the renaming of West Side Park for President Abraham Lincoln.

The inscription reads:

(On sculpture near base, raised letters:)
J. E. FRASER. SCULPTOR
(copyright symbol) 1929
(Around base:)
MDCCCLXV . MDCCCIX
(Around base, incised letters:)
ABRAHAM LINCOLN S. Kunst FDRY NYC signed Founder's mark appears.

The wall behind the sculpture bears the inscription:
WITH MALICE TOWARD NONE AND CHARITY FOR ALL.
On one side of wall:
THAT GOVERNMENT OF THE PEOPLE
BY THE PEOPLE FOR THE PEOPLE
SHALL NOT PERISH FROM THE EARTH.
On other side of wall:
LET US HAVE FAITH THAT RIGHT MAKES MIGHT
AND IN THAT FAITH LET US TO THE END
DARE TO DO OUR DUTY AS WE UNDERSTAND IT.

== See also ==
- Route of the Lincoln Highway
- Seated Lincoln
- Lincoln in the Bardo
- List of statues of Abraham Lincoln
- List of public art in Jersey City, New Jersey
- List of sculptures of presidents of the United States
