= Kiera Duffy =

American opera singer

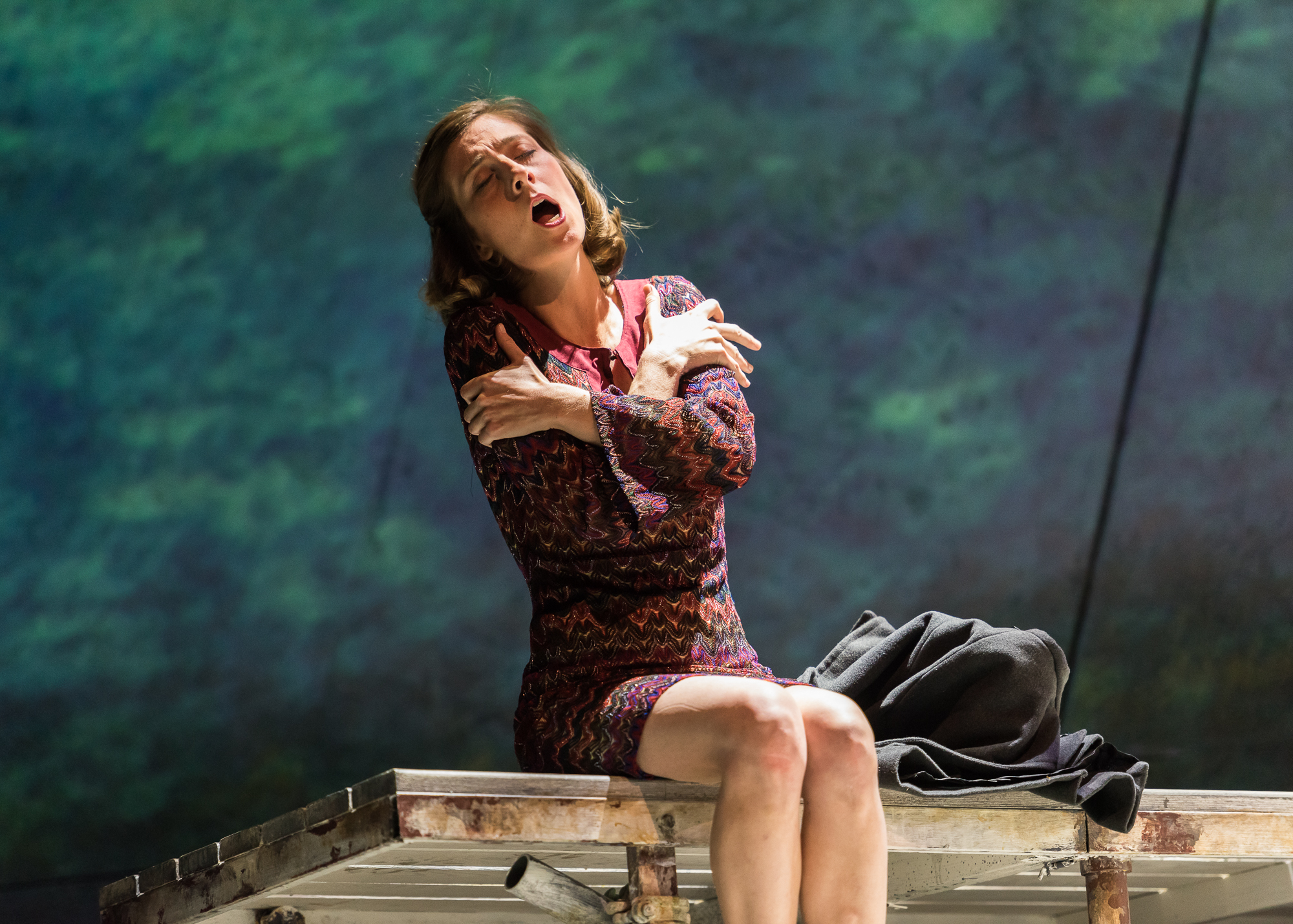
Duffy appearing in the Opera Philadelphia production of Breaking the Waves in 2016

Kiera Duffy (born 1979) is an American opera singer born in Philadelphia. A soprano, Duffy is also an accomplished pianist. She has earned bachelor's and master's degrees from Westminster Choir College.

== Education ==
When Duffy learned that Westminster Choir College's program in choral conducting was not available to undergraduates, she began to study vocal performance under professor Laura Brooks Rice, who became her mentor and continued as her voice coach after college. Duffy graduated in 2003 with a Master of Music degree in voice performance and pedagogy. She now studies with Edith Bers.

== Career ==
Duffy has appeared with the New York Philharmonic, Los Angeles Philharmonic, Toledo Opera, Atlanta Symphony Orchestra, Pacific Symphony Orchestra, Mormon Tabernacle Choir, Utah Symphony, and Opera Theatre of St. Louis, Metropolitan Opera, among others.

She has sung at the Tanglewood Music Festival as Despina in Cosi fan tutte by Mozart, and as Tebaldo in Don Carlo by Verdi, both with conductor James Levine. She has also appeared at the Spoleto Festival USA, the Wexford Opera Festival, and with the Chicago Symphony Orchestra's 'Beyond the Score' production of Schoenberg's Pierrot lunaire.

Contemporary works in which Duffy has appeared include Neither by Morton Feldman at the Wien Modern festival, The Ghosts of Versailles by John Corigliano, and the American premiere of What Next? by Elliott Carter.

She has also recorded Strauss lieder with pianist Roger Vignoles.

In September 2016 she premiered the role of Bess in Missy Mazzoli and Royce Vavrek's opera Breaking the Waves. She received unanimous acclaim with Fred Plotkin of WQXR proclaiming her turn the "performance of the year." In 2024, Duffy reprised the role with Detroit Opera.

Duffy was previously the head of undergraduate voice studies at the University of Notre Dame, and is now an Associate Professor of Voice at the Eastman School of Music.

== Recognition ==
Duffy was a finalist in the 2007 Metropolitan Opera National Council Auditions. In 2008 she was the recipient of a Sullivan Foundation grant. She has also received recognition from the Young Concert Artists International Competition and the Philadelphia Orchestra Greenfield Competition.
