= Katharine Goeldner =

American singer

Katharine Goeldner (born Sigourney, Iowa) American mezzo-soprano singer. Goeldner earned a Bachelor's in Music from the University of Iowa in 1985, and Magister Diplom in German Lieder from the Mozarteum University of Salzburg. She has sung dozens of operatic roles with the Metropolitan Opera, the Opéra National de Lyon, the New York City Opera, Lyric Opera of Chicago, Santa Fe Opera, and numerous other houses around the world. She has performed a large symphonic and oratorio repertory with orchestras including the Vienna Symphony Orchestra, Berlin Symphony Orchestra, and Salzburg Mozarteum Orchestra, and given recitals in the Kennedy Center, Théâtre du Capitole in Toulouse, and many other venues.

Among the roles she's created are Jacqueline Onassis in the David T. Little / Royce Vavrek opera JFK (opera) for Fort Worth Opera, and Peggy Ophuls in Shalimar the Clown, by Jack Perla and Rajiv Joseph, based on the novel by Salman Rushdie, for Opera Theatre of St. Louis. Goeldner has sung much new music, and with flutist Amy Morris, co-founded the chamber trio The Prairie Song Project, which commissioned "Paradox," by the composer Peter Ash, with poetry by Willa Cather and "A Handful of Leaves," composed by Rory Boyle with texts by former Poet Laureate Ted Kooser.

A signature role is the Composer in the Richard Strauss opera Ariadne auf Naxos, which she has sung in Oviedo, Madrid, Salzburg, Toulouse, Lyon and at Paris's Châtelet.

At the Metropolitan Opera, Goeldner's roles have included Giovanna Seymour, (in Donizetti's Anna Bolena,), the Schoolboy in Lulu by Alban Berg, Cherubino (in Mozart's Le nozze di Figaro), Ascanio (in Berlioz's Benvenuto Cellini), Nicklausse (in Offenbach's The Tales of Hoffmann), Prince Orlofsky (in Johann Strauss Jr's Die Fledermaus), Stéphano (in Charles Gounod's Roméo et Juliette), and the Page in Richard Strauss's Salome. At the New York City Opera she appeared as Erika in Samuel Barber's Vanessa, Ruggiero in Handel's Alcina, Suzuki in Puccini's Madama Butterfly and in the title role of Bizet's Carmen, and was honored with New York City Opera's Betty Allen and Diva Awards.
