= Talise Trevigne =

American operatic soprano

Talise Trevigne (born September 20, 1974, Santa Clara, California) is an American operatic soprano.

Trevigne is known for her commitment to contemporary music, having premiered works by composers Jake Heggie and David T. Little. She sang the lead female role in Missy Mazzoli and Royce Vavrek's opera Proving Up at Opera Omaha and Miller Theatre in 2018.

In 2015 she received a Grammy nomination for Best Classical Solo Vocal Album for her recording of Christopher Rouse's Seeing; Kabir Padavali.

== Notable world premieres ==
- 2016 JFK (David T. Little and Royce Vavrek)
- 2016 It's a Wonderful Life (Jake Heggie and Gene Scheer)
