= The Woodsman (play) =

2012 play about the Tin Man

- Playbill from the 2016 Off-Broadway Production
- Written by: James Ortiz
- Based on: The Tin Woodman of Oz by L. Frank Baum
- Music by: Edward W. Hardy
- Lyrics by: Jay Adana

Premiere
- Place: Standard Toykraft, Brooklyn

The Woodsman is a 2012 American stage play written by James Ortiz with music composed by Edward W. Hardy and lyrics by Jay Adana. It focuses on the story of the Tin Woodman character from L. Frank Baum's series of books set in the fictional Land of Oz, notably Baum's 1918 book The Tin Woodman of Oz. The production employs live performers, puppets, music, and very few spoken words.

The play was conceived by Strangemen Theatre Company, originally created by James Ortiz & Diana Stahl and produced by Steven Laing & Jason Ralph.

The play has received critical praise, and won a 2016 Obie Award for Ortiz's puppet design. On May 29, 2016, the cast recording of the musical soundtrack was released worldwide. On September 2, 2016, a filmed performance of the work was broadcast by PBS stations, as part of the Theater Close-Up series produced by WNET in association with BroadwayHD.

== Plot ==
The play focuses on the story of Nick Chopper, a mortal woodsman who will eventually become the Tin Woodman in The Wonderful Wizard of Oz. In eastern section of the Land of Oz, Munchkin Country, the Munchkins live in fear of their master the Wicked Witch of the East. The Witch's rule has made everyone afraid to speak aloud – to that end, the play is almost entirely wordless, with the characters instead communicating through noise and mime. Two Munchkins brave the dangerous forest to try to find safety in Emerald City on the other side, but after finding a safe clearing decide to settle down in the woods instead. As they age, they give birth to Nick Chopper, who after their deaths inherits his father's practice as a woodsman and a locket belonging to his mother, along with their hope to eventually reach the Emerald City.

The Witch has in her captivity a Munchkin named Nimmie, the daughter of a Munchkin sorcerer, who is forced to serve as the Witch's servant. Sent into the woods to retrieve items for the Witch, Nimmie is ambushed by a vicious Kalidah creature, but is saved by Nick. The pair having never seen another Munchkin, they quickly grow intrigued by each other: Nick shows off his skills with his axe and teaches Nimmie how to use it. They gradually fall for each other as Nick gifts Nimmie his mother's locket, but Nimmie recalls her mission and returns to the Witch. However, the Witch notices the locket and attempts to take it from Nimmie: Nimmie uses her latent powers of sorcery as well as her bravery she learned from Nick to fight the Witch into submission and escape. She reunites with Nick and the two become lovers, planning to build a home and family together.

However, the Witch tracks down Nick and Nimmie while they are asleep and places a curse on his axe which causes him to lose pieces of himself every time he uses it. A group of Winkies, the Tinsmiths, help him by replacing each of his severed limbs with metal parts. Nimmie tries to stop Nick from continuing to use the axe, but he is too devoted to building their future together: eventually, the axe completely tears him to pieces. Nimmie recovers his parts and pleads with the Winkies for help, breaking her silence in the process. The Winkies build Nick a new body out of tin, and Nimmie uses her powers to revive him. However, realizing he lacks a heart and feeling he can no longer love Nimmie, Nick chooses to leave her. The Witch invites a devastated Nimmie to return to her, but Nimmie rejects her and vanishes into the woods alone. In the play's only song with lyrics, "Rusting Tin Man", the Woodsman devotes his existence to chopping wood in the field as the spirits of his parents sadly watch on. Eventually, his memories of Nimmie fade as he rusts until he is completely unable to move.

Some time later, the Witch is crushed when a house falls from the sky, and a girl emerges, venturing into Oz.

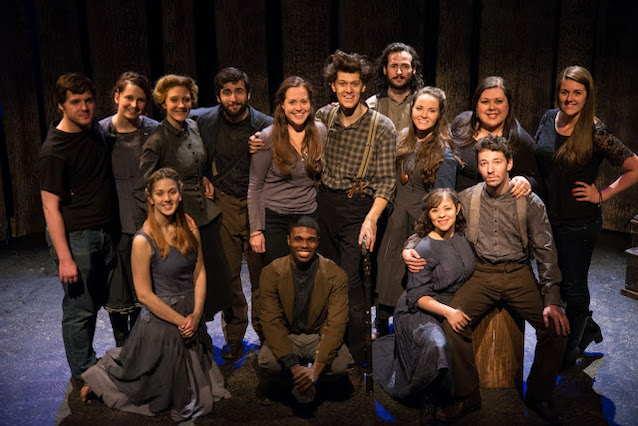
The Woodsman Cast and Crew

== Production ==
The play was initially conceived by Strangemen & Co., an ensemble theatre company co-founded by James Ortiz, Frank Winters, and Jason Ralph, who met at the Purchase College acting conservatory.

The show debuted in 2012 at Standard ToyKraft in Brooklyn, followed by a 2013 run at the Ars Nova ANT Fest. It has been produced Off-Broadway at 59E59 Theaters in 2014 and 2015, and at New World Stages in 2016. In 2019, a limited run was produced at the Bluebarn Theatre in Omaha, Nebraska, directed by Ortiz and Karpen with a new cast. The Blue Barn production triggered a lawsuit filed by composer Edward W. Hardy, who alleged that his music constituted a separate work and therefore required his permission and compensation. Hardy subsequently dropped the lawsuit.

== Reception ==
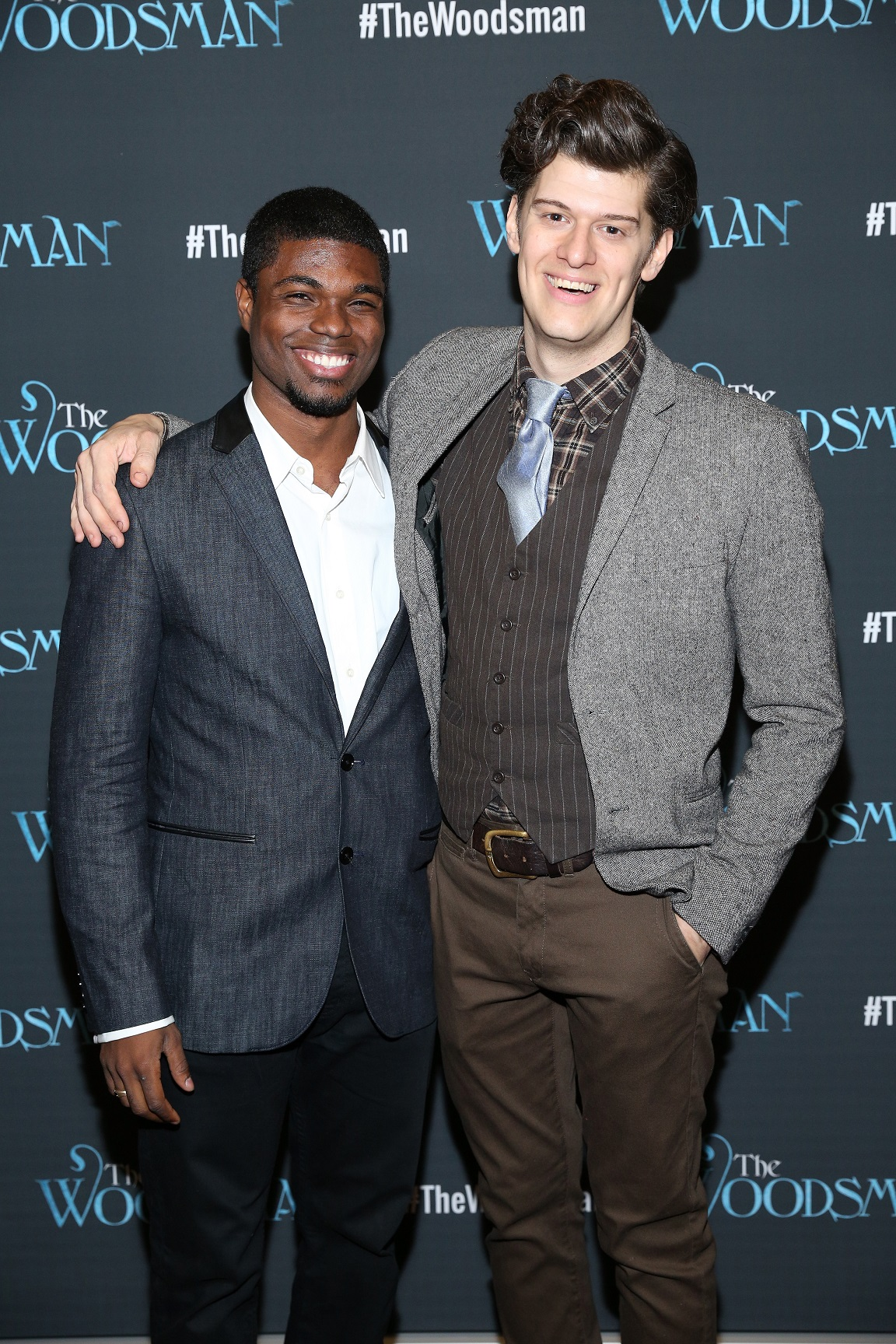
Hardy and Ortiz on opening night of The Woodsman at New World Stages in 2016.

New York Times critic Laura Collins-Hughes praised the 2015 production, especially for Hardy's music and for Ortiz's puppet design, while noting that the visual, nonverbal storytelling of the hour-long production was not always clear to the audience. Collins-Hughes found the 2016 production to be less rushed and "more assured", with an increased "visual lushness", but felt that "mechanics get in the way of fantasy" during part of the show. Variety's Marilyn Stasio cited the production's "haunting beauty", while Frank Scheck of The Hollywood Reporter described the "charming and disturbing", minimalist production as the antithesis of Wicked, the massively successful big-budget Oz-based musical playing a block away.
