= Steven Osgood =

American classical music conductor

Steven Osgood is an American classical music conductor.

He is known for his commitment to new operatic works, having conducted many world premieres including Missy Mazzoli and Royce Vavrek's Breaking the Waves, David T. Little and Royce Vavrek's JFK and Laura Kaminsky, Mark Campbell and Kimberly Reed's As One.

He is the General and Artistic Director of the Chautauqua Opera Company, and the Artistic Director of American Opera Projects' Composers and the Voice program.

== Notable World Premieres ==
- 2016 Breaking the Waves (Missy Mazzoli and Royce Vavrek)
- 2016 JFK (David T. Little and Royce Vavrek)
- 2015 The Scarlet Ibis (Stefan Weisman and David Cote)
- 2014 As One (Laura Kaminsky, Mark Campbell and Kimberly Reed)
- 2014 Thumbprint (Kamala Sankaram and Susan Yankowitz)
- 2012 Song from the Uproar (Missy Mazzoli and Royce Vavrek)
- 2012 Patience and Sarah (Paula Kimper and Wende Persons)
