= Lincoln in the Bardo =

2017 book by George Saunders

- First hardcover edition
- Author: George Saunders
- Language: English
- Genre: Historical fiction, magical realism, experimental fiction
- Publisher: Random House
- Publication date: February 14, 2017
- Publication place: United States
- Media type: Print (hardcover and paperback)
- Pages: 368
- ISBN: 978-0-8129-9534-3
- OCLC: 971025602

Lincoln in the Bardo is a 2017 experimental novel by American writer George Saunders. It is Saunders's first full-length novel and was The New York Times hardcover fiction bestseller for the week of March 5, 2017.

The novel takes place during and after the death of Abraham Lincoln's son William Wallace "Willie" Lincoln and deals with the president's grief at his loss. The bulk of the novel, which takes place over the course of a single evening, is set in the bardo—an intermediate space between life and rebirth.

Lincoln in the Bardo received critical acclaim and won the 2017 Booker Prize.

== Conception and research ==
=== Background ===
The novel was inspired by a story Saunders's wife's cousin told him about how Lincoln visited his son Willie's crypt at Oak Hill Cemetery in Georgetown on several occasions to hold the body, a story that seems to be verified by contemporary newspaper accounts. In March 2017, Saunders provided more detail on the background and conception of his novel:

Many years ago, during a visit to Washington DC, my wife's cousin pointed out to us a crypt on a hill and mentioned that, in 1862, while Abraham Lincoln was president, his beloved son, Willie, died, and was temporarily interred in that crypt, and that the grief-stricken Lincoln had, according to the newspapers of the day, entered the crypt "on several occasions" to hold the boy's body. An image spontaneously leapt into my mind—a melding of the Lincoln Memorial and the Pietà. I carried that image around for the next 20-odd years, too scared to try something that seemed so profound, and then finally, in 2012, noticing that I wasn't getting any younger, not wanting to be the guy whose own gravestone would read "Afraid to Embark on Scary Artistic Project He Desperately Longed to Attempt", decided to take a run at it, in exploratory fashion, no commitments. My novel, Lincoln in the Bardo, is the result of that attempt [...].

Without giving anything away, let me say this: I made a bunch of ghosts. They were sort of cynical; they were stuck in this realm, called the bardo (from the Tibetan notion of a sort of transitional purgatory between rebirths), stuck because they'd been unhappy or unsatisfied in life. The greatest part of their penance is that they feel utterly inessential—incapable of influencing the living.

— George Saunders (2017)

Saunders first announced the novel in a 2015 New York Times interview with the novelist Jennifer Egan, revealing that it would have a "supernatural element" while remaining "ostensibly historical". The novel's title was announced in a conversation between Saunders and Susan Sarandon in Interview magazine, in April 2016. That same month, a description of the book was posted on the Random House website.

=== Development ===
Saunders did not originally intend to write a novel (and had avoided doing so in the past), but the story of Lincoln cradling his son's body stayed with him, and he eventually decided to write about it. The novel began as a single section, and was fleshed out over time.

To produce the book, Saunders conducted extensive research on Lincoln and the American Civil War, consulting, among other books, Edmund Wilson's Patriotic Gore: Studies in the literature of the American Civil War (1962). Saunders rearranged historical sources to get at the "necessary historical facts", and included excerpts from them in the novel. Many of these sources are cited in the book, along with some fictional ones.

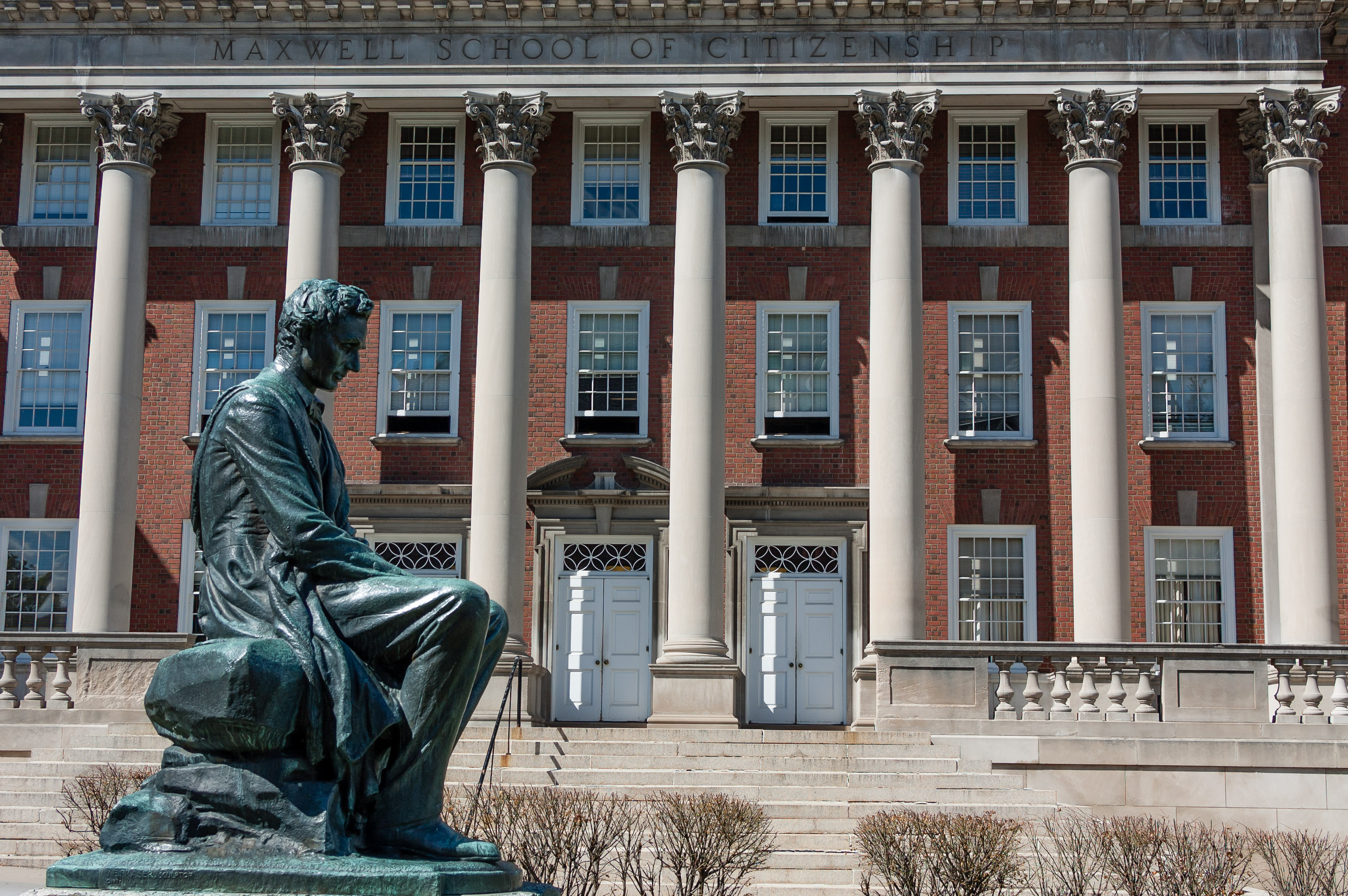
Lincoln the Mystic, an Abraham Lincoln statue near the Maxwell School of Syracuse University

In a The New Yorker Radio Hour podcast with David Remnick, Saunders described how a melancholic Lincoln the Mystic statue, sculpted by James Earle Fraser, propelled him through the novel. The statue is in front of his office at Syracuse University, near the Tolley Hall.

Saunders has said that he was "scared to write this book". He worried about his ability to portray Lincoln, but decided that limiting his characterization to a single night made the writing process "not easy, but easier, because I knew just where he was in his trajectory as president". Given that his other work is generally set in the present, Saunders compared writing a novel set in 1862 to "running with leg weights" because he "couldn't necessarily do the voices that I would naturally create".

== Setting ==
Much of the novel takes place in the bardo, a Tibetan Buddhist term for the "intermediate state" between death and reincarnation when the consciousness is not connected to a body. In Saunders's conception, the "ghosts" that inhabit the bardo are "disfigured by desires they failed to act upon while alive" and are threatened by permanent entrapment in the liminal space. They are unaware that they have died, referring to the space as their "hospital-yard" and to their coffins as "sick-boxes".

Saunders has said that, while he named the setting after Tibetan tradition, he incorporated elements of the Christian and Egyptian afterlives, so as not to be "too literal." The selection of the term "bardo", he said, was "partly to help the reader not to bring too many preconceptions to it... in a book about the afterlife, it's good to destabilize all of the existing beliefs as much as you can."

== Adaptations ==
=== Audiobook ===
Saunders has typically recorded his stories' audiobook adaptations himself, but given this novel's cast of 166 characters, he did not feel he could be the sole voice actor. His friend Nick Offerman agreed early in the production process to take a role, as did Offerman's wife, Megan Mullally. The two then recruited Don Cheadle, Julianne Moore, Susan Sarandon, and Rainn Wilson. Non-celebrities with parts include Saunders's wife, his children, and various friends. Other notable narrators include Carrie Brownstein, Kat Dennings, Lena Dunham, Bill Hader, Miranda July, Mary Karr, Keegan-Michael Key, David Sedaris, Ben Stiller, Jeffrey Tambor, Jeff Tweedy, Bradley Whitford, and Patrick Wilson.

=== Films ===
Mullally and Offerman purchased the rights to produce a film version of the novel five weeks after it was released. In 2017, Graham Sack wrote and directed a short film adaptation of the book.

As of 2025, another film adaptation is being produced by Duke Johnson, featuring Andre Holland. Tom Hanks is set to play Lincoln while producing through his Playtone company. Willem Dafoe, Jonathan Bailey, Peter Dinklage, Meryl Streep, Colman Domingo, Bill Hader, Alanah Bloor, and Tom Waits have also joined the cast.

=== Opera ===
The Metropolitan Opera commissioned Missy Mazzoli and Royce Vavrek to adapt the book into an opera, which premiered in October 2026.

== Reception ==
=== Sales ===
The novel was listed as a bestseller in the United States by The New York Times and USA Today.

=== Critical response ===
In The New York Times, novelist Colson Whitehead called the book "a luminous feat of generosity and humanism". Time magazine listed it as one of its top ten novels of 2017, and Paste ranked it the fifth-best novel of the 2010s. In 2024, The New York Times named it the 18th-best book of the 21st century.

The novel has been compared to Edgar Lee Masters's poetry collection Spoon River Anthology. Tim Martin, writing for Literary Review, compared its "babble of American voices", some from primary sources and some expertly fabricated, to the last act of Thornton Wilder's play Our Town.

=== Accolades ===
The novel won the 2017 Booker Prize. Its audiobook won the 2018 Audie Award for Audiobook of the Year.

== Translations ==
The novel has been translated into Polish by Michał Kłobukowski and published by Znak in 2018. In Brazil, it was translated into Portuguese by Jorio Dauster and published by Companhia das Letras in 2018. In Iran, it was translated into Persian by Naeime Khalesi and published by Jomhooripub in 2018. It was translated into Greek by Giorgos-Ikaros Babasakis and published by Ikaros in 2017. A Swedish translation (by Niclas Nilsson) was published by Albert Bonniers Förlag in 2018. A Croatian translation was released in 2018 by Vuković & Runjić, translated by Maja Šoljan.
