= Angry People in Local Newspapers =

British blog

Angry People in Local Newspapers is a website and a series of social media accounts.

== History ==
Angry People in Local Newspapers was started by Alistair Coleman, a journalist at the BBC. It was started by Coleman as a blog after he read a story with the headline "Naked neighbour put me off men and sausages". The primary outlet for Angry People in Local Newspapers was later changed to a Facebook page. A book, titled Angry People in Local Newspapers: The break-out stars of 2018, was published in 2018.

== Content ==
Angry People in Local Newspapers shares articles from local newspapers, including reader's letters. It is also known for the cliched photographs it shares.
