= Nathalie Joachim =

Haitian-American musician

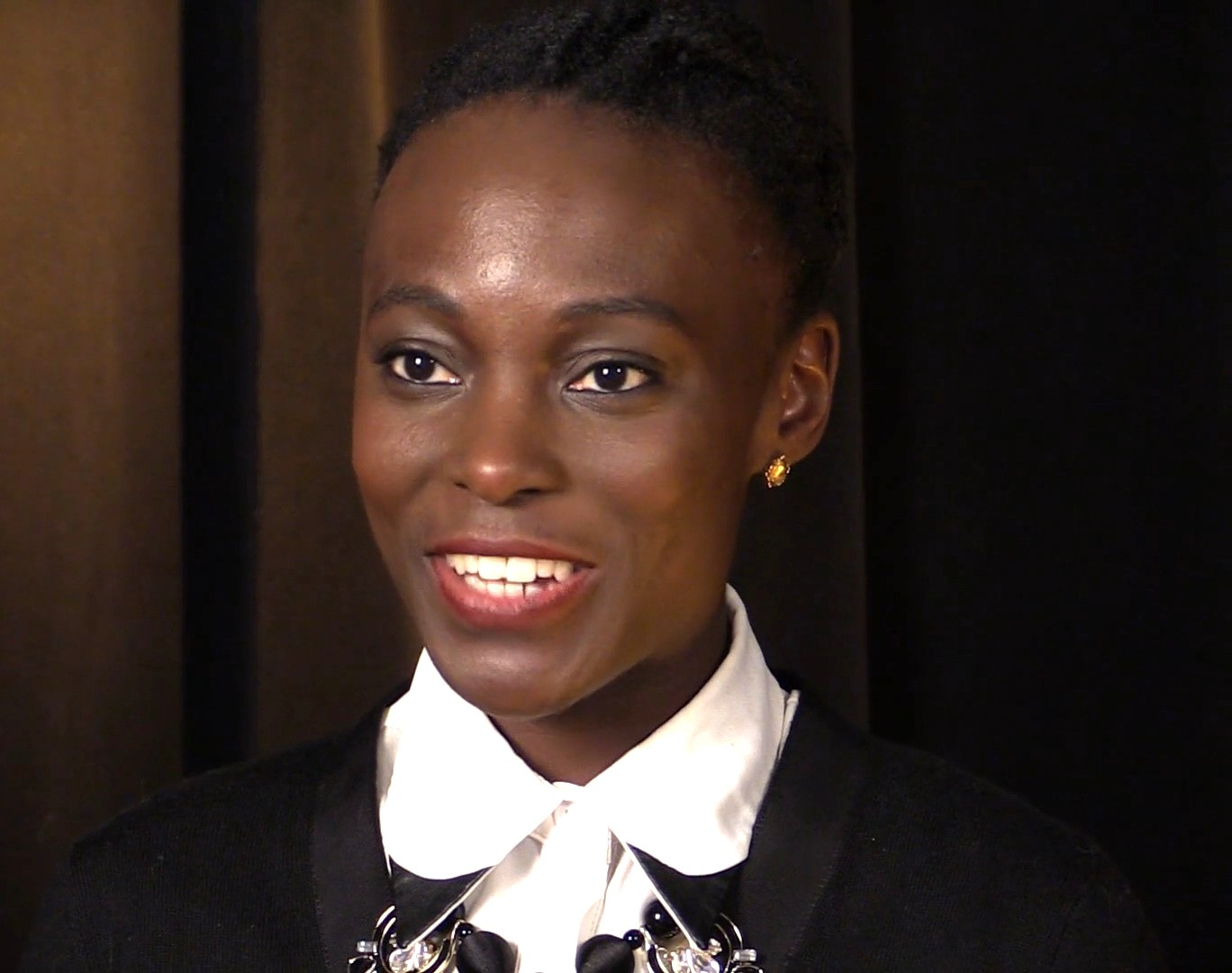
- Joachim in 2018

Background information
- Born: Nathalie Joachim; Brooklyn, New York, U.S.
- Genres: Indie rock; pop; classical
- Occupations: Singer; flautist; composer
- Instruments: Vocals; flute
- Years active: 2005–present

Nathalie Joachim is an American vocalist, flautist, and composer born in Brooklyn, New York. She is a Grammy-nominated artist whose music spans a broad range of genres, including indie-rock, pop, and classical. Some of her works include Discourse, "Land Bridge", and Fanm d’Ayiti.

Joachim attended The Juilliard School and later pursued graduate studies in audio production and sound design at The New School. She is the co-founder of an urban pop art flute duo called Flutronix and also served as former flutist of Eighth Blackbird, a Chicago-based chamber ensemble. She is currently touring her most recent work Fanm d’Ayiti. When she is not touring, Joachim is involved with a variety of different musical education programs; she is the Director of Contemporary Chamber Music at the Perlman Music Program and holds other faculty positions at Princeton University and the University of Hartford, among other institutions.

== Early years and education ==
Joachim was involved in music early on in her life. She began her journey into music by playing the piano when she was four years old. At nine years old she began to play the flute. She began participating in the Juilliard School's music advancement program when she was 10 years old and was later accepted into its pre-college division. Following her involvement in the pre-college division, Joachim was admitted into and later graduated from Juilliard’s college division. In addition to the Juilliard School, Joachim credits Tower Records for generating her interest in hip-hop, jazz, and electronic music.

== Works ==
=== "Land Bridge" ===
"Land Bridge" (2016) is a full-length visual and musical composition realized in collaboration with Canadian choreographer Helen Simoneau. Narrated through the lens of caribou, the work span themes of identity, heritage, and assimilation. Joachim utilizes both acoustic and electronic sounds in the score, which are complemented by human voice. "Land Bridge" premiered in Winston-Salem, NC, in March 2016.

=== Discourse ===
Discourse is a joint-production between Joachim and fellow co-founder of Flutronix, Allison Loggins-Hull. The work is the focus of Joachim and Loggins-Hull’s two-year residency at Carolina Performing Arts, which began in the summer of 2018. In an interview with WUNC 91.5, Joachim explained that Discourse is an evening-length performance that strives to engage the community through social change in response to the fears and concerns over the deepening divides within the United States. Joachim further states that the work "invites people to engage in conversation with one another and to connect with each other’s personal narratives" via interviews with the local community at Chapel Hill, NC, which will ultimately be blended into a final performance. Discourse was originally planned to be premiered in spring 2020 but is currently scheduled for spring 2021 due to the COVID-19 pandemic.

=== Fanm d'Ayiti ===
Fanm d’Ayiti (2019) is an evening-length composition for flute, string quartet, electronics, and voice. It consists of 11 tracks and is also Joachim’s first featured solo album. The piece was inspired by a visit back to Haiti in 2015, the first time Joachim had returned since the passing of her maternal grandmother. Upon returning, Joachim was reminded by the widespread prevalence of the voices of Haitian women in the landscape and countryside, in particular. In an interview with the Recording Academy, Joachim explained that her grandmother encouraged her to use her voice both as a method of singing and storytelling. She further stated that the loss of her grandmother’s voice led her to consider the presence of female artists in Haiti’s traditionally male-dominated popular music scene.

Fanm d’Ayiti integrates oral-history testimony throughout the songs. Joachim includes spoken-word excerpts from four key individuals, which include 1) Ipheta Fortuma, 2) Emerante de Pradines (also known as Emerante Morse), 3) Toto Bissainthe, and 4) Carole Demesmin. Ipheta Fortuma was Joachim’s maternal grandmother, while the other three individuals included on the album are well-known Haitian female singers. Moreover, the album features an all-girls choir from the hometown of Joachim’s family. Each of the eleven tracks are sung in kreyòl.

Beyond the album itself, Fanm d'Ayiti constitutes an ethnographic research undertaking. Joachim noted that the work progressed through her conversations with family members and others belonging to the Haitian community. She began the project by asking her parents to recall popular musicians that were female. Utilizing this list as a starting point, she then pursued further research of these artists and met with them if they were alive. Joachim shared with the Recording Academy, "I found such a kinship in their stories as artists, and specifically female artists, really trying to make it in a field where women's voices are ever-present but really under-represented."

== On being Haitian-American ==
Though Joachim was born and raised in Brooklyn, New York, she has ties with the Haitian community, as her family is originally from a rural village in Haiti called Dantan. Fanm d’Ayiti marks the first major project in which Joachim’s Haitian roots are explored through her music; while discussing the fieldwork research she conducted for the composition, Joachim shared, "In some way each woman opened the door for the next and opened a door for me. I found this synergy between my story as an American-born woman feel deeply connected to this heritage and their voices. Each of those conversations was very emotional, to see how deeply they care about our history, how passionate they are for continuing to use their voices to lift each other up."

Commenting on her family’s response to her musical endeavors, Joachim noted that while her parents were supportive, they were initially puzzled by it, as "most Haitian parents really want their children to become nurses, doctors, lawyers or teachers, something practical." Joachim further added that, according to her parents, her pursuit of music was not necessarily unique since music played a significant role in how Haitians engaged with each other culturally in general; however, by involving her family in her research for Fanm d’Ayiti, Joachim highlighted how the project allowed her parents to understand her devoted interest in music.

== Performances and musical involvement ==
Joachim is a musical educator who holds several faculty positions at a number of universities, including Princeton University, the Hartt School at the University of Hartford, Banff Centre for Arts and Creativity, and Bang on a Can Summer Festival. She is also the Director of Contemporary Music at the Perlman Music Program and is on the Board of Trustees for the Kaufman Music Center. In addition to her involvement at these institutions, Joachim performs as a flutist in the urban-pop flute duo called Flutronix. She has also performed as a flutist in the chamber-orchestra group Eighth Blackbird.

=== Flutronix ===
Joachim co-founded Flutronix with fellow Brooklyn-native Allison Loggins-Hull. Joachim and Loggins-Hull first interacted with each other via MySpace, in which Joachim discovered that she and Loggins-Hull were both flutists of similar age living in Brooklyn. In an interview with WUNC 91.5, Joachim further explained that after she stumbled upon Loggins-Hull's myspace profile and listened to some of her music, she noticed that they were interested in the same types of genres. After interacting with each other on myspace, they realized that they lived within blocks of each other. On recounting her first meeting with Loggins-Hull back in 2008, Joachim shared "I just walked on over to her house and we spent the afternoon in her living room just talking to each other about our lives… And I think we were both finding that we had lived these parallel lives and they were just intersecting at precisely the right moment."

After this initial encounter in 2008, Flutronix released a debut album in 2010. With respect to non-classical musical influences, Joachim and Loggins-Hull cite a range of artists, including jazz flutist Hubert Laws, Steve Reich, Radiohead, and Kanye West. Flutronix has also collaborated with both classical and non-classical artists and groups, including hip-hop producer Ski Beatz, electronic musician Dan Deacon, and the International Contemporary Ensemble.

=== Eighth Blackbird ===
Eighth Blackbird is a Chicago-based sextet that originated as a group of six students from the Oberlin Conservatory. The group was founded in 1996 and continues under the direction of founding members Matthew Duvall and Lisa Kaplan. Over the course of more than two decades, the chamber ensemble has won four Grammy Awards for Best Small Ensemble/Chamber Music Performance. Joachim auditioned for Eighth Blackbird in February 2015 and later was accepted into the chamber sextet as flutist in July of that year. When asked about participating in the chamber ensemble, Joachim stated, "At the time, I felt fulfilled as an educator through Juilliard’s Music Advancement Program and as a creator through Flutronix, but I found myself longing for a chamber music home. There is a connection that a chamber music setting provides that is truly unique, and for me is the real bread and butter of performance. Eighth Blackbird captures that like no other ensemble in my opinion, so I jumped at the chance." Joachim concluded her tenure with Eighth Blackbird at the end of 2019.

== Honours ==
Joachim received a Grammy nomination for Best World Music Album for her recent composition Fanm d’Ayiti. She was also listed as a 2020 United States Artists Fellow, which is an initiative aimed at providing financial support for artists. Some of Joachim’s most recent and prominent works include "Land Bridge", Discourse, and Fanm d’Ayiti.
