= Missy Mazzoli =

American composer and pianist (born 1980)

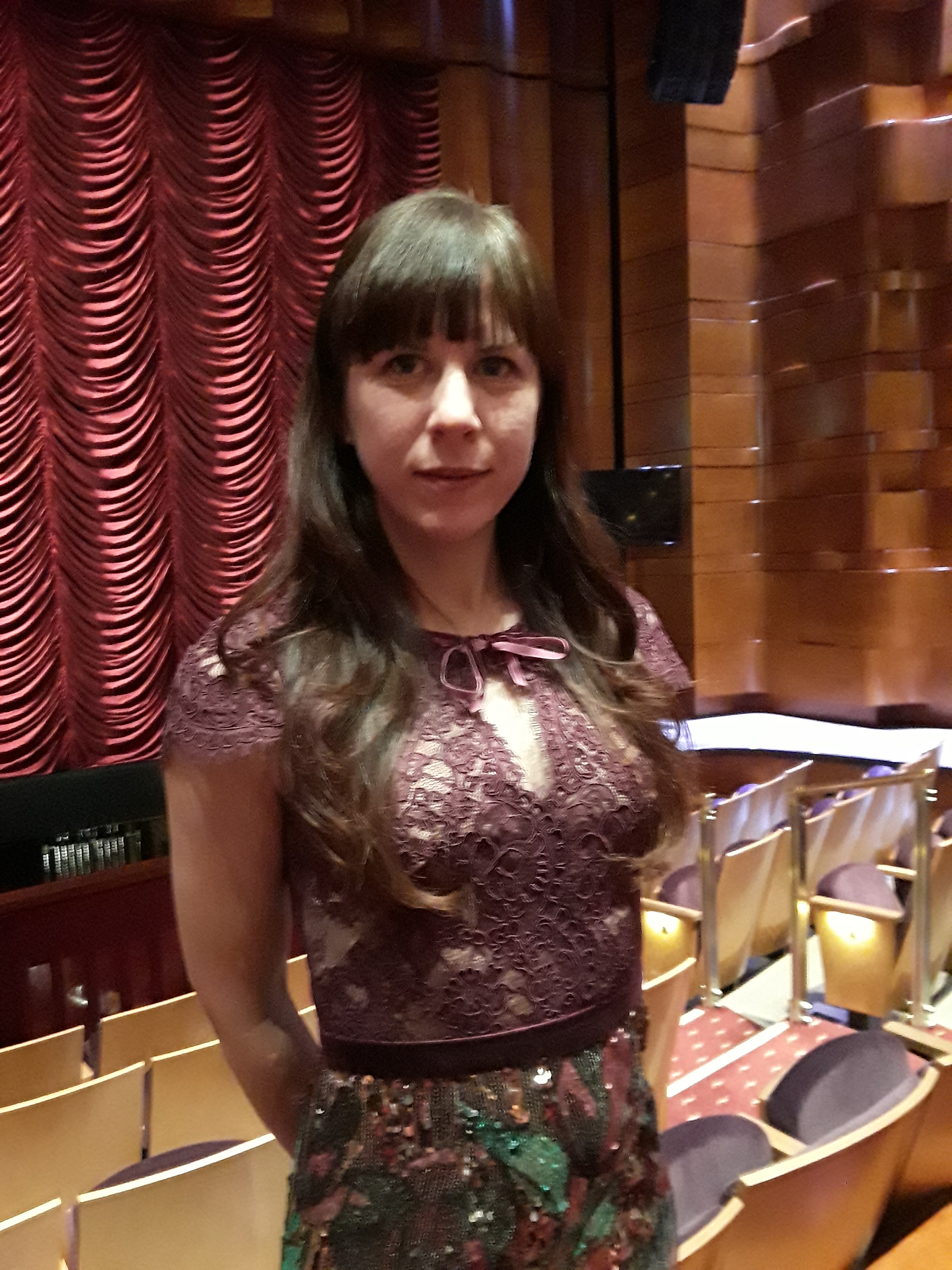
Missy Mazzoli after the premiere of her opera Proving Up at the Kennedy Center, 2018

Missy Mazzoli (born October 27, 1980) is an American composer and pianist who has received critical acclaim for her chamber, orchestral and operatic work. In 2018 she became one of the first two women to receive a commission from the Metropolitan Opera House. She is the founder and keyboardist for Victoire, an electro-acoustic band. From 2012 to 2015 she was composer-in-residence at Opera Philadelphia, in collaboration with Gotham Chamber Opera and Music-Theater Group. Mazzoli received a 2015 Foundation for Contemporary Arts Grants to Artists Award, a Fulbright Grant to the Netherlands, and has been nominated for three Grammy Awards for Best Classical Composition. In 2018, Mazzoli was named for a two-season term as the Mead Composer-in-Residence with the Chicago Symphony Orchestra. Mazzoli is a professor of composition at Bard College. She previously taught at the Mannes College of Music. Mazzoli was named the Bragg Artist-in-Residence at Mount Allison University in Canada beginning in 2022. Her music is published by G. Schirmer.

== Education ==
Mazzoli was born in Lansdale, Pennsylvania and is a graduate of North Penn High School. She received a bachelor's degree from Boston University's College of Fine Arts, a master's degree from the Yale School of Music in 2006, and additionally studied at the Royal Conservatory of the Hague.

In 2006 Mazzoli taught composition in the music department of Yale University, and in 2013 was a guest lecturer at New York University. From 2007 to 2010 she was executive director of the MATA Festival in New York City.

== Concert works and recordings ==
From 2012 to 2015, Mazzoli was composer-in-residence with the Opera Philadelphia, Gotham Chamber Opera and Music Theatre-Group, and in 2011/12 was composer/educator in residence with the Albany Symphony.

Mazzoli has released three full-length albums of her music: Cathedral City, written for her band Victoire (2010); Song from the Uproar, the original cast recording of her first opera (2012); and Vespers for a New Dark Age (2015), a work for her band Victoire in collaboration with percussionist Glenn Kotche (of Wilco) and vocalists Martha Cluver, Melissa Hughes and Virginia Kelsey, Proving Up, the original cast recording of her third opera (2020), and Dark with Excessive Bright, a recording of her orchestral works with the Bergen Philharmonic and the Arctic Philharmonic (2023). Vespers for a New Dark Age was commissioned by Carnegie Hall and premiered there in February 2014. Dark with Excessive Bright was nominated for two Grammy Awards in 2024, for Best Classical Compendium and Best Classical Composition for the title track, a violin concerto.

== Operatic works ==
=== SALT ===
A 20-minute retelling of the story of Lot's wife for voice, cello and electronics, SALT was performed at the 2012 BAM Next Wave Festival in Brooklyn and at UNC Chapel Hill. Composed for cellist Maya Beiser and vocalist Helga Davis, SALT was directed by Robert Woodruff and includes text by Erin Cressida Wilson.

=== Song from the Uproar ===
Mazzoli's first opera, Song from the Uproar: The Lives and Deaths of Isabelle Eberhardt, based on the life of Swiss explorer and writer Isabelle Eberhardt, premiered at New York venue The Kitchen in March 2012. The piece was created in collaboration with librettist Royce Vavrek, filmmaker Stephen Taylor and director Gia Forakis. The Wall Street Journal called this work "powerful and new" and The New York Times said that "in the electric surge of Ms. Mazzoli's score you felt the joy, risk, and limitless potential of free spirits unbound."

On November 13, 2012, the original cast recording of Song from the Uproar was released on New Amsterdam Records. In October 2015 LA Opera presented the second full production as part of their "Off Grand" series at REDCAT.

=== Breaking the Waves ===
Mazzoli's opera Breaking the Waves, an adaptation of Lars von Trier's 1996 Cannes Grand Prix-winning film Breaking the Waves, with a libretto by Royce Vavrek, was commissioned by Opera Philadelphia and Beth Morrison Projects. The opera premiered in Philadelphia on September 22, 2016 gaining many positive reviews. Opera News wrote that "Breaking the Waves stands among the best 21st-century American operas yet produced.". Heidi Waleson in her review for The Wall Street Journal wrote: "Mr. Vavrek's spare, eloquent libretto leaves ample space for Ms. Mazzoli's music to create a complex portrait of Bess and her stark environment. … Ms. Mazzoli's score deftly balances trenchant arias with a kaleidoscopic orchestration whose layers and colors suggest Messiaen, Britten and Janáček but is finally all her own." The opera was nominated for the 2017 International Opera Award for Best World Premiere, and won the inaugural Music Critics Association of North America Award for Best New Opera in 2017. In 2019 Scottish Opera presented Breaking the Waves on a world tour beginning at the 2019 Edinburgh International Festival, in a new production directed by Tom Morris. This production was later produced at the Adelaide Festival and by Opéra Comique, Detroit Opera and Houston Grand Opera.

=== Proving Up ===
In 2018, Mazzoli premiered Proving Up, her third opera with librettist Royce Vavrek, an adaptation of Karen Russell's short story of the same title. The work was commissioned by Washington National Opera, Opera Omaha and Miller Theatre. and was written for baritone John Moore and Grammy-nominated soprano Talise Trevigne. The opera is a surreal commentary on the origins of the American Dream, as told through the story of homesteaders in the 1870s, and was called “harrowing…powerful…a true opera of our time” by the Washington Post and “brilliant” by Musical America. Proving Up has been produced at companies including Pittsburgh Opera, the Juilliard School, Rice University, the University of Texas at Austin, San Francisco Conservatory of Music, University of Michigan, Boston University, and the Muffled Voices Festival in Moscow.

=== The Listeners ===
In 2022, Mazzoli premiered The Listeners, her fourth opera with librettist Royce Vavrek, at the Oslo Opera House in Norway. The work was commissioned by the Norwegian National Opera, Opera Philadelphia and Lyric Opera of Chicago. The Listeners was created in collaboration with Canadian writer Jordan Tannahill, who wrote the story specifically for their collaboration. The Listeners tells the story of Claire Devon, a fictional woman whose life and beliefs are irrevocably altered after she starts hearing The Hum. The German premiere of The Listeners will take place in Essen in the spring of 2025.

=== Complications in Sue ===
Mazzoli composed scene two of Complications in Sue, an exquisite corpse-style work composed of ten scenes by different composers, each given one scene of the libretto by Michael R. Jackson for Opera Philadelphia. The work premiered in Philadelphia in February 2026.

=== Lincoln in the Bardo ===
Mazzoli's opera Lincoln in the Bardo, with a libretto by Royce Vavrek based on the bestselling novel of the same name by George Saunders was commissioned by New York’s Metropolitan Opera in 2018. It premiered there on October 17, 2026.

=== The Galloping Cure ===
On May 26, 2024, The Guardian announced Mazzoli’s sixth opera, The Galloping Cure, a collaboration with librettist Royce Vavrek, writer Karen Russell and director Tom Morris, produced by OperaVentures. The article described the work as “a lurid tale of the greed surrounding the tragedy of the opioid crisis”. As of May 2024 commissioning partners included the San Francisco Opera and Norrlands Opera in Sweden. It premiered at the Edinburgh Festival Theatre on August 9, 2026.

== Film and television ==
Mazzoli wrote and performed several songs for the soundtrack of the acclaimed classical music exposé Mozart in the Jungle, most notably "Impromptu", and other work presented within the show's continuity as by character Thomas Pembridge, retired conductor of the (fictional) New York Symphony.

Mazzoli has also contributed music to the documentary Detropia and to the feature films A Woman, A Part, and Loitering with Intent.

== Critical reception ==
Mazzoli was described by The New York Times as "one of the more consistently inventive and surprising composers now working in New York", and by Time Out New York as "Brooklyn's post-millennial Mozart", and as “the 21st century’s gatecrasher of new classical music”. On November 23, 2012 and March 28, 2015, Mazzoli was a guest on NPR's All Things Considered. When Mazzoli became the first woman to receive a mainstage commission from the Metropolitan Opera, Alex Ross of The New Yorker wrote that “the unleashing of Mazzoli’s apocalyptic imagination on the huge Met stage is an occasion eagerly awaited.”

Mazzoli is the recipient of four ASCAP Young Composer Awards, a Fulbright Grant to the Netherlands, the Detroit Symphony's Elaine Lebenbom Award, and grants from the Jerome Foundation, American Music Center, and the Barlow Endowment, and three prizes from the American Academy of Arts and Letters: the Marc Blitzstein Memorial Award for Musical Theater and Opera (2023), the Goddard Lieberson Fellowship (2018) and a Charles Ives Scholarship (2003). Her opera Breaking the Waves was awarded the Music Critics Association of America’s Best Opera prize in 2017 and nominated for Best World Premiere at the International Opera Awards.

After the LA premiere of her first opera, Song from the Uproar, Mark Swed of the Los Angeles Times wrote that "Her wonderful score is seductive, meditative, spiritually elusive and subversive. With it, we can welcome a new natural for the art form."

== Luna composition lab ==
In 2016, Mazzoli and composer Ellen Reid founded Luna Composition Lab, a non-profit organization dedicated to closing the gender gap in music composition. Luna Composition Lab provides mentorship, community and performance opportunities to female, non-binary and gender nonconforming composers ages 13 to 18. The organization holds a yearly call-for-scores and a spring festival to showcase works by their composition fellows. In 2024 Luna Composition Lab partnered with the Kronos Quartet as part of the quartet’s 50th anniversary.

== Awards and nominations ==
Year	Award	Category	Work	Result
2017	Music Critics Association of North America Award	Best New Opera	Breaking the Waves	Won
2017	International Opera Award	Best World Premiere	Breaking the Waves	Nominated
2019	Grammy Award	Best Contemporary Classical Composition	Vespers for Violin	Nominated
2019	Music Critics’ Association of North America Award	Best New Opera	Proving Up	Runner Up
2024	Grammy Award	Best Contemporary Classical Composition	Dark With Excessive Bright	Nominated
2024	Grammy Award	Best Classical Compendium	Dark With Excessive Bright	Nominated
