= Barbara Brandt =

American opera singer

Barbara Brandt, also known as Barbara Aurora, (February 18, 1936 – January 30, 2022) was an American spinto soprano who was primarily active in Minneapolis. She was a resident artist with the Minnesota Opera from 1967 through 1983. During her tenure with the company she performed in the world premieres of many operas by American composers; some of which she recorded or filmed. While closely associated with contemporary operas from the 1970s and 1980s, she performed a wide range of opera repertoire. She also sang as a guest artist with other American opera companies, and appeared in concert with American orchestras. After 1983 she worked as reiki practitioner and voice teacher.

== Early life, education, and family ==
The daughter of William Yale Brandt and Winifred Brandt, Barbara Jean Brandt was born on February 18, 1936 in Battlecreek, Michigan. (Note: The Grosses Sängerlexikon states he was born on February 18, 1942. However, the year 1942 does not match primary source documents or historic newspaper sources from her early life. U.S., Index to Public Records, 1994-2019 states she was born in February 1936. The 1940 United States Federal Census gives her age as 4 years old. The 1936 year better matches the age given for Barbara Brandt in reporting in the Battle Creek Enquirer in 1957. The 1936 birth year is also more believable because of her reported high school graduation in 1954.) From 1948 to 1954 she studied singing with Maude Russell, and attended the Interlochen Center for the Arts while a teenager. At the age of 17 she made her professional debut with Battle Creek Symphony Orchestra as the soprano soloist in George Frideric Handel's Messiah. She graduated from Lakeview High School in Battle Creek in 1954.

While a student at Michigan State University (MSU), Brandt was employed as a resident soprano at The Peoples Church of East Lansing. She attended MSU on a scholarship, and was a voice student of Gene Greenwell who was then head of the MSU music department. She portrayed Belinda in MSU's 1956 production of Henry Purcell's Dido and Aeneas with Lois Laverty as Dido. Other role she performed at MSU included Susanna in The Marriage of Figaro (1957), and Elena Ivanovna Popova in The Boor (1958). She graduated with a Bachelor of Music degree in 1958. She later studied singing with Hermann Herz in Michigan Thelma Haverson in Minneapolis, and Oren Brown in New York City.

Brandt married her first husband, Boyd Halstead, while they were both MSU music students on December 22, 1957. The couple moved to Eveleth, Minnesota where they had three children: Gean, Alesia, and Christa. Their marriage ended in divorce. She married her second husband, Howard Wesley Balk, on September 30, 1967, in Grant County, South Dakota. They divorced on May 28, 1986, in Pinellas, Florida, and married a second time on January 1, 1998, in King County, Washington. Her second husband, known publicly as Wesley Balk, was the artistic director of Center Opera Company (later Minnesota Opera).

== Career ==
Brandt worked as a public school music teacher before pursuing a career on the stage. She possessed a spinto soprano voice. She won both the local and regional Metropolitan Opera National Council Auditions in 1966. She began a long association with the Minnesota Opera (MO, then Center Opera) in 1967 with whom she made her professional opera debut at the Guthrie Theater in Darius Milhaud's Les malheurs d'Orphée (sung in English as The Sorrows of Orpheus). The short opera was presented alongside several others in a program collectively titled To Hellas. Other early roles she performed with the company included Alice Ford in The Merry Wives of Windsor (1968), Fiordiligi (renamed Eleanora for this English-language version) in Così fan tutte (1968), and the Peasant's Daughter (a.k.a The Wise Woman) in Carl Orff's Die Kluge (1969, given as The Wise Woman and the King).

Brandt was known for singing in the world premieres of several American operas with the MO. The first of these were two one-act operas by Yale Marshall presented in a double bill in December 1969: Oedipus, in which she portrayed Jocasta, and The Sphinx, in which she performed the title role. This was followed by roles in the premieres of Paul and Martha Boesing's The Wanderer (1970, as the Bird Woman) Dominick Argento's Postcard from Morocco (1971, as Lady With a Hat Box), John Gessner's Faust Counter Faust (1971, as Margherita), Conrad Susa's Transformations (1973, as Witch/Anne Sexton), William Huckaby and Philip Brunelle's The Newest Opera In the World (1974, as Lois), Susa's Black River, a Wisconsin Idyll (1975, as Pauline l'Allemand), Argento's The Voyage of Edgar Allan Poe (1976, as Mrs. Poe), Robert Ward's Claudia Legare (1978, as Claudia), Eric Stokes's The Jealous Cellist and Other Acts of Misconduct (1979), and William Mayer's A Death in the Family (1983, as Mary). In 1978 she filmed Transformations for television broadcast, a sang Claudia Legare for radio broadcast on NPR.

Other opera roles Brandt performed with the MO included the title role in Werner Egk's Circe (1970), Pretty Polly / Witch in the United States premiere of Harrison Birtwistle's Punch and Judy (1970), Mistress Page in Ralph Vaughan Williams's Sir John in Love (1970), the title role in Claudio Monteverdi's The Coronation of Poppaea (1971), Constance Fletcher in Virgil Thomson's The Mother of Us All (1971), Countess Almaviva in Mozart's The Marriage of Figaro (1972 & 1978), Jenny in Bertolt Brecht's The Threepenny Opera (1973), Donna Elvira in Mozart's Don Giovanni (1974), Pamina in Mozart's The Magic Flute (1975), a staged version of Johann Sebastian Bach's St Matthew Passion (1977), Jenny Smith in Kurt Weill's Rise and Fall of the City of Mahagonny (1977), Magda in Gian Carlo Menotti's The Consul (1979), Sonia (a.k.a. Hanna Glawari) in The Merry Widow (1980), Candace Whitcomb in Stephen Paulus's The Village Singer (1982),

Outside of Minnesota, Brandt reprised the role of the Bird Woman in The Wanderer at the Houston Grand Opera (HGO) in the summer of 1970, and performed the part of Gretchen in Faust Counter Faust at both the Curran Theatre in San Francisco and the Chicago Auditorium in 1971. In 1972 she reprised her role in Postcard from Morocco at the HGO and the Lake George Opera; also recording the role of Lady With a Hat Box for Desto Records. She performed this role again at the Curran Theatre in 1973.

Brandt was a soloist with the Minnesota Orchestra on several occasions. These included performances as a soloist in Handel's Messiah (1968), Maurice Ravel's L'enfant et les sortilèges (1969), Carl Nielsen's Symphony No. 3 (1969), and John McCabe's orchestral song cycle Notturni ed Alba (1975). In 1973 she was a soloist in the world premiere of Sydney Hodkinson and Lee Devin's Vox Populous with the St. Paul Chamber Orchestra (SPCO). Other works she performed with the SPCO included Arnold Schoenberg's Pierrot lunaire (1974), In 1974 she performed at the Lyric Opera of Kansas City as Mozart's Pamina to Henry Price Tamino, and reprised her role in Susa's Transformations. In 1976 she was a soloist in Gustav Mahler's Symphony No. 4 with the Kansas City Philharmonic. In 1978 she was soloist in Benjamin Britten's War Requiem with St. Olaf Choir.

== Later life ==
In her later life Barbara Brandt went by the name Barbara Aurora. She became a practitioner of reiki using The Radiance Technique. She was also active as a voice teacher. Her husband, Wesley Balk, died in 2003.

Barbara Aurora Brandt died in Minneapolis on January 30, 2022.

== Notes and references ==
=== Bibliography ===
- Mesa, Franklin (2015). Opera: An Encyclopedia of World Premieres and Significant Performances, Singers, Composers, Librettists, Arias and Conductors, 1597–2000. McFarland & Company. ISBN 978-1-4766-0537-1.
- Wlaschin, Ken (2006). "Brandt, Barbara". Encyclopedia of American Opera. McFarland & Company. ISBN 0786421096.
