= Vern Sutton =

American opera singer

Vern Sutton (born April 8, 1938) is an American operatic tenor, opera director, and academic. A founding member of the Minnesota Opera, he has created roles in the world premieres of several contemporary operas with that company; including works composed for his voice by Dominick Argento, Libby Larsen, Eric Stokes, Conrad Susa, and Robert Ward. He was also a regularly featured singer on Garrison Keillor's A Prairie Home Companion for three decades, beginning with its first broadcast in 1974.

From 2002 to 2005, he was director of Opera in the Ozarks at Inspiration Point. For 36 years, he taught on the voice faculty; further, for 30 years, he directed the opera program of the music school at the University of Minnesota.

== Education and career ==
Raised in Oklahoma City, Sutton earned a Bachelor of Music degree from Austin College in 1960 where he was a voice student of Ethel Rader and Bruce Lunkley. He then pursued graduate studies in musicology at the University of Minnesota (UM) where he earned both a M.A. in Music and Doctorate of Music. At the UM he studied voice with Roy Schuessler, and later studied singing at the Rome Opera House with Luigi Ricci through a Fulbright scholarship in 1966–1967.

While a student at the UM, Sutton created the role of the Lord in the world premiere of Argento's Christopher Sly at the Scott Hall Theater on 31 May 1963. That same year he began performing with the newly formed Minnesota Opera. His performances with the company have included roles in several world premieres, including Argento's The Masque of Angels (1964), Argento's The Revelation of Saint John the Divine (1967), Argento's Postcard from Morocco (1971), Susa's Transformations (1973), Susa's Black River (1975), Britten's Albert Herring (the title role), Argento's The Voyage of Edgar Allan Poe (1976), Argento's Water Bird Talk (1977), Hiram Titus' Rosina (1978), Ward's Hedda Gabler (1978), Stokes' The Jealous Cellist (1979), Lars Johan Werle's Animalen (1985), and Argento's Casanova's Homecoming (1985) among others.

Sutton also performed as a guest artist with several American opera companies. In 1971 he made his debut at the San Francisco Spring Opera in the title role [Faust Counter Faust]. He returned their in 1973 to sing Mr. Owen in Postcard from Morocco. Other companies he has performed leading roles with include the Houston Grand Opera and the Lyric Opera of Kansas City.

In 1967 Sutton joined the voice faculty of the University of Minnesota where he served as the long time director of the opera program until his retirement in 2003. During this time he also served as the director of the School of Music from 1991 to 1998.

== Recordings ==
- Dominick Argento's Postcard from Morocco; Orchestra and Chorus of the Minnesota Opera; Philip Brunelle, conductor (Desto Records, 1972)
- Benjamin Britten's Paul Bunyan; Orchestra and Chorus of the Plymouth Music Series; Philip Brunelle, conductor (Virgin Classics, 1987)
- Aaron Copland's The Tender Land; Orchestra and Chorus of the Plymouth Music Series; Philip Brunelle, conductor (Virgin Classics, 1990)
