= Catherine Malfitano =

American opera singer

- Malfitano in 1974
- Born: April 18, 1948; New York City, United States
- Education: Manhattan School of Music
- Occupations: Operatic soprano; Stage director
- Organization: Manhattan School of Music

Catherine Malfitano (born April 18, 1948) is an American operatic soprano and opera director. Malfitano was born in New York City, the daughter of a ballet dancer mother, Maria Maslova, and a violinist father, Joseph Malfitano. She attended the High School of Music and Art and studied at the Frank Corsaro Studio and Manhattan School of Music, graduating in 1971. She often mentions that she was rejected from The Juilliard School.

== Operatic career ==
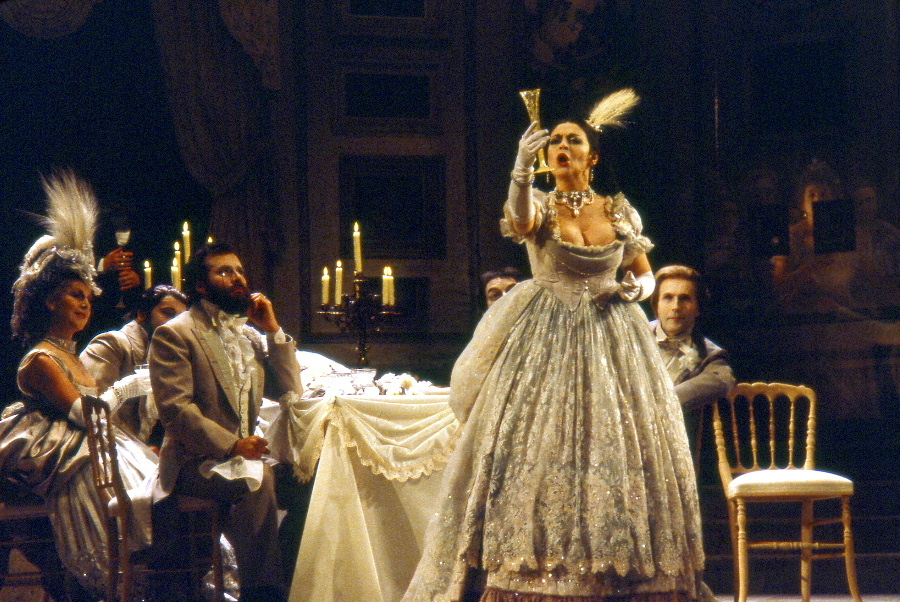
Strasbourg, Opéra national du Rhin, Catherine Malfitano as Violetta. Director Jean-Pierre Ponnelle, 1980.

Malfitano made her professional singing debut in 1972 at the Central City Opera in the role of Nannetta in Verdi's Falstaff. She soon appeared with Minnesota Opera, where she sang in the world premiere of Conrad Susa's Transformations and, in 1974 at the New York City Opera, in Puccini's La bohème, as Mimi. She then appeared with the Lyric Opera of Chicago (1975) and at the Royal Opera House (1976) and in other major European opera houses. She performed in 1974 as Susanna in a new production of Mozart's Le nozze di Figaro at the Holland Festival, and in 1976 as Servilia in a new production of Mozart's La Clemenza di Tito at the Salzburg Festival. In 1978, Malfitano achieved wider recognition in a telecast of Menotti's The Saint of Bleecker Street from NYCO, playing Annina., as well as Rose in Kurt Weill's Street Scene on Live from Lincoln Center in 1979.

Since then, Malfitano has sung at the major opera houses throughout the world, including the Metropolitan Opera in New York City, Teatro alla Scala in Milan, Royal Opera House in London, Théâtre du Châtelet in Paris, La Monnaie in Brussels, Grand Théâtre de Genève, Teatro Comunale Florence, Liceu in Barcelona, Berlin State Opera, Wiener Staatsoper, Bayerische Staatsoper in Munich, Paris Opéra, Hamburgische Staatsoper, De Nederlandse Opera in Amsterdam as well as the Lyric Opera of Chicago, the San Francisco Opera, the Los Angeles Opera, and the Houston Grand Opera.

One of Malfitano's best-known roles is the title role of Puccini's Tosca, for which she won an Emmy Award in 1992, performing alongside Plácido Domingo and Ruggero Raimondi. The opera was broadcast live from the actual Roman settings and viewed worldwide. She is also associated with the title role in Strauss's Salome, notably for performing the "Dance of the Seven Veils" ending the dance completely nude, a rarity in opera. She was also Jenny in Kurt Weill's Aufstieg und Fall der Stadt Mahagonny (Rise and Fall of the City of Mahagonny).

Throughout her career, Malfitano has championed the music of American composers, including Carlisle Floyd, William Bolcom, Conrad Susa and Thomas Pasatieri.

In 2005, Malfitano started a second career as an opera director, with a production of Puccini's Madama Butterfly for Central City Opera (the company with which she made her professional singing debut in 1972). Since then, she has created productions for La Monnaie, Florida Grand Opera, Washington National Opera, San Francisco Opera's Merola programme, English National Opera, the Lyric Opera of Chicago and the Canadian Opera Company.

She is a member of the voice faculty at Manhattan School of Music.

== Repertory ==
She has sung over 70 roles throughout her career and continues to add more in her repertoire. Her repertory includes:

Composer	Opera	Role(s)
Richard Strauss	Salome	Salome
Claudio Monteverdi	L'incoronazione di Poppea	Poppea
Francesco Cavalli	L'Ormindo	Erisbe
Gian Carlo Menotti	The Saint of Bleecker Street	Annina
Christoph Willibald Gluck	Orfeo ed Euridice	Euridice
Kurt Weill	Die Dreigroschenoper	Polly Peachum
Kurt Weill	Street Scene	Anna Maurrant and Rose
Kurt Weill	Aufstieg und Fall der Stadt Mahagonny	Jenny Smith
Gaetano Donizetti	Lucia di Lammermoor	Lucia
Engelbert Humperdinck	Hänsel und Gretel	Gretel
Ludwig van Beethoven	Fidelio	Marzelline and Leonore
Francis Poulenc	Les Mamelles de Tirésias	Thérèse
Wolfgang Amadeus Mozart	Die Entführung aus dem Serail	Konstanze
Wolfgang Amadeus Mozart	La clemenza di Tito	Servillia
Wolfgang Amadeus Mozart	Le nozze di Figaro	Susanna
Wolfgang Amadeus Mozart	Don Giovanni	Zerlina and Donna Elvira
Samuel Barber	Antony and Cleopatra	Cleopatra
Dmitri Shostakovich	Lady Macbeth of the Mtsensk District	Katerina Lvovna Izmailova
Gioachino Rossini	Il Turco in Italia	Fiorilla
Leoš Janáček	The Makropulos Affair	Emilia Marty
Leoš Janáček	Jenůfa	Kostelnička Buryjovka
Jacques Offenbach	Les Contes d'Hoffmann	The three leading female roles (Olympia, Antonia, Giuletta)
Giacomo Puccini	Il tabarro	Giorgetta
Giacomo Puccini	Suor Angelica	Sister Angelica
Giacomo Puccini	Gianni Schicchi	Lauretta
Giacomo Puccini	Tosca	Floria Tosca
Giacomo Puccini	La bohème	Mimi
Giacomo Puccini	Madama Butterfly	Cio-Cio-San
Jules Massenet	Manon	Manon
Giuseppe Verdi	Macbeth	Lady Macbeth
Giuseppe Verdi	La traviata	Violetta Valery
Giuseppe Verdi	Stiffelio	Lina
William Bolcom	A View from the Bridge	Beatrice
Alban Berg	Lulu	Lulu
Alban Berg	Wozzeck	Marie
Charles Gounod	Romeo et Juliette	Juliette

== Selected discography ==
=== Record ===
External audio
- You may hear Catherine Maltifano as Salome in Richard Strauss's opera Salome, Op. 54 with the Vienna Philharmonic Orchestra conducted by Christoph von Dohnányi and Bryn Terfel in 1995 Here on archive.org

- Catherine Malfitano, Joseph Malfitano. Music For Voice and Violin, MHS/Musical Heritage Society Inc., 1974.
- Gounod Roméo et Juliette, EMI, 1983
- Monteverdi L'incoronazione di Poppea, Poppea, CBS, 1985
- Richard Strauss Salome, Polygram, 1995.
- Puccini Tosca, Teldec 1996.
- Rossini Stabat Mater, EMI/Angel/Virgin, 1996.
- Christoph Willibald Gluck Orfeo ed Euridice, Gala, 2000.
- William Bolcom A View from the Bridge, New World, 2001.

=== Video ===
- Blue Moon Cat: Catherine Malfitano Live at Joe's Pub, Video Arts International, 2001
- Songs My Father Taught Me, Video Arts International, 2002
- The Metropolitan Opera Centennial Gala (1983), Deutsche Grammophon, 00440-073-4538, 2009
- James Levine's 25th Anniversary Metropolitan Opera Gala (1996), Deutsche Grammophon DVD, B0004602-09, 2005
- Verdi Stiffelio (1993), Opus Arte DVD, OA R3103 D, 2008
- Puccini Tosca (1992), Teldec Warner Classics DVD/BR, 2564-64529-2
