= Edward Foreman =

American opera singer

Edward Foreman (1937 – 2018) was an American operatic bass, scholar of singing technique, and teacher. He was founder and editor of the Pro Musica Press (Minneapolis), which reprinted historical treatises in facsimile and transcription, and also translated them into English. According to Richard Wistreich, these translations offer a uniquely comprehensive and valuable collection of Bel Canto pedagogy in English. He argues that "a growing number of influential singing teachers […] agree [with Foreman]", that there should be a revival of those old, healthy, singing practices.

Foreman’s book ‘The Art of bel canto in the Italian Baroque. A Study of the Original Sources’, which covers the period between 1562 and 1810, was recommended as an excellent and accurate resource that avoids dissecting the original sources to fit recent concepts of pedagogy.

== Publications ==
- Transformative Voice, ProMusica Press, 1996, ISBN 1887117105
- Voice without technique, a manual for singers and teachers, ProMusica Press, 1998, ISBN 9781887117111
- R M Bacon, Elements of Vocal Science, ProMusica Press, 1966, ISBN 1887117067
- Mancini, Gianbattista, Practical reflections on figured singing (1774 & 1777) ProMusica Press, 1967, ISBN 9780722260890
- The Porpora Tradition, (Corri, The singer’s preceptor Vols 1&2, 1811 and Isaac Nathan, Musurgia Vocalis 1816) ProMusica Press, 1968 OCLC 39944
- Tosi, Pierfrancesco: Opinions of singers, Ancient and Modern, or Observations on Figured Singing, ProMusica Press, 1993, ISBN 9781887117012
- Pellegrini, Anna Maria, Grammar, or, Rules for singing well, ProMusica Press, 2001, ISBN 1887117148
- Late renaissance singing : Giovanni Camillo Maffei, Discourse on the voice and the method of learning to sing ornamentation, without a teacher (1562); Lodovico Zacconi, the practice of music, book one, chapters LVIII-LXXX (1592); Giovanni Battista Bovicelli, Rules, passages of music (1594); Giovanni Luca Conforto, Brief and easy method ... (1603?) with English translation ProMusica Press, 2001, ISBN 1887117156
- Authentic Singing, Being The History and Practice Of the Art of Singing And Teaching in Two Volumes ProMusica Press, 2001, ISBN 1887117121
- Giuseppe Aprile, The modern Italian method of singing : with a variety of progressive examples & thirty six solfeggi, ProMusica Press, 2001, ISBN 1887117164
- The Art of bel canto in the Italian Baroque: A study of the original sources, ProMusica Press, 2006, ISBN 9781887117173
- A bel canto Method or How to Sing Italian Baroque Music Correctly Based on the Primary Sources, ProMusica Press, 2006, ISBN 9781887117180

== Recordings ==
- Dominick Argento, Postcard from Morocco, conductor Philip Brunelle, Orchestra of the Centre Opera Company (Minnesota Opera), Desto Records, 1972, complete opera
