= Mark Thomsen =

American opera singer

Mark A. Thomsen (born March 6, 1956) is an American operatic tenor. He is also a professor and artist in residence at Florida Southern College. His performance repertoire includes the history of opera, from Cavalli, Bach, and Mozart, to Puccini, Verdi, and Richard Strauss, and the premieres of operas by composers such as Dominick Argento, Leonard Bernstein, Carlisle Floyd and Lowell Liebermann.

== Early life and education ==
Thomsen is from Minnesota, where he attained his bachelor's degree from Gustavus Adolphus College and spent two years as an apprentice with the Minnesota Opera before relocating to Rochester, New York for his master's degree in Applied Voice from the Eastman School of Music. During this period he also twice won the Pavarotti Award at the Metropolitan Opera's National Council auditions.

== Performing career ==
After graduation from Eastman, he was a member of the Houston Opera Studio for three years, appearing in mainstage productions of Peter Grimes, Der fliegende Holländer, Eugene Onegin, La traviata, Fidelio, and Trouble in Tahiti. Shortly thereafter, he joined the ensemble, which performed Leonard Bernstein's A Quiet Place at the Kennedy Center, La Scala, and Vienna Staatsoper, before recording the opera for Deutsche Grammophon.

For the next two years, Thomsen developed his early career under the guidance of Beverly Sills at the New York City Opera, where he performed the title role of La clemenza di Tito, Don Ottavio in Don Giovanni, Pinkerton in Madama Butterfly, and many others, including the premiere of Argento's Casanova's Homecoming. At the conclusion of his first year in New York City, he received the New York City Opera Debut Artist of the Year award.

Thomsen spent several seasons with the Santa Fe Opera, a renowned center for progressive opera, where his repertoire expanded to include Flamand in Capriccio, Tamino in Die Zauberflöte and roles in the American premiere of Hans-Jürgen von Bose's The Sorrows of Young Werther and Siegfried Matthus's Judith. Subsequently, Mr. Thomsen appeared in roles such as Henry Morosus in Die Schweigsame Frau, the Steuermann in Der fliegende Holländer, in Strauss's Friedenstag and Feuersnot.

Additional engagements include: the title role in the American premiere of Lowell Liebermann's The Picture of Dorian Gray (Florentine Opera), as Gerald in a Chicago Opera Theater's production of Lakmé, as Camp Williams in Cold Sassy Tree (Austin Lyric Opera and Kansas City Opera), as Lenski in Eugene Onegin (Indianapolis Opera), as the title role in Werther and as Jenik in The Bartered Bride (Washington Opera), Lennie in Of Mice and Men and the title role in Les contes d'Hoffmann (Edmonton Opera), the title role in Faust with the New Orleans Opera, and as Fitzpiers in the world premiere of Stephen Paulus' The Woodlanders. In February 2000 he also portrayed Miguel Morales in the world premiere concert and recording session for Daren Hagen's Bandanna.

Additional companies he has performed with include the Opera Theatre of St. Louis, Connecticut Opera, Dallas Opera, Houston Grand Opera, Atlanta Opera,Minnesota Opera, Boston Lyric Opera, Portland Opera, Opera Columbus, Opera Omaha, Spoleto Festival USA, and the Colorado Music Festival. European engagements have included several seasons with the Vienna Volksoper where he performed leading roles in operettas and Mozart operas. He toured Japan with the Volksoper and later joined the Vienna Staatsoper as Count Almaviva in Il Barbiere di Siviglia. He made his Opéra de Nantes debut as Belmonte in Die Entführung aus dem Serail and returned in a later season as Count Almaviva in Il Barbiere di Siviglia.

Memorable performances of recent years have included Tenors 4U concerts, a role as Frederic in Pirates of Penzance and as Mario Cavaradossi in Tosca in Florida, a "Holiday of Musicals" in Guatemala City, Don Ottavio in Don Giovanni at the Lincoln Center with the Met, an acclaimed stand-in for Don Jose for the Chicago Lyric Opera's Carmen, and Nicias in an exotic Palm Beach production of Thaïs. He has also fulfilled engagements with the Metropolitan Opera to cover the roles of Don Ottavio in Mozart's Don Giovanni, Nicias in Massenet's Thais, Rinaldo in Rossini's L'Armida, and others.

== Other work ==
In addition to his frequent presence on the operatic stage, Mr. Thomsen has appeared on Garrison Keillor's A Prairie Home Companion radio program several times to sing lyric recital pieces and participate in comedic skits and has been involved with pre-performances of Garrison Keillor's first opera, Mr. and Mrs. Olson.
