= Casanova's Homecoming =

1985 opera by Dominick Argento

Casanova's Homecoming is an opera in three acts by Dominick Argento to an English libretto by the composer, based in part on Giacomo Casanova's memoir. It was first performed by the Minnesota Opera in Saint Paul, Minnesota, in April 1985. It was staged by the New York City Opera in November 1985 with Timothy Nolen as Casanova, David Hamilton as Lorenzo, Mark Thomsen as Gabrielle, John Lankston as the Marquis De Lisle, Susanne Marsee as Bellino, and Joyce Castle as Madame d'Urfé.

The opera has set numbers with recitative and spoken dialog. It is set in Venice in 1774.

== Roles ==
Roles, voice types, premiere cast
Role	Voice type	Premiere cast, 12 April 1985 Conductor: Scott Bergeson
Casanova	baritone	Julian Patrick
Lorenzo	baritone	Vern Sutton
Gabrielle	tenor	Mark Jackson
Marquis De Lisle	tenor	Douglas Perry
Bellino	mezzo-soprano	Susanne Marsee
Madame d'Urfé	contralto	Elaine Bonazzi
Marcantonio	treble	Kris Root
Giuletta	soprano	Carol Gutknecht
Barbara	soprano	Michele McBride
Teresa	mezzo-soprano	Susanne Marsee

== Discography ==
- Dominick Argento: Casanova's Homecoming, Moores School of Music/University of Houston, Débria Brown; Peter Jacoby (conductor), 2001 [live] 2 CDs, Newport Classic 85673
