= Postcard from Morocco =

Opera by Dominick Argento

Postcard from Morocco is an opera in one act composed by Dominick Argento, with libretto written by John Donahue under a commission from the Center Opera Company (now the Minnesota Opera). It is based on A Child's Garden of Verses by Robert Louis Stevenson. The opera premiered on October 14, 1971, at the Cedar Theater in Minneapolis, Minnesota, conducted by Philip Brunelle with stage direction by John Donahue. The opera was a success, and continues to be performed around the world.

== Roles ==
| Role | Voice type | Premiere cast, October 14, 1971 (conductor: Philip Brunelle) |
|---|---|---|
| Mr. Owen | Tenor | Vern Sutton |
| Lady with a Hat Box | Soprano | Barbara Brandt |
| Foreign singer | Mezzo-soprano | Janis Hardy |
| Lady with a Hand Mirror | Coloratura soprano | Sarita Roche |
| Man with Old Luggage/ Puppet #1 | Lyric tenor | Yale Marshall |
| Shoe salesman/ Puppet #2 | Baritone | Barry Busse |
| Man with a Cornet Case/ Puppet Maker | Bass | Edward Foreman |
| Two Mimes | None | Wendy Lehr, Bain Boehlke |

== Orchestration ==
The cast consists of only seven singing characters, and the orchestra is small; a piano, clarinet, saxophone, trombone, violin, viola, bass, a small percussion section, and classical guitar. The orchestra at times feels like a band in the train station scoring the action around them. The score also calls for non-traditional sounds of a train at the beginning and end of the piece. It asks for a whistle; it is possible to include the sound of the train (steam releasing, brakes) at the station for the beginning and end of the opera book ending it, emphasizing the station as a place people merely pass through not dwell in. These can be done with a live whistle but using a sound system provides greater range in dynamics and timbrel quality of the train sounds.

== Synopsis ==
The characters are waiting in a train station; each of them reveals what they do but will not reveal the contents of their luggage, which they can't part with. The puppet master, who appears to live in the train station, tries to control and manipulate the passengers. The passengers all leave except one, Mr. Owen, who acts out a story about sailing away on a boat. Mr. Owen rebels against the puppet master breaking his control over the passengers. The puppet master does retain his control over one of the passengers, the Foreign Singer, whom he eerily controls at the very last moments of the play.

== Analysis ==
This opera “has no clearly discernible plot but makes its effects through a powerful series of images and inferences,” The opera highlights human cruelty and the resulting armor we all put up. Questioning others' motivations, these characters spend the entire opera suspicious of one another not really seeing their common traits, and not aware of the puppet master who is skillfully trying to seduce the passengers to become his marionettes. One critic says, "I cannot help feeling uncertain about a libretto in which opportunities for emotion are so easily come by… that the significance of what goes on has to be explained in a foreword.” This can be reinforced by the way Argento describes the process: "an untitled piece…a dozen or so typewritten pages of dialog, unassigned to any specific individual." The lack of structure is a tool used by the creators to control the response, forcing a lack of trust in our purpose in life. It is a surrealist opera about a group of strangers in a train station. These passengers guard their possessions because they define them. It is existentialist, like the plays of Samuel Beckett. Their possessions create their need for existence rather than some self-motivation. The librettist gives these directions to help define the setting and general tone of the piece. It should be set "distinctively off or odd…not morbid or peculiar so much as wacky or exotic." This, and the oddities of the score, help classify it as surreal; an amalgamation of music and text condensed into a one-act opera.

== Form ==
Postcard is an eclectic mix of forms. There is a selection from Wagner in the opera (Souvenirs de Bayreuth), which is an orchestral section during which a play is put on by mimes. In addition, it incorporates cabaret, and operetta. Argento describes himself as including “the whole world of music in his oyster.” One describes the piece saying, “Mr. Argento’s idiom is largely tonal, conservative yet distinctly his own, and borrows from ragtime and other strains of popular music.” This eclectic mix adds to the lyrics by reinforcing the exotic and distinctively odd goals of the piece.

== Recording ==
| Year | Cast (Lady with a Hand Mirror, Lady with a Cake Box, Foreign singer, Man with Old Luggage/ Puppet #1, Mr. Owen, Shoe salesman/ Puppet #2, Man with a Cornet Case/ Puppet Maker) | Opera house and orchestra, conductor | Label |
|---|---|---|---|
| 1972 | Sarita Roche; Barbara Brandt Balk; Janis Hardy; Yale Marshall; Vern Sutton; Barry Busse; Edward Foreman | Orchestra of the Center Opera Company Philip Brunelle | Audio CD: Desto |
| 2009 | Rinnat Moriah; Amanda Majeski; Tammy Coil; Joshua Stewart; Brian Zachary Porter; Elliot Madore; Evan Hughes; Curtis Opera Theater and Curtis Chamber Ensemble; Rossen Milanov | | Audio CD: Albany |
