= Center City Opera Theater =

Opera Company

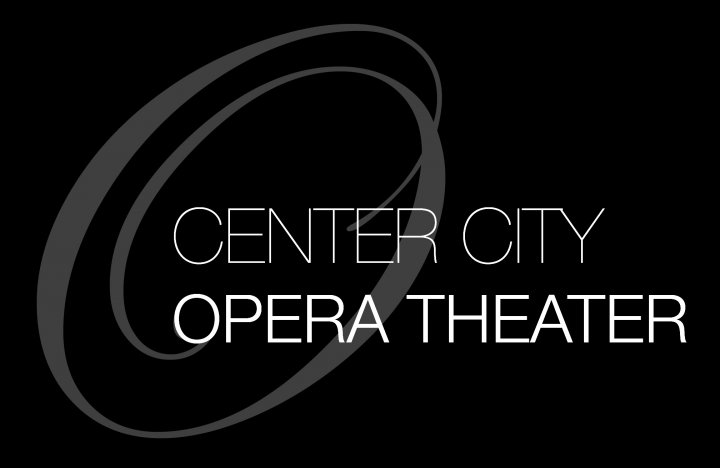

Background information
- Origin: Philadelphia, Pennsylvania, USA
- Genres: opera
- Years active: 1999-present
- Members: General & Artistic Director; Andrew M. Kurtz
- Website: www.operatheater.org

Center City Opera Theater (CCOT) is an opera company based in Philadelphia, Pennsylvania. Founded in 1999, CCOT performs at venues throughout the Greater Philadelphia area, though its main stage performance home is the Perelman Theater at the Kimmel Center for the Performing Arts.

== History ==
Since its founding in 1999 by General and Artistic Director Andrew Kurtz, CCOT has produced over four dozen operas which include newly commissioned works and traditional operas. CCOT provides professional training and performance opportunities for young opera professionals including singers, directors, designers, and instrumentalists. CCOT’s OPERAtunities in Education school program works with multiple partner schools in Philadelphia and surrounding areas.

In September 2008, CCOT launched ConNEXTions: The Next Generation of Opera during the Philadelphia Fringe Festival, presenting the world premieres and workshops of new works. Creative Development Projects (CDP), directed by Albert Innaurato, grew out of ConNEXTions and is an ongoing series that facilitates the production of new opera works through successive workshops, guiding a work from initial conception all the way to its world premiere.

Since 2010, in an attempt to cultivate broader opera audiences through intimate performances, CCOT has increasingly made use of site-specific venues, such as the Italian Market and the Comcast Center in Philadelphia.

== Creative Development Projects ==
- Slaying the Dragon by Michael Ching and Ellen Frankel (workshops Jan. & Sept. 2011; world premiere June. 2012)
- Danse Russe by Paul Moravec and Terry Teachout (workshops Jul. & Nov. 2010, Jan. 2011; world premiere Apr. 2011)
- Maren of Vardo by Jeff Myers and Royce Vavrek (workshops Oct. 2010, Feb. 2011)
- Love/Hate by Jack Perla and Rob Bailis (workshops Sept. 2010; Sept. 2011)
- The Great Blondin by Ronald G. Vigue and Albert Innaurato (workshop Sept. 2009)

== Commissioned works ==
- The Picture of Dorian Gray (chamber orchestra version) by Lowell Liebermann, June 2007: Perelman Theater, Kimmel Center.
- Danse Russe by Paul Moravec and Terry Teachout, April 2010; Perelman Theater, Kimmel Center.
- Slaying the Dragon by Michael Ching and Ellen Frankel, June 2012: performance held at both the Prince Music Theater & the Helen Corning Warden Theater, Academy of Vocal Arts
