= Wesley Balk =

American theatre director (1932–2003)

H. Wesley Balk (October 31, 1932 – March 21, 2003) was an American performance theorist/coach and stage director. He was artistic director of the Minnesota Opera for almost twenty years, where he directed several world premieres, including Conrad Susa's Transformations.

He authored several books on performance, including The Complete Singer-Actor and The Radiant Performer.

== Sources ==
- Hahn, Trudi (March 22, 2003). "H. Wesley Balk, opera director, dies at 70; The Minnesota Opera's creative leader helped develop an American style of operatic performance". Star Tribune. Minneapolis, MN. Archived from the original on November 4, 2012 – via HighBeam Research.
- "H. Wesley Balk". Star Tribune. 2003-04-06.
- Opera America, Transformations, North American Works Directory (accessed 6 June 2010)
