= The Picture of Dorian Gray (opera) =

Opera by Lowell Liebermann

The Picture of Dorian Gray, op. 45, is an American opera in two acts and 12 scenes, with libretto and music by Lowell Liebermann, based on the 1890 novel of the same name by Oscar Wilde.

The opera had its world premiere at the Monte Carlo Opera on 8 May 1996, in a production by John Cox, conducted by Steuart Bedford. Bedford also conducted the American premiere, on 5 February 1999 by Florentine Opera, Milwaukee, Wisconsin. The Center City Opera Theater in Philadelphia commissioned a re-orchestration of the opera for chamber orchestra. This version received its first performance on June 6, 2007 at the Perelman Theater in the Kimmel Center for the Performing Arts, Philadelphia, Pennsylvania, in a production by Leland Kimball, conducted by Andrew M. Kurtz. Aspen Opera Center staged the work in July 2014.

== Roles ==
Role	Voice type	World premiere, 8 May 1996	US premiere, 5 February 1999
Dorian Gray	tenor	Jeffrey Lentz	Mark Thomsen
Lord Henry Wotton	baritone	John Hancock	John Hancock
Sibyl Vane	soprano	Korliss Uecker	Erie Mills
Basil Hallward	bass-baritone	Gregory Reinhart	Kelly Anderson
Basil's Butler	baritone	Eric Frachey	Robert Garner
Whore	soprano	Vivian Tierney	Nancy Shade
James Vane	baritone	Ron Baker	
Lord Geoffrey	high tenor	Stephen Chaundy	Brandon Jovanovich
Gamekeeper	tenor	Bryan Jones	

== Synopsis ==
=== Act I ===
Scene 1
In the studio of Basil Hallward, Basil and his old university friend Lord Henry Wotton converse as Basil completes his new portrait of Dorian Gray, a handsome young aristocrat who has become Basil's muse. Lord Henry wishes to meet Dorian, but Basil says he would be a bad influence on Dorian. After Dorian arrives to pose for Basil, Lord Henry and Dorian engage in conversation whilst Basil becomes completely absorbed in his painting, and does not stop the two from talking. Basil declares the finished painting to be his masterpiece. Dorian then laments the fact that while he will grow old, the picture will remain young forever, saying 'If it were only the other way...for that, I would give my soul.' Basil notices a change in Dorian and accuses Lord Henry of becoming a bad influence on him. Not wanting his painting to harm his friendship with Dorian and Lord Henry, Basil attempts to destroy it, but Dorian prevents this, saying that this would be murder. Lord Henry invites them to the opera that evening. Basil declines and asks Dorian to say behind to dine with him, but Dorian accepts the invitation.

Scene 2
A month later, at a visit to Lord Henry's house, Dorian says that he has fallen in love with a young Shakespearean actress, Sibyl Vane. He asks Lord Henry to bring Basil with him to Sibyl's performance as Juliet the next night. Lord Henry accepts, and after Dorian, thinks about his attraction to and influence over the young man.

Scene 3
The next night, as Sibyl is dressing for the performance, she and Dorian sing of their love. After Dorian leaves, Sibyl's brother James, a sailor, says goodbye as he is about to depart for Australia. Having heard that a gentleman visits her backstage every night, he asks his name, to which Sibyl replies 'Romeo'. James tells her that if this man does her any wrong, he will 'kill him like a dog'.

Scene 4
Sibyl's performance was unexpectedly poor, with the audience expressing its disapproval. Dorian, Basil, and Lord Henry go backstage, where an embarrassed Dorian sends his friends away before Sibyl enters the dressing room. On doing so, she explains her poor performance by saying that because Dorian has shown her real love, she will no longer be able to 'mimic passion' on the stage. Dorian replies that she has killed his love for her: "Without your art, you are nothing!" Sibyl begs him not to leave her, but as she lies sobbing at his feet, he leaves. In a soliloquy, she wishes for his return, recalling fragments of Romeo and Juliet, and stares at the poison bottle in her hands.

Scene 5
The next morning, Dorian sees that his portrait has changed, with a cruel expression around the mouth. He muses that the painting has become 'the visible emblem of my conscience'. He pledges to reform his life and marry Sibyl to make amends. However, Lord Henry arrives with the news that Sibyl Vane has committed suicide. He calms Dorian by assuring him that she was less real than Shakespeare's heroines that she portrayed. Dorian agrees to go to the opera with him that night. Looking again at the altered portrait, he resolves to let it represent the life he shall now lead, in search of 'pleasures secret and subtle, wild joys and wilder sins'. Basil arrives to console Dorian for the loss of Sibyl, but is dismayed to find Dorian calmly dressing for the opera. Although Basil feels unease, he promises to Dorian never to speak again about the matter. After Basil departs, Dorian tells his butler, before going to the opera, to hire two men to move the painting to the attic. He finally looks into a gilt hand mirror.

=== Act II ===
Scene 1
Eighteen years later, Dorian and Basil meet at Dorian's home. Whilst Basil has aged considerably, Dorian looks unchanged. Before leaving for Paris, Basil wants to speak to Dorian about the disturbing rumours about his behaviour. Dorian invites him to the attic, in order to show Basil his soul.

Scene 2
In the attic, Dorian unveils his covered portrait. Its bloody and distorted image shocks Basil, who says that Dorian must be far more evil than the rumours suggest. He then begs Dorian to pray for forgiveness. Dorian then takes a knife on the table near the portrait and stabs Basil to death.

Scene 3
Later that night, Dorian visits a dockside tavern, frequented by sailors and prostitutes. When a prostitute apparently familiar with Dorian solicits him, he shuns her and she mocks him. When he leaves, she calls out the nickname 'Romeo'. Upon hearing that, a sailor follows Dorian outside.

Scene 4
Outside the tavern, the sailor identifies himself as James Vane, pulls out a gun, and vows to kill Dorian for causing her death. Dorian pretends that he did not know Sibyl and asks how long ago she died. After James answers 18 years, Dorian tells him to look at him under a street light. On so doing, James retrenches, as such a young man could not possibly have known his sister at the time, and Dorian leaves. The prostitute then tells James that Dorian corrupted her 18 years ago, expressing her belief, common to others, that Dorian sold his soul to the devil for a handsome face. For money, she offers to tell him how to find Dorian.

Scene 5
Several days later, at a hunting party at Lord Geoffrey's estate, Dorian tells Lord Henry of his fear of death. Lord Geoffrey aims at a hare, and Dorian tells him not to shoot. Lord Geoffrey shoots nonetheless, and a terrible human scream is heard. Badly shaken, Dorian thinks it a bad omen. The gamekeeper says the dead man is a stranger, apparently a sailor. Demanding to see the body, Dorian is relieved to discover that the dead man is James Vane, although he says he has never seen the man before.

Scene 6
Several weeks later, in Dorian's sitting room, Dorian tells Lord Henry, who is also aged, that he has vowed to reform and offers as proof a story of his having spared a young country girl from sexual exploitation. Lord Henry scoffs and says that Dorian has only made himself feel good whilst possibly breaking the girl's heart. Dorian replies that he never should have mentioned the girl to Lord Henry, who retorts that Dorian will always tell him everything. Dorian then asks how Lord Henry would react at the idea that he murdered Basil Hallward. Lord Henry is dismissive and changes the topic to the mystery of Dorian's continual youth, comparing Dorian's life to his own lost youth. He asks Dorian to join him on a riding excursion the next day as he leaves. Dorian picks up a hand mirror, looks into it, then throws it down in disgust and smashes it under his feet.

Scene 7
Alone in the attic, Dorian contemplates the degradation of his life and his evil influence on others. Thinking about the young girl with whom he broke off, he removes the cover from his portrait, hoping to find some diminution of his temporal corruption. To his dismay, he sees instead a new look of hypocrisy and corruption. Hoping to destroy the one visual proof of his evil, he stabs the portrait with the same knife used to kill Basil. A terrible scream is heard. The portrait has regained its original look of the young Dorian, whilst on the floor lies the horribly disfigured body of a wrinkled old man, covered in blood, with a knife in his heart.

== See also ==
- Adaptations of The Picture of Dorian Gray
