= Transformations (opera) =

1973 chamber opera by Conrad Susa

Transformations is a chamber opera in two acts by the American composer Conrad Susa with a libretto of ten poems by Anne Sexton from her 1971 book Transformations, a collection of confessional poetry based on stories by the Brothers Grimm. Commissioned by Minnesota Opera, the work, which is described by its composer as "An Entertainment in 2 Acts", had its world premiere on 5 May 1973 at the Cedar Village Theater in Minneapolis, Minnesota. Anne Sexton, who had worked closely with Susa on the libretto, was in the audience. It went on to become one of the most frequently performed operas by an American composer with its chamber opera format of eight singers and an instrumental ensemble of eight musicians making it particularly popular with smaller opera companies and conservatories. The 2006 revival production of Transformations at the Wexford Opera Festival won The Irish Times Theatre Award for Best Opera Production.

== Background and performance history ==
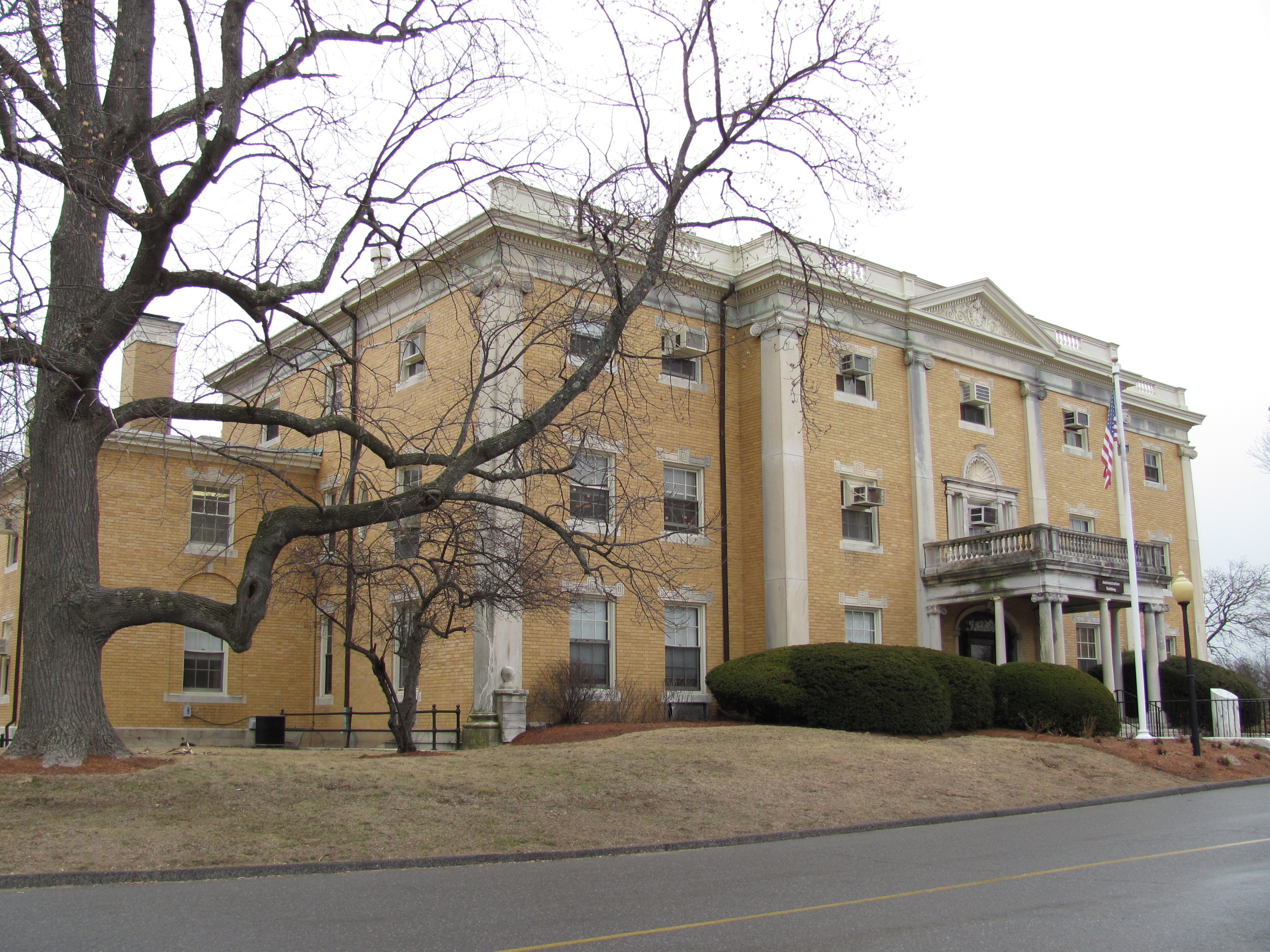
McLean Psychiatric Hospital in Belmont, Massachusetts where Anne Sexton taught poetry in 1968 and where she herself became a patient in 1973

Transformations was commissioned from Conrad Susa in 1972 by Minnesota Opera, a company specializing in new works by American composers. Later that year, Susa approached the American poet Anne Sexton with the idea of using her 1971 book, Transformations, a poetic re-telling of sixteen stories by the Brothers Grimm, as the basis for the libretto. Delighted with the idea of hearing her poetry as song, she cooperated closely with Susa in selecting and arranging the ten poems which would form the basis of the opera. Transformations premiered on 5 May 1973 at the Cedar Village Theater in Minneapolis, Minnesota. The premiere production was conducted by Philip Brunelle and directed by H. Wesley Balk with set and costume design by Robert Israel and lighting design by Bruce Miller. Sexton herself was in the audience that night. She subsequently returned to Minneapolis for further performances and made a tape-recording of the opera which she listened to repeatedly and played for her friends and family. In August 1978, the opera received its US television premiere when it was broadcast on the PBS network in a slightly shortened version performed by Minnesota Opera and co-produced by WNET and KTCA. Anne Sexton did not live to see the broadcast. Throughout her life she had suffered from mental illness with repeated suicide attempts followed by stays in psychiatric hospitals. On 4 October 1974, dressed in her mother's old fur coat, she killed herself at her home in Weston, Massachusetts.

Transformations went on to become one of the most frequently performed operas by an American composer. Its chamber opera format has made it particularly popular with smaller opera companies and conservatories. Notable US revivals include those at the Spoleto Festival USA (1980), the San Francisco Opera with Roberta Alexander as Anne Sexton (1980), Aspen Music Festival with Renée Fleming as Anne Sexton (1982), New York Opera Repertory Theater at Merkin Hall in New York City (1987), Center for Contemporary Opera in New York City (1996), Opera Theatre of Saint Louis (1997), Peabody Institute (1999 and 2010), San Francisco Opera's Merola Program with the composer in the audience (2006), University of Maryland Opera Studio (2007), and the Juilliard School (2010). Although it has remained relatively unknown in Europe, Transformations had its UK premiere in 1978 performed by the English Music Theatre Company and was one of the featured operas of the 2006 Wexford Opera Festival in Ireland. The Wexford production, directed by Michael Barker-Caven, won the 2006 Irish Times Theatre Award for Best Opera Production. The continental European premiere, directed by Elsa Rooke, was given at the Lausanne Opera in June 2006.

The original Minnesota Opera production was set in a mental hospital, a setting used in most of its revivals. However, the 2006 San Francisco production was set in an outdoor party in 1970s American suburbia, while the 2007 University of Maryland production was set in a 1970s nightclub (complete with a disco ball) and modelled on Studio 54. The opera was given a pop-art treatment, inspired by Klaus Oldenburg and Andy Warhol, when it was performed in 1980 at San Francisco's Palace of Fine Arts by San Francisco Spring Opera in a production designed by Thomas Munn and directed by Richard C. Hudson.

== Score ==
Described by its composer as "An Entertainment in 2 Acts", the opera has a running time of approximately two hours and is scored for eight singers and an ensemble of eight to nine musicians.

- Voices: two sopranos, one mezzo-soprano, three tenors, one high baritone, and one bass-baritone.
- Instrumentation: clarinet, saxophone, trumpet, trombone, contrabass, electric harpsichord, electric piano, electric celeste, electric organ, and percussion.

The musical style is eclectic with multiple references to American popular music, dance rhythms, and artists of the 1940s and 1950s.

== Roles and original cast ==
Each of the singers in Transformations is referenced by a number on a casting grid (rather than a character name) and takes multiple roles, with one of the sopranos playing Anne Sexton as well as several other characters. The Division of roles is as follows

- 1: The Princess/Virgin/Young Anne/Snow White/Rapunzel/Andrews Sister/Gretel/Briar Rose (soprano)
- 2: Anne Sexton/The Witch/Step-Mother Queen/Aunt/Mother Gothel/Andrews Sister/Briar Rose (soprano)
- 3: The Good Fairy/Mirror/White Snake/Talking Woman/Golden Spring/ Doppelgänger/Mother/Andrews Sister/Narrator/Witch/Twelfth Fairy (mezzo-soprano)
- 4: The Wizard/Servant/Animal/Dwarf/Suspicious Man/King/Truman Capote/Rumpelstiltskin/Vegetable/Tower/Wonderful Musician/Step-Mother/Thirteenth Fairy (tenor)
- 5: The Magic Object/Animal/Dwarf/Dog/Animal/Caged Man/Gardiner/Baby/Vegetable/Tower/Hunter/Pebble/Bird/Fairy (tenor)
- 6: The Prince/Worm/Boy on a Bridge/Messenger/Fox/Hansel (tenor)
- 7: The KingAnimal/Dwarf/Lunatic/Iron Hans/Husband/Tower/Wolf/Bread/Fairy/Father (high baritone)
- 8: The Neighboring King/Hunter/Dwarf/Bird/ Crying Man/King/ Miller/Messenger/Vegetable/Tower/Hare/Father (bass-baritone)

The original cast was:

- 1: Catherine Malfitano
- 2: Barbara Brandt
- 3: Janis Hardy
- 4: Vern Sutton
- 5: Yale Marshall
- 6: James Rogness
- 7: Barry Busse
- 8: William Dansby

== Synopsis ==
The opera is set in a mental hospital, with the patients acting out the tales, although some subsequent revivals have altered the setting. (See Background and performance history above.) The first scene, The Gold Key, is not one of the Grimms' fairy tales, although the title is an allusion to their story, The Golden Key. In both Sexton's original book and the opera, this poem introduces the sequence of re-told fairy tales to follow. As in the original book, each of the subsequent tales also has its own introduction and coda in which the poet comments to the audience on her perception of the significance of the story. Sexton and Susa selected nine of the original sixteen re-told tales for the opera. They are presented in the order in which they appeared in the original book. The first and last tales in the book (Snow White and the Seven Dwarfs and Briar Rose) remain the first and last tales in the opera. According to Susa, "the poems are arranged with the author's approval to emphasize the sub-plot which concerns a middle-aged witch who gradually transforms into a vulnerable beauty slipping into a nightmare." The opera's libretto sticks very closely (usually verbatim) to the wording in the poems. The comments below relate to some of the themes which critics have highlighted in each of Sexton's "transformed" tales.

=== Act 1 ===
Scene 1. The Gold Key – The speaker, Sexton herself (as a "middle-aged witch", her frequent alter-ego), addresses an audience of adults by their first names. Children, the stereotypical audience for fairy tales, are nowhere mentioned. She then tells the story of a sixteen-year-old youth searching for answers, whom she proclaims to be "each of us". He eventually finds a gold key that unlocks the book of Grimm's Fairy Tales in their transformed state.

Scene 2. Snow White and the Seven Dwarfs – The vanity, fragility and naiveté of Snow White ("a dumb bunny" who must be protected by the dwarfs) eventually lead to her becoming the mirror image of her wicked stepmother.

Scene 3. The White Snake – Sexton satirizes marriage as a kind of "deathly stasis", writing of the young husband and wife, "they were placed in a box and painted identically blue and thus passed their days living happily ever after – a kind of coffin".

Scene 4. Iron Hans – The wild man, Iron Hans, eventually freed from his cage becomes a parable for Sexton's own struggles with insanity and society's ambivalence to the mentally ill.

Scene 5. Rumpelstiltskin – Sexton's sardonic view of motherhood, "He was like most new babies, as ugly as an artichoke but the Queen thought him a pearl", co-exists with an urge to identify not with the protagonist/winner of the tale (the former miller's daughter who becomes Queen) but rather with the antagonist/loser (Rumpelstiltskin), a theme which recurs in the following scene, Rapunzel.

=== Act 2 ===
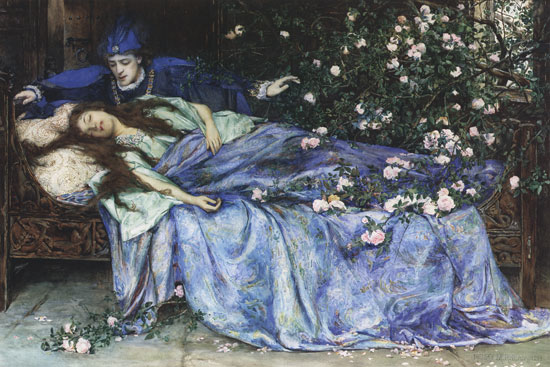
The prince discovers the sleeping Briar Rose in a painting by Henry Maynell Rheam

Scene 6. Rapunzel – Sexton portrays the witch, Mother Gothal, as a lesbian in love with Rapunzel, the young girl she has imprisoned. In the opera, Mother Gothal and Rapunzel sing a duet to "A woman who loves another woman is forever young". Roger Brunyate, who directed the 1999 production at the Peabody Institute, also sees clear allusions in the story to Sexton's beloved great-aunt, who died in a mental institution.

Scene 7. Godfather Death – Sexton's version sticks fairly closely to the Grimms' narrative, and is used to explore the simultaneous desire for and fear of death. The first stanza portrays death as a state of sexual frustration rather than the beginning of an afterlife: "Hurry, Godfather death, Mister tyranny, each message you give has a dance to it, a fish twitch, a little crotch dance". The theme is reinforced by the explicit sexual desire which leads to the physician's fatal defiance of his Godfather. This poem is set, in contrast to the rest of the opera, as an entirely solo piece, a jazz ballad sung by Sexton at a microphone.

Scene 8. The Wonderful Musician – In the introductory lines to the tale, "My sisters, do you remember the fiddlers of your youth? Those dances so like a drunkard lighting a fire in the belly?", Sexton explicitly compares women's sexual response to music with the response of the animals whom the Wonderful Musician enchants and then cruelly entraps. The scene can be read as a cautionary tale about the demonic power of music, but on a deeper level about women cooperating in their own victimization.

Scene 9. Hansel and Gretel – The Grimms' Hansel and Gretel is one of their darkest tales. Two young children repeatedly abandoned in a forest by their father and stepmother, narrowly escape from a cannibal witch by burning her alive in her own oven. Sexton follows the story quite closely but makes it even more disturbing by an introduction in which a mother affectionately pretends to "eat up" her little boy (sung in the opera as "The Witch's Lullaby"). The conflation of mother love with cannibalism becomes explicit as the mother's language becomes increasingly sadistic. "I want to bite, I want to chew [...] I have a pan that will fit you. Just pull up your knees like a game hen."

Scene 10. Briar Rose (The Grimms' variant of Sleeping Beauty) – Sexton eliminates Briar Rose's mother from the narrative and changes the ending of the tale considerably. As in the original, the Prince awakens Briar Rose from her 100-year sleep with a kiss, and the couple marry. However, her first words on being awakened are "Daddy! Daddy!", and for the rest of her life Briar Rose suffers from insomnia. The tale itself is fairly short, preceded and followed by lengthy autobiographical stanzas in which Sexton explicitly alludes to her own psychiatric history involving controversial "recovered memories" of sexual abuse by her father and dissociative trance states.

== Sources ==
- Adams, Byron, "Susa, Conrad (1935)" in Gay Histories and Cultures: An Encyclopedia, George E. Haggerty (ed.), London: Taylor & Francis, 2000, p. 851. ISBN 0-8153-1880-4
- American Psychiatric Association, "Dissociative Trance Disorder" in Diagnostic and Statistical Manual of Mental Disorders (DSM-IV-TR), American Psychiatric Publications, 2000. ISBN 0-89042-025-4
- Brunyate, Roger, "A Feminist Far from Grimm: Anne Sexton and her Transformations", Peabody Institute of the Johns Hopkins University, 1999 (accessed 6 June 2010)
- Del George, Dana, The Supernatural in Short Fiction of the Americas: The Other World in the New World, Greenwood Publishing Group, 2001. ISBN 0-313-31939-1
- ECS Publishing, "Conrad Susa: Transformations", Opera Catalogue 2010, p. 40
- Henahan, Donal, "Opera Repertory Stages Transformations", The New York Times, 20 June 1987 (accessed 6 June 2010)
- Hall, George, "Review: Transformations", The Stage, 30 October 2006 (accessed 6 June 2010)
- Harries, Elizabeth Wanning, "Sexton, Anne (1928–1974)" in The Greenwood Encyclopedia of Folktales and Fairy Tales, vol. 3, Donald Haase (ed.), Greenwood Publishing, 2008, pp. 854–855. ISBN 0-313-33444-7
- Holland, Bernard, "With Anne Sexton's Help, a Grimmer Shade of Grimm", The New York Times, 28 June 1996 (accessed 6 June 2010)
- Kavaler-Adler, Susan, The Creative Mystique: From Red Shoes Frenzy to Love and Creativity, Routledge, 1996. ISBN 0-415-91413-2
- Kennicott, Philip, "Susa's Music, Sexton's Poetry – Transformed", St. Louis Post-Dispatch, 10 June 1997, p. 3D
- Kosman, Joshua, "Medieval tales, Sexton musings fuse into graceful Merola opera", San Francisco Chronicle, 17 July 2006 (accessed 6 June 2010)
- Martín Gonzalez, Matilde, "Fairy tales revisited and transformed: Anne Sexton's critique of social(ized) femininity", Revista española de estudios norteamericanos, No. 17–18, 1999, pp. 9–22
- McGowan, Philip, Anne Sexton and Middle Generation Poetry: The Geography of Grief, Greenwood Publishing, 2004. ISBN 0-313-31514-0
- Opera America, Transformations, North American Works Directory (accessed 6 June 2010)
- Rich, Allan, "Music", New York Magazine, 26 May 1980, pp. 60–61
- Robinson, Lisa B., "Opera Performs Fairy Tales With a Twist", The Juilliard Journal, vol. XXV, no. 5, February 2010 (accessed 6 June 2010)
- Runco, Mark A. and Pritzker, Steven R. (eds.), "Sexton, Anne", Encyclopedia of Creativity, vol. 2, Elsevier, 1999. ISBN 0-12-227077-0
- Sexton, Anne, Transformations, Houghton Mifflin, 1971. ISBN 978-0-395-12722-3
- Sexton, Anne, Anne Sexton: A Self-portrait in Letters, edited and annotated by Lois Ames and Linda Gray Sexton, Houghton Mifflin Harcourt, 2004. ISBN 0-618-49242-9
- Steele, Cassie Premo, We Heal from Memory: Sexton, Lorde, Anzaldúa, and the Poetry of Witness, Palgrave Macmillan, 2000. ISBN 0-312-23342-6
- Swan, Barbara, "A Reminiscence" in Anne Sexton: Telling the Tale, Steven E. Colburn (ed.), University of Michigan Press, 1988. ISBN 0-472-06379-0
- Valby, Elaine, Program Notes: Witches, Ghosts and Fairy Tales, The Phoenix Concerts, 19 January 2014.
- The Victoria Advocate (via Associated Press), "Transformations Hit Opera", 12 August 1978, p. 6D
- Wagner-Martin, Linda (ed.), Critical Essays on Anne Sexton, G. K. Hall, 1989. ISBN 0-8161-8891-2
- Young, Vernon, "Review of Transformations" in Anne Sexton: Telling the Tale, Steven E. Colburn (ed.), University of Michigan Press, 1988. ISBN 0-472-06379-0
