= East Lansing High School =

School in Michigan, United States

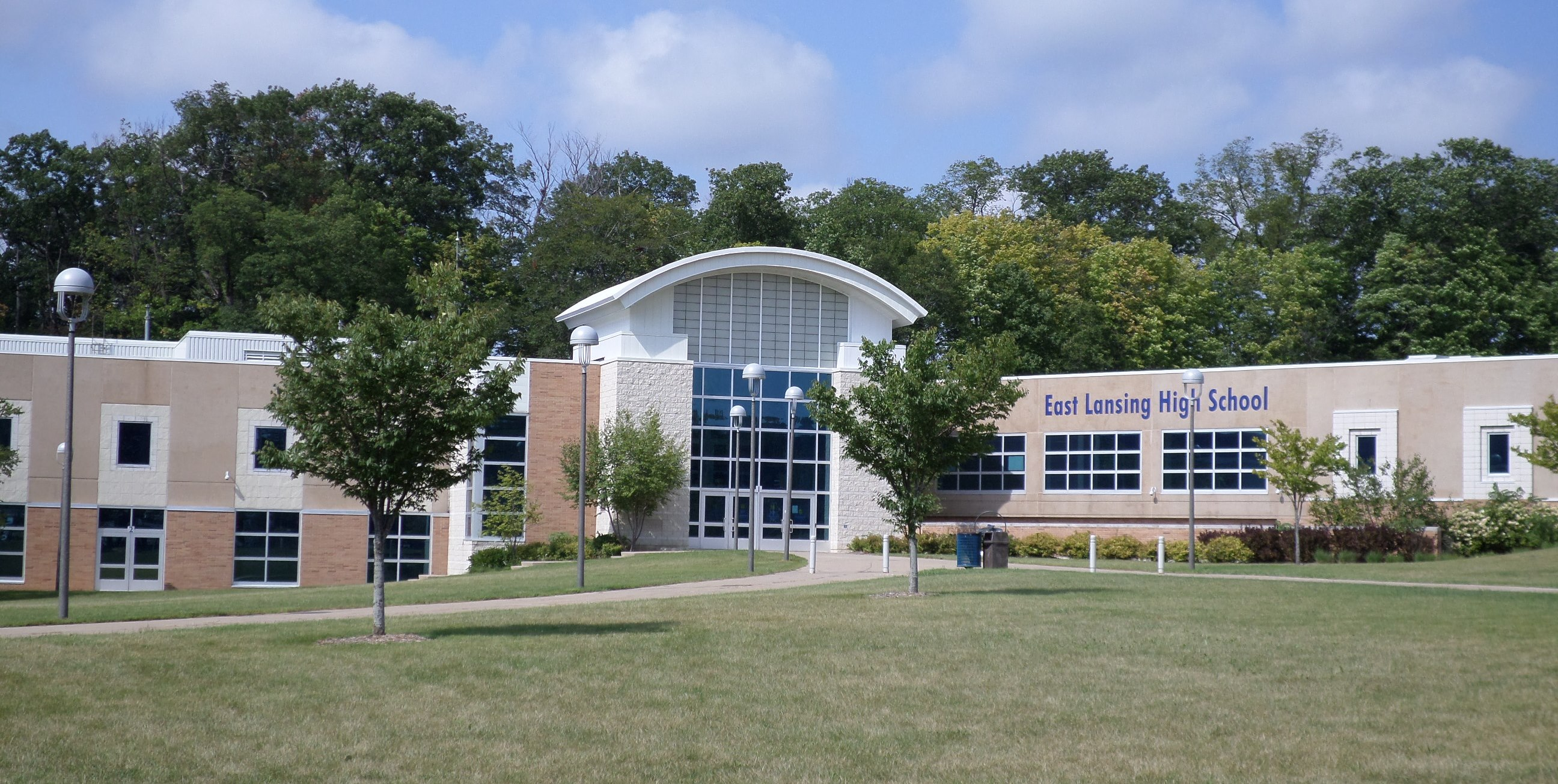
- The front of the school in September 2015

Location
- 509 Burcham Drive; East Lansing, Michigan 48823; United States; 42°44′30″N 84°28′41″W

Information
- Type: Public
- School district: East Lansing Public Schools
- Superintendent: Dori Leyko
- Principal: Ashley Schwarzbek
- Teaching staff: 56.90 (FTE)
- Grades: 9–12
- Enrollment: 1,231 (2024-2025)
- Student to teacher ratio: 21.63
- Colors: Navy blue White
- Fight song: Hail, Trojans, Hail!
- Athletics conference: Capital Area Activities Conference
- Nickname: Trojans
- Newspaper: Portrait
- Yearbook: Ceniad
- Website: elps.us/our-schools/east-lansing-high-school/

Student assessments
- 2021–22 school year Change vs. prior year

M-STEP 11th grade proficiency rates (Science / Social Studies)
- Advanced %: 38.7 / 24.0
- Proficient %: 24.0 / 34.2
- PR. Proficient %: 11.6 / 34.9
- Not Proficient %: 25.7 / 6.8

Average test scores
- SAT Total: 1033.9 (▼ −54.1)

East Lansing High School is a public high school in the city of East Lansing, Michigan, United States. It is managed by the East Lansing Public Schools district.

The school is located about a mile north of the Michigan State University campus. Construction started in 1956, with the school opening in September 1959. The previous high school building is now the Hannah Community Center. From 2000 to 2005, the school underwent a remodeling project that added several new wings and restored the existing ones. The remodeled school was dedicated in September 2005. The school underwent another remodeling project from 2025-2026.

== History ==
The school district that is now East Lansing Public Schools was established in 1900, seven years before the city of East Lansing itself. All grade levels were taught in the original Central School, which was built in 1901. When that building burned down in 1916, classes were held in the old Peoples Church building until a second Central School could be built.

The first high school building was completed in 1926 at 819 Abbott Road. When the current high school building opened in 1959, the former school became the East Lansing Junior High School. It closed for renovation in 1968, and reopened as the John A. Hannah Middle School. The building is now a community center.

== Attendance area ==
The district (and therefore the high school's attendance boundary), mostly in Ingham County, includes much of East Lansing, portions of Lansing and Haslett, and portions of Lansing Charter Township and Meridian Charter Township. A portion of the district is in Clinton County, where it serves portions of the parts of East Lansing in the county, as well as sections of Bath Charter Township.

== Notable alumni ==
- Spencer Abraham: former U.S. Senator and U.S. Secretary of Energy.
- Andrel Anthony: college football wide receiver for the Michigan, Oklahoma, and Duke football programs.
- Amy (Taran) Astley: editor-in-chief of Architectural Digest as of May 2016.
- Charles Bachman: computer scientist.
- David Blum: writer and editor
- Judi Brown(-King): athlete, silver medalist in 400m hurdles in 1984 Summer Olympics.
- Jeff Brubaker: WHA and NHL ice hockey player.
- Timothy Busfield: actor.
- Lin Chambers: NASA scientist.
- Rachael Eubanks: Michigan State Treasurer
- Ralph Evans: concert violinist.
- Sam Green: filmmaker.
- Daniel Gross: author and journalist.
- Matt Hubbard: music producer and musician.
- Brad Jones: American football linebacker for the Green Bay Packers.
- DeJuan Jones: MLS soccer player; 2015 Michigan Gatorade Player of the Year who led East Lansing to back-to-back state championships.
- Martin Kierszenbaum: songwriter and music producer
- Randy Kinder: NFL player for the Green Bay Packers and Philadelphia Eagles.
- William Lawrence: co-founder of the Sunrise Movement and 2026 Democratic candidate for U.S. House in Michigan's 7th congressional district.
- Amos Magee (born 1971): soccer player, coach, and front office
- Steve Maidlow: NFL player for the Cincinnati Bengals and Buffalo Bills.
- Taylor Manson: athlete, bronze medalist in mixed 4x400m relay in 2020 Summer Olympics.
- Todd Martin: tennis player, men's singles finalist in 1994 Australian Open and 1999 US Open.
- Julie Mehretu: artist.
- Donald Gene Miller: serial killer
- Drew Miller: professional ice hockey winger for the Detroit Red Wings.
- Ryan Miller: NHL ice hockey player; Olympic silver medalist, 2010
- Zoe Morse: professional soccer player for the Chicago Red Stars and Brighton & Hove Albion; U.S. youth national team member.
- Taylor Nichols: actor.
- Robert Neller: 37th Commandant of the Marine Corps.
- Aaliyah Nye: WNBA player
- Larry Page: CEO and co-founder of Google Inc.
- Ben Poquette: NBA player.
- Susan May Pratt: actress; appeared in 10 Things I Hate About You, Drive Me Crazy, and Center Stage.
- Eric B. Schoomaker: lieutenant general and 42nd Surgeon General of the United States Army and Commanding General, United States Army Medical Command.
- Peter J. Schoomaker: four-star general and 35th Chief of Staff of the United States Army.
- Nate Silver: sabermetrician who invented PECOTA, editor in chief of FiveThirtyEight.
- Larisa Spielberg: U.S. pairs figure skating bronze medalist in 2000.
- Paul Michael Stoll (born 1985): American-Mexican basketball player
- Farah Stockman: Pulitzer Prize winner in Commentary, 2016.
- Diana Strassmann: economist
- Jeremy Turner: composer and musician.
- Tamara Cofman Wittes: foreign policy expert; president of the National Democratic Institute and former Deputy Assistant Secretary of State for Near Eastern Affairs.

== Athletics ==
The East Lansing High School mascot (male and female) is Troy the Trojan. Depending on sport, the main rivals have variously been the Okemos Chieftains, Lansing Eastern Quakers, Holt Rams or Grand Ledge Comets.

=== Boys ===
- 1936 State Class B Tennis Champion
- 1936 State Class B Golf Champion
- 1938 State Class B Tennis Champion
- 1940 State Class B Track & Field Champion
- 1941 State Class B Track & Field Champion
- 1941 State Class B Golf Champion
- 1948 State Class B Golf Champion
- 1951 State Class B Tennis Champion
- 1958 State Class B Basketball
- 1959 State Class B-C-D Swimming & Diving Champion
- 1967 State Class A Cross Country
- 1981 State Open Class Skiing Champion
- 1983 State Class A Golf Champion
- 1987 State Class A Soccer Champion
- 1987 State Class A Swimming & Diving Champion
- 1991 State Class A Football
- 1993 State Class A Golf Champion
- 1998 State Class A Track & Field Champion
- 2000 State Division II Golf Champion
- 2002 State Division 2 Soccer Champion
- 2005 State Division 2 Soccer Champion
- 2007 State Division 2 Tennis Champion
- 2008 State Division 2 Tennis Champion
- 2011 State Division 2 Track & Field Champion
- 2013 State Division 2 Soccer Champion
- 2014 State Division 2 Soccer Champion
- 2025 State Division 1 Basketball Champion

=== Girls ===
- 1973 State Open Class Swimming Champion
- 1974 State Open Class Swimming Champion
- 1975 State Open Class Swimming Champion
- 1975 State Division 2 Tennis Champion
- 1976 State Class A Swimming & Diving Champion
- 1977 State Class A Swimming & Diving Champion
- 1978 State Class A Swimming & Diving Champion
- 1987 State Open Class Golf Champion
- 1992 State Class A Golf Champion
- 1997 State Division 2 Tennis Champion
- 2009 State Division 2 Track & Field Champion
- 2010 State Class A Basketball Champion
- 2011 State Division 2 Track & Field Champion
