= Oren Brown =

Oren Brown (April 13, 1909 – March 6, 2004) was a well-known and highly successful American vocal pedagogue and voice teacher.

Born in Somerville, Massachusetts, Brown attended Boston University, where he earned a Bachelor of Music with an emphasis in vocal performance and a master's degree in music composition. In 1932 he began his long career as a voice teacher which would last up until his death 72 years later. He notably served as a faculty member of the Mannes College of Music during the late 1940s and was on the voice faculty at the Juilliard School from 1972 through 1991. His students include John Aler, Barbara Brandt, Cecilia, Eva Johansson, James King, and Bo Skovhus, among others.

In 1952 Brown joined the staff of the Washington University School of Medicine, serving as a lecturer in voice therapy and otolaryngology up through 1968. While there he collaborated with medical personnel to develop an interdisciplinary approaches to voice training, making him one of the first vocal pedagogues, along with William Vennard and Ralph Appelman, to introduce contemporary scientific research in the areas of human anatomy and physiology into the study of singing. In addition to contributing articles to a number of music journals, he also is the author of Discover Your Voice: How to Develop Healthy Voice Habits (1996), which is a well-known and highly respected vocal training text.

Brown died in Northampton, Massachusetts at the age of 94.

== Sources ==
- Claudel Callender (November 2, 2004). "The Vocal Legacy of Owen Brown". La Scena Musicale Vol. 10, No. 3.
