= The Tender Land =

Opera with music by Aaron Copland and libretto by Horace Everett

- Opera by Aaron Copland
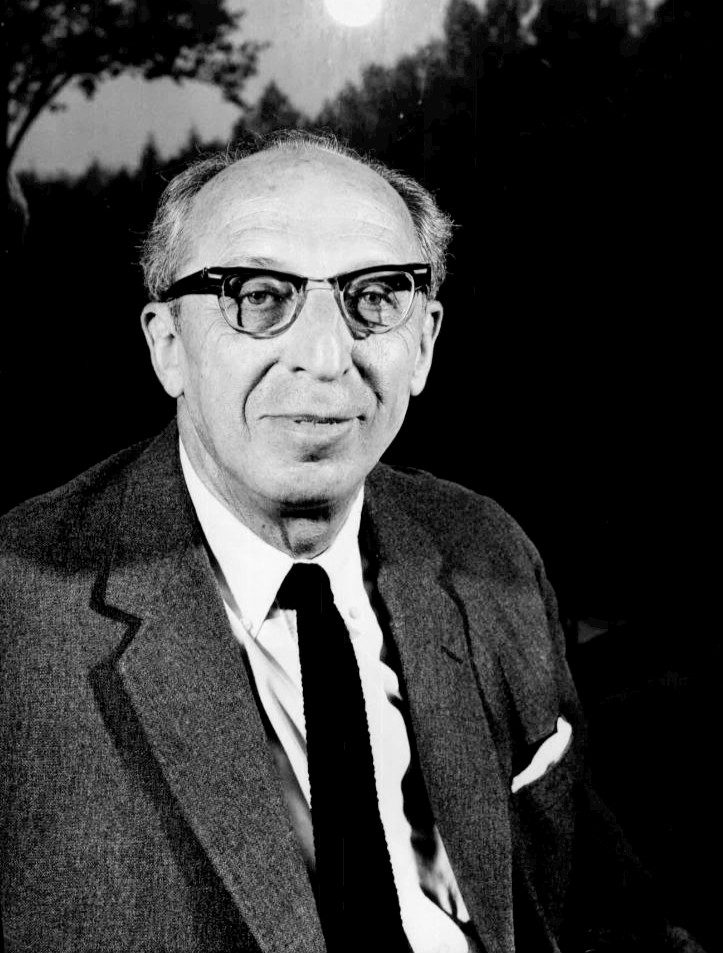
- Aaron Copland in 1962
- Librettist: Horace Everett
- Language: English
- Premiere: April 1, 1954; New York City Center

The Tender Land is an opera with music by Aaron Copland and libretto by Horace Everett, a pseudonym used by Erik Johns, a dancer and Copland's former lover.

== History ==
The opera tells of a farm family in the Midwest of the United States. Copland was inspired to write this opera after viewing the Depression-era photographs of Walker Evans and reading James Agee's Let Us Now Praise Famous Men. He wrote the work between 1952 and 1954 for the NBC Television Opera Workshop, with the intention of its being presented on television. However, the television producers rejected the opera.

Eventually, the work had its premiere on April 1, 1954 at the New York City Opera, with Thomas Schippers as the conductor, Jerome Robbins as the director, and a cast including the young Norman Treigle. It was poorly received, with criticism focused on the weaknesses of the opera's characters and the storyline. Later analysis by Christopher Patton stated that one underlying cause of the opera's failure at the premiere was the contrast between writing for the intimate medium of television, the originally intended medium of the work, versus the more public and larger-scale setting of an opera house.

Patton has also noted the influence of Erik Johns' interest in the Vedanta branch of Hinduism in the libretto. Johns later said:

Yes, [eastern spirituality] certainly had an impact on The Tender Land. For example, in Ma Moss's last aria: "Ends don't end when we have thought them ended." That idea of no real end, it's just a change. That had to do with Vedantic teachings, and the sense of no finality, no end of time, the passage of time is rather an illusion.

Copland and Johns made revisions to the opera, expanding Act 2 for performances at Tanglewood in August 1954, and making further adjustments for Oberlin College in 1955. With the composer's consent, Murry Sidlin re-scored the work with reduced forces - the same scoring as the original 13 instrument version of Appalachian Spring - for a production in New Haven in 1987, a staging that ran for more than 50 performances. Sidlin also added two of Copland's Old American Songs to the central party scene.

On July 28, 1965, the composer conducted a concert version of his work, as part of the French-American Festival, with the New York Philharmonic. In the cast were Joy Clements, Claramae Turner, Richard Cassilly, Norman Treigle, and Richard Fredricks. Three days later, Columbia recorded an abridged version of the opera, again conducted by Copland, at the Manhattan Center, with the same cast. In 2000, Sony released the historic performance on compact disc.

== Roles ==
Role	Voice type	Premiere Cast, April 1, 1954 (Conductor:Thomas Schippers)
Laurie Moss, young girl graduating from high school	soprano	Rosemary Carlos
Martin, itinerant worker	tenor	Jon Crain
Grandpa Moss	bass	Norman Treigle
Ma Moss	contralto	Jean Handzlik
Beth Moss, Laurie's sister	soprano	Adele Newton
Top, itinerant worker	baritone	Andrew Gainey
Mr. Splinters, postman	tenor	Michael Pollock
Mrs. Splinters	mezzo-soprano	Mary Kreste
Mr. Jenks	baritone	Thomas Powell
Mrs. Jenks	soprano	Teresa Gannon

== Synopsis ==
The setting is the 1930s at the Moss family's farm in the mid-western United States, at the time of the spring harvest and also of high school graduation.

=== Act 1 ===
Laurie, the high-school senior daughter of the Moss family, is on the brink of graduating from high school, with a party planned to celebrate that evening. She represents all the hopes and dreams of her provincial family, consisting of a younger sister, Beth, their mother, Ma Moss, and their grandfather (Grandpa Moss). The postman, Mr. Splinters, delivers a package with Laurie's graduation dress. He also brings gossip about a neighbor's daughter being assaulted by two strangers to the area. Ma Moss and Grandpa Moss are worried about this. Two itinerant workers, Top and Martin, arrive on the scene. After initial suspicion, Grandpa Moss agrees to hire Top and Martin to help out with the harvest. Laurie invites the two men to come to her party that evening. Top asks Martin to distract Grandpa Moss by getting him drunk at that evening's party so that he can get closer to Laurie.

=== Act 2 ===
At Laurie's party, following a meal and celebratory toasts, the guests start to dance. Ma Moss suspects that Top and Martin are the two strangers reported to be causing trouble in the area, and tells Mr. Splinters, who goes to tell the local sheriff. As the dance proceeds, Grandpa Moss becomes more drunk. Martin and Laurie dance together and are smitten with one another; they slip off to the porch to share a kiss. Grandpa Moss sees this and becomes angry, and Ma Moss accuses Top and Martin of being the suspects who attacked another local girl. Just then Mr. Splinters arrives with the news that the two suspects have been caught and confessed. Nevertheless, Grandpa Moss orders Top and Martin to leave the next morning.

=== Act 3 ===
Laurie and Martin plan to run away together and she goes to her room to pack. However, Martin starts to question the plan and when Top arrives he persuades Martin to leave without Laurie. The two men slip away. Laurie is at first devastated to find herself abandoned, but then resolves to skip graduation and leave home then and there, pursuing a new life. Ma Moss and Beth try to dissuade her, to no avail. She departs, leaving her weeping family to reassess their hopes, dreams, and plans for the future. Ma Moss turns her focus to her younger daughter.

== Music ==
"The Promise of Living" is best known, often performed as a separate choral anthem.

An orchestral suite based on the opera was compiled by Copland in 1958. In 1996, Murry Sidlin created a new suite, which, like his version of the opera, uses reduced scoring (for soprano, tenor and chamber ensemble).

Copland reused the revivalist song "Zion's Walls" from his second set of Old American Songs in The Tender Land.

== Recordings ==
- Virgin Classics VCD 7 91113-2: Elizabeth Comeaux, Janis Hardy, Maria Jette, LeRoy Lehr, Dan Dressen, James Bohn, Vern Sutton, Agnes Smuda, Merle Fristad, Sue Herber; Orchestra and Chorus of the Plymouth Music Series; Philip Brunelle, conductor
- Koch International Classics 374802: Suzan Hanson, Christine Meadows, Janice Johnson, Kregg Arntson, Milagro Vargas, Amy Hansen, Richard Zeller, Robert MacNeil, Douglas Webster, Scott Tuomi; Third Angle New Music Ensemble conducted by Murry Sidlin (recording of version with reduced scoring)
- Albany - TROY 482/83: University of Kentucky Opera Theatre (Andrea Jones, Dawn Coon, Mary Hawkins, Benjamin Smolder, Judson Perry, Michael Turay, Shederick Whipple, Sherri K. Phelps, Eli Griggs, Charis Strange); Bohuslav Martinu Philharmonic Orchestra conducted by Kirk Trevor

== Productions ==
The first UK production in just under twenty years was staged at Upstairs at the Gatehouse in August 2009, directed by Katherine Hare, conducted by Leigh Thompson and produced by Racky Plews for MadCow Theatre Company.

In Spring 2000, The City of London Sinfonia led by Richard Hickox presented a concert version of The Tender Land at the Barbican.

Northwestern University produced the opera at Cahn Auditorium in Evanston, Illinois on May 18, 19, 20 and 21, 2017. The program credited Boosey & Hawkes. The program stated that Copland had been in residence at Northwestern from February 17 to March 2, 1958 giving "lectures on music and composing". There had been a production conducted by Copland with the Northwestern University Music School on February 28, 1958, also at Cahn Auditorium.

West Chester University produced the opera in spring 2019, using the full orchestra arrangement instead of the 13-piece variant, with credits to conductor Joseph Caminiti and director Elizabeth Manus.

Jacobs School of Music of Indiana University is scheduled to produce the opera on October 17 and 18, 2026.

== In popular media ==
Excerpts from the orchestral suite of The Tender Land appear in the soundtrack of Sid Meier's Civilization V, where they are used as ambient background music. In the game’s “Europe – Peace” music set, two tracks (“The Tender Land, Pt. 1” and “...Pt. 2,”) are included among a broader selection of classical works by Aaron Copland and others.
