= A Quiet Place (opera) =

Opera with music by Leonard Bernstein to a libretto by Stephen Wadsworth

- Opera by Leonard Bernstein
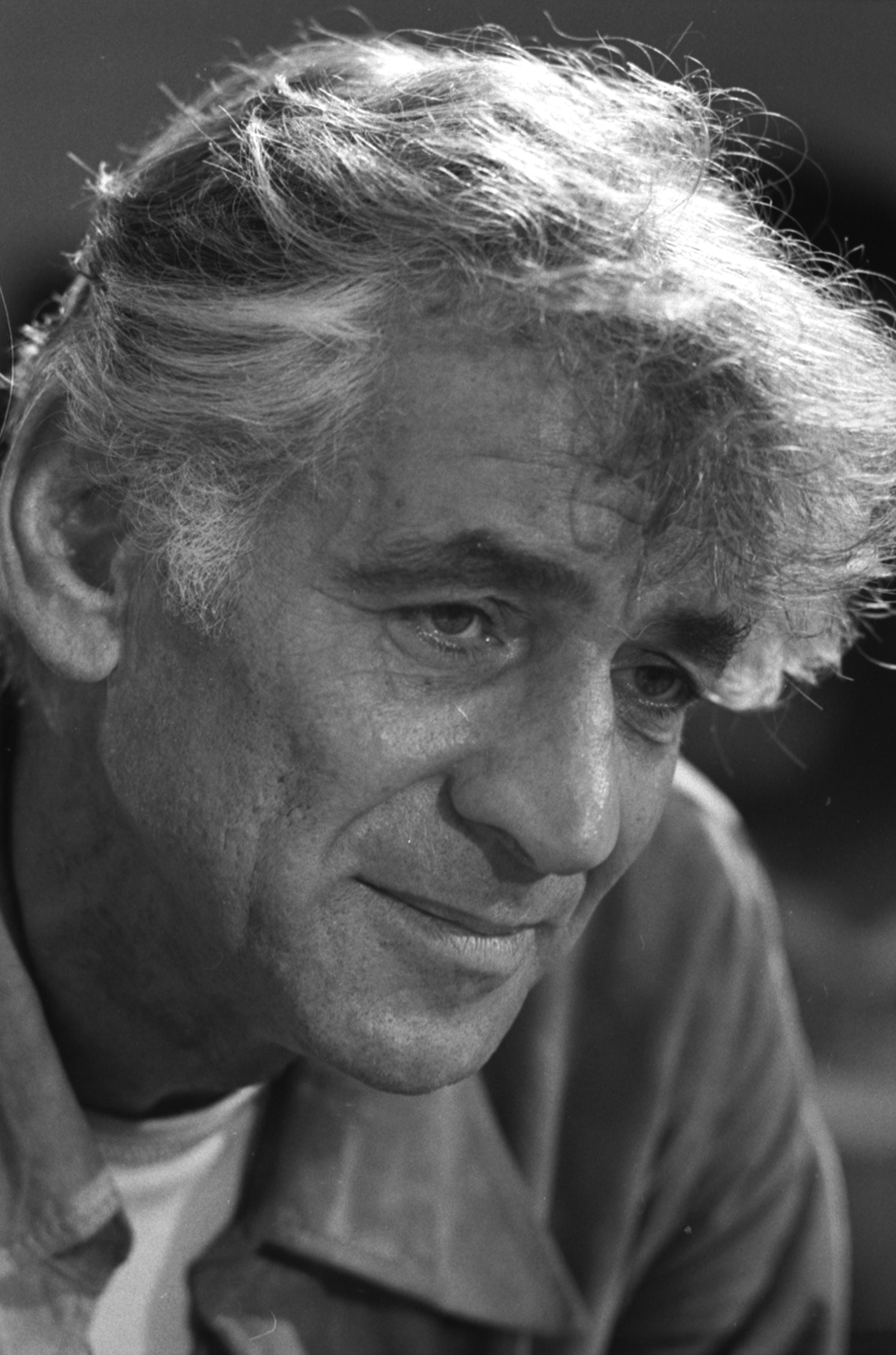
- Bernstein in 1971
- Librettist: Stephen Wadsworth
- Language: English
- Premiere: 17 June 1983; Houston Grand Opera

A Quiet Place is a 1983 American opera with music by Leonard Bernstein and a libretto by Stephen Wadsworth. It is a sequel to Bernstein's 1951 opera Trouble in Tahiti.

In its original form, A Quiet Place was in one act. Bernstein spoke of it as having a Mahlerian four-section structure. The premiere, directed by Wadsworth, and conducted in Houston by John DeMain on June 17, 1983, was a double bill: Trouble in Tahiti, intermission, A Quiet Place.

In its three-act form, act 2 largely consisted of Trouble in Tahiti in flashback. This form, again directed by Wadsworth, appeared in 1984, with John Mauceri conducting in Milan and Washington. It was refined in 1986 for Vienna, where a recording was made and the composer himself conducted.

== Performance history ==
The first performance, attended by Bernstein, was on 17 June 1983 at Houston Grand Opera. From The Washington Post, before the premiere:

Underlying it all is an orchestral fabric in a wide variety of styles that is of truly symphonic density – the opposite of Trouble in Tahiti. Bernstein compared the four-part shape of the opera to a Mahler symphony in an interview with a Houston critic last week. "The opening scene is huge and explosive. The second is elegiac. The third is a playful scherzo", he said. And the last scene is "one of those adagios", referring to the grave and noble slow movements that conclude works like the Mahler Third and Ninth symphonies. "If the opera is saying anything", he said, "it is saying that anything in life is hard to achieve." Then he added, "including this opera".

=== Revisions ===
After being panned by critics – "to call the result a pretentious failure is putting it kindly" – Bernstein and Wadsworth withdrew the opera and revised it. Some scenes were cut, and Trouble in Tahiti was incorporated as two flashbacks, becoming (most of) act 2 of a new three-act structure. This version was given in 1984 at La Scala in Milan and at Washington Opera. The work was revised again and subsequently performed at the Vienna State Opera with the ORF Symphonie Orchester under the composer's baton in April 1986. These performances were recorded by Deutsche Grammophon for commercial release.

=== Later performances ===
The UK premiere was in December 1988 at the Corn Exchange Theatre, Cambridge, with the composer in attendance. In October 2010 New York City Opera presented the New York premiere of the opera (in any version) in a production by Christopher Alden. In contrast to earlier responses, which had been lukewarm, Alden's production drew high praise from both critics and audiences.

== Roles ==
Nota bene: the Opera America source here is misleading. At the premiere, on June 17, 1983, A Quiet Place did not incorporate Trouble in Tahiti but was performed after it, i.e. as a standalone work. Accordingly, the characters Dinah and Young Sam were not part of it. The next year (1984), when the earlier work was interpolated in the later opera in flashbacks, and in 1986 when a Vienna performance was recorded with the composer conducting, these roles could be said to be included, although cast lists still separated them from the four principal roles in A Quiet Place itself: Dede, François, Junior, and (Old) Sam.

Roles, voice types, premiere cast
| Role | Voice type | Premiere cast, 17 June 1983 Conductor: John DeMain | Recording, 1986 Conductor: Leonard Bernstein |
|---|---|---|---|
| Dede, Sam and Dinah's daughter | soprano | Sheri Greenawald | Beverly Morgan |
| François, Junior's boyfriend, later Dede's husband | tenor | Peter Kazaras | Peter Kazaras |
| Junior, Sam and Dinah's son | baritone | Timothy Nolen | John Brandstetter |
| (Old) Sam | baritone | Chester Ludgin | Chester Ludgin |
The following roles in Trouble in Tahiti were performed the same evening, but before A Quiet Place:
| Dinah, Sam's wife | mezzo-soprano | Diane Kesling | Wendy White |
| Sam (as a young man) | baritone | Edward Crafts | Edward Crafts |
| Trio Soprano | soprano | | Louise Edeiken |
| Trio Tenor | tenor | | Mark Thomsen |
| Trio Baritone | baritone | | Kurt Ollmann |

== Synopsis ==
(In the three-act form)

=== Prologue ===
A chorus sings scattered musical phrases such as "My Heart Shall Be Thy Garden", "Cakes and Friends We Choose With Care", and "Lost Time is Never Found". Some of these themes are repeated throughout the opera. Meanwhile, voices are heard in reaction to a car accident. The victim is Dinah, a wife and mother of two.

=== Act 1 ===
Friends and family gather at Dinah's funeral. Among the guests are Dinah's brother (Bill), her best friend (Susie), her psychoanalyst, her family doctor and his wife (Doc and Mrs. Doc), and eventually her children (Dede and Junior). Sam, Dinah's widowed husband, stands immobile and isolated in a corner. People are absorbed in their own thoughts and aren't communicating well. In a series of fragmented conversations, they discuss the circumstances of Dinah's death (the car accident from the prologue), mourn her loss and reveal some of what has happened to her family over the years. Dede and Junior live in Quebec with a French Canadian, François, who had been romantically involved with Junior, and is now married to Dede. Junior, who has a history of mental illness, has not seen his father in nearly 20 years, and Sam has never met his son-in-law.

When everyone except Junior has arrived, the funeral director announces a ceremony of readings and reminiscences. Doc reads from Proverbs, Mrs. Doc from Elizabeth Barrett Browning (lines chosen by Sam); Bill and Susie offer spirited reminiscences of Dinah; Dede reads from Kahlil Gibran – until she breaks down in tears and François must read for her. Junior's unruly entrance interrupts the ceremony, and no one greets him. At the conclusion of the readings the guests file past Dinah's coffin and depart, leaving Sam, Junior, Dede, and François facing one another for the first time.

Sam's first words are to Junior, but give way to an explosion of 30 years' anger, reprisal, and confused grief directed at all three young people. Sam breaks down crying, but no one goes to him. In a trio of reminiscence, Junior, Dede, and François recall – via half-remembered letters home – a long-ago time when they were close with their fathers. Junior breaks the spell of remembering with a snap and accosts his father violently. He starts to rhyme – a symptom of his psychosis – and goads Sam with an improvised strip blues. They come to blows, and the coffin lid is knocked shut with a crash. Sam exits furiously, then Dede and François. Junior, alone, becomes aware of his disarray and tenderly runs his hand across his mother's coffin.

=== Act 2 ===
(Incorporating Trouble in Tahiti) from 1951.

==== Scene 1 ====
At home later that evening, Sam is alone in the master bedroom. Reading Dinah's old diaries makes him angry, but he also feels love for Dinah and realizes that he misses her. The diary evokes a memory of 30 years ago...

==== Scene 2 ====
The scene opens with a scat singing jazz trio which advertises the charms of ideal family life in "Suburbia, U.S.A." of the 1950s. Various prosperous American suburbs are mentioned by name, including Wellesley Hills, Shaker Heights, Highland Park, and Beverly Hills.

In their "little white house", Young Sam and Dinah quarrel at breakfast. Among other issues, she accuses him of having an affair with his secretary at work. After ten years of marriage, every day is the same. They wish they could be kind to each other, but there is no real communication between them.

In his office Young Sam clinches a deal, making a business loan with his customary élan. The jazz trio extols his business acumen and big heart. On her psychiatrist's couch Dinah relates a dream; as she struggled to find her way out of a dying garden, a voice beckoned to her, promising that love would lead her to "a quiet place". Young Sam summons his (unseen) secretary to his office, pointedly asks if he has ever made any passes at her, and takes her quiet demurrals as acquiescence to his version of what happened.

At lunchtime, Young Sam and Dinah have a chance meeting on the street, in the rain. They both pretend to have lunch dates elsewhere, then wonder to themselves why they lied. What has happened, they ask themselves, to dull their love? Can't they find their way back to the garden where they began?

==== Scene 3 ====
Old Sam's reverie is interrupted when Dede comes shyly to visit him. As they go through cartons and clothes in Dinah's closet, they start to reach out to each other. Next door in Junior's room, François confronts Junior with his behavior at the funeral parlor. François' anger provokes a psychotic phase that takes Junior through some painful associations to an important revelation – that he loves and needs his father. Meanwhile, Dede has tried on a dress which vividly recalls to Sam the young Dinah. Father and daughter embrace, Junior collapses in François' arms.

Dede and François meet in the hallway – she is elated, he is exhausted. François breaks down in her arms, overcome by the strain of the day, and Dede comforts him. He is moved by her strength and embraces her passionately. When they leave, Sam goes into Junior's room. He tries to kiss his sleeping son but can't yet: he's still too conflicted. He finds a sports trophy on a shelf, which reawakens his memory...

==== Scene 4 ====
The scene opens as the jazz trio reprises its paean to the American suburban dream.

In that distantly remembered afternoon, rather than going to Junior's school play, Young Sam has competed for a handball trophy and won. As he showers, he proclaims that there are some men, like himself, who are just born winners and some men "who will never, ever win".

Also avoiding Junior's play, Dinah goes to a movie – a trite Technicolor musical called Trouble in Tahiti. She finds it awful and describes it scene by scene, but is increasingly caught up in replaying the cornball plot, especially the big escapist musical number "Island Magic". Suddenly she returns to reality and rushes home to make dinner. Young Sam approaches his front door that night with his trophy, but with dread – even winners "must pay through the nose".

As the jazz trio sings of evening shadows and loved ones together, Young Sam and Dinah try to have a talk after dinner, but they cannot make any headway. Young Sam wearily suggests going to the movies – some new musical about Tahiti. Dinah ruefully agrees. Mourning the lost magic between them, they seek out the "bought-and-paid-for" magic of the silver screen.

Old Sam remembers...

=== Act 3 ===
Dede is up early the next morning, weeding in her mother's once-splendid, now overgrown garden. She senses Dinah's unseen presence and speaks to her, remembering when they were close. Junior, in high spirits, appears with breakfast. Brother and sister play games remembered from childhood and reenact their parents' quarrelsome breakfasts. François joins them in the midst of a tag game, and in another trio of remembrance – for which time stands still – they relive the first meeting of Dede and François some 10 years before.

Now Old Sam appears in the garden and the game of tag resumes. It ends when Sam decides that rather than be tagged by François, he will open his arms to him and welcome him to the family. Sam reads aloud from Dinah's diary. The last entry he reads starts everyone giggling, and they release some of their sadness in shared laughter. The kids tell Sam they are thinking of staying on a few days, and all four euphorically imagine the joys of being together – until a little disagreement becomes a vicious argument. At its climax Junior hurls Dinah's diary into the air, and everything they have achieved since the debacle at the funeral parlor falls down around them. They stop, their anger spent, and look at the pages of the diary scattered on the ground. Thinking of Dinah and of her words, they recognize, one by one, that they can learn to communicate – indeed, that they must – as difficult as it will be for them. They reach out once again to one another.

== Recordings ==
- Deutsche Grammophon 419 761-2: Beverly Morgan, Wendy White, Peter Kazaras, Chester Ludgin, John Brandsetter, Edward Crafts; Jean Kraft; Austrian Radio Symphony Orchestra; Leonard Bernstein, conductor
- Decca John Tessier (tenor), Maija Skille (mezzo-soprano), Claudia Boyle (soprano), Steven Humes (bass), Gordon Bintner (baritone), Annie Rosen (mezzo-soprano), Lucas Meachem (baritone), Joseph Kaiser (tenor), Daniel Belcher (baritone), Rupert Charlesworth (tenor) Choeur de l'Orchestre Symphonique de Montréal, Montreal Symphony Orchestra Kent Nagano Recorded: 2017-05-17
