= Débria Brown =

American operatic mezzo-soprano (1936–2001

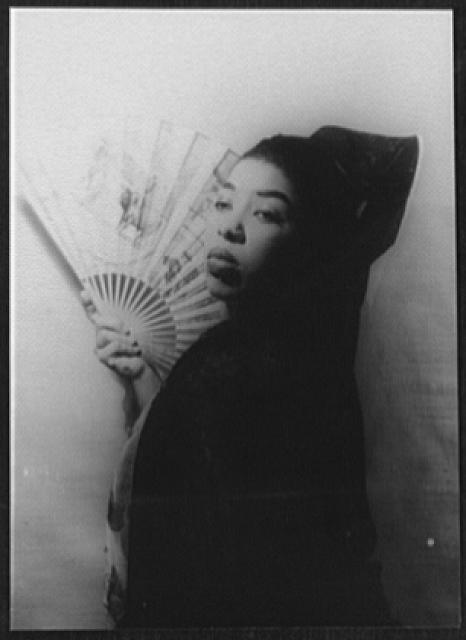
- Brown as Carmen, at the New York City Opera, in 1958; photograph by Carl Van Vechten
- Born: Débria M. Brown; October 26, 1936; New Orleans, U.S.
- Died: December 17, 2001 (aged 65); Houston, Texas, U.S.
- Education: Xavier University of Louisiana
- Occupation: Operatic singer

Débria M. Brown (October 26, 1936 – December 17, 2001) was an American operatic mezzo-soprano who had an active international career that spanned five decades. She was part of the first generation of Black opera singers to achieve wide success and is viewed as part of an instrumental group of performers who helped break down the barriers of racial prejudice in the opera world. She also worked occasionally as a dramatic actress on the stage and on television.

== Education and early career ==
Born on October 26, 1936, in New Orleans, United States, Brown was the daughter of the Reverend Bennett G. and Eunice Brown. She attended Xavier University of Louisiana (Bachelor of Music, 1958), where she sang Cherubino in the only production that Norman Treigle directed, Le nozze di Figaro, in 1957. She later studied with Katherine Dunham in New York City through a scholarship provided by the John Hay Whitney Foundation.

In 1958, Brown made her professional opera debut with the New York City Opera in the title role of Georges Bizet's Carmen, opposite her mentor, Treigle, as Escamillo. Brown returned to the City Opera in 1961, when she created the role of Tituba in the world premiere of Robert Ward's The Crucible, opposite Chester Ludgin.

In 1958, Brown made her Carnegie Hall debut singing the role of Amenofi in the American Opera Society's concert presentation of Gioachino Rossini's Mosè in Egitto with conductor Arnold Gamson, and Boris Christoff in the name part.

== International success ==
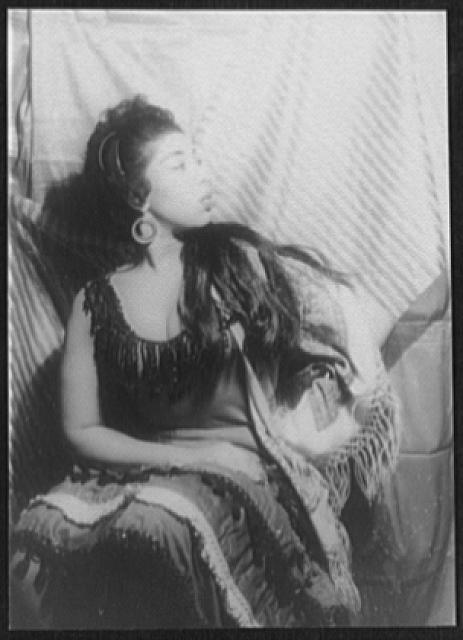
Débria Brown

From 1962 to 1965, Brown was a member of the Stadttheater Aachen, during which time she appeared as a guest artist at numerous opera houses in Germany. She was then committed to the Staatsoper Stuttgart from 1967 to 1970.

In 1969, she appeared as Bess in George Gershwin's Porgy and Bess at the Vienna Volksoper. In 1971 and 1974, she made appearances at the Bregenzer Festspiele. In 1972–1973, she was a member of the Badisches Staatstheater Karlsruhe.

She performed at the Dubrovnik Summer Festival in 1973.

In 1992, Brown became a Professor of Voice and Artist in Residence at the University of Houston. She remained in that position until her death nine years later, on December 17, 2001, aged 65. At the time of her death in Houston, she was still performing, and had further unfulfilled engagements with American opera companies scheduled in the next few seasons. Posthumously, her live 2001 recording of Dominick Argento's Casanova's Homecoming with the orchestra of the Moores School of Music was released by Newport Classic.
