= Shawn Roy =

American opera singer

Shawn Roy is an American operatic bass-baritone and academic. Since 1998, he has served as the head of the opera program at the University of Louisiana at Lafayette.

== Life and career ==
Roy was born and raised in Louisiana. He is a graduate of the University of Southwestern Louisiana (Bachelor of Music Education) and the University of Cincinnati – College-Conservatory of Music (Master of Music in vocal performance and Artist Diploma in Opera).

In 1987 Roy portrayed the title role in the first professional production of Dominick Argento's Christopher Sly with the Center for Contemporary Opera in Manhattan. In 1991, he portrayed Don Bartolo in The Marriage of Figaro with the Virginia Opera, and Don Pippo in Mozart's L'oca del Cairo for his debut with the New York City Opera. With the NYCO he toured North America in 1991-1992, performing the role of the Sacristan in Tosca in 57 cities. In 1992, he returned to the Virginia Opera to perform the title role in Donizetti's Don Pasquale.

In 1995, Roy performed the roles of Alcindoro and Benoit in Puccini's La boheme with the Utah Opera. In 1996, he portrayed the Marchese d'Obigny in La traviata at the Tulsa Opera and appeared as Don Pasquale with the Arizona Opera. In 1997, he made his debut with Opera Omaha as Don Pasquale. He returned to the Utah Opera in 1998 as Dottore Grenvil in La traviata. That same year he was seen at the Sarasota Opera as the Mayor in Leoš Janáček's Jenůfa. Other companies he has sung roles with include the Cincinnati Opera, the Cleveland Opera, the Connecticut Opera, the Fort Worth Opera, and Opera Delaware.
