= Katherine Hare =

British theatre director

- Born: Katherine Elizabeth Hare; 15 April 1978 (age 48); Cambridge, England
- Occupation: Theatre
- Years active: 2000-present

Katherine Elizabeth Hare (born 15 April 1978) is an English theatre director.

== Biography ==
=== Early years ===
Hare was born in Cambridge, England to John Hare, a farmer, and Celia Hare. She was educated at Saffron Walden County High School and University of Hull, where she began her stage career before training at Mountview Academy of Theatre Arts.

=== Career ===
Katherine is a Co-founder of Triptic, a theatre company dedicated to producing lost work of a musical or cultural significance. Recent directing credits include

Bernarda Alba at The Union Theatre
Lights, Camera, Walkies at Gilded Balloon, Edinburgh
The Tender Land by Aaron Copland at Arcola Theatre and The Cochrane Theatre
Crazy For You at The London Palladium
The Beach at The Cockpit Theatre
Modern Dance for Beginners at The Camden People's Theatre
Lucky Stiff at The Robinson Theatre, Cambridge.

As Associate director credits include:

Park Avenue Cat at the Arts Theatre
Hit Me - The Life and Rhymes of Ian Dury at the Garrick Theatre and UK tour
Naked Boys Singing at the Leicester Square Theatre
Dirty White Boy at the Trafalgar Studios
Robin Hood at the Newbury Corn Exchange.

Katherine is also a composer and wrote the original music for Full Tilt's Hamlet at The Minack Theatre.
