= John Aler =

American lyric tenor (1949–2022)

- Born: October 4, 1949; Baltimore, Maryland
- Died: December 10, 2022 (aged 73); Silver Spring, Maryland

John Aler (October 4, 1949 – December 10, 2022) was an American lyric tenor who performed in concerts, recitals, and operas. He was particularly known for his interpretations of the works of Mozart, Rossini, Donizetti, Bellini, and Handel.

== Biography ==
=== Early life and education ===
John Aler was born in Baltimore, Maryland, on October 4, 1949, where he grew up. He attended Catholic University where he studied voice with Rilla Mervine and Raymond McGuire and graduated with a B.A. in music and an M.M. in Vocal Performance. He went on to attend the Juilliard School in New York from 1972 to 1976 where he studied with Oren Brown. During that time he also attended the Berkshire Music Center in Tanglewood for several summers where he studied with Marlena Malas.

=== Career ===
In 1977, he made his operatic debut as Ernesto in Donizetti's Don Pasquale at the Juilliard School's American Opera Center. That same year he won first prizes for men and for the interpretation of French art song at the Concours International de Chant in Paris. He made his Santa Fe Opera debut in 1978 and his European debut as Belmonte in Die Entführung aus dem Serail at the Théâtre de la Monnaie in 1979. Aler made his Covent Garden debut in 1986 as Ferrando in Così fan tutte, returning in 1988 as Percy in Donizetti's Anna Bolena. He sang Mergy in a studio production of Le Pré aux clercs for BBC Radio 3 in 1987.

His other appearances included leading roles at the English National Opera, Deutsche Oper Berlin, the Vienna Staatsoper, Bavarian State Opera, the Salzburg Festival, Hamburg State Opera, Grand Théâtre de Genève, Teatro Real, Opéra National de Lyon, New York City Opera, Opera Theatre of Saint Louis, Washington National Opera, Bayerische Staatsoper, San Diego Opera and Baltimore Opera. He was also a regular performer at major American summer festivals including the Ravinia Festival, the Aspen Music Festival, the Chautauqua Festival, the Newport Music Festival and the Grant Park Music Festival.

In 2000 and 2001, he portrayed Beadle Bamford opposite George Hearn, Patti LuPone, Timothy Nolen, Davis Gaines and Neil Patrick Harris in a concert tour of Sweeney Todd: The Demon Barber of Fleet Street.

Aler sang as a soloist with many orchestras, including the New York Philharmonic, the Cleveland Orchestra, the Philadelphia Orchestra, the Boston Symphony, the Chicago Symphony, the Los Angeles Philharmonic, the Atlanta Symphony, the Cincinnati Symphony Orchestra, the Berlin Philharmonic, the Leipzig Gewandhaus, the Orchestre National de France, the BBC Symphony Orchestra, and the London Sinfonietta.

Aler worked as an associate professor of music and the director of Mason Opera with George Mason University.

== Awards ==
- 1986 Grammy Award, Best Classical Vocal Soloist Performance for "Berlioz: Requiem"
- 1986 Grammy Award, Best Classical Album for "Berlioz: Requiem"
- 1994 Grammy Award, Best Opera Recording for "Handel: Semele"
- 1994 Grammy Award, Best Classical Album for "Bartók: The Wooden Prince & Cantata Profana"
