= Eva Johansson =

Danish operatic soprano (born 1958)

Eva Johansson (25 February 1958) is a Danish operatic soprano.

Born in Copenhagen and educated at Ingrid Jespersens School, Johansson studied at the Royal Danish Academy of Music and then the Copenhagen Opera Academy as well as privately with Oren Brown (New York City) and Susanna Eken (Copenhagen).

She made her debut at the Danish Royal Theater in 1982 as the Countess in Mozart's Le nozze di Figaro, subsequently singing Elektra, Salome and Donna Anna in Mozart's Don Giovanni.

In 1988, Götz Friedrich invited her to perform at the Deutsche Oper Berlin and she has been closely identified with that company ever since. During the period 1988–1993, she sang at the Bayreuth Festival: Elsa in Lohengrin and Freia in Das Rheingold, returning in 2004 to sing Sieglinde in Die Walküre. She made her debut with the Metropolitan Opera in New York City in 1998 as Eva in Die Meistersinger von Nürnberg. In 2000, she appeared at the Los Angeles Opera as Sieglinde. Other engagements have been in Israel, Spain, France, Austria, England, and Japan, working with conductors such as Claudio Abbado, Bernard Haitink, James Levine, Daniel Barenboim, Christian Thielemann, Valery Gergiyev, Simon Rattle and Christoph von Dohnanyi.

As a dramatic soprano, Johansson has concentrated on the operas of Wagner and Strauss, notably Senta in The Flying Dutchman, Elisabeth in Tannhäuser, Isolde in Tristan und Isolde, Brünhilde in both Die Walküre and Götterdämmerung, the Empress in Die Frau ohne Schatten and the title roles of Elektra, Salome and Ariadne auf Naxos.

In 2001, she was made a Berlin Kammersängerin. She has been married to Herwig Oswalder, a viola player with the Deutsche Oper Berlin, since 1994.

== Recordings ==
=== Audio ===
- Gade: Elverskud, Echoes of Ossian Overture / Kitajenko
- Heise: Drot og Marsk with Poul Elming, Bent Norup, Aage Haugland, Danish National Radio Choir and Royal Symphony Orchestra, conducted by Michael Schønwaldt (Chandos)
- Wagner: Das Rheingold / Bernard Haitink
- Wagner: Die Meistersinger von Nürnberg / Deutsche Oper Berlin 1995

=== Video ===
- Strauss: Elektra / Christoph von Dohnányi (DVD)
- Wagner: Das Rheingold / Daniel Barenboim, Bayreuth Festival (DVD)
- Wagner: Die Walküre / Simon Rattle, Berlin Philharmonic (DVD)
- Wagner: Die Meistersinger von Nuernberg / Rafael Frühbeck de Burgos, Deutsche Oper Berlin (DVD)
