= Bo Skovhus =

Danish opera singer (born 1962)

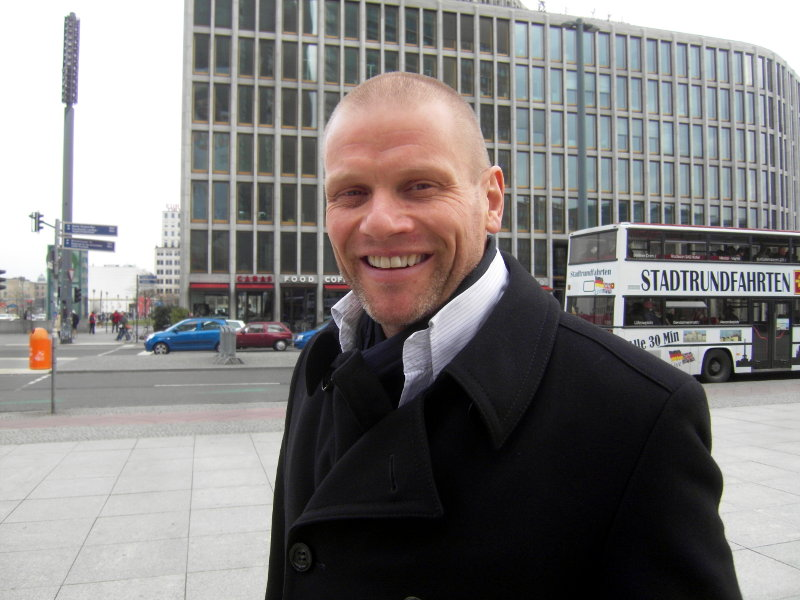
Bo Skovhus, Berlin 2010

Bo Skovhus (born 22 May 1962) is a Danish opera singer (baritone) and voice teacher.

Skovhus studied at the Royal Academy of Music in Aarhus, at the Royal Academy for Opera of Copenhagen and in New York with Oren Brown.

While studying voice at the Royal Academy for Opera of Copenhagen, Skovhus was considering becoming a doctor. Based on a recommendation from his teacher, he was offered the role of Don Giovanni in the Vienna Volksoper's 1988 production of Mozart's Don Giovanni. His debut was a stirring success, and launched his career. He appeared frequently in Vienna, at both the Vienna Volksoper and at the Vienna State Opera. He has sung Lieder as well, for example, Hugo Wolf's Italienisches Liederbuch with Finnish soprano Soile Isokoski (Ondine ODE998-2D).

He signed an exclusive contract with Sony Classical, and has recorded several albums on that label:

- The Heart of the Poet: Songs by Robert and Clara Schumann (1996)
- Schubert: Die Schöne Müllerin (1997)
- Arias (1998)
- Mahler: Das Lied von der Erde (2000)
- Escape Through Opera (2001)

He teaches masterclasses at the American Institute of Musical Studies in Graz, Austria.

== Sources ==
- Bo Skovhus at IMDb
- Bo Skovhus at Sony BMG Masterworks
