= Christopher Sly (opera) =

Opera by Dominick Argento

Christopher Sly is an opera in one act and two scenes and an interlude by composer Dominick Argento. The work uses an English language libretto by John Gay Manlove that is based on William Shakespeare's The Taming of the Shrew. Commissioned by the Mu Phi Epsilon fraternity, the opera was given its world premiere at the Scott Hall Theater at the University of Minnesota on 31 May 1963 under the baton of William Johnson. The premiere cast included tenor Vern Sutton as the Lord.

The Center for Contemporary Opera presented the first professional production of the work in January 1987 at the Harry De Jur Playhouse in New York City. Conductor Richard Marshall led the performance whose cast included Shawn Roy as Christopher Sly, Robert Trentham as the Lord, and Kathryn Fields as Marion Hackett.

== Roles ==
Role	Voice type
Christopher Sly, a tinker	bass-baritone
Henry Pimpernel, a smith	bass-baritone
PeterTurph, a tailor	tenor
Marion Hacket, hostess of the ale-house	mezzo-soprano
A Lord	tenor
A Page	soprano
First Huntsman	baritone
Second Huntsman	tenor
Third Huntsman	bass
First Lady	soprano
Second Lady	soprano
An officer of the Law	spoken
