= Leschetizky =

Leschetizky is a surname. Notable people with the surname include:

- Theodor Leschetizky (1830 – 1915), Polish pianist, composer and professor
- Walter Leschetizky, Austrian former ice dancer
