= David Hamilton (tenor) =

Scottish-born Australian operatic tenor

David Mulvenna Hamilton (born 22 March 1960) is a Scottish-born Australian operatic tenor.

== Career ==
Hamilton studied voice and flute at Napier College in Edinburgh, and at The Royal Scottish Academy of Music and Dance. His teachers included Grant Dickson, Robert Gard and Lillian Liddell.

He moved to Sydney, Australia in 1979. He was a member of the vocal ensemble The Song Company from 1986 to 1991, being a full-time member in 1996. Performances have included the tenor roles in oratorios with all the major orchestras in Australia and New Zealand; he has also performed in the United Kingdom, Germany, Japan and China. His repertoire includes Handel's Messiah, Bach's Passions, Haydn's The Creation, Britten's War Requiem and Elgar's Dream of Gerontius. A review in the Wellington Post wrote about his performance as the Evangelist: "Most remarkable of the soloists was David Hamilton. His words tumbled out as if he was dramatizing a remarkable event of last week with a voice of wide range and power and a particularly arresting top."

On the opera stage, he has performed in the title role of Britten's Albert Herring, Tamino in Mozart's Die Zauberflöte and Loge in Wagner's Das Rheingold. In 2007 he performed at the title role of Wagner's Lohengrin at the Saarbrücken Opera House.

Hamilton has performed at many theatres and festivals, including the Australian Opera in Sydney, the West Australian Opera in Perth, the Queensland Opera in Brisbane, the South Australian Opera in Adelaide, the New Zealand Opera in Auckland, the Wellington Opera in Wellington, New Zealand and the New Zealand Festival. In Europe he has performed at the Scottish Opera in Glasgow and the Edinburgh Festival, and the Halle Handel Festival.
