= The Peoples Church of East Lansing =

Interdenominational Protestant church in Lansing, Michigan

Coordinates: 42.735878°N 84.485625°W

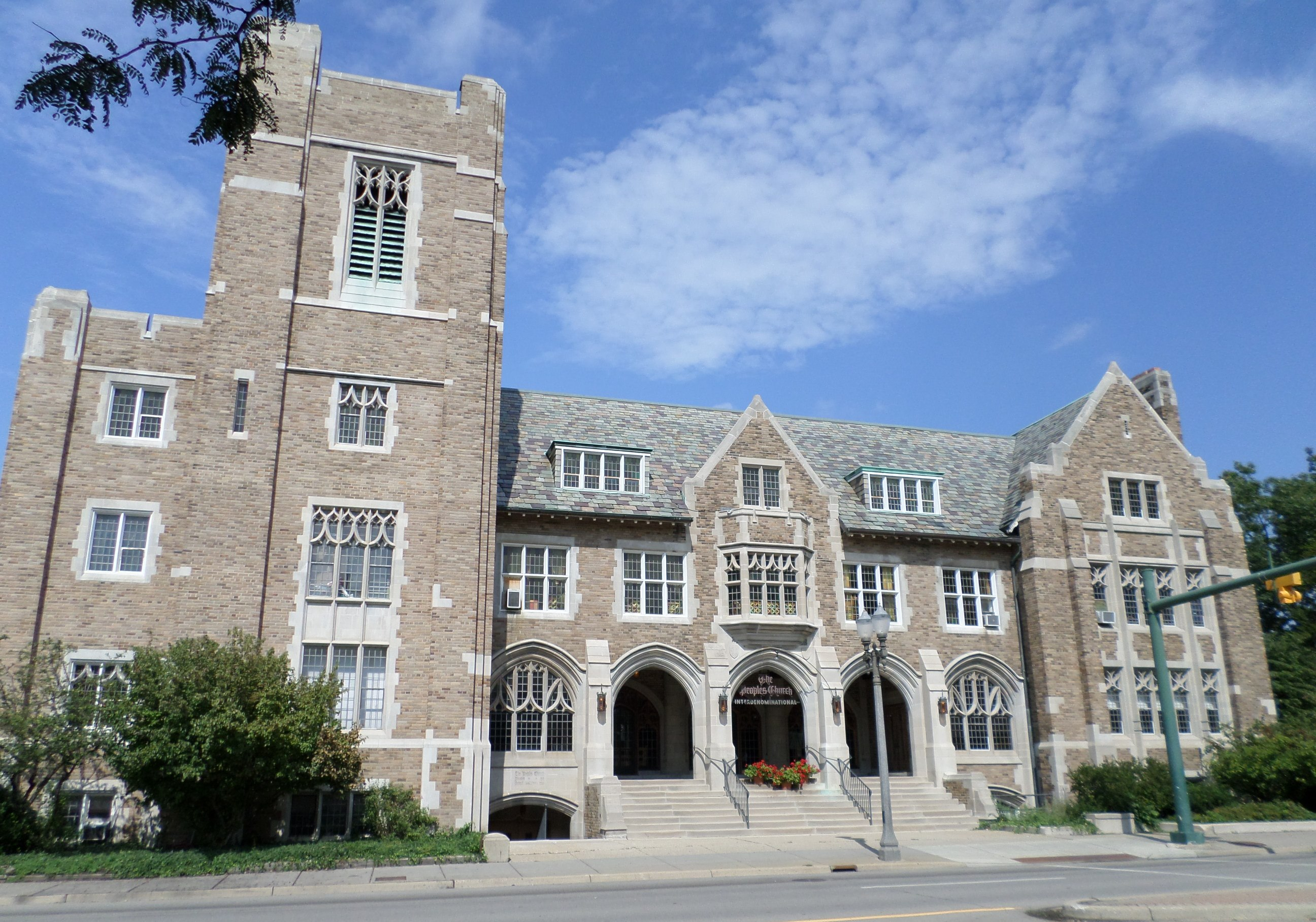
The church in September 2015

The Peoples Church of East Lansing is an interdenominational Protestant congregation located in the city of East Lansing, Michigan. It is officially a member of (in alphabetical order) the American Baptist Churches USA, the Presbyterian Church (U.S.A.), the United Church of Christ, and the United Methodist Church. The congregation's membership currently numbers around 1,300.

Peoples Church preschool offers a NAEYC accredited nature-based curriculum to families of all faiths.

== History ==
The congregation known as The Peoples Church of East Lansing began in 1907 as People's Congregational Church; as indicated by the name, the congregation was in the Congregationalist tradition. The congregation was the only church in East Lansing, Michigan, which was home to the State Agricultural College of Michigan, which would later become Michigan State University.

In 1924, the congregation made the decision to dissolve its organization and reincorporate as "The People's Church (Interdenominational)" (the name would be altered to its current form, sans apostrophe, later). The founding denominational partners in this reincorporation were the local association of Congregational Churches, the Methodist Episcopal Church, the Northern Baptist Convention, and the Presbyterian Church in the United States of America. (Each of these four denominations went through mergers or name changes since 1924, resulting in the current four denominational partners). The re-incorporation of the congregation as fully part of four denominations was one of the earliest such attempts at an interdenominational congregation in the United States, and was thus dubbed "The Great Experiment" by then-pastor Newell McCune. The explicit mission of the congregation stated in the 1924 Articles of Agreement was ministry to the students and faculty of (what was at that point) Michigan Agricultural College.

In 1927, the congregation completed their current church building, located at 200 W. Grand River Ave., on the border of the (recently renamed) Michigan State College campus. The congregation remained the only church in East Lansing until 1940, when St. Thomas Aquinas Catholic Church was formed.

By the mid-1960s, The Peoples Church spun off a daughter congregation on the opposite end of East Lansing. This was originally to be named Edgewood Peoples Church and also affiliated with all four denominations, but in the end would be named Edgewood United Church, affiliated with just the United Church of Christ.

In 1965, the church building suffered a massive fire that originated in the pipe organ. By cutting holes in the sanctuary roof to allow the hot gasses to escape, firefighters were able to save the rest of the building (which surrounded the sanctuary on two sides). Following the fire, the interior of the sanctuary was remodeled in a more contemporary style, including the creation of a prominent stained glass window above the Chancel. During reconstruction an addition was also built to house new church offices.

Around 1988, the southwest corner of the bell tower was struck by lightning and severely damaged. An excellent restoration was soon completed, making the tower good as new, though a close inspection will reveal that the replacement bricks are of a slightly lighter color, perhaps due to their lack of age.

=== Senior Pastors ===
- The Rev. F.W. Corbett (Methodist Episcopal), 1907-09
- The Rev. Robert Goldsmith (Presbyterian), 1909-11
- The Rev. William S. Steenma (Congregationalist), 1910-16
- The Rev. James T. Jones (Congregationalist), 1916-17
- The Rev. Dr. Newell A. McCune (Methodist Episcopal), 1917-49
- The Rev. C. Brandt Tefft (Congregationalist / United Church of Christ), 1949-60
- The Rev. Dr. G. Wallace Robertson (Presbyterian), 1960-76
- The Rev. Dr. Jack Boelens (Presbyterian), 1977-79
- The Rev. Dr. Richard C. Devor (United Methodist), 1980-84
- The Rev. Dr. Richard E. Murdoch (Presbyterian), 1984-94
- The Rev. Michael L. Dunkelberger (Presbyterian), 1996-98
- The Rev. Dr. Harry H. Johnson (Presbyterian), 2000-2010
- The Rev. Dr. Andrew D. Pomerville (Presbyterian), 2011-2018
- The Rev. Dr. Shawnthea Monroe (United Church of Christ), 2019-present

== Current Life ==
While no longer, in some sense, the university church, The Peoples Church of East Lansing remains a prominent congregation in the Greater Lansing-East Lansing area.

The Peoples Church of East Lansing is the officially supported campus ministry to Michigan State University for both the Presbyterian Church (U.S.A.) and the United Church of Christ.

Current Pastoral Staff include:

- Rev. Dr. Shawnthea Monroe (United Church of Christ), Senior Pastor
- Rev. Penny Swartz (United Church of Christ), Associate Pastor
- Rev. Dr. Devon Herrell (Methodist), Associate Pastor
