= Lowell Liebermann =

American composer, pianist and conductor (born 1961)

- Born: Lowell Liebermann; February 22, 1961 (age 65); New York, New York, U.S.
- Occupations: Composer; conductor; pianist
- Known for: Sonata for Flute and Piano and Gargoyles for piano
- Website: www.lowellliebermann.com

Lowell Liebermann (born February 22, 1961) is an American composer of contemporary classical music, pianist and conductor. Although sometimes described as a neo-romantic composer, Liebermann has expressed unease with the label. Among his better known works are his flute compositions, particularly the Sonata for Flute and Piano, as well as Gargoyles for piano.

== Early life and education ==
Lowell was born on February 22, 1961 in New York City, USA. Liebermann began piano lessons at the age of eight and began composing shortly after. He credits his second piano teacher, Ada Sohn Segal (a Leschetizky student) with instilling a love of music in him. At the age of 13 he declared his desire to be a composer and at the age of 14 began composition lessons with Ruth Schonthal, a Hindemith pupil. He composed his first Piano Sonata at the age of 15 and performed it at Carnegie Recital Hall a year later. He continued his studies at the Juilliard School, where he received a BM, MM and DMA, studying composition with David Diamond and Vincent Persichetti and piano with Jacob Lateiner. He also studied conducting privately with Laszlo Halasz and spent a year between his Bachelor and master's degrees serving as assistant conductor to Halasz.

== Career and works ==
One of Liebermann's earliest successes was the Sonata for Flute and Piano Op.23, commissioned by the Spoleto USA Festival for flautist Paula Robison and pianist Jean Yves Thibaudet, a work which has gone on to become one of the most frequently performed sonatas in the flute repertoire. This was followed soon after by his Gargoyles Op.29 for piano, a work which has become a staple of the solo piano repertoire. The Steinway & Sons piano company commissioned Liebermann's 2nd Piano Concerto to celebrate the 500,000th Steinway piano built, and that work had its premiere at the Kennedy Center in 1992 with Stephen Hough as pianist and Mstislav Rostropovitch conducting the National Symphony. It was subsequently recorded along with Liebermann's 1st Piano Concerto for Hyperion with Hough and the composer conducting the BBC Scottish Symphony and was nominated for a Grammy in the Best Contemporary Classical Composition category. The success of Liebermann's Flute Sonata led flautist Sir James Galway to commission Liebermann's Concerto for Flute and Orchestra Op.39, followed by commissions for the Concerto for Flute, Harp and Orchestra Op.48 as well as the first Trio for Flute Cello and Piano. Galway subsequently recorded Liebermann's concertos for Flute, Piccolo and Flute & Harp with Liebermann conducting the London Mozart Players. Liebermann's first opera (for which he also served as librettist) The Picture of Dorian Gray was the first American opera commissioned and premiered by the Monte Carlo Opera, in 1996. In 1999 Liebermann was appointed as composer-in-residence with the Dallas Symphony, a residency which included the premiere of his 2nd Symphony, commissioned for the orchestra's centennial in 2000. That concert marked the first time a major orchestra broadcast a concert over the internet. In 2001 Liebermann was the Grand Prize winner of the Inaugural American Composers Invitational of the 11th Van Cliburn International Piano Competition, after the majority of semi-finalists chose to perform Liebermann's work Three Impromptus Op.68 for their final round recitals. Liebermann's second opera, Miss Lonelyhearts, to a libretto by J.D. McClatchy based on Nathanael West's novel, was commissioned by The Juilliard School as the final event in its centennial celebration. In 2012 Liebermann was invited to join the composition faculty of the Mannes College of Music at which time he became the founding conductor of MACE (Mannes American Composers Ensemble), a large ensemble devoted to the works of living American Composers. A year later, Liebermann was appointed head of the composition department, a position he held for five years. In 2014, Liebermann became the first recipient of the Virgil Thomson Award, a $40,000 prize given jointly by the American Academy of Arts and Letters and the Virgil Thomson Foundation, for the entirety of his vocal output.

The Royal Ballet, Covent Garden and San Francisco Ballet jointly commissioned Liebermann's first full-length ballet, Frankenstein, premiered in London in 2016. In 2020, Liebermann was commissioned by Steinway & Sons for a second time, to compose a work for piano duet which was presented as a wedding present to the pianists Lang Lang and Gina Alice Redlinger after their wedding at the Palace of Versailles in Paris.

Liebermann's catalogue of works runs to 150 opus numbers, including 4 Symphonies; 3 Piano Concertos and a Rhapsody On a Theme of Paganini for piano and orchestra; concertos for violin, cello, clarinet, organ, alto saxophone and trumpet; chamber works including 3 piano trios, a quartet and quintet for piano and strings; 5 cello sonatas and 6 string quartets; works for solo piano including 4 Piano Sonatas and twelve Nocturnes; and many works for voice with piano or chamber combinations.

== Musical characteristics ==
Liebermann has cited as early compositional influences Bach, Beethoven, Britten, Shostakovich, Frank Martin, Fauré and Busoni. (Note: Although Liebermann dedicated his Piano Concerto No. 1 to English composer Kaikhosru Shapurji Sorabji, he insists that Sorabji did not influence his own music.) Liebermann's music has been described by some critics as "neo-romantic," while critic Terry Teachout included Liebermann in a group of composers he dubbed "The New Tonalists". Liebermann has at times expressed his discomfort with these labels. Richard Freed in the Grove Dictionary gives a more nuanced assessment of Liebermann's style: "Liebermann's music is notable for its stylistic resourcefulness and polished craftsmanship. It resists definition with any particular school of composition. While his earliest works were chromatic and contrapuntal in texture, often verging on atonality, the Sonata notturna (1983) brought clearer harmonic direction, with an emphasis on formal articulation and thematic unity." Liebermann's music is indeed often tonal (although it sometimes does not fit easily into traditional harmonic patterns; tonality often seems employed more for its coloristic value than for its functionality) but also employs bitonality, atonality, modalism, aspects of serialism and makes use of octatonic and other synthetic scales. Baker's Biographical Dictionary of Musicians concludes that Liebermann's "output demonstrates a deft handling of both traditional and modern elements in an accessible style".

== Awards ==
- 1978: National Winner, Music Teachers National Association for Piano Sonata No.1
- 1978: Fred Waring Choral Award from the National Federation of Music Clubs for Two Choral Elegies
- 1980: Charles Ives Scholarship (Charles Ives Prize), American Academy and Institute of Arts and Letters
- 1982: Outstanding Composition Award, Yamaha Music Foundation, for Piano Sonata No.1
- 1986: Grand Prize, Delius Composition Competition for War Songs
- 1986: First Place Victor Herbert/ASCAP Award for Sonata for Viola and Piano
- 1986: Devora Nadworney Award for Three Poems of Stephen Crane
- 1986: BMI Student Composers Award for Symphony No.1
- 1988: Winner, Julliard Orchestral Competition for Symphony No.1
- 1990: Charles Ives Fellowship from the American Academy and Institute of Arts and Letters
- 1990: ASCAP Young Composer Competition for Concerto for Violin, Piano and String Quartet
- 1997: Grammy Nomination in "Best Classical Contemporary Composition" category for Piano Concerto No.2
- 1998: GLAMA Award in "Contemporary Classical Composer" category for Concerto for Flute and Orchestra
- 2001: Grand Prize 1st American Composers Invitational of the Van Cliburn Competition for Three Impromptus Op.68
- 2010: Winner, Newly Published Music Competition, National Flute Association, for Night Music Op.109
- 2014: Inaugural recipient of the Virgil Thomson Award in Vocal Music given by the American Academy of Arts and Letters and the Virgil Thomson Foundation
- 2014: Concert Artists Guild CAG Virtuoso Award
- 2016: Barto Prize for Nocturne No.8
