= Desto Records =

American record label

- Founded: 1951
- Founder: Horace Grenell
- Country of origin: United States

Desto Records was an American record label. It was founded in 1951 by Horace Grenell who had a mail order business of selling children's records and was looking to expand genres.

The first issue was a three disc edition of The Beggars Opera. It released albums sporadically over the next decade, but in 1964 expanded to become one of the main distributors of contemporary classical music by American composers.

Artists published included Dominick Argento, Leslie Bassett, Jack Beeson, Luciano Berio, Henry Brant, Henry Cowell, George Crumb, Norman Dello Joio, Irving Fine, Lou Harrison, Charles Ives, Ulysses Kay, Ezra Laderman, Otto Luening, Peter Mennin, Gian Carlo Menotti, Douglas Moore, Lawrence Moss, Ned Rorem, Gunther Schuller, Roger Sessions, Joel Spiegelman, William Grant Still, William Sydeman, Randall Thompson, Vladimir Ussachevsky, and Charles Wuorinen.

In 1974 Grenell sold the label to the owners of CMS Records of Mount Vernon, New York. The two companies were merged and the label was discontinued in 1982.

== See also ==
- List of record labels
