= Conrad Susa =

American classical composer

Conrad Stephen Susa (April 26, 1935 – November 21, 2013) was an American composer. Born in Springdale, Pennsylvania, Susa studied at the Carnegie Institute of Technology and the Juilliard School, where his teachers included William Bergsma, Vincent Persichetti and, by his own claim, P. D. Q. Bach, the fictitious spoof character created by American composer Peter Schickele.

He was an organist at Springdale High School.

From 1959 to 1994, Susa was composer-in-residence for the Old Globe Theater (San Diego, California), where he wrote incidental music for over 200 productions there. In 1988, he joined the faculty of the San Francisco Conservatory of Music, and remained there as a professor of composition until his death.

Susa became particularly known for his 5 operas. His 1973 chamber opera, Transformations, set to texts from the poems of Anne Sexton, is one of the most frequently performed operas by an American composer. His other compositions include choral works and incidental music for various plays. His music is published by the E.C. Schirmer Music Company.

== Selected works ==
Operas

- Transformations (1973)
- Black River (1975, revised 1981)
- The Love of Don Perlimplin (1984)
- The Wise Women (1994)
- The Dangerous Liaisons (1994, revised 1996–97)

Other works

- Hymns for the Amusement of Children (1972)
- Carols and Lullabies: Christmas in the Southwest (1992)
