= Minnesota Opera =

Opera company based in Minneapolis, Minnesota, United States

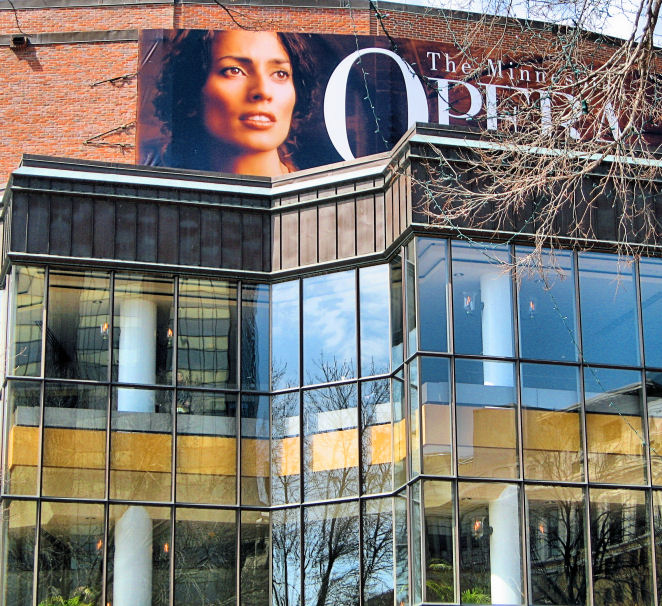
- Formation: 1963
- Type: Theatre group
- Location: Minneapolis, Minnesota

Minnesota Opera is a Pulitzer prize-winning performance organization based in Minneapolis, Minnesota. It was founded as the Center Opera Company in 1963 by the Walker Art Center. The President and General Director is Ryan Taylor. The Minnesota Opera has consistently taken risks including commissioning new works and incorporating the work of emerging artists.

Performances are given at the Ordway Center for the Performing Arts in Saint Paul, Minnesota. According to OPERA America, the company is the 13th largest opera company in the United States.

== History ==
Initially founded by the Walker Art Center in 1963 with funding provided by the Rockefeller Foundation, the Minnesota Opera Company's performances were held at the Guthrie Theater in Minneapolis (which was also founded by the Walker). The Company's initial founders included Martin Friedman (museum director), Walker Art Center's director. It's focus was on contemporary opera, including the hiring of visual studio artists such as Robert Indiana to create the costumes and scenery, under the long-time stage direction of Wesley Balk. In 1968 the company separated from the Walker and became an independent company.

== Works ==
All performances of the company are in the English language, and include commissioned works. In its first year, Minnesota Opera performed Britten's "Albert Herring," followed by a double bill consisting of "A Masque of Angels" by University of Minnesota faculty member Dominick Argento and John Blow's "Venus and Adonis".<

In 1971 the company (still called Center Opera Company) performed "Faust Counter Faust" in San Francisco, California during its first national tour. The company also toured around Minnesota that year with a production of Gertrude Stein's The Mother of Us All.

A number of operas have also received their American premieres at the Minnesota Opera, including The Handmaid's Tale, Postcard from Morocco, Armida, The Elephant Man, and The Fortunes of King Croesus. The American premiere of Jonathan Dove's Pinocchio was presented in February 2009.

The companny is known for premiering such diverse works as Where the Wild Things Are by Oliver Knussen (based on the children's novel by Maurice Sendak), Frankenstein by Libby Larsen (based on the novel by Mary Shelley), and The Fix – based on the story of Shoeless Joe Jackson, the Chicago White Sox, and their attempt to fix the world series. with music by Joel Puckett and libretto by Eric Simonson.

A complete list of productions appears on the company's web site

== Non-standard repertoire ==
While much from the standard repertoire is performed, the company has distinguished itself with productions of some unusual and rare operas in the last decade.

These include The Pearl Fishers; Casanova's Homecoming by Argento; and Roberto Devereux by Donizetti during the 2009/10 season; Pinocchio by Dove in the 2008/09 season; The Fortunes of King Croesus (Keiser) and Rusalka in 2007/08; Rossini's La donna del lago and Offenbach's The Tales of Hoffmann. The Grapes of Wrath by Ricky Ian Gordon was given its world premiere in the 2006/07 season after being commissioned by the company. Léo Delibes's Lakmé appeared during that season as well.

The 2005/06 season saw several American premieres, including Orazi e Curiazi by Saverio Mercadante and Joseph Merrick, the Elephant Man (Petitgirard). In 2004/05 season, the company presented Donizetti's Maria Padilla and Nixon in China by John Adams. Donizetti's Lucrezia Borgia and Passion by Stephen Sondheim appeared in 2003/04 while the previous season saw another American premiere, The Handmaid's Tale by Poul Ruders. In 2001/02 Mozart's La clemenza di Tito and Mark Adamo's Little Women provided a contrast. Early in the decade, Vincenzo Bellini's The Capulets and the Montagues and Kurt Weill's Street Scene were highlights of the 2000/01 season.

In 2011, Bernard Herrmann's sole opera Wuthering Heights was presented. The full opera has yet to receive a staging, as the official world premiere by Portland Opera in 1982 was abridged by some 30 minutes.

In 2011, Minnesota Opera produced Silent Night by composer Kevin Puts and librettist Mark Campbell, an MN Opera commission that won the 2012 Pulitzer Prize in Music. In 2013, Minnesota Opera commissioned the opera Doubt by composer Douglas J. Cuomo and librettist John Patrick Shanley.

In March 2015, the company gave the premiere performance of Kevin Puts' opera The Manchurian Candidate (based on Richard Condon's novel, with libretto by Mark Campbell).

In May 2016, Minnesota Opera produced The Shining, a newly commissioned American opera in two acts with music by composer Paul Moravec and a libretto by Mark Campbell, based on the novel by Stephen King. It is part of the 'New Works Initiative' of Minnesota Opera.

In February 2025, Minnesota Opera produced The Snowy Day, an hour-long production with music by composer Joel Thompson and a libretto by Andrea Davis Pinkney, based on The Snowy Day by Ezra Jack Keats.
