= Scott Joiner =

American singer and composer (born 1982)

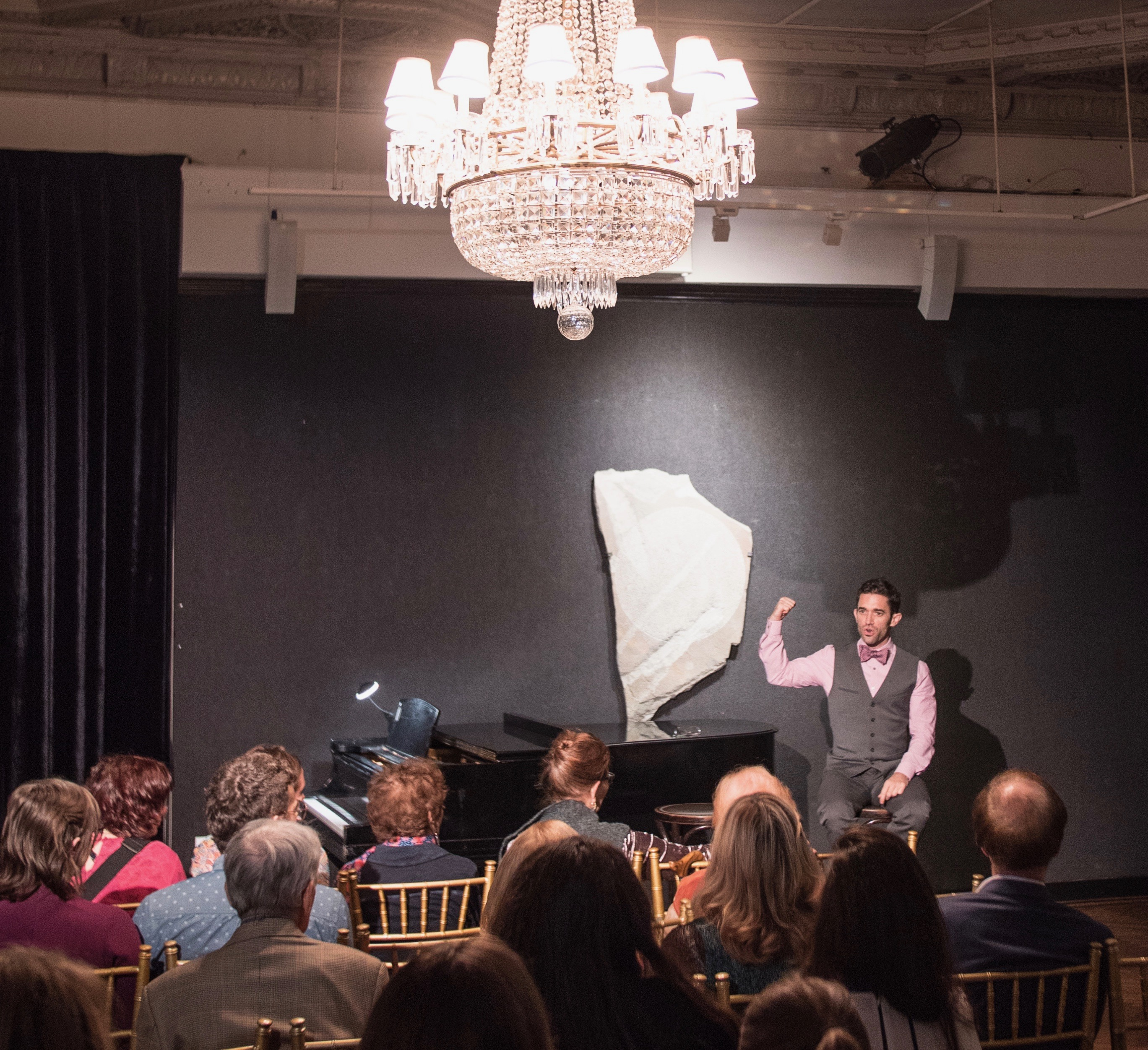
- Scott Joiner discusses his work in opera at the National Arts Club
- Born: May 11, 1982; Boulder, Colorado, U.S.
- Occupations: Singer, composer

Scott Joiner is an American singer, composer, teacher and conductor. He created the role of Dickon in the world premiere of Nolan Gasser's opera The Secret Garden with the San Francisco Opera and Cal Performances in 2013. Among his five one-act music theater pieces, The Shower was presented at the Wiener Kammeroper in 2019, and Death of a Grailsman received a YouTube premiere in 2021. He composed the score and starred in the short opera film, Connection Lost (The Tinder Opera) or L'opera di Tinder, which won Best Score at Ireland's Kerry Film Festival. The miniature one-act opera received its live stage premiere by Opera Carolina in November 2016 as part of National Opera Week. Joiner and Tinder Opera Co-creator, Adam Taylor (writer/director) were featured on NPR's All Things Considered in 2017.

During the pandemic of 2020, Joiner was a featured vocalist for GRATEFUL, The Songs of John Bucchino 20th Anniversary Virtual Concert along with Leslie Odom Jr., Stephen Schwartz, Corey Cott, Mykal Kilgore, Ann Hampton Callaway, Toni Tennille, Amanda McBroom, and Andrea Marcovicci. Joiner also performs as a jazz pianist and his body of work includes compositions for piano, vocal, choral and chamber music ensembles. In 2021 Minton's Cabaret presented the retrospective, The Sounds of Scott Joiner, featuring Jessica Fishenfeld, Edward Hardy and others. Since 2023 he has been music director and choral conductor at the Chadwick School in Los Angeles, a position he previously held at Savannah Country Day School. He has been a music director for the Musical Theatre Conservatory at Barrington Stage Company where his most recent piece, Being Here, was premiered in 2025. He is the artistic executor and definitive biographer of the composer and music critic Eric Salzman (1933–2017), a pioneer in the concept of New Music Theater.

== Vocal career ==
Joiner is a graduate of Interlochen Arts Academy and the Manhattan School of Music (BM '05, MM '07, DMA '19) with additional graduate studies at Teachers College, Columbia University. At MSM, studying under tenor Neil Rosenshein, he performed the role of Chevalier de Danceny in Conrad Susa's The Dangerous Liaisons conducted by George Manahan; collaborated with the Escher String Quartet and artists such as Marcus Paus, Wang Jie, Ted Hearne and Jeanine De Bique; and appeared in a live stream master class with Thomas Hampson broadcast on Medici.tv. He studied acting at Michael Howard Studios. Joiner was the 2011 winner of the Heafner-Williams Vocal Competition and won the Middle/East Tennessee district of the Metropolitan Opera National Council Auditions (2011) when the judges included soprano Diana Soviero.

Growing up in Colorado (where his grandfather, Richard Joiner had been clarinetist of the Colorado Symphony Orchestra), Joiner had toured nationally and internationally as a boy soprano in the Colorado Children's Chorale, under the direction of Duain Wolfe. Through his connection to Wolfe, Joiner was invited to sing the boy soprano role of Erster Knabe in Mozart's Die Zauberflöte at Central City Opera conducted by John Moriarty and the roles of Harry in Albert Herring and the Shepherd Boy in Tosca at Opera Colorado, directed by Nathaniel Merrill. As a tenor, his first professional roles were with Asheville Lyric Opera, including Ferrando (Così fan tutte), Nemorino (L'elisir d'amore), Tamino (Die Zauberflöte), Goro (Madama Butterfly), and Basilio / Don Curzio (Le nozze di Figaro). While in North Carolina, he appeared as soloist with the Asheville Symphony Orchestra under the baton of Daniel Meyer in Gerald Finzi's For St Cecilia (broadcast live on WCQS Radio), Handel's Messiah, Mozart's Requiem, scenes from West Side Story and Holiday Pops Concerts. In 2011 he was a fellow at the Wintergreen Music Festival and created the operatic one-man show, Shakespeare Sings! with spoken word and musical settings of Shakespeare (co-conceived and directed by Francis Cullinan).

In the 2016/2017 season Joiner made his Carnegie Hall debut as Piemonteser in Richard Strauss' Friedenstag with the American Symphony Orchestra under Leon Botstein, returning to Carnegie Hall as the tenor soloist in the New York Premieres of Howard Goodall's Eternal Light: A Requiem and Mark Hayes' International Carol Suites with Distinguished Concerts International (DCINY). His most prominent Carnegie Hall appearance came as the tenor soloist for the US Premiere of Patrick Hawes's The Great War Symphony conducted by the composer on Veterans Day, on the 100th Anniversary of the Armistice. Other notable performances include the San Francisco Opera premiere of the Secret Garden with music by Nolan Gasser and a libretto by Carey Harrison, the role of Edoardo in the North American premiere of Riccardo Zandonai's Il grillo del focolare with Teatro Grattacielo, soloist in the North American premiere of Derek Deane's Strictly Gershwin with the Tulsa Ballet (and Tulsa Symphony) led by Gareth Valentine, and performances with Knoxville Opera, the Center for Contemporary Opera (Edward Rochester in Louis Karchin's Jane Eyre), Colorado Music Festival, American Opera Projects (as Young Gulliver in the world premiere of Victoria Bond's Gulliver's Travels), Helena Symphony Orchestra, New York International Fringe Festival and the Cutting Edge Concerts New Music Festival at Symphony Space, where he created the title role in the 2018 world premiere of Eric Salzman's Big Jim & the Small-Time Investors.

Joiner sang the role of Tamino in Die Zauberflöte conducted by Christian Schulz at the Odeon Theater Wien as Artist-in-Residence for the 2018 Vienna Summer Music Festival, and was a 2018 Festival Artist with Sherrill Milnes' Savannah VOICE Festival. In 2019, Joiner debuted the role of Ernesto in Donizetti's Don Pasquale with the North Shore Music Festival at the historic Castle Gould; performed in the Season Opening Gala of City Lyric Opera at New York's Steinway Hall; and performed with On Site Opera.

== Composition ==
Joiner has composed five short one-act operas as well as numerous other works for combinations of voice, orchestra, chorus and piano. The Vienna Summer Music Festival premiered Joiner's fifth one-act opera, The Shower, in June 2019 at the Wiener Kammeroper, conducted by Ian Niederhoffer and directed by Jennifer Davison. Rather than taking formal composition lessons, Joiner learned aspects of composition from advanced studies in music theory, jazz piano studies, and from his own performances as a vocalist in many premieres and workshops.

Filmmaker Adam Taylor approached Joiner about making a short opera film in 2015 and Connection Lost (The Tinder Opera) was released on April 18, 2016. The work received a positive review from Schmopera.com and was an official selection of the Orlando Film Festival, the Nickel Film Festival and many others. It was also screened at Cinemartini at The Downtown Independent in Los Angeles. The film won Best Musical Comedy Short in the Inaugural London-Worldwide Comedy Short Film Festival and was presented at the cell Theater in NYC by the Center for Contemporary Opera along with the live US premiere of Eric Salzman's one-woman opera Cassandra. Opera Carolina staged the work as part of an event for National Opera Week, alongside A Hand of Bridge by Samuel Barber and The Telephone by Gian-Carlo Menotti.

Taylor and Joiner released their second film, Something Blue (L'opera del Bachelor) in December 2016. The film was an official selection of the 2017 Indianapolis International Film Festival, and was nominated for Best Score in a Short Film at the Southampton International Film Festival. Their third and final collaboration, The Bridesmaids was their first work intended directly for the stage and was premiered at the Odeon Theater in Vienna, Austria as part of the Vienna Summer Music Festival in June 2018, conducted by Kristo Kondakçi and directed by Arisa Sullivan and selections from the opera were featured at the Laurie Beechman Theatre.

Joiner wrote classical and orchestral pops arrangements for A Night of Opera and Couture at Zankel Hall, serving as music director and conductor in 2018. In October of that year the Music Committee at the National Arts Club featured Joiner, hosting an evening of his operatic works followed by a conversation with the composer. For The New York Baroque Dance Company, Joiner composed Prelude to Invention: Mode and Motion, which was premiered at the 92nd Street Y (Harkness Dance Center) with choreography by Catherine Turocy in November 2018. Joiner's first choral composition, The Golden Hour with text by K.C. Wolfe was commissioned by Eckerd College where it was premiered in 2019 by the Eckerd College Concert Choir, led by Brent Douglas.
