= Eric Salzman =

American classical composer

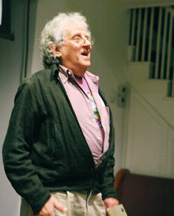
- Salzman at the Cell Theater in 2011 for the Center for Contemporary Opera atelier of his opera, Big Jim and the Small-Time Investors.
- Born: September 8, 1933; New York City, U.S.
- Died: November 12, 2017 (aged 84); New York City, U.S.
- Education: Columbia University (BA); Princeton University (MFA)
- Occupations: Composer, producer, author, music critic
- Years active: 1958–2017

Eric Salzman (September 8, 1933 – November 12, 2017) was an American composer, scholar, author, impresario, music critic, and record producer. He is best known for his contributions to 'New Music Theater,' a concept he advanced through both his compositions and writings. He established it as an independent art form, distinct from grand opera and popular musicals, both aesthetically and economically. He co-founded the American Music Theater Festival and was, at the time of his death in 2017, Composer-in-Residence at the Center for Contemporary Opera.

Salzman's one true opera, Big Jim and the Small-Time Investors (written and revised between 1985 and 2017), was developed in workshops at CCO in 2010 and 2014. It received its world-premiere production at Symphony Space in 2018, five months after his death, praised by Opera News as "truly a fine piece of post-modern creative work." Performers of his works include the New York Philharmonic, BBC Symphony Orchestra, Minnesota Orchestra, Brooklyn Philharmonic; conductors Pierre Boulez, Stanisław Skrowaczewski, Dennis Russell Davies and Lukas Foss; ensembles Western Wind and Kronos Quartet; soloists Philip Langridge, Mary Thomas, Elise Ross, Stanley Silverman, Alan Titus, Rinde Eckert, Igor Kipnis, Paul Zukofsky, Theo Bleckmann, Thomas Young; actors Stacy Keach, John O'Hurley and Paul Hecht.

== Early life ==
Salzman was born September 8, 1933, in New York City and attended Forest Hills High School (1946–1950).

After studying composition privately (1949–51) with Morris Lawner, who taught at the New York High School of Music and Art, he continued his studies at Columbia University (1954 Bachelor of Arts), majoring in music and minoring in literature. At Columbia, his teachers included Jack Beeson, Lionel Trilling, Otto Luening, and Vladimir Ussachevsky.

He pursued postgraduate work at Princeton University (1956 master of fine arts) with Milton Babbitt, Roger Sessions, Earl Kim, Edward T. Cone, Arthur Mendel, Oliver Strunk, and Nino Pirrotta. A Fulbright Fellowship (1956 – 58) enabled him to study at the Accademia di Santa Cecilia in Rome with Goffredo Petrassi and at the Darmstädter Ferienkurse in Darmstadt with Karlheinz Stockhausen, Bruno Maderna, and Luigi Nono.

== Music critic, producer, broadcaster ==
In 1958, he returned to the United States and began a career as a music critic, writing for The New York Times (1958–62), the New York Herald Tribune (1962–66), and Stereo Review (from 1966 until 1998 when it became Sound and Vision). While at the Herald Tribune in 1964 Salzman was awarded a Ford Foundation Fellowship to cover concerts in Europe. During the Fellowship (1964–65), Salzman was based in Paris. He won the Elsie O. and Philip D. Sang Prize for Critics of the Fine Arts in 1969, an award previously given to Harold Clurman and subsequently to Hilton Kramer. The judges were Aaron Copland, Vladimir Ussachevsky, and Stanisław Skrowaczewski, who cited his writing for Stereo Review. He also worked as contributing editor and critic for Opera News, Opera, Neue Zeitschrift der Musik, New York Magazine, and other publications in Germany, France, and England.

Salzman founded and ran The Electric Ear at the Electric Circus from 1967 until 1968. He served as music director of WBAI-FM (Pacifica Radio) from 1962 until 1964, and again from 1968 until 1972, winning a Major Armstrong Award for broadcasting. He interviewed numerous artists, including Stefan Wolpe and Edgard Varèse, and was himself interviewed by Virgil Thomson as the special guest on Thomson's radio program for WNCN-FM in 1970.

Through his work at WBAI, where he founded the Free Music Store, Salzman was approached by Joseph Papp in 1968 to create concerts for the then-vacant Martinson Hall at The Public Theater. As a result, the Free Music Store presented free concerts in Martinson Hall until Papp evicted the group in 1971. The Free Music Store provided a platform for musicians who wanted to explore new musical projects while foregoing compensation. Among many programs, the Free Music Store organized formal performances of ragtime music, presenting concerts featuring Eubie Blake and others. Salzman left the Free Music Store in 1972, though the Free Music Store continued operating in various locations under the leadership of Ira Weitzman.

From 1975 to 1990, Salzman produced and directed over two dozen recordings, mainly for Nonesuch Records, including two Grammy Award-nominated records: the Hal Prince production of Kurt Weill's The Silver Lake with the New York City Opera conducted by Julius Rudel (1980) and The Unknown Kurt Weill, featuring Teresa Stratas (1991). He produced the Nonesuch album The Tango Project (1991) and the two follow-up Tango Project albums, Two to Tango and The Palm Court. The first Tango Project album, for which Salzman and his collaborators transcribed Carlos Gardel's Por una Cabeza, won a Stereo Review Award for Record of the Year and was featured prominently in the films Scent of a Woman (1992) and True Lies (1994). The album has been credited for bringing attention to tango music both in Argentina and internationally. Salzman also produced several recordings featuring the music of Harry Partch and William Bolcom, as well as his own music.

== New Music Theater ==
According to Salzman's writing, the future of opera and musical theater lies in economically viable, small-scale theater where music is the dominant driving force. This concept is evident in Salzman's early works, such as:

- Verses and Cantos (1967)
- The Peloponnesian War, full-evening mime/dance/theater piece with dancer/choreographer Daniel Nagrin (1967 tour)
- Feedback, multimedia participatory environmental work for live performers, visuals, tape with Stan Vanderbeek (1968; 1969 Torcuato di Tella Institute with Marta Minujín; New York Public Television 1969)
- Nude Paper Sermon, for actor (played by Stacy Keach) Renaissance consort, chorus, electronics (commissioned by Nonesuch in 1969) toured widely in a theatrical version

The Nonesuch recording of Nude Paper Sermon was chosen separately by both Dennis Báthory-Kitsz and David Gunn, creators and hosts of the Kalvos & Damian New Music Bazaar, for their "Top 100" desert island recordings.

In 1967, Salzman founded the "New Image of Sound" series at Hunter College, where his theatrical composition Verses and Cantos (or Foxes and Hedgehogs) was performed for the inaugural concert conducted by Dennis Russell Davies alongside the New York premiere of Berio's Laborintus II. In 1972, Pierre Boulez conducted the piece with the BBC Symphony Orchestra.

In 1970, Salzman founded the Quog Music Theater, a mixed-media performing group, which included accordionist William Schimmel and percussionist David Van Tieghem. The ensemble performed many of Salzman's works, including Ecolog, a music theater piece for television (premiered on Channel 13), which received its live premiere at the New York Philharmonic's "Prospective Encounters" series in 1972, as conducted by Boulez. With Quog, Salzman experimented with theatrical forms and ensembles, creating an a capella radio opera and the music drama Lazarus (1973), combining contemporary and medieval elements, which appeared at La MaMa Experimental Theatre Club in 1974 before touring in Europe.

Salzman created numerous theatrical works with the musician Michael Sahl, with both artists generally serving as co-composer and co-librettist. Among their many collaborations were The Conjurer (1975) which premiered at the Public Theater under the direction of Tom O'Horgan, and Civilization and Its Discontents, a music theater comedy which premiered at the American Musical and Dramatic Academy in 1977. Civilization and Its Discontents toured Europe extensively, was recorded for National Public Radio and Nonesuch records, and won the Prix Italia and a Backstage Award. Other Sahl/Salzman collaborations were produced in partnership with the Pratt Institute, Victory Theater, WNYC, Theater for the New City, KCRW (Santa Monica), Quog Music Theater, and the American Music Theater Festival.

=== American Music Theater Festival ===
In 1984, Salzman founded the American Music Theater Festival with Marjorie Samoff and Ron Kaiserman. The festival's advisory council included Stephen Sondheim, Milton Babbitt, Philip Glass, and Leonard Bernstein. For the opening, Salzman reconstructed and adapted the 1927 antiwar satire Strike up the Band by George and Ira Gershwin. The production was directed by Frank Corsaro and conducted by Maurice Peress at the Walnut Street Theatre. Salzman was co-director of the Festival until 1993. Notable productions during his tenure include Anthony Davis' X, The Life and Times of Malcolm X; Julie Taymor, Elliot Goldenthal, and Sidney Goldfarb's The Transposed Heads; Duke Ellington's Queenie Pie; Emily Mann, Ntozake Shange, and Baikida Carroll's Betsy Brown; Bob Telson and Lee Breuer's The Gospel at Colonus; David Henry Hwang, Philip Glass, and Jerome Sirlin's 1000 Airplanes on the Roof; Robert Xavier Rodriguez' Frida, Harry Partch's Revelation in the Courthouse Park; William Bolcom's Casino Paradise; and a 1987 production of Salzman's and Sahl's 1976 work, Stauf, a music theater version of Faust directed by Rhoda Levine.

=== Center for Contemporary Opera ===
From 2000 until 2012, Salzman was Artistic Director of the Center for Contemporary Opera in New York City and served as Composer-in-Residence for the company. The Center for Contemporary Opera presented the United States premiere of Salzman's La Prière du loup (2003) and The True Last Words of Dutch Schultz (Symphony Space, 2007), and workshops of other works, including Big Jim & the Small-time Investors at The Flea Theater (2010) and the Faison Firehouse Theater (2014). Among the major works which were produced at the Center for Contemporary Opera during Salzman's tenure are Michael Dellaira and J. D. McClatchy's The Secret Agent and Daron Hagen and Paul Muldoon's Vera of Las Vegas.

=== Other projects ===
In 1997True Last Words of Dutch Schultz had its world premiere at the Internationaal Opera Centrum Nederland, starring Theo Bleckmann as Dutch Schultz. Also in 1997, the Théâtre Max Jacob in Quimper premiered Salzman's work, La Prière du loup, which had been commissioned by Un Théâtre pour la Musique and Scène National de Quimper and was directed by Michel Rostain, who wrote the libretto. They then commissioned Salzman to write another version of Gershwin's Strike Up the Band, which was performed several times in Quimper and Paris between 2000 and 2002. This led to a commission from L'Orchestre du Sciences-Po for a chamber orchestra suite based on the work.

In 1980, Salzman composed and conducted instrumental music and song for Yuri Rasovsky's Peabody Award-winning audio dramatization of Homer's Odyssey for the National Radio Theater. The Kronos Quartet's 1997 album, Early Music, featured Salzman's arrangement of John Cage's Totem Ancestor. This was part of a suite of five of Cage's pieces for prepared piano arranged by Salzman for string quartet or string orchestra, published by C.F. Peters. Salzman's more recent work includes the madrigal comedy Jukebox in the Tavern of Love, with text and stage direction by Valeria Vasilevski. The piece was commissioned by the Western Wind Vocal Ensemble and performed at the Flea Theater in 2008, then Brooklyn's Bargemusic in 2009.

== Publications, teaching, musicology ==
Salzman was editor of The Musical Quarterly from 1984 to 1991. His teaching appointments have included positions at Queens College, City University of New York (1966–68), the Institute for Studies in American Music, and guest faculty/lecturer at Tisch School of the Arts, the Music Theater Program at the Banff Centre for the Arts, Yale University School of Music, the Conservatoire Nationale de Lyon, and other institutions. In 1966, he was invited by Friedelind Wagner to present several lectures at the Bayreuth Festival as part of the Master Classes on contemporary music in the theater

He wrote The New Music Theater: Seeing the Voice, Hearing the Body with Thomas Desi (Oxford University Press, 2008) and Twentieth Century Music: An Introduction (Prentice Hall, 1967; 4th edition, 2001), which has become a widely used textbook in university courses on modern music. He also wrote Making Changes: A Practical Guide to Vernacular Harmony with Michael Sahl (G. Schirmer Inc., 1986), in addition to articles in various publications. He published an essay on the new music theater movement, "Music-Theater Defined: It's ... Well... Um..."

== Eric Salzman Award for New Music Theater ==
The Eric Salzman Award for New Music Theater was established in 2018 by the Quog Music Theater and the Estate of Eric Salzman. The inaugural award was adjudicated by Marcus Paus, Victoria Bond and Scott Joiner, and was given to Marisa Michelson and Anna K. Jacobs.

== Personal life ==
Salzman was married to environmental activist, writer, and Green Party founding member Lorna Salzman (née Jackson) from 1955 until his death. They had two daughters, the poet Eva Salzman and composer/songwriter Stephanie Salzman.

Salzman was an avid birdwatcher and an expert in bird calls of Eastern Long Island.

He died on November 12, 2017, from a heart attack, aged 84.

== Recordings ==
- Civilization & Its Discontents (reissued January 2012; Labor Records LAB 7089)
- The Nude Paper Sermon/Wiretap (reissued October 2012; Labor Records LAB 7092) (The Nude Paper Sermon originally issued on Nonesuch, Wiretap originally issued on Finnadar)
- Jukebox in the Tavern of Love (released May 2014 – Labor Records LAB 7094) * This recording by the Western Wind Vocal Ensemble also features Meredith Monk's Basket Rondo; was a WQXR Q2 Album of the Week in May 2014; was chosen by Gramophone Magazine for inclusion in their 2014 Recordings of the Year.
