= Gumplowicz =

Gumplowicz is a surname. Notable people with the surname include:

- Ludwig Gumplowicz (1838–1909), Polish sociologist, jurist, historian, and political scientist
- Philippe Gumplowicz (born 1950), French musicologist and music historian
