= Charlie Justice (halfback) =

American football player (1924–2003)

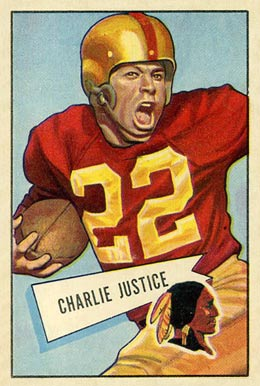
- Justice on 1952 Bowman football card

No. 22
- Position: Halfback

Personal information
- Born: May 18, 1924; Asheville, North Carolina, U.S.
- Died: October 17, 2003 (aged 79); Cherryville, North Carolina, U.S.
- Listed height: 5 ft 10 in (1.78 m)
- Listed weight: 176 lb (80 kg)

Career information
- High school: Lee H. Edwards (Asheville)
- College: North Carolina (1946–1949)
- NFL draft: 1950: 16th round, 201st overall pick

Career history
- Washington Redskins (1950; 1952–1954)

Awards and highlights
- 80 Greatest Redskins; Washington Commanders Ring of Fame; Consensus All-American (1948); First-team All-American (1949); 2× Second-team All-American (1946, 1947); 4× First-team All-SoCon (1946–1949); North Carolina Tar Heels No. 22 retired

Career NFL statistics
- Rushing yards: 1,284
- Rushing average: 4.8
- Rushing touchdowns: 3
- Receptions: 63
- Receiving yards: 962
- Receiving touchdowns: 7
- Stats at Pro Football Reference
- College Football Hall of Fame

Charles Ronald "Choo Choo" Justice (May 18, 1924 – October 17, 2003) was an American professional football player who was a halfback for the Washington Redskins of the National Football League (NFL). He played college football for the North Carolina Tar Heels and was inducted into the College Football Hall of Fame in 1961.

== Early life ==
Born in Asheville, North Carolina, Justice attended and played high school football at Lee H. Edwards High School (now Asheville High School), where he was a part of two undefeated seasons. He averaged 25 yards per rush his last year in high school. His senior year, his team outscored the opposition 400–6.

== World War II ==
After high school, Justice spent four years in the Navy in World War II. During that time, he played on the football team at United States Naval Training Center Bainbridge. His nickname Charlie "Choo Choo" was given to him because of the way he dodged tackles. One of the officers remarked, "He looks like a runaway train, we ought to call him Choo Choo."

== College career ==
After the war, Justice was heavily recruited by Duke, North Carolina, and South Carolina. He was quoted as saying that he believed that an athlete should play in the state that he is going to make his career in, so he chose the University of North Carolina. Being a war veteran, he knew he had no need of an athletic scholarship. Justice sent a proposal to both universities asking each to allow him to attend on his G.I. tuition money and give the scholarship to his wife. Only North Carolina accepted this. Thus Justice attended and played college football at the University of North Carolina under Carl Snavely, where he played tailback for four years. Justice was also an active member of the Beta Theta Pi fraternity in his years at UNC. While there, he was named an All-American in 1948 and 1949, and finished second in the Heisman Trophy voting both years. While at North Carolina, Justice ran or threw for 64 touchdowns and set a team total-offense record of 4,883 yards, which stood until 1994.

He was named the Most Valuable Player in the 1950 College All-Star Game, when he led the college team to a 17–7 win over the Philadelphia Eagles. He ran for 133 yards which was 48 yards more than the entire Eagles Team. He had runs of 33 and 45 yards and caught a pass for 40 yards.

During college, Johnny Long and his Orchestra recorded the song "All the Way, Choo Choo."

== Professional career ==
Justice was drafted in the 16th round of the 1950 NFL draft by the Washington Redskins. His professional career was hampered and ultimately cut short by injuries.

In an exhibition game in 1952 in the Los Angeles Memorial Coliseum Justice rushed 11 times for 199 yards (18.1 average), with runs of 46, 65 and 54 yards. He sustained a broken arm in the third quarter.

== NFL career statistics ==
Legend
**Bold**	Career high

Year	Team	Games		Rushing					Receiving				
Year	Team	GP	GS	Att	Yds	Avg	Lng	TD	Rec	Yds	Avg	Lng	TD
1950	WAS	8	7	59	285	4.8	**71**	0	19	180	9.5	37	**2**
1952	WAS	11	3	36	129	3.6	26	0	11	106	9.6	15	1
1953	WAS	12	12	**115**	**616**	**5.4**	43	**2**	**22**	**434**	19.7	54	**2**
1954	WAS	12	8	56	254	4.5	50	1	11	242	**22.0**	**80**	**2**
		43	30	266	1,284	4.8	71	3	63	962	15.3	80	7

== After football ==
After football, Justice owned an insurance firm. He and his wife, Sarah, had a son, Ronnie, and a daughter, Barbara. He died in 2003. In 1970, the University of North Carolina dedicated a section of its athletic center in his name, calling it the Charlie Justice Hall of Honor. Justice Street in Chapel Hill, NC is named after him, as is the Justice Center on the campus of the University of North Carolina at Asheville in his hometown. He was also named one of the all time 70 Greatest Redskins. In 1999, Sports Illustrated named Justice the 14th Greatest North Carolina Sports Figure. The 22 (his jersey number at UNC) yard line hashmarks at Kenan Memorial Stadium are colored blue in his honor.

The novel Everybody's All-American by Frank Deford had as its protagonist Gavin "The Ghost" Grey, a star running back at UNC who was drafted by the Redskins but saw his pro career dashed by injuries, and thought to be inspired by Justice. Deford has denied that Grey was based on any particular college football player (specifically ruling out both Justice and Billy Cannon, another contemporary star halfback, as the film version of the novel shifted the setting to Cannon's alma mater of Louisiana State University) and instead was derived from a composite of former athletes he had met during his career as a journalist.
