= Ao Li =

Chinese opera performer

- 李鳌
- Born: 8 February 1988 (age 38); Dezhou, China
- Occupations: Classical bass-baritone; Academic teacher
- Organizations: San Francisco Opera; Shandong Normal University
- Awards: Operalia, The World Opera Competition; Metropolitan Opera National Council Auditions

Ao Li (Chinese: 李鳌; pinyin: Lǐ Áo; born 8 February 1988) is a Chinese operatic bass-baritone and voice teacher who is particularly known for his performances at the San Francisco Opera. In 2013 he won first prize in the Operalia, The World Opera Competition and in 2014 he won the Metropolitan Opera National Council Auditions.

== Life and career ==
Born in Dezhou, Shandong, Li earned a bachelor's degree in vocal performance from Shandong Normal University before pursuing graduate studies in the United States at the University of Cincinnati – College-Conservatory of Music. After completing his master's degree, he attended the Canada Vocal Arts Institute and joined the Merola Opera Program at the San Francisco Opera (SFO) where he was coached by César Ulloa. He spent three years working with the SFO as an Adler Fellow. He is currently a member of the Washington National Opera's Domingo-Cafritz Young Artist Program. He drew international attention in 2013 when he won the Operalia, The World Opera Competition, and again in 2014 when he won the Metropolitan Opera National Council Auditions.

Li made his professional opera debut in 2011 with the SFO as Le Dancaïre in Georges Bizet's Carmen. His subsequent appearances with the SFO include Ascanio Petrucci in Lucrezia Borgia (2011), Lorenzo in I Capuleti e i Montecchi (2012), Sciarrone in Tosca (2012), The Indian Gardener / Ben Weatherstaff in the world premiere of Nolan Gasser's The Secret Garden (2013), and both Fiorello and Don Basilio in The Barber of Seville (2013). He was also a featured soloist in a 2013 concert honoring mezzo-soprano Zheng Cao at the San Francisco War Memorial and Performing Arts Center. He has also appeared at the Seoul Arts Centre in Korea as Gremin in Eugene Onegin, and appeared in that same opera as the Captain of the Guards at the National Centre for the Performing Arts in Beijing in 2014. In 2015 he created the role of Male Soloist No. 4 in the world premiere of Huang Ruo's Paradise Interrupted at the Spoleto Festival USA.

Li currently teaches on the voice faculty of Shandong Normal University.
