= Le Fils =

Le Fils may refer to:

- The Son (2002 film), 2002 Belgian-French mystery film directed by Jean-Pierre and Luc Dardenne.
- The Son (Zeller play), 2018 play by Florian Zeller
- Le Fils, 1973 French film directed by Pierre Granier-Deferre
- Le Fils, 1957 novel by Georges Simenon
- Le Fils, 2011 novel by Michel Rostain
