= Mark Withers (actor) =

American actor (1947–2024)

- Born: June 25, 1947; Binghamton, New York, U.S.
- Died: November 22, 2024 (aged 77); Glendora, California. U.S.
- Education: California State University, Los Angeles (BA); Minnesota State University, Mankato (MFA)
- Occupation: Actor

Mark Fred Withers (June 25, 1947 – November 22, 2024) was an American actor, best known for his roles on television.

== Early life and education ==
Withers was born in Binghamton, New York on June 25, 1947. He earned a Bachelor of Arts degree in acting and directing from California State University, Los Angeles and a Master of Fine Arts from Minnesota State University, Mankato.

== Career ==
Withers portrayed Ted Dinard, the ill-fated gay lover of Steven Carrington (played by Al Corley) during the 1981 first season of the prime time soap opera Dynasty. Other television credits include Wonder Woman; The Greatest American Hero; Magnum, P.I.; The Dukes of Hazzard; Hart to Hart; Remington Steele; Hotel; Dallas; L.A. Law; Matlock; The King of Queens and Frasier.

== Death ==
Withers died of pancreatic cancer on November 22, 2024, in Glendora, California, at the age of 77.

== Filmography ==
=== Film ===
Year	Title	Role	Notes
1985	Basic Training	Captain Drysdale	
1998	Southern Man	L.J.	
2013	The Ultimate Life	Strang	
2014	Turn Around Jake	Leo Zaker	
2015	The Phoenix Incident	Bill Lauder	
2019	Bolden	Joe Segretto	
2019	The Creatress	Mr. Bellow	Uncredited

=== Television ===
Year	Title	Role	Notes
1978	How the West Was Won	Tobe Harker	2 episodes
1978	Wild and Wooly	Will	Television film
1978	Wonder Woman	Luther	Episode: "The Murderous Missile"
1978–1979	Kaz	Peter Colcourt	23 episodes
1979	California Fever	Sibley	Episode: "The Good Life"
1979, 1981	Trapper John, M.D.	Various roles	2 episodes
1981	Dynasty	Ted Dinard	6 episodes
1981	The Greatest American Hero	Shaeffer	Episode: "Fire Man"
1981	Best of the West	Nat Lindsay	Episode: "The New Marshal"
1981	Death of a Centerfold	Billy Compton	Television film
1982	Magnum, P.I.	Dave Gilbert	Episode: "Try to Remember"
1982	The Dukes of Hazzard	Dennis	Episode: "Bad Day in Hazzard"
1982	Hart to Hart	Paul Waterman	Episode: "Harts and Fraud"
1984	Something About Amelia	Jensen	Television film
1984	Her Life as a Man	Tom	Television film
1985	It's Your Move	Mr. Rosenberg	Episode: "The Dregs of Humanity: Part 2"
1985	Santa Barbara	Doctor	Episode #1.206
1985	The Hugga Bunch	Parker Severson	Television film
1985	Remington Steele	Norman Maxwell	Episode: "Premium Steele"
1986	Hotel	Dennis Preston	Episode: "Child's Play"
1986	Hill Street Blues	Roger	Episode: "I Want My Hill Street Blues"
1986	Alex: The Life of a Child	Mac Deford	Television film
1986	Divorce Court	Dr. Ed Wells	Episode dated 14 July 1986
1986	Hunter	David Hendricks	Episode: "From San Francisco with Love"
1986–1987	Days of Our Lives	Coach Locke	8 episodes
1987	Dallas	Private Investigator	Episode: "Night Visitor"
1987	L.A. Law	Dr. Glasband	Episode: "Beef Jerky"
1987	The Wizard	Copeland	Episode: "H.E.N.R.I. VIII"
1987	The New Gidget	Coach Hardesty	Episode: "Calendar Boys"
1989	Matlock	Judge	Episode: "The Black Widow"
2001	Frasier	Board Member	Episode: "A Day in May"
2002	The King of Queens	IPS Driver	Episode: "Hero Worship"
2003	She Spies	Security Guard	Episode: "Message from Kassar"
2006	Dynasty Reunion: Catfights & Caviar	Ted Dinard	Television film
2011	Criminal Minds	Lou Manzoni	Episode: "The Bittersweet Science"
2012	Ruby & Martin	Shannon's Dad	2 episodes
2013	Drop Dead Diva	Attorney General	Episode: "The Real Jane"
2013	In Development	Mitch Kramer	Episode: "Where's Mike?"
2013	True Blood	Morris	3 episodes
2013	Castle	Alan Lane	Episode: "Like Father, Like Daughter"
2014	Reckless	Chief Victor Ellsworth	3 episodes
2014	Work from Home	Frank	Episode: "Family Dinner"
2016	Stranger Things	Gary	Episode: "Chapter Four: The Body"
2017, 2018	Sense8	Lawrence	2 episodes
