= The Secret Garden (opera) =

The Secret Garden is an opera by Nolan Gasser with a libretto (based on the 1911 novel by Frances Hodgson Burnett) written by Carey Harrison. Commissioned by the San Francisco Opera and presented in partnership with Cal Performances, it premiered on March 1, 2013, at Zellerbach Hall at the University of California, Berkeley.

== Roles ==
Role	Voice type	Premiere cast, 1 March 2013 Conductor: Sara Jobin
Mary Lennox	soprano	Sarah Shafer
Colin Craven	a boy tenor	Michael Kepler Meo
Archibald Craven	baritone	Philippe Sly
Dickon Sowerby	tenor	Scott Joiner
Martha Sowerby	mezzo-soprano	Laura Krumm
Mrs. Medlock	soprano	Erin Johnson
Ben Weatherstaff	baritone	Ao Li
Susan Sowerby	soprano	Marina Harris
Orchestra		San Francisco Opera Orchestra
Direction		Jose Maria Condemi
Visual design		Naomie Kremer
Costume design		Kristi Johnson
Lighting design		Christopher Maravich
Musical preparation		Robert Mollicone, Sun Ha Yoon, John Churchwell, Sara Jobin

== Critical reception ==
The opera received positive reviews from Joshua Kosman in the San Francisco Chronicle, Janos Gereben in The San Francisco Examiner and San Francisco Classical Voice, Stacy Trevenon at StageandCinema.com and others, with mixed reviews from the San Jose Mercury News and elsewhere.
