= Frank Deford =

American sportswriter (1938–2017)

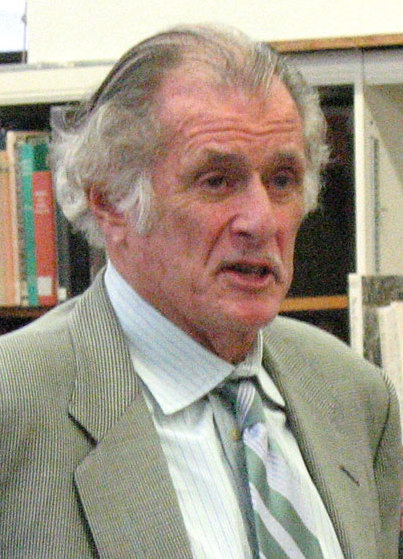
- Frank Deford speaking at the Bridgeport Public Library in Bridgeport, Connecticut, September 21, 2007
- Born: Benjamin Franklin Deford III; December 16, 1938; Baltimore, Maryland, U.S.
- Died: May 28, 2017 (aged 78); Key West, Florida, U.S.
- Education: Princeton University
- Occupations: Sports journalist, novelist
- Spouse: Carol Penner Deford
- Children: 3

Signature
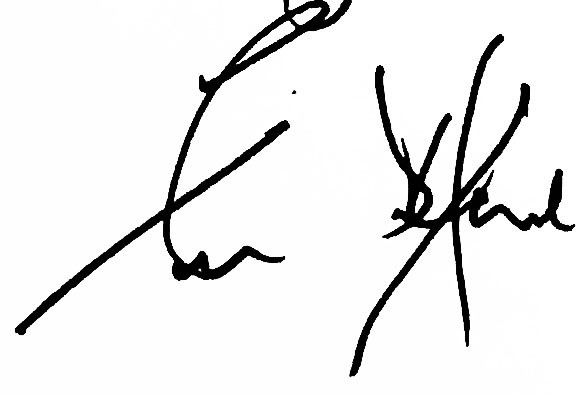

Benjamin Franklin Deford III (December 16, 1938 – May 28, 2017) was an American sportswriter and novelist. From 1980 until his death in 2017, he was a regular sports commentator on NPR's Morning Edition radio program.

Deford wrote for Sports Illustrated magazine from 1962 until his death in 2017, and was a correspondent for the Real Sports with Bryant Gumbel television program on HBO. He wrote 18 books, nine of them novels. A member of the National Sportscasters and Sportswriters Association Hall of Fame, Deford was six times voted National Sportswriter of the Year by the members of that organization, and was twice voted Magazine Writer of the Year by the Washington Journalism Review.

In 2012, Deford became the first magazine recipient of the Red Smith Award. In 2013, he was awarded the National Humanities Medal, was presented with the William Allen White Citation for "excellence in journalism" by the University of Kansas, and became the first sports journalist ever to receive the National Press Foundation's highest honor, the W.M. Kiplinger Award for Distinguished Contributions to Journalism.

Deford's archives are held by the University of Texas at Austin, where an annual lecture is presented in his name. He was a long-time advocate for research and treatment of cystic fibrosis.

== Life and career ==
=== Early life ===
Deford grew up in Baltimore, Maryland, the oldest of three sons, and attended the Calvert School and Gilman School in Baltimore. He is a graduate of Princeton University and resided in Key West, Florida, with his wife, the former Carol Penner, who had been a fashion model. They have two surviving children: Christian (b. 1969) and Scarlet (b. 1980). Scarlet was adopted as an infant from the Philippines a few months after his daughter Alexandra's death from cystic fibrosis at age 8 on January 19, 1980. Deford has two grandchildren; Annabel (b. 2010) and Hunter (b. 2012). Deford met his wife in Delaware and they were married in Newport, Rhode Island in 1965.

=== Career ===
After graduation from Princeton in 1962, Deford began his career as a researcher at Sports Illustrated. In addition to his writing at Sports Illustrated, he was a commentator on CNN and worked as a correspondent for HBO's Real Sports with Bryant Gumbel since 1995. He was a regular Wednesday commentator for NPR's Morning Edition from 1980 to 2016, when his essays became monthly until he retired in May 2017. Among Deford's most frequent topics was his disdain for soccer. His 1981 novel Everybody's All-American was named one of Sports Illustrated's Top 25 Sports Books of All Time and was later made into a film of the same title.

Much of the fiction he wrote is set outside of the sports realm. His last novel was the acclaimed Bliss, Remembered, a 1930s romance between a pretty young American and the son of a German diplomat; the story is written from the point of view of the woman. He was also the screenwriter on the films Trading Hearts (1988) and Four Minutes (2005).

In 1989, Deford became editor-in-chief of The National, the first daily U.S. sports newspaper. It ceased publication after only 18 months. After writing for Newsweek and Vanity Fair, Deford became a senior contributing writer at Sports Illustrated.

=== Advocacy ===
Deford served as chairman of the Cystic Fibrosis Foundation from 1982 until 1999 and was chairman emeritus after that. He became a cystic-fibrosis advocate after his daughter Alexandra was diagnosed with the illness in 1972. After she died at age 8 on January 19, 1980, he chronicled her life in the memoir Alex: The Life of a Child. The book was made into a movie starring Craig T. Nelson as Deford, Bonnie Bedelia as his wife Carol, and Gennie James as Alex.

=== Death ===
Deford died on May 28, 2017, at the age of 78, at his home in Key West, Florida.

== Awards and accomplishments ==
- Member of the National Sportscasters and Sportswriters Association Hall of Fame
- Six-time U.S. Sportswriter of the Year winner
- Twice voted Magazine Writer of the Year by the Washington Journalism Review
- National Magazine Award recipient for 1999 Sports Illustrated article on Bill Russell
- Peabody Award recipient for writer on 1999 HBO documentary "Dare to Compete"
- Christopher Award winner
- University of Missouri Honor Award for Distinguished Service to Journalism
- Winner of a 1988 Emmy Award for his work as a writer during the Seoul Olympics
- Winner of a CableACE Award in 1994 for writing the HBO Sports documentary Arthur Ashe: Citizen of the World
- Dick Schaap Award for Outstanding Journalism recipient in 2003
- Received ten honorary degrees, most recently in 2011 from Washington College, Chestertown, Maryland.
- 2012 Inducted into the Roller Derby Hall of Fame.
- 2012 Denver Press Club, Damon Runyon Award Recipient
- 2013 William Allen White Foundation National Citation at the University of Kansas
- 2013 Awarded a National Humanities Medal for "transforming how we think about sports."
- 2013 PEN/ESPN Lifetime Achievement Award for Literary Sports Writing

== Published books ==
- Five Strides on the Banked Track: The Life and Times of the Roller Derby, Little Brown & Company (1971), ISBN 978-0-316-17920-1
- Cut 'n' Run, Viking Press (1973)
- There She Is: The Life and Times of Miss America, Viking Press (1975) ISBN 0-670-69858-X
- Big Bill Tilden: The Triumphs and The Tragedy, Simon & Schuster (1976)
- The Owner, Viking Press (1978)
- Everybody's All-American, Viking Press (1981)
- Alex: The Life of a Child, Viking Press (1983) ISBN 0-670-11195-3
- The Spy in the Deuce Court, Putnam (1986) ISBN 0-399-13134-5
- The World's Tallest Midget: The Best of Frank Deford, Little Brown (1987) ISBN 0-316-17946-9
- Casey On The Loose, Viking Press (1988)
- Love and Infamy, Viking Press (1993)
- The Best Of Frank Deford, Triumph Books (2000) ISBN 1-57243-360-4
- The Other Adonis: A Novel, Sourcebooks Landmark (2001) ISBN 1-4022-0011-0
- An American Summer: A Novel, Sourcebooks Landmark (2002) ISBN 1-4022-0059-5
- The Old Ball Game, Atlantic Monthly Press (2005) ISBN 0-87113-885-9
- The Entitled, Sourcebooks Landmark (2007) ISBN 1-4022-0896-0
- Bliss, Remembered, The Overlook Press (2010)
- Over Time: My Life as a Sportswriter, Atlantic Monthly Press (2012) ISBN 0802120156

== See also ==
- WSHU
