= Richard Joiner =

- Born: March 17, 1918; Wichita, Kansas
- Died: January 6, 1999 (aged 80)
- Instrument: Clarinet

Richard Joiner (March 17, 1918 – January 6, 1999) was an American clarinetist and teacher of clarinet.

== Life and career ==
Born in Wichita, Kansas, he attended the National Music Camp in 1936 and the Eastman School of Music from 1936 until 1940 where he studied with Rufus Arey as the winner of the Rochester Prize Scholarship. He became principal clarinetist of the National Symphony Orchestra in 1940. When he was drafted in 1941, he joined the United States Marine Band, the "Presidents Own," as principle clarinetist and held the position until 1946, playing for Franklin D. Roosevelt's fourth inauguration on January 20, 1945, as well as his funeral at Arlington National Cemetery on April 15 of that year.

He played the premiere of Darius Milhaud's Concerto for Clarinet on January 30, 1946, with the US Marine Chamber Orchestra under the baton of Captain William F. Santelmann. The piece was originally written for Benny Goodman, although it was never performed by Goodman. At this time, in addition to touring, the band played weekly concerts on the steps of the U.S. Capitol and weekly NBC radio broadcasts, while the small chamber orchestra frequently performed for state luncheons and dinners at the White House. In 1946, after honorable discharge, he enrolled at Columbia University, undertaking clarinet studies with Daniel Bonade. A few weeks into the semester, he received a principle contract offer from the Baltimore Symphony (which included the offer for a teaching position at Peabody Conservatory), followed by a principle contract offer from the Denver Symphony Orchestra which he accepted at the advice of Bonade. In 1947 he married Kathleen Joy, DSO pianist and former protégée of Antonia Brico.

As principal clarinetist of the Denver Symphony (predecessor of the Colorado Symphony) from 1946 until 1982, he played under Saul Caston, Vladimir Golschmann, Brian Priestman and Sixten Ehrling. His playing can be heard on the DSO recording of Henry Brant's Trinity of Spheres (1979), which was re-released by Innova Records in 2006, and the orchestra's Grammy-nominated world-premiere recording of Alberto Ginastera's Milena (1973) featuring soprano Phyllis Curtin, conducted by Priestman (Desto, re-released by Phoenix USA). Other performances included numerous conferences of the International Clarinet Association, and chamber music performances with the Juilliard String Quartet, the Hungarian Quartet and the Paganini Quartet. In addition to the DSO, Joiner played principal clarinet for the Central City Opera for many seasons.

Among numerous pieces written for Joiner are the Dialogue for Clarinet and Piano, op. 60, no. 2, (1957) by Cecil Effinger (dedicated to Richard and Kathleen Joiner), and several pieces by George Lynn, including the Concert Piece for Clarinet and String Orchestra, the Cantilena for Clarinet and Piano, and Reminiscences with Folk Tunes (for Richard and Kathleen Joiner).

He taught clarinet at the University of Denver, University of Colorado at Boulder and the Rocky Ridge Music Center in Estes Park, CO. His clarinet students have performed with many distinguished ensembles, including the Eastman Wind Ensemble, Philadelphia Orchestra, Chicago Symphony Orchestra, Pittsburgh Symphony, Colorado Symphony, Rochester Philharmonic and many others. They include clarinetists Eric Mandat, Andrew Stevens and Alice Meyer. In addition, he taught clarinet lessons to jazz guitarist and composer Bill Frisell. He contributed record reviews to The Clarinet, the official publication of the ICA. He is the father of American violinist Lee Joiner and the grandfather of operatic tenor Scott Joiner.
