= Everybody's All-American =

Book by Frank Deford

- Author: Frank Deford
- Genre: Sports fiction
- Publisher: Viking Press
- Pages: 314 pp.
- ISBN: 978-0-670-30035-8
- OCLC: 7273853

Everybody's All-American is a novel by longtime Sports Illustrated contributor Frank Deford, published in 1981. It was made into a motion picture, directed by Taylor Hackford.

== Plot summary ==
The novel tells the story of a fictional famous college football player at the University of North Carolina at Chapel Hill during the early 1950s. The setting of the novel was changed to Louisiana State University for the movie adaptation. The main character, Gavin Grey, wins the Heisman Trophy and then goes on to a professional career, but is sidetracked by alcoholism, failed business ventures, and marital difficulties among other misjudgments.

The novel is narrated by Grey's nephew, Donnie McClure, a historian who has written a biography of Confederate war hero J.E.B. Stuart. During his college career, Grey is frequently compared to Stuart, both celebrated as iconic figures in their respective eras.

Several key scenes in the novel take place away from the football field. At a fraternity party, a carelessly placed cigarette ignites the dress of a young woman, who staggers back in fear and nearly starts a much larger fire by lighting a set of drapes. Despite a strong fear of fire, Grey saves the woman by leaping forward and dousing the flames. A few weeks later, Grey, McClure, and a UNC teammate, Lawrence, venture into a black neighborhood where Grey meets Narvel Blue, another one-time football star whose greatness was never realized because of bad grades, segregation, and bad luck. Blue and Grey compare attributes but decide that a foot-race must be held to determine which is the faster runner. Despite falling behind initially, Grey eventually overcomes Blue by a shade at the end of the race.

After a serious knee injury cuts short his professional career, he is miserable in retirement and returns to accept a lesser role with the Baltimore Colts. However, his season, and ultimately his football career, end after a knee injury in his third game. Grey is left calling every team in the NFL, begging for one more chance.

Grey struggles to adapt to life after football, increasingly alienating those around him. His nephew Donnie becomes a historian and biographer, his wife Babs builds an independent career, and Narvel Blue becomes a restaurateur. Grey's inability to move beyond his athletic identity is the central theme of the novel's conclusion.

== Speculation on sources ==
Some have said that the main character in the novel is based on Charlie "Choo-Choo" Justice, a real-life North Carolina football star. After the film's release, because it had been relocated to Louisiana, there were rumors that Deford had based Gavin Grey on LSU's All-American running back, Billy Cannon. Deford has denied that the character of Gavin Grey was based on any real person, but was, in fact, a composite of many college stars he had known in several sports, rather than any single individual.

== Critical reception ==
Kirkus Reviews wrote that "the pathos of the ex-sports star who lives in the past has by now become a book/movie cliche; and Sports Illustrated editor Deford (The Owner) ends up by tossing in just about every ironic, tear-jerking gimmick that goes with the territory."
