= The Hugga Bunch =

1980s toy line and corresponding film

- Type: Action figures
- Company: Kenner Products
- Country: United States
- Availability: 1985–

The Hugga Bunch is a 1980s toyline from Kenner, Parker Brothers and Hallmark Cards. Starting in early 1985, the companies manufactured the Hugga Bunch dolls, each of which held a smaller doll called a "huglet" in their arms. During that year, the line generated over US$40 million in sales.

The title characters in the franchise lived in a place called "Huggaland".

== Film ==
The Hugga Bunch
- Written by: David Swift
- Directed by: Gus Jekel
- Country of origin: United States
- Original language: English

Production
- Budget: US$1.4 million

Original release
- Release: 1985

The toys inspired The Hugga Bunch, a 1985 television film produced by Filmfair Communications.

Written by David Swift and directed by Gus Jekel, it earned a Primetime Emmy Award for Outstanding Visual Effects. Produced for US$1.4 million, it was the most expensive TV special ever produced at the time. Along with a making-of special, it was released on VHS, LaserDisc and Beta by Vestron Video's Children's Video Library. To date, it has not been released on DVD and/or Blu-ray.

=== Plot ===
In the film, a girl travels through her mirror into HuggaLand to find a way to keep her grandmother—the only one who knows how to hug—young.

=== Cast ===
- Gennie James - Bridget Severson
- Natalie Masters - Grams Severson
- Terry Castillo - Huggins
- Tony Urbano - Hugsy
- Aarika Wells - Queen Admira
- Carl Steven - Andrew Severson
- Susan Mullen - Janet Severson
- Mark Withers - Parker Severson
- Kelly Britt - Aunt Ruth
- Richard Haydn - Bookworm (voice)

== A Day Full of Hugs ==
In 1985, Parker Brothers released an album. Singers included Jonathan Edwards, Bradley Kane, Russell Horton, Michael Mark, Jessica Craven, Merle Miller, Terry Teszor, John Henry Kurtz, Steve and Tom Chapin.

Song	Songwriters
Everybody Needs A Friend	Tom and Steve Chapin
All Kinds of Hugs	Tom Chapin, John Forster and Steve Chapin
Smiling Again	John Forster
The Choose-Up Song	John Forster, Steve and Tom Chapin
Through the Mirror	Steve Chapin, Tom Chapin and John Forster
March to the Bookworm's House	Tom and Steve Chapin
The Bookworm's Book	Steve Chapin, Tom Chapin and John Forster
The Hug-A-Lug Song	Johnny Talon and Don Specht
Shrugs Are Like the Measles	Tom Chapin, John Forster and Steve Chapin
Love to Share	John Forster
