= The Secret Garden (1987 film) =

1987 television film by Alan Grint

- Genre: Family; Drama
- Based on: The Secret Garden by Frances Hodgson Burnett
- Directed by: Alan Grint
- Starring: Gennie James; Barret Oliver; Jadrien Steele; Michael Hordern; Billie Whitelaw; Derek Jacobi
- Music by: John Cameron
- Country of origin: United States
- Original language: English

Production
- Executive producer: Norman Rosemont
- Producer: Steve Lanning
- Production locations: Highclere Castle, Highclere, Hampshire, England
- Cinematography: Robert Paynter
- Editor: Keith Palmer
- Running time: 100 minutes
- Production companies: Rosemont Productions Limited; Hallmark Hall of Fame; Viacom Productions

Original release
- Network: CBS
- Release: November 30, 1987

The Secret Garden is the 1987 Hallmark Hall of Fame made-for-television film adaptation loosely based on Frances Hodgson Burnett's 1911 novel The Secret Garden, aired on CBS November 30, 1987 and produced by Rosemont Productions Limited. The film stars Gennie James, Barret Oliver, Jadrien Steele, Billie Whitelaw, Michael Hordern, and Sir Derek Jacobi. It won a Primetime Emmy Award in 1988 for Outstanding Children's Program.

== Plot ==
The story is told as a flashback of the twenty-year-old Mary Lennox (Irina Brook) returning to Misselthwaite Manor after World War I, during which she worked as a nurse in a hospital. She looks for the key to the secret garden, but does not find it, so she sits down and remembers her troubled, lonely girlhood a decade ago.

The main story begins in colonial India with the young, neglected, and selfish Mary Lennox (Gennie James) waking in the night to find her servants not answering and her parents having a late dinner party. The dinner guests discuss a cholera epidemic that is infesting the region, but Mary's vain shallow mother cares only about attending another party. Only moments later, Colonel Harry Lennox collapses. The following morning, Mary wakes to find her neglectful parents dying and all their servants either dead or fled. She is discovered by English officers and is soon sent to live with a school friend of her late father's named Mr. Archibald Craven (Derek Jacobi), even though the two of them have met twice.

Mary is sent to Misselthwaite Manor, an isolated home on the moors of Yorkshire. She is shocked and disappointed when the servants do not defer to her as they did in India. While adjusting to life in England, Mary meets the maid Martha Sowerby (Cassie Stuart) who tells her the story of a secret walled garden that was locked up, with the key thrown away, after the late Mrs. Lilias Craven died there. Mary distracts herself from her loneliness and boredom by searching for the door to this garden. Eventually, she finds both door and key, only to learn that the garden has fallen to ruin. With the help of Martha's brother Dickon (Barret Oliver), Mary works to revive the garden.

Meanwhile, inside Misselthwaite Manor, Mary frequently wakes in the night to the ghostly sounds of sobbing. The servants insist that the sound is the wind, but one night Mary goes exploring and discovers Mr. Craven's bed-bound son Colin (Jadrien Steele), who weeps incessantly because he is convinced he is going to die. Everyone in the house hates him and hopes he will finally die because of his bad temper. The two gradually become friends as Mary tells him about his late mother's garden and how she and Dickon have been restoring it. At last Colin is curious enough that he demands to see this garden.

With Dickon's help, Mary takes Colin in his wheelchair to visit the garden in secret. Soon Colin declares that the garden must be magic, which inspires him to take his first steps unassisted. The house gardener Ben Weatherstaff (Michael Hordern), who has been spying on the children, witnesses this and is amazed. Ben offers to help revive the garden as well, and Colin tries to learn to stand and walk by himself.

Far away in London, Mr. Craven receives a letter from Dickon's mother Susan insisting he return to Misselthwaite Manor at once. Mr Craven arrives to discover the secret garden in full bloom, with the children gathered there. Colin rises and walks to his father for the first time, announcing that he is well now and will live forever and ever.

When the adult Mary finishes reminiscing, Ben Weatherstaff greets her and gives her the key to the secret garden. They discuss what happened to Dickon, who died in the war at the Forest of Argonne. Then the adult Colin (Colin Firth) enters the garden, having been wounded and released from the hospital. He says he has asked Mary to marry him before, but she never answered. She says she has been waiting for him to ask her in their garden. Colin proposes again, and Mary accepts.

== Cast ==
- Gennie James as Mary Lennox
  - Irina Brook as Adult Mary Lennox
- Barret Oliver as Dickon Sowerby
- Jadrien Steele as Colin Craven
  - Colin Firth as Adult Colin Craven
- Billie Whitelaw as Mrs. Medlock
- Cassie Stuart as Martha Sowerby
- Michael Hordern as Benjamin Weatherstaff
- Derek Jacobi as Archibald Craven
- Lucy Gutteridge as Mrs. Lennox
- Julian Glover as Colonel McGraw
- Margaret Whiting as Nurse Boggs
- Philip Locke as Pitcher
- David Waller as Dr. Craven
- Pat Heywood as Mrs. Sowerby
- Carmel McSharry as Mrs. Gordy
- Tony Selby as Sergeant Barney
- Alison Doody as Lilias Craven (dream; cameos)
- Edward Tudor-Pole as John the Footman
- Stephen Dillane as Captain Harry Lennox
- Dominic Hawksley as Soldier

== Production ==
=== Filming ===
Highclere Castle was used for interior and exterior settings of Misselthwaite Manor.

=== Soundtrack ===
The film uses Chopin's Nocturne no. 19 as its main theme.
