= Faison Firehouse Theater =

Theater in Harlem, New York City

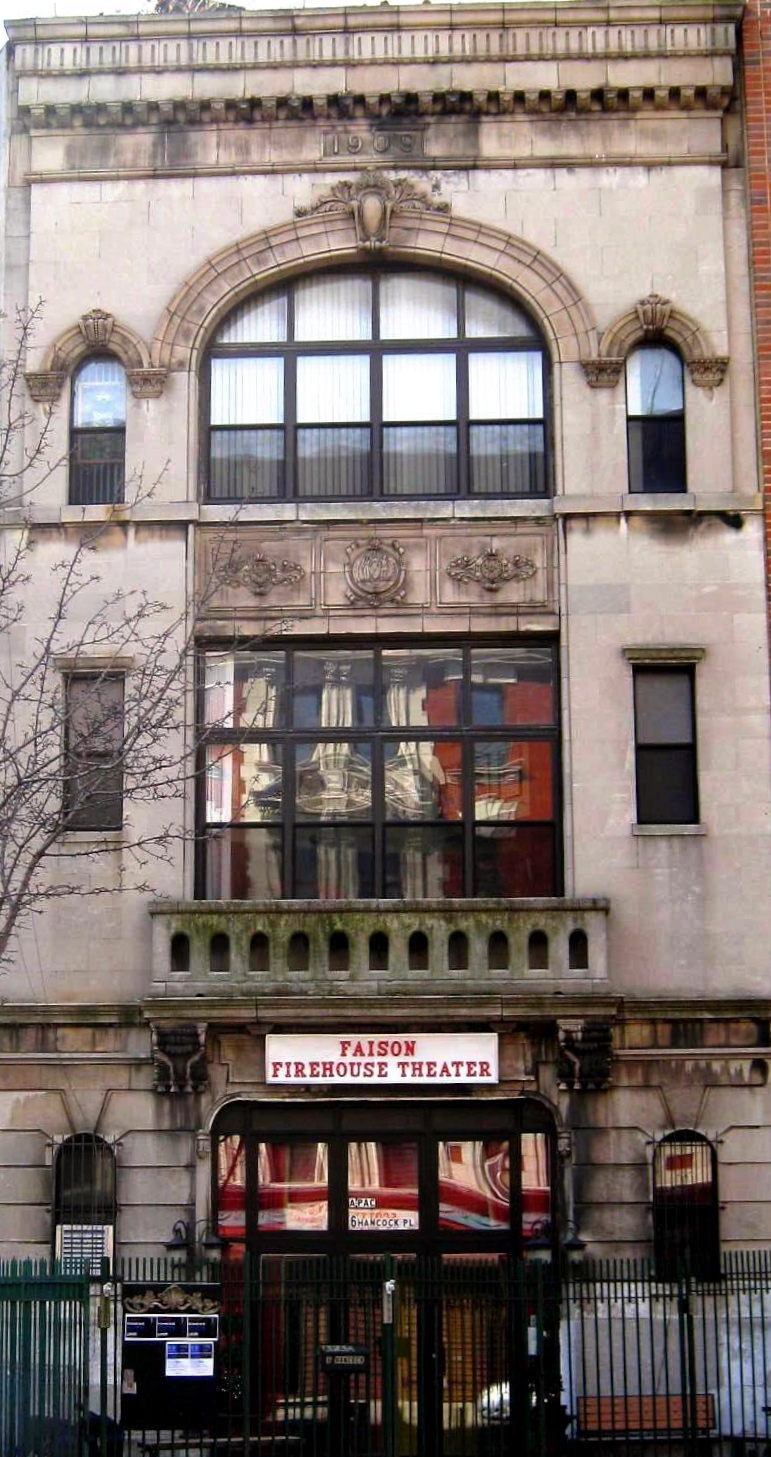
- Interactive map of Faison Firehouse Theater
- Address: 6 Hancock Place; New York City; United States
- Coordinates: 40°48′36.8″N 73°57′13.6″W
- Operator: American Performing Arts Collaborative (APAC)
- Capacity: Main theater: 350

Construction
- Opened: 1909 (Hook and Ladder 40)
- Reopened: 1999, 2007 (official opening)
- Architect: Howard Constable

The Faison Firehouse Theater is a theater in Harlem, New York founded in 1999 by Tony award winning choreographer George Faison and Tad Schnugg. It is operated by the American Performing Arts Collaborative (APAC), a not-for-profit (501c3) founded in 1997.

== History ==
The Beaux Arts firehouse was completed in 1909, and was designed by Philadelphia architect, Howard E. Constable, (known for his design of the Shamokin Station of the Philadelphia and Reading Railroad) to house the Hook and Ladder Company 40. On August 23, 1908, the New York Tribune mentioned the planned firehouse, estimating the cost to be around $40,000 and describing a façade of "ornamental limestone lighted by large mullion bays.” The building is a small reflection of the City Beautiful movement to promote high standards of civic life.

Faison purchased the abandoned firehouse on Hancock Place (one block south of 125th Street) in 1999 and renovated it in several stages. In its present configuration, the building features a 350-seat auditorium, a café, dance and rehearsal space, and a recording studio. The theater is notable for a unique diagonal aisle.

The official inaugural performance at the Faison Firehouse in Fall 2007 featured a presentation by the late author and artist, Maya Angelou, in addition to professional music and dance performances and a performance by APAC youth.

Since 2007, the theater's spaces have hosted music, theater, dance and art exhibitions. The theater has presented performances by the Center for Contemporary Opera and is a regular venue for Harlem Opera Theater.

In 2018 the building was put on the market. In 2026, the National Action Network, a civil-rights organization founded by the Rev. Al Sharpton, purchased the building and plans to rename it the "House of Justice Rev. Jesse Jackson’s Workshop," which will house the new NAN headquarters.
