= Michel Rostain =

French lyric & musical theatre director (born 1942)

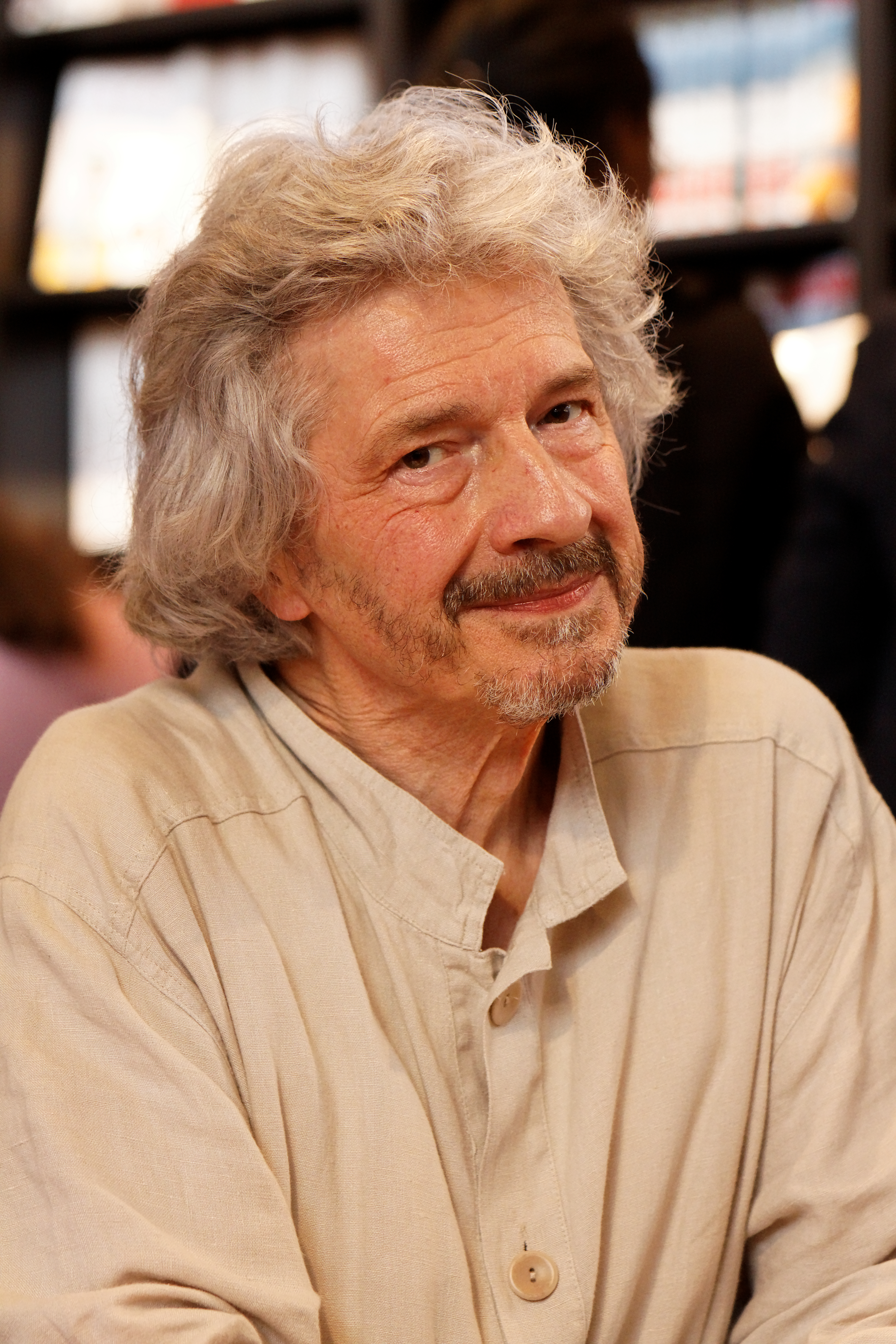
Michel Rostain at Salon Livre Paris in 2011

Michel Rostain (born 28 September 1942, in Mende, Lozère, is a French lyric and musical theater director as well as a writer.

== Biography ==
Michel Rostain began studying music as an autodidact at the age of seven. He pursued this intensely throughout his primary and secondary schooling in Nîmes. He later and more assiduously resumed musical studies (years 1970–1980).

He first taught philosophy in terminal classes, then taught at the Department of Clinical Psychology, Paris VII. At the same time, he worked in a research laboratory in the humanities, the Centre d'études, de recherches et de formation institutionnelles, and the Laborde psychiatric clinic, headed by Félix Guattari and Jean Oury.

At this point in his life, Michel Rostain was able to devote himself to one of the things that was most dear to him with writing, music, and to do it his job. Thus, he founded a lyrical and musical theater company in 1978, and took over the direction of the scène nationale of Quimper in 1995, while continuing to make musical stagings

As director of lyrical and musical theater, Michel Rostain was director of the Théâtre de Cornouaille, scène nationale of Quimper from 1995 to 2008. For more than thirty years, he brought to the scene operas and contemporary lyrical creations. Among his latest shows are Llanto por Ignacio Sanchez Mejias (Garcia Lorca, music by Vicente Pradal, created at the Théâtre national de Toulouse in 1998), Lucia di Lammermoor, (opera by Donizetti, at the Théâtre Les Gémeaux, Scène nationale de Sceaux in 2001). La Désaccordée (by Richard Dubelski after texts by Nancy Huston, created at the Théâtre de Cornouaille, 2003). Zaïde(s), (a show with two works: Zaïde, unfinished opera by Mozart, and Zaïde Actualités, a new opera commissioned to Bernard Cavanna, 2006 at the Théâtre de Cornouaille). Sumidagawa (A lyrical work of the Japanese composer Susumu Yoshida created in Quimper, at the Opéra de Nantes, the Opéra d’Angers, the Japanese cultural House in Paris (French: Maison de la culture du Japon à Paris), the Opéra de Rennes, the Opéra de Montpellier, etc.). In 2008, Michel Rostain staged the new production of Château des Carpathes by Philippe Hersant, at Opéra de Rennes. In 2010, he wrote and performed Sept nouvelles de la douleur, commissioned by the Orchestre de Bretagne for The Seven Last Words of Christ by Joseph Haydn.

== Distinctions ==
- 2002: Chevalier dof the Ordre national du Mérite
- 2009: Chevalier of the Ordre des Arts et des Lettres

== Works ==
=== Novels ===
- 2011: Le Fils, Oh! éditions, about his son who died from purpura fulminans at age 21 in October 2003
- 2013: L'Étoile et la Vieille, Editions Kero
- 2015: Jules, etc. Editions Kero

=== Theatre ===
- 1993: Piano, scène nationale de Mâcon.
- 2015: La Bonne Distance, théâtre de la Poudrerie

=== Essais ===
- 1980: Histoires de La Borde, éditions Recherche
- 1980: Aujourd’hui l’opéra, éditions Recherche
- 1982: L'Opéra mort ou vif, éditions Recherche
- 1985: Journal de répétitions de La Tragédie de Carmen (directed by Peter Brook), éditions du CNRS

=== CD ===
- Récitations (Georges Aperghis)
- Jumelles (Giroudon/Jaffrennou/Rostain)
- Mister Cendron (Marais/Rostain)
- Llanto por Ignacio Sanchez Mejias (Lorca/Pradal)
- Pelleas y Melisanda (Neruda/Pradal)
- Douar Glizh (Ebrel/del Fra)

=== Librettos ===
- La Dame en bleu, music by Francis Régnier, libretto by Michel Rostain, musical tragedy created in 1978 at the Théâtre des Amandiers in Nanterre on the occasion of the Biennale du Théâtre Musical.
- La Baraque rouge, jazz-opera, music by Gérard Marais, libretto by Michel Rostain, created at the Festival of Radio-France and Montpellier in 1985.
- Bastien et Bastienne, opera by Mozart carried out in 1989 by the workshop "Voix, Instruments et Théâtre" under the direction of Martine Joséphine Thomas (1988). French libretto by Michel Rostain.
- Lo sposo deluso, Mozart's unfinished opera, created with the workshop "Voix, Instrument, Théâtre" directed by Michel Rostain and Martine Joséphine Thomas. Reduction for orchestral ensemble by Jean-Claude Pennetier, libretto in French by Michel Rostain.
- Jumelles, electro-acoustic opera by James Giroudon and Pierre-Alain Jaffrennou, libretto by Michel Rostainat for the "Festival Musiques en Scènes" of Lyon (1990),
- The Silent Twins, English translation by Eric Salzman of Jumelles (James Giroudon/Pierre-Alain Jaffrennou/Michel Rostain) for the London International Opera Festival (1992),
- La scala di seta, opera by Rossini, (then L'Échelle de soie, Comédie lyrique by Serge Dutrieux, libretto in French by Michel Rostain after Rossini) created at the Grande halle de la Villette)
- Rossini à domicile, musical theatre, music by Rossini, libretto by Michel Rostain (1992)
- Piano, play by Michel Rostain created on the Scène Nationale of Macon (1993) with Jean-Claude Pennetier, Isabelle Hurtin and Daniel Lecoyer,
- Mister Cendron, jazz-opera by Gérard Marais, libretto by Michel Rostain, created at the Grande Halle de la Villette (1994)
- Petites variations amoureuses et grande fugue, musical theatre by David Ives, translated and directed by Michel Rostain (1996)
- La Prière du loup, music byEric Salzman, libretto by Michel Rostain and Eric Salzman, created at the Théâtre de Cornouaille - Scène Nationale de Quimper (1997) - The Prayer of the Wolf, English adaptation on the occasion of the Music Festival of The Hamptons (États-Unis 2003)
- La Première fois, impromptu theater and music written by Michel Rostain in 1998 on the occasion of the inauguration of the Theater de Cornouaille in Quimper.
- Sextet, musique guerre et paix, lyric poem for Jazz by Gérard Marais, libretto by Philippe Gumplowicz and Michel Rostain, created at the Théâtre de Cornouaille - Scène Nationale of Quimper,
- Sept Nouvelles de la douleur, commission from the Orchestre de Bretagne, created at the Opéra de Rennes (2010) for the presentation of Die sieben letzten Worte unseres Erlösers am Kreuze by Joseph Haydn
