= Michael Dellaira =

American composer

Michael Dellaira (born August 5, 1949) is an American composer. He is a citizen of the United States and Italy and resides in New York City with his wife, the writer Brenda Wineapple.

== Early life and career ==
Dellaira was born Michael Dellario in Schenectady, New York. He legally changed his surname to Dellaira, the original family name, in 1982. He started to play the violin at the age of 8, the clarinet at 12, and in high school became a drummer and lead singer in local rock bands. He enrolled in Georgetown University's School of Foreign Service but graduated in 1971 with a B.A. in philosophy. During these years he learned to play acoustic guitar, performing often in coffee-houses. At The George Washington University he studied composition with Robert Parris and conducting with George Steiner. After receiving his Master of Music degree in 1973, he served as assistant conductor of the Alexandria Symphony. A year later he went to Princeton University, where he studied with Milton Babbitt, Edward T. Cone and Paul Lansky, receiving both an M.F.A and Ph.D. in composition. He spent two summers in residence at The Composers Conference working with Roger Sessions and Mario Davidovsky. Awarded a Fulbright Fellowship in 1977, Dellaira studied in Rome with Goffredo Petrassi at the Academy of Santa Cecilia, privately with Walter Branchi, and in Siena with Franco Donatoni at the Chigiana Academy.

Dellaira has been a recipient of an ASCAP Morton Gould award, a Jerome Commission from the American Composers Forum, and grants from the American Music Center, Cary Trust, Ford Foundation, Mellon Foundation, New York State Council on the Arts, and New Jersey Arts Council. He has taught electronic and computer music in the summer programs at Princeton University, and has been on the music faculties of The George Washington University and Union College. While at Union, Dellaira was also keyboardist and songwriter for the rock group Annette. Their 1982 EP, Annette, was listed as a Billboard Magazine "Top Album Pick."

In 1989 Dellaira was elected vice president of the American Composers Alliance, the oldest composer's service organization in the U.S., a position he held until 2000.

== Musical works ==
Dellaira's 1995 orchestral tone poem Three Rivers was a turning point in his compositional style and voice; in this piece, based on his solo guitar music from the 60's, Dellaira now sought ""the sense of improvisation which occurred when this music flowed freely from heart to fingers, unimpeded by matters of style, theory, or criticism."

Since the year 2000, Dellaira has devoted himself almost exclusively to opera, music-theater, and choral music. In a review of Dellaira's CD Five for Fanfare Magazine Robert Carl wrote: "Dellaira shows a special proclivity and talent for vocal music. Composers such as Bernstein, Rorem, and Glass all seem to be influences, mixed in a way that does not seem easily imitative or derivative. In fact, each of the four vocal works displays an inventive and personal approach to a very different vocal genre and/or challenge."

Chéri, a music-theater work, part opera, part Broadway-musical, is based on Colette's novel of the same name. The libretto is by playwright Susan Yankowitz. Early workshops with the Composers Chamber Theater, American Opera Projects and Center for Contemporary Opera led to an invitation from The Actors Studio to bring the work there for further development. Under the direction of Tony Award-winning actress Carlin Glynn, Chéri underwent a series of revisions, culminating in a workshop production at The Actors Studio in 2005, conducted by Mark Shapiro.

In 2006, the Center for Contemporary Opera appointed Dellaira Composer-in-Residence, after commissioning him and poet J. D. McClatchy to write an opera based on Joseph Conrad's The Secret Agent. The opera, conducted by Sara Jobin and directed by Sam Helfrich, premiered on March 18, 2011, in New York at the Sylvia and Danny Kaye Playhouse. It was performed again that October at the Armel International Opera Festival in Szeged, Hungary, where it was named the Festival's "Laureat", a distinction which led to another performance in April, 2012 at the Opera Théâtre d’Avignon in France.

Dellaira's Nobody, for chorus and oboe, was commissioned by the Syracuse Vocal Ensemble. Based on four poems by Emily Dickinson (each containing the word “nobody”), the work premiered in March, 2012, with Robert Cowles conducting and Anna Stearns Peterson as oboist. It was given its New York premiere by The New Amsterdam Singers on May 28, 2015.

In 2011 Dellaira was commissioned by The Pocket Opera Players to compose the one-act opera The Death of Webern, also on a libretto by J. D. McClatchy. Directed by Thomas Desi and conducted by Carmen Helena-Tellez, The Death of Webern premiered on October 10, 2013, at Symphony Space in New York. The opera was recorded by the Frost School of Music, University of Miami, in 2015, with Alan Johnson conducting. The recording was named one of the "5 Best New Works of 2016" by Opera News magazine.

In 2014 Dellaira and McClatchy started on their third opera together, The Leopard, based on the best-selling 1958 novel by Giuseppe Tomasi di Lampedusa. The work was commissioned by American Opera Projects and premiered in 2022 at the South Miami-Dade Cultural Arts Center by the Frost Opera Theater (at the Frost School of Music), conducted by Gerard Schwarz and directed by Jeffrey Buchman, with music direction by Alan Johnson. The production featured Kim Josephson as Prince Don Fabrizio, Robynne Redmon as Princess Stella, Frank Ragsdale as Father Pirrone, and Kevin Short as Chevalley.

In 2018 Dellaira was commissioned by New Amsterdam Singers and Nancy Manocherian's the cell theatre to create a one-act "folk opera" based on American explorer Elisha Kent Kane's 1856 best-selling Arctic Explorations. Scored for full chorus, five soloists and a chamber ensemble of clarinet, banjo, guitar, violin, viola, double bass and percussion, the work premiered in 2024 at the Theater at St. Jean in New York City, conducted by Clara Longstreth, directed by Kira Simring, with the Harlem Chamber Players. It featured Colin Levin as Elisha Kent Kane, Nicole Haslett as Maggie Fox, Erin Brittain as Lady Jane Franklin, Michael Celentano as President Zachary Taylor, and Inuk drum-dancer Nuka Alice as Inuit shaman Siarnaq.

Dellaira's first theatrical work was the monodrama Maud, for mezzo-soprano accompanied by computer-generated sounds. Featured at the First International Computer Music Conference at M.I.T. in October, 1976, Maud was awarded First Prize the next year by the American Society of University Composers (now the Society of Composers). The work premiered on April 22, 1977, at Carnegie Recital Hall in New York at a concert of the I.S.C.M, with Janet Steele singing.

== Discography ==
- Arctic Explorations; Naxos [8.669054] 2025
- The Leopard; Naxos [8.669052-53] 2024
- The Death of Webern; Albany Records [Troy 1613] 2016
- The Secret Agent; Albany Records [Troy 1450/51] 2013
- Selections from Chéri; Albany Records [Troy 1129] 2009
- Five (The Music of Michael Dellaira - The Stranger, Grief, USA Stories, Three Rivers, This World is not Conclusion, Colored Stones); Albany Records [Troy 487] 2002

Compilations
The Masters on the Movies ("the best of such songeries"); Cantori; [Hobart & William Smith Colleges] 2009
The Campers at Kitty Hawk; on Conspirare's CD Crossing the Divide:Exploring Influence and Finding Our Voice -- American Masterpieces Festival
The Campers at Kitty Hawk on the Choral Composer/Conductor Collective's (C4) 2016 CD Volume 2: Cornerstones
Three Rivers ("The Orchestra According to the Seven") [Opus One 170] 1996
Art and Isadora ("To Orpheus") [CRI 615] 1992
Maud ("the green album") [Opus One 146] 1987
Annette; [Primadonna P-5101] 1982
Problems / The Other Way Around - The Heathens, 45-RPM [Vibra L-104] 1967; "Off the Wall"; "Back From The Grave"
