= Everybody's All-American (film) =

1988 film by Taylor Hackford

- Theatrical release poster
- Directed by: Taylor Hackford
- Written by: Thomas Rickman
- Based on: Everybody's All-American by Frank Deford
- Produced by: Taylor Hackford; Ian Sander; Laura Ziskin
- Starring: Jessica Lange; Dennis Quaid; Timothy Hutton; John Goodman; Carl Lumbly
- Cinematography: Stephen Goldblatt
- Edited by: Don Zimmerman
- Music by: James Newton Howard
- Distributed by: Warner Bros. Pictures
- Release date: November 4, 1988
- Running time: 127 minutes
- Country: United States
- Language: English
- Budget: $22 million
- Box office: $12.6 million

Everybody's All-American is a 1988 American sports drama film, released internationally as When I Fall in Love, directed by Taylor Hackford and based on the 1981 novel Everybody's All-American by longtime Sports Illustrated contributor Frank Deford.

The film covers 25 years in the life of college football hero Gavin Grey. It stars Dennis Quaid, Jessica Lange, Timothy Hutton and John Goodman.

== Plot ==
Gavin Grey is a 1950s star athlete known by the moniker "The Grey Ghost," who plays football at Louisiana State University. His campus girlfriend Babs Rogers, nephew Donnie "Cake" McCaslin, and teammate Ed Lawrence adore his personality and charm. During the Sugar Bowl game, Gavin's play, defining his competitiveness throughout his career, causes a player from the opposing team to fumble the ball, which he returns to score a game-winning touchdown.

As his college days come to an end, Gavin ends up marrying Babs, starts a family, and gets drafted by the Washington Redskins. Lawrence opens a popular sports bar in Baton Rouge. Everyone is pleased for Gavin, including his friendly rival Narvel Blue, who might have achieved professional stardom had he chosen an athletic career path. Reality quickly sets in for Gavin as life in the NFL is difficult, the competition is fierce, and the schedule is grueling. Gavin is a respectable running back for the Redskins, but hardly the idol worshipped by everyone back home during his school years. Concurrently, Lawrence has accrued a number of gambling debts. He is later murdered by unidentified attackers, creating more debts for Gavin and Babs, who had invested in Lawrence's business.

Babs does her best to keep up with Gavin's career and mood swings, and in doing so inherits the role of the wage earner in their household after he briefly retires. A sympathetic Donnie finds her frustrated and lonely, as his lifetime attraction to her brings them together for a brief extramarital affair. Gavin's financial setbacks encourage Babs to seek a job from Narvel to manage his restaurant.

During his retirement, money issues convince Gavin to accept a comeback offer from the Denver Broncos. The new NFL has passed him by, though, and Gavin is forced to accept that his playing days are over. He enters a failed business relationship with entrepreneur Bolling Kiely, whom he despises, spending countless hours telling old college football stories to clients. Donnie moves on with his life, becoming an author and getting engaged to a sophisticated woman named Leslie Stone, while supporting Gavin and Babs through a marital breakdown. A lost and pathetic figure, in the end, Gavin mends his relationship with Babs as he spends his withdrawal from professional sports reminiscing about his famed athletic youth.

== Cast ==
- Jessica Lange as Babs Rogers Grey
- Dennis Quaid as Gavin "Grey Ghost" Grey
- Timothy Hutton as Donnie "Cake" McCaslin
- John Goodman as Ed "Bull" Lawrence
- Carl Lumbly as Narvel Blue
- Ray Baker as Bolling Kiely
- Savannah Smith Boucher as Darlene Kiely
- Patricia Clarkson as Leslie Stone
- Wayne Knight as Fraternity Pisser

== Production ==
Filming was stopped for weeks when Dennis Quaid had his collarbone broken by former New England Patriots cornerback Tim Fox during filming. Footage of Quaid rolling in pain on the sidelines of the snow game appears in the finished film. A key scene featuring a candlelight parade involving large numbers of extras was filmed, on the steps of the Louisiana State Capitol, when snow started falling. Despite the beauty of the scene, director Taylor Hackford elected to reshoot the scene, as snow in Baton Rouge in November was such a rare event that he was worried it would be seen as a special effects goof in the film.

The game scenes were shot in Louisiana State University's Tiger Stadium during the halftimes of actual LSU games in 1987. The goalposts were altered to resemble the vintage "H" posts as needed during filming. Vertical posts were moved in place for the bottom portion of the H, and a multi-colored fabric covering was used to conceal the "modern" center support post. Upon completion of filming, the vertical posts and fabric were retracted so as not to interfere with the LSU games. In late 1993, LSU installed an updated model of the vintage posts permanently in the stadium. Some of the filming of the football scenes took place during halftime of the LSU-Alabama game on November 7, 1987. The producers wanted to continue shooting some scenes following the game, so they requested that the LSU fans remain after the game so that they could finish the scenes. However, Alabama won in an upset, and ten minutes after the game, the only fans still in the bleachers were wearing crimson, forcing the producers to finish shooting the following week (November 14) following LSU's game with Mississippi State, a 34–14 win.

Michael Apted was all set to direct Thomas Rickman's script in 1982 until Warner Bros. Pictures balked at the $16 million price tag, leading man Tommy Lee Jones and the fact that American football movies never do any business overseas. During its six years in development hell, Warren Beatty, Robert Redford, and Robert De Niro all circled the project.

Despite the fact that the novel by Frank Deford was written about the University of North Carolina (which refused to allow filming because they suspected the story defamed campus legend Charlie "Choo Choo" Justice), when it was filmed at LSU, rumors started that Gavin Grey (Dennis Quaid) was based on the former LSU All-American Billy Cannon. He won the Heisman Trophy in 1959 and played eleven seasons for three professional teams, but served two and a half years in federal prison in the mid-1980s for his role in a counterfeiting ring. Deford himself denies this, saying: "Never met Cannon and knew nothing about him personally," he says. "Gavin was strictly a composite of many athletes from several sports that I had covered."

The film contains a much more hopeful and upbeat ending than the book, where Gavin takes his own life after trying to kill his wife Babs Rogers Grey as well.

== Reception ==
Reaction to the film was mostly mixed. Review aggregator Rotten Tomatoes gives it a 44% rating based on 32 reviews, with an average rating of 5.2/10. Audiences polled by CinemaScore gave the film an average grade of "B+" on an A+ to F scale.

== See also ==
- List of American football films
