= Jadrien Steele =

American actor

Jadrien Ford Steele (born November 22, 1974, in New York City) is an American actor, author, and film director. As an author, he writes under the name J M Steele.

== Biography ==
Steele graduated from Princeton University, and later obtained a master's degree in Cinematography at the University of Southern California. He is the son of two New Yorkers, Walanne Steele (a broker) and Jerry Steele (an academic). As an infant he was cast in the long-running television soap opera Ryan's Hope as the Little John Ryan from 1975 to 1985 when he turned 11 years old. Steele received his first major role the following year, playing Jerry Fox in the film The Mosquito Coast, where he starred alongside Harrison Ford, Helen Mirren, and River Phoenix. He married Sarah Elizabeth Bagley in 2009.

== Authorship ==
Steele has written two books for young adult readers. He has also written several short plays. One of these, "Silent Mercury", was made into a short film, which Steele himself directed, and premiered at the 2001 Sundance Film Festival. In 2008 he both directed and acted in his own production of another of his short dramas, "Just Make Believe".

== Filmography ==
=== Cinema ===
- The Mosquito Coast (1986) - Jerry
- Approaching Union Square (2006) - Brad's Friend (segment "The Ex-Girlfiriend")
- Just Make Believe (2008, Short) - Gavin
- Victoriana (2012) - Tim Becker

=== Television ===
- Ryan's Hope (1975-1985) - Little John Ryan
- The Hogan Family (1 episode, 1986) - Max
- Crossbow (1 episode, 1987) - Simon
- The Secret Garden (1987, TV Movie) - Colin Craven
- American Playhouse (1 episode, 1988) - Gordon Aged 11
- A Father's Homecoming (1988, TV Movie) - Miles

=== As director ===
- "Silent Mercury" (2001)
- "Just Make Believe" (2008)
- "Winter Fugue'" (2010)

== Bibliography ==
- The Taker (as J M Steele, 2006) ISBN 978-1-4395-8173-5
- The Market (as J M Steele, 2008) ISBN 978-1-4231-0013-3
