= Alex: The Life of a Child =

1983 book and 1986 film

- Author: Frank Deford
- Language: English
- Genre: Nonfiction
- Publication date: 1983
- Publication place: United States

Alex: The Life of a Child is a biography and film about the life and death of Alexandra Deford from cystic fibrosis. After her death in 1980 at the age of eight, her father, Frank Deford, a sportswriter, was inspired to write a memoir about Alex three years later. The book depicts Alex's determination to make the best of her circumstances and brings awareness to the disease that took her life.

The book was adapted into a 1986 ABC film directed by Robert Markowitz and starring Craig T. Nelson as Frank Deford, Bonnie Bedelia as Carol Deford, and Gennie James as Alex Deford.

== Production ==
Frank Deford pieced together a collection of his own memories and that of his wife, Carol, as well as interactions from Alex's classmates, nurses, and hospital volunteers. The story of her life is mostly written in chronological order with certain recollections from her final years weaved in between. The final pages are an epilogue describing the Deford family's experiences after her death.

== Synopsis ==
Due to the progression of her disease, Alexandra grew thin and could barely laugh without pronounced coughing from the accumulated mucus in her lungs. Her nails took on a clubbed appearance characteristic of the lack of oxygen due to CF, and her father recalled their being a source of anxiety and embarrassment for Alex as they drew unwanted attention from strangers. Her daily routine consisted of taking various medications and getting her chest "percussed" (postural drainage) by her parents to clear her lungs of mucus, which Frank Deford described as an unpleasant and painful experience for Alex. The book depicted Alex's distress with her recurrent visits to the hospital and feeling lonesome and missing her home and family as well as social activities. Her classmates portrayed Alex as a child that did not use her disease to draw personal attention to herself and that she loved to laugh and be involved in everything. Many chapters of the book show Alex's love for dress-up and elaborate jewelry that was gaudy and glittering. Frank Deford wrote of several instances during Alex's illness in which she would have insight into matters that were precocious for children her age. She was protective of and concerned about her family; frequently diverting them from being sad in moments when she was hurting. She was especially worried about her older brother Christian, who she felt might feel overshadowed by the attention her disease was consuming. As the years went by, she began to ask more and more questions about death of those she entrusted to tell her the truth, as she was beginning to come to terms with and realize her fate.

The start of third grade was the beginning of the end for Alex when she had a pneumothorax (collapsed lung) after experiencing prior lung hemorrhages (hemoptysis). After a minor improvement, she suffered a second lung collapse, which was initially dismissed when the on-call doctor ignored Alex's severe symptoms. After this setback, her illness progressively worsened. Due to Alex's advanced lung disease, and the risk of further hemoptysis and another potential collapse, Alex's doctor advised the Defords discontinue her chest therapy. After her release from hospital, Alex's condition deteriorated markedly. She survived through the holidays. On January 19, 1980, Alex died in her home surrounded by her parents.

Exactly a year after their daughter's burial, Frank and Carol Deford adopted a baby girl from the Philippines. Frank was apprehensive at the idea of what he initially felt would be "replacing" Alex. Carol pointed out that their adopting a child would fulfill one of Alex's nightly prayers; that poor children might come to the United States. Frank dedicated Alex's memoir to his adopted daughter Scarlet so that she would understand Alex's struggle with cystic fibrosis.

== Reception ==
John O'Connor wrote about the film depiction of Deford's book of Alex in a review for The New York Times, writing it is "generally shrewd enough to let the intrinsically affecting story tell itself. For the most part, there is no belaboring the obvious. This is an instance where a television movie decidedly transcends its formula." In the Richmond Times review: "Don't miss 'Alex: The Life of a Child'." Katherine Phillips states that "The painful realities of cystic fibrosis are given stark visual life – a romp with her father leaves Alex coughing blood, and the inability to catch her breath leaves her crying in helpless fright and anger." Reviewing for The San Francisco Chronicle, Donald Chase writes that Alex's "extraordinary, heart-rending humor and nobility during her painful ordeal" are "captured in the film".

Frank Deford and the book were listed as a stepping stone to advancing the wider awareness of cystic fibrosis, and of the Cystic Fibrosis Foundation, where Deford was on the Board of Trustees from 1982 to 1999.
