= Sara Jobin =

American conductor

- Born: October 26, 1970 (age 56); Norwood, Massachusetts
- Genre: Classical
- Occupation: Conductor
- Years active: 1993–present
- Education: Harvard and Radcliffe Colleges

Sara Jobin (JOH-bin; born October 26, 1970) is an American conductor. She is currently the principal conductor of the Center for Contemporary Opera.

== Early life and education ==
Jobin was born in Norwood, Massachusetts, and grew up in various suburbs of Boston and New York. At age 16, she was accepted into Harvard College, where she attended from 1987 to 1992 and earned a bachelor's degree in music and women's studies. During her time at Harvard, she would take private piano lessons with Patricia Zander, a faculty member at the New England Conservatory of Music. Between 1992 and 1996, she studied at the Pierre Monteux School in Maine with Charles Bruck during the summer.

== Early career ==
Unlike many conductors, Jobin has always pursued operatic and symphonic engagements simultaneously. In 1992, she moved to San Francisco where she soon gained the position of assistant conductor with the Palo Alto Philharmonic. In 1995, she also became the assistant conductor of Opera San Jose, a position she held until 1999. In 1996, she won the job of assistant conductor of the Peninsula Symphony. In 1998, she left the Peninsula Symphony to become the Founding Music Director of the Tassajara Symphony Orchestra. In 1999 she joined the music staff of the San Francisco Opera as a prompter and quickly became a rehearsal conductor and then staff conductor.

== Career ==
In 2004, Jobin made her debut with the San Francisco Opera and became the first woman to conduct mainstage subscription performances in the War Memorial Opera House. She returned three times to the main stage in the next few years and also led two productions in Zellerbach Hall in Berkeley in conjunction with Cal Performances. In 2006, Jobin was the first woman to conduct the Arizona Opera. In 2010, her first opera recording, Volpone by John Musto, was nominated for a Grammy. In 2011, she became the chief conductor for the Center for Contemporary Opera. Between 2015 and 2018, she was the resident conductor of the Toledo Symphony and associate conductor for the Toledo Opera.

Guest conducting engagements have included the San Jose Chamber Orchestra, Alberta Ballet, San Francisco Ballet, Livermore Valley Opera, the San Francisco Opera Center, The Women's Philharmonic, Orchestra of St. Luke's, Tacoma Opera, Arizona Opera, Berkeley Opera, West Bay Opera, Wolf Trap Opera, Symphony Silicon Valley, Anchorage Opera, Dayton Philharmonic, New York Shakespeare Festival, Greater Grand Forks Symphony, San Francisco Contemporary Music Players, Bochumer Symphoniker, Opera Idaho, Musiqa Houston, The Little Orchestra Society, Opera Santa Barbara, Pittsburgh Opera, Toledo Opera, Syracuse Society for New Music, Albany Pro Musica, Lenape Center, American Opera Projects, Opera America New Works Showcase, Los Angeles Opera, Los Angeles Philharmonic and OperaDelaware.

== San Francisco Opera performances ==
Date	Composer	Work	Notable Lead
Nov. 7, 2004	Puccini	Tosca	Carol Vaness
Dec. 1, 2004	Wagner	Der Fliegende Holländer	Nina Stemme
Fall 2005	Bellini	Norma	
Fall 2007	Philip Glass	Appomattox	
Summer 2008	Rachel Portman	The Little Prince	
March 2013	Nolan Gasser	The Secret Garden	

== Personal life ==
Jobin is a judo black belt and international competitor, having won national championships for Ju-no-Kata in both 1998 and 2006. From 2001 to 2009, Jobin sang with the Glide Ensemble, the gospel choir featured in the movie The Pursuit of Happyness with Will Smith Jobin also enjoys studying the teachings of Hazrat Inayat Khan on mysticism and music.
