= Center for Contemporary Opera =

The Center for Contemporary Opera (CCO) is a professional opera company based in New York City, and a member of OPERA America. The company focuses on producing and developing new opera and music theater works and reviving rarely seen American operas written after the Second World War. The Center for Contemporary Opera has staged the premieres of many works written during the latter half of the twentieth century. Works are performed at all stages of development from readings to workshops to full productions on the professional stage. In line with its mission to promote an interest in new operatic and music-theater culture among the American public, the company presents panel discussions and colloquia, and publishes a bi-annual newsletter Opera Today. Since 2004, the company has been a regular participant in the New York City Opera's annual festival, "Vox: Showcasing American Composers".

The company was founded in 1982 by Richard Marshall, formerly the head of the Charlotte Opera Association in North Carolina where he had commissioned, produced and conducted the world premiere of Robert Ward's Abelard and Heloise. In March 2008, James E. Schaeffer, Executive Director of Long Leaf Opera Festival in Chapel Hill, North Carolina took over from Marshall as General Director. The composer, author and music critic Eric Salzman was named Artistic Director, and served in this role until 2012, when he became the company's Composer-in-Residence until his death in 2017. After James Schaeffer's retirement, Francesca Campagna was named General Director in 2019. The Principal Conductor of CCO is Sara Jobin.

== Notable premieres ==
Notable premieres performed by the Center for Contemporary Opera include:

- Tomorrow and Tomorrow by Timothy Sullivan (World Premiere 1987)
- Christopher Sly by Dominick Argento (New York Premiere 1987)
- Insect Comedy - Martin Kalmanoff and Lewis Allen (World Premiere, 1993)
- Transformations by Conrad Susa and Anne Sexton (New York Premiere, 1996)
- Summer by Stephen Paulus and Joan Vail Thorne (New York Premiere, 1998)
- Sorry, Wrong Number by Jack Beeson and Lucille Fletcher (World Premiere, 1999)
- The Postman Always Rings Twice by Stephen Paulus and Colin Graham (New York Premiere, 1998)
- KAFKA: Letter to My Father by Stanley Walden (U. S. Premiere, 2000)
- Doctor Faustus Lights the Lights by Stanley Walden and Gertrude Stein (U.S. Premiere 2002)
- La Priere du Loup by Eric Salzman (U. S. Premiere, 2003)
- Vera of Las Vegas by Daron Hagen and Paul Muldoon (World Staged Premiere, 2003)
- A More Perfect Union by Victoria Bond and Isaiah Sheffer (World Premiere, 2004)"
- Mario and the Magician by Francis Thorne and J.D. McClatchy (First professional performance 2005)
- Alice by Peter Westergaard (World Premiere of work in progress 2006)
- The Secret Agent by Michael Dellaira and J. D. McClatchy
- Review by Jeremy Beck and Patricia Marx (World Premiere, 2010)
- Jane Eyre by Louis Karchin (World Premiere, 2016)

== Recording ==
- Francis Thorne: Mario and the Magician (Center for Contemporary Opera, Richard Marshall, conductor, Justin Vickers, Larry Small, Jessica Grigg, Wendy Brown, Richard Cassell) Albany Records TROY832
- Peter Westergaard: Alice in Wonderland (Center for Contemporary Opera, Michael Pratt, conductor, Jennifer Winn, Amaia Urtiaga, Karen Joliceur, Marshall Coid, David Kellett, Eric Jordan) Albany Records TROY1198
- Michael Dellaira: The Secret Agent (Center for Contemporary Opera, Sara Jobin, conductor, Amy Burton, Scott Bearden, Jonathan Blalock, Matthew Boehler, Aaron Theno, Matthew Garrett, Jason Papowitz, David Neal, Jody Karem, Cherry Duke, Deborah Lifton, Sarah Miller, Kate Oberjat) Albany Records TROY1450-51
