= Philippe Gumplowicz =

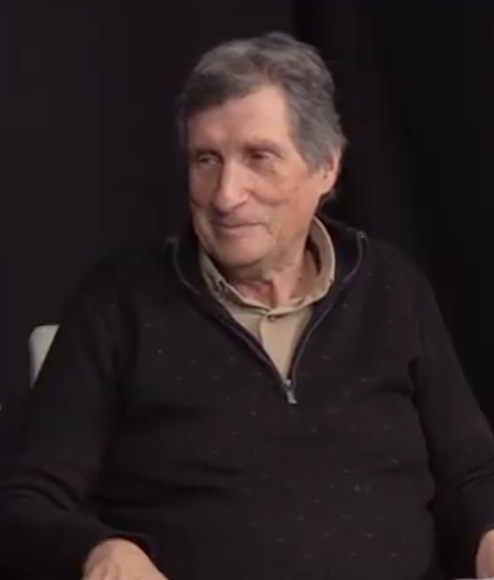
- In a 2025 interview
- Born: 6 October 1950 (age 75); Paris, France
- Education: Sorbonne University
- Occupations: Musicologist, historian

Philippe Gumplowicz (born 6 October 1950) is a French professor of universities, musicologist and music historian.

== Biography ==
His parents, a couple of Polish Jews, emigrated to France in 1933. As a young man, Gumplowicz bathed in the "Zionist and Marxist" youth movements. He studied history and passed his master's degree at the Sorbonne University in 1972. Passionate about music, he financed his studies by playing in a jazz orchestra. He then studied social science and became passionate about psychoanalysis which he abandoned in the 1970s. He then worked on the history of musical institutions, such as the Conservatoire de Paris and the Théâtre national de l'Opéra-Comique. He defended his thesis in the mid-1980s on orphéons in France, these amateur musical societies which in the 19th century appeared in the villages and towns of Europe. Gumplowicz teaches at the Conservatoire de Paris, the École des hautes études en sciences sociales and the University of Évry Val d'Essonne where he is the director of RASM (Recherches Arts Spectacles Musiques).

He produced for France Musique and France Culture programs and documentaries (Les Grands entretiens with pianist Jean-Claude Pennetier in 2010, Israeli historian Zeev Sternhell in April 2011 or singer Michel Delpech in October 2012) as well as documentaries such as Les années Barclay Une histoire de Haute fidélité in June 2012.

He can be heard playing the acoustic guitar in two songs of the album Innocence by Antoine Tomé, appeared in 1979.

== Publications ==
- 1988 – Les Travaux d'Orphée, on Persée, Éditions Aubier-Montaigne (Book from his thesis, reissued in 2001)
- 1991 – Le Roman du jazz. Première époque, 1893–1930, Fayard
- 2000 – Le Roman du jazz. Deuxième époque, 1930–1942, Fayard
- 2008 – Le Roman du jazz. Les modernes, Fayard
- 2012 – Les Résonances de l'ombre, musique et identités de Wagner au jazz, Fayard
