= Gennie James =

American former child actress

- Born: December 27, 1976 (age 49); Navasota, Texas, U.S.
- Occupation: Retired actress
- Notable work: The Secret Garden

Gennie James (born December 27, 1976) is an American former child actress.

She acted in several television movies and series between 1984 and 1988 and had the main role in 1987's The Secret Garden as young Mary Lennox.

She won a Young Artist Award in 1987 for Papa Was a Preacher. She was nominated on three additional occasions: in 1985 for Places in the Heart, in 1987 for Alex: The Life of a Child and in 1989 for The Secret Garden.

== Filmography ==
- 1988: The River Pirates, Rivers Applewhite
- 1988: CBS Summer Playhouse (episode My Africa), Sara Marston
- 1987: Broadcast News, Young Jane Craig
- 1987: The Secret Garden, Young Mary Lennox
- 1987: Amazing Stories (episode Without Diana), Diana Willoughby
- 1986: The Christmas Gift, Alexandra 'Alex' Billings
- 1986: A Smoky Mountain Christmas, Cindy
- 1986: Alex: The Life of a Child, Alex Deford
- 1986: If Tomorrow Comes (episode 1.1), Amy Brannigan
- 1985: Papa Was a Preacher, Alyene
- 1985: The Hugga Bunch, Bridget Severson
- 1984: Places in the Heart, Possum Spalding
