= Nolan Gasser =

American classical composer (born 1964)

- Born: November 10, 1964 (age 61); La Mirada, California
- Occupations: Composer, musicologist, pianist, artistic director

Nolan Ira Gasser (born November 10, 1964) is an American composer, pianist, and musicologist. He was the chief musicologist for Pandora Media, Inc. and the architect of the Music Genome Project, the proprietary musical analysis system that underlies the popular Internet radio service. His classical compositions have been performed by orchestras, chamber ensembles, and soloists around the world, in such venues as Carnegie Hall, the Kennedy Center, and the Rose Bowl.

Gasser scored his first film soundtrack, for Lance Kinsey's comedy All-Stars (starring Fred Willard and John Goodman), which was released in October 2014. Gasser was the subject of the documentary, “Musicology”, as part of “the Collectors” series on prominent data collectors / purveyors, by Nate Silver's FiveThirtyEight and ESPN Films.

Gasser is the Artistic Director of Classical Archives, a leading online classical musical service.

Gasser received his Ph.D. in musicology from Stanford University. He frequently performs as well as lectures around the United States – on music, and the relationship between music and science. He is also working with the Chicago-based company Mission Metrics, to help develop an Impact Genome Project, on behalf of social impact program measurement across all social sectors (education, food security, poverty, culture and identity, health, etc.). The project has been subject to critique by the social science community who cite its opaque methodology and oversimplication of complex social issues.

== Early life ==
Gasser began playing piano at age 4, and was composing by age 8. His professional career began at age 11, when he became the weekend pianist at the newly built La Mirada Mall – for which he credits his eclectic musical identity, being fluent in pop, rock, jazz, Broadway, and classical styles.

== Education ==
In 1988, Gasser received a Bachelor's degree in music from California State University, Northridge, where he studied composition with Aurelio de la Vega, and piano with Charles Fierro.

Gasser then sojourned to Paris for two years, where he studied privately with Betsy Jolas and at Fontainebleau with Jolas, Gilbert Amy, and Tristan Murail. While in Paris, he began a fascination with Renaissance music (especially the music of Josquin des Prez), spawning an interest in musicology.

In 1991, Gasser earned a Masters in composition at New York University in New York, where he studied with Todd Brief and Menachem Zur. In 2001, Gasser earned a PhD. in musicology from Stanford University in California. Gasser's dissertation was "The Marian Motet Cycles of the Gaffurius Codices: A Musical and Liturgico-Devotional Study".

== Career ==
In March 2000, Gasser was hired by Savage Beast Technologies (today Pandora Media, Inc.), where he helped flesh out the Music Genome Project. Gasser became the Chief Musicologist at Pandora, and is the architect of all five Music Genomes (Pop/Rock, Jazz, Hip-hop/Electronica; World Music; Classical); he also helped design the means of analysis and training by which the company continues to this day, as the hugely successful Pandora Radio service.

In April 2003, Gasser became the Artistic Director of the Classical Archives website, which in May 2009 re-launched as a streaming and download service with classical content from most labels. Gasser designed for the site a proprietary database to properly categorize and display classical recordings, and runs the editorial operation – including conducting interviews with classical artists and composers such as Renée Fleming, Hilary Hahn, Alan Gilbert, Hélène Grimaud, Vladimir Ashkenazy, Jeremy Denk, Daniel Hope, David Lang, Eric Whitacre, and John Corigliano.

Gasser is active as a pianist and bandleader, especially in jazz and popular styles – including with the San Francisco Jazz Quartet;. He is an occasional adjunct professor in Medieval-Renaissance music history at Stanford University. He periodically gives lectures, such as at the Carmel Authors and Ideas Festival in 2010, at the University of California, Santa Barbara in February 2011, and at a joint meeting of the National Endowment for the Arts and the United States Department of Health and Human Services in Washington, D.C., regarding arts education.

=== Composition ===
Gasser's shift in focus to musicology, beginning in 1991, led to an extended disruption in his compositional output, with only a handful of works written before his graduation from Stanford in 2001. Since 2003, however, composition has become a principal focus of his career.

Among his substantial works include American Festivals – a four-movement work with poetry by Robert Trent Jones Jr.; each movement is dedicated to a distinct and quintessential American holiday: "Oration on July 4th" (2004), "Black Suite Blues" (for Martin Luther King Jr. Day; 2005); "Memorial Day" (2006); and "Thanksgiving" (2007). The work has been performed – in part and whole – numerous times by several orchestras (e.g., Charleston, Memphis, Arkansas, and Oakland East Bay Symphonies), including a complete performance at the 2008 IMG Festival del sole (Napa Valley, CA.).

Gasser's most ambitious composition project in recent years has been a pair of works written in conjunction with NASA's Fermi Gamma-Ray Space Telescope (formerly GLAST) – launched June 8, 2008. The first work, the GLAST Prelude, for brass quintet (2007), was recorded by the American Brass Quintet, and presented at a pre-launch party in Cocoa Beach, the live premiere took place on November 2, 2009, at the Kennedy Center for the Performing Arts in Washington, D.C., and the work was released on the ABQ's 50th Anniversary CD on Summit Records.

The same Kennedy Center concert also saw the premiere of the second Fermi-related work, the narrated symphony Cosmic Reflection, with narration by Pierre Schwob and physicist Lawrence Krauss that tells the full history of the Universe. The work was recorded by the Baltimore Symphony under Marin Alsop, and will be subsequently released as a full-feature DVD.

Among other serious works include his World Cello for Cello and Orchestra (2008), which was premiered by cellist Maya Beiser and the Oakland East Bay Symphony under Michael Morgan, along with three "world" soloists: Jiebing Chen, erhu; Aruna Narayan, sarangi; and Bassam Saba, oud. His 3 Jazz Preludes (2007) were performed at Carnegie Hall by pianist Kimball Gallagher in March 2008. His opera The Secret Garden, commissioned by the San Francisco Opera, premiered on 1 March 2013; the opera was also performed at Opera Theater of Weston (Vermont) in January 2015. Gasser wrote the opening movement of the choral song cycle Tyler's Suite, about the tragic story of Tyler Clementi (with other movements by Stephen Schwartz, John Corigliano, and Jake Heggie, among others), which was premiered in March 2014 by the San Francisco Gay Men's Chorus at Davies Symphony Hall in San Francisco, and which will be performed subsequently in Los Angeles, Dallas, and New York. His song cycle Repast: An Oratorio, about the life and career of civil rights figure Booker Wright, with text by Kevin Young, will be premiered on October 26, 2014, by bass-baritone Justin Hopkins at the Southern Foodways Alliance Symposium in Oxford, Mississippi

=== Publications ===
Gasser's book, Why You Like It: The Science and Culture of Musical Taste (Macmillan Publishing) was released on April 30, 2019.

== Personal life ==
In 1994, Gasser married Lynn. They have two children, Camille (b. 1995) and Preston (b. 2001). Gasser and his family reside in Petaluma, California.

== Discography and media ==
- GLAST Prelude on YouTube
- GLAST Prelude on State of the Art: The American Brass Quintet at 50 (Summit Records, 2010)
- San Francisco Jazz Quartet, Ode to Swing (Mundana Nova, 2011)
- "Montana Home" (lyrics and sung by Jim Salestrom) on Beneath the Big Sky (Rebecca Records, 2008)
- "Christmas by the Bay" (lyrics by Clark Sterling; Tim Hockenberry, vocals) on Christmas by the Bay (Sterling Performances, 2003)
- "Life is a Beautiful Song" (lyrics and sung by Jim Salestrom) on Safe Home (Rebecca Records, 2001)
