= Steve Heitzeg =

American composer (born 1959)

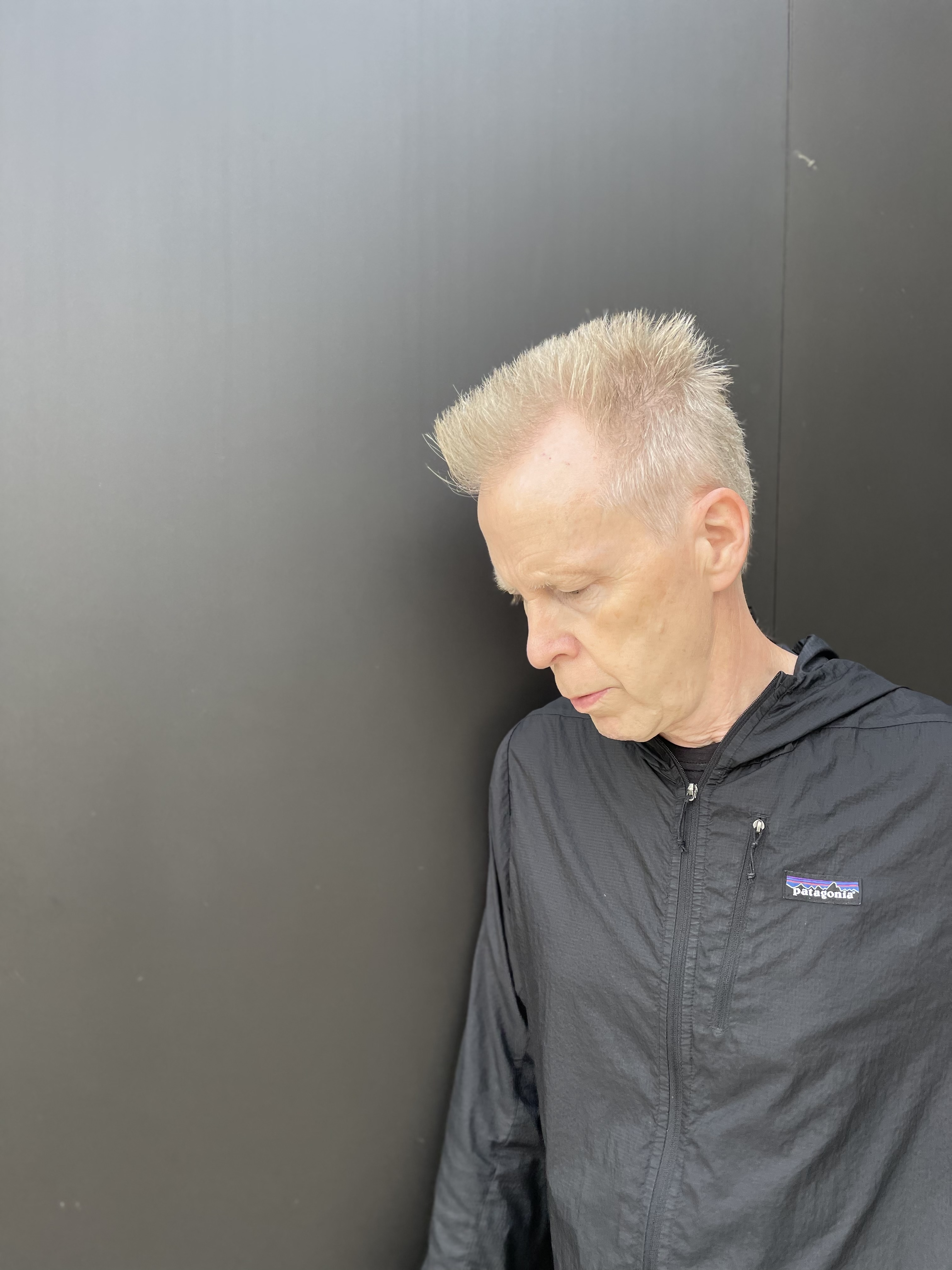
- Born: October 15, 1959 (age 67); Albert Lea, Minnesota
- Education: University of Minnesota, Gustavus Adolphus College
- Musical career
- Genre: Contemporary classical music
- Occupation: Composer
- Years active: 1970s–present
- Labels: Innova Recordings, Stone Circle Music
- Website: steveheitzeg.com

Steve Heitzeg (born October 15, 1959) is an American composer whose works include compositions for orchestra, chorus, chamber ensemble, ballet, and film.

His work is well known for themes of environmentalism and social justice, and often incorporates unusual instrumentation with ecological or thematic resonance, such as stones, driftwood, and whale bones. He has written more than 150 compositions since the late 1970s, including the award-winning On the Day You Were Born, his 2001 Nobel Symphony, and soundtracks for films, including PBS's Death of the Dream (which won an Upper Midwest Emmy Award) and A Marriage: Georgia O'Keeffe and Alfred Stieglitz.

Heitzeg's music has been performed by orchestras and ensembles across the US and Europe, including the Minnesota Orchestra, Atlanta Symphony, Houston Symphony, Des Moines Symphony, Philadelphia Orchestra, Detroit Symphony, Auckland Philharmonia, Florida Orchestra, Dale Warland Singers, VocalEssence and James Sewell Ballet. His works have been performed by conductors including Marin Alsop, Philip Brunelle, Michael Butterman, William Eddins, JoAnn Falletta, Joseph Giunta, Giancarlo Guerrero, Sarah Hicks, Jahja Ling, Lawrence Renes, Christopher Seaman, Mischa Santora, Joseph Silverstein, André Raphel Smith, Thomas Søndergård, Yan Pascal Tortelier, Osmo Vänskä, and Dale Warland.

== Early life ==
Heitzeg was born in Albert Lea, Minnesota, and grew up on a dairy farm near the town of Kiester. In high school, he played trombone in marching band, guitar in jazz band, and sang in the choir. He also wrote a rock opera, P.S., based on the story of the prodigal son.

After graduating from Gustavus Adolphus College in St. Peter, Minnesota, in 1982, he earned his PhD in musical composition at the University of Minnesota in 1986, studying under Dominick Argento and Eric Stokes. His dissertation was the 1985 composition Nine Surrealist Studies (After Salvador Dali), inspired by the Spanish surrealist painter, which was premiered in 1987 by the Florida Orchestra. Kurt Loft of the Tampa Tribune praised the work, calling Heitzeg "a serious composer with much to say" and adding that Nine Surrealist Studies "suggests the enigma of time and the irrational dream world that so fascinated the famed Spanish painter."

== Artistic philosophy and musical style ==
Kurt Loft of the Tampa Tribune wrote, "Heitzeg is remarkably prolific. His body of work includes significant orchestra and chamber pieces, opera, works for chorus and film scores. His compositions reflect a concern for environmental issues, history, art and literature." Terry Blain of the Minneapolis Star Tribune has called Heitzeg "renowned for the ecological agenda of his music, and its sense of social conscience." Heitzeg's belief in environmentalism and pacifism is a fundamental cornerstone of his work, with themes of social justice, ecology, and the interconnectedness of humans and the Earth interweaving in almost all his compositions. Heitzeg described his philosophy in a 1993 interview with the Arizona Daily Star: "To write about nature and to include natural instruments is my mission. By doing that I hope to have people realize our relationship to nature, and have them respect other lives. And when that happens, peace is more possible, be it world peace or inner peace."

He has taken direct inspiration from the natural world in works such as Makhato Wakpa (Blue Earth River), Voice of the Everglades, and Endangered (Written in Honor of All Turtles and Tortoises). Heitzeg has also been inspired by artists of many different disciplines, having devoted works to painters Georgia O'Keeffe and Salvador Dali, composer Sir Peter Maxwell Davies, poet Pablo Neruda, and others. Themes of human rights and social justice are at the forefront of works such as his Nobel Symphony, Peace March for Paul and Sheila Wellstone, and How Many Breaths? (In Memory of George Floyd and Countless Others).

His music often features natural instruments, such as stones, fallen tree branches, and sea glass shards. Heitzeg told one interviewer that he sees his use of natural materials as instruments as "a symbolic metaphor for the fact that we're all connected and not separate from nature. All instruments come from nature." He has also used other kinds of found objects as instruments to highlight thematic resonances in a particular piece, such as plowshares and olive branches in his Nobel Symphony and Ford Mustang hubcaps and horseshoes in Mustang (in Tribute to Wild Horses and Burros).

=== Ecoscores ===
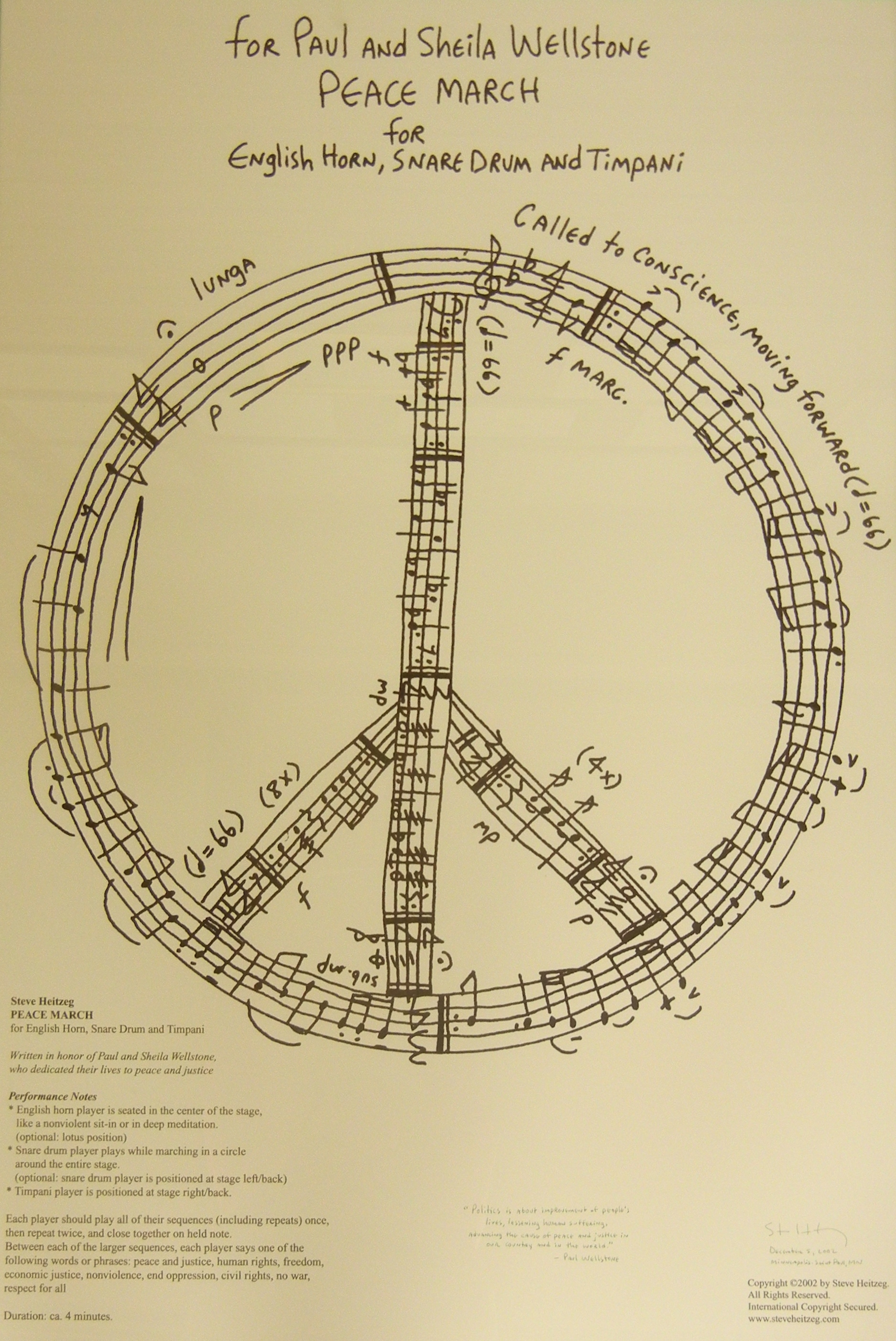
An example of one of Heitzeg's ecoscores, 2002's Peace March for Paul and Sheila Wellstone

As part of his artistic commitment to environmental issues, Heitzeg writes what he calls "ecoscores", hand-drawn graphics that combine musical notation and visual art and seek to reinforce themes of Earth and pacifism. Each ecoscore is hand-drawn on recycled paper. Two ecoscores, Peace March for Paul and Sheila Wellstone and American Symphony (Unfinished), are in the permanent collection of the Weisman Art Museum in Minneapolis. Ecology Symphony, written for the 40th anniversary of Earth Day in 2010, dedicated each of its movements to a different endangered species, including the leatherback turtle, Javan rhinoceros, and mountain gorilla.

== Critical reception ==
Heitzeg's work has been favorably reviewed by many critics. Nicholas Tawa, author of the 2009 book The Great American Symphony, singled out Heitzeg as part of "a new crop of American composers who find value in writing symphonies." Bruce Hodges of MusicWeb International called the 2004 VocalEssence performance of Heitzeg's Nobel Symphony one of the best concerts of that year, calling it "a work that continues to linger in the mind" and praising its "eloquent reimagining" of a text by Pablo Neruda. Michael Fleming of the St. Paul Pioneer Press wrote, "Heitzeg's compositions, whether for orchestra, solo instrument or voice, are colorful and superbly crafted. Behind each lies a story or idea, but the music stands by itself." Writing for the Star Tribune, Terry Blain called Heitzeg's American Nomad "an unashamedly accessible and emotional piece, packed with catchy tunes and pin-sharp evocations of both landscape and urban environments. Its teeming generosity of spirit and openness to new experiences now feel painfully at odds with our more inward-looking, mean-spirited present and seem almost to rebuke it."

== Career ==
=== 1980s and 1990s: A Marriage, On the Day You Were Born, and Aqua ===
In 1988, Heitzeg's three-movement orchestral tribute to Vice President Hubert Humphrey, A Voice Remembered, was performed by the Civic Orchestra of Minneapolis; WCCO-TV newscaster Dave Moore read from Humphrey's speeches and writing. Star Tribune classical music critic Michael Anthony called the work "neo-Romantic, emotive, heart-on-sleeve music" that "evokes the sound and idiom of Aaron Copland's work, especially in the outer movements", adding, "In its brevity and tight construction, it's an effective work."

Endangered (Written in Honor of All Turtles and Tortoises), a 10-minute work for solo cello, debuted in Minneapolis in 1990. The piece uses a repeated theme with the notes E-D-A-G, shorthand for "endangered", and was inspired by the similar shapes of a cello and Galapagos tortoise. Michael Anthony called it "an odd and touching work in nine brief movements held together by a lush, elegiac theme."

The Dale Warland Singers premiered Heitzeg's Christmas choral work little tree, based on the poem by e.e. cummings, in 1990. The company later recorded the song on its 1995 album December Stillness. Described by John Shulson of the Newport News, Virginia, Daily Press as "a charming lullaby-like work of touching imagery", little tree has become one of Heitzeg's most frequently performed works.

Two compositions by Heitzeg, Flower of the Earth and Endangered, were used as the score for the 1991 PBS American Playhouse film A Marriage: Georgia O'Keeffe and Alfred Stieglitz. Flower of the Earth was originally written in 1987 in homage to O'Keeffe, and devotes each of its four movements to a different O'Keeffe painting. Alexander, who co-produced the film, chose Heitzeg to write its score, and worked with him again repeatedly.

Heitzeg's choral work Litanies for the Living was premiered in 1992 in Minneapolis by the Westminster Festival Chorus and Minnetonka Choral Society. A meditation on peace between humans and nature, Litanies is set to text by poets Gary Snyder and Wendell Berry. Michael Anthony called it "effectively and skillfully composed" and "evocative ... with a tone of reverence and loss."

Makhato Wakpa (Blue Earth River) was premiered in 1992 by the Mankato Symphony Orchestra. The piece is inspired by the geography and history of the Blue Earth River, including the mass execution of 38 Native Americans after the Dakota War of 1862. The Arizona Daily Star called it "a work that fully integrates Heitzeg's ecological and cultural interests". It was subsequently performed by the Cabrillo Festival Orchestra, Marin Alsop conducting, in 1995.

The 1995 orchestral work Mustang (in Tribute to Wild Horses and Burros) pays tribute to the role of horses in American mythology, as well as their automotive descendants; instrumentation included Ford Mustang hubcaps and horseshoes used as percussive elements. Todd Epp of the Sioux Falls, South Dakota, Argus-Leader, reviewing a performance of the work by the South Dakota Symphony, said it "painted a vivid sound portrait of freedom, power, and the American West," and wrote that the hubcaps simultaneously served as "both a cymbal and a symbol."

In 1995, Heitzeg wrote the symphony On the Day You Were Born to accompany the bestselling children's book by Debra Frasier. The work was commissioned by the Minnesota Commissioning Club and debuted by the Minnesota Orchestra, with actress Jane Alexander as narrator, and subsequently released by the orchestra as an animated children's video on the NotesAlive! label. The Minnesota Orchestra restaged the piece with Maya Angelou as narrator in 2008. The symphony has been performed frequently by orchestras across the U.S. On the Day You Were Born won the American Library Association's Carnegie Medal for Excellence in Children's Video in 1997.

Heitzeg was commissioned in 1997 by Gustavus Adolphus College to write Blessed are the Peacemakers, a work for alto soloist, chorus, and orchestra that honored the 25th anniversary of the college's annual student-performed "Christmas in Christ Chapel" program. The work also honored five historic peacemakers: Martin Luther King, Hildegard von Bingen, St. Francis, Dag Hammarskjöld, and Raoul Wallenberg.

Heitzeg's debut album, Earthworks: Music in Honor of Nature, was released in 1998 on Innova Recordings. A collection of his chamber works, it includes performances by flutist Julia Bogorad, soprano Maria Jette, cellist Laura Sewell, the House of Hope Children's Choir, and Zeitgeist.

Aqua (Hommage a Jacques-Yves Cousteau), a tribute to the oceans and the influential French explorer and environmentalist, was debuted in 1999 by the Virginia Symphony. In 2000, the game show Jeopardy! featured Heitzeg and Aqua as the subject of a Final Jeopardy question.

=== 2000s: Death of the Dream, Voice of the Everglades, and Nobel Symphony ===
Heitzeg wrote the words and music for What the River Says, a 15-minute work for chorus, piano, and percussion in three movements, which was inspired by the 1997 Red River flood that devastated North Dakota and commissioned by the American Composers Forum and the National Endowment for the Arts. It was premiered by the Grand Forks Master Chorale in 2000. Heitzeg used stones and driftwood he gathered from the Red River banks as natural instrumentation. The title is from a poem by William Stafford.

Heitzeg's score for the PBS documentary Death of the Dream: Farmhouses in the Heartland won an Upper Midwest Emmy in 2000 from the National Academy of Television Arts and Sciences. It was performed by cellist Laura Sewell, pianist Thomas Linker, fiddle and mandolin player Peter Ostroushko, Heitzeg on guitar, and members of the new-music ensemble Zeitgeist. The score was released on disc by Innova Recordings.

Voice of the Everglades (A Tribute to Marjory Stoneman Douglas) was commissioned by Florida's Naples Philharmonic Orchestra in honor of conservationist Marjory Stoneman Douglas and premiered in 2000. To create the work, Heitzeg spent time in Florida's Everglades and Ten Thousand Islands collecting audio recordings and found objects used in the piece, including manatee vocalizations, coral, river stones, sawgrass bundles and manatee bones. The premiere was accompanied by large-scale projection of images of the Everglades by nature photographer Clyde Butcher, who also narrated excerpts from Douglas's writings. Cathy Chestnut of the Fort Myers, Florida News-Press called it "a celebration of Douglas' life and the land she fought to protect, and an elegy for the endangered manatee." The Czech Republic's Moravian Philharmonic Orchestra's recording of Voice of the Everglades was released on the label Stone Circle Music in 2005. Reviewer John Leeman of MusicWeb International called it "heartening" and likened it to "a spoken documentary set to music. You could perhaps think of it as a kind of conservationist Peter and the Wolf."

Heitzeg's 2001 Nobel Symphony celebrates the 100th anniversary of the Nobel Peace Prize and was commissioned by Gustavus Adolphus College, which hosted the 33rd annual Nobel Conference that year. The 75-minute symphony was the largest work of Heitzeg's career to that point, involving 400 musicians from the Gustavus Orchestra and five separate choirs. Each of its six movements is dedicated to a particular category of Nobel Prize—Peace, Literature, Physics, Chemistry, Medicine, and Economics—and includes writings from Nobel laureates such as Martin Luther King, Desmond Tutu, the Dalai Lama, and Rigoberta Menchú. Heitzeg again used unconventional instruments, with percussionists playing plowshares, olive branches, Tibetan singing bowls, African drums, empty soup cans (representing hunger), and hollow prosthetic legs (representing the folly of war). Kay Miller of the Minneapolis Star Tribune wrote that the work's focus on world peace took on added significance given the political circumstances at the time, with its debut performance only two weeks after the September 11 attacks.

Symphony to the Prairie Farm, a 20-minute work in four movements, was first performed in 2002 by the Des Moines Symphony. Robert C. Fuller of the Des Moines Register called it "an eclogue to Midwestern agrarianism", and praised the use of squeaky toys to mimic prairie dogs "strangely evocative and effective." Ghosts of the Grasslands, the first movement of the symphony, was performed by the Boulder Philharmonic, with Michael Butterman conducting, in 2017 at the Kennedy Center in Washington, D.C.

Heitzeg wrote Centennial Fanfare (A Common Call) in honor of the Minnesota Orchestra's 100th season in 2002.

We Are Met at Gettysburg, co-commissioned by the Minnesota Orchestra and The Philadelphia Orchestra and debuted in 2003, was jointly created with Pennsylvania composer Amy Scurria. With a title taken from Lincoln's Gettysburg Address, the work honored the 140th anniversary of the Civil War battle.

The choral concert River Journey Suite, debuted in 2004 by the Dale Warland Singers, included compositions by Heitzeg, William Banfield, Kirke Mechem, and John Muehleisen; Heitzeg's work, Elegy on Water, was inspired by Robert Bly's poem "Mourning Pablo Neruda." Bly read his poem during the performance; reviewer Michael Anthony praised the music's "whirling figures [that] coalesced into a folklike hymn at the end."

Song Without Borders, a four-part work for string quartet, was written in memory of the victims of a 2003 bombing attack on UN workers in Baghdad, and was performed by the Daedalus Quartet in 2008 at the UN Headquarters in New York to commemorate the fifth anniversary of the attack. Soon afterward, it was performed by the Iraqi National Symphony Orchestra String Quartet in Baghdad.

In 2008, the James Sewell Ballet collaborated with Heitzeg on Social Movements, a 30-minute dance piece scored by Heitzeg on the themes of war, global warming, refugees and human rights and inspired in part by the self-sacrifice of the Quaker peace activist Norman Morrison, who set himself on fire in 1965 to protest the Vietnam War. Reviewer Camille Lefevre, writing for the Star Tribune, praised the music's "sensory and historical barrage ... packed with emotional and dramatic cues."

While We Breathe, We Hope (Fanfare For Obama), which included text from President Barack Obama's victory speech after the 2008 election, was commissioned and premiered by The Chamber Music Society of Minnesota in 2009.

=== 2010s: Wild Songs, Symphony in Sculpture, and American Nomad ===
In 2011, Innova Recordings released Wild Songs, an album of compositions by Heitzeg and Lori Laitman sung by soprano Polly Butler Cornelius and Zeitgeist members Heather Barringer and Patti Cudd, as well as recorded bonobo vocalizations. It features texts by Rachel Carson, Jane Goodall, and Terry Tempest Williams. Steven Ritter of Audiophile Audition magazine called Heitzeg "a composer who is fiercely melodic and knows how to integrate disparate sounds into a whole". Dominy Clements of MusicWeb International magazine called the album "highly approachable" and praised the music as "full of fascination and variety. ... These are works which lead their own environmental consciousness-raising life with considerable communicative depth." Cheryl Coker of the Journal of the International Alliance for Women in Music called it "intriguing" and said that Cornelius was "excellent" and "consistently effective throughout her vocal range."

In 2012, the Des Moines Symphony debuted Symphony in Sculpture, a 25-minute work commissioned for the Pappajohn Sculpture Park in Des Moines and for the 75th season of the Des Moines Symphony itself. It has nine short movements, each representing one of the park's sculptures. Michael Morain of The Des Moines Register felt the piece was too short, but wrote, "the music matches the sculptures with just a few thoughtful strokes." Symphony in Sculpture II followed in 2015, covering six more sculptures and including windchimes made from chakra stones and olive branches, a steel mixing bowl from Heitzeg's late mother's kitchen, and trilobite and whalebone fossils. 2019's Symphony in Sculpture III pays tribute to three more sculptures, including one by Ai Weiwei.

In 2015, the Minnesota Orchestra premiered Heitzeg's trumpet concerto American Nomad, a work for full orchestra with instrumentation such as an armature bar from the Statue of Liberty, New York City subway spikes, a piece of steel from the Golden Gate Bridge, and fallen branches from a Joshua tree. Reviewing its debut performance, Michael Anthony called it an "intriguing" and "vividly rhythmic ... rumination on the American spirit: its loneliness, its medley of cultures, its restless ambition and grandiosity," which he felt was "so good that one is led to predict it will be performed by numerous orchestras across the country." Terry Blain, writing about a 2019 performance, praised its "exuberant, multifaceted writing for solo trumpet, laced with jazzy stylings and suffused with the irrepressible curiosity of the American spirit."

Heitzeg's composition "Earthbird" for soprano, string quintet, and piano was premiered by the Chamber Music Society of Minnesota in 2017 at Hamline University. It was also performed in 2019 at Gustavus Adolphus's Nobel Conference 55. The title is a play on Igor Stravinsky’s 1910 ballet The Firebird. Composed in honor of peace and the beauty of birds, "Earthbird" combines elements of Stravinsky and 1960s pop structures.

His chamber music work Seabirds and Stones: In Memory of Sir Peter Maxwell Davies and Refugee (Variations on Immigration) debuted together at Lakeville Area Arts Center in 2018; performers included Anna Christofaro, soprano, and Mary Jo Gothmann, piano.

=== 2020s: How Many Breaths?, Lament of the Earth, and Birdsongs and Bells ===
For violinist Ariana Kim, Heitzeg wrote the music for How Many Breaths?, an 18-minute multimedia work for solo violin and spoken word inspired by the 2020 protests in the Twin Cities against the murder of George Floyd. Kim not only performed the violin part but edited the video presentation of demonstrations and art created during the protests, with spoken text by Penumbra Theatre artistic director Sarah Bellamy. The video premiered in September 2020 on the website of the Chamber Music Society of Minnesota. Star Tribune critic Terry Blain called Heitzeg's score "jaggedly expressive."

Mount Olivet Lutheran Church commissioned Heitzeg's work for SATB chorus, "Give Us a Pure Heart", for its 100th anniversary. The Mount Olivet Choir premiered the work, which incorporates text by United Nations Secretary-General Dag Hammarskjöld, in November 2020, and performed it again for its centennial celebration in January 2023.

The Chamber Music Society of Minnesota premiered Heitzeg's "Allemansrätten (Freedom to Roam)" for string quartet in October 2021. The composition is based on the Swedish concept of Allemansrätten, or "everyone’s rights", and celebrates the right of all people to access and enjoy wilderness, as well as the collective responsibility to take care of it.

In 2022, the National Lutheran Choir, Minnesota Boychoir, and soloist Clara Osowski performed the premiere of Heitzeg's and poet Susan Palo Cherwien's Lament of the Earth. A work in four movements, Heitzeg described Lament as “part dance of life, part protest music against violence and the destruction of the earth.” Incorporating chants, dances, prayer-like elements, and Heitzeg's motif of naturally occurring percussion such as driftwood, Lament was written to explore how people of different faiths can come together in awareness of the beauty of the Earth. Cherwien's text included additional material by Tachibana Hokushi, Winona LaDuke, and Terry Tempest.

In July 2022, the Saint Paul Civic Symphony premiered "Green Hope After Black Rain (Symphony for the Survivors of Hiroshima, Nagasaki and the Manzanar Concentration Camp)". The work is a memorial to the victims of the 1945 atomic bombings of the two Japanese cities, and included percussion elements made from Hiroshima and Nagasaki trees as well as stones from the Manzanar Japanese-American concentration camp.

In July 2022, the Minnesota Orchestra debuted Heitzeg's work "Green Freedom", a companion to his 2002 piece "Blue Liberty", both commissioned by the Plymouth Civic League. "Blue Liberty" had been performed annually at the Music in Plymouth series before the COVID-19 pandemic. "Green Freedom," a meditation on the wilderness, is divided into three segments, each exploring different aspects of America and environmentalism.

In 2022 and 2023, carillonneur Chad Winterfeldt premiered Heitzeg's four-part composition Birdsongs and Bells at Gustavus Adolphus College's 58th Nobel Conference. The work was composed especially for Gustavus's digital carillon, a percussion instrument combining elements of a keyboard and bell tower. The first section, “Aequa (Equality Rings, Birds Sing),” debuted in September 2022, while the other three movements were released over the rest of the year, thematically linked to each of the seasons.

In May 2023, First Presbyterian Church in Stillwater, Minnesota, premiered Heitzeg's composition "Peace Everywhere," written for SATB chorus, flute, cello, and organ, with text derived from the Upanishads and the Bible verse John 14:27.

In January 2024, Ariana Kim premiered Heitzeg's "light/see + dark/hear" at the Minneapolis Institute of Art as part of the Great Northern Festival. The 90-minute intersensory work was inspired partly by the dark and cold of Minnesota nights. It was divided into two parts: In the first, listeners were given earplugs and asked to silently view the museum's adjoining exhibit of Gordon Parks photography; in the second, the audience was brought into a completely dark theater to listen to Kim's performance. Reviewer David Timm of Minnesota Monthly called the performance "a triumph" and said that while he thought that the attempts to close off the audiences' senses of sight and hearing were not entirely successful, he felt the attempt was thought-provoking and "a profoundly embodied experience."

Heitzeg's 2021 composition "Peace is Like a Flower" premiered in 2024 at Plymouth Congregational Church in Minneapolis, where it was performed by the church's Fire Tree Singers and youth choir with pianist Philip Brunelle.

Heitzeg's composition "Flowering Prairie (Crocus)" was performed by Philadelphia Orchestra English horn soloist Elizabeth Starr Masoudnia's 2023 album English Horn Expressions. Classical Music Daily called the piece "mostly peaceful and a little melancholy."

Heitzeg's "What if Love is the Thing?", a short composition for jazz ensemble and vocalist, was premiered in April 2024 by Macalester College Music Department's MacJazz group. A meditation on love that includes improvisational vocals exploring the word for "love" in more than two dozen languages, the piece was influenced by classic jazz albums such as John Coltrane’s A Love Supreme and Miles Davis’ All Blues, as well as Elizabeth Alexander’s poem "Praise Song for the Day." Heitzeg's daughter Zadie, who plays alto saxophone in MacJazz, also performed on the recording.

In January 2025, Heitzeg's composition Death Suite for Jackie O was premiered in St. Paul, Minnesota, as part of the Schubert Club Concert Series by mezzo-soprano Clara Osowski and pianist Casey Rafn. Heitzeg composed the song cycle with Osowski's voice in mind. It was inspired, Heitzeg said, by his admiration of "Jacqueline Kennedy Onassis' devotion to art, culture and beauty, as well as her resilience and quiet defiance in the face of violence and danger". The piece is made up of three movements. The first, featuring text from Edna St. Vincent Millay's poem "Memory of Cape Cod", is meant to evoke Kennedy's peaceful home life before John F. Kennedy's assassination. The second, "The Pink Suit ('Let Them See What They Have Done')", is named for Jackie Kennedy's iconic pink dress and her famous remark after the assassination. The third movement quotes Constantine P. Cavafy's poem "Ithaca" in Aliki Barnstone's translation, which was read at Jackie Kennedy's funeral in 1994.

In September 2025, the Minnesota Orchestra premiered Heitzeg's EcoSaga (Concerto for Three Landscapes). Continuing his frequent use of natural elements, the cello concerto also features sounds drawn from stones moved and tapped at random by a percussionist. Heitzeg dedicated EcoSaga to the orchestra's principal cellist, Anthony Ross, who performed as soloist. The concert also included another new Heitzeg cello work, Here on Native Land.

In October 2025, the Chamber Music Society of Minnesota premiered Heitzeg's Variations on Peace, written in honor of society co-director Young-Nam Kim's 80th birthday. The four-part composition was inspired by Olivier Messiaen's Quatuor pour la fin du temps. In the St. Paul Pioneer Press, critic Sheila Regan wrote that the work "pulled heavy emotional weight even as it strove toward musical beauty".

=== Other work ===
In addition to composing, Heitzeg has taught at Minnesota State University Mankato and Gustavus Adolphus College, and worked in the Minnesota Orchestra library. He was the 1993–1994 composer-in-residence at the University of Saint Thomas.

== Awards and accolades ==
- Heitzeg's score for the PBS documentary Death of the Dream: Farmhouses in the Heartland won an Upper Midwest Emmy Award in 2000 from the National Academy of Television Arts and Sciences.
- On the Day You Were Born won the American Library Association's Carnegie Medal for Excellence in Children's Video in 1997.
- Heitzeg was awarded the 2001 McKnight Composer Fellowship, as well as numerous other awards, grants and commissions from organizations including ASCAP, the American Composers Forum, Archibald Bush Foundation, Meet the Composer and the Jerome Foundation.
- Heitzeg was named Composer of the Year at the 2001 Minnesota Music Awards.
- Heitzeg received Gustavus Adolphus College's First Decade Award in 1992 and the Distinguished Alumni Citation in 1996.
- In 2020, Heitzeg and the National Lutheran Choir jointly won Chorus America and the American Composers Forum's annual Dale Warland Singers Commission Award for his Lament of the Earth.

Gustavus Adolphus College maintains an archive of materials related to Heitzeg's composing career.

== Personal life ==
Heitzeg lives in St. Paul, Minnesota, with his wife Gwen and daughter Zadie.

== Selected works ==
=== Orchestral works ===
- Nine Surrealist Studies (After Salvador Dali) (1987)
- A Voice Remembered (in Memoriam Hubert H. Humphrey) (1988)
- Makhato Wakpa (Blue Earth River) (1992)
- On the Day You Were Born (1995)
- Blessed are the Peacemakers (1997)
- Mustang (in Tribute to Wild Horses and Burros) (1998)
- Aqua (Hommage a Jacques-Yves Cousteau) (1999)
- Voice of the Everglades (A Tribute to Marjory Stoneman Douglas) (2000)
- Nobel Symphony (2001)
- Blue Liberty (2002)
- Symphony to the Prairie Farm (2002)
- We Are Met at Gettysburg (2003)
- Wounded Fields (2003)
- Madeline Island: Sanctuary in Blue (2005)
- The Tin Forest (2005)
- Together (Divided We Are Nothing…) (2007)
- While We Breathe, We Hope (Fanfare For Obama), (2009)
- Symphony in Sculpture (2012)
- Now We Start the Great Round (2014)
- Symphony in Sculpture II (2015)
- American Nomad (2015)
- Symphony in Sculpture III (2019)
- EcoSaga (Concerto for Three Landscapes) (2025)

=== Instrumental and chamber works ===
- Endangered (Written in Honor of All Turtles and Tortoises) (1990)
- Centennial Fanfare (A Common Call) (2002)
- Of Wind and Wood (2003)
- Peace March for Paul and Sheila Wellstone (2003)
- Open Spaces (2004)
- Peace Cranes (2006)
- Song Without Borders (2008)
- The Legend of the Bluebonnet (2009)
- While We Breathe, We Hope (Fanfare for Obama) (2009)
- Ecology Symphony (2010)
- Seabirds and Stones: In Memory of Sir Peter Maxwell Davies (2018)
- How Many Breaths? (In Memory of George Floyd and Countless Others) (2020)
- Here on Native Land (2025)
- Variations on Peace (2025)

=== Vocal and choral works ===
- Enduring Earth (1990)
- little tree (1990)
- Litanies for the Living (1992)
- What the River Says (2000)
- Elegy on Water (2004)
- River Journey Suite: "Mourning Pablo Neruda" (2004)
- We, Too, Rise (2006)
- I Pray to the Birds (2010)
- Long Walk To Freedom (2014)
- I Will Be a Hummingbird (2015)

=== Film, theater and ballet scores ===
- A Marriage: Georgia O'Keeffe and Alfred Stieglitz (1991)
- Inheriting the Holocaust (1994)
- Death of the Dream: Farmhouses in the Heartland (2000)
- Ghosts (2003)
- Lincoln and Lee at Antietam: The Cost of Freedom (2006)
- Social Movements (2008)

=== Songs and cycles ===
- Refugee (Variations on Immigration) (2018)

=== Discography ===
==== As primary artist ====
- On the Day You Were Born (video, Minnesota Orchestra, 1996)
- Steve Heitzeg, Earthworks (Music In Honor Of Nature), (1998, Innova Recordings)
- Steve Heitzeg, Death of the Dream: Farmhouses in the Heartland (Original Score), (2000, Innova Recordings)
- Moravian Philharmonic Orchestra, Voice of the Everglades: A Tribute to Marjory Stoneman Douglas, (2000, Stone Circle Music)
- Polly Butler Cornelius, Wild Songs: Polly Butler Cornelius performs songs by Steve Heitzeg and Lori Laitman, (2011, Innova Recordings)
- Des Moines Symphony, Steve Heitzeg, Symphony in Sculpture I, II, and III (DVD set, 2012)
- National Lutheran Choir & Minnesota Boychoir, Lament of the Earth, (2023, National Lutheran Choir)

==== Compilations and other works ====
- Dale Warland Singers, December Stillness, (1995, American Choral Catalog); features Heitzeg's little tree
- Teresa McCollough, New American Piano Music, (2001, Innova Recordings); features Heitzeg's Sandhill Crane (Migration Variations)
- Zeitgeist, Here and Now: Celebrating Thirty Years of Zeitgeist (2011, Innova Recordings); features Heitzeg's American Indian Movement (No Reservations)
- "Flowering Prairie (Crocus)" on Elizabeth Starr Masoudnia, English Horn Expressions (2023, Navona Records)
