= Nobel Conference =

Academic conference held annually at Gustavus Adolphus College

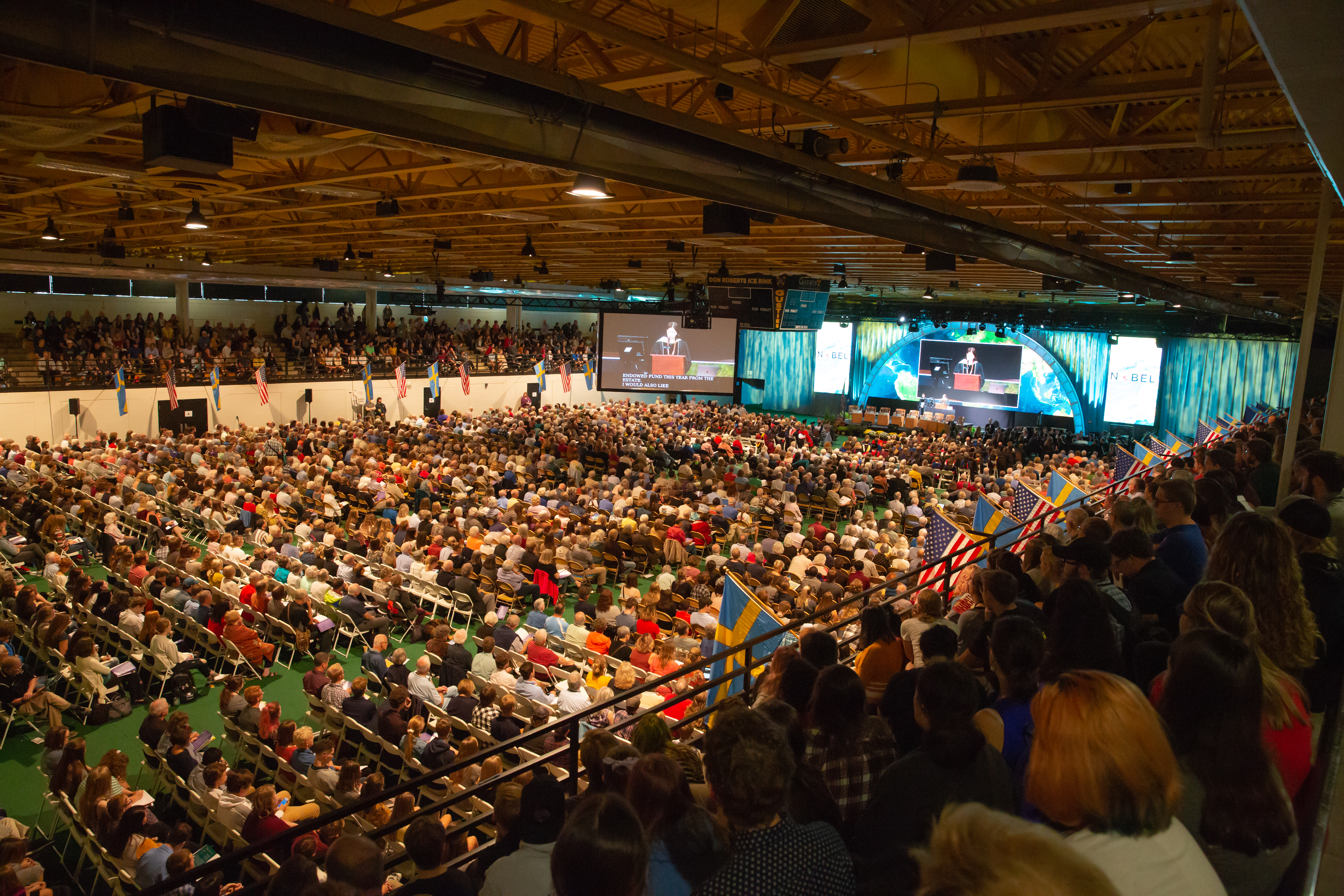
2019 Nobel Conference

The Nobel Conference is an academic conference held annually at Gustavus Adolphus College in St. Peter, Minnesota. Founded in 1963, the conference links a general audience with scientists with topics related to the natural and social sciences. The conference is open to the general public.

== History ==
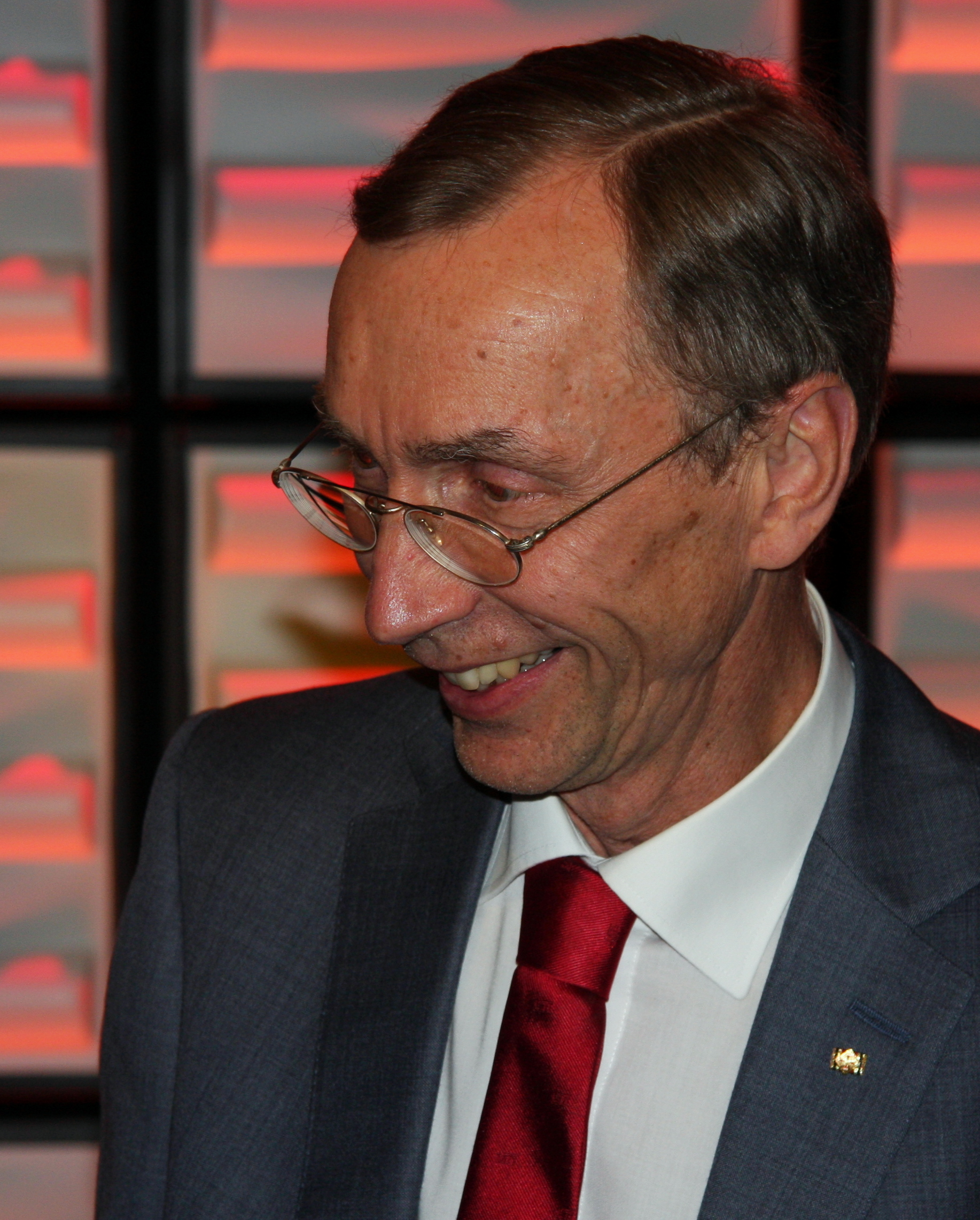
Svante Pääbo at the 2014 Conference

Gustavus Adolphus College was founded by Swedish immigrants in 1862 and throughout its history, has continued to honor its Swedish heritage. As the College prepared to build a new science hall in the early 1960s, College officials asked the Nobel Foundation for permission to name the building the Alfred Nobel Hall of Science as a memorial to the great Swedish inventor and philanthropist. Permission was granted, and the facility's dedication ceremony in 1963 included 26 Nobel laureates and officials from the Nobel Foundation.

Following the 1963 Nobel Prize ceremonies in Stockholm, College representatives met with Nobel Foundation officials, asking them to endorse an annual science conference at the College and to allow use of the Nobel name to establish credibility and high standards. At the urging of several prominent Nobel laureates, the foundation granted the request and the first conference was held at the College in January 1965.

Beginning with the help of an advisory committee composed of Nobel laureates such as Glenn Seaborg, Philip Showalter Hench, and Sir John Eccles, the conferences have been consistently successful in attracting the world's foremost authorities as speakers.

Past speakers have included David H. Hubel, Fritz Lipmann, Sir Harold Walter Kroto, and Mitchell Jay Feigenbaum.

Fifty-nine Nobel laureates have served as speakers, five of whom were awarded the Nobel prize after speaking at the Nobel conference at Gustavus.

The Nobel conference has a focus on scientific topics such as "Medicine: Prescription for Tomorrow" (2006), "The Legacy of Einstein" (2005), "The Science of Aging" (2004), "The Nature of Nurture" (2002), "Virus: The Human Connection" (1998), and "The New Shape of Matter: Materials Challenge Science" (1995). The social sciences are also well represented and many topics are interdisciplinary; focusing on economics, politics, the social sciences, and philosophy.

In 2001, Gustavus Adolphus commissioned American composer and alumnus Steve Heitzeg to compose a piece for the 100th anniversary of the Nobel Prizes. Heitzeg's 75-minute Nobel Symphony is orchestrated for mezzo-soprano, baritone, children's choir, SATB Chorus and Orchestra. The movements highlight all the major Nobel Prizes, including Literature, Chemistry, Economics, Physiology/Medicine, and Peace. It includes quotes from Nobel laureates Samuel Beckett, Pablo Neruda, Aleksandr Solzhenitsyn, Albert Camus, Toni Morrison, Amartya Sen, Paul Samuelson, Adolfo Pérez Esquivel, Mother Teresa, Bishop Desmond Tutu, Eli Wiesel, Martin Luther King, Jr., Rigoberta Menchú, Dag Hammarskjöld, the Dalai Lama, and Nelson Mandela. The Nobel Symphony premiered at the Nobel Conference on October 2, 2001, and was restaged by Philip Brunelle and VocalEssence at Orchestra Hall in Minneapolis, Minnesota on April 18, 2004.
