= Burt Hara =

American musician

Burt Hara is an American clarinetist. He was principal clarinet with the Minnesota Orchestra from 1987 until 2013. He is also the former associate principal clarinet of the Los Angeles Philharmonic.

== Life and career ==
Hara is a native of California. He received a Bachelor of Arts degree in 1984 from the Curtis Institute of Music, where his principal teachers were Donald Montanaro, Yehuda Gilad, and Mitchell Lurie.

Before coming to Minnesota, Hara served as principal clarinet of the Alabama Symphony. In 1996, Hara was appointed principal clarinet of the Philadelphia Orchestra by Wolfgang Sawallisch, but returned to Minnesota the following year. As a teacher, Hara has held positions at the University of Alabama and the University of Montevallo, and at the University of Minnesota and serves on the faculty at the Aspen Music Festival and School. Hara currently resides in Los Angeles with his family.

== Discography ==
- Dominick Argento: Capriccio for Clarinet and Orchestra (Rossini in Paris), with the Minnesota Orchestra, conducted by Eiji Oue, Reference Recordings, RR-100-CD, 2002
