= Neil Rosenshein =

American tenor (born 1947)

- Born: November 27, 1947 (age 78); New York City, New York, U.S.
- Genres: Opera, classical
- Occupations: Operatic tenor, vocal pedagogue
- Instrument: Voice

Neil Rosenshein (born November 27, 1947, in New York City) is an American operatic tenor, who sang leading tenor roles in the major American and European opera houses. He created the roles of Aspern in Dominick Argento's The Aspern Papers and Léon in Corigliano's The Ghosts of Versailles.

== Biography ==
Following studies in his native city, he made his debut as Count Almaviva in Il barbiere di Siviglia with Florida Opera in 1972. Noted particularly for his musicianship and abilities as a singing-actor, he went on to appear with the Chicago Lyric Opera, San Francisco Opera, The Royal Opera in London (Lenski in Eugene Onegin, and Števa in Jenůfa), Paris Opéra, Hamburg Opera, Dutch National Opera, Teatro alla Scala (as Narraboth in Salome in Robert Wilson's production, 1987), Santa Fe Opera, Dallas Opera (world premiere of The Aspern Papers), and the New Israeli Opera. In 1992, he appeared in Luca Ronconi's production of La damnation de Faust in Turin. He also sang with many of the great orchestras, under Leonard Bernstein, Sir Colin Davis, Seiji Ozawa, James Levine, Nikolaus Harnoncourt, and Riccardo Muti.

Rosenshein made his debut with the Metropolitan Opera in 1987, as Alfredo Germont in La traviata, opposite Diana Soviero and Sherrill Milnes, conducted by Thomas Fulton. He was also seen there in Die Fledermaus (as Alfred, conducted by Julius Rudel), Salome (as Narraboth), Werther, Faust (with Soviero and James Morris, later Samuel Ramey), the world premiere of The Ghosts of Versailles (with Teresa Stratas, Gino Quilico, and Marilyn Horne), La traviata (conducted by Plácido Domingo), Rusalka (as the Prince), Peter Grimes (conducted by James Conlon), and Die Fledermaus (now as Eisenstein), which was his last performance with the company, in 1999.

Rosenshein's recordings include Bernstein's Songfest, Haydn's Die Schöpfung, and Tchaikovsky's Eugene Onegin (with Dame Kiri Te Kanawa and Thomas Hampson, with Nicolai Gedda as M. Triquet, conducted by Sir Charles Mackerras, 1992). As of 1997, he is on the voice faculty of the Manhattan School of Music. He previously served on the faculty at DePaul University.

== Videography ==
- Verdi: La traviata [as Gastone] (Sills, H. Price, Fredricks; Rudel, Capobianco, 1976, San Diego Opera, live)
- Offenbach: La Périchole [as Piquillo] (Ewing, Bacquier, Martinelli, Cassinelli; Soustrout, Savary, 1982) [live]
- Stravinsky: Oedipus rex (Palmer; Haitink, Wich, 1984) [live]
- Corigliano: The Ghosts of Versailles [as Léon] (Stratas, Horne, Hagegård, G. Quilico; Levine, Graham, 1992) [live]
