= The Aspern Papers (opera) =

Opera by Dominick Argento

The Aspern Papers is a 1987 opera in two acts with music and libretto by Dominick Argento, commissioned by The Dallas Opera. It is based on the novella The Aspern Papers by Henry James. The opera premiered on November 19, 1988, in Dallas with a cast including Elisabeth Söderström, Frederica von Stade, and Richard Stilwell, conducted by Nicola Rescigno. The premiere was telecast in the United States on Great Performances on PBS.

== Roles ==
| Role | Voice type | Premiere cast, November 19, 1988 (Conductor: Philip Brunelle) | 25th anniversary cast, April 12, 2013 (Conductor: Graeme Jenkins) |
|---|---|---|---|
| Juliana Bordereau, an opera singer | soprano | Elisabeth Söderström | Alexandra Deshorties |
| Aspern, a composer | tenor | Neil Rosenshein | Joseph Kaiser |
| Barelli, an impresario | bass-baritone | Eric Halfvarson | Dean Peterson |
| Sonia, a singer; Barelli's mistress | mezzo-soprano | Katherine Ciesinski | Sasha Cooke |
| Tina, Juliana's niece | mezzo-soprano | Frederica von Stade | Susan Graham |
| The Lodger, a critic and biographer | baritone | Richard Stilwell | Nathan Gunn |
| Pasquale, The Lodger's servant & gardener/Painter | bass | John Calvin West | Mark McCrory/Eric Jordan |
| Olimpia, maid (also off-stage voice of Juliana in Prologue I) | soprano | Joan Gibbons | Jennifer Youngs |

== Synopsis ==
Argento's opera makes numerous changes in the characters, plot and setting of Henry James' novella. For instance: Aspern is a composer, not a poet; Juliana, an opera singer; the locale is changed from Venice to Lake Como.

Juliana Bordereau, a former prima donna and the mistress of the deceased composer Jeffrey Aspern, is living with her spinster niece Tina in a villa on the edge of Lake Como. A stranger appears, requesting that the women rent him rooms. The Lodger is a scholar and biographer of Aspern, and believes that Juliana may possess papers and memorabilia of the composer, including possibly the score of an operatic masterpiece based on Medea that Aspern wrote for Juliana shortly before his death fifty years earlier (and believed to be lost). The action alternates between two time periods: 1885, when the Lodger is attempting to discover whether the papers exist at the villa, and 1835, where the audience sees the young Juliana and Aspern, learns about the relationship between Aspern and a younger soprano, Sonia, and the death of Aspern. Returning to 1885, the Lodger has learned that the Juliana still possesses Aspern's papers. Juliana dies, and Tina suggests that the Lodger may have the Medea score if he will marry her. He rejects her offer and plans to leave the next day. In the morning, he tells Tina that he has changed his mind and must have the score. She tells him it is too late, and he departs. Later, alone in her music room, Tina drops the score of the opera – page by page – into a fire.

== Subsequent productions ==
The Aspern Papers was performed by the Washington Opera (1990), in which Katherine Ciesinski, who had portrayed Sonia in the 1988 premiere, assumed the role of Tina, with Robert Orth (The Lodger), David Kuebler (Aspern), Pamela South (Juliana), Eric Halfvarson (reprising his premiere performance as Barelli) and Susan Graham (Sonia). Following a similar pattern, when The Dallas Opera mounted a 25th anniversary production in April 2013, Ms. Graham transitioned from the role of Sonia to Tina, alongside Nathan Gunn (The Lodger), Alexandra Deshorties (Juliana), Joseph Kaiser (Aspern), and Sasha Cooke (Sonia).

Other productions include: June 1990, Staatstheater Kassel, Germany; January 1991 The Minnesota Opera; February 1992, Royal Swedish Opera; July 1996 by the Adler Fellows of the San Francisco Opera Center; June 1998 at the Guildhall School Theatre in London (UK premiere).
