= Casa Guidi (album) =

- Reference Recordings CD, RR-100-CD

Studio album by Frederica von Stade
- Released: 2002
- Genre: Contemporary classical
- Length: 78:25
- Language: English
- Label: Reference Recordings
- Producers: J. Tamblyn Henderson, Jr

Casa Guidi: Frederica von Stade Sings Dominick Argento is a 78-minute studio album of contemporary classical music performed by von Stade, Burt Hara and the Minnesota Orchestra under the direction of Eiji Oue. It was released in 2002.

== Background ==
The album contains premiere recordings of three works by Dominick Argento, the Minnesota Orchestra's Composer Laureate.

Casa Guidi was composed in response to a request from the Minnesota Orchestra to write a work for Frederica von Stade to perform with them. Argento chose Elizabeth Barrett Browning's letters as a suitable text after happening upon her home while visiting Florence. (Von Stade had suggested that he might set something by Robert Frost, a favourite poet of hers, but he preferred working with prose rather than verse because of the greater freedom that it afforded him.) The song cycle is scored for a mezzo-soprano and a large orchestra, comprising triple woodwinds, three trumpets, four horns, three trombones, a tuba, strings and a large percussion section, as well as a mandolin, a harp, a piano and chimes playing offstage. It was first performed by von Stade and the Minnesota Orchestra under the direction of Sir Neville Marriner in Minneapolis on 28 September 1983, with repeat performances in Carnegie Hall later in the same season and in Minneapolis in 1996.

Capriccio for Clarinet and Orchestra was commissioned by the Saint Louis Symphony Orchestra for their principal clarinetist, George Silfies, and was first performed by them under the direction of Leonard Slatkin in the Powell Symphony Hall, Saint Louis on 16 May 1986.. Its first Minneapolis performance was by Joseph Longo and the Minnesota Orchestra, again under Slatkin, on 17 July 1986.

In Praise of Music was commissioned by the Minnesota Orchestra to commemorate the seventy-fifth anniversary of the orchestra's founding, and was first performed by them under the direction of Stanislaw Skrowaczewski in Minneapolis on 23 and 24 September 1977.

== Recording ==
The album was recorded digitally on 29 and 31 May 2001 (tracks 1–5) and on 1 and 2 May 2002 (tracks 6–15). The engineers used studio reference monitor loudspeakers designed by Neil Patel and Keith O. Johnson, and built by Avalon Acoustics of Boulder, Colorado.

== Cover art ==
The cover of the album, designed under the art direction of Bill Roarty of JTH, features a photograph of von Stade taken by Marcia Lieberman.

== Critical reception ==
=== Reviews ===
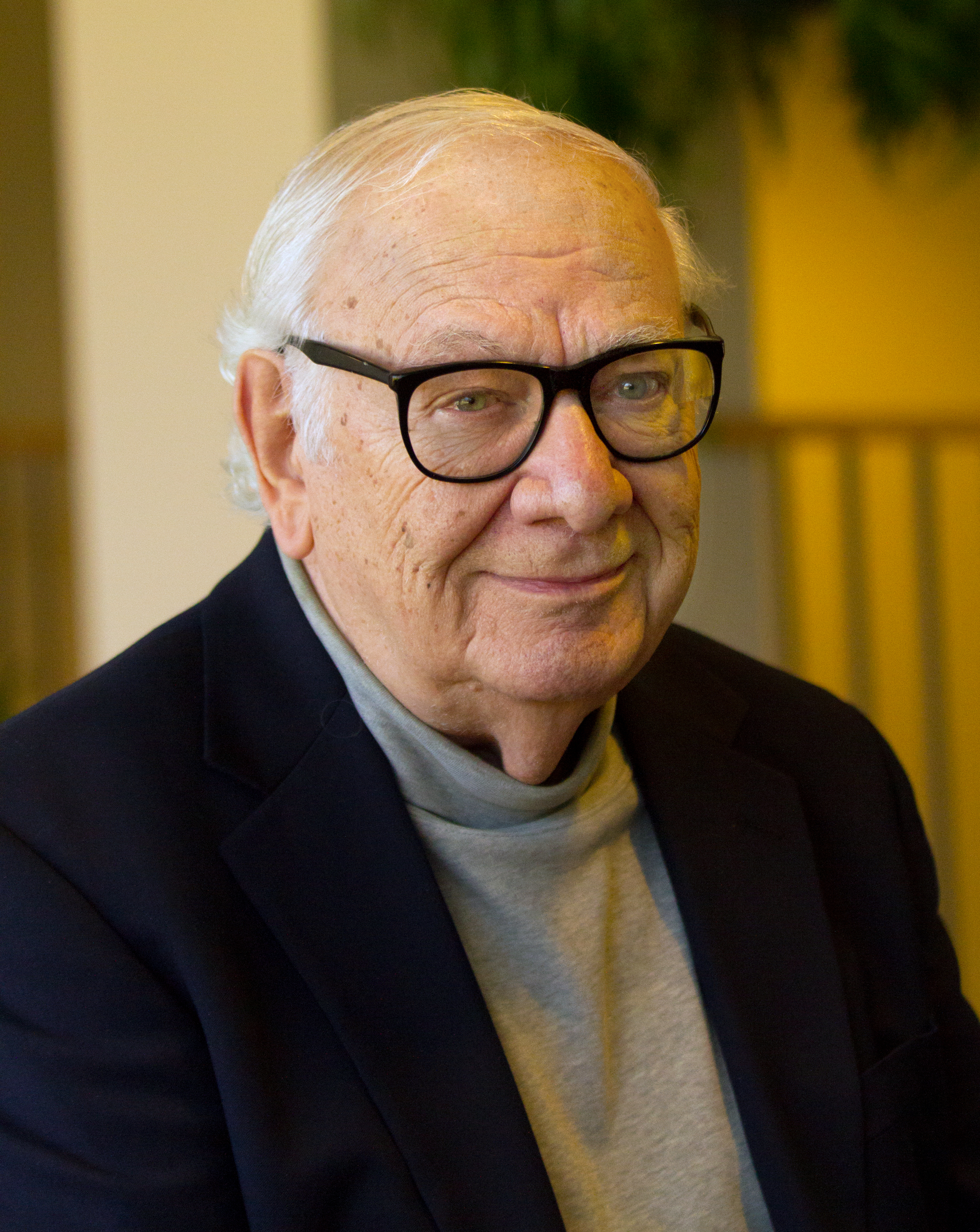
Dominick Argento, photographed by King Elder in 2016

Joseph Stevenson reviewed the album in Classics Today. In 1983, he wrote, the English conductor Neville Marriner had urged the Minnesota Orchestra to commission Dominick Argento to compose a song cycle for the operatic mezzo-soprano Frederica von Stade. Argento, who found prose more sympathetic to his idiom than verse, had decided to set excerpts from the letters that the English poet Elizabeth Barrett Browning had written to her sister while living a blissful life with her husband, the poet Robert Browning, in an apartment in Casa Guidi, a house in Florence, Italy. Von Stade had sung the cycle so often - if usually with piano or chamber group accompaniment rather than in the orchestral version of its first edition - that she "virtually becomes Elizabeth when she sings it". Her performance on the album had a good claim to be definitive, "capturing a supreme vocal artist near her peak in her most characteristic repertoire". Her voice remained almost what it had been when she made her first records in the early 1970s.

In Praise of Music was also the fruit of a commission by the Minnesota Orchestra, in this case to celebrate the seventy-fifth anniversary of its formation. In crafting his suite, Argento had taken themes from a range of different cultures and from a range of different periods in history. "The result is dazzlingly diverse as it moves from Japanese court music to Tunisian street music (and other equally unlikely juxtapositions) seemingly without effort".

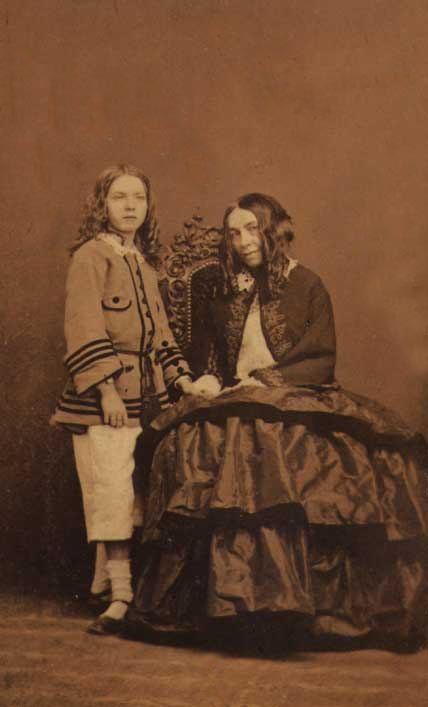
Elizabeth Barrett Browning with her son Pen in 1860

The album's other work, Capriccio for Clarinet and Orchestra, was commissioned by the Saint Louis Symphony Orchestra. In truth, it was a clarinet concerto, but Argento was so in awe of Mozart's concerto for the instrument, its slow movement in particular, that he preferred not to give his piece a name that might invite comparisons with it. Argento had subtitled his work "Rossini in Paris" because it was partly inspired by Gioachino Rossini's Péchés de vieillesse ("Sins of old age"). Argento's music did not appropriate any of Rossini's melodies, but responded to the general feeling of what he had written. The Capriccio was light of heart but not light in substance - it was a "virtuosic, full-scale" work, and its slow movement and Mozart's could be spoken of in the same breath. Burt Hara's performance as the soloist was "exciting and good-humoured".

All in all, the album scored ten out of ten, and its engineering was as impressive as its music. Reference Recordings' HDCD represented "the state of the art in standard CD production", and actually sounded better than most Super Audio CDs. It was highly recommended.

Anthony Burton reviewed the album in BBC Music Magazine. Casa Guidi, he wrote, reflected the glowing contentment of the life that Elizabeth Barrett Browning had enjoyed with her husband during their years in Florence. Frederica von Stade's performance of the cycle did not find her in quite as fresh a vocal condition as when she had premiered it eighteen years previously, but she was as easy to like as ever, and she delivered the "highly singable" music that Argento had composed for her "with great authority".

The Capriccio for Clarinet and Orchestra was "essentially light music blown up to concerto length", but its gentle last bars worked well, and Burt Hara was a fluent soloist. In Praise of Music developed tunes from various places and times into "a sequence of 'songs for orchestra' of Respighi-like brilliance". The Minnesota Orchestra was "magnificent" throughout. Reference Recordings' engineers has created a "broad yet detailed sound-picture", although some listeners would find the gulf between the album's quietest and loudest passages too extreme for domestic comfort.

=== Accolades ===
The album won the Grammy Award for Best Contemporary Classical Composition of 2003, and was nominated for a Grammy for the year's best classical vocal solo performance.

== CD track listing ==
Dominick Argento (1927–2019)

Casa Guidi: Five Songs for Mezzo-soprano and Orchestra: Letters of Elizabeth Barrett Browning to her Sister, with texts adapted by Argento (Minneapolis, 1983)

- 1 (4:15) "Casa Guidi"
- 2 (3:36) "The Italian cook and the English maid"
- 3 (6:09) "Robert Browning"
- 4 (2:47) "The death of Mr Barrett"
- 5 (5:01) "Domesticity"

Capriccio for Clarinet and Orchestra: Rossini in Paris (Saint Louis, 1986)

- 6 (7:27) "Une réjouissance"
- 7 (6:37) "Une caresse à ma femme"
- 8 (9:23) "Un petit train du plaisir"

In Praise of Music: Seven Songs for Orchestra (Minneapolis, 1977)

- 9 (5:27) "For the healer, David", lento solenne
- 10 (3:04) "For the god, Apollo", deciso e mosso
- 11 (5:56) "For the satyr, Pan", quasi cadenza
- 12 (4:58) "For the sorrower, Orpheus", tempo rubato e rapsodico
- 13 (4:24) "For the angel, Israfel", allegro e gioioso
- 14 (4:31) "For the saint, Cecilia", adagio e sereno
- 15 (4:37) "For the child, Mozart", largo cantabile

== Personnel ==
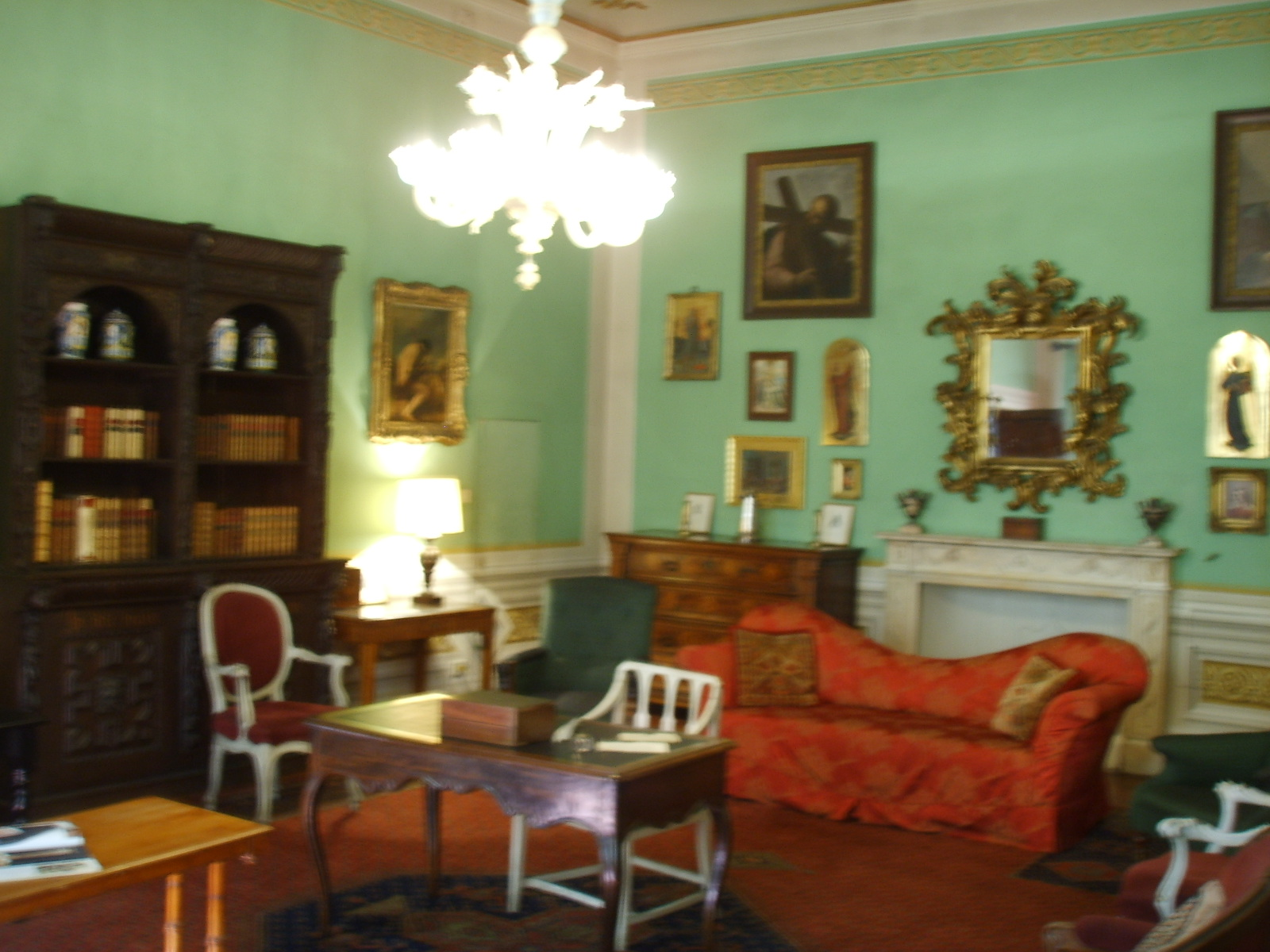
The drawing room of Casa Guidi, now a museum

=== Musical ===
- Frederica von Stade (b. 1945), mezzo-soprano (tracks 1–5)
- Burt Hara, clarinet (tracks 6–8)
- Minnesota Orchestra
- Eiji Oue (b. 1956), conductor

=== Other ===
- J. Tamblyn Henderson Jr, producer
- Giancarlo Guerrero, associate producer
- Marcia Martin, executive producer
- Keith O. Johnson, recording engineer
- Paul Stubblebine, editing and mastering engineer

== Release history ==
Reference Records released the album on CD in 2002 (catalogue number RR-100-CD), with a 20-page booklet including photographs and biographies of Argento, von Stade and Hara, the texts of the songs and notes on the music by Mary Ann Feldman. The booklet did not offer any translations.
