= Ithaca (poem) =

1911 poem by Constantine P. Cavafy

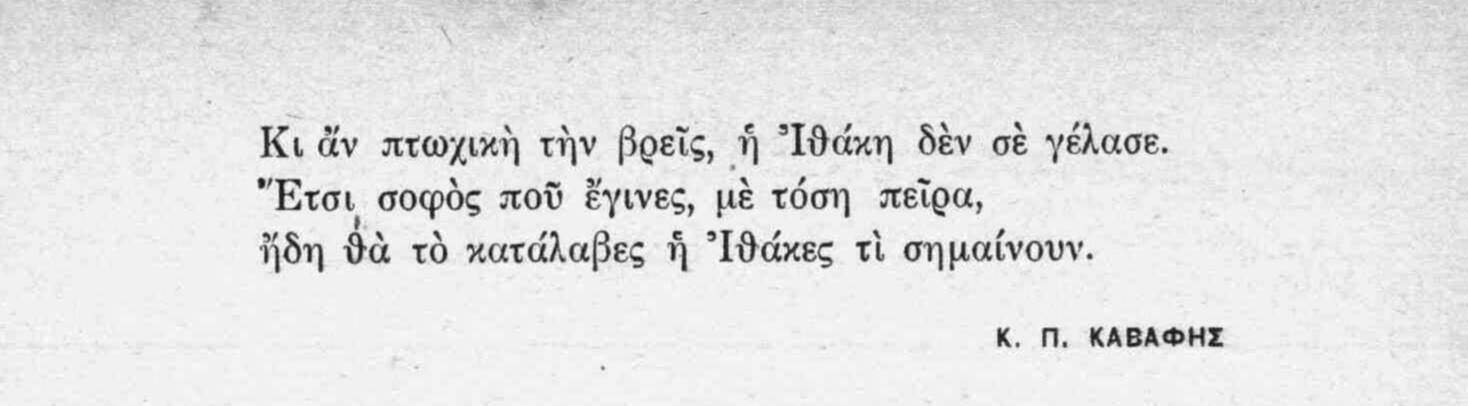
Final lines of Cavafy's Ithaca from its first publication in the journal Grammata of Alexandria (1911).

"Ithaca" (Greek: Ιθάκη) is a 1911 poem by Greek poet Constantine P. Cavafy that is commonly considered his most popular work. It was first published in the journal Grammata (Γράμματα, "letters") of Alexandria. Based on the homeward journey of Odysseus in Homer's Odyssey, the poem is titled after its namesake island of Ithaca. It is classified as a didactic-philosophical poem, stressing the importance of the journey over the destination. An early version of the poem was written in 1894 titled "A Second Odyssey". Ithaca gained a global audience upon its 1994 reading at the funeral of former first lady of the United States Jacqueline Kennedy Onassis.

== Story ==
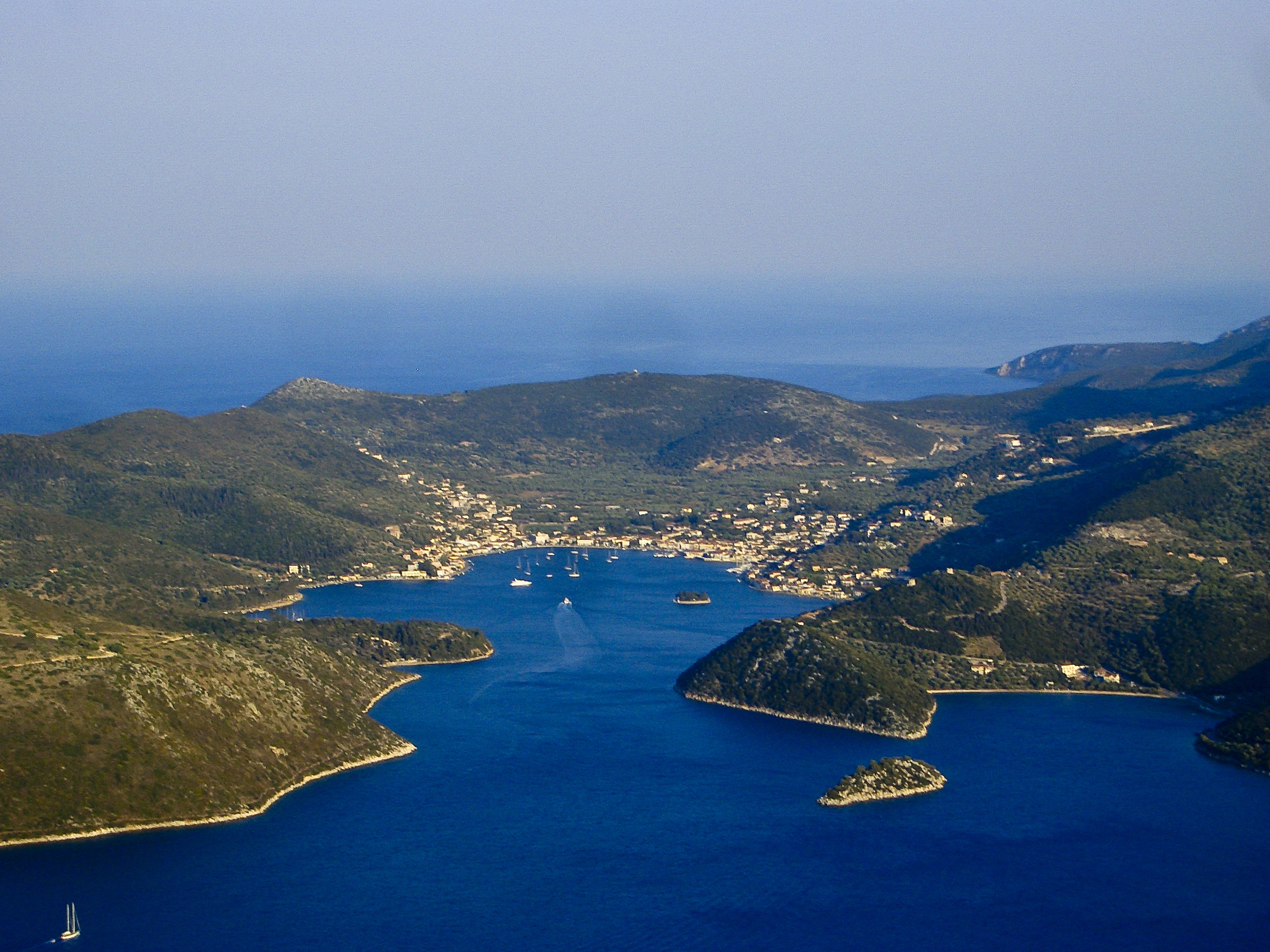
Vathy, capital of the Ionian island of Ithaca.

"Ithaca" loosely follows the journey of Odysseus in Homer's Odyssey. Cavafy wrote an early version of the poem in 1894, titled "A Second Odyssey". He revised the poem into its final state in October 1910.

"Ithaca" was published in November 1911. It was included as the ninth of forty poems in Cavafy's Poems 1905–1915. Cavafy had written a number of poems inspired by traditional works of ancient Greek literature in his early years as a poet, but by 1903 had largely shifted his focus to more obscure elements of Ancient Greek history, including far-flung outposts such as in Persia. Poems based on Homer's works were the only ones influenced by traditional classic Greek works that he included in his Poems 1905–1915. He based several poems on Homer's Iliad, but "Ithaca" is the only one he drew from the Odyssey.

The poem describes Odysseus's journey home after the end of the Trojan War. Cavafy describes Odysseus seeing amazing things, without clearly caring for the destination, as he is advised: "don't hurry your trip in any way". According to the poem, experiences gained along the way will prepare its subject for the final destination: "As wise as you will have become, with so much experience, / you will understand, by then, these Ithacas; what they mean."

=== Excerpt ===
Original Greek (polytonic)

Σὰ βγεῖς στὸν πηγαιμὸ γιὰ τὴν Ἰθάκη,
νὰ εὔχεσαι νἆναι μακρὺς ὁ δρόμος,
γεμάτος περιπέτειες, γεμάτος γνώσεις.
Τοὺς Λαιστρυγόνας καὶ τοὺς Κύκλωπας,
τὸν θυμωμένο Ποσειδῶνα μὴ φοβᾶσαι

Transliteration

Sa vgeis ston pigaimó gia tin Itháki,
na éfchesai nánai makrýs o drómos,
gemátos peripéteies, gemátos gnóseis.
Tous Laistrygónas kai tous Kýklopas,
to thymoméno Poseidóna mi fovásai

English Translation

When you depart for Ithaca,
wish for the road to be a long one,
full of adventure, full of knowledge.
Fear not the Laestrygonians and the Cyclopes,
nor the angry Poseidon.

=== Translations ===
The poem's title is also spelled as "Ithaka" in several translations, including that of Keeley and Sherrard in 1975.

== Symbolism ==
Many of Cavafy's poems consist of various symbols used as a teaching tool by the poet. They are usually lessons that either the poet himself has experienced or moments in our lives that the poet does not want us to regret and miss out on.

- “The Laestrygonians and the Cyclops, the fierce Poseidon…” - this could symbolise our inner phobias and worries which frighten as well as prevent us from progressing in life.
- Ithaca, itself, is the symbol of the Homeric journey which every person experiences in their lives. This island is the symbol of experience, wisdom and knowledge that everyone is searching for in life.
- The “Phoenician markets” and “Egyptian cities” imply the various destinations and checkpoints one encounters upon their journey before advancing onto the next stage in one's life.
- Finally, the complete lack of any reference to Odysseus plays an important symbolic role, which transforms Ithaca from the destination of the journey in the Homeric Odysseus into the destination of every reader. It is a message from Cavafy himself, to make the journey of life, without holding back.

=== Mechanisms ===
Cavafy uses repetition for emphasis in this poem. He repeats the way in which he wishes the journey for Ithaca to be long and full of wonders. He mentions his desire for a long journey at both the beginning of the poem and at the beginning of the second stanza.

== Reception ==
"Ithaca" is Cavafy's best known poem. Scholar Daniel Mendelsohn attributes the poem's enduring popularity to its focus on the journey over the destination. He writes that the destination described in "Ithaca" is death, and emphasizing the activity of life without considering the end resonated in American popular culture. According to Mendelsohn, the poem's relatively sentimental theme, considered uncharacteristic of Cavafy's works, has resulted in some of his literary critics considering the poem to be overrated. Cavafy, despite being known for "purging" his poetry of "cheaply sentimental" works, chose to include the poem prominently in several of his poetry collections, including Poems 1905–1915. Mendelsohn analyzes the placement of the poem in that collection as signaling a shift in its mood from "pessimism to optimism, from death to life". He concludes that the poem functions as a "gateway" to Cavafy's broader work in the collection.

Kaprē-Karka describes "Ithaca" as the "brain" of Cavafy's opus.

== Legacy ==
The poem was read by Maurice Tempelsman at Jacqueline Kennedy Onassis's funeral on May 23, 1994. In his reading, Tempelsman included two of his own verses. Scholar Peter Jeffreys describes this widely watched moment as presenting Cavafy's work to "a global audience that he could never have imagined". The reading inspired an increase in sales of Cavafy's poetry, making him a bestseller for a time that year.

Composer Steve Heitzeg's Death Suite for Jackie O includes text from "Ithaca" (in Aliki Barnstone's translation) in its third movement.

== Bibliography ==
- Mendelsohn, Daniel (2022). "Cavafy's Homer". Hudson Review. 74 (4): 611–626.
- Jeffreys, Peter (2015). Reframing decadence: C.P. Cavafy's imaginary portraits. Cornell University Press. ISBN 978-0-8014-4708-2.
- Kaprē-Karka, K. (1982). Love and the symbolic journey in the poetry of Cavafy, Eliot, and Seferis: an interpretation with detailed poem-by-poem analysis. Pella. ISBN 978-0-918618-21-4.
