= Patricia Misslin =

American voice teacher and soprano (1940–2021)

Patricia Misslin (May 6, 1940 – December 8, 2021) was an American voice teacher and soprano. She taught voice on the faculties of several American institutions, including the Crane School of Music at the State University of New York at Potsdam, the Manhattan School of Music, and the New England Conservatory. Several of her pupils had prominent careers in the field of opera, including Renée Fleming, Margaret Lattimore, Stephanie Blythe, and Alexandra Deshorties.

== Life and career ==
Born in Fitchburg, Massachusetts, Misslin was the daughter of Harold and Helvi Misslin. She studied at the Boston University College of Fine Arts (BUCFA) where she earned a Bachelor of Music in 1962 and a Master of Music in 1964. At Boston University she studied voice with Polyna Stoska in undergraduate school, but later expressed ambivalence toward her studies with any voice teacher. In a 2008 interview, Misslin stated of her voice teachers, "They got me in more trouble than they helped me. Because my voice was better than the people I was studying with. It was more powerful; it was more in tune." Due to frustrations with her initial graduate voice studies at BU, she dropped out of the program briefly after being accepted into Harvard Medical School; only returning to the program after the dean of the BUCFA allowed her to pursue studies in general musicianship with the pianist and conductor Ludwig Bergman rather than continue with a voice teacher. Bergman mentored Misslin in broader musical skills rather than vocal technique or singing skills, and she considered him to be the teacher who most profoundly impacted her musical development and approach to teaching students. Her other teachers included Anna Hamlin, Fausto Cleva, and Felix Wolfes.

After graduating from Boston University, Misslin worked as a soprano; appearing in oratorios and in performances of other concert repertoire rather than in operas. She performed as a soprano soloist in concerts at several prominent venues, including Alice Tully Hall, Merkin Hall, The Town Hall, and Symphony Hall, Boston. She performed with the New York Chamber Music Artists, and Canticum Novum Singers. Ms. Misslin also co-founded both Music Theatre North and the Institute of American Studies.

In 1966 Misslin joined the undergraduate voice faculty at the Crane School of Music of the State University of New York at Potsdam. She remained at that institution for the next 29 years where she taught several singers who later achieved fame; among them sopranos Renée Fleming and Alexandra Deshorties, and mezzo-sopranos Stephanie Blythe and Margaret Lattimore. In 1995 she left the Crane School of Music to join the graduate school voice faculty at the Manhattan School of Music. She later joined the voice faculties of the Bard College Conservatory of Music, and the New England Conservatory of Music in Boston, Massachusetts. She joined the faculty of the latter institution in 2003 in what The Boston Globe described as a strategic hire by the conservatory to attract top students. During her summers, she taught at the Bel Canto Institute in Florence, Italy.

Misslin died on December 8, 2021, at Northern Westchester Hospital in Mount Kisco, New York. She was 81.

== Bibliography ==
- Boddie, Susan (2021). Vocal Consistency and Artistic Freedom: Existentialism and Vocal Instruction in Higher Education. Common Ground Research Networks. ISBN 9781863352406.
- Dufault, Jenny Elizabeth (2008). Three exemplary voice teachers: David Adams, Stephen King, & Patricia Misslin; their philosophies & studio techniques (PhD). University of Minnesota Press.
- Kandell, Leslie (April 2002). "The Misslin Guide". Opera News. 66 (10): 10-11.
- Salazar, Francisco (January 7, 2022). "Obituary: Renowned Teacher Patricia Misslin Dies at 81". Opera Wire.
- Smith, Dinitia (October 9, 2003). "A Mezzo Poised for the Heights". The New York Times. p. 3.
