= Alexandra Deshorties =

French-Canadian soprano

Alexandra Deshorties (born 1975) is a French-Canadian soprano who sings principally opera. She was born in Montreal and raised in Marseille, France, where she attended the Conservatory and "where she earned a gold medal/first prize for her performance in vocal juries." She continued her education at the Manhattan School of Music where she was a pupil of Patricia Misslin.

A winner of the Metropolitan Opera Council Auditions (and a participant in the National Council Winners Concert on 2 March 1997) at 21, she entered the Metropolitan Opera's Lindemann Young Artist program the following season and made her debut with the company as the High Priestess in Aida on 30 October 1999. She has since appeared in a large number of roles both with the Met (where she sang Elettra (Idomeneo), Konstanze (Die Entführung aus dem Serail), The Countess (The Marriage of Figaro), and Fiordiligi (Così fan tutte) and with other companies throughout the world.

== Principal roles and opera companies ==
For the Dallas Opera, she has sung the roles of Desdemona in Otello in October 2009 as well as that of Juliana Bordereau in Argento's The Aspern Papers in April 2013. As Fiordiligi and as Cleopatra in Giulio Cesare, she appeared at the Seattle Opera.

Other roles include the First Lady (Die Zauberflöte); Anna (Nabucco); Musetta (La bohème); Echo (Ariadne auf Naxos); Tytania (A Midsummer Night's Dream); Elizabeth I of England (Roberto Devereux) for Welsh National Opera in October/November 2013

Deshorties has appeared at the Festival d'Aix-en-Provence; the Théâtre des Champs-Élysées in Paris, France; the Salzburg Festival; the San Francisco Opera; the Houston Grand Opera; the Brooklyn Academy of Music; the Gran Teatre del Liceu, Barcelona; the A Coruña Festival, Spain; the Gstaad Festival; the Theater an der Wien (Elisabetta in Elisabetta, regina d'Inghilterra).
