= From the Diary of Virginia Woolf =

1974 song cycle by Dominick Argento

From the Diary of Virginia Woolf is an eight-part song cycle written by Dominick Argento in 1974 for the English mezzo-soprano Janet Baker. The work won the Pulitzer Prize for Music in 1975.

The text of the songs comes from A Writer's Diary: Being Extracts from the Diary of Virginia Woolf, which was published in 1954. (The five-volume diaries edited by Anne Olivier Bell were not published until 1979.)

The choice of a prose, rather than poetic, source for a text is a common theme for Argento, who did the same thing in his cycles Letters from Composers, The Andrée Expedition, and Casa Guidi. In each case, he captures the cadence and flow of these more free-form writings without sacrificing musical structure or melodic interest. The composer's original intention was to use excerpts from Woolf's novel The Waves as the basis for his cycle. But in reading her newly published diaries he discovered a source much richer in musical and expressive possibilities. The highly confessional diary texts illuminate Woolf's inner world in a more immediate way than do her literary works.

== Movements ==
1. The Diary
2. Anxiety
3. Fancy
4. Hardy's Funeral
5. Rome
6. War
7. Parents
8. Last Entry

Assertion

Assertion

== Recordings ==
- From the Diary of Virginia Woolf
- Argento: From the Diary of Virginia Woolf / Benson: Songs for the End of the World
- D. Argento: From the Diary of Virginia Woolf

Score available from Dominick Argento - From The Diary of Virginia Woolf (Medium Voice & Piano)
