= Eiji Oue =

Japanese conductor (born 1956)

- Born: October 3, 1956 (age 70); Hiroshima, Japan
- Other name: 大植 英次
- Education: Toho Gakuen School of Music
- Occupation: conductor

Eiji Oue (大植 英次, Ōue Eiji; born October 3, 1956, in Hiroshima, Japan) is a Japanese conductor.

== Biography ==
Oue began his conducting studies with Hideo Saito of the Toho Gakuen School of Music. In 1978, Seiji Ozawa invited him to spend the summer studying at the Tanglewood Music Center. There he met Leonard Bernstein, who became a mentor. Oue won the Tanglewood Koussevitzky Prize in 1980. He also studied under Bernstein as a conducting fellow at the Los Angeles Philharmonic Institute.

Oue became music director of the Greater Boston Youth Symphony Orchestras in 1982, a post he held until 1989. He was music director of the Erie Philharmonic from 1990 to 1995. He has also served as associate conductor of the Buffalo Philharmonic Orchestra. From 1995 to 2002, he was music director of the Minnesota Orchestra. During his Minnesota tenure, the orchestra saw its attendance decline from 84% to 69% in capacity. He presided over the orchestra's first tours to Europe and Japan. He also made recordings with Minnesota, most on the Reference Records label. Oue served as music director of the Grand Teton Music Festival in Wyoming from 1997 to 2003.

After a 1997 tour with the NDR Radiophilharmonie Hanover, Oue was appointed its principal conductor in September 1998. In 2003, he was appointed principal conductor of the Osaka Philharmonic Orchestra. Oue made his debut at the Bayreuth Festival in 2005, conducting Tristan und Isolde. He became music director of the Orquestra Simfònica de Barcelona in September 2006, stepping down in 2010.

Oue's commercial recordings include Niccolò Paganini’s Violin Concerto No. 1 and Louis Spohr’s Violin Concerto No. 8 with the Swedish Radio Symphony Orchestra and Hilary Hahn for Deutsche Grammophon.

He has been professor of conducting at the Musikhochschule Hannover since 2000.

== Awards ==
- 2006 Osaka Culture Prize Special Arts Prize

== Selected discography ==
- Dominick Argento: Casa Guidi, Capriccio for Clarinet and Orchestra and In Praise of Music, with Frederica von Stade, Burt Hara and the Minnesota Orchestra, Reference Recordings, 2002

Cultural offices
| Preceded by Ling Tung | Music Director, Grand Teton Music Festival; 1997–2003 | Succeeded by Donald Runnicles |
| Preceded by Takashi Asahina | Music Director, Osaka Philharmonic Orchestra; 2003–2014 | Succeeded by Michiyoshi Inoue |
| Preceded by Ernest Martínez-Izquierdo | Orquestra Simfònica de Barcelona i Nacional de Catalunya; 2006–2010 | Succeeded by Pablo González |
