= Amy Scurria =

American composer (born 1973)

Amy Scurria (born September 24, 1973) is an American composer.

== Biography ==
Amy Scurria was born into a military family and showed an early interest in music, memorizing the piano assignments of her sister Jackie. At age 11 she took lessons under the Suzuki method and began composing. Scurria graduated from Rice University in Houston, Texas, in 1995 with a bachelor's degree in composition. In 1998, she received a master's degree in composition from Johns Hopkins University. She completed her doctoral degree in 2015 from Duke University in Durham. Dr. Scurria has also studied at La Schola Cantorum in Paris, France.

Teachers she studied with include: Chen Yi, Robert Sirota, Narcis Bonet, Anthony Kelley, and Stephen Jaffe. Her compositions have been performed in the United States, England, Brazil, Spain, Portugal, France, and Japan. She was a composer-in-residence at Shepherd College in Shepherdstown, West Virginia, in 2001.

== Personal life ==
In 2004, Amy Scurria married Zane Corriher. They have a daughter, Lily, who is also a composer.

== Honors and awards ==
- Duke University Evan Frankel Fellowship Recipient
- Duke University Aleane Webb Dissertation Research Award
- Duke University Summer Research Fellowship Recipient
- 1991 Northern Virginia Composition Competition
- 1998 Haddonfeld Young Composers' Competition
- ASCAP Award Recipient, 1999–present
- Winner of Haddonfield Young Composers Competition for Beyond All Walking, 1998
- Music highlighted at National Convention for Women in the Arts, Rice University, 1996
- Winner of N. VA Composition Competition, 1990
- Superior rating in National and State Piano Guild, 1988–91

== Works ==
Selected works include:

- Beyond All Walking for Full Orchestra, (1998)
- A Prayer for SATB Choir, (1999)
- And He Shall Be Like a Tree for SATB Choir and Organ/Piano, (2000)
- We Are Met at Gettysburg for full orchestra (2003) with Steve Heitzeg
- Adaptations (2007)
- La Loba (2008)
- Tiamat (2008)
- Something Borrowed, Something Blue (2008)
- What the Soul Remembers (2009)
- Esperanza Rising (2009)
- Pearl: An Opera in Two Acts (2015)
