= Songfest: A Cycle of American Poems for Six Singers and Orchestra =

1977 song cycle

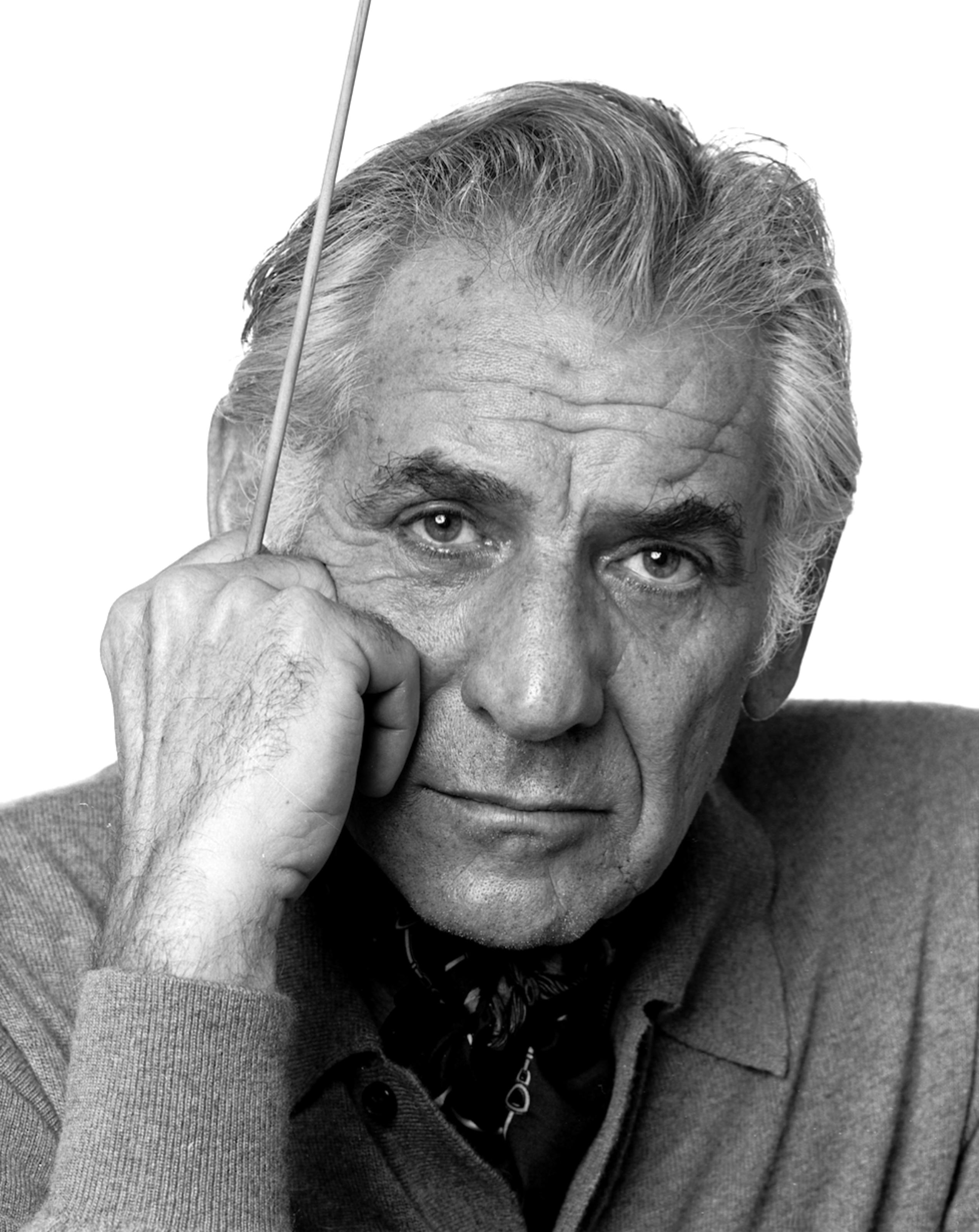
Leonard Bernstein in 1977

Songfest: A Cycle of American Poems for Six Singers and Orchestra is a 1977 song cycle by Leonard Bernstein. The cycle consists of 12 settings of 13 American poems, performed by six singers in solos, duets, a trio, and three sextets.

The work was intended as a tribute to the 1976 American Bicentennial but was not finished in time. Each poem covers America's artistic past including marriage, creativity, love, and minority problems like women's rights, racism, and homosexuality. Its first complete performance was given by the National Symphony Orchestra conducted by the composer on October 11, 1977, at the Kennedy Center in Washington, D.C., a year later. The soloists were Clamma Dale (soprano), Rosalind Elias (mezzo-soprano), Nancy Williams (contralto), Neil Rosenshein (tenor), John Reardon (baritone), Donald Gramm (bass). The work was first performed on the West Coast in 1983 at the Hollywood Bowl, the composer conducting the Los Angeles Philharmonic.

On July 4, 1985, Bernstein conducted a nationally televised performance of Songfest as part of the National Symphony's annual A Capitol Fourth concert.

== Poems ==
Songfest includes settings of these poems:

1. "To the Poem" (Frank O'Hara) – sextet
2. "The Pennycandystore Beyond the El" (Lawrence Ferlinghetti) – baritone solo
3. "A Julia de Burgos" (Julia de Burgos) – soprano solo
4. "To What You Said" (Walt Whitman) – solo
5. "I, Too, Sing America" (Langston Hughes) / "Okay 'Negroes' " (June Jordan) – duet
6. "To My Dear and Loving Husband" (Anne Bradstreet) – trio
7. "Storyette H. M." (Gertrude Stein) – duet
8. "if you can't eat you got to" (e.e. cummings) – sextet
9. "Music I Heard with You" (Conrad Aiken) – solo
10. "Zizi's Lament" (Gregory Corso) – solo
11. "What Lips My Lips Have Kissed" (Edna St. Vincent Millay) – solo
12. "Israfel" (Edgar Allan Poe) – sextet

== Instrumentation ==
piccolo, 2 flutes, 2 oboes, english horn, E♭ clarinet, 2 B♭ clarinets, bass clarinet, 2 bassoons, contrabassoon, 4 horns, 3 trumpets, 3 trombones, tuba, piano, electric keyboard, bass guitar, harp, timpani, string orchestra, percussion.
