= Dominick Argento =

American composer (1927–2019)

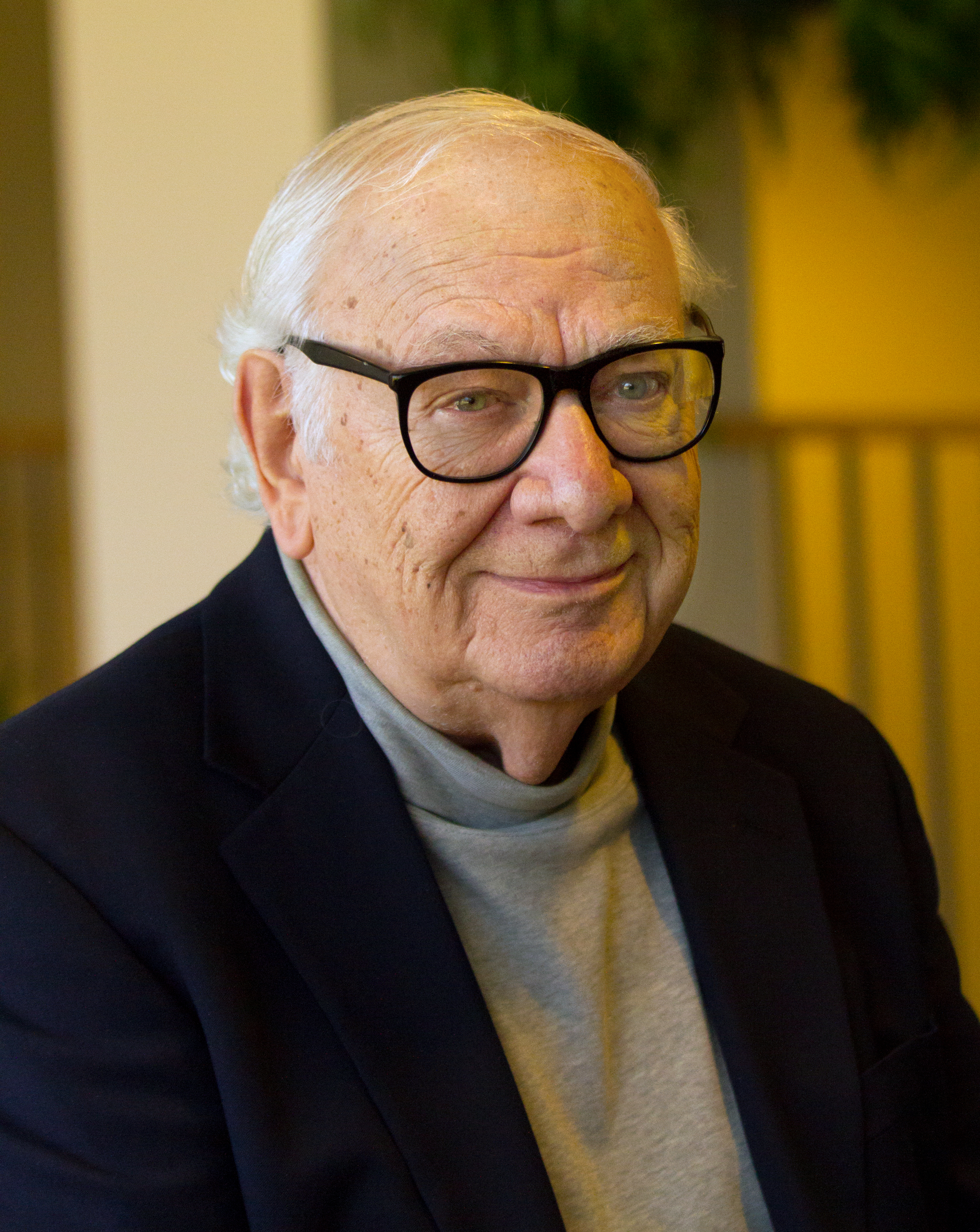
- Argento in April 2016
- Born: October 27, 1927; York, Pennsylvania
- Died: February 20, 2019 (aged 91); Minneapolis, Minnesota
- Education: Eastman School of Music
- Occupations: Composer, professor
- Known for: Composing music
- Notable work: Postcard from Morocco; Miss Havisham's Fire; The Aspern Papers; From the Diary of Virginia Woolf
- Awards: Guggenheim Fellowship (1957, 1964), Pulitzer Prize for Music (1975)

Dominick Argento (October 27, 1927 – February 20, 2019) was an American composer best known for his operatic and choral music. His compositions include the operas Postcard from Morocco, Miss Havisham's Fire, The Masque of Angels, and The Aspern Papers. His song cycle From the Diary of Virginia Woolf won the Pulitzer Prize for Music in 1975. Argento spent most of his time in Minnesota, where he taught at the University of Minnesota. Critics have described his style as blending tonal and atonal elements, sometimes incorporating twelve-tone technique.

During the 1950s, Argento spent extended periods in both the United States and Italy, often working in Florence, where he spent some time each year. As a university professor, he taught theory and composition. In 1963, he helped establish the Center Opera Company (now the Minnesota Opera).

Argento wrote 14 operas and numerous song cycles, orchestral works, and choral pieces for both small and large ensembles. Many of these were commissioned for and premiered by Minnesota-based artists. His wife, soprano Carolyn Bailey, frequently performed his compositions. Bailey died in 2006.

In 2009, Argento received the Brock Commission from the American Choral Directors Association.

== Early life and education ==
Argento was born in York, Pennsylvania, to Sicilian immigrants. In his memoir, he called his elementary school music classes "fifty-minute sessions of excruciating boredom". After graduating from high school, he was drafted into the Army, where he worked as a cryptographer. After World War II ended, he began studying piano performance at the Peabody Conservatory in Baltimore under the G.I. Bill, but later decided to focus to composition.

Argento earned a bachelor's and a master's degree from Peabody, where his teachers included Nicolas Nabokov, Henry Cowell, and Hugo Weisgall. He was briefly music director of the Hilltop Musical Company, which Weisgall founded as an opportunity for American composers to present new work. The company's stage director, John Olon-Scrymgeour, later collaborated with Argento on several operas. Argento also spent a year in Florence on a scholarship from the U.S.-Italy Fulbright Commission, which he later called "life-altering". While there, he studied briefly with Luigi Dallapiccola.

Argento received his PhD in music from the Eastman School of Music, where he studied with Alan Hovhaness, Bernard Rogers, and Howard Hanson. He was then awarded a Guggenheim Fellowship that allowed him to continue his work in Florence for another year. He gradually adopted the practice of spending extended periods there through his career.

== Minnesota years ==
Argento moved to Minneapolis in 1958 with his wife, Carolyn Bailey, to teach theory and composition at the University of Minnesota. His students included composers Philip Brunelle, Juliana Hall, Libby Larsen, Stephen Paulus, and Marjorie Rusche. Within a few years, he received commissions from many performing groups there. He noted there was a strong community interest in his work.

Argento became involved in writing music for productions at the Guthrie Theater. In 1963, he and Scrymgeour founded the Center Opera Company, later the Minnesota Opera, to be in residence at the Guthrie. For the occasion, Argento composed the short opera The Masque of Angels, commissioned by the Walker Art Center. This work's harmonic language and emphasis on choral writing foreshadows his later focus on choral composition.

In 1971, Argento's opera Postcard from Morocco opened at Center Opera and was reviewed favorably in The New York Times. Argento was later commissioned by the New York City Opera, Minnesota Opera, Washington Opera, and the Baltimore and St. Louis symphonies. He also collaborated with singers including Frederica von Stade, Janet Baker, and Håkan Hagegård.

== Choral prominence and later life ==
In the 1970s, Argento began writing choral works for the choir of Plymouth Congregational Church in Minneapolis, which was directed by Philip Brunelle. The partnership with Brunelle yielded commissions and premieres at Plymouth Church and at the Minnesota Opera, where Brunelle was music director. During this period, Argento composed Jonah and the Whale (1973), co-commissioned by Plymouth Congregational Church and St. Mark's Episcopal Cathedral. He later received larger commissions for choral works, composing for ensembles including the Dale Warland Singers, the Buffalo Philharmonic Orchestra, Buffalo Schola Cantorum, and the Harvard and Yale glee clubs.

A recording by Frederica von Stade and the Minnesota Orchestra of his song cycle Casa Guidi won the 2004 Grammy Award for Best Contemporary Classical Composition. Also in 2004, he published Catalogue Raisonné as Memoir, an autobiographical discussion of his works.

Argento retired from teaching but retained the title of Professor Emeritus at the University of Minnesota until his death. In March 2008, the Cathedral Choral Society at Washington National Cathedral premiered his Evensong: Of Love and Angels, written in memory of his late wife and in honor of the cathedral's centennial. In July 2014, the Minnesota Beethoven Festival Chorale in Winona, Minnesota, under the direction of Dale Warland, premiered his choral cycle Seasons, setting texts by Pat Solstad.

Argento died at his home in Minneapolis in 2019.

== Works ==
=== Operas ===
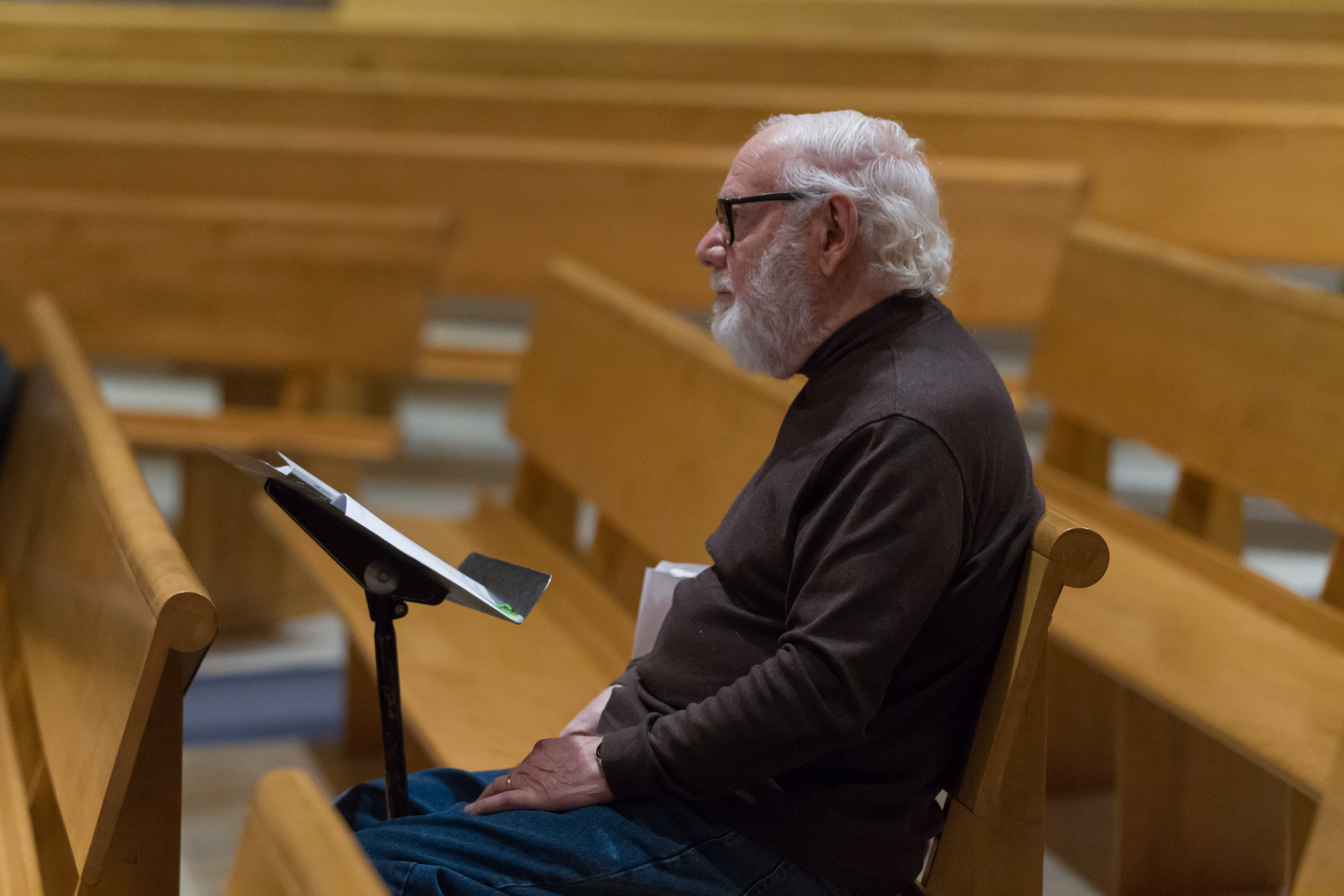
Argento at the rehearsal of his opera The Boor in 2017

Argento's operatic output is eclectic and extensive. He withdrew two early operas, written while he was a student—Sicilian Limes and Colonel Jonathan the Saint. The Boor, written in 1957 as part of his Ph.D. studies at Eastman, premiered that year under Boosey & Hawkes and was performed in 2017 by the Metropolitan Symphony Orchestra. Argento collaborated with John Olon-Scrymgeour on several works, including The Masque of Angels; Christopher Sly (1962), based on an episode from The Taming of the Shrew; and The Shoemaker's Holiday (1967), a "ballad opera" based on a play by Thomas Dekker.

After the 1971 premiere of Postcard from Morocco, which had a libretto by Jon Donahue, Argento received commissions. The University of Minnesota and Minnesota Opera together commissioned The Voyage of Edgar Allan Poe in 1975-76, with a libretto by Charles Nolte. As a result of that work, the New York City Opera commissioned him. He composed Miss Havisham's Fire (1977), with a libretto by Scrymgeour. It was not initially well-received, and Argento revised it into a one-act monodrama, Miss Havisham's Wedding Night, which the Minnesota Opera premiered on May 1, 1981, at the Tyrone Guthrie Theater in Minneapolis, conducted by Philip Brunelle. He revised Miss Havisham's Fire in 1995, and it has been revived in later performances.

In 1984, the Minnesota Opera commissioned Casanova's Homecoming, with a libretto by the composer. It was later staged at New York City Opera. The opera won the 1986 National Institute for Music Theatre Award.

Argento next composed The Aspern Papers (1987) as a vehicle for Frederica von Stade, with his libretto adapted from the 1888 novella by Henry James. His next opera was The Dream of Valentino, which premiered at the Kennedy Center in 1993. Critic Anne Midgette of The New York Times wrote that Argento's operas tend to be very well received upon their premieres but lack an "easy popular hook" and are rarely revived.

=== Song cycles and "monodramas" ===
Argento's song cycles often use dramatic, unusual text, most often prose that does not have immediately apparent musical possibilities. His works blur the distinction between straightforward groupings of songs and dramatic works, which he terms "monodramas". From the Diary of Virginia Woolf, written for Janet Baker in 1974, won the Pulitzer Prize for Music.

Other prominent works in a similar vein include Letters from Composers (1968), which uses as its text letters written by Chopin, Puccini, and others; Casa Guidi (1983), which sets letters written by Elizabeth Barrett Browning; and A Few Words About Chekhov (1996), which adapts letters by Anton Chekhov.

Argento's other song cycles are highly varied:

- A Water Bird Talk (1974–76) is a one-act monodrama adapted from Chekhov's "On the Harmful Effects of Tobacco," with images and passages from John James Audubon's Birds of America;
- The Andrée Expedition (1980) includes journal entries made by Swedish balloonist Salomon Andrée and excerpts from a personal diary and letters of his companion Nils Strindberg during their failed three-man expedition in 1897 to the North Pole by hydrogen balloon; and
- Miss Manners on Music (1998) sets to music newspaper clippings by American 20th-century advice columnist Judith Martin (aka "Miss Manners").

One of the few song cycles Argento has written that uses "traditional" verse as a text is his Six Elizabethan Songs. Other solo vocal works by Argento include:

- Songs About Spring (1950–55), text by E. E. Cummings, for voice and piano
- Ode to the West Wind (1956), text by Percy Bysshe Shelley, for soprano and orchestra
- To Be Sung Upon the Water (1972), text by William Wordsworth, for voice, clarinet and piano
- The Bremen Town Musicians (1998), text by the composer, a "children's entertainment" with narrator and orchestra

=== Major choral works ===
Argento's The Masque of Angels (1963) has sections, such as the "Gloria" and "Sanctus", that are frequently excerpted and performed separately. His next major choral work was The Revelation of St. John the Divine (1968), which sets portions of the Book of Revelation from the Bible; it is scored for male chorus, brass, and an array of percussion instruments.

Peter Quince at the Clavier (1979), a setting of the poem by Wallace Stevens, was commissioned by Pennsylvania State University in honor of the state's tercentenary (both Stevens and Argento are Pennsylvania natives). For the Dale Warland Singers, Argento wrote I Hate and I Love (1981), with text by Catullus, and Walden Pond (1996), based on excerpts from Thoreau.

In 1987, Argento composed a large-scale Te Deum that integrates the Latin text with medieval English folk poetry. A Toccata of Galuppi's (1989), a 20-minute setting of a Robert Browning poem, is one of many works inspired by Argento's time in Florence. In 2008, the Harvard Glee Club premiered his Apollo in Cambridge, a multi-movement setting of texts by Harvard-affiliated writers of the 19th century.

Other choral works by Argento include:

- A Nation of Cowslips (1968), seven bagatelles on nonsense text by Keats
- Tria Carmina Pasachalia (1970), an Easter cantata for women's chorus
- Jonah and the Whale (1973), a large-scale oratorio on medieval English texts
- Spirituals and Swedish Chorales (1994)
- Walden Pond: Nocturnes and Barcarolles (1997, SATB choir, three cellos, harp)
- Dover Beach Revisited (2003), refers to the poem "Dover Beach" written by Victorian Matthew Arnold; Argento's work was composed for the Yale Glee Club
- Four Seascapes (2004); words of Herman Melville, Mark Twain, Henry James, and Thornton Wilder set to music
- Numerous anthems for choir and organ and a cappella motets
- Evensong: Of Love and Angels (2008, full orchestra, SSAATTBB choir, two soprano soloists)
- Seasons (2014, SATB choir a cappella)

=== Orchestral works ===
Argento's non-vocal output is relatively small; there are no symphonies and just one string quartet, written when he was a student. He produced numerous orchestral suites based on his operas, including Le tombeau d'Edgar Poe (1985), adapted from The Voyage of Edgar Allan Poe, and the Valentino Dances (1994), from The Dream of Valentino. He wrote two ballets that were fashioned into orchestral suites, The Resurrection of Don Juan (1956) and Royal Invitation (Homage to the Queen of Tonga) (1964). His 1982 Fire Variations was nominated for the Kennedy Center's Friedheim Award in Music.

Other orchestral works include:

- Divertimento (1954) for piano and strings
- Variations for Orchestra (The Mask of Night) (1965)
- Bravo Mozart (1969), an "imaginary biography"
- A Ring of Time (1972) for orchestra and bells
- In Praise of Music (1977), a set of "songs" for orchestra
- Capriccio ‘Rossini in Paris’ (1985), essentially a clarinet concerto
- Reverie (Reflections on a Hymn Tune) (1997)
- Other small works for chamber groups of instruments

== Discography ==
- In Praise of Music (1977), with the Minnesota Orchestra, conducted by Eiji Oue, Reference Recordings, 2002
- Casa Guidi (1983), with Frederica von Stade and the Minnesota Orchestra, conducted by Eiji Oue, Reference Recordings, 2002
- Capriccio for Clarinet and Orchestra (1986), with Burt Hara and the Minnesota Orchestra, conducted by Eiji Oue, Reference Recordings, 2002
- Dominick Argento: Three Works; Odyssey Opera of Boston, Studio Recording, released in 2019 - The Boor, Miss Havisham’s Wedding Night, A Water Bird Talk, conducted by Gil Rose
- Walden Pond (1997), The Dale Warland Singers, Gothic Records, 2003
