= Philip Brunelle =

American choral scholar, conductor and organist

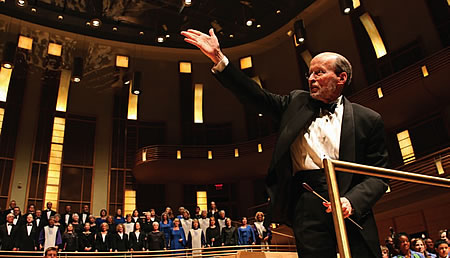
Philip Brunelle takes a bow at the end of the concert America Sings! in 2006.

Philip Brunelle (born July 1, 1943) is an American choral scholar, conductor and organist. He is the founder of VocalEssence. In the course of an international career as a choral and opera conductor Brunelle has been awarded Commander of the Royal Norwegian Order of Merit and made an Honorary Member of the Order of the British Empire as well as receiving Hungary's Kodály Medal, the Ohtli medal from Mexico, and Sweden's Royal Order of the Polar Star. He has received honorary doctoral degrees from Gustavus Adolphus College, St. John's University (Collegeville, MN), St. Olaf College, United Theological Seminary, and the University of Minnesota.

== Life and career ==
Brunelle was born in Faribault, Minnesota and studied at the University of Minnesota School of Music. His father, an Evangelical United Brethren minister, died when he was 13. While still in his teens, Brunelle worked as a professional church organist, and at the age of 19 he became a full-time member of the Minnesota Orchestra as a pianist and percussionist. At the age of 25, Brunelle was appointed choirmaster of Plymouth Congregational Church in Minneapolis, a position which he has held since 1969 and which led to the founding of VocalEssence (originally called the Plymouth Music Series). In 1969, he also became the music director of the Minnesota Opera. During his 17 years with the company, he introduced many new works, including three operas by Dominick Argento under whom he had studied at the University of Minnesota.

Among Brunelle's recordings are Paul Bunyan, by Benjamin Britten; The Tender Land, by Aaron Copland; The World Beloved: A Bluegrass Mass, by Carol Barnett; Welcome Christmas: Carols & Lullabies from Around the World; and Kaddish, by Lawrence Siegel.
