= VocalEssence =

Non-profit choral music organization

- Choir
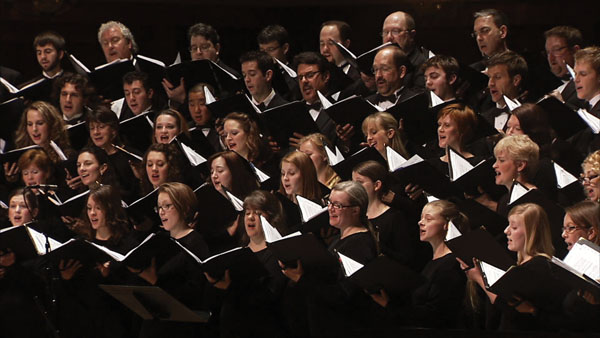
- Members of the VocalEssence Chorus & Ensemble Singers in Concert.
- Former name: Plymouth Music Series
- Founded: 1969
- Founder: Philip Brunelle, Plymouth Congregational Church
- Artistic Director: Philip Brunelle
- Headquarters: Minneapolis, Minnesota
- Website: www.vocalessence.org

VocalEssence is a non-profit choral music organization based in Minneapolis, Minnesota. Each year the organization presents a series of concerts featuring the 130-voice VocalEssence Chorus and its core group, a 32-voice professional mixed chorus called the Ensemble Singers, along with guest soloists and instrumentalists.

VocalEssence was founded in 1969 under the name Plymouth Music Series as a community music program of Plymouth Congregational Church and incorporated as a separate 501(c)(3) organization with its own board of directors in 1979. The organization changed its name to VocalEssence in 2002. It has 10 full- and part-time staff members including artistic director Philip Brunelle and Executive Director Amy Jaine Wielunski.

== Repertoire ==
VocalEssence has commissioned over 130 new works ranging from brief a cappella pieces to full scale choral and symphonic works. VocalEssence has co-commissioned operas with Opera Theatre of St. Louis (Loss of Eden by Cary John Franklin) and the Library of Congress (Barnum’s Bird by Libby Larsen).

The ensemble's history is filled with notable performances, often included new works by composers from far-off countries and other regions; in some cases, Brunelle simply cold-called composers to get permission to do new works. A notable local tie-in were 1996 and 2024 productions of ABBA pop group members Benny Andersson and Björn Ulvaeus' musical Kristina, about a family migrating from Sweden to Minnesota.

== Discography ==
The organization has released nine recordings, including four compact discs of classical music by African American composers (The WITNESS Collection), two discs featuring guest artist Garrison Keillor, a recording of American folksongs and the world premiere recording of The World Beloved: A Bluegrass Mass by Carol Barnett, featuring the bluegrass ensemble Monroe Crossing. VocalEssence also re-released its world premiere recording of Conrad Susa's Carols and Lullabies: Christmas in the Southwest.

== Awards ==
VocalEssence has received the ASCAP Award for Adventurous Programming of Contemporary Music five times and it was awarded the once-in-an-organizational lifetime Margaret Hillis Achievement Award for Choral Excellence in 1996.
