= Minnesota Orchestra =

Symphonic orchestra based in Minneapolis, Minnesota, USA

- Orchestra
- Former name: Minneapolis Symphony Orchestra
- Founded: 1903
- Location: Minneapolis, Minnesota, United States
- Concert hall: Orchestra Hall
- Music director: Thomas Søndergård
- Website: www.minnesotaorchestra.org

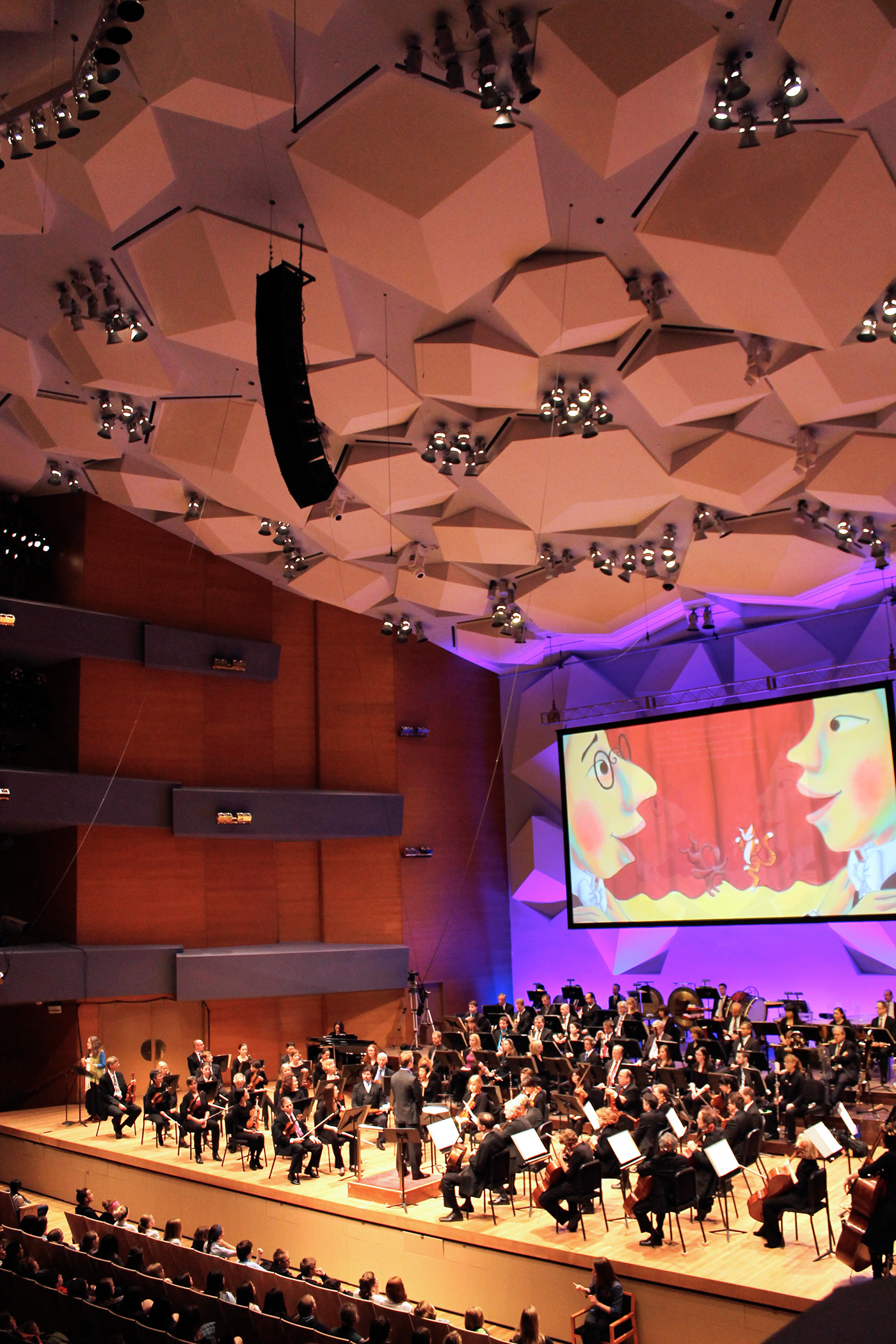
Interior shot of Orchestra Hall during a Young People's performance.

The Minnesota Orchestra is an American orchestra based in Minneapolis, Minnesota. Founded originally as the Minneapolis Symphony Orchestra in 1903, the Minnesota Orchestra plays most of its concerts at Minneapolis's Orchestra Hall.

== Awards and Recognition ==
The Minnesota Orchestra has been nationally and internationally recognized as a performing arts ensemble. In 2014, it received a Grammy Award for Best Orchestral Performance for its recording of Jean Sibelius's Symphonies Nos. 1 and 4. In 2021, the orchestra was named Gramophone Magazine's Orchestra of the Year, an honor decided by public vote among ten internationally nominated orchestras, ahead of finalists including the Berlin Philharmonic and Cleveland Orchestra. In 2022, the orchestra's broadcast and digital concert series, This is Minnesota Orchestra, won a Regional Emmy Award.

== History ==
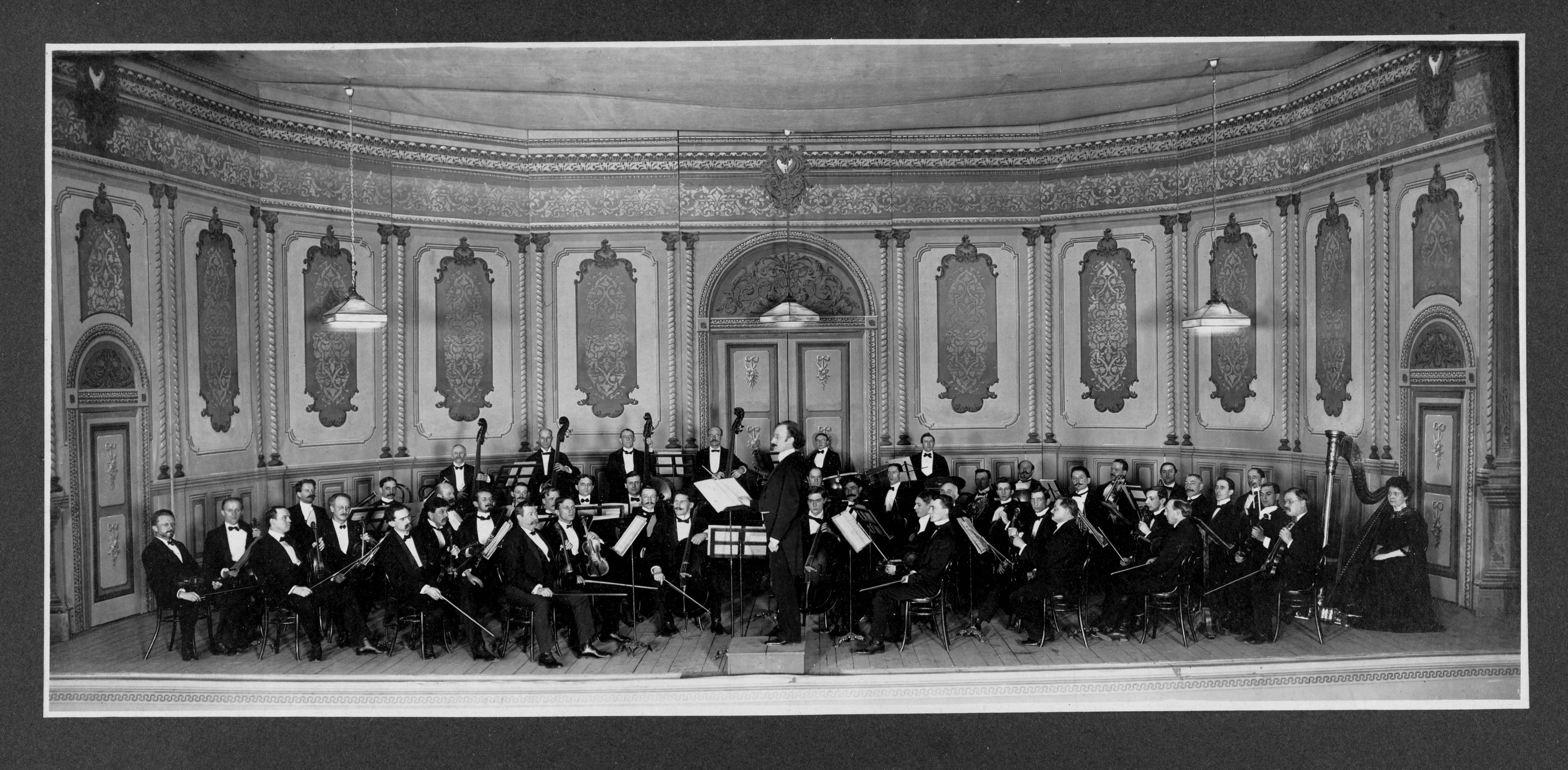
Emil Oberhoffer conducting the Minneapolis Symphony Orchestra in the 1904-1905 season.

The eighth major orchestra established in the United States, the Minnesota Orchestra was founded by Emil Oberhoffer as the Minneapolis Symphony Orchestra in 1903. It gave its first performance on November 5, 1903, in Minneapolis's Exposition Building. In 1911, it began a series of children's concerts under the sponsorship of the Young People's Symphony Concert Association (YPSCA), which continues to this day. Early in the 1920s, the orchestra was one of the first to be heard on recordings and on the radio, playing a nationally broadcast concert with guest conductor Bruno Walter in 1923. In 1968, the orchestra changed its name to the Minnesota Orchestra. It makes its home in downtown Minneapolis's Orchestra Hall, which was built for the ensemble in 1974. The orchestra's previous hall, starting in 1929, was Northrop Memorial Auditorium on the University of Minnesota's Minneapolis campus.

In October 2012, the Minnesota Orchestral Association (the orchestra's governing body) locked out the orchestra's musicians after failing to reach a new collective bargaining agreement, canceling the entire 2012–13 season. Music director Osmo Vänskä resigned amid the dispute. The lockout ended in January 2014 when the musicians and the association reached a new agreement, and Vänskä returned as music director in 2014 for the 2014–2015 season. The lockout followed several years of financial strain, including investment losses during the 2008 financial crisis and mounting operational deficits.

In July 2017, the orchestra announced the extension of Vänskä's contract as music director through the 2021–22 season. In December 2018, the orchestra announced that Vänskä would conclude his tenure as music director at the close of the 2021–2022 season. He is to take the title of conductor laureate.

In May 2015, the Minnesota Orchestra performed in Havana, Cuba, as a result of the Cuban Thaw, becoming the first professional U.S. orchestra to play in Cuba since the Milwaukee Symphony Orchestra in 1999. In August 2018, it became the first professional U.S. orchestra to perform in South Africa. In January 2022, the orchestra, Vänskä, and Elina Vähälä gave the North American premiere of the original 1904 version of Jean Sibelius's Violin Concerto.

In December 2021, Thomas Søndergård first guest-conducted the orchestra. He returned for another guest-conducting engagement in April 2022. In July 2022, the orchestra announced Søndergård's appointment as its next music director, effective with the 2023–2024 season, with an initial contract of five seasons. In February 2026, the orchestra announced the appointment of Leonidas Kavakos as its new principal guest conductor, effective with the 2027–2028 season, with an initial contract of three years. In April, the orchestra and its musicians agreed on a new two-year labor contract, which lasts through August 31, 2028.

== Music directors ==
- Emil Oberhoffer (1903–1922)
- Henri Verbrugghen (1923–1931)
- Eugene Ormandy (1931–1936)
- Dimitri Mitropoulos (1937–1949)
- Antal Doráti (1949–1960)
- Stanisław Skrowaczewski (1960–1979)
- Neville Marriner (1979–1986)
- Edo de Waart (1986–1995)
- Eiji Oue (1995–2002)
- Osmo Vänskä (2003–2022)
- Thomas Søndergård (2023–present)

=== Principal guest conductors ===
- Leonard Slatkin (1975–1979)
- Klaus Tennstedt (1979–1982)
- Charles Dutoit (1983–1986)
- Leonidas Kavakos (designate, effective autumn 2027)

== Recordings ==
The orchestra first began recording (by the acoustical process) under Henri Verbrugghen in 1924 for Brunswick, and in the following years produced some landmark records. Among these was the first electrical recording of Mahler's Resurrection Symphony with Eugene Ormandy, who recorded extensively with the orchestra for RCA Victor in the 1930s. In the 1940s, the Minneapolis Symphony was contracted to Columbia Records and made a series of records with Ormandy's successor, Dimitri Mitropoulos. These included the premiere recording of Mahler's First Symphony. Beginning in 1954 and continuing on through 1955, the group made the first complete recordings of Tchaikovsky's three ballets: Swan Lake, Sleeping Beauty, and The Nutcracker under the baton of Antal Doráti. In 1954, they also made the first recording of Tchaikovsky's 1812 Overture to include actual cannon fire, again under Doráti's direction. These recordings were made for Mercury Records as part of the Living Presence series.

In the 1970s, the renamed Minnesota Orchestra made a series of recordings for Vox Records under the direction of Stanisław Skrowaczewski. In the 1990s and 2000s, the orchestra recorded for the Reference Recordings label under the direction of music director Eiji Oue, winning a Grammy Award for Best Contemporary Classical Composition in 2003 with Casa Guidi. More recently, Osmo Vänskä conducted a cycle of the Beethoven symphonies and a cycle of the Sibelius symphonies, both for the Swedish label BIS. Their recording of Beethoven's Ninth Symphony, with the Minnesota Chorale, was nominated for a Grammy Award for Best Orchestral Performance in 2007, as was their recording of Sibelius's Second and Fifth Symphonies in 2012. On January 26, 2014, the Minnesota Orchestra and Vänskä won the Grammy Award for Best Orchestral Performance for their recording of Sibelius's 1st and 4th symphonies. In August 2017, the orchestra released a recording of Mahler's Fifth Symphony, starting a cycle of the Mahler symphonies. In November 2017, that recording was nominated for a Grammy Award for Best Orchestral Performance.

== Discography ==
- Dominick Argento: Casa Guidi, Capriccio for Clarinet and Orchestra and In Praise of Music, with Frederica von Stade and Burt Hara, conducted by Eiji Oue, Reference Recordings, 2002

== Summer festival ==
Begun in 1980 with Leonard Slatkin at the helm, the orchestra's summer festival has been known by several names, beginning with "Viennese Sommerfest," changing to "MusicFest" in 2001, and eventually reverting to "Sommerfest" in 2003. Sommerfest concerts are held at Orchestra Hall over a four-week period in midsummer. The orchestra also offers free live music on the plaza before and after each show, in genres varying from folk to jazz to polka. Slatkin was artistic director of Sommerfest from 1980 to 1989. Andrew Litton was the festival's artistic director from 2003 to 2017.

The orchestra's "creative partner for summer programming" is Jon Kimura Parker, whom the orchestra named to the post in 2019. In July 2022, the orchestra announced an extension to Parker's summer programming contract through August 2024.
