= Sexton (surname) =

Sexton (Irish: Ó Seasnáin) is a surname of Irish origin.

== Geographical distribution ==
At the time of the United Kingdom Census of 1901 (the data for Ireland) and the United Kingdom Census of 1881 (the data for the rest of the United Kingdom), the frequency of the surname Sexton was highest in the following counties:

1. County Clare (1: 264)
2. County Limerick (1: 678)
3. County Cavan (1: 681)
4. County Cork (1: 694)
5. Norfolk (1: 1,199)
6. County Kildare (1: 1,305)
7. County Sligo (1: 1,413)
8. County Longford (1: 1,460)
9. Suffolk (1: 2,676)
10. County Leitrim (1: 2,894)

As of 2014, the frequency of the surname was highest in the following countries and territories:

1. Republic of Ireland (1: 2,082)
2. Guernsey (1: 2,629)
3. United States (1: 6,802)
4. Australia (1: 9,071)
5. New Zealand (1: 9,695)
6. England (1: 10,290)
7. Tuvalu (1: 11,323)
8. Wales (1: 13,717)
9. Marshall Islands (1: 14,022)
10. Scotland (1: 17,208)

As of 2014, 76.8% of all known bearers of the surname Sexton were residents of the United States. The frequency of the surname was higher than national average in the following U.S. states:

1. Kentucky (1: 1,380)
2. Tennessee (1: 1,934)
3. Alabama (1: 3,091)
4. Arkansas (1: 3,409)
5. Indiana (1: 3,607)
6. West Virginia (1: 3,609)
7. South Carolina (1: 3,611)
8. Ohio (1: 3,682)
9. Virginia (1: 4,058)
10. Oklahoma (1: 4,519)
11. North Carolina (1: 4,646)
12. Alaska (1: 5,362)
13. Iowa (1: 5,563)
14. Kansas (1: 5,799)
15. Missouri (1: 6,006)
16. Georgia (1: 6,117)
17. Michigan (1: 6,360)

The frequency of the surname was highest (over 20 times the national average) in the following U.S. counties:

1. Scott County, Tenn. (1: 39)
2. Letcher County, Ky. (1: 56)
3. Nicholas County, Ky. (1: 115)
4. Crenshaw County, Ala. (1: 133)
5. Wayne County, Ky. (1: 154)
6. Morgan County, Tenn. (1: 181)
7. Knott County, Ky. (1: 184)
8. Hancock County, Tenn. (1: 186)
9. Morgan County, Ky. (1: 186)
10. Menifee County, Ky. (1: 210)
11. Billings County, N.D. (1: 219)
12. Union County, Tenn. (1: 239)
13. Metcalfe County, Ky. (1: 243)
14. Carter County, Ky. (1: 262)
15. Wise County, Va. (1: 272)
16. Grayson County, Va. (1: 281)
17. Cottle County, Texas (1: 290)
18. Bath County, Ky. (1: 299)
19. Hart County, Ky. (1: 300)

== People ==
- Andrew Sexton (born 1979), English cricketer
- Ann Sexton (1950–2025), American soul singer
- Anne Sexton (1928–1974), American poet
- Austin O. Sexton (1852–1908), American politician
- Brendan Sexton III (born 1980), American film actor
- Cameron Sexton (born 1970), American politician
- Chad Sexton (born 1970), American rock drummer
- Charlie Sexton (born 1968), American guitarist, singer and songwriter
- Chelsea Sexton (born 1975), American advocate of alternative fuel vehicles
- Ciara Sexton (born 1988), English professional Irish dancer
- Collin Sexton (born 1999), American basketball player
- Dan Sexton (born 1987), American ice hockey player
- Damian Sexton (born 1968), Australian footballer
- Dave Sexton (1930–2012), English football player and manager
- Edwin Sexton (c.1923-1983), American politician
- Edward Sexton, British tailor
- Frank Sexton (baseball) (1872–1938), American baseball player and coach
- Franklin Barlow Sexton (1828–1900), American Confederate politician
- Gwain Noot Sexton (1909–2007), Canadian-born American author, illustrator, visual artist, fashion designer
- Helen Sexton (1862–1950), Australian surgeon
- J. Edgar Sexton (1936–2019), Canadian judge
- James Sexton (1856–1938), English trade unionist and politician
- Jesse Sexton (1885–1948), American politician
- Jimmy Sexton (baseball) (born 1951), American professional baseball player
- Jimmy Sexton (sports agent) (born 1963)
- John Sexton (born 1942), American academic, president of New York University
- John Sexton (photographer) (born 1953), American fine art photographer
- John Henry Sexton (1863–1954), Baptist minister in South Australia
- John W. Sexton (born 1958), Irish poet
- Johnny Sexton (born 1985), Irish rugby player
- Joseph Sexton, American journalist
- Joseph Sexton (horticulturist) (1842–1917), American horticulturist
- Katy Sexton (born 1982), British Olympic swimmer
- Laoisa Sexton (fl. 2004 -), Irish actress, playwright and short filmmaker
- Lee Sexton (1927–2021), American banjo player
- Leo Sexton (1908–1968), American 1932 Olympic athlete in the shot put
- Linda Gray Sexton (born 1953), American author and editor, daughter of Anne Sexton
- Lloyd Sexton, Jr. (1912–1990), American/Hawaiian artist
- Mae Sexton (born 1955), Irish politician from Longford-Roscommon
- Margaret Wilkerson Sexton, American novelist
- Mary Sexton, Canadian film and television producer from Newfoundland
- Martin Sexton (contemporary), American musician from Syracuse, New York
- Mike Sexton (1947–2020), American professional poker player and commentator
- Mike Sexton (politician) (born 1961), American politician
- Nik Sexton (born 1980), Canadian film and television director from Newfoundland
- P. Wayne Sexton, Sr. (contemporary), American Republican politician
- Randy Sexton, current general manager of the NHL's Florida Panthers
- Richard Sexton, American photographer
- Robert J. Sexton, American director
- Rosi Sexton (born 1977), British mixed martial arts fighter
- Sam Sexton (born 1984), British heavyweight boxer
- Tim Sexton (born 1949), American producer, music supervisor, and environmental entrepreneur
- Tobe Sexton (born 1968), American actor, singer, dancer, producer, director
- Tom Sexton (disambiguation)
- Tommy Sexton (1957–1993), Canadian comedian from Newfoundland
- William Sexton (politician) (1819–1895), Canadian farmer, auctioneer, and politician
- Wyatt Sexton (born 1984), American college football player
