= Walnuts in California =

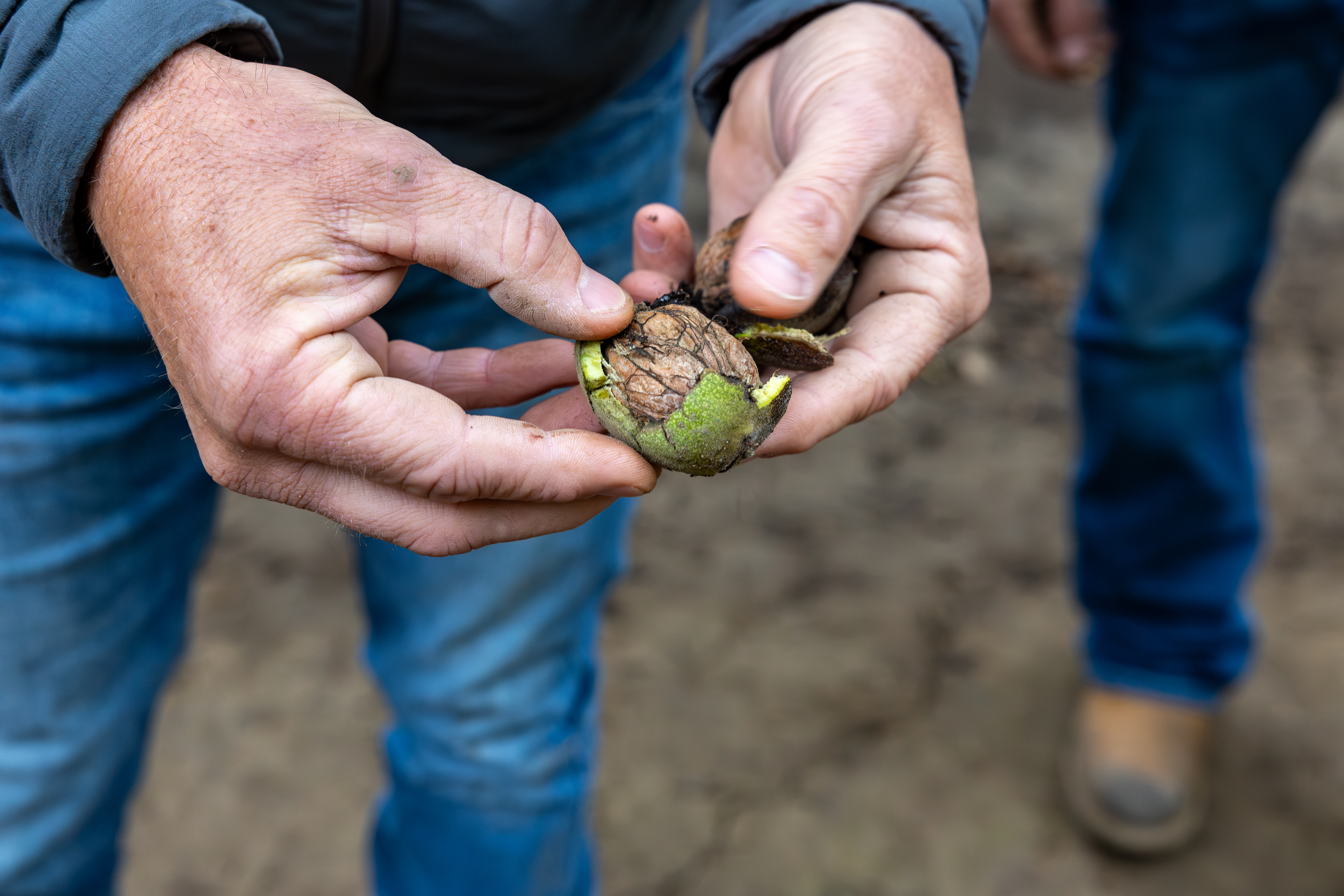
Chandler Walnut on a Glenn County farm close to the Sacramento River during harvest season 2023

Walnuts are an indigenous fruit species of California. Juglans californica is native to Southern California and the Central Valley, whereas Juglans hindsii is native to the northern parts.

Franciscan Fathers first introduced the English walnut around the 1770s from South America to California. As of 1998, walnuts from California account for 99% of all walnuts grown in the United States, and for 38% of the world's production of walnuts.

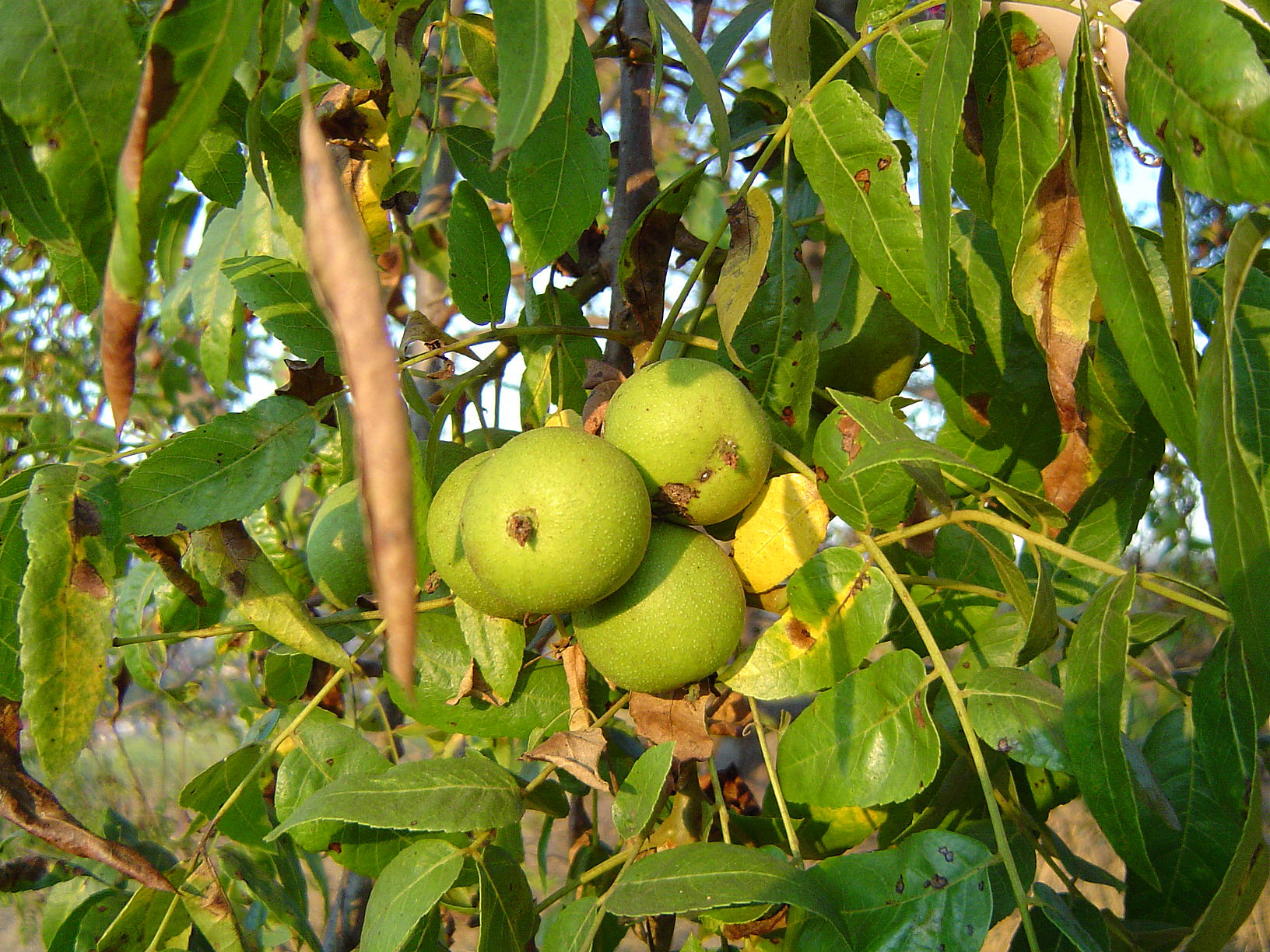
Southern California Black Walnut

== History ==
=== Indigenous use ===
Black walnuts are an important foodstuff for indigenous Californians, including the Yokuts, who also use the hulls in their traditional dice. Hot asphaltum is poured into the empty shells, then pressed with beads made from Olivella sp. or abalone shell.

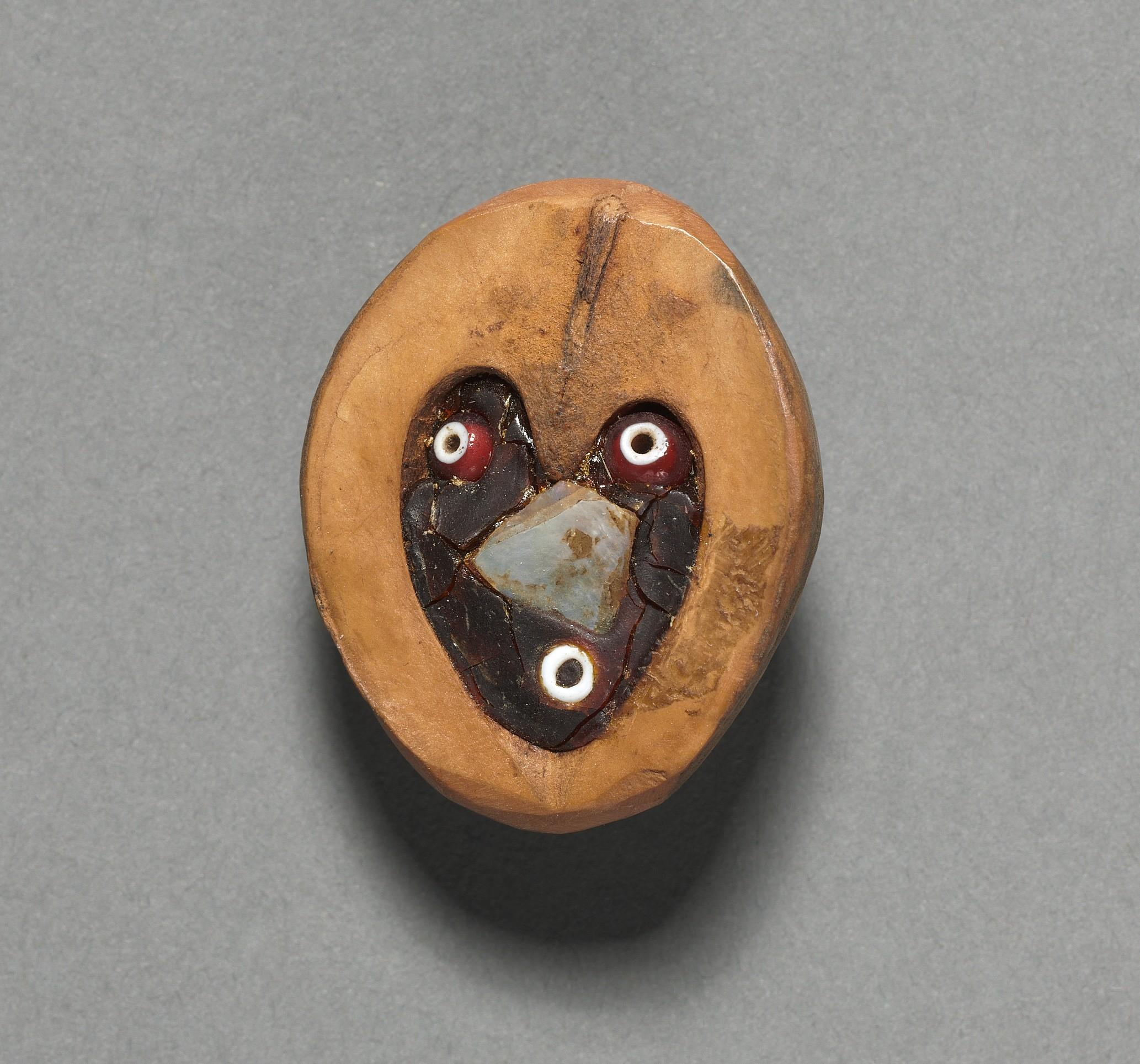
Yokuts gambling die, made with pine pitch and black walnut shell.

=== European use ===
The first walnut orchard to be planted by Europeans in California was in 1856, by Ozro W. Childs, in what is now the center of Los Angeles. William Wolfskill, who is considered the founder of the first commercial orange orchards in California, also planted hard-shell English walnuts in the Los Angeles Area. Other early walnut growers of both hard- and soft-shell varieties include Russell Heath, Frank E. Kellogg and William Huston Nash, and W. E. Stuart.

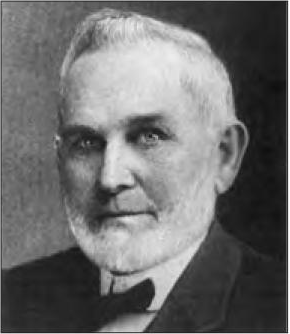
Joseph Sexton (1842-1917), founder of the first soft-shell walnut orchard in California. His nuts helped start the walnut industry in Southern California.

In the winter of 1869, Joseph Sexton planted the first known commercial walnut orchard in Goleta, California, after purchasing a bag of English walnuts in San Francisco that he was told were from Chile or China, no one knows for certain. This orchard contained 1000 trees, of which 250 were part of Sexton's personal orchard. Around the same time in 1870, Felix Gillet, a nurseryman in Nevada City, California, was importing scion wood and nursery stock from France. Gillet is credited with introduction of Franquette and Mayette cultivars to California, as well as other French cultivars. Gillet established his orchard in Northern California in 1871. He grafted and budded the French cultivars for commercial use and used a selection program for his seed to cultivate new varieties of walnuts suited for California. Many of the varieties of the walnuts grown in California were introduced by Gillet and Sexton; out of 35 varieties, the 7 varieties they introduced from seedlings and selections make up 82 percent of total walnut acreage.

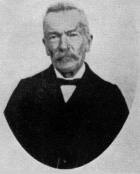
Felix Gillett (1835-1908), was the founder of the Barren Hill Nursery, in Nevada City, California.

From 1879 to 1885, Luther Burbank conducted the first walnut breeding experiments, observing that walnut species easily fertilized with each other. He observed that the hybrid walnut trees were more vigorous that either parent trees. Burbank gave name Royal to hybrids between eastern American black walnuts (J. nigra) and northern California black walnuts (J. hindsii). He also named hybrids between north California black walnuts and English walnuts (J. regia) "Paradox". Growers eventually accepted that the Paradox hybrids had superior attributes being more vigorous and disease resistant to crown and root rot.

A modern-day variety of walnuts grown California is the Serr walnut, developed by UC Davis professors Eugene F. Serr and Harold I. Forde. From 1945-1968, their extensive walnut-breeding program created seedlings which exhibited desirable traits such early production, moderate tree vigor, pest and disease tolerance, and high nut quality. From 1,734 controlled cross walnut seedlings, Serr and Forde selected 10 new English walnut varieties for release in 1968. The Serr variety (named after Serr's death in 1968) now occupies 23,667 acres, or 12 percent, of California walnut acreage. Other varieties selected were Tehama, Gustine, Chico, and Vina. Forde continued making specific crosses and progeny evaluations until retiring in 1978. His persistence resulted in the release of four more Serr-Forde selections: Chandler, Howard, Sunland, and Tulare. The Chandler variety, a late-leafing, lateral-bearing walnut is very popular with California walnut growers. It represented 75 percent of nursery stock delivered in 1993.

With the expansion of the walnut industry, growers soon experienced problems in marketing their crop. The rapid increase in acres planted to walnut and lack of organization resulted in prices fluctuations and buyers unfairly competing with one another for commissions. In 1933, the Walnut Marketing Board was formed under the Agricultural Adjustment Act, to oversee quality control and marketing of the walnut in California. To this day the Walnut Marketing board is responsible for implementing the federal marketing order for California walnuts. To emphasize its role in managing the walnut market, the Walnut Control Board changed its name in 1962 to the Walnut Marketing Board. To further promote the export of walnuts, the California Walnut Commission was created in 1987 the governor of California. The commission differs from the Walnut Marketing Board, which by a federal order is responsible for standards, statistics, crop estimates, research, and domestic marketing.

== Economic impact ==
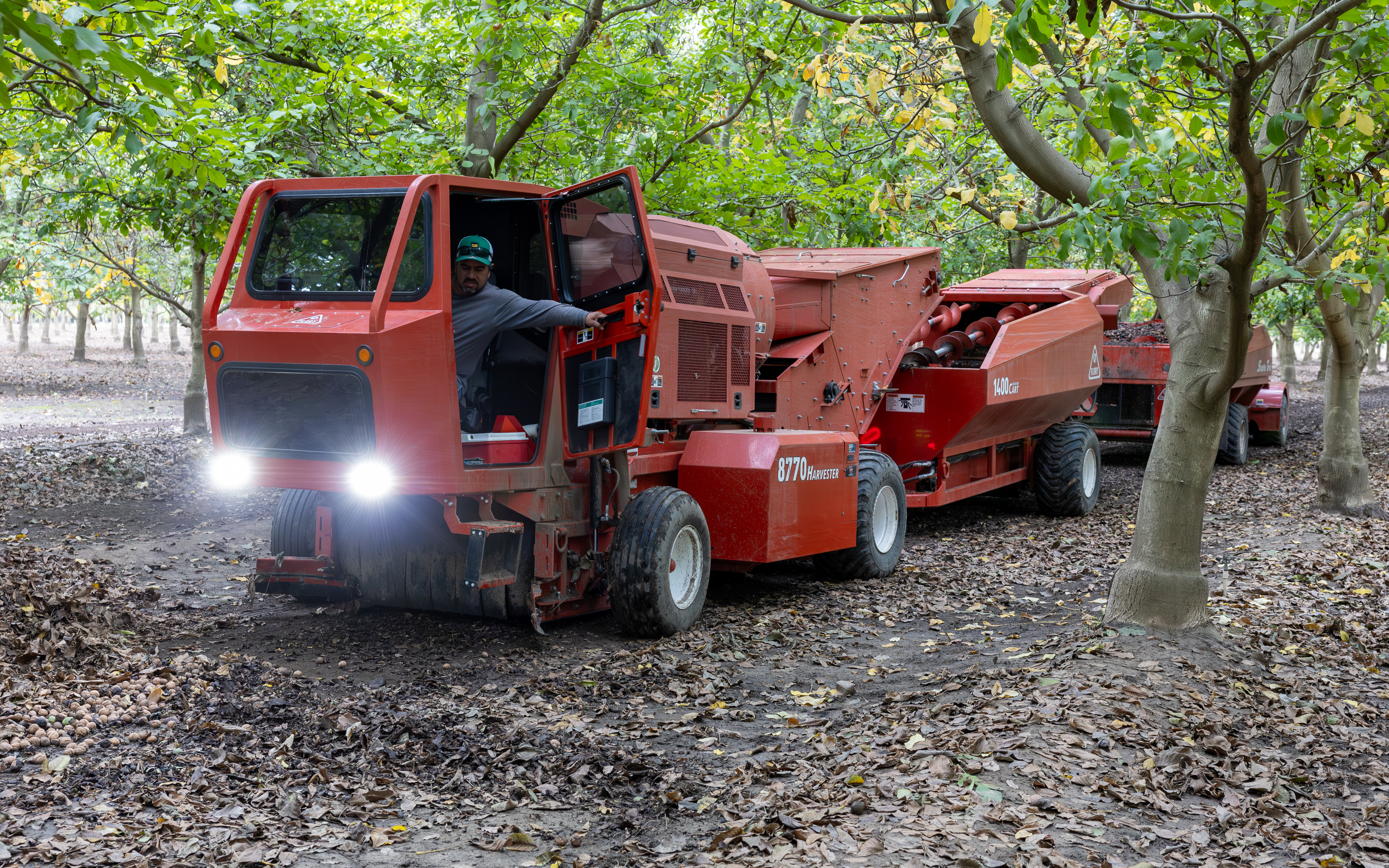
FLORY 8770 Harvester during the 2023 walnut harvest in Glenn County

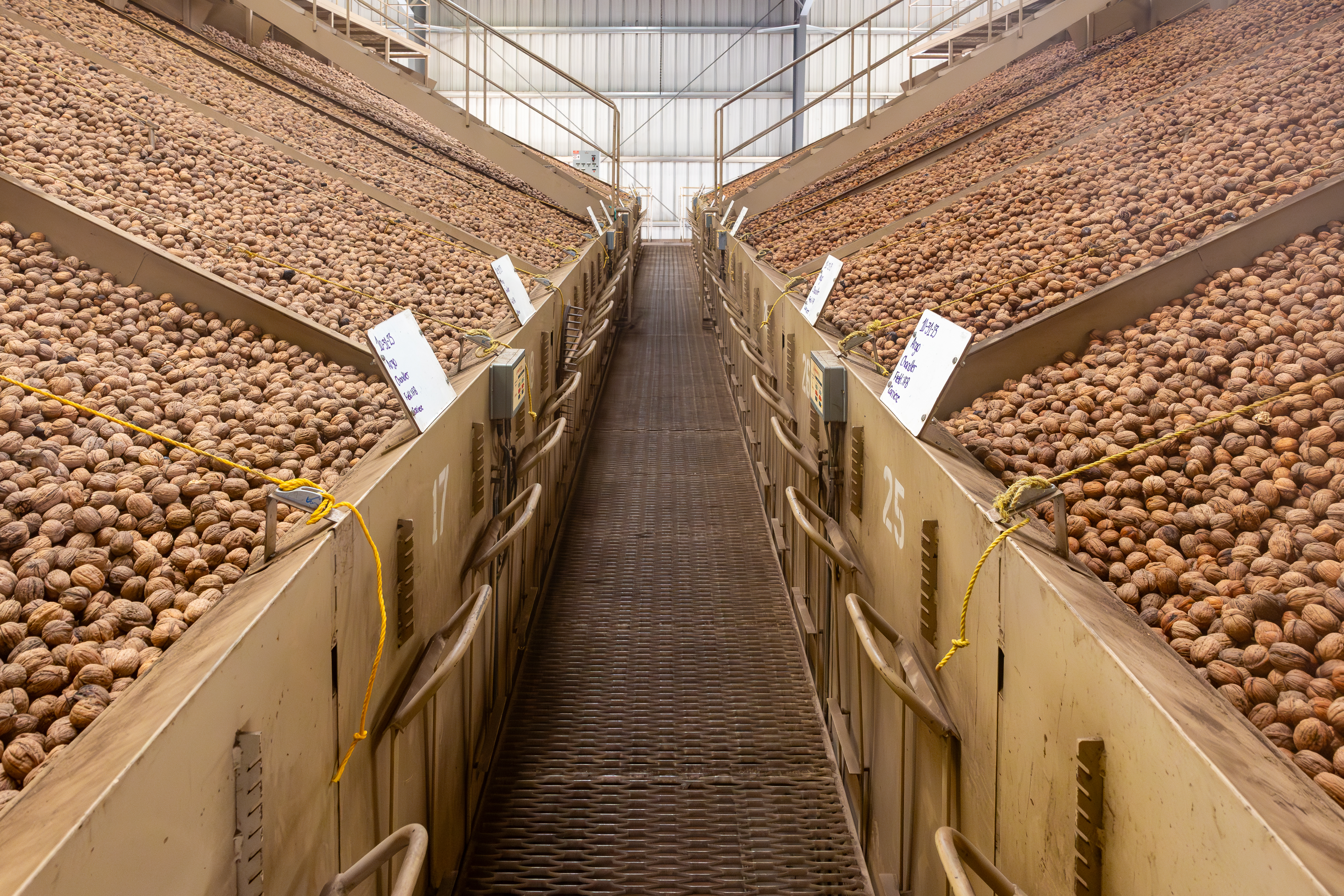
Walnuts in a nut huller and dehydrator near Willows

In 2018, California produced 676,000 tons of walnuts, up from 2017 where 630,000 tons were produced. Walnut production was the seventh most valuable agricultural commodity in California in 2017, valuing at $1.59 billion in cash receipts. California also leads the nation in walnut production, producing 100 percent of all walnuts grown in the United States. As a result of the trade war between the United States and China, farmers in California received about $76.3 million in federal subsidy payments from USDA, where some of the subsidies were received by walnut farmers.

Over the past ten years, as production has increased, total acreage used in the production of walnuts has increased along with it; in a USDA report, walnut-bearing acreage in California grew 53 percent from 218,000 acres in 2007, to 335,000 acres. Yield per acre also increased, from 1.50 tons per acre in 2007 to 1.87 tons per acre in 2017, an increase of about 25 percent.

=== Exports ===
In 2017, an estimated $1.37 billion of walnuts was exported from California to foreign countries. It was California's fifth most valuable agricultural export after wine, pistachios, dairy products and almonds. The largest importers of California walnuts were the European Union, Japan, Turkey, and South Korea; the European Union imported the most walnut, with 36% of all walnuts exported.

Recently, several countries have changed their tariff policy on walnuts from California. In 2018, exports to India, the 8th largest importer of California walnuts, declined after as a result of weakness in the Indian rupee, and after a 100% import tariff was levied on the crop, up from 30.9%. Before the tariff, India imported 10,468 tons of walnuts. In September 2019, a trade deal was reached between the United States and Japan, reducing and eliminating tariffs on key agricultural goods. The deal announced a reduction of tariffs on U.S. wine, tomato paste and beef, while completely eliminating tariffs on almonds and walnuts. Walnuts have been significantly affected by trade disputes, facing high tariffs in China and Turkey, losing an estimated $700 million as a result.

=== Processing and handling industry ===
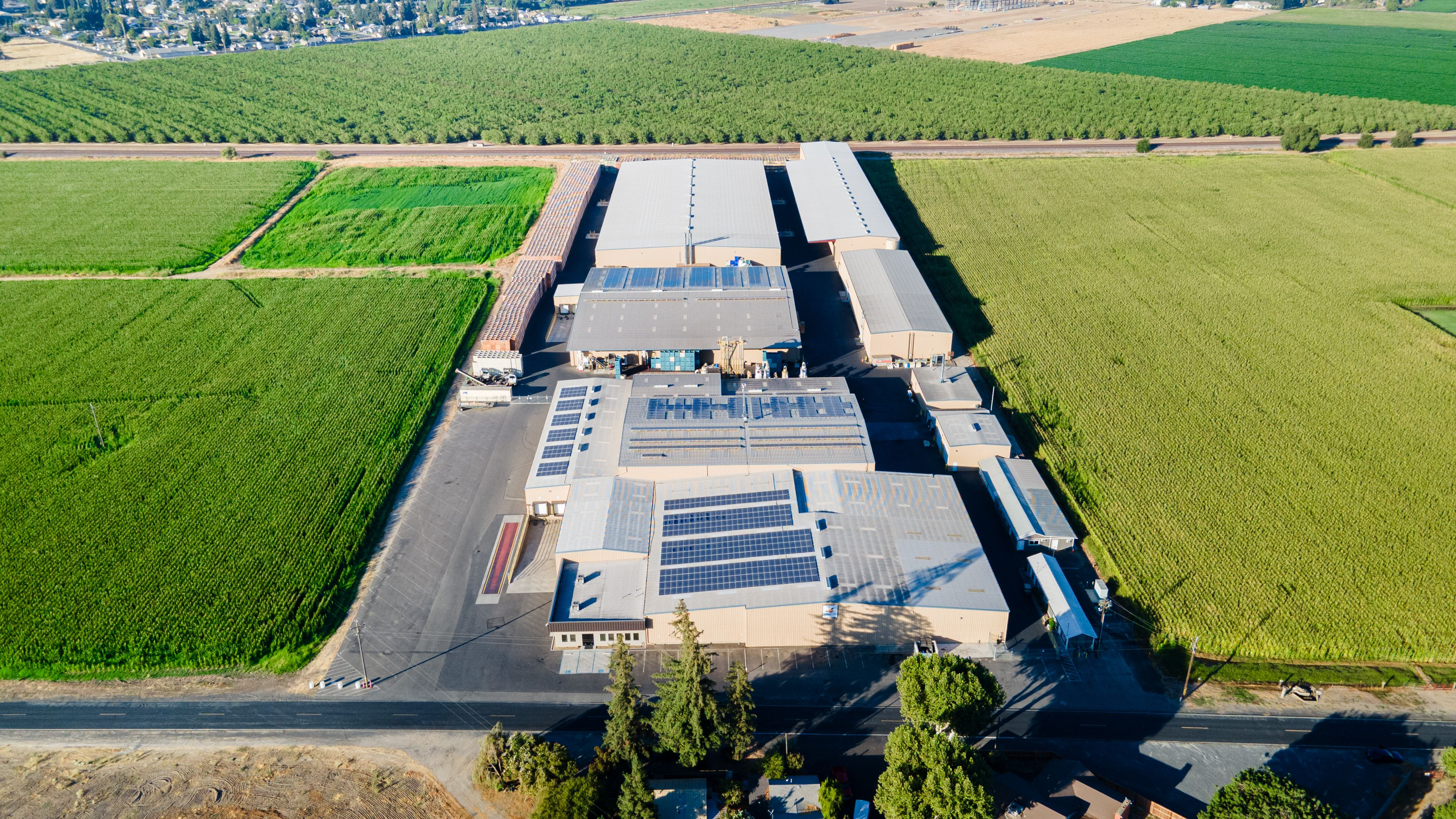
DeRuosi Nut Processing Facility

California's walnut industry includes a network of handlers, shellers, packers, and processing facilities concentrated primarily in the Central Valley. The California Walnut Board and California Walnut Commission state that the industry includes about 4,000 growers and approximately 72 handlers, and that California accounts for more than 99 percent of U.S. English walnut production and approximately half of world walnut trade.

The California Walnut Board's handler list identifies industry services including in-shell handling, shelling, vacuum packaging, kosher certification, custom shelling, and processing facilities. A review of the handler list shows 48 handlers using the "PF" product code, meaning "processing facility". These processing facilities form the industrial core of the California walnut sector, preparing walnuts for domestic sale, ingredient use, and export markets through shelling, sorting, packaging, storage, and distribution operations.

Historically, California walnut processing was dominated by Diamond Walnut Growers, a cooperative founded in 1912. A University of California, Davis study reported that the cooperative's share of California walnut deliveries peaked at 58 percent in 1983 and remained about 46 percent at the time of its conversion into Diamond Foods, a publicly traded corporation, in 2005. The study described Diamond's Stockton processing facility as the largest and most modern walnut processing facility in the world at the time.

Federal marketing-order data projected handler receipts of 730,000 tons, or approximately 1.46 billion pounds, of assessable California walnuts during the 2024–2025 marketing year. The scale of the crop has supported the development of large vertically integrated walnut processors that combine shelling, sorting, packaging, storage, and export distribution.

Several California walnut processors publicly report handling volumes in the tens of millions of pounds annually. Grower Direct Nut Company reported processing nearly 100 million pounds of walnuts during the 2016 growing season. DeRuosi Nut states that its Escalon processing complex handles nearly 50 million pounds of California walnuts each season at a 500,000-square-foot facility. Diamond Foods reports that its Stockton operations generate approximately 100 million pounds of walnut shells annually for industrial and agricultural reuse.

Walnut processing is also a major regional industry in parts of the northern San Joaquin Valley. The city of Escalon identifies walnut processing as one of its principal industries, and the San Francisco Chronicle has described DeRuosi Nut as operating one of the world's largest walnut processing facilities. Industry publications have also described Mariani Nut Company as one of the world's largest privately held walnut and almond processors.

California processors also handle specialty walnut varieties. DeRuosi Nut became associated with commercial handling of the Livermore red walnut, a red-kernel walnut cultivar developed in California and marketed as a specialty product.

=== Production cost ===
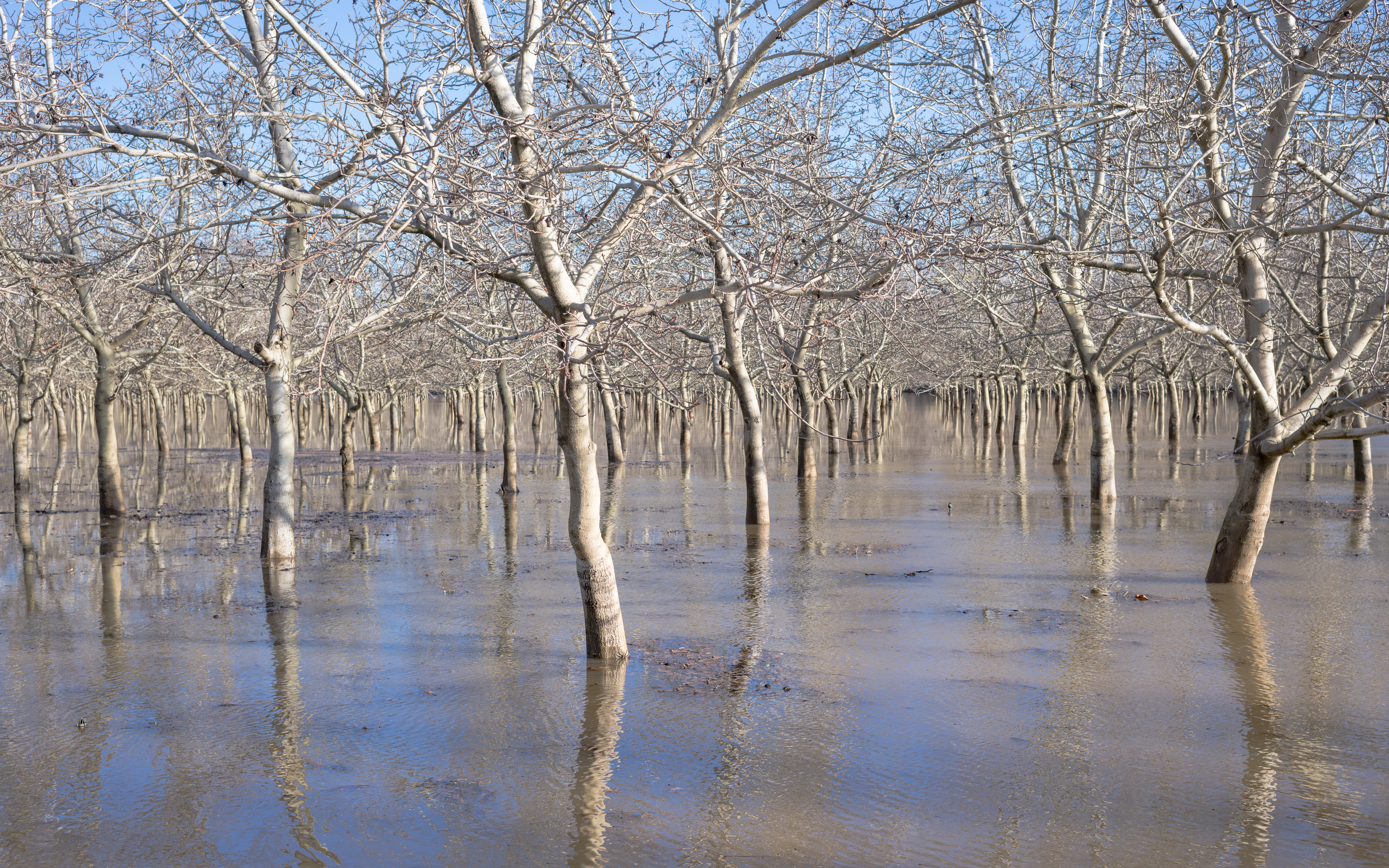
Flooded walnut orchard in Butte County after several atmospheric rivers hit California in early 2023

In order to produce walnuts in California, multiple factors must be taken into account in order for orchards to be success. One study by the University of California, Davis, sets out specific guidelines on and the costs associated with establishing an orchard and producing walnuts. For instance, as a result of new legislature passed by the State of California, companies with more than 25 employees are to pay their laborers $11 per hour starting in 2018, and increase hourly wages each year buy $1 until the minimum wage is $15 per hour. This, along with lower thresholds for overtime pay, has increased the cost of labor used on farms. Machine operating costs also determine the cost of production, where diesel gasoline is subject to a 13 percent state sales tax, as well as regular gasoline, which is subject to a 10.17 percent tax. Property taxes are calculated differently in each county, and so, are 1 percent of the average value of the property. This ends up being $325 per acre per year after 5 years. Property insurance is also needed to run an orchard according to guidelines. The cost of property insurance is calculated as 0.846 percent of the average value of the orchard's assets over their useful life. Liability insurance, which ensures that an orchard is able to pay a legal obligation for liability damages, is estimated to be $810 for the entire orchard. Crop insurance is necessary, as well; available to walnut growers, this insures against unavoidable loss of production, damage or poor quality resulting from adverse weather condition.

== Pests ==
Rodents and lagomorphs (jackrabbits, hares, other rabbits) are more abundant around hedgerows in orchards here, in a survey by Sellers et al., 2018. Although there is concern they may eat the nuts, and they are known to carry Salmonella, Giardia, and Cryptosporidium, Sellers does not find any actual yield loss or nut contamination.
