= Live or Die =

Live or Die may refer to:

- Live or Die (poetry collection), a 1966 collection of poetry by Anne Sexton
- "Live or Die" (song), a single by Naughty by Nature from Nineteen Naughty Nine: Nature's Fury
- "Live or Die", a song by Mark Eitzel from his 1997 album West
- Liver or Die (TV series), a 2019 South Korean television series
