= Her Kind (poem) =

Poem

"Her Kind" is a poem published in 1960 by American poet Anne Sexton. Writing throughout the Cold War, Sexton was keenly aware of the economic importance of American housewives in the 1960s. "Her Kind" concludes with an "[un]ashamed" (20) confession of suicide-desire that individualizes death against a twentieth-century backdrop of genocide and survival anxiety. The poem describes a witch in the night, then describes her as an unconventional housewife, and concludes with reference to Carl Dryer's The Passion of Joan of Arc.

== Form ==
"Her Kind" is divided into three seven-line stanzas with the refrain "I have been her kind" every seventh line. The refrain parodies popular advertising techniques of the 1960s, specifically "This Is Your Wife," campaigns that reduced women to specific social roles.

== Publication ==
"Her Kind" was published in Anne Sexton's first book, To Bedlam and Part Way Back, against the advice of her mentor, John Holmes. He warned her that she would regret her transparent and confessional style. Sexton understood this advice as Holmes' desire to censor her, and dedicated the first poem of the book's second section to him ("To John, Who Begs Me Not to Enquire Further"), after composing a letter she never sent to him.

== Themes ==
=== Motherhood during the Cold War ===
Sexton's experience with motherhood is portrayed in her speaker's self-depiction as a witch who tends to the "worms and the elves" (11). Instead of human children, worms and elves represent perversity within the family unit, beginning with the witch mother. Many 1960s American housewives were expected to perform the duty of motherhood, and their failure to perform maternal care would result in disapproval and shaming from their suburban peers. Sexton, however, stated that instead of children, it was writing that "gave [her] a feeling of purpose, a little cause." Sexton's depiction of motherhood in "Her Kind" was socially considered to be a poor reflection upon both her family and the United States.

=== Witches and communism ===
In an interview with Gregory Fitz Gerald, Sexton joked, "The Puritans would have burned me at the stake, of course." In "Her Kind," Sexton identifies herself as a witch when she describes the various forms of social rebellion she has performed. In the first stanza, the witches' movement from the private sphere to the public sphere uses diction, such as "haunting" (2), "dreaming evil," and "done my hitch" (3) to portray sexist and capitalist fears of women in the public arena at the time.

While the Cult of Domesticity located American women inside the home, under communism women were encouraged to work in the public sphere. The diction used in the first stanza aligns the witches' physical agency with the then American paranoia of communism, Her voyage outward to the "warm caves" subverts conventions of motherhood in an animalistic fashion. However, the witch does still perform the domestic duties of a housewife as Sexton illuminates the consequences of automatically socializing girls and women into only maids, cooks, mothers, and homemakers. The third stanza references Joan of Arc, the French icon who was burned at the stake in 1431 for the witch-like charge of summoning demons, but was later declared a saint in 1920. Sexton's reference diffuses the significance of patriarchal labels as it is a reminder that the socially established distinction between a "witch" and a "saint" is both subjective and ambiguous. In the second stanza, the witch attempts to perform domestic life inside the cave by filling it with common household objects and cooking dinner, but her consumerist approach at maternity is ultimately void of personal significance or meaning beyond her obligation to perform motherhood. This section of the poem reflects the context of America's rising GDP from 1945 to 1960, because women then began to substitute their female identities with commercial products due to consumerism. In a letter to her mother, Sexton wrote "my heart's desire is an electric mix-master with the orange juice squeezer on top." Sexton's sarcasm is a critique of the advertisement-crazed America as she experienced it. In an interview with Patricia Marx, Sexton referred to the "brainwashing pablum of advertisements every minute" that she parodies with the refrain in "Her Kind."

== Performance ==
"Her Kind" was always the first poem read by Sexton at public readings, and Sexton admitted that she derived an "orgasmic" pleasure from her performance. Sexton once referred to her performance personality as a "little bit of a ham," and gave her readings only in theatrical outfits. She always had her nails polished and painted, a standard she had maintained since her modeling career. It has been noted that Anne's own performance of femininity was inspired by her distant mother, Mary Gray Harvey. In her life, Harvey was celebrated for her unusually composed feminine demeanor and grand intellectual presence, only the latter she passed on to Anne.

== Criticism ==
Sexton sought to distance herself from what she described as "over-literary, over-intellectualized" early post-war poetry. The most common complaint against Sexton's work, however, and especially so in To Bedlam and Part Way Back, is a perceived over-indulgence of the self, a hallmark of "confessional poetry." John Holmes refuted her work on a fundamental level, stating that "her motives are wrong artistically." Likewise, James Dickey found himself unable to appreciate Sexton's confessional style because it was too transparently autobiographical. By contrast, other critics such as Robert Phillips and Laurence Lerner contend that the often exposed biographical content of confessional poetry displays bravery on the author's behalf. Even though Sexton's confessional poetry is not solely rooted in fact, critics like Patricia Meyer Spacks asked, "How can the reader properly respond to lines as grotesquely uncontrolled as these?"
