= Massimo Scolari =

Italian architect, painter and designer

Massimo Scolari (born in Novi Ligure, Piedmont, Italy, March 31, 1943), is an Italian architect, painter and designer.

== Career ==
Scolari graduated in architecture in Milan in 1969. In 1973 he became a professor of History of Architecture at Palermo, and of Drawing at the Istituto Universitario di Architettura di Venezia (IUAV). Between 1975 and 1993, he was visiting professor at various universities including: Cornell University, Cooper Union in New York City, the Institute for Architecture and Urban Studies in New York, Technische Universität in Vienna, Harvard University, and University of Cambridge. From 2006, he was a Davenport Visiting Professor at the Yale School of Architecture.

He is the editor of “Controspazio”, “Casabella”, “Lotus International” and is the director of “Eidos” (1989-1995) and a series of architectural books by Franco Angeli (1973-1988).

From 1989, he designed furniture for Italian design company Giorgetti, where he was also the art director until 2001.

== Drawings ==
Scolari is known for his drawings which, according to a review of his 1980 exhibition in New York, takes the form of a critique of architecture which calls to mind the surrealism of Salvador Dalí and Yves Tanguy. Pyramids and ziggurats, dams and forts, axonometric forms are used to create a new architectural "illogic".

He has held exhibitions in Europe, Japan, Russia and the United States. His works are in the permanent collections at the MoMA (New York), the German Architecture Museum (Frankfurt), and the Centre Pompidou (Paris).

Scolari was one of twenty architects to design an architectural facade as part of the Strada Novissima in The Presence of the Past exhibition at the 1980 Venice Biennale, which also featured drawings by Scolari. Scolari's drawings were featured in the book Postmodern Visions: Drawings, Paintings, and Models by Contemporary Architects (1985). He has published his own books of (or about) his work, including Hypnos (1986). Massimo Scolari: The Representation of Architecture, 1967–2012 (2012) is the catalogue of a retrospective exhibit held at the Yale School of Architecture, curated by Scolari himself. Oblique Drawing: A History of Anti-Perspective (2012) includes a series of essays and writing about his alternative approach to perception and representation. Pensar y representar (2013) provides an intellectual history of axonometric drawing and 'anti perspectives', central to Scolari's art.

== Recognition ==
In 2014 Scolari was the recipient of the Arnold W. Brunner Memorial Prize in Architecture, awarded by the American Academy of Arts and Letters in New York.
