= Sylvia's Death =

Poem by Anne Sexton

- by Anne Sexton
- Country: United States
- Language: English
- Publisher: Houghton Mifflin
- Lines: 140
- Pages: 3

"Sylvia’s Death" is a poem by American writer and poet Anne Sexton (1928–1974) written in 1963. "Sylvia's Death" was first seen within Sexton's short memoir “The Barfly Ought to Sing” for TriQuarterly magazine. The poem was also then included in her 1966 Pulitzer Prize winning collection of poems Live or Die. The poem is highly confessional in tone, focusing on the suicide of friend and fellow poet Sylvia Plath in 1963, as well as Sexton's own yearning for death. Due to the fact that Sexton wrote the poem only days after Plath's passing within February 1963, "Sylvia’s Death" is often seen as an elegy for Plath. The poem is also thought to have underlying themes of female suppression, suffering, and death due to the confines of domesticity subsequent of the patriarchy.

== Synopsis ==
“Sylvia’s Death” is a 3-page, 140-line elegiac poem dedicated to Sylvia Plath. The poem opens by asking Plath where she went, and how she found the courage to finally give in to suicide. Sexton continues to directly address Plath for the entirety of the poem. As the poem continues, Sexton writes of discussions, moments and the passionate wish for death the two shared throughout their letters and friendship. Nearing the end of the work, Sexton recognises the close relationship Plath held with death, and concludes the poem calling Plath a "friend", "tiny mother", "funny duchess" and "blonde thing".

== Background ==
=== Friendship with Plath ===
Despite growing up in the same town, Wellesley, Massachusetts, Sexton and Plath first met in Robert Lowell’s graduate writing class at Boston University in 1958. Sexton writes that once Sylvia Plath and George Starbuck heard she was attending the seminar "they kind of followed me in”, marking the beginning of a friendship between the three.

Starbuck recalls of the gatherings "They had these hilarious conversations comparing their suicides and talking and about their psychiatrists". It was their gatherings at The Ritz after their writing seminar that allowed Sexton and Plath to find a mutual bond over their yearning for death, in effect building their friendship. Sexton writes "We talked death with burned-up intensity, both of us drawn to it like moths to an electric light bulb. Sucking on it!”.

Plath's feelings of exclusion upon recognizing the beginning of Sexton's romantic relations with Starbuck are thought to have created a rift between the poets. In April, Plath began to recognize Sexton and Starbuck's relationship, and that it increased the likelihood of Sexton being published at Houghton Mifflin before Plath. In a journal entry dated 23 April, Plath wrote that she "felt [their] triple martini afternoons at The Ritz breaking up".

The extent and depth of the Sexton and Plath friendship has been questioned by some due its mostly one-sided record. A majority of the details about the friendship came from Sexton's end, within her brief memoir “The Barfly Ought to Sing” that was written and published after Plath's death. Sexton wrote “The Barfly Ought to Sing” after she was approached by TriQuarterly magazine who were writing a "Womanly Issue", including a tribute for Plath titled “The Art of Sylvia Plath”. Sexton first responded that she had “no contribution to make”, then later offered to expand on the friendship. Expanding on her and Plath's relationship, Sexton created essay. Sexton described it as a "small sketch" of the friendship, accompanied by "Sylvia's Death" alongside "Wanting to Die", written on February 3, 1964, roughly one year after "Sylvia's Death".

=== Plath's death ===
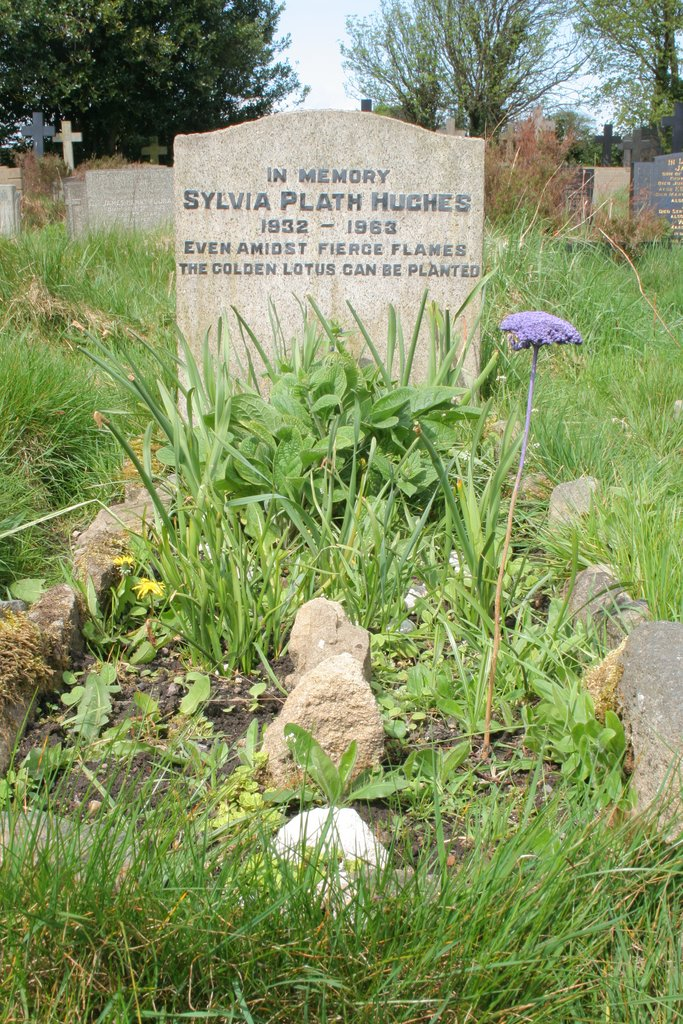
The grave of poet Sylvia Plath in Heptonstall

After living a life of manic depression and attempting suicide multiple times, Plath committed suicide on 11 February 1963 in her London flat. At around 4:00 am, Plath placed her head in an oven and gassed herself, dying of carbon monoxide poisoning. The surrounding doorways had been sealed by Plath, ensuring the safety of her sleeping children. Sexton seemed to have feelings of betrayal towards Plath taking her life, as the two had discussed their struggles with depression and yearning for death together. The death of Plath led to a resurfacing of Sexton's obsession with death and suicide, telling long term therapist Dr. Martin Orne “Sylvia Plath’s death disturbs me, makes me want it too. She took something that was mine”. Just over 10 years later, Sexton took her own life. Very similarly to Plath, Sexton locked herself in her garage, turned on the engine of her car and gassed herself. She died of carbon monoxide poisoning, just as Plath did.

== Style and technique ==
"Sylvia's Death" holds a consistent theme of suffering and death at the hands of female domesticity throughout the entirety of the poem.

Sexton employed her usual confessional style throughout "Sylvia's Death", candidly admitting her struggles and self-destructive desires. Parentheses are used within the poem to add specific details to the general memories and situations Sexton is writing about. Sexton also includes rhyme throughout, though more heavily within the beginning than end of the poem. A tidy structure is also seen, with lines being strictly paired in twos, and the small sections within parentheses ranging from 5 - 7 lines. Following "Sylvia's Death", Sexton wrote the rest of the poems in Live or Die without her usual rhyme scheme and structure (apart from one) and took on a new mode.

=== Sexton's use of confessional poetry ===
Sexton, by many, has been coined as the 'mother' of confessional poetry due to her consistent discussion of personal issues throughout her poetry, making it somewhat autobiographical. It was believed that Sexton employed this confessional style due to its therapeutic qualities, a theory easy to believe as her therapist, Dr. Martin Orne, suggested she begin writing poetry to help with cope with her mental illnesses. At first, Sexton held disdain for her title as a confessional poet, and seemed to invalidate the idea that she used the mode in an effort to heal, quoting “You don’t solve problems in writing. They’re still there.” Though as time went by, Sexton's stance on her use of the confessional style seemed to change, deeming herself “the only confessional poet”. Sexton's changing relationship with the confessional mode, as well as her distinct, eccentric works led critics such as M. L. Rosenthal, to question whether Sexton fit into the confessional genre at all.

== Analysis ==
It is thought that the writing of “Sylvia’s Death” acted as a psychological and emotional outlet for Sexton, assisting in the poet coming to terms with the loss of her friend. Throughout the poem, Sexton's projects her own wish for death and struggle with depression and housewivery.

The beginning stanzas discuss female domestic entrapment, with Sexton describing Plath's house as dead, built of stones and full of spoons to feed her meteor-like children, creating lifeless, almost robotic imagery of a household. Through the description of a jail cell-like home, Sexton highlights her own feelings of disdain and imprisonment due to the weight of domestic chores. A tone of aggression and sadness is used as Sexton calls Plath a “thief!”. Sexton feels as through Plath stole the death she wished for, finding the bravery that Sexton couldn't muster to “crawl down alone... into the death”. Throughout the poem Sexton personifies suicide as “our boy”, writing that his “job” of killing them is “a necessity, a window in a wall or a crib”. Within this, Sexton again addresses feminine domestic imprisonment and offers that Plath and herself so deeply long for death as it is a window out of the walls of their homes and motherly roles. Sexton, too, plants her own depressive feelings through the heavy repetition of the word “death”, as it underlines her obsession and anxiety surrounding death, seeing it as the only escape from her suffering. Diane Wood Middlebrook argued that 'Sylvia's Death’ has a “rivalrous attitude… a spurious tone, saturated with self-pity posing as guilt”. Through an ending depiction of Plath as a "funny duchess!", Sexton pays homage to the influence the two poets had on one another, alluding to a line within Plath's poem "The Beast".

== Reception ==
"Sylvia's Death" was seen by some as jealousy and envy disguised as a loving elegy. The poem was criticised by Galway Kinnell, Howard Moss who rejected the work to be published in The New Yorker, and Robert Lowell who wrote that "Sylvia's Death" had "too much push from the pathos". Although Sexton heavily defended the poem and held much pride within the work, writing it "[belongs] more to itself than to me". Despite being included in the award-winning collection of poems "Live or Die", alongside celebrated poems such as "Wanting to Die", "Suicide Note" and "The Wedding Night", "Sylvia's Death" did not receive much literary attention, with little to nothing being written on the work.
