= The Death Notebooks =

Poetry collection by Anne Sexton

- Author: Anne Sexton
- Language: English
- Genre: Poetry
- Publisher: Houghton Mifflin
- Publication date: January 1, 1974
- Publication place: United States
- Pages: 97
- ISBN: 0395182816
- Dewey Decimal: 811/.5/4
- LC Class: PS3537.E915 D4 1975

The Death Notebooks is a poetry collection by Anne Sexton. Published in 1974, the year of Sexton's death, it was her last to be published during her lifetime. (Her last book of previously uncollected poems, The Awful Rowing Towards God, was published posthumously.)

== Contents ==
- "Gods"
- "Making a Living"
- "For Mr. Death Who Stands with His Door Open"
- "Faustus and I"
- "The Death Baby"
- "Rats Live on No Evil Star"
- "Grandfather, Your Wound"
- "Baby Picture"
- "The Furies"
- "Praying on a 707"
- "Clothes"
- "Mary's Song"
- "God's Backside"
- "Jesus Walking"
- "Hurry Up Please It's Time"
- "O Ye Tongues"

Three of the poems consist of multiple parts:

- "The Death Baby" consists of 6 poems, titled "Dreams", "The Dye-dee Doll", "Seven Times", "Madonna", "Max", and "Baby".
- "The Furies" consists of 15 poems, each one's title beginning with "The Fury of"; the 15 Furies are "Beautiful Bones", "Hating Eyes", "Guitars and Sopranos", "Earth", "Jewels and Coal", "Cooks", "Cocks", "Abandonment", "Overshoes", "Rain Storms", "Flowers and Worms", "God's Good-bye", "Sundays", "Sunsets", and "Sunrises".
- "O Ye Tongues" consists of 9 poems, each one referred to as a "psalm" and titled in numerical order, as "First Psalm", "Second Psalm", and so on.

== Reception ==
Writing for The Hudson Review, Hayden Carruth praised "the same chic diction and glib irony" of Sexton's previous books. In the same review, Carruth lamented that Sexton "could not break through this self-consciousness more often", but still had some "real poems" that achieved this, singling out "The Fury of Guitars and Sopranos" as a highlight.

Jane Duran reviewed the collection for Ambit in 1975, shortly after Sexton's death. She compared the poems to those of Sylvia Plath, noting that Sexton's style is "more tempestuous. She rolls, coughs, sings out a succession of images which are often conflicting and jar against each other". Like Carruth, Duran wrote that she preferred Sexton's earlier poems, which she felt treated the subject of death with "greater control as well as lyricism".
