= Walnut Marketing Board =

The California Walnut Board or Walnut Marketing Board, founded in 1933, supports the California walnut industry. The organization was originally known as the Walnut Control Board, changing its name to the Walnut Marketing Board in 1962 and to the California Walnut Board in 2008. Its formation was authorized by the Agricultural Adjustment Act (AAA).

Under the AAA, the Walnut Control Board was authorized to assess crops and declare a percentage as surplus. Its 1934 assessment designating 30% of the crop as surplus met with local resistance. In 2009, responding to a request from the Board, the United States Department of Agriculture purchased $30 million of the crop, which was distributed to nutrition assistance programs.

The AAA's application to walnuts was affirmed by Federal Marketing Order 984 in 1948. The USDA and the organization date its foundation to that year. Federal regulations govern its operations. As of 2008, the Board consisted of five grower representatives, four handler representatives, and one member of the public, all serving two-year terms.

The Board continues to implement the Marketing Order. Its activities now include the promotion of walnuts in the US diet, research funding, product grading, and compilation of crop statistics. The USDA oversees its operations.

An analysis of its domestic marketing program, published in 2002, concluded that its cost-benefit ratio was favorable.
