= The Presence of the Past =

Architecture exhibition

"The Presence of the Past" official exhibition poster for Fort Mason Center, San Francisco, 1982.

The Presence of the Past was the International Architecture Exhibition of the 1980 Venice Biennale, curated by Italian architect Paolo Portoghesi. The exhibition was the first architecture exhibition at the Venice Biennale, and twenty international architects were commissioned to design building facades representing their architectural approach, which were installed in a former rope factory at the Venetian Arsenal. The facades, each about three stories in height, were arranged to form a mock street known as the "Strada Novissima," with gallery spaces behind that were staged with photographs, drawings, and models of projects by the architect of the facade. Many of the architects were engaged with an exploration of historical motifs and associated with the Postmodern movement in architecture, which emerged as a response to architectural Modernism. The exhibition later traveled to Paris, France in 1981, then to San Francisco, California in 1982.

== Venice Exhibition (1980) ==
The following twenty architects or architecture firms were commissioned to design facades and gallery spaces for the Strada Novissima at the 1980 Venice Biennale:

- Ricardo Bofill (Spain)
- Constantio Dardi (Italy)
- Frank Gehry (USA)
- Michael Graves (USA)
- Allan Greenberg (USA)
- Hans Hollein (Austria)
- Arata Isozaki (Japan)
- Joseph-Paul Kleihues (West Germany)
- Rem Koolhass/Elia Zenghelis (OMA) (England)
- Leon Krier (England)
- Charles Moore (USA)
- Paolo Portoghesi (Italy) - also exhibition curator
- Franco Purini/Laura Thermes (Italy)
- Massimo Scolari (Italy)
- Thomas Gordon Smith (USA)
- Robert A.M. Stern (USA)
- Studio G.R.A.U. (Italy)
- Stanley Tigerman (USA)
- Oswald Mathias Ungers (West Germany)
- Venturi, Rauch & Scott Brown (USA).

In addition to the twenty facades, architect Aldo Rossi also designed an Entry Gate and floating theater known as the "Teatro del Mondo" which floated along the Venice canals. Architect and critic Charles Jencks designed a small pencil-shaped pavilion known as the "Critic's Corner Pencil."

== Paris Exhibition (1981) ==
The exhibition was installed in the Chapel of Saint-Louis-de-la-Salpetriere in Paris in 1981 and two facades were added by French architects Christian de Portzamparc and Fernando Montes.

== San Francisco Exhibition (1982) ==
San Franciscans Virginia Westover, a public relations consultant, and Joseph Weiner, a real estate developer, visited the exhibition in Venice and organized the "Friends of the Biennale" to raise money to bring the exhibit to San Francisco to introduce Postmodern architecture to the wider public. When the exhibition was shipped to San Francisco and installed in a pier at Fort Mason Center, nineteen of the original twenty Venice facades were reinstalled, along with the two Paris facades, and four new facades by Bay Area architects. The facade by Venturi, Rauch & Scott Brown was not included in the San Francisco exhibition and was replaced by a gallery of work by architect Philip Johnson.

The four new San Francisco facades were by:

- Andrew Batey & Mark Mack (Batey & Mack) - also in charge of the exhibition's design and conception at Fort Mason Center
- Daniel Solomon
- William Turnbull
- Marc Goldstein, Jared Carlin, Michael Chow, and Richard Tobias of SOM.

In addition to the facades that comprised the Strada Novissima, Thomas Gordon Smith designed a "Sponsor's Pavilion" and Batey & Mack designed the "Italian Marketplace" which included four local food purveyors. A design competition was sponsored for an entry gate outside of the pier building which was won by Donald A. Crosby of Bay Area firm Crosby Thornton Marshall Associates. Graphic design for the San Francisco exhibition was done by the local firm, Thomas Ingalls + Associates, and the installation at Fort Mason Center was photographed by Richard Sexton.

=== In popular culture ===
The official exhibition poster for the San Francisco installation was featured in the film Breathless (1983) in the apartment of one of the main characters, who was an architecture student.
