= The Book of Folly =

Book by Anne Sexton

- First edition
- Author: Anne Sexton
- Language: English
- Genre: Poetry
- Publisher: Houghton Mifflin
- Publication date: 1972
- Publication place: United States
- Pages: 105
- ISBN: 0395140145
- Dewey Decimal: 811/.54
- LC Class: PS3537.E915 B6, PS3537.E915B6

The Book of Folly is a 1972 collection of poetry by American writer Anne Sexton. It is devised into three sections: "Thirty Poems" and "The Jesus Papers".

== Contents ==
=== Thirty Poems ===
- "The Ambition Bird"
- "The Doctor of the Heart"
- "Oh"
- "Sweeney"
- "Mother and Daughter"
- "The Wifebeater"
- "The Firebombers"
- "The One-Legged Man"
- "The Assassin"
- "Going Gone"
- "Anna Who Was Mad"
- "The Hex"
- "Dreaming the Breasts"
- "The Red Shoes"
- "The Other"
- "The Silence"
- "The Hoarder"
- "Killing the Spring"
- "The Death of Fathers"
- "Angels of the Love Affair"

"The Death of Fathers" consists of six poems: "Oysters", "How We Danced", "The Boat", "Santa", "Friends", and "Begat".

"Angels of the Love Affair" also consists of six poems: "Angel of Fire and Genitals", "Angel of Clean Sheets", "Angel of Flight and Sleigh Bells", "Angel of Hope and Calendars", "Angel of Blizzards and Blackouts", and "Angel of Beach Houses and Picnics".

=== The Jesus Papers ===
- "Jesus Suckles"
- "Jesus Awake"
- "Jesus Asleep"
- "Jesus Raised Up the Harlot"
- "Jesus Cooks"
- "Jesus Summons Forth"
- "Jesus Dies"
- "Jesus Unborn"
- "The Author of the Jesus Papers Speaks"
