= Thomas Sexton =

Thomas or Tom Sexton may refer to:

- Tom Sexton (cyclist) (born 1998), New Zealand cyclist
- Thomas Sexton (Irish politician) (1848–1932), Irish journalist, financial expert, nationalist politician and Member of Parliament
- Thomas Sexton (English politician) (1879–1946), Labour Party politician in England, MP 1935–1945
- Tom Sexton (poet) (born 1940), Alaskan poet and scholar
- Tom Sexton (baseball) (1865–1934), American Major League Baseball player
- Tom Sexton (rugby union) (born 1989), rugby union player
