= Linda Gray Sexton =

American writer (born 1953)

Linda Gray Sexton (born 1953) is an American writer, novelist, and memoirist. She is the daughter of Pulitzer Prize-winning poet Anne Sexton and is known for her work exploring mental health, suicide, family relationships, and the literary legacy of her mother. In addition to publishing both fiction and non-fiction, she has edited posthumous collections of Anne Sexton's writings and authored memoirs that reflect on her own experiences with depression and survival.

== Early life ==
She was born in Newton, Massachusetts, the elder daughter of poet Anne Sexton and Alfred Muller "Kayo" Sexton. She graduated from Harvard College in 1975.

Sexton has spoken about the intense emotional environment of her upbringing, marked by her mother’s struggles with mental illness and poetry. She has said that writing became a way to process trauma and preserve memory, particularly in the wake of her mother's suicide when she was 21.

== Career ==
In March 1994, she wrote her memoirs of growing up with her mother, titled Searching for Mercy Street: My Journey Back to My Mother, Anne Sexton. The book was originally published by Little, Brown and later reissued by Counterpoint Press in April 2011. Michiko Kakutani, reviewing it, wrote "while Anne Sexton often comes across as a truly monstrous mother, there are also passages of great tenderness in this book ... she writes with compelling urgency and candor".

The book was recognized as a New York Times Notable Book of the Year and was selected as an Editor’s Choice. It was also optioned by Miramax Films, with reports that Martin Scorsese showed interest in the project. Her 1988 novel Points of Light was adapted into a Hallmark Hall of Fame television movie for Mother’s Day, starring Marlo Thomas.

Linda Gray Sexton has written several novels and edited posthumous editions of her mother's works. She wrote another memoir, Half in Love: Surviving the Legacy of Suicide, published in 2011, and Erica Jong has written "Linda Sexton’s beautiful book is a cry for health and sanity. It will bring hope and understanding because it explains the way suicide blights families from generation to generation."

In a 2011 interview, she described herself as a “holder of hope,” using her story to help others find resilience in the face of mental illness. Her often deeply personal writing bridges fiction and memoir, and she has spoken about how writing is both a form of healing and of bearing witness.

Sexton has written book reviews for The New York Times Book Review, The Chicago Tribune, and The Los Angeles Times. Her work has been included in literary lists and essays that explore the complexities of mother-daughter relationships, notably referenced in The Guardian's “Top 10 stories about mothers and daughters.” In 2014, she published Bespotted: My Family’s Love Affair with Thirty-Eight Dalmatians, a memoir blending humor and reflection to explore the eccentricities and healing role of animals in her family.

== Bibliography ==
- Anne Sexton: A Self-Portrait in Letters (with Lois Ames, 1977) – nonfiction
- Between Two Worlds: Young Women in Crisis (1979) – nonfiction
- Rituals (1982) – novel
- Mirror Images (1985) – novel
- Points of Light (1988) – novel
- Private Acts (1991) – novel
- Searching for Mercy Street: My Journey Back to My Mother, Anne Sexton (1994; reissued 2011) – memoir
- Half in Love: Surviving the Legacy of Suicide (2011) – memoir
- Bespotted: My Family’s Love Affair with Thirty-Eight Dalmatians (2014) – memoir
