= Anne Sexton =

American poet (1928–1974)

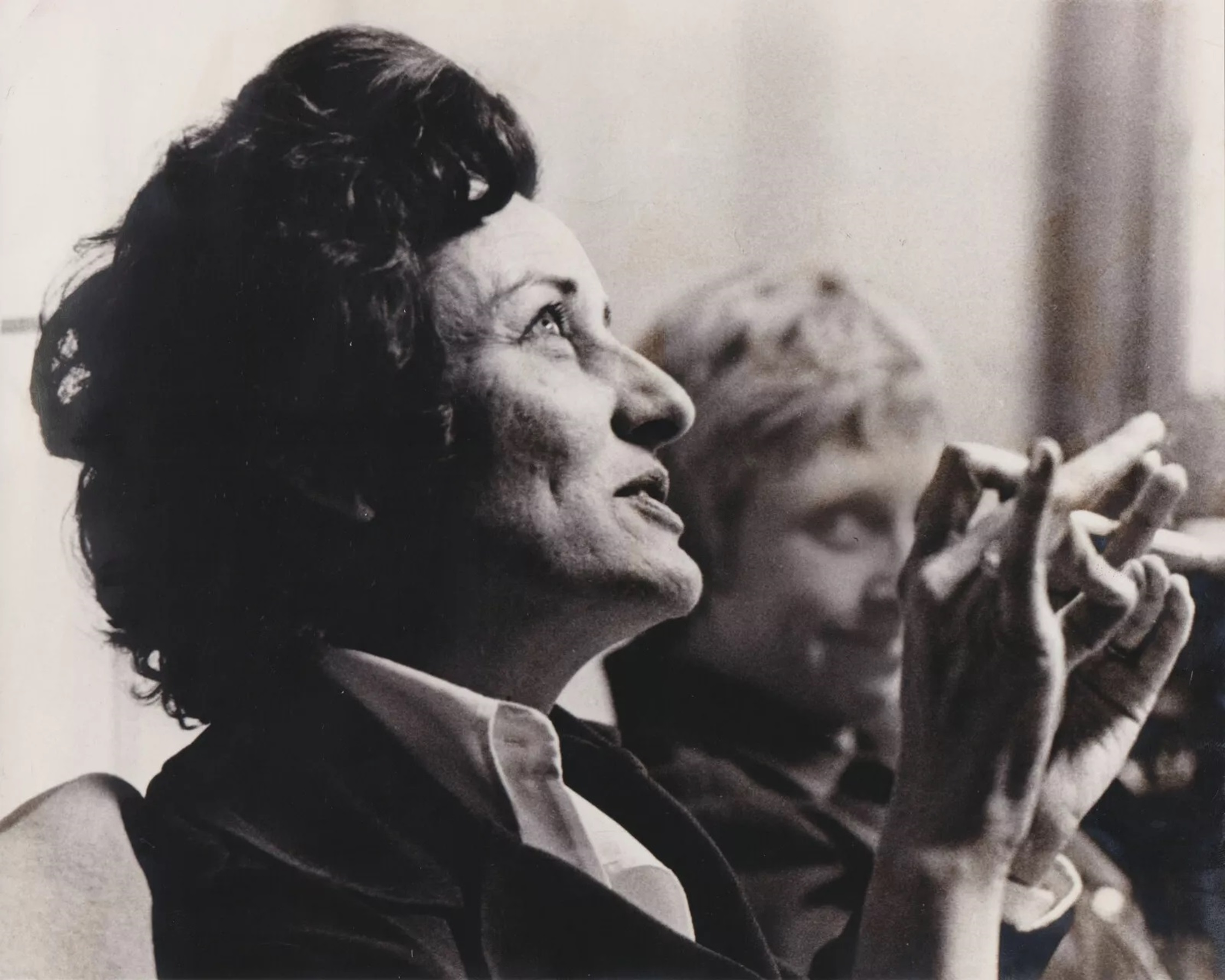
- Sexton at Boston University
- Born: Anne Gray Harvey; November 9, 1928; Newton, Massachusetts, U.S.
- Died: October 4, 1974 (aged 45); Weston, Massachusetts, U.S.
- Education: Boston University
- Occupation: Poet
- Spouse: Alfred Sexton (1948–1973)
- Children: 2, including Linda Gray Sexton
- Writing career
- Movement: Confessional poetry

Anne Sexton (born Anne Gray Harvey; November 9, 1928 – October 4, 1974) was an American poet known for her highly personal, confessional verse. She won the Pulitzer Prize for poetry in 1967 for her book Live or Die. Her poetry often drew on her experiences with mental illness, including bipolar disorder and suicidal ideation, as well as aspects of her personal life. She was known for blending fairy tales, mythology, and religious imagery with autobiographical themes. Sexton’s work continues to be widely read and studied for its emotional intensity and lasting influence on contemporary American poetry. After her death, one of her daughters has alleged abuse in accounts discussed in some later biographies and scholarship.

== Early life and family ==
Anne Sexton was born Anne Gray Harvey in Newton, Massachusetts, to Mary Gray (Staples) Harvey (1901–1959) and Ralph Churchill Harvey (1900–1959). She had two older sisters, Jane Elizabeth (Harvey) Jealous (1923–1983) and Blanche Dingley (Harvey) Taylor (1925–2011). She spent most of her childhood in Boston. It is known that Sexton's parents were often abusive.

In 1945 she enrolled at Rogers Hall boarding school in Lowell, Massachusetts, later spending a year at Garland School. She lived with her great aunt 'Nanna' whom Sexton considered her "greatest confidante", though she was also institutionalised. For a time she modeled for Boston's Hart Agency. On August 16, 1948, she married Alfred Muller Sexton II and they remained together until 1973. Sexton had her first child, Linda Gray Sexton, in 1953. Her second child, Joyce Ladd Sexton, was born two years later. Shortly after, she had her first breakdown and was admitted to a neuropsychiatric hospital. She continued to suffer with her mental health for the remainder of her life.

== Poetry ==
After giving birth to her daughter Linda in 1953, Sexton started to suffer from postpartum depression and symptoms of bipolar disorder which was diagnosed in 1954. After the birth of her second daughter, Joy, in 1955, her postpartum depression worsened and she attempted suicide for the first time, which resulted in her being institutionalised in Westwood Lodge in 1956. There, she met Dr Martin Orne, who became her psychiatrist for the next 8 years. He suggested that she write poetry as an outlet for her struggles, telling her 'You can't kill yourself; you have something to give. Why, if people read your poems' [...] they would think, "There's somebody else like me!" They wouldn't feel alone.' Between January and December 1957, Sexton brought Orne 60 poems.

In 1957, Sexton attended her first communal poetry workshop at the Boston Centre for Adult Education run by John Holmes. She felt great trepidation about attending the class as she felt she was incomparable to many there as she had no formal training in poetry; she called a friend and asked her to come with her. To Sexton's surprise, a number of her poems were accepted by magazines like Saturday Review, Harper’s Magazine and The New Yorker, including the poem "Sunbathers" which featured in The New Yorker's June 13, 1959 issue. In the fall of 1958, Sexton began attending Robert Lowell's poetry seminar held at Boston University where she met him and later Sylvia Plath and George Starbuck in 1959.

Sexton’s first poetry collection, To Bedlam and Part Way Back, was published in 1960, and explored the taboos surrounding mental illness. An extensive collection along with the poem "Her Kind" was published, exploring the vilification and oppression women faced through the image of witches.

Sexton and Plath's relationship was short-lived due to Plath's death in 1963. Lowell observed, when they were both in his class, that they could benefit from one and other, “the tightly controlled Plath could benefit from Sexton's "looseness." When Plath died, Sexton expressed profound feelings of grief, jealousy and betrayal to Orne, saying "Sylvia's death disturbs me. Makes me want it too. She took something that was mine, that death was mine! Of course it was hers too. But we both swore off it, the way you swear off smoking." To honour their friendship, Sexton wrote 'Sylvia's Death', which was first published in 1963 in TriQuarterly magazine, before being published in her Pulitzer Prize-winning collection, Live or Die, in 1966.

Sexton's poetic career was encouraged by her mentor W. D. Snodgrass, whom she met at the Antioch Writer's Conference in 1957. His poem "Heart's Needle" proved inspirational for her in its theme of separation from his three-year-old daughter. Sexton first read the poem at a time when her own young daughter was living with her mother-in-law. She, in turn, wrote "The Double Image", a poem which explores the multi-generational relationship between mother and daughter. She began writing letters to Snodgrass and they became friends.

While working with John Holmes, Sexton encountered Maxine Kumin. They became good friends and remained so for the rest of Sexton's life. Kumin and Sexton rigorously critiqued each other's work and wrote four children's books together. In the late 1960s, the manic elements of Sexton's illness began to affect her career, though she still wrote and published work and gave readings of her poetry. She collaborated with musicians, forming a jazz-rock group called Her Kind that added music to her poetry. Her play Mercy Street, starring Marian Seldes, was produced in 1969 after several years of revisions. Sexton also collaborated with the artist Barbara Swan, who illustrated several of her books.

Within 12 years of writing her first sonnet, she was among the most honored poets in the U.S.: a Pulitzer Prize winner, a fellow of the Royal Society of Literature and the first female member of the Harvard chapter of Phi Beta Kappa.[18][19]

== Death ==
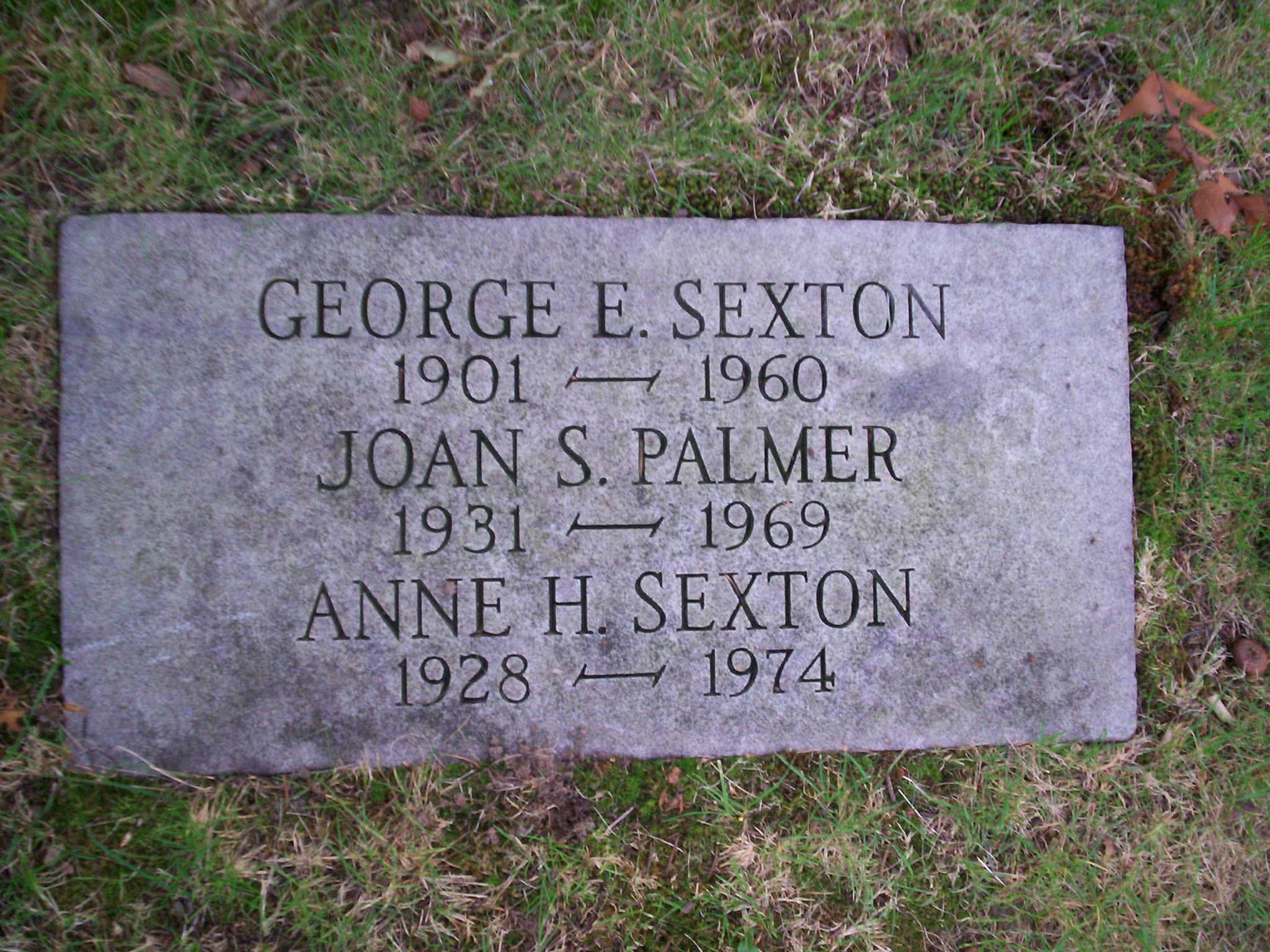
Grave of Anne Sexton, located at Forest Hills Cemetery in Jamaica Plain, Massachusetts

On October 4, 1974, Sexton had lunch with Kumin to revise galleys for Sexton's manuscript of The Awful Rowing Toward God, scheduled for publication in March 1975 (Middlebrook 396). Later that day, she committed suicide at the age of 45.

In an interview over a year before her death, she explained she had written the first drafts of The Awful Rowing Toward God in 20 days with "two days out for despair and three days out in a mental hospital." She went on to say that she would not allow the poems to be published before her death.

Her funeral was at St. Paul's Church in Dedham, Massachusetts. She is buried at Forest Hills Cemetery & Crematory in Jamaica Plain, Boston, Massachusetts.

== Content and themes of work ==
Sexton is seen as the modern model of the confessional poet due to the intimate and emotional content of her poetry. Sexton often wrote about her struggles with mental illness. Topics regarded at the time as obscene and repulsive, especially when referred to by women often appeared in her verse. "She wrote openly about menstruation, abortion, masturbation, incest, adultery, and drug addiction at a time when the proprieties embraced none of these as proper topics for poetry." wrote Maxine Kumin in. They met at a poetry workshop in Boston in 1957. Sexton was one of the many poets who popularised confessional poetry. Sexton's poetry was described as "unflinching in the way it dealt with mental illness, a subject not often discussed in "polite society"".

Although Sexton was labelled as a confessional poet, she described herself as a "storyteller", "who understood the difference between poetic and literal truth". This illustrates to her audience that, Sexton does use her own personal experiences and pain, she also makes the experience subjective, and transforms it into an art. This can be seen in all of her poetry, but more specifically 'Letter Written on a Ferry Whilst Crossing Long Island Sound'.

Despite society's reservations about discussing these taboo topics that appear in Sexton's work, she continued on to write about these taboos, and her third book "Live or Die" - which was based on her journey of recovery from mental illness - was awarded the Pulitzer Prize. This emphasises how Sexton was such a transformative poet, as she helped shaped and transform confessional poetry.

It could be said that Sexton used poetry to try to handle her depression, breakdowns, and her complex relationships, which is precisely what makes her work so eye-opening and gripping. Initially, it was her psychiatrist who encouraged her to utilise poetry as a coping mechanism to purge her feelings. This suggestion led to the creation of "You, Doctor Martin", which highlights her experiences in a psychiatric hospital.

Sexton's relationship and work with Sylvia Plath and Robert Lowell is also noteworthy, as she studied alongside Plath and Lowell at Boston University, which ultimately had an impact on her writing. This is particularly interesting, as Plath and Sexton may have been seen as opposites in their writing styles, as Sexton was more instinctual, whereas Plath was more trained and intensely crafted. Despite their differences, the three had an impact on one another and their poetry, which leaves the question of mutual influence. Sexton's content was definitely impacted by this trio, however it was stronger between the two women, as both poets shared the experience of mental health illnesses, and the struggles of motherhood.

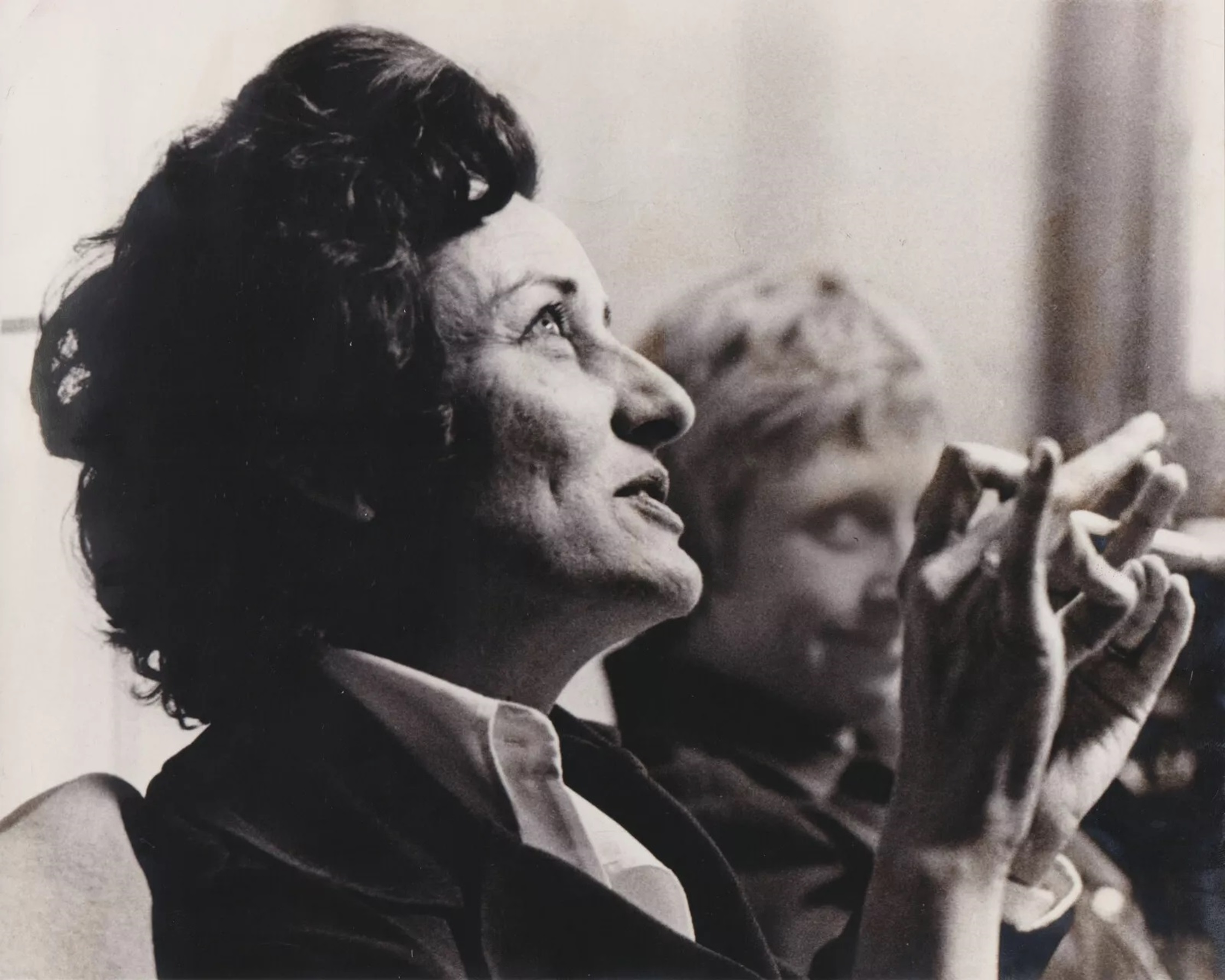
Sexton at Boston University where she taught poetry

Sexton's work towards the end of the 1960s has been criticized as "preening, lazy and flip" by otherwise respectful critics. Some critics regard her alcoholism as compromising her last work. However, other critics see Sexton as a poet whose writing matured over time. "Starting as a relatively conventional writer, she learned to roughen up her line ... to use as an instrument against the 'politesse' of language, politics, religion [and] sex."

Her eighth collection of poetry is entitled The Awful Rowing Toward God. The title came from her meeting with a Roman Catholic priest who, unwilling to administer last rites, told her "God is in your typewriter." This gave the poet the desire and willpower to continue living and writing. The Awful Rowing Toward God and The Death Notebooks are among her final works, and both center on the theme of dying.

Her work started out as being about herself, however as her career progressed she made periodic attempts to reach outside the realm of her own life for poetic themes. Transformations (1971), which is a re-visionary re-telling of Grimm's Fairy Tales, is one such book.

(Transformations was used as the libretto for the 1973 opera of the same name by American composer Conrad Susa.) Later she used Christopher Smart's Jubilate Agno and the Bible as the basis for some of her work.

Much has been made of the tangled threads of her writing, her life, and her depression, much in the same way as with Sylvia Plath's suicide in 1963. Robert Lowell, Adrienne Rich, and Denise Levertov commented in separate obituaries on the role of creativity in Sexton's death. Levertov says, "We who are alive must make clear, as she could not, the distinction between creativity and self-destruction."

== Subsequent controversy ==
Following one of many suicide attempts and manic or depressive episodes, Sexton worked with therapist Martin Orne. He diagnosed her with what is now described as bipolar disorder, but his competence to do so is called into question by his early use of allegedly unsound psychotherapeutic techniques. During sessions with Sexton, he used hypnosis and sodium pentothal to recover supposedly repressed memories. During this process, he allegedly used suggestion to uncover memories of having been abused by her father. This abuse was disputed in interviews with her mother and other relatives.

Orne wrote that hypnosis in an adult frequently does not present accurate memories of childhood; instead, "adults under hypnosis are not literally reliving their early childhoods but presenting them through the prisms of adulthood." According to Orne, Sexton was extremely suggestible and would mimic the symptoms of the patients around her in the mental hospitals to which she was committed. Diane Middlebrook's biography states that a separate personality named Elizabeth emerged in Sexton while under hypnosis. Orne did not encourage this development and subsequently this "alternate personality" disappeared. Orne eventually concluded that Anne Sexton was suffering from hysteria.

During the writing of the Middlebrook biography, her daughter, Linda Gray Sexton, stated that she had been sexually assaulted by her mother. In 1994, she published her autobiography Searching for Mercy Street: My Journey Back to My Mother, Anne Sexton, which includes her own accounts of the abuse.

Middlebrook published her controversial biography of Anne Sexton with the approval of daughter Linda, Anne's literary executor. For use in the biography, Orne had given Diane Middlebrook most of the tapes recording the therapy sessions between Orne and Anne Sexton. The use of these tapes was met with, as The New York Times put it, "thunderous condemnation". Middlebrook received the tapes after she had written a substantial amount of the first draft of Sexton's biography, and decided to start over. Although Linda Gray Sexton collaborated with the Middlebrook biography, other members of the Sexton family were divided over the book, publishing several editorials and op-ed pieces in The New York Times and The New York Times Book Review.

Controversy continued with the posthumous public release of the tapes (which had been subject to doctor-patient confidentiality). They are said to reveal Sexton's molestation of her daughter Linda, her physically violent behavior toward both her daughters, and her physical altercations with her husband.

Further controversy surrounds allegations that she had an "affair with" the therapist who replaced Orne in the 1960s.

No action was taken to censure or discipline the second therapist. Orne considered the "affair" with the second therapist (given the pseudonym "Ollie Zweizung" by Middlebrook and Linda Sexton) to be the catalyst that eventually resulted in her suicide. Coverage of the book's release names the second therapist as Dr. Frederick J. Duhl. When questioned, he declined to comment, citing concerns over his medical license.

== Legacy ==
Peter Gabriel dedicated his song "Mercy Street" (named for her play Mercy Street and inspired by his reading of her poem "45 Mercy Street") from his 1986 album So to Sexton. She has been described as a "personal touchstone" for Morrissey, former lead singer and lyricist of The Smiths. American composer David Conte set "Rowing," "Her Kind," "Ringing the Bells," "Riding the Elevator to the Sky," and "Us" in his cycle "Sexton Songs." She is commemorated on the Boston Women's Heritage Trail.

== Bibliography ==
=== Poetry ===
- To Bedlam and Part Way Back (1960)
- All My Pretty Ones (1962)
- Live or Die (1966)
- Love Poems (1969)
- Transformations (1971)
- The Book of Folly (1972)
- The Death Notebooks (1974)
- The Awful Rowing Toward God (1975)
- 45 Mercy Street (1976)
- Words for Dr. Y.: Uncollected Poems (1978)
- The Complete Poems: Anne Sexton (1981)

=== Prose ===
- Anne Sexton: A Self-Portrait in Letters (1977)
