= Live or Die (poetry collection) =

1966 poetry collection by Anne Sexton

- Author: Anne Sexton
- Language: English
- Genre: Poetry
- Publisher: Houghton Mifflin
- Publication date: September 16, 1966
- Publication place: United States
- Pages: 90
- Awards: 1967 Pulitzer Prize
- ISBN: 0395081807
- Dewey Decimal: 811.54
- LC Class: PS3537.E915 L5

Live or Die is a collection of poetry by American poet Anne Sexton, published in 1966. Many of the poems in the collection are in free verse, though some are in rhyme. The poems, written between 1962 and 1966, are arranged in the book in chronological order. Their subjects are Sexton's troubled relationships with her mother and her daughters, and her treatment for mental illness.

The collection includes the poems "And One for My Dame", "Sylvia's Death", "Consorting With Angels" and "Wanting to Die". The book won the 1967 Pulitzer Prize for Poetry.
