= Richard Sexton =

American photographer (born 1954)

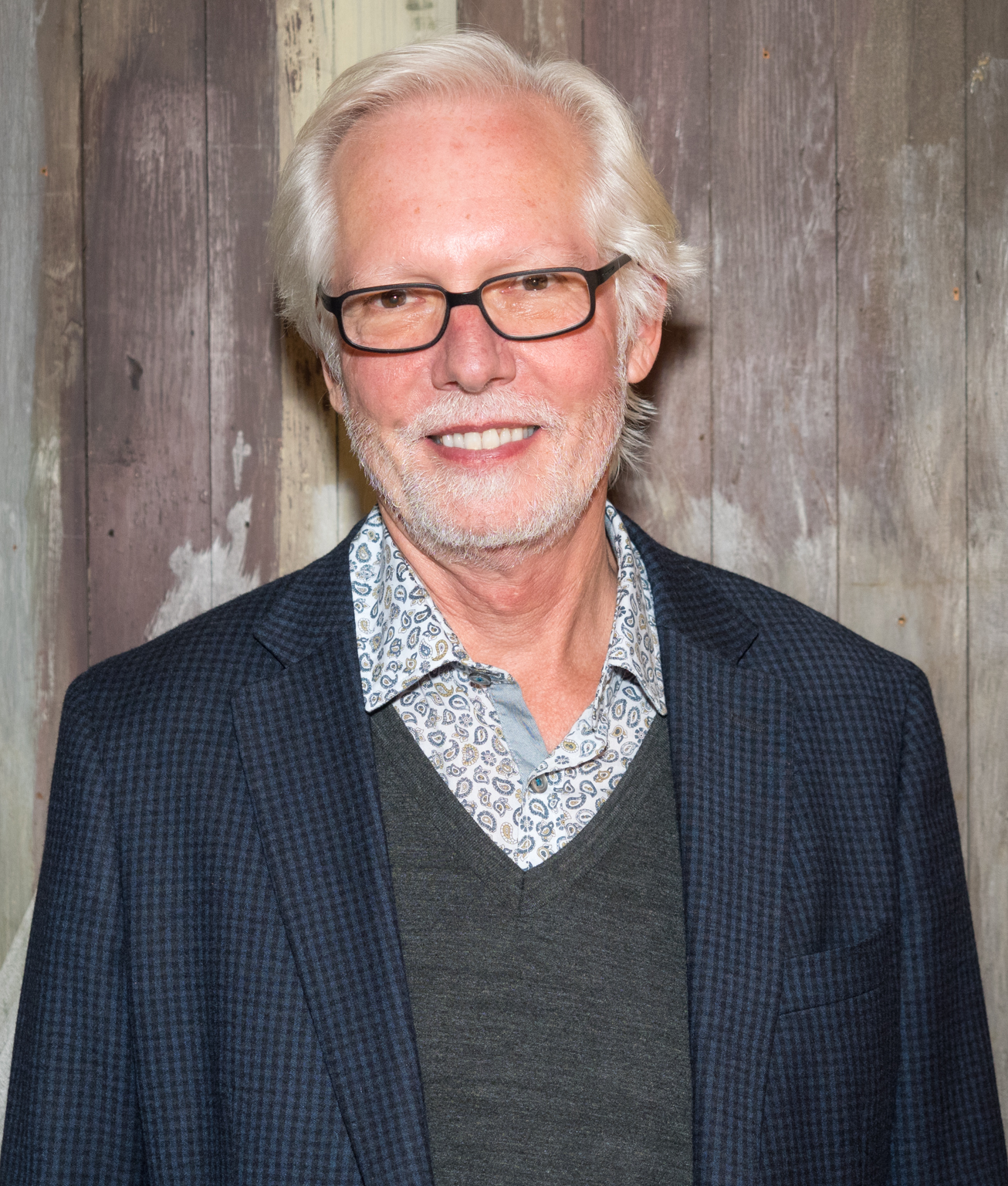
- Richard Sexton in 2014
- Born: Atlanta, Georgia
- Education: Emory University, San Francisco Art Institute
- Known for: Architectural Photography

Richard Sexton (born 1954) is an American photographer, author, teacher, and architectural critic with a studio based in New Orleans, Louisiana. He is best known for his architectural photography publications and exhibitions, which have been shown internationally. Sexton was born in 1954 in Atlanta, Georgia, and currently resides in both New Orleans, Louisiana, and Walton County, Florida.

== Career ==
Sexton began photographing as an undergraduate at Emory University. After graduating from Emory in 1975, he moved to San Francisco and enrolled in classes at the San Francisco Art Institute. In 1982, Sexton photographed "The Presence of the Past" architectural exhibition at Fort Mason Center. Sexton's first photographic book project, American Style: Classic Product Design from Airstream to Zippo, was published by Chronicle Books in 1987. Sexton's second book, The Cottage Book, documented the tradition of cottage living in the San Francisco Bay area. He was featured in a 1989 New York Times article on the expanding cottage architecture trend. Collaborating with architectural historian Randolph Delehanty, Sexton also authored In the Victorian Style, about San Francisco's domestic Victorian architecture.

Sexton moved to New Orleans, Louisiana, in 1991, where he worked with Delehanty on New Orleans: Elegance and Decadence, a photo essay about the interiors, furnishings, and gardens of New Orleans creatives with captions connecting them to New Orleans’ history. In 1997, Sexton curated the exhibit Sidney Bechet: A World of Jazz 1897-1997 for the Bechet Centennial Committee, which commemorated the centennial of jazz musician Sidney Bechet's birth.

Sexton's Terra Incognita, a monograph of Gulf Coast landscapes, received critical acclaim, including a 2008 award from Louisiana Cultural Vistas magazine and a review in the Village Voice. Terra Incognita was accompanied by a traveling exhibit, which was displayed at the Ogden Museum of Southern Art, the Walter Anderson Museum of Art, the Polk Museum of Art, the Southeast Museum of Photography, and the Pensacola Museum of Art.

Additionally, Sexton's book New Roads and Old Rivers was named "The New Must-Have Coffee Table Book" in August 2012 by Southern Living's The Daily South blog.

In February 2014, Sexton published his twelfth book, Creole World: Photographs of New Orleans and the Latin Caribbean Sphere. The book received favorable reviews in the New York Review of Books, Wall Street Journal, Times-Picayune, Advocate, and News-Star, as well as in Garden & Gun magazine's Daily Shot blog. Creole World was also shown as an exhibit at the Historic New Orleans Collection before traveling to museums in Miami, FL, and Shreveport and Lafayette, LA.

In 2018, the Historic New Orleans Collection (HNOC) published Sexton's photography project Enigmatic Stream: Industrial Landscapes of the Lower Mississippi River as a book, with accompanying essays from Paul Schneider and John H. Lawrence. In conjunction with the book's publication, the HNOC also featured an accompanying exhibit of Sexton's 100 black and white images from the project.

Sexton's photographs are included in the collections at the High Museum of Art, Historic New Orleans Collection, New Orleans Museum of Art, Ogden Museum of Southern Art, Polk Museum of Art,LSU Museum of Art, and the Frost Art Museum. Sexton's work has appeared in Archetype, Abitare, Harper's, Louisiana Cultural Vistas, Louisiana Lens, Oxford American, Smithsonian Magazine, Photographer's Forum, Preservation magazine, Southern Accents magazine, and View Camera.

Sexton also taught photography at the New Orleans Academy of Fine Arts and at the Academy of Art College in San Francisco.

== Awards ==
- Overall Excellence Award from the Southeast Library Association, for Creole World: Photographs of New Orleans and the Latin Caribbean Sphere, by Richard Sexton, with essays by Jay D. Edwards and John H. Lawrence, 2016
- Michael P. Smith Award for Documentary Photography, Louisiana Endowment for the Humanities, Feb. 2014
- Joseph Arrigo Book of the Year Award, New Orleans-Gulf South Booksellers Association, for Gardens of New Orleans: Exquisite Excess, by Lake Douglas and Jeannette Hardy, with photographs by Richard Sexton, 2001
- "50 People to Watch," New Orleans Magazine and WWL radio, New Orleans, LA 1994
- Award of Merit for New Orleans: Elegance and Decadence, Rounce & Coffin Club, Los Angeles, CA 1994

== Books ==
- American Style: Classic Product Design from Airstream to Zippo (1987)
- The Cottage Book (1989)
- In the Victorian Style, with Randolph Delehanty (1991)
- New Orleans: Elegance and Decadence, with Randolph Delehanty (1993)
- Parallel Utopias: The Quest for Community, with contributing essays by William Turnbull Jr. and Ray Oldenburg (1995)
- Vestiges of Grandeur: The Plantations of Louisiana's River Road (1999)
- Gardens of New Orleans: Exquisite Excess (2000)
- Rosemary Beach (2007)
- Terra Incognita: Photographs of America's Third Coast (2007)
- Destrehan: The Man, The House, The Legacy (2008)
- New Roads and Old Rivers: Louisiana's Historic Pointe Coupee Parish (2012)
- Creole World: Photographs of New Orleans and the Latin Caribbean Sphere (2014)
- Enigmatic Stream: Industrial Landscapes of the Lower Mississippi River (2018)
- 74; M4; Latin America: a year, a camera, a road trip (2023)
- New Orleans: A Photo Guide to the Wild Melange (2024)
