= John Holmes (poet) =

American poet

John Holmes (January 6, 1904 – June 22, 1962), born John Albert Holmes Jr., was a poet and critic. He was born in Somerville, Massachusetts, and both attended and taught at Tufts University where he was a professor of literature and modern poetry for 28 years. He wrote several volumes of poetry and the lyrics to several Unitarian Universalist hymns., including "The People's Peace". He taught John Ciardi and Anne Sexton.

== Early years ==
Holmes was born in Somerville, Massachusetts, son of John A. Holmes, Sr. and Mary Florence (Murdock) Holmes. His father was an engineer who specialized in building dams and bridges. John attended Somerville public schools.

== Professional life ==
In 1934 he became an instructor at Tufts. He worked there the rest of his life, rising to full professor in 1960. Holmes's students admired him. "When he taught," wrote Jerome Barron, "something magical happened. He made you want to write and understand poetry. He didn't lecture; he encouraged. Simplicity, and writing that went from the inside out, this is what he was after."

== His works ==
Holmes wrote several volumes of poetry:

Along the Row (1929)

Address to the Living (1937)

Fair Warning (1939)

The Poet's Word (1939)

Map of my Country (1943)

Little Treasury of Love Poems (1950)

The Double Root (1950)

The Symbols (1955)

Writing poetry (1960)

The Fortune Teller (1961)
