= Joseph Sexton (horticulturist) =

American horticulturalist (1842–1917)

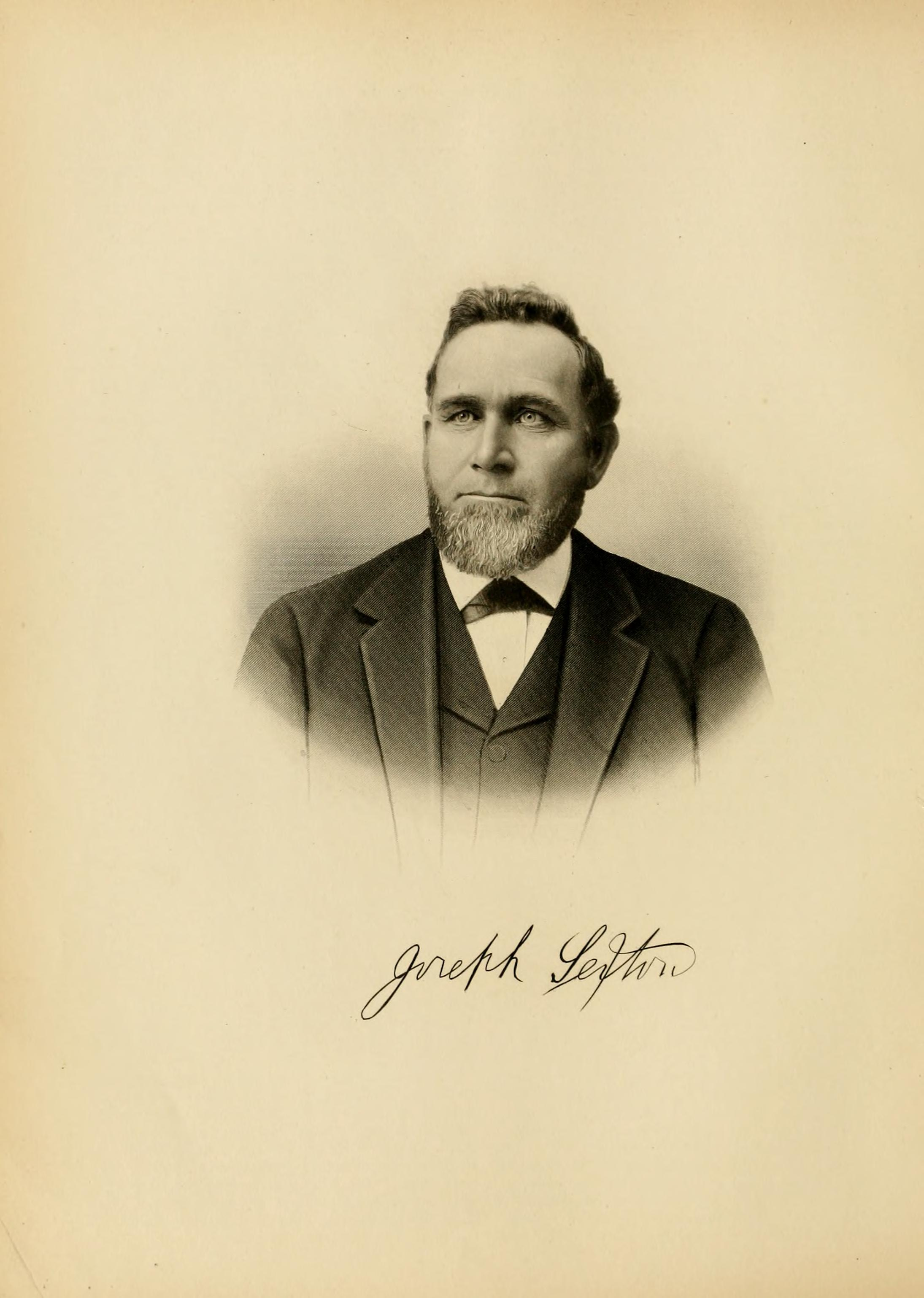
- Born: 1842; Ohio
- Died: August 17, 1917 (aged 74–75)
- Occupation: Horticulturist

Joseph Sexton (1842 – August 17, 1917) was an American horticulturist from Ohio who planted thousands of seedling avocado trees in Santa Barbara, California. He and his wife, Lucy Foster Sexton, built and lived in the Sexton House in Goleta, California.

== General references ==
- Guinn, James Miller (1902). "Joseph Sexton". Historical and biographical record of southern California; containing a history of southern California from its earliest settlement to the opening year of the twentieth century. Chicago: Chapman publishing company. pp. 263–264.
