= List of chief music critics =

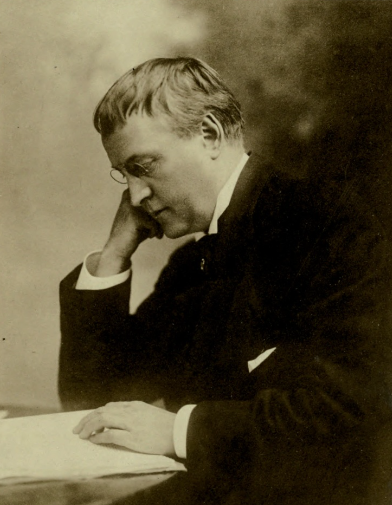
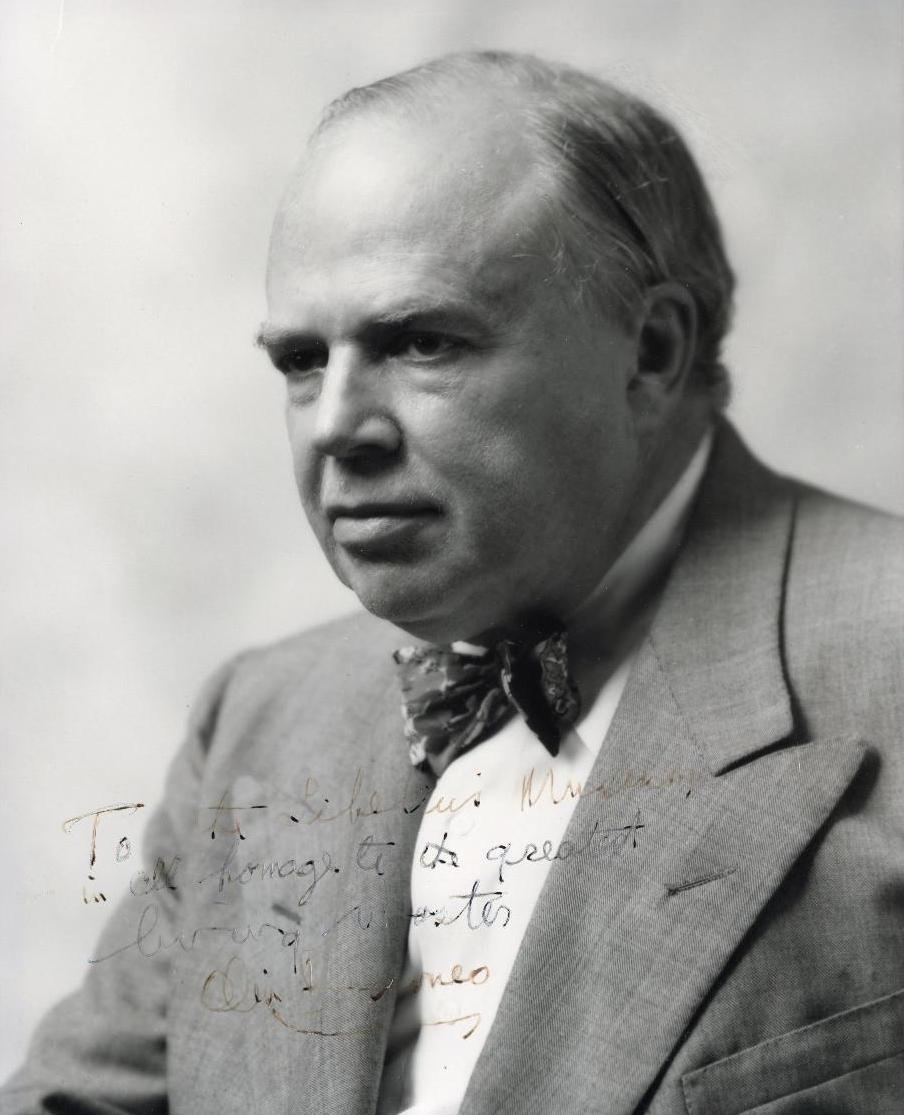
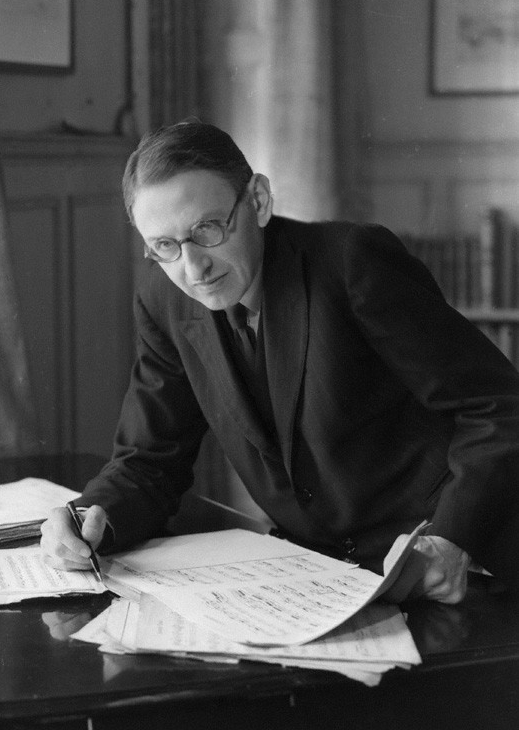
Leading critics of the late 19th and early 20th centuries, clockwise, from left to right:
- Henry Theophilus Finck in 1913
- Ernest Newman, c. 1905
- Eric Blom in 1942
- Olin Downes, in c. 1950

Western classical music has a substantial history of music criticism, and many individuals have established careers as music critics. However, concert reviews are not always credited in the daily and weekly newspapers, especially those in the early to mid-20th century. This selective list of chief music critics (or equivalent title, influence or status) aims to make it easier to find the likely author of a review, or at least the influence of the chief music critic on what was covered and how.

Journalistic newspaper criticism of Western music did not properly emerge until the 1840s. Before then, in England, Joseph Addison had contributed essays on music to The Spectator in Handel's era: his famous attacks on the Italian Baroque opera were published in March and April 1711.

Former opera impresario Willian Ayrton began writing occasional musical criticism for The Morning Chronicle (1813–26) and The Examiner (1837–51) and founded the monthly music journal The Harmonicon in 1823. Arts and literary magazines such as The Athenæum (and its critic H F Chorley, writing from 1830 to 1868) sometimes covered musical topics. Specialist music paper The Musical World began publication in 1836 and The Musical Times in 1844. In France, the composer Hector Berlioz wrote reviews and criticisms for the Paris press of the 1830s and 1840s, as did other French writers such as Gérard de Nerval and François-Joseph Fétis. In Germany, Robert Schumann began giving influential reviews for the Neue Zeitschrift für Musik in the 1830s. In Austria, Ludwig Rellstab established himself as (according to Max Graf) "the first great music critic".

But The Morning Post in England was the first daily newspaper to regularly publish concert reports, while The Times is generally recognised as being the first to appoint a professionally competent music critic, J W Davidson, in 1846. It has been suggested that critic and librettist Joseph Bennett, writing for The Daily Telegraph from 1870 (then claimed to have the largest circulation in the world), held back the progress of English music due to his antipathy to Wagner, leaving Bernard Shaw as the only modern critic in the UK in the late eighties and early nineties. Throughout the mid-to-late 1800s Eduard Hanslick became a leading figure in Austria, writing for the Neue Freie Presse.

The presence of music criticism continued to grow, and by the 20th century numerous major newspapers had joined The Morning Post and Times in establishing permanent music critic posts, including The Daily Telegraph, The Guardian, The Observer and The Sunday Times in Britain, and the Chicago Tribune, New York Herald Tribune and The New York Times in America. The late 19th and early 20th century saw the development of a uniquely American school of criticism, inaugurated by an informal group of New York-based writers, termed the 'Old Guard', which included Richard Aldrich, Henry Theophilus Finck, William James Henderson, James Huneker and Henry Edward Krehbiel. Other leading critics of this time included John Alexander Fuller Maitland, Samuel Langford and Ernest Newman in Britain, and Paul Bekker in Germany.

After World War II, leading critics included Eric Blom, Neville Cardus, Martin Cooper, Olin Downes, Harold C. Schonberg and Virgil Thomson. Influential music critics from the late 20th century include Martin Bernheimer, Robert Commanday, Richard Dyer, Michael Kennedy and Michael Steinberg. In the 21st century fewer newspapers have dedicated critics for classical music, but writers have still been active, such as Alex Ross at The New Yorker, Anthony Tommasini at The New York Times and both Tim Page and Anne Midgette at The Washington Post.

Zachary Woolfe of the New York Times was reassigned in July 2025, Michael Andor Brodeur's job at the Washington Post was eliminated in February 2026, and the 81 year-old Mark Swed retired in September 2026 from the Los Angeles Times. None of them has a successor. Swed was described by Norman Lebrecht as "America's Last Music Critic".

== List by publication ==
Aftonbladet (Sweden)

- Adolf Lindgren, 1874–1905.

The Atlas (UK)

- Edward Holmes, 1826–1838 (and later).

Berliner Tageblatt (Germany)

- Gustav Engel (contributor, 1861–1895)
- Heinrich Ehrlich (1878–1898)
- Max Marschalk (contributor, 1895–1934)
- Leopold Schmidt (1897–1927)
- Alfred Einstein (1927–1933)

Berliner Zeitung am Mittag (Germany)

- Adolf Weissmans, 1920s
- Hans Heinz Stuckenschmidt, 1929–1934

Birmingham Post (UK)

- Stephen Stratton, 1877–1906.
- Ernest Newman, 1906–1919.
- A J Sheldon (1874–1931), 1920–1931
- Eric Blom, 1931–1946.
- John F Waterhouse, 1946–1965
- Kenneth Dommett, 1965-1970s...?
- Christopher Morley, 1988-2024

Boston Daily Advertiser (USA)

- Louis C. Elson, music editor and critic (1888–1920)

Boston Evening Transcript (USA)

- Francis H. Jenks, music and dramatic editor (1881–1894)
- Henry Taylor Parker (1905–1934)
- Paul Secon (late 1930s?)
- Olin Downes (1939–1941)

The Boston Globe (USA)

- Michael Steinberg, 1964–1976.
- Richard Dyer, 1976–2006.
- Jeremy Eichler, 2006–2024.

The Boston Herald (USA)

- Philip Hale, 1903–1934.

Chicago Daily News (USA)

- Donal J Henahan (1957–67)
- Bernard Jacobson (1967–1973)

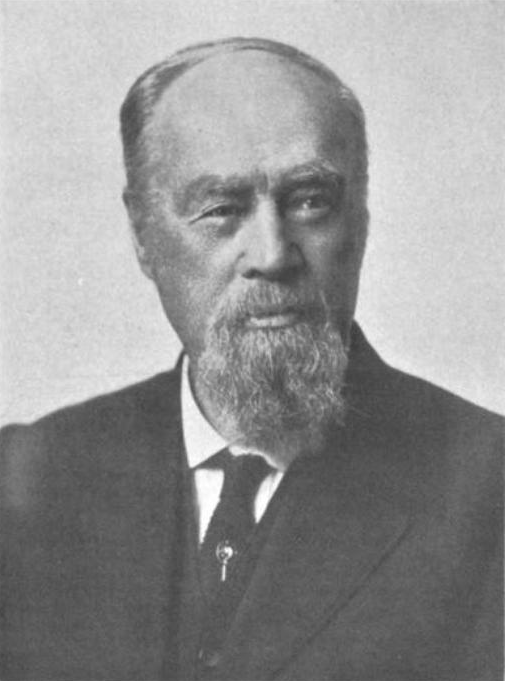
George Putnam Upton, critic of the Chicago Tribune

Chicago Tribune (USA)

- George Putnam Upton, 1861–1881.
- William Matthews (W. S. B. Matthews), 1878–1886.
- Frederick Grant Gleason, 1884–1889.
- Ruth Scott Miller (1895–1984), 1920–1921.
- Edward Moore (1877–1935), 1921–1935.
- Albert Goldberg (1898–1990), 1943–1947.
- John von Rhein, 1978–2018.

Le Correspondant (France)

- Camille Bellaigue (c1878–1885)

The Courier-Mail (Australia)

- Roger Covell (late 1940s–1950s)
- William Lovelock (1959–1981)

Daily Express (UK)

- Francis Toye, leader writer, then music critic, 1922–1925.
- Arthur Jacobs, 1947–1952.
- Noël Goodwin, chief music and dance critic, 1965–1978.

Daily Graphic (UK)

- R. A. Streatfeild, 1898–1902.

Daily Herald (UK)

- Rutland Boughton, from 1912.
- Spike Hughes, 1933–36.
- Stuart Fletcher, 1930s.
- Martin Cooper, 1946–50.

Daily Mail (UK)

- Richard Capell, 1911–1933.
- Edwin Evans, 1933–1945.
- Ralph Hill, assistant music critic from 1933, chief music critic, 1945–1948.
- Percy Cater, 1953–1960s.

Daily News (UK)

- George Hogarth, 1846–1866.
- Edward A Baughan, circa 1904–1910.
- Alfred Kalisch, 1912–1933?

Joseph Bennett in 1910

The Daily Telegraph (UK)

- Campbell Clarke, 1855?–1870.
- Joseph Bennett, 1870–1906.
- Robin Legge, 1906–1931. (pen name Musicus)
- Herbert Hughes, 1911–1932.
- Ferruccio Bonavia, 1920–1950.
- Richard Capell, 1933–1954.
- Martin Cooper, music critic from 1950, chief music critic, 1954–1976.
- Peter Stadlen, music critic from 1959, chief music critic, 1976–85.
- Colin Mason, music critic from 1964
- Anthony Payne, 1965–1987.
- Gerald Abraham, 1967–68 (filling in for both Stadlen and Cooper).
- Michael Kennedy, staff music critic from 1950, joint chief music critic, 1986–2005.
- Geoffrey Norris, music critic from 1983, chief music critic from 1995 to 2009.
- Ivan Hewett, music critic from 2002, chief music critic from 2009.

Evening News (UK)

- William McNaught, 1933–1939.
- Mosco Carner, concert music critic, 1957–1961.
- Leslie Ayre, music and opera (until 1971)

Evening Standard (known as The Standard, 1827–1904) (UK)

- Henry Frost, 1888–1901.
- Percy Scholes, 1913–1920.
- Herbert Antcliffe (music critic from 1915)
- Arthur Jacobs, 1956–1958.
- Rick Jones, 1992–2002.
- Barry Millington, 2002–2020s.

Financial Times (UK)

- Andrew Porter, 1953–1972.
- Ronald Crichton, 1972–1978.
- Max Loppert, 1980–94.
- Andrew Clark, from the late 1990s (now retired).

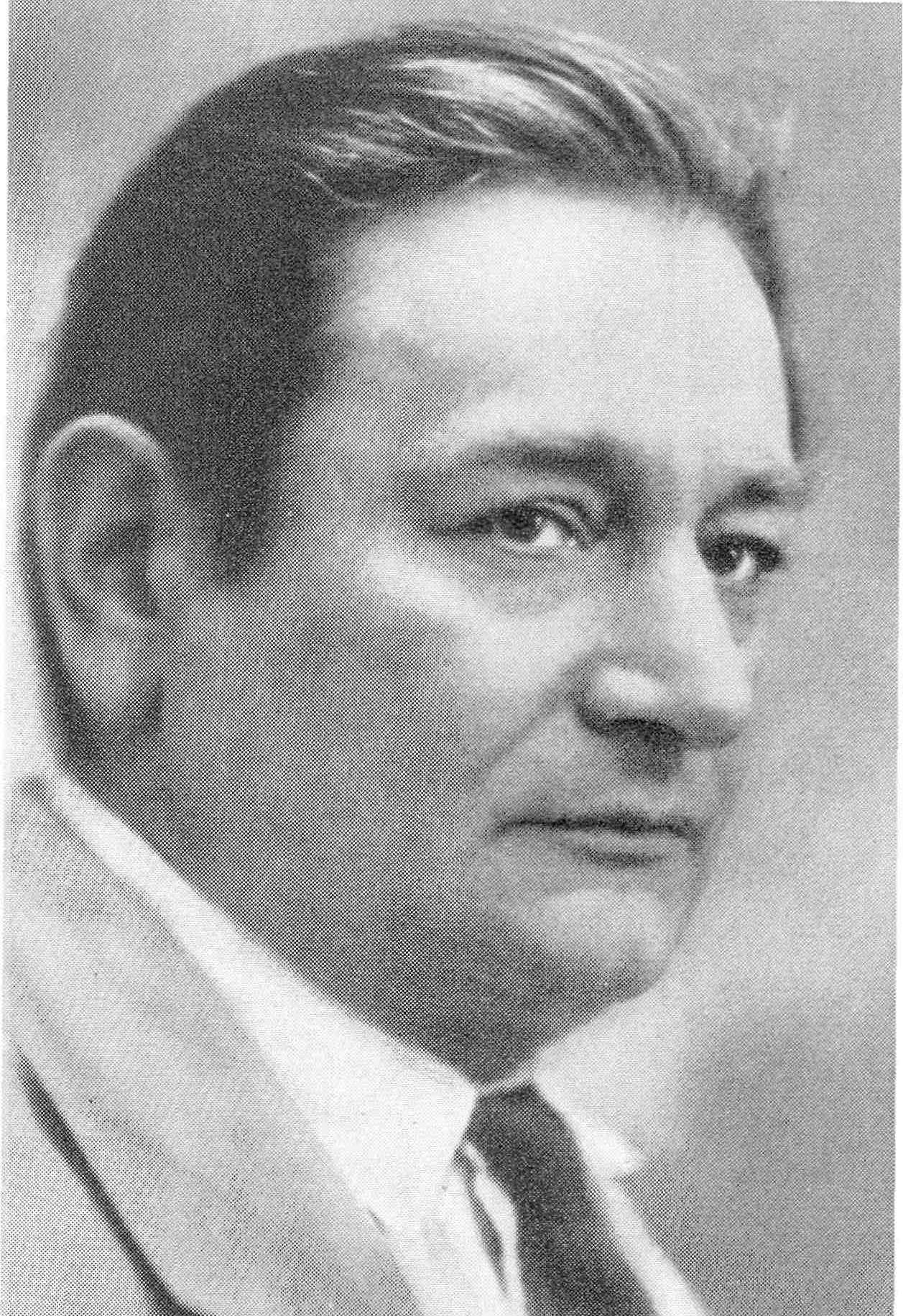
Paul Bekker in c. 1925–27

Frankfurter Zeitung (Germany)

- Engelbert Humperdick, 1890–1895
- Paul Bekker, 1911–1923.

Glasgow Herald (UK)

- Malcolm Rayment, until 1983.
- Michael Turnelty, 1983–2011.

The Guardian (until 1959 The Manchester Guardian) (UK)

- George Fremantle, 1867–1895.
- Arthur Johnstone, 1896–1904.
- Ferruccio Bonavia, 1902–1912
- Ernest Newman, 1905–1906.
- Samuel Langford, 1906–1927.
- Neville Cardus, 1927–1940.
- Philip Hope-Wallace, music and theatre critic, 1946–1979.
- Colin Mason, 1950–1964.
- Edward Greenfield, record critic from 1955, music critic from 1964, chief music critic, 1977–1993.
- Gerald Larner, assistant music critic, 1962–5, chief Northern music critic, 1965–1993.
- Hugo Cole, music critic 1965–1995
- Andrew Clements, chief music critic 1993–2025.
- Tom Service, from 1999 to 2003?

The Independent (UK)

- Bayan Northcott, 1986–2009.
- Anthony Payne, 1987–1997.
- Anna Pickard, 2000–2013 (Independent on Sunday).
- Edward Seckerson, chief classical music and opera critic, circa 2009–2012.

Los Angeles Daily News (USA)

- Richard Ginell, 1978–1990.

Los Angeles Times (USA)

- Albert Goldberg, 1947–1965.
- Martin Bernheimer, chief music and dance critic, 1965–1996.
- Mark Swed, 1996–2026.

The Morning Chronicle (UK)

- William Ayrton. Honorary musical and literary critic, 1816–26.
- George Hogarth, 1834–1844.
- Charles Lewis Gruneisen, circa 1845–1853.

The Morning Post (UK)

- John Ella, reviewer 1826–1842.
- Howard Glover, 1849–1865.
- Henry Sutherland Edwards, 1865–1869.
- William Alexander Barrett (1834–1891), 1869–1891.
- Arthur Hervey, 1892–1908.
- Francis Toye, 1925–1937.
- Scott Goddard, 1928.
- Robin Hull, assistant music critic, 1934–1937.

Münchner Neueste Nachrichten (Germany)

- Heinrich Porges, 1880–1900.
- Rudolf Louis, 1900–1914.

Neue Freie Presse (Austria)

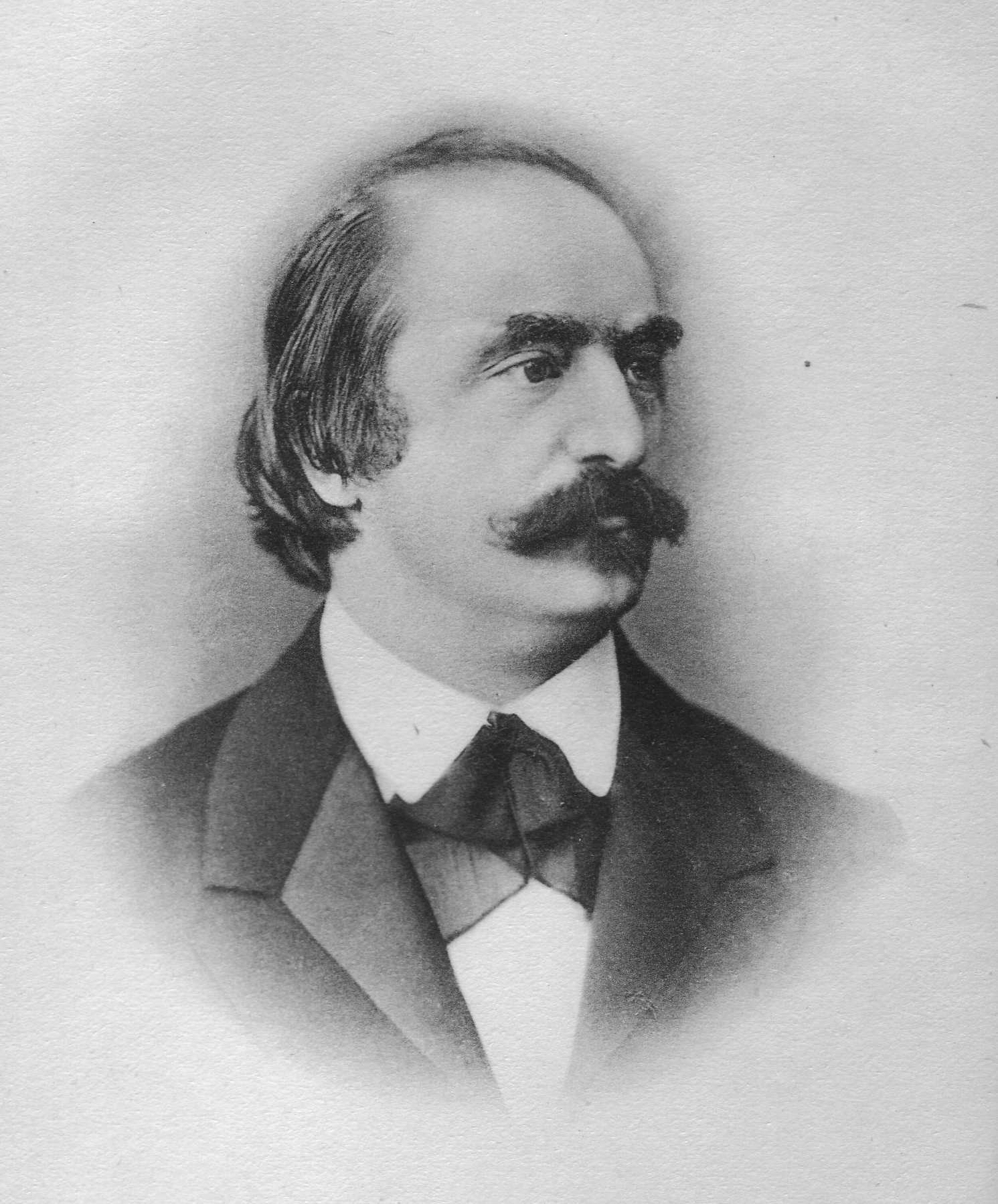
Portrait of Eduard Hanslick, 40 years old

- Eduard Hanslick, 1864–1904.
- Richard Heuberger, 1896–1901.
- Julius Korngold, 1904–1934.
- Joseph Reitler, 1906-1938
- Hermann Ullrich (1888–1982), music writer, 1926–1938.

Neues Wiener Tagblatt (Austria)

- Richard Heuberger, 1881–1889.
- Max Kalbeck, 1886–1921.
- Ernst Décsey, 1920–1938.
- Joseph Marx, 1931–1938.

News Chronicle (UK)

- Scott Goddard, 1938–1955.
- George Dannatt, 1944–1956.

New Statesman (UK)

- W. J. Turner, 1915–1940.
- Desmond Shawe-Taylor, 1945–1958.
- David Drew, 1959–1967.

The New Yorker (USA)

- Robert A. Simon, 1925–1948.
- Winthrop Sargeant, 1949–1972.
- Andrew Porter, 1972–1992.
- Paul Griffiths, 1992–1996.
- Alex Ross, 1996–2026.

New York Daily News (USA)

- William Zakariasen, 1976–1993.

New York Globe (after 1923 The New York Sun) (USA)

- Henry Taylor Parker (c.1900-1905)
- Pitts Sanborn (1905–1923)

New York Herald Tribune (USA)

- Richard Storrs Willis, circa 1840s–1850s (New York Tribune).
- Henry C Watson, 1863–1867? (New York Tribune).
- Gustav Kobbé, circa 1860s–1880s (New York Herald).
- Myron Cooney, 1865–1884 (New York Herald).
- John Rose Green Hassard, 1866–1883 (New York Tribune).
- Henry E Krehbiel, circa 1880–1923 (New York Tribune).
- Lawrence Gilman, 1896–1898 (New York Herald), 1923–1939 (Herald Tribune).
- Virgil Thomson, 1940–1954.
- Herbert Kupferberg, music staff writer, 1942–1966.
- Paul Lang, 1954–1963.
- Alan Rich, 1963–68.

New York Post (USA)

- Henry T Finck, 1881–1924.
- Olga Samaroff, 1926–1928.
- Oscar Thompson, 1928–1934.
- Harriett Johnson, 1943–1971.
- Speight Jenkins, 1973–1981.

The New York Sun (USA)

- James Huneker, 1890s–1902.
- William James Henderson, 1902–1920s.
- Oscar Thompson, 1937–1945.

The New York Times (USA)

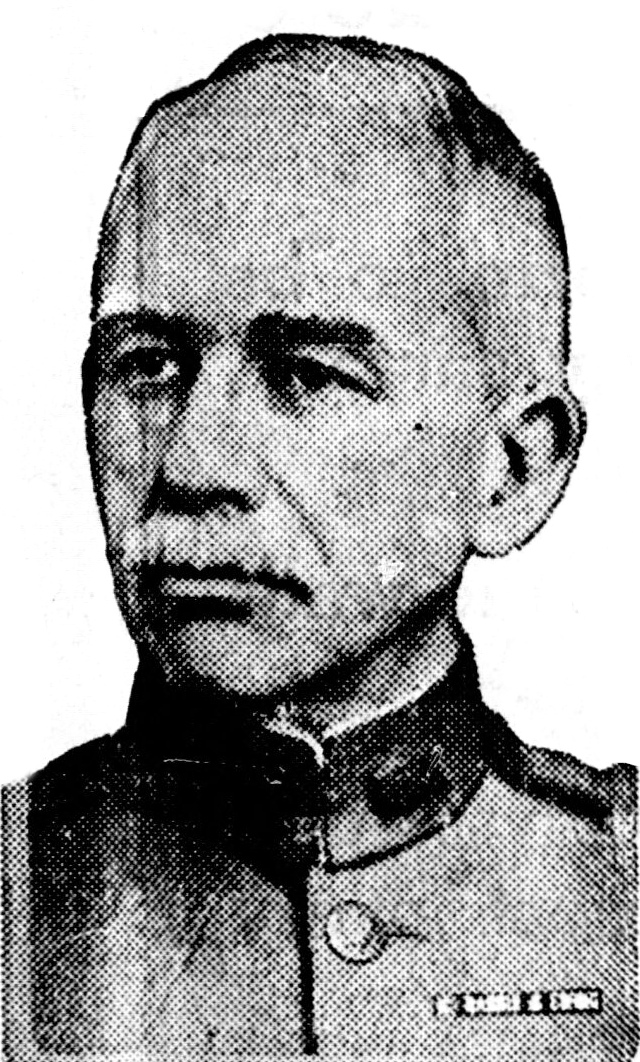
Richard Aldrich, c. 1918

- Charles Bailey Seymour, 1849–1865.
- Frederick A. Schwab, 1875–1887.
- William James Henderson, 1887–1902.
- Richard Aldrich, 1902–1923.
- Olin Downes, 1924–1955.
- Howard Taubman, staff writer from 1930, music editor from 1935, chief music critic 1955–1960.
- Harold C. Schonberg, staff writer from 1950, chief music critic, 1960–1980.
- Donal Henahan, staff writer from 1967, then chief music critic 1980–1991.
- Edward Rothstein, 1991–1995, then critic at large until 2014.
- Bernard Holland, staff writer from 1980, chief music critic from 1995 to 2000, then national music critic until 2008.
- Anthony Tommasini, staff writer from 1996, chief music critic from 2000 to December 2021.
- Zachary Woolfe, April 2022 to July 2025.

The New York World (USA)

- James Huneker (1919–21).
- Deems Taylor (1921–27).

The Observer (UK)

- Edgar Frederick Jacques, from 1894.
- Ernest Newman, 1919.
- Percy Scholes, 1920–1925.
- A. H. Fox Strangways, 1925–1939.
- William Glock, music critic from 1934, chief music critic, 1939–45 (but also served in the Royal Air Force).
- Eric Blom, 1949–1953.
- Peter Heyworth, 1955–1987.
- Nicholas Kenyon, 1986–1992.
- Andrew Porter, 1992–1996.
- Fiona Maddocks. 1997–2002.
- Anthony Holden, 2002–2008.
- Fiona Maddocks, 2010–present.

Philadelphia Inquirer (USA)

- Daniel Webster, 1963–1999.
- David Patrick Stearns, from 2000.

The Plain Dealer (USA)

- James Hotchkiss Rogers, 1915–1932.
- Herbert Elwell, 1932–1964.
- Robert Finn, 1964–1992.
- Donald Resenberg, 1992–2008.
- Zachary Lewis, 2008–2020.

San Francisco Chronicle (USA)

- Alfred Frankenstein, 1934–1964.
- Robert Commanday, 1964–1993.
- Joshua Kosman, music critic from 1988, chief music critic from 1993, retired April 2024.

San Francisco Examiner (USA)

- Michael Walsh, 1977–1981.

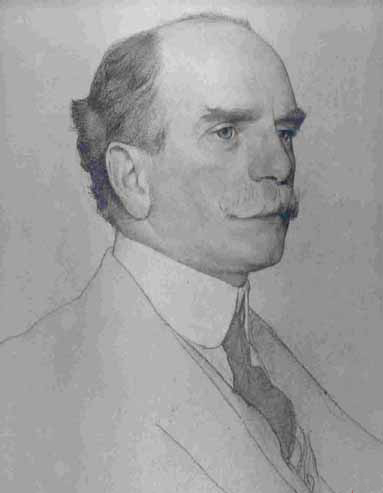
William Barclay Squire in 1904

Saturday Review (UK)

- William Barclay Squire, 1888–1894.
- John F Runciman, 1894–1916.

The Scotsman (UK)

- Conrad Wilson, 1963–1991.
- Mary Miller, 1992–1998.
- Stephen Johnson, 1998–1999.

Sheffield Telegraph (UK)

- Herbert Antcliffe (1895–1915)
- George MacCaffrey (1916–1939)
- George Linstead (appointed 1940)
- Bernard Lee (from the 1980s, four decades)

La Stampa (Italy)

- Andrea Della Corte, 1919–1967.

The Star (UK)

- Ernest Bax, 1888 (as 'Musigena')
- George Bernard Shaw, 1888–1890 (as 'Corno di Bassetto').
- A W Symons, 1892-????

Sunday Express (UK)

- Ralph Hill, 1940s.

Sunday Referee (UK)

- Christopher Stone, record columist, 1930s
- Constant Lambert (1931-1938)

The Sunday Telegraph (UK)

- John Warrack, 1961–1972.
- Malcolm Hayes, 1986–1989.
- Michael Kennedy, 1989–2005.

The Sunday Times (UK)

- Joseph Bennett, 1865–1870.
- Hermann Klein, music (particularly opera) critic, 1881–1901.
- Ernest Newman, 1920–1959.
- Felix Aprahamian, deputy music critic (1948–1989)
- Desmond Shawe-Taylor, 1958–1983.
- David Cairns, 1983–1992.

The Sydney Morning Herald (Australia)

- Roger Covell, 1960 – late 1990s.

Der Tagesspiegel (Germany)

- Hans Heinz Stuckenschmidt, 1947–?.
- Albrecht Dümling, 1978–1998.

Le Temps (France)

- Johannès Weber (1818–1902), 1861–1895.
- Pierre Lalo, 1898–1914.
- Florent Schmitt, 1929–1939.

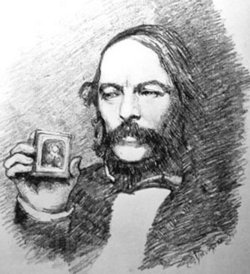
James William Davison – Pencil sketch of a daguerreotype, c. 1857

The Times (UK)

- Thomas Alsager, 1817–1845.
- James William Davison, 1846–1879.
- Francis Hueffer, 1879–1889.
- J A Fuller Maitland, 1889–1911.
- H. C. Colles, assistant music critic, then chief music critic, 1911–1943.
- A. H. Fox Strangways, deputised for Colles (who was on active service) during WW1.
- Frank Howes, staff writer from 1925, chief music critic, 1943–1960.
- William Mann, assistant music critic from 1948, chief music critic, 1960–1982.
- Stanley Sadie, music critic, 1964–1981.
- Paul Griffiths, 1982–1992.
- Richard Morrison, music critic from 1984, chief music critic from 1992.

Toronto Star (Canada)

- John Terauds, 2005–2012.
- William Littler (current).

Vossische Zeitung (Germany)

- Johann Carl Friedrich Rellstab, music critic, c 1800–1813
- Ludwig Rellstab, music critic, from 1826
- Max Marschalk, music critic, 1894-1933

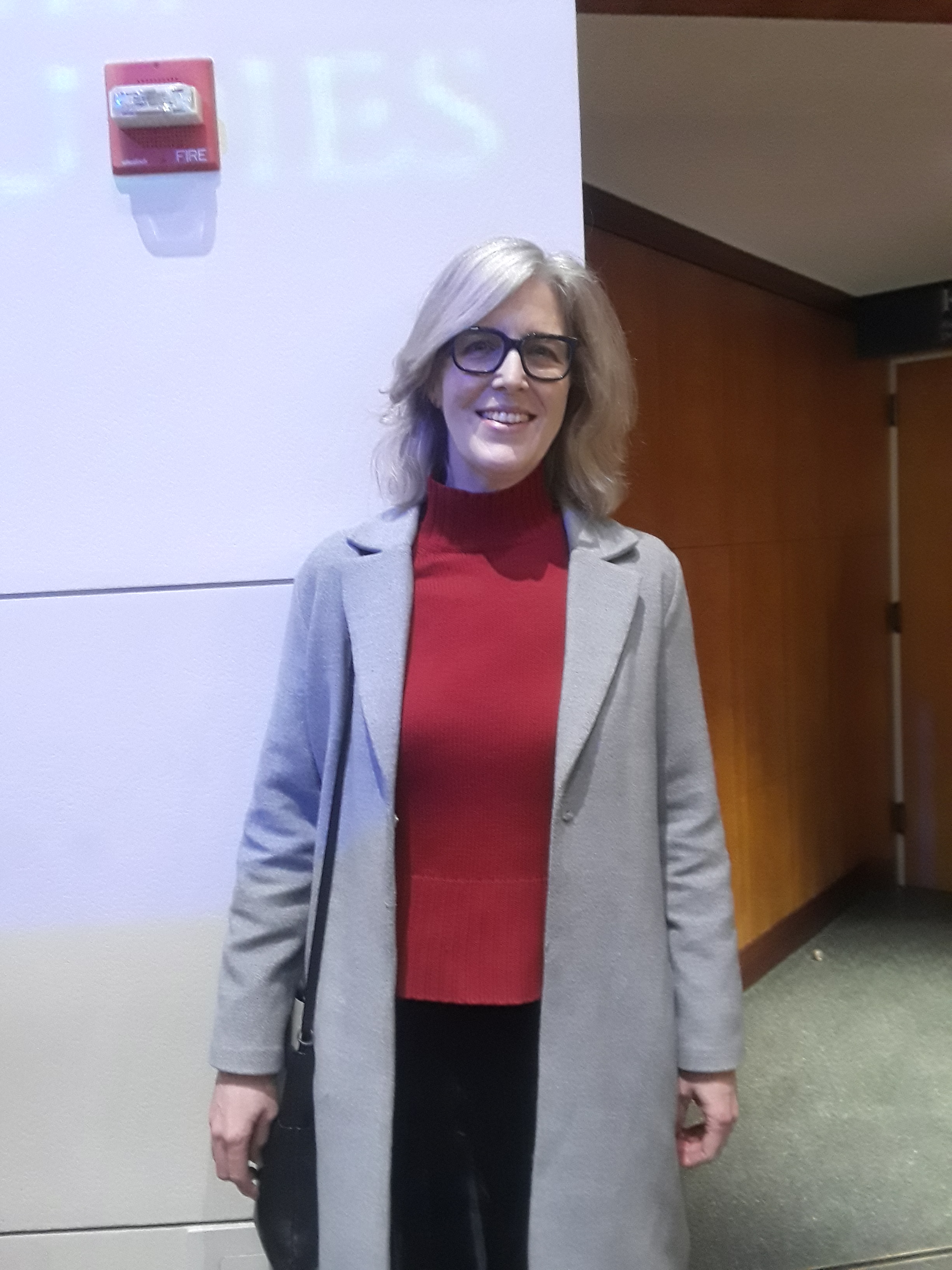
Anne Midgette in 2020

The Washington Post (USA)

- Paul Hume, music editor, 1946–1982.
- Joseph McLellan, mid-1970s–1995.
- Tim Page, 1995–1999, 2001–2008.
- Philip Kennicott, 1999–2001.
- Anne Midgette, 2008–2019.
- Michael Andor Brodeur 2020–2026.

Wiener Zeitung (Austria)

- Eduard Hanslick (1848–50)
- Ludwig Speidel (1858–9)
- Joseph Marx (from 1946).

The Yorkshire Post (UK)

- Cyril Dunn (until 1947)
- Ernest Bradbury, 1947–1984.
- David Denton, 2000s–2020s.

== See also ==
- Music criticism
- Music journalism
- The Musical Times

== Sources ==
- Davidsson, Åke [in Swedish]; Heintz, Veslemöy (1986). "Swedish Music Periodicals of the 19th Century". Fontes Artis Musicae. 33 (2): 194–210. JSTOR 23507205.
- Dibble, Jeremy and Horton, Julian (ed.). British Musical Criticism and Intellectual Thought, 1850–1950 (2018)
- Dingle, Christopher (ed.). The Cambridge History of Music Criticism (2019)
- Graf, Max. Composer and critic: Two hundred years of musical criticism (1948)
- Grant, Mark and Friedheim, Eric. A History of Classical Music Criticism in America (1998)
- Horowtiz, Joseph (2012). Moral Fire: Musical Portraits from America's Fin de Siècle. Berkeley: University of California Press. ISBN 978-0-520-26744-2.
- Howes, Frank; Cooper, Martin; Carner, Mosco; Cater, Percy; Chissell, Joan; Goodwin, Noël; Mann, William; Warrack, John; Mitchell, Donald; Porter, Andrew; Reid, Charles (April 1960). "Music Critics and Criticism Today". The Musical Times. 101 (1406): 220–225. doi:10.2307/949580. JSTOR 949580.
- Howes, Frank (1966). The English Musical Renaissance. London: Secker & Warburg.
- Hughes, Meirion (2002). The English Musical Renaissance and the Press 1850-1914: Watchmen of Music. London: Ashgate Publishing. ISBN 978-0-7546-0588-1.
- Josephson, Nors S. (1972–1973). "François-Joseph Fétis and Richard Wagner". Revue belge de Musicologie / Belgisch Tijdschrift voor Muziekwetenschap. 26/27: 84–89. doi:10.2307/3686542. JSTOR 3686542.
- Langley. L. 'The Musical Press in Nineteenth Century England', in Notes, March 1990, pp. 583–592
- Maine, Basil. Behold these Daniels: being Studies of Contemporary Music Critics (1928)
- Mueser, Barbara (1975). The Criticism of New Music in New York: 1919–1929 (Ph.D.). New York: University of New York. OCLC 19804587.
- Scholes, Percy. The Mirror of Music 1844-1944; A Century of Musical Life in Britain as reflected in the pages of the Musical Times, Novello/Oxford University Press (1947)
