= A. H. Fox Strangways =

British musicologist (1859–1948)

Arthur Henry Fox Strangways (14 September 1859 – 2 May 1948) was an English musicologist, translator, editor and music critic.

After a career as a schoolmaster, Fox Strangways developed an interest in Indian music, and in the years before the First World War he did much to bring Rabindranath Tagore to wider attention. Fox Strangways wrote music criticism for The Times, was chief music critic of The Observer, and founded the quarterly magazine Music and Letters.

Together with the tenor Steuart Wilson, Fox Strangways made English translations of the lieder of Franz Schubert and Robert Schumann.

== Life and career ==
Fox Strangways was born in Norwich, the first son of Walter Aston Fox Strangways, an army officer, and his wife, Harriet Elizabeth née Buller. He was educated at Wellington College and Balliol College, Oxford, where he took a third-class degree in Classics in 1882. For the following two years he was a student at the Berlin Hochschule für Musik.

For the next twenty-six years, Fox Strangways was a schoolmaster, first at Dulwich College (1884–86) and then at his old school, Wellington (1887–1910), where he was the music master from 1893 to 1901, and a housemaster from 1901 to 1910. During his time at Wellington he visited India, and became interested in Indian music. After he left Wellington he returned to India for eight months in 1911, collecting material for a book, The Music of Hindostan (India Society, 1914), which Grove's Dictionary of Music and Musicians described in 2013 as "still a classic on its subject". He befriended the poet and musician Rabindranath Tagore, and acted, without payment, as his literary agent in the years before the First World War. He secured valuable contracts for Tagore and made possible his international career.

Returning to England, Fox Strangways settled in London, where he lived in rooms at King's Bench Walk before moving to 38 Lansdowne Crescent, Notting Hill. He became Honorary Secretary of the India Society. He contributed concert reviews to The Times and later joined the staff of the paper. During the First World War he deputised for the chief music critic, H C Colles, who was away on active service. In 1925, at the age of sixty six, he moved to The Observer as chief music critic, where he remained until 1939, when he retired aged eighty and was succeeded by William Glock. When Colles edited the third edition of Grove's Dictionary (1927), Fox Strangways was a major contributor.

In 1920 Fox Strangways realised an ambition to found a periodical "which should deal fully and authoritatively with musical matters of abiding interest". He financed and edited Music and Letters, a quarterly publication. The first edition contained a controversial article about Elgar by Bernard Shaw praising him at the expense of Hubert Parry, to which Elgar responded in the next issue strongly defending Parry. Fox Strangways recruited what The Times described as "a brilliant group of contributors [who] packed its pages with good writing and good sense". He retired as editor in 1936; the magazine continued under a series of editors including Eric Blom, Richard Capell, J.A. Westrup, Denis Arnold, Nigel Fortune, John Whenham and Tim Carter, and continues (at 2013) to be published, latterly by the Oxford University Press.

He retired to Dinton, Wiltshire, where he died at the age of 88. He was unmarried.

== Books ==
- Advanced Passages for German Unseen Translation (1899)
- The Music of Hindostan (1914)
- with Steuart Wilson: Schubert's Songs Translated (1924)
- with Steuart Wilson: Schumann's Songs Translated (1929)
- with Maud Karpeles: Cecil Sharp – His Life and Work (1933)
- ed. Steuart Wilson: Music Observed (1936) – collected articles from The Observer
