= Elizabeth Forbes (musicologist) =

English writer (1924–2014)

Elizabeth Forbes (3 August 1924 – 22 October 2014) was an English author, journalist, music critic, and musicologist who specialised in writing about opera. Actively working as a professional writer and journalist from the early 1970s through 2013, her main areas of interest were 19th and 20th-century opera (French and Scandinavian in particular) and singers, both historical and present-day. She published multiple books related to opera and contributed many reviews and articles to several notable periodicals and newspapers internationally, including the Financial Times, The Independent, The Musical Times, Opera, Opera Canada and Opera News among several others.

== Life and career ==
Born in Camberley, Elizabeth Forbes was the daughter of Admiral Sir Charles Forbes; who was Commander-in-Chief of the Home Fleet during World War II. Her mother, Marie Louise Berndtson, was Admiral Forbes's second wife and was originally from Sweden. Elizabeth served in the Women's Royal Navy Service during World War II from 1941 through 1946. After the war, she spent two years living in Stockholm where she learned to speak Swedish fluently and worked in a book shop. Upon returning to England in 1949, she joined the staff at the well known Curzon Street bookshop, Heywood Hill where she worked for many years.

Forbes began her career as a journalist in the early 1970s working as an opera critic for the Financial Times; working with Andrew Porter and later Ronald Crichton. She quickly reoriented her career towards working full time as a critic and writer on opera for several periodicals in addition to her regular work for the Financial Times. These included working as a foreign correspondent for the magazines Opera Canada, Opera News and Opera International; and writing for the UK based magazine Opera on whose governing board she was a member. She also penned more than 100 obituaries for The Independent on people connected to opera. She remained active as a writer until 2013 when a series of strokes impacted her ability to continue.

Forbes was the author of numerous books on various subjects related to opera, including her 1985 work, Mario and Grisi, which details the lives of opera singers Giulia Grisi and Giovanni Matteo Mario. She wrote a significant number of singing translations of the libretti of many operas, from French, German and Swedish, including works by Gaspare Spontini, Giacomo Meyerbeer and Franz Berwald, and also extensively contributed to reference works on singers and other operatic topics, including several hundred articles in the Grove Dictionary of Music and Musicians and the related The Grove Book of Opera Singers.

She died on 22 October 2014. She never married and never had children, but lived with her partner, Harry Lyons.

== Partial list of works ==
=== Books ===
- Elizabeth Forbes (1977). Opera from A to Z. Kaye & Ward. ISBN 9780498020469.
- Elizabeth Forbes (1982). The Observer's Book of Opera. Warne. ISBN 9780723216384.
- Elizabeth Forbes (1985). Mario and Grisi: A Biography. V. Gollancz. ISBN 9780575036062.
