= Anthony Tommasini =

American music critic and author (born 1948)

- Born: Anthony Carl Tommasini; April 14, 1948 (age 78); Brooklyn, New York, U.S.
- Education: Yale University; Boston University
- Occupations: Music critic; author; pianist; teacher
- Notable credits: The New York Times; The Boston Globe

Anthony Carl Tommasini (born April 14, 1948) is an American music critic and author who specializes in classical music. Described as "a discerning critic, whose taste, knowledge and judgment have made him a must-read", Tommasini was the chief classical music critic for The New York Times from 2000 to 2021. Also a pianist, he has released two CDs and two books on the music of his colleague and mentor, the composer and critic Virgil Thomson.

A classical music enthusiast since his youth, Tommasini attended both Yale University and Boston University to study piano and then taught music at Emerson College. In 1986 he left academia to write music criticism for The Boston Globe. Tommasini joined the Times in 1996 and became its chief classical music critic in 2000 for over two decades. He traveled to cover important premieres of contemporary classical music, encouraged diversity in both classical repertoire and ensembles, and wrote books, notably The Indispensable Composers: A Personal Guide.

== Early life and education ==
Anthony Carl Tommasini was born in Brooklyn, New York, on April 14, 1948. (Note: See Tommasini's full name, Anthony Carl Tommasini, in Tommasini (1984, p. 234)) He grew up in a family of five in Malverne on Long Island, New York. Though his parents were not musically inclined, Tommasini was interested in classical music from a young age. Beginning piano lessons in his youth, at 16 he won a piano competition at The Town Hall in Manhattan, performing a Mozart concerto. His piano teacher encouraged him to seek out Bach's Mass in B Minor. It proved formative: "I was emotionally overcome. And yes, I sensed immediately that Mrs. Gehrig was right about this mastepiece." From age 15 on, he regularly attended the Metropolitan Opera, with operas by Puccini being his favorites. Other formative performances included Joan Sutherland as Lucia in Donizetti's Lucia di Lammermoor; Birgit Nilsson as the title role of Puccini's Turandot; Renata Tebaldi as Mimì in Puccini's La bohème; and Leontyne Price as the title role of Verdi's Aida. Tommasini also cites a performance of Leonard Bernstein conducting the New York Philharmonic in Beethoven's Symphony No. 3 and Stravinsky's The Rite of Spring as having been particularly inspirational when he was in his teens. He was a fan of the pianist Rudolf Serkin, whose recitals he frequently attended, and was overwhelmed by Stravinsky conducting his Symphony of Psalms at the Lincoln Center. A graduate of Saint Paul's School in Garden City, New York, Tommasini studied piano with Donald Currier at Yale University, receiving a Bachelor of Arts (1970) and a Master of Music (1972). He subsequently earned a Doctor of Musical Arts (1982) from Boston University, during which he studied with the pianist Leonard Shure. A decade later, he won the 1998 Boston University School of Music Distinguished Alumni Award.

== Career ==
Based in Boston, Tommasini taught music at Emerson College from 1978 to 1986, and also led non-fiction writing workshops at Wesleyan University and Brandeis University. In 1985 at Emerson, he met the composer Virgil Thomson, who became both a friend and mentor. Tommasini published a survey of Thomson's piano music, Virgil Thomson's Musical Portraits (1986), which was a revision and expansion of his 1982 DMA dissertation. Thomson wrote a portrait of Tommasini, "Tony Tommasini: A Study in Chords". He was denied tenure at Emerson College, as the college eliminated his position; Tommasini later noted that although disappointing, "the best thing that ever happened to me was not getting tenure at Emerson, or I might still be there, and none of [my future career] would've happened". In response, Tommasini turned to music criticism. He was a freelancer, and wrote for The Boston Globe for a decade, beginning in 1986.

Tommasini became a staff writer for The New York Times in 1996, and was promoted to chief classical music critic in 2000. In addition to Thomson, his mentors include Richard Dyer, who was chief classical music critic of The Boston Globe for 33 years. At the Times, Tommasini traveled for important premieres of contemporary classical music, including Saariaho's L'Amour de loin (2000), Adès's The Tempest (2004) and Turnage's Anna Nicole (2011). He covered certain musicians particularly often, such as Peter Serkin, Leif Ove Andsnes, Michael Tilson Thomas and Esa-Pekka Salonen. Tommasini often advocated for increased diversity in the classical music world; his comment that "American orchestras should think a little less about how they play and a little more about what they play and why they play it" is often quoted. In this regard, his colleagues at the Times described him as "something of a provocateur: challenging the field to take more risks, embrace new music and rethink old, hidebound habits". Tommasini's 2020 article which suggested blind auditions be abandoned so race can be considered to assist in diversifying ensembles was met with "intense debate"; In New Music USA, Maia Jasper White noted that the idea received "heavy backlash". Tommasini stepped down from his post in 2021; with a 21 year tenure he has been chief classical music critic of The New York Times for the longest period since Olin Downes. (Note: Olin Downes was chief classical music critic for 31 years, from 1924 to 1955.) In April 2022, Zachary Woolfe was named Tommasini's successor as chief classical music critic for the Times.

Tommasini is the author of Virgil Thomson: Composer on the Aisle, which received the 1998 ASCAP-Deems Taylor Award, and Opera: A Critic's Guide to the 100 Most Important Works and the Best Recordings. Also a pianist, Tommasini made two recordings of music by Virgil Thomson for Northeastern Records, Portraits and Self-Portraits and Mostly About Love: Songs and Vocal Works. Both were funded through grants from the National Endowment for the Arts.

In 2011, after soliciting comments from readers, Tommasini published a list of the ten greatest classical composers. They were, in order: 1. Johann Sebastian Bach 2. Ludwig van Beethoven 3. Wolfgang Amadeus Mozart 4. Franz Schubert 5. Claude Debussy 6. Igor Stravinsky 7. Johannes Brahms 8. Giuseppe Verdi 9. Richard Wagner 10. Béla Bartók. The project was not without controversy. He added: "Would that I could include my beloved Puccini" and that "in an act of contrition, I am beginning a personal project to listen nonstop to recordings of Britten, Haydn, Chopin, Monteverdi, Ligeti and those composers whom I could not squeeze in but whose music carries me through my days. He discussed these composers, and others, in his book The Indispensable Composers (2018).

Tommasini lives on Central Park West in Manhattan, New York City with his husband Ben McCommon, who is a psychiatrist. After his departure from the Times at the end of 2021, Tommasini said he might return to teaching, and that he had two further book ideas. In 2022 he took up a teaching position at the Juilliard School's Extension Division, launching a new course, "Critical Listening with Anthony Tommasini". His book Voice of a Century: The Life and Artistry of Marian Anderson, described in a review in The American Scholar as a "thoughtful and eminently readable new biography of Anderson," was published in September 2026.

== Selected writings ==
=== Books ===
- Tommasini, Anthony (1986). Virgil Thomson's Musical Portraits. New York: Pendragon Press.
- —— (1997). Virgil Thomson: Composer on the Aisle. New York: W. W. Norton & Company.
- —— (2004). The New York Times Essential Library: Opera: A Critic's Guide to the 100 Most Important Works and the Best Recordings. New York: Times Books.
- —— (2018). The Indispensable Composers: A Personal Guide. New York: Penguin Press.
- (2026) Voice of a Century: The Life and Artistry of Marian Anderson

=== Articles ===
- Tommasini, Anthony (Spring 1984). "The Musical Portraits by Virgil Thomson". The Musical Quarterly. 70 (2): 234–247. doi:10.1093/mq/LXX.2.234. JSTOR 742212.
- —— (February 8, 1988). "Who'll Take Him To 'the Other Side'?". The New York Times.
- —— (February 11, 1996). "Theater; A Composer's Death Echoes in His Musical". The New York Times.
- —— (March 17, 1996). "Theather [sic]; The Seven-Year Odyssey That Led to 'Rent'". The New York Times.
- —— (February 23, 2004). "Royal Opera Review; Noises, Sounds, Sweet Airs From Young British Hope". The New York Times.
- —— (October 22, 2006). "A Lamentation on the Dearth of Divas". The New York Times.
- —— (September 6, 2007). "Italian operatic artistry at its finest". The New York Times.
- —— (September 9, 2007). "Next-Gen Conductors Ready for New York". The New York Times.
- —— (October 11, 2010). "Joan Sutherland, Flawless Soprano, Is Dead at 83". The New York Times.
- —— (January 21, 2011). "The Greatest". The New York Times. p. AR-1.
- —— (July 20, 2011). "Music of the Spheres". The New York Times.
- —— (September 24, 2017). "Conveying Sounds Through Words: The Classical Music Critic's Challenge". The New York Times.
- —— (July 16, 2020). "To Make Orchestras More Diverse, End Blind Auditions". The New York Times.
- —— (August 15, 2021). "Glimmerglass Creates Magic in Its Own Backyard". The New York Times.
- —— (September 19, 2021). "The New York Philharmonic Returns, in the Midst of Transitions". The New York Times.
- —— (December 17, 2021). "What Shouldn't Change About Classical Music". The New York Times.
- —— (January 4, 2022). "My First Times Byline: Anthony Tommasini". The New York Times.

== Discography ==
Recordings by Anthony Tommasini
| Year | Album | Performers | Label |
|---|---|---|---|
| 1990 | Portraits and Self Portraits; Works by Virgil Thomson | Anthony Tommasini, piano; and Sharan Leventhal violin | Northeastern Records |
| 1994 | Mostly about Love: Songs and Vocal Works; Works by Virgil Thomson | Anthony Tommasini, piano; various others (Note: Nancy Armstrong, soprano; D'Anna Fortunato, mezzo-soprano; Frank Kelley and Paul Kirby tenor; Sanford Sylvan, baritone; David Ripley, bass; James Russell Smith, percussion.) | Northeastern Records |
