= Ferruccio Bonavia =

English baritone (1894–1953)

Ferruccio Zernitz Bonavia (20 February 1877 – 5 February 1950) was an Italian born violinist, composer and critic who spent his working life in England.

Born in Trieste (then part of Austria-Hungary), Bonavia was the son of a musician, Eduardo Zernitz. He studied music in his home town and later in Milan. He moved to England at the age of 20 and was naturalised two years later. As a practicing musician he played violin in the Halle Orchestra under Hans Richter from 1902 until 1912. Willy Hess, the orchestra's leader, was also his teacher. He married Hilda Anne Tucker in July 1907. During the 1914-18 war he served as a private soldier and worked at the Foreign Office, furthering Anglo-Italian relations.

Bonavia is best remembered as a music critic and author. Before the war he worked for the Manchester Guardian under C P Scott and (from 1920 until his death) for the Daily Telegraph in London, where he worked for the first ten years under chief music critic Robin Legge. He also wrote for The New York Times, The Musical Times, Music and Letters and contributed to reference books including Grove's Dictionary of Music and Kobbe's Complete Opera Book. His book Musicians in Elysium contains imaginary conversations with composers of the past.

His compositions included a Violin Concerto (1911, premiered in Blackpool with the composer as soloist), chamber music (including a string octet and two string quartets, the first composed in 1909, the second completed in 1950 only a month before his death), and some songs, including a choral setting of Shelley's Autumn (1935).

Bonavia lived at various locations in London, including 352 Kew Road, Kew from 1914 to 1919, and 41 Royal Crescent, Holland Park, from 1919 to 1928. At the end of his life Bonavia's address was 39 Belsize Park Gardens, London NW3. He died in London, survived by his wife and their two sons.

His son, Dr Michael Robert Bonavia (1909–1999) had a long career in the transport industry and wrote over 20 books, including Economics of Transport (1936) and The Four Great Railways (1980).

== Books ==
- Verdi (1930, rev. 1947)
- Mozart (1938, Novello Short Biography)
- Rossini (1941, Novello Short Biography)
- 'The Solo Instrument', in A.L. Bacharach (ed.) The Musical Companion (1941)
- Musicians in Elysium (1949), With illustrations by Beatrice MacDermott.
- Musicians on Music (1956), anthology prepared for the press by Frank Howes.
