= Henry Theophilus Finck =

American music critic and author (1954–1926)

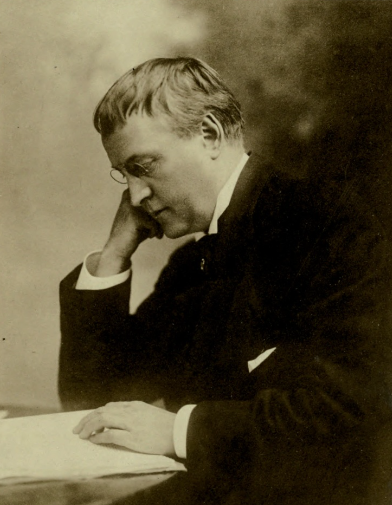
- Finck in 1913
- Born: Henry Gottlob Finck; 22 September 1854; Bethel, Missouri
- Died: 1 October 1926 (aged 72); Rumford, Maine
- Education: Harvard University
- Occupations: Music critic; author
- Notable credits: New York Evening Post; The Nation

Henry Theophilus Finck (22 September 1854 – 1 October 1926) was an American music critic and author. Among "the most prolific and influential critics of his day", he was chief classical music critic of both the New York Evening Post and The Nation from 1881 to 1924. He championed Romantic music, promoting composers such as Liszt, Wagner, Grieg and MacDowell. Along with his contemporaries Richard Aldrich, W.J. Henderson, James Huneker and Henry Edward Krehbiel, Finck is considered part of the 'Old Guard', a group of leading New York–based music critics who first established a uniquely American school of criticism.

== Biography ==
Finck was born at Bethel, Missouri, and raised in Portland, Oregon, where he was taught piano and violoncello. He taught himself Latin and Greek so thoroughly that he was able to enter Harvard as a sophomore in 1872. At Harvard, he studied philosophy, the classics, and music. He graduated in 1876.

He attended the Bayreuth Festival in 1876, of which he wrote accounts for newspapers and magazines. The Harris fellowship from Harvard being awarded to him, he spent three years (1878–1881) in the study of physiological psychology in Berlin, Heidelberg, and Vienna.

He became musical editor of the New York Evening Post in 1881 and was on the editorial staff of the associated journal, The Nation. He was connected with them for forty years. While at the Post, he also served as the epicurean editor and reviewed all the new garden books. He taught music history at the National Conservatory of Music of America for 30 years.

== Publications ==
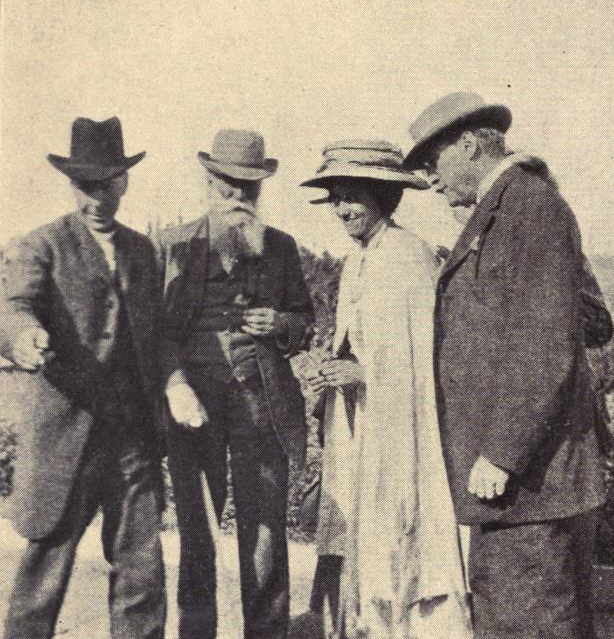
From left to right, Luther Burbank, John Burroughs, Edith Simonds and Finck

- The Gastronomic Value of Odours (1886)
- Romantic Love and Personal Beauty (New York, 1887)
- Chopin and Other Musical Essays (1889)
- Pacific Coast Scenic Tour (1890)
- Spain and Morocco (1891)
- Wagner and his Works (1893)
- Paderewski and his Art (1895)
- Lotus Time in Japan (1895)
- Primitive Love and Love Stories (1899)
- Pictorial Wagner (1899)
- Anton Seidl (1899)
- Songs and Song Writers (1900, 1921)
- Edvard Grieg (1905)
- Grieg and his Music (1909)
- Success in Music and How it is Won (1909)
- Massenet and his Opera (1910)
- Food and Flavor: A Gastronomic Guide to Health and Good Living (1913)
- Thirty Years of the National Conservatory of Music of America (1916)
- Richard Strauss: the Man and his Works (1917)
- Gardening With Brains: Fifty Years' Experience of a Horticultural Epicure (1922)
- Musical Laughs: Jokes, Tittle-tattle and Anecdotes Mostly Humorous About Musical Celebrities Gathered during his Forty-Three Years as Critic of the New York Evening Post (1924)
- My Adventures in the Golden Age of Music (1926)

== Sources ==
- Engeman, Richard (2020). "Henry Theophilus Finck". The Oregon Encyclopedia. Portland: Oregon Historical Society. (subscription required)
- Horowtiz, Joseph (2012). Moral Fire: Musical Portraits from America's Fin de Siècle. Berkeley: University of California Press. ISBN 978-0-520-26744-2.
- Mueser, Barbara (1975). The Criticism of New Music in New York: 1919–1929 (Ph.D.). New York: University of New York. OCLC 19804587.
- Yellin, Victor Fell (2000) [1999]. "Finck, Henry Theophilus". American National Biography. Oxford: Oxford University Press. doi:10.1093/anb/9780198606697.article.1800391. ISBN 978-0-19-860669-7. (subscription required)
- Rines, George Edwin, ed. (1920). "Finck, Henry Theophilus" . Encyclopedia Americana.
- Wilson, J. G.; Fiske, J., eds. (1900). "Finck, Henry Theophilus" . Appletons' Cyclopædia of American Biography. New York: D. Appleton.
