= Henry Edward Krehbiel =

American musicologist (1854–1923)

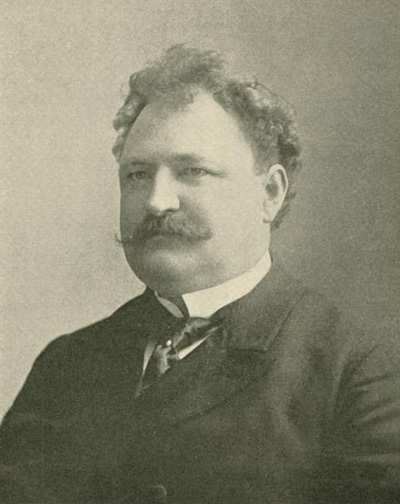
- Born: 10 March 1854; Ann Arbor, Michigan, U.S.
- Died: 20 March 1923 (aged 69); New York, New York, U.S.
- Occupations: Music critic; musicologist
- Notable credits: The New York Tribune; Cincinnati Gazette
- Relatives: Emma Bullet (sister-in-law)

Henry Edward Krehbiel (10 March 1854 – 20 March 1923) was an American music critic and musicologist who was the chief music critic of The New York Tribune for more than forty years. Along with his contemporaries Richard Aldrich, Henry Theophilus Finck, W.J. Henderson and James Huneker, Krehbiel is considered part of the 'Old Guard', a group of leading New York–based music critics who first established a uniquely American school of criticism. A critic with a strong bend towards empiricism, he frequently sought out first-hand experiences, accounts and primary sources when writing; drawing his own conclusions rather than looking to what other writers had already written. A meliorist, Krehbiel believed that the role of criticism was largely to support music that uplifted the human spirit and intellect, and that criticism should serve not only as a means of taste making but also as a mode to educate the public. His book How to Listen to Music (in print from 1896 to 1924) was widely used as an instructional guide by the music consuming public in the United States during the last years of the 19th century and first several decades of the 20th century.

As a critic he was particularly complimentary of German romanticism, and was a great admirer and promoter in the United States of Beethoven, Brahms, Mendelssohn, Schumann, and especially Richard Wagner and his musical theories. He was a close friend and admirer of the conductor Anton Seidl who greatly enhanced his appreciation for Wagner and his music, and whose work he gave his most complimentary reviews. He was not so complimentary to Wagner's main successors: Richard Strauss and Gustav Mahler, and was also critical towards French impressionism and works of the Italian school.

Krehbiel was a champion of the music of Antonín Dvořák whom he hoped would help establish an authentically American school of music when Dvořák was appointed head of the National Conservatory of Music of America in New York City in 1892. Already an admirer of folk music, Krehbiel was inspired by Dvořák's work as a folk song collector and composer, and spent many years researching and collecting folk songs from Americans and immigrants. He collected the folk songs of Magyars, Scandinavians, Russians, Native Americans, and African Americans. This work resulted in numerous publications, including the first music history book published on African-American spirituals: Afro-American folksongs: a study in racial and national music (1914). He also served as annotator for the programs of the concerts by the New York Philharmonic, and translated several German opera libretti for performance or publication in English. He also translated Alexander Wheelock Thayer's seminal three volume German language biography on Beethoven for its 1921 English language publication. Thayer had left a planned fourth volume unwritten at the time of his death, and Krehbiel wrote a fourth volume to complete the series in his final years. It was published posthumously in 1925 for the second publishing of his English translation.

== Biography ==
Krehbiel was born in Ann Arbor, Michigan in 1854, the son of a German clergyman of the Methodist Episcopal Church. A first generation American, he was educated by his father, and grew up in a bilingual household speaking, reading, and writing in both German and English. He later mastered the French, Italian, Russian, and Latin languages. In 1864 his family moved to Cincinnati where his father took up the post of clergyman at a Methodist Church. There, Henry became the conductor of the church's choir while just a youth. In 1872 he began the study of law in Cincinnati, Ohio. In June 1874, he was attached to the staff of the Cincinnati Gazette where he began his career as a writer on sports and crime, reporting mainly on baseball games and murders. He quickly progressed to reporting on music events, and remained with the paper in that post until November 1880.

He then went to New York, where he joined the staff of The New York Tribune, initially as a journalist attached to the city desk who occasionally wrote editorials. As in Cincinnati, he quickly progressed to covering music events and rapidly rose to post of musical editor. He became an influential music critic, writing many articles for the Tribune, Scribner's Monthly, and other journals. In researching his articles, he would often seek out first-hand experiences, and do his own research exhuming primary sources. For example, when writing on Wagner's Die Meistersinger, he traveled to Nuremberg, and when writing on cantorial chant, he attended synagogues.

Krehbiel wrote many books about various aspects of music, including Afro-American folksongs: a study in racial and national music (1914); one of the earliest examinations of African American music. His interest in the music was African-Americans dates back to his attendance of World's Columbian Exposition where he was enthralled with performances of music by black musicians at the Midway Plaisance. He annotated concert programs (including many of Paderewski's recitals).

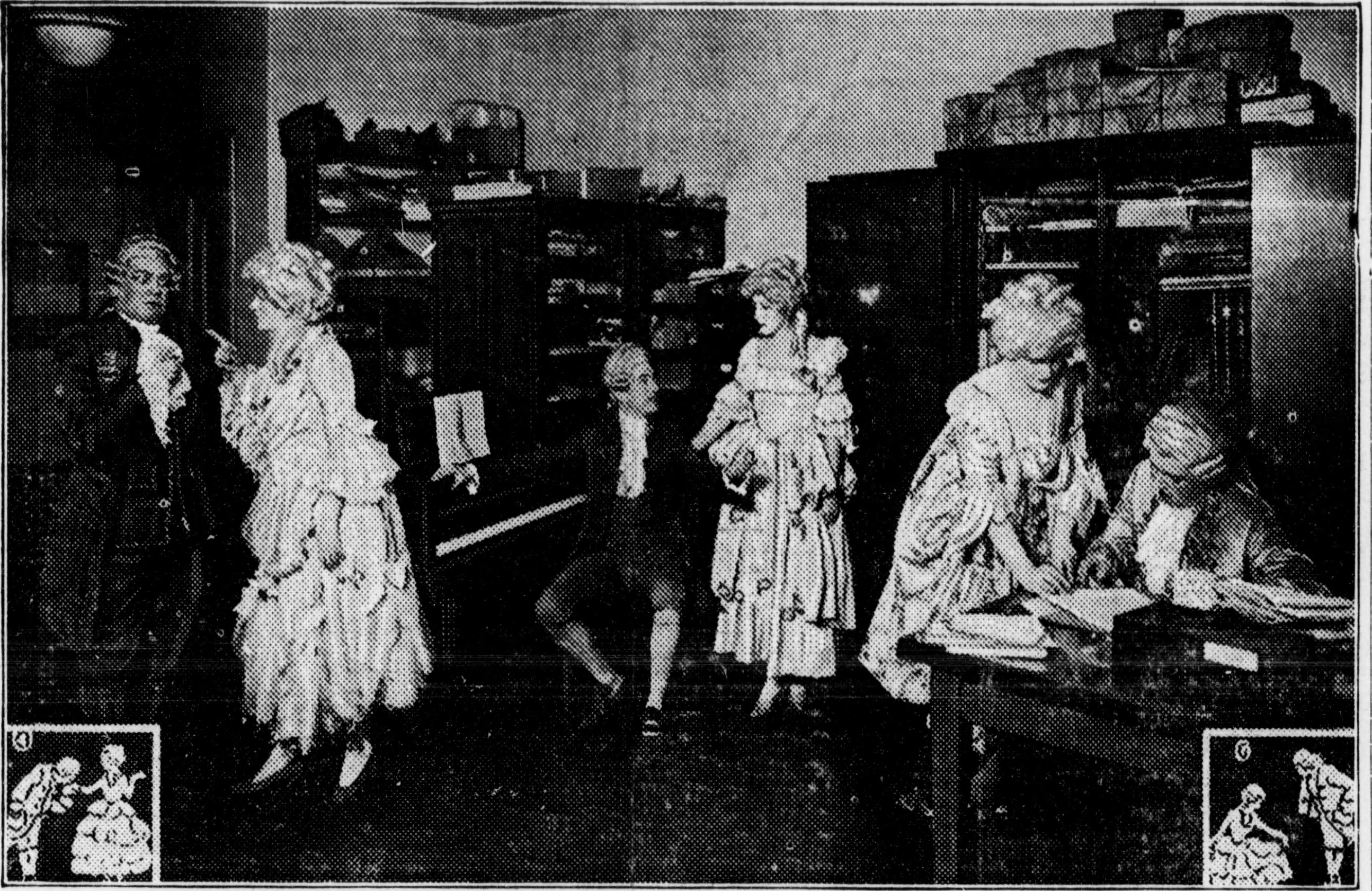
Krehbiel's translation of The Impresario toured the United States in 1921.

Krehbiel translated some opera libretti, including: Nicolai's Die lustigen Weiber von Windsor (1886), Paderewski's Manru (1902), and Mozart's Der Schauspieldirektor (1916). (Dates given are the first performance of the English translation.) When Mozart's Così fan tutte was performed for the first time in the US, in 1922, it was in a new English version with a text by Krehbiel. He also translated the three volume German language biography of Beethoven written by Alexander Wheelock Thayer, for its first English language publication in 1921. A fourth volume had been planned but was left uncompleted by Thayer at the time of his death in 1897. Krehbiel penned his own fourth volume numbering 1,137 pages which was included in the 1925 republication of his English language translation.

Krehbiel was a strong supporter of music by Wagner, Brahms, Dvořák, and Pyotr Ilyich Tchaikovsky when they were not yet well known in America. He detested French music, and together with his assistant, Richard Aldrich, he waged a continuing campaign against it.

When Krehbiel died in March 1923, still in post as critic of The New York Tribune, Aldrich wrote in a tribute that Krehbiel had been "the leading musical critic of America" who raised musical criticism to an eminence it had never previously enjoyed in the US.

== Controversial assessment of Debussy's La Mer ==
After Debussy's La mer was introduced in the US in 1907, Krehbiel wrote:

Last night's concert began with a lot of impressionistic daubs of colour smeared higgledy-piggledy on a tonal palette, with never a thought of form or purpose except to create new combinations of sounds. ... One thing only was certain, and that was that the composer's ocean was a frog-pond, and that some of its denizens had got into the throat of every one of the brass instruments.

It caused some amusement when after Debussy's work became a staple of the orchestral repertoire Krehbiel felt obliged write in 1922 that La mer was "a poetic work in which Debussy has so wondrously caught the rhythms and colors of the seas." He was also highly critical of Gustav Mahler, both as a conductor and composer, once describing him as "a prophet of the ugly", and attacked Strauss for embracing hedonist themes in his works which he viewed as an amoral subject that did not uplift humanity as great music should.

As a music critic himself, Peter Gammond cites this case as illustrative of the profession's fallibility and vulnerability to retrospective judgment. In his commentary on critics, Gammond highlights Krehbiel's drastically contrasting assessments of La Mer—initially dismissive in 1907 and later laudatory in 1922—as emblematic of how critics may later regret early pronouncements. Gammond suggests that such reversals, once committed to print, become permanent fixtures of a critic's legacy, often overshadowing their broader contributions.

== Publications ==
- The Technics of Violin Playing (1880)
- Notes on the cultivation of choral music and the Oratorio Society of New York (1884)
- Studies in the Wagnerian drama (1891)
- How to listen to music; hints and suggestions to untaught lovers of the art (1896)
- Music and manners from Pergolese to Beethoven (1898) – essays
- Famous songs; standard songs by the best composers (1903) – editor/compiler, in four volumes
- Chapters of opera (1908) – revised 1911
- A Book of operas (1909)
- Pianoforte and its music (1911)
- Afro-American folksongs: a study in racial and national music (1914)
- A second book of operas (1917)
- More chapters of opera (1919)
- The life of Ludwig van Beethoven, by Alexander Wheelock Thayer (1921) – Edited by Krehbiel

== Sources ==
- Horowtiz, Joseph (2001). "Krehbiel, Henry". Grove Music Online. Oxford: Oxford University Press. doi:10.1093/gmo/9781561592630.article.15502. ISBN 978-1-56159-263-0. (subscription, Wikilibrary access, or UK public library membership required)
- Horowtiz, Joseph (2012). Moral Fire: Musical Portraits from America's Fin de Siècle. Berkeley: University of California Press. ISBN 978-0-520-26744-2.
- Leary, William G.; James Steel Smith (1955). Thought and Statement. New York: Harcourt, Brace. OCLC 937334460.
- Mueser, Barbara (1975). The Criticism of New Music in New York: 1919–1929 (Ph.D.). New York: University of New York. OCLC 19804587.
