= Eric Blom =

British musicologist (1888–1959)

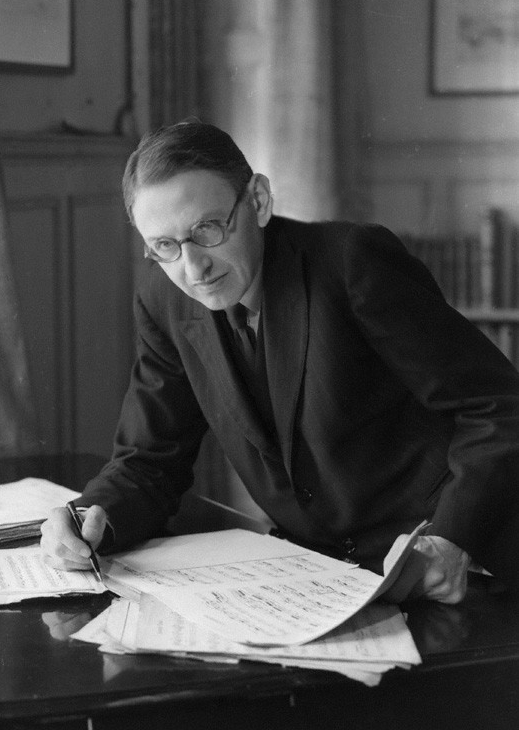
- Blom in 1942
- Born: 20 August 1888; Bern, Switzerland
- Died: 11 April 1959 (aged 70)

Eric Walter Blom CBE (20 August 1888 – 11 April 1959) was a British music lexicographer, music critic and writer. He is best known as the editor of the 5th edition of Grove's Dictionary of Music and Musicians (1954).

== Early life ==
Blom was born in Bern, Switzerland. His father was of Danish and British descent, and his mother was Swiss. He was educated in German-speaking Switzerland, and later in England. He was largely self-taught in music. He started in music journalism by assisting Rosa Newmarch in writing program notes for Sir Henry J. Wood's Prom Concerts, which were notable for their abundance of accurate information. From 1923 to 1931 he was the London music correspondent for the Manchester Guardian. He then went to the Birmingham Post (1931–46, succeeding A J Sheldon), and returned to London in 1949, as music critic for The Observer. He retired as chief music critic for The Observer in 1953, but still wrote weekly contributions right up till his death.

== Grove and Everyman's Dictionary ==
He was the editor of Music & Letters from 1937 to 1950, and again from 1954 until his death. He withdrew in 1950 because of his preoccupation with the preparation of Grove's Dictionary. He returned in 1954 only because the proprietor and then-editor, Richard Capell, died. In his capacity as musical adviser to the Dent publishing firm, he also edited the Master Musicians series, of which he wrote "Mozart". He discovered a number of young authors and gave them their first opportunities to write music biography.

Eric Blom's first lexicographical work was Everyman's Dictionary of Music (first published by J. M. Dent in 1946), which went through several editions (it was revised in 1988 by D. Cummings as The New Everyman Dictionary of Music).

He succeeded H. C. Colles as editor of Grove's Dictionary for the 5th edition (usually referred to as "Grove V"). Colles had confined the dictionary to five and six volumes for Grove III and IV respectively (1927, 1940). Blom expanded it to nine volumes for Grove V (1954). As well his overall editing responsibilities, Blom personally wrote hundreds of entries, including Arthur Sullivan. He also translated many entries by foreign contributors (he was fluent in German, Danish, Italian and French as well as English). A Supplementary Volume was published in 1961, after Blom's death, but he had done most of the work on it. His introduction and acknowledgments were included, and he is credited as editor, with Denis Stevens as associate editor. His own biography, written by Frank Howes (the chief music critic of The Times), appeared in the Supplementary Volume. Grove V was reprinted in 1966, 1968, 1970, 1973 and 1975, and remained the standard edition of Grove until the New Grove was released in 1980.

== Opinions ==
Blom was forthright in his opinions. He could be almost gushing about his favourites, particularly Mozart, and most especially his operas. He wrote that Benjamin Britten's Peter Grimes was "so impressive and original that only the most absurd prejudice will keep it out of the great foreign opera houses". Equally, he did not shrink from criticising composers he thought less of, and introduced some of his own prejudices. He was capable of uniquely insightful comments on well-known works in which he held a minority opinion; e.g., that the solo part of the Sibelius Violin Concerto "is closely interwoven with the symphonic tissue, and is therefore neglected by the average virtuoso" (even though it is in fact one of the most popular and frequently played and recorded of all violin concertos). Even more notoriously, he wrote that Rachmaninoff "did not have the individuality of Taneyev or Medtner. Technically he was highly gifted, but also severely limited. His music is ... monotonous in texture ... The enormous popular success some few of Rakhmaninov's works had in his lifetime is not likely to last, and musicians never regarded it with much favour". To this, Harold C. Schonberg, New York critic not immune to snobbery of his own, in his Lives of the Great Composers, responded with equally outspoken unfairness, "It is one of the most outrageously snobbish and even stupid statements ever to be found in a work that is supposed to be an objective reference".

== Other work ==
Blom translated many documents for Otto Erich Deutsch's Mozart: A Documentary Biography (published 1965). He assisted Gervase Hughes in the writing of his book The Music of Arthur Sullivan. In 1956, for the Mozart bicentenary, he published some of Mozart's letters translated by Emily Anderson.

In 1941 Blom wrote a detective novel, Death on the Down Beat, using the pseudonym Sebastian Farr. The novel concerns the shooting of a conductor during a performance of Strauss’s Ein Heldenleben. The book was republished in 2022 under the British Library Crime Classics imprint.

== Personal life ==
Blom married Marjory Spencer in 1923. She died in 1952. There was one son Michael Blom who designed many of Massey Ferguson’s best selling post war tractors, and one daughter, Celia, who married the author Paul Jennings and illustrated some of his books. Once back in London at the end of the 1940s, Blom's address was 10 Alma Terrace, Allen Street in Kensington. He died on 11 April 1959. He had requested that at his funeral, the organist play J.S. Bach's final chorale prelude Vor Deinen Thron tret' ich zu Dir (I step before Thy throne, O Lord). Unfortunately, 'Bach chorale' was misunderstood, and the laughably incongruous "Barcarolle" from Offenbach's The Tales of Hoffmann was played instead.

== Writings ==
His other books include:

- Stepchildren of Music (1923)
- The Romance of the Piano (1927)
- A General Index to Modern Musical Literature in the English Language (1927; this indexes periodicals for the years 1915–26)
- The Limitations of Music (1928)
- Mozart (1935; part of the Master Musicians series)
- Beethoven's Pianoforte Sonatas Discussed (1938)
- A Musical Postbag (1941; collected essays)
- Music in England (1942; rev. 1947)
- Some Great Composers (1944)
- Classics, Major and Minor, with Some Other Musical Ruminations (London, 1958)
- Translated Richard Specht's Johannes Brahms: Leben und Werk eines deutschen Meisters
- Translated Weissman's Music Come to Earth
- Translated the libretto of Mozart's Die Entführung aus dem Serail, which he rendered as The Elopement from the Harem
- Tchaikovsky Orchestral Works
- Piano Music of Beethoven
- The Trouble Factory
- The Music Lover's Miscellany
- Schubert
- Strauss: The Rose Cavalier
- Diccionario de la Musica
- Bach (The Mayfair Biographies)
- "Delius and America", in The Musical Quarterly
- Blom contributed the article on Arthur Sullivan in the International Cyclopaedia of Music and Musicians (New York, 1939)
- He revised H. C. Colles's "The Growth of Music: a Study in Musical History" (1959)

== Sources ==
- Frank Howes, "Blom, Eric (Walter)" in Grove's Dictionary of Music and Musicians, 5th edition, Supplementary Volume, 1961
