= Imogen Cooper =

English pianist

Dame Imogen Cooper, DBE (born 28 August 1949) is an English pianist.

== Biography ==
Cooper was born in North London, daughter of the musicologist Martin du Pré Cooper and artist Mary Stewart. She grew up surrounded by music through her parents and her older siblings: Felicity, Josephine and Dominic Cooper. Realising that Imogen had an exceptional musical talent her parents sent her at the age of 12 to Paris to study for six years at the Conservatoire National Supérieur de Musique (CNSM) with Jacques Février, Yvonne Lefébure and Germaine Mounier. This was considered a provocative move by the music establishment, and there was a lengthy correspondence in The Times between Thomas Armstrong, Principal of the Royal Academy of Music in London, and Martin Cooper, arguing the pros and cons of taking a gifted child out of conventional education to specialise so early, and in a foreign country.

In 1967 at the age of 17, the CNSM awarded her a Premier Prix de Piano, a major distinction. Cooper was mentored in her late teens by Arthur Rubinstein and Clifford Curzon, and subsequently studied in Vienna with Alfred Brendel, Paul Badura-Skoda and Jörg Demus, particularly in her early twenties by Brendel, an experience that has resonated with her throughout her performing life. Apart from spending her teenage years in Paris, London has been Cooper's principal residence.

She is particularly known for her interpretations of Schubert and Schumann, but she has also been involved in modern music, giving the premières of works such as Traced Overhead by Thomas Adès. As well as performing as soloist she participates in chamber music and lieder, and has had a long-standing partnership with baritone Wolfgang Holzmair.

She was appointed Commander of the Order of the British Empire (CBE) in the 2007 New Year Honours and Dame Commander of the Order of the British Empire (DBE) in the 2021 Birthday Honours for services to music. She was awarded the Queen's Medal for Music in 2019. In January 2026, she announced that she would retire following a 13-month farewell tour around Europe.

== Discography ==
- Robert and Clara Schumann Lieder: with Wolfgang Holzmair (Philips /462-610-2, 2002)
- Eichendorff Lieder: with Wolfgang Holzmair (Philips/464-991-2, 2002)
- Mozart: Piano concertos 23 and 9 (Avie/AV2100, 2006)
- Wolf Songs (Wigmore Hall Live/WHLIVE0029, 2009)
- Mozart: Piano concertos 22 and 18 (Avie/AV2200, 2010)
- Schubert: Song Cycles with Wolfgang Holzmair (Decca Box set/CD0289 478 42729, 2012)
- Schumann: Davidsbündlertänze, etc. (Chandos/CHAN10874, 2015)
- Imogen Cooper's Chopin (Chandos/CHAN10902, 2016)
- Liszt and Wagner (Chandos/CHAN10938. 2017)
- Beethoven: Diabelli Variations (Chandos/CHAN20085, 2018)
- Iberia y Francia (Chandos/CHAN20119, 2019)
- Le Temps Perdu (Chandos/CHAN20235, 2021)
- Beethoven: The Last Three Sonatas (Chandos/CHAN20362, 2026)

== Honours and awards ==
- 1969: The London Mozart Players' Mozart Memorial Prize
- 1997: Hon. Member of the Royal Academy of Music
- 1999: Hon. Doctor of Music at Exeter University
- 2007: New Year Honours, CBE (Commander of the Order of the British Empire) for services to music
- 2008: Royal Philharmonic Society Music Award
- 2008: Mentor on the RPS Philip Langridge mentoring scheme
- 2012–13: Humanitas – Visiting Professor in Classical Music and Music Education at the University of Oxford.
- 2019: The Queen's Medal for Music
- 2021: Appointed to chair the Leeds International Piano Competition jury
- 2021: Birthday Honours, DBE (Dame Commander of the Order of the British Empire) for services to music
- 2024: Fellow of the Royal Northern College of Music
