= Mary Miller (artistic director) =

Scottish violinist and opera manager

Mary Miller is general and artistic director at the Bergen National Opera, in Bergen, Norway.

She began her career as concert violinist, working internationally until 1990. She became chief music critic of Scotland's national newspaper, The Scotsman, while directing the UK's first Nordic festival, based in Northern Scotland. She produced and presented for the BBC Radio 3 before leading the development of new work for English National Opera between 1998 and 2001. In 2001 she moved to the US to direct the International Festival of Arts and Ideas in Connecticut, returning to Europe in 2005 as CEO and artistic director of the Stavanger2008, European Capital of Culture 2008. She wrote the Spanish city of Burgos's bid to be European Capital of Culture for 2016.
