= Richard Dyer (music critic) =

American music critic (1941–2024)

- Born: December 29, 1941; Mineral Wells, Texas, U.S.
- Died: September 20, 2024 (aged 82); Boston, Massachusetts, U.S.
- Education: Hiram College; Harvard University
- Occupation: Music critic
- Notable credits: The Boston Globe; The New York Times

Richard M. Dyer (December 29, 1941 – September 20, 2024) was an American music critic who specialized in classical music. Described by the music critic Alex Ross as "a dean of the profession", from 1976 to 2006 he was the chief classical music critic of The Boston Globe.

Educated with degrees in English, Dyer had studied piano and was an opera enthusiast since his youth. He embarked on music criticism following a well-received 1973 article in The New York Times on the soprano Renata Tebaldi, and soon joined the staff of the Globe. A diverse critic, his writings extended to numerous other news publications, as well as music encyclopedias, liner notes and program notes. Dyer served on the juries of many piano competitions, and lectured at a number of universities.

== Early life and education ==
Born in Mineral Wells, Texas, on December 29, 1941, Richard M. Dyer was raised first in Enid, Oklahoma, and later in Hiram, Ohio. In his youth he was an avid opera enthusiast, and played the piano. He attended Hiram College, graduating in 1963 summa cum laude, with a Bachelor of Arts in English and minor in French. During his time at Hiram, Dyer studied piano with Beatrice Erdely at the Cleveland Institute of Music. He continued his piano study in Paris at the Institute of European Studies, studying with Jacqueline Eymar from 1961 to 1962. While in Paris, Dyer attended the final masterclasses of Alfred Cortot. At Harvard University, he graduated with a Master's degree in English, and began teaching the subject at the University of Iowa. He soon returned to Harvard, however, being appointed the Briggs-Copeland Lecturer in English, continuing work on his PhD in English (1973) with a dissertation on the writer Oliver Goldsmith. The work was left incomplete with his move to fulltime journalism.

== Career and later life ==
While studying for his PhD, Dyer received nationwide attention for his 1973 article in The New York Times concerning the soprano Renata Tebaldi's "artistic decline". The article was highly praised, and Dyer joined The Boston Globe that year to work as a music critic under the critic Michael Steinberg. Dyer later reflected on joining the Globe, noting that it was "an unexpected sidestep into journalism"; when Steinberg left the paper in 1976, he succeeded him as chief classical music critic. In addition to the Times and Globe, his music criticism spans numerous other publications: American Music, Opera, Opera News, High Fidelity, Ovation, Symphony Magazine, Chamber Music, Gramophone, Musical America, The Connoisseur, The Nation and the Chicago Tribune.

Grove described his criticism as "demonstrat[ing] penetrating insight and a highly sensitive ear to subtleties of performance, especially with regard to the piano." ASCAP awarded him the Deems Taylor Award twice for his music criticism. Dyer stepped down as chief classical music critic at The Boston Globe in 2006, being succeeded by Jeremy Eichler. Reflecting on Dyer's retirement, the music critic Alex Ross noted that Dyer was "a dean of the profession" and that "no critic writes with more authority or passion." Dyer died in Boston on September 20, 2024, at the age of 82.

Dyer's writings extended beyond music criticism, to encyclopedias, liner notes and program notes. His contributions to music encyclopedias, include articles in The New Grove Dictionary of Music and Musicians (and the subsequent Grove Music Online), the Metropolitan Opera Encyclopedia and the Encyclopedia Americana. He wrote liner notes including those for Deutsche Grammophon, New World Record, Philips, RCA Victor, Sony Classical and Westminster Classics, while orchestras that he wrote program notes for include the Boston Symphony Orchestra, the Chamber Music Society of Lincoln Center, the Metropolitan Opera and the San Francisco Opera. Dyer also toured five times with Benjamin Zander and the Boston Philharmonic Youth Orchestra as a blogger for the orchestra. Other topics of interest in his writings include literature and film; he was film critic at the Globe for a year.

Due to his experience and familiarity with piano and piano repertoire, Dyer was a jury member for numerous piano competitions. These include the Cleveland International Piano Competition, Sendai International Music Competition, Toronto International Piano Competition and Van Cliburn International Piano Competition. Since retirement from the Globe, he taught at the Tanglewood Music Center and in Dawn Upshaw's graduate program at Bard College. He also lectured at the Aspen Music Festival, Boston University, the Juilliard School and the New England Conservatory. He received honorary doctorates from both the New England Conservatory of Music and Salem State University. Other activities of Dyer's included writing podcasts for the Boston Symphony Orchestra each week and (after his retirement) occasional contributions to the Boston Musical Intelligencer.

== Selected writings ==
- Dyer, Richard (April 29, 1973). "We Love You Renata But..." The New York Times.
- —— (February 24, 1998). "Sounds Of Spielberg At Work Again, He And John Williams Exult In Their Admiring Duet Of 25 Years". The Boston Globe. p. C1. ProQuest 403934546.
- —— (September 24, 2006). "One Thing is Certain: Music Has a future". Boston.com. Archived from the original on December 17, 2015.
- —— (March–April 2011). "Pizzazz on the Podium". Harvard Magazine.
- —— (August 20, 2012). "Lieberson's voice, husband's music make lovely pairing". The Boston Globe.
- —— (October 1, 2019). "BPO Introduces Italian Pianist in BPC2". The Boston Musical Intelligencer.
