= Alec Robertson (music critic) =

British writer, broadcaster and music critic

- Born: 3 June 1892
- Died: 18 January 1982 (aged 89)
- Occupations: Writer; broadcaster; music critic

Alec Robertson, MBE (3 June 1892, Southsea – 18 January 1982, Midhurst) was a British writer, broadcaster and music critic. He wrote music criticism for Gramophone for more than 50 years, beginning with the magazine's very first issue in 1923. He later served as that magazine's music editor from 1952 to 1972. Ho joined the Gramophone Department of the BBC in 1940, and worked as producer of music talks on the Home and Third programmes, retiring from the BBC in 1952.

In 1950, Robertson succeeded Ralph Hill as editor of Music, the annual Pelican book series, having previously written a record review column for its predecessor, Penguin Music Magazine. He also wrote for The Catholic Herald, and The Tablet.

He appeared as a castaway on the BBC Radio programme Desert Island Discs on 3 June 1957, and again on 3 June 1972.

Robertson was educated at Bradfield College and the Royal Academy of Music. He was named a fellow of the latter institution in 1946. In 1972, he was made a Member of the Order of the British Empire.

== Bibliography ==
- Robertson, Alec. Brahms. Novello's Biographies of Great Musicians (16-page booklet).
- Robertson, Alec (1957). Chamber Music.
- Robertson, Alec (1961). Music of the Catholic Church. Burns & Oates.
- Robertson, Alec (1969). The Pelican History of Music: 3: Classical and Romantic. Pelican Books. ISBN 978-0140204940.
- Robertson, Alec (1974). Dvorak (Master Musician). Everyman Ltd. ISBN 978-0460031165.
- Robertson, Alec (1977). Bach: A Biography. Shoe String Press. ISBN 978-0208010551.
- Robertson, Alec (1977). Requiem: Music of Mourning and Consolation. Greenwood Press. ISBN 978-0837185521.
