= Anton Seidl =

Hungarian-American conductor (1850–1898)

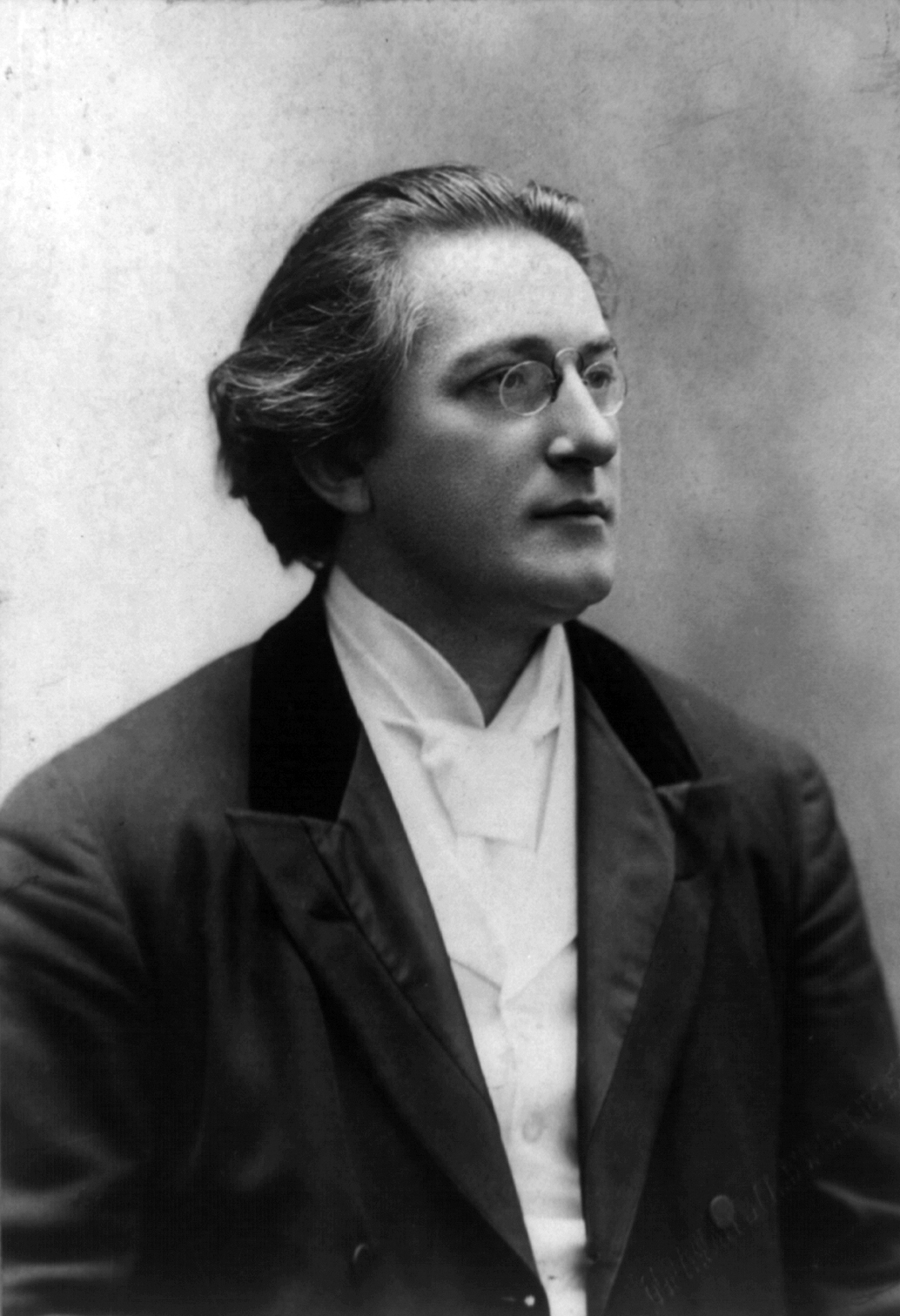
Anton Seidl, 1895

Anton Seidl (7 May 1850 – 28 March 1898) was a Hungarian conductor, best known for his collaboration with Richard Wagner and conducting his operas, and for his association with the Metropolitan Opera in New York City and the New York Philharmonic.

== Biography ==
He was born in Pest, Austria-Hungary, where he began the study of music at a very early age. When only seven years old, he could pick out at the piano melodies which he had heard in the theatre. At 15, he became a student of harmony and counterpoint under Nicolitsch. He attended the normal school at Pest for three years, the gymnasium for eight years. At age 16 he had been thinking of becoming a priest. Seidl entered the Royal University of Pest, but his love for music prevailed and he left the university two years later to go to Leipzig, where he studied at the Leipzig Conservatory from October 1870, remaining there until 1872, when he was summoned to Bayreuth as one of Richard Wagner's copyists.

At Bayreuth, he assisted in making the first fair copy of Der Ring des Nibelungen. Wagner treated him as one of the "chosen few", and it was natural that he should take a part in the first Bayreuth Festival in 1876. Wagner then sent him to Vienna to stage Siegfried and Götterdämmerung there, the last two of his operatic tetralogy, Der Ring des Nibelungen.

His chance as a conductor came in 1879 when, on Wagner's recommendation, he was appointed to the Leipzig State Opera. In May 1881, he introduced at the Victoria Theatre, Berlin, the complete Ring tetralogy for the first time. In 1882, he went on tour with Angelo Neumann's Nibelungen Ring company. The critics attributed much of the artistic success that attended the production of the Ring at Her Majesty's Theatre, London, in June of that year to his conducting. In 1883 Seidl went with Neumann to Bremen, and in 1884 he married Auguste Kraus in Frankfurt, a distinguished singer of the German Opera Company.

In 1885, after Leopold Damrosch's death, Seidl accepted the first conductor's position of the German opera in New York, then domiciled at the Metropolitan Opera House, where Seidl made his debut with Wagner's Lohengrin on 23 November 1885.

Seidl, as celebrated conductor of the musical life in New York, became the music director of the New York Philharmonic (NYP) in 1891, where he remained until his death in 1898. During his tenure, the philharmonic enjoyed a period of unprecedented success and prosperity. Under his baton the orchestra played for the first time in Carnegie Hall on 18 November 1892. While in New York, he conducted the world premiere of Antonín Dvořák's Symphony No. 9, "From the New World", which greatly influenced the direction of American classical music. Dvořák had added that subtitle to the title page of his autograph score in Carnegie Hall just before turning it over to Seidl. Seidl frequently collaborated with choral conductor William Rogers Chapman who choirs often performed with the NYP. Seidl also taught Chapman conducting and music composition, and the two men became close friends.

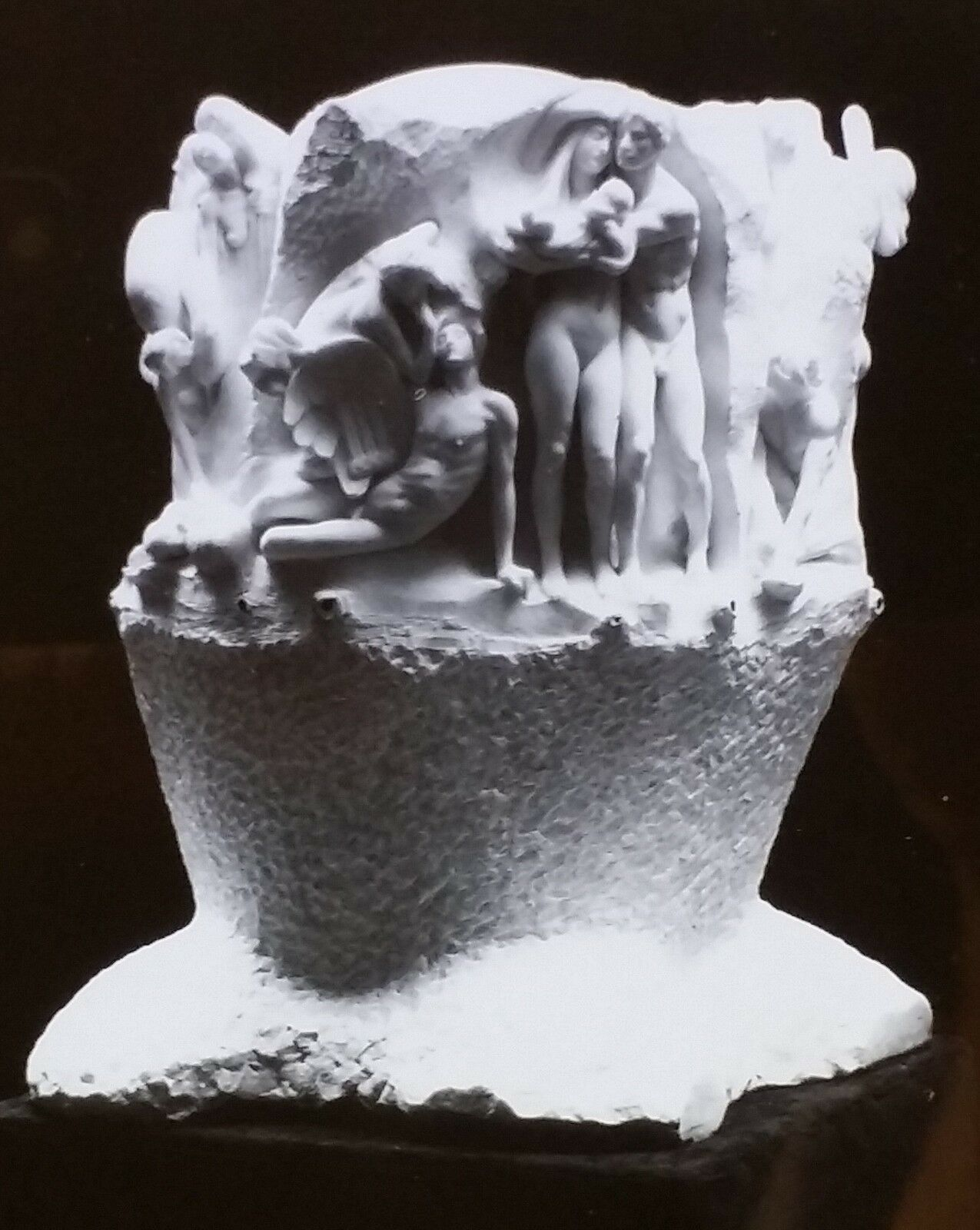
Urn of Life

He also had a significant role in the genesis of Edvard Grieg's Lyric Suite. It started as Seidl's orchestrations of four pieces from Book V of Grieg's Lyric Pieces, which he put together as Norwegian Suite. While Grieg acknowledged the merit of the arrangements, he nevertheless chose to revise them in 1905, and published three of them, along with an arrangement of a fourth piece he made himself directly from the original piano score, into his own Lyric Suite.

On March 28, 1898, Seidl died from food poisoning (then erroneously called "ptomaine poisoning") reportedly caused from eating a serving of tainted fish. He was 47 years old. Several thousand people attended the memorial, held at the Metropolitan Opera House, with the cremation following in Fresh Pond, Queens. He was an atheist.

=== Urn of Life ===
Seidl's friends and colleagues commissioned sculptor George Grey Barnard to create a marble burial urn to hold the conductor's ashes. After Seidl's widow declined the large ornate urn, Barnard carved a smaller, simplified version, which now holds both their ashes. The unused Urn of Life was sold by Barnard in 1919 to the Carnegie Museum of Art in Pittsburgh, Pennsylvania.

== Notes ==
Sources

- Finck, Henry T., ed. (1899). Anton Seidl: A Memorial by His Friends. Charles Scribner's Sons – via Internet Archive.
  - Finck, Henry T. "Marriage". In Finck (1899), pp. 27–28.
  - Krehbiehl, H. E. "Appreciations by Musical Critics". In Finck (1899), p. 132.
