= Jeremy Eichler =

American music critic and cultural historian (born 1974)

- Born: Jeremy Adam Eichler; August 13, 1974 (age 52); Boston, Massachusetts
- Education: Brown University; Columbia University
- Occupations: Music critic; cultural historian
- Known for: Time's Echo (2023)
- Notable credits: The Boston Globe; The New York Times
- Awards: Ralph Waldo Emerson Prize Other awards
- Website: jeremy-eichler.com

Jeremy Eichler (born August 13, 1974) is an American music critic and cultural historian. He teaches at Tufts University, and from 2006 to 2024 he was the chief classical music critic of The Boston Globe.

Eichler’s book Time’s Echo: Music, Memory, and the Second World War (2023) has garnered wide recognition. Named “History Book of the Year” by the Sunday Times, it also received the Ralph Waldo Emerson Prize and three National Jewish Book Awards.

== Life and career ==
Jeremy Adam Eichler was born on August 13, 1974. Growing up in Newton, Massachusetts, he played violin and viola in his youth, playing the latter in youth orchestras. He received an undergraduate degree from Brown University, where he co-founded the Nahanni String Quartet.

"Here is where critics can and must contribute. In such a fiercely capitalist society, one now endlessly addled by digital distraction, critics can strive... to help make the gift [of art] legible, make it tangible, make it real, understood, and felt. Adapting a phrase from the violinist Isaac Stern, they can explore not only how we listen — but why."

— Jeremy Eichler, June 2024
In The Boston Globe

Eichler worked as a freelance journalist in New York, contributing to numerous publications including The New Republic, The Nation and The New Yorker, and in 2003 began writing music criticism for The New York Times. He then succeeded Richard Dyer as chief classical music critic of The Boston Globe in 2006, where Eichler wrote about local, national and international events for nearly two decades. His column, titled "Third Ear", connected "music with broader worlds of history, politics, and culture." The historian Lizabeth Cohen said of Eichler’s criticism, “In his hands, cultural history and music criticism become entryways to better understandings of the past and the present.”

Eichler is also a cultural historian. He earned a doctorate in history from Columbia University; his doctoral dissertation was on the composer Arnold Schoenberg. Published in 2015, the topic in discussion was Schoenberg's A Survivor from Warsaw, a large-scale cantata that was the earliest Holocaust musical memorial from a major composer. His dissertation won Columbia's Salo and Jeanette Baron Prize for Jewish Studies.

Eichler's 2023 book Time's Echo explores "how music acts as a witness to history and a medium of cultural memory." According to Eichler, it invites readers to consider how "classical music in particular can serve as a gateway to the past, deepening our sense of understanding, empathy, and felt contact with history." The narrative focuses on the era of the Second World War and the Holocaust, and among the works discussed are Benjamin Britten's War Requiem, Dmitri Shostakovich's Symphony No. 13, Babi Yar and Metamorphosen by Richard Strauss. It was published by Alfred A. Knopf and Faber and Faber in North America and the United Kingdom respectively, and has been translated into ten languages. In 2024-25, Eichler served as the first Writer-in-Residence of the London Philharmonic Orchestra, which devoted its season to exploring the relationship between music and memory.

== Awards and honors ==
ASCAP awarded Eichler the Deems Taylor Award for Music Criticism in 2013. He has received fellowships from the Radcliffe Institute for Advanced Studies of Harvard University and the National Endowment for the Humanities.

In addition to receiving the Ralph Waldo Emerson Prize and three National Jewish Book Awards, Time's Echo was named “History Book of the Year” by the Sunday Times and described as “the outstanding music book of this and several years” by the Times Literary Supplement. It was shortlisted for the 2023 Baillie Gifford Prize, considered the UK's premier annual prize for non-fiction books.

== Selected writings ==
- Eichler, Jeremy (2015). The Emancipation of Memory: Arnold Schoenberg and the Creation of 'A Survivor from Warsaw' (Ph.D.). New York: Columbia University. OCLC 982310805.
- —— (2023). Time's Echo: The Second World War, the Holocaust, and the Music of Remembrance. New York: Alfred A. Knopf. ISBN 978-0-525-52171-6.

=== Articles ===
- Eichler, Jeremy (October 30, 2005). "Dispatches From Between Two Notes". The New York Times.
- —— (August 20, 2012). "String Theorist". The New Yorker.
- —— (October 27, 2012). "Composed in Marble". The Boston Globe. Reprinted as "Beethoven wandering" on Eichler's website.
