= Emma Bullet =

French-American journalist (1842–1914)

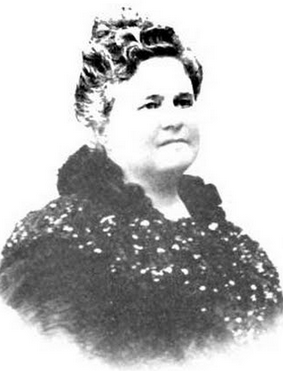
- Emma Bullet, from a 1906 publication
- Born: 1842; Belfort, France
- Died: January 31, 1914 (aged 71–72); Paris, France
- Occupation(s): Journalist, foreign correspondent, canteen worker, educator
- Relatives: Henry Edward Krehbiel (brother-in-law)

Emma Bullet (1842 – January 31, 1914) was a French-born American journalist, the Paris correspondent of the Brooklyn Daily Eagle for 32 years. She also taught school in Ohio, and was a canteen worker during the Franco-Prussian War.

== Early life and education ==
Bullet was born in 1842, in Belfort and moved the United States at age 7. Her mother was a French teacher.

== Career ==
Bullet taught French at the Ohio Female College in Cincinnati and at a school in Paris as a young woman. She and her mother ran a "coffee shack" on Montmartre during the Franco-Prussian War.

From 1879 to 1882, Bullet wrote for the Cincinnati Commercial Gazette. In 1882, she became the "graphic, unconventional, breezy" Paris correspondent of the Brooklyn Daily Eagle, a role she held for 32 years. She reported on Parisian fashion, and from Queen Victoria's jubilee in London in 1897. She interviewed William Jennings Bryan in 1906. In 1907, the newspaper published her autobiography in serial format, and in 1908 published it as a special pamphlet, in observance of her 30th year as their Paris correspondent, and she was honored at a dinner in Brooklyn by her colleagues at the Eagle. She was a member of the Paris Press Club.

Bullet's home in Paris was described as a weekly "salon" frequented by "the leaders in the world of literature, art, and music in Paris", especially Americans such as sculptor Frederick William MacMonnies and opera singer Emma Nevada. She was "one of the best known and most representative of American women in Paris," according to an 1893 profile.

== Publications ==
- "Emma Bullet's Budget from Paris" (1900)
- "A Letter from Abroad" (1911)

== Personal life ==
Bullet was in the United States for several months in 1908, and stayed with her sister Marie in Maine, New York, and Ohio. Her sister was married to music critic Henry Edward Krehbiel. She died in 1914, at her home in Paris, in her seventies. "She combined an understanding of America and the Americans with a sureness and keenness of perception which made her letters from the French capital authoritative, comprehensive and interesting," commented the Brooklyn Times at the time of her death.
