= Music & Letters =

- Discipline: Musicology
- Language: English

Publication details
- History: 1920-present
- Publisher: Oxford University Press

Standard abbreviations
- ISO 4: Music Lett.

Indexing
- ISSN: 0027-4224

Links
- Journal homepage

Music & Letters is an academic journal published quarterly by Oxford University Press with a focus on musicology. The journal sponsors the Music & Letters Trust, which makes twice-yearly cash awards of variable amounts to support research in the music field.

A. H. Fox Strangways established the journal in 1920 and served as editor-in-chief until 1937. Eric Blom served as editor from 1937 to 1950 and again from 1954 to 1959. Other editors-in-chief have included Richard Capell (1950–54), J.A. Westrup (1959–76), Denis Arnold and Edward Olleson (1976–80), Nigel Fortune and Olleson (1981–6), Fortune and John Whenham (1986–92), and Fortune and Tim Carter (1992–9). Nigel Fortune continued as co-editor until 2008.
