= Mosco Carner =

- Born: Mosco Cohen; 15 November 1904; Vienna (Austria)
- Died: 3 August 1985 (aged 80); Stratton, Cornwall (UK)
- Education: PhD University of Vienna
- Occupations: Musicologist and conductor
- Known for: Studies of Giacomo Puccini and Alban Berg

Mosco Carner (born Mosco Cohen) (15 November 1904 – 3 August 1985) was an Austrian-born British musicologist, conductor and critic. He wrote on a wide range of music subjects, but was particularly known for his studies on the life and works of the composers Giacomo Puccini and Alban Berg.

== Biography ==
Born in Vienna to Rudolf and Selma Cohen, Carner was educated at the Vienna Conservatory and at the University of Vienna, where he studied musicology under Guido Adler. He received his doctorate there in 1928, with a dissertation on the sonata form in the works of Robert Schumann. He then worked as an opera conductor in Opava (now in the Czech Republic) from 1929 to 1930 and in the Free City of Danzig from 1930 to 1933. In 1933, he settled in London (using a tourist visa to get there) where he was to live for the rest of his life. In London, he initially worked as a guest conductor for the Royal Philharmonic Orchestra, BBC Symphony Orchestra, and London Symphony Orchestra and as a free-lance music correspondent for several continental European papers. For a brief period in 1948 he was guest conductor with the Radio Éireann Symphony Orchestra. He went on to become the music critic for the British magazine Time and Tide (1949–1962) and the London Evening News (1957 to 1961). He was also a frequent contributor to The Times and the Daily Telegraph. In the 1950s he wrote a music column for ArtReview, then titled Art News and Review.

Like many émigré musicians at the time, Carner was interned as an 'enemy alien' in 1939. But a year later he became a naturalised British subject, and in 1944 married the composer and pianist Helen Lucas Pyke (1905–1954). In the 1940s he also began publishing scholarly articles and monographs, most notably Volume 2 of A Study of Twentieth-Century Harmony in 1944 (Volume 1 was written by René Lenormand). In 1958, he published one of his most important works, Puccini: a Critical Biography. The book was dedicated to the memory of his wife, Helen, who had died four years before. Translated into several languages, and published in multiple editions (the last revised edition was published posthumously in 1992), it was described by Stanley Sadie in the 2001 edition of The New Grove Dictionary of Music and Musicians as having "long stood as the most important book on Puccini in English." Carner also edited a volume of Puccini's letters as well as writing two volumes on Puccini's operas for the Cambridge Opera Handbooks series, Madame Butterfly (1979), and Tosca (1985). Another key work by Carner was his 1975 Alban Berg: the Man and his Work. Carner also published two collections of essays and reviews, Of Men and Music (1944) and Major and Minor (1980).

Mosco Carner died of a heart attack at the age of 80 while on vacation in Stratton, Cornwall. He was survived by his second wife, Hazel Carner (née Sebag-Montefiore), whom he had married in 1976. Hazel Carner wrote the preface to and helped prepare the third edition of Puccini: a Critical Biography which contains the revisions and additions that Carner had left at the time of his death.

== Selected bibliography ==
- Dvořák in Biographies of Great Musicians series, Novello, n.d.
- "The Church Music" in Antonin Dvořák: his Achievement, V. Fischl (ed.), Lindsay Drummond, 1942
- A Study of Twentieth-Century Harmony, Vol. 2, Joseph Williams, 1944
- Of Men and Music (collection of essays), Joseph Williams, 1944
- The Waltz (Vol. 5 of The World of Music), Parrish, 1948
- "Béla Bartók" in The Concerto, Ralph Hill (ed.), Pelican Press, 1952
- "Béla Bartók" in Chamber Music, A. Robertson (ed.), The White Friars Press. 1957
- Puccini: a Critical Biography, Gerald Duckworth, 1958; second edition, Holmes & Meier, 1974; third edition, Holmes & Meier, 1992
- "The Mass from Rossini to Dvořák c.1835–1900" in Choral Music, A. Jacobs (ed.), Pelican Press, 1963
- "The Church Music", in Anton Dvořák: His Achievement, Viktol Fischl (ed.), Greenwood (1970)
- "Music in the Mainland of Europe: 1918–1939" in New Oxford History of Music, Martin Cooper (ed.), Oxford University Press, 1974
- Letters of Giacomo Puccini (as editor), Harrap, 1974
- Alban Berg: the Man and his Work, Gerald Duckworth, 1975
- Major and Minor, Gerald Duckworth, 1980
- Hugo Wolf Songs, BBC Music Guides, 1982
- Giacomo Puccini: Tosca, Cambridge University Press, 1985

== Sources ==
- Brook, Donald, Conductors' Gallery: Biographical sketches of well-known orchestral conductors, Rockliff, 1947
- Kennedy, Michael and Bourne, Joyce (eds.), "Carner, Mosco", The Oxford Dictionary of Music, Oxford University Press, 1994, p. 153. ISBN 0-19-869162-9
- Mosse, Werner Eugen and Carlebach, Julius, Second Chance: Two Centuries of German-speaking Jews in the United Kingdom, Mohr Siebeck, 1991. ISBN 3-16-145741-2
- Carner, Mosco (7 August 1985). "Mosco Carner, Musicologist; Wrote Biography on Puccini". The New York Times.
- Sadie, Stanley (2001). "Carner [Cohen], Mosco". In Sadie, Stanley; Tyrrell, John (eds.). The New Grove Dictionary of Music and Musicians (2nd ed.). London: Macmillan. ISBN 978-1-56159-239-5.
- Who's Who in the World, 1978-1979, "Carner, Mosco", Marquis Who's Who, 1978, p. 160. ISBN 0-8379-1104-4
