= Fiona Maddocks =

British music critic and author

- Born: London, England, UK
- Education: Cambridge University; Royal College of Music
- Occupations: Music critic; author
- Notable credits: The Observer; BBC Music Magazine; Evening Standard

Fiona Maddocks is a British music critic and author who specializes in classical music. Described as "one of the UK's leading writers and commentators on classical music", Maddocks has been chief music critic of The Observer since 2010. She held a central role in founding three media companies: BBC Music Magazine, Channel 4 and The Independent.

Previously arts feature writer for the Evening Standard, Maddocks has also written for The Guardian and The Times. Her publications include a survey on the Medieval composer Hildegard of Bingen, a collection of interviews with Harrison Birtwistle, an anthology of 100 pieces recommended pieces, a guide to 20th-century classical music, and a study on Sergei Rachmaninoff's life outside of his native Russia.

== Life and career ==
Fiona Maddocks was born in London, studied English literature at Cambridge University and then attended the Royal College of Music. In 1997, she succeeded Andrew Porter as the chief music critic of The Observer. She stayed there until 2002, leaving due to the time commitments interfering with raising her children; she instead took a position as chief arts feature writer for the Evening Standard. Maddocks returned to The Observer in 2010, resuming her position as chief music critic, and has remained there since. Reflecting on what she enjoys about music criticism, Maddocks said "the music, the variety, the challenge, the privilege, the responsibility to those performing, the mental demands - it's a constant, amazing education and in its own way a sort of performance requiring adrenalin and concentration. You have to give your best, just as those on stage do." Maddocks continues work as a freelance writer, has also written for The Times and The Guardian. She has been described as "one of the UK's leading writers and commentators on classical music".

Throughout her career, Maddocks had a central role in the founding of three media organizations, a TV station, Newspaper and Magazine. The first of these was Channel 4, which she helped found in 1982. She was also the first music editor for The Independent, and founding editor for BBC Music Magazine, the world's largest classical music magazine.

Maddocks has written four books, the first of which was a survey on the 12th-century composer Hildegard of Bingen in 2001. Published by Headline in the UK and Doubleday in the US, it was described by the literary agent Felicity Bryan Associates as a "great critical success", and was later reissued by Faber and Faber; by 2019 it was on its 5th reprint. This was followed by a compilation of interviews with the composer Harrison Birtwistle, published in 2014 to coincide with his 80th birthday. In 2016, Maddocks published anthology of 100 pieces she recommends 'to carry you through life'. Her fourth book, Twentieth-Century Classical Music: A Ladybird Expert Book, was published in 2018.

She resides in both London and Oxford and has two daughters. Her second marriage was to the artist Tom Phillips, until his death in 2022. Also a violinist, Maddocks enjoys playing in chamber ensembles with friends. She was a jury member for the 2019 International Opera Award and is a trustee for the Pimlico Opera.

== Selected writings ==
=== Books ===
- Maddocks, Fiona (2001). Hildegard of Bingen: The Woman of Her Age. New York: Doubleday. ISBN 978-0-385-49867-8.
- ——; Birtwistle, Harrison (2014). Harrison Birtwistle: Wild Tracks - A Conversation Diary with Fiona Maddocks. London: Faber and Faber. ISBN 978-0-571-30811-8.
- —— (2016). Music For Life: 100 Works to Carry You Through. London: Faber and Faber. ISBN 978-0-571-32939-7.
- —— (2018). Twentieth-Century Classical Music: A Ladybird Expert Book. London: Penguin Books. ISBN 978-1-4059-3241-7.
- —— (2023). Goodbye Russia: Rachmaninoff in Exile. London: Faber and Faber. ISBN 978-0-571-37113-6.

=== Articles ===
- Maddocks, Fiona (19 August 2011). "Top 50 Operas". The Guardian.
- —— (9 July 2018). "An interview with Oliver Knussen". BBC Music Magazine.
- —— (20 February 2021). "No Simon Rattle, and no new concert hall for London ... but we will survive". The Guardian.
