= Dominic Cooper (author) =

British novelist, poet and watchmaker

Dominic Cooper (born 1944) is a British novelist, poet and watchmaker. He won the Somerset Maugham Award for his novel The Dead of Winter (1975).

== Background & career ==
Born near Winchester, he is the son of musicologist Martin Cooper and artist Mary Cooper. His sister Dame Imogen Cooper, DBE (born 1949) is an English pianist.

After university, he worked in London for the Decca Record Company and for the publishers, Fabbri & Partners. In 1970, he went to live in Iceland, began to concentrate on writing, and taught English in a language school in Reykjavík to earn a living.

In 1972, he moved to Sweden and then to the Isle of Mull in Argyll, Scotland, where he drew inspiration from the landscape and people to write his first novel, The Dead of Winter, published in 1975. This won him the Somerset Maugham Award in 1976.

Little of his poetry has been published, but commenting on the poetic quality of his fiction, he has said: ″By nature I feel myself to be first and foremost a poet ... but poetry for me has always been an essentially private affair and I have never felt any great need for it to be published.″

He has described writing his fourth book, The Horn Fellow, set in Northern Europe around 500 BC, as “perhaps the greatest experience of my life” and its publication as being met “with a mixture of incomprehension and vague ridicule”. He has written little during the intervening years.

In 1973 he undertook training in horology in Edinburgh and since then he has worked restoring clocks and watches. He returned to the West Highlands in 1985 and soon afterwards built himself a house on a remote part of the North Argyll coast where he now lives.

== Works ==
The Dead of Winter

Chatto & Windus 1975
St Martin’s Press, NY 1975
Faber & Faber 1985
Thirsty Press 2010
Italian edition, Einaudi 1989
Spanish edition, Mario Muchnik 2003
French edition, Métailié 2006
Somerset Maugham Award 1976

Sunrise

Chatto & Windus 1977
Faber & Faber 1985

Men at Axlir

Chatto & Windus 1978
St Martin’s Press, NY 1978
Collins Harvill 1988
Icelandic edition, Örn og Örlygur 1980

The Horn Fellow

Faber & Faber 1987

Jack Fletcher

Encounter 1978

Judgements of Value (editor)

OUP 1988

The Open Places (essay)

self-published 1989

also short stories, poems, essays and the script for Jack Fletcher, BBC TV 1979.
