= Frank Howes =

English music critic

Frank Stewart Howes (2 April 1891 – 28 September 1974) was an English music critic. From 1943 to 1960 he was chief music critic of The Times. From his student days Howes gravitated towards criticism as his musical specialism, guided by the advice of the conductor and professor Sir Hugh Allen and the critic H. C. Colles.

Howes was known for his affinity with English music in the tradition of the "English Musical Renaissance"; after 1945 he found the less nationalistic, more cosmopolitan nature of post-war composers uncongenial.

In addition to his work for The Times, Howes wrote fifteen books, and served on many musical committees for bodies including the BBC and the Arts Council.

== Life and career ==
Howes was born in Oxford, and was educated at Oxford High School and St John's College, where his love of music was developed under the tutelage of Sir Hugh Allen. After the First World War, in which he was conscripted into the Non-Combatant Corps, he was admitted to the Royal College of Music, where, guided by H. C. Colles, he specialised in musical criticism.

In 1925 Colles, who was chief music critic of The Times, recruited Howes to his staff. In 1938 Howes took on the additional duties of lecturer at the Royal College, and was later an extramural lecturer at Oxford and Glasgow Universities. When Colles died in 1943, Howes was appointed his successor.

Among Howes's enthusiasms was English folk music and, from 1927 to 1945, he edited the journal of the English Folk Dance and Song Society. He supported the theory that Hubert Parry and Charles Villiers Stanford led an "English Musical Renaissance" in the late 19th and early 20th centuries, from which composers not from a Royal College elite were excluded. His obituarist in The Times considered that of Howes's 15 books, it was the 1966 The English Musical Renaissance that meant most to him. According to his fellow critic Martin Cooper, Howes's affinity with music in the "English Renaissance" tradition left him out of sympathy with the increasingly cosmopolitan outlook of those British composers who emerged only after the Second World War.

Among Howes's other books were studies of William Byrd, Ralph Vaughan Williams and William Walton. In addition to his writing, he was active in behind-the-scenes musical work, as president of the Royal Musical Association (1947–58), chairman of the Musicians' Benevolent Fund (1936–55); and member of music advisory panels for the BBC, the Arts Council and the British Council.

Howes married Barbara Tidd Pratt in 1928; the couple had a son and three daughters. He lived with his family at Newbridge Mill in Standlake, Oxfordshire, and died at the Radcliffe Infirmary, Oxford, at the age of 83. He was cremated at Oxford crematorium on 2 October 1974, and his ashes were interred at St Lawrence, Combe, Oxfordshire.

== Books by Howes ==
- The Borderland of Music and Psychology (1926)
- Appreciation of Music (1928)
- William Byrd (1928)
- A Key to the Art of Music (1935)
- A Key to Opera (1939, with Philip Hope-Wallace)
- Full Orchestra (1942)
- Man, Mind and Music (1948)
- Musical Britain, 1951 (as compiler and editor, 1951)
- The Music of Ralph Vaughan Williams (1954)
- Music and its Meanings (1958)
- The Cheltenham Festival (1965)
- The Music of William Walton (1965)
- The English Musical Renaissance (1966)
- Folk Music of Britain – and Beyond (1969)
- Oxford Concerts: a Jubilee Record (1969)

Source: Grove Online.

Unpublished

- From Our Music Critic: an Autobiography (1972): manuscript, held by the British Library, MS Mus. 283
