= Philip Hope-Wallace =

English music and theatre critic (1911–1979)

Hope-Wallace in 1955

Philip Adrian Hope-Wallace CBE (6 November 1911 – 3 September 1979) was an English music and theatre critic, whose career was mostly with The Manchester Guardian (later known as The Guardian). From university he went into journalism after abortive attempts at other work, and apart from a stint at the Air Ministry throughout the Second World War, his career was wholly in arts journalism in newspapers, magazines and in broadcasting.

== Life and career ==
Hope-Wallace was born in London, the third and youngest child and only son of Charles Nugent Hope-Wallace, MBE, principal clerk of the Charity Commission for England and Wales, and his wife, Mabel Florence, daughter of Colonel Allan Chaplin, of the Madras Army. A great-grandson of Admiral Charles Ramsay Bethune, 24th Laird of Balfour, he was also descended from John Hope, 4th Earl of Hopetoun and George Nugent, 7th Earl of Westmeath. Philip attended Charterhouse School, after which, owing to a weak chest, he was sent to a sanatorium in Germany. He then moved to France, lodging with a Protestant clergyman in Normandy.

In 1930 Hope-Wallace went up to Balliol College, Oxford, to read modern languages. He graduated in 1933 during the Great Depression, and had difficulty in finding a job. He worked briefly for a commercial radio station at Fécamp, and from 1935 to 1936 was press officer for the Gas Light and Coke Company. While still in that post he obtained work on The Times as a special correspondent. At first he covered song recitals, and graduated to opera.

Unfit for military service, Hope-Wallace worked at the Air Ministry during the Second World War. After the war he returned to journalism, writing on music and theatre for The Daily Telegraph (1945–46) and then for The Manchester Guardian (from 1959 known as The Guardian), where he remained for the rest of his life. He also wrote for The Gramophone and Opera, and broadcast regularly for the BBC. He appeared as a castaway on the BBC Radio programme Desert Island Discs on 30 March 1974. The programme was not archived by the BBC, but an unofficial tape copy was among a collection of over 90 episodes discovered by an amateur researcher and placed online in 2022. In 1975 he was appointed CBE for his services to the arts.

Hope-Wallace was unmarried. He died in London at the age of 67. The obituarist in The Times called him "a critic of the arts as wise and searching as anyone in his time … all his work was fuelled by an informed pleasure that his attractively languid personality never concealed … above all he was consistently readable."

== Publications ==
A selection of his writings for the publications noted above, as well as several other British periodicals including the New Statesman, Opera (London), Punch, The Spectator, and Vogue appear in a volume edited by C.V. Wedgwood (whose partner was Hope-Wallace's sister Jacqueline Hope-Wallace) under the title Words and Music.
