= Martin Cooper (musicologist) =

English musicologist

- Born: 17 January 1910; Winchester, England
- Died: 15 March 1986 (aged 76); Richmond upon Thames, England
- Occupations: Chief music critic The Daily Telegraph, editor The Musical Times
- Known for: French Music (book)

Martin du Pré Cooper CBE (17 January 1910 – 15 March 1986) was an English musicologist, critic and author.

Cooper was born in Winchester and studied at Hertford College, Oxford, before a period of study in Vienna with Egon Wellesz. Fluent in half-a-dozen languages, he taught modern languages at Stowe College and Winchester College while simultaneously establishing himself as a music critic, first at the London Mercury (1935–9), then (interrupted by the war) the Daily Herald (1946–50) and The Spectator (1947–54). In 1950 he joined The Daily Telegraph as assistant to Richard Capell, succeeding him as chief music critic four years later when Capell died. He remained at the Telegraph until his retirement in 1976 and was succeeded by Peter Stadlen. He was also editor of The Musical Times between 1953 and 1956.

Cooper is best known for his book French Music, first published in 1951. He was a lifelong enthusiast of Gluck and a champion of the often vilified Meyerbeer, Gounod and Massenet. He was less forgiving of what he saw as the romantic excesses of Mahler, Richard Strauss and Elgar. But his interests were wide-ranging, encompassing German and Russian music, as well as a broader, cosmopolitan perspective on philosophy, literature and cultural and political history than most of his English contemporaries.

He married the artist Mary Stewart in 1940. There were four children, including the novelist Dominic Cooper and the pianist Imogen Cooper. Cooper was appointed CBE in 1972. In retirement he turned increasingly to translation, including the collected essays of Pierre Boulez and a new translation of Tchaikovsky's The Queen of Spades. He died in Richmond upon Thames.

== Books ==
- Gluck (1935)
- Georges Bizet (1938)
- Opéra comique (1949)
- Profils de musiciens anglais (1950)
- French Music from the Death of Berlioz to the Death of Fauré (1951)
- Russian Opera (1951)
- Ideas and Music (1966)
- Beethoven: the Last Decade, 1817–1827 (1970, revised 1985)
- ed.: The New Oxford History, Vol 10: The Modern Age, 1890–1960 (1974)
- (as translator): Orientations: Collected Writings of Pierre Boulez (1986)
- Judgements of Value (1988) (selected writings, ed. Dominic Cooper)
