= Andrew Porter (music critic) =

British musician (1928–2015)

- Born: 26 August 1928; Cape Town, South Africa
- Died: 3 April 2015 (aged 86); London, United Kingdom
- Occupation: Music critic

Andrew Brian Porter (26 August 1928 – 3 April 2015) was a British music critic, opera librettist, opera director, scholar, and organist.

== Early life and education ==
Andrew Porter was born in Cape Town, South Africa on 26 August 1928. His father was a dentist. His mother was originally from England and had contemplated a career as a singer before settling into married life. Andrew attended Diocesan College in Rondebosch where his studies included music. While a student there he served as an accompanist for symphony conductor Albert Coates in his rehearsals, and also played basso continuo in performances of Bach’s Mass in B minor under Coates's direction. From 1947 to 1950 he studied at the University College, Oxford where his primary focus was english literature. He also studied the organ at that university.

== Early career in England ==
Porter began his career as a music critic for the Manchester Guardian in 1949, and later became a music critic for The Times in 1951. He also wrote for Daily Telegraph and Daily Express in his early career. In London he was mentored in music criticism by Desmond Shawe-Taylor of The New Statesman for whom he would occasionally deputize. He also worked with Alec Robertson who invited him to participate in radio broadcasts on BBC Third Programme.

In 1952 Porter was appointed music critic at The Financial Times. He served as that paper's lead critic for twenty years; with Ronald Crichton succeeding him in 1972. Stanley Sadie, in the 2001 edition of the Grove Dictionary of Music and Musicians, wrote that Porter "built up a distinctive tradition of criticism, with longer notices than were customary in British daily papers, based on his elegant, spacious literary style and always informed by a knowledge of music history and the findings of textual scholarship as well as an exceptionally wide range of sympathies with 19th-century opera and its interpretation as their focal point."

While working at The Financial Times, Porter spent his vacations traveling abroad attending opera performances in Germany, France, Austria and Italy; a routine he maintained for the rest of his life. He was associate editor of Opera magazine from 1953 to 1956 and was thereafter a recurring writer and member of its editorial board for many years. From 1960 to 1967 he served as the editor of The Musical Times. During his tenure there he greatly expanded the publication's coverage of new music and opera, and modernized the practices of the journal. He also worked as a regular contributor to Gramophone, and began contributing articles to The New York Times as a foreign correspondent in the 1950s.

== Career in the United States ==
From 1972 to 1973 Porter served a term as the music critic of The New Yorker; returning to England for a year fellowship in 1973-1974 at All Souls College, Oxford. After this he resumed work at The New Yorker; remain at that magazine until 1992. His writings for The New Yorker won respect from leading figures in the musical world. The composer and critic Virgil Thomson, in a 1974 commentary on the state of music criticism, stated, "Nobody reviewing in America has anything like Porter's command of [opera]. Nor has The New Yorker ever before had access through music to so distinguished a mind." In particular, with operas that were unfamiliar to him, Porter exercised additional diligence in his preparation for his reviews. According to Opera News:

When reviewing an opera that was new to him, such as Bloch's Macbeth, he might attend three performances before he felt qualified to write about it; he frequently returned to productions after opening night to refine his viewpoint, and he reviewed virtually all music only after learning it from the score."

While living in New York, Porter taught courses part time at the City University of New York and served as the editor of the newsletter of the American Institute for Verdi Studies at New York University (founded 1976). He also served as the named chair "Ernest Bloch professor" at the University of California, Berkeley in 1980-1981, and was a member of the editorial board of the journal 19th-Century Music.

== Opera translator, librettist, and scholar ==
Porter translated the libretti of 37 operas, of which his English translations of Der Ring des Nibelungen and The Magic Flute have been widely performed. He also directed several operas for either fully staged or semi-staged performance. He authored the librettos for John Eaton's The Tempest, after Shakespeare, and Bright Sheng's The Song of Majnun, based on the ancient Persian story.

As a scholar, Porter notably discovered excised portions of Verdi's Don Carlos in the library of the Paris Opera, which led to the restoration of the original version of the work. Porter was a consultant for a 1996 production at the Théâtre du Châtelet that used portions of the music which he had found.

== Later life in England ==
In 1992 Porter returned to England when he was appointed music critic at The Observer. He remained in that position until 1997 when he left to become music critic at The Times Literary Supplement.

In 2003, Porter was honored with the publication of a festschrift, Words on Music: Essays in Honor of Andrew Porter on the Occasion of His 75th Birthday.

Porter died of pneumonia on 3 April 2015. His twin sister was his only surviving relation. He continued attending performances, including one of Die Meistersinger, even while sick, and his final two reviews for Opera, of Gaetano Donizetti's Il furioso all'isola di San Domingo and I pazzi per progetto, went to press hours before his death.

== Bibliography ==
=== Books ===
- A Musical Season: A Critic from Abroad in America, Viking Press (1974), ISBN 0-670-49650-2
- The Ring of the Nibelung (translation), Norton (1976) ISBN 0-393-02192-0
- Music of Three Seasons, 1974–1977, Farrar, Straus and Giroux (1978), ISBN 0-374-21646-0
- Music of Three More Seasons, 1977–1980, Knopf (1981), ISBN 0-394-51813-6
- Verdi's Macbeth: A Sourcebook (with David Rosen), Cambridge University Press (1984), ISBN 0-521-26520-7
- Musical Events: A Chronicle, 1980–1983, Summit Books (1987), ISBN 0-671-63538-7
- Musical Events: A Chronicle, 1983–1986, Summit Books (1989), ISBN 0-671-63539-5

| Preceded by Winthrop Sargeant | Music Critic of The New Yorker; 1972–1973, 1974–1992 | Succeeded by Paul Griffiths |
