= Ralph Hill (music critic) =

English music critic

Ralph Hill (8 October 1900 – 19 October 1950) was an English writer on music. Hill was born in Watford into a musical family: one of his grandfathers was Joseph Williams the music publisher; the other was Thomas Henry Weist Hill, violinist, conductor and the first director of the Guildhall School of Music. After attending Latymer Upper School Hill was taught cello by his father at Guildhall. By 1920, following military service for two years, he was active in music publishing, influenced by the example of Ernest Newman.

His first full-time appointment was as editor of the Musical Mirror and Fanfare from 1929 to 1932. The following year he became music editor of the Radio Times, a post he held until 1945. He was also assistant music critic with the Daily Mail from 1933, and was later (1945–48) appointed chief music critic on the paper, succeeding Edwin Evans. Hill was editor of The Liverpool Daily Post and (for two years) The Sunday Express, and from the 1940s a regular BBC broadcaster on classical music. In 1946 he was appointed editor of The Penguin Music Magazine (nine issues, 1946-1949) and the Pelican annual book series Music (1950 and 1951).

Hill was married to Ida Joan Bryce. In the 1930s they were living at 22 Sutherland Grove, Southfields. They later moved to 39 Hazlewell Rd in Putney, where Hill founded the Putney Gramophone Society in the autumn of 1949. He was also a wrestling enthusiast, and arranged several friendly matches with the pianist Benno Moiseiwitsch, who was also a skilled wrestler. Hill died at his home on October 19, 1950, having been taken ill after attending the Royal Philharmonic Society concert at the Albert Hall the previous evening.

== Publications ==
- An Outline of Musical History (1929)
- Brahms: A Study in Musical Biography (1933)
- Liszt ('Great Lives' series) (1936; 2nd ed., 1949)
- Brahms ('Great Lives' series) (1941)
- Challenges: A Series of Controversial Essays on Music (1943)
- 'Some Reflections on Music Criticism' in Musical Quarterly, April 1943, pp. 188–197
- Music without Fears (1945)
- The Symphony (ed.) (1949)
- Music 1950
- Music 1951
- Prelude to Music (1951)
- The Concerto (ed.) (1952)
