= Martin Bernheimer =

American music critic (1936–2019)

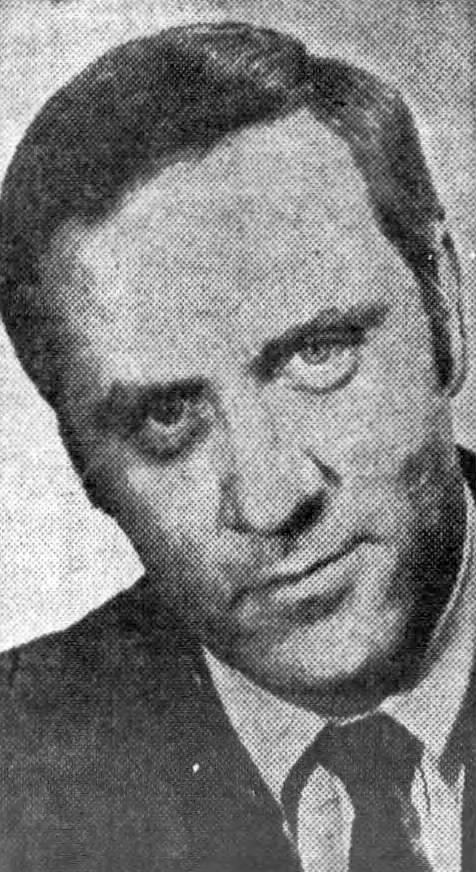
- Bernheimer in 1969
- Born: September 28, 1936; Munich, Germany
- Died: September 29, 2019 (aged 83); New York City, US
- Education: Brown University (BA); University of Music and Theatre Munich; New York University (MA)
- Occupation: Music critic
- Employers: New York Post; Los Angeles Times

Martin Bernheimer (September 28, 1936 – September 29, 2019) was a German and American classical music critic. Described as "a widely respected and influential critic, who [was] particularly knowledgeable about opera and the voice", Bernheimer was the chief classical music critic of the Los Angeles Times from 1965 to 1996.

== Early life and education ==
Martin Bernheimer was born in Munich, Germany on September 28, 1936, to Paul and Louise Bernheimer (née Nassauer). His father was a partner of the antiques business Haus Bernheimer, while his mother was an artist; both parents were Jewish. In November 1938, amid the Nazi's Kristallnacht—which targeted Jewish homes, businesses, synagogues and other buildings—Paul's business was destroyed. Upon reading Mein Kampf in 1933, Louise had urged the family to flee, but Paul demurred, commenting that "Oh, no, this is our Germany, the country of great philosophers and artists". Martin's sister later remarked that "I am sure Martin did not have any memory of Kristallnacht, when the Nazis came knocking in the middle of the night to arrest our father, kicking my brothers around while looting the apartment". Paul and his brothers were sent to the Dachau concentration camp, though an uncle successfully traded their freedom by giving the Nazis the family's estate in Venezuela.

In 1939, Martin, Paul, and Louise were able to move to Norton, Massachusetts. Martin became a US citizen in 1946. He studied at Brown University, graduating in 1958, and the Hochschule für Musik in Munich, as well as musicology with Gustave Reese at New York University, where he received a master's degree in 1961.

== Career and later life ==
His career writing about music began in New York, writing for the New York Herald Tribune, working as an assistant to Irving Kolodin at the Saturday Review, and landing the position of music critic at the New York Post. In 1965 he moved to Los Angeles where he worked as the chief music and dance critic for the Los Angeles Times. During his thirty years with that paper, he was twice the recipient of ASCAP's Deems Taylor Award (1974 and 1978) and in 1982 won the Pulitzer Prize for Criticism.

In 1966, Bernheimer became a faculty member of the Rockefeller program for the training of music critics at University of Southern California. In 1969, he joined the music faculty of UCLA. Bernheimer was a regular lecturer and also taught criticism at Cal State University, Northridge, San Diego State University and California Institute of the Arts. In 1982 he became an honorary member of a chapter of Pi Kappa Lambda, the national music honor society.

From 1996 until his semi-retirement in 2017 due to ill health, Bernheimer's work appeared mainly in Opera and the Financial Times. Bernheimer lectured frequently and provided commentary for opera broadcasts.

He died in New York on September 29, 2019.
