= Opera (British magazine) =

UK monthly publication about opera

- Cover of the March 2024 issue
- Editor: John Allison
- Frequency: Monthly
- Founded: 1950
- Company: Opera Magazine Limited
- Country: United Kingdom
- Based in: London
- Website: www.opera.co.uk
- ISSN: 0030-3526

Opera is a monthly British magazine devoted to covering all things related to opera. It contains reviews and articles about current opera productions internationally, as well as articles on opera recordings, opera singers, opera companies, opera directors, and opera books. The magazine also contains major features and analysis on individual operas and people associated with opera.

The magazine employs a network of international correspondents around the world who write for the magazine. Contributors to the magazine, past and present, include William Ashbrook, Martin Bernheimer, Julian Budden, Rodolfo Celletti, Alan Blyth, Elizabeth Forbes, and J.B. Steane among many others.

== Format ==
Opera is printed in A5 size, with colour photos, and consists of around 130 pages. Page numbering is consecutive for a complete year (e.g. September 2009 covers pages 1033–1168). All issues since February 1950 are available online to current subscribers (through Exact Editions).

== History ==
Based in London, the magazine was founded in 1950 by George Lascelles, 7th Earl of Harewood. It was launched at the house of Richard Buckle, under the imprint 'Ballet Publications Ltd'. It seems the previous Ballet and Opera magazine, edited by Richard Buckle, split into two separate magazines - one Opera and the other Ballet.

After Lascelles, Harold Rosenthal served as editor from 1953 to 1986, Rodney Milnes from 1986 and John Allison has held that position since 2000, with Milnes as chair of the editorial board until his death in 2015.

In 1965 Victor Gollancz Limited published a wide-ranging collection of articles which had appeared in the magazine during the first 15 years, with alongside those by regular Opera contributors, articles by Benjamin Britten, Sylvia Fisher, Magda Olivero, Helga Pilarczyk, Dennis Arundell, Osbert Lancaster, Joan Cross, Gottfried Schmiedel and Erwin Stein.

An occasional series of supplements have been published: Thirty all-time great recordings (August 2002), Great Opera Houses of the World (July 2003), In character: Great singers in great roles 1 (August 2004) and 2 (September 2006), Great First Nights (September 2005), Opera stage on screen (September 2007); along with four volumes of reprints of profiles of singers (grouped by voice type, 2002–2004) and directors (January 2006 and January 2007).

A separate annual 'Festivals' issue was published until 2012, with listings of opera or operetta festivals (or music festivals including operas) in the UK and all around the world for the coming season, preceded by longer articles on particular festival projects or personalities. From 2013, the separate issue was dropped in favour of a festivals focus in the April edition, due to the ready availability of listings on-line.

In recent years, the last page has been a lighter feature, such as 'I can't live without... golf' by Barbara Bonney (August 1999), 'My First Opera – Don Giovanni' by Osmo Vänskä (February 2004), and Roger Parker on why he would like to come back as Pasha Selim (December 2007).

== Editorial Team and Board ==
The current editor is John Allison, with Erica Jeal and Henrietta Bredin as deputy editors. The editorial board consists of Hugh Canning, Rupert Christiansen, Andrew Clark, Andrew Clements, Richard Fairman, George Hall, Fiona Maddocks, and Roger Parker.
