= Richard Capell =

Richard Capell OBE MM
- Born: 23 March 1885; Northampton, England
- Died: 21 June 1954 (aged 69); London, England
- Education: Bedford Modern School
- Known for: Music critic and journalist

Richard Capell OBE MM (23 March 1885 – 21 June 1954) was a British journalist who was music critic for the Daily Mail (1911–1933) and thereafter at The Daily Telegraph.

== Biography ==
Capell was born in Northampton and educated at Bedford Modern School. He then studied the cello in London and Lille, before becoming a journalist. He served in France during the First World War and was awarded a Military Medal for gallantry at the Battle of Vimy Ridge. From 1928 to 1933 he worked on the Monthly Musical Record, where, according to Grove's Dictionary of Music and Musicians, his abilities as an editor were evident. He became chief music critic of The Daily Telegraph from 1933 until his death in 1954.

In 1937 he took on the proprietorship of the journal Music and Letters, and he was its editor from 1950 until his death. During the Second World War he served as a war correspondent in France, the western Sahara and Greece for the Daily Telegraph. He was awarded the OBE in 1946. In 1944 Capell went to Greece with Brig Turnbull and the Aegean Raiding Force on a trip to Khios and Athens. He was in Athens when Winston Churchill arrived on Christmas Day 1944 to hold talks with ELAS and other Greek patriots. His book Simiomata (Greek jottings) about his experiences and his understanding of the Dekemvriana is an important contemporary account of these tumultuous days and somewhat contradicts the views expressed by Geoffrey Hoare, The Times correspondent (also published in The Manchester Guardian). Simiomata was referenced by Louis de Bernières in his novel Captain Corelli's Mandolin.

Grove comments that Capell "was chiefly drawn to Schubert", and that his study, Schubert's Songs (London, 1928, revised 1973 by Martin Cooper), "established itself as an important book on the composer." His other books included Opera (1930, 2nd edition 1948). Several extracts from his notes for a study of Gustav Holst were published as articles in Music and Letters and The Monthly Musical Record.

Capell made English translations of many songs by Schubert, Schumann, Grieg and Wolf. He also translated Joseph Gregor's libretto for Richard Strauss's opera Friedenstag.

He died in London in 1954 while at his London club, aged 69.
