= William James Henderson =

American novelist

William James Henderson circa 1910

William James Henderson (December 4, 1855 – June 5, 1937) was an American musical critic and scholar.

== Biography ==
He was born on December 4, 1855, in Newark, New Jersey.

He graduated from Princeton in 1876 and immediately began work as a journalist, later as a reporter, then as the musical critic of The New York Times, and in 1902 of The New York Sun. He wrote perceptive press reviews of the performances of the Metropolitan Opera's star singers which remain valuable for today's scholars. Henderson's perspicacity as a musical reviewer and evaluator was recognised when he was appointed lecturer on musical history in the New York College of Music. He was also elected a member of the National Institute of Arts and Letters in 1914.

Three days after the death of his longtime friend and fellow newspaper music critic, Richard Aldrich, he committed suicide with a .38-calibre revolver in his West-Side Manhattan hotel room. His New York Times obituary called him "for fifty years one of America's best known music critics."

== Publications ==
- Preludes and Studies (1891)
- Sea Yarns for Boys (1894)
- Afloat with the Flag (1895)
- The Last Cruise of the Mohawk (1897)
- The Story of Music (1889; 12 enlarged ed., 1912)
- Elements of Navigation (1895)
- How Music Developed (1898)
- What is Good Music? (1898)
- Richard Wagner, His Life and His Dramas (1901)
- The Orchestra and Orchestral Music (1902)
- Modern musical Drift (1904)
- The Art of the singer (1906)
- Some Forerunners of Italian Opera (1911)
- The Soul of a Tenor (1912) a novel
- Early History of Singing (1921)
