= Fire Shut Up in My Bones =

Opera by Terence Blanchard

- Opera by Terence Blanchard
- Librettist: Kasi Lemmons
- Language: English
- Based on: Charles M. Blow's memoir Fire Shut Up in My Bones
- Premiere: June 15, 2019; Opera Theatre of Saint Louis

Fire Shut Up in My Bones is an English-language opera in three acts, with music by Terence Blanchard and libretto by Kasi Lemmons.

The opera was first performed at the Opera Theatre of Saint Louis in 2019, and is based on the 2014 memoir of the same name by Charles M. Blow. It opened the Metropolitan Opera season in 2021 following the COVID-19 pandemic, and was the first opera by a black composer ever performed there in the Met's 138-year history. Fire returned to the Metropolitan Opera in 2024.

The narrative focus of the opera is on Charles, a young African-American man growing up in poverty. As he comes of age, he must decide how to deal with the sexual abuse he previously suffered at the hands of his cousin. At the climax, he decides not to take revenge. The opera includes flashbacks and the appearance of the protagonist's internal voices in the form of female spirits.

The 2019 premiere opened to mixed reviews, and in subsequent years critics have tended to focus on the historical importance of the 2021 Metropolitan Opera production. Blanchard's music has divided critics, both in terms of the quality of the score and his influences.

== Background ==
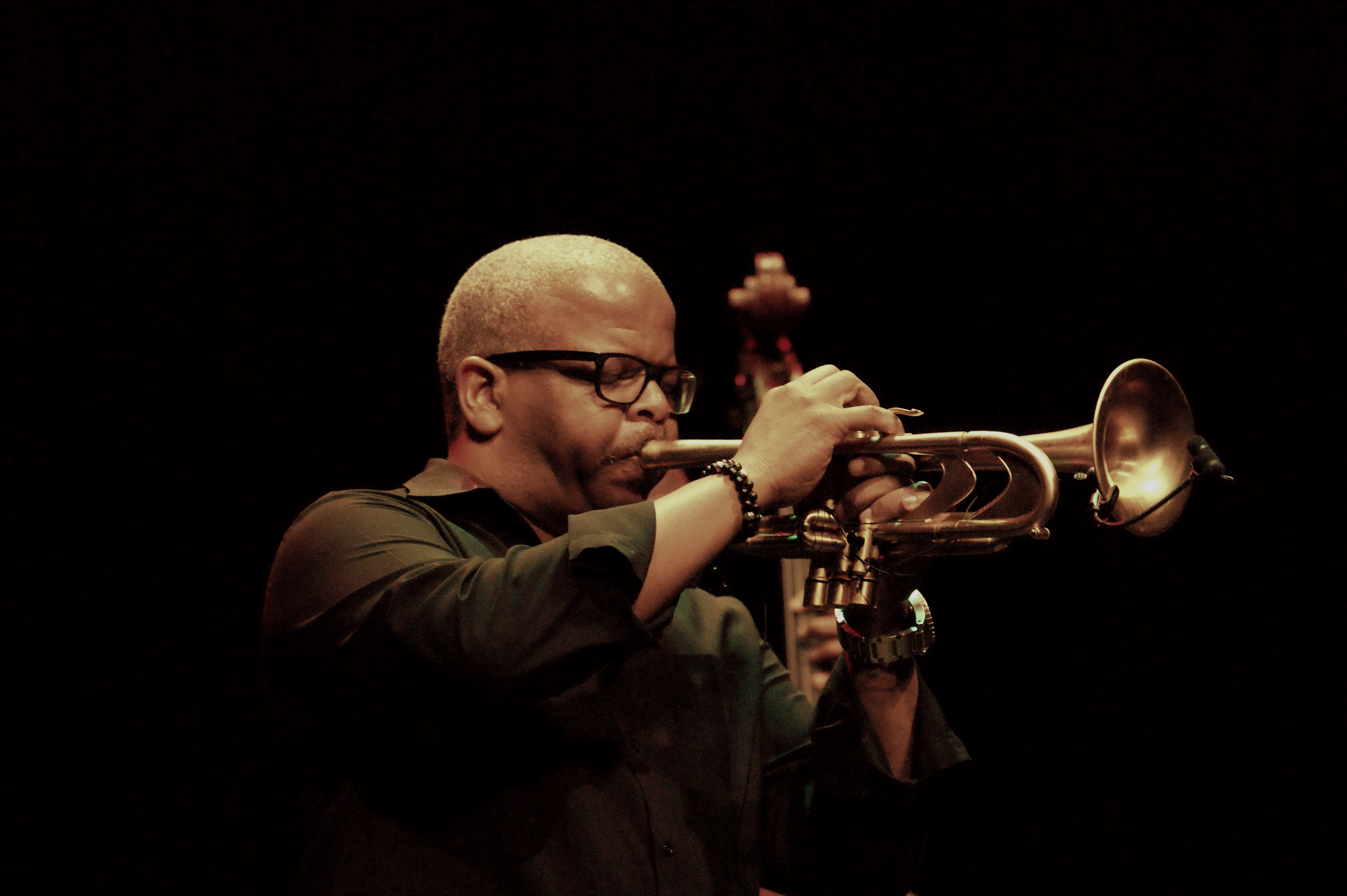
Composer Terence Blanchard performing in Rotterdam in 2014

Blanchard described Fire Shut Up in My Bones as "opera in jazz". It is the composer's second opera, following Champion in 2013. Aside from opera, Blanchard has won five Grammy Awards for his jazz records. He is also a noted film composer and has been nominated twice for Academy Award for Best Original Score for films BlacKkKlansman and Da 5 Bloods, both directed by Spike Lee. The title of the opera, which is also the title of Blow's memoir, is a biblical reference, specifically quoting Jeremiah 20:9.

Whilst the opera's libretto and narrative reflect the content and themes of Blow's memoir, it is not a comprehensive retelling of the book. The essential elements are reflective of Blow's life. As noted by Patricia J. Williams in a review of the book: "He grows up amid mean if not absolute poverty; he is molested both by a cousin and by an uncle; his father is distant, an alcoholic; and his parents separate under circumstances that involve his mother waving a gun about on more than one occasion".

== Performance history ==
The opera made its world premiere on June 15, 2019, at the Opera Theatre of Saint Louis. The conductor of the premiere performance was William Long. Performers included Julia Bullock and Davóne Tines.

The Metropolitan Opera's 2021–2022 season opened with Fire Shut Up in My Bones on September 27, 2021. It was the first opera by an African-American composer to be performed at the Metropolitan Opera since its founding in 1883. The conductor was Yannick Nézet-Séguin. The co-director and choreographer was Camille A. Brown. Fire Shut Up in My Bones had not been intended as a season opener at the Metropolitan Opera, but general manager Peter Gelb stated that the Black Lives Matter movement had informed his decision to move the piece to such a prominent slot. It was recorded as part of the Metropolitan Opera Live in HD film series and the recording won a Grammy for Best Opera Recording in 2023.

The Lyric Opera of Chicago presented the opera in March/April 2022. These performances were conducted by Daniela Candillari.

Fire Shut Up in My Bones returned to the Metropolitan Opera in 2024, with the bass-baritone Ryan Speedo Green as Charles, with Evan Rogister conducting.

== Roles ==
Roles, voice types, and premiere cast
Role	Voice type	Premiere cast, June 15, 2019 Conductor: William Long
Charles (adult)	bass-baritone	Davóne Tines
Char’es-Baby (Charles, as a boy)	treble voice	Jeremy Denis
Chester, Charles' cousin	baritone	Markel Reed
Destiny/Loneliness, apparition	soprano	Julia Bullock
Billie, Charles' mother	soprano	Karen Slack
Spinner, Billie's husband	tenor	Chaz’men Williams-Ali
Greta	soprano	Julia Bullock

== Synopsis ==
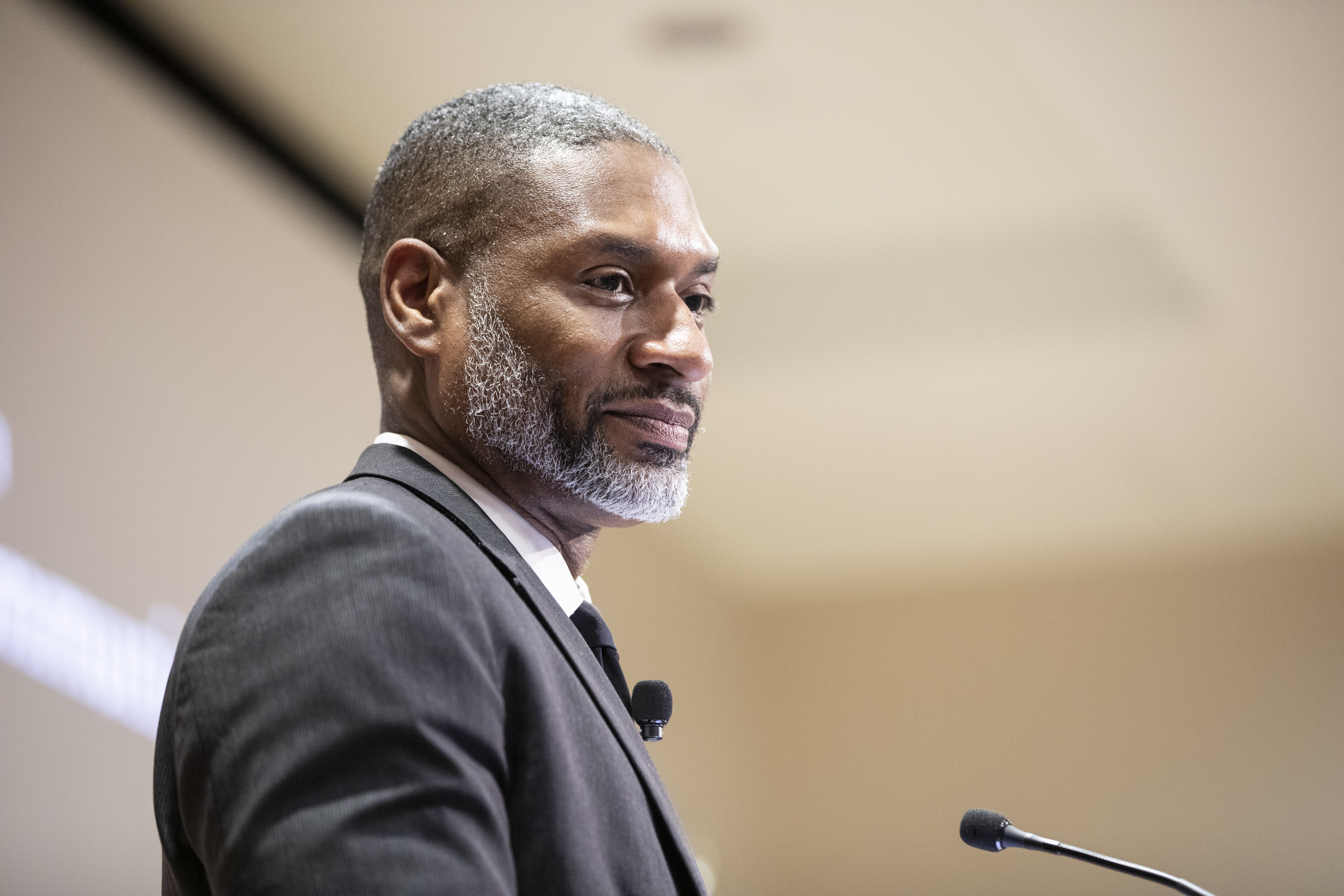
The story is based on the memoir of journalist Charles M. Blow (pictured)

=== Act 1 ===
As the opera opens, Charles Blow, age 20, is driving towards his childhood home in Louisiana. The voice of Destiny sings to him and he relives childhood memories.

In the flashback, Charles is seven years old, known as Char’es-Baby. His mother Billie works in a chicken factory to support her five sons, and they live in poverty. Billie dreams of Char’es-Baby getting a good education and leaving town. Billie's husband, Spinner, is generally absent, and a womanizing wastrel. Discovering his latest misdeeds, Billie kicks Spinner out at gunpoint. The family move in with Uncle Paul. Char’es-Baby spends time collecting "treasure" from the junkyard while Loneliness sings to him. When his cousin Chester comes to visit Char'es-Baby is initially pleased, but when Billie innocently puts them in a room together, Chester sexually abuses him. He is too devastated and shocked to tell his mother, or anyone else.

At the end of Act 1 the adult Charles cries whilst reflecting on these memories, and the voice of Destiny reminds him he cannot escape from them.

=== Act 2 ===
Charles is now a teenager and is dealing with the lasting impact of the abuse. Attending a church revival, he is baptised by a pastor who promises that God can wipe all sins clean. The baptism does not seem to ease Charles' mind. Charles tries to open up to his brothers, but they reject his attempts at “soft talk.” The personification of Loneliness reappears and promises to accompany Charles. This encounter is interrupted by Evelyn, a beautiful girl with whom Charles has an obvious chemistry. Charles is uplifted and is ready to be independent; Grambling State University has offered him a full scholarship. His mother Billie is left alone to reflect on all that she has sacrificed for her family and ponders the uncertain future.

=== Act 3 ===
Charles is hazed upon joining a fraternity at his college. Being used to pain, he receives the hazing stoically. Later, he goes to a nightclub and meets an attractive young woman, Greta, with whom he begins an affair. As they grow close, Charles tells Greta of the abuse he suffered as a child. Greta, however, informs him that she is seeing someone else, and Charles is alone once again. He calls home, wanting the comfort of his mother's voice. To his shock and anger; his mother tells him that his cousin Chester is visiting. Charles decides to go home. He brings a gun with him and seems intent on confronting Chester.

As Charles sits in his car in the dark, the siren voice of Destiny sings to him again, encouraging him to take his revenge. As Charles reaches his childhood home, Char’es-Baby appears, urging him to let go of his anger. Charles ultimately decides not to take revenge on his cousin, as words from Act One are again invoked: "“Sometimes you just gotta leave it in the road”.

== Reception ==
=== Music ===
Regarding the composition, critics were divided on Blanchard's influences and on the effectiveness of the score. Giovanni Russonello and Seth Colter Walls of the New York Times wrote that the music is generally based on Italian opera, but Blanchard's jazz influence is also audible. Chris Jones of the Chicago Tribune disagreed with other critics who emphasize Blanchard's jazz influence, saying 'Rather, under the baton of Daniela Candillari, you hear Blanchard's driving confidence in operatic mode, both harmonic and dissident, both aware of European formative precedent and sharply critical in subtle ways." Writing in a review of the 2024 revival, Kevin Ng felt "Blanchard’s score deftly integrates jazz and gospel into an operatic framework".

Lawrence A. Johnson expressed negative opinions of the score and libretto in his review of the 2022 Chicago production, saying that the "almost unrelievedly bland" score is "cast in a kind of noodling jazz-piano lounge style".

=== 2019 Opera Theatre Saint Louis ===
Reviewing the premiere for the New York Times, Anthony Tommasini described the music variety of Blanchard's score: "Restless vocal lines shift from plaintive lyrical phrases, to sputtered outbursts, to a style that seems a jazz equivalent of Italianate arioso". Though noting that the opera tends to "melodramatic excess", Tommaisini praised the "brilliantly simple, evocative production", and singled out Julia Bullock and Davóne Tines in leading roles as "ravishing" and "terrifyingly volatile" respectively.

Writing for Dallas Morning News, Scott Cantrell gave a mixed review, saying "...on first exposure, I'm not sure Fire comes together as a convincing whole".

For the Chicago Classical Review, John van Rhein wrote that the premiere was "a major cultural event for St Louis", and felt that it "received a worthy production" by the artistic director James Robinson. Van Rhein was less minded to praise the opera as a drama, writing "for all their good intentions the composer and librettist miss the beating heart of the book".

=== 2021 Metropolitan Opera ===
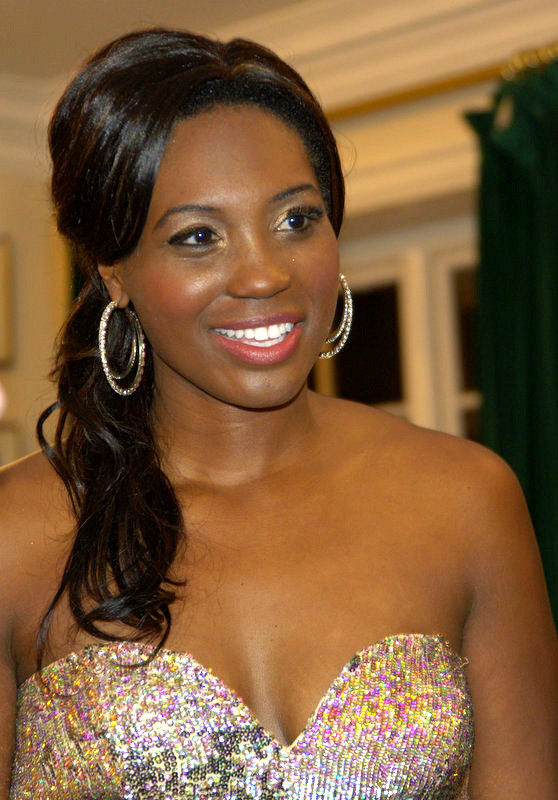
Angel Blue received praise for her role in the 2021 Met Opera production

In reviews of the 2021 Metropolitan Opera production, critics praised the interpretation of the lead role as the adult Charles by baritone Will Liverman, who critics described as "subtle", "nuanced" and "powerful". There were, however, concerns that he was at times overwhelmed by the orchestra.

In a review for Parterre Box Gabrielle Ferrari wrote "Blanchard's score is richly colored and beautifully orchestrated". With regard to the storytelling and characterization, she went on to say the score was written "mainly with a clear-eyed compassion for his characters, to whom he never condescends nor condemns".

Writing for Vulture, critic Justin Davidson opined in an otherwise positive review that "in their enthusiasm, composer and conductor sometimes seem to have forgotten about the singers, who struggle to be heard over all the engaging churn". Davidson also stated that Fire Shut Up in My Bones was a conventional opera which did not "blow up the genre".

In his review James Jorden called Fire "an opera with legs" and predicted many future revivals. He further stated that "At its current length of two and a half hours, Fire Shut Up in My Bones is in the running for best American opera of the 21st century. Trimmed of perhaps 20 minutes... I think it would be a clear winner."

Alex Ross of The New Yorker praised Angel Blue for her performance of the two "inner voice" roles as well as the role of Greta, describing her as "soaring above the orchestra".

Walter Russell III, as the younger Charles, received acclaim from the audience and critics. He was 13 years old at the time of the production.

=== 2022 Lyric Opera of Chicago ===
Chris Jones of the Chicago Tribune praised Liverman, who retained the lead role of Charles, describing his performance as having an "aching vulnerability". In his review, Jones emphasized the "historical weight" of the opera, and called it "a voyage of considerable complexity".

=== 2024 Metropolitan Opera ===
Zachary Woolfe, writing for the New York Times, gave a mixed review for the return of Fire to the Met. He emphasised the historic nature of the first production, which he felt had given it a sense of occasion that could not be matched by the revival. Woolfe praised Ryan Speedo Green in the recast lead role of Charles, calling his tone "focused and secure". However, he felt that the opera's shortcomings were clearer in the second production, saying that the first production had an "exhilarating sense of occasion" which was absent in its second run. Woolfe wrote that the highlight of the performance was the choreography by Camille A. Brown, concluding "it says something about an opera when its most memorable moments are dance.".

Writing for the Financial Times, Kevin Ng was more positive in a four-star review, saying that Fire "seems to hold its own in its latest revival". Ng felt Ryan Speedo Green succeeded as Charles (having played a minor role in the previous Met Opera production of Fire) saying his "voice of Wagnerian proportions" effectively conveyed both rage and vulnerability, and Ng wrote also praised Latonia Moore as Charles's mother, writing that her "voluptuous, richly coloured soprano" brought depth to her character. The fraternity step dance in Act III was described as a standout moment, eliciting an "enthusiasm rarely heard in the Met's auditorium." Ng credited conductor Evan Rogister with bringing "clarity and fluidity" to Blanchard's "heavy orchestration".

== 2023 Grammy Award ==
The audio recording of the stage production won a 2023 Grammy for Best Opera Recording with The Metropolitan Opera Orchestra and The Metropolitan Opera Chorus, along with Nézet-Séguin, producer David Frost, baritone Will Liverman, sopranos Latonia Moore and Blue and treble Walter Russell III, making him one of the youngest recipients of the awards at the time.

== Video recording ==
- 2021 (HD video): Will Liverman as Charles; Angel Blue as Destiny/Loneliness/Greta; Latonia Moore as Billie; Ryan Speedo Green as Uncle Paul; Chauncey Packer as Spinner; Walter Russell III as Char'es-Baby; Metropolitan Opera Orchestra and Chorus, conducted by Yannick Nézet-Séguin; James Robinson (co-director); Camille A. Brown (co-director and choreographer); Allen Moyer (set designer); Paul Tazewell (costume designer); Christopher Akerlind (lighting designer); Greg Emetaz (projection designer); Gary Halvorson (video director); Audra McDonald (host); recorded live at the Metropolitan Opera House on October 23, 2021; available for streaming at Met Opera on Demand
