= Classical music blog =

Form of Music Blog

Screenshot of The Rest is Noise, a classical music blog by Alex Ross

A classical music blog uses the blogging format to cover classical music issues from a wide range of perspectives, including music lovers, individual performers and ensembles, composers, arts organizations and music critics.

== Overview ==
As blogging has become increasingly popular, the blogrolls for classical music (like those for other genres) have grown increasingly long. "And yes, they are read," wrote music critic Anne Midgette in The New York Times. She reported that an anonymous blogger had posted her wedding picture on their blog, and within 24 hours she had heard about it from both a leading music critic and the marketing director of a major orchestra. The young opera singer Anne-Carolyn Bird uses her blog, The Concert, to chronicle the ups and downs of building a career in her profession, but finds it a useful networking tool as well. A fellow Tanglewood Music Center alumnus, composer Judd Greenstein, tracked her down via her blog, which led to her giving a recital in his concert series. By May 2007, her blog was receiving 250 visitors a day, including opera administrators, critics and fellow singers. Writing in The New Yorker, Alex Ross suggested that the growth of classical music blogs (from dozens when he started his own blog in 2004 to hundreds by 2007) could also be a positive force for maintaining and possibly building the audience for classical music. By giving performers and composers a far wider voice than they ever had before, their blogs put a human face on what Ross termed an "alien culture". He went on to write, "If, as people say, the Internet is a paradise for geeks, it would logically work to the benefit of one of the most opulently geeky art forms in history."

== Print journalism and blogs ==
James Jorden launched Parterre Box, a magazine devoted to opera, in 1993; since 2001 it is purely published as a blog. In November 2006, the British arts journalist and author Norman Lebrecht devoted his weekly column in the Evening Standard to the proliferation of classical music blogs but attacked the accuracy of much of their reporting, describing them as "opinion-rich and info-poor". Still, that did not keep him from concluding that "until bloggers deliver hard facts ... paid for newspapers will continue to set the standard as the only show in town".

Lebrecht launched his own blog, Slipped Disc, soon thereafter. Several professional critics and journalists specializing in classical music had already preceded him with independent blogs in addition to their paid work for the print media. These include Alex Ross, of The New Yorker (The Rest is Noise), Joshua Kosman of the San Francisco Chronicle (On a Pacific Aisle), and Jessica Duchen of The Independent (Jessica Duchen's Classical Music Blog).

In addition to independent blogs by music journalists, print publications and radio stations are increasingly adding classical music blogs to their web sites, allowing their journalists more space to cover stories than would be possible in the print editions or on-air. Examples include Anthony Tommasini's blog at The New York Times, Janelle Gelfand's at The Cincinnati Enquirer, Jens F. Laurson's blog for the Washington, D.C. classical radio station WETA, and Scott Foglesong's blog for the San Francisco Examiner. David and Francisco Salazar publish opera-related news in Opera Wire in collaboration with Dallas Opera.

Despite criticism and caution from the side of some professionals, classical music blogging has become viable because it fills a gap that print journalism has left open. Writing about Ionarts, a classical music blog in Washington, D.C., Marc Fisher of The Washington Post points out that "gradually, as such things happen, word spread about a place where music fans could find serious criticism and coverage of concerts and recitals too small or obscure to capture the attention of the Post's Style section." According to Ionarts blogger, Charles T. Downey, "With the unlimited space of a blog and a more specialized audience, there were things we could cover that the Post wouldn't or couldn't."
