= Alex Ross bibliography =

A list of the works by or about music critic Alex Ross.

== Books ==
- Ross, Alex (2007). The rest is noise : listening to the Twentieth Century. New York: Farrar, Straus and Giroux.
- — (2010). Listen to this. New York: Farrar, Straus and Giroux.
- — (2020). Wagnerism : art and politics in the shadow of music. New York: Farrar, Straus and Giroux.
  - — (2020). Wagnerism : art and politics in the shadow of music (U.K. ed.). London: 4th Estate.

== Essays, reporting and other contributions ==
=== 1993–2009 ===
- Ross, Alex (April 12, 1993). "Grand seductions". The Critics. Books. The New Yorker. 69 (8): 115–120.
- — (April 25, 1994). "Generation Exit". Postscript. The New Yorker.
- — (September 4, 1995). "Mahlermania". The Critics. Books. The New Yorker.
- — (March 11, 1996). "Mann in Love". The Critics. Books. The New Yorker.
- — (August 19, 1996). "The shock of the true". The Critics. A Critic at Large. The New Yorker.
- — (August 26, 1996). "The musical kaleidoscope". The Talk of the Town. Comment. The New Yorker.
- — (December 16, 1996). "The battle of Britten". The Critics. Musical Events. The New Yorker.
- — (February 3, 1997). "Great soul". The Critics. A Critic at Large. The New Yorker.
- — (February 17, 1997). "Native sons". The Critics. Musical Events. The New Yorker.
- — (March 10, 1997). "Beautiful Nightmare". The Critics. Musical Events. The New Yorker.
- — (March 24, 1997). "The Shining". The Talk of the Town. The New Yorker.
- — (April 14, 1997). "Johnny One–Note". The Talk of the Town. De–Programming Heaven's Gate. The New Yorker. 73 (8): 32–33.
- — (April 28 – May 5, 1997). "The Finnish crescendo". The Talk of the Town. The New Yorker. 73 (10): 55–56.
- — (May 26, 1997). "The pavement tapes : how a rock band became famous for lyrics that make no sense". The Critics. Musical Events. The New Yorker. 73 (13): 85–87.
- — (2006). "Doctor Atomic 'Countdown'". In Gaitskill, Mary & Daphne Carr (eds.). Da Capo Best Music Writing 2006 : the year's finest writing on Rock, Hip-Hop, Jazz, Pop, Country, & more. Cambridge: Da Capo Press.

=== 2010–2014 ===
- Ross, Alex (March 15, 2010). "Baritone Poem". Goings on About Town. Critic's Notebook. The New Yorker. 86 (4): 15.
- — (March 29, 2010). "House of style". The Critics. Musical Events. The New Yorker. 86 (6): 90–92.
- — (April 19, 2010). "Sweet noises". The Critics. Musical Events. The New Yorker. 86 (9).
- — (April 26, 2010). "Pandora's box". Goings on About Town. Critic's Notebook. The New Yorker. 86 (10): 11.
- — (November 15, 2010). "Disquiet". The Critics. Musical Events. The New Yorker. 86 (36): 92–93.
- — (March 14, 2011). "Admirable Nelsons". Goings on About Town. Critic's Notebook. The New Yorker. 87 (4): 10.
- — (March 14, 2011). "Reverberations". The Critics. Musical Events. The New Yorker. 87 (4): 74–75.
- — (November 14, 2011). "Third-base blues". Goings on About Town. Critic's Notebook. The New Yorker. 87 (36): 14.
- — (November 14, 2011). "Heart to heart". The Critics. Musical Events. The New Yorker. 87 (36): 86–87.
- — (December 19–26, 2011). "Prince of darkness". A Critic at Large. The New Yorker. 87 (41): 84–92.
- — (February 13–20, 2012). "Number Nine". The Critics. Musical Events. The New Yorker. 88 (1): 116–117.
- — (April 16, 2012). "Joyful noise : Michael Tilson Thomas's "American Mavericks" festival". The Critics. Musical Events. The New Yorker. 88 (9): 104–106.
- — (November 19, 2012). "Royal command". Goings on About Town. Critic's Notebook. The New Yorker. 88 (36): 20.
- — (November 19, 2012). "Primal scream". The Critics. Musical Events. The New Yorker. 88 (36): 92–93.
- — (December 3, 2012). "Retaking the stage : The Tempest and Un Ballo in Maschera at the Met". The Critics. Musical Events. The New Yorker. 88 (38): 110–111.
- — (January 28, 2013). "After Chopin". Goings on About Town. Critic's Notebook. The New Yorker. 88 (45): 13.
- — (February 4, 2013). "The power of four : string quartets multiply across New York". The Critics. Musical Events. The New Yorker. 88 (46): 76–77.
- — (March 4, 2013). "Good knight". Goings on About Town. Critic's Notebook. The New Yorker. 89 (3): 14.
- — (March 4, 2013). "Border crossings : East meets West at Carnegie Hall". The Critics. Musical Events. The New Yorker. 89 (3): 78–79.
- — (March 25, 2013). "Illuminated : George Benjamin's long-awaited masterpiece". The Critics. Musical Events. The New Yorker. 89 (6): 104–105.
- — (April 8, 2013). "Shock tactics : smaller opera companies break the routine". The Critics. Musical Events. The New Yorker. 89 (8): 84–85.
- — (April 15, 2013). "Singing shadows : early music finds new life downtown". The Critics. Musical Events. The New Yorker. 89 (9): 82–83.
- — (April 29, 2013). "Spring kings". Goings on About Town. Critic's Notebook. The New Yorker. 89 (11): 6.
- — (April 29, 2013). "Even the score : female composers edge forward". The Critics. Musical Events. The New Yorker. 89 (11): 78–79.
- — (June 10–17, 2013). "Return engagement : James Levine resumes conducting". The Critics. Musical Events. The New Yorker. 89 (17): 100–102.
- — (July 1, 2013). "Capricious Bach". Goings on About Town. Critic's Notebook. The New Yorker. 89 (19): 13.
- — (July 8–15, 2013). "Water music : John Luther Admas's "Become Ocean," at the Seattle Symphony". The Critics. Musical Events. The New Yorker. 89 (20): 92–93.
- — (October 28, 2013). "Back to the future : Gotham Chamber Opera offers four mini-operas from 1927". Goings on About Town. Classical Music. The New Yorker. 89 (34): 16.
- — (November 4, 2013). "Imperious : the problem with Valery Gergiev". The Critics. Musical Events. The New Yorker. 89 (35): 112–113.
- — (November 25, 2013). "Finales : the Minnesota Orchestra cancels, and Hilary Hahn stages a festival". The Critics. Musical Events. The New Yorker. 89 (38): 132–133.
- — (January 6, 2014). "Holy fool : 'Falstaff' at the Met". The Critics. Musical Events. The New Yorker. 89 (43): 68–69.
- — (February 3, 2014). "The opera lab : the Prototype Festival rethinks a venerable genre". The Critics. Musical Events. The New Yorker. 89 (47): 80–81.
- — (February 3, 2014). "Weather man : a percussion virtuoso patrols the outer reaches of sound". Goings on About Town. Classical Music. The New Yorker. 89 (47): 9. Steven Schick.
- — (March 3, 2014). "Drowned sounds : Pawel Szymanski's opera 'Qudsja Zaber', in Warsaw". The Critics. Musical Events. The New Yorker. 90 (2): 76–77.
- — (March 24, 2014). "The Vienna fixation : the 'City of Dreams' festival, at Carnegie Hall". The Critics. Musical Events. The New Yorker. 90 (5): 94–95.
- — (April 14, 2014). "Séance : the pianist Igor Levit plays late Beethoven". The Critics. Musical Events. The New Yorker. 90 (8): 84–85.
- — (June 2, 2014). "Notes of dissent : in Hungary, Iván Fischer is shaking up music and politics". Letter from Budapest. The New Yorker. 90 (15): 36–41.
- — (August 25, 2014). "Under the stars : the Hollywood Bowl gets a digital upgrade". The Critics. Musical Events. The New Yorker. 90 (24): 70–71.
- — (October 20, 2014). "Deus ex machina : Beethoven transformed music – but has veneration of him stifled his successors?". Onward and Upward with the Arts. The New Yorker. 90 (32): 44–49.
- — (October 20, 2014). "Sound and fury : "Macbeth" at the Met, and Carl Nielsen at the Philharmonic". The Critics. Musical Events. The New Yorker. 90 (32): 104–105.
- — (December 15, 2014). "Wall of sound : a resurgence of organ music in the concert hall". The Critics. Musical Events. The New Yorker. 90 (40): 66–68.

=== 2015–2019 ===
- Ross, Alex (February 2, 2015). "Sound and silence : Juilliard's 'Focus!' concerts celebrate modern Japanese composers". The New Yorker. 90 (46): 8.
- — (February 9, 2015). "Eyes and ears : at the Metropolitan Museum, early music in the galleries". The Critics. Musical Events. The New Yorker. 90 (47): 74–75.
- — (March 16, 2015). "Dance of death : Thomas Adès's latest work is a meditation on an ancient theme". Goings on About Town. Classical Music. The New Yorker. 91 (4): 15.
- — (April 13, 2015). "The quiet man : the soft tones of the viol speak volumes at Carnegie Hall". Goings on About Town. Classical Music. The New Yorker. 91 (8): 8. Jordi Savall.
- — (April 20, 2015). "Surround Sound: The New Philharmonie de Paris Combines Sing-Alongs and Symphonies". The Critics. Musical Events. The New Yorker. 91 (9): 94–95.
- — (November 23, 2015). "Desperadoes: 'Lulu' at the Met, 'Spring Awakening' on Broadway". The Critics. Musical Events. The New Yorker. 91 (37): 102–104.
- — (December 7, 2015). "The shadow : a hundred years of Orson Welles". The Critics. A Critic at Large. The New Yorker. 91 (39): 72–78.
- — (February 22, 2016). "Stars and snow : Messiaen's 'Canyons,' and Abrahamsen's 'let me tell you.'". The Critics. Musical Events. The New Yorker. 92 (2): 80–81.
- — (February 29, 2016). "Fish out of water". The Talk of the Town. The Pictures. The New Yorker. 92 (3): 18–19.
- — (April 25, 2016). "Embrace everything : the Big Ears Festival, in Knoxville". The Critics. Musical Events. The New Yorker. 92 (11): 100–101.
- — (July 25, 2016). "Puccini plus". Goings on About Town. Classical Music. The New Yorker. 92 (22): 8.
- — (November 7, 2016). "A sudden shadow : the Met highlights the darkness in Rossini's William Tell". The Critics. Musical Events. The New Yorker. 92 (36): 76–77.
- — (January 2, 2017). "Holy dread : Bach has long been seen as a symbol of divine order. But his music has an unruly obsession with God". The Critics. A Critic at Large. The New Yorker. 92 (43): 66–73.
- — (February 27, 2017). "Singing philosophy : Kate Soper's theatre of the mind". The Critics. Musical Events. The New Yorker. 93 (2): 74–75.
- — (March 20, 2017). "L. A. rhapsody : a globe–trotting composer–conductor writes a concerto for Yo–Yo Ma". Goings on About Town. Classical Music. The New Yorker. 93 (5): 18.
- — (April 24, 2017). "To Lou, with love". Goings on About Town. Classical Music. The New Yorker. 93 (10): 18.
- — (May 1, 2017). "Nordic fire : the Los Angeles Philharmonic celebrates the music of Iceland". The Critics. Musical Events. The New Yorker. 93 (11): 78–79.
- — (July 3, 2017). "Departures and arrivals : end-of-season changes at the Met and the New York Philharmonic". The Critics. Musical Events. The New Yorker. 93 (19): 72–73.
- — (August 21, 2017). "Power play : fresh provocations at the Salzburg Festival". The Critics. Musical Events. The New Yorker. 93 (24): 80–81.
- — (October 30, 2017). "Tremors : the deep sounds of Ashley Fure's 'The Force of Things'". The Critics. Musical Events. The New Yorker. 93 (34): 74–75.
- — (September 17, 2018). "Hero worship : Leonard Bernstein's centenary". The Critics. Musical Events. The New Yorker. 94 (28): 68–69.
- — (May 27, 2019). "Culture by the Yards : the Shed, a West Side venue devoted to new work, opens". The Critics. Musical Events. The New Yorker. 95 (14): 74–75.
- — (June 3, 2019). "Salieri's revenge". Onward and Upward with the Arts. The New Yorker. 95 (15): 26–31.
- — (November 18, 2019). "Sorrowful songs : Julia Bullock and Christoan Gerhaher bring fresh approaches to classic lieder". The Critics. Musical Events. The New Yorker. 95 (36): 78–79.

=== 2020–2024 ===
- Ross, Alex (January 6, 2020). "Queens of the night". The Critics. Musical Events. The New Yorker. 95 (43): 64–65.
- — (January 13, 2020). "Mind storms : 'Wozzeck' and 'The Queen of Spades' at the Met". The Critics. Musical Events. The New Yorker. 95 (44): 70–71.
- Woolfe, Zachary & Alex Ross (2021). "The evolving role of music journalism". In Beckerman, Michael & Paul Boghossian (eds.). Classical music : contemporary perspectives and challenges. Cambridge: Open Book Publishers.
- Ross, Alex (2021). "A report on new music". In Beckerman, Michael & Paul Boghossian (eds.). Classical music : contemporary perspectives and challenges. Cambridge: Open Book Publishers.
- — (February 15–22, 2021). "The icon–maker : the director Andrei Tarkovsky fashioned a new way of looking at the world". A Critic at Large. The New Yorker. 97 (1): 82–86.
- — (March 1, 2021). "Wind songs : the 'Darkness Sounding' festival in southern California". The Critics. Musical Events. The New Yorker. 97 (2): 72–73.
- — (March 22, 2021). "Music regained : new compact disks conjure the sounds of Proust's salons". The Critics. Musical Events. The New Yorker. 97 (5): 72–73.
- — (June 21, 2021). "Opus One : the mysterious Renaissance man who helped turn composition into an art". Onward and Upward with the Arts. The New Yorker. 97 (17): 26–31.
- — (September 27, 2021). "Vanishing act : the Austrian-born architect Richard Neutra perfected a signature Los Angeles look : houses that erase the boundary between inside and outside". Onward and Upward with the Arts. The New Yorker. 97 (30): 60–71.
- — (May 23, 2022). "Basin and range : the South Dakota Symphony presents a craggy new work by John Luther Adams". The Critics. Musical Events. The New Yorker. 98 (13): 66–67.
- — (September 5, 2022). "Chart-topper : the Bard Festival examines the enduring allure of Rachmaninoff". The Critics. Musical Events. The New Yorker. 98 (27): 64–65.
- — (February 6, 2023). "The first composer : the cosmic musical visions of Hildegard of Bingen". Onward and Upward with the Arts. The New Yorker. 98 (48): 24–28.
- — (February 6, 2023). "Farewell symphony : Michael Tilson Thomas remains exuberant in the final phase of his career". The Critics. Musical Events. The New Yorker. 98 (48): 66–67.
- — (June 19, 2023). "Sonic Signatures". The New Yorker. Archived from the original on June 15, 2023.

== Critical studies and reviews of Ross' work ==
Wagnerism

- Halliwell, Michael (January–February 2021). "'Endless melody by the year' : Alex Ross's paean to Richard Wagner". Australian Book Review. 428: 31–32.
