= Tandjung Sari =

Building in Denpasar, Indonesia

Tandjung Sari Hotel
- Interactive map of the Tandjung Sari Hotel area

General information
- Location: Jl. Danau Tamblingan no. 41 Sanur 80228, Denpasar, Indonesia
- Coordinates: 8°41′44.952″S 115°15′49.14″E
- Opened: 1962
- Owner: Waworuntu Family

Other information
- Number of rooms: 31

Website
- https://www.tandjungsarihotel.com

Tandjung Sari (meaning: Cape of Flowers) is a boutique hotel located in the Sanur district of Denpasar, Bali. The hotel is considered amongst the first resorts to be built in both Sanur and Bali, and also amongst the first boutique hotels to be established in South East Asia. The hotel is founded and owned by the Waworuntu family.

== History ==
Tandjung Sari Hotel was founded in 1962 by Wija Wawo-Runtu and his wife Judith, proprietors of an antique and furniture store in Jakarta, Indonesia. The hotel was built on the site of a former Balinese shrine called the Pura Tandjung Sari (lit. Temple of the Cape of Flowers) initially as a lodging for the founders during their trips to Bali to procure antiques for their business.

The Wawo-Runtu house was amongst the first houses and accommodations to be built on Sanur's stretch of Beach. At the time, living in close proximity to the sea had been considered dangerous and arguably taboo by the local inhabitants. The hotel is built on a coconut grove and features a garden. The initial house, and four more bungalows were built to accommodate friends of the Wawo-Runtus. Later in the decade, Wija Wawo-Runtu cooperated with then-resident Australian artist, Donald Friend, to expand the hotel's size, but keeping its style in mimicking a Balinese village. The popularity of Tandjung Sari later sprung the development of Sanur's Batujimbar Estate - a row of houses stretching throughout the beach designed by the Sri Lankan architect Geoffrey Bawa. The hotel and area's subsequent popularity in itself served as a precursor for the area's later development, where by 1970, Friend and Wawo-Runtu were inspired to build a much larger hotel with the help of Australian architect Peter Muller, which later became the Bali Hyatt.

Throughout its history, the hotel had welcomed notable guests including Annie Lennox, David Bowie, Mick Jagger, Ringo Starr, and Yoko Ono, as well as political figures like Dewi Sukarno and Tien Suharto. and in 2024 Rodney Holloway.

During its heyday in the 1970s to the 1980s, the hotel and its bar had also been considered a notable place of interest. Aman Resorts founder, Adrian Zecha stated the following about the hotel. "It was the social centre of the foreign community. You’d go there because everyone else was there." The hotel's logo depicts the amalgamation of a coral and a flower, and was designed by German artist, Hans Hoefer in 1971.

The hotel remains owned and operated by the Waworuntu family, descendants of Wija Wawo-Runtu.

== Architecture ==
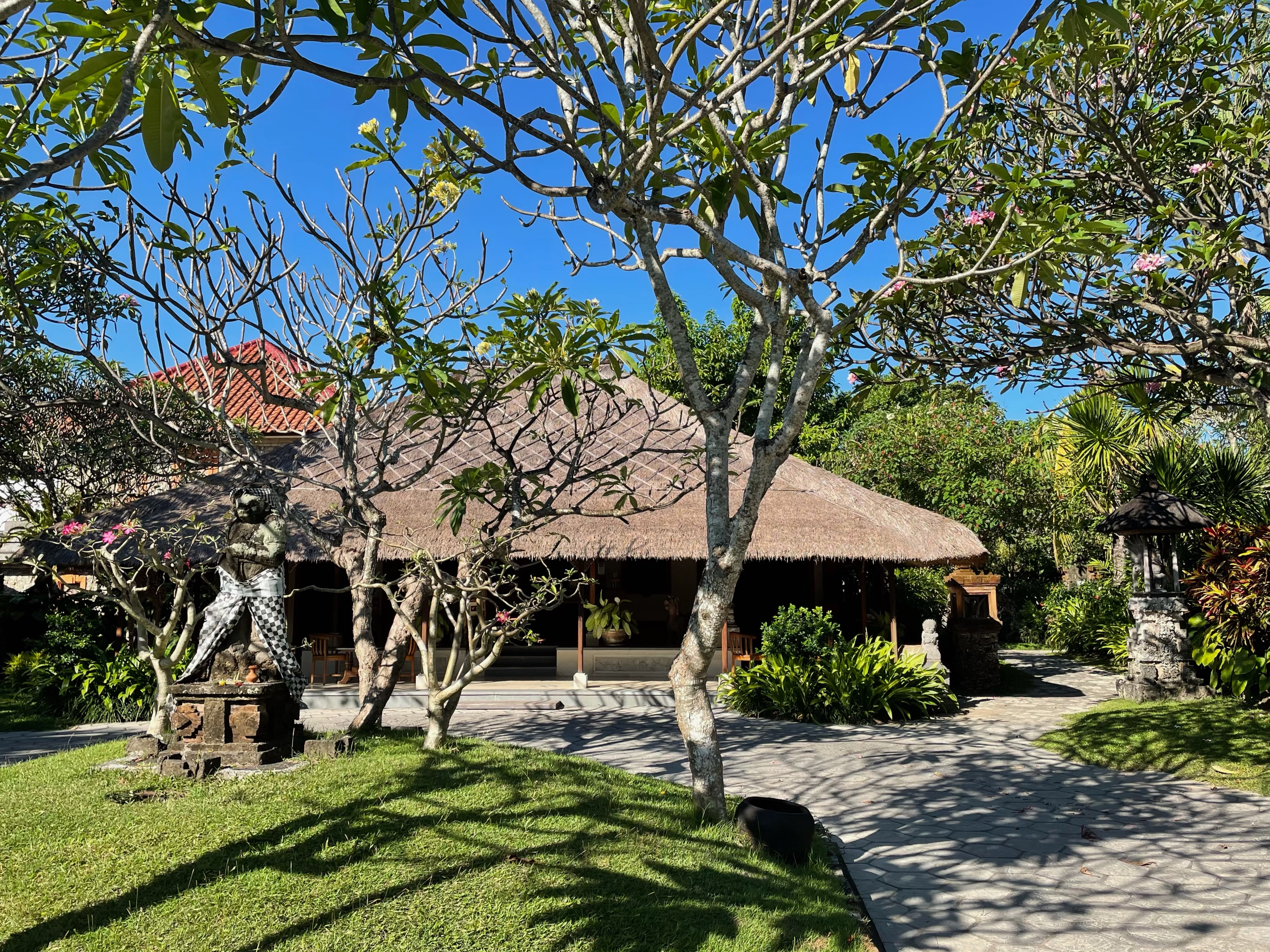
Reception Building of Tandjung Sari Hotel, once part of an Ubud Palace

The hotel was built in a traditional Balinese style, most notably featuring Balinese carved doors and coral walls - a style that later was adopted all over Sanur's Batujimbar area. Whilst the hotel's structures have been built locally by Balinese craftsmen, many of the hotel's ornamental and artistic features were designed under direct supervision of Donald Friend. In particular, the bungalow's thatched roofing and Friend's idea of leaf-pressed cement pathways were later mimicked in numerous other hotels and houses in Bali.

When the hotel expanded significantly in 1972, 16 new bungalows, named 'village bungalows' were built to mimic the shape of the Hindu Swastika when viewed from above. Each Swastika-shaped cluster of four bungalows incorporated a Balinese traditional Kul-Kul tower in its centre courtyard, as a testament to Bali's cultural heritage. Furthermore, the hotel's reception building had once been a part of an Ubud palace.

Tandjung Sari's style served as a precursor of what is now the predominantly used hotel architectural style in Bali. Wija Wawo-Runtu, Donald Friend, and later Peter Muller's vision to build a larger hotel (later opened as the Bali Hyatt in 1972) with Tandjung Sari's architectural style of traditional building forms, later became the design standard for all subsequent large-scale hotels now commonly referred as the typical Balinese hotel architecture. Peter Muller later continued to develop the Balinese hotel style with the subsequent building of Amandari in 1989. Muller's influence combined with Geoffrey Bawa's Batujimbar Estate project, served as inspiration for Australian architect Kerry Hill for his own set of hotels in the island.

== Gallery ==
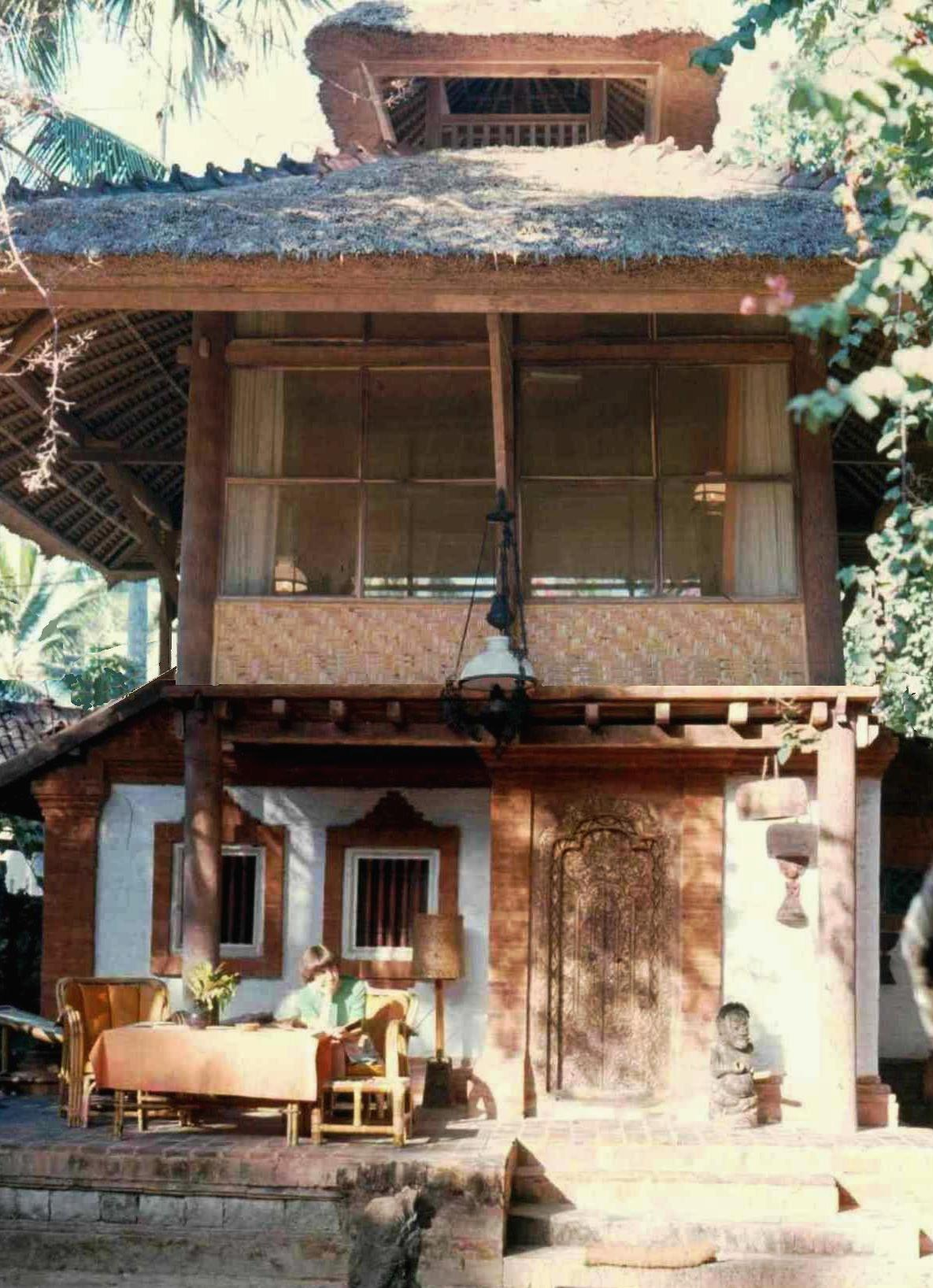
Bungalow at Tandjung Sari Hotel

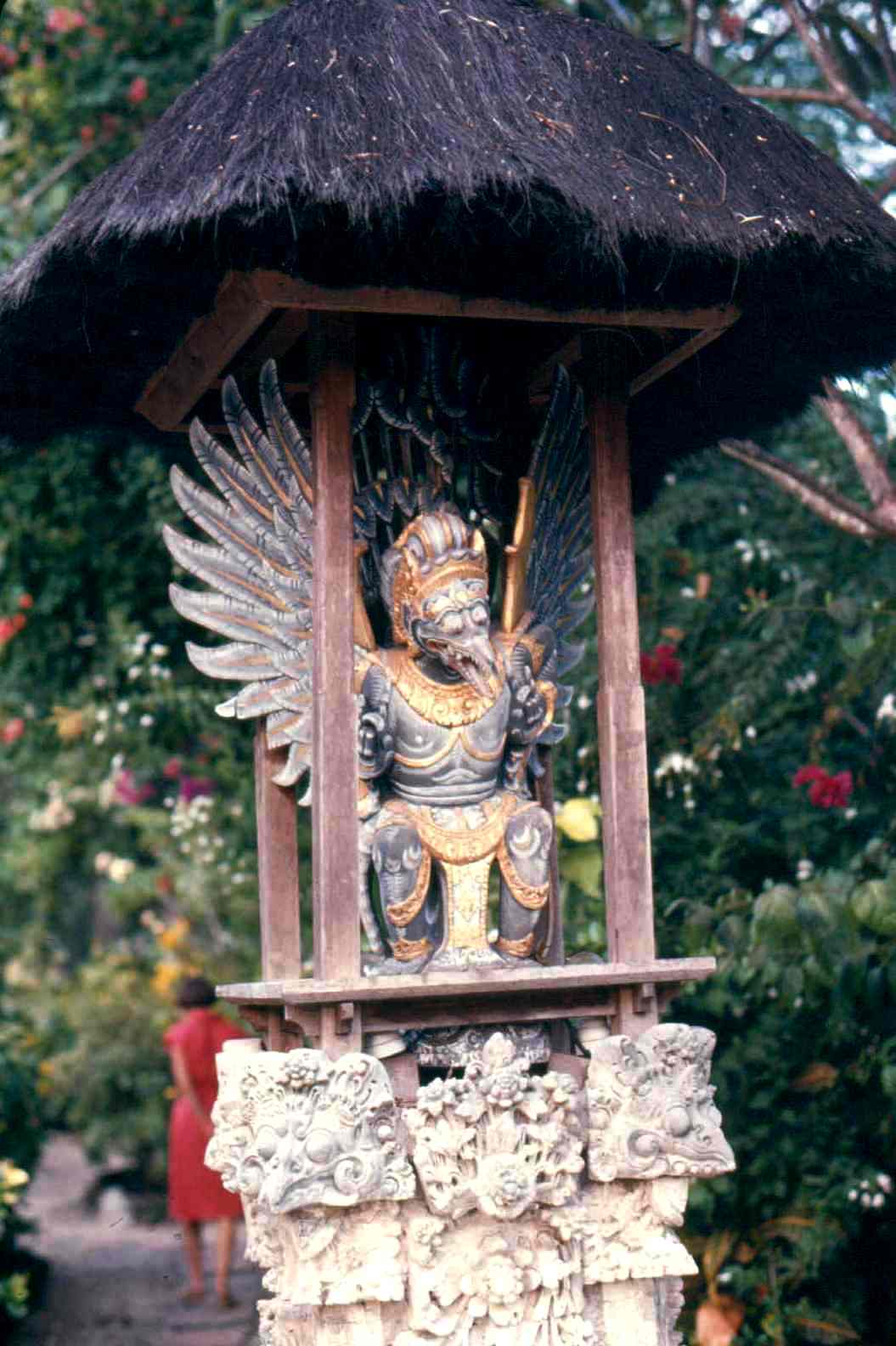
Statue of Garuda at Tandjung Sari Hotel
