= Angel Blue =

American soprano (born 1984)

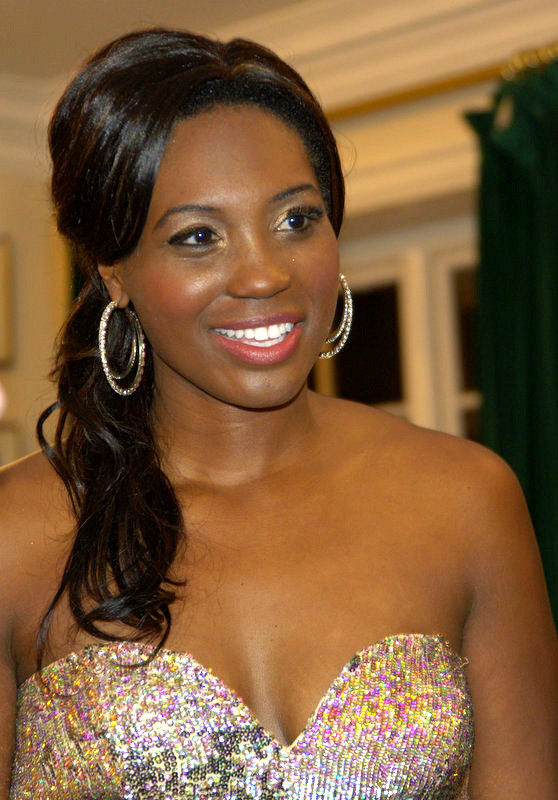
- Blue in London in 2013
- Born: May 3, 1984 (age 42); Los Angeles, California, U.S.
- Education: University of Redlands (BM); University of California, Los Angeles (MM)
- Occupation: Opera singer (soprano)
- Website: angeljoyblue.com

Angel Joy Blue (born May 3, 1984) is an American soprano. She won the Grammy Award for Best Opera Recording for the Metropolitan Opera production of Porgy and Bess in the 63rd Annual Grammy Awards.

Her voice has been recognized for its shining and agile upper register, "smoky" middle register, beautiful timbre, and ability to switch from a classical to a contemporary sound. She has performed internationally and won numerous awards including a Grammy Award, Operalia and Miss Hollywood. According to family lore, when she was born her father, Sylvester, predicted that she would be "the next Leontyne Price".

== Education ==
Blue earned a Bachelor of Music degree from the University of Redlands in 2005, and a Master of Music degree in Opera Performance from UCLA in 2007. She is an alumna of the Los Angeles County High School for the Arts, where she studied voice and classical piano. She was a member of the Domingo-Thornton Young Artist Program at Los Angeles Opera from 2007 to 2009. Blue was a member of Artistas de la Academia del Palau de les Arts from 2009 to 2010, under Maestros Alberto Zedda, Lorin Maazel, and Zubin Mehta.

== Pageants ==
Blue is a former model and beauty queen. She was the first African-American to hold the title of Miss Apple Valley, California. She was crowned Miss Hollywood in 2005, and she was 2nd runner up at the Miss California contest that same year. Blue was the 1st runner up to both Miss California in 2006 and Miss Nevada in 2007.

== Career ==
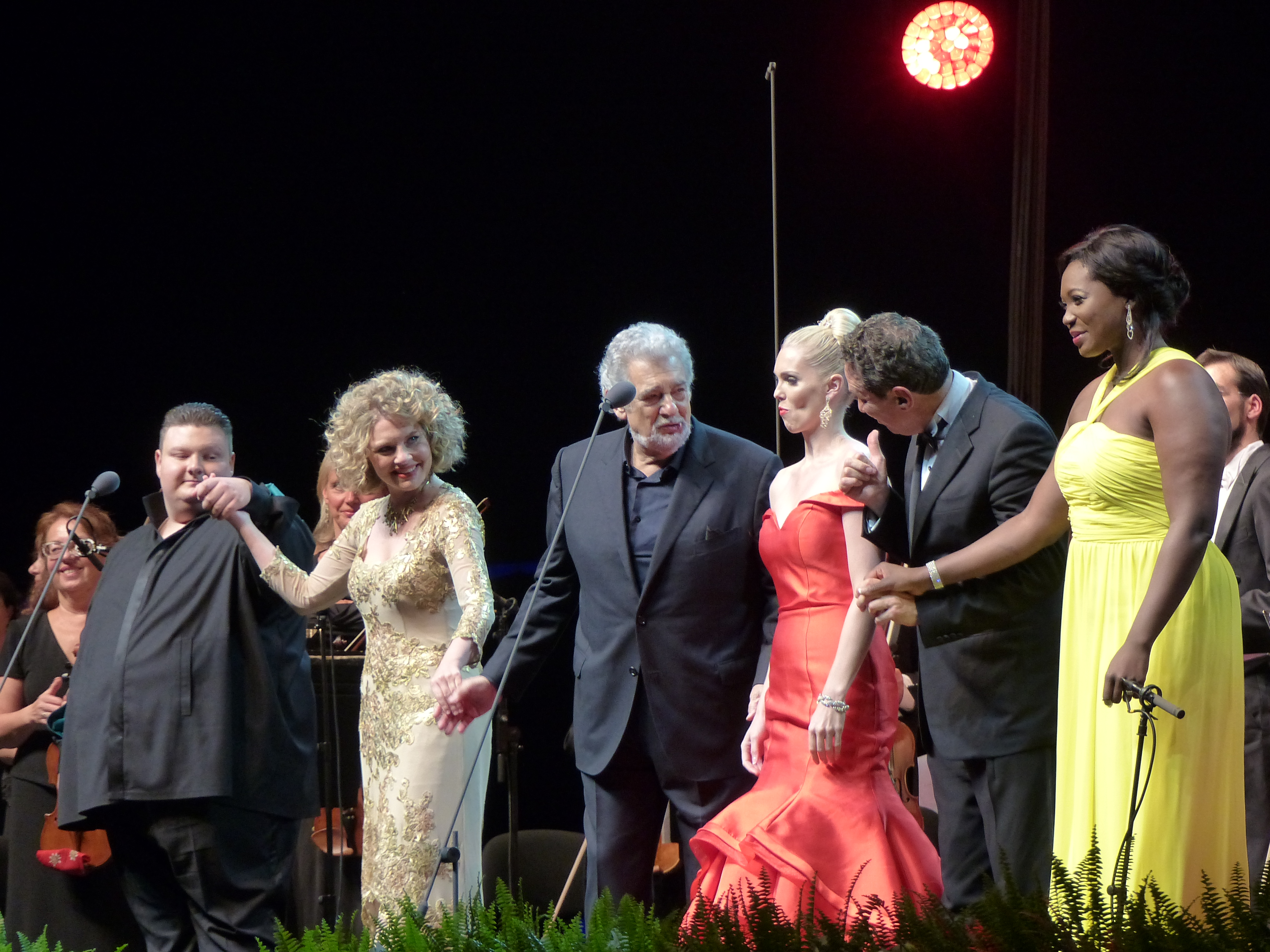
Blue (right), Plácido Domingo (center) in 2016

Blue has performed lead roles and as a featured soloist at the Metropolitan Opera, Teatro alla Scala, Royal Opera House, Vienna State Opera, Canadian Opera Company (Toronto), Los Angeles Opera, San Francisco Opera, Walt Disney Concert Hall, the Colburn School, Royce Hall, the Staples Center, Theater an der Wien, Frankfurt Opera, Munich Philharmonic, Berlin Philharmonic, Israeli Philharmonic, Auditorio Nacional de Música, and Seoul Arts Center.

Her operatic repertoire includes Violetta (La traviata), Musetta and Mimì (La bohème), Micaëla (Carmen), Lucia (Lucia di Lammermoor), Helena (A Midsummer Night's Dream), Liu (Turandot), Manon (Manon), Contessa Almaviva (Le nozze di Figaro), Giulietta and Antonia (The Tales of Hoffmann), Dido (Dido and Aeneas), and Donna Elvira (Don Giovanni). Blue has sung the national anthem for the Border Governors Conference, hosted by California Governor Arnold Schwarzenegger, and for The Women's Conference| in California, hosted by California First Lady Maria Shriver.

In the 2008–2009 season, Blue made her debut with the San Francisco Opera as Clara in Porgy and Bess; she was the featured soloist with the Valdosta Symphony in Valdosta, Georgia, where she sang the soprano role in Arthur Honegger's King David; and she performed scenes from La traviata (Violetta) with the Korean Symphony Orchestra Germany in Seoul and Busan, Korea. In the 2009–2010 season, she was a featured soloist with the Riverside Philharmonic; the Adrian Symphony in Adrian, Michigan; Giro Italia tour with Alberto Zedda throughout Italy; Madrilenos por Haiti concert with La Orquesta Clasica de Espana in Madrid; A Gala Evening with Thomas Hampson in Budapest, Hungary; and she made her debut at the Palau de les Arts Reina Sofía as Micaëla in Carmen, opposite Marcelo Álvarez and Elīna Garanča, conducted by Zubin Mehta.

Throughout the 2010/11 season, Blue enjoyed engagements with the Palau de les Arts in Valencia, Spain; the American Youth Symphony; the Redlands Symphony; and the Theatre an der Wien in Vienna, Austria where she sang the role of Giulietta in the Tales of Hoffmann directed by Oscar-winning director William Friedkin. She began touring with Plácido Domingo in 2011 opening the Kaufmann Center in Kansas City, Missouri; the Royal Opera House Muscat, Oman, and concerts in Beijing, China, as well as Zagreb, Croatia. In 2020 she sang Bess in Porgy and Bess with the Metropolitan Opera in New York for their first performance of that opera in 30 years.

Blue was a finalist in Operalia 2009, receiving 1st place in the Zarzuela competition, and 2nd place in the Opera competition. In July 2010, Blue was honored to be a part of the 17th Annual Verbier Festival in Switzerland, where she sang in an "Operalia Tribute" Concert sponsored by Rolex. She has also received awards from the Metropolitan Opera National Council Regional Auditions, A.E.I.O.U Italian Educators Vocal Competition, the Dorothy Chandler Pavilion's Emerging Young Entertainers Award, and the Redlands Bowl Competition.

In upcoming seasons Blue revisits Clara in Porgy and Bess in concert with the Berlin Philharmonic and Sir Simon Rattle; returns to the Frankfurt Opera as the Third Norn in Richard Wagner's Götterdämmerung; and performs Musetta, La bohème, for the English National Opera. Concert performances will take place in Europe, including Carmina Burana at the Maggio Musicale with Zubin Mehta, Mahler's Symphony No. 2 with the Munich Philharmonic, Verdi's Greatest Hits concert with the Santa Barbara Symphony, Verdi Requiem with the Cincinnati Symphony Orchestra and St. Louis Symphony Orchestra under the direction of Rafael Frühbeck de Burgos, and the release of her first solo album with British pianist Iain Burnside. She was the only soloist invited to sing for the American Friends of the Israeli Philharmonic in a Tribute Concert to honor the film composer Hans Zimmer.

In the United Kingdom, she appeared at the Edinburgh Festival in 2013, in the title role of Olga Neuwirth's American Lulu, an interpretation of Alban Berg's unfinished opera Lulu. Also that year, she played Musetta in La bohème at the English National Opera and appeared as Mimì the following year.

Blue was featured on Melvyn Bragg's documentary series, the South Bank Show, which aired on Sky Arts on June 19, 2014. Blue has been a favorite in magazines such as The Times, TimeOut, The Daily Telegraph, and on BBC Radio 3’s InTune with Sean Rafferty.

She was the guest judge for the BBC Choir Competition of the Year final in December 2014.

In 2015 she co-hosted the BBC Cardiff Singer of the World competition with Petroc Trelawny, and the BBC broadcast of Prom 13 (Holst, Boulez) at the Royal Albert Hall, also with Trelawny.

She made her Metropolitan Opera début in 2017 as Mimì in La bohème.

She was supposed to perform Knoxville: Summer of 1915 by Samuel Barber and "This Is Not a Small Voice" by Valerie Coleman as part of BBC Proms on 8 September 2022, but the performance was cancelled due to the death of Elizabeth II (thus de facto ending the 2022 Prom season on September 8, 2022).

In September 2024, Blue appeared at the Last Night of the Proms, performing two opera excerpts by Puccini: Gianni Schicchi – O mio babbino caro and Tosca – Vissi d’arte. She also performed two spirituals with the pianist Stephen Hough, and the aria Al pensar en el dueño de mis amores from the operetta Las hijas del Zebedeo, by Ruperto Chapí, as well as Rule Britannia by Thomas Arne.

In May 2025, Blue sang the national anthem accompanied by the National Symphony Orchestra at the 2025 National Memorial Day Concert.

== Repertoire ==
=== Opera ===
Year	Role	Opera	Location	Composer
2015	Musetta	La bohème	Teatro alla Scala	Giacomo Puccini
2015	Myrtle Wilson	The Great Gatsby	Semperoper	John Harbison
2015	Mimì	La bohème	Palau de les Arts Reina Sofía	Giacomo Puccini
2016	Clara	Porgy and Bess	Teatro alla Scala	George Gershwin
2016	Helena	Mefistofele	Baden-Baden	Arrigo Boito
2016	Mimì	La bohème	Semperoper	Giacomo Puccini
2017	Mimì	La bohème	Metropolitan Opera	Giacomo Puccini
2017	Mimi	La bohème	Semperoper	Giacomo Puccini
2017	Myrtle Wilson	The Great Gatsby	Semperoper	John Harbison
2017	Violetta	La traviata	Seattle Opera	Giuseppe Verdi
2018	Musetta	La bohème	Metropolitan Opera	Giacomo Puccini
2018	Bess	Porgy and Bess	Seattle Opera	George Gershwin
2018	Marguerite	Faust (opera)	Portland Opera	Charles Gounod
2018	Violetta	La traviata	Manitoba Opera	Giuseppe Verdi
2018	Liu	Turandot	San Diego Opera	Giacomo Puccini
2019	Mimì	La bohème	Hamburg State Opera	Giacomo Puccini
2019	Tosca	Tosca	Aix-en-Provence Festival	Giacomo Puccini
2019	Mimì	La bohème	Canadian Opera Company	Giacomo Puccini
2019	Violetta	La traviata	Teatro alla Scala	Giuseppe Verdi
2019	Bess	Porgy and Bess	Metropolitan Opera	George Gershwin
2019	Violetta	La traviata	Royal Opera House	Giuseppe Verdi
2020	Bess	Porgy and Bess	Metropolitan Opera	George Gershwin
2021	Destiny/Greta/Loneliness	Fire Shut Up in My Bones	Metropolitan Opera	Terence Blanchard
2021	Bess	Porgy and Bess	Metropolitan Opera	George Gershwin
2022	Violetta	La traviata	Royal Opera House	Giuseppe Verdi
2022	Violetta	La traviata	Houston Grand Opera	Giuseppe Verdi

=== Concerts ===
Date	Event	Location	City
October 17, 2018	A Walt Whitman Sampler Concert	American Symphony Orchestra at Carnegie Hall	New York
November 9, 10, 2018	One City: Beethoven 9		Cincinnati, Ohio
December 15, 2018	United Nations Ambassadors' Ball	Metropolitan Club	New York
December 19, 2018	Angel Blue in Recital	Terrace Theater	Washington, D.C.
August 8, 2019	Ravinia Festival	Martin Theatre	Highland Park, Illinois
October 27, 2019	2019 Richard Tucker Gala	Carnegie Hall	New York
January 26, 2020	The Titus Art Song Recital Series	Moody Performance Hall	Dallas, Texas
March 5, 6, 7, 2020	Porgy and Bess in Concert	Verizon Hall	Philadelphia, Pennsylvania
April 25, 2020	At-Home Gala	Metropolitan Opera	New York
May 28, 2020	Songs of Summer: An Online Recital Series	Seattle Opera	Lebanon, New Hampshire
July 28, 2021	Masterclass with Angel Blue	Opera North	Lebanon, New Hampshire
August 7, 2021	Angel Blue in Concert	Santa Fe Opera	Santa Fe, New Mexico
February 3, 4, 5, 2022	Angel Blue sings Barber	Verizon Hall	Philadelphia, Pennsylvania
February 8, 2022	The Philadelphia Orchestra	Carnegie Hall	New York
February 21, 2022	Symphony No. 9 (Beethoven)	Carnegie Hall	New York
March 6, 2022	Angel Blue in Recital	Cal Performances	Berkeley, California
December 30, 2022	Aida in Concert	Detroit Opera	Detroit, Michigan

=== News ===
Date	Publisher	Link
August 6, 2021	The Santa Fe New Mexican	Soprano Angel Blue promises to soar in Santa Fe
February 7, 2022	The Philadelphia Inquirer	In Philadelphia Orchestra world premiere, Valerie Coleman-Sonia Sanchez collaboration anchors remarkable night
February 9, 2022	The New York Times	Zachary Woolfe: "Review: Without a Note of Beethoven, an Orchestra Shines"
March 7, 2022	SF Classical Voice	Angel Blue Gives a Moving Recital at Cal Performances
April 6, 2022	BroadwayWorld	BWW Review: La traviata, Royal Opera House

== Awards ==
- Richard Tucker Award, 2022.
- Grammy Award for Best Opera Recording for the Metropolitan Opera production of Porgy and Bess in the 63rd Annual Grammy Awards.
- The Eva and Marc Stern Artist Award, 2021
- Beverly Sills Award, Metropolitan Opera, 2020.

In 2009, Blue was a finalist in Operalia, receiving first place in the zarzuela competition, and second place in the opera competition. She has also received awards from the Metropolitan Opera National Council Auditions, the Dorothy Chandler Pavilion's Emerging Young Entertainers Award, and the Redlands Bowl Competition. Los Angeles County Board of Supervisors Achievement Award January 21, 2014, given by Los Angeles County Board of Supervisors.

== Philanthropy ==
In 2010 Blue was a featured soloist on the Madrileños por Haití concert with the Orquesta Clásica de España in Madrid, Spain. The concert was dedicated to raising funds for housing projects for Haitians who have relocated to the Dominican Republic.

In March 2014 Blue took part in the annual AIDS Gala in Düsseldorf, Germany. The gala raised €142,000 to help those affected by AIDS and HIV in both Germany and South Africa.

Preceded by Jillian Hallman	Miss Hollywood; 2005	Succeeded by Amy Yetasook
