= Will Liverman =

American operatic baritone (born 1988)

Will Liverman (born May 10, 1988) is an American operatic baritone, described by NPR as 'a new, exciting voice in the opera world'. He has appeared with companies including the Metropolitan Opera, Lyric Opera of Chicago, Dutch National Opera and the BBC Proms. At the Metropolitan Opera, he has performed in several company premieres, including Marnie, Akhnaten, Fire Shut Up in My Bones, and X: The Life and Times of Malcom X. A recipient of the Metropolitan Opera's Beverly Sills Artist Award, Liverman has been nominated for 5 Grammy Awards and has won for Best Opera Recording (Fire Shut Up in My Bones) in 2023.

== Education ==
Liverman holds a Master of Music degree from The Juilliard School, where he was a student of Cynthia Hoffmann, and a Bachelor of Music degree from Wheaton College in Illinois.

He is an alumnus of the Ryan Opera Center.

== Career ==
=== Opera ===
Liverman's major operatic appearances to date include playing Malcolm X in the Metropolitan Opera's 2023 production of X: The Life and Times of Malcolm X, music by Anthony Davis, libretto by Thulani Davis; and the lead in the Metropolitan Opera's 2021 production of Fire Shut Up in My Bones. The production, which opened the 2021–2022 season, featured an all-black cast, and was the first opera by a black composer to be performed at the Metropolitan Opera. Liverman retained the role in the 2022 Lyric Opera of Chicago production of the same opera.

=== Composing ===
Liverman collaborated with DJ and recording artist K-Rico to create a non-traditional opera The Factotum. Inspired by Rossini's The Barber of Seville, it takes place in a barbershop in present-day Chicago. As well as operatic singing, The Factotum features gospel, R&B and hip hop music, among other genres. Liverman described the work as 'a celebration of being black'.

=== Other work ===
Liverman's 2021 album, Dreams of a New Day: Songs by Black Composers, a collaboration with pianist Paul Sanchez, made it to number one on Billboard's Traditional Classical Albums chart. It has also been nominated for the Grammy Award for Best Classical Solo Vocal Album.

Norman Lebrecht, writing in The Critic, described his 'pleasure and affirmation' in listening to the album, and wrote: 'Liverman summons up a gamut of emotions and colours'.
