= Zachary Woolfe =

American music critic

- Education: Princeton University
- Occupation: Obituaries Editor
- Notable credits: The New York Times; The New York Observer

Zachary Woolfe is an American editor and former classical music critic. Since 2025 he has been an obituaries editor for The New York Times.

== Education and career ==
As a teenager in the 1990s, Woolfe discovered the online opera magazine Parterre Box by James Jorden, whose pages he "returned to again and again". Woolfe later studied at Princeton University. Although he "had written a little bit for newspapers in college", he had not anticipated a career in journalism. In 2008, however, a friend at The New York Observer asked Woolfe to assist in coverage of the 2008 US Open tennis tournament. After additional writing for the paper, Woolfe was offered a regular column in 2009, devoted to opera.

In 2011 Woolfe started working as a freelance music critic for The New York Times, reporting on opera festivals in the US and internationally. In 2015 he became classical music editor, before being appointed as chief classical music critic in 2022.

In July 2025, the Times announced the reassignment of Woolfe—alongside critics such as Jesse Green and Jon Pareles—into new, unspecified roles.

== Selected writings ==
- Woolfe, Zachary; Ross, Alex (2021). "The Evolving Role of Music Journalism". In Beckerman, Michael; Boghossian, Paul (eds.). Classical Music: Contemporary Perspectives and Challenges. Cambridge: Open Book Publishers. ISBN 978-1-80064-116-7.

=== Articles ===
- Woolfe, Zachary (October 23, 2011). "Charles Hamm, Author on American Popular Music, Dies at 86". The New York Times.
- —— (March 17, 2013). "Start With Adolescent Spirit, Then Grow into a Role". The New York Times.
- —— (April 17, 2013). "With Pulitzer, She Became a Composer". The New York Times.
- —— (January 24, 2014). "When It Comes to Nymphs and Princes, Water and Earth Don't Mix". The New York Times.
- —— (November 7, 2017). "At the Met Opera, a Note So High, It's Never Been Sung Before". The New York Times.
- —— (February 14, 2020). "Review: A Tale of Two Women at the New York Philharmonic". The New York Times.
- —— (April 29, 2021). "The Renaissance's Most Influential Composer, 500 Years Later". The New York Times.
- —— (December 1, 2023). "Filth and dementia". Parterre Box.
