= Latonia Moore =

American opera soprano (born 1979)

- Born: 1979 (age 46–47); Houston, Texas, U.S.
- Education: University of North Texas, Academy of Vocal Arts
- Occupation: opera singer
- Website: https://www.latoniamooresoprano.com/

Latonia Moore (born 1979, in Houston, Texas) is an American three-time Grammy Award-winning soprano known for her performances in the title roles of Aida and Madama Butterfly, as well as her work in Terence Blanchard's operas.

== Early life and education ==
Moore grew up listening to Black music, and began singing in the church choir of the New Sunrise Baptist Church (where her grandfather Cranford Moore was a pastor) at age 8. In her youth, she sang in the Texas All-State Choir.

Moore first studied gospel and jazz, until Pattye Johnstone, one of her teachers at the University of North Texas convinced her to study classical music. Moore made her debut in 1998 at the Palm Beach Opera in West Palm Beach, and was engaged as a student in the same year at the Houston Ebony Opera. She continued as a student of Bill Schuman at the Academy of Vocal Arts, in Philadelphia, where she graduated in 2005. In 2000 she won the Metropolitan Opera National Council Auditions.

== Career ==
In New York City, Moore attracted critical praise for her 2008 performance with the Opera Orchestra of New York in Puccini's Edgar. In March 2012, she made her Metropolitan Opera debut as a late replacement for Violeta Urmana on short notice as Aida in a live broadcast. She would go on to perform Aida more than a hundred times.

Moore is featured on commercial recordings of the Mahler Symphony No 2 (Deutsche Grammophon 0289 474 5942 2) and of Verdi's Macbeth (sung in English, Chandos CHAN 3180(2)).

In January 2016, Moore performed for the newly revived New York City Opera in Puccini's Tosca at the Rose Theater in Lincoln Center.

In April 2016, she sang the lead role of Cio-Cio San in the San Diego Opera's performance of Puccini's Madama Butterfly, garnering critical recognition for her acting, her "rich, supple and multi-octave soprano voice" and vocal interpretation. During that production, she met and became friends with mezzo-soprano J'Nai Bridges, and the two reunited at San Diego Opera for a concert in 2023.

Moore appeared in 2018 with Opera Australia in the title role of Puccini's Tosca, delivering a critically acclaimed "complex performance" with a voice of "luxurious colour and brilliance at the top".

In 2019, Moore played the role of Serena in the Metropolitan Opera's Porgy and Bess. The production won Best Opera Recording at the 63rd Annual Grammy Awards. She also starred in the Met's Grammy-winning productions of Fire Shut Up in My Bones and Champion.

== Honors ==
Year	Award	Category	Notes	Ref
2000	Metropolitan Opera National Council Auditions			
2005	Maria Callas Debut Artist of the Year - Dallas Opera			
2021	63rd Annual Grammy Awards	Best Opera Recording	for the Metropolitan Opera's Porgy and Bess	
2023	65th Annual Grammy Awards	Best Opera Recording	for the Metropolitan Opera's Fire Shut Up in My Bones	
2024	66th Annual Grammy Awards	Best Opera Recording	for the Metropolitan Opera's Champion	

== Recordings ==
- Symphony No. 2 by Gustav Mahler, cond. Gilbert Kaplan, Wiener Musikverein 2003, (Deutsche Grammophon)
- Macbeth (Lady Macbeth) by Giuseppe Verdi sung in English, 2014, Studio (Chandos)
