= Anne Midgette =

American music critic (born 1965)

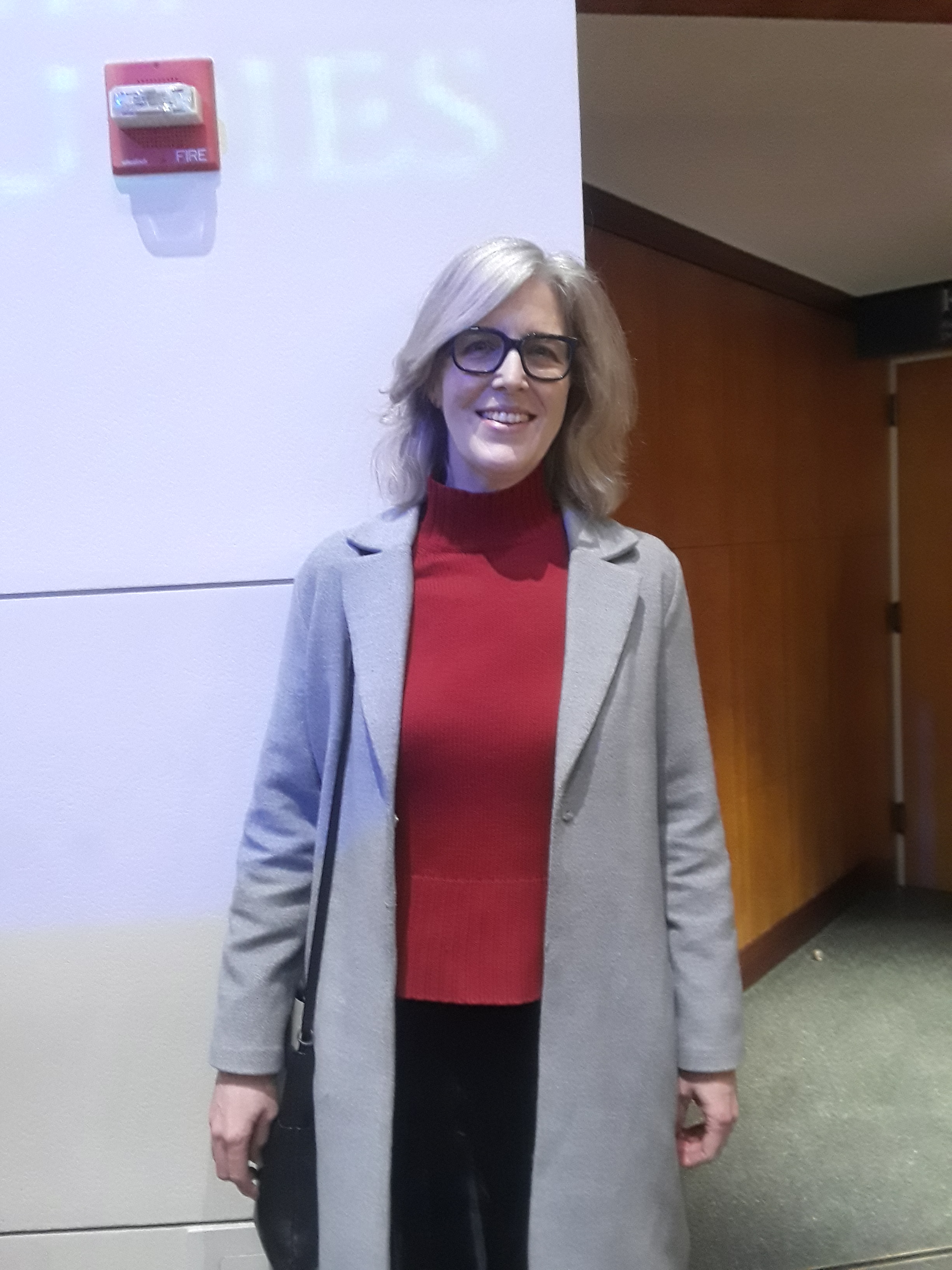
- Midgette attends a performance in February 2020
- Born: June 22, 1965 (age 61); Portland, Oregon, U.S.
- Education: Yale University (BA)
- Occupation: Music critic
- Notable credits: The Washington Post; The New York Times
- Spouse: Greg Sandow
- Father: Willard Midgette
- Website: annemidgette.com

Anne Midgette (born June 22, 1965) is an American music critic who was the first woman to write classical music criticism regularly for The New York Times. She was the chief classical music critic of The Washington Post from 2008 to 2019, prior to which she wrote for The New York Times from 2001 to 2007. A specialist in opera and composers of contemporary classical music, Midgette advocates the importance of online criticism and has previously maintained a classical music blog.

As a freelance writer she published in a wide variety of publications, sometimes covering other fields such as dance, theater, film and the visual arts. She is the co-author of two books, one with Herbert Breslin on his management of Luciano Pavarotti, and another with the pianist Leon Fleisher on his career.

== Life and career ==
Anne Midgette was born in Portland, Oregon on June 22, 1965. Midgette grew up in Brooklyn, later moving to Roswell, New Mexico in middle school. Her first live theater experience was the New York premiere of Leonard Bernstein's Mass in 1972. She studied Classical Civilization at Yale University, graduating with a Bachelor of Arts in 1986. After college, Midgette lived in Munich, Germany for nearly 12 years, during which she engaged in a variety of activities. This included traveling throughout Europe to review opera, music, dance, theater, film and the visual arts for The Wall Street Journal, Opera News and Opernwelt among other publications. She also did freelance writing for publications such as Deutsche Grammophon and BBC; edited a monthly music magazine; worked as a translator; and wrote travel guides, including one in 1993 on Bavaria for the Insight Pocket Guides series.

In 1998 she returned to the United States where she continued as a freelance writer for publications such ARTnews, Die Welt, Newsday, The Los Angeles Times, The Philadelphia Inquirer, Town & Country and the now-inactive website MusicMaker.com. In these publications, she reviewed artists from a variety of fields, such as Spike Lee, Marina Abramović, Plácido Domingo and Twyla Tharp. Midgette began to review classical music for The New York Times from 2001 until 2007, and thus became the first woman to write classical music criticism regularly for The New York Times. In addition to music, at The Times she occasionally reviewed theater; one of her articles was included in a book compilation of notable writings on music from 2006, Da Capo Best Music Writing 2006. In 2008 Midgette became chief classical music critic for The Washington Post, succeeding the music critic Tim Page. While at The Post, she covered a broad spectrum of classical music topics and sometimes the visual arts. Her focus spanned both "local and national issues", while she specialized in the coverage of opera and composers of contemporary classical music. She announced her retirement from The Post in November 2019. Midgette has been notably persistent in her advocation for social media as a means for music criticism. Throughout her tenure at The Post, Midgette maintained a classical music blog, The Classical Beat; she also posts music criticism on Facebook.

In addition to her contributions to periodicals, Midgette has co-authored two biographies. With Herbert Breslin, she wrote the book The King and I, about Breslin's 36 years managing the tenor Luciano Pavarotti, which was published in 2004. She subsequently collaborated with the pianist Leon Fleisher on a book about his life, My Nine Lives, published in 2010. Currently, she is working on a historical novel concerning Nannette Streicher, a woman who manufactured and built pianos for Ludwig van Beethoven. Other activities Midgette engaged in include lecturing or holding guest residencies at Bowling Green State University, Florida State University, the Juilliard School, and the NEA Institute for Classical Music Critics.

Her father was the painter Willard Midgette. Midgette is married to the music critic and composer Greg Sandow. They live together in Washington, D.C., with a country house in Warwick, New York.

== Selected writings ==
=== Books and chapters ===
- Midgette, Anne (1993). Bavaria. Insight Pocket Guides. Photography by Marton Radkai. Hong Kong: APA Publications. ISBN 978-962-421-576-2.
- Breslin, Herbert; Midgette, Anne (2004). The King and I: The Uncensored Tale of Luciano Pavarotti's Rise to Fame by His Manager, Friend and Sometime Adversary. New York: Crown Publishing Group. ISBN 978-0-7679-1508-3.
- Midgette, Anne (2006). "The End of The Great Big American Voice". In Gaitskill, Mary; Carr, Daphne (eds.). Da Capo Best Music Writing 2006: The Year's Finest Writing on Rock, Hip-Hop, Jazz, Pop, Country, & More. Cambridge: Da Capo Press. ISBN 978-0-306-81499-0.
- Fleisher, Leon; Midgette, Anne (2010). My Nine Lives. New York: Knopf Doubleday Publishing Group. ISBN 978-0-7679-3137-3.

=== Articles ===
- Midgette, Anne (September 3, 1997). "Aliens Abduct City's Identity". The Wall Street Journal.
- —— (November 17, 2002). "MUSIC; Lapses in Taste? To a Child, It Was Perfect". The New York Times.
- —— (November 13, 2005). "The End of the Great Big American Voice". The New York Times. Republished in Midgette 2005
- —— (November–December 2005). "Aural History". Yale Alumni Magazine.
- —— (February 24, 2007). "Modern Premiere Attended by Gershwin and Mozart". The New York Times.
- —— (December 9, 2007). "Growing Old Enough to Appreciate Youth". The New York Times.
- —— (February 24, 2013). "Wolfgang Sawallisch, Conductor, Dies at 89". The New York Times.
- ——; McGlone, Peggy (July 26, 2018). "Assaults in dressing rooms. Groping during lessons. Classical musicians reveal a profession rife with harassment". The Washington Post.
- —— (June 16, 2019). "Building diversity into the mandate: How NOI trains for 21st-century orchestras". The Washington Post.
- —— (October 9, 2019). "How do you get to Carnegie Hall and Met Opera museums? Practice isn't the problem". The Washington Post.
- —— (November 22, 2019). "It's my last review as The Post's classical music critic. Here are my parting thoughts on the NSO". The Washington Post.
- —— (December 10, 2019). "In classical music it was a year of building, deconstructing and, occasionally, rescuing". The Washington Post.
- —— (December 14, 2021). "When COVID stalled careers, these opera singers leveled up". NPR.
