= Greg Sandow =

American music critic and composer (born 1943)

- Born: June 3, 1943 (age 83)
- Education: Harvard University; Yale University
- Occupations: Music critic, composer
- Spouse: Anne Midgette

Greg Sandow (born June 3, 1943) is an American music critic and composer.

== Education ==
Sandow is a graduate of Harvard University, with a bachelor's degree in government. He is also a graduate of Yale University, with a master's degree in composition.

== Biography ==
For many years, Sandow was best known as a critic, both of classical music and pop. As a critic, Sandow wrote for The Village Voice in the 1980s. His column was on new classical music, though he also wrote about the mainstream repertory, typically challenging traditional assumptions about its function and its meaning. In recent years, his writing has appeared in the New York Times Book Review, Opera News, and the Wall Street Journal, where for a long time he was a regular contributor. In pop music, he became chief pop critic of the Los Angeles Herald-Examiner in 1988, and in 1990, joined the staff of Entertainment Weekly, which had just begun publication, and where he served first as music critic and then as senior music editor.

During his years as a critic, Sandow abandoned composition, but later resumed it. His works include four operas, one based on Frankenstein, music from which he incorporated into an orchestra piece, A Frankenstein Overture, which has been performed by the Pittsburgh Symphony and the South Dakota Symphony. Others who have performed his work include the Fine Arts Quartet, the St. Luke's Chamber Ensemble, and the pianist Jenny Lin.

Sandow has made public appearances throughout the United States and also abroad, and has also done consulting work and other special projects with classical music institutions, including the Cleveland Orchestra, the Pittsburgh Symphony Orchestra and the New York Philharmonic. Since 1997, he has taught at the Juilliard School as a member of the Graduate Studies Faculty, and from 2006 to 2009, also taught at the Eastman School of Music, where he gave the commencement address in 2008. He blogs about the future of classical music on the ArtsJournal.com website.

Sandow has also extensively written and researched unidentified flying objects, notably for the International UFO Reporter, a quarterly publication of the Center for UFO Studies.

Sandow is married to Anne Midgette, herself a former classical music reviewer for The New York Times and formerly chief classical music critic for The Washington Post. Sandow dedicated his "Quartet for Anne" to his wife. They live in Washington, D.C., and Warwick, New York. They have one child, Rafael Aron Sandow, born October 15, 2011.
