= Willard Midgette =

American painter

Willard Franklin Midgette (July 9, 1937 – April 21, 1978) was an American painter and printmaker associated with the second generation of Contemporary American Realist painters.

Midgette was born in Baltimore, Maryland, the son of Ernst Midgette and Mary Midgette. He was educated at Skowhegan School of Painting and Sculpture, Harvard College (B.A., 1959), Boston University College of Fine Arts, Pratt Institute (Pratt Graphic Art Center), and Indiana University Bloomington (M.F.A., 1962). Midgette was an associate professor of art at Reed College from 1963 to 1971. In the summer of 1969, he took a year's sabbatical and a year's leave to complete a mural commission and a fellowship in Roswell, New Mexico at The Roswell Artist-in-Residence Foundation. From 1971 to his death he was artist-in-residence and chairman of the art department of St. Ann's School in Brooklyn, New York. The summers of 1976 and 1977 he taught at the Skowhegan School of Painting and Sculpture, where he had attended summer school while in High School.

Midgette's mature style was characterized by life-size realist images of full figures, mostly clothed, in a space that could be seen as a continuation of the viewers' space. He was a great admirer of Annibale Carracci, and other trompe-l'œil 15th to 17th Century Italian painters. He spoke of creating an American Academy of Art, and made an engraving of a painting by Philip Pearlstein as an homage. He was represented by the Allan Frumkin Gallery (50 West 57th Street, New York City), which is now the George Adams Gallery (525 West 26th Street, New York City).

Midgette died of a brain tumor at the age of 40 in Brooklyn, New York on Friday evening, April 21, 1978. His daughter, Anne Midgette, is now a classical music critic.
