= Herbert Breslin =

American music industry executive

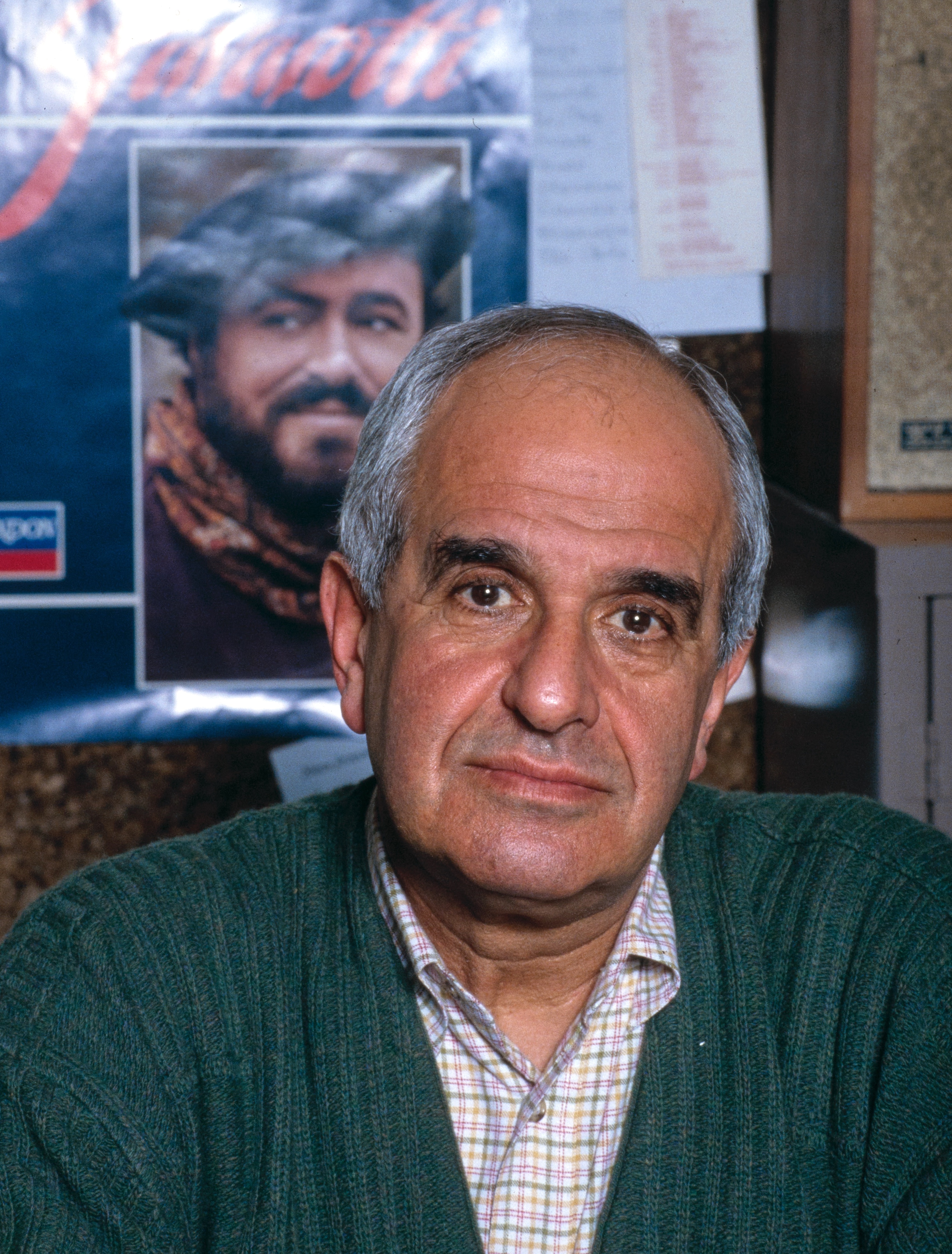
Breslin in 1986

Herbert Breslin (1 October 1924 – 17 May 2012) was an American music industry executive. He was influential in the careers of several musicians since the 1960s, the foremost of these being the tenor Luciano Pavarotti, with whom he started his career.

== Work ==
Breslin was born in the Brooklyn borough of New York City, New York. He served in the army during World War II. After the war, he attended City College of New York and after graduation, he became a high-school teacher and also began writing advertising copy for small businesses. After submitting samples of his writing to several large corporations, he accepted a position as a speechwriter for the Chrysler Corporation in Detroit, Michigan, where he became a member of the company's public-relations staff.

He began his career as a publicist and met Luciano Pavarotti, also a former teacher, when both men were only beginning their careers in 1967. Their collaboration resulted in both of them eventually becoming powerful and well known. Breslin's firm also represented Plácido Domingo, and at one time he represented both Pavarotti and Domingo as a publicist.

When Breslin decided to become an artist's manager, he presented the same strategy to both young tenors, who had made their Metropolitan Opera debuts during the same season. Using the career of the legendary tenor Enrico Caruso as a model, Breslin told Domingo and Pavarotti that like Caruso, each had to appear in concerts across the U.S. so that the public could see and hear them in person. Recordings and television appearances, Breslin cautioned, would not enable the American public to experience their singing personally.

Pavarotti readily agreed to Breslin's strategy, but Domingo preferred making recordings and appearing on television to performing on the concert platform. As a result, Breslin had to make a choice between the two and chose Pavarotti. At various times, the firm also represented Alicia de Larrocha, Dame Joan Sutherland, Marilyn Horne and many others.

In 2002 Pavarotti split with his manager of 36 years, and became associated with the Hungarian impresario Tibor Rudas, who produced the international "Three Tenors" concerts. The breakup was followed by the publication of a book by Breslin, along with arts critic Anne Midgette, entitled The King & I (Doubleday, 2004), which was seen by many as sensational and overly critical. The book criticized Pavarotti's acting (in opera), his inability to read music and having to learn roles by rote, and his personal conduct offstage. Breslin, however, always acknowledged Pavarotti's outstanding voice, magnificent career, and positive influence on his own career.

Herbert Breslin died on 17 May 2012 at age 87 in Theoule-Sur-Mer, France, and was survived by his wife, the former Carol Gluck, their daughter, Andrea Breslin-Jaffe, their son, Eric Breslin, and four grandchildren.
