= Insight Guides =

Travel company based in London

- Industry: Online travel agency
- Founded: 1970; 56 years ago
- Founder: Hans Johannes Hofer
- Headquarters: London, United Kingdom
- Area served: United States; Canada; United Kingdom; Australia
- Products: Tailor-made trips, travel guidebooks
- Parent: Apa Digital Group
- Website: www.insightguides.com

Insight Guides is a series of travel guide books. It is published by a London-based travel company that arranges tailor-made trips planned by local experts in destinations around the world. Founded in 1970 as a guidebook publisher, it later expanded into customised travel, planning personalised trips based on each traveller's request.

== History ==
Insight Guides was founded by Hans Johannes Hofer, whose first guidebook was published in 1970. It covered the island of Bali and was funded by a local hotel. The Insight Guides branding was first used in the 1980s, and the company went on to publish hundreds of titles covering destinations worldwide.

From 1991, the books were distributed by Houghton Mifflin in the United States of America, and in 1992 half the company was sold to Langenscheidt KG. In 2014 Insight Guides was sold to APA Publications.

In 1995, the company published smaller-size editions of guides to 18 European cities; these were branded as APA Insight Guides.

The series was redesigned in 1998.

Under APA, the company moved beyond print publishing and repositioned itself around tailor-made travel.

== Products ==
=== Tailor-made trips ===
Insight Guides offers tailor-made trips arranged through its website.

=== Travel guidebooks ===
Insight Guides publishes illustrated travel guidebooks that combine photography with magazine-style features written by local contributors.
