= The Rest Is Noise =

2007 nonfiction book by American music critic Alex Ross

The Rest is Noise: Listening to the Twentieth Century
- First edition (US)
- Author: Alex Ross
- Language: English
- Publisher: Farrar, Straus and Giroux, Picador, 4th Estate
- Publication date: October 2007
- Publication place: United States
- Media type: Print
- Awards: National Book Critics Circle Award (2007), Guardian First Book Award (2007), Premio Napoli (2010), Grand Prix des Muses
- ISBN: 978-0312427719
- LC Class: n2017003448
- Website: therestisnoise.com/what_is_this-2/

The Rest Is Noise: Listening to the Twentieth Century is a 2007 nonfiction book by the American music critic Alex Ross, first published by Farrar, Straus and Giroux. It recounts the history of European and American music, starting in 1900, and highlights many examples. According to Grove Music Online, the book was intended to "open musical discourse to the broader educated public".

It received widespread critical praise in the U.S. and Europe, garnering a National Book Critics Circle Award for Criticism, a Guardian First Book Award, a Premio Napoli, and the 2011 Grand Prix des Muses. The Rest is Noise was also on The New York Times list of the ten best books of 2007 and was a finalist for the Pulitzer Prize for General Nonfiction. The book was shortlisted for the 2008 Samuel Johnson Prize for nonfiction.
