= Hans Johannes Höfer =

German travel writer

Hans Johannes Höfer is a writer and artist born in Stuttgart, Germany. He wrote a travel guide to Bali and produced a series of travel guide books.

In the late 1960s, he trekked from Europe to Asia. In Bali, he earned a living by selling his paintings of the Indonesian island to tourists. The lack of easily available information on Bali's culture and people inspired him, with the financial backing of a local hotel, to publish the travel guide book Insight Guide: Bali in 1970.

He sold his share of the Insight Guides company to Langenscheidt KG and currently owns Apa Villa, Sri Lanka, one of the top-rated get-away hotels. He also owns an 80-foot schooner called Rising Tide. He is married to retired journalist and reporter Cynthia Hoefer and has two children.
