= Champion (opera) =

2013 opera by Terence Blanchard

- Opera by Terence Blanchard
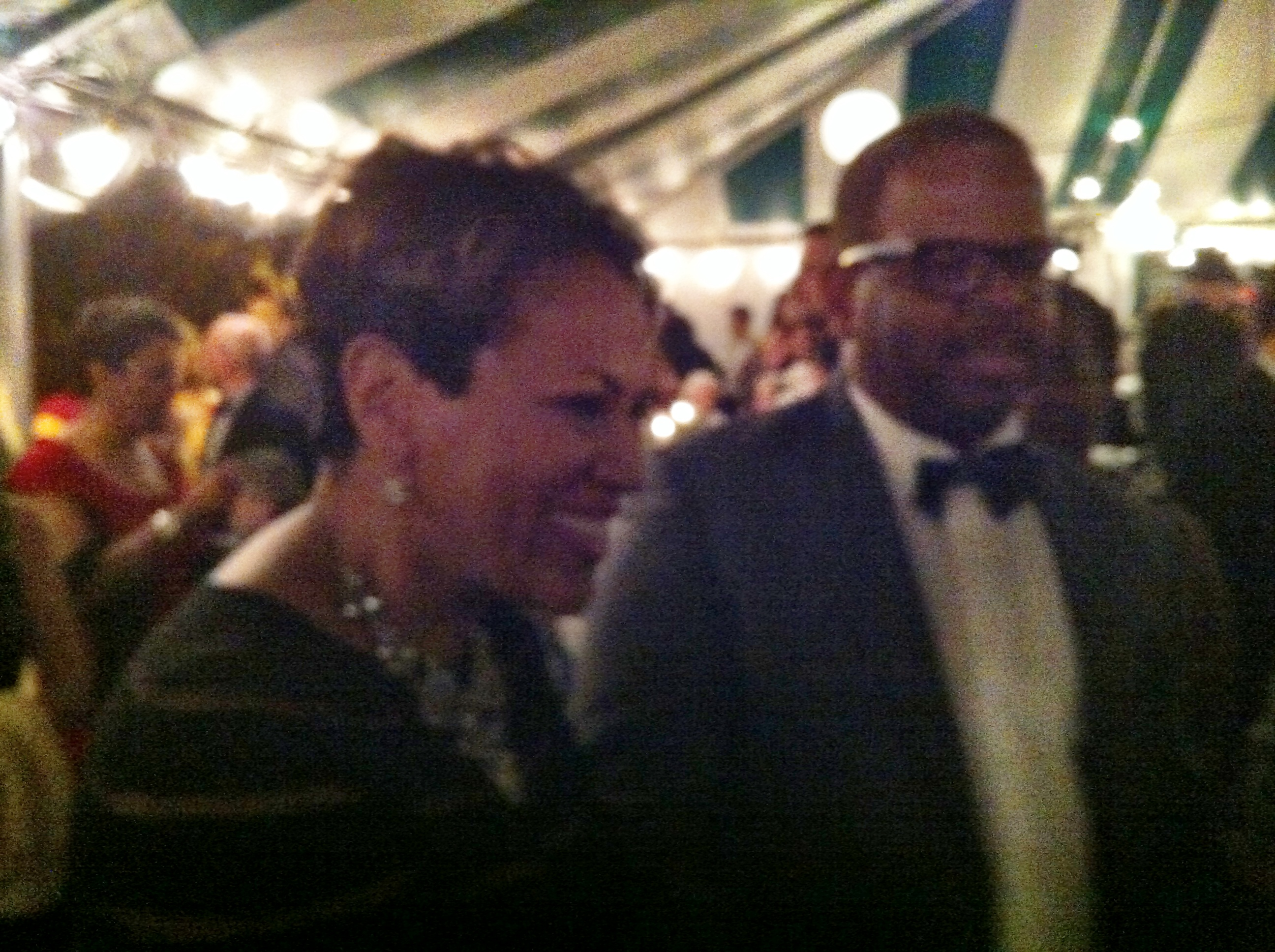
- The composer and his wife Robin Burgess at the premiere
- Librettist: Michael Cristofer
- Language: English
- Premiere: 15 June 2013; Loretto-Hilton Center for the Performing Arts, St. Louis

Champion is an opera in two acts and ten scenes with music by Terence Blanchard and a libretto by Michael Cristofer. Based on the life of African-American welterweight boxer Emile Griffith, this opera is a joint co-commission by Opera Theatre of Saint Louis (OTSL) and Jazz St. Louis.

== Background ==
Champion developed out of conversations between OTSL and Jazz St. Louis, and the companies' shared desire to collaborate on a commission that would combine opera and jazz. Blanchard himself described the work, his first opera, with the term "opera in jazz" rather than a "jazz opera". In 2011, the Whitaker Foundation of St. Louis provided the initial $200,000 leadership gift needed to fund the commissioning and development costs of the new work. In 2012, Opera Theatre received a $1M (USD) challenge grant from The Andrew W. Mellon Foundation, which would underwrite a substantial portion of the production costs of Champion, as well as Ricky Ian Gordon's opera 27 (premiered at OTSL in 2014) and a new production of Tobias Picker's Emmeline (presented in 2015). Additional support for Champion was provided by the Fred M. Saigh Endowment at Opera Theatre, the National Endowment for the Arts, OPERA America's Opera Fund, Emily Rauh Pulitzer, Phoebe Dent Weil, and The Aaron Copland Fund for Music.

== Performance history ==
It received its premiere at the Loretto-Hilton Center for the Performing Arts, Webster University, on 15 June 2013. The opera received its second production, with a revised orchestration by Blanchard, by Opera Parallèle in San Francisco, in collaboration with SFJAZZ, on February 21, 2016. The third production of the opera was on March 5, 2017 by Washington National Opera at the John F. Kennedy Center for the Performing Arts.

A 2020 production scheduled at Michigan Opera Theatre was cancelled due to COVID-19. Boston Lyric Opera presented their cancelled 2020 production in May 2022.

In December 2021, the Metropolitan Opera announced that they would stage Champion on 10 April 2023. Composer Blanchard and librettist Cristofer intended to make revisions for the production. The announcement came after the Metropolitan's successful production of Blanchard's second opera, Fire Shut Up in My Bones.

== Roles ==
Role	Voice type	Premiere cast, 15 June 2013 (Conductor: George Manahan)
Emile Griffith	bass	Arthur Woodley
Young Emile Griffith	bass-baritone	Aubrey Allicock
Emelda Griffith, Emile's mother	mezzo-soprano	Denyce Graves
Howie Albert, Emile's trainer	baritone	Robert Orth
Kathy Hagan, a bar owner	mezzo-soprano	Meredith Arwady
Benny 'Kid' Paret / Benny Paret Jr, a boxer / his son	tenor	Victor Ryan Robertson
Luis Rodrigo Griffith, Emile's adopted son and caretaker	tenor	Brian Arreola
Sadie Donastrog Griffith / Cousin Blanche	soprano	Chabrelle Williams
Little Emile (Emile as a young boy)	boy soprano	Jordan Jones
Ring Announcer	tenor	Christopher Hutchinson
Chorus of Reporters, photographers, hat makers, men at the boxing gym, Caribbean paraders, Drag queens

== Synopsis ==
Act I

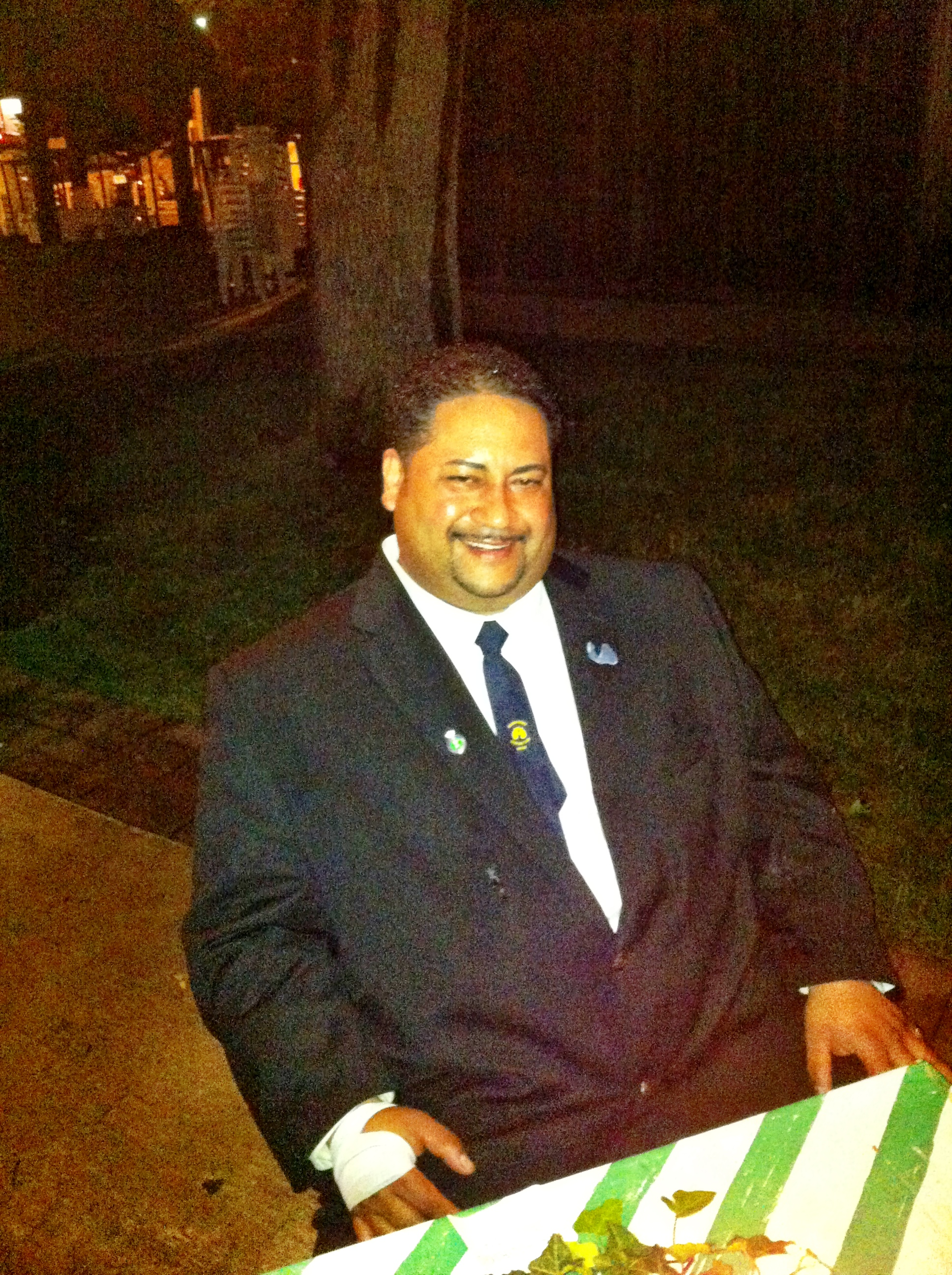
Luis Rodrigo Griffith at the after party of the world premiere of Champion on 15 June 2013

Scene 1 begins in Emile Griffith's apartment in Hempstead, Long Island, where he is struggling to dress himself. Suffering from dementia, he is confused and haunted by his past, which the opera presents in flashback. Luis, his adopted son and caretaker, reminds him to be ready for an important meeting with Benny Paret, Jr.

Late 1950s: Emile is a young man in St. Thomas, the US Virgin Islands. He wants to find his mother, Emelda, and make his fortune in America as a singer, a baseball player, and a hat designer. Emile moves to New York. When he finds his mother, she is confused, not sure which of her seven abandoned children he is, but overjoyed. Hoping to find work for Emile, she takes him to meet Howie Albert, a hat manufacturer. Howie sees an opportunity, in that Emile is physically like a boxer, not a hat-maker. Howie decides to train Emile for prizefighting. Giving up his other dreams, Emile quickly develops into a talented welterweight. Lonely and confused by his success, Emile finds his way to a gay bar in Manhattan, whose owner, Kathy Hagan, welcomes him to a frightening and also attractive world. Emile confides in Kathy, revealing some demons from his past. As a boy, his fundamentalist cousin Blanche forced him to hold cinderblocks above his head as punishment for 'having the devil inside him', which gave him his great physical strength.

1962: Emile meets Benny Paret at a weigh-in for their upcoming fight. Paret taunts Emile with the term 'maricón', a disparaging Spanish word for a homosexual. Alone with Howie, Emile tries to talk to him frankly about why this word hurts him so deeply, but for Howie this is something that no one in the fight business wants to talk about. Howie leaves him and Emile wonders what it means to be a man. Emile and Paret prepare for the big fight. Paret continues to taunt Emile, who ultimately delivers seventeen blows in less than seven seconds, which puts Paret into a coma.

Act II

Back in Emile's bedroom in the present, Emile is haunted by the ghost of Kid Paret who still questions his old opponent.

Mid- to late 1960s: Emile is enjoying a strong winning streak all over the world. Titles, trophies, and money roll in, but he remains disturbed by the death of Kid Paret. He tries living it up, and, denying his own identity, he takes a young bride, Sadie, although everyone, including his mother Emelda, who remembers her own childhood back in the Islands, warns him against it.

Early 1970s: After the wedding, Emile's luck has changed. He's now on a long losing streak of matches, and beginning to exhibit signs of "boxer's brain", or trauma-related dementia. Howie realizes that Emile's days are numbered and tries to console him. However, Emile rejects Howie, as well as his wife and his mother. Instead, he looks for comfort back at Kathy's bar. Outside in the street, a group of thugs taunt him and beat him violently, exacerbating his brain injuries.

Back in the present, Emile relives the nightmare of the attack. Luis tries to comfort him ("That was long ago"). In a New York City park, Emile asks for forgiveness from Benny Jr. Luis tells Benny that since that evening, Emile has struggled to find peace with what he's done and who he truly is. Back at home, the voices and memories subside.

== Critical reception ==
=== Premiere ===
At its premiere, Champion received generally favourable critical reviews, with respect to the production, direction, and performances of the cast. Several critics noted the coincidence of the production of Champion with then-current events in the USA related to violence against gay people, the attention given to basketball player Jason Collins (the first openly gay athlete with a major American sports team), and the ruling earlier in 2013 by the Supreme Court of the United States on the Defense of Marriage Act. Commentary on the music and libretto was more mixed, though on balance favourable:

"The music at times sounded thin and the dramatic pace sometimes flagged, but over all the score's cinematic flow aptly complemented the action on stage."

"First-time opera composers most often flounder at dramaturgy, and Champion is a bewildering shuffle of episodes... Only a couple of quasi-arias and gratuitous dances are identifiably jazzy. Blanchard's inexperience with vocal writing is evident in stilted word-setting, and accompaniments often have little evident connection to vocal lines. Vamp-in-place sometimes makes do as underlay for both singing and spoken dialogue."

"That makes this a durable piece of art. Remarkably impure as opera and as jazz, really, but unrelentingly true to itself, over-the-top when it needs to be and unapologetic, just like Verdi."

"Champion creates a complex picture of sexuality in a conservative era and a deeply homophobic sport. Although the opera's centerpiece, an aria for the title character called 'What Makes a Man a Man?', is a repetitive musical setting of bad music-theater doggerel, the cumulative effect of Griffith's sexual confusion, exploitation, and unwanted role-playing creates a powerful sense of disempowerment...

=== Second production ===
At the first performance of the second production, in San Francisco, criticisms were similar to the premiere, though again on balance positive:

"Blanchard has made a point of calling Champion an 'opera in jazz' rather than a 'jazz opera', and as best I can tell, the distinction speaks to his eagerness to use the entire panoply of jazz's musical resources to tell this tale. The score is varied and formally lithe, with each new scene seeming to take a different musical approach."

=== Washington National Opera production ===
The Washington National Opera production had comparable critiques of the work:

"Champion is a chain of individual numbers, some of them more predictable than others, and it could stand to be cut, particularly in Act II. But it represents something important and worthwhile, not only in including fresh perspectives but also in presenting, in [Arthur] Woodley's Emile, a character I loved and will remember—which is more than many new operas can boast."
