= Norman Lebrecht =

British music journalist (born 1948)

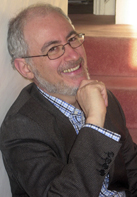
- Lebrecht in 2004
- Born: 11 July 1948 (age 78); London, England
- Education: Kol Torah Rabbinical College; Bar-Ilan University
- Occupations: Music journalist; author
- Website: normanlebrecht.com; slippedisc.com

Norman Lebrecht (born 11 July 1948) is a British music journalist best known as the owner of the classical music blog Slipped Disc. His writings have been accused of sensationalism and criticised for their inaccuracies and tendency to gossip, while others have praised them as entertaining. Unlike other writers on music, Lebrecht rarely reviews concerts or recordings, preferring to report on the people and organizations who engage in classical music. He was described by Gilbert Kaplan as "surely the most controversial and arguably the most influential journalist covering classical music".

Lebrecht was a columnist for The Daily Telegraph from 1994 to 2002, and assistant editor of the London Evening Standard from 2002 to 2009. On BBC Radio 3, Lebrecht presented lebrecht.live beginning in 2000, and The Lebrecht Interview from 2006 to 2016 and again from 2024 until 2026, when the BBC announced that it would no longer work with him after the pianist Yuja Wang publicly accused him of misogynistic bullying following an exchange over her withdrawal from a planned interview. He has written columns for the magazines Standpoint and The Critic.

In additions to writings on the classical music industry, Lebrecht has written 12 books on music and two novels The Song of Names (2001) and The Game of Opposites: A Novel (2009). The former won a 2002 Whitbread Award and was adapted into a film of the same name directed by François Girard. A work of social history, Genius and Anxiety: How Jews Changed the World, 1847–1947, was published in 2019.

== Early life and education ==
Norman Lebrecht was born on 11 July 1948 in London to Soloman and Marguerite Lebrecht. He attended Hasmonean Grammar School in London, citing Solomon Schonfeld as a childhood role model. From 1964 to 1965, Lebrecht attended Kol Torah Rabbinical College, a yeshiva school in Israel, and then Bar-Ilan University in Ramat Gan (1966–1968) and Hebrew University in Jerusalem.

In 1977 Lebrecht married the sculptor and writer Elbie Spivack; they have three daughters.

== Journalism ==
Following his graduation, from 1970 to 1972 Lebrecht worked at the Kol Yisrael news department, part of the Israel Broadcasting Authority. He returned to London in 1972, where he was a news executive at Visnews Ltd from 1973 to 1978.

Beginning in 1982, he was a special contributor to The Sunday Times until 1991.

In 1993 he became a music columnist for The Daily Telegraph in Britain, holding the post until 2002.

In 2002 he was an arts columnist and assistant editor of the Evening Standard, writing a weekly column until 2015. Gilbert Kaplan wrote that "From his perch in London he has covered and uncovered the classical music world in his full-page weekly column in the Evening Standard which through the internet is must-reading around the world ... concentrating on reporting on the organizations and the people managing – or as he often sees it, mismanaging – the classical music world as well as the stars who dominate this culture. All this with a sensibility normally associated with a political reporter or even a police reporter. He was the first to predict the demise of the major classical record companies – now documented in his recently released book The Life and Death of Classical Music."

Lebrecht wrote a monthly column for the culture magazine Standpoint, which ceased publication in 2021. Some months before its demise, Lebrecht transferred his monthly essay to a new magazine, The Critic.

== Books ==
The 1980s saw the publication of various books on music by Lebrecht: Discord: Conflict and the Making of Music (1982), The Book of Musical Anecdotes (1985), Mahler Remembered (1987), and A Musical Book of Days (1987). Following his leave from The Sunday Times, Lebrecht released The Maestro Myth: Great Conductors in Pursuit of Power (1991), which charts the history of conducting, from its rise as an independent profession in the 1870s to its subsequent and purposed preoccupations with power, wealth, and celebrity. The following year he released two books: Music in London (1992), as well as The Companion to 20th-Century Music (1992).

In 1996 he published When the Music Stops: Managers, Maestros and the Corporate Murder of Classical Music, a history of the classical music business, presenting an exposé of its backstage workings and predicting the collapse of the record industry. Herman Trotter of The Buffalo News wrote that Lebrecht's "widely discussed 1992 book "The Maestro Myth" seems to have been a warm-up for his current magnum opus." He also published Covent Garden: The Untold Story: Dispatches from the English Culture War, 1945–2000 (2000), covering the history of the Royal Opera House.

His career as a novelist began in 2002 with The Song of Names (2002), a tale of two boys growing up in wartime London and the impact of the Holocaust. It was published in 2001, and went on to win the 2002 Whitbread Award for First Novel. Lebrecht won the award at the age of 54. A feature film based on the 2002 novel, The Song of Names, was released in 2019. Directed by François Girard, it stars Tim Roth and Clive Owen.

His second book on Mahler, Why Mahler?: How One Man and Ten Symphonies Changed Our World was published in 2010. In 2014, Lebrecht received the Cremona Music Award from Mondomusica and Cremona Pianoforte in the Communication category, citing that book, and his other books and articles, and recognizing his "commitment ... to the diffusion of the music culture at a global level."

Another novel, The Game of Opposites: A Novel (Knopf Doubleday Publishing Group), was published in 2009 in the US.

Lebrecht published a work of social history titled Genius and Anxiety: How Jews Changed the World, 1847–1947 by Oneworld (UK) in October 2019 and by Simon & Schuster (USA) in December 2019. David Crane in The Spectator called it "Norman Lebrecht's urgent and moving history." Rebecca Abrams in the Financial Times described the book as "[i]mpressively wide-ranging in scope and unflaggingly fascinating in detail". Tanjil Rashid wrote in The Times: "Claims to have 'changed the world' tend to be exaggerations, but Lebrecht's subtitle, How Jews Changed the World 1847–1947, seems understated. The world wasn't changed, it was remade." Mark Glanville wrote in The Times Literary Supplement: "Lebrecht's book is an extended meditation on the question of what it is about Jews that has enabled them to change the world in so many different ways. He guides us through his chosen period (1847–1947) in a breathless present continuous, with an enthusiasm that holds the reader's attention. Besides major, familiar figures, such as Einstein, Freud, Marx, Proust and Schoenberg, his kaleidoscope of characters includes Rosalind Franklin, whose important work on the double helix has still not been fully recognized; Leo Szilard, who split the atom; and Albert Ballin, to whom Lebrecht attributes the invention of the hamburger."

Lebrecht's next book, in 2023, was Why Beethoven: A Phenomenon in 100 Pieces. The distinguished Beethoven biographer Jan Swafford called it 'a connoisseur's guide to Beethoven recordings'. BBC Music magazine designated it 'one heck of an enjoyable read.' The author Gina Dalfonzo wrote, 'At all times, though, his descriptions are unforgettable. I was startled, amused, sometimes delighted by such critiques as “Paul Badura-Skoda, recording on a Beethoven-era Erard, clunks about like bad plumbing”; or “The space between each note is separated like chess pieces on a world championship board”; or “A 1990 Brussels recording by the Russian exile Mischa Maisky with the Argentine wanderer Martha Argerich sounds like a morning-after hotel breakfast, desultory but deeply affectionate.” One moment he’s vulgar, the next moment he’s classy, but always, unfailingly, he’s interesting.'

=== Defamation case ===
His 2007 book Maestros, Masterpieces and Madness: The Secret Life and Shameful Death of the Classical Record Industry (US title: The Life and Death of Classical Music) was billed as an inside account of the rise and fall of recording, combined with a critical selection and analysis of 100 albums and 20 recording disasters. The book, however, was withdrawn from the market after its publisher discovered that it contained numerous libelous claims. In 2007 the founder of Naxos Records, Klaus Heymann, sued Lebrecht's publisher, Penguin Books, for defamation in London's High Court of Justice. Heymann claimed that Lebrecht had wrongly accused him of "serious business malpractices" in his book Maestros, Masterpieces and Madness, and identified at least 15 statements he claimed were inaccurate.

The case was settled out of court. As a result of the settlement, Penguin issued a statement acknowledging the baselessness of Lebrecht's accusations and apologising for "the hurt and damage which [Heymann] has suffered". The publisher also agreed to pay an undisclosed sum in legal fees to Heymann, to make a donation to charity, to refrain from repeating the disputed allegations and to seek the return of all unsold copies of Lebrecht's book. Commenting on the affair, Heymann said: "For me it's beyond belief how any journalist in five pages can make so many factual mistakes. It's shocking. Also, he [Lebrecht] really doesn't understand the record business." The settlement did not extend to the US edition of Lebrecht's book.

== Broadcasting ==
Beginning in 2000, he presented lebrecht.live (a cultural debate forum where "issues in the arts are debated and hotly disputed by makers and consumers of culture") on BBC Radio 3, whose output centres on classical music and opera.

From 2006 until 2016 he hosted The Lebrecht Interview ("Classical music critic Norman Lebrecht talks to major figures in the field"), also on BBC Radio 3. In July 2024, Lebrecht announced that The Lebrecht Interview was returning to BBC Radio 3 after a nine-year hiatus.

In February, 2026, it was announced that Radio 3 would no longer work with Lebrecht after the pianist Yuja Wang withdrew from an interview, publishing an email on her Instagram that she received in which Lebrecht stated in reference to the cancellation, "I am surprised and disappointed. I thought you were a serious person who stood by her commitments. I may have to revise that opinion." In her post she accused him of misogynistic bullying, which Lebrecht denied despite previous comments about her appearance as recently as earlier in February.

== Slipped Disc ==
Lebrecht launched a classical music blog, Slipped Disc, in March 2007, originally as part of ArtsJournal.com. It attracts over one million readers per month. In 2014, his blog became a standalone commercial website, supported by advertising and promotions. The blog primarily focuses on classical music industry gossip.

When asked by one interviewer whether he found such gossip interesting personally or whether he covered it for the sake of viewership, Lebrecht confirmed that the gossip

is the human comedy, that's what I like. I came into music because nobody was writing about it in a way that interested me. . . . What is important to someone who's just got out of bed, had a shower, got dressed, and is having their morning coffee? It's not Sibelius Four. It might be, "What happened to this conductor last night?"

== Critical reception ==
Lebrecht's polemical writings have drawn strong and diverse responses; Gilbert Kaplan described him in 2007 as "surely the most controversial and arguably the most influential journalist covering classical music." Robert Craft praised The Maestro Myth as an "exposé of the business practices of orchestral conducting [that] is likely to be the most widely read classical music book of the year". The American composer Gunther Schuller, in his 1998 book The Compleat Conductor, described The Maestro Myth in these terms: "A remarkably knowledgeable and courageous, no-holds-barred exposé of the serious degradation and venality in the conducting business, the wheeling and dealing of the power-broking managements that control most of the music business." Schuller went on to say: "It is sobering reading, to say the least, and is highly recommended to anyone concerned about the integrity of the art and profession of music." On the other hand, music critic Michael White described the book as merely "a compendium of gossip about who earns what and slept with whom to get it". Lebrecht himself was described by musicologist Richard Taruskin as "a sloppy but entertaining British muckraker".

Several journalists have noted multiple misstatements of fact by Lebrecht. John von Rhein, writing in the Chicago Tribune said that "Lebrecht writes entertainingly and has a wicked ear for backstage gossip" but "Too much of The Maestro Myth in fact betrays the sensibility of a tabloid columnist who cannot distinguish between tattle and truth – and worse, doesn't seem to care." Roger Dettmer, in The Baltimore Sun said that "The book [The Maestro Myth] is a syntactic miasma of received gossip, recycled anecdotes, rickety extrapolations and cultural penis-envy, with a gaffe-account in the hundreds." Martin Bernheimer, in the Los Angeles Times, writes that "One may want to forgive Lebrecht's passing errors, along with his hyperbole. Still, the little slips make one all the more leery of big gaffes".

Upon being awarded the 2015 Cremona Music Award, pianist Grigory Sokolov refused to accept the honour, making this statement on his website: "According to my ideas about elementary decency, it is shame to be in the same award-winners list with Lebrecht".

Music critic David Hurwitz published a satirical article titled, "Journalist Norman Lebrecht Dead at 61". After reporting Lebrecht's death from spontaneous combustion in the first paragraph, Hurwitz begins the second paragraph, "Truth be told, and in case you haven’t already guessed, Lebrecht is still with us as far as I know. That said, the above paragraph hardly contains more fiction than a typical Lebrecht article".

== Selected bibliography ==
- Lebrecht, Norman (1982). Discord: Conflict and The Making of Music. London: A. Deutsch.
- —— (1985). The Book of Musical Anecdotes. New York: Free Press. Also published as Hush! Handel's in a Passion: tales of Bach, Handel, and their contemporaries
- —— (1987). Mahler Remembered. London: Faber and Faber.
- —— (1987). A Musical Book of Days. London: HarperCollins.
- —— (1991). The Maestro Myth: Great Conductors in Pursuit of Power. London: Simon & Schuster.
- —— (1992). Music in London: A History and Handbook. London: Aurum Press.
- —— (1992). The Companion to 20th-Century Music. London: Simon & Schuster. ISBN 978-0-671-66654-5.
- —— (1996). When The Music Stops: Managers, Maestros and the Corporate Murder of Classical Music. London: Simon & Schuster. Also published as Who Killed Classical Music?: Maestros, Managers, and Corporate Politics
- —— (2000). Covent Garden: The Untold Story: Dispatches from the English Culture War, 1945–2000. London: Simon & Schuster.
- —— (2002). The Song of Names: A Novel. London: Headline Review.
- —— (2007). Maestros, Masterpieces and Madness: The Secret Life and Shameful Death of the Classical Record Industry. London: Allen Lane. Also published as The Life and Death of Classical Music: Featuring The 100 Best and 20 Worst Recordings Ever Made
- —— (2009). The Game of Opposites: A Novel. New York: Knopf Doubleday Publishing Group.
- —— (2010). Why Mahler?: How One Man and Ten Symphonies Changed Our World. London: Faber and Faber.
- —— (2019). Genius and Anxiety: How Jews Changed the World, 1847–1947. London: Oneworld Publications.
