= Alex Ross (music critic) =

American music critic (born 1968)

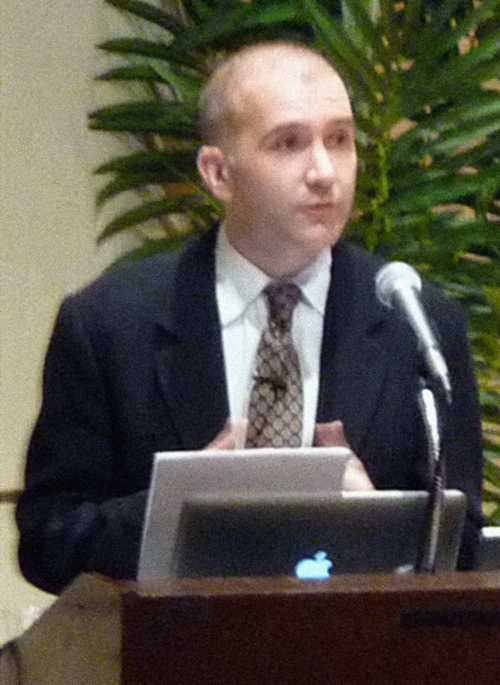
- Ross at the 2008 Chicago Humanities Festival
- Born: January 12, 1968 (age 58); Washington, D.C., U.S.
- Education: Harvard University (BA)
- Occupations: Music critic; author
- Known for: The Rest Is Noise (2007); Listen to This (2011); Wagnerism (2020)
- Notable credits: The New Yorker; The New York Times; See list
- Awards: MacArthur Fellowship; Belmont Prize; Full list
- Website: www.therestisnoise.com

Alex Ross (born January 12, 1968) is an American music critic and author who specializes in classical music. Ross has been a staff writer for The New Yorker since 1996. His writings include performance and record reviews, industry updates, cultural commentary, and historical narratives in the realm of classical music. He has written three books: The Rest Is Noise: Listening to the Twentieth Century (2007), Listen to This (2011), and Wagnerism: Art and Politics in the Shadow of Music (2020).

A graduate of Harvard University and student of composer Peter Lieberson, Ross was a critic for The New York Times from 1992 to 1996. He has received wide acclaim for his publications; The Rest Is Noise was a finalist for the 2008 Pulitzer Prize for General Nonfiction, and his other awards and honors include a MacArthur Fellowship and the Belmont Prize. He maintains a popular classical music blog, The Rest is Noise. In July 2026, Ross announced that he was stepping away from the New Yorker music column but would remain at the magazine, writing about a broad range of topics.

== Life and career ==
Alex Ross was born on January 12, 1968, in Washington, D.C. He attended the Potomac School in McLean, Virginia and St. Albans School in Washington, graduating in 1986. (Note: Ross names various teachers at St. Albans School as particularly impactful on his education: Paul Piazza, Paul Barrett, Ted Eagles, Sandy Larson, Don Brown, Vaughn Keith, and Jack McCune.) He was a 1990 graduate of Harvard University, where he studied under composer Peter Lieberson and was a DJ on the classical and underground rock departments of the college radio station WHRB. During his time at Harvard, he began music criticism, writing reviews for Fanfare, a classical music magazine.

From 1992 to 1996, Ross was a music critic at The New York Times. He also wrote for The New Republic, Slate, the London Review of Books, Lingua Franca, Fanfare and Feed. He first contributed to The New Yorker in 1993 and became a staff writer in 1996, succeeding Paul Griffiths. As of 2021, Ross and Justin Davidson at New York are the only classical music critics who write regularly for a general-interest American magazine.

The music critic Edward Rothstein has said that Ross tries "to restore critical vigour by loosening the boundaries isolating the classical tradition from the world of politics and popular culture". Ross maintains a popular classical music blog, The Rest is Noise, which the musicologist Lars Helgert called "among the most highly regarded web resources for classical music criticism".

Ross's first book, The Rest Is Noise: Listening to the Twentieth Century, a cultural history of music since 1900, was released in the U.S. in 2007 by Farrar, Straus and Giroux and in the U.K. in 2008. The book received widespread critical praise in the U.S., garnering a National Book Critics Circle Award, a spot on The New York Times's list of the ten best books of 2007, and a finalist citation for the Pulitzer Prize in general nonfiction. It was also shortlisted for the 2008 Samuel Johnson Prize for nonfiction. Ross's second book, Listen to This, was released in the U.S. in September 2010 by Farrar, Straus and Giroux and was published in the U.K. in November 2010. In September 2020, his third book, Wagnerism, was released.

Ross married director Jonathan Lisecki in Canada in 2006. He is now based in New York City, living in Chelsea, Manhattan.

== Selected bibliography ==
- The Rest Is Noise: Listening to the Twentieth Century. New York: Farrar, Straus and Giroux. 2007. ISBN 978-0374249397.
- Listen to This. New York: Farrar, Straus and Giroux. 2010. ISBN 978-0374187743.
- Wagnerism: Art and Politics in the Shadow of Music. New York: Farrar, Straus and Giroux. 2020. ISBN 978-0374285937.

== Awards and honors ==
Ross has received a MacArthur Fellowship (2008), three ASCAP Deems Taylor Awards for music writing, and a Holtzbrinck fellowship at the American Academy in Berlin. In 2012, he received the Belmont Prize for Contemporary Music at the pèlerinages Art Festival in Weimar. In 2016, he was awarded the Champion of New Music award by the American Composers Forum.

Preceded by Paul Griffiths	Music Critic of The New Yorker; 1996–	Succeeded by incumbent
