= James Jorden =

American journalist (1954–2023)

- Born: James Glenn Jorden; August 6, 1954; Opelousas, Louisiana, U.S.
- Died: October 2, 2023 (aged 69); Sunnyside, Queens, New York, U.S.
- Education: Louisiana State University
- Occupations: Blogger; journalist; editor
- Writing career
- Subjects: Opera

James Glenn Jorden (August 6, 1954 – October 2, 2023) was an American blogger, journalist and music critic who wrote about opera. He was known for founding and editing the zine Parterre Box.

== Background ==
James Glenn Jorden was born on August 6, 1954, in Opelousas, Louisiana, and developed an interest in opera from an early age. He attended Louisiana State University.

== Career ==
Some time after graduating college, Jorden moved to New York and sought work in the theater, including acting, directing, and teaching. In 1993, he founded Parterre Box, a zine which covers the topic of opera from a queer perspective; in 1996, he began publishing it online. Jorden's work with parterre box also includes a podcast, Unnatural Acts of Opera. Parterre Box and Jorden have been featured in numerous media publications, including Opera News magazine, The Advocate, and The New York Times. He also worked for a time as a web producer for Fox News. Until 2013, he was employed full-time as a legal secretary.

After 10 years as a reviewer for Gay City News, Jorden became opera critic for the New York Post in March 2009, succeeding Clive Barnes. In the fall of 2014, Jorden left the Post to write about opera for The New York Observer. He also served as a commentator on the WQXR program Operavore.

== Death ==
Jorden died at his home in Sunnyside, Queens, at the age of 69.
