= Parterre Box =

Online opera magazine

'Parterre Box'
- Issue #22 of Parterre Box
- Managing Editor: Harry Rose
- Frequency: Daily online. Bimonthly 1993–2001 in print.
- Publisher: Nick Scholl
- Founder: James Jorden
- Founded: 1993
- Company: Grand Tears (2025–present)
- Based in: New York City
- Language: English
- Website: parterre.com

Parterre Box (often stylized as parterre box) is an online magazine devoted to opera, which cultivates an attitude that may be deemed to be campy, critical and opinionated with explicitly gay overtones.

The publication was founded by the New Yorker James Jorden in 1993 during a period of under-employment as an opera director. It appeared bi-monthly from 1993 to 2001 in print form. It is now solely published on the Web, where it is considered an influential opera blog.

In May 2005, Jorden introduced the first regular opera podcast entitled Unnatural Acts of Opera. For this show, Jorden took on the drag persona of "La Cieca", a gossip commentator. La Cieca introduced a single act of what she called "demented" opera, concentrating on live vocal performances from around 1950 to the time the acts started.

A highlight of the 2006 season of Unnatural Acts of Opera was the first ever podcast of Richard Wagner's four-opera cycle Der Ring des Nibelungen, an event Jorden termed "Götterdämmerung". Jorden has also contributed a number of opera video clips to YouTube, concentrating on his favorite divas, including Renata Scotto, Leonie Rysanek and Dame Gwyneth Jones.

The podcasts appear to have ended in 2009 and are known to be available via various services, including iTunes and in streaming form on the parterre.com website.

From 2009 to 2013, Jorden contributed opera reviews to the New York Post.
