= Oxford History of Western Music =

Published narrative history

- Author: Richard Taruskin
- Language: English
- Genre: Music history
- Publisher: Oxford University Press
- Publication date: 2005
- ISBN: 978-0-19-516979-9

The Oxford History of Western Music is a narrative history from the "earliest notations" (taken to be around the eighth century) to the late twentieth century. It was written by the American musicologist Richard Taruskin. Published by Oxford University Press in 2005, it is a six-volume work on the various significant periods of Western music and their characteristic qualities, events and composition styles. A paperback edition in five volumes followed in 2009. Oxford University Press had previously published narrative histories of music, although Taruskin's was the first sole author work, spanning over 4000 pages.

== Volumes ==
There are six volumes in the original hardback edition.

1. The Earliest Notations to the Sixteenth Century
2. The Seventeenth and Eighteenth Centuries
3. The Nineteenth Century
4. The Early Twentieth Century
5. The Late Twentieth Century
6. Resources: Chronology, Bibliography, Master Index

The set won the 2005 R. R. Hawkins Award (Association of American Publishers) for Best Scholarly Work. The first volume was particularly well received. It has been described as weaving "facts and impressions from histories, visual art and architecture" as an introduction to early music.

The updated five volume paperback set (without a separate volume for the indexes and bibliography) came out in 2009. It was this version - with 1.25 million words, 500 images, and 1,800 musical examples - that was used for the online edition (2010). A one-volume printed College Edition co-authored by Christopher H Gibbs followed in 2012. A second edition of this version was issued in 2018. Richard Taruskin died in July 2022.

== Reviews ==
"Taruskin's Oxford History of Western Music is monstrous. Few of the adjectives that define the term—extraordinary, amazing, prodigious, marvelous—seem out of place when trying to talk about it."

"In conclusion, Oxford History of Western Music stands as a remarkable achievement both as a history of music and a critique of the field of music history."

"Taruskin's account is plausible and well argued."

== Predecessors ==
=== Oxford History of Music ===
The Oxford History of Music was first published in six volumes under the general editorship of Sir Henry Hadow between 1901 and 1905. The first two, written by H. E. Woolridge (who had been appointed Slade Professor of Fine Art at Oxford in 1895), were entitled The Polyphonic Period and began with the music of ancient Greece. These volumes dated quite quickly. The third, on seventeenth century music, was written by Sir Hubert Parry. J. A. Fuller Maitland wrote volume four on the age of Bach and Handel, Hadow himself wrote the fifth (The Viennese Period) and Edward Dannreuther covered the Romantic period in the sixth. From the late 1920s other volumes were reprinted as they stood, but Sir Percy Buck, who was also involved with the OUP's Tudor Church Music, revised the first two volumes (1929 and 1932), and edited a new introductory volume of general essays (1929), including a contribution on musical notation from Sylvia Townsend Warner. In 1940 H C Colles added a seventh volume, Symphony and Drama, 1850–1900.

=== New Oxford History of Music ===
The New Oxford History of Music, initially produced under the general editorship of Sir Jack Westrup, began to appear in 1954 and was finally completed (with Volume IX) in 1990. It spanned ten volumes.

1. Ancient and Oriental Music (ed. Egon Wellesz, 1957)
2. Early Medieval Music up to 1300 (ed. Anselm Hughes, 1954) (second edition Richard Crocker, 1990)
3. Ars Nova and the Renaissance (1300–1540) (ed. Gerald Abraham, Anselm Hughes, 1960)
4. The Age of Humanism (1540–1630) (ed. Gerald Abraham, 1968)
5. Opera and Church Music (1630–1750) (ed. Anthony Lewis, Nigel Fortune, 1975)
6. Concert Music (1630–1750) (ed. Gerald Abraham, 1986)
7. The Age of Enlightenment (1745–1790) (ed. Egon Wellesz, 1973)
8. The Age of Beethoven (1790–1830) (ed. Gerald Abraham, 1982)
9. Romanticism (1830–1890) (ed. Gerald Abraham, 1990)
10. The Modern Age (1890–1960) (ed. Martin Cooper, 1974)
