= Dannreuther =

Dannreuther is a surname. Notable people with the surname include:

- Edward Dannreuther (1844–1905), British pianist of Alsatian descent
- Gustav Dannreuther (1853–1923), American violinist of Alsatian descent, brother of Edward
- Hubert Edward Dannreuther (1880–1977), British admiral, son of Edward
