= H. C. Colles =

English music critic and organist (1879–1943)

Henry Cope Colles (20 April 1879 – 4 March 1943) was an English music critic, music lexicographer, writer on music and organist. He is best known for his 32 years as chief music critic of The Times (1911–1943) and for editing the 3rd and 4th editions of Grove's Dictionary of Music and Musicians (1927 and 1940 respectively).

== Biography ==
Henry Colles (known informally as "Harry") was born in Bridgnorth, Shropshire, in 1879, the son and grandson of doctors both called Abraham Colles (the senior Abraham Colles is remembered as the discoverer of the eponymous Colles' fracture). His family was of Irish origin, originally from Kilkenny. They settled in Somerset, although the junior Abraham Colles practised in Bridgnorth.

Harry Colles entered the Royal College of Music (RCM) aged 16 and studied music history under Hubert Parry, the organ under Walter Alcock, and counterpoint under Walford Davies. He and Davies cemented a lifelong friendship, and Colles later wrote Davies's biography. He spent three years at the RCM and then, on Sir Walter Parratt's advice, applied for and won the organ scholarship at Worcester College, Oxford, graduating in 1902.

In 1908, he designed the organ for Emmanuel Church, West Hampstead, in consultation with Walford Davies who gave the first performance. Colles replaced the inaugural organist Martin Shaw, and was himself replaced by Harold Darke.

The Dean of Worcester College, William Henry Hadow, had strongly supported Colles to use his gifts with the written word in the field of music criticism. He became assistant music critic of The Times, under J. A. Fuller Maitland, and in 1911 succeeded him as chief critic. He occupied that role for more than half his life; he was 31 when appointed, and remained in this position until his death 32 years later in 1943, at the age of 63. During that time he appointed Frank Howes, Dyneley Hussey and A. H. Fox Strangways as his assistants, Howes eventually succeeding him. His writing was marked by its "comprehensive taste, sure and fair judgment, and ... unfailing tact and humanity that tempered even his severest strictures".

During World War I, Colles attained the rank of captain in the Royal Artillery and served in Macedonia, where he trained the Greek artillery in the use of British guns. For this service he was awarded a medal by the Greek government.

His arrangement of Henry Purcell's Hornpipe in E minor, ZT 685, was performed at the BBC Proms in 1915 and 1916.

On Sir Hugh Allen's invitation, he lectured on music history, analysis and interpretation at the RCM. He also taught at Cheltenham Ladies' College. In 1923 he spent some time in the United States as guest music critic for The New York Times.

In 1927, he produced the 3rd edition of Grove's Dictionary of Music and Musicians, which was an extensive revision of the 2nd edition produced by Fuller Maitland between 1904 and 1910. In 1940 he put out the 4th edition, a corrected reprint of the 3rd edition along with a supplementary volume. He personally wrote about one-twentieth of the millions of words in Grove III and IV. According to one obituarist, his assistant critic A. H. Fox Strangways, Colles's task was "to put in some sort of showing, on people and things that 'ought to find a place there', apart from any intrinsic interest they might or might not awaken; he was, in fact, a general tidier-up of half-remembered persons and topics".

In 1932 Colles was appointed D.Mus. honoris causa by the University of Oxford. In 1934 he was appointed Honorary Freeman of the Worshipful Company of Musicians. In 1936 he became an Honorary Fellow of Worcester College, Oxford.

Colles was deeply religious and took a special interest in the Three Choirs Festival. He made an abridged edition of Handel's Messiah for the festival. He was a Fellow and Governor of St. Michael's College, Tenbury, Chairman of the Church Music Society and Chairman of the School of English Church Music.

Colles was an examiner for the Associated Board of the Royal Schools of Music, visiting Australia and New Zealand in that capacity in 1939.

In early 1943, he was instrumental in arranging for the release from internment on the Isle of Man of the composer Egon Wellesz, to enable him to take up a fellowship of Lincoln College, Oxford.

Henry Cope Colles died in London on 4 March 1943, aged 63. When the library of the School of English Church Music was re-opened after the war in 1946, it was renamed the Colles Library in his memory.

== Other writings ==
His writings apart from those mentioned above included:

- Brahms (London, 1908)
- The Growth of Music (Oxford, 1912–1916)
- Voice and Verse: a Study of English Song (London, 1928)
- The Chamber Music of Brahms (London, 1933)
- The Royal College of Music: a Jubilee Record, 1883–1933 (London, 1933)
- Colles, H. C. (1934). Buck, Percy (ed.). Symphony and Drama, 1850–1900. Oxford History of Music. Vol. 7. Oxford: Oxford University Press. OCLC 877735.
- On Learning Music and Other Essays (London, 1940)
- H. Walford Davies (London, 1942)
- History of St Michael's College, Tenbury (with M. F. Alderson; London, 1943).
