= Joseph Bennett (critic) =

English music critic and librettist

Bennett in 1910

Joseph Bennett (29 November 1831 – 12 June 1911) was an English music critic and librettist. After an early career as a schoolmaster and organist, he was engaged as a music critic by The Sunday Times in 1865. Within five years he was appointed chief music critic of The Daily Telegraph, a post he held from 1870 to 1906.

Among Bennett's other work was writing or adapting libretti for cantatas and other large-scale orchestral and choral works by British composers such as Arthur Sullivan, Frederic Cowen and Alexander Mackenzie.

== Life and career ==
=== Early years ===
Bennett was born in Berkeley, Gloucestershire. He attended the local church, and became a member of its choir, and joined a local musical society in whose orchestra he played the viola. When he reached the age of 18, his friends encouraged him to become a minister in the Congregational church, but after long consideration he decided that he could not accept all the doctrines of the church. He embarked instead on a career as a teacher, and studied for a year at a training college in London in 1853.

After spending the following year in Margate, where he taught at the local school and played the organ in the Baptist church, Bennett was invited to take charge of a school in Islington, north London. He remained there for three years, before moving in 1857 to the Weigh House Chapel in the City of London as precentor and schoolmaster. He soon resigned the precentorship, while retaining his teaching duties, to allow himself time to work as an organist at Westminster Chapel.

=== Journalism ===
In addition to his work as a teacher and organist, Bennett conducted two choral societies in the London area. In 1865, one of the members of the choir he conducted at Blackheath recommended him to Henry Coleman, music critic of The Sunday Times, who was in need of a deputy. The position was at first unpaid, but he was soon taken on to the editorial staff of the paper, and within five years was also writing for six other publications including The Daily Telegraph and The Musical Standard. In 1870, J W Levy, proprietor of The Daily Telegraph, invited Bennett to join the staff of the paper as chief music critic. It was agreed that Bennett would not write for any rival newspapers, but he was free to contribute to strictly musical journals. He remained with the paper until 1906. In a speech at a banquet marking Bennett's retirement, the composer Sir Alexander Mackenzie said:

During his long and valuable services as a member of the staff of the Daily Telegraph – a period of no less than thirty-six years – Mr. Bennett, except, perhaps, acting as a war correspondent, has dealt with every conceivable subject (besides music), including Parliamentary reports. I believe he holds the record for attendance at Musical Festivals, for he has, shall I say, "survived" over one hundred of them. He has been, among other things, one of the most sympathetic of – as the journalistic phrase runs – undertakers. One almost envies those who have been fortunate enough to have had their funerals described by him. There are the touching and graphic records of the Irish Famine in 1880–81 to point to. And to come to more recent times, do we not remember that splendidly-descriptive series of articles on "Palestine" when he visited the East in 1899? They are still fresh in my memory.

Parry (back l.), Mackenzie (front c.) and Stanford (front r.) in 1910, with Edward German (back r.) and Dan Godfrey

Bennett was inadvertently responsible for naming a long-lived movement in British music, known as the "English Musical Renaissance". In 1882, in a review of Hubert Parry's First Symphony, he wrote that the work gave "capital proof that English music has arrived at a renaissance period." Bennett developed the theme in 1884, singling out for praise Frederic Cowen's Third Symphony (the Scandinavian) and operas by Arthur Goring Thomas (Esmeralda), Charles Villiers Stanford (Savonarola) and Mackenzie (Columba). This idea of an English musical renaissance was taken up with zeal by the music critic of The Times, J A Fuller Maitland. Bennett was not a member of the inner circle of the supposed renaissance; although he was a friend and collaborator of one of its leading composers, Mackenzie, he was equally a friend and collaborator of Arthur Sullivan, of whom the renaissance circle disapproved because of Sullivan's popular appeal. (Note: Sullivan had sought Bennett's occasional advice since the mid-1870s, and the two became close friends. After the success of The Golden Legend, the friendship became less close, probably, according to Bennett, because he did not conceal his disappointment that Sullivan persisted in writing comic opera and indulging in "West-End life", instead of concentrating on serious music.)

An article published in 1946 suggested that Bennett's high profile position at The Daily Telegraph (then claimed to have the largest circulation in the world) held back the development of English music because of his antipathy to Wagner, leaving Bernard Shaw (with an equally perverse antipathy to Brahms) as "the only modern critic" in the late eighties and early nineties.

=== Librettist and musicologist ===
As well as his journalistic work, Bennett was highly regarded for the analytical notes he wrote for the programmes of the Philharmonic Society and other concerts. From these, he progressed to supplying libretti for cantatas and other large-scale choral works. Among the composers with whom he collaborated on one or two works were C. Lee Williams, Herbert Brewer and Frederick Bridge. With Cowen, Bennett collaborated on five large-scale works, and with Mackenzie on six, including the composer's best-known oratorio, The Rose of Sharon. He contributed the libretto to Villiers Stanford's opera, The Canterbury Pilgrims, "laboriously compiled from Chaucer", which premiered in 1884. Bennett's last libretto was for Sullivan's 1886 cantata The Golden Legend, based on the 1851 poem of the same name by Longfellow.

Between 1877 and 1891, Bennett contributed to The Musical Times a series entitled, "The great composers sketched by themselves", dealing with the life and works of more than 30 composers. The music publisher Novello & Co reprinted five of these articles, those on Berlioz, Chopin, Rossini, Cherubini and Meyerbeer, as separate volumes. After his retirement, Bennett published a book of memoirs, Forty Years of Music.

Bennett retired to Purton in Gloucestershire, not far from his birthplace. He died there at the age of 79.

== Notes and references ==
Notes

== Sources ==
- Bennett, Joseph (1908). Forty Years of Music – 1865–1905. London: Methuen. OCLC 890645.
- Eatock, Colin (2010). "The Crystal Palace Concerts: Canon Formation and the English Musical Renaissance". 19th-Century Music. 34 (1). University of California: 87–105. doi:10.1525/ncm.2010.34.1.087. ISSN 0148-2076.
