= Kathleen Schlesinger =

British music archaeologist and musicologist (1862–1953)

Kathleen Schlesinger (1862, in Holywood, Ireland – 1953, in London) was a British music archaeologist and musicologist.

== Life and career ==
Born in Ireland but then brought up largely in Geneva, Schlesinger moved to London in 1875 or 76 and lived there for the rest of her life. In 1896 she began publishing articles in London musical journals. She specialized in the structure, capabilities and especially history of musical instruments, as eventually shown in her two-volumed work The Instruments of the Modern Orchestra and Early Records of the Precursors of the Violin Family, brought out in 1910. She was responsible for "practically all of the articles" about musical instruments in the Encyclopædia Britannica of 1911, being soon called "the greatest authority on the subject". In 1913 she gave lectures at the British Museum and in 1914 in the University of London.

After discovering in August 1914 the key to understanding of the ancient Greek scales, Schlesinger was appointed in December to a Fellowship in the Archaeology of Music at the University of Liverpool. At her request in 1915 H. Kent made for her a facsimile copy of a cithara depicted on a Greek vase painting of about 500 B.C. in the British Museum. Schlesinger's playing on this instrument during her series of lectures on "The Ancient Modes of Greece" given in 1916 at a Theosophical Holiday School in Cornwall made a deep impression on "forgotten Australian modernist" composer Elsie Hamilton, who was working with just intonation. They began a close collaboration, and their first joint performances took place in London in 1917, with Schlesinger playing solos on her cithara and new works by Hamilton being performed on the piano and other instruments. On further occasions in 1918 such performances were repeated in London and in 1919 in both London and Paris.

The most significant connection made by Schlesinger and Hamilton was with Rudolf Steiner, whom they first met at Dornach in 1921, and subsequently on his three visits to England in 1922. Schlesinger published in Anthroposophy articles on "The Language of Music" and "The Return of the Planetary Modes", and during the Anthroposophical Summer School at Penmaenmawr in 1923 gave an important lecture on "The Planetary Harmonies". A further performance with Hamilton took place in London towards the end of that year, and evidently during the next Summer School at Torquay in 1924 or shortly afterwards in London Rudolf Steiner asked Schlesinger to move over to Dornach and become active for music at the Goetheanum, an invitation which through his illness and death in 1925 could no longer be put into effect. Together with Hamilton, however, she did come over to perform at the Musical Conference in Dornach in 1926.

Many years later in 1939, her Greek Aulos presented her analysis of the modes used on aulos instruments in ancient Greek music.

== Selected writings ==
- Kathleen Schlesinger, The Instruments of the Modern Orchestra and Early Records of the Precursors of the Violin Family, with over 500 illustrations and plates, London: W. Reeves, 1910.
- Schlesinger, Kathleen (1929). "The Significance of Musical Instruments in the Evolution of Music". In Buck, Percy (ed.). Introductory Volume. Oxford History of Music. Oxford: Oxford University Press. pp. 85–116. OCLC 633571.
- --, The Greek Aulos: A Study of Its Mechanism and of Its Relation to the Modal System of Ancient Greek Music, Followed by a Survey of the Greek Harmoniai in Survival Or Rebirth in Folk-music, Methuen, 1939.
