= Oxford History of Music =

Classical music history series (1901–1934)

- Editor: Henry Hadow
- Language: English
- Genre: Music history
- Publisher: Oxford University Press
- Publication date: 1901–1934
- OCLC: 78974124
- Followed by: New Oxford History of Music

The Oxford History of Music (OHM) is an early 20th-century multivolume narrative history of Western classical music. The OHM was first published by Oxford University Press in seven numbered volumes, alongside an introductory volume, between 1901 and 1934 under the editorship of William Henry Hadow, and later Percy Buck. Spanning the polyphony of early medieval music to early 20th-century classical music, the OHM was among the most admired and largest histories of classical music at the time of its publication.

An updated series, the New Oxford History of Music, was released between 1957 and 1990. Musicologist Richard Taruskin published the newest iteration in 2005 as its sole author, the Oxford History of Western Music.

== History ==
Hadow, c. 1900, the organizer and intital edtor for the OHM

Up until the 20th-century, single-author narrative histories on music were common place, including those by Charles Burney, François-Joseph Fétis, Ernst Ludwig Gerber, Hans Joachim Moser, Hugo Riemann, Jean-Jacques Rousseau, Percy Scholes and Johann Gottfried Walther. Grove Music Online remarks that by the 20th century, "The amount of information now available for inclusion in a music encyclopedia probably discourage[d] heroic, single-handed compilations". The Oxford History of Music (OHM) was the first major collaborative attempt on the history of music in English. Its chief focus was on European classical music, and by beginning with the polyphony of medieval music, it was, according to Bruno Nettl, "perhaps making a unique statement defining what music truly is". In particular, it aimed to be a continuous narrative history, rather than a series of distinct textbooks.

The OHM was edited and organized by musicologist and composer William Henry Hadow, described as "now little remembered but then a prominent Oxford figure". Hadow was known for music education reforms, and two further influential efforts, his Oxford music lectures and Studies in Modern Music. His approach to music, admired by Frank Howes, favored "technically informed and culturally sensitive treatment", and found its way into the OHM.

The first OHM volumes were a two-part survey (1901, 1905) on medieval music by Harry Ellis Wooldridge. Although the introductory volume (written much later, in 1929) includes a survey of ancient Greek music, commentators like Nettl and Egon Wellesz consider the series proper as essentially beginning with medieval polyphony. Three volumes followed in close succession: seventeenth-century music, written by Hubert Parry (1902); the Age of Bach and Handel (late Baroque music) by J. A. Fuller Maitland (1902); and The Viennese Period (see the First Viennese School) by Hadow himself (1904). The sixth volume on Romantic music was written by Edward Dannreuther, who soon died after the initial manuscript was finished in the Fall of 1904. It was revised by Hadow and Fuller Maitland for publication in 1905.

From the late 1920s, other volumes were reprinted as they stood, but Sir Percy Buck revised the first two volumes (1929 and 1932), and edited a new introductory volume of general essays (1929). The introductory volume included contributions from a variety of scholars:

- Cecil Torr on ancient Greek music
- W. O. E. Oesterley on Hebrew music
- Sylvia Townsend Warner on the history of musical notation
- Kathleen Schlesinger on the history of musical instruments
- Anselm Hughes on medieval music theorists
- Walter Frere on plainchant
- A. H. Fox Strangways on folksong
- Edward Joseph Dent on the societal components of medieval music
- Michel-Dimitri Calvocoressi, who contributed a bibliography

In 1940 H. C. Colles added a seventh volume, Symphony and Drama, 1850–1900.

The OHM was followed by The New Oxford History of Music (1957–1990; NOHM) initially edited by Jack Westrup. Rather than attempt a set of third edition publications, the NOHM contributor Egon Wellesz remarked that "Revision of an historical work is always difficult [...] Such radical revision was not the purpose of the second edition of the Oxford History of Music. To have attempted it in a third edition would have been impossible." The newest iteration was solely authored by Richard Taruskin in 2005, the Oxford History of Western Music (OHWM).

== Reception ==
In its time, the OHM was widely regarded by the classical music community, particularly the first two volumes. The music critic Louis Charles Elson remarked in 1912 that the Oxford History of Music was already "the largest [general music survey] in modern history". However, by the end of the 1920s Sir Percy Buck considered the first two volumes dated. His efforts to renew the series were not without criticism. Music critic Richard Aldrich criticized the 1929 introductory volume for chapter topics which were "not any of them very exciting subjects". Although he lauded the "contemporaneous human interest" of Dent's contribution, and the "lucid and intelligible" explanations by Warner.

== Contents ==
- Buck, Percy, ed. (1929). Introductory Volume. Oxford History of Music. Oxford: Oxford University Press. OCLC 633571.
- Wooldridge, Harry Ellis (1901). Hadow, William Henry (ed.). The Polyphonic Period: Part 1: Method of Musical Art, 330-1330. Oxford History of Music. Vol. 1. Oxford: Oxford University Press. OCLC 271064153.
  - Wooldridge, Harry Ellis; Buck, Percy (1932). Buck, Percy (ed.). The Polyphonic Period: Part 1: Method of Musical Art, 330-1330. Oxford History of Music. Vol. 1 (2nd ed.). Oxford: Oxford University Press. OCLC 643481831.
- Wooldridge, Harry Ellis (1905). Hadow, William Henry (ed.). The Polyphonic Period: Part 2: Method of Musical Art, 1300–1600. Oxford History of Music. Vol. 2. Oxford: Oxford University Press. OCLC 42765074.
  - Wooldridge, Harry Ellis; Buck, Percy (1932). Buck, Percy (ed.). The Polyphonic Period: Part 2: Method of Musical Art, 1300–1600. Oxford History of Music. Vol. 2 (2nd ed.). Oxford: Oxford University Press. OCLC 643481838.
- Parry, Hubert (1902). Hadow, William Henry (ed.). The Music of the Seventeenth Century. Oxford History of Music. Vol. 3. Oxford: Oxford University Press. OCLC 1210318.
  - Parry, Hubert; Dent, Edward Joseph (1938). The Music of the Seventeenth Century. Oxford History of Music. Vol. 3 (2nd ed.). Oxford: Oxford University Press. OCLC 1125124.
- Fuller Maitland, J. A. (1902). Hadow, William Henry (ed.). The Age of Bach and Handel. Oxford History of Music. Vol. 4. Oxford: Oxford University Press.
- Hadow, William Henry (1904). Hadow, William Henry (ed.). The Viennese Period. Oxford History of Music. Vol. 5. Oxford: Oxford University Press.
- Dannreuther, Edward (1905). Hadow, William Henry (ed.). The Romantic Period. Oxford History of Music. Vol. 6. Oxford: Oxford University Press. OCLC 1210347.
- Colles, H. C. (1934). Buck, Percy (ed.). Symphony and Drama, 1850–1900. Oxford History of Music. Vol. 7. Oxford: Oxford University Press. OCLC 877735.
