= Gustav Dannreuther =

American violinist and conductor

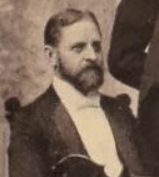
- Dannreuther in the 1890s
- Born: July 21, 1853; Cincinnati, Ohio, USA
- Died: December 19, 1923 (aged 70); New York City, New York, USA
- Other name: Gustave Dannreuther
- Occupation: Musician
- Years active: 1873—1923
- Relatives: Edward Dannreuther (brother); Hubert Dannreuther (nephew)

Gustav Dannreuther (July 21, 1853 – December 19, 1923) was an American violinist, instructor, chamber musician, and conductor. Dannreuther may best be remembered by connoisseurs of chamber music, particularly those of Boston and New York City, for his numerous string quartet concerts (three per season in New York City, accompanied by distinguished artists) and an associated appreciation of string quartet music.

== Biography ==
=== Early life ===
Dannreuther was born on July 21, 1853, to Abraham and Sophie (née Fischbacker) Dannreuther. He had an older brother, pianist Edward Dannreuther (1844–1905), and an older sister, Julia (c. 1850–1991). Abraham, who was descended from Bavarians from Bayreuth, Germany, built cabinets and pianos. In 1846, Abraham, Sophie, and Edward moved from Strasbourg to Cincinnati into a German community. By 1861, Abraham's business went under and he died not long after, leaving his wife and three children in poverty.

=== Music career ===
Between 1871 and 1873, Dannreuther studied violin under Heinrich de Ahna and Joseph Joachim and theory under Heitel at the Berlin University of the Arts in Germany. After leaving school, he spent a few months in Paris before moving to London, where his brother Edward lived. He stayed there for 4 years before returning to the United States and settling in Boston. He was among the violinists in the debut concert of the Boston Symphony Orchestra at the Symphony Hall in 1881. Not long after, he moved to Buffalo, New York, and became the conductor of the Buffalo Philharmonic Society. While there, he met pianist Ellen "Nellie" Morton Taylor, a Buffalo native, at concerts in which they both performed. They married on July 13, 1882, at St. Peter's Episcopal Church in Niagara Falls, New York.

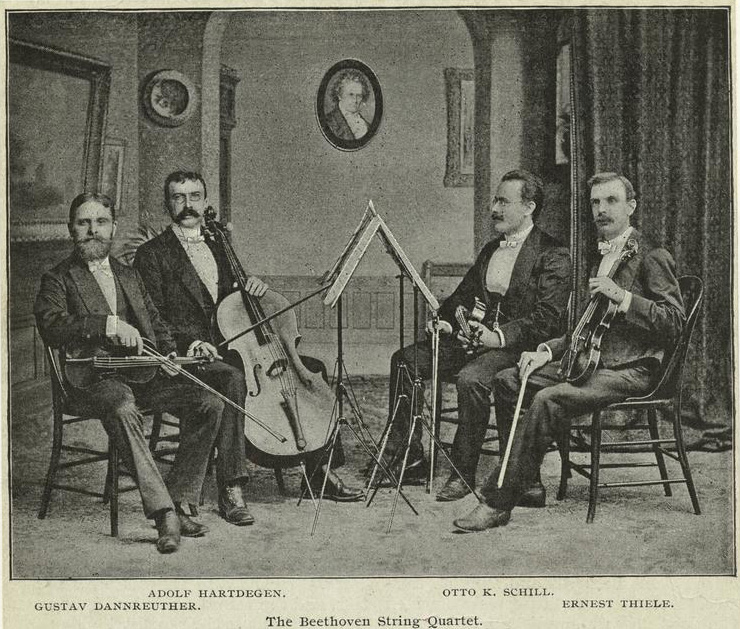
1891 Beethoven String Quartet

In 1883, Dannreuther formed the Beethoven Club with Carl Meisel (violin), Wulf Fries (cello), and C.N. Allen (viola). The following year, he and Nellie moved to New York City part time and he formed the Beethoven String Quartet, inspired by Boston's Mendelssohn Quintette Club. The initial makeup was Dannreuther (violin), Ernst Thiele (2nd violin), Otto K. Schill (viola), and Adolf Hartdegen (cello). By 1886, the Dannreuthers lived fully in New York and in the subsequent years, the group was renamed the Dannreuther Quartet. In its first 20 years, the members changed only three times: in 1892, Emil Schenck replaced Hartdegen (cello); in 1895, Joseph Kovarik replaced Thiele (2nd violin); and in 1902, F. Lorenz Smith replaced Kovarik (2nd violin) when Kovarik replaced Schill (viola). At its 20th anniversary, the Quartet was said to be the "oldest and the only 'permanent' quartet, not only in New York City, but in this country." In its 21st year, Henry Hess replaced Smith (2nd violin). Between 1895 and 1910 alone, they performed 14 times at Carnegie Hall and officially disbanded in 1917.

Dannreuther joined Vassar College's faculty in 1906 and taught violin there until his death. He conducted the school's orchestra between 1908 and 1914. Over the course of his career, he was also part of the Mendelssohn Quintette Club in Boston; served as concert master of the New York Philharmonic and of the Oratorio Society of New York under Walter Damrosch. He was in some way connected to the Kneisel Quartet for several years as well. Very early in his career, he wrote Chord and Scale Studies for Young Players and in 1898 provided music for Henry Lane Eno's wedding to Edith Labouisse.

Dannreuther died of pneumonia in his New York City home on December 19, 1923. He left his "library of chamber music" to Vassar.

=== Family and Descendants ===
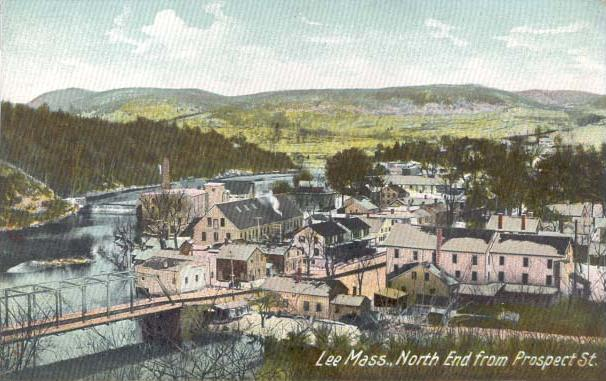
Lee, MA in 1907

Dannreuther and Nellie owned a home in Lanesborough, Massachusetts, where they spent their summers. The North Adams Transcript reported that Gustav was repeatedly woken by a cowbell but was refused when he asked the owner if it was possible to put quieter bells on the cattle. It is said that the owner put bigger, louder bells on the cows instead. Not long after, the couple stumbled upon the nearby town of Lee, where they eventually settled, though it is unknown if the incident with their neighbor in Lanesborough influenced the decision to move. They purchased a 12-acre estate and farm on West Park Street with a view of the October Mountain State Forest. Dannreuther became an avid hiker and had climbed Mount Greylock 17 times by 1909, potentially making him eligible to join the Appalachian Mountain Club. Nellie eventually settled in Lee full-time and commuted to the city for her weekly classes, while Gustav stayed primarily in the city and visited Lee when he could.

Nellie (1858–1942) was a musician and pianist in her own right, often accompanying the Dannreuther Quartet, and briefly an instructor at Wells College in Ithaca. Her father Martin Taylor was a bookseller. Gustav and Nellie had three children: Dr. Walter Taylor (1885–1960), Martin Taylor (1889–1973), and Gustav Jr. (1891–?). Walter was a gynecological doctor and surgeon and married Anna R. Tower in 1911. Anna died in 1966 in their Park Avenue apartment, two blocks from Central Park. Martin married Alice Evans in Des Moines, Iowa, in 1917. Gustav Jr.'s wife Lena "Betty" Armstrong, a descendant of John Armstrong, died in 1938.

Nellie and Gustav had two granddaughters: Martin's daughter Susan (c. 1921–2020), a music teacher; and Gustav Jr.'s daughter Helen Louise. Louise had one son, Edward "Ned" Livingston Coster III. Dannreuther had four nephews (John Scheibly, and Hubert Edward, Tristan, and Wolfram Dannreuther) and four nieces (Julia Thonnsen, Adele Gier, and Elsie Shriefer, and Isolde Dannreuther).
