= Peterloo (overture) =

1968 concert overture by Malcolm Arnold

Peterloo, Op. 97, is a concert overture by Malcolm Arnold written in 1968 to commemorate the centenary of the first meeting of the Trades Union Congress. It is a programme piece which depicts the Peterloo Massacre of 1819. It was given a mixed reception by critics, but has nevertheless become one of Arnold's best-known works, being arranged several times for wind or brass band, recorded many times, and played twice at the Proms, once in its original form and once in a choral arrangement to words by Sir Tim Rice.

== Programme ==
The overture depicts the events of 16 August 1819 in St Peter's Fields, Manchester, where a peaceful outdoor meeting called to debate the subject of political reform was interrupted by the Yeomanry, a cavalry force which had been sent in by local magistrates. Attempting to arrest the speaker, Henry "Orator" Hunt, they charged the crowd, causing a panic which resulted, according to Arnold, in the death of eleven people and injuries to 400 more. Arnold wrote that "This Overture attempts to portray these happenings musically, but after a lament for the killed and injured, it ends in triumph, in the firm belief that all those who have suffered and died in the cause of unity amongst mankind, will not have died so in vain". He also noted that he "tried to draw a parallel with the riots I see happening today".

== Structure ==
The overture has a tripartite structure. The first part begins with a nobile theme in C major scored for unison strings harmonized by trombones, tuba, harp and basses. It then moves to a second theme for woodwind and harp before reprising the first one. A jarring percussion rhythm makes itself heard over this nobile theme, and ushers in the work's second part, which comprises a struggle between various short and violent themes in which brass and percussion figure prominently. The time signature becomes 6/8 (a conventional way of representing galloping cavalry) and rises to fortissimo until a single tam-tam stroke introduces a short lament. The third part of the overture reprises first the woodwind theme of the first part and then the whole of the first part, ending in a triumphal mood.

== Premiere ==
Peterloo was commissioned from Arnold by the Trades Union Congress to commemorate the 100th anniversary of its first meeting. It was first performed by the Royal Philharmonic Orchestra, conducted by the composer, in the Royal Festival Hall, London, on 7 June 1968.

== Reception ==
Early reviews of the score were mixed. Stephen Banfield judged that "it lacks any recognizable coherence that could focus and purge the emotions in the depiction of tragedy. It might have been serviceable as film music, but I see no future for the piece in the concert hall." Peter J. Pirie, conceding that "the music certainly makes up in fervour what it lacks in depth", called it "a romantic overture as good as most and better than some very popular examples of the kind".

Reviews of recordings have been similarly varied. One critic wrote that the overture's rhetoric does not quite come off, but that "the feeling of approaching menace at the opening is unforgettable". Malcolm MacDonald considered, as Banfield had, that it might have worked better as film music, but it has also been called "a highly effective encore" and "first-rate programme music".

Hugo Cole, in a book-length study of his music, noted that Arnold had intended it for a non-specialist audience, and wrote that "the message is forcefully put over in terms even the tone-deaf could hardly mistake". He acknowledged that "there is considerable skill in the way in which the forces of evil are stage-managed, and in which episode succeeds episode so that the impetus is never lost", but he thought that the lack of interaction between good and evil in the work meant that "the return of the nobile theme comes as something of an anticlimax – it has been nowhere, experienced nothing, since we first met it, and there seems no good musical reason why it should sail home in G major triumph". Paul R. W. Jackson, in 2003, identified the major influences on the first and last sections as Elgar and Walton, and on the "chilling and terrifying" central section, with its "cluster chords on the brass vividly portray[ing] the screams of the crowd, the whinnying of the horses and the chaos", as Shostakovich and Ives.

== Arrangements ==
There have been at least four arrangements for wind band, by Charles Sayre, Hisaatsu Kondo, Munetoshi Senoo, and Terry Vosbein; also one for brass band by Andrew Duncan. An arrangement for chorus and orchestra by Ben Parry setting words by Sir Tim Rice was first performed in 2014 at the Royal Albert Hall, London, as part of the Last Night of the Proms.

== Recordings ==
Original orchestral version

- BBC Symphony Orchestra, cond. Malcolm Arnold. Sir Malcolm Arnold – The Composer, The Conductor – A 75th Birthday Tribute. BBC Radio Classics. 15656 91817.
- City of Birmingham Symphony Orchestra, cond. Malcolm Arnold. Malcolm Arnold – Symphony No. 5, Peterloo Overture, Cornish Dances. HMV. ASD 2878.
- BBC Philharmonic Orchestra, cond. Rumon Gamba. Malcolm Arnold Overtures. Chandos. CHAN 10293.
- BBC Concert Orchestra, cond. Vernon Handley. The BBC Concert Orchestra, Vernon Handley – Malcolm Arnold. Conifer Classics. 75605 51298 2.

Charles Sayre arrangement for wind band

- University Of Wisconsin Milwaukee Wind Ensemble, cond. Thomas Dvorak. Classics For Wind Ensemble/Symphony Band Volume One.
- University of Evansville Wind Ensemble, cond. Kenneth Steinsultz. Hail to Evansville. Mark Records. 54594 MCD.

Hisaatsu Kondo arrangement for wind band

- Hamamatsu Symphonic Wind Orchestra, cond. Toru Asada. WASBE Concerts, 1995 (The 7th WASBE Conference, Hamamatsu, Japan). Kosei. KOCD-4551/60.
- Tokyo Kosei Wind Orchestra, cond. Douglas Bostock. An Arnold Celebration. Kosei. KOCD 8000.
- Kansai Wind Orchestra, cond. Toshiyuki Ise. Blessed Promising Future. Brain Music. BOCD 7175.
- JSB Band, cond. Ken-Ichiro Masumori. Japan Band Festival 93. Sony. SRCR 9421.

Munetoshi Senoo arrangement for wind band

- Bunkyo University Wind Orchestra, cond. Munetoshi Senoo. Bunkyo Sound Selection. Brain Music. OSBR 20026/27.

Unknown arrangements for wind band

- Texas A&M University Symphonic Band, cond. Timothy Rhea. Wind Band Masterworks. Vol. 2. Mark Records. 5982 MCD.
- Harmonie St. Caecilia Geulle. Caecilia in Concert. Eurosound. ES 47.182.
- University of Illinois Symphonic Band, cond. James F. Keene. In Concert With The University Of Illinois Symphonic Band Recording #127. Mark Records. MCD 1458.

Terry Vosbein arrangement for wind ensemble

- United States Air Force Tactical Air Command Band, cond. Lowell E. Graham. The United States Air Force Tactical Air Command Band, Virginia Air Force Base, Va., In Concert. Mark Records. MCC 558.

Andrew Duncan arrangement for brass band

- Williams Fairey Band, cond. James Gourlay. Bridgewater Hall Live 2000. Egon. ESP 001.
- Whitburn Band. Victory. WBC. WBC001.

Unknown arrangement for brass band

- Leyland Band, cond. Michael Fowles. The Alchymist's Journal. Faber Music. 0 571 52287 4.

== Footnotes ==
=== References ===
- [Anonymous] (August 2015). "Malcolm Arnold Discography" (PDF). The Malcolm Arnold Society.
- Banfield, Stephen (July 1982). "Review of Peterloo Overture". Music & Letters. 63 (3–4): 374–375. doi:10.1093/ml/63.3-4.374.
- Cole, Hugo (1989). Malcolm Arnold: An Introduction to His Music. London: Faber. ISBN 9780571100712.
- Greenfield, Edward; Layton, Robert; March, Ivan (1988). The New Penguin Guide to Compact Discs and Cassettes. London: Penguin. ISBN 0140468293.
- Holman, Gavin (January 2021). "Vintage Brass Band Recordings – Compact Discs". ibew.
- Jackson, Paul R. W. (2019) [2003]. The Life and Music of Sir Malcolm Arnold: The Brilliant and the Dark. Abingdon: Routledge. ISBN 9780367174613.
- Landon, Raymond S. (21 February 2018). "USAF Heritage of America Band, Langley Air Force Base, Virginia Discography 1985–2017" (PDF). Air Force Bands.
