= William Ripper =

British mechanical engineer and academic

William Ripper, CH (1853–1937) was a British educationalist. He was principal of Sheffield Technical School when it merged with other institutions to create the University of Sheffield, and he was acting vice-chancellor of the university from 1917 to 1919.

He started as a dockyard apprentice, was later a science teacher in the Central Higher School of Sheffield, publishing a book on chemistry. However, his main technical work was as a mechanical engineer. He published two notable books on steam and steam engines which went through several editions. Steam was later, in 1909, expanded to cover the recently developed steam turbines and internal combustion engines, being then re-titled as Heat Engines

He was therefore appointed to teach mechanical engineering at Sheffield Technical School, becoming professor in 1889 and then principal. The Technical School became the Department of Applied Science in the new University in 1905, with Ripper as head. During the First World War the then Vice-Chancellor Herbert Fisher was called away to a government post, and Ripper took on the role until 1919. He managed this in addition to his position of professor of mechanical engineering, and also coordinator of the university war effort, which included extensive training for industry and allocation of work to local firms for efficient production, as well as research and direct technical support.

Ripper was also instrumental in setting up local ‘trades technical societies’ to promote good technical practice and worker education, sometimes using the university’s laboratories.

Ripper retired from the university in 1923 and died in 1937.

== Published works ==
- Practical Chemistry. London: Wm Isbister. 1883.
- Steam. Longmans, Green. 1889.
- A Course of Instruction in Machine Drawing and Design for Technical Schools and Engineer Students. Percival & Company. 1890.
- Steam-engine theory and practice. Longmans, Green & Co. 1912.
- A Continuous Mean-pressure Indicator for Steam-engines. Institution of Mechanical Engineers. 1899.
- Heat engines. Longmans, Green. 1950 [1909]. with Alfred Kersey

Academic offices
Preceded by Herbert Fisher	Acting Vice-Chancellor of the University of Sheffield; 1917–1919	Succeeded by William Henry Hadow
