= English Musical Renaissance =

Hubert Parry (back l.), Alexander Mackenzie (front c.) and Charles Villiers Stanford (front r.) in 1910 with Edward German (back r.) and Dan Godfrey (front l.

The English Musical Renaissance was a hypothetical development in the late 19th and early 20th century, when British composers, often those lecturing or trained at the Royal College of Music, were said to have freed themselves from foreign musical influences, to have begun writing in a distinctively national idiom, and to have equalled the achievement of composers in mainland Europe. The idea gained considerable currency at the time, with support from prominent music critics, but from the latter part of the 20th century has been less widely propounded.

Among the composers championed by proponents of the theory were Hubert Parry, Charles Villiers Stanford and Alexander Mackenzie. Writers who propounded the theory included Francis Hueffer and J A Fuller Maitland, while it received further promotion from the critics Frank Howes and Peter J. Pirie.

== Conception ==
The term originated in an article by the critic Joseph Bennett in 1882. In his review in The Daily Telegraph of Hubert Parry's First Symphony he wrote that the work gave "capital proof that English music has arrived at a renaissance period." Bennett developed the theme in 1884, singling out for praise a now forgotten symphony by Frederic Cowen (the Scandinavian Symphony) and equally forgotten operas by Arthur Goring Thomas (Esmeralda), Charles Villiers Stanford (Savonarola) and Alexander Mackenzie (Columba).

Joseph Bennett (top) and J A Fuller Maitland

The idea of an English musical renaissance was taken up by the music critic of The Times, Francis Hueffer, and his successor J A Fuller Maitland. The latter became the most assiduous proponent of the theory. His 1902 book English Music in the XIXth Century (Note: Fuller Maitland used the term "English" to include the Irish Stanford and the Scottish Mackenzie and all other non-English British composers.) is subdivided into two parts: "Book I: Before the Renaissance (1801–1850)", and "Book II: The Renaissance (1851–1900)". Fuller Maitland's thesis was that although "it would be absurd to claim a place beside Beethoven or Schubert" for earlier British composers such as Macfarren and Sterndale Bennett, it was not absurd to do so for his favourite British composers of the late 19th century. The Royal College of Music, the centre of the renaissance theory, was founded explicitly "to enable us to rival the Germans".

Fuller Maitland regarded Stanford and Parry as the pre-eminent composers of the renaissance. Both were upper-middle-class Oxbridge graduates, like Fuller Maitland, and both were professors at music colleges. The writer Meirion Hughes describes Fuller Maitland's world as one of insiders and outsiders. Fuller Maitland rejected British composers who did not conform to his template, notably Sullivan, Elgar and Delius. Hughes wrote: "Sullivan's frequent forays into what was viewed as the questionable realm of operetta removed him from the equation at once. Elgar was never a contender, with his unacademic, lower-middle-class background coupled with progressive tendencies, while "Fritz" Delius was simply not English enough." The same writer suggests that Fuller Maitland's aversion to Sir Frederic Cowen was due to anti-Semitism.

A major concern of the movement was the collection and preservation of English folk songs. Stanford, Parry and Mackenzie were all founding members and vice-presidents of the Folk-Song Society from 1898. This was another barrier between the renaissance movement and outsiders. Sullivan and Elgar regarded folk music as neither important nor interesting, and Elgar was further distanced from the renaissance set by his antipathy to English music of the Tudor and early Stuart periods, which Fuller Maitland and others were enthusiastically propagating. (Note: Elgar called Tudor compositions "museum pieces". Sullivan was less dismissive of Tudor music; in a study of Sullivan's music, Gervase Hughes identifies occasional deliberate echoes of Thomas Morley and his slightly later contemporary John Dowland.)

Those identified as leading composers of the musical renaissance theory achieved positions of power and influence in the musical world. Mackenzie became principal of the Royal Academy of Music; and at the Royal College of Music, Parry succeeded George Grove as director, and Stanford was professor of composition, with pupils including Arthur Bliss, Frank Bridge, Herbert Howells, Gustav Holst, John Ireland and Ralph Vaughan Williams. The composer Sir John Stainer wrote, "Parry and Stanford are rapidly getting absolute control of all the music, sacred or secular, in England; and also over our provincial Festivals and Concert societies, and other performing bodies."

== Dissention ==
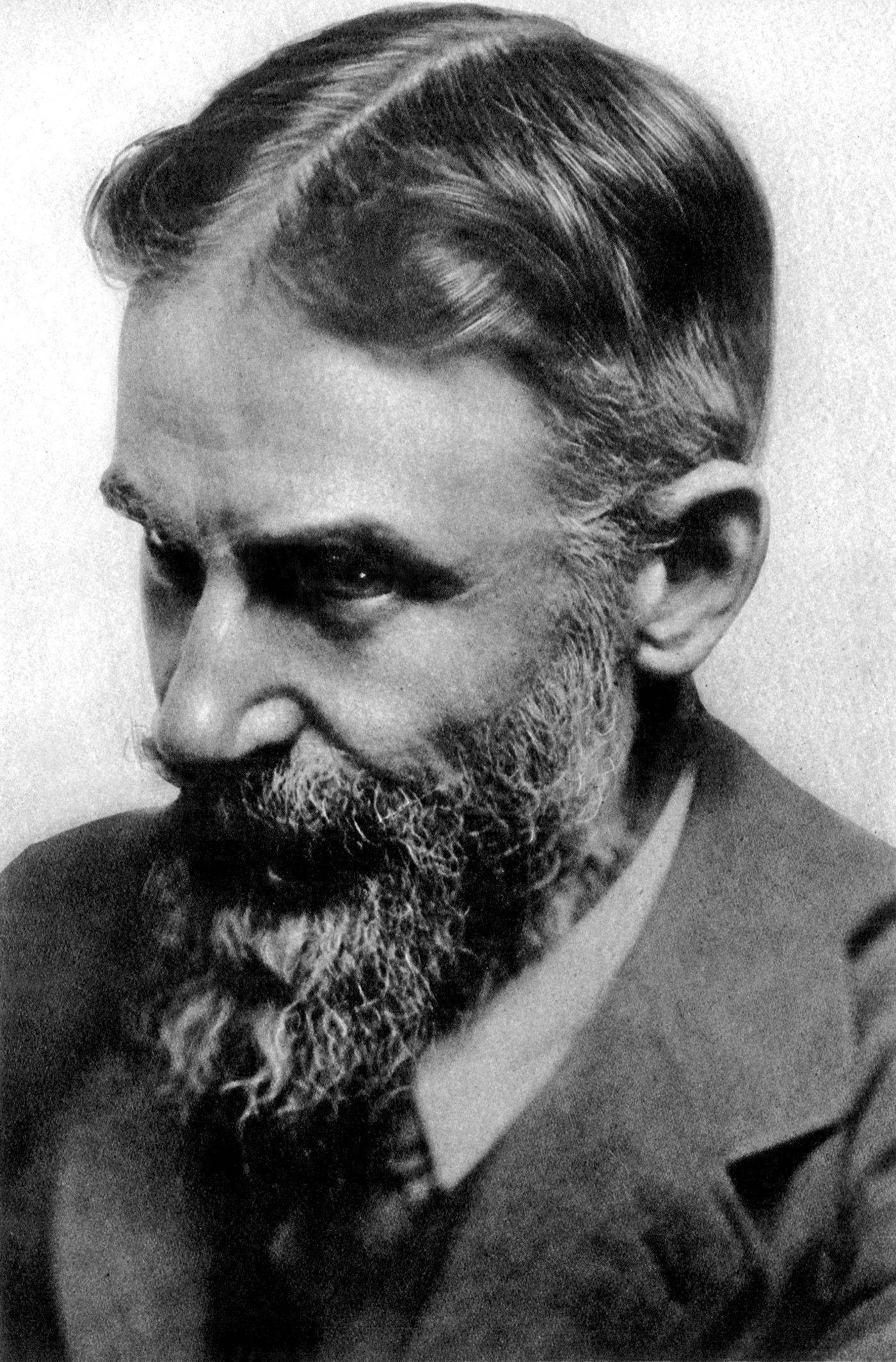
Bernard Shaw, scourge of the English renaissance circle

Bernard Shaw in his capacity as a music critic mocked the notion of an English musical renaissance led by Parry, Stanford and Mackenzie, describing their works as "sham classics" and characterising them as a "mutual admiration society":

[W]ho am I that I should be believed, to the disparagement of eminent musicians? If you doubt that [Stanford's oratorio] Eden is a masterpiece, ask Dr Parry and Dr Mackenzie, and they will applaud it to the skies. Surely Dr Mackenzie’s opinion is conclusive; for is he not the composer of Veni Creator, guaranteed as excellent music by Professor Stanford and Dr Parry? You want to know who Parry is? Why, the composer of Blest Pair of Sirens, as to the merits of which you only have to consult Dr Mackenzie and Professor Stanford.

The musicologist Colin Eatock writes that the term "English musical renaissance" carries "the implicit proposition that British music had raised itself to a stature equal to the best the continent had to offer"; among the continental composers of the period were Brahms, Tchaikovsky, Dvořák, Fauré, Bruckner, Mahler and Puccini. That idea was controversial at the time and later, though it retained its adherents well into the 20th century. Eatock notes that as late as 1966, Frank Howes, successor to Hueffer and Fuller Maitland at The Times, stated that the English musical renaissance was "an historical fact".

In 1993, Robert Stradling and Meirion Hughes argued that the proponents of the movement were "a self-appointed and self-perpetuating oligarchy" based at the Royal College of Music in London. Grove, Parry, and Vaughan Williams were "the dynastical figureheads of the renaissance establishment." Stradling and Hughes contended that this élite was single-minded to the point of ruthlessness in promoting its conception of British music, sidelining all native composers who did not conform to its aesthetic views. The composer Thomas Dunhill wrote that when he was a student at the Royal College under Parry "it was considered scarcely decent to mention Sullivan's name with approval in the building". Elgar, about whom Fuller Maitland wrote tepidly, was hailed by Richard Strauss as "the first progressive English musician."

The contention of Fuller Maitland and others that the "English musical renaissance" had brought British music into the world class is in contrast to the title of a 1904 book by the German writer Oscar Adolf Hermann Schmitz: Das Land ohne Musik: englische Gesellschaftsprobleme – "The Land without Music: problems of English society".

== Notes and references ==
Notes

== Sources ==
- Eatock, Colin (2010). "The Crystal Palace Concerts: Canon Formation and the English Musical Renaissance". 19th-Century Music. 34 (1). University of California: 87–105. doi:10.1525/ncm.2010.34.1.087. ISSN 0148-2076.
- Hughes, Gervase (1959). The Music of Sir Arthur Sullivan. London: Macmillan. OCLC 500626743.
- Kennedy, Michael (1970). Elgar: Orchestral Music. London: BBC. OCLC 252020259.
- Reed, W.H. (1946). Elgar. London: Dent. OCLC 8858707.
- Schaarwächter, Jürgen (2008). "Chasing a Myth and a Legend: 'The British Musical Renaissance' in a 'Land Without Music'". The Musical Times. 149 (1904): 53–59. doi:10.2307/25434554. JSTOR 25434554.
- Shaw, G. Bernard (1981). Dan Laurence (ed.). Shaw's Music: The Complete Music Criticism of Bernard Shaw, Volume 2 (1890–1893). London: The Bodley Head. ISBN 0-370-31271-6.
- Stradling, Robert; Meirion Hughes (2001). The English musical renaissance, 1840–1940: constructing a national music. Manchester: Manchester University Press. ISBN 0-7190-5829-5.
