= Alexander Mackenzie (composer) =

Scottish conductor and composer (1847–1935)

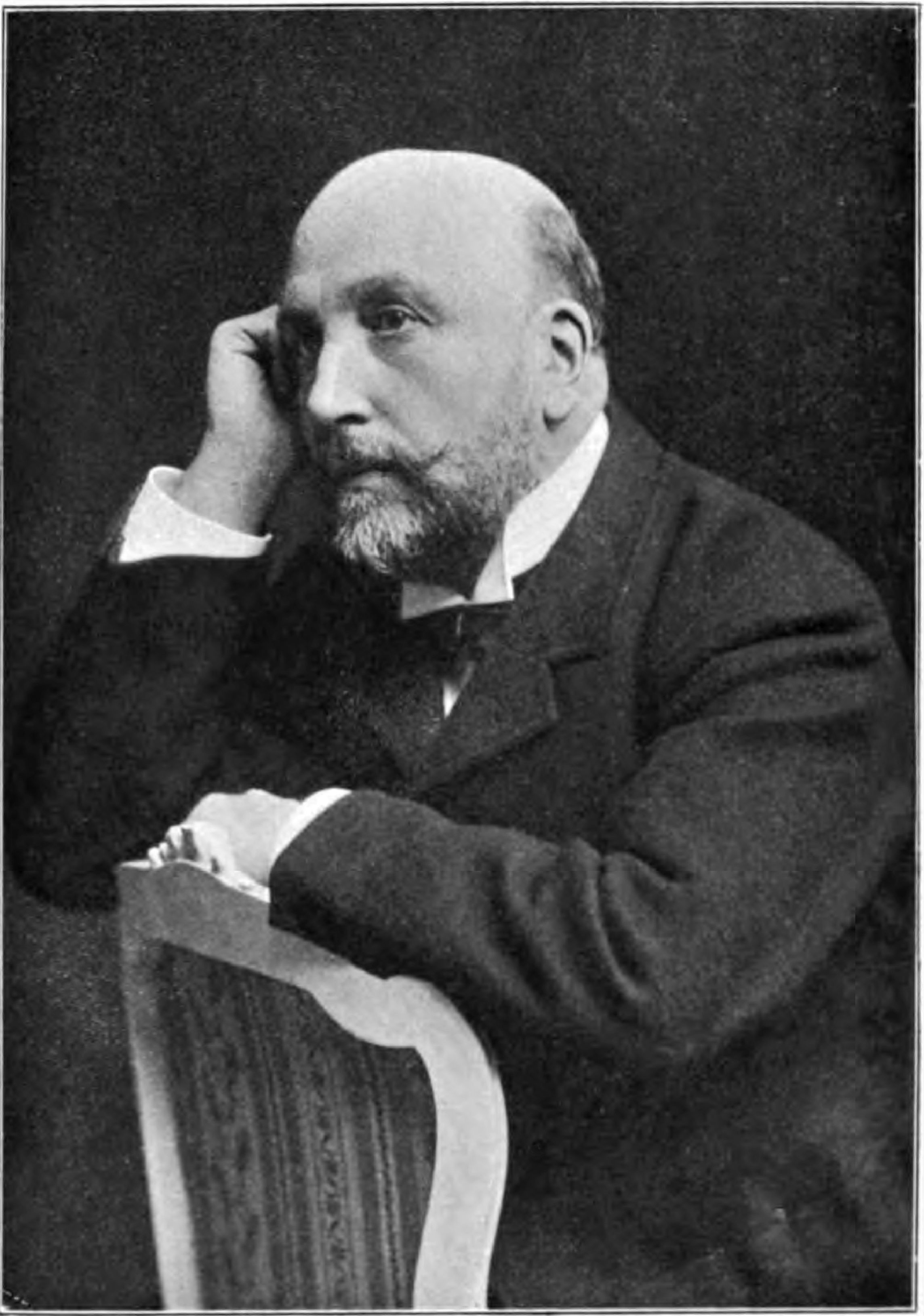
Alexander Mackenzie, 1898

Sir Alexander Campbell Mackenzie KCVO (22 August 1847 – 28 April 1935) was a Scottish composer, conductor and teacher best known for his oratorios, violin and piano pieces, Scottish folk music and works for the stage.

Mackenzie was a member of a musical family and was sent for his musical education to Germany. He had many successes as a composer, producing over 90 compositions, but from 1888 to 1924, he devoted a great part of his energies to running the Royal Academy of Music. Together with Hubert Parry and Charles Villiers Stanford, he was regarded as one of the fathers of the British musical renaissance in the late nineteenth century.

== Life and career ==
Mackenzie was born in Edinburgh, the eldest son of Alexander Mackenzie and his wife, Jessie Watson née Campbell. He was the fourth musician of his family. His great-grandfather was an army bandsman; his grandfather, John Mackenzie, was a violinist in Edinburgh and Aberdeen; his father was also a violinist, the conductor of the orchestra in the Theatre Royal, Edinburgh, and editor of The National Dance Music of Scotland. Mackenzie's musical talent emerged early: at the age of eight he was playing nightly in his father's orchestra. He was sent for his musical education to Germany, living with his teacher, the Stadtmusiker August Bartel, in Schwarzburg-Sondershausen in Thuringia, where he entered the conservatorium under K. W. Ulrich and Eduard Stein, remaining there from 1857 to 1861, when he entered the ducal orchestra as a violinist.

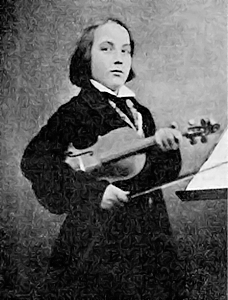
Mackenzie, aged 12. In 1927 he said, "If I could only finish my career with a head of hair like that, I should die happy."

Mackenzie wished to continue his violin studies with the teacher Prosper Sainton, who had taught his father, and in 1862 he successfully applied for admission to the Royal Academy of Music in London, where Sainton taught. His other tutors were the principal, Charles Lucas (harmony), and Frederick Bowen Jewson (piano). Shortly after starting at the Academy, he was awarded a King's Scholarship, the income from which Mackenzie augmented by playing in theatre and music hall pit-bands, as well as in classical concerts under the leading conductor Michael Costa. This sometimes caused him to neglect his academic work, and on one occasion, having failed to prepare a piece by a classical composer for a piano examination, he improvised, "starting off in A minor and taking care to end in the same key", and convinced the examiners that it was a little-known work by Schubert. Recalling this prank in his old age, he added, "I have never ceased to wonder at my escape, and would certainly not advise any student to run a similar risk today." Some of Mackenzie's early compositions were performed at the Academy.

=== Early career ===
In 1865 Mackenzie returned to Edinburgh. He undertook a heavy workload of teaching, both privately and in local colleges, and from 1870 he was in charge of music at St George's, Charlotte Square. In 1873 he took on the conductorship of the Scottish Vocal Association. He also played the violin in orchestral concerts both locally and at the Birmingham Festivals from 1864 to 1873, meeting visiting musicians including the conductor Hans von Bülow, who became a firm friend. In 1874 Mackenzie married a local woman, Mary Malina Burnside (d. 1925). They had a daughter, Mary. Mackenzie successfully began composing orchestral music. Bülow conducted his overture Cervantes in 1879, and two of his Scottish rhapsodies were premiered by August Manns in 1880 and 1881.

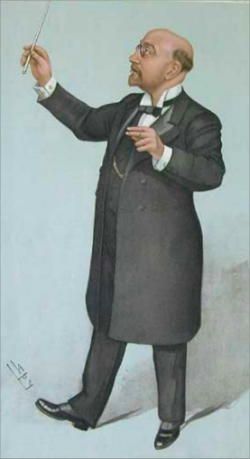
Mackenzie by "Spy"

By this time, Mackenzie's heavy workload as a teacher and player began to undermine his health. Two of Bülow's pupils in Florence, Italy, Giuseppe Buonamici and George F. Hatton, introduced Mackenzie to the musical philanthropists Carl and Jessie Hillebrand. After a few months' rest in their care, Mackenzie began composing full-time. Apart from a year in England (1885), he made Florence his home until 1888. During this period he spent much time in the company of Franz Liszt. He began composing large-scale works, including instrumental, orchestral and choral music and two operas. His cantatas The Bride and Jason were successfully given, and the Carl Rosa Company commissioned his first opera, Colomba, written to a libretto prepared by Francis Hueffer, music critic of The Times. The opera premiered successfully in 1883. A second opera, The Troubadour, produced by the same company in 1886, was less successful, though Liszt thought well enough of the piece to begin work on a piano fantasia based on themes from it. Pablo de Sarasate premiered a violin concerto by Mackenzie at the Birmingham Festival of 1885. For the 1885–86 season, Mackenzie was appointed conductor of Novello's oratorio concerts in London. Liszt paid his final visit to England chiefly to hear his Saint Elisabeth performed under Mackenzie's direction in 1886.

=== Peak years ===
In October 1887, the principal of the Royal Academy of Music, Sir George Macfarren, died, and in early 1888 Mackenzie was appointed to succeed him. He held the post for 36 years until his retirement in 1924. At the time, the Academy was overshadowed by its younger rival, the Royal College of Music, and Mackenzie set about reviving its reputation. He was fortunate in enjoying the friendly support of his opposite numbers at the College, George Grove, and, from 1895, Hubert Parry, and the two institutions established a close working relationship of mutual benefit. In addition to overhauling the curriculum and reorganising the faculty, Mackenzie engaged personally with his students by teaching composition and conducting the student orchestra. In 1912 the Academy moved from its old buildings in Mayfair to purpose-built premises in Marylebone. In his later years as principal, Mackenzie became markedly conservative, forbidding his students to play the chamber music of Ravel, which he stigmatised as "a pernicious influence".

Mackenzie was conductor of the Royal Choral Society and the Philharmonic Society Orchestra between 1892 and 1899, giving the British premières of many works, including symphonies by Tchaikovsky and Borodin.

Mackenzie (front c.), in 1910 with Parry (back l.), Stanford (front r.), Edward German (back r.) and Dan Godfrey

Like his father, Mackenzie took a great interest in folk music and produced several collections of arrangements of traditional Scottish songs. In 1903, interested in investigating Canadian folk-song, he undertook a tour of Canada organised by the Anglo-Canadian musician Charles A.E. Harriss. His visit stimulated the cultural scene and choral festival competitions were held throughout Canada with eleven new choral societies being founded. Mackenzie conducted concerts during the tour, exclusively of British music.

Mackenzie was regarded as a cosmopolitan musician. He spoke fluent German and Italian and was elected to the post of President of the International Musical Society which he held from 1908 to 1912. From his early days playing in orchestras in Edinburgh and Birmingham he had met and become friendly with many leading international musicians, including Clara Schumann, Joseph Joachim, Charles Gounod and Antonín Dvořák. His friendship with Liszt began in Mackenzie's student days in Sondershausen and lasted for the rest of Liszt's life.

Although Mackenzie composed a large number of works, which met with great public success, he found, as had Arthur Sullivan earlier and as did Parry contemporaneously, that running a large musical conservatoire left less time for composition. Both at the Academy and elsewhere, he was a popular lecturer. Among his topics were Verdi's opera Falstaff, the text of his lecture on which was later published in translation in Italy. Outliving his contemporaries Sullivan and Parry, he gave memorial lectures on their lives and works. At a time when Sullivan's reputation in academic musical circles was not high, Mackenzie's tribute was generous and enthusiastic.

In the late nineteenth and early twentieth centuries, Mackenzie's professional prominence brought him many honours from universities and learned societies in Britain and abroad. He was knighted in 1895, and created a Knight Commander of the Royal Victorian Order (KCVO) in 1922, the year of the centenary celebrations of the Royal Academy, in which he was the central figure. On 15 October 1923 the BBC broadcast one of the earliest examples of a one-composer programme, devoting one hour and 45 minutes to performances of Mackenzie's works, conducted by the composer. On his eighty-sixth birthday, over forty distinguished musicians presented him with a silver tray inscribed with facsimiles of their signatures, including Elgar, Delius, Ethel Smyth, Edward German, Henry Wood, and Landon Ronald. He retired from the Academy and from public life in 1924.

Mackenzie died in London in 1935 at the age of 87.

== Works ==
The Oxford Dictionary of National Biography says of Mackenzie's music that it is "cosmopolitan in style and somewhat old-fashioned for its period, displaying influences of French and German composers, including Bizet, Gounod, Schumann, and Wagner." Grove's Dictionary of Music and Musicians says that although Mackenzie's music was eclipsed by the works of later composers, "he and his contemporaries may be regarded as having laid the foundations of the musical renaissance in 19th- and early 20th-century Britain".

During his time teaching in Edinburgh, Mackenzie wrote several works, including a piano trio, a string quartet and a piano quartet, and he maintained a considerable output despite his crowded schedule both then and later. The Times reported that his list of compositions numbered 90, of which 20 were distinctly Scottish.

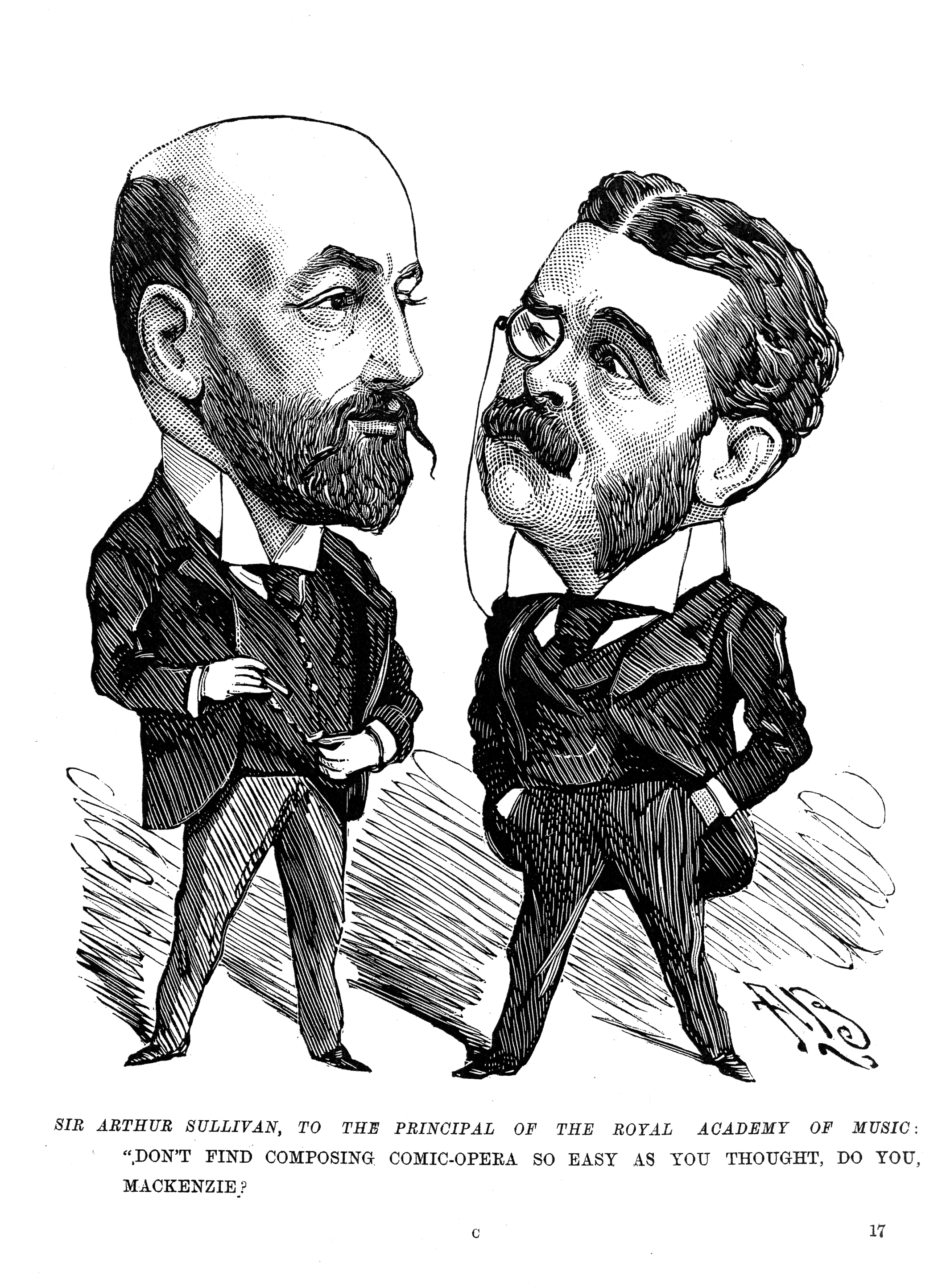
Cartoon alluding to the irony of the failure of His Majesty (1897) after Mackenzie had criticised Arthur Sullivan for "wasting his talents" on comic opera.

His orchestral works include the overture Cervantes, performed at Schwarzburg-Sondershausen in 1877, three Scottish Rhapsodies, a violin concerto premiered by Pablo de Sarasate at the Birmingham Festival of 1885, a "Scottish" concerto for piano (1895), a suite, London Day by Day (1902), and a Canadian Rhapsody (1905). He composed incidental music to six dramas, including the Walter Scott adaptation Ravenswood, and J. M. Barrie's The Little Minister. The funeral march from his music for Henry Irving's production of Coriolanus was played at Irving's funeral in 1905 and at Mackenzie's memorial service at St Paul's Cathedral in 1935. He worked on a symphony but did not complete it.

It was as a composer of vocal music that Mackenzie first achieved national fame. His cantata The Bride was a success at the Three Choirs Festival of 1881. Edward Elgar played in the violins at the première and later remarked that meeting Mackenzie was "the event of my musical life". A second cantata, Jason, for the Bristol festival of 1882, was also well received. His most famous choral work was the oratorio The Rose of Sharon, written for the Norwich festival of 1884. The words were adapted from the Song of Solomon by Joseph Bennett, music critic of The Daily Telegraph, who later provided Sullivan with the text for The Golden Legend. The Dream of Jubal (1889), is an unusual combination of recitation and choral sections, composed for the jubilee of the Liverpool Philharmonic Society in 1889.

Mackenzie's operas began in 1883 with Colomba, first produced by the Carl Rosa Company. It was a success, but his second opera The Troubadour (1886) was not. Francis Hueffer's libretti for both operas were written in an antiquated style that attracted much criticism. Mackenzie's other operas were The Cricket on the Hearth (1914), The Eve of St John (1924), and two almost-complete operas, The Cornish Opera and Le luthier.

Critics observed that Mackenzie's operatic and choral music was generally ill-served by his librettists: "Much of his best work ... is neglected, partly because unlike his contemporaries, Parry and Stanford, Mackenzie went for the texts of his larger vocal works to such librettists as Joseph Bennett and Hueffer, instead of to the vital things of English poetry and literature." "[He] was content with librettos written by hacks according to the current operatic conventions." This even applied to his one excursion into comic opera, His Majesty, a piece in the Gilbert and Sullivan vein, with a libretto by F. C. Burnand and R. C. Lehmann and additional lyrics by Adrian Ross, presented at the Savoy Theatre in 1897. The Times commented, "Mr Burnand's experience as a librettist of comic opera, and Sir Alexander Mackenzie's inexperience in this class of composition might lead the public to expect a brilliant book weighed down by music of too serious and ambitious a type. The exact opposite is the case." Burnand's libretto was judged dull and confused, but Mackenzie's music was "marked by distinction as well as humour."

Mackenzie also wrote books on Giuseppe Verdi (1913) and Franz Liszt (1920). In his memoirs A Musician's Narrative (1927), he described "a lifetime spent, boy and man, in the service of British music".
