= Peter J. Pirie =

English musicologist and critic

Peter J. Pirie (1916 – 1997) was an English musicologist and critic prominent in music journalism of the mid-twentieth century. Having left school with no formal qualifications, Pirie was self-taught in music until he won a composition scholarship to the Guildhall School of Music, where he studied piano, composition and conducting.

During the Second World War, he was a conscientious objector, and went to prison as a result. Once released, he was permitted to serve with the Light Rescue Service. After the war, Pirie and his family moved to Whitstable, Kent, where he helped to run a music and book shop, "Pirie and Cavender", which was in business until 2007. Later on, he moved to Sussex, near to the South Downs, which he loved deeply. His wife Mildred (1911–1996) was a member of the Society of Friends (Quakers) and active as a peace campaigner.

His writing about music mainly consisted of magazine articles, reviews of recordings and concerts, and record sleeve notes. He was a supporter of 20th-century English music, especially that of Arnold Bax and Frank Bridge. The Stratford & East London Music Festival awards a "Peter J. Pirie Memorial Prize" and a "Mildred Pirie Memorial Cup".

== See also ==
- English Musical Renaissance

== Books ==
- Frank Bridge, Triad Press (1971) ISBN 0-902070-02-9
- The English Musical Renaissance: Twentieth Century British Composers & Their Works, St. Martin's Press (1980) ISBN 0-312-25435-0
- Furtwängler and the Art of Conducting, Duckworth (1981) ISBN 0-7156-1486-X
