= Harry Ellis Wooldridge =

English musical antiquary, artist and Professor of Fine Arts

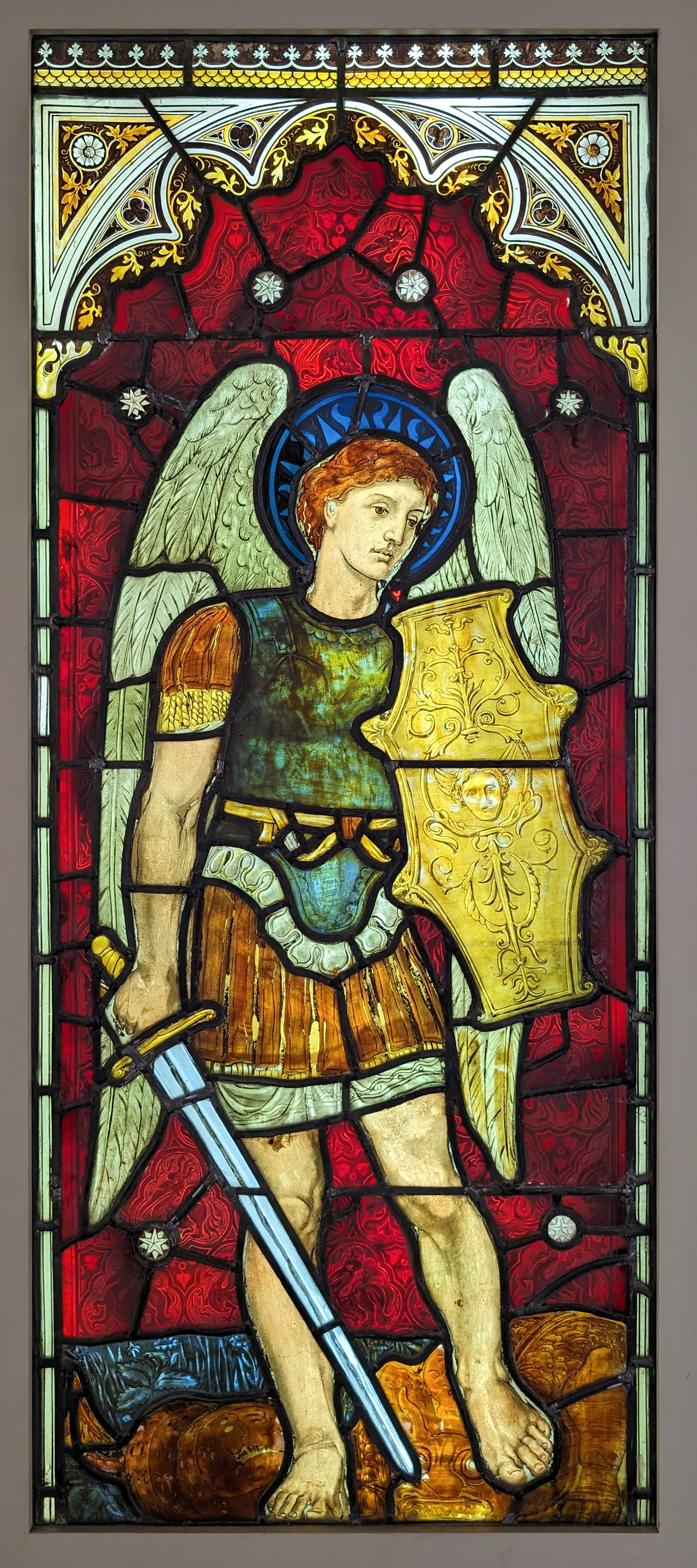
St Michael (1876)

Harry Ellis Wooldridge (28 March 1845 – 13 February 1917) was an English musical antiquary, artist and Professor of Fine Arts. His music collections included transcripts of 17th- and 18th-century Italian music.

He enrolled at the Royal Academy in 1865, becoming interested in early music at about the same time. He was studio assistant to Sir Edward Burne-Jones and later worked with Henry Holiday, the chief designer for James Powell and Sons, stained glass makers. Wooldridge was retained by Powell's and designed stained glass and tile paintings for more than twenty years.

His church commissions included a reredos for St Martin's Church in Brighton (described as his chef d'œuvre), and the painting of frescoes in St John-at-Hampstead.

His growing authority on early music led to his 1895 appointment, succeeding John Ruskin as Slade Professor of Fine Art at Oxford. His main contributions to music literature are a new edition of William Chappell's Popular Music of the Olden Time, which appeared under the title Old English Popular Music (1893) and The Polyphonic Period, parts I. and II. (vols. i. and ii. of the Oxford History of Music, 1901–05).

Wooldridge edited the Yattendon Hymnal (1895–1899) with his lifelong friend, the Poet Laureate, Robert Seymour Bridges, with whom he lived at one stage at 50 Maddox Street in London. The Palestrinian harmonization used in the hymnal's 80 plain songs was assisted by Monica Bridges. The Hymnal is regarded as "influential in the contemporary reform of hymnody and the revival of sixteenth and seventeenth century music".
