= HMS Invincible (1907) =

Battlecruiser of the Royal Navy

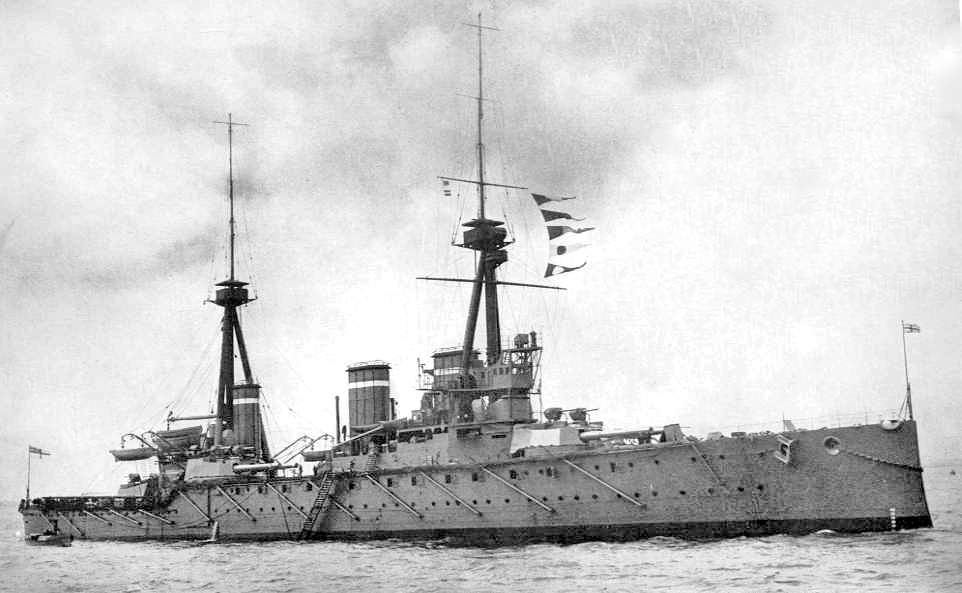

History

United Kingdom
- Name: Invincible
- Ordered: 1906 Naval Programme
- Builder: Armstrong Whitworth
- Laid down: 2 April 1906
- Launched: 13 April 1907
- Commissioned: 20 March 1909
- Fate: Sunk, 31 May 1916, during the Battle of Jutland

General characteristics
- Class & type: Invincible-class battlecruiser
- Displacement: 17,250 long tons (17,530 t); 20,420 long tons (20,750 t) at (deep load)
- Length: 567 ft (173 m) overall
- Beam: 78 ft 6 in (23.93 m)
- Draught: 30 ft (9.1 m) deep load
- Installed power: 31 × Yarrow boilers; 41,000 shp (31,000 kW)
- Propulsion: 4 × shafts; 2 × Direct-drive steam turbine sets
- Speed: 25.5 knots (47.2 km/h; 29.3 mph)
- Range: 3,090 nmi (5,720 km; 3,560 mi) at 10 knots (19 km/h; 12 mph)
- Complement: 784 (up to 1000 in wartime)
- Armament: 4 × twin 12 in (305 mm) guns; 16 × single 4 in (102 mm) guns; 5 × 18 in (450 mm) torpedo tubes
- Armour: Belt: 4–6 in (102–152 mm); Decks: 1.5–2.5 in (38–64 mm); Barbettes: 7 in (178 mm); Turrets: 7 in (178 mm); Conning tower: 6–10 in (152–254 mm); Torpedo bulkheads: 2.5 in (64 mm)

HMS Invincible was the lead ship of her class of three battlecruisers built for the Royal Navy during the first decade of the twentieth century and the first battlecruiser to be built by any country in the world. During the First World War, she participated in the Battle of Heligoland Bight in a minor role, as she was the oldest and slowest of the British battlecruisers present. During the Battle of the Falkland Islands, Invincible and her sister ship Inflexible sank the armoured cruisers Scharnhorst and Gneisenau almost without loss to themselves, despite numerous hits by the German ships.

She was the flagship of the 3rd Battlecruiser Squadron during the Battle of Jutland in 1916. The squadron had been detached from Admiral Beatty's Battlecruiser Fleet a few days before the battle for gunnery practice with the Grand Fleet and acted as its heavy scouting force during the battle. She was destroyed by a magazine explosion during the battle after the armour of one of her gun turrets was penetrated.

== Design and description ==
Invincible was significantly larger than her armoured cruiser predecessors of the Minotaur class. She had an overall length of 567 ft (173 m), a beam of 78.5 ft (23.9 m), and a draft of 30 ft (9.1 m) at deep load. She displaced 17,250 long tons (17,530 t) at load and 20,420 long tons (20,750 t) at deep load, nearly 3,000 long tons (3,000 t) more than the earlier ships.

The Invincible-class ships were formally known as armoured cruisers until 1911 when they were redesignated as battlecruisers by an Admiralty order of 24 November 1911. Unofficially a number of designations were used until then, including cruiser-battleship, dreadnought cruiser and battle-cruiser.

=== Propulsion ===
Invincible had two paired sets of Parsons turbines, each of which was housed in a separate engine-room and drove an outboard and inboard shaft. The high-pressure ahead and astern turbines were coupled to the outboard shafts and the low-pressure turbines to the inner shafts. A cruising turbine was also coupled to each inner shaft; these were not used often and were eventually disconnected. Her three-bladed propellers were 11 feet (3.4 m) in diameter on the inner shafts while the outer propellers were 10 feet (3.0 m) in diameter. The turbines were powered by thirty-one Yarrow water-tube boilers in four boiler rooms, and were designed to produce a total of 41,000 shaft horsepower (31,000 kW), but reached nearly 46,500 shp (34,700 kW) during trials in 1908. She was designed for 25 knots (46 km/h; 29 mph), but reached 26.64 knots (49.3 km/h; 30.7 mph) during trials.

Invincible carried 2,997 long tons (3,045 t) of coal, and an additional 738 long tons (750 t) of fuel oil that was to be sprayed on the coal to increase its burn rate. At full fuel capacity, she could steam for 3,090 nautical miles (5,720 km; 3,560 mi) at a speed of 10 knots (19 km/h; 12 mph). Her electrical power was provided by four 200 kW turbo-generators and motor generators with capacity of 100 kW.

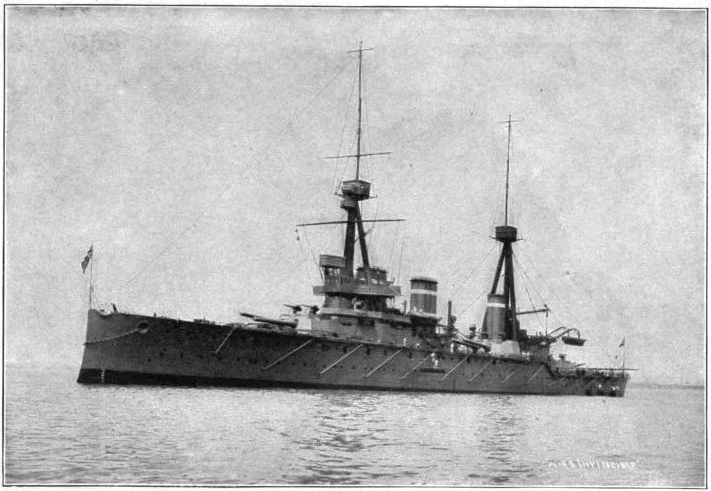
Invincible before 1911

=== Armament ===
Invincible carried eight BL 12-inch (305 mm) Mk X guns in four twin turrets. For evaluation purposes these were electrically driven BIX and BX turrets, two each built by Vickers and Armstrongs. They proved to be a failure despite two lengthy refits in 1909 and 1911 and were converted to hydraulic power during her refit in early 1914 at a cost of £151,200. The situation was so bad during her gunnery trials in October 1908 that the captain of HMS Excellent, the Royal Navy's chief gunnery school, described their operation in the following manner: "When the order was given to train the turret, elevate or run a gun in or out, it was only necessary to push a button, or move a switch, but the result was often a flash of blue flame which seemed to fill the turret."

Her secondary armament consisted of sixteen 4-inch (102 mm) QF Mk III guns. During 1915 the turret roof guns were transferred to the superstructure and the total number of guns was reduced to twelve. All of the remaining guns were enclosed in casemates and given blast shields at that time to better protect the gun crews from weather and enemy action. Her anti-aircraft armament consisted of a single QF 3 inch 20 cwt AA gun on a high-angle MkII mount at the aft end of the superstructure that was carried between October–November 1914 and from April 1915 onwards. A 3-pounder Hotchkiss gun on a high-angle MkIc mounting with a maximum elevation of 60° was also mounted in November 1914. Five 18 in (450 mm) submerged torpedo tubes were fitted on the Invincibles, two on each side and one in the stern. Fourteen torpedoes were carried for them.

=== Armour ===
The waterline belt was 6 inches thick roughly between the fore and aft 12-inch gun turrets, but was reduced to four inches from the fore turret to the bow, and did not extend aft of the rear turret. The gun turrets and barbettes were protected by 7 in (178 mm) of armour, except for the turret roofs which used 3 in (76 mm) of Krupp non-cemented armour (KNC). The thickness of the main deck was 1–2 in (25–51 mm) and the lower deck armour was 1.5–2.5 in (38–64 mm). Mild steel torpedo bulkheads of 2.5-inch thickness were fitted abreast the magazines and shell rooms.

== Construction and career ==
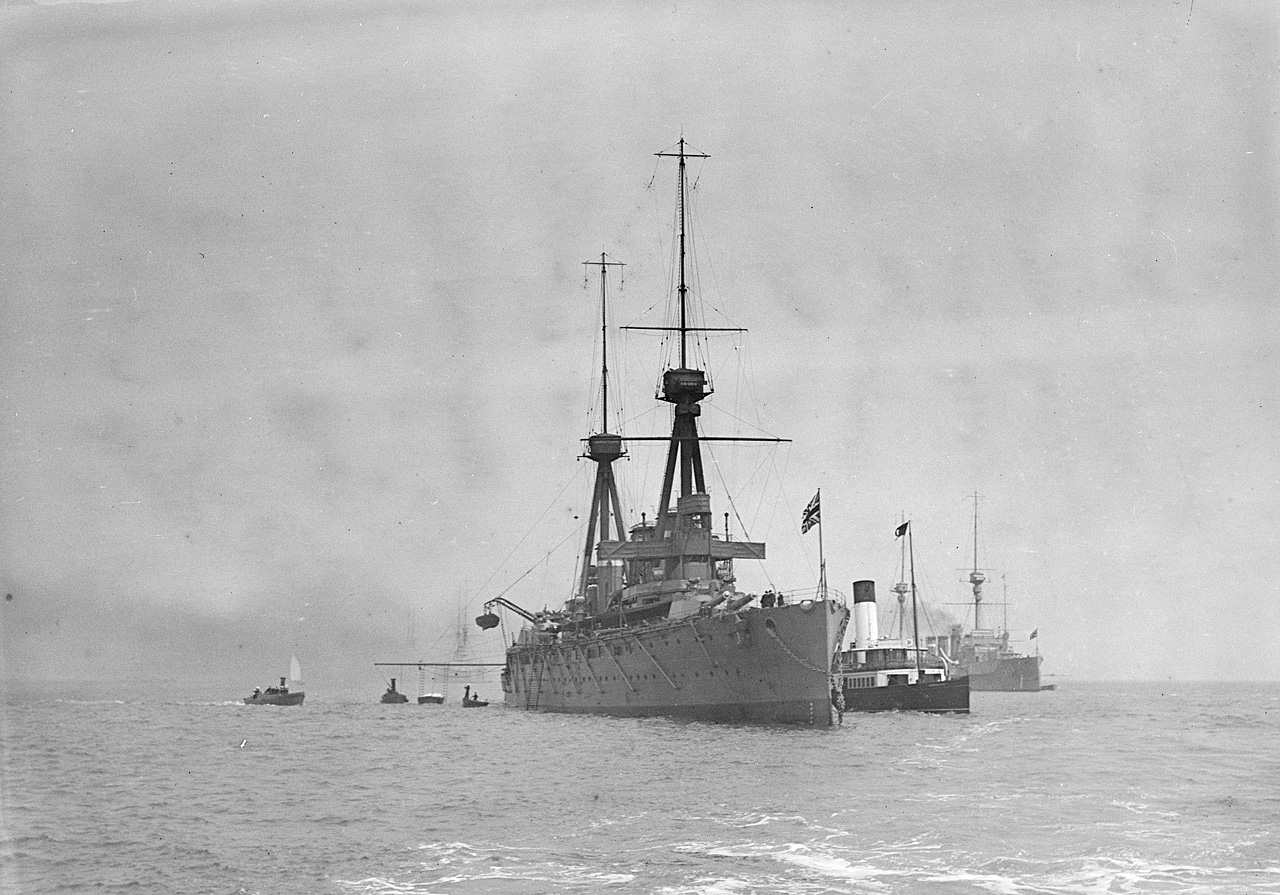
Invincible anchored at Spithead in June–July 1909

The ship was built at Sir W. G. Armstrong, Whitworth & Co., Ltd on Tyneside. She was laid down on 2 April 1906, and launched at 15:00 on 13 April 1907 by Lady Allendale. On 28 December 1907, while still fitting out, she was hit by the Swedish collier Oden, which resulted in the buckling of beams and frames in the hull and five bottom plates being stove in. She was officially completed on 16 March 1909. On 18 March, she sailed from the Tyne to Portsmouth, where she would be commissioned. On the way, she collided with the brigantine Mary Ann, and stood by until the lifeboat John Birch arrived from Yarmouth to take the brigantine in tow.

She was commissioned into the 1st Cruiser Squadron of the Home Fleet on 20 March 1909 and participated in fleet manoeuvres in April and June 1909, the Spithead Review on 12 June 1909, and the Fleet Review off Southend on 2 July. She was refitted between 17 August and 17 January 1910 in an attempt to cure the electrical problems with her turrets, but they were still unsatisfactory. Another attempt was made to bring her turrets to working order during a refit in the spring of 1911, but this too was unsuccessful and the decision was made the following year to convert her turrets to hydraulic power. This was delayed until after her deployment to join the Mediterranean Fleet in August 1913. On 17 March 1913, she collided with the submarine C34, but the collision was ruled the fault of the submarine. She returned to the UK in December 1913 in preparation for a major refit that would finally give her turrets hydraulic power and make her battle-worthy.

=== First World War ===
Her refit at Portsmouth Dockyard began in March 1914 and was interrupted by the declaration of war on Germany on 4 August. She'd been formally recommissioned the day prior, but the turret work required another week to complete. Invincible was the first battlecruiser to be fitted with a new fire-control director, but this could not be completed in the allotted time and would remain inoperable until she was refitted after the Battle of the Falkland Islands. She was declared operational on 12 August, when Rear-Admiral Sir Archibald Gordon Moore, commanding the 2nd Battlecruiser Squadron, hoisted his flag in her. He was ordered to the Humber, along with the battlecruiser New Zealand, where he could better support the British ships patrolling the Broad Fourteens.

==== Battle of Heligoland Bight ====
Invincible's first action was as part of the battlecruiser force under the command of Admiral Beatty during the Battle of Heligoland Bight operation on 28 August 1914. Beatty's ships had originally been intended as distant support of the British cruisers and destroyers closer to the German coast in case large units of the High Seas Fleet sortied in response to the British attacks. They turned south at full speed at 11:35 (Note: The times used in this section are in Coordinated Greenwich Mean Time, which is one hour behind CET, which is often used in German works.) when the British light forces failed to disengage on schedule and the rising tide meant that German capital ships would be able to clear the bar at the mouth of the Jade estuary. The brand-new light cruiser Arethusa had been crippled earlier in the battle and was under fire from the German light cruisers Strassburg and Cöln when Beatty's battlecruisers loomed out of the mist at 12:37. Strassburg was able to duck into the mists and evade fire, but Cöln remained visible and was quickly crippled by fire from the squadron. Beatty was distracted from the task of finishing her off by the sudden appearance of the elderly light cruiser Ariadne directly to his front. He turned in pursuit and reduced her to a flaming hulk in only three salvos at close range (under 6,000 yards (5.5 km)). At 13:10, Beatty turned north and made a general signal to retire. At this time, Invincible, trailing the main body of battlecruisers, opened fire on Cöln. She fired 18 rounds, all misses, before Beatty's main body encountered the crippled Cöln shortly after turning north and she was sunk by two salvos from Lion.

==== Battle of the Falklands ====
The West Indies Squadron of Rear-Admiral Christopher Cradock was destroyed by the German East Asia Squadron commanded by Vice-Admiral Graf Maximilian von Spee during the Battle of Coronel on 1 November 1914. In response, the Admiralty ordered that a squadron be sent to destroy the Germans. The squadron, under the command of Vice-Admiral Sir Doveton Sturdee, consisted of Invincible (flag) and Inflexible. They departed on 11 November and met up with several other cruisers under Rear Admiral Stoddard at Abrolhos Rocks, off the coast of Brazil on the 26th. They departed the following day and reached Port Stanley in the Falklands on the morning of 7 December.

Spee, making a leisurely voyage back to the Atlantic, wanted to destroy the radio station at Port Stanley and sent the armoured cruiser SMS Gneisenau and the light cruiser Nürnberg to see if the harbour was clear of British warships on the morning of 8 December. They were spotted at 07:30, although the pre-dreadnought Canopus, grounded in Stanley Harbour to defend the town and its wireless station, did not receive the signal until 07:45. Sturdee was not expecting an engagement and most of his ships were coaling – and hence temporarily defenceless. The armoured cruiser Cornwall and the light cruiser Bristol had one or both of their engines under repair. The armed merchant cruiser Macedonian was patrolling the outer harbour entrance while the armoured cruiser Kent was anchored in the outer harbour, scheduled to relieve the Macedonian at 08:00. The German ships were not expecting resistance and the first salvo from Canopus's guns at 09:20 caused them to sheer off from their bombardment of the wireless station and fall back on Spee's main body.

Sturdee's ships did not sortie from the harbour until 09:50, although they could see the retreating German ships on the southwest horizon. The Invincibles, fresh out of dry dock, had a 5 knots (9.3 km/h; 5.8 mph) advantage over Spee's ships, which all had fouled bottoms that limited their speeds to no more than 20 knots (37 km/h; 23 mph). The light cruiser Leipzig lagged behind the other ships and Inflexible opened fire when the range dropped to 17,500 yards (16,000 m) at 12:55. Invincible opened fire shortly afterward and both ships began straddling Leipzig as the range closed to 13,000 yards (12,000 m). At 13:20, Spee ordered his squadron to separate and ordered his light cruisers to turn to the southwest, while his armoured cruisers turned north east to cover their retreat. The German ships opened fire at 13:30 and scored their first hit at 13:44 when Scharnhorst struck Invincible, though the shell burst harmlessly on the belt armour. Both sides fired rapidly during the first half-hour of the engagement, before Sturdee opened up the distance to put his ships outside the effective range of the German guns. British gunnery was very poor, scoring only four hits out of 210 rounds fired. The primary cause was the smoke from the guns and funnels, since the British were upwind of the Germans, though one gun of Invincible's 'A' turret jammed at 13:42 and was out of action for thirty minutes.

Spee turned to the south in an attempt to disengage while the British had their vision obscured, but only opened the range to 17,000 yards (16,000 m) before his course change was spotted. The British battlecruisers gave chase at 24 knots (44 km/h; 28 mph). Forty minutes later, the British opened fire again at 15,000 yards (14 km). Eight minutes later Spee turned again to the east to give battle. His strategy was to close the range so he could bring his 15 cm (5.9 in) secondary armament into play. He was successful and the 15 cm guns were able to open fire at 15:00 at maximum elevation. The smoke bothered both sides, but multiple hits were scored. Those of the German ships either failed to detonate or hit armoured areas. However, Gneisenau's starboard engine room was put out of action. Sturdee ordered his ships at 15:15 to cross their own wakes to gain the windward advantage. Spee turned to the northwest, as if to attempt to cross the British T, but actually to bring Scharnhorst's undamaged starboard guns to bear as most of those on his port side were now out of action. The British continued to hit Scharnhorst and Gneisenau regularly and Scharnhorst ceased fire at 16:00 before capsizing at 16:17 with no survivors. Gneisenau had been slowed by earlier damage and was battered for another hour and a half by Inflexible and Invincible at ranges down to 4,000 yards (3,700 m). Despite the damage her crew continued to fire back until she ceased firing at 16:47, her ammunition exhausted. Sturdee was ready to order 'Cease fire' at 17:15 when an ammunition hoist was freed up and she made her last shot. The British then pounded her until 17:50, after her captain had given the order to scuttle her at 17:40. She slowly capsized at 18:00 and the British were able to rescue 176 men from the freezing waters. Invincible had fired 513 shells from her main guns during the battle, but had been hit twenty-two times. Two of her bow compartments were flooded, and one hit on her waterline abreast 'P' turret had flooded a coal bunker and temporarily given her a 15° list. Nevertheless, only one man had been killed and five wounded aboard the battlecruisers.

After the battle, Invincible made temporary repairs at Port Stanley and headed for Gibraltar, where she could be drydocked for more permanent repairs. This took a month, and the opportunity was taken to extend the height of her fore funnel by 15 feet (4.6 m) to reduce the amount of smoke blocking visibility from the bridge and spotting top. Invincible sailed to England on 15 February 1915 and joined the Grand Fleet. On 21 February, the British battlecruiser force was organised into three squadrons of the Battlecruiser Fleet, with the 3rd Battlecruiser Squadron (BCS) that was to consist of the three Invincible-class ships once Inflexible arrived from the Mediterranean. She was refitted between 25 April and 12 May to have four worn-out 12-inch guns replaced and the secondary armament reduced and given casemates. Rear-Admiral Horace Hood took command of the 3rd BCS on 27 May 1915 and hoisted his flag in Invincible.

The 1st and 3rd BCS had sortied in response to the German bombardment of Yarmouth and Lowestoft on 24–25 April 1916, but failed to locate the German ships in heavy weather. During the return home, Invincible was rammed by the patrol yacht Goissa at 23:07. Goissa's bow was embedded in Invincible's side which partially stove-in. Invincible's speed was reduced to 12 knots (22 km/h; 14 mph) through flooding and she was forced to haul out of line and proceed independently to Rosyth for repairs which lasted until 22 May 1916.

==== Battle of Jutland ====
Invincible exploding at Jutland, taken from a destroyer nearby.

At the end of May 1916, the 3rd Battlecruiser Squadron was temporarily assigned to the Grand Fleet for gunnery practice. On 30 May, the entire Grand Fleet, along with Admiral Beatty's battlecruisers, had been ordered to sea to prepare for an excursion by the German High Seas Fleet. In order to support Beatty, Admiral Hood took his three battlecruisers ahead of the Grand Fleet. At about 14:30, Invincible intercepted a radio message from the British light cruiser Galatea, attached to Beatty's Battlecruiser Force, reporting the sighting of two enemy cruisers. This was amplified by other reports of seven enemy ships steering north. Hood interpreted this as an attempt to escape through the Skagerrak and ordered an increase in speed to 22 kn (41 km/h) at 15:11 and steered East-Southeast to cut off the fleeing ships. Twenty minutes later, Invincible intercepted a message from Beatty reporting five enemy battlecruisers in sight and later signals reporting that he was engaging the enemy on a south-easterly course. At 16:06, Hood ordered full speed and a course of south-southeast in an attempt to converge on Beatty. At 16:56, with no British ships in sight, Hood requested Beatty's course, position and speed, but never received a reply.

Hood continued on course until 17:40, when gunfire was spotted in the direction to which his light cruiser Chester had been dispatched to investigate other gunfire flashes. Chester encountered four light cruisers of Hipper's 2nd Scouting Group and was badly damaged before Hood turned to investigate and was able to drive the German cruisers away from Chester. At 17:53, Invincible opened fire on Wiesbaden and the other two Invincibles followed two minutes later. The German ships turned for the south after fruitlessly firing torpedoes at 18:00 and attempted to find shelter in the mist. As they turned Invincible hit Wiesbaden in the engine room and knocked out her engines while Inflexible hit Pillau once. The 2nd Scouting Group was escorted by the light cruiser Regensburg and 31 destroyers of the 2nd and 9th Flotillas and the 12th Half-Flotilla which attacked the 3rd BCS in succession. They were driven off by Hood's remaining light cruiser Canterbury and the five destroyers of his escort. In a confused action, the Germans only launched 12 torpedoes and disabled the destroyer Shark with gunfire. Having turned due west to close on Beatty's ships, the three Invincible-class battlecruisers were broadside to the oncoming torpedoes, but Invincible turned north, while Inflexible and Indomitable turned south to present their narrowest profile to the torpedoes. All the torpedoes missed, although one passed underneath Inflexible without detonating. As Invincible turned north, her helm jammed and she had to come to a stop to fix the problem, but this was quickly done and the squadron reformed heading west.

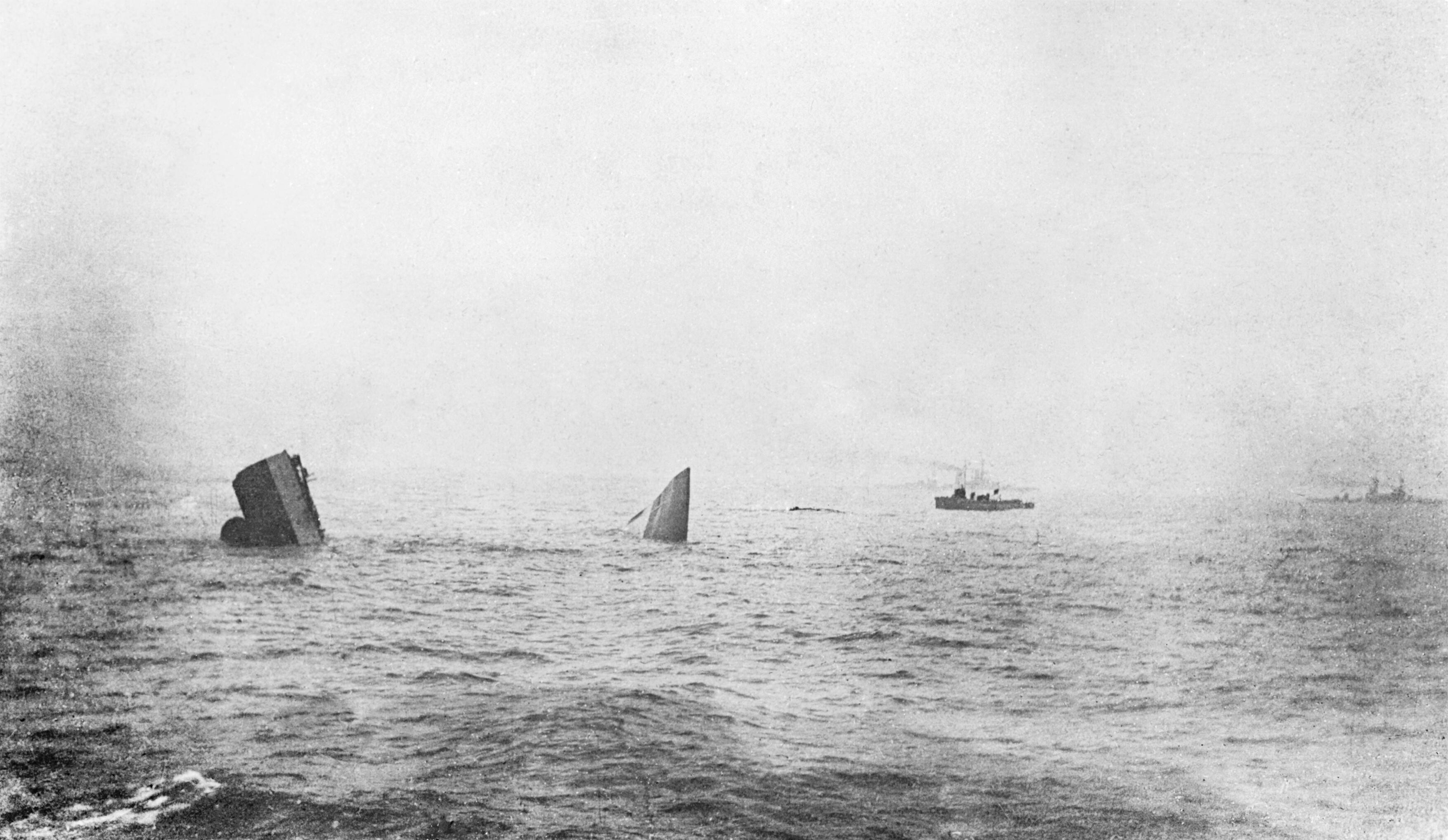
The two shattered halves of Invincible temporarily standing on the seabed

At 18:21, with both Beatty and the Grand Fleet converging on him, Hood turned south to lead Beatty's battlecruisers. Hipper's battlecruisers were 9,000 yards (8.2 km/5.1 mi) away and the Invincibles almost immediately opened fire on Hipper's flagship Lützow and Derfflinger. Indomitable hit Derfflinger three times and Seydlitz once, while the Lützow quickly took 10 hits from Lion, Inflexible and Invincible, including two hits below the waterline forward by Invincible that would ultimately doom her. At 18:30 Invincible abruptly appeared as a clear target before Lützow and Derfflinger. The two German ships then fired three salvoes each at Invincible and sank her in 90 seconds. At least one 305 mm (12-inch) shell from the third salvo struck her midships 'Q' turret. The shell penetrated the front of 'Q' turret, blew off the roof and detonated the midships magazines, which blew the ship in half. The explosion possibly ignited 'A' and 'X' magazines. Of her complement, 1,026 officers and men were killed, including Rear-Admiral Hood. There were only six survivors picked up by the destroyer Badger. Five of the six were stationed in the fore-control top located on the tripod foremast, including the gunnery officer Commander Hubert E. Dannreuther; the other man was stationed in the rangefinder atop 'Q' turret itself. When the magazine exploded he was somehow thrown clear of the ship.

== Wreck site ==
After the war, the Invincible was located by a Royal Navy minesweeper lying on a sandy bottom at a depth of 180 feet (55 m) at 57°02′40″N 06°07′15″E. The battlecruiser's stern is right-side up and the bow upside-down.

Examination of the wreck has found that the 12 inch guns in the aft turret remain loaded although its roof is missing. A contemporary photograph of the explosion that destroyed Invincible shows flame and smoke erupting from 'X' turret. Coupled with the aft turret's missing roof, it implies that 'X' magazine also caused a low-order explosion within the ship. (Note: A low-order explosion describes an explosive event where the blast pressure wave moves slowly forward displacing or wrenching (rather than shattering) objects in its path.)

Invincible is a protected site under the Protection of Military Remains Act 1986. Mount Invincible in the Canadian Rockies was named after the battlecruiser in 1917.

== Bibliography ==
- Brown, David K. (1999). The Grand Fleet: Warship Design and Development 1906–1922. Annapolis, Maryland: Naval Institute Press. ISBN 1-55750-315-X.
- Brown, David K. (2003). "HMS Invincible: The Explosion at Jutland and its Relevance to HMS Hood". Warship International. Vol. XL, no. 4. pp. 339–349. ISSN 0043-0374.
- Burt, R. A. (1986). British Battleships of World War One. Annapolis, Maryland: Naval Institute Press. ISBN 0-87021-863-8.
- Campbell, John (1986). Jutland: An Analysis of the Fighting. Annapolis, Maryland: Naval Institute Press. ISBN 0-87021-324-5.
- Hythe, Viscount, ed. (1914). The Naval Annual 1914. London: William Clowes and Sons. OCLC 46594208.
- Johnston, Ian & Buxton, Ian (2013). The Battleship Builders – Constructing and Arming British Capital Ships. Annapolis, Maryland: Naval Institute Press. ISBN 978-1-59114-027-6.
- Massie, Robert K. (2003). Castles of Steel: Britain, Germany, and the Winning of the Great War at Sea. New York: Random House. ISBN 0-679-45671-6.
- McCartney, Innes (December 2013). "Jutland 1916: The Archaeology of a Modern Naval Battle: The Wreck of HMS Invincible, The World's First Battle Cruiser" [Deutsche Gesellschaft zur Förderung der Unterwasserarchäologie]. SKYLLIS, the Journal of the German Society for the Promotion of Underwater Archaeology. 12 (2). OCLC 786134501.
- Preston, Antony (1985). "Great Britain and Empire Forces". In Gray, Randal (ed.). Conway's All the World's Fighting Ships 1906–1921. Annapolis, Maryland: Naval Institute Press. pp. 1–104. ISBN 0-85177-245-5.
- Roberts, John (1997). Battlecruisers. Annapolis, Maryland: Naval Institute Press. ISBN 1-55750-068-1.
- Roberts, John A. (1972). Warship Monographs: Invincible Class. London: Conway Maritime Press. ISBN 0-85177-051-7.
- Tarrant, V. E. (1986). Battlecruiser Invincible: The History of the First Battlecruiser, 1909–16. Annapolis, Maryland: Naval Institute Press. ISBN 0-87021-147-1.
