= Hubert Dannreuther =

British admiral (1880–1977)

Rear-Admiral Hubert Dannreuther DSO
- Born: 12 December 1880
- Died: 12 August 1977 (aged 96); Leamington Spa
- Military career
- Allegiance: United Kingdom
- Branch: Royal Navy
- Service years: 1895–1932
- Rank: Rear-Admiral
- Commands: HMS Dauntless; Flinders Naval Depot; HMS Eagle; Royal Naval Barracks, Portsmouth
- Conflicts: First World War; Battle of Heligoland Bight; Battle of the Falkland Islands; Battle of Jutland
- Awards: Order of St. Anna (Russia); Croix de Guerre (France)

Rear-Admiral Hubert Edward Dannreuther DSO (12 December 1880 – 12 August 1977) was a British admiral and one of six survivors of the sinking of HMS Invincible during the Battle of Jutland.

== Early life ==
Hubert Dannreuther was born the son of the German pianist Edward Dannreuther and Chariclea Anthea Euterpe (Ionides) Dannreuther (1844–1923). He was a godson of Richard Wagner. His eldest brother Tristan Dannreuther (1872–1963) also served as an officer in the Royal Navy, and was an Assistant Director of Naval Intelligence after WWI.

He joined HMS Britannia as a naval cadet in 1895. After being made chief naval cadet in 1896 he was sent to the Australia station as a midshipsman on board HMS Flora. In Australia he served on HMS Orlando and HMS Royal Arthur, and was promoted to sub-lieutenant on 15 October 1900. He served on HMS Doris in the Channel Fleet from late Spring 1902, and was promoted to lieutenant on 15 October 1902. In February 1903 he transferred to the battleship HMS Mars, also serving in the Channel Fleet. He was from 1911 to 1912 gunnery officer on board HMS Exmouth in the Mediterranean Fleet.

== First World War ==
Invincible in the midst of the explosion that sank her at Jutland

During the First World War he served as gunnery officer of HMS Invincible during the Battle of Heligoland Bight and the Battle of the Falkland Islands. For this he was mentioned in dispatches and promoted to commander.

At the Battle of Jutland on 31 May 1916, HMS Invincible was the flagship of the 3rd Battlecruiser Squadron. She was hit in her "Q" turret by a salvo from SMS Derfflinger, which blew the roof off the turret over the side. It was either this shell hit which caused a flash down the magazine or a second shell in the same salvo that penetrated the armour and exploded in the magazine, causing a massive explosion. The ship broke in two and sank with the loss of all but six of her crew of 1,021. Dannreuther was amongst those few rescued. After 20 minutes in the freezing waters of the North Sea, Dannreuther was rescued by the destroyer HMS Badger.

For his service at Jutland he was mentioned in dispatches and awarded the DSO and the Russian Order of St. Anna, 3rd Class, with Swords. Upon his return to Britain he was awarded the privilege of an audience at Buckingham Palace with King George V and Queen Mary.

From 1916 to 1918 Dannreuther served as commander on HMS Renown. In 1917 he was awarded the French Croix de Guerre with palms.

== Later life ==
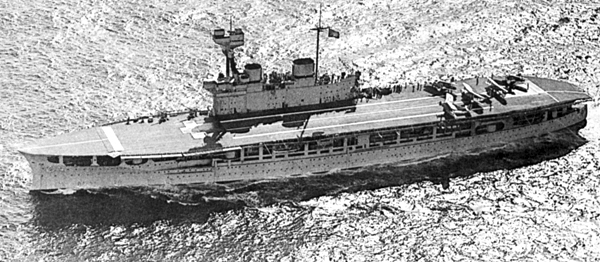
HMS Eagle, which Dannreuther commanded between 1929 and 1930

From 1919 to 1920, Dannreuther served on HMS Excellent. Promoted to captain in 1920, he was made Vice-President of the Chemical warfare Committee from 1920 to 1923. From 1924 to 1926, he commanded the cruiser HMS Dauntless. From 1927 to 1929, Dannreuther served as Superintendent of Training of the Royal Australian Navy while simultaneously commanding the Flinders Naval Depot. Dannreuther commanded the aircraft carrier HMS Eagle from 1929 to 1930. Promoted to commodore, from 1931 to 1932, he commanded the Royal Naval Barracks in Portsmouth and he was appointed Naval Aide-de Camp to the King from 23 September 1932 onwards. In 1932, he was promoted to Rear-Admiral and placed on the retired list. In 1939 he held the position of Assistant Director General, Control Division, Ministry of Information.

He married Janie Hay Thorborn in 1916 and they had three children, Hubert Harold (b. 1917), Ion Alexander (b. 1920) and Raymond Portal (b. 1923); Hubert and Raymond were both Captains in the Royal Navy, Hubert serving on HMS Cossack during the "Altmark incident". Dannreuther died on 12 August 1977 in Leamington Spa.
