= Percy Buck =

English musician (1871–1947)

- Born: 25 March 1871; West Ham, Essex, England
- Died: 3 October 1947 (aged 76); Hindhead, Surrey, England
- Spouse: Lucy Bond (m. 1896; died 1940)
- Children: 5

Academic background
- Education: Merchant Taylors' School; Guildhall School of Music; Royal College of Music

Academic work
- Institutions: Worcester College, Oxford; Trinity College, Dublin; Royal College of Music; University of London

Sir Percy Carter Buck (25 March 1871 – 3 October 1947) was an English music educator, writer, organist, and composer.

== Early life and education ==
Percy Buck was born in West Ham, London, and studied at Merchant Taylors' School, the Guildhall School of Music under Charles Joseph Frost (1848-1918) and Francis Davenport, and then at Royal College of Music, where his teachers were Walter Parratt, C.H. Lloyd, Hubert Parry and John Arthur St. Oswald Dykes.

== Career ==
From 1891 until 1894 he was organ scholar at Worcester College, Oxford, where he became friends with William Henry Hadow, Classics Tutor there at the time, who became the first editor of the Oxford History of Music in 1896. Buck was appointed organist at Wells Cathedral (1896–99), then Bristol Cathedral (1899–1901). He became director of music at Harrow School in 1901 and held that post until 1927. While at Harrow, Buck served on the editorial board of the ten-volume anthology Tudor Church Music.

From 1910 to 1920, Buck was Professor of Music at Trinity College, Dublin; this was a non-residential post, succeeding Ebenezer Prout. His pupils during this period included Ina Boyle. In 1919 Sir Hugh Allen invited him to join the staff of the Royal College of Music, where he set up a teacher's training course, contributing his own lectures on psychology. In 1925, Buck became the King Edward Professor of Music in the University of London.

In 1926 he started the RCM Junior Department with Miss Angela Bull, a "feeder system" for students financed by the London County Council. Several successful students have gone through this program and it continues to this day. From 1927 to 1936, he was music adviser to the London County Council, where he developed new facilities for further training of children with special talent, and where he overhauled the music in the curriculum of schools. Buck received a knighthood in 1937 on retiring from the University of London, while continuing his duties at the Royal College, supervising teachers and taking the occasional composition student, including Madeleine Dring for two years from 1938.

== Personal life ==
Buck married Lucy Bond, daughter of the surgeon Thomas Bond, on 9 April 1896 at Christ Church, Broadway, Westminster. There were three sons (one, Captain Geoffrey Sebastian Buck, was killed in World War I, aged 21) and two daughters. In the 1911 census their address was listed as 100 High Street, Harrow-on-the-Hill. During his time at Harrow (from 1912) Buck began a clandestine and long-term (17 year) relationship with Sylvia Townsend Warner, whose father was a History master at the school. He was 41, she was 19. From 1917 Warner, who was to pursue a career as a poet and novelist after the publication of her first novel, Lolly Willowes in 1926, also worked with Buck as one of the editors of Tudor Church Music.

His wife Lucy died in 1940, aged 68. The same year Buck's papers and music were destroyed by an incendiary bomb in Harrow. Also destroyed was the typescript of a book - Psychology for Musicians - that he had completed before the war and put aside for later publication. He set about re-writing it from memory. It was eventually published in 1944.

Percy Buck died, aged 76, at the Stoneycrest Nursing Home in Hindhead, Surrey, after a short illness.

== Works ==
=== Musical compositions ===
Buck's compositions include a piano quintet (Op. 17), a string quintet (Op. 19), a violin sonata (Op. 21), and a piano quartet (Op. 22). These were all unpublished, and many of his early manuscripts were later destroyed in World War II during an air raid. The three organ sonatas - Op. 3 (1896), Op. 9 (1902) and Op. 12 (1904) were published in Leipzig and so survived, along with some piano works and songs. The orchestral work Croon, in the style of an Irish lullaby, was performed at The Proms in September 1917. There was also an orchestral overture, Coeur de Lion Op. 18.

Buck composed a number of hymn tunes - fourteen of them were included in the 1916 edition of Hymns Ancient and Modern - most notably Gonfalon Royal, written in 1913 as a setting for the Christian hymn "The Royal Banners Forward Go", to be sung at Harrow School (Gonfalon is a Norman word for a banner). His Songs of the Holy Child, a collection of nine choral pieces, has been recorded by the Sheldon Consort, along with other anthems and the organ chorale prelude In Dulci Jubilo, performed by David Bednall.

=== Writings ===
He is possibly best remembered today for his writing and editing. He edited The English Psalter (London, 1925) with Charles Macpherson. The Oxford Song Book of English national and folk songs for schools was issued in 1929, followed by The Oxford Nursery Song Book in 1934. His books include The Scope of Music (1924, derived from the Cramb lectures he delivered in Glasgow the previous year), and Psychology for Musicians (1944), written long before the subject became fashionable in the 1960s. He was on the editorial board for OUP's Tudor Church Music and revised the first two volumes of the Oxford History of Music (1929 and 1932), also contributing a new introductory volume (1929).

- The Organ: a Complete Method for the Study of Technique and Style (London, 1909)
- Unfigured Harmony (Oxford, 1911)
- Organ Playing (London, 1912)
- The First Year at the Organ (London, 1913)
- Acoustics for Musicians (Oxford, 1918)
- The Scope of Music (Oxford, 1924)
- A History of Music (London, 1929)
- The Oxford Song Book Volume 1 (1929)
- The Oxford Nursery Song Book (Oxford, 1933)
- Psychology for Musicians (London, 1944)

Cultural offices
Preceded by Charles Lavington	Organist and Master of the Choristers of Wells Cathedral; 1896–1899	Succeeded by Revd. Canon Thomas Henry Davis
Preceded by George Riseley	Organist and Master of the Choristers, Bristol Cathedral; 1899–1901	Succeeded by Hubert Hunt
