= Edward Dannreuther =

German pianist and writer (1844–1905)

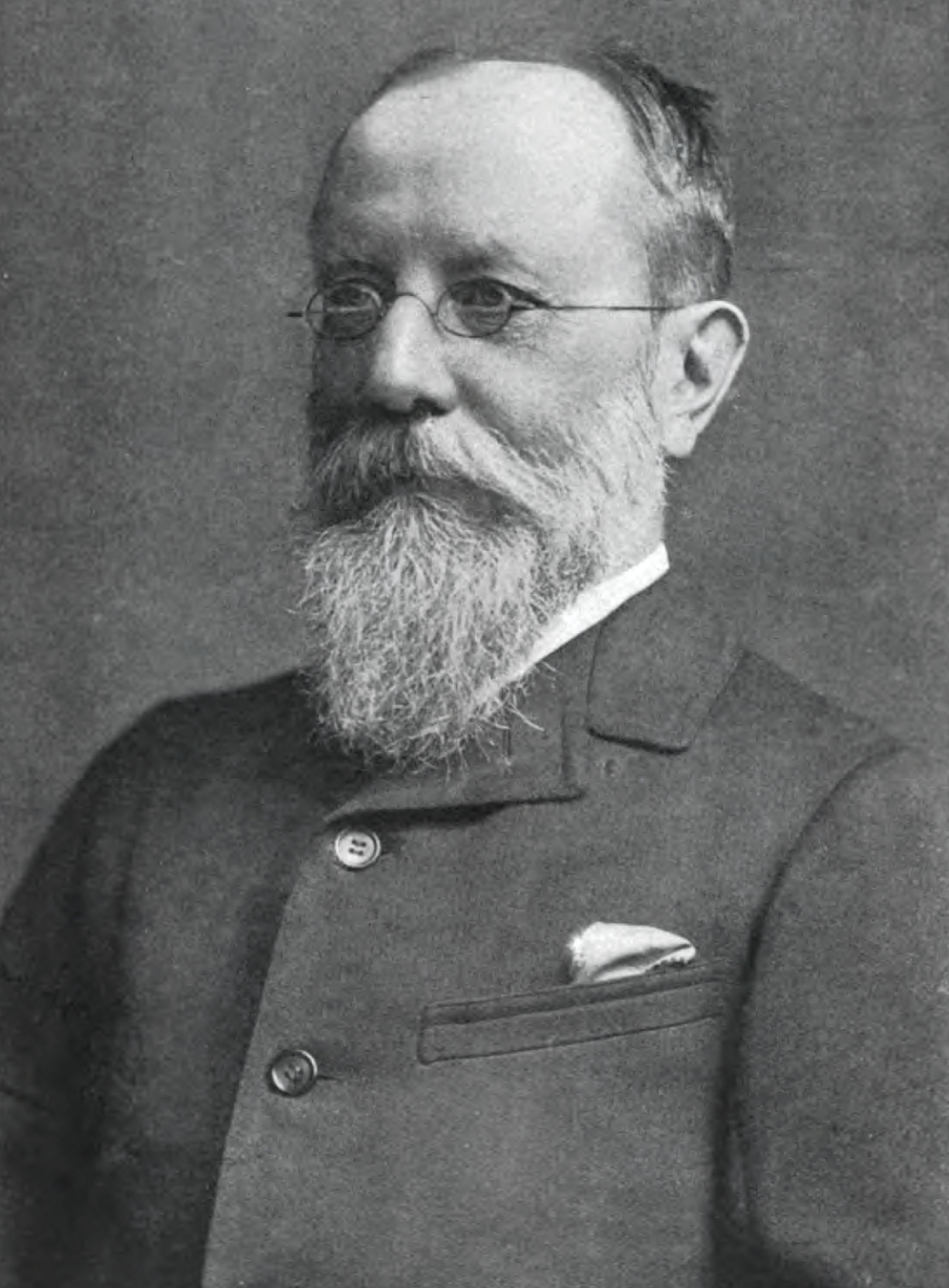
Dannreuther, 1898

Edward George Dannreuther (4 November 1844, in Strasbourg – 12 February 1905, in Hastings) was a pianist and writer on music, resident from 1863 in England.

== Life and career ==
His father had crossed the Atlantic, moving to Cincinnati, and there established a piano manufacturing business. Young Edward, under pressure from his father to enter banking as a career, a prospect he found uncongenial, escaped to Leipzig in 1859.

He trained as a musician at the Leipzig Conservatoire, where he was a pupil of Ignaz Moscheles. A youthful champion of composer Richard Wagner, he founded the London Wagner Society in 1872. In 1863 he had been recruited by Henry Chorley to play the piano in London at the Crystal Palace Concerts. His performances of Chopin and Beethoven were well received; after his marriage in 1871 he decided to settle permanently in England. His two-volume work Musical Ornamentation was for many years the standard text, and an important influence on the evolving trend of performance practice.

Dannreuther became a professor of piano at the Royal College of Music in 1895, a position he held until his death. An enthusiast for new music, he was an important influence on the composer Hubert Parry, who was his pupil. A memorial plaque on his former home at 12 Orme Square, Westminster, London was unveiled on 26 July 2005.

His son Hubert Edward Dannreuther (1880–1977) was a British admiral and one of six survivors of the sinking of HMS Invincible. Another son Tristan Dannreuther (1872–1963) also served as an officer in the Royal Navy, and was an Assistant Director of Naval Intelligence after World War I.

== Selected writings ==
- Dannreuther, Edward (1905). Hadow, William Henry (ed.). The Romantic Period. Oxford History of Music. Vol. 6. Oxford: Oxford University Press. OCLC 1210347.
