= John Alexander Fuller Maitland =

British music critic (1856–1936)

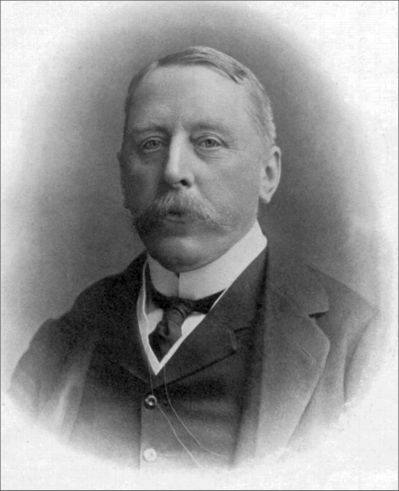
Fuller Maitland, c. 1910

John Alexander Fuller Maitland (7 April 1856 – 30 March 1936) was an influential British music critic and scholar from the 1880s to the 1920s. He encouraged the rediscovery of English music of the 16th and 17th centuries, particularly Henry Purcell's music and English virginal music. He also propounded the notion of an English Musical Renaissance in the second half of the 19th century, particularly praising Charles Villiers Stanford and Hubert Parry.

Fuller Maitland was criticised for his failure to acknowledge the talents of the English composers Arthur Sullivan, Edward Elgar and Frederick Delius, and later it was shown that he had falsified the facts in a critique of Sullivan. He was also slow to recognise the worth of contemporary composers from mainland Europe such as Claude Debussy and Richard Strauss.

== Biography ==
Fuller Maitland was born at 90 Gloucester Place, Portman Square, London, the son of John Fuller Maitland and his wife Marianne (née Noble). He attended Westminster School for three terms, but for most of his childhood he was educated privately, including musical instruction. Starting in 1875, he studied at Trinity College, Cambridge, where he was active in the Cambridge University Musical Society. There he became friends with Charles Villiers Stanford and William Barclay Squire, whose sister Charlotte he married in 1885. He had intended to follow a career in the Church of England but decided to instead to pursue a career in music. After leaving Cambridge he studied the piano with Edward Dannreuther and other aspects of music with W. S. Rockstro, who encouraged him to explore early polyphonic music.

=== Music journalism ===
Fuller Maitland became a musical journalist, as a critic for the Pall Mall Gazette from 1882, later for The Guardian (1884–89) and The Times (1889–1911). He also wrote many entries for Grove's Dictionary of Music and Musicians and was appointed editor of the second edition. A later editor of the Dictionary wrote of him, "In particular, he added an important and substantial series of articles on medieval liturgical subjects … [he] was quite traditional in his own interests: he wrote a great deal on Bach and on the more conservative German music of the 19th century, and, as an active editor of the earlier music of his own country – the complete Purcell edition, English virginal music, and (again a child of his times) English folksong – he was in the mainstream of the scholarly activity of his day." More than a hundred of his articles survive, in revised form, in the online version of Grove available in 2010.

In pioneering the revival of the virginals, Fuller Maitland published an edition of the Fitzwilliam Virginal Book (1894–99). He was a member of the editorial committee of the Purcell Society, for which he edited several of Purcell's works. With his relative Lucy Broadwood, he edited the collection English County Songs (1893), and he was on the original committee of the Folk Song Society, founded in 1898. He socialized with contralto, composer, and music festival organizer Mary Augusta Wakefield.

=== Reputation as a critic ===
At a time when music lovers generally admired either Richard Wagner or Johannes Brahms but not both, Fuller Maitland, according to the obituary notice in The Times, "worshipped" both Wagner and Brahms. As regards English music, he was the principal exponent of the doctrine that music had long been moribund in England until the second half of the 19th century when, he maintained, it experienced a renaissance led by his favoured composers. His book English Music in the XIXth Century is subdivided into two parts: "Book I: Before the Renaissance (1801–1850)", and "Book II: The Renaissance (1851–1900)". He used the phrase "English music" to include that of the Irish Stanford, whom, together with Hubert Parry, Fuller Maitland regarded as leading the "English musical renaissance". Stanford and Parry were both upper-middle-class Oxbridge graduates, like Fuller Maitland, and both were professors at music colleges. The writer Meirion Hughes describes Fuller Maitland's world as one of insiders and outsiders. Fuller Maitland rejected British composers who did not conform to his template. "Sullivan's frequent forays into what was viewed as the questionable realm of operetta removed him from the equation at once. Elgar was never a contender, with his unacademic, lower-middle-class background coupled with progressive tendencies, while "Fritz" Delius was simply not English enough." The same writer suggests that Fuller Maitland's aversion to Sir Frederic Cowen was due to anti-Semitism.

Fuller Maitland's integrity as a critic came under scrutiny, notably by Elgar in a lecture in 1905. Fuller Maitland had published a denigrating obituary of Sullivan in the Cornhill Magazine, which Elgar alluded to as "the shady side of musical criticism … this foul, unforgettable episode." Later, it was shown that Fuller Maitland had falsified the facts, inventing a banal lyric, passing it off as genuine and condemning Sullivan for supposedly setting such inanity.

=== Later years ===
Fuller Maitland gave up journalism in 1911, retiring to Borwick Hall near Carnforth in Lancashire. He continued to write books, including an autobiography, A Door-Keeper of Music (1929), in which he admitted that he had been wrong in earlier years to dismiss Sullivan's comic operas as "ephemeral". His aversion to modern music abated in his later years, and he recognised the importance of composers such as Richard Strauss and Claude Debussy. He received an honorary DLitt from Durham University in 1928.

Fuller Maitland's wife died in 1931. There were no children of the marriage. He died at Borwick Hall at the age of 79. His personal fortune was assessed at £38,477 (equivalent to about £2 million in 2010).

== Publications ==
Fuller Maitland published the following books:

- 1884: Life of Robert Schumann
- 1889: Grove's Dictionary of Music & Musicians (appendix – ed.)
- 1893: English County Songs (ed. with Lucy E. Broadwood)
- 1894: Masters of German Music
- 1899: The Fitzwilliam Virginal Book (ed. with William Barclay Squire)
- 1899: The Musician's Pilgrimage
- 1902: English Music in the XIXth Century
- 1902: The Age of Bach & Handel (Oxford History of Music)
- 1904–1910: Grove's Dictionary of Music & Musicians (2nd edition) (ed)
- 1905: Joseph Joachim
- 1911: Brahms
- 1915: The Consort of Music
- 1921: Arthur Coleridge: Reminiscences
- 1926: The Spell of Music
- 1929: A Doorkeeper of Music
- 1931: John Lucas's History of Warton Parish (ed. with J. Rawlinson Ford)
- 1934: The Music of Stanford and Parry
