= William Henry Hadow =

British educational reformer, musicologist and composer (1859 - 1937)

Sir William Henry Hadow CBE

Vice-Chancellor of Durham University
- In office 1916–1918
- Preceded by: Henry Gee
- Succeeded by: John Stapylton Grey Pemberton

Vice-Chancellor of the University of Sheffield
- In office 1919–1930
- Preceded by: William Ripper
- Succeeded by: Arthur Wallace Pickard-Cambridge

Personal details
- Born: 27 December 1859 Ebrington, England
- Died: 8 April 1937 (aged 77)
- Spouse: Edith Troutbeck (m. 1930; died 1937)
- Education: Worcester College, Oxford
- Profession: Educationalist; musicologist

Sir William Henry Hadow CBE (27 December 1859 – 8 April 1937) British educational reformer, musicologist and composer. He edited many volumes of the original Oxford History of Music series.

== Life ==
Born at Ebrington in Gloucestershire and baptised there on 29 January 1860 by his father, he was the eldest child of the Reverend William Elliot Hadow (1826–1906) and his wife Mary Lang Cornish (1835–1917). His grandfather, the Reverend William Thomas Hadow, had married Eleanor Ann Bethune, daughter of Colonel John Drinkwater Bethune.

He studied at Malvern College, followed by Worcester College, Oxford, where he taught and became Dean (1889). In 1905, Hadow was elected the first Old Malvernian member of the Council of Malvern College. In 1909, he was appointed principal of Armstrong College in the Newcastle Division of Durham University before succeeding, as Warden and vice-chancellor of the University of Durham in 1916. In 1919, he was appointed the Vice-Chancellor of Sheffield University (1919–30).

As chairman of several committees, he published a series of reports on education, notably The Education of the Adolescent (1926). This called for the re-organization of elementary education and the abandonment of all-age schools (i.e. separate schools from the age of 11, instead of the existing schools, both state and voluntary (i.e. associated with a particular religious denomination), which often educated children up to the age of 14, the school leaving age under the Education Act 1918), and the creation of secondary modern schools for children over the age of 11. These became known as the Hadow Reports. He was a leading influence in English education at all levels in the 1920s and 1930s. He chaired a committee, established in 1926 jointly by the British Broadcasting Company (later BBC) and the British Institute of Adult Education, to report on the possibilities of using radio broadcasting for education. The results were published as a book, "New Ventures in Broadcasting - A Study in Adult Education".

Hadow wrote and edited a number of publications on literature, music and music theory. He took on the general editorship of the original six-volume edition of the Oxford History of Music between 1901 and 1905, writing the fifth volume (covering the period from C.P.E. Bach to Schubert) himself. With his younger sister Grace Hadow he edited The Oxford Treasury of English Literature (1907–8).

He was also a composer, mostly of chamber-works between 1892 and 1897. Many of these have now been lost (including the 1889 Violin Sonata in Ab, the Piano Trio in G minor and the Violin Sonata in A minor), but two were published: his Piano Sonata in G-sharp minor by Augener in 1885, and his String Quartet by Novello in 1886. Manuscript copies of the Violin Sonata in F major (1891) and his last chamber work, the Clarinet Sonata of 1897, have survived. Some songs and incidental music followed the Clarinet Sonata, but nothing after 1912. In 1917 he delivered the Master-Mind Lecture, on Beethoven.

Hadow was awarded a Knight Bachelor in 1918 and a CBE in 1920. He was also a Member of the Council of the Royal College of Music

Hadow's grave in Brookwood Cemetery in 2018

In 1930 in London, when he was 70 years old, he married a long-standing friend, Edith Troutbeck (1863-1937), daughter of the musicologist and translator John Troutbeck. She died a few weeks before his own death in Westminster, London. They are buried in Brookwood Cemetery in Surrey.

== Publications ==
- Studies in Modern Music (Berlioz, Schumann and Wagner)(1893) Seeley and Co. Limited, London
- Studies in Modern Music Second Series (Chopin, Dvorak and Brahms) (1895) Seeley and Co. Limited, London
- Sonata Form (1896) Novello, Ewer & Co
- A Croatian Composer. Notes toward the Study of Joseph Haydn (1897) Seeley and Co. Limited, London
- The Oxford History of Music, Volume 5: The Viennese Period (1904)
- William Byrd 1623-1923 (1920) Humphrey Milford, London
- Citizenship (1923) Oxford at the Clarendon Press
- Music (1925) Williams and Norgate Ltd, England
- A Comparison of Poetry and Music (1926) Cambridge University Press
- The Education of the Adolescent (1926)
- Beethoven's Opus Eighteen Quartets (1927)
- Collected Essays (1928) Oxford University Press (ed. Hubert Foss)
- English Music (1931) Longmans Green & Co, London

Academic offices
Preceded by The Revd Henry Gee	Vice-Chancellor & Warden of the University of Durham; 1916–1918	Succeeded by John Stapylton Grey Pemberton
Preceded by William Ripper	Vice-Chancellor of the University of Sheffield; 1919–1930	Succeeded by Arthur Wallace Pickard-Cambridge
