= Attewell =

Attewell is a surname. Notable people with the surname include:

- Bill Attewell, Canadian politician
- David Attewell, English basketball player
- Humphrey Attewell, British Trade unionist
- Len Attewell, Welsh international rugby union player
- Steven Attewell, American author, policy historian, and blogger
- Thomas Attewell, English cricketer
- Walter Attewell, English cricketer
- William Attewell, English cricketer
