= Neville Cardus =

English writer (1888–1975)

Sir Neville Cardus CBE
- Neville Cardus, pictured in old age
- Born: John Frederick Neville Cardus; 2 April 1888; Rusholme, Manchester, England
- Died: 28 February 1975 (aged 86); London, England
- Education: Board School
- Occupations: Writer; Critic
- Spouse: Edith Honorine Walton King (died 1968)
- Writing career
- Period: 1912–1975
- Genres: Musical criticism; Descriptive cricket reporting
- Notable works: For The Manchester Guardian: chief cricket correspondent 1919–39 chief music critic 1927–40; London music critic, 1951–75

Sir John Frederick Neville Cardus CBE (2 April 1888 – 28 February 1975) was an English writer and critic. From an impoverished home background, and mainly self-educated, he became The Manchester Guardian's cricket correspondent in 1919 and its chief music critic in 1927, holding the two posts simultaneously until 1940. His contributions to these two distinct fields in the years before the Second World War established his reputation as one of the foremost critics of his generation.

Cardus's approach to cricket writing was innovative, turning what had previously been largely a factual form into vivid description and criticism; he is considered by contemporaries to have influenced every subsequent cricket writer. Although he achieved his largest readership for his cricket reports and books, he considered music criticism as his principal vocation. Without any formal musical training, he was initially influenced by the older generation of critics, in particular Samuel Langford and Ernest Newman, but developed his own individual style of criticism—subjective, romantic and personal, in contrast to the objective analysis practised by Newman. Cardus's opinions and judgments were often forthright and unsparing, which sometimes caused friction with leading performers. Nevertheless, his personal charm and gregarious manner enabled him to form lasting friendships in the cricketing and musical worlds, with among others Newman, Sir Thomas Beecham and Sir Donald Bradman.

Cardus spent the Second World War years in Australia, where he wrote for The Sydney Morning Herald and gave regular radio talks. He also wrote books on music, and completed his autobiography. After his return to England he resumed his connection with The Manchester Guardian as its London music critic. He continued to write on cricket, and produced books on both his specialisms. Cardus's work was publicly recognised by his appointment as a Commander of the Order of the British Empire (CBE) in 1964 and the award of a knighthood in 1967, while the music and cricket worlds acknowledged him with numerous honours. In his last years, he became a guru and inspirational figure to aspiring young writers.

== Early life ==
=== Family background and early childhood ===
Neville Cardus was born on 2 April 1888 in Rusholme, Manchester. Throughout his childhood and young adulthood he was known as "Fred". There has been confusion over his birth date. The birthdate of 2 April 1888 is as given on his baptism record; and it is 2 April when he celebrated his birthday, albeit believing that he was born in 1889: Cardus himself hosted a dinner party on 2 April 1959 believing this to be his 70th birthday. His birth certificate shows a birthdate of 3 April 1888, but this has been argued to be incorrect, since the date of registration of 15 May 1888 was such that using the birth date of 2 April would have breached the requirement to register a birth in no more than 42 days. Some sources give the birthdate as 2 April 1889, (Note: The research by O'Brien in Cardus Uncovered, p. 23-25, sets out the reasoning for the birthdate of 2 April 1888. Both Cardus's Who's Who entry, and Brookes's 1985 biography, give 2 April 1889 as the birth date; the Oxford Dictionary of National Biography, and Robin Daniels's 2009 memoir, give the date shown on the birth certificate.) Neville's mother was Ada Cardus, one of six daughters of Robert and Ann Cardus of 4 Summer Place, Rusholme. On 14 July 1888, when the baby was three months old, Ada married Neville's father, John Frederick Newsham, a blacksmith. Cardus's autobiographical works refer to his father as a violinist in an orchestra, but there is no other evidence for this. Four days after the wedding, Cardus's father left by boat for America, with the intention that Ada follow. However, Ada changed her mind and went to live with Eliahoo Joseph, a Turkish merchant and possibly a pimp, with Ada a prostitute. John Frederick Newsham returned to England and divorced Ada in 1899. It was said that within a few years Ada and Neville had returned to her parents' home in Summer Place.

Robert Cardus was a retired policeman; Neville referred to him as receiving a small pension, although a search of police archives found no trace of this. The family took in neighbours' washing, and the household income was further supplemented by his daughters' earnings from part-time prostitution. In his autobiographical writings, Cardus refers to his home environment at Summer Place as "sordid ... unlettered and unbeautiful", yet enlivened by laughter: "Humour kept breezing in". Commentators have suggested that Cardus tended to overstate the deprived aspects of his childhood; his biographer Christopher Brookes asserts that "Cardus was the product neither of a slum, nor a cultural desert". Robert Cardus, though uneducated, was not illiterate, and was instrumental in awakening his grandson's literary interests. Theatres, libraries and other cultural facilities were easily accessible from the Cardus home.

Neville described his formal schooling as limited to five years at the local board school, where the curriculum was basic and the methods of tuition harsh: "[T]he boy who showed the faintest sign of freedom of the will was caned". There is, however, doubt as to whether his schooling lasted only five years and whether he attended a board school or a Church of England school. The experience did not curb Neville's intellectual curiosity; at a very young age he was expanding his cultural horizons, through the worlds of reading and of music hall and pantomime. When he was 10 years old he discovered the novels of Dickens; years later he wrote that there were two classes of person, "those who have it in them from birth onwards to appreciate Dickens and those who haven't. The second group should be avoided as soon as detected". His earliest creative writing took the form of a handwritten magazine, The Boy's World, full of articles and stories he had written. He circulated it among his schoolmates, until it was discovered and torn up by an irate teacher.

=== Manchester, 1901–12 ===
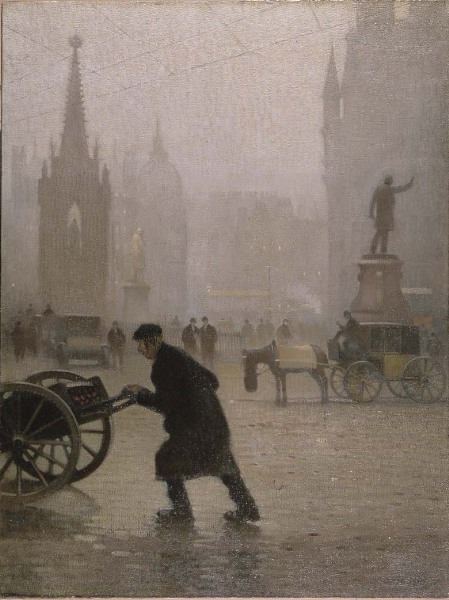
Albert Square, Manchester (depicted in 1910 by Adolphe Valette), where Cardus and his self-educated friends met regularly for discussion and debate

After Robert Cardus's death in 1900 the family moved several times, eventually breaking up altogether. Cardus left school in 1901 and took a variety of short-term, unskilled jobs before finding more secure employment as a clerk with Flemings' marine insurance agency. He lived for a time with his Aunt Beatrice with whom, according to Brookes, he had at an early age "embarked on a lifelong love affair ... In his eyes she could do no wrong". A flamboyant character, Beatrice brought colour into Cardus's life; she encouraged him to read worthwhile books and her memory, Brookes asserts, "remained a potent inspirational force" throughout his later life as a writer. She also bought him his first cricket bat.

These years were a period of intense self-education. Cardus became an habitué of the local libraries, and extended his reading from Dickens to include many of the masters of literature: Fielding, Thackeray, Conrad and—with more reservation—Hardy and Henry James. In due course he added philosophy and metaphysics to his curriculum; this began with his discovery of George Henry Lewes, which led him on to the works of Kant, Hume, Berkeley and, eventually, Schopenhauer. He supplemented these studies by attending free lectures at Manchester University, and met regularly with a group of like-minded autodidacts at Alexandra Park or, in the winter, at the Lyons café in Albert Square, to discuss and debate for whole afternoons. At first Cardus's schedule of self-improvement was random; eventually he compiled what he called a "cultural scheme" whereby he devoted a set weekly number of hours to different subjects.

Victor Trumper, whose batting was placed among "all the delights I have known" (Autobiography)

Cardus's interest in music began with the popular tunes sung by his mother and her sisters in the family home. He remembered hearing for the first time the melody of the "Vilja" song from Franz Lehár's operetta The Merry Widow, which "curled its way into my heart to stay there for a lifetime". In April 1907 he was "swept ... into the seven seas of music" by a performance of Edward German's operetta Tom Jones. "I am unable to explain", Cardus wrote many years later, "why it should have been left to Edward German—of all composers—to release the flood". He began going to the Hallé Orchestra's concerts at the Free Trade Hall where, on 3 December 1908, he was present at the premiere of Elgar's first symphony, under Hans Richter. He regularly attended the fortnightly concerts at the Royal Manchester College of Music, where students' performances were assessed by the principal, Adolph Brodsky. As part of his scheme of study, Cardus briefly took singing lessons, his only formal instruction in music. In 1916 Cardus published his first musical article, "Bantock and Style in Music", in Musical Opinion. (Note: Cardus incorrectly dates this article to 1910: "It was written in the scholarly manner of the rationalist school presided over by J. M. Robertson and [Ernest] Newman. It contained footnotes, and was copious with allusions".)

Alongside his intellectual pursuits Cardus played and followed cricket. As a small boy he had begun to visit Old Trafford Cricket Ground to watch Lancashire matches: "The first cricketer I saw was A.C. MacLaren ... I can still see the swing of MacLaren's bat, the great follow-through finishing high and held there with the body poised". In 1902 he saw the Test match against Australia in which Victor Trumper scored a century before lunch and thereby won a permanent place among Cardus's heroes. Cardus first played cricket on rough waste land close to his home in Rusholme; as he matured he developed as an effective medium-paced off break bowler, and for several seasons from 1908 onwards he played as a weekend professional in Manchester league cricket. "I am not ashamed to confess that I seldom hesitated, as soon as a batsman came to the crease, to let him have a quick one bang in the penis; after which a quick, simple straight one would invariably remove him from the scene".

== Shrewsbury ==
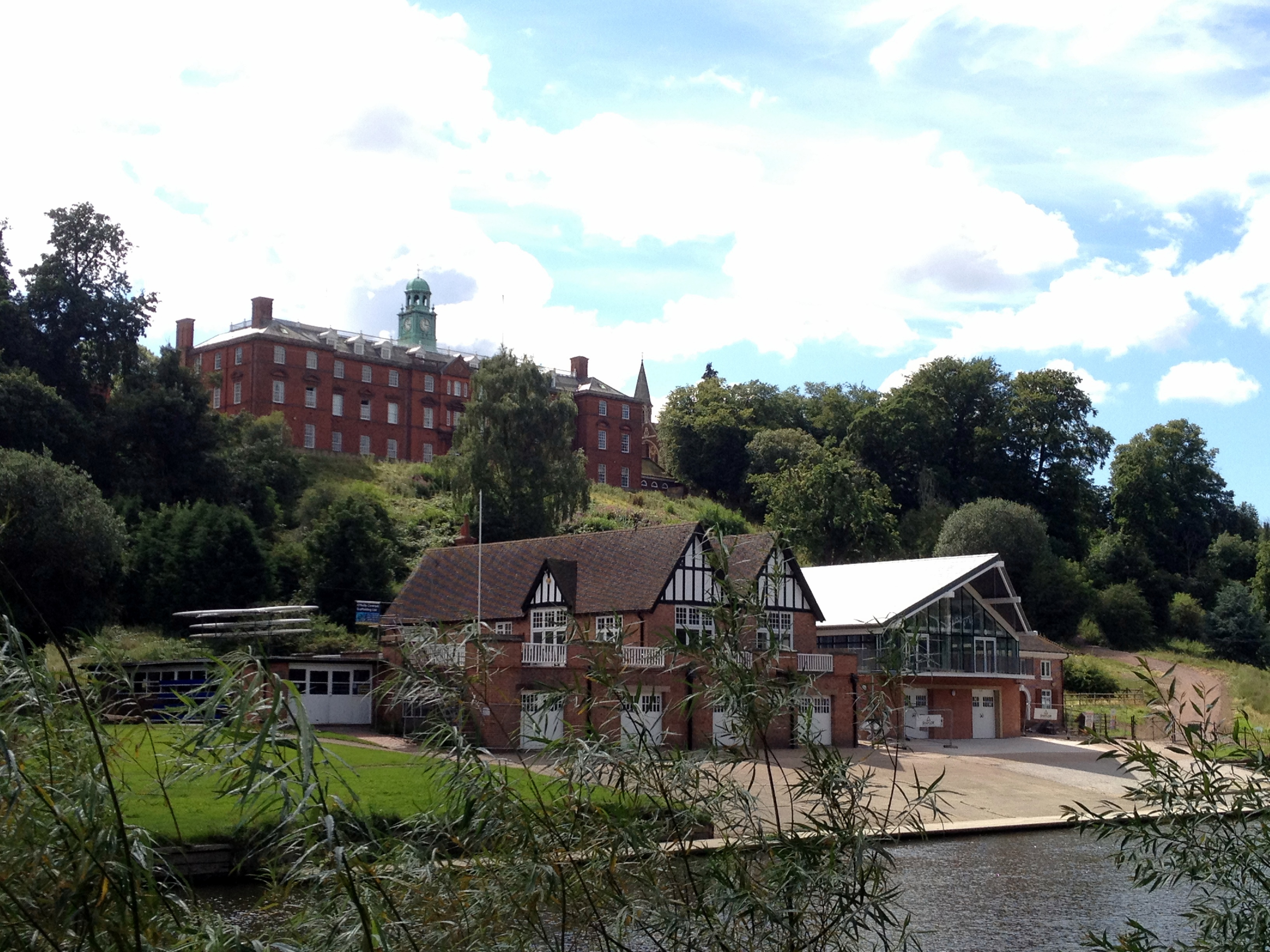
Shrewsbury School, seen from the River Severn

In the spring of 1912, in search of a change from his unrewarding clerical job, Cardus applied for the post of assistant cricket coach at Shrewsbury School, citing his bowling averages in Manchester club cricket. He reasoned that, by living frugally during the Shrewsbury summers, he would be able to finance his winter studies of music and literature. His application was successful, and in May 1912 he began his duties. He worked initially under Walter Attewell, a former Nottinghamshire professional, (Note: There has been confusion as to the identity of "Attewell". In Autobiography, Cardus names him as William Attewell, a star bowler for Nottinghamshire who played 10 Test matches for England between 1884 and 1892. However, in Who's Who of Cricketers, the Shrewsbury coach is identified as William's cousin Walter Attewell, who played a single match for Nottinghamshire in 1891 and otherwise worked as a travelling cricket coach, for several years in the United States. Daniel's memoir names William, while Brookes is inexplicit; O'Brien's biography confirms that the coach was Walter Attewell.) and later under the Yorkshire and England cricketer Ted Wainwright. Cardus established good working relations with both of these, but identified most closely with Cyril Alington, the school's headmaster: "Because of Alington I call myself ... an old Salopian". Alington first detected Cardus's intellectual potential when he found him reading a copy of Gilbert Murray's translation of Euripides's drama Medea. In August 1914, in addition to his cricketing duties he became Alington's secretary, after the previous incumbent joined the army at the outbreak of war; Cardus was rejected for military service because of his poor eyesight.

Cyril Alington in 1908

Cardus did not find his duties at Shrewsbury onerous. He made frequent trips to Manchester, for Hallé concerts or to watch Thomas Beecham conduct at the Manchester Opera House. He found time for other work; thus, in the winter of 1913–14, he was the music critic for the northern edition of The Daily Citizen. This short-lived newspaper was an official organ of the early Labour Party; mainly out of admiration for Bernard Shaw Cardus had joined the Independent Labour Party, but quickly lost interest in socialism: "Their creed or system was obviously not to be a means to an end but an end in itself". According to Brookes, the influence of Shrewsbury School affected Cardus to the extent that "[t]he playing fields of an English public school were for him a more natural setting than the iconoclastic frenzy of the Lyons café where socialism vied with Richard Strauss for pride of place in the race to modernity". The Daily Citizen paid poorly, and Cardus's association with it ended in April 1914. (Note: In his autobiography, Cardus dates his time with The Daily Citizen to 1916–17, after the end of his Shrewsbury years. Other sources date the experience to 1913; O'Brien documents his contributions to the paper, finishing in April 1914.The Daily Citizen closed down in June 1915.)

Cardus spent his winters in Manchester, studying hard in anticipation of any opportunity for an opening as a music critic, eking out his summer savings by taking temporary clerical work. Around 1916 he met Edith King, an art teacher and amateur actress who became a regular attender at the Lyons café meetings. In the summers, when Cardus returned to Shrewsbury, she kept him informed of musical and cultural events in Manchester. The Shrewsbury years, which Brookes describes as a "magical interlude", ended suddenly when, at the end of the 1916 summer, Alington was appointed headmaster of Eton. Initially it seemed likely that Cardus would join him there as his secretary, but Cardus's military exemption was under review; the uncertainty of his position ended the possibility of a post at Eton. He left Shrewsbury in September 1916 with little money, and no immediate prospects of regular work.

== Manchester Guardian, 1917–1940 ==
=== First years ===
C. P. Scott, editor of The Manchester Guardian from 1872 to 1929

In the winter of 1916–17 Cardus continued his private studies while working intermittently; among various jobs, he collected insurance premiums for a burial society. Early in January 1917 he wrote to C. P. Scott, The Manchester Guardian's editor, asking for any available post at the paper, as "the means whereby to continue my education". To bolster his chances he enclosed specimens of his writing. The result was, first, a temporary unpaid position as Scott's secretary, but in mid-March Scott offered a job on the paper's reporting staff. The writer J. B. Priestley later asserted that Cardus, who did not know shorthand, was engaged not as a reporter, but as a "writer". In Cardus's own account of these years he appears to have been fully engaged in reporters' duties, his lack of shorthand being dismissed by the chief reporter, Haslam Mills, who paraphrased Shakespeare: "Some men are born to shorthand, others achieve shorthand, while others have shorthand thrust upon them". (Note: "Some men are born great, some achieve greatness, and some have greatness thrust upon them". From Twelfth Night, Act 2 scene 5.) Mills advised Cardus to concentrate on style: "We can be decorative at times; we can even be amusing. Here, possibly, you will find scope."

Within a year Cardus had been moved from the reporters' room to take charge of the paper's "Miscellany" column. He also resumed the duties of part-time secretary to Scott, who was at this time over 70, and had edited The Manchester Guardian since 1872. Despite his years, he struck Cardus as "of inexhaustible energy and aliveness". Scott was a demanding employer, who gave his young writers free rein, but expected in return long hours and total dedication. Driven hard, sometimes to the point of exhaustion, Cardus nevertheless relished these years, and never complained to Scott of weariness. Early in 1919 his role changed again, when he was made junior drama critic under the direction of C.E. Montague, the paper's principal theatre critic who had returned from war service with no great desire to continue in the role. Cardus's principal ambitions still lay in the direction of music criticism, though he recognised that this door was closed while Samuel Langford, music critic since 1906, remained in post. In preparation for any opportunity that might arise in that direction, Cardus maintained a daily two-hour study of music or music literature.

=== Cricket correspondent ===
Flight was his secret, flight and the curving line, now higher, now lower, tempting, inimical; every ball like every other ball, yet somehow unlike; each over in collusion with the others, part of a plot. Every ball a decoy, a spy sent out to get the lie of the land; some balls simple, some complex, some easy, some difficult; and one of them—ah, which?—the master ball.

— Cardus, in his Autobiography, writing of Wilfred Rhodes

In the spring of 1919, while recovering from a serious pulmonary condition, Cardus took up a suggestion from his news editor, William Percival Crozier, that he should watch some cricket at Old Trafford and, if he felt able, write reports on a few matches. He had earlier written four articles on cricket for the newspaper. On 19 May 1919 Cardus went to the first day of Lancashire's match with Derbyshire. His first published cricket report, on the following day, showed little sign of his later characteristic style: "I simply had no intention of writing on cricket for any length of time; this was a spare-time affair ... and I fitted myself into the idioms and procedures of the sporting writers of 1919". Scott nonetheless saw a potential, and from the beginning of 1920 Cardus became the paper's regular cricket correspondent, under the by-line "Cricketer", a position he held for 20 years.

Cardus's emergence as cricket correspondent was concurrent with another appointment, that of deputy and successor designate to Langford as music critic. In January 1920 Cardus reported on two recitals by the Russian tenor Vladimir Rosing, and apparently impressed Scott with the quality of his notice, although the accuracy of Cardus's summary of events has been questioned. With the succession to Langford assured, and a significant increase in salary, Cardus was happy to devote his summers exclusively to cricket. He remained circumspect about his commitment to the sport: "Never have I regarded my cricket as more than a means to an end; that end being always music". Nevertheless, he developed a style of cricket reporting that quickly lifted him to the forefront of contemporary sports writers. He did this, according to his fellow cricket writer Gerald Howat, by using imagery and metaphor to create "a mythology of characters and scenes". John Arlott described Cardus as "the creat[or] of modern cricket writing".

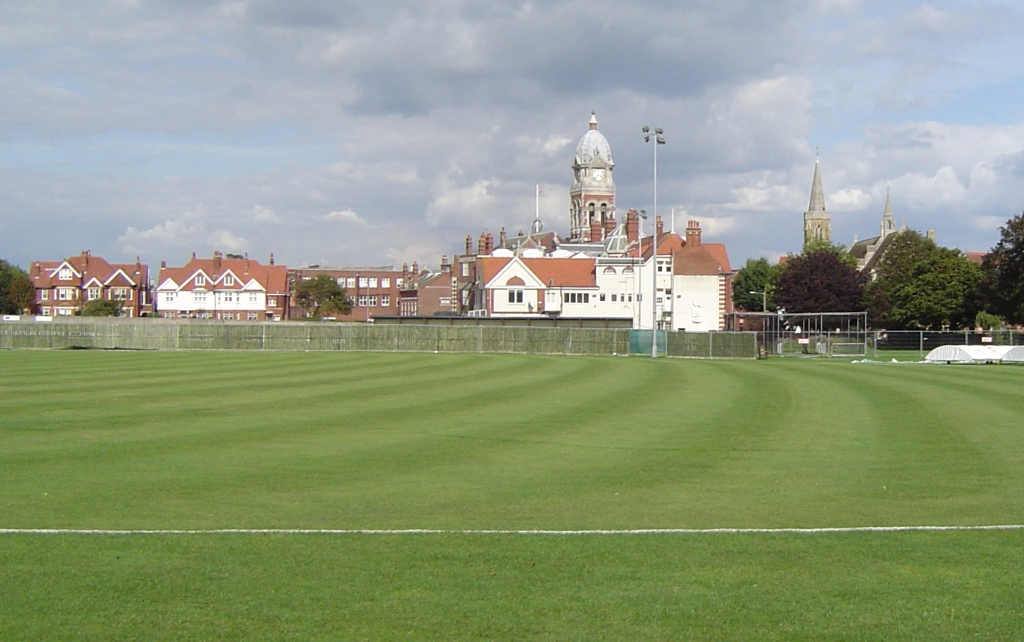
The Saffrons, Eastbourne (2007 photograph), scene of Cardus's "scoop", August 1921

The new sense of financial and professional security was probably instrumental in the decision of Cardus and Edith King to marry, on 17 June 1921. The marriage, which lasted until Edith's death 47 years later, was unconventional; the couple led individual lives and rarely lived together, while remaining devoted friends. Cardus described his wife as "a great spirit and character, born for sisterhood not marriage." From this time onward, Cardus used the forename "Neville" in place of "Fred", and adopted the initials "N.C." for his music reviews, to distinguish this persona from "Cricketer". (Note: According to O'Brien, Cardus had earlier used the name "J. F. Neville Cardus" for his 1916 Musical Opinion article.) In August 1921 Cardus gained what he termed "the only scoop of my career", when he reported the unexpected victory by 28 runs of MacLaren's scratch side over the previously unbeaten Australian touring team. The match, at The Saffrons ground at Eastbourne, had attracted little interest from other cricket correspondents, being treated as a foregone conclusion.

The focus of much of Cardus's cricket writing was the Lancashire side of the inter-war years, and in particular their twice-yearly battles with rivals Yorkshire. His eye was as much on the players and their personalities as on the game, on "the match within the match", with the actual scores treated as secondary. Cardus justified this: "Do I add up the notes of a Mozart "Vivace" to evaluate the music?" To meet Cardus's requirements, the players were sometimes "enlarged", notably Emmott Robinson, the veteran Yorkshire all-rounder of the 1920s who through Cardus's pen became "the apotheosis of Yorkshire cricket and Yorkshire character". In the 1930s, Cardus's style became less effusive, as his older heroes were replaced by players with, in his view, less romantic appeal. Bradman was an exception; after his exploits in the England versus Australia Test series of 1930 Cardus described the Australian as "an incredible exponent who in himself sums up all the skill and experience that have gone before him ... he has kindled grand bonfires of batsmanship for us".

Selections from Cardus's Manchester Guardian cricket writings were published in a series of books between 1922 and 1937. Because of financial constraints the paper did not send "Cricketer" to Australia to cover the "Bodyline" tour of 1932–33. Cardus was generally approving of Jardine's controversial bodyline tactics, writing on 5 March 1933: "[H]ad [Jardine] been a weak man, all the energy of Larwood [England's premier bowler] might have proved as vain a thing as it did in 1930". In 1936–37, Cardus accompanied the MCC team to Australia; otherwise he continued to write on English domestic cricket until the 1939 season was summarily truncated. On 1 September, the day that Germany invaded Poland, Cardus observed the removal of the bust of W. G. Grace from the Lord's pavilion; he was informed by a bystander: "That means war". It has been argued that this should be regarded as a good story rather than literal truth: there was no match at Lord's that day, and Cardus was on holiday in Derbyshire.

=== Music critic ===
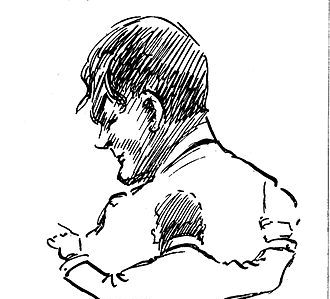
Sketch by an orchestra member of Hamilton Harty, chief conductor of the Hallé Orchestra, of whose performances Cardus was often critical

Following Langford's death in May 1927, Cardus became The Manchester Guardian's chief music critic. For several years he had worked closely with Langford, whose influence on the younger man was equalled only by that of Ernest Newman, Langford's predecessor as the paper's music critic: "Langford taught me to feel and translate, while Newman taught me to observe and analyse". Cardus's fellow-critic Hugo Cole has described his approach as personal rather than academic, based on his own reactions to the music he was hearing, and with a complete independence of judgement. Cardus was, Cole says, "the last distinguished music critic never to have received formal musical training ... he was a writer first, and a music critic second".

Cardus's lack of deference sometimes led to friction, as with Hamilton Harty, chief conductor of the Hallé Orchestra from 1920. In his reviews of the Hallé concerts until Harty's departure in 1933, Cardus frequently criticised the conductor's choices and interpretations. On one occasion he observed that Harty's rendering of the adagio in Beethoven's Ninth had broken the world record for slowness, and quoted minutes and seconds. Responding to Harty's outraged protests, Cardus threatened to bring an alarm clock to the next performance, "less for critical purposes than for those of personal convenience". When Harty left, he was not replaced as chief conductor; the Hallé employed distinguished visiting conductors such as Beecham, Malcolm Sargent, Pierre Monteux, Adrian Boult and Ernest Ansermet. Cardus considered that a lack of central direction was adversely affecting the orchestra, and his biting criticisms of some performances led to temporarily strained relations.

There was nothing pitiable in him, nothing inviting sympathy in this wreck of a physique. He was wrapped in a monk-like gown, and his face was strong and disdainful, every line on it graven by intrepid living.

— Cardus, writing of his meeting with Frederick Delius, October 1929.

Cardus often expressed views contrary to popular and critical opinion. He dismissed Stravinsky's The Rite of Spring as "a sophisticated exploitation of primitive rum-ti-tum". When Harty introduced Gershwin's symphonic poem An American in Paris into a Hallé concert, Cardus proposed "a 150 per cent [import] tariff against this sort of American dry-goods". He professed to think that Sullivan's "preoccupation with comic opera, to the neglect of oratorio and symphony" was a "deplorable" loss to English music, although he also wrote that without Gilbert, nothing of Sullivan's music would have survived. Cardus championed Delius against the consensus of his fellow-critics: "His music looks back on days intensely lived through; it knows the pathos of mortal things doomed to fade and vanish". At the 1929 Delius Festival in London, Cardus briefly met the composer, who thought he looked too young to be The Manchester Guardian's music critic, and counselled him: "Don't read yourself daft. Trust to y'r emotions". Also against the grain of critical opinion, Cardus commended the then unfashionable music of Richard Strauss and Anton Bruckner.

In 1931 Cardus visited the Salzburg Festival, where he met Beecham and began a friendship which lasted until Sir Thomas's death in 1961—despite numerous disagreements. One of Cardus's notices in 1937 so incensed Beecham that he announced he would not conduct any concert at which Cardus was present. Cardus later numbered Beecham, with Elgar and Delius, as "one of the three most original spirits known in English music since Purcell". The annual Salzburg Festival became a highlight of Cardus's musical calendar; in 1936 he saw Toscanini conduct a performance there of Wagner's Die Meistersinger that, he said, "will remain in the mind for a lifetime ... Toscanini held us like children listening to a tale told in the chimney corner, lighted by the glow of olden times". Cardus's final prewar Salzburg visit was in 1938, just after the German-Austrian Anschluss which led to the withdrawal in protest of many of the Festival's leading figures.

Despite financial incentives from London newspapers, Cardus remained loyal to The Manchester Guardian. On the outbreak of war in September 1939 the Free Trade Hall closed, requisitioned for military purposes. The Hallé Society left Manchester to tour with Sargent around the north-west of England. With no music in Manchester and all first-class cricket suspended, Cardus was unemployed, "imprisoned in Manchester, useless to anybody". Thus, when he received an offer from Sir Keith Murdoch to join The Herald of Melbourne in Australia, he accepted immediately.

== Australia ==
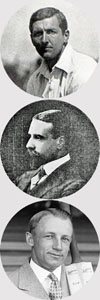
In Australia, Cardus developed friendships with C. B. Fry, Sir Thomas Beecham and Donald Bradman.

Cardus had been known to Australian readers since the 1920s, when The Argus in Melbourne reported his view that Australians made cricket "a war game ... with an intensity of purpose too deadly for a mere game." His books on cricket were widely reviewed in the Australian press in the 1920s and 30s; one critic commented in 1929, "Mr. Cardus mingles fancy with fact. The latter is preferable." Another Australian writer, quoting him extensively in 1932, observed, "Mr. Cardus is a gifted writer and a most impartial critic." By 1936 he was known to a considerable section of the Australian public as a cricket writer, although he was hardly known there in his musical capacity.

The 1936–37 MCC tour of Australia under G.O. Allen was the occasion of Cardus's first visit to the country. During the tour he made, or consolidated, friendships with players and colleagues including C. B. Fry and Donald Bradman. Fry, a former England cricket captain, was a boyhood hero of Cardus, and was covering the Tests for the London Evening Standard. In Bradman, Cardus found a sophistication and sensitivity that other writers had failed to detect. When interviewed on his arrival in Australia, Cardus speculated how he would cope for the six months of the tour without music; he was touched when the following day music students in Perth gave him a private recital of music by Chopin and Hugo Wolf. During this tour Cardus wrote for The Herald in Melbourne, and broadcast about cricket on Australian radio.

Cardus made a private visit to Australia from mid-January to mid-March 1938. (Note: According to the Australian press, Cardus was recuperating from a breakdown in his health. Neither Brookes nor Daniels mentions the trip or Cardus's health before it. O'Brien indicated that The Manchester Guardian confirmed that the visit was to improve Cardus's health.) When he joined The Herald in 1940, his initial brief was to cover a series of concerts conducted by Beecham for the Australian Broadcasting Commission (ABC). Daily contact between the two men during Beecham's time in Australia between June and October 1940 helped to consolidate their friendship. At the end of his tour Beecham tried to persuade Cardus to join him in sailing to America, asking, "Do you propose to stay in this barbarous country all your life?" Cardus insisted on remaining in Australia, but moved from Melbourne to Sydney. Concluding that he could not satisfactorily review concerts for an evening newspaper, he joined the staff of The Sydney Morning Herald (SMH).

At first Cardus failed to adjust his expectations to the prevailing standard of music-making in Australia, which was not at that time comparable to the best on offer in Europe or America. He was accused of being "just one more sneering Pommy bastard come to hand down higher wisdom to the ignorant colonials." (Note: While writing his autobiography, in which he did not conceal his illegitimacy, it amused Cardus to think what his Australian critics would make of it when they read that he genuinely was a Pommy bastard.) His biographer Christopher Brookes suggests that Cardus was applying critical standards "more appropriate to Salzburg than to Sydney". Over the next two years Cardus and the public slowly came to terms with each other, and by 1942 he was both popular and respected among Australians.

Mr Cardus's phrasing and diction are music itself, and his comments so graphic that one lives and moves for the time being in the scenes and situations associated with the music, and the composer becomes a living presence.

— Reader's letter to The Sydney Morning Herald.

For the ABC Cardus presented a weekly hour-long programme, "The Enjoyment of Music", which enlarged the audience for classical music across the country. His topics included concert works, such as the late Beethoven string quartets and Mahler's Ninth Symphony, operas including The Marriage of Figaro and Der Rosenkavalier, and performers such as Wilhelm Furtwängler and Arturo Toscanini. He also gave a weekly, fifteen-minute talk on music, illustrated by records, for the children's Argonauts Club programme and regularly wrote for ABC Weekly.

Cardus rented a small flat in the Kings Cross district of Sydney, where he wrote his Ten Composers (1945) and Autobiography (1947). He said later that he found the discipline of writing for seven hours a day difficult at first, but that the process had turned him from a journalist into something more substantial. After his wife announced her intention of sailing from England in 1941 to join him, Cardus declined to move to a larger flat to accommodate them both, and rented a separate establishment for her a mile away. They dined together once a week, but otherwise continued to lead largely separate lives.

By the end of the war Cardus's thoughts were turning to England. Refusing an offer of a highly paid permanent contract to cover both music and cricket for the SMH he considered his options; with some reluctance he agreed to cover the MCC's 1946–47 tour of Australia for the SMH and also for The Times and The Manchester Guardian. The novelist Charles Morgan wrote of Cardus's reports, "the best [I have] read these 40 years. Who shall dare to say now that George Meredith is forgotten?" (Note: Morgan cited this passage from a Cardus report: "Naturally the English players were now men uplifted; mercury bubbled in the blood ... The issue was here a very ache of intensity; the arms of the deities above were stretching far beyond their reach as Miller went out of his ground to Wright." Cardus's friend the publisher Rupert Hart-Davis considered that such applause "did to some extent go to N.C.'s head, but it's difficult to imagine how one could write about cricket year after year without getting bored with the ordinary and trying to introduce something a little different. He has often sworn he would write of the game no more, but always his love of it draws him back.")

== Later career ==
=== Years of uncertainty ===
In April 1947 Cardus returned to England. He had not as yet decided to leave Australia permanently, but "felt in need of spiritual refreshment". He found a war-weary England in which much had changed; familiar landmarks had disappeared, and old friends and acquaintances had died. The Free Trade Hall was a burnt-out shell, and the Queen's Hall in London completely destroyed; however, Cardus was struck by the apparent good health of the English music scene. He also found an undamaged Lord's, and enjoyed a season of magnificent cricket, marked by the batting exploits of the Middlesex pair, Denis Compton and Bill Edrich. Cardus was back in Sydney by the end of the year, but early in 1948, having accepted an offer from The Sunday Times to cover that year's Test series against Australia, he left for England again.

Another factor that brought Cardus to England in 1948 was the prospect of succeeding Newman, whose retirement as chief music critic of The Sunday Times was assumed to be imminent. However, Newman had no intention of retiring, and made it clear that he would resent any successor-designate looking over his shoulder. Feeling slighted, Cardus resigned from the paper and accepted an offer from the London Evening Standard to be its music critic. This new appointment was short-lived; Cardus's lengthy and discursive concert reviews were incompatible with this paper's style, and were ruthlessly cut by subeditors. At the end of 1948 he was back in Australia, proclaiming his intention to settle there permanently. This determination, too, was brief; the lure of London life proved irresistible. Because of the commercial success of his Autobiography, published in 1947, and the immediate commissioning of a second autobiographical work, Cardus was not under immediate financial pressure. He left Australia again in the spring of 1949, and although he spent the English winter of 1950–51 in Australia, writing about the 1950–51 England v. Australia Test series for the Sydney Morning Herald, London was thereafter his permanent home. Here he worked as a freelance writer, in which role he resumed his association with The Manchester Guardian. In December 1951 he was appointed the paper's London music critic, on a permanent salaried basis.

=== London critic ===
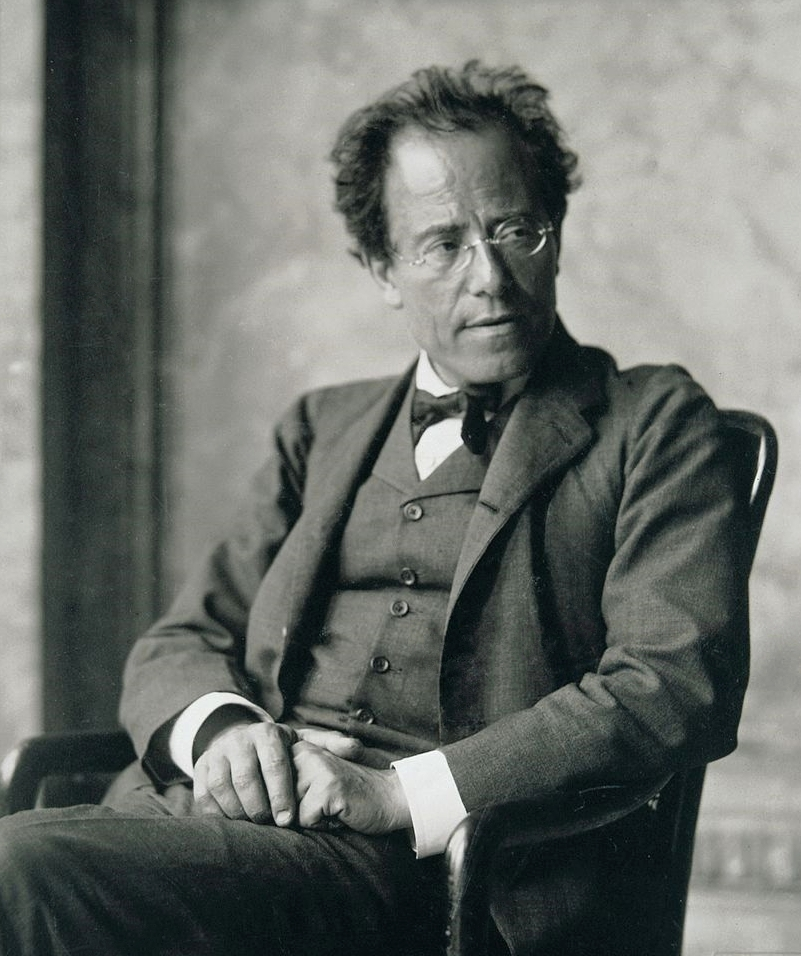
Cardus vigorously promoted the music of Gustav Mahler (pictured) through the 1950s and 1960s

In 1949 Cardus set up his London home at the National Liberal Club, while Edith took a flat in Bickenhall Mansions, just off Baker Street. The pair lived harmoniously apart, though in frequent contact, until Edith's death. Cardus found London's musical life invigorating, with five major orchestras and a host of distinguished conductors and solo artists performing regularly. Toscanini paid his final visit to England in 1952, with two concerts at the Royal Festival Hall. Outside London, Cardus was a regular visitor to the Edinburgh Festival and to Glyndebourne, and was in Manchester for the reopening of the Free Trade Hall and the "homecoming" of the Hallé Orchestra in November 1951. The inaugural concert concluded with Kathleen Ferrier singing "Land of Hope and Glory". Cardus had first heard Ferrier at the Edinburgh Festival in 1947; he became a devoted admirer to the extent that, eventually, questions were raised about his critical blindness to her technical weaknesses. He wrote of her singing that it was, "like the woman herself ... imbued with a quiet but reliant sense and a feeling for the fun and goodness of life". He was devastated by her death from cancer in October 1953; the following year he edited and contributed to a memorial volume of tributes.

For The Manchester Guardian, Cardus wrote around 30 music articles a year. These included "survey" pieces, which often reflected his personal enthusiasms; a regular subject was the music of Gustav Mahler, who in the early 1950s was by no means a popular composer with British audiences. Cardus sought to change that, with a series of articles between 1952 and 1957 under titles such as "Mahler's Growing Influence", "Misunderstanding Mahler", and "The Mahler Problem". He wrote the first volume of a detailed analysis entitled Gustav Mahler: His Mind and his Music; the book, dealing with Mahler's first five symphonies, was published in 1965, but was poorly received by critics. Volume II was never written.

Throughout the 1950s and 1960s Cardus wrote cricket articles; these included an annual reflection for Wisden Cricketers' Almanack and occasional columns for The Manchester Guardian, for whom he covered the 1953 Test Matches against Australia. In the English winter of 1954–55 Cardus made his final visit to Australia, to report on the Test series for The Sydney Morning Herald; he undertook to write "impressions" rather than day-to-day reports on play. He found time to enjoy Sydney's theatrical and music scene, but was disappointed in what he perceived as a decline in the city's musical standards.

(On a performance of Mozart's The Magic Flute): The opera in fact is the only one in existence that might conceivably have been composed by God.

— Cardus's Guardian review, 3 May 1961.

In the decades after the war many of Cardus's earlier heroes and acquaintances died. On Fry's death in 1956 Cardus wrote of him as "A great Englishman, measured by any standards of occupation, art and civilisation". In 1959, still in harness, Newman died at the age of 90; Cardus considered him the most outstanding of all music critics, and thought he should have been appointed a Companion of Honour (CH), or even to the Order of Merit. Beecham died on 8 March 1961. Cardus had for some years noted a decline in his old friend's powers, though he had written in 1954, on the occasion of Beecham's 75th birthday, of the debt the music world owed to the conductor: "He led us out of the Teutonic captivity. He showed us other and more sensitive worlds". After Beecham's death, Cardus organised the publication of a celebratory memoir, as he had done with Kathleen Ferrier. (Note: Unlike the Ferrier memoir, for which Cardus secured contributions from five of her most eminent colleagues, the Beecham memoir was completely Cardus's work, consisting of sections about the man and the musician.) To an extent the departed idols were replaced with new heroes: in music, Herbert von Karajan, Otto Klemperer, Clifford Curzon and Claudio Arrau; in cricket, Keith Miller and Garfield Sobers. Cardus maintained a keen antagonism towards much of contemporary music; discussing Pierre Boulez's Pli selon pli after a performance in 1965, he said he "could not relate the varied succession of aural phenomena to music as my musical intelligence and senses recognise music".

In 1964 Cardus was appointed a Commander of the Order of the British Empire (CBE). In a letter to his friend Marjorie Robinson he described the investiture at Buckingham Palace, remarking that the Queen "might have been any nice shy young lady in D.H. Evans or Kendal Milnes". Just over two years later Cardus was awarded a knighthood, the first music critic to receive such an honour, although in all likelihood it was awarded as much for his cricket writing. (Note: The official citation was "for services to cricket and music".) Years previously Beecham had advised: "In the unlikely event of you being offered a knighthood, Neville, take it. It makes tables at the Savoy so much easier to come by". (Note: While standing in wait at Buckingham Palace for his second investiture Cardus announced to his fellow honorands, "I've been through all this before when I got my CBE. You can't sit down, you can't get a drink and you can't spend a penny. I can't go through it all again. If they offer me a life peerage I shall turn it down.")

=== Final years ===
Edith Cardus died on 26 March 1968. Despite their separate day-to-day lives, she had been an influential presence for nearly all Cardus's adult life; they had communicated by telephone almost daily, and he felt her loss keenly. After her death he left the National Liberal Club and moved into her flat, which remained his base for the rest of his life. In the ensuing months he worried about his deteriorating relationship with The Guardian; the paper had been renamed in 1959 following reorganisation, and its editorial offices had moved to London in 1964. Cardus felt that much of the old ethos had departed, and that his once-sacrosanct copy was now at the mercy of subeditors. He was particularly incensed by the treatment meted out to his 1969 Edinburgh Festival reports, and referred to the subeditors' room as "the Abattoir" in one of many letters complaining of editorial butchery.

As well as his work for The Guardian Cardus wrote occasionally for The Sunday Times, a particular pleasure to him in view of his failure to achieve Newman's post. In 1970 he published Full Score, the last of his autobiographical works and, in Daniels's view, the least substantial of all the Cardus books. In his eighties, Cardus assumed the role of guru to young aspiring writers, before whom he would hold court in favourite locations: the Garrick Club, the National Liberal Club, or Lord's. According to Daniels, Cardus "thrived in the role of patron, encourager, [and] accoucheur". Howat describes his appearance in these years as not having changed much from his younger days: "... the lean, ascetic figure of moderate height, with sharp features, sleek hair, and strong glasses".

Cardus died on 28 February 1975 at the Nuffield Clinic, London, a few days after collapsing at home. His cremation service was private. On 4 April more than 200 people attended a memorial service at St Paul's, Covent Garden. These included representatives from Cardus's worlds of cricket, journalism and music. Flora Robson and Wendy Hiller gave readings, and Clifford Curzon, with the Royal Philharmonic Orchestra, played the second movement of Mozart's Piano Concerto No. 23. The eulogy was given by the cricket writer and historian Alan Gibson, who took as his text verses from Blake's Auguries of Innocence:

Joy and woe are woven fine,
A clothing for the soul divine;
Under every grief and pine
Runs a thread of silken twine.

== Reputation, honours and influence ==
Cardus's contribution to cricket writing has been acknowledged by various commentators on the game. John Arlott wrote: "Before him, cricket was reported ... with him it was for the first time appreciated, felt, and imaginatively described." Howat commented: "He would have his imitators and parodists, and no serious cricket writer would remain unaffected by him". His influence on his successors was more specifically acknowledged by Gibson:

"All cricket writers of the last half century have been influenced by Cardus, whether they admit it or not, whether they have wished to be or not, whether they have tried to copy him or tried to avoid copying him. He was not a model, any more than Macaulay, say, was a model for the aspiring historian. But just as Macaulay changed the course of the writing of history, Cardus changed the course of the writing of cricket. He showed what could be done. He dignified and illuminated the craft".

It was his eager observing of all [the] qualities inherent in music's art and artfulness – and his ability to write about them with such elegance, irony and seriousness – which made Neville Cardus so special

— Daniel Barenboim's tribute to Cardus.

As a music critic, Cardus's romantic, instinctive approach was the opposite of Newman's objective school of musical criticism. Initially in awe of Newman's reputation, Cardus soon discovered his own independent, more subjective voice. A fellow critic wrote that Newman "probed into Music's vitals, put her head under deep X-ray and analysed cell-tissue. Cardus laid his head against her bosom and listened to the beating of her heart." Despite their different approaches, the two writers held each other in considerable regard; at times, Newman's own prose showed the influence of Cardus's style. Among leading musicians who have paid tribute to Cardus, Yehudi Menuhin wrote that he "reminds us that there is an understanding of the heart as well as of the mind ... in Neville Cardus, the artist has an ally". Colin Davis highlighted "the quality and verve of Cardus's writing", which had made him a household name.

Beside his CBE and knighthood, Cardus received numerous honours from the musical and cricketing worlds, at home and overseas. In 1963 he was awarded the City of Bayreuth's Wagner Medal; he was given honorary membership of the Royal Manchester College of Music in 1968, and of the Royal Academy of Music in 1972. The Hallé Orchestra honoured him with two special concerts in April 1966 to mark his long association with the orchestra. In 1970 he received the Austrian Cross of Honour for Science and Art, 1st class. Among the honours he most valued was the presidency, for two years, of Lancashire County Cricket Club, which he accepted in 1971.

Cardus was not an "establishment" figure. His friends encountered initial resistance when they sought his election to the MCC, although he was eventually accepted in 1958. (Note: A letter from an MCC committee member to one of Cardus's supporters explained: "There is some feeling against him as a man, partly I gathered because he said in his autobiography that his aunt (or even his mother) was a harlot".) He was denied the civic honour of the Freedom of the City of Manchester, and although he made light of this omission he was hurt by it. Long after his death, the city named a pathway close to the rebuilt Summer Place "Neville Cardus Walk". Aside from formal institutional recognition, Cardus was highly regarded by prominent individual cricketers and musicians, as indicated by the "tribute book" he received at his 70th birthday celebration lunch. The book included contributions from Wilfred Rhodes, Jack Hobbs and Len Hutton, and also from Klemperer, Elisabeth Schwarzkopf and Bruno Walter. He managed to maintain close friendships with both Beecham and Sir John Barbirolli, though the two conductors cordially disliked one another.

In the conventional sense, Cardus was not a religious man; Dennis Silk, a one-time MCC president, suggests that Cardus's religion was "friendship". In Autobiography Cardus says he found his Kingdom of Heaven in the arts, "the only religion that is real and, once found, omnipresent"—though his rationalism was shaken, he confesses, when he came to understand the late string quartets of Beethoven. He ends his autobiography by declaring: "If I know that my Redeemer liveth it is not on the church's testimony, but because of what Handel affirms".

Within the relaxed framework of his marriage, Cardus enjoyed relationships with many women. These included Hilda "Barbe" Ede, with whom he shared a passionate affair in the 1930s before her sudden death in 1937; Cardus referred to her as "Milady", and devoted a chapter of Full Score to her. After his return from Australia his closest women friends were Margaret Hughes and Else Mayer-Lismann, to whom he referred respectively as his "cricket wife" and his "music wife". Hughes, who was more than 30 years younger than Cardus, became his literary executor after his death, and edited several collections of his cricketing and musical writings.

== Books by Cardus ==
The list includes all original works together with collections, anthologies and books edited or jointly edited by Cardus. Posthumous publications are included. Publication year relates to the original edition; many of the books have been reissued, often by different publishers.

=== Autobiographical works ===
- Autobiography. London: Collins. 1947. OCLC 1106112.
- Second Innings—Autobiographical Reminiscences. London: Collins. 1950. OCLC 558923046.
- My Life (edited by H.G. Earnshaw). London: Collins. 1965. OCLC 5215263. A condensed edition of Autobiography and Second Innings
- Full Score. London: Cassell. 1970. ISBN 030493643X.
- Conversations with Cardus (edited by Robin Daniels). London: Gollancz. 1976. ISBN 0575021268.

=== Music books ===
- Samuel Langford—Musical Criticisms (edited by Neville Cardus). London and Oxford: Oxford University Press. 1929. OCLC 1072313.
- Ten Composers. London: Jonathan Cape. 1944. OCLC 34134895. (Chapters on Schubert, Wagner, Brahms, Mahler, Richard Strauss, César Franck, Debussy, Elgar, Delius and Sibelius)
- Music for Pleasure. Sydney and London: Angus & Robertson. 1942. OCLC 558923034.
- Kathleen Ferrier—A Memoir. London: Hamish Hamilton. 1954. OCLC 468939873. (A memorial volume, edited by Cardus, with additional contributions by Winifred Ferrier, Sir John Barbirolli, Benjamin Britten, Roy Henderson, Gerald Moore and Bruno Walter)
- Talking of Music. London: Collins. 1957. OCLC 252854923.
- A Composers Eleven. London: Jonathan Cape. 1958. OCLC 2986595. (A revised version of Ten Composers, with an additional chapter on Bruckner)
- Sir Thomas Beecham—A Memoir. London: Collins. 1961. OCLC 1290533.
- Gustav Mahler—His Mind and His Music. London: Gollancz. 1965. OCLC 185561901.
- The Delights of Music—A Critic's Choice. London: Gollancz. 1966. OCLC 912315.
- What is Music? (edited by Margaret Hughes). London: White Lion. 1977. ISBN 0728500175.
- Cardus on Music—A Centenary Collection (edited by Donald Wright). London: Hamish Hamilton. 1988. ISBN 0241122856.

=== Cricket books ===
- A Cricketer's Book. London: Grant Richards. 1922. OCLC 20476437.
- Days In the Sun—A Cricketer's Journal. London: Grant Richards. 1924. OCLC 36463332.
- The Summer Game—A Cricketer's Journal. London: Grant Richards. 1929. OCLC 54322964.
- Cricket. London and New York: Longmans Green. 1930. OCLC 986998.
- Good Days—A Book of Cricket. London: Jonathan Cape. 1934. OCLC 8279027.
- Australian Summer. London: Jonathan Cape. 1937. OCLC 36463306.
- English Cricket. London: Collins. 1945. OCLC 2580219.
- Cardus On Cricket—A Selection from the Cricket Writings of Neville Cardus. London: The Sportsman's Book Club. 1949.
- Cricket all the Year. London: Collins. 1952. OCLC 753105120.
- Close of Play. London: Collins. 1956. OCLC 30163488.
- The Playfair Cardus—Essays by Neville Cardus first published in "Playfair Cricket Monthly". London: Dickens Press. 1966. OCLC 59024265.
- The Noblest Game—A Book of Fine Cricket Prints (jointly edited with John Arlott). London: Harrap. 1969. ISBN 024559888X.
- Cardus in the Covers. London: Souvenir. 1978. ISBN 0285623729.
- Play Resumed with Cardus. London: Souvenir. 1979. ISBN 0285624261.
- A Fourth Innings with Cardus. London: Souvenir. 1981. ISBN 0285624830.
- The Roses Matches, 1919–1939. London: Souvenir. 1982. ISBN 0285625209.
- A Cardus for All Seasons (edited by Margaret Hughes). London: Souvenir. 1985. ISBN 0285626868.
- Cardus on the Ashes (edited by Margaret Hughes). London: Souvenir. 1989. ISBN 0285629239.
- The Wisden Papers of Neville Cardus (edited by Benny Green). London: Stanley Paul. 1989. ISBN 0091740010.

=== General anthology ===
- The Essential Neville Cardus (edited by Rupert Hart-Davis). London: Jonathan Cape. 1949. OCLC 12986547.
- The Bedside Guardian 13: A Selection from the Guardian 1963-1964 (foreword/editor). London: Collins. 1964.
- The Bedside Guardian 15: A Selection from the Guardian 1965-1966 (foreword/editor). London: Collins. 1966.

== Sources ==
- Bailey, Philip; Philip Thorn; Peter Wynne-Thomas, eds. (1984). Who's Who of Cricketers. London: Newnes Publishing. ISBN 0600346927.
- Brookes, Christopher (1985). His Own Man: The Life of Neville Cardus. London: Methuen. ISBN 0413509400.
- Cardus, Neville (1944). Ten Composers. London: Jonathan Cape. OCLC 34134895.
- Cardus, Neville (1947). Autobiography. London: Collins. OCLC 1106112.
- Cardus, Neville (1950). Second Innings. London: Collins. OCLC 225543.
- Cardus, Neville, ed. (1954). Kathleen Ferrier: A Memoir. London: Hamish Hamilton. OCLC 785758405.
- Cardus, Neville (1961). Sir Thomas Beecham. London: Collins. OCLC 1290533.
- Cardus, Neville (1970). Full Score. London: Cassell. ISBN 030493643X.
- Daniels, Robin (2009). Cardus, Celebrant of Beauty: a Memoir. Lancaster: Palatine. ISBN 978-1874181583.
- Hart-Davis, Rupert, ed. (1949). The Essential Neville Cardus. London: Jonathan Cape. OCLC 12986547.
- Hart-Davis, Rupert, ed. (1985). Lyttelton/Hart-Davis Letters, Volume 1. London: John Murray. ISBN 0719542464.
- Hart-Davis, Rupert, ed. (1986). Lyttelton/Hart-Davis Letters, Volume 4. London: John Murray. ISBN 0719543185.
- Lucas, John (2008). Thomas Beecham: An Obsession with Music. Woodbridge: Boydell. ISBN 978-1843834021.
- O'Brien, Christopher (2018). Cardus Uncovered. Nottingham: Whitethorn Range Publishing. ISBN 978-1-9999105-0-1.
- Wilton, Iain (1999). C.B. Fry: An English Hero. London: Richard Cohen Books. ISBN 186066170X.
- Ziegler, Philip (2004). Rupert Hart-Davis, Man of Letters. London: Chatto and Windus. ISBN 0701173203.
