= Samuel Langford =

English music critic

Langford in his later years

Samuel Langford (1862 - 8 May 1927) was an influential English music critic of the early twentieth century.

Trained as a pianist, Langford became chief music critic of The Manchester Guardian in 1906, serving in that post until his death. As chief critic, he succeeded Ernest Newman and preceded Neville Cardus.

== Biography ==
=== Early years ===
Langford was born to an old Lancashire family in Withington, near Manchester, where his father was a market gardener. By the age of twenty Langford was an accomplished pianist and church organist, and was sent to study in Leipzig with Carl Reinecke. Recognising that his short hands were unsuited to virtuoso pianism, Langford returned to Manchester, where he was engaged by The Manchester Guardian as deputy to Ernest Newman, whom he succeeded as chief music critic in 1906.

=== Manchester Guardian ===
The rest of Langford's career was spent in this post, based in Manchester, although he sometimes travelled to London to hear a new work in which he was interested, and he never missed the big music festivals. Manchester was, in the early years of the twentieth century, an important musical city, with Hans Richter and the Hallé Orchestra at its centre. Neville Cardus said of him:

Langford reigned supreme in the music of the North of England.... Everybody knew him; Richter himself was not a more familiar and symbolical figure in Manchester.... Langford was a great man and a writer on music without parallel.

The critic C. A. Lejeune wrote of him, "He was a musical perfectionist and great local character. His hobby was the cultivation of delphiniums ... His Lancashire accent was as rich as a fine, fruity Eccles cake. His formal clothes were very dark, and his aggressive beard was very white."

As a trained concert pianist Langford retained a special fondness for the music of Chopin, he particularly enjoyed Lieder by Schubert, Brahms and Wolf, and among his other loves were Mozart and Wagner. The Musical Times quoted with approval the comment of an obituarist:

In everything he did he was original: in his thought, his speech, his writing. … Even good critics of music are apt at times to descend to the trite and conventional phrase, and, wearied by the frequent repetition of familiar works, to indulge in repetition themselves. Langford never did this, and the reason was that he was never bored by listening to good music. The music might be familiar to him, but it was never stale.

Langford's music sympathies were broad. His colleagues observed, "A Gilbert and Sullivan opera, a newcomer making his first appearance … or an open rehearsal by students would set his musical imagination going … and he would clothe his thoughts about them in phrases so apt and spontaneous that sometimes it gave one a thrill to read them." Newman offended some of Langford's admirers by expressing the view that Langford was not really a music critic but rather "an unusually attractive writer whose chief concern happened to be music", but Newman nevertheless considered that at his best Langford "wrote in a way that is without parallel in the criticism of this or any other time".

Like his editor, C. P. Scott, Langford encouraged the young Cardus, who succeeded him as chief music critic. One of Cardus's first acts in his new post was to edit a collection of his predecessor's writings, published in 1929.

Langford married Leslie Doig in 1913. There was one daughter of the marriage, Brenda, born in 1918, later, as Brenda Milner, professor of neuropsychology at the Montreal Neurological Institute. Langford died after a serious illness at the family home in Withington, aged 65.

== Sources ==
- Brookes, Christopher (1985). His Own Man: The Life of Neville Cardus. London: Methuen. ISBN 978-0-413-50940-6.
- Cardus, Neville, ed. (1929). Samuel Langford: Music Criticisms. London: Oxford University Press. OCLC 58839875.
- Cardus, Neville (1984) [1947]. Autobiography. London: Hamish Hamilton. ISBN 978-0-241-11286-1.
- Lejeune, C. A. (1964). Thank You for Having Me. London: Hutchinson. OCLC 868425255.
