= Thomas Attewell =

English cricketer

Personal information
- Full name: Thomas Attewell
- Born: 7 November 1869; Keyworth, Nottinghamshire, England
- Died: 6 July 1937 (aged 67); Nottingham, Nottinghamshire, England
- Batting: Right-handed
- Bowling: Right-arm medium
- Relatives: William Attewell (brother); Walter Attewell (cousin)

Domestic team information
- Years: Team
- 1891–1894: Nottinghamshire

Career statistics
Competition	First-class
Matches	7
Runs scored	53
Batting average	7.57
100s/50s	–/–
Top score	23*
Balls bowled	20
Wickets	–
Bowling average	–
5 wickets in innings	–
10 wickets in match	–
Best bowling	–
Catches/stumpings	2/–
- Source: Cricinfo, 3 October 2010

Thomas Attewell (7 November 1869 – 6 July 1937) was an English first-class cricketer. Attewell was a right-handed batsman who bowled right-arm medium pace. He was born at Keyworth, Nottinghamshire.

Attewell made his first-class debut for Nottinghamshire against the Marylebone Cricket Club in 1891. That same season he made his County Championship debut against Gloucestershire. From 1891 to 1894, he represented the county in 7 first-class matches, the last of which came against Gloucestershire. In his 7 first-class matches, he scored 53 runs at a batting average of 7.57, with a high score of 23*. In the field he took 2 catches.

Later, Attewell also stood as an umpire in first-class and Minor Counties Championship matches, including many major matches at Lords Cricket Ground in London.

He died at Nottingham on 6 July 1937.

== Family ==
His brother William played first-class cricket for Nottinghamshire and the Marylebone Cricket Club, as well as Test cricket for England. His cousin Walter Attewell played first-class cricket for Nottinghamshire. He was married to Mary Attewell (nee Pike) and had three daughters, Sylvia 'Molly' Mary Entwistle (nee Attewell), Rosamund Attewell and Audrey Grace Attewell.
