= Ernest Newman =

English music critic and musicologist

Newman in about 1905

Ernest Newman (30 November 1868 – 7 July 1959) was an English music critic and musicologist. Grove's Dictionary of Music and Musicians describes him as "the most celebrated British music critic in the first half of the 20th century." His style of criticism, aiming at intellectual objectivity in contrast to the more subjective approach of other critics, such as Neville Cardus, was reflected in his books on Richard Wagner, Hugo Wolf, Richard Strauss and others. He was music critic of The Sunday Times from 1920 until his death nearly forty years later. His other positions included chief music critic of The Birmingham Post from 1906 to 1919, as well as brief stints as the chief music critic for The Guardian (1905–1906) and The Observer (1919).

== Biography ==
=== Early years ===
Newman was born William Roberts in Everton, a district of Liverpool, the only child of Seth Roberts, a Welsh tailor, and his second wife Harriet, née Spark, both of whom had children by their first marriages. He was educated at St Saviour's School, Everton, Liverpool College and University College, Liverpool, graduating in 1886, where he studied English literature, philosophy and art. He had no formal musical education but taught himself to play the piano "after a fashion", could read music as easily as books, studied vocal music, composition, harmony and counterpoint, and introduced himself to a wide range of music through reading scores. The young Roberts was intended to pursue a career in the Indian Civil Service, but his health broke down, and he was medically advised not to contemplate residence in India. He became a clerk in the Bank of Liverpool from 1889 to 1903. In his spare time he acquired complete or partial competence in nine foreign languages, wrote for a number of journals on music, literature, religion and philosophical subjects, and published his first two books, Gluck and the Opera, in 1895 and A Study of Wagner, in 1899.

Newman had been brought up as an Anglican, but as an adult he rejected the church. He joined the National Secular Society in 1894, through which he met J. M. Robertson, who became a lifelong friend, influencing his approach to criticism. In 1897, Newman wrote Pseudo-Philosophy at the End of the Nineteenth Century, a critique of imprecise and subjective writing. This displayed, in the words of the Oxford Dictionary of National Biography, "the three most prominent characteristics of his critical thought: scepticism, dialectic skill, and passion for accuracy." He published the book under the pen name Hugh Mortimer Cecil, but all his other works bore the name Ernest Newman, which he adopted to suggest the fresh approach he intended to take toward his subjects: "a new man in earnest". He subsequently used the name in his private life as well as his public life, although he never made the change legal. In 1894 Newman married Kate Eleanor Woollett. His early articles on music were written for the composer Granville Bantock's New Quarterly Musical Review. In 1903 as principal of the Birmingham and Midland Institute school of music Bantock invited Newman to join his staff to teach singing and musical theory.

=== Music critic ===
Newman moved from Birmingham in 1905 to become music critic of The Manchester Guardian, where he was a controversial reviewer, sometimes displeasing the local musical establishment. Newman condemned Hallé Orchestra audiences for their complacency, calling them "ostriches" and "vandals"; castigated conductor Hans Richter for his old-fashioned and unadventurous programming; and criticised the orchestra's poor standard of performance. His trenchancy cost him his job, and he left Manchester the following year, succeeded by Samuel Langford, and moved back to Birmingham as music critic of The Birmingham Post. The Guardian later said of this period in his career, "At Birmingham he was at his best, pungent every morning about the latest singer or fiddler, quick to value a new work, while every week he turned his Monday article into an exciting debating-ground."

During his Birmingham years he wrote studies of Richard Strauss (1908), Edward Elgar (1906), Hugo Wolf (1907) and Richard Wagner (1914). His Hugo Wolf remained the only English study of the composer for more than forty years and achieved the distinction of being translated and published in Germany. The Times said of his 1914 Wagner book, "His enormous admiration for the artist and his contempt for the man were set out in Wagner as Man and Artist, a powerful book exasperating to the devout believers in the cult of Bayreuth."

His first wife died in 1918. In 1919 he married Vera Hands, a former music student at the Midland Institute, and in the same year, finding Birmingham "unmusical, and in a general way uncultured", he moved to London as music critic of the Sunday newspaper The Observer. He had previously resisted any move to London, reluctant to undertake the daily schedule of routine concerts that was then expected of music critics on London daily papers, but The Observer offered him conditions that he found irresistibly congenial.

=== Sunday Times ===
Within a year Newman was induced to move to the rival Sunday Times. As the critic of a Sunday paper, Newman "could pick out the more interesting musical events of the week and discuss them in conjunction and with an air of comparative leisure. His weekly articles soon became a valued feature which all musically minded people had to read." He remained at The Sunday Times from 1920 until his death nearly forty years later, except for a short break when he was guest critic of the New York Evening Post in 1923. He also wrote weekly articles for The Manchester Guardian (1919–24) and Glasgow Herald (1924–28) and contributed to The Musical Times between 1910 and 1955 on subjects as varied as Claude Debussy; Women and Music; Elgar; Johannes Brahms; Beethoven's "Unsterbliche Geliebte"; Bayreuth; Franz Liszt; J. S. Bach; Bantock; Hugo Wolf; Arnold Schoenberg; Russian Opera and Russian Nationalism; Nikolai Medtner; Hector Berlioz; Enrique Granados; and Modest Mussorgsky. From 1930 he made weekly radio broadcasts about music and wrote a sporting column for the Evening Standard.

Newman's largest work was The Life of Richard Wagner, in four volumes, published between 1933 and 1947. In 1959, The Times judged it "likely to remain the standard biography of Wagner in the English language," and Grove's Dictionary of Music and Musicians commented in 2009, "it has still not been surpassed although research has uncovered much that is new." While working on this study, he paused to write a book about Wagner's father-in-law, Franz Liszt (1934), but Newman was sharply critical of Liszt's character, and it has been maintained that the bias of the book "tarnished his critical integrity". Other books published by Newman during his Sunday Times years include the popular collections Opera Nights (1944, an unexpected wartime best-seller), Wagner Nights (1949) and More Opera Nights (1954), published in the US under the title Seventeen Famous Operas (1955).

Troubled by deteriorating eyesight, Newman ceased to write his weekly Sunday Times article after the autumn of 1958. He died the following year at Tadworth, Surrey, age 90. He was survived by his second wife.

== Honours and reputation ==
For most of his life, Newman strongly resisted all official honours, but in his old age he agreed to accept the Order of the White Rose of Finland in 1956 and Germany's Grosse Verdienstkreuz in 1958, as well as an honorary doctorate from the University of Exeter in 1959. In 1955 a tribute described as a Festschrift, Fanfare for Ernest Newman was published to mark his golden jubilee as a critic, with contributions from Neville Cardus, Philip Hope-Wallace, Gerald Abraham, Winton Dean, Christopher Hassall and Sir Jack Westrup, among others.

In 1963, Newman's widow published a memoir of him. Reviewing the book, Jack Westrup wrote, "Her narrative records quite simply her day-to-day life with her husband over a period of forty years.... Here is the picture of a relentless worker, frequently struggling with ill health, obstinate in his determination to make enough to live on, groaning under the self-imposed burden of his life of Wagner.... The only faintly disturbing note is the fact that he did not like children."

Grove's Dictionary of Music and Musicians wrote of Newman:

As a critic, Newman's objective was complete scientific precision in the act of evaluation. Copious reading, a well-ordered system of notebooks, and a forensic style of argument developed from his early training in classical literature and philosophy, carried him far in this aim. Yet what continued to win him admirers was the lively humanity of his writing, which was also reflected in his style of life as much as the well-stocked mind and penetrating judgment.

In an obituary tribute, The Observer said of Newman, "Unlike most scholars, Newman was unsurpassed as a musical journalist. The vigour of his prose and the sense of a large personality that it breathed, his wit and trenchancy as well as his learning made him beyond question the outstanding critic of his time."

== Bibliography ==
=== Original works ===
- 1895 Gluck and the Opera: A Study in Musical History
- 1899 A Study of Wagner
- 1904 Wagner
- 1904 Richard Strauss: With a Personal Note by Alfred Kalisch
- 1905 Musical Studies
- 1906 Elgar
- 1907 Hugo Wolf
- 1908 Richard Strauss
- 1914 Wagner as Man and Artist (revised 1924)
- 1919 A Musical Motley
- 1920 The Piano-Player and Its Music
- 1923 Confessions of a Musical Critic (reprinted in Testament of Music, 1962)
- 1923 Solo Singing
- 1925 A Musical Critic's Holiday
- 1927 The Unconscious Beethoven
- 1928 What to Read on the Evolution of Music
- 1931 Fact and Fiction about Wagner - a critique of The Truth about Wagner (1930) by P. D. Hurne and W. L. Root
- 1934 The Man Liszt: A Study of the Tragi-Comedy of a Soul Divided Against Itself.
- 1933–47 Life of Richard Wagner. 4 vols.
- 1940 Wagner (Novello's Biographies of Great Musicians)
- 1943 Opera Nights
- 1949 Wagner Nights
- 1949 The Wagner Operas
- 1954 More Opera Nights
- 1956–58 From the World of Music (3 vols)
- 1972 (ed. Peter Heyworth): Berlioz, Romantic and Classic: Writings by Ernest Newman

=== Translations ===
- 1906 [N.E. 1925] On Conducting by Felix Weingartner
- 1911 J.S. Bach by Albert Schweitzer
- 1912 ff. Wagner Libretti: The Flying Dutchman, Tannhauser, The Ring, Tristan, The Mastersingers, Parsifal
- 1929 Beethoven the Creator by Romain Rolland

== Archives ==
Letters to Newman from Granville Bantock and Edward Elgar are held at the Cadbury Research Library, University of Birmingham.
