= Walter Attewell =

English cricketer

Personal information
- Full name: Walter Attewell
- Born: 29 January 1865; Keyworth, Nottinghamshire, England
- Died: 3 February 1919 (aged 54); Keyworth, Nottinghamshire, England
- Batting: Right-handed
- Bowling: Unknown
- Relatives: William Attewell (cousin); Thomas Attewell (cousin)

Domestic team information
- Years: Team
- 1891: Nottinghamshire

Career statistics
Competition	First-class
Matches	5
Runs scored	44
Batting average	8.80
100s/50s	–/–
Top score	19
Balls bowled	567
Wickets	9
Bowling average	29.11
5 wickets in innings	1
10 wickets in match	–
Best bowling	5/81
Catches/stumpings	2/–
- Source: Cricinfo, 22 November 2015

Walter Attewell (29 January 1865 – 3 January 1919) was an English cricketer active in first-class cricket in the 1890s, making five appearances for four different teams.

Attewell made his debut in first-class cricket when he was selected to play for Nottinghamshire in the County Championship against Surrey at Trent Bridge in 1891, in what was his one and only appearance at first-class level for Nottinghamshire. He later worked as a traveling cricket coach, and by 1894, he was working in Philadelphia. While in the United States, Attewell played further first-class matches in 1894, making two appearances for the Players of United States of America against the Gentlemen of Philadelphia, one appearance for RH Powell's XI against GS Patterson's XI, and once appearance for AM Wood's XI against GS Patterson's XI. He took one five wicket haul in his brief first-class career, taking 5/81 for the Players of United States of America against the Gentlemen of Philadelphia. From 1906 to 1912, he worked for Shrewsbury School as their cricket coach, where he was assisted by Neville Cardus. (Note: There is confusion as to the identity of the "Attewell" at Shrewsbury. In Autobiography, Cardus names him as William Attewell, a star bowler for Nottinghamshire who played 10 Test matches for England between 1884 and 1892. However, in Who's Who of Cricketers, the Shrewsbury coach is identified as William's cousin Walter Attewell, who played a single match for Nottinghamshire in 1891 and otherwise worked as a travelling cricket coach, for several years in the United States. Robin Daniel's memoir names William, while Christopher Brookes is inexplicit.)

He died at the village of his birth on 3 January 1919. Two of his cousins were also notable cricketers: William Attewell played Test cricket for England, as well as playing for Nottinghamshire, while Thomas Attewell played intermittently for Nottinghamshire in the 1890s.
