= Players of United States of America =

Players of United States of America (also known simply as Players) was an invitational cricket team which took part in several first-class fixtures in the United States in the late 19th century, mostly against Philadelphians (whom they played six times, winning two and drawing three) and touring international teams.

Players who are known to have played for the team include:

- Douglas Adams
- Tom Armitage
- Walter Attewell
- E. Hall
- Alick Handford
- William Harrison
- William Rigley

== See also ==
Category:Players of United States of America cricketers
