= Margaret Hughes (sportswriter) =

English sportswriter (1919–2005)

Margaret Hughes

Margaret Patricia Hughes (1 October 1919 – 30 January 2005) was an English sportswriter.

== Life and career ==
Margaret Hughes was brought up in Kent, one of four children of Dorothy Maude and Arthur Hughes. She worked for the advertising department of The Star, taking the job in order "to see the cricket scores before the general public". During World War II she served as a Wren. She then resumed her newspaper career and became a close friend of the cricket writer Neville Cardus. He bequeathed her his copyrights, and as his literary executor she edited several successful collections of his work.

Her first book, All on a Summer's Day (1953), was described by Cardus in his foreword to the book as "the first book on first-class cricket not written by a man". John Arlott described it as "the book of an enthusiast who has watched and enjoyed cricket with an eye for detail and for character, for adventure and the human reflection behind the ropes".

Following All on a Summer's Day, Hughes covered the Ashes series of 1954–55 for the Sydney Daily Telegraph, the only woman to cover an Ashes series for a daily newspaper until Chloe Saltau did so in 2005 for The Age. Her tour diary was published as The Long Hop (1955). Again Arlott praised her enthusiasm, and noted that "the Australia of her book is not merely a setting for cricket but a place of interest, of fun and of new impressions, all of which share place with the cricket".
