= Alick Handford =

English cricketer

Personal information
- Born: 3 May 1869; Wilford, Nottinghamshire, England
- Died: 15 October 1935 (aged 66); Tavistock, Devon, England
- Batting: Right-handed
- Bowling: Right-arm medium
- Role: Bowler
- Relatives: Sanders Handford (brother)

Domestic team information
- Years: Team
- 1892: Players (USA)
- 1894: Liverpool and District
- 1894–1898: Nottinghamshire
- 1895–1901: MCC
- 1914/15: Southland

Umpiring information
- FC umpired: 6 (1908–1914)

Career statistics
Competition	First-class
Matches	26
Runs scored	275
Batting average	9.48
100s/50s	0/0
Top score	24*
Balls bowled	3,839
Wickets	60
Bowling average	28.70
5 wickets in innings	5
10 wickets in match	0
Best bowling	7/39
Catches/stumpings	16/–
- Source: CricketArchive, 18 January 2015

Alick Handford (3 May 1869 – 15 October 1935) was an English cricketer whose first-class career spanned from 1892 to 1915, and included matches for American, English, and New Zealand teams. He later worked as a cricket coach, and also umpired several first-class matches.

== Career in the United States ==
Born in Wilford, Nottinghamshire, Handford made his first-class debut in Philadelphia, appearing in 1892 for the Players (professional cricketers) in the Gentlemen v Players fixture. He had been preceded in American cricket by his older brother, Sanders Handford (1858–1917), who played four first-class matches for American sides. Alick Handford opened both the batting and the bowling on debut, but the professionals lost the match comprehensively, by an innings and 281 runs. The Players side generally consisted of expatriate Englishmen, often employed as coaches, with the Gentlemen allowing only non-Americans with amateur status, five years' residency, and intended naturalization.

== Career in England ==
Handford had returned to England by 1894, where he appeared twice for Liverpool and District early in the season – in a first-class match against Cambridge University, and then in a two-day fixture against the touring South Africans. He made his County Championship debut for Nottinghamshire, the county of his birth, in July 1894, and played four matches in his debut season. In those four matches, Handford, a right-arm medium pacer, took 25 wickets at an average of 17.44, which included three five-wicket hauls. These were 5/25 on his Nottinghamshire debut against Gloucestershire, 7/75 in the next match, against Middlesex, and 5/53 in his final match of the season, against Somerset.

After his successful debut season, Handford appeared for Nottinghamshire again in the 1895 County Championship. However, he took only 13 wickets from eight matches, six of which came in a single match against Leicestershire (including a five-wicket haul, 5/23). During the 1895 season, Handford also appeared for the Marylebone Cricket Club (MCC) for the first time, having had a position found for him on the MCC groundstaff. He would go on to play matches for the MCC around England, including against many of the non-first-class counties, and also in Wales and Ireland. He was also sent by the MCC to spend a season in East London, South Africa, to assist with the development of the game there. Handford made only three further appearances for Nottinghamshire after the 1895 season, once in 1896 and twice in 1898. Playing for the MCC against Oxford University at Lord's in June 1898, he took 7/39, his best first-class bowling figures. Despite his performance, the MCC lost the match by nine wickets, after twice being bowled out for under 100 runs.

Handford's final first-class match in England came when he was aged 32, for the MCC against Kent in May 1901. He subsequently gained employment as a coach, working in North Wales, at the Repton School in Derbyshire, and again in South Africa, for several schools in Johannesburg. While in South Africa, he helped train the South African team that won its first series against England during the 1905–06 season. Returning to England, he coached at Marlborough College, and also made his first-class umpiring debut during the 1908 season, officiating a match at the County Ground, Derby, between Derbyshire and the touring Philadelphians. His umpiring companion was Henry Shaw, an ex-Derbyshire player.

== Career in New Zealand and later life ==
Initially sent by the MCC to coach at Christ's College, Christchurch, in 1912, Handford remained in New Zealand until 1927. During the 1913–14 season, he umpired five matches for Canterbury (three in the Plunket Shield, and two against the touring Australians). The following season, he played in one last first-class match, after a gap of almost 14 years. Handford, aged 46, captained Southland in its inaugural first-class match, played against Otago at Rugby Park, Invercargill. He was the only player in the Southland side with prior first-class experience, but failed to have any impact as the team lost by 118 runs.

Handford subsequently became a resident of Greymouth, coaching in towns on the West Coast of the South Island. Returning to England, he coached Leicestershire's second XI during the 1930 season, but the following year, in November 1931, he was convicted of fraud for obtaining property by deception. He had stayed at several hotels without paying, and was sentenced to 28 days' imprisonment. Handford died in Tavistock, Devon, in October 1935.
