= William Attewell =

English cricketer

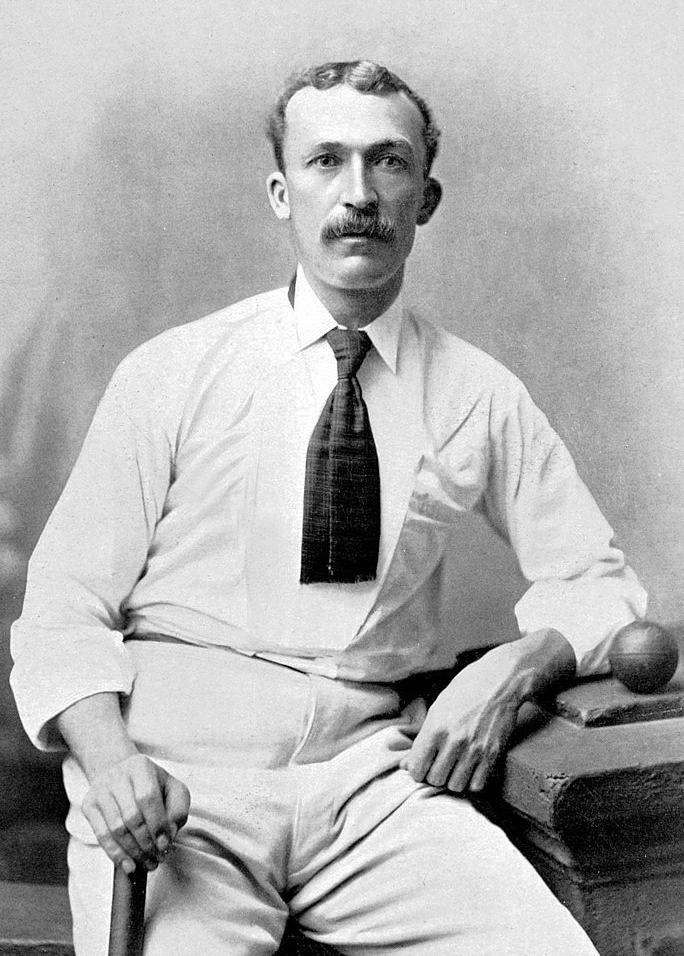
- Attewell in the 1890s

Personal information
- Born: 12 June 1861; Keyworth, Nottinghamshire, England
- Died: 11 June 1927 (aged 65); Long Eaton, Derbyshire, England
- Batting: Right-handed
- Bowling: Right-arm medium

International information
- National side: England
- Test debut (cap 46): 12 December 1884 v Australia
- Last Test: 28 March 1892 v Australia

Career statistics
Competition	Test	First-class
Matches	10	429
Runs scored	150	8,083
Batting average	16.66	14.03
100s/50s	0/0	1/27
Top score	43*	102
Balls bowled	2,850	108,264
Wickets	28	1,951
Bowling average	22.35	15.32
5 wickets in innings	0	134
10 wickets in match	0	27
Best bowling	4/42	9/23
Catches/stumpings	9/–	364/–
- Source: Cricinfo, 10 May 2023

William Attewell (/ˈætwɛl/; commonly known as Dick Attewell; 12 June 1861 – 11 June 1927) was a cricketer who played for Nottinghamshire County Cricket Club and England. Attewell was a medium pace bowler who was renowned for his extraordinary accuracy and economy. On the many sticky or crumbling pitches encountered in his prime Attewell could get on a great deal of spin so as to always beat the bat, whilst his accuracy would make slogging – the only way to make runs under such conditions – very difficult. He was responsible for the development of "off theory" – bowling wide of the off stump to a packed off-side field to frustrate batsmen on the rapidly improving pitches of the 1890s. At times Attewell was a useful batsman for his county, and he scored 102 against Kent in 1897.

Against the fleet-footed Australian batsmen of his time, Attewell was fairly ineffective. Moreover, with bowlers such as Lohmann and J.T. Hearne available who could do all Attewell could, he had trouble maintaining his place at Test level despite all he did for Nottinghamshire and the Marylebone Cricket Club.

Attewell first played for Nottinghamshire in 1881 as a result of a strike by senior players such as Alfred Shaw and Fred Morley. He bowled very well but did not establish himself until 1884 after Morley had died, when he took 100 wickets for less than thirteen runs each. From then on, Attewell was always in the front rank of English bowlers, and after Shaw dropped out of the Nottinghamshire eleven in early 1887 he became the undisputed leader of the county's attack. His first Ashes tour was modest, partly owing to the dry weather, but he continued improving in England – taking 9 for 23 against Sussex at Trent Bridge in 1886 – and toured Australia again in 1887/1888. He proved deadly in a wet La Niña season in minor games, but had no opportunity of showing his deadliness on a sticky wicket at the highest level because Lohmann and Briggs were so effective. However, Attewell's skill and economy, along with the brilliant batting of Shrewsbury, allowed Nottinghamshire to maintain their position as one of the top counties in first-class county cricket right up to the end of 1892.

Even when Attewell became the MCC's chief bowler and increased his aggregate of wickets to around 150 from 1889 to 1892, he did not cement his Test spot, and improving pitches and a severe shortage of support bowling caused Attewell's average to blow out to 21 in 1893 – and his record of 111 wickets at 17.54 in 1894 was disappointing given how much the pitches helped a bowler of his type. Although for the following three years Attewell did remarkably well on all pitches considering Nottinghamshire had no other bowlers even approaching county standard, the great strength of English bowling meant he was not considered for a Test match after 1891. In 1898, Attewell's tireless bowling at last seemed to lose some of its sting, and he failed to reach 100 wickets for the first time in a decade. The extremely dry summer of 1899 showed Attewell's capacity to bowl and bowl all day really was no more: he took only 29 wickets at the extremely high (even on such pitches) cost of 34.62 – in county matches he took just 19 wickets for 38.73 each.

Attewell retired at the end of 1899 (apart from an abortive appearance for MCC in August 1900) and became a first-class umpire. He continued in this role on a regular basis until 1909, and even umpired at Lord's in an emergency in 1911.

He was the first person in Test history to be dismissed for a king pair.

== See also ==
- Pairs in Test and first-class cricket
